= The Real Housewives of New York City season 2 =

Second season of the reality television series The Real Housewives of New York City

The Real Housewives of New York City
- Season 2
- Cover used by iTunes (Left to right) Frankel, de Lesseps, Zarin, Bensimon, Singer, and McCord
- Starring: Bethenny Frankel; LuAnn de Lesseps; Alex McCord; Ramona Singer; Jill Zarin; Kelly Killoren Bensimon
- No. of episodes: 15

Release
- Original network: Bravo
- Original release: February 17 – May 28, 2009

Season chronology
- ← Previous; Season 1 Next → Season 3

The second season of The Real Housewives of New York City, an American reality television series, is broadcast on Bravo. It aired February 17, 2009 until May 28, 2009, and is primarily filmed in New York City, New York. Its executive producers are Andrew Hoegl, Barrie Bernstein, Lisa Shannon, Pam Healy and Andy Cohen.

The Real Housewives of New York City focuses on the lives of Bethenny Frankel, LuAnn de Lesseps, Alex McCord, Ramona Singer, Jill Zarin and Kelly Killoren Bensimon. It consisted of 15 episodes.

== Production and crew ==
The first season was such a success for the network, averaging 1.13 total million viewers during its airing The Real Housewives of New York City was renewed for a second season. In July 2008 filming for season two had begun and in January 2009 the cast, trailer and premier date were announced.

The season premiere "There's a New Girl in Town" was aired on February 17, 2009, while the twelfth episode "Charity Wives" served as the season finale, and was aired on May 5, 2009. It was followed by a two-part reunion that aired on May 12 and May 14, 2009 and a "Lost Footage" episode on May 28, 2009, which marked the conclusion of the season. Andrew Hoegl, Barrie Bernstein, Lisa Shannon, Pam Healy and Andy Cohen are recognized as the series' executive producers; it is produced by Ricochet and is distributed by Shed Media.

== Cast and synopsis ==
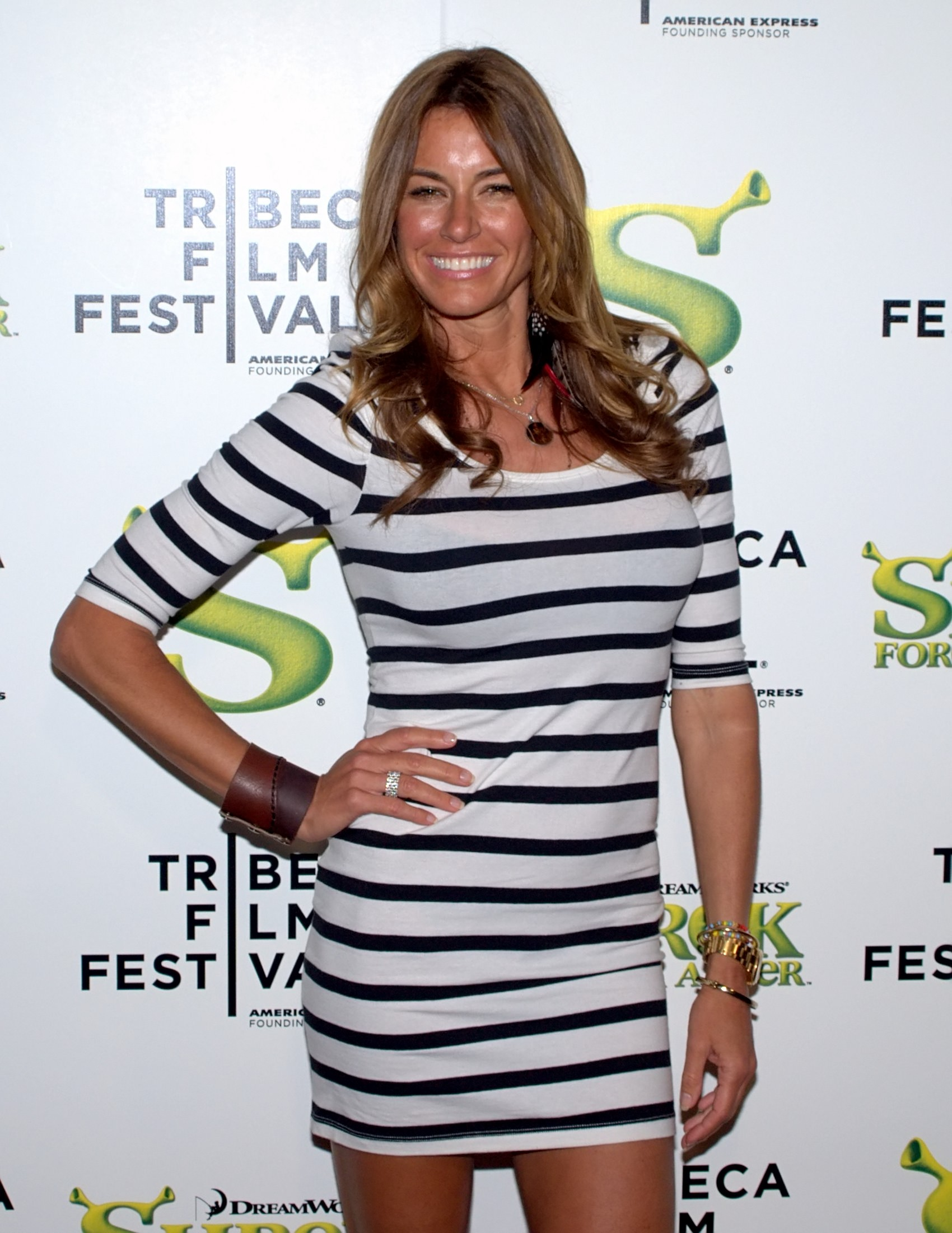
Season two's addition, Kelly Bensimon

All five wives from the first season returned for the second instalment. Season two introduced new wife, Kelly Killoren Bensimon. Bensimon is designer, model, author and fashion editor and is described as a "staple on the Manhattan social scene."

Bensimon covers a party for her work, where she gets treated VIP. Bensimon competes in the Hamptons Classic, a horse show that is a Grand Prix event. Bensimon continues to work as she covers fashion week for her Page Six magazine column and goes shopping with LuAnn de Lesseps to find an outfit for the Malo fashion show. Bethenny Frankel confides in Jill Zarin about her break-up with Jason and bonds with Zarin's mother over the woes. Frankel becomes a cover girl, after shooting a photo shoot for Social Life magazine, but it isn't received well by de Lesseps- which doesn't go unnoticed. Frankel attempts clear the air with de Lesseps but the Countess doesn't take kindly to Frankel's criticism. During fashion week at the Jill Stuart show Frankel is seated next to Bensimon and tension between the two begins. The two meet to sort out their differences but it soon takes a turn for the worse when the claws come out. Frankel focuses on her brand SkinnyGirl when she seeks Alex McCord's assistance in designing a logo. Furthering her brand Frankel heads to Connecticut to promote her line of baked goods, Bethenny Bakes. Le Lesseps is honored by The American Cancer Society where Frankel and Zarin attend in support. De Lesseps begins to get ready to send her daughter off to boarding school which includes telling the other housewives. De Lesseps continues to teach others about class and etiquette which inspires her book Class with the Countess. Ramona Singer's husband sets up a tennis match with Zarin, designed to be a rematch and a disagreement ensues about who Zarin's partner should be. Zarin's plans for a professional partner get turned down. Singer focuses on her business endeavors by developing a skin-care line and working on a demo reel for her jewelry line that will be sold on HSN. Zarin begins the season having drama with and her husband because of interview Zarin gave to the New York Post. Zarin renovates her home with the help of her friends Brad. She later gets involved with the charity Creaky Joints and goes to several meetings. During one of the meeting where some of the other wives attend, Bensimon rubs everyone up the wrong way. McCord and her husband spend time together in their Hamptons rental and St. Barts while their home is renovated. The McCords celebrate the final stages of the renovation by inviting everyone over for a party but old grievances soon arise. Throughout the season, McCord's husband Simon finds himself continuously arguing with Singer. Matters between Simon and Singer worsen when tennis becomes the topic of conversation as well as Zarin being his tennis partner.

== Episodes ==
The Real Housewives of New York City season 2 episodes
No. overall	No. in season	Title	Original release date	U.S. viewers (millions)
10	1	"There's a New Girl in Town"	February 17, 2009	1.64
Jill's interview with the New York Post puts her in hot water. Bethenny spends the summer with Jill at her Hamptons estate, LuAnn introduces Kelly to the other ladies.
11	2	"Hamptons Retreat... But No Surrender"	February 24, 2009	1.86
Bethenny confides in Jill on the state of her relationship with her boyfriend;. Alex and Simon shop in the Hamptons. Jill's parents visit from Florida.
12	3	"On Their High Horses"	March 3, 2009	N/A
LuAnn's housekeeper returns. LuAnn tells the women that her daughter will be going to boarding school in the summer. Jill decides to throw a major event for her charity. Kelly competes in the Hamptons Classic.
13	4	"If You Have Nothing Nice to Say..."	March 10, 2009	N/A
The van Kempens return from the Hamptons. Jill begins a redesign of her home. Bethenny does a photo shoot for Social Life magazine. LuAnn tells Bethenny that she is writing a book on etiquette, and LuAnn also organizes a charity event.
14	5	"New York State of Mind"	March 17, 2009	N/A
LuAnn packs Victoria's things for boarding school. Ramona and Bethenny get together in the Hamptons. Jill visits Alex and Simon. Bethenny decides to clear the air with LuAnn and meets her for lunch.
15	6	"Runway Run-In"	March 24, 2009	N/A
Jill and Bethenny go to lunch at Le Cirque. LuAnn, Kelly, Ramona and the van Kempens attend the Russell Simmons fashion show. Jill has her first charity meeting. Kelly is covering fashion week for her column.
16	7	"Kelly vs. Bethenny"	March 31, 2009	N/A
Ramona invites Kelly to attend the Badgley Mischka fashion show. Bethenny and Kelly meet at a bar downtown. The housewives attend the Page Six Magazine party. Mario approaches Jill about their upcoming tennis match.
17	8	"Game, Set, Feud"	April 7, 2009	1.74
Jill's home redesign is complete. Jill partners with Simon for an upcoming tennis match against Ramona and Mario. Bethenny asks Alex to help her design a logo for her line of "SkinnyGirl Margaritas".
18	9	"Wife in the Fast Lane"	April 14, 2009	N/A
Ramona throws a party to show off her skin care line. LuAnn meets with her writer. Kelly takes a trip to Los Angeles to meet with a designer about her jewelry line. Simon plans something special for Alex's birthday.
19	10	"Unfashionably Late"	April 21, 2009	N/A
Kelly goes to a photo shoot to update her head shot. LuAnn's daughter comes home from boarding school. Ramona makes a demo reel for her jewelry line. Jill discusses the American economy in a radio interview.
20	11	"Van Kempens House Party"	April 28, 2009	N/A
Alex and Simon plan a party to show off their newly renovated home. Bethenny is set up on a blind date. LuAnn and her husband get the opportunity to ring the NASDAQ bell.
21	12	"Charity Wives"	May 5, 2009	2.03
The women take care of final details for Jill's charity event. LuAnn helps Bethenny prepare for a fashion show. Jill and Ramona attempt to work out their differences.
22	13	"Reunion — Part 1"	May 12, 2009	2.29
The reunion begins and the ladies sit down and discuss the events that occurred during the season.
23	14	"Reunion — Part 2"	May 14, 2009	1.53
The reunion concludes as the ladies continue to discuss the season's events.
24	15	"The Lost Footage"	May 28, 2009	N/A
The vault is open as unseen footage from the season is aired.
