= The Real Housewives of New York City season 1 =

First season of the reality television series The Real Housewives of New York City

The Real Housewives of New York City
- Season 1
- Cover used by iTunes (Left to right) Singer, Zarin, de Lesseps, Frankel, and McCord
- Starring: Bethenny Frankel; LuAnn de Lesseps; Alex McCord; Ramona Singer; Jill Zarin
- No. of episodes: 9

Release
- Original network: Bravo
- Original release: March 4 – May 27, 2008

Season chronology
- Next → Season 2

The first season of The Real Housewives of New York City, an American reality television series, is broadcast on Bravo. It aired March 4, 2008 until May 27, 2008, and is primarily filmed in New York City, New York. Its executive producers are Andrew Hoegl, Barrie Bernstein, Lisa Shannon, Pam Healy and Andy Cohen.

The Real Housewives of New York City focuses on the lives of Bethenny Frankel, LuAnn de Lesseps, Alex McCord, Ramona Singer and Jill Zarin. It consisted of 9 episodes.

== Production and crew ==
The Real Housewives of New York City’s production of the series began in November 2007. In January, 2008 it was revealed that Manhattan Moms has been re-titled to The Real Housewives of New York City as well as its premiere date. The following week the full cast of the first season had been announced with Frances Berwick, the Executive Vice President to Bravo saying, "This series will explore the personal and professional lives of five ambitious women who in the upper crust of New York." The series premiered with 0.82 total million viewers, which at the time was deemed impressive. During the course of its first season The Real Housewives of New York City averaged 1.13 total million viewers

The season premiere "Meet the Wives" was aired on March 4, 2008, while the seventh episode "Second Chances" served as the season finale, and was aired on April 15, 2008. It was followed by a reunion episode that aired on April 22, 2008 and a "Lost Footage" episode on May 27, 2008, which marked the conclusion of the season. Andrew Hoegl, Barrie Bernstein, Lisa Shannon, Pam Healy and Andy Cohen are recognized as the series' executive producers; it is produced by Ricochet and is distributed by Shed Media.

== Cast and synopsis ==
Five housewives were featured during the first season of The Real Housewives of New York City, which were describe as "elite and powerful set of New York socialites as they juggle their careers and home lives with busy calendars packed with charity fund-raising galas, the social whirl of the Hamptons, and interviews for elite private schools," as well as "driven and ambitious women show everyone what it takes to make it in the upper echelon of society, where money and status are an essential way of life."

Ramona Singer gets ready for a trip to the Hamptons, causing her daughter Avery to question her fashion choices. After a fashion show Singer catches her husband Mario flirting with a woman, also noticing he isn't wearing his wedding ring. Singer encourages her daughter's endeavors in to acting by taking her to an agency and later takes her to an audition where Singer takes control. LuAnn de Lesseps move her and her family in to their Hamptons home for the summer and de Lesseps bonds with Zarin over their teenage daughters. De Lesseps teaches Bethenny Frankel about class and etiquette. Frankel continues to work on her career and aspires to become the next Martha Stewart. Frankel wants to settle down with her current boyfriend Jason and have a family however she's concerned that he isn't ready to as he already has three children. Jill Zarin supports her daughter's decision to improve her health by going to a detox clinic at Martha's Vineyard. At the end of the summer, Zarin and Singer duke it out during a tennis match, however the sportsmanship is less than friendly. Tensions worsen between the two at a fashion show where Singer is seated front row and Zarin isn't. Alex McCord and her husband go against the grain and head to St. Barts for the summer, after deeming vacationing in the Hamptons as "too much work." McCord attends her son's school evaluation alone, due to her husband heading back to Australia after finding out his stepfather has died.

== Episodes ==
The Real Housewives of New York City season 1 episodes
| No. overall | No. in season | Title | Original release date | U.S. viewers (millions) |
|---|---|---|---|---|
| 1 | 1 | "Meet the Wives" | March 4, 2008 | 0.82 |
Ramona prepares for a trip to the Hamptons with her daughter Avery. Jill's daughter Allyson wants to go to Martha's Vineyard. LuAnn moves her family into their summer home. Bethenny concentrates on her career. Alex and Simon head to St. Barts.
| 2 | 2 | "The Hamptons" | March 11, 2008 | N/A |
Jill and Allyson go to the detox center. Mario and Avery help Ramona choose an appropriate outfit for a fashion show. LuAnn's daughter competes in the Hamptons Classic. Bethenny meets with fashion designer Ginny Hilfiger.
| 3 | 3 | "Fashion Week" | March 18, 2008 | N/A |
Jill takes Allyson shopping for back-to-school clothes. LuAnn and Jill take their daughters to a Seventeen magazine party. Ramona sees Jill at a fashion show. Avery has an interest in acting. Alex and Simon prepare Francois for pre-kindergarten.
| 4 | 4 | "Social Wife" | March 25, 2008 | 1.14 |
Jill, Bethenny, Alex and LuAnn go to a swanky restaurant. Ramona has a night out on the town with her girlfriends. Jill and Bobby offer to help get Alex and Simon's son into a private school. Avery auditions for a Meryl Streep film.
| 5 | 5 | "Careful, She Bites" | April 1, 2008 | N/A |
Bethenny meets Alex to teach her healthy cooking techniques. The van Kempens prepare for a big night out. Ramona gets Avery and her friends ready for a school dance.
| 6 | 6 | "Girl's Night Out" | April 8, 2008 | N/A |
LuAnn has Bethenny over to her house for drinks. Alex and Simon get made up for opening night at the opera.
| 7 | 7 | "Second Chances" | April 15, 2008 | 1.43 |
The De Lesseps take a family trip to the Statue of Liberty. Bobby takes Jill for a romantic dinner and surprises her with a gift.
| 8 | 8 | "Reunion" | April 22, 2008 | N/A |
The ladies of New York City reunite with host Andy Cohen.
| 9 | 9 | "The Lost Footage" | May 27, 2008 | 1.06 |
This episode features previously unaired footage of fights, funny moments and additional insights into the women's home lives.

== DVD releases ==
The first season was released on DVD by Bravo Media on January 1, 2009. The box set is composed of three discs. The first season was also part of The Real Housewives of New York - Complete Series a 47 disc box set that included season 1 - 9 and that was released on November 17, 2017. The show has never been released on Blu-ray.
