= The Real Housewives of New York City season 3 =

Third season of the reality television series The Real Housewives of New York City

The Real Housewives of New York City
- Season 3
- Cover used by iTunes (Left to right) Zarin, Singer, Bensimon, de Lesseps, McCord, and Frankel (Not pictured) Morgan
- Starring: Bethenny Frankel; LuAnn de Lesseps; Alex McCord; Ramona Singer; Jill Zarin; Kelly Killoren Bensimon; Sonja Morgan
- No. of episodes: 18

Release
- Original network: Bravo
- Original release: March 4 – June 24, 2010

Season chronology
- ← Previous; Season 2 Next → Season 4

The third season of The Real Housewives of New York City, an American reality television series, is broadcast on Bravo. It aired March 4, 2010 until June 24, 2010, and is primarily filmed in New York City, New York. Its executive producers are Andrew Hoegl, Barrie Bernstein, Lisa Shannon, Pam Healy and Andy Cohen.

The Real Housewives of New York City focuses on the lives of Bethenny Frankel, LuAnn de Lesseps, Alex McCord, Ramona Singer, Jill Zarin, Kelly Killoren Bensimon and Sonja Morgan. It consists of 18 episodes.

This season marked the first departure of original housewife Bethenny Frankel. She eventually returned for the show's seventh season.

== Production and crew ==
The Real Housewives of New York was a continued success for the network with season two averaging 1.88 million total viewers as well as being Bravo's most visited web page in 2009 with over 46 million total page views. In July 2009, the series was renewed for a third season with production beginning November later that year. The premiere date for season three of The Real Housewives of New York City was revealed in January 2010 and the cast the following month.

The season premiere "New Alliances" was aired on March 4, 2010, while the fourteenth episode "Rebuked, Reunited, Renewed" served as the season finale, and was aired on June 3, 2010. It was followed by a three-part reunion that aired on June 10, June 14 and June 14, 2010 and a "Lost Footage" episode on June 24, 2010, which marked the conclusion of the season. Andrew Hoegl, Barrie Bernstein, Lisa Shannon, Pam Healy and Andy Cohen are recognized as the series' executive producers; it is produced by Ricochet and is distributed by Shed Media.

After the airing of the first part of the reunion on June 10, 2010, The first spin-off to The Real Housewives of New York City season three, titled Bethenny Getting Married?, premiered on Bravo, starring Frankel, Jason Hoppy and Julie Plake. The series documented Frankel as she prepares her life for two of life's biggest milestones: a wedding and a baby, simultaneously. Frankel prepares for motherhood and marries Hoppy, while maintaining her career as an author and natural foods chef with the help of her assistant, Plake. The series premiere was marked as the highest viewing figure in the network's history but was later surpassed by Married to Medicine in March 2013. Upon the series renewal, it was re-titled to Bethenny Ever After.

== Cast and synopsis ==
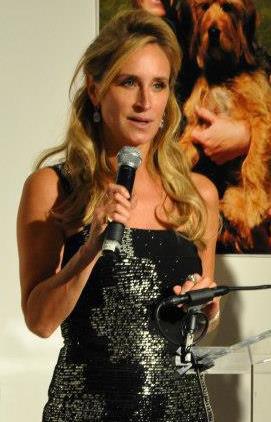
Season three's addition, Sonja Morgan

All six wives from the second season returned for the third installment. Season three introduced Sonja Morgan as a full-time cast member in the seventh episode "New Girl, Old Money" that aired on April 5, 2010. Morgan is a former model and friend to European royalty and is described as an "optimistic, free-spirited partygirl" Morgan revealed she has been asked to join the series prior to season three, but turned down the offer due to being recently divorced.

Also being introduced during this season are recurring cast members, described as "friends of the housewives." Jennifer Gilbert is the first ever recurring cast member in The Real Housewives franchise. Gilbert is an entrepreneur and the creative force behind her New York City event-planning company Save The Date. and is described as a survivor after surviving a vicious stabbing, being stabbed 37 times. Gilbert entered the series after being commissioned by Jill Zarin to help her with her party.

Zarin begins the season with a shift in her friendships, as she bonds with Ramona Singer but she hasn't spoken to Bethenny in months. Zarin takes comfort in bonding with Singer, LuAnn de Lesseps and Kelly Bensimon about their issues with Frankel. Zarin and Frankel come face to face after the downfall of their friendship at the Jill Stuart fashion show. The newfound feud between the two worsens when Frankel reads an article about the two's friendship and she thinks Zarin is responsible. Frankel attempts to reach out to Zarin via a phone call and surprises her with a face-to-face meeting, set up by Signer. Zarin is left feeling she is better off without Frankel. Away from her drama with Frankel, Zarin works on an upcoming book she and her sister have been working on titled Secrets of a Jewish Mother. Frankel returns to Manhattan after spending the summer falling in love with Jason Hoppy. Their relationship continues to move forward when Frankel learns that she is pregnant and the two get engaged. Frankel's pregnancy is leaked on Perez Hilton's gossip site, which leaves Zarin calling people to find out more information. After Zarin calls her, Frankel tells Alex McCord to let Zarin know she is done with her. Frankel poses nude for PETA. Frankel and Singer get into a vicious, below-the-belt argument on the Brooklyn Bridge. Singer finds herself in between her husband Mario and de Lessep's drama after a comment he makes. Singer decides to renew vows with Mario, and asks her daughter Avery to be the maid of honor. Singer renews her vows to Mario at the Pierre Hotel, with all the wives in attendance. De Lesseps makes a snide comment to Frankel at the Mercedes Benz New York Fashion Week which causes Frankel to go into verbal attack mode. De Lesseps finalizes her divorce from the Count and she has a new man in her life. De Lesseps enters the studio to work on recording "Money Can't Buy You Class, which she later performs for the housewives at her release party. McCord is offended when Zarin and de Lesseps make a comment about her children. McCord organizes Brooklyn fashion weekend and she, Bensimon and Singer walk the catwalk. McCord confronts Zarin with all guns blazing, and her boldness leaves everyone shocked. De Lesseps, Singer and Zarin's husband, Bobby, all encourage McCord to apologize. Bensimon decides to pose for Playboy, which isn't received well by her daughters. At the interview for the spread, Bensimon thinks she has found a potential new suitor, the journalist Mike Guy. Bensimon calls a truce between herself and Frankel but on a trip away from the city to the Virgin Islands, Bensimon gets a bit obsessed about revisiting the past. Bensimon gets into several arguments with Frankel during the trip, including calling Bethenny a "hoebag," which leave some of the ladies questioning Bensimon's mental stability. Bensimon reaches out to Zarin in a phone call, which provokes Zarin to come to the island. By the time Zarin arrives on the island, Bensimon has already left and the ladies aren't too happy with Zarin's uninvited entrance. Morgan enters the scene offering to host de Lessep's charity event at her Upper East Side townhouse. Morgan looks into plastic surgery and after she consults her surgeon she then consults her psychic.

== Episodes ==
The Real Housewives of New York City season 3 episodes
No. overall	No. in season	Title	Original release date	U.S. viewers (millions)
25	1	"New Alliances"	March 4, 2010	2.04
Ramona, Jill, LuAnn and Alex enjoy a day on a yacht. Bethenny poses for a nude photo.
26	2	"Dueling Labor Day Parties"	March 11, 2010	1.98
LuAnn gets a surprise visit from Rosie. Ramona chastises Mario. Jason asks Bethenny to move in with him.
27	3	"Fall in Manhattan"	March 18, 2010	1.75
Kelly tells her daughters about the Playboy shoot. LuAnn hosts an event. LuAnn and Jill prod Alex for information.
28	4	"Fashion and Fighting"	March 25, 2010	1.74
LuAnn and Bethenny have a confrontation. Ramona takes her daughter to a fashion show.
29	5	"Hot Off the Press"	April 1, 2010	1.53
Bethenny discovers a gossip article about her relationship with Jill. Kelly meets a potential new suitor.
30	6	"The Ambush"	April 8, 2010	1.85
Bethenny and Ramona argue. LuAnn plans a charity event. Kelly photographs random people.
31	7	"New Girl, Old Money"	April 15, 2010	N/A
Bethenny confides in Alex. Jill believes she is better off without Bethenny. Ramona prepares a surprise for Mario. Luann introduces the ladies to Sonja Morgan, who reignites her friendship with Ramona.
32	8	"Let's See That Ring"	April 22, 2010	1.74
Ramona chooses a maid of honor. Bethenny announces her engagement. Jill reacts to the news.
33	9	"Stay on Message"	April 29, 2010	N/A
Information about Bethenny's pregnancy is leaked. Sonja visits a psychic. Alex delivers a message to Jill.
34	10	"Leap Before You Look"	May 6, 2010	2.25
Tension runs high at LuAnn's charity event. Jill tells Kelly she could be friends with Bethenny again.
35	11	"Housewives Overboard"	May 13, 2010	2.08
The women enjoy Ramona's renewal getaway. Bethenny takes comfort from her girlfriends. LuAnn works on a new song.
36	12	"Sun, Sand and Psychosis"	May 20, 2010	2.32
A breakfast is interrupted by an argument between Kelly and Bethenny. Bethenny decides to cook dinner for everyone.
37	13	"Shunburn"	May 27, 2010	2.56
The ladies are not surprised to find Kelly gone. Unannounced guests show up; LuAnn hears different sides of the story.
38	14	"Rebuked, Reunited, Renewed"	June 3, 2010	2.64
Jill and Bethenny meet for lunch. LuAnn is ready to release her new single. Everyone gathers for Ramona's big day.
39	15	"Reunion — Part 1"	June 10, 2010	2.24
The reunion begins and the ladies sit down and discuss the events that occurred during the season.
40	16	"Reunion — Part 2"	June 14, 2010	2.05
The reunion continues and the ladies continue to discuss the season's prior events and issues.
41	17	"Reunion — Part 3"	June 17, 2010	2.06
The reunion concludes as the ladies continue to discuss the season's events.
42	18	"The Lost Footage"	June 24, 2010	1.44
The vault is open as unseen footage from the season is aired.
