= The Real Housewives of New York City =

American reality television series

- Genre: Reality television
- Starring: Bethenny Frankel; Luann de Lesseps; Alex McCord; Ramona Singer; Jill Zarin; Kelly Killoren Bensimon; Sonja Morgan; Cindy Barshop; Aviva Drescher; Carole Radziwill; Heather Thomson; Kristen Taekman; Dorinda Medley; Jules Wainstein; Tinsley Mortimer; Leah McSweeney; Eboni K. Williams; Sai De Silva; Ubah Hassan; Erin Lichy; Jenna Lyons; Jessel Taank; Brynn Whitfield; Racquel Chevremont; Hailey Glassman; Erika Hammond; Daisy Toye
- Country of origin: United States
- Original language: English
- No. of seasons: 16
- No. of episodes: 302 (list of episodes)

Production
- Executive producers: Andy Cohen; Megan Estrada; Pam Healey; Lisa Shannon; Lauren Volonakis; Barrie Bernstein; Anne Swan; Rajah Ahmed; Kate Murphy; Alfonso Rosales; Kimmy Cucci
- Camera setup: Multiple
- Running time: 41–43 minutes (approx.)
- Production companies: Ricochet (seasons 1–2); Shed Media (season 3–present)

Original release
- Network: Bravo
- Release: March 4, 2008 – present

Related
- Bethenny Ever After; Bethenny & Fredrik; Luann & Sonja: Welcome to Crappie Lake; The Golden Life

The Real Housewives of New York City, abbreviated RHONY, is an American reality television series that premiered on Bravo on March 4, 2008. It has aired fifteen seasons and focuses on the personal and professional lives of several women residing in New York City.

The cast of the first season starred Bethenny Frankel, Luann de Lesseps, Alex McCord, Ramona Singer, and Jill Zarin. Other housewives that starred in multiple of the first thirteen seasons include Kelly Killoren Bensimon, Sonja Morgan, Cindy Barshop, Heather Thomson, Kristen Taekman, Jules Wainstein, Dorinda Medley and Tinsley Mortimer. The series was rebooted in its fourteenth season, making it the first series in the franchise to be completely recast, and starred Sai De Silva, Ubah Hassan, Erin Lichy, Jenna Lyons, Jessel Taank, and Brynn Whitfield; Racquel Chevremont joined during the fifteenth season. The cast of the sixteenth season stars Carole Radziwill, De Silva, Lichy, Taank, Hailey Glassman, Erika Hammond, and Daisy Toye.

Developed as the second installment of The Real Housewives franchise, the success of the series has resulted in four spin-offs: Bethenny Ever After, Bethenny & Fredrik, Luann & Sonja: Welcome to Crappie Lake, and The Golden Life.

== Overview ==
=== Seasons 1–13: Original series ===
While in pre-production, the show was initially titled Manhattan Moms. It was later rebranded to become the second installment of the then-new Real Housewives franchise. The first season premiered on March 4, 2008, and starred Bethenny Frankel, Luann de Lesseps, Alex McCord, Ramona Singer and Jill Zarin. Cast members were paid for their appearances on the series. Bethenny Frankel, for example, was paid $7,250 for the season. Kelly Killoren Bensimon was added to the cast for the second season, which premiered on February 17, 2009. The third season premiered March 4, 2010 and saw the addition of Sonja Morgan as a main cast member, along with Jennifer Gilbert in a recurring capacity. In August 2010, Frankel left the show in order to expand her Skinnygirl product line. Cindy Barshop replaced Frankel for the show's fourth season, which premiered on April 7, 2011. After the fourth season, McCord, Zarin, Killoren Bensimon and Barshop were effectively let go from the show.

In April 2012, Bravo announced a revamp to the cast for its fifth season, integrating Aviva Drescher, Carole Radziwill, and Heather Thomson into the main cast. The season premiered on June 4, 2012. Production for the sixth season was set to begin on May 8, 2013, but the cast instead chose to go into salary negotiations with Bravo, effectively delaying shooting. Drescher, Morgan, Radziwill, Singer, and Thomson renewed their contract in May 2013, while de Lesseps was demoted to a recurring role. The sixth season premiered on March 11, 2014, a year later than planned with Kristen Taekman as the latest housewife. Drescher was dismissed after the sixth season.

The seventh season premiered on April 7, 2015, featuring the return of Frankel and addition of Dorinda Medley, while de Lesseps returned in a full-time role. Taekman and Thomson exited the series after the season ended. For the eighth season, which premiered on April 6, 2016, Jules Wainstein was added to the cast, while Thomson returned in a guest appearance, Taekman did not return. Wainstein left the show in September 2016 for personal reasons. The ninth season premiered on April 5, 2017. Tinsley Mortimer joined the cast, while former housewives Thomson and Zarin appeared as guests. The tenth season premiered on April 4, 2018, with the cast of the ninth season returning. Drescher, Killoren Bensimon, Thomson and Zarin all appeared as guests. It served as Radziwill's final appearance on the show.

The eleventh season premiered on March 6, 2019. Barbara Kavovit joined as a friend of the housewives, and Zarin appeared as a guest. Frankel departed the series after the season for a second time. The twelfth season featured Leah McSweeney joining the cast, which premiered on April 2, 2020. Zarin and Thomson appeared as guests in the twelfth season. Mortimer and Medley announced their departure from the series in June 2020 and August 2020 respectively. Mortimer coincided her announcement with her relocation to Chicago, to pursue her romantic relationship with Scott Kluth, while Medley later stated she was fired from the show. The thirteenth season premiered on May 4, 2021, with Eboni K. Williams joining the series, in addition to Heather Thomson and Bershan Shaw appearing as friends of the housewives. In September 2021, it was confirmed by Bravo that the thirteenth season reunion was officially cancelled.

=== Seasons 14–present: Rebooted series ===
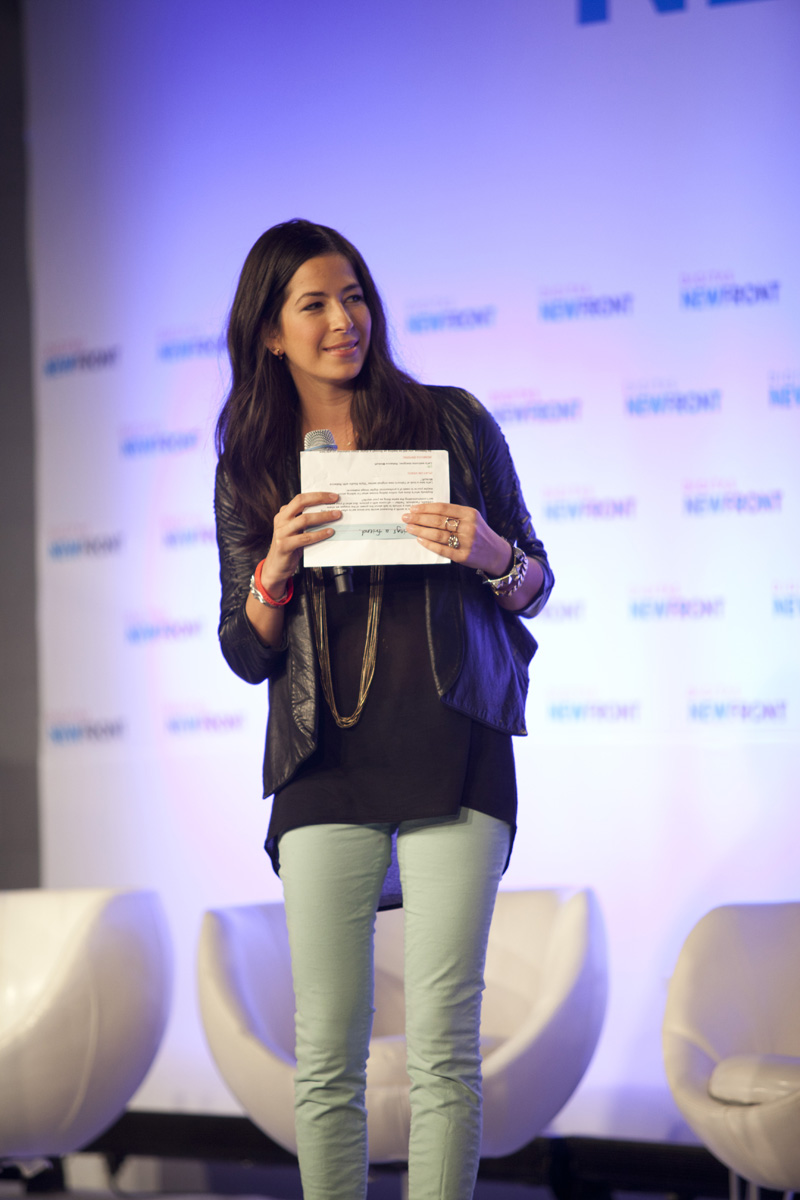
Season 15 addition, Rebecca Minkoff

On March 23, 2022, it was announced that following the thirteenth season's negative reception, the showrunners had made the decision to "most likely" recast the show from scratch for the fourteenth season, and create a second version of the show following some of the show's original housewives, referred to as RHONY: Legacy or RHONY: Throwback. Although the series has partially shifted its cast before, this marked the first time that the network had decided to completely replace the cast. As a result, the series’s fourteenth season was billed as a series reboot, with little to no connections to the original cast of the series. It was later announced that de Lesseps and Morgan would star in their own spin-off series titled Luann & Sonja: Welcome to Crappie Lake. Filming for the spin-off began in July 2022 in the small town of Benton, Illinois. The series premiered on July 9, 2023. The fifth season of The Real Housewives Ultimate Girls Trip, a spin-off featuring various women from The Real Housewives franchise, being billed as RHONY Legacy premiered in December 2023 on Peacock. Taking place in Saint Barthélemy in the same villa that was featured in the fifth season, the cast includes Killoren Bensimon, de Lesseps, Medley, Morgan, Singer and Taekman.

Sai De Silva, Ubah Hassan, Erin Lichy, Jenna Lyons, Lizzy Savetsky, Jessel Taank and Brynn Whitfield were announced as the cast of the rebooted fourteenth season on October 16, 2022. Savetsky exited the series midway into filming the season on November 16, alleging that she had received anti-Semitic hate across her social media accounts. The fourteenth season premiered on July 16, 2023. In March 2024, Bravo announced that the show was renewed for a fifteenth season, with all six housewives from the fourteenth season returning. In April 2024, it was announced that Rebecca Minkoff would be joining the series in a friend of capacity. In June 2024, it was announced that Racquel Chevremont would also be joining the fifteenth season of the series as a full-time housewife. The fifteenth season premiered on October 1, 2024. In February 2025, ahead of the conclusion of the fifteenth season reunion, it was announced Minkoff would be exiting the series after one season.

In May 2025, a spokesperson for Bravo told Us Weekly speculated reports of the franchise's cancelation were untrue. This was in response to a report published by Page Six suggesting the franchise had been canceled by the network, with "hopes" to revive it in the future; in response to the Page Six article, Frankel made claim on her TikTok that the franchise had indeed been canceled. De Silva responded to the cancelation as "fake news" on her social media pages, while Cohen supported claims that "nothing has happened" with the franchise. Cohen further addressed the report on his SiriusXM radio show, stating, "We are between seasons", revealing producers had met with ten potential new housewives to join the franchise. The following month, Whitfield announced her departure, citing her decision to step away from reality television. Summer House co-stars Paige DeSorbo and Lindsay Hubbard, as well as makeup artist Daisy Toye were named as potential new housewives. During BravoCon in November 2025, Cohen revealed information regarding the sixteenth season and its cast would be announced "soon". That same month, Lyons announced her exit; she disclosed that despite being invited back in a "friend of" capacity, due to her unwillingness to film her personal life, and ultimately decided to depart.

On March 2, 2026, Bravo revealed the cast for the sixteenth season. Returning from the previous season included De Silva Lichy, and Taank. Hailey Glassman, Erika Hammond, and Toye were introduced as new, full-time housewives. Radziwill's return in a "friend of" role was also announced. Production was reported to begin the week of March 2. That May, it was reported Devyn Simone had joined the cast as a friend. The season premiered on September 8, 2026. Radziwill, initially announced as a "friend of", was promoted to a series regular and featured cameo appearances by Martha Stewart.

== Cast ==
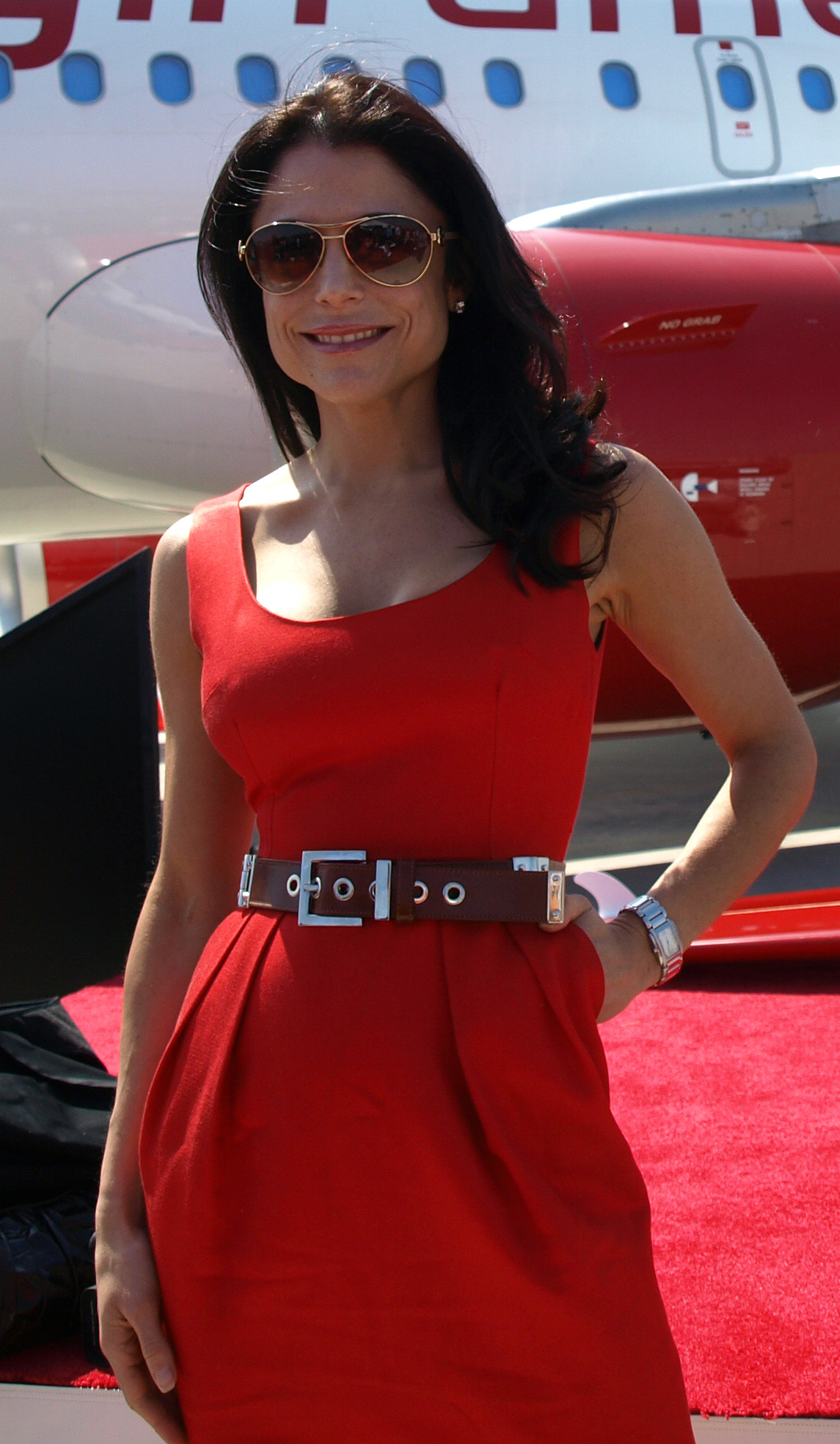
Bethenny Frankel

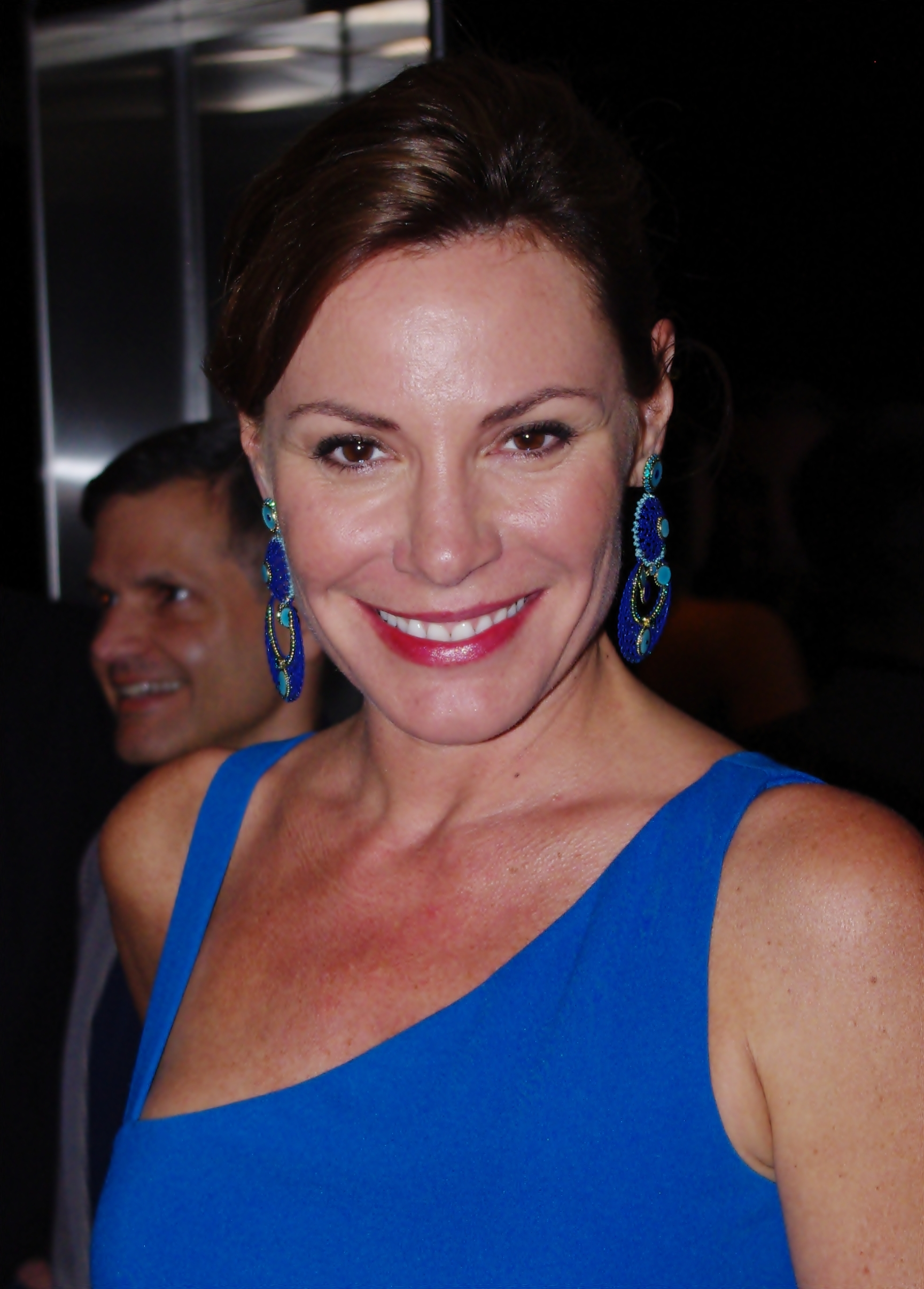
Luann de Lesseps

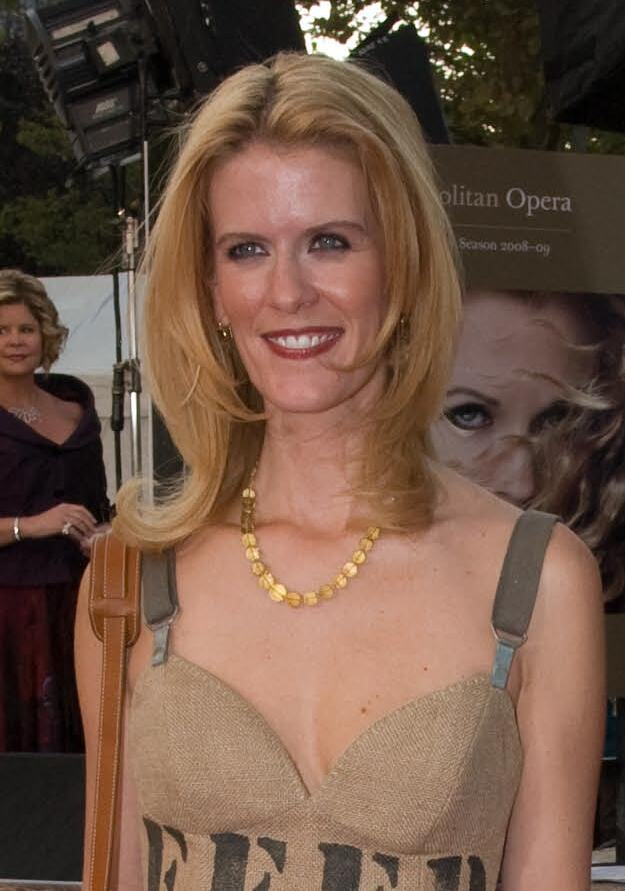
Alex McCord

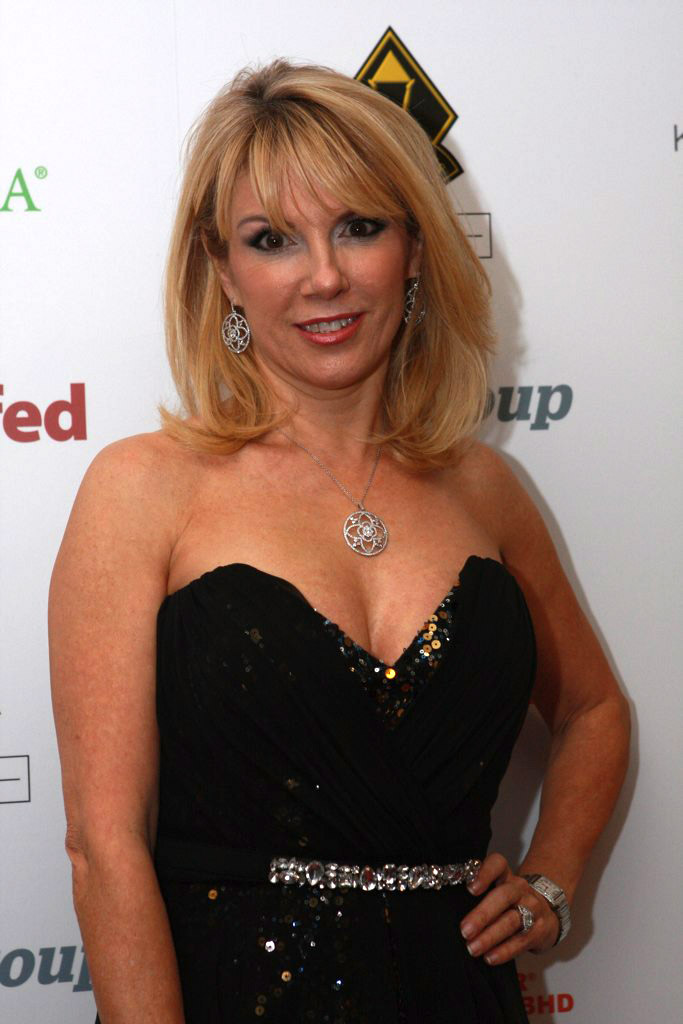
Ramona Singer

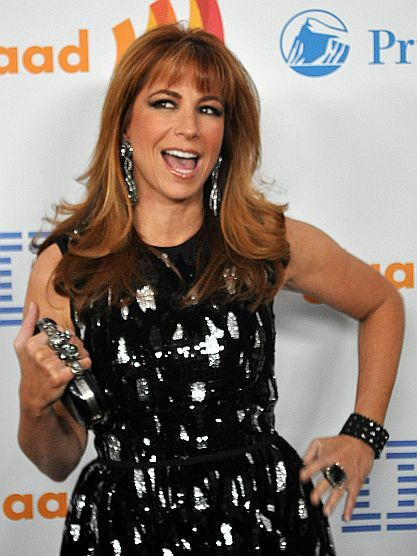
Jill Zarin

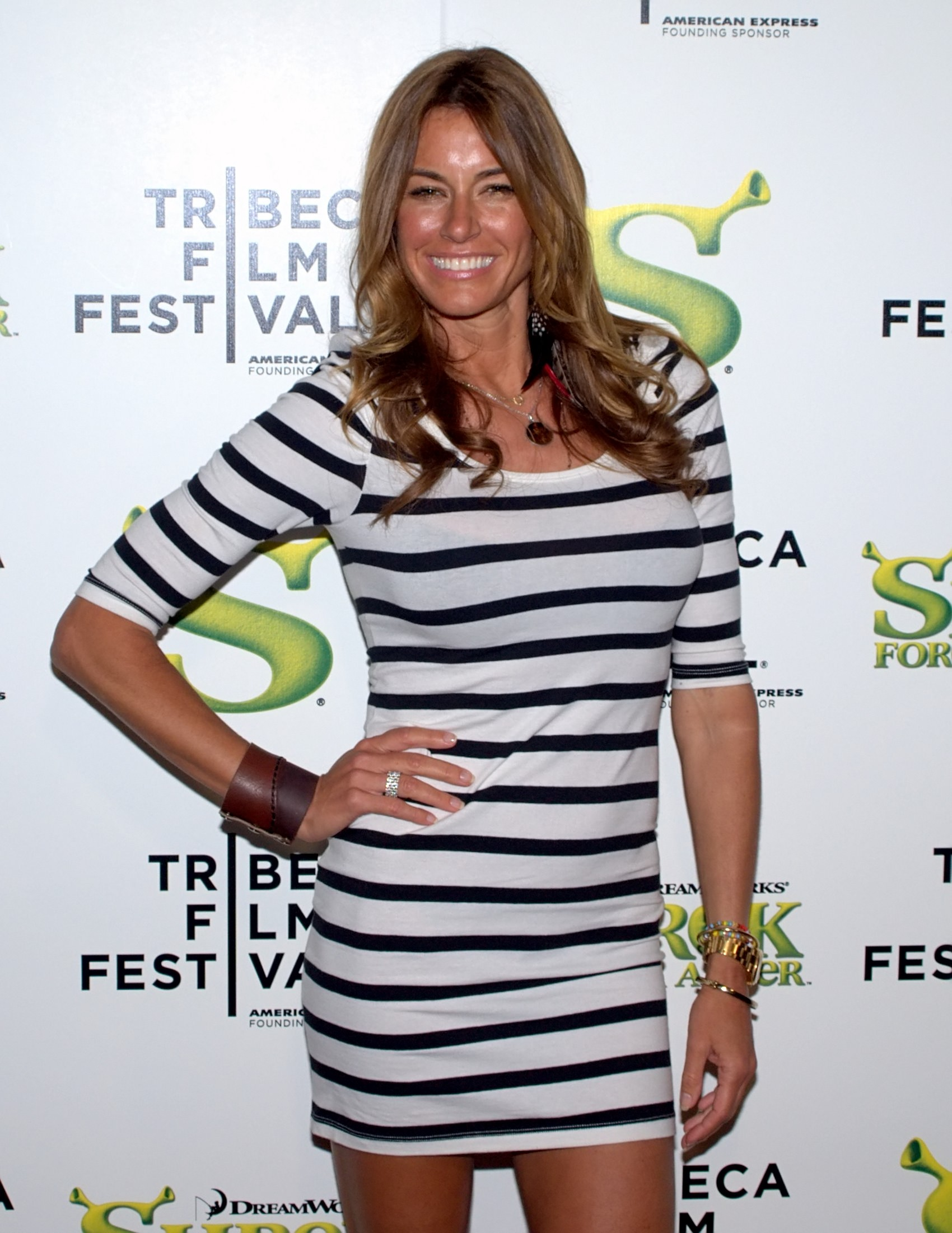
Kelly Killoren Bensimon

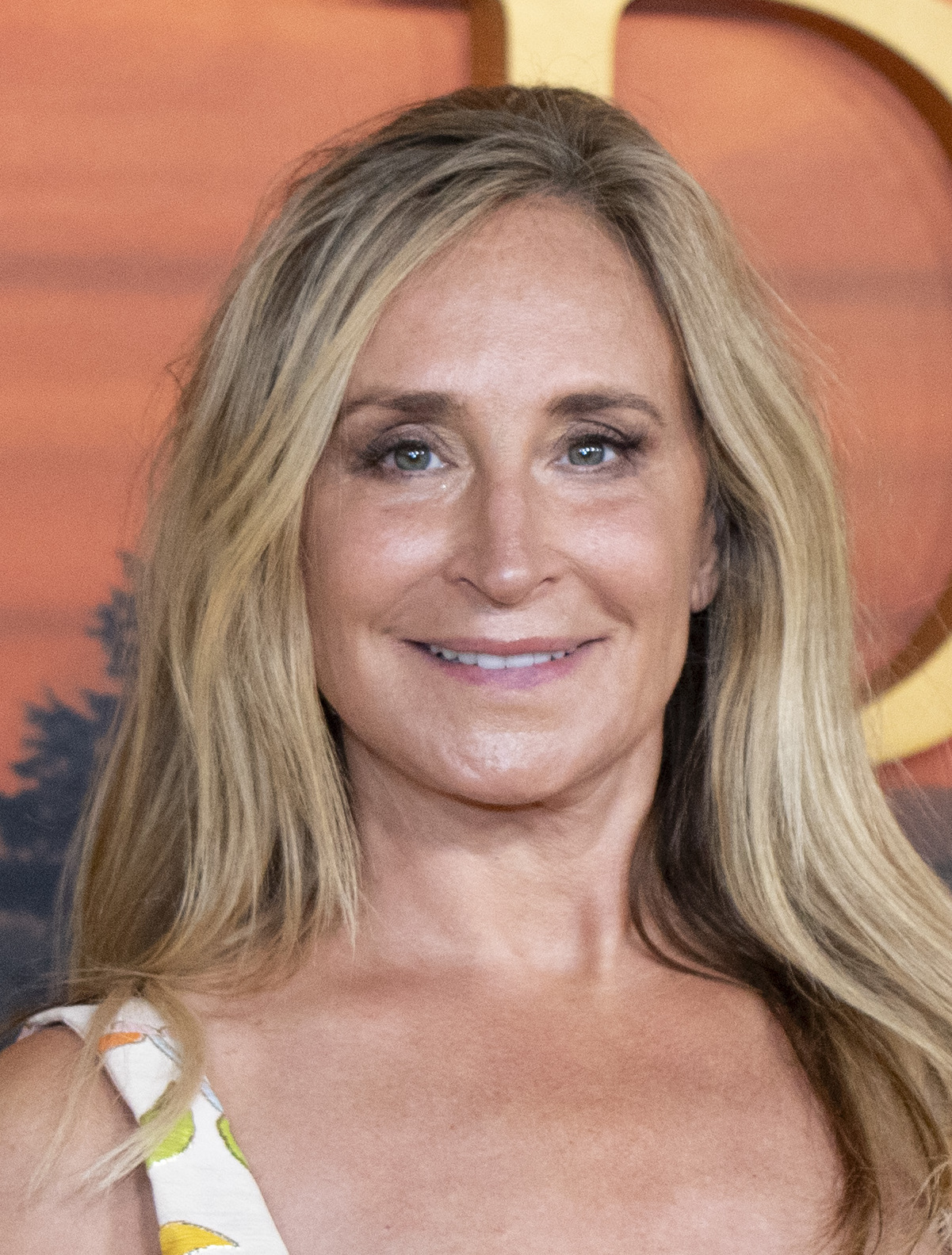
Sonja Morgan

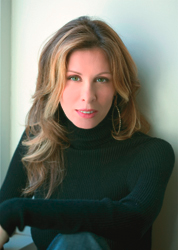
Carole Radziwill

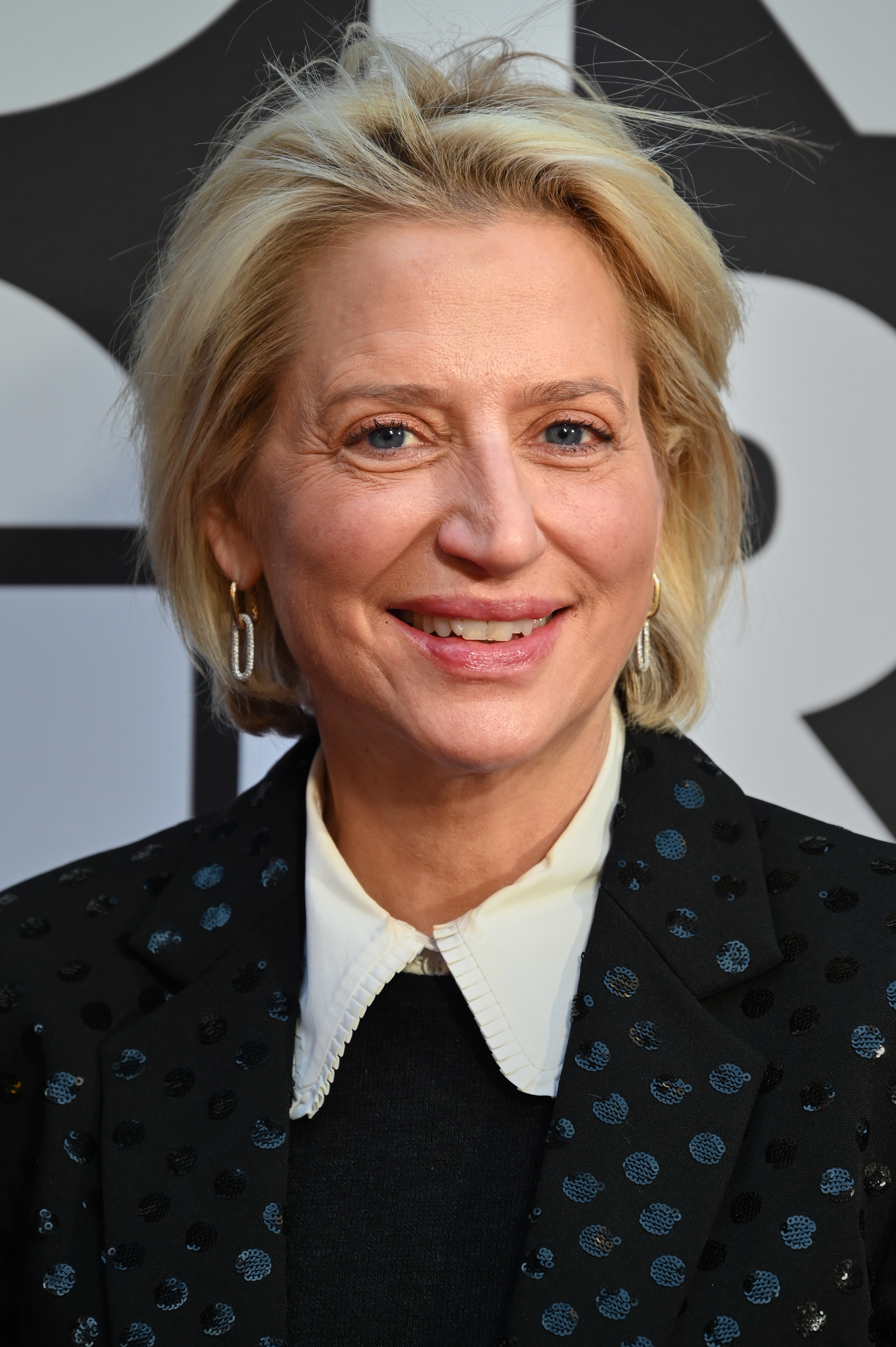
Dorinda Medley

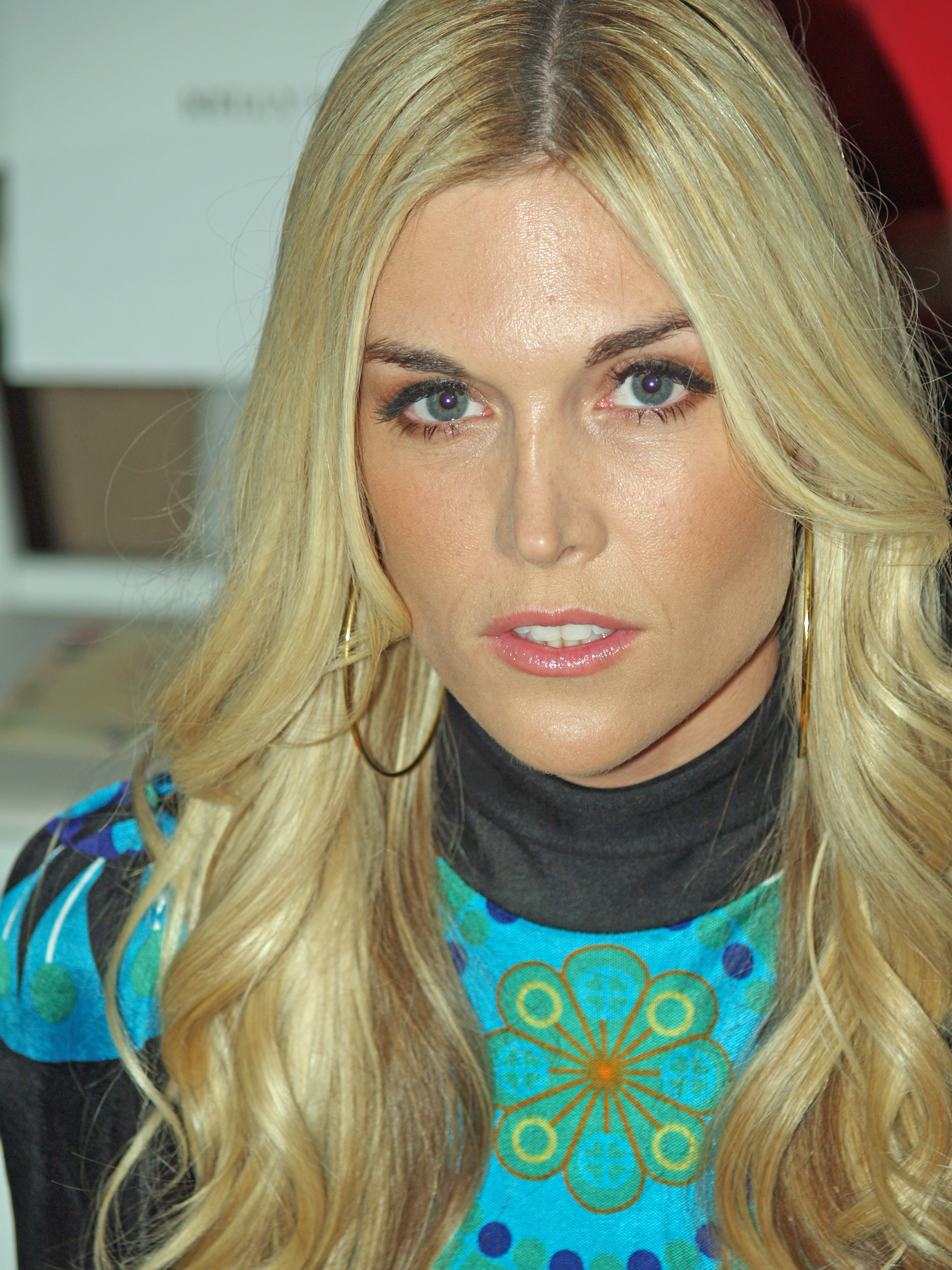
Tinsley Mortimer

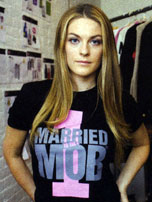
Leah McSweeney

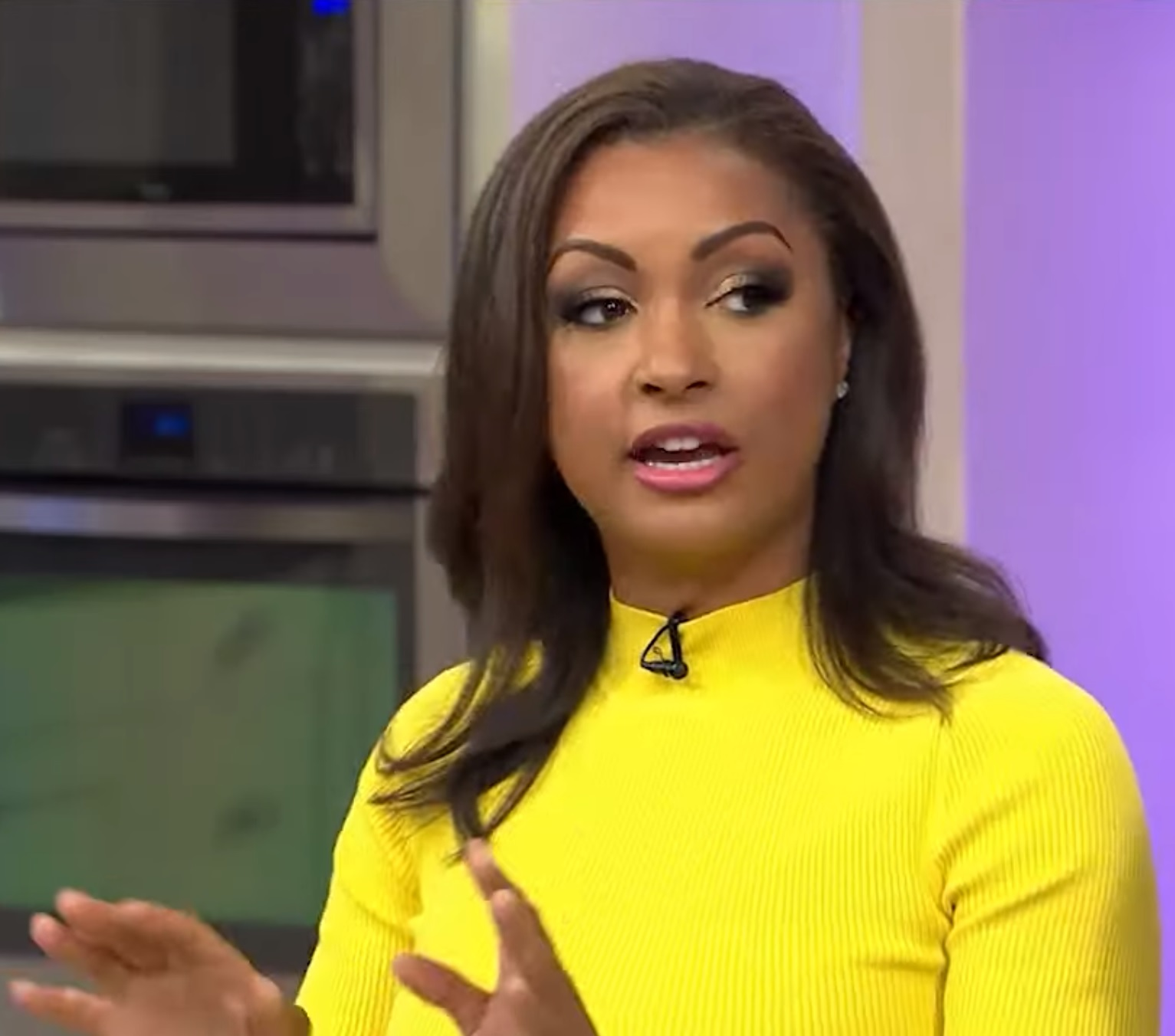
Eboni K. Williams

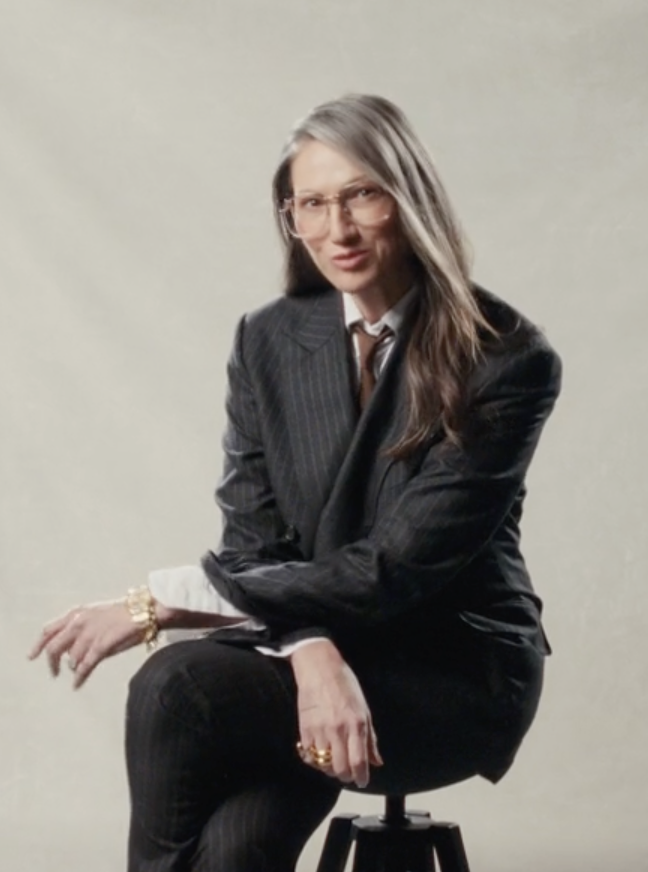
Jenna Lyons

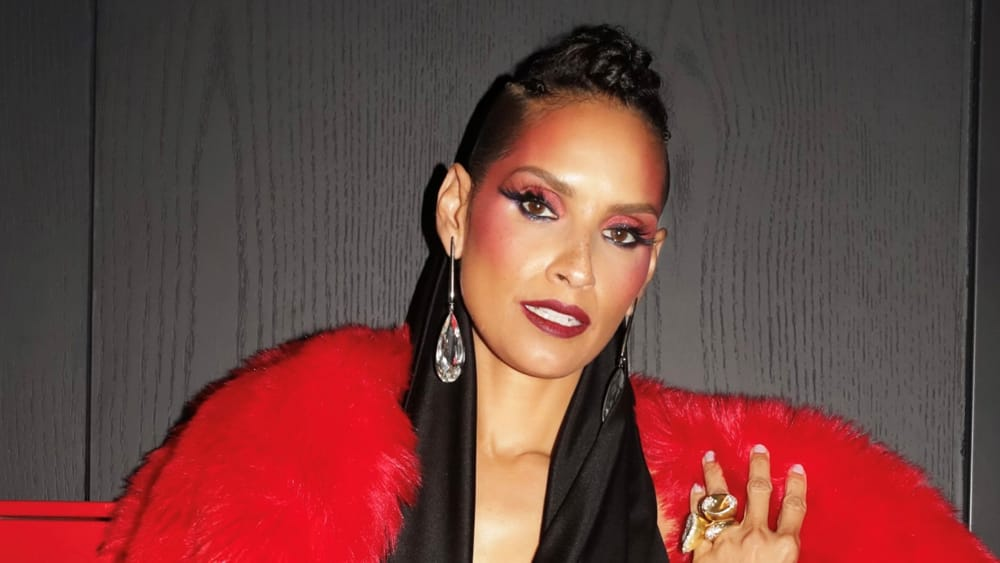
Racquel Chevremont

Cast members timeline
Cast member	Seasons															
Cast member	1	2	3	4	5	6	7	8	9	10	11	12	13	14	15	16
Bethenny Frankel	Main	Main	Main				Main	Main	Main	Main	Main					
Luann de Lesseps	Main	Main	Main	Main	Main	Friend	Main	Main	Main	Main	Main	Main	Main			
Alex McCord	Main	Main	Main	Main												
Ramona Singer	Main	Main	Main	Main	Main	Main	Main	Main	Main	Main	Main	Main	Main			
Jill Zarin	Main	Main	Main	Main					Guest	Guest	Guest	Guest				
Kelly Killoren Bensimon		Main	Main	Main		Guest	Guest									
Sonja Morgan			Main	Main	Main	Main	Main	Main	Main	Main	Main	Main	Main			
Cindy Barshop				Main												
Aviva Drescher					Main	Main										
Carole Radziwill					Main	Main	Main	Main	Main	Main						Main
Heather Thomson					Main	Main	Main	Guest	Guest	Guest		Guest	Friend			
Kristen Taekman						Main	Main									
Dorinda Medley				Guest			Main	Main	Main	Main	Main	Main				
Jules Wainstein								Main								
Tinsley Mortimer									Main	Main	Main	Main				
Leah McSweeney												Main	Main			
Eboni K. Williams													Main			
Sai De Silva														Main	Main	Main
Ubah Hassan														Main	Main	
Erin Lichy														Main	Main	Main
Jenna Lyons														Main	Main	
Jessel Taank														Main	Main	Main
Brynn Whitfield														Main	Main	
Racquel Chevremont															Main	
Hailey Glassman																Main
Erika Hammond																Main
Daisy Toye																Main
Friends of the housewives
Jennifer Gilbert			Friend		Guest											
Barbara Kavovit			Guest	Guest	Guest	Guest		Guest	Guest		Friend					
Elyse Slaine									Guest	Guest		Friend				
Bershan Shaw													Friend			
Rebecca Minkoff															Friend	
Devyn Simone													Guest			Friend

== Episodes ==
The Real Housewives of New York City original series episodes
Season	Episodes	Originally released		Average Viewers
Season	Episodes	First released	Last released	Average Viewers
1	9	March 4, 2008	May 27, 2008	1.20
2	15	February 17, 2009	May 28, 2009	1.69
3	18	March 4, 2010	June 24, 2010	2.00
4	18	April 7, 2011	August 1, 2011	2.04
5	21	June 4, 2012	October 22, 2012	1.58
6	23	March 11, 2014	August 12, 2014	1.29
7	24	April 7, 2015	September 17, 2015	1.28
8	23	April 6, 2016	September 14, 2016	1.53
9	22	April 5, 2017	August 30, 2017	1.50
10	22	April 4, 2018	September 5, 2018	1.37
11	20	March 6, 2019	July 25, 2019	1.28
12	25	April 2, 2020	October 1, 2020	1.11
13	18	May 4, 2021	September 4, 2021	0.82
14	16	July 16, 2023	October 29, 2023	0.51
15	17	October 1, 2024	February 4, 2025	0.40
16	TBA	September 8, 2026	TBA	TBA

== Critical reception ==
Then-current cast member Frankel stated in 2017 that she would like to see the series "represent New York more." Writing for The New York Times in October 2019, author Tracie Egan Morrissey posed the question, "If less than half of the city is white, why is 100 percent of the cast of The Real Housewives of New York City white?" Former cast member Heather Thomson also stated that during her time on the series she had pitched several women of color to the show's producers to diversify its cast members due to her concerns about the issue. The women also received backlash for highlighting the class divide in America through the ignorance and mistreatment of staff featured on the show.

The announcements of both the reboot and new cast of the show's fourteenth season have been criticized by some long-time viewers of the series, who argued that these were rash and poor decisions on Bravo's part. The reboot's cast has been deemed unappealing by these viewers, many of whom appreciated the franchise's specific focus on established spheres of older, upper-class New York socialites, labeling the choice to fill the new cast with "influencers" as a deviation from the show's original subject matter. The decision has been labeled as another move in Bravo's larger attempt to appeal the network to a younger and more social media-oriented audience.

In 2022, the Jewish Journal named Frankel and Zarin as two of "The Top 10 Jewish Reality TV Stars of All Time."

== Broadcast history ==
The Real Housewives of New York City airs regularly on Bravo in the United States; most episodes are approximately forty-two minutes in length, and are broadcast in standard definition and high definition. Since its premiere, the series has alternated airing on Monday, Tuesday, Wednesday and Thursday evenings and has been frequently shifted between the 8:00, 9:00, and 10:00 PM timeslots.

== Other media ==
In July 2012, Bravo released a social networking video game version of The Real Housewives of New York City titled as Real Housewives: The Game. Following weekly new episodes, a new game was available based on the story.

In 2016, On Location Tours hosted an official The Real Housewives of New York-themed tour in New York City. The tour is centered around giving passengers an almost four-hour trip to visit numerous places where current and former housewives "have dined, shopped, dated or had a fight or two," and is described as the "ultimate, one-of-a-kind Real Housewives experience."

On February 3, 2026, it was announced that several alumni from the franchise would appear in a new series. Produced by E! under the working title The Golden Life, the series will follow the lives of alum Bensimon, de Lesseps, Morgan, Singer, and Zarin as they navigate their "golden" years together in Palm Beach, Florida. Production for the ten episodes of the series is scheduled to begin in early 2026. Seven days later, Zarin was fired from the series, following racist posts made on social media concerning the Super Bowl LX halftime show and its headliner, Bad Bunny. Medley was named as Zarin's replacement.
