= Aviva Drescher =

American author

- Born: Aviva Teichner; September 9, 1970 (age 56); Manhattan, New York, USA
- Education: Vassar College (BA); New York University (MA); Yeshiva University (JD)
- Occupations: Television personality; lawyer; author
- Spouses: Harry Dubin (div. 2005) Reid Drescher (m. 2006)
- Children: 3

Aviva Drescher is an American television personality, former lawyer and author, best known for being on The Real Housewives of New York City.

== Early life ==
Aviva Drescher was born Aviva Teichner on September 9th, 1970, in Manhattan, New York, to parents George and Ingrid Teichner. Her dad was originally from Brooklyn, New York, and her mom was originally from Germany before immigrating to America. She was raised in the Upper West Side neighborhood. In 1977, when Drescher was six, she was visiting a friend who lived in Upstate New York. One night, she and her friend snuck up to ride a tractor. There, her foot got caught on a conveyor belt and churned, which resulted in her left leg requiring amputation.

When Drescher was 15, her parents took her to India to see a man whom they believed was an "avatar of a healing spirit" and could grow her leg back. Her mother struggled with alcoholism and passed away soon after.

Drescher attended The Fieldston School in New York City. After graduating high school, she graduated from Vassar College in Poughkeepsie, New York. She then went on to get her master's degree in French literature at New York University in Greenwich Village, Manhattan, and her Juris Doctor at the Benjamin N. Cardozo School of Law in Lower Manhattan.

== Career ==
In 2012, Drescher, along with Carole Radziwill and Heather Thomson, joined The Real Housewives of New York City cast for its fifth season.

In early 2014, she released a memoir titled Leggy Blonde about her upbringing and life after becoming an amputee.

In 2015, Drescher appeared on season 2 of Marriage Boot Camp: Reality Stars with her husband, Reid.

=== Season 6 finale of RHONY ===
On the season 6 finale of The Real Housewives of New York City, Drescher and fellow costar Heather Thomson were in a fight at the restaurant Le Cirque. The fight was about Aviva's lack of travel with the other housewives due to her phobias and fears, as well as the housewives believing she was exaggerating her asthma, in response to which Drescher brought an X-ray radiograph and announced her doctor had lied to her.

During the fight, Drescher yelled, "The only thing that is fake-...The only thing that is artificial, or fake about me...is this!", after which Drescher slammed her prosthetic leg on the table and later tossed it to Heather.

The moment was considered the most viral moment from season 6, having been tweeted about 23,891 times by July 25th, 2014. On RuPaul's Drag Race All Stars, contestant Alaska Thunderfuck references Aviva's leg throw at the season 2 reunion, with the clip having a million views on YouTube.

Andy Cohen, one of the executive producers for the show and the reunion host, said that Drescher planned the moment out and gave production a leg up to film it, but it still created one of the most infamous moments from the entire series.

=== Advocacy ===
Drescher is co-founder of the charity One Step Ahead, which helps amputees, mainly children. Drescher helped and spoke to survivors of the Boston bombing in 2013.

== Personal life ==
Drescher married Harry Dubin, but divorced in 2005. They had a son, Harrison. In 2006, she married Reid Drescher and had two children, Hudson and Sienna, and Drescher became a stepmom to Veronica, Reid's daughter from his previous marriage.

Reid is cousins with actress Fran Drescher. Aviva also works with Fran's charities, Trash Cancer and Cancer Shmancers.

== Bibliography ==
- Leggy Blonde: A Memoir. Gallery Books. 2014.
