= The Real Housewives of New York City season 10 =

Season of television series

The Real Housewives of New York City
- Season 10
- Cover used by the iTunes Store; Left to right: Mortimer, Morgan, Frankel, Singer, Medley, de Lesseps and Radziwill
- Starring: Bethenny Frankel; Luann de Lesseps; Ramona Singer; Sonja Morgan; Carole Radziwill; Dorinda Medley; Tinsley Mortimer
- No. of episodes: 22

Release
- Original network: Bravo
- Original release: April 4 – September 5, 2018

Season chronology
- ← Previous; Season 9 Next → Season 11

The tenth season of The Real Housewives of New York City, an American reality television series, was broadcast on Bravo. It premiered on April 4, 2018, and concluded on September 5, 2018. The series is primarily filmed in New York City. Its executive producers are Andrew Hoegl, Barrie Bernstein, Lisa Shannon, Pam Healy and Andy Cohen. The season focuses on the lives of Bethenny Frankel, Luann de Lesseps, Ramona Singer, Sonja Morgan, Carole Radziwill, Dorinda Medley and Tinsley Mortimer.

This season marked the first departure of Radziwill. She eventually returned for the series' sixteenth season.

== Cast and synopsis ==
For the tenth season, all seven of the housewives from the conclusion of the ninth season returned, making it the first time in the show's history the cast was unchanged between seasons. In addition, former housewives Heather Thompson and Jill Zarin made guest appearances during the season. On July 25, 2018, Carole Radziwill announced that the tenth season would be her last, following her decision to depart the show. In a statement to E! Online, she said: "After six seasons on Bravo's RHONYC, I have decided to return to what I do best — journalism and producing. I am sure this does not come as a surprise to any of the viewers, all of whom have been supportive, encouraging, and kind."

== Episodes ==
The Real Housewives of New York City season 10 episodes
No. overall	No. in season	Title	Original release date	U.S. viewers (millions)
174	1	"Gouls Just Wanna Have Fun"	April 4, 2018	1.39
The ladies of New York are back after an eventful summer. Newly divorced Luann sits down with Dorinda and starts to open up about her relationship with Tom. Meanwhile, Bethenny mourns an unexpected death in the family. Typically reluctant to exercise, Carole preps to run the New York City marathon. All the ladies reunite when Dorinda throws an epic Halloween party that nobody will forget.
175	2	"Running Your Mouth"	April 11, 2018	1.27
Sonja makes hurtful accusations about Tinsley's finances. Dorinda attempts to improve her friendship with Sonja. Carole runs the New York City Marathon after months of training, but with a surprising omission in her cheering section.
176	3	"Til Brunch Do Us Part"	April 18, 2018	1.34
The ladies head to the Hamptons for a fun-filled weekend, but tensions rise between best friends Carole and Bethenny. Dorinda and Sonja's friendship is short-lived, as a blowup at Luann's brunch sets their relationship back.
177	4	"War and P.O.S."	April 25, 2018	1.43
Tensions boil over between Dorinda and Sonja at Luan's brunch. At Ramona's dinner party, Tinsley delivers a low blow to Sonja that shocks the whole party. Sonja calls out Ramona for not being a true friend in a text message.
178	5	"Tea for Tat"	May 2, 2018	1.37
Back in New York City, Tinsley gets a surprise delivery. Carole and Luann talk through the miscommunications that have been plaguing their friendship. Luann runs into Tom's old fling, and shouting match erupts between Sonja and Ramona.
179	6	"Grief and Relief"	May 9, 2018	1.44
Carole reveals shocking news about her relationship with Adam and Sonja prepares her townhouse for renters. At an important business dinner in Miami with Bethenny's relief team, Dorinda jeopardizes her chances of going to Puerto Rico.
180	7	"On an Island"	May 16, 2018	1.41
Bethenny and Dorinda hit the ground in Puerto Rico and get to work. Ramona attempts to mend fences with Sonja while Carole works on a revealing story with a magazine. Luann starts to plan a special performance.
181	8	"A Frittered Friendship"	May 23, 2018	1.23
The ladies make their annual visit to the Berkshires. Carole confides in Dorinda and Ramona about some tension with Bethenny. The ladies get decked out for a 1920's murder mystery dinner party taking place at Blue Stone Manor.
182	9	"Holidazed and Confused"	May 30, 2018	1.45
Carole and Bethenny continue to hash out their issues during the murder mystery dinner party. Back in the city, Bethenny's holiday party is interrupted by a surprise, which leads to hurt feelings. Luann gets arrested over the holiday.
183	10	"You Broke the Penal Code"	June 6, 2018	1.39
Weeks after Luann's arrest, she's still the talk of the town. While she's in rehab, the ladies try to piece together what happened. Bethenny throws a launch party for her line of jeans. Sonja flees her construction site and spends a night with Tinsley.
184	11	"Faux Weddings and a Funeral"	June 13, 2018	1.40
Tinsley tries on wedding dresses with her mother, Dale. While Luann ends her stint in rehab, the women tough it out during a prison-style workout. Bethenny and Jill Zarin share an intimate moment following the funeral for Jill's husband, Bobby.
185	12	"Every Mayflower Has Its Thorn"	June 20, 2018	1.37
Luann gets out of rehab and the ladies whisk her away for a spa weekend in Connecticut. The relaxation doesn't last long as Luann discovers that Ramona tried to get an invite to Tom's New Year's Eve party. Dorinda and Sonja clash over family letters.
186	13	"Arrest and Relaxation"	June 27, 2018	1.38
Luann deals with unwanted press after Ramona post a picture of the ladies at dinner. Dorinda confronts Bethenny about lingering tension and Bethenny puts Tinsley on the spot over wedding dress shopping. Dorinda's ongoing issues with Sonja reach a fever pitch. Luann confronts Ramona about disloyalty.
187	14	"Dating Wishes and Cabaret Dreams"	July 11, 2018	1.31
Luann prepares for her upcoming cabaret show and Bethenny creates a dating profile for Sonja. Tinsley moves into her new penthouse, without Scott's help and the women attend a speed-dating event. The ladies decide to go on a trip to Cartagena, Colombia.
188	15	"Wigging Out"	July 18, 2018	1.36
The women arrive in Cartagena, Colombia for their vacation. Bethenny has an allergic reaction and Luann reveals a shocking new look. An injured Ramona gets wheeled around the cobblestone streets. Bethenny clashes with Dorinda and Carole.
189	16	"Guess Who's Arguing at Dinner?"	July 25, 2018	1.48
As the ladies head out to shop in Cartagena, Bethenny continues to unravel, and the women's patience with her begins to run out. Carole approaches Sonja for insight on Bethenny, and a comment Luann makes about Dorinda sends her off the deep end.
190	17	"Ship Happens"	August 1, 2018	1.50
Tensions arise at breakfast as Luann and Dorinda continue their argument from the night before. The ladies ditch the city for a private island, but the day ends with a traumatic boat ride as the women are rushed off the island.
191	18	"There's No Place Like Home"	August 8, 2018	1.37
Ramona shows off her newly renovated Hamptons home and Sonja stands firm on the asking price for her townhouse. Bethenny invites Dorinda to her new apartment. Adam shows up bearing gifts at Carole's athletic-chic Cosmopolitan Magazine party.
192	19	"Life Is a Cabaret"	August 15, 2018	1.24
It's the night of Luann's cabaret show, "Countess and Friends". During the performance, Luann gets heckled, and Sonja shows some skin. At the after party, Ramona has a burning question for Bethenny, while Dorinda has some parting words for Luann.
193	20	"Reunion Part 1"	August 22, 2018	1.27
The ladies relive some of the fun times they had this season, gathering to discuss the year's events with one glaring absence. The women also pay tribute to Bobby Zarin while questioning Bethenny's motives for attending his funeral. Dorinda confronts questions about her biting tongue, and Bethenny defends herself when a few of the others gang up on her. Finally, every gets a lesson in graciousness from Dorinda, and they take a look back at some of their questionable wardrobe choices.
194	21	"Reunion Part 2"	August 29, 2018	1.39
Dorinda defends herself against accusations that she might have a drinking problem. The ladies discuss Luann's obvious absence and share their observations of her recent behavior. Tinsley reveals startling details about her relationship with Scott. Bethenny and Carole dive into what caused the seismic shift in their friendship and call each other out for comments made both on and off the show.
195	22	"Reunion Part 3"	September 5, 2018	1.26
Bethenny and Carole continue to discuss the dissolution of their friendship. The women relive their stomach churning trip to Colombia and Sonja talks about a new chapter in her life. The women share their biggest regrets of the season.
