= The Real Housewives of New York City season 16 =

Season of American reality television series

The Real Housewives of New York City
- Season 16
- Promotional poster
- Starring: Carole Radziwill; Sai de Silva; Erin Lichy; Jessel Taank; Hailey Glassman; Erika Hammond; Daisy Toye
- No. of episodes: 11

Release
- Original network: Bravo
- Original release: September 8, 2026 – present

Season chronology
- ← Previous; Season 15

The sixteenth season of the American reality television series The Real Housewives of New York City, premiered on Bravo on September 8, 2026. The season is produced by Warner Bros. Television Studios's Shed Media and is primarily filmed in New York City, New York.

Sai de Silva, Erin Lichy, and Jessel Taank returned as main cast members following the conclusion of the previous season. This season also marked the full-time return of Carole Radziwill, who had not been a full-time cast member since the tenth season. Additionally, Hailey Glassman, Erika Hammond and Daisy Toye joined as new main cast members.

== Cast ==
In February 2025, Rebecca Minkoff announced her exit from the series after joining for the fifteenth season. Four months later, Brynn Whitfield announced her departure from the series after two seasons, citing her decision to step away from reality television. In August 2025, it was reported that producers were considering rebooting the cast, with Summer House co-stars Paige DeSorbo and Lindsay Hubbard, as well as makeup artist Daisy Toye named as potential new housewives. At BravoCon in November 2025, Andy Cohen revealed information regarding season and its cast would be announced "soon". That same month, Lyons announced her exit, disclosing that she had been invited back in a "friend of" capacity; however, due to her unwillingness to film her personal life, she decided to not return.

In March 2026, Bravo announced Erin Lichy, Sai de Silva, and Jessel Taank would return for the season. Along with the returnees, Hailey Glassman, Erika Hammond, and Toye were announced as new housewives. Carole Radziwill, who was a housewife from seasons five to ten, was announced as returning in a "friend of" capacity. Production was set to begin the week of March 2. Two months later, it was reported that Devyn Simone had joined the cast as a friend. The season premiered on September 8, 2026. Upon the season's announcement, it was revealed that Radziwill had been promoted to a series regular, along with cameo appearances by Martha Stewart.

== Production ==
Bravo announced filming for the sixteenth season would begin the week of March 2, 2026. The season is produced by Shed Media by executive producers Lisa Shannon and Lori Gordon. Additional executive producers include Andy Cohen, Tia Ayers, Kate Murphy and Alfonso Rosales.

== Episodes ==
The Real Housewives of New York City season 16 episodes
No. overall	No. in season	Title	Original release date
292	1	"The Price of Perfection"	September 8, 2026
293	2	"Much Ado About Brunching"	September 15, 2026
294	3	"A Seder in Brooklyn"	September 22, 2026
295	4	"Gloves Off at the Gala"	September 29, 2026
296	5	"Trouble in Paradise"	October 6, 2026
297	6	"Moskito Madness"	October 13, 2026
298	7	"Loveless Island"	October 20, 2026
299	8	"Havana Fights"	October 27, 2026
300	9	"All Bark, No Invite"	November 3, 2026
301	10	"Joke's on You"	November 10, 2026
302	11	"Peeling Back the Layers"	November 17, 2026
303	12	TBA	December 1, 2026
304	13	TBA	December 8, 2026
305	14	TBA	December 15, 2026

== Reception ==
Following the season premiere, Vogue culture writer Emma Specter published an article listing sixty thoughts she concerning the series' return, which noted the exits of Racquel Chevremont, Ubah Hassan, Lyons and Whitfield, and noted the return of Radziwill. Following a private viewing of the premiere episode and a singular scene from the season's second episode, Entertainment Weekly editorial director Sarah Hearon felt the premiere had "far exceed" expectations, and that the episode had the makings for what she called a "solid" season. In their recap of the premiere, Vulture described it as "fun, zippy, honest, funny, and dramatic". In a post on his Substack "Obsessed", The Daily Beast editor Kevin Fallon felt the stakes were high in the season's reboot following the reboot of the fourteenth season following the previous season's backlash. However, he noted the season began with a "bang". The New York Times named the season on its list of eleven shows to watch for the week of September 7, 2026.
