= List of The Real Housewives of New York City episodes =

The Real Housewives of New York City is an American reality television series that debuted on Bravo on March 4, 2008. The series' sixteenth season chronicles seven women in New York City — Carole Radziwill, Sai De Silva, Erin Lichy, Jessel Taank, Hailey Glassman, Erika Hammond and Daisy Toye —as they balance their personal and business lives, along with their social circle.

Former cast members featured over the previous seasons are: Bethenny Frankel (1–3, 7–11), Luann de Lesseps (1–5, 7–13), Alex McCord (1–4), Ramona Singer (1–13), Jill Zarin (1–4), Kelly Killoren Bensimon (2–4), Sonja Morgan (3–13), Cindy Barshop (4), Aviva Drescher (5–6), Heather Thomson (5–7), Kristen Taekman (6–7), Dorinda Medley (7–12), Jules Wainstein (8), Tinsley Mortimer (9–12), Leah McSweeney (12-13), Eboni K. Williams (13), Ubah Hassan (14–15), Jenna Lyons (14–15), Brynn Whitfield (14-15), and Racquel Chevremont (15). As of November 17, 2026, 302 episodes of The Real Housewives of New York City have aired, currently in its sixteenth season.

== Series overview ==
The Real Housewives of New York City original series episodes
Season	Episodes	Originally released		Average Viewers
Season	Episodes	First released	Last released	Average Viewers
1	9	March 4, 2008	May 27, 2008	1.20
2	15	February 17, 2009	May 28, 2009	1.69
3	18	March 4, 2010	June 24, 2010	2.00
4	18	April 7, 2011	August 1, 2011	2.04
5	21	June 4, 2012	October 22, 2012	1.58
6	23	March 11, 2014	August 12, 2014	1.29
7	24	April 7, 2015	September 17, 2015	1.28
8	23	April 6, 2016	September 14, 2016	1.53
9	22	April 5, 2017	August 30, 2017	1.50
10	22	April 4, 2018	September 5, 2018	1.37
11	20	March 6, 2019	July 25, 2019	1.28
12	25	April 2, 2020	October 1, 2020	1.11
13	18	May 4, 2021	September 4, 2021	0.82
14	16	July 16, 2023	October 29, 2023	0.51
15	17	October 1, 2024	February 4, 2025	0.40
16	TBA	September 8, 2026	TBA	TBA

== Episodes ==
=== Season 1 (2008) ===
Bethenny Frankel, Luann de Lesseps, Alex McCord, Ramona Singer and Jill Zarin are introduced as series regulars.

The Real Housewives of New York City season 1 episodes
No. overall	No. in season	Title	Original release date	U.S. viewers (millions)
1	1	"Meet the Wives"	March 4, 2008	0.82
2	2	"The Hamptons"	March 11, 2008	N/A
3	3	"Fashion Week"	March 18, 2008	N/A
4	4	"Social Wife"	March 25, 2008	1.14
5	5	"Careful, She Bites"	April 1, 2008	N/A
6	6	"Girl's Night Out"	April 8, 2008	N/A
7	7	"Second Chances"	April 15, 2008	1.43
8	8	"Reunion"	April 22, 2008	N/A
9	9	"The Lost Footage"	May 27, 2008	1.06

=== Season 2 (2009) ===
Kelly Killoren Bensimon joined the cast.

The Real Housewives of New York City season 2 episodes
No. overall	No. in season	Title	Original release date	U.S. viewers (millions)
10	1	"There's a New Girl in Town"	February 17, 2009	1.64
11	2	"Hamptons Retreat... But No Surrender"	February 24, 2009	1.86
12	3	"On Their High Horses"	March 3, 2009	N/A
13	4	"If You Have Nothing Nice to Say..."	March 10, 2009	N/A
14	5	"New York State of Mind"	March 17, 2009	N/A
15	6	"Runway Run-In"	March 24, 2009	N/A
16	7	"Kelly vs. Bethenny"	March 31, 2009	N/A
17	8	"Game, Set, Feud"	April 7, 2009	1.74
18	9	"Wife in the Fast Lane"	April 14, 2009	N/A
19	10	"Unfashionably Late"	April 21, 2009	N/A
20	11	"Van Kempens House Party"	April 28, 2009	N/A
21	12	"Charity Wives"	May 5, 2009	2.03
22	13	"Reunion — Part 1"	May 12, 2009	2.29
23	14	"Reunion — Part 2"	May 14, 2009	1.53
24	15	"The Lost Footage"	May 28, 2009	N/A

=== Season 3 (2010) ===
Sonja Morgan joined the cast. Jennifer Gilbert served in a recurring capacity.

The Real Housewives of New York City season 3 episodes
No. overall	No. in season	Title	Original release date	U.S. viewers (millions)
25	1	"New Alliances"	March 4, 2010	2.04
26	2	"Dueling Labor Day Parties"	March 11, 2010	1.98
27	3	"Fall in Manhattan"	March 18, 2010	1.75
28	4	"Fashion and Fighting"	March 25, 2010	1.74
29	5	"Hot Off the Press"	April 1, 2010	1.53
30	6	"The Ambush"	April 8, 2010	1.85
31	7	"New Girl, Old Money"	April 15, 2010	N/A
32	8	"Let's See That Ring"	April 22, 2010	1.74
33	9	"Stay on Message"	April 29, 2010	N/A
34	10	"Leap Before You Look"	May 6, 2010	2.25
35	11	"Housewives Overboard"	May 13, 2010	2.08
36	12	"Sun, Sand and Psychosis"	May 20, 2010	2.32
37	13	"Shunburn"	May 27, 2010	2.56
38	14	"Rebuked, Reunited, Renewed"	June 3, 2010	2.64
39	15	"Reunion — Part 1"	June 10, 2010	2.24
40	16	"Reunion — Part 2"	June 14, 2010	2.05
41	17	"Reunion — Part 3"	June 17, 2010	2.06
42	18	"The Lost Footage"	June 24, 2010	1.44

=== Season 4 (2011) ===
Frankel departed as a series regular. Cindy Barshop joined the cast.

The Real Housewives of New York City season 4 episodes
No. overall	No. in season	Title	Original release date	U.S. viewers (millions)
43	1	"Grin and Bare It"	April 7, 2011	1.97
44	2	"March Madness"	April 14, 2011	1.86
45	3	"Hairy Mess"	April 21, 2011	1.93
46	4	"Ramona'd"	April 28, 2011	1.87
47	5	"Follow Pecking Orders"	May 5, 2011	1.83
48	6	"The Mask Has Two Faces"	May 12, 2011	1.79
49	7	"Travel Reservations"	May 19, 2011	1.80
50	8	"Misfortune Teller"	May 26, 2011	2.29
51	9	"A Riad Divided"	June 2, 2011	2.28
52	10	"Last Call, Morocco!"	June 9, 2011	2.26
53	11	"Debt Becomes Her"	June 16, 2011	2.04
54	12	"Sixteen and Skip the Sweet"	June 23, 2011	2.14
55	13	"Your Tweeting Heart"	June 30, 2011	1.93
56	14	"Burlesque is More"	July 7, 2011	2.02
57	15	"Video Killed the Countess"	July 14, 2011	2.17
58	16	"L.O.V.E. Duel"	July 21, 2011	2.45
59	17	"Reunion — Part 1"	July 25, 2011	2.33
60	18	"Reunion — Part 2"	August 1, 2011	1.78

=== Season 5 (2012) ===
McCord, Zarin, Killoren Bensimon and Barshop departed as series regulars. Aviva Drescher, Carole Radziwill and Heather Thomson joined the cast.

The Real Housewives of New York City season 5 episodes
No. overall	No. in season	Title	Original release date	U.S. viewers (millions)
61	1	"A New New York"	June 4, 2012	1.66
62	2	"Say What You Mean, Just Don't Say It Mean"	June 11, 2012	1.43
63	3	"Boozy Brunch"	June 18, 2012	1.39
64	4	"Diss-Invite"	June 25, 2012	1.46
65	5	"The Cool Girls"	July 2, 2012	1.39
66	6	"I'm U.K., You're U.K."	July 9, 2012	1.30
67	7	"Good Trip, Bad Fall"	July 16, 2012	1.39
68	8	"Blinded by the Wine"	July 23, 2012	1.51
69	9	"Dirty Ol' Dad"	July 30, 2012	1.55
70	10	"You Want to What Me in the Where?"	August 6, 2012	1.44
71	11	"This Party Is Toast"	August 13, 2012	1.65
72	12	"All How You Spin It"	August 20, 2012	1.65
73	13	"Pirate Booty Call"	August 27, 2012	1.82
74	14	"Slutty Island"	September 3, 2012	1.93
75	15	"Vacation, All I Never Wanted"	September 10, 2012	1.80
76	16	"What Happens in St. Barths Doesn't Stay in St. Barths"	September 17, 2012	1.99
77	17	"Don't Make Room for Daddy"	September 24, 2012	1.70
78	18	"All's Well That Doesn't End Well"	October 1, 2012	1.83
79	19	"Reunion — Part 1"	October 8, 2012	1.70
80	20	"Reunion — Part 2"	October 15, 2012	1.72
81	21	"The Lost Footage"	October 22, 2012	0.93

=== Season 6 (2014) ===
de Lesseps departed as a series regular; she continued to appear in a recurring capacity. Kristen Taekman joined the cast.

The Real Housewives of New York City season 6 episodes
No. overall	No. in season	Title	Original release date	U.S. viewers (millions)
82	1	"If You Can Make It Here"	March 11, 2014	1.33
83	2	"Give Up the Ghostwriter"	March 18, 2014	1.31
84	3	"Model Behavior"	March 25, 2014	1.44
85	4	"Holla in the Hamptons"	April 1, 2014	1.29
86	5	"Everybody Thinks We're Drag Queens"	April 8, 2014	1.20
87	6	"Unhappy Anniversary"	April 15, 2014	1.26
88	7	"Fireworks"	April 22, 2014	1.38
89	8	"Unforgivable Debt"	April 29, 2014	1.46
90	9	"The Last Splash"	May 6, 2014	1.48
91	10	"Bon Voyage Ramona"	May 13, 2014	1.43
92	11	"The Ramona Trap"	May 20, 2014	1.20
93	12	"Requiem for a Poodle"	May 27, 2014	1.17
94	13	"Win, Place or Sonja"	June 3, 2014	1.13
95	14	"Sex, Lies and Facials"	June 10, 2014	1.13
96	15	"Ten Gallon Spats"	June 17, 2014	1.01
97	16	"Go Yell It on the Mountain"	June 24, 2014	1.27
98	17	"Bury the Hatchet"	July 1, 2014	1.15
99	18	"Something to Sing About"	July 8, 2014	1.29
100	19	"There's Something About Harry"	July 15, 2014	1.13
101	20	"The Last Leg"	July 22, 2014	1.50
102	21	"Reunion — Part 1"	July 29, 2014	1.31
103	22	"Reunion — Part 2"	August 5, 2014	1.51
104	23	"Reunion — Part 3"	August 12, 2014	1.31

=== Season 7 (2015) ===
Drescher departed as a series regular. Frankel and de Lesseps rejoined the cast as series regulars. Dorinda Medley joined the cast.

The Real Housewives of New York City season 7 episodes
No. overall	No. in season	Title	Original release date	U.S. viewers (millions)
105	1	"The B Is Back"	April 7, 2015	1.57
106	2	"New House, Old Grudges"	April 14, 2015	1.52
107	3	"Battle of the Brunches"	April 21, 2015	1.45
108	4	"The Art of Being a Cougar"	April 28, 2015	1.30
109	5	"Mind Your Own Business"	May 5, 2015	1.31
110	6	"Double Down on Delusion"	May 12, 2015	1.39
111	7	"Family Matters"	May 19, 2015	1.09
112	8	"The Cavi-Art of War"	May 26, 2015	1.30
113	9	"Birthday in the Berks"	June 2, 2015	1.18
114	10	"Pop of Crazy"	June 9, 2015	1.23
115	11	"Fashionably Fired Up"	June 16, 2015	1.16
116	12	"Lord of the Manor"	June 23, 2015	1.41
117	13	"Sonja Island"	June 30, 2015	1.27
118	14	"Conch Blocked"	July 7, 2015	1.36
119	15	"Don't Be All, Like, Uncool"	July 14, 2015	1.51
120	16	"Awfully Charitable"	July 21, 2015	1.24
121	17	"London Calling"	July 28, 2015	1.11
122	18	"Rumble on the Runway"	August 4, 2015	1.24
123	19	"New Beginnings, My Ass"	August 11, 2015	1.41
124	20	"Reunion — Part 1"	August 18, 2015	1.31
125	21	"Reunion — Part 2"	August 25, 2015	1.39
126	22	"Reunion — Part 3"	August 27, 2015	0.84
127	23	"Secrets Revealed"	September 3, 2015	0.70
128	24	"100th Special: Watch What Happens Live Special"	September 17, 2015	N/A

=== Season 8 (2016) ===
Thomson and Taekman departed as series regulars. Jules Wainstein joined the cast.

The Real Housewives of New York City season 8 episodes
No. overall	No. in season	Title	Original release date	U.S. viewers (millions)
129	1	"Start Spreading the News"	April 6, 2016	1.25
130	2	"An Intimates Affair"	April 13, 2016	1.24
131	3	"The Biggest Boob"	April 20, 2016	1.43
132	4	"BBQ, Brunch, or Bust"	April 27, 2016	1.32
133	5	"Birthday Bashing"	May 4, 2016	1.32
134	6	"Tipsying Point"	May 11, 2016	1.31
135	7	"Airing Your Dirty Laundry"	May 18, 2016	1.30
136	8	"All the Countess's Men"	May 25, 2016	1.56
137	9	"December: Berkshires County"	June 1, 2016	1.61
138	10	"Unhappy Holidays"	June 8, 2016	1.52
139	11	"Invitation Interrupted"	June 15, 2016	1.60
140	12	"Always the Bitch, Never the Bride"	June 22, 2016	1.38
141	13	"Steel Calzones"	June 29, 2016	1.57
142	14	"The Benefits of Friendship"	July 6, 2016	1.62
143	15	"All Bets Are Off"	July 13, 2016	1.53
144	16	"The Countess Bride"	July 20, 2016	1.32
145	17	"And Away We Finally Go"	July 27, 2016	1.43
146	18	"Body of Evidence"	August 3, 2016	1.79
147	19	"Tomfoolery"	August 17, 2016	1.78
148	20	"Say It Ain't So"	August 24, 2016	1.96
149	21	"Reunion Part 1"	August 31, 2016	1.82
150	22	"Reunion Part 2"	September 7, 2016	1.81
151	23	"Reunion Part 3"	September 14, 2016	1.76

=== Season 9 (2017) ===
Wainstein departed as a series regular. Tinsley Mortimer joined the cast.

The Real Housewives of New York City season 9 episodes
No. overall	No. in season	Title	Original release date	U.S. viewers (millions)
152	1	"Talk of the Town"	April 5, 2017	1.27
153	2	"It Girl, Interrupted"	April 12, 2017	1.29
154	3	"A New Low"	April 19, 2017	1.38
155	4	"The Etiquette of Friendship"	April 26, 2017	1.43
156	5	"The Politics of Friendship"	May 3, 2017	1.36
157	6	"Wishful Invitation"	May 10, 2017	1.31
158	7	"Bidding on Love"	May 17, 2017	1.33
159	8	"Return of the Berserkshires"	May 24, 2017	1.25
160	9	"Two Weeks Notice"	May 31, 2017	1.61
161	10	"Black Out and Get Out"	June 7, 2017	1.61
162	11	"A Countess No More"	June 14, 2017	1.69
163	12	"Regency Reunion"	June 21, 2017	1.59
164	13	"A Bronx Tale"	June 28, 2017	1.45
165	14	"A Slippery Slope"	July 5, 2017	1.63
166	15	"Oil and Vinegar"	July 12, 2017	1.55
167	16	"Three Tequila… Floor!"	July 19, 2017	1.70
168	17	"Tequila-thon"	July 26, 2017	1.78
169	18	"Make Out, Make Up"	August 2, 2017	1.64
170	19	"Thank You and Good Night"	August 9, 2017	1.72
171	20	"Reunion Part 1"	August 16, 2017	1.62
172	21	"Reunion Part 2"	August 23, 2017	1.39
173	22	"Reunion Part 3"	August 30, 2017	1.47

=== Season 10 (2018) ===
The Real Housewives of New York City season 10 episodes
No. overall	No. in season	Title	Original release date	U.S. viewers (millions)
174	1	"Gouls Just Wanna Have Fun"	April 4, 2018	1.39
175	2	"Running Your Mouth"	April 11, 2018	1.27
176	3	"Til Brunch Do Us Part"	April 18, 2018	1.34
177	4	"War and P.O.S."	April 25, 2018	1.43
178	5	"Tea for Tat"	May 2, 2018	1.37
179	6	"Grief and Relief"	May 9, 2018	1.44
180	7	"On an Island"	May 16, 2018	1.41
181	8	"A Frittered Friendship"	May 23, 2018	1.23
182	9	"Holidazed and Confused"	May 30, 2018	1.45
183	10	"You Broke the Penal Code"	June 6, 2018	1.39
184	11	"Faux Weddings and a Funeral"	June 13, 2018	1.40
185	12	"Every Mayflower Has Its Thorn"	June 20, 2018	1.37
186	13	"Arrest and Relaxation"	June 27, 2018	1.38
187	14	"Dating Wishes and Cabaret Dreams"	July 11, 2018	1.31
188	15	"Wigging Out"	July 18, 2018	1.36
189	16	"Guess Who's Arguing at Dinner?"	July 25, 2018	1.48
190	17	"Ship Happens"	August 1, 2018	1.50
191	18	"There's No Place Like Home"	August 8, 2018	1.37
192	19	"Life Is a Cabaret"	August 15, 2018	1.24
193	20	"Reunion Part 1"	August 22, 2018	1.27
194	21	"Reunion Part 2"	August 29, 2018	1.39
195	22	"Reunion Part 3"	September 5, 2018	1.26

=== Season 11 (2019) ===
Radziwill departed as a series regular. Barbara Kavovit served in a recurring capacity.

The Real Housewives of New York City season 11 episodes
No. overall	No. in season	Title	Original release date	U.S. viewers (millions)
196	1	"Divided, They Summer"	March 6, 2019	1.54
197	2	"Things Are Going Southampton"	March 13, 2019	1.38
198	3	"It's a Clam Shame"	March 20, 2019	1.27
199	4	"Making Up Is Hard to Do"	March 27, 2019	1.27
200	5	"Shark Bait"	April 3, 2019	1.35
201	6	"Sleeping With the Fishes"	April 10, 2019	1.39
202	7	"It's Kind of a Phone-y Story"	April 17, 2019	1.17
203	8	"Birds, Broads and Breakups"	April 24, 2019	1.16
204	9	"Tears of a Clown"	May 1, 2019	1.13
205	10	"Shalloween"	May 8, 2019	1.12
206	11	"Upstate Girls"	May 15, 2019	1.30
207	12	"Luann Land"	May 22, 2019	1.22
208	13	"It's Not You, It's Miami"	May 29, 2019	1.35
209	14	"Caught Between an Ex and a Hard Place"	June 5, 2019	1.36
210	15	"Life Is Not a Cabaret"	June 12, 2019	1.43
211	16	"More than a Feelin'"	June 20, 2019	1.38
212	17	"Jesus, the Countess and Joseph"	June 27, 2019	1.27
213	18	"Reunion Part 1"	July 11, 2019	1.29
214	19	"Reunion Part 2"	July 18, 2019	1.09
215	20	"Reunion Part 3"	July 25, 2019	1.21

=== Season 12 (2020) ===
Frankel departed as a series regular. Mortimer departed as a series regular after episode 11. Leah McSweeney joined the cast. Elyse Slaine served in a recurring capacity.

The Real Housewives of New York City season 12 episodes
No. overall	No. in season	Title	Original release date	U.S. viewers (millions)
216	1	"Back in the NY Groove"	April 2, 2020	1.09
217	2	"Stooping to a Lower Level"	April 9, 2020	1.03
218	3	"Don't Mansion It"	April 16, 2020	1.17
219	4	"Ain't No Party Like a Hamptons Party"	April 23, 2020	1.25
220	5	"Not So Model Behavior"	April 30, 2020	1.22
221	6	"Just the Sip"	May 7, 2020	1.18
222	7	"How Ya Like Them Apples?"	May 14, 2020	1.27
223	8	"If You Can't Take the Heat, Get Out of the Russian Bath House"	May 21, 2020	1.14
224	9	"Hurricane Leah"	May 28, 2020	1.33
225	10	"Something's Brewing"	June 4, 2020	1.18
226	11	"Love Him and Leave Them"	June 11, 2020	1.18
227	12	"Eat, Drink and Be Scary"	July 2, 2020	0.88
228	13	"Not Feeling Jovani"	July 9, 2020	1.11
229	14	"Remember Your Blue Stone Manners"	July 16, 2020	1.11
230	15	"Sheer Madness"	July 23, 2020	1.12
231	16	"Not Very Merry-achi"	July 30, 2020	1.18
232	17	"Back on the Hump"	August 6, 2020	1.16
233	18	"Hitting All the Wrong Cenotes"	August 13, 2020	1.22
234	19	"21st Century Sonja"	August 20, 2020	1.06
235	20	"No Party Like a Mob Party"	August 27, 2020	1.12
236	21	"Viva la Dysfunction"	September 3, 2020	1.12
237	22	"Reunion Part 1"	September 10, 2020	1.13
238	23	"Reunion Part 2"	September 17, 2020	1.02
239	24	"Reunion Part 3"	September 24, 2020	1.00
240	25	"Secrets Revealed"	October 1, 2020	0.50

=== Season 13 (2021) ===
Medley departed as a series regular. Eboni K. Williams joined the cast. Thomson and Bershan Shaw served in recurring capacities.

The Real Housewives of New York City season 13 episodes
No. overall	No. in season	Title	Original release date	U.S. viewers (millions)
241	1	"Back in the Big Apple"	May 4, 2021	0.96
242	2	"Burning Up"	May 11, 2021	0.87
243	3	"A High Rate of Interest"	May 18, 2021	0.82
244	4	"Putting the Tiff in Tiffany's"	May 25, 2021	0.84
245	5	"How Nude"	June 1, 2021	0.88
246	6	"Stop and Throw the Roses"	June 8, 2021	0.88
247	7	"Electile Dysfunction"	June 15, 2021	0.87
248	8	"A Harlem Night"	June 29, 2021	0.76
249	9	"The Salem B... Trials"	July 6, 2021	0.86
250	10	"Light as a Feather, Stiff as a Bored"	July 13, 2021	0.72
251	11	"The Witching Hour"	July 20, 2021	0.88
252	12	"Baby It’s Cold Inside"	July 27, 2021	0.81
253	13	"Ho Ho Holidays"	August 3, 2021	0.82
254	14	"Hanger Pains"	August 10, 2021	0.81
255	15	"B...ing and Ramoaning"	August 17, 2021	0.83
256	16	"Be Mine, Galentine"	August 24, 2021	0.75
257	17	"The Doppelgang's All Here"	August 31, 2021	0.84
258	18	"So...That Happened"	September 7, 2021	0.54

=== Season 14 (2023) ===
de Lesseps, Singer, Morgan, McSweeney and Williams departed as series regulars. Sai De Silva, Ubah Hassan, Erin Lichy, Jenna Lyons, Jessel Taank and Brynn Whitfield are introduced as new series regulars.

The Real Housewives of New York City season 14 episodes
No. overall	No. in season	Title	Original release date	U.S. viewers (millions)
259	1	"New Era, New York"	July 16, 2023	0.67
260	2	"Oh Christmas Tree!"	July 23, 2023	0.51
261	3	"Two Truths and No Shakshuka"	July 30, 2023	0.45
262	4	"The Most Brynnteresting Girl in the Room"	August 6, 2023	0.47
263	5	"Fashionably Absent"	August 13, 2023	0.44
264	6	"Anniversorry, Not Sorry"	August 20, 2023	0.56
265	7	"You Wreath What You Sow"	August 27, 2023	0.52
266	8	"Business Classy"	September 3, 2023	0.46
267	9	"Nothing Vanilla About Anguilla"	September 10, 2023	0.55
268	10	"Naughty-ical by Nature"	September 17, 2023	0.48 (Note: Season 14, Episode 10 was erroneously listed as a rerun by Nielsen and thus appeared on a rerun ratings chart.)
269	11	"The Case of the Missing Phone"	September 24, 2023	0.50
270	12	"Well Healed"	October 1, 2023	0.46
271	13	"A Night at Swingers"	October 8, 2023	0.42
272	14	"Connecticut-ing the Dots"	October 15, 2023	0.52
273	15	"Reunion Part 1"	October 22, 2023	0.54
274	16	"Reunion Part 2"	October 29, 2023	0.54

=== Season 15 (2024–2025) ===
Racquel Chevremont joined the cast. Rebecca Minkoff served in a recurring capacity.

The Real Housewives of New York City season 15 episodes
No. overall	No. in season	Title	Original release date	U.S. viewers (millions)
275	1	"Apple of My Lie"	October 1, 2024	0.31
276	2	"You Can Run But You Can't Ride"	October 8, 2024	0.35
277	3	"Dramamine Drama"	October 15, 2024	0.32
278	4	"Match Point of No Return"	October 22, 2024	0.36
279	5	"Without a Clue"	October 29, 2024	0.32
280	6	"A Shot of Mess-cal"	November 5, 2024	0.28
281	7	"Dodging Rumors"	November 12, 2024	0.36
282	8	"Birds of a Feather Gossip Together"	November 19, 2024	0.41
283	9	"Coming Clean"	November 26, 2024	0.38
284	10	"A Strictly Ballroom Affair"	December 3, 2024	0.38
285	11	"Resorting to Madness"	December 10, 2024	0.39
286	12	"A Tantrum and a Truce"	December 17, 2024	0.39
287	13	"Dinner Disasters and Breakfast Breakdowns"	January 7, 2025	0.47
288	14	"Quit Your Beachin"	January 14, 2025	0.48
289	15	"Paradise Lost"	January 21, 2025	0.51
290	16	"Reunion Part 1"	January 28, 2025	0.52
291	17	"Reunion Part 2"	February 4, 2025	0.51

=== Season 16 (2026) ===
Hassan, Lyons, Whitfield, and Chevremont departed as series regulars. Radziwill rejoined the cast as a series regular. Hailey Glassman, Erika Hammond and Daisy Toye joined the cast. Devyn Simone served in a recurring capacity.

The Real Housewives of New York City season 16 episodes
No. overall	No. in season	Title	Original release date
292	1	"The Price of Perfection"	September 8, 2026
293	2	"Much Ado About Brunching"	September 15, 2026
294	3	"A Seder in Brooklyn"	September 22, 2026
295	4	"Gloves Off at the Gala"	September 29, 2026
296	5	"Trouble in Paradise"	October 6, 2026
297	6	"Moskito Madness"	October 13, 2026
298	7	"Loveless Island"	October 20, 2026
299	8	"Havana Fights"	October 27, 2026
300	9	"All Bark, No Invite"	November 3, 2026
301	10	"Joke's on You"	November 10, 2026
302	11	"Peeling Back the Layers"	November 17, 2026
303	12	TBA	December 1, 2026
304	13	TBA	December 8, 2026
305	14	TBA	December 15, 2026
