= The Real Housewives of New York City season 9 =

Ninth season of the reality television series The Real Housewives of New York City

The Real Housewives of New York City
- Season 9
- Cover used by the iTunes Store; Clockwise: Singer, Medley, Morgan, Radziwill, Frankel, Mortimer, and D'Agostino
- Starring: Luann D'Agostino; Bethenny Frankel; Ramona Singer; Sonja Morgan; Carole Radziwill; Dorinda Medley; Tinsley Mortimer
- No. of episodes: 22

Release
- Original network: Bravo
- Original release: April 5 – August 30, 2017

Season chronology
- ← Previous; Season 8 Next → Season 10

The ninth season of The Real Housewives of New York City, an American reality television series, is broadcast on Bravo. It premiered on April 5, 2017, and was primarily filmed in New York City, New York. Its executive producers are Andrew Hoegl, Barrie Bernstein, Lisa Shannon, Pam Healy and Andy Cohen. The season focuses on the lives of Bethenny Frankel, Luann D'Agostino, Ramona Singer, Sonja Morgan, Carole Radziwill, Dorinda Medley and newcomer Tinsley Mortimer.

== Cast ==
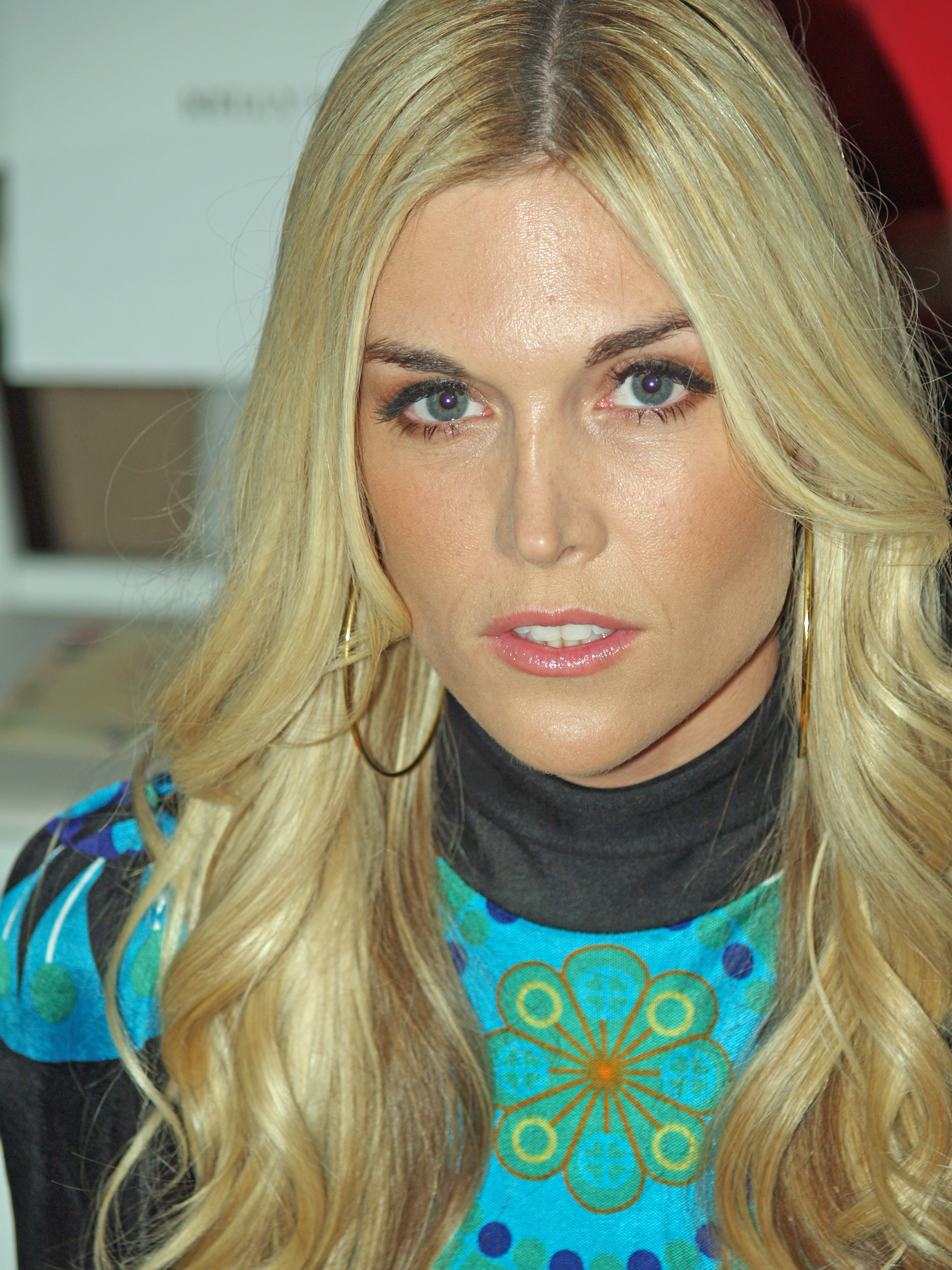
Season nine addition Tinsley Mortimer

Jules Wainstein departed the cast after one season. She was replaced by Tinsley Mortimer.

== Episodes ==
The Real Housewives of New York City season 9 episodes
No. overall	No. in season	Title	Original release date	U.S. viewers (millions)
152	1	"Talk of the Town"	April 5, 2017	1.27
Luann catches Dorinda up on how her wedding plans are unfolding. Dorinda complains about Sonja's persistent bad mouthing of her. Bethenny and her realtor friend Fredrik get to work to sell the apartment she got back in the divorce. Carole has made some changes to her living situation. Luann confronts Ramona about Tom.
153	2	"It Girl, Interrupted"	April 12, 2017	1.29
Tinsley Mortimer has just moved back to the city and is the latest boarder in Sonja's townhouse. Bethenny invites Carole and Ramona over to discuss life, politics and Sonja's new roommate. Ramona fills Dorinda in on the dirt she has about Tom. Sonja throws a tea party to introduce everyone, except Dorinda, to Tinsley.
154	3	"A New Low"	April 19, 2017	1.38
The ladies head to the Hamptons. Carole is staying at Bethenny's and the only thing she can talk about is the election. Dorinda prepares to see Sonja for the first time since learning about the gossip she has been spreading about her. Ramona takes the wrong approach with Bethenny when asking about her film role from 20 years ago.
155	4	"The Etiquette of Friendship"	April 26, 2017	1.43
Ramona's dinner party continues and Dorinda confronts Sonja about her incessant trash talking. Carole disinvites Ramona from her Election Night party because she doesn't believe Ramona is taking the presidential election seriously enough. Tinsley gets drinks with Luann and Dorinda, but leaves out Sonja.
156	5	"The Politics of Friendship"	May 3, 2017	1.36
Carole and her mom go canvassing in Pennsylvania, and later Carole and her friends watch the results come in while at her party. Sonja is conflicted between "Frenchie" and Rocco. Dorinda conspires to get Ramona to a surprise party she's throwing for her, but Ramona unknowingly throws a wrench in the plans.
157	6	"Wishful Invitation"	May 10, 2017	1.31
Carole attends the memorial service Dorinda has for her husband who died five years ago. Bethenny considers upgrading to a larger apartment. Tensions between Sonja and Tinsley are on the rise. Dorinda and the other bridesmaids get a sneak peek at Luann's wedding dress. Ramona questions Luann about not being invited to her wedding and then decides to confront Bethenny yet again.
158	7	"Bidding on Love"	May 17, 2017	1.33
Bethenny lets Dorinda know all about her new apartment. Ramona gets advice from her daughter about her situation with Bethenny. Tinsley, Ramona and Sonja hit the Upper East Side for a night out. Tinsley has to answer to Sonja when she meets a young suitor who does not meet all the qualifications on her list. Bethenny meets Luann's fiancé for the first time and Carole gets info that there may be trouble in paradise.
159	8	"Return of the Berserkshires"	May 24, 2017	1.25
Bethenny meets with Fredrik Eklund to discuss selling the Mercer apartment. Ramona shows Carole a text she received from a friend regarding Luann's fiancé. Tinsley's mom is in town for a visit. Dorinda continues her tradition of having the ladies up to her Berkshire home. Before Luann arrives a few of the women make Dorinda aware of new rumors about Tom and they decide an intervention is needed.
160	9	"Two Weeks Notice"	May 31, 2017	1.61
The ladies join Dorinda in telling Luann what they've been hearing about Tom. Bethenny urges Luann to get out now if she has doubts. Ramona's weird behavior at dinner throws everyone off. The conflict between Bethenny and Ramona reaches new heights.
161	10	"Black Out and Get Out"	June 7, 2017	1.61
Bethenny and Ramona's fight reaches an explosive level. Carole shows Tinsley an available apartment. Luann and Tom host a final pre-wedding lunch with Dorinda and old friends, Jill Zarin and her husband Bobby. Carole serves as model and host of an art opening. Luann and Tom head to Palm Beach.
162	11	"A Countess No More"	June 14, 2017	1.69
Bethenny hosts her annual holiday party, but Ramona's not invited. Ramona gets advice on her situation with Bethenny from her daughter. Luann and Tom get married. Tinsley learns that "Frenchie" has moved into Sonja's townhouse. Luann and Tom host a NYC reception for the friends not invited to the wedding.
163	12	"Regency Reunion"	June 21, 2017	1.59
Sonja's love triangle gets more complicated. Tinsley goes apartment hunting. Carole and Adam bicker over items he left behind in her apartment. Fredrik and Bethenny look over her apartment as they plan to put it on the market. Carole and Dorinda go to Washington DC. Ramona throws a party at her apartment.
164	13	"A Bronx Tale"	June 28, 2017	1.45
Dorinda fights with Sonja while the ladies lunch in the Bronx. Tinsley breaks down. Despite the tension between Ramona and Bethenny, all of the ladies head to Vermont. Tinsley feels ganged up on when the group discusses her current life decisions.
165	14	"A Slippery Slope"	July 5, 2017	1.63
Sonja digs a deeper grave for herself. While the ladies hit the slopes, a big news story about Bethenny breaks. Bethenny is on the fence about inviting Ramona to Mexico. The ladies play a revealing game of "Truth or Dare" and Dorinda ends up attacking Luann.
166	15	"Oil and Vinegar"	July 12, 2017	1.55
Back in the city, Bethenny fine tunes the upcoming trip to Mexico. Carole has her day in court while Sonja gets an intimate cosmetic treatment. At a dinner thrown by Dorinda, Bethenny is forced to face Ramona and the Mexico invite situation. Tinsley practices her flirting on a blind date set up by Carole.
167	16	"Three Tequila… Floor!"	July 19, 2017	1.70
The ladies arrive in Mexico and Ramona and Sonja scramble for the best room, swiftly alienating themselves from the group. Tinsley confronts Ramona and Sonja about a damaging article. Luann takes a tumble. Bethenny reprimands Sonja.
168	17	"Tequila-thon"	July 26, 2017	1.78
It’s a new day in Mexico and the drama continues as Bethenny confronts Ramona about attending the Tequila trip. Tinsley readdresses the press article with Sonja, while some of the other ladies try their hand at surfing. The ladies all go shopping together and Ramona tries to buy her way back into Bethenny’s good graces. Tinsley and Sonja’s tension resurfaces at dinner. Bethenny takes the ladies on an educational day-drinking trip to the agave fields in Tequila. The ladies ride the drunk train back to the villa where Sonja puts Ramona in the hot seat.
169	18	"Make Out, Make Up"	August 2, 2017	1.64
Fresh off of their day trip to Tequila, the ladies drink up and strip down back at the villa. Sonja spreads the love to all the ladies while Bethenny and Ramona have a nude detente in the pool. Dorinda and Bethenny get into a fight that leads to knives flying. Some of the ladies split off for a day of fishing and whale watching. At their final dinner Luann flubs the rules of a game.
170	19	"Thank You and Good Night"	August 9, 2017	1.72
Tinsley has Carole over to see her new digs. Luann and Tom challenge each other during a game of tennis. Bethenny deals with the stresses of renovating a new apartment, but finds distraction with a hot, new fling. Dorinda has John over for a romantic dinner, while Sonja and Frenchie talk about their upcoming trip together. Tinsley throws a party for Sonja.
171	20	"Reunion Part 1"	August 16, 2017	1.62
The ladies put it all out on the table. Dorinda and Sonja hash out their early season issues. Luann faces more allegations about Tom and continues to defend her marriage. The Bethenny and Ramona battle takes another turn as Bethenny questions Ramona's attitude toward others and the housewives speculate on Ramona's behavior.
172	21	"Reunion Part 2"	August 23, 2017	1.39
Tinsley opens up about her re-entry into NYC life and reveals some big news. Carole reflects on the election and the status of her relationship, while Sonja discusses her personal love triangle, which elicits a shocking accusation about her French lover. Bethenny gets emotional talking about her personal life.
173	22	"Reunion Part 3"	August 30, 2017	1.47
The housewives look back on their trip to Mexico. Tinsley and Sonja attempt to clear the air and salvage their friendship. However, the reunion takes a turn when Bethenny questions the sincerity of Ramona's apology. Ramona is forced to address the accusations she made against Bethenny.
