= Alexandra McCord =

American television personality

Alex McCord
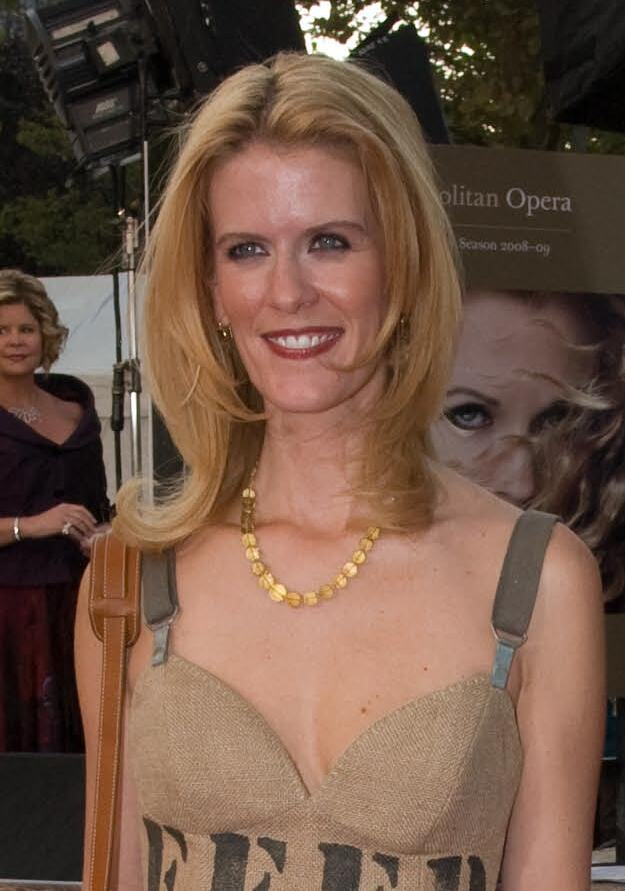
- McCord in 2008
- Born: Sara Alexandra McCord; October 1, 1973 (age 53); Washington, D.C., U.S.
- Education: Northwestern University (attended); City University of New York (BA); University of New England (MProfPsych, PhD)
- Occupations: Actress; author; model; psychologist; television personality; voice actress
- Years active: 1996–present
- Television: The Real Housewives of New York City
- Spouse: Simon van Kempen (m. 2000)
- Children: 2

Sara Alexandra McCord, also known as Alex McCord, is an American television personality, psychologist and former actress who is best known for her role on The Real Housewives of New York City from seasons 1 to 4.

== Early life ==
McCord was born in Washington, D.C., to parents both from Texas. She was partly raised in Texas and in the United States Virgin Islands before settling in Fort Scott, Kansas. She graduated from Fort Scott High School in 1991.

== Career ==
McCord co-starred in the first four seasons of The Real Housewives of New York City (RHONY) alongside her husband and children. She also shared glimpses of her career in modeling and graphic design, opening up about the challenges of being a working mother in a book co-written with her husband, Little Kids, Big City. A few years after their final appearance on the show, the McCords moved to Australia, the native country of her husband.

== Education ==
McCord attended Northwestern University in Evanston, Illinois, from 1991 to 1994. She then attended the City University of New York, where she studied psychology and earned a Bachelor of Arts degree. In 2020, McCord graduated from the University of New England in Armidale, New South Wales, with a master's degree in professional psychology. She graduated with a PhD in clinical psychology from the University of New England in 2026.

== Personal life ==
McCord married Simon van Kempen in 2000 and they have two sons together, Francois and Johan. During their time on RHONY, they lived in Brooklyn, New York, in the Boerum Hill neighborhood. The couple met in 1999.

== Selected filmography ==
- Agent Aika (1996–1997); voice, 7 episodes
- Birdy the Mighty (1996–1997); voice, 4 episodes
- Alphabet Garden (1997)
- One Life to Live (1999–2002); 8 episodes
- Kate & Leopold (2001)
- Uptown Girls (2003)
- Cyberchase (2004); voice, 1 episode
- The Tollbooth (2004)
- The Great New Wonderful (2005)
- Queen of Beasts (2005)
- Rape. (2006)
- The Architect (2006)
- The Warrior Class (2007)
- Manhattanites (2008)

== Selected bibliography ==
- McCord, Alex; Van Kempen, Simon (2010). Little Kids, Big City: Tales from a Real House in New York City (With Lessons on Life and Love for Your Own Concrete Jungle). Sterling & Ross Publishers.
