= The Real Housewives Ultimate Girls Trip season 4 =

Season of television series

The Real Housewives Ultimate Girls Trip: RHONY Legacy
- Season 4
- Cover used by Peacock
- Starring: Luann de Lesseps; Ramona Singer; Dorinda Medley; Kelly Killoren Bensimon; Sonja Morgan; Kristen Taekman
- No. of episodes: 6

Release
- Original network: Peacock
- Original release: December 14, 2023 – January 4, 2024

Season chronology
- ← Previous; Season 3 Next → Season 5

The fourth season of The Real Housewives Ultimate Girls Trip premiered on Peacock on December 14, 2023. The season was filmed in Saint Barthélemy. Its executive producers are Lisa Shannon, Dan Peirson, Darren Ward, Glenda Cox, and Andy Cohen.

The season follows former housewives from The Real Housewives of New York City vacationing together. The fourth season cast was composed of: Luann de Lesseps, Ramona Singer, Dorinda Medley, Kelly Killoren Bensimon, Sonja Morgan and Kristen Taekman.

== Production ==
The fourth season was filmed in June 2023 in Saint Barthélemy. The season was originally slated to be the fifth season of The Real Housewives Ultimate Girls Trip, but was ultimately switched due to Caroline Manzo from The Real Housewives of New Jersey accusing Brandi Glanville from The Real Housewives of Beverly Hills of sexual assault during the filming of The Real Housewives Ultimate Girls Trip: Ex-Wives Club 2 in Morocco, which occurred in January 2023.

== Cast ==
In June 2023, the cast for the fourth season of The Real Housewives Ultimate Girls Trip was officially announced. This season featured former Housewives stars from The Real Housewives of New York City: Luann de Lesseps, Ramona Singer, Dorinda Medley, Kelly Killoren Bensimon, Sonja Morgan and Kristen Taekman.

Cast of Ultimate Girls Trip 4
Cast member	Franchise	Seasons
Luann de Lesseps	New York City	1–5; 7–13
Ramona Singer	New York City	1–13
Dorinda Medley	New York City	7–12
Kelly Killoren Bensimon	New York City	2–4
Sonja Morgan	New York City	3–13
Kristen Taekman	New York City	6–7

== Episodes ==
The Real Housewives Ultimate Girls Trip season 4 episodes
No. overall	No. in season	Title	Original release date
22	1	"Vive Legacy"	December 14, 2023
23	2	"The Pirate Part Deux"	December 14, 2023
24	3	"Take Me Out to the Hockey Game"	December 14, 2023
25	4	"A Yacht of Attention"	December 21, 2023
26	5	"RHONY Relics"	December 28, 2023
27	6	"(Going) Out with a Bang"	January 4, 2024
