= The Real Housewives Ultimate Girls Trip season 2 =

Season of television series

The Real Housewives Ultimate Girls Trip: Ex-Wives Club
- Season 2
- Cover used by Peacock
- Starring: Taylor Armstrong; Brandi Glanville; Vicki Gunvalson; Tamra Judge; Eva Marcille; Dorinda Medley; Phaedra Parks; Jill Zarin
- No. of episodes: 7

Release
- Original network: Peacock
- Original release: June 23 – July 21, 2022

Season chronology
- ← Previous; Season 1 Next → Season 3

The second season of The Real Housewives Ultimate Girls Trip premiered on Peacock on June 23, 2022. The season was primarily filmed in Great Barrington, Massachusetts, a town in the Berkshires region, at Dorinda Medley's Blue Stone Manor. Its executive producers are Lisa Shannon, Dan Peirson, Darren Ward, John Paparazzo, Glenda Cox and Andy Cohen.

The season follows several housewives from across The Real Housewives franchise vacationing together. The second cast was composed of Taylor Armstrong, Brandi Glanville, Vicki Gunvalson, Tamra Judge, Eva Marcille, Dorinda Medley, Phaedra Parks and Jill Zarin.

== Production ==
The second season was filmed in September 2021 at Dorinda Medley's Blue Stone Manor located in Great Barrington, Massachusetts.

== Cast ==
In March, the series was officially announced as The Real Housewives Ultimate Girls Trip: Ex-Wives Club, the second season features former Housewives stars who are no longer cast-members on their original series. The cast consists of: Taylor Armstrong, Brandi Glanville, Vicki Gunvalson, Tamra Judge, Eva Marcille, Dorinda Medley, Phaedra Parks and Jill Zarin. The second season premiered on June 23, 2022.

Cast of Ultimate Girls Trip 2
Cast member	Franchise	Seasons
Taylor Armstrong	Beverly Hills	1–3
Brandi Glanville	Beverly Hills	3–5
Vicki Gunvalson	Orange County	1–13, 20-
Tamra Judge	Orange County	3–14, 17–
Eva Marcille	Atlanta	11–12
Dorinda Medley	New York City	7–12
Phaedra Parks	Atlanta	3–9, 16–
Jill Zarin	New York City	1–4

== Episodes ==
The Real Housewives Ultimate Girls Trip season 2 episodes
No. overall	No. in season	Title	Original release date
8	1	"Return to Blue Stone Manor"	June 23, 2022
9	2	"There's a Jill in the Air"	June 23, 2022
10	3	"Dazed and Excused"	June 23, 2022
11	4	"Speakeasy and Act Tough"	June 30, 2022
12	5	"The Ultimate Thirst"	July 7, 2022
13	6	"Tis the Season?"	July 14, 2022
14	7	"Leavin' on a Prayer"	July 21, 2022
