= The Real Housewives Ultimate Girls Trip season 1 =

Season of television series

The Real Housewives Ultimate Girls Trip
- Season 1
- Cover used by Peacock
- Starring: Cynthia Bailey; Teresa Giudice; Melissa Gorga; Luann de Lesseps; Kenya Moore; Kyle Richards; Ramona Singer
- No. of episodes: 7

Release
- Original network: Peacock
- Original release: November 16 – December 9, 2021

Season chronology
- Next → Season 2

The first season of The Real Housewives Ultimate Girls Trip premiered on Peacock on December 16, 2021. The season was primarily filmed in the Turks and Caicos Islands. Its executive producers are Lisa Shannon, Dan Peirson, Darren Ward, John Paparazzo, Glenda Cox and Andy Cohen.

The season follows several housewives from across The Real Housewives franchise vacationing together. The cast was composed of Cynthia Bailey, Teresa Giudice, Melissa Gorga, Luann de Lesseps, Kenya Moore, Kyle Richards and Ramona Singer.

== Production ==
The season was filmed at the Triton Luxury Villa in Turks and Caicos Islands with its Principal photography beginning in April 2021.

== Cast ==
The cast includes: Cynthia Bailey, Luann de Lesseps, Teresa Giudice, Melissa Gorga, Kenya Moore, Kyle Richards and Ramona Singer. Vicki Gunvalson and Gizelle Bryant both stated they were initially cast for the first season, but were unable to commit to the project due to the COVID-19 pandemic. The first season premiered on November 16, 2021.

Cast of Ultimate Girls Trip 1
Cast member	Franchise	Seasons
Cynthia Bailey	Atlanta	3–13
Teresa Giudice	New Jersey	1–
Melissa Gorga	New Jersey	3–
Luann de Lesseps	New York City	1–5, 7–13
Kenya Moore	Atlanta	5–10, 12–15
Kyle Richards	Beverly Hills	1–
Ramona Singer	New York City	1–13

== Episodes ==
The Real Housewives Ultimate Girls Trip season 1 episodes
No. overall	No. in season	Title	Original release date
1	1	"When Wives Collide"	November 16, 2021
2	2	"Days of Our Wives"	November 16, 2021
3	3	"Girl(friend) Interrupted"	November 16, 2021
4	4	"Fourth Wall Down"	November 18, 2021
5	5	"Stormy Waters"	November 25, 2021
6	6	"Bonfire of the Frenemies"	December 2, 2021
7	7	"Go Big Before You Go Home"	December 9, 2021
