= Gay for Play Game Show Starring RuPaul =

- Genre: Game show
- Presented by: RuPaul
- Country of origin: United States
- Original language: English
- No. of seasons: 2
- No. of episodes: 12

Production
- Executive producers: Fenton Bailey; Randy Barbato; Tom Campbell; Kate Fisher; RuPaul Charles; Chris McCarthy; Pamela Post; Tim Palazzola
- Running time: 22 minutes
- Production company: World of Wonder Productions

Original release
- Network: Logo
- Release: April 11, 2016 – July 13, 2017

Gay for Play Game Show Starring RuPaul is an American game show that premiered on the Logo cable network, on April 11, 2016 and ended on July 13, 2017. The trivia-based game show, hosted by RuPaul, featured contestants who answer questions related to pop culture with an option of asking the celebrity panel for help. The panel includes Michelle Visage, Todrick Hall, Carson Kressley, and Ross Mathews, as well as a rotating panel of former contestants of RuPaul's Drag Race and various other celebrities.

== Development ==
On January 21, 2016, Gay for Play Game Show Starring RuPaul was greenlit by Logo, which described the series as a "celebrity-filled pop culture trivia show." The trailer for the series was revealed on March 3, 2016. The trailer featured footage of many celebrity guests, although several of them were not featured on the first 6 episodes. The series premiered on April 11, 2016. On May 26, 2016, it was announced that Gay for Play Game Show Starring RuPaul would return with more episodes, and a second season of 6 episodes began airing on June 29, 2017.

== Episodes ==
Season	Episodes	Originally released	
Season	Episodes	First released	Last released
1	6	April 11, 2016	May 16, 2016
2	6	June 29, 2017	July 13, 2017

=== Season 1 (2016) ===
No. overall	No. in season	Title	Original release date	US viewers (millions)
1	1	"Featuring Rebecca Romijn"	April 11, 2016	0.183
Rebecca Romijn and Jerry O'Connell battle for prizes for a home viewer with the help of Michelle Visage, Carson Kressley, Todrick Hall, Jeannie Mai, Manila Luzon and Ts Madison. Kingsley and Kim Chi make an appearance to ask a video question each.
2	2	"Featuring Amber Rose"	April 12, 2016	N/A
Two contestants battle for prizes with the help of Michelle Visage, Carson Kressley, Todrick Hall, Ross Mathews, Katya and Amber Rose. Derrick Barry and Kingsley make an appearance to ask a video question each.
3	3	"Featuring Kristen Johnston"	April 18, 2016	0.170
Two contestants battle for prizes battle with the help of Michelle Visage, Carson Kressley, Todrick Hall, Ross Mathews, Jinkx Monsoon and Kristen Johnston. Kyle Krieger and Tempest DuJour make an appearance to ask a video question each.
4	4	"Featuring the Cast of 227"	April 25, 2016	0.166
Two former cast members of 227, Marla Gibbs and Jackée Harry battle for prizes for a home viewer with the help of Michelle Visage, Carson Kressley, Todrick Hall, Kym Whitley, Alyssa Edwards and Heather McDonald. Naomi Smalls and Kyle Krieger make an appearance to ask a video question each.
5	5	"Featuring Mindy Cohn"	May 2, 2016	0.115
Two contestants battle for prizes with the help of Michelle Visage, Carson Kressley, Todrick Hall, Mindy Cohn, Trixie Mattel and Daniel Franzese. Connor Franta and Kelly Mantle make an appearance to ask a video question each.
6	6	"Featuring Jeannie Mai"	May 16, 2016	N/A
Two contestants battle for prizes with the help of Michelle Visage, Carson Kressley, Todrick Hall, Ross Mathews, Raven and Jeannie Mai. James St. James and Kennedy Davenport make an appearance to ask a video question each.

=== Season 2 (2017) ===
No. overall	No. in season	Title	Original release date	US viewers (millions)
7	1	"Featuring Kristen Johnston"	June 29, 2017	N/A
Two contestants battle for prizes with the help of Michelle Visage, Carson Kressley, Todrick Hall, Michelle Buteau, Detox and Kristen Johnston. Gia Gunn and Alaska make an appearance to ask a video question.
8	2	"Featuring Frankie Grande"	June 29, 2017	N/A
Two contestants battle for prizes with the help of Michelle Visage, Carson Kressley, Todrick Hall, Ross Mathews, Latrice Royale and Frankie Grande. Trixie Mattel, Austin and Aaron Rhodes make an appearance to ask a video question.
9	3	"Featuring Gretchen Rossi, Taylor Armstrong"	July 6, 2017	N/A
Gretchen Rossi and Taylor Armstrong battle for prizes with the help of Michelle Visage, Carson Kressley, Todrick Hall, Ross Mathews, Heather McDonald, and Raja. Naomi Smalls and GloZell make an appearance to ask a video question.
10	4	"Featuring Brandi Glanville"	July 6, 2017	N/A
Two contestants battle for prizes with the help of Michelle Visage, Carson Kressley, Todrick Hall, Ross Mathews, Delta Work, and Brandi Glanville. Alyssa Edwards, Austin and Aaron Rhodes make an appearance to ask a video question.
11	5	"Featuring Cheyenne Jackson"	July 13, 2017	N/A
Two contestants battle for prizes with the help of Michelle Visage, Carson Kressley, Todrick Hall, Ross Mathews, Chad Michaels, and Cheyenne Jackson. Connor Franta and Mrs. Kasha Davis make an appearance to ask a video question.
12	6	"Featuring Frankie Grande"	July 13, 2017	N/A
Two contestants battle for prizes with the help of Michelle Visage, Carson Kressley, Todrick Hall, Michelle Buteau, Alaska, and Frankie Grande. Joey Graceffa and Katya make an appearance to ask a video question.
