= The Real Housewives Ultimate Girls Trip season 3 =

Season of television series

The Real Housewives Ultimate Girls Trip: Thailand
- Season 3
- Cover used by Peacock
- Starring: Gizelle Bryant; Candiace Dillard Bassett; Leah McSweeney; Heather Gay; Whitney Rose; Porsha Williams; Alexia Nepola; Marysol Patton
- No. of episodes: 7

Release
- Original network: Peacock
- Original release: March 23 – April 20, 2023

Season chronology
- ← Previous; Season 2 Next → Season 4

The third season of The Real Housewives Ultimate Girls Trip premiered on Peacock on March 23, 2023. The season was filmed in Thailand. Its executive producers are Lisa Shannon, Dan Peirson, Darren Ward, Glenda Cox, and Andy Cohen.

The season follows several housewives from across The Real Housewives franchise vacationing together. The third cast was composed of: Gizelle Bryant, Candiace Dillard Bassett, Leah McSweeney, Heather Gay, Whitney Rose, Porsha Williams, Alexia Nepola, and Marysol Patton.

== Production ==
The third season was filmed in July 2022 in Thailand.

== Cast ==
In July 2022, the cast for the third season of The Real Housewives Ultimate Girls Trip was officially announced. This season featured: Gizelle Bryant and Candiace Dillard Bassett from The Real Housewives of Potomac, Leah McSweeney from The Real Housewives of New York City, Heather Gay and Whitney Rose from The Real Housewives of Salt Lake City, Alexia Nepola and Marysol Patton from The Real Housewives of Miami, and Porsha Williams from The Real Housewives of Atlanta, who replaced Tinsley Mortimer after Mortimer exited the show for personal reasons.

Cast of Ultimate Girls Trip 3
Cast member	Franchise	Seasons
Gizelle Bryant	Potomac	1–
Candiace Dillard Bassett	Potomac	3–8
Leah McSweeney	New York City	12–13
Heather Gay	Salt Lake City	1–
Whitney Rose	Salt Lake City	1–
Porsha Williams	Atlanta	5–6, 8–13, 16–
Alexia Nepola	Miami	1, 3–
Marysol Patton	Miami	1–2

== Episodes ==
The Real Housewives Ultimate Girls Trip season 3 episodes
No. overall	No. in season	Title	Original release date
15	1	"We're in Thailand, B*tches!"	March 23, 2023
16	2	"The Elephants in the Room"	March 23, 2023
17	3	"Don't Rock the Boat"	March 23, 2023
18	4	"Dangerous Games"	March 30, 2023
19	5	"Oh Bottle, Where Art Thou?"	April 6, 2023
20	6	"Tantric Tantrums"	April 13, 2023
21	7	"Phuket Me Not"	April 20, 2023
