= The Real Housewives of Beverly Hills season 3 =

The Real Housewives of Beverly Hills
- Season 3
- Cover used by iTunes (Left to right) Armstrong, Richards, Vanderpump, Maloof, Glanville, Foster, and Kyle
- Starring: Taylor Armstrong; Adrienne Maloof; Kim Richards; Kyle Richards; Lisa Vanderpump; Yolanda Foster; Brandi Glanville
- No. of episodes: 22

Release
- Original network: Bravo
- Original release: November 5, 2012 – April 8, 2013

Season chronology
- ← Previous; Season 2 Next → Season 4

The third season of The Real Housewives of Beverly Hills, an American reality television series, aired on Bravo from November 5, 2012 to April 8, 2013, and is primarily filmed in Beverly Hills, California.

The season focuses on the personal and professional lives of Taylor Armstrong, Adrienne Maloof, Kim Richards, Kyle Richards, Lisa Vanderpump, Yolanda Foster, and Brandi Glanville. The season consisted of 22 episodes.

This season marked the final regular appearances for original housewives Taylor Armstrong and Adrienne Maloof.

The season's executive producers are Andrew Hoegl, Barrie Bernstein, Lisa Shannon, Pam Healy and Andy Cohen.

== Production and crew ==
On May 2, 2012, the renewal of season three of The Real Housewives of Beverly Hills was revealed when Camille Grammer revealed that she would be returning to the series in some capacity. In September 2012, the full cast, trailer and premier date for season three were announced.

The season premiere "Down and Left Out in Beverly Hills" was aired on November 5, 2012, while the nineteenth episode "Finale" served as the season finale, and was aired on March 25, 2013. It was followed by a two-part reunion that aired on March 25 and April 1, 2013 and a "Secrets Revealed" episode on April 8, 2013, which marked the conclusion of the season. Alex Baskin, Chris Cullen, Douglas Ross, Greg Stewart, Toni Gallagher, Dave Rupel and Andy Cohen are recognized as the series' executive producers; it is produced and distributed by Evolution Media.

On January 7, 2013, the episode "Unsolved Mistresses" aired as a special two-hour episode to transition in to the premiere of the first spin-off to The Real Housewives of Beverly Hills titled Vanderpump Rules. Vanderpump Rules stars Lisa Vanderpump in the title role and her employees, Kristen Doute, Katie Maloney, Scheana Shay, Stassi Schroeder, Tom Sandoval and Jax Taylor. The series documents Vanderpump running her restaurant SUR while juggling her staff's drama among themselves. It also focuses on the staff's relationships and personal lives.

== Cast and synopsis ==
=== Cast ===
All six wives from season two returned for the third installment though Camille Grammer returned to the series in a recurring capacity, due to wanting to focus on her family as well as not wanting to "expose her personal life." Grammer claims she wasn't fired and the demotion was by her own choice saying, "I just chose to keep most things private in general. I'm in a good place, and I've had such an interesting experience and such a learning experience being on this show." Season two's recurring cast member Brandi Glanville returned for season three as a full-time cast member, marking the first time in The Real Housewives franchise someone had been promoted from a friend of the show to a full time housewife. Also a recurring cast member in season two, Dana Wilkey departed the series but continued to guest star in later seasons.

Season three introduced two new recurring cast members, Faye Resnick and Marissa Zanuck as well as a new full-time cast member, Yolanda Foster, who appears from the third episode on.

Resnick joined the series after appearing previously in the prior two seasons as a friend of Kyle Richards. Richards and Resnick have worked together and known each other for a long time with Resnick helping design Kyle and her nieces, Paris and Nicky Hilton's homes. Prior to meeting Kyle, Resnick was born in North Carolina, where she began her career as a model. Resnick moved to San Francisco, where she opened and ran her own modelling agency. In Los Angeles, Resnick had gained a lot of notoriety during the murder trial of her friend Nicole Brown Simpson who allegedly had been murdered by her ex-husband O. J. Simpson. During the trial, Resnick had a memoir published, Nicole Brown Simpson: The Private Diary of a Life Interrupted. With her newfound fame, she then later went on to pose for Playboy. In later years, Resnick had always been inspired by Europe and went on to get married in London and give birth to her daughter, Francesca. Resnick soon owned many homes across Europe and the United States and moved back to the U.S with a new sense of creativity and eye for design. Resnick stuck with her passion for design and has since designed many projects, including Fendi Casa LA, Color at Caesars Palace, Amp Salon at The Palms Hotel, and Dash Retail Boutique. Resnick has also designed homes for many celebrities, such as Avril Lavigne, Kevin Connolly, Vanessa and Nick Lachey, and Ike Bakrie's international residence in Indonesia.

Zanuck is also introduced as a friend of Kyle Richards, and the two met when Zanuck joined Hilton and Hyland real estate agency, where Kyle's husband Mauricio Umansky used to work. Zanuck is a Beverly Hills native and grew up having a fascination with high-end properties. Zanuck worked her way from the bottom to the top in the real estate business and, with determination, she earned her license to become an agent. Over two decades, Zanuck has worked in Beverly Hills, Sunset Plaza, Hollywood Hills and the Westside of Los Angeles, helping to buy and sell over a hundred homes. Zanuck is the wife of Dean Zanuck, the producer most notable for producing the feature films, Road to Perdition and Get Low. Zanuck's husband Dean is often regarded as Hollywood royalty as his father, and her father-in-law, was Richard Zanuck, an Academy Award winning producer of Driving Miss Daisy, who also produced Jaws, Cocoon, Sweeny Todd, Alice in Wonderland and Charlie and the Chocolate Factory. The family is also known for Dean's grandfather, Darryl Zanuck, being one of the founders of the studio Twentieth Century-Fox as well as winning three Academy Awards. When the couple isn't working, they're raising their son Jack, 10, and daughter Darryl, 7.

Foster was born and raised in Papendrecht, a small farming town in Holland, where she learned about hard work from taking part in the farming life by riding horses and milking cows. Her childhood was cut short by her father's death when she was seven, forcing her to grow up fast. Foster felt the need to support her family, her mother and brother, so at the age of 13, she found work as a dishwasher at a local Chinese restaurant. At the age of 16, Eileen Ford discovered Foster and from there she began her modeling career. Foster left Holland to pursue modelling, which allowed her to work and live in cities such as Paris, Milan, Hamburg, Sydney, Tokyo, and New York City. In the mid-nineties, Foster moved to Los Angeles and met Mohamed Hadid. The two later married and had three children together, Gigi, Bella and Anwar. The couple later divorced and in 2010, Foster became the fourth wife of 16-time Grammy Award-winning producer and songwriter David Foster. With her new marriage, Foster juggles the blended family of her own children plus five stepdaughters. Foster joined The Real Housewives of Beverly Hills which is her second experience in reality television after appearing on Nederlandse Hollywood Vrouwen (translated Dutch Hollywood Women), a series inspired by The Real Housewives franchise, in 2011.

=== Synopsis ===
The Real Housewives of Beverly Hills season three begins with the growth of the friendship between Lisa Vanderpump and Brandi Glanville. The two have been hanging out a lot more, and they have formed a close bond. With the growth of a new friendship, there's the end of another. The reunion of last season left a bad taste for Vanderpump and Adrienne Maloof. With accusations having been made between the two, the friendship has soured, and the two are left expecting apologies from one another, which leaves them not communicating. Kyle Richards and her sister Kim Richards continue to rebuild their relationship after Kim has gotten out of rehab for alcoholism. New wife, Yolanda Foster, shows off her huge home in Malibu which includes a glass fridge and her very own lemon orchard. Kim and her other sister, Kathy Hilton, help prepare for Kimberly, Kim's daughter's prom while their older sister Kyle and her daughter Portia are making phone calls to invite guests to Portia’s 4th birthday party (see below). Maloof meets up with Taylor Armstrong for a day trip of shopping due to Armstrong's recent weight gain of ten pounds. Vanderpump hosts an exclusive party for the anniversary of her restaurant, Villa Blanca, but doesn't invite Maloof, which leaves Maloof feeling like the odd one out. At the party, the Richards sisters question each other's behavior and wonder if things will ever be the same again after Portia called Kim 10 times with no answer; on the tenth, Portia said annoying while Lisa answered immediately.

Foster hosts a dinner party at her Malibu home with all the ladies invited. Foster's husband hosts an after-dinner sing-a-long, but Armstrong is annoyed that he won't allow the ladies to participate and later has issues with the choice of music. Foster finds Armstrong's behavior is rude and in poor taste. Foster still has a close relationship with her ex-husband, Mohamed, and decorates a home for him. Foster leaves the Las Vegas trip early; she doesn't understand the ladies' behavior and doesn't like the drama.

Maloof feels the ongoing tension from Vanderpump when Vanderpump leaves Portia's birthday shortly after Maloof's arrival. With the tension between the two, they agree to meet to discuss their issues after the awkwardness at Foster's Malibu house party, but Maloof is left feeling unsatisfied by the meeting. At Mauricio's business event, Maloof is informed by Kim that during Vanderpump's food tasting event, Glanville shared some very secret information about her. Maloof and her husband, Paul Nassif, are instantly outraged at Glanville, which results in a yelling match between the three, causing Kyle and Taylor to worry about their daughters, Portia and Kennedy's daily lives being leaked by Brandi, and while snack feeding, the moms ordered the little girls to only share information with themselves, their parents, and close friends that include siblings but not anyone else. At a Morocco themed restaurant, a bombshell is dropped when it's revealed that Maloof and her husband are suing Glanville over her comments on their private life. Maloof and her husband attend Sophia Umansky's elementary school graduation, but keep their distance from the group. At Vanderpump's tea party, Maloof insists she hasn't sued Glanville, and it was just a warning, and the two get into an argument about the truth. Maloof decides to evacuate her family from her home after Vanderpump's former home goes up in flames. The evacuation causes tension and a fight between Maloof and her husband when he insists on not leaving and staying behind. The two later form a united front at Kyle's annual white party, where they confront everyone's accusations about the lawsuit. Maloof throws an outrageous party for her new line on vodka. At the party, things between her and her husband worsen as she feels like he constantly seeks attention. News of their separation begins to circulate. On the eve of the news of her separation from Paul, Maloof arrives at Vanderpump's vow renewal in an emotional state. Maloof stays inside, tearful, and several ladies, excluding Vanderpump, come to her aid as she breaks down. Maloof didn't attend the reunion, and host Andy Cohen informed the viewers that her not attending was her last act as a housewife and that she would subsequently be let go from the series.

Glanville finds herself in a feud with Maloof after an intimate discussion with Kim Richards. Glanville and Kim begin to form a bond and discuss the past tension when Maloof comments on Kim's crying. Glanville begins swearing at Maloof to mind her own business. With Vanderpump's food tasting event coming up, Glanville is concerned that she may run into her ex-husband's former mistress, Scheana Shay, who is a waitress at the restaurant. At the food tasting event, Glanville reveals some secret information about Maloof that has been secret for years. During Kyle's dinner party, Glanville faces the repercussions of what she shared after Faye Resnick attempts to reprimand her for talking about people. Brandi insists on explaining herself, but Resnick doesn't want to hear what she has to say, resulting in Glanville leaving in tears. Glanville meets with Shay, at Vanderpump's request, to get out her feelings of the years of pain. They discuss the fact that Shay had ruined her marriage and Glanville doesn't believe she has the right to feel sad. At a Moroccan themed restaurant, Glanville tells the other ladies that she is being sued by Maloof and her husband over her remarks on their secret. At an art gallery opening, Glanville invites the ladies for a trip to Las Vegas, later in Vegas Glanville wants to empower the women and invited them to take a pole-dancing class. During the tea party and Vanderpump's house, Glanville argues with Maloof after Maloof claims there is no lawsuit. Glanville reveals she has the letters to prove her wrong and that she has had to hire an attorney. Shortly after an argument Glanville can't handle the lies and leaves the party. In Paris, Kim and Glanville continue to form a bond. Glanville confront Zanuck on her talking behind Glanville's back. During the confrontation, Glanville nemesis Resnick jumps in causing more trouble.

Vanderpump has moved into a new home called Villa Rosa. Vanderpump finds herself being questioned by the ladies in Ojai, after defending Glanville's colorful language. Vanderpump decides to host a food tasting event at her restaurant, SUR, which causing concern for Glanville. Vanderpump also has concerns of her own with her husband going into surgery. Kyle's dinner party after a confrontation between Resnick and Glanville, Vanderpump once again finds herself being question by the ladies for defending Glanville. While in Las Vegas during a discussion about Maloof, Vanderpump finds herself in an argument with Camille Grammer with Grammer saying Vanderpump doesn't own her restaurant. Kyle visits Vanderpump at her home to discuss their mutual hurt, Vanderpump tells Kyle that she doesn't feel Kyle stands up for her. After arriving in Paris, Vanderpump and her husband take a side trip to St. Tropez to see Ken's son, Warren Todd. After the trip to Paris, Vanderpump begins to plan a housewarming party for her new home, as well as a vow renewal, with the help of planner Kevin Lee. On the day of Vanderpump's vow renewal/housewarming, she finds herself in a confrontation with Resnick. After the ladies all get involved, Vanderpump begins to learn Kyle will never have her back. Vanderpump later continues with the ceremony and renews her vows with her husband. The night goes well until Maloof turns up on the eve of her marriage separation and Vanderpump doesn't run to her aid to console her.

Kim suggest a trip to Ojai, the women all share a five-bedroom mansion on picturesque grounds. During the trip Kim and Glanville begin to form an unlikely bond after they discuss their feeling and own their wrongdoings from the year prior. Kim heads to Las Vegas for her sons twenty-first birthday, but doesn't invite her sister Kyle. Kim reveals to her life coach that she and her sister Kyle still have unresolved issues and the life coach advises the two talk. Kim attempts to talk to Kyle at a Moroccan themed restaurant. Kim sees a psychic who inform her that there are ghosts inhabiting her house. Kim skip her nieces year sixth graduation for the planning to get a nose job. While the other ladies are in Las Vegas, they discuss if Kim getting a nose job, which will involve anesthesia and taking pain killers, is a wise idea for someone recently out of Rehab. Kim reveals her new nose to everyone during a backyard party. After arriving late to Paris and behaving in a strange way, the other ladies are worried of Kim's behavior due to it being reminiscent of the years prior when she was drinking. During a cooking class, the ladies are once again concerned by Kim's behavior but she is irritated by Vanderpump's, claiming it fake. She encourages her sister Kyle to confront Vanderpump.

Kyle and her daughter, Portia, invite all the ladies to a joint Portia's 4th birthday and Kennedy's 6th birthday party on Saturday, March 3, and Sunday, March 4, 2012, that is carnival-themed, featuring flying elephant rides, llamas, and unicorns. Kyle's husband Mauricio arrives late due to competing in a charity walk in heels for Armstrong's charity event. Kyle is annoyed at Kim for fueling the fire between Glanville and Maloof at her husband's business event, but Kim doesn't seem to care, which only makes Kyle more annoyed. During a trip to see Foster's estate, Kyle reveals to Foster that her and her sister's issues haven't been resolved despite Kim's time in rehab. During dinner at a Moroccan-themed restaurant, the two sisters attempt to talk. Kyle's daughter, Sophia, graduates sixth grade; Maloof and her husband attend and keep their distance, and Kim doesn't attend at all. Kyle later finds out Kim's lack of attendance was due to Kim planning to get a nose job done. Kyle heads to Vanderpump's home to discuss their mutual hurt and the rift between their friendship, and Kyle reveals she thinks Vanderpump holds grudges. Kyle confronts Vanderpump on top of the Eiffel Tower regarding her sister and Vanderpump's "fake concern." After the trip to Paris and back home in Beverly Hills, Kyle hurries to prepare for the opening of her new boutique, Kyle by Alene Too.

Armstrong continues to worry about a lawsuit that her husband left after his death. Armstrong is forced to settle it by selling some of the assets she cherishes. To cleanse her life of negativity, she hires a psychic to cleanse her home. At a Moroccan-themed restaurant, Armstrong opens up that she doesn't feel ready to date because it feels like she would be cheating on her late husband. She struggles with the feelings that while she loves him in life, she hates him in death due to his lies and the lawsuit he left her to deal with. At Vanderpump's tea party, Armstrong insists on stirring the drama between Glanville and Maloof by making innuendos. Vanderpump pulls her away from the table and reprimands her for her behavior, but after a bottle of champagne she continues. Armstrong calls Kim to inform her that she won't be attending her backyard party due to jetting off with a new man; however, she states that she doesn't know where her daughter Kennedy is, that being with Kyle and Kennedy, Portia, and Kyle having arrived earlier to Kim's house completely wet after swimming at Kyle's house. Due to the disturbing phone call, Kim and Kyle meet with Taylor to discuss the possibility of her abusing alcohol. She later turns down the trip to Paris to spend time with her daughter, Kennedy.

== Reception ==
=== U.S. television ratings ===
Ratings for the season decreased from previous seasons. On November 26, 2012, The Real Housewives of Beverly Hills hit a season high of 2.35 million viewers and a 1.1 rating (18–49 aged viewers) as well as increasing 30% among 18–49 aged viewers, up 19% among 25-54 aged viewers and up 26% amongall total viewers compared to the prior weeks episode. The Real Housewives of Beverly Hills then plunged by 34% to a two-season low on March 11, 2013, with 1.56 million viewers and a 0.7 18–49 rating. Season three averaged 1.11 total million viewers.

== Episodes ==
The Real Housewives of Beverly Hills season 3 episodes
No. overall	No. in season	Title	Original release date	U.S. viewers (millions)
42	1	"Down and Left Out in Beverly Hills"	November 5, 2012	1.81
Adrienne and Lisa finally take the time to sit down and fix their problems.
43	2	"The Higher the Heel, the Closer to God"	November 12, 2012	2.00
Kyle hosts a birthday party for her daughter, which turns out to be a big carnival adventure while Kyle's and Adrienne's husbands support a charity and walk a mile in high heels.
44	3	"Don't Sing for Your Supper"	November 19, 2012	1.87
Yolanda, the newest housewife to the group, invites the ladies over for dinner and Taylor doesn't agree with Yolanda's husband's views.
45	4	"Uh Oh, Somebody's Crying!"	November 26, 2012	2.35
Lisa and Adrienne's friendship still needs fixing, while Brandi and Kim begin a feud. After witnessing all the drama, Kim pitches the idea for a group trip to Ojai.
46	5	"Girls Gone Ojai'ld"	December 3, 2012	2.32
The housewives arrive in Ojai, and experience some down to earth fun by having golf cart races, mud fights within the spa, arm wrestling and good wine.
47	6	"She's Gone Too Far"	December 10, 2012	2.19
Kyle gifts her 16-year-old daughter a new Mercedes-Benz. Lisa invites the group over for a food sampling at SUR and tension rises as Brandi announces personal information regarding Adrienne.
48	7	"Oy, Faye"	December 17, 2012	2.10
Kim invites everyone but Kyle to Las Vegas for her son's birthday. Kyle hosts a dinner party, and Faye says things that end up rubbing Brandi the wrong way, which leads her to leaving.
49	8	"Unsolved Mistresses"	January 7, 2013	1.95
Taylor feels the need to rid the negative energy in her home by having a psychic cleanse her home, and Taylor is also forced to give up certain items after a lawsuit goes through. Brandi sits down with Scheana, the woman who slept with her ex-husband.
50	9	"Moroccan Madness"	January 14, 2013	1.93
Kim's life coach signals for Kim to take the first step and reach out to Kyle in order to improve their bond. Adrienne and Paul decide whether or not to sue Brandi for the hurtful things she's said. Another dinner party goes bad, and ends up in a rumble.
51	10	"Home Is Where the Art Is"	January 21, 2013	1.98
Kyle, Mauricio, Adrienne and Paul talk about what Brandi said. Yolanda decorates her ex-husbands mansion for fun. Kim hires a psychic which tells her there are ghosts within her home, and Brandi invites the group for a trip to Las Vegas.
52	11	"Stars and Strips"	January 28, 2013	2.04
Brandi and the ladies fly to Las Vegas, and strengthen their friendship. Kyle celebrates after her daughter graduates from sixth grade.
53	12	"Kim Nose Best"	February 4, 2013	2.08
While enjoying their time in Vegas, Brandi has the group try pole dancing. Later, Kim is under scrutiny for wanting to get a nose job and tensions rise as a feud is created while at the final dinner prior to departing Las Vegas.
54	13	"Game of Scones"	February 11, 2013	1.85
Lisa and Kyle mend their friendship and put the past behind them. Lisa hosts a tea party which brings Brandi and Adrienne together for the first time since their incident at a previous party. Adrienne denies the lawsuit with Camille backing her up. Brandi eventually storms off.
55	14	"White Party Pooper"	February 18, 2013	1.93
Kim hosts a party at her home to showcase her new nose. Taylor calls to inform Kim that she's not going to be able to make it because she's going on an unplanned trip to Beaver Creek, Colorado with her new boyfriend.
56	15	"The Real Housewives of Paris: Part Un"	February 25, 2013	1.89
Kyle and Kim are concerned with Taylor abusing alcohol. All of the housewives, excluding Adrienne, attend Yolanda's showing of her newest decorative creation. Lisa and Ken fly to St. Tropez where they visit Ken's first son, Warren, prior to meeting up with the rest of the housewives in Paris, France. Kim starts to act strange, which raises questions.
57	16	"The Real Housewives of Paris: Part Deux"	March 4, 2013	1.80
The housewives enjoy their vacation in Paris by shopping, visiting tourist attractions and jogging the streets.
58	17	"No Business Like Clothes Business"	March 11, 2013	1.56
All the ladies take a boat ride down the Seine River. Brandi and Kim strengthen their friendship. Kyle hosts her boutique opening and has a tearful heart to heart with Kim. Yolanda confronts Taylor again about things that Taylor has been saying about she and her husband leading to a showdown between the two at Kyle's boutique opening.
59	18	"A Shot Through the Heart"	March 18, 2013	1.60
Adrienne hosts a new vodka line launch party, and her divorce with Paul goes public. The ladies head to Lisa and Ken's vow renewal, where drama erupts between Brandi, Yolanda and Marisa, with Faye interjecting which makes matters worse. Faye throws some low blows at Brandi. Yolanda defends Brandi calling Faye "pathetic."
60	19	"Finale"	March 25, 2013	2.05
Lisa gets ready to renew her vows after thirty years of marriage but tensions rise once Faye starts a verbal argument with Lisa, which leads to all the ladies getting involved. Despite the drama, Lisa and Ken's vow renewal ceremony allows everyone to come together in peace. Adrienne later shows up to the ceremony, tears and all, as it's the same day her divorce with Paul has been announced to the public.
61	20	"Reunion: Part One"	March 25, 2013	2.29
The housewives come together to discuss the past season with Andy Cohen. Andy addresses Adrienne Maloof's departure from the series. Taylor talks about her excessive drinking habits. Yolanda expresses how she felt unwelcome when she joined the series. Lisa and Kyle's friendship is brought up and things get heated when Brandi, Yolanda and Kim give their input on the matter.
62	21	"Reunion: Part Two"	April 1, 2013	2.12
Kyle and Lisa finish their discussion regarding their friendship, which leads to little resolution. Adrienne and Paul's shocking divorce allegations are thrown into the conversation. Mauricio shares his stance in the Brandi/Adrienne conflict. After three seasons on the show, sisters Kim and Kyle discuss Kim's first year of sobriety as well as their difficulty trusting each other.
63	22	"Secrets Revealed"	April 8, 2013	1.57
This special provides never-before-seen footage from both the third season and the reunion. Kyle accompanies Lisa for her first mammogram. Brandi and Yolanda's unique friendship is explained further. Taylor erupts in a meltdown, which is directed at Adrienne. Missing footage from the reunion includes the housewives discussing Faye's actions.
