= The Real Housewives Ultimate Girls Trip =

American reality television series

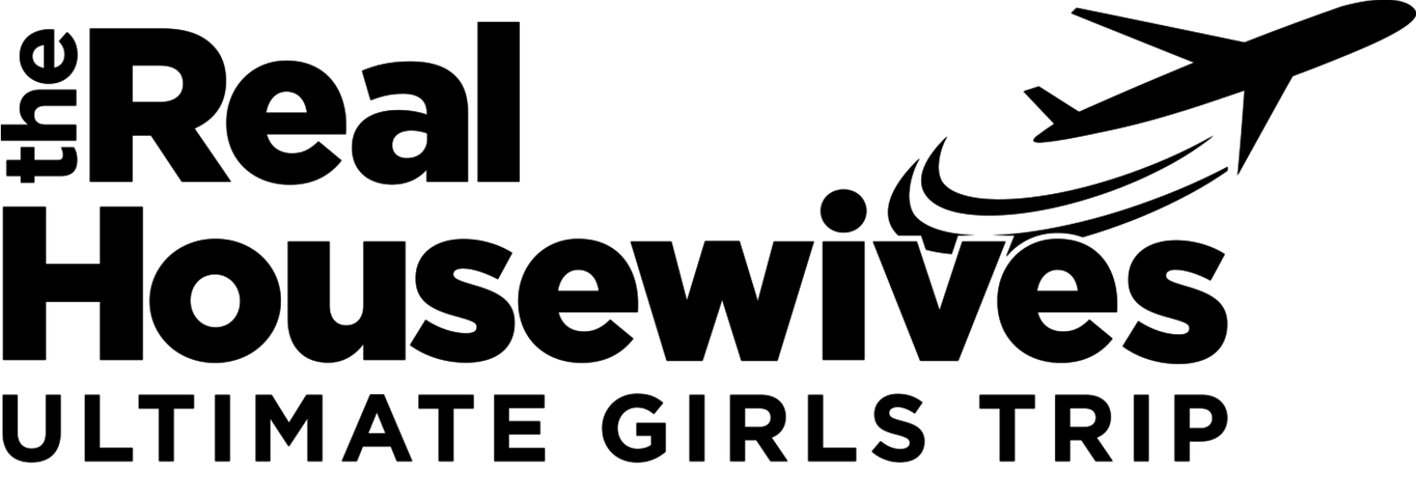
- Genre: Reality
- Starring: Cynthia Bailey; Teresa Giudice; Melissa Gorga; Luann de Lesseps; Kenya Moore; Kyle Richards; Ramona Singer; Taylor Armstrong; Brandi Glanville; Vicki Gunvalson; Tamra Judge; Eva Marcille; Dorinda Medley; Phaedra Parks; Jill Zarin; Gizelle Bryant; Candiace Dillard Bassett; Heather Gay; Leah McSweeney; Alexia Nepola; Marysol Patton; Whitney Rose; Porsha Williams; Kelly Killoren Bensimon; Sonja Morgan; Kristen Taekman; Lisa Barlow
- Country of origin: United States
- Original language: English
- No. of seasons: 5
- No. of episodes: 36

Production
- Executive producers: Lisa Shannon; Dan Peirson; Darren Ward; John Paparazzo; Glenda Cox; Andy Cohen
- Camera setup: Multi-camera
- Production company: Shed Media

Original release
- Network: Peacock
- Release: November 16, 2021 – January 4, 2024
- Network: Bravo
- Release: August 9, 2026 – present

Related
- The Real Housewives franchise

The Real Housewives Ultimate Girls Trip, abbreviated as RHUGT, is an American reality television series that premiered on Peacock on November 16, 2021. The series follows several women from The Real Housewives franchise as they vacation together.

== Overview and casting ==
In September 2019, it was announced an untitled The Real Housewives franchise spin-off was in development at Peacock. In February 2021, it was announced Peacock had greenlit a limited series following multiple women from different Housewives installments living together for a period of time.

== Cast ==
Timeline of the cast
Cast member	Franchise	Seasons				
Cast member	Franchise	1	2	3	4	5
Cynthia Bailey	Atlanta	Main				Guest
Luann de Lesseps	New York City	Main			Main	Main
Teresa Giudice	New Jersey	Main				Main
Melissa Gorga	New Jersey	Main				Guest
Kenya Moore	Atlanta	Main				
Kyle Richards	Beverly Hills	Main				Main
Ramona Singer	New York City	Main			Main	
Taylor Armstrong	Beverly Hills		Main			
Brandi Glanville	Beverly Hills		Main			
Vicki Gunvalson	Orange County		Main			Main
Tamra Judge	Orange County		Main			Guest
Eva Marcille	Atlanta		Main			
Dorinda Medley	New York City		Main		Main	Guest
Phaedra Parks	Atlanta		Main			Guest
Jill Zarin	New York City		Main			Guest
Gizelle Bryant	Potomac			Main		Main
Candiace Dillard Bassett	Potomac			Main		Guest
Heather Gay	Salt Lake City			Main		Guest
Leah McSweeney	New York City			Main		
Alexia Nepola	Miami			Main		Guest
Marysol Patton	Miami			Main		Guest
Whitney Rose	Salt Lake City			Main		Guest
Porsha Williams	Atlanta			Main		Main
Kelly Killoren Bensimon	New York City				Main	Guest
Sonja Morgan	New York City				Main	Guest
Kristen Taekman	New York City				Main	
Lisa Barlow	Salt Lake City			Guest		Main

== Episodes ==
=== Series overview ===
Season	Episodes	Originally released	
Season	Episodes	First released	Last released
1	7	November 16, 2021	December 9, 2021
2	7	June 23, 2022	July 21, 2022
3	7	March 23, 2023	April 20, 2023
4	6	December 14, 2023	January 4, 2024
5	9	August 9, 2026	October 4, 2026

=== Season 1 (2021) ===
The Real Housewives Ultimate Girls Trip season 1 episodes
No. overall	No. in season	Title	Original release date
1	1	"When Wives Collide"	November 16, 2021
2	2	"Days of Our Wives"	November 16, 2021
3	3	"Girl(friend) Interrupted"	November 16, 2021
4	4	"Fourth Wall Down"	November 18, 2021
5	5	"Stormy Waters"	November 25, 2021
6	6	"Bonfire of the Frenemies"	December 2, 2021
7	7	"Go Big Before You Go Home"	December 9, 2021

=== Season 2: Ex-Wives Club (2022) ===
The Real Housewives Ultimate Girls Trip season 2 episodes
No. overall	No. in season	Title	Original release date
8	1	"Return to Blue Stone Manor"	June 23, 2022
9	2	"There's a Jill in the Air"	June 23, 2022
10	3	"Dazed and Excused"	June 23, 2022
11	4	"Speakeasy and Act Tough"	June 30, 2022
12	5	"The Ultimate Thirst"	July 7, 2022
13	6	"Tis the Season?"	July 14, 2022
14	7	"Leavin' on a Prayer"	July 21, 2022

=== Season 3: Thailand (2023) ===
The Real Housewives Ultimate Girls Trip season 3 episodes
No. overall	No. in season	Title	Original release date
15	1	"We're in Thailand, B*tches!"	March 23, 2023
16	2	"The Elephants in the Room"	March 23, 2023
17	3	"Don't Rock the Boat"	March 23, 2023
18	4	"Dangerous Games"	March 30, 2023
19	5	"Oh Bottle, Where Art Thou?"	April 6, 2023
20	6	"Tantric Tantrums"	April 13, 2023
21	7	"Phuket Me Not"	April 20, 2023

=== Season 4: RHONY Legacy (2023–2024) ===
The Real Housewives Ultimate Girls Trip season 4 episodes
No. overall	No. in season	Title	Original release date
22	1	"Vive Legacy"	December 14, 2023
23	2	"The Pirate Part Deux"	December 14, 2023
24	3	"Take Me Out to the Hockey Game"	December 14, 2023
25	4	"A Yacht of Attention"	December 21, 2023
26	5	"RHONY Relics"	December 28, 2023
27	6	"(Going) Out with a Bang"	January 4, 2024

=== Season 5: Roaring 20th (2026) ===
The Real Housewives Ultimate Girls Trip season 5 episodes
No. overall	No. in season	Title	Rating (18–49)	Original release date	U.S. viewers (millions)
28	1	"Back Where It All Began"	TBA	August 9, 2026	N/A
29	2	"Leather You Like It or Not"	TBA	August 16, 2026	N/A
30	3	"White Lies"	TBA	August 23, 2026	N/A
31	4	"Meet Me at the Altar... Ego Party"	TBA	August 30, 2026	N/A
32	5	"To Peach Her Own"	TBA	September 6, 2026	N/A
33	6	"Cockies and Conversation"	TBA	September 13, 2026	N/A
34	7	"Sisterhood of the Traveling Housewives"	TBA	September 20, 2026	N/A
35	8	"Mic Drop, Please"	TBA	September 27, 2026	TBD
36	9	"Bluestone Manners"	TBA	October 4, 2026	TBD

== Production ==
=== Seasons 1–3 ===
The first season was filmed at the Triton Luxury Villa in Turks and Caicos Islands and features Cynthia Bailey, Luann de Lesseps, Teresa Giudice, Melissa Gorga, Kenya Moore, Kyle Richards and Ramona Singer. Vicki Gunvalson and Garcelle Beauvais both stated they were initially cast for the first season, but were unable to commit to the project due to the COVID-19 pandemic. Principal photography began in April 2021. The first season premiered on November 16, 2021.

The second season was filmed in September 2021 at Dorinda Medley's Blue Stone Manor located in Great Barrington, Massachusetts. Officially titled The Real Housewives Ultimate Girls Trip: Ex-Wives Club, the second season features former Housewives stars who are no longer cast-members on their original series. The cast consists of Taylor Armstrong, Brandi Glanville, Gunvalson, Tamra Judge, Eva Marcille, Medley, Phaedra Parks and Jill Zarin. The second season premiered on June 23, 2022.

Production on the third season began on July 18, 2022, in Thailand. The cast consists of Gizelle Bryant, Candiace Dillard Bassett, Heather Gay, Leah McSweeney, Alexia Nepola, Marysol Patton, Whitney Rose and Porsha Williams. Tinsley Mortimer was initially cast for the season but was replaced by Williams, citing "personal reasons" for her decision to exit. The third season, titled The Real Housewives Ultimate Girls Trip: Thailand, premiered on March 23, 2023.

=== Unaired Ex-Wives Club: Morocco season ===
On January 9, 2023, Bravo announced a fourth season, the second Ex-Wives Club, taking place in Marrakesh, Morocco. The cast included returning housewives Glanville, Gunvalson, Marcille and Parks; as well as Camille Grammer, Caroline Manzo, Alex McCord and Gretchen Rossi joining as new additions. The season completed production but was indefinitely shelved after Manzo accused Glanville of sexual misconduct during filming, prompting an investigation into the allegations. On January 26, 2024, one year after production, Manzo filed a lawsuit, Caroline Manzo v. Bravo Media LLC et al., in New York State Court against Bravo Media LLC, Forest Productions Inc., Warner Bros. Entertainment Inc., NBCUniversal Media, LLC, Shed Media US Inc., and Peacock TV LLC.

=== Seasons 4–5 ===
On May 15, 2023, Peacock announced that a fifth season, titled The Real Housewives Ultimate Girls Trip: RHONY Legacy, would take place in St. Barts. Following the indefinite shelving of Ex-Wives Club: Morocco, it premiered as the series' official fourth season on December 14, 2023. It featured former housewives from the first thirteen seasons of The Real Housewives of New York City, before it was recast for the fourteenth season. De Lesseps, Singer and Medley returned, and were joined by Sonja Morgan, Kristen Taekman and Kelly Killoren Bensimon.

On November 16, 2025, Andy Cohen announced that a successor series under the working title The Real Housewives: Ultimate Road Trip would debut on Bravo in 2026. The series is set commemorate two decades of "unforgettable moments, connection, and legacy, while ushering in the next era of Housewives." In January 2026, the series was announced as the official fifth season, The Real Housewives Ultimate Girls Trip: Roaring 20th. The cast includes returning housewives Bryant, de Lesseps, Giudice, Gunvalson, Richards, and Williams, as well as Lisa Barlow, marking her first appearance in the series. NeNe Leakes is also set to appear on the season, marking her first appearance on Bravo since leaving The Real Housewives of Atlanta in 2020. The fifth season premiered on August 9, 2026.

== International adaptations ==
=== The Real Housewives Ultimate Girls Trip: South Africa ===
On March 28, 2024, a South African iteration of The Real Housewives Ultimate Girls Trip was announced by Showmax. Filmed in Jamaica, the series unites several women from the South African Real Housewives franchises, including Christall Kay and Lethabo Lejoy Mathatho from The Real Housewives of Johannesburg, LaConco, Londie London and Nonku Williams from The Real Housewives of Durban, Beverly Steyn from The Real Housewives of Cape Town, Liz Prins from The Real Housewives of Gqeberha, and Melany Viljoen from Die Real Housewives van Pretoria.

The series premiered on May 27, 2024.

=== The Real Housewives Ultimate Girls Trip: Africa ===
Showmax announced a second Ultimate series on October 13, 2025. Filmed in Brazil, the series bring together cast members from the South African entries, as well as include women from both the Kenyan and Nigerian installments of the franchise.

The cast consists of Princess Jecoco from The Real Housewives of Abuja, Christall Kay and Madam Evodia Mogase from The Real Housewives of Johannesburg, Dr. Catherine Masitsa and Zena Nyambu from The Real Housewives of Nairobi, Annie Mthembu, Angel Ndlela, and Jojo Robinson from The Real Housewives of Durban, and Mariam Timmer from The Real Housewives of Lagos. The series is set to premiere on November 28, 2025.

=== Australian series ===
In May 2025, an Australian spin-off of The Real Housewives Ultimate Girls Trip was revealed to be in development by Matchbox Pictures. The series was set to combine cast members from both The Real Housewives of Melbourne and The Real Housewives of Sydney franchises. On 17 February 2026, Universal International Studios announced that Matchbox Pictures would cease operations in Australia.
