= Sonja Morgan =

American socialite and television personality (born 1963)

- Morgan in 2025
- Born: Sonja Tremont; November 25, 1963 (age 62); Averill Park, New York, U.S.
- Education: Fashion Institute of Technology (BS)
- Occupations: Television personality; philanthropist; entrepreneur
- Known for: The Real Housewives of New York City
- Spouse: John Adams Morgan (m. 1998; div. 2006)
- Children: 1
- Website: sonjamorganofficial.com

Sonja Morgan (née Tremont; born November 25, 1963) is an American television personality. She is popularly known for her starring role on the Bravo reality television series The Real Housewives of New York City.

== Early life ==
Sonja Tremont was born on 25 November 1963, in Averill Park, New York, to parents Dennis Howard Tremont and Sandra Cooper (née Quell). Her grandfather and father ran a lumber company in Averill Park,the town where Sonja was also raised. She is of German, English, and Luxembourgish ancestry. Her ancestor Nicholas Tremont arrived in the United States sometime before 1880.

== Career ==
Morgan studied marketing at the Fashion Institute of Technology. Her fashion line, Sonja by Sonja Morgan, was launched in 2015 and sold at the Vanessa Noel store on East 64th Street and online. Morgan's line also retailed in Century 21 stores prior to their bankruptcy filing in 2020 following the COVID-19 pandemic. In the 1980s and 1990s, Morgan worked as an interior director, event planner, and hostess for a series of high-end Manhattan restaurants.

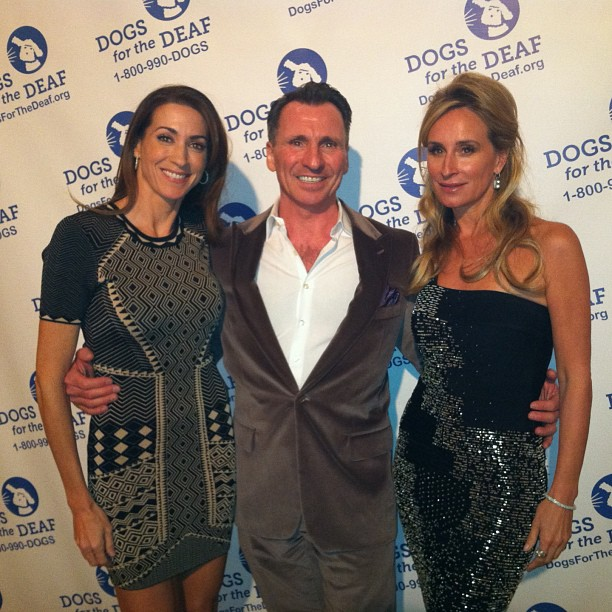
Morgan (right) with Andrea Arden and John Festa at a charity event for Dogs for the Deaf in New York City in 2013.

In 2010, Morgan joined the cast of Bravo's hit reality television series The Real Housewives of New York City during its third season. She stayed with the show until 2021, remaining a main cast member for eleven seasons. Widely regarded as a franchise fan favorite, she was voted "Best Comedienne" in the fan-chosen Real Housewives Awards for four consecutive years, from 2015 through 2018. In 2021, celebrity video messaging platform Cameo disclosed that Morgan was among their top ten highest-earning celebrities the previous year.

In 2017, Morgan made her off-Broadway debut in the play Sex Tips for Straight Women by a Gay Man. In 2021, she launched a regional tour of improv shows entitled Sonja in Your City, playing sold-out shows in cities including New York, Boston, Baltimore, and Washington, D.C.. She is a frequent guest on Andy Cohen's late night chat show, Watch What Happens Live and she has made guest appearances on a number of other television series, including Difficult People, Kocktails with Khloé, and Worst Cooks in America. In 2023, she co-starred in a Real Housewives spin-off series with longtime castmate Luann de Lesseps, titled Luann & Sonja: Welcome to Crappie Lake, which premiered on July 9, 2023. Morgan starred in the fourth season of The Real Housewives Ultimate Girls Trip, a spin-off featuring various women from The Real Housewives franchise, which premiered in December 2023 on the NBC streaming service Peacock.

A longtime philanthropist, Morgan has contributed to charities involving children, visual and performing arts, animal rights groups, and LGBTQ+ rights. Her show, Sonja in Your City, which has included cabaret and burlesque elements, has helped raise money for charity with performances in cities including New York, Boston, Baltimore, San Diego, Toronto, and Sydney. She received a Singular Sensation Award in 1990 at the St. Regis Hotel for her work alongside Vanessa Noel and Mira Sorvino for her philanthropic work. In July 2013, she received a New York State Senate Award for charity work.

In February 2026, Morgan was announced as a cast member in the upcoming E! reality television show The Golden Life. The series follows Morgan as well as former Real Housewives alumni Ramona Singer, Luann de Lesseps, Kelly Bensimon, and Dorinda Medley uniting in Palm Beach, Florida. The series was greenlit for additional episodes in The Hamptons, New York in July 2026.

== Filmography ==
=== Television ===
Year	Title	Notes
2010–2021	The Real Housewives of New York City	Main Cast (Seasons 3–13)
2014	Million Dollar Listing New York	Episode: "Bidding War Bitches"
2015	The Millionaire Matchmaker	Episode: "Perez Hilton & Sonja Morgan"
2020; 2021	Worst Cooks in America	Contestant (Season 19); Panelist (Season 21)
2021	The $100,000 Pyramid	Contestant; Season 5, Episode 10
2023	Luann & Sonja: Welcome to Crappie Lake	Main Cast
2023; 2026	The Real Housewives Ultimate Girls Trip	Main Cast (Season 4); Guest (Season 5)
2025	Celebrity Name That Tune	Episode: "Reality Realness"
2026	The Golden Life	Main Cast

=== Theatre ===
Year	Title	Notes
2016	Sex Tips for Straight Women from a Gay Man	Off-Broadway stage debut

== Personal life ==
Morgan met John Adams Morgan, a member of the prominent Morgan family, in the 1990s while working as an emcee at an Italian restaurant on Madison Avenue for jet sets, heads of states, and celebrities. They were married from 1998 until 2006. The couple wed and spent much of their marriage residing on Caritas, a 3.5-acre private island at the tip of Wallack's Point in Stamford, Connecticut. They have one daughter, Quincy Adams Morgan.

As a public figure, Morgan has told stories of the many prominent men that she encountered as a young single woman in New York City. The list includes tennis player John McEnroe, actor Jack Nicholson, comedian Richard Lewis, musician Eric Clapton, and Prince Albert of Monaco, among others.

=== Legal trouble ===
Following Morgan's divorce, she filed for Chapter 11, paying off creditors for four years after. She sold her house in Ramatuelle for $5.7 million, and mortgaged her $3.3 million home in New York City. The American Home Mortgage Servicing received $600,000 from Morgan's estate and the deed to her $5.8 million home in Telluride, Colorado.

In June 2010, Morgan was arrested for failing to stop at a stop sign and later charged with a DWI.

In June 2015, Morgan paid $6.95 million to Hannibal Pictures Incorporated following a lawsuit filed against her due to an abandoned movie project.

In May 2025, Morgan was banned from the restaurant Tucci in New York for walking out on a $1,000 bill.

Later that month, Morgan was involved in a dispute over a $20,000 bill for HVAC work done on her former Upper East Side townhouse in 2024. The company was initially paid but her bank later reversed the transaction and removed funds, of which Morgan claims she was not notified. The funds were reportedly returned to the HVAC company.
