= The Real Housewives of Beverly Hills season 2 =

The Real Housewives of Beverly Hills
- Season 2
- Cover used by iTunes (Left to right) Kim Richards, Taylor Armstrong, Lisa Vanderpump, Kyle Richards, Adrienne Maloof and Camille Grammer
- Starring: Taylor Armstrong; Camille Grammer; Adrienne Maloof; Kim Richards; Kyle Richards; Lisa Vanderpump
- No. of episodes: 24

Release
- Original network: Bravo
- Original release: September 5, 2011 – February 16, 2012

Season chronology
- ← Previous; Season 1 Next → Season 3

The second season of The Real Housewives of Beverly Hills, an American reality television series, aired on Bravo from September 5, 2011 to February 16, 2012, and is primarily filmed in Beverly Hills, California.

The season focuses on the personal and professional lives of Taylor Armstrong, Camille Grammer, Adrienne Maloof, Kim Richards, Kyle Richards and Lisa Vanderpump. The season consisted of 24 episodes.

This season marked the final regular appearance for Camille Grammer.

== Production and crew ==
The Real Housewives of Beverly Hills first season was successful for the network, premiering to 1.5 total million viewers as well as the finale being the highest-rated episode of the season with 4.2 million viewers, when combined with multiple evening reruns. In March 2011, a month after the conclusion of season one, it was renewed for a second season. In July 2011, the premiere date and cast were announced for the second season.

The following month in August 2011, it was revealed that although the filming had ended a month ago, the producers were interviewing the housewives to introduce the season. The interview was to have the women discuss the events that occurred after filming round Taylor Armstrong's husband's suicide and explain to the viewers that season two occurred prior. In the same month the president of Bravo, Frances Berwick, revealed that the show was in the process of being re-edited in light of the death of Russell Armstrong. After the network's consideration of changing the premiere date, they decided to continue with their plans and left it unchanged.

The season premiere "Back to Beverly Hills" was aired on September 5, 2011, while the twentieth episode "The Real Wedding of Beverly Hills" served as the season finale, and was aired on January 23, 2012. It was followed by a three-part reunion that aired on January 30, February 6 and February 13, 2012 and a "Lost Footage" episode on February 16, 2012, which marked the conclusion of the season. Alex Baskin, Chris Cullen, Douglas Ross, Greg Stewart, Toni Gallagher, Dave Rupel and Andy Cohen are recognized as the series' executive producers; it is produced and distributed by Evolution Media.

== Cast and synopsis ==
=== Cast ===
All six wives from season one returned for the second installment. Along with the six wives, two recurring cast members were introduced as "friends of the housewives", Brandi Glanville and Dana Wilkey. Glanville and Wilkey are described as women "who certainly know how to spice things up in the world's most famous zip code."

Glanville joins the series having a friendship with Adrienne Maloof and history with, former house-guest to Lisa Vanderpump, Cedric. Glanville spent seventeen years of her life travelling the world as a high fashion model with specialties on the catwalk and as a print model for magazine such as Glamour and Cosmopolitan as well as working for design houses such as Giorgio Armani, Chanel and Gucci. Glanville joined the series shortly after a divorce, from that altered her trust in men. Glanville divorced Eddie Cibrian shortly after learning of his affair with LeAnn Rimes, and the two still share custody of their children, Jake and Mason. When Glanville isn't raising her sons, she's often enjoying playing golf or hanging out with her best friend, Jennifer Gimenez.

Wilkey may have become a recurring cast member in season two, but she guest starred on the first season as the event planner behind Taylor Armstrong's $60,000 tea party. When she's not planning children's events, she's planning anything from film premieres to elaborate parties across The U.S. and Europe. Wilkey moved around a lot as a child and was deeply affected by a car accident that put her mother in a coma, which later resulted in her death. Moving from the East coast to the west at the age of fifteen, Wilkey graduated from University of Southern California with honors and in later years she founded the Adwil Agency, a boutique web application development company and product placement firm. Wilkey is mother to her 22-month year old son, John Cayden Flynn, and relishes with planning her wedding for the following year which will result in gaining two adult step-children. When she's not running her event planning business or raising her son she's buying couture clothes and adding to her Barbie collection.

=== Synopsis ===
The Real Housewives of Beverly Hills season two begins with an introduction to the series at Adrienne Maloof's home with Maloof, Lisa Vanderpump, Camille Grammer and Kim and Kyle Richards discussing the recent suicide of Taylor Armstrong's husband Russell Armstrong, their financial issues and the abuse that circulated their relationship. The events following the discussion between the ladies occurred prior to his death.

The season officially begins with Kyle and her husband packing up their home, to move into their new home that is much larger. Kyle and her sister Kim attempt to move forward after the event that occurred in season one. Grammer prepares for her new life as a single woman, dealing with being along on a large property. Later, Maloof hosts a dinner party to celebrate Grammer's new role in the sitcom, $#*! My Dad Says with all the other ladies invited. Maloof introduced her new puppy, Jackpot, at the party that she thinks will rivals Vanderpump's dog, Giggy. At the Maloof and her husband have tension over things including the popping of wine, giving a toast and the placing of napkin, and it doesn't go unnoticed. Armstrong reveals that she and her husband are working on their relationship and are getting relationship therapy but Vanderpump's husband, Ken Todd, shocks the others when he implies that couple's therapy makes you weak. With Ken offending Armstrong, she leaves the table and heads to the bathroom with Kyle following soon after which leaves Vanderpump feeling uncomfortable in her friendship with Kyle.

Armstrong opens up about some serious problems with her marriage during a trip to Grammer to-be-sold home in Colorado. Armstrong attends a tea party with the other ladies hosted by Vanderpump, during the tea party Armstrong reveals her true feelings on Vanderpump. Armstrong isn't feeling supported by the other women on her feeling and claims they have all had negative things to say on Vanderpump. After leaving and returning, the ladies question Armstrong on her marital issues and the contradictions. Grammer walks out after claiming Armstrong needs to be honest and revealing Armstrong's marital secrets. After the tea party, Armstrong wants to put the drama to the back of her mind and throws her daughter Kennedy a 5th birthday party where Ace Young performs on February 25, 2011. The drama doesn't stay away for long after Armstrong fears running into Grammer at Maloof's glamorous, backyard fashion show. Armstrong and Grammer's feud worsen at a Malibu house party hosted by Glanville, where Armstrong completely breaks down and Glanville ends up asking her to leave. Armstrong is uninvited from Kyle's annual white party after Grammer receives a lawsuit from Armstrong's husband, and the other ladies fear they may be next. As the women head to Lanai. Hawaii, Armstrong stays in Beverly Hills to work on her troubled marriage. At the Vanderpump's launch party for SUR, Armstrong arrives with her psychiatrist with visible bruising under her eye. Armstrong sits down with the ladies to communicate with the help of mediation from her guest. She is confronted by the ladies on her conflicting stories with her marriage and Armstrong reveals to the wives that she has left her husband Russel and that she had been abused by him.

Vanderpump finds out that her daughter, Pandora and her partner are engaged and is ecstatic because she think they're perfect for each other. Vanderpump hosts an extravagant engagement party for her daughter, featuring camels, snakes and circus performers. Vanderpump continues to relish her daughter's engagement helping her organize the wedding including invitations and lingerie shopping. While wedding dress shopping with Pandora, Pandora insists her mum also wears a wedding dress at the wedding. Despite her prior issue with Armstrong, Vanderpump, her daughter and Armstrong head to Las Vegas for Pandora's bachelorette party as well as Armstrong's birthday. During the trip Vanderpump and Armstrong form a bond. Vanderpump hosts a launch party for her new lounge and restaurant, SUR. Vanderpump sends home a waitress, Scheana Shay, after she learns the history of her and Glanville. Another familiar face arrives at the event, Vanderpump's former house guest Cedric, who is swiftly removed. Vanderpump daughter gets married at Vanderpump's manor, in a million dollar, fairy tale ceremony.

Kyle hosts a charity cocktail event for the Lollipop Theater Network, but the attention at the party turns to the entrance of Brandi Glanville. The ladies begins to gossip about Glanville's alleged past with Vanderpump's former house guest Cedric, which leaves them questing her intentions. The question of Glanville continues when Maloof hosts a barbecue at her home and Glanville arrives and her bold language leaves Kyle and Dana Wilkey shocked. The rising tension worsens at a game night hosted by Wilkey. With everyone attending but Vanderpump, Kyle and her sister Kim hide Glanville's crutches. Later that night, Kim Richards who keeps going to the bathroom leaves Glanville with a few opinions that she is open to share. Glanville enrages both sisters and results the three getting into an explosive argument throwing accusations around. Kyle and Glanville get into a physical altercation at Glanville's house party in Malibu in the midst of Armstrong and Grammer's feud. Kyle shoots the cover photo of her memoir, Life Is Not a Reality Show: Keeping It Real with the Housewife Who Does It All.

Kim Richards skips Vanderpump daughter's engagement party for something she has been keeping a secret, that she is seeing a man. While Paul's night of beauty, Kim learns that mixing alcohol with her medication isn't a good idea but is amendment she hasn't broken her sobriety. Paul Nassif explains that the medication's affect causing sedation may be reason of her erratic behavior. The day after Kyle's séance that Kim chose no to attend, she reveals to Kyle that she has been seeing a man for a year. Kyle remembers him for a premiere they attended and questions why Kim kept it secret. Kim then drops another bomb that she is moving further away which leaves Kyle in tears. Later, Kim breaks down to Kyle about her fears of losing her family for choosing to have a relationship with her boyfriend, Ken. She reveals that he is the boss in the relationship which raises concerns for Kyle that he is obsessed with Kim and is controlling. Kim misses her first and second flight to the Hawaii trip, which leaves her sister worried and questioning her health. Kim arrives at the launch party of SUR flustered, after frantically getting ready, with her boyfriend. At the event, Kim reveals to her sister that her boyfriend is controlling and doesn't treat her well and the two have an emotional revelation that results in Kim telling Kyle that her period is late. Kim didn't attend the reunion and filmed an exclusive one-on-one with host, Andy Cohen. She revealed to him that she is an alcoholic and discussed life after rehab.

Maloof is concerned when her family is forced to makes some business decision with moving their basketball team the Sacramento Kings, which leaves their fans unhappy. Maloof heads to Sacramento to see what might be their last game in Sacramento and invites Kim along. In Sacramento Maloof is concerned by Kim's behavior and questions her sobriety. Maloof hosts a day of relaxation at a spa, but no one is left feeling relaxed when the tension between the Richards sister and Glanville surfaces. Kim arrives to Hawaii a day late with her boyfriend, having missed most of the activities, Kyle calls her out on her strange and irresponsible behavior.

Grammer going through a tumultuous divorce with Kelsey Grammer, must say goodbye to her Colorado home. To go out in style she invites the other ladies for some fun on the ski slopes. Grammer receives a lawsuit from Armstrong's husband after her allegations at Vanderpump's tea party.

== Reception ==
=== U.S. television ratings ===
The Real Housewives of Beverly Hills premiered to 2.18 total million viewers and the series' ratings continued to grow, attracting 2.8 million total viewers January 16, 2012 episode "Night of a Thousand Surprises", making Bravo the number one cable network on television among females 18-49 in the 9pm hour.

The finale of The Real Housewives of Beverly Hills season 2, that aired on January 23, 2012, became the highest-rated episode of the season with 3.03 million total viewers and 2.01 million adults 18-49. It marked the first time the series has delivered over 2 million viewers among adults 18-49.

"The Real Housewives of Beverly Hills" season two Reunion Part One delivered 3.9 million total viewers and 2.6 million adults 18-49 on January 30, marking double digit growth with a 25 percent and 21 percent increase respectively compared to the prior season's"reunion part one."

== Episodes ==
The Real Housewives of Beverly Hills season 2 episodes
| No. overall | No. in season | Title | Original release date | U.S. viewers (millions) |
|---|---|---|---|---|
| 18 | 1 | "Back to Beverly Hills" | September 5, 2011 | 2.18 |
The first episode begins with the ladies attending a dinner party hosted by Adrienne in Camille's honor. Taylor is flustered after a chance meeting with Cedric because she fears Lisa's wrath. Kyle and Camille restart their friendship and seem to get along. After Taylor opens up about her marriage counseling, Lisa's husband Ken says, "If I had to go see a (marriage) therapist...I would feel weak." Kyle comforts a distraught Taylor.
| 19 | 2 | "Blame It on the Altitude" | September 12, 2011 | 1.56 |
| 20 | 3 | "Rocky Mountain Highs and Lows" | September 19, 2011 | 1.71 |
| 21 | 4 | "Gossip Girls" | September 26, 2011 | 1.88 |
| 22 | 5 | "$25,000 Sunglasses?!" | October 3, 2011 | 1.97 |
Adrienne holds a barbecue, and invites friend Brandi Glanville. Brandi and Camille bond instantly over their very ugly high-profile divorces, but the other ladies perceive Brandi as not fitting in with the group. Lisa does the commentary for the royal wedding on CNN.
| 23 | 6 | "Let the Games Begin" | October 10, 2011 | 1.91 |
Taylor's friend Dana helps Taylor bake cookies and Lisa throws a dinner party. At the dinner table, Pandora reveals that she got engaged and Lisa gets emotional. Kyle and Adrienne have lunch and Adrienne tells Kyle about Kim's erratic behaviour. Kyle expresses her feelings towards Brandi and Adrienne suggests that Kyle give her some time. Later, Adrienne and Brandi have coffee and Adrienne suggests that Brandi show her fun side to the ladies. Dana hosts a game night for the ladies, but Camille questions her party-planning talents. The night comes to a close when Kim offends Brandi, Brandi accuses Kim of being on drugs, Kyle insults Brandi's parenting skills and Brandi lashes out with threats like "I'm going to kill you!"
| 24 | 7 | "Game Night Gone Wild!" | October 17, 2011 | 2.10 |
Kim, Kyle, and Brandi continue their fight and Kim and Brandi come to blows. Once the drama has passed, and Brandi has stormed out, Camille and Taylor talk about why Brandi is so bothered by the "slut" accusations. Kyle tells Lisa and Adrienne about Game Night and Lisa is shocked. Taylor has lunch with Brandi and she suggests that Brandi and Kyle make peace. Kyle and Kim start to bicker again but quickly put an end to it. The ladies attend Camille's charity luncheon where Kyle and Lisa exchange whispers. Lisa finds it hard to form a friendship with Brandi because of the things she has heard about her from Kim and Kyle. Adrienne and Kim talk about Kim's relationship with Kyle.
| 25 | 8 | "The Opposite of Relaxation" | October 24, 2011 | 2.11 |
Kyle, Taylor, and Dana discuss Brandi's accusations towards Kim on Game Night. Lisa tries to teach Adrienne how to cook a chicken but Adrienne screws it up by putting soap on the chicken to wash it. Adrienne hosts a spa get-together at her home, but it's far from relaxing: the Richards sisters are still steamed by Brandi's game-night antics. Kyle tries to lay the blame on both herself and Brandi while Brandi refuses to apologize for comments about Kim. Brandi leaves the party early without resolving the issue, while Kyle and Kim begin their own spat.
| 26 | 9 | "Otherwise Engaged" | October 31, 2011 | 1.69 |
When an article about Taylor's marriage appears in "Us" magazine, Taylor and Russell think that Lisa is responsible. The ladies attend Lisa's daughter's 3-ring engagement party, complete with circus performers, camels, and snakes. But Kim is a no-show—again—as she's busy keeping a secret from Kyle.
| 27 | 10 | "Your Face or Mine?" | November 7, 2011 | 2.14 |
Taylor tells Kyle about her feelings towards Lisa. The women are treated to cosmetic treatments by Paul Nassif. Kyle holds a seance.
| 28 | 11 | "Tempest in a Tea Party" | November 14, 2011 | 2.32 |
Kyle gets emotional when she meets Kim's new boyfriend: Ken. Adrienne celebrates her husband Paul's birthday and they discuss Taylor and her marriage. Taylor gets nominated for an event and invites all the ladies except for Lisa because she feels that Lisa is not her true friend. Lisa hosts an elegant tea party at her house and Taylor reveals her true feelings towards her. Fighting ensues between Taylor and Lisa, and Camille and Kyle are dragged into it. Taylor storms out and while she is gone, the others discuss the truth about Taylor's marriage. When Taylor comes back, Camille lays it all on the table, including the claims of Russell's domestic violence.
| 29 | 12 | "The Great Divide" | November 21, 2011 | 2.06 |
Camille and Taylor continue their argument and Camille storms out, calling Taylor a liar and subsequently ruining their friendship. Lisa and Taylor put an end to their feud and promise to tell the truth from now on, which makes Kyle uncomfortable. Taylor plans an expensive birthday party for her daughter. Adrienne feels offended when Lisa plans to throw her daughter's bachelorette party in Planet Hollywood, which is Adrienne's competition. Adrienne talks to Kyle about this at Taylor's daughter's party. Kim continues moving into Ken's house and Lisa helps Pandora plan her wedding.
| 30 | 13 | "Adrienne's Fashion Show" | November 28, 2011 | 2.26 |
Adrienne throws a fashion show in her backyard. Taylor is worried about encountering Camille there. Adrienne confronts Lisa at the show. Brandi tells Kyle that she is planning to throw a party for the women and there will be belly dancing.
| 31 | 14 | "Malibu Beach Party From Hell" | December 5, 2011 | 2.20 |
Lisa decides which tables she will use for Pandora's wedding. Kyle's husband Mauricio throws a dinner party at her house and Kyle invites Faye Resnick. Lisa designs her new restaurant SUR. Brandi, feeling that it is her turn to host something for the ladies, throws a nice Malibu Beach Party. Kim decides not to go hoping to avoid confrontation with Brandi. At the party, tension between Taylor and Camille reach a boiling point when Camille's friend D.D. defends Camille and Taylor goes off the deep end.
| 32 | 15 | "A Book, a Bachelorette and a Breakdown" | December 12, 2011 | 2.35 |
The women visit Las Vegas. Kim breaks down to Kyle, and Kyle shoots the cover for her new book.
| 33 | 16 | "Uninvited" | December 19, 2011 | 2.44 |
Kyle is stressed out while planning her white party. She and her husband consider turning Taylor and her husband Russell away from the party, after learning that Russell has threatened Camille with litigation. At the party, Kim confronts Brandi and the claws come out.
| 34 | 17 | "Leis and Lies in Lanai" | January 2, 2012 | 2.59 |
Kyle tries to get rid of the drama by trying to have fun at her White Party but the other women are still confused by Taylor. All the women except Taylor set out to Hawaii. But Kyle can't relax when Kim misses her first flight—then her second. At Mauricio's birthday dinner, Mauricio confronts Kim about lying too much. Lisa starts to grow closer to Brandi. Later, Taylor calls Lisa and Kyle from Beverly Hills to tell them that she and Russell are getting divorced.
| 35 | 18 | "A Day Late, An Apology Short" | January 9, 2012 | 2.50 |
Kim and her new boyfriend miss most of the activities in Hawaii, including their boat tour. Kyle argues with Kim over dinner. Dana confronts Taylor about her ruined marriage.
| 36 | 19 | "Night of a Thousand Surprises" | January 16, 2012 | 2.76 |
Lisa throws a party at her new restaurant SUR. Cedric returns and has a confrontation with Lisa. We meet a girl who was dating Brandi's ex-husband while they were still married, Paul's ex-girlfriend, a disheveled Kim breaks down and tells Kyle the truth about her boyfriend Ken, and Taylor tells the others the real story about her marriage.
| 37 | 20 | "The Real Wedding of Beverly Hills" | January 23, 2012 | 3.02 |
| 38 | 21 | "Reunion: Part 1" | January 30, 2012 | 2.85 |
Host Andy Cohen reflects on some of the season's most talked-about moments with the 90210 Housewives and the ladies discuss the dramatic confrontation between Camille and Taylor at the tea party; Adrienne's outrage over Lisa's "Maloof-hoof" comment; Kim's revelations to Kyle at the SUR party; and Brandi's outrageous accusations at Game Night.
| 39 | 22 | "Reunion: Part 2" | February 6, 2012 | 2.39 |
Housewife friend, Brandi Glanville, joins the cast to defend her controversial comments from the season; Taylor delves deeper into the secrets from her troubled relationship; and Camille dishes about the new man in her life.
| 40 | 23 | "Reunion: Part 3" | February 13, 2012 | 2.14 |
| 41 | 24 | "The Lost Footage" | February 16, 2012 | 1.00 |
