= Luann & Sonja: Welcome to Crappie Lake =

- Genre: Reality
- Starring: Luann de Lesseps; Sonja Morgan
- Country of origin: United States
- Original language: English
- No. of seasons: 1
- No. of episodes: 8

Production
- Executive producers: Jeff Jenkins; Russell Jay-Staglik; Ailee O'Neill; Brandon Beck; Ross Weintraub; Reinout Orelemans
- Camera setup: Multiple
- Running time: 22 minutes
- Production companies: Jeff Jenkins Productions; 3BMG

Original release
- Network: Bravo
- Release: July 9 – August 20, 2023

Related
- The Real Housewives of New York City

Luann & Sonja: Welcome to Crappie Lake is an American reality television series that premiered on Bravo on July 9, 2023. It follows Luann de Lesseps and Sonja Morgan as they are invited to Benton, Illinois to spruce up the town.

== Premise ==
Luann de Lesseps and Sonja Morgan are invited to Benton, Illinois to spruce up the town. Coming after the impacts of the COVID-19 pandemic, the Benton City Council asks them for help with tasks to revitalize Benton, such as constructing a new playground, upgrading the animal shelter, and hosting a variety show. Paula Abdul made cameo appearances. In the meantime, they also catch crappie at Rend Lake, attend the town's testicle festival, and go mudding in a monster truck.

== Episodes ==
| No. | Title | Original release date | U.S. viewers (millions) |
|---|---|---|---|
| 1 | "Welcome to Crappie Lake" | July 9, 2023 | 0.51 |
| 2 | "Let the Follies Begin" | July 9, 2023 | 0.41 |
| 3 | "Gone Muddin'" | July 16, 2023 | 0.38 |
| 4 | "The Belles of the Balls" | July 23, 2023 | 0.42 |
| 5 | "Taking Care of Business" | July 30, 2023 | 0.35 |
| 6 | "Creative Differences" | August 6, 2023 | 0.31 |
| 7 | "X-Mas in July" | August 13, 2023 | 0.30 |
| 8 | "The Grand Finale" | August 20, 2023 | 0.30 |

== Production ==
In July 2022, it was announced production had commenced on an untitled series revolving around Luann de Lesseps and Sonja Morgan. In October 2022, it was announced the series was titled Luann & Sonja: Welcome to Crappie Lake, with Jeff Jenkins serving as an executive producer. Jenkins stated that scenes involving fights between the women were removed from the final cut, stating, "...we just made the decision that we don’t need more quarrels. This is fun. This about heart and comedy and making things better..."

== Reception ==
Nina Metz, writing for the Chicago Tribune, gave the series 1.5 stars out of 4. She described the film as "disingenuous", saying, "A one-off reality TV series isn't going to generate the economic infusion Benton actually needs". She also criticized the show as unoriginal, saying the idea was taken directly from The Simple Life, and noted the title of the series was "a riff on Schitt's Creek". She also questioned the real impact of the projects Luann and Sonja completed, and described the show as "dull".

Cady Lang, writing for Time, praised the show for taking a new direction with the housewives, moving away from drama and fighting, and showing more friendship between the two women. She described it as a "a captivating comedic masterpiece". The Daily Beast's Coleman Spilde also praised the show, comparing it to The Simple Life. He described it as "blissfully assured good-time television", and further stated, "If Bravo plays its cards right [...] each new season could be the network's biggest sensation since Real Housewives proper".
