= Kelly Bensimon =

American model and real estate agent

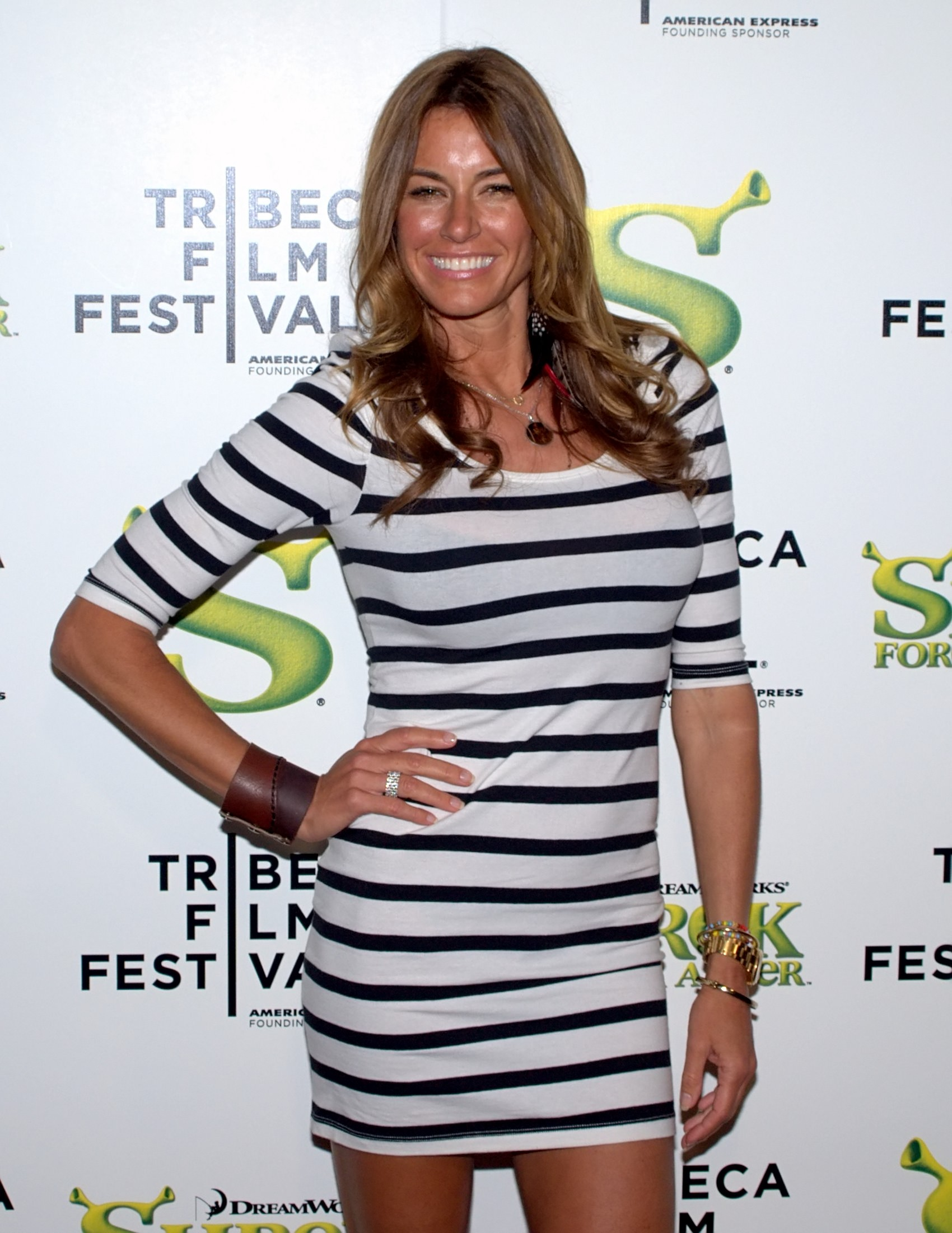
- Bensimon at the 2010 Tribeca Film Festival
- Born: Kelly Jean Killoren; May 1, 1968 (age 58); Rockford, Illinois, U.S.
- Education: Trinity College, Connecticut; Columbia University (BA); Northeastern University (MBA); New York University (MBA)
- Occupations: Model; television personality; real estate agent; writer
- Years active: 1983–present
- Height: 5 ft 10 in (178 cm)
- Spouse: Gilles Bensimon (m. 1997; div. 2007)
- Children: 2

Kelly Killoren Bensimon (born May 1, 1968) is an American real estate agent, television personality, and former model. Bensimon is best known for her appearance as a cast member on the Bravo television series The Real Housewives of New York City from seasons 2 to 4.

== Early life and education ==
Kelly Jean Killoren was born on May 1, 1968, in Rockford, Illinois. She graduated from Keith Country Day School, a college preparatory academy in Rockford, Illinois, before attending college. She attended Trinity College in Connecticut for a year before transferring to Columbia University's School of General Studies, graduating in 1998 with a degree in literature and writing. She completed an MBA with a focus on international marketing at Northeastern University in 2015. She later earned her Executive MBA in real estate and fashion from the New York University Stern School of Business.

== Career ==
Bensimon began her career as a model at 15, when she entered Elite Model Management's Look of the Year contest, where she came second to Cindy Crawford. At 16, she modeled for Ann Taylor, before becoming the face of French cosmetics company Clarins. She would be represented by Elite, Ford Models and IMG, and model for Spanish Vogue, Elle, Cosmopolitan, and Harper's Bazaar. In March 2010, she appeared on the cover of Playboy for the magazines March 2010 Issue, including a six-page pictorial, all of which were photographed by her ex-husband Gilles Bensimon. In September 2011, Bensimon was the cover of Shape and was featured in a pictorial based on her exercise routine.

She has worked as a host of various events including IMG fashion week, and of the IMG swim shows in Miami. She was a spokesperson in 2006 for Wool as part of their Test Marketing Productions (TMP). Bensimon hosted and modeled in menswear events with GQ magazine. She was also an "ambassador" for Spring 2007 Mercedes-Benz Fashion Week in New York City.

Killoren Bensimon has had several jewelry collections. Her first line of jewelry was sold exclusively at Barneys New York. Her second line of jewelry was sold at Bloomingdale's in fall 2007. On June 24, 2010, Killoren Bensimon announced the launch of her fourth jewelry collection, Kelly by Kelly Killoren Bensimon. The collection included mixed metals, leather, feathers, and crystals and was sold at Intermix stores across the U.S. to support Feeding America. For spring 2011, Bensimon's jewelry collection was sold at Wink, W Hotels, and Dash. She also sold a jewelry collection on HSN. In 2013, she launched a fragrance, In the Spirit of, and a candle line called Baiser Rose. In 2019, she launched an outerwear line called Enville by Pologeorgis.

Her television career most notably includes Bravo's The Real Housewives of New York City (seasons 2–4), which she joined in 2009 as a full cast member. She stirred controversy while on a cast trip to the island of Saint John, U.S. Virgin Islands, in the season 3 episode titled "Sun, Sand, and Psychosis" (dubbed "Scary Island" by fans of the show). Killoren Bensimon appeared on Bravo's Odd Mom Out in episodes 9 and 10 of season 2. She also appeared on WEtv's reality series Million Dollar Matchmaker. Killoren Bensimon co-starred in the fourth season of The Real Housewives Ultimate Girls Trip, a spin-off featuring various women from The Real Housewives franchise, which premiered in December 2023 on Peacock.

Killoren Bensimon has also worked as a writer, producing three books for Assouline Publishing: In the Spirit of the Hamptons (2 volumes), American Style, and The Bikini Book. A portion of the author's proceeds were donated to the Costume Institute of the Metropolitan Museum of Art. Her fourth book, I Can Make You Hot, was published by St. Martin's Press in April 2012. A portion of the author's proceeds were donated to Generositywater.org. In June 2016, Simon & Schuster published Bensimon's novel, A Dangerous Age. In August 2017, Killoren launched the sequel The Second Course, an odyssey about the food world.

She was a style columnist for the newspaper AM New York. She was also the editor-at-large for Hamptons Magazine, a free weekly with circulation of 40,000 to 50,000 and Gotham Magazine. Both publications are owned by Niche Media. She became the founding editor of Elle Accessories, but left after two issues.

After obtaining her real estate agent's license, Killoren joined Dolly Lenz Realty in New York in 2018. She moved to the Douglas Elliman real estate group in 2019. She has also made numerous appearances on Million Dollar Listing New York.

In February 2026, Killoren Bensimon was announced as a cast member in the E! reality television show The Golden Life. The series follows Killoren Bensimon as well as former Real Housewives alumni Ramona Singer, Luann de Lesseps, Sonja Morgan, and Dorinda Medley uniting in Palm Beach, Florida.

== Personal life ==
Killoren Bensimon was married to fashion photographer Gilles Bensimon until the couple divorced in 2007. They have two daughters, Sea Louise, born in 1998, and Thaddeus Ann, born in 2000. In August 2017, ten years after her divorce, Killoren Bensimon explained in a video that she would be dropping her ex-husband's last name, and would again be using the name Kelly Killoren.

On March 5, 2009, Killoren Bensimon was arrested on allegations of domestic violence and assault against her ex-boyfriend. Her ex-boyfriend alleged that she punched him in the face during an argument. Killoren Bensimon entered into a plea agreement with the State of New York, under which she was required to perform two days of community service.

== Bibliography ==
- Killoren Bensimon, Kelly (2002). In the Spirit of the Hamptons. Assouline Publishing.
- Killoren Bensimon, Kelly (2004). American Style. Assouline Publishing.
- Killoren Bensimon, Kelly (2006). The Bikini Book. Assouline Publishing.
- Killoren Bensimon, Kelly (2012). I Can Make You Hot!: The Supermodel Diet. St. Martin's Press.
- Killoren Bensimon, Kelly (2016). A Dangerous Age: A Novel. Simon & Schuster.
- Killoren Bensimon, Kelly (2017). The Second Course: A Novel. Gallery Books.
