= Gilles Bensimon =

French photographer (born 1944)

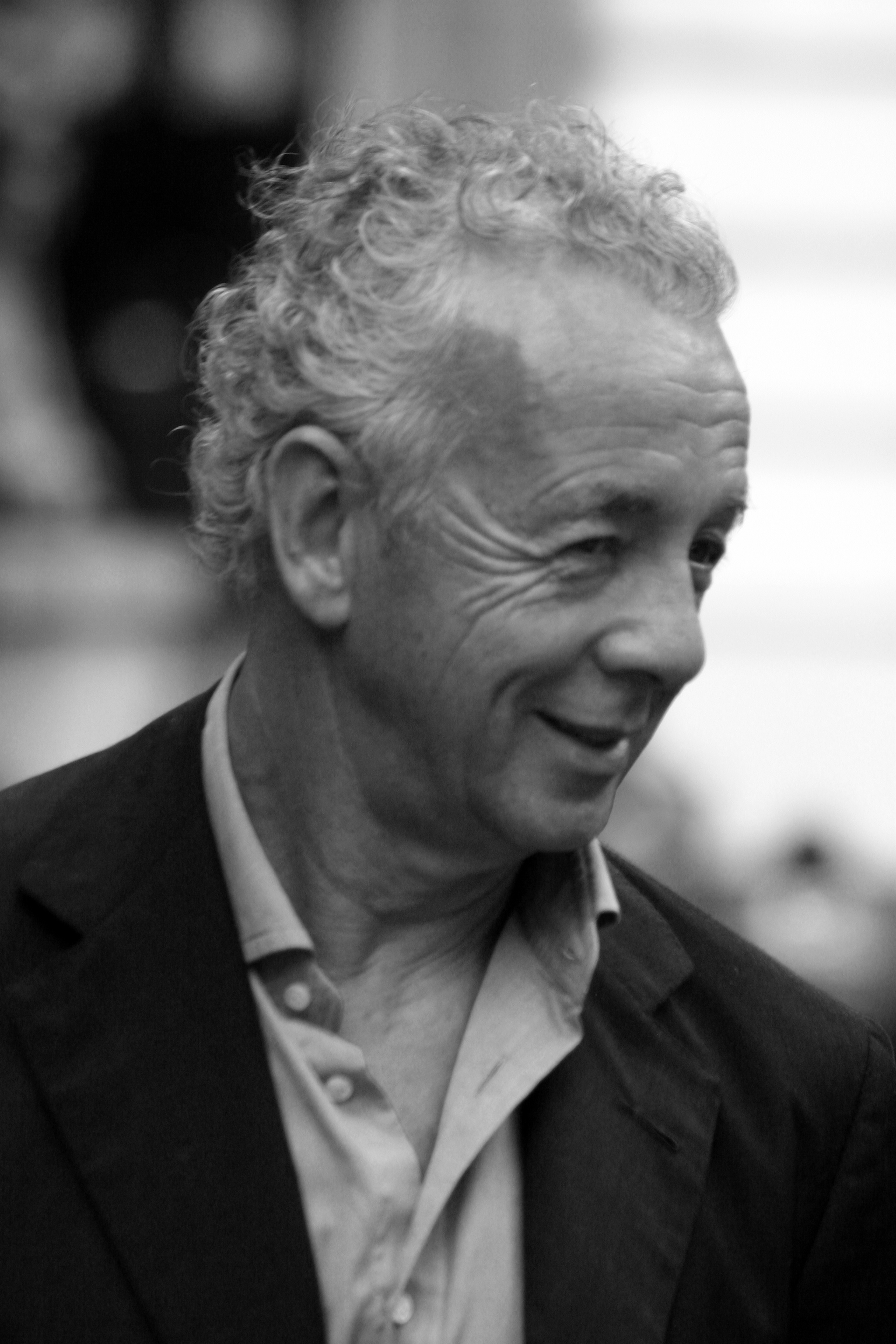
- Bensimon in 2007
- Born: Gilles Francis Simon Charles Bensimon; February 29, 1944 (age 82); Vic-sur-Cère, Cantal, France
- Occupation: fashion photographer
- Known for: International Creative Director of Elle magazine
- Spouses: Pacha (divorced) Elle Macpherson (m. 1986; div. 1989) Kelly Killoren (m. 1997; div. 2007)
- Children: 3

Gilles Francis Charles Bensimon (French: [ʒil bɛ̃simɔ̃]; born 29 February 1944) is a French fashion photographer and the former International Creative Director of Elle magazine. He has also been the photographer for the reality television series America's Next Top Model.

== Early life ==
Bensimon was born in Vic-sur-Cère in Cantal, France. He had advanced dyslexia, and his mother suggested that he pursue a career in art to better express himself. While living in Paris, he joined the French Elle magazine in 1967 and helped launch American Elle two years later. He photographed models such as Christy Turlington, Cindy Crawford and Naomi Campbell.

== Career ==
As the International Creative Director and Head Photographer for Elle magazine, Bensimon helped the publication reach a global audience of 20 million readers. He is known as a celebrity photographer, with a portfolio that includes leading models and celebrities such as Gisele Bündchen, Madonna, Beyoncé and Uma Thurman. He has also worked with cosmetic brands like Kohl's, Saks Fifth Avenue, Maybelline and Clarins.

== Personal life ==
Gilles Bensimon had a child with his first wife, Pacha. The marriage ended in divorce before a short-lived marriage to the Australian model Elle Macpherson. He married a third time in 1997 to Kelly Killoren. They had two children and the marriage ended in divorce in 2007.
