= Brandi Glanville =

American television personality (born 1972)

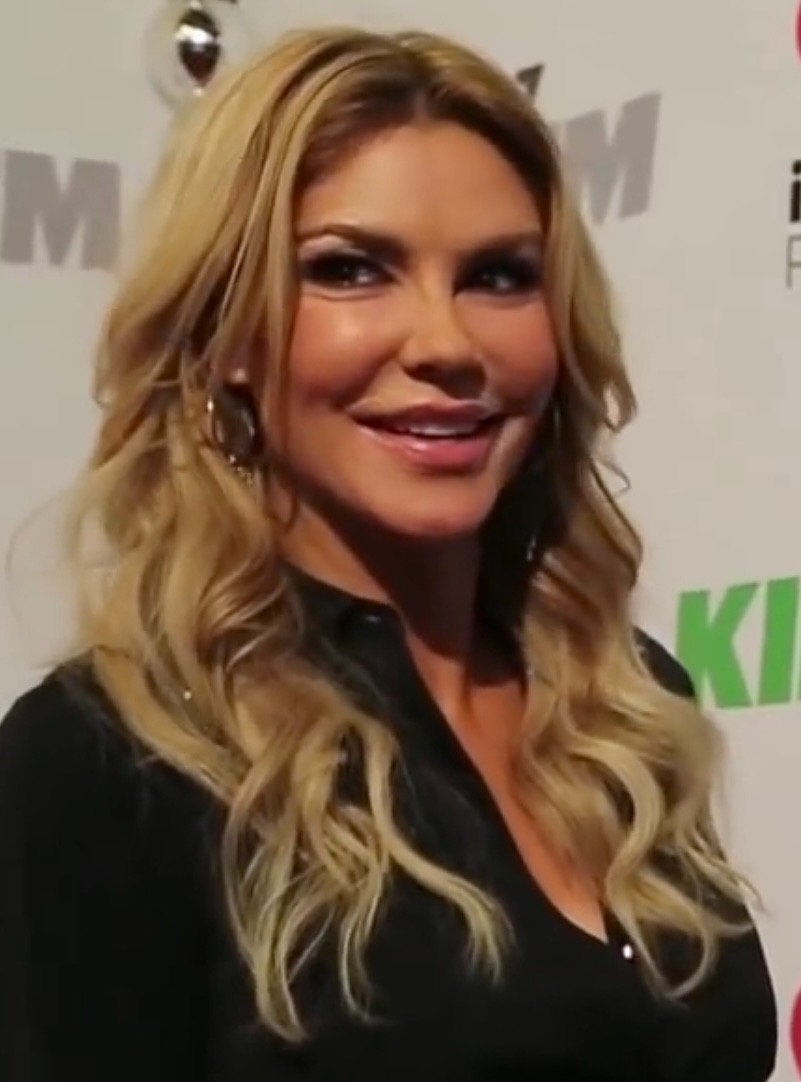
- Glanville in 2014
- Born: Brandi Lynn Glanville; November 16, 1972 (age 53); Salinas, California, U.S.
- Occupation: Television personality
- Years active: 1988–present
- Spouse: Eddie Cibrian (m. 2001; div. 2010)
- Children: 2
- Website: brandiglanville.com

Brandi Lynn Glanville (born November 16, 1972) is an American television personality and former model. She is best known for appearing on the reality television series The Real Housewives of Beverly Hills (2011–2016, 2019–2020), seasons two and five of The Real Housewives Ultimate Girls Trip (2022–2024).

She also hosts a podcast called Brandi Glanville Unfiltered and has appeared on The Celebrity Apprentice (2015), Famously Single (2016), both the British and American version of Celebrity Big Brother (2017; 2018), and My Kitchen Rules (2017). Glanville has released two books, Drinking and Tweeting: And Other Brandi Blunders (2013) and Drinking and Dating (2014), which became New York Times Best Sellers.

== Early life ==
Glanville was born in Salinas, California and raised in Sacramento, California as the middle child of Judith (née Swinehart) and Guy Glanville. She has stated that her father grew marijuana, which she would sell as she got older; on Celebrity Big Brother UK , she admitted that she (along with her siblings, older sister Tricia and younger brother Michael) had previously blackmailed her father in order to obtain money. Glanville’s father actually worked three main jobs to support the family, including at a grocery store and a gas station. Her mother worked as a housekeeper. Glanville attended Willow Rancho Baptist School and Gloria Dei Lutheran School and graduated from John F. Kennedy High School, Sacramento.

== Career ==
=== Fashion ===
At the age of 16, Glanville moved to Paris, France to begin modeling, after being signed to Elite Model Management. In addition to Paris, she worked in cities such as Hamburg, London, Los Angeles, Munich, New York and Tokyo. By the time she turned 18, she was walking in shows for Paris Fashion Week, among others. Glanville has appeared in several magazines, including Glamour, Cosmopolitan, NW and Beverly Hills Lifestyle Magazine. She appeared on the magazine cover of UK's The Times in January 2014.

Glanville has worked for well-known fashion brands and designers, including Valentino, Versace, Chanel, Giorgio Armani, and Gucci. She has also appeared in a commercial for Coors Light beer.

In December 2012, she launched a clothing line called "Brand B", which was sold exclusively on Amazon. Glanville's T-shirt line was launched in her official online store in 2014. The tops feature slogans such as "Medicated" and "It's Not Fun To Be Sober" and were priced between $25 and $30.

=== Television ===
In 2011, Glanville appeared on the second season of the Bravo reality series The Real Housewives of Beverly Hills. She joined the series in a recurring role referred to as a "friend of the housewives", making several appearances throughout the season including the reunion episode. She revealed to radio host Howard Stern that she made $18,000 as a part-time cast member during her first season on the show.

The following year, Glanville and Yolanda Hadid joined the cast as official housewives for the show's third season, Glanville becoming the first friend of the show to be cast as a full-time housewife. She was fired from the series after its fifth season in 2015. Glanville made random appearances in the future and appeared under “guest” capacities for the show's sixth, ninth and tenth seasons.

In 2013, she co-hosted an episode of CNN anchorman Anderson Cooper's talk show Anderson. In February 2013, she worked as a fashion correspondent and hosted the Academy Awards for ABC's On the Red Carpet. The same year, she acted as herself on The CW's teen drama series 90210, in the episode titled "Dude, Where's My Husband?", alongside Camille Grammer. She portrayed Erica in Lifetime's television film Missing at 17 (2013), Housewife Veronica in comedy film The Hungover Games (2014) and Tech Whitley in Syfy's disaster television film Sharknado: The 4th Awakens (2016).

In 2015, Glanville competed on the seventh season of The Celebrity Apprentice, where she was fired two weeks before the finale. In 2016, she appeared on the E! reality dating series Famously Single. In 2017, Glanville competed with Dean Sheremet on the FOX reality cooking series My Kitchen Rules, where they finished in third place. Later in 2017, she competed as a housemate on the twentieth season of the British reality series, Celebrity Big Brother UK, where she was the fourth housemate to be evicted from the show on Day 18. In 2018, Glanville appeared as a HouseGuest on the premiere season of the American version of Celebrity Big Brother, where she was the fifth person to be evicted on Day 24. She also appeared on the second season of Marriage Boot Camp: Reality Stars Family Edition with her father, Guy Glanville.

In 2022, Glanville (along with a mixture of housewives from different franchises) appeared on the second season of The Real Housewives Ultimate Girls Trip; the season was filmed in late 2021 at Dorinda Medley's Blue Stone Manor in The Berkshires, New England.

In 2023, Glanville was a contestant on Peacock's reality series The Traitors. However, she was absent from The Traitors reunion. Additionally, Bravo and Peacock confirmed that Glanville would be returning for the upcoming fifth season of The Real Housewives Ultimate Girls Trip, with other returning cast members Phaedra Parks, Vicki Gunvalson and Eva Marcille, initially set to premiere in 2024. Glanville was allegedly removed from filming after an altercation with original The Real Housewives of New Jersey alum Caroline Manzo. The sexual misconduct surrounding the alleged altercation lead the season being indefinitely shelved and never aired.

=== Books and writing ===
In February 2013, Glanville released a book with Leslie Bruce, Drinking and Tweeting: And Other Brandi Blunders. LA Weekly called the book "the best piece of celeb literature we've ever come across." People magazine also gave the book a positive review by writing: "Yet as crazy as she might come off here (and on TV), she's strangely relatable, like someone it would be really fun to have drinks with." Glanville's second book with Leslie Bruce, Drinking and Dating: P.S. Social Media Is Ruining Romance was published on February 11, 2014. The book focuses on her relationships and dating life as a single mother.

In 2014, Glanville wrote a weekly column for an Australian celebrity magazine NW.

=== Other ventures ===
Glanville is active on social media and endorses products such as beauty and wellness products on Instagram. She has partnered with several brands, including Hand MD Skincare hand care range, Lifeline Skin Care products, FabFitFun beauty subscription box, Teami Blends teas and Singles Swag subscription box. On November 4, 2013, Glanville began a weekly podcast show entitled Brandi Glanville Unfiltered. On the podcast Glanville discusses her life, popular culture, and holds interviews with various personalities.

Glanville's Sonoma County Chardonnay titled "Unfiltered Blonde" was launched in partnership with Rippey Wine Company in April 2015. The wine received a bronze medal in the Celebrity Wine Division at the 2015 Los Angeles International Wine Awards and was rated 90 points by Wine Enthusiast Magazine. She has also created an Android mobile application called Blunder Block.

On July 7, 2022, Glanville debuted her first single named "Life of a Housewife" under the name B-Geezy.

== Philanthropy ==
Glanville served as the celebrity grand marshal at the Sacramento Pride in June 2013. In July 2013, Glanville and Charitybuzz organized a charity project auctioning off a chance to spend an entire day with her, valued at $10,000. Proceeds from the auction benefited The Foundation For Living Beauty, which provides free services to help women with cancer and cancer survivors. She supported the David Foster Foundation Miracle Gala and Concert in Calgary on September 27, 2014.

She supports children's charity Make-a-Wish Foundation and chose the latter as her charity of choice when competing on Celebrity Apprentice. Through Celebrity Apprentice, she was able to secure a donation of $80,000 to the foundation. In December 2014, she promoted and encouraged the sales of Make-a-Wish Foundation's holiday cards on Facebook, Twitter and her official Bravo blog. In April 2015, she participated in Make-a-Wish Foundation's "Walk for Wishes" charity walk and had a personal goal of raising $15,000 for the organization. She received a Woman's Achievement Award from Associates for Breast and Prostate Cancer Studies based in California on May 6, 2015. In June 2017, Glanville participated in a bachelor auction with television personality Eden Sassoon. The event raised money for the breast cancer organization Susan G. Komen, as part of the Babes For Boobs charity event.

In March 2018, Glanville, Carole Radziwill and Teresa Giudice participated in "An Evening With Celebrity Housewives" charity event at The Ridgefield Playhouse. Proceeds from the event's meet and greet tickets benefited actress Mariska Hargitay's Joyful Heart Foundation.

== Personal life ==
In 2001, Glanville married actor Eddie Cibrian. Cibrian and Glanville have two sons, Mason and Jake. The couple announced their separation in July 2009 when it was revealed Cibrian had begun an affair with country music singer LeAnn Rimes, after they appeared together in the movie Northern Lights. Cibrian and Glanville's divorce was finalized on September 30, 2010. The circumstances surrounding the affair and divorce were a part of Glanville's book Drinking and Tweeting: And Other Brandi Blunders. In a 2013 interview, Glanville commented, "Marriages break up all the time. People have affairs. Happens every day. It matters how you handle yourself after and if you're actually remorseful. I've never found LeAnn to be remorseful. I found her to be like, 'Nah-nah-nah-nah-nah, I got your family.'" By 2018, Rimes and Glanville had made amends, with Glanville stating: "I think we both grew up quite a bit, and we both love Eddie's parents. We both love the kids, and Eddie's going to be in my life for the rest of my life. [...] We're like sister wives. It's me and LeAnn and Eddie."

In 2015, Glanville was sued by model and fellow Real Housewife Joanna Krupa for defamation related to comments made by Glanville on Watch What Happens Live. The lawsuit was settled in 2017 for $500,000.00, and Glanville issued a public apology to Krupa.

=== Allegations of sexual misconduct ===
In January 2023, People reported that Glanville gave her Ultimate Girls Trip co-star Caroline Manzo "unwanted kisses," which led to both her and Manzo exiting the show. In January 2024, Manzo filed a lawsuit against Bravo which alleged that around the time of the January 2023 incident, the network and its affiliated companies—Forest Productions, Warner Bros. Entertainment, NBCUniversal Media, Shed Media and Peacock TV— would "regularly ply the Real Housewives cast with alcohol, cause them to become severely intoxicated, and then direct, encourage and/or allow them to sexually harass other cast members because that is good for ratings." Though Glanville was not named as a defendant, the lawsuit alleged she not only gave Manzo unwanted kisses, but also touched her thigh and "forcibly fondled" her genitalia and breasts after confronting her in a bathroom. Though Glanville initially placed blame on the show's producers prior to the lawsuit being filed, the lawsuit also alleged that she in fact had a history of sexually harassing conduct even prior to being hired for Ultimate Girls Trip, and which Bravo and other NBCUniversal entities knew about. On Twitter in 2024, Glanville called Manzo "a lying, short red haired closeted old lesbian" [sic] and request she come out. Glanville denied ensuing accusations that she was trying to forcibly out Manzo, following up with: "She behaved the way she did in front of cameras on an incredibly popular show. She then decided it didn't fit her brand regardless of what it did to my life. Haters get fucked." [sic]

=== Physical and mental health ===
On April 10, 2025, Glanville stated on Tori Spelling's podcast MisSPELLING that she was contemplating suicide for six months following Manzo's 2023 allegations against her. In July 2023, Glanville was diagnosed with a stress-induced angioedema on her face. In December 2024, Glanville publicly stated on social media and in interviews with Entertainment Tonight and The US Sun she had lost five teeth from the angioedema, and had spent over $70,000 in having medical tests run (including treatment by Dr. Terry Dubrow), expressing her belief and uncited medical opinions she had been infected by a previously undiscovered species of human ectoparasite during filming of Real Housewives Ultimate Girls Trip in Morocco. Dr. Dubrow contested Glanville's claim of a parasite, stating to TMZ his belief it was "an infectious process or a foreign body reaction to something she's had injected," either bacterial or fungal in nature. In July 2025, Vicki Gunvalson attested that she too had contracted the same unsubstantiated parasite.

By the end of March 2025, Glanville stated she had been receiving better medical advice from her fans on social media than medical professionals. On August 3, 2025, Glanville posted a video to TikTok showcasing self-inflicted chemical burns on her face and arms from misapplication of Nair hair removal cream. Despite her injury, Glanville espoused Nair as "the fountain of youth" and a cheaper alternative to pills, chemical peels, or photorejuvenation, and treated her chemical burns holistically instead of seeking professional care. Glanville had also begun referring to the alleged parasite as "Caroline", derisively named after Manzo. Due to the lack of evidence of a parasite and Glanville's self-medication, some fans expressed concern that she was experiencing delusional parasitosis. In May 2026, Glanville reported that she believed she had acquired "sexually transmitted ringworm" in her throat after performing oral sex on a recent partner.

== Bibliography ==
- Drinking and Tweeting: And Other Brandi Blunders (2013) ISBN 978-1476707631
- Drinking and Dating: P.S. Social Media Is Ruining Romance (2014) ISBN 978-0062296313

== Filmography ==
Television and film roles
Year	Title	Role	Notes
2011–2015, 2019	The Real Housewives of Beverly Hills	Herself	95 episodes, Recurring (Season 2); Main cast (Seasons 3–5); Guest star (Seasons 6, 9–10)
2012	The Eric Andre Show	Herself	Episode "Brandi Glanville"
2013	Vanderpump Rules	Herself	2 episodes: "Tooth or Consequences" & "Rich People Annoy Me"
2013	Anderson	Herself / Co-Host	Episode: "Safe Haven Star Josh Duhamel and Julianne Hough/Co-Host Brandi Glanville/Money-Saving Secrets"
2013	90210	Herself	Episode: "Dude, Where's My Husband?"
2013	Missing at 17	Erica	Television film
2014	The Real Housewives of New York City	Herself	Episode: "Unhappy Anniversary"
2014	The Hungover Games	Housewife Veronica	Comedy film
2015	The Celebrity Apprentice 7	Herself	Contestant; 8 episodes; 5th
2016	Sharknado: The 4th Awakens	Tech Whitley	Television film
2016	Famously Single	Herself	8 episodes
2017	My Kitchen Rules	Herself	Contestant; 8 episodes
2017	Hollywood Medium	Herself	Episode: "Brandi Glanville/Joanna Garcia Swisher/Chuck Liddell/Tiffany Haddish"
2017	What Happens at the Abbey	Herself	Episode: "Welcome to the Abbey"
2017	Gay for Play Game Show Starring RuPaul	Herself	Episode: "Episode #1.10"
2017	Celebrity Big Brother 20	Herself	20 episodes; 11th
2018	Celebrity Big Brother 1	Herself	12 episodes; 7th
2018	Marriage Boot Camp: Reality Stars Family Edition	Herself	Season 12
2021	Family Reunion	Heidi	Episode: "Remember when Cocoa Was a Housewife?"
2022	The Real Housewives Ultimate Girls Trip	Herself	Season 2
2023	The Traitors	Herself	Season 1; 17th
2026	Special Forces: World's Toughest Test	Herself	Season 5; 1 episode
