= The Golden Life =

American reality television series

- Genre: Reality television
- Starring: Kelly Bensimon; Luann de Lesseps; Dorinda Medley; Sonja Morgan; Ramona Singer
- Country of origin: United States
- Original language: English
- No. of seasons: 1
- No. of episodes: 5

Production
- Executive producers: Mark Ford; Tara Long; Ben Mergarel; Nadine Rajabi
- Camera setup: Multiple
- Production company: Blink49 Studios

Original release
- Network: E!
- Release: October 20, 2026 – present

Related
- The Real Housewives of New York City; The Real Housewives of New Jersey

The Golden Life is a reality television series that follows former The Real Housewives of New York City cast members Kelly Bensimon, Luann de Lesseps, Dorinda Medley, Sonja Morgan, and Ramona Singer as they navigate their personal and professional lives in and around Palm Beach, Florida. The series documents the women as they reconnect after years of shared friendships and conflicts while balancing dating, family and career milestones within Palm Beach’s social scene. The series premiered on October 20, 2026.

== Cast ==
Cast member	Seasons
Cast member	1
LuAnn de Lesseps	Main
Kelly Killoren Bensimon	Main
Dorinda Medley	Main
Sonja Morgan	Main
Ramona Singer	Main
Recurring Cast Members
Candace Bushnell	Recurring
Margaret Josephs	Recurring

== Production ==
In February 2026, it was announced that several The Real Housewives of New York City alumni would appear in a new series produced by E!. Kelly Bensimon, Luann de Lesseps, Sonja Morgan, Ramona Singer, and Jill Zarin were announced to star, with the series to follow them as they navigate their "golden" years together in Palm Beach, Florida. Production was scheduled to begin in early 2026 for ten episodes. That same month, it was announced Zarin had been fired from the series, following her criticism concerning the Super Bowl LX halftime show and its headliner, Bad Bunny. Dorinda Medley was subsequently named as Zarin's replacement.

In July 2026, Versant announced that E! had ordered additional episodes to be produced. Along with the additional order, it was announced author Candace Bushnell and The Real Housewives of New Jersey cast member Margaret Josephs would appear as recurring guests, as production relocated from Palm Beach to the Hamptons.

== Broadcast ==
In the United States, the series premiered on October 20, 2026. It began streaming on Hulu beginning November 3, 2026, with the first two episodes available, and the remainder premiering several days after their E! premiere. In Canada, United Kingdom, Ireland, Australia, New Zealand, the Nordics, and Benelux, the series airs on Hayu.
