= Ramona Singer =

American reality show participant

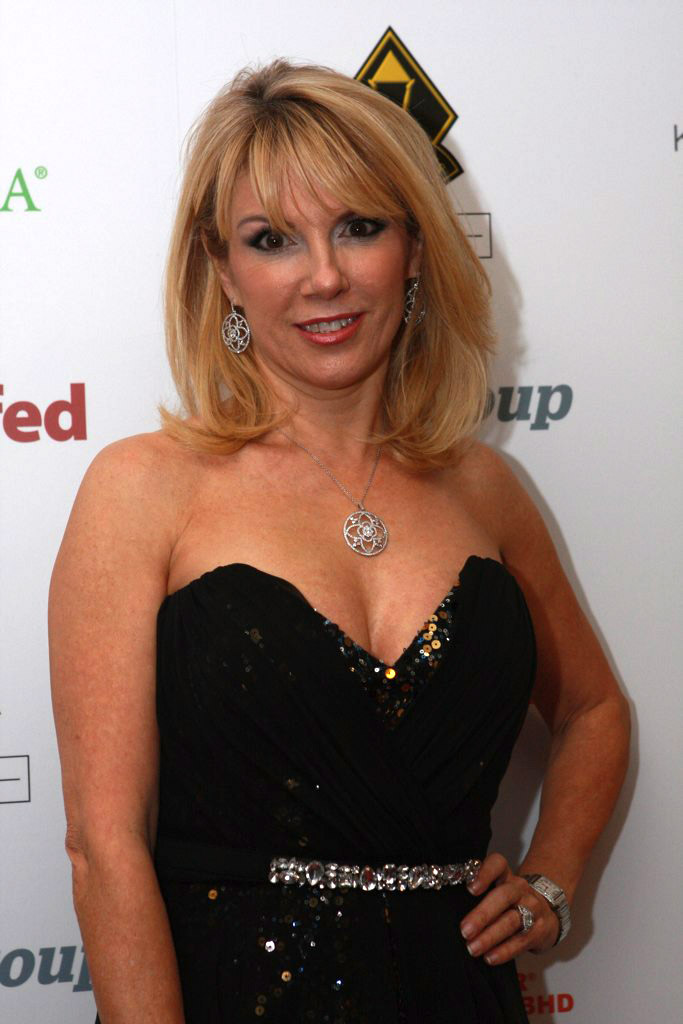
- Singer at the 2011 Stevie Awards
- Born: Ramona Mazur; November 18, 1956 (age 69); Rhinebeck, New York, U.S.
- Education: Fashion Institute of Technology (BS)
- Occupations: Television personality; businesswoman; author
- Known for: The Real Housewives of New York City
- Spouses: Howard Sobel (m. 1987; div. 19??); Mario Singer (m. 1992; div. 2016)
- Children: 1

Ramona Singer (née Mazur; born November 18, 1956) is an American television personality, businesswoman, and author. She is best known as a cast member on the Bravo reality television series The Real Housewives of New York City, in which she starred for the first thirteen seasons from 2008 to 2021.

== Early life ==
Ramona Singer was born on 18 November 1956, in Rhinebeck, New York, to parents Bohdan and Veronika Mazur, as the oldest of four children. She is of Ukrainian and Hungarian descent, through her father and mother, respectively. Singer studied marketing at the Fashion Institute of Technology, where she was the first female graduate from the four-year honors program.

== Career ==
After graduating college, Singer took part in a traineeship program at Macy's and later became a buyer for the department store chain. She also worked in sales management for the fashion companies Calvin Klein and French Connection. In 1986, Singer started her own wholesale clothing business RMS Fashions, Inc. Together with her former husband Mario Singer, she founded a jewelry company named True Faith Jewelry in 2005.

Singer joined as a cast member on the first season of Bravo's television show The Real Housewives of New York City (RHONY) in 2008. She remained on the show for thirteen seasons.

Between 2009 and 2010, Singer sold two jewelry collections on the HSN. In 2010, she also launched the skincare line Tru Renewal, which she relaunched as Ageless by Ramona in 2018. In 2011, Singer launched her pinot grigio wine, called Ramona Pinot Grigio. In 2012, she announced a red wine partnership with Opicio Wines, Ramona Red: Sangiovese Merlot Blend.

Singer's memoir Life on the Ramona Coaster was published in 2015 by Post Hill Press.

Singer starred in the first season of The Real Housewives Ultimate Girls Trip, a spin-off featuring various women from The Real Housewives franchise, that premiered on Peacock in November 2021. She starred on the fourth season of The Real Housewives Ultimate Girls Trip, which was released in December 2023.

In 2021, Singer also completed her real estate license and joined the Douglas Elliman real estate firm in New York City. In 2023, she was abruptly fired due to allegations made against her in a Vanity Fair article that she had made racist remarks during the filming of season 13 of RHONY, though Singer was ultimately cleared of wrongdoing by Bravo. Singer's thirteenth season, which aired in 2021, drew the lowest ratings in the show's history. In 2022, Bravo announced it would reboot RHONY with an entirely new cast, while simultaneously greenlighting a separate series featuring some of the original cast members. Behind-the-scenes tensions during and after the thirteenth season, including the allegations of racially insensitive comments by cast members during filming, contributed to the network's decision to move forward without any members of the original lineup.

In February 2026, Singer was announced as a cast member in the upcoming E! reality television series, The Golden Life. The series will follow Singer as well as former Real Housewives alumni Luann de Lesseps, Sonja Morgan, Kelly Bensimon, and Dorinda Medley uniting in Palm Beach, Florida.

== Personal life ==
Ramona Singer was previously married to prominent cosmetic dermatologist Dr. Howard Sobel in 1987.

She married Mario Singer in 1992 and they renewed their vows in 2010. They divorced in 2016 following her discovery of his affair, after almost 25 years of marriage. They have one daughter named Avery.

=== Charity work ===
Singer has raised funds for safe houses, shelters, and domestic violence and abuse charities, including Safe Horizon, for which she partnered with Encircle NYC to design a mother-daughter pendant necklace to directly benefit the organization. She has also contributed to children's education and global aid through her support of Africa Foundation, for which she traveled to Africa to visit schools and help with the construction of a school kitchen for children. She has furthermore worked with her former RHONY castmate Bethenny Frankel's charity BStrong by contributing to relief efforts for causes like crisis support for Puerto Rico and Ukraine and collecting professional clothing donations for women entering the workforce through Dress for Success.

== Bibliography ==
- Life on the Ramona Coaster. Post Hill Press. 2015.
