= Leah McSweeney =

American fashion designer and TV personality (born 1982)

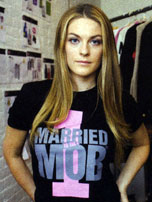
- McSweeney in 2009
- Born: Leah Christine McSweeney; August 27, 1982 (age 44); Manhattan, New York, U.S.
- Occupations: Television personality; fashion designer; entrepreneur; columnist; actress
- Years active: 2004–present
- Partner: Rob Cristofaro (2002–2008)
- Children: 1

Leah Christine McSweeney (born August 27, 1982) is an American television personality, fashion designer, and entrepreneur. She founded the women's streetwear line Married to the Mob in 2004 and co-starred on two seasons of the reality television series The Real Housewives of New York City from 2020 to 2021.

== Early life ==
McSweeney was born in Manhattan, New York, to Bryan and Bernadette "Bunny" McSweeney and raised in an Irish-Italian family. She attended the Convent of the Sacred Heart Catholic all-girls school on the Upper East Side. After being expelled at 15, her family moved to Newtown, Connecticut.

== Career ==
=== Married to the Mob ===
In 2004, McSweeney founded her clothing line, Married to the Mob (MTTM), which has collaborated with Kangol and Kaws. Married to the Mob would also collaborate with German accessory brand MCM, and French boutique Colette for a limited-edition Reebok lip-print sneaker. MTTM would later create another limited-edition sneaker with Nike. MTTM has also collaborated with French graffiti artist Fafi, Krink, and Jessy "Nite Rider" Kennedy. MTTM also released collections with models including Chanel West Coast, Kid Sister, Lil Debbie, and the Clermont twins.

=== Reality television and radio ===
In 2010, McSweeney appeared as a client on an episode on Bravo's The Millionaire Matchmaker. Her appearance on Matchmaker was well received by critics, and has led to appearances and cameos on other television programs, including VH1's Love & Hip Hop: New York.

In 2015, McSweeney became a featured recurring star on Shade 45's Lip Service with Angela Yee of Power 105.1. The following year, she began Improper Etiquette with Laura Stylez of Hot 97. On the podcast, McSweeney and Stylez provide candid perspectives and advice on lifestyle and current issues with occasional celebrity interviews.

McSweeney was confirmed to have joined The Real Housewives of New York City during an appearance at Bravo's "BravoCon" fan convention in November 2019. McSweeney was referred to production by former cast member Bethenny Frankel, who left the series after the previous season.

McSweeney officially signed on for her second season as a full-time cast member of The Real Housewives of New York City. McSweeney held off on renewing her contract until she was offered a higher salary, being paid only $3,000 an episode during her season 12 stint. For season 13, she reportedly made $7,800 an episode.

In March 2023, McSweeney starred in the third season of The Real Housewives Ultimate Girls Trip on Peacock and was paid $250,000 for the season.

==== Lawsuit against Bravo ====
McSweeney filed a federal lawsuit in Manhattan against NBCUniversal, Bravo, Andy Cohen, and several production companies associated with The Real Housewives of New York City. The complaint alleged that cocaine use was common on set and that producers had created a hostile work environment. McSweeney also claimed she faced retaliation after raising concerns about conditions during production. Cohen called allegations "false." In March 2026, District Judge Lewis J. Liman ruled the case will proceed in a public courtroom.

=== Writing and podcast ===
McSweeney has been a frequent contributor to the online publication Hypebeast, where she offers commentary on wellness, streetwear style, and motherhood. She also writes an advice column for Penthouse magazine.

On June 27, 2018, McSweeney wrote a controversial article for Penthouse titled Can We Talk About Toxic Femininity?, in which she criticized Rose McGowan and Asia Argento and accused them of using the #MeToo movement for personal gain. McSweeney received wide backlash and praise alike for her op-ed piece.

On December 10, 2018, McSweeney co-wrote an investigative article about antisemitism and corruption within the Women's March organization for Tablet magazine titled "Is The Women's March Melting Down?"

In April 2022, McSweeney published a book titled Chaos Theory, about her experiences including overcoming addiction, creating a streetwear brand, and entering the reality television space.

In March 2023, McSweeney launched a podcast on YouTube and other platforms called The Leah McSweeney Show. She has interviewed individuals such as model Teddy Quinlivan, publicist Kelly Cutrone, Fox News' Gutfeld! panelist Kat Timpf, and 2024 Democratic presidential candidate Marianne Williamson, the latter of whom she endorsed.

== Personal life ==
In 2002, McSweeney suffered several injuries in a physical altercation with the New York Police Department. She, along with streetwear designer and boyfriend Rob Cristofaro, used her $75,000 settlement to create Married to the Mob, a line of feminine streetwear.

McSweeney gave birth to her only child with Rob Cristofaro, daughter Kier Marie, in 2007.

McSweeney converted to Judaism in March 2022.

== Filmography ==
Film
Year	Title	Role
2023	The Kill Room	Alisha

Television
Year	Title	Notes	Ref.
2010	The Millionaire Matchmaker	"Opposites Don't Attract" (season 4, episode 7)	
2013	Celebrity Page	Season 7, episode 126	
2015	Love & Hip Hop: New York	"Call Your Bluff" (season 5, episode 9)	
2020–21	The Real Housewives of New York City	Main cast member (seasons 12-13)	
2020	Watch What Happens Live with Andy Cohen	Season 17, episode 70	
2023	The Real Housewives Ultimate Girls Trip	Main cast member (season 3)	
2023	The Other Two	Self/Hottie #1 (season 3)	

== Bibliography ==
- Chaos Theory: Finding Meaning in the Madness, One Bad Decision at a Time – A Candid Story of Addiction, Sobriety, and Unconventional Entrepreneurship. Harper Wave. 2022.

== See also ==
- List of American fashion designers
- List of fashion topics
