= Taylor Armstrong =

American television personality (born 1971)

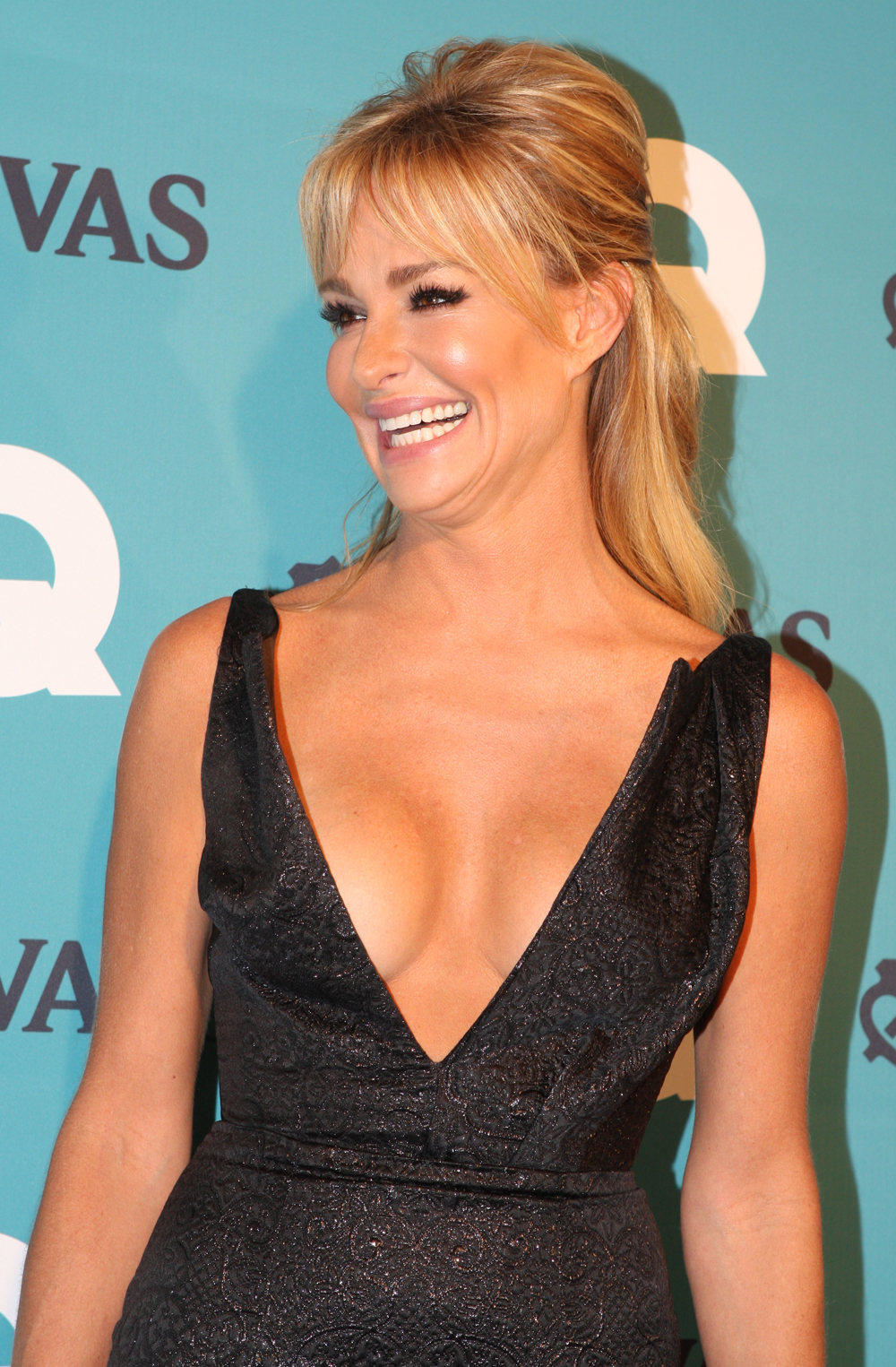
- Armstrong in 2012
- Born: Shana Lynette Hughes; June 10, 1971 (age 55); Independence, Kansas, U.S.
- Other names: Shana Taylor, Shana Ford, Taylor Ford
- Occupation: Television personality
- Years active: 2008–present
- Television: The Real Housewives of Beverly Hills and Orange County; Couples Therapy
- Spouses: Russell Armstrong (m. 2005; died 2011) John Bluher (m. 2014)
- Children: 1

Taylor Armstrong (born Shana Lynette Hughes; June 10, 1971) is an American television personality and advocate. She is known as an original cast member of the Bravo reality series The Real Housewives of Beverly Hills. In 2022, it was announced that she would join The Real Housewives of Orange County, making her the first American housewife to transfer franchises.

After starring in the show's first three seasons from 2010 until 2013, Armstrong continued to make guest appearances on the Beverly Hills installment between 2013 and 2016. In June 2022, Armstrong starred in the second season of The Real Housewives Ultimate Girls Trip.

== Early life ==
Armstrong was born Shana Lynette Hughes in Independence, Kansas, on June 10, 1971. Her family later left Kansas for Tulsa, Oklahoma, where Armstrong attended Union High School and was a cheerleader, later graduating in 1989.

== Career ==
Upon her relocation to California, she changed her name to Taylor Ford and started her own e-commerce business.

In 2010, Armstrong was approached by television producers who were interested in having her star of their upcoming reality show, The Real Housewives of Beverly Hills, through her friendship with Adrienne Maloof. She would appear in a main capacity for the show's first three seasons before departing in 2013.

In February 2012, Armstrong published her memoir with Gallery Books entitled Hiding from Reality: My Story of Love, Loss, and Finding the Courage Within. The memoir, which recounts childhood trauma, marital domestic abuse, and the aftermath of her husband's death, later became a New York Times Best Seller.

After the death of her husband in 2011, Armstrong has become an advocate against domestic abuse, giving speeches at the National Coalition Against Domestic Violence convention, Pennsylvania State University, and Northwestern University.

In 2014, Armstrong joined the cast of the fourth season of VH1's Couples Therapy, alongside her husband, John.

In June 2022, Armstrong starred in season two of The Real Housewives Ultimate Girls Trip, which premiered on Peacock. Filming was completed in September 2021 at Dorinda Medley's Blue Stone Manor in The Berkshires. On August 1, 2022, it was announced that Armstrong would be joining The Real Housewives of Orange County as a "friend of the housewives" for the seventeenth season, making her the first American housewife to switch franchises. On November 29, 2023, it was revealed that Armstrong would not be returning to The Real Housewives of Orange County, after only one season.

=== Internet meme ===
In 2019, a screen-capture of Armstrong on the second season of The Real Housewives of Beverly Hills was used in an Internet meme called "woman yelling at a cat". The meme depicts an upset Armstrong during a heated discussion about her husband's abuse juxtaposed with a photograph of a cat named Smudge. Armstrong reacted positively to the meme. She also talked about her relationship with her ex-husband.

== Personal life ==
Taylor met venture capitalist Russell Armstrong at a local restaurant in Beverly Hills while waiting to be seated. The two married less than a year later, and in 2006, Armstrong gave birth to their only child; a daughter named Kennedy Caroline Armstrong.

During the filming of the second season of The Real Housewives of Beverly Hills, Armstrong's marriage was plagued by rumors of financial issues and domestic violence. She later confirmed that she had been physically abused by Russell and had to undergo reconstructive surgery for an orbital fracture after being hit by him.

In July 2011, after filming for the second season concluded, Taylor filed for divorce, citing verbal and physical abuse. The following month in August, Russell Armstrong died by suicide by hanging. Armstrong found his body herself on August 15, 2011, at a home he rented on Mulholland Drive following their separation.

Armstrong married John Bluher, an attorney, on April 4, 2014, in Pacific Palisades, Los Angeles.

Armstrong came out as bisexual on an episode of The Real Housewives of Orange County on June 28, 2023, and mentioned in that episode that she had been in a five-year relationship with a woman before she was married to Russell.

== Filmography ==
Year	Title	Notes
2008	The Hills	Cameo; Episode: "When Lauren's Away..."
2010–2016	The Real Housewives of Beverly Hills	Series regular (Seasons 1–3) Guest (Seasons 4–6)
2014	Couples Therapy	Main cast (Season 4)
2022	The Real Housewives Ultimate Girls Trip	Main cast (Season 2)
2023	The Real Housewives of Orange County	Recurring cast (Season 17)

== See also ==
- List of people from California
- List of people from Kansas
- List of people from Tulsa, Oklahoma
