= Vicki Gunvalson =

American reality television personality and businesswoman

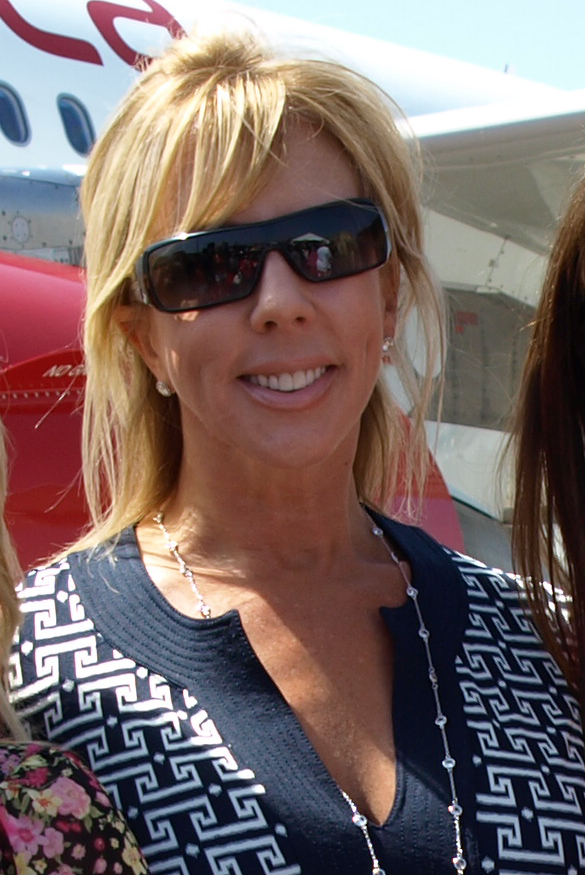
- Vicki Gunvalson in 2009
- Born: Victoria L. Steinmetz; March 27, 1962 (age 64); Mount Prospect, Illinois, U.S.
- Occupations: Television personality, entrepreneur
- Known for: The Real Housewives of Orange County
- Spouses: Michael J. Wolfsmith (m. 1982; div. 1991); Donn Gunvalson (m. 1994; div. 2014)
- Partners: Brooks Ayers (2012–2015); Steve Lodge (2016–2021)
- Children: 2
- Website: www.vickigunvalson.com

Victoria Gunvalson (née Steinmetz; formerly Wolfsmith; born March 27, 1962) is an American reality television personality and businesswoman. She is an original cast member of the Bravo reality television series The Real Housewives of Orange County (RHOC), appearing in 17 of the 20 seasons since its 2006 premiere. She is the founder and CEO of Coto Insurance.

== Career ==
Gunvalson is one of the original cast members of Bravo's reality television show The Real Housewives of Orange County. She appeared on the show from its debut and remained a full-time cast member for the first thirteen seasons. She was then demoted to a “friend of the Housewives” role for season 14 before departing the franchise entirely in January 2020. She later returned in a guest capacity during season 17 and in season 18. In November 2025, it was announced that she would return as a full-time cast member for the show’s 20th season.

In June 2022, Gunvalson starred in the second season of The Real Housewives Ultimate Girls Trip, a spin-off with various women from The Real Housewives franchise, which premiered on Peacock.

She was part of The Real Housewives Ultimate Girls Trip:Morocco (season four) cast, but due to disruptive filming, the season remains unaired.

In 2026, Gunvalson filmed as part of the main cast for The Real Housewives Ultimate Girls Trip:Roaring 20's (season five), which celebrated twenty years of Housewives.

In 2020, she hosted a podcast titled Whoop It Up with Vicki. In 2025, she co-hosts a podcast with Christian Gray Snow titled My Friend, My Soulmate, My Podcast with the Hurrdat Media Network.

Gunvalson owns an insurance agency in Coto de Caza, California.

== Personal life ==
Gunvalson is one of five children. Her father owned a construction company, and her mother was a housewife. According to Bravo, when Gunvalson was 5 years old, she underwent surgery to remove a benign inner-ear tumor called cholesteatoma, losing 50% of her hearing in her right ear. By the time she was 25 she had undergone five further surgeries and completely lost hearing in her right ear. When she was 32, the tumor had grown back and wrapped around the facial nerve, pierced through her skull and started creeping up towards the right side of her brain. She fully recovered from one last risky surgery, but did not recover hearing in her right ear.

She married her first husband Michael J. Wolfsmith at the age of 21, and they had two children. At the age of 29, they divorced and she began a part-time job at her father's construction company.

In 1991, after her father's death from Alzheimer's disease, she joined the health insurance business. In 1994, she married Donn Gunvalson and founded Coto Insurance and Financial Services, after obtaining her insurance license in California. Vicki and Donn divorced in 2014.

During the tenth season of The Real Housewives of Orange County in 2015, Gunvalson dated Brooks Ayers. It was revealed that Ayers' claim that he had cancer, which was a storyline throughout the season, was untrue, and that Gunvalson had been conned. Ayers admitted that he had fabricated the documents "to 'prove' to the world that I, in fact, have cancer."

Vicki was engaged to Steve Lodge, brother of Roger Lodge, from April 2019 until September 2021.

In November 2021, Gunvalson revealed that she had recently had cancer.

== Filmography ==
Television roles
Year	Title	Role	Notes
2006–2019, 2023–2024, 2026	The Real Housewives of Orange County	Herself	250 episodes: Main Cast: Seasons 1-13, 20, Friend: Season 14, Guest: Seasons 17–18
2009	Dr. Phil	Herself	
2010	Who Wants to Be a Millionaire	Herself	Celebrity Question Presenter; Episode: "The Real Housewives of Millionaire 2"
2013	Tamra's OC Wedding	Herself	Episodes: "Decisions Decisions" and "Tamra and Eddie's Wedding Kick Off"
2015	The Doctors	Herself	Episode: "The Doctors Exclusive: Honey Boo Boo's Health Intervention/Real Housewive Reconnects with Deceased Mother"
2022, 2026	The Real Housewives Ultimate Girls Trip	Herself	Main Cast: Seasons 2 & 5

== See also ==
- Andale's Restaurant & Bar, Puerto Vallarta
