= Dorinda Medley =

American socialite and television personality (born 1964)

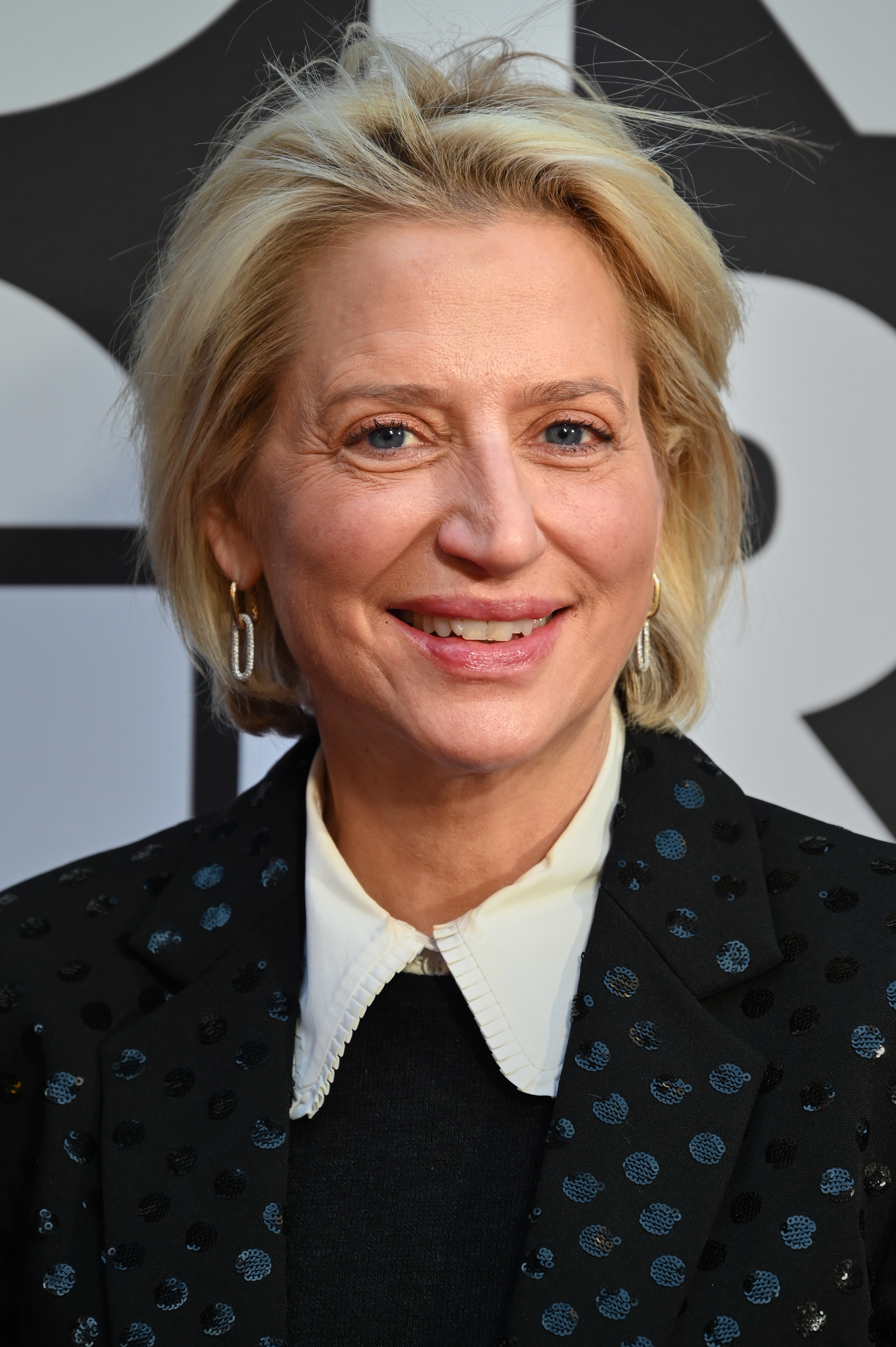
- Medley in 2025
- Born: Dorinda Cinkala; December 13, 1964 (age 61); Great Barrington, Massachusetts, U.S.
- Education: Franklin & Marshall College
- Occupations: Television personality; entrepreneur; author
- Spouses: Ralph Lynch (m. 1995; div. 2005) Richard H. Medley (m. 2005; died 2011)
- Children: 1

Dorinda Medley (née Cinkala; born December 13, 1964) is an American television personality and author. She is best known as a cast member on the Bravo reality television series The Real Housewives of New York City, in which she starred from 2015 to 2020.

== Early life ==
Medley was born in Great Barrington, Massachusetts, to John and Diane Cinkala. She graduated from Berkshire School in 1983 and Franklin & Marshall College in 1986.

== Career ==
After college, Medley began working at Liz Claiborne in Manhattan. She later moved to London and launched a cashmere brand, DCL Cashmere. In 2015, she joined the American reality television show The Real Housewives of New York City. She remained on the show for six seasons, from 2015 to 2020. In 2021, she published a memoir titled Make It Nice.

In 2022 and 2023, she starred in the second and fourth seasons of The Real Housewives Ultimate Girls Trip.

In 2024, it was announced that she would compete in the third season of The Traitors. In episode 2, she was the first person to be "murdered" by the Traitors and therefore the first candidate eliminated from the competition. In June 2025, she was revealed to be returning for the series' fourth season where she was "murdered" in episode 9, so she finished in 10th place.

In November 2025, she appeared on Celebrity Weakest Link.

In February 2026, E! announced Medley would be appearing on The Golden Life alongside former The Real Housewives of New York City cast members. The show will feature the women navigating their personal and professional lives in Palm Beach, Florida.

In March 2026, she announced her second book to be published with Simon & Schuster, titled I Know a Thing or Two About a Thing or Two, set to release in November 2026.

== Personal life ==
While working in New York City, Medley met her first husband, Ralph Lynch. They had one child, a daughter named Hannah. Medley married Richard Medley, a hedge fund advisor, in 2005; he died in 2011 at the age of 60. She dated entrepreneur John Mahdessian for seven years, separating in September 2019.

== Bibliography ==
- Medley, Dorinda (August 17, 2021). Make It Nice. Gallery Books. ISBN 978-1982168322.
- Medley, Dorinda (November 3, 2026). I Know a Thing or Two About a Thing or Two. Simon & Schuster. ISBN 978-1668222515.
