= The Real Housewives of New York City season 7 =

Season of television series

The Real Housewives of New York City
- Season 7
- Cover used by iTunes (Left to right) Thomson, Singer, Taekman, de Lesseps, Frankel, Medley, Radziwill and Morgan
- Starring: Bethenny Frankel; Luann de Lesseps; Ramona Singer; Sonja Morgan; Carole Radziwill; Heather Thomson; Kristen Taekman; Dorinda Medley
- No. of episodes: 23

Release
- Original network: Bravo
- Original release: April 7 – September 3, 2015

Season chronology
- ← Previous; Season 6 Next → Season 8

The seventh season of The Real Housewives of New York City, an American reality television series, is broadcast on Bravo. It aired April 7, 2015 until September 3, 2015, and is primarily filmed in New York City, New York. Its executive producers are Andrew Hoegl, Barrie Bernstein, Lisa Shannon, Pam Healy and Andy Cohen.

The Real Housewives of New York City focuses on the lives of Bethenny Frankel, Luann de Lesseps, Ramona Singer, Sonja Morgan, Carole Radziwill, Heather Thomson, Kristen Taekman and Dorinda Medley. It consisted of 23 episodes.

This season marked the final regular appearances of Heather Thomson and Kristen Taekman.

== Production and crew ==
It was announced that The Real Housewives of New York City was renewed for a seventh season on October 20, 2014 when it was revealed that former housewife, Bethenny Frankel, would be returning to the series. In March 2015, the full cast, trailer and premiere date for season seven were announced.

The season premiere "The B Is Back" was aired on April 7, 2015, while the nineteenth episode "New Beginnings, My Ass" served as the season finale, and was aired on August 11, 2015. It was followed by a three-part reunion that aired on August 18, August 25 and August 27, 2015, and a "Secrets Revealed" episode on September 3, 2015, which marked the conclusion of the season. Andrew Hoegl, Barrie Bernstein, Lisa Shannon, Pam Healy and Andy Cohen are recognized as the series' executive producers; it is produced by Ricochet and is distributed by Shed Media.

Following the final episode of the season, "Secrets Revealed", a special was aired on Watch What Happens Live titled "100th Episode Watch What Happens Live Special". The special was hosted by Andy Cohen with many housewives, past and present, returning to discuss the series, the drama that occurred and how it affected their lives. Jill Zarin declined to participate in the special, but appeared on her own during an episode of Watch What Happens Live the following month in October, 2015. Zarin was shown footage of the special and spoke on her feud with Frankel.

== Cast and synopsis ==
=== Cast ===
Five of the six wives featured on the sixth season returned for the seventh. It was revealed that Aviva Drescher had been fired from the series, shortly after the conclusion of season six. Andy Cohen later spoke of the firing of Drescher on a segment called Ask Andy, saying "I think that that was a situation where we listened to the fans."

De Lesseps returned to being a full-time cast member after recurring in season six.

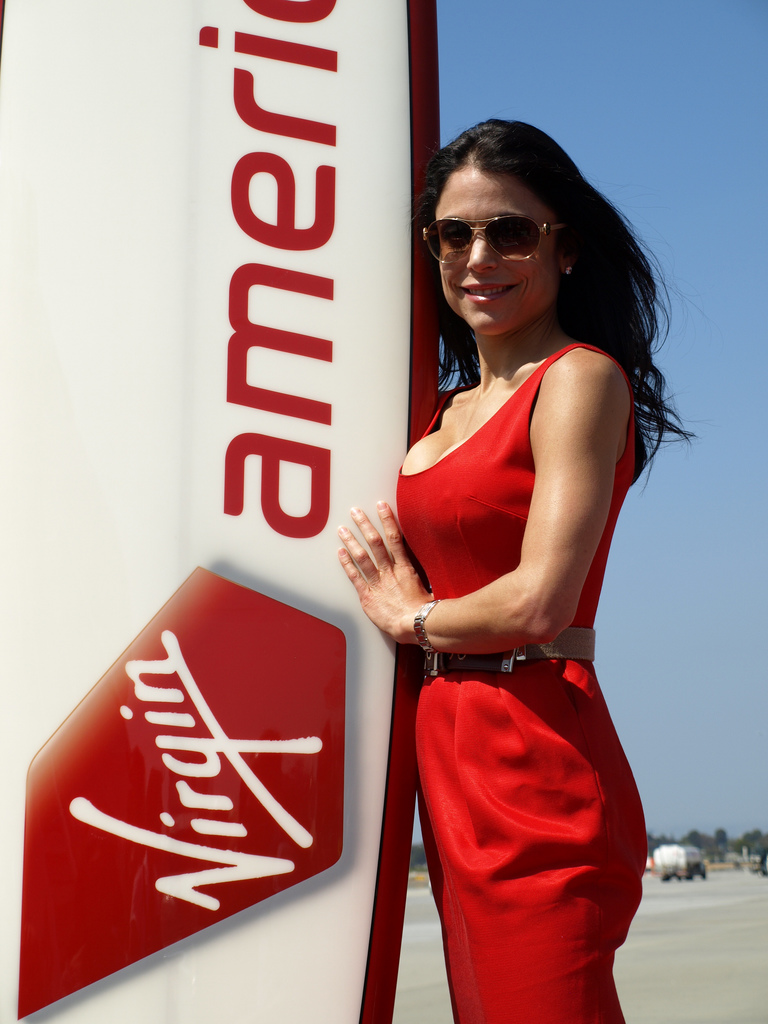
Season seven marks the return of Bethenny Frankel

Shortly after reports circulated on Bethenny Frankel's return to the series, on October 1, 2014 Frankel revealed to SiriusXM Radio host, Jennifer Hutt, that she was working with Andy Cohen on two different projects as well as revealing that Bravo have been asking her to return for years. October 2014, it was announced that Bethenny Frankel was returning to the series in season seven after a three-year hiatus from the series. Frankel returned to the series despite claiming she had quit reality television for her talk show Bethenny and that she wouldn't return to 'The Real Housewives of New York City. Frankel stated that she was excited for her return, saying "It feels like the first season when it was fresh and new and unknown."

Cohen later spoke of how he convinced Frankel to return during one if his Ask Andy videos, relaying the story he said, "The thing transpired in her kitchen...I went over there to convince her to come back to the show and she had different ideas about things she wanted to do...I kind of said, 'I don't think that those are good ideas.'" Continuing he then proceed to convince her with his reasons for her return and after a few more talks between the two, Frankel agreed with saying, "I'm in." With the return of de Lesseps and Frankel, Ramona Singer was no longer the only remaining original cast member.

A new cast member was also introduced the seventh season, Dorinda Medley. With the addition of Medley, the returning wives from season six; Singer, Sonja Morgan, Heather Thomson, Carole Radziwill and Kristen Taekman, and the wives returning to the series; de Lesseps and Frankel, this marked the first time in The Real Housewives franchise that there were eight full-time cast members.

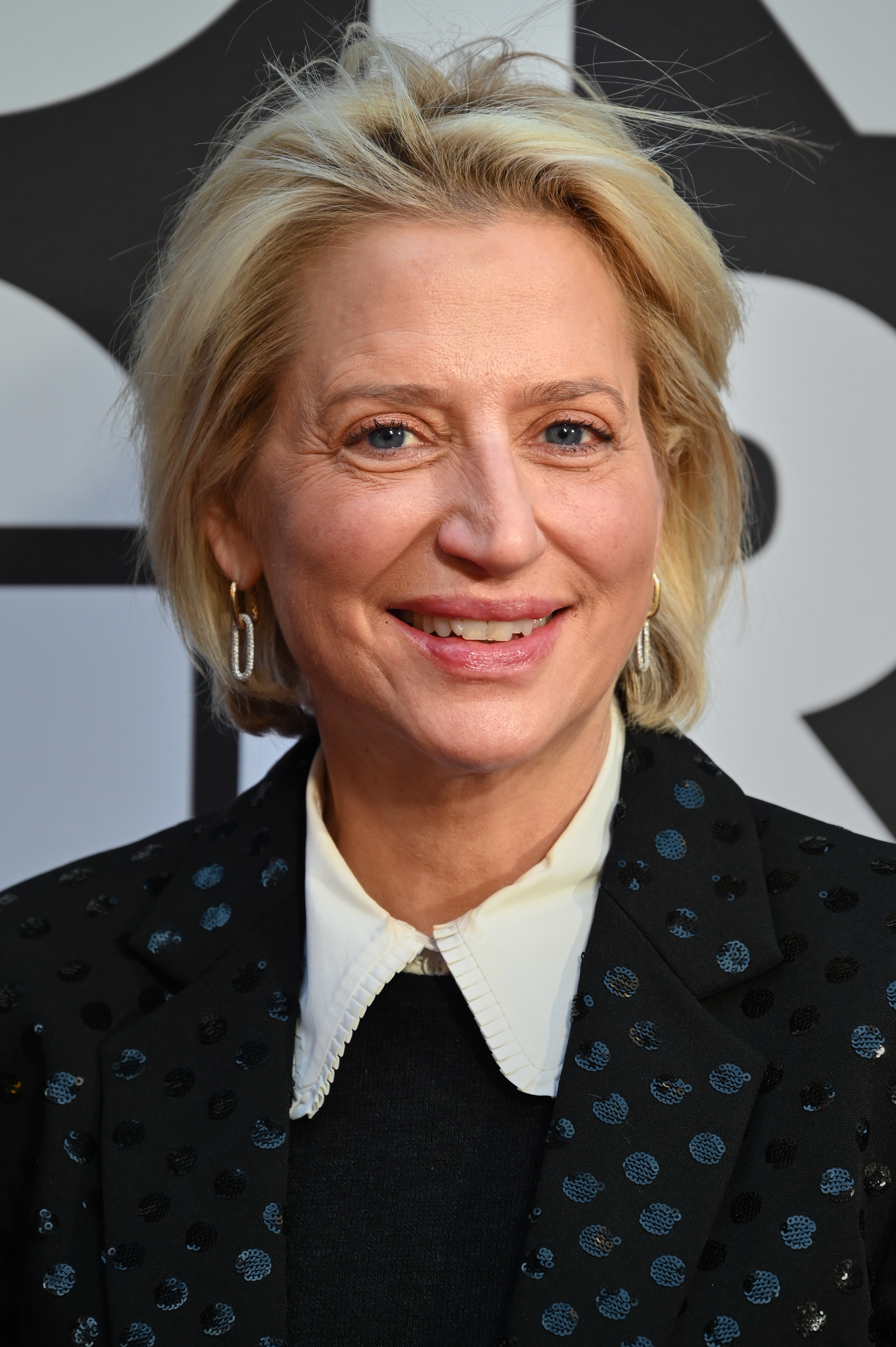
Season seven addition Dorinda Medley

Medley returned to New York, after spending over a decade in London running her and her former husband's cashmere company, DCL Cashmere. She and her daughter Hannah returned after the divorce, Medley navigated life in New York as a single mother. Medley eventually met a man named Richard Medley, they fell in love and married and together they raised money for charitable causes. Medley was devastated by the passing of Richard in 2011. After her and daughter found strength from their loved ones, Medley climbed the social ladder in New York. At the height of her social status, Medley met her current boyfriend, John Mahdessian who is owner of New York's legendary couture restoration house, Madame Paulette. Medley is described as being known for her "trademark sequins, humor and exuberant perspective" as well as "there's never enough glitz, glam and sparkle for this true New York City Housewife."

=== Synopsis ===
The season begins with the introduction of Bethenny Frankel, revealing her new transition in life. Frankel continues to go through a chaotic divorce, and left homeless from it. Frankel looks for a place to live and a place to belong. Luann de Lesseps begins the season after changing her name from "LuAnn" and is relishing in her new home in the Hamptons and invites the ladies to see it during a party. Ramona Singer copes with her divorce from Mario and tries to navigate life as a single woman. Carole Radziwill continues her work as an author as she is pressured by a deadline. Introduced is Dorinda Medley, Medleys struggles to live to separate lives- one with her Daughter Hannah and the other with her boyfriend John.

Kristen Taekman finds herself not invited to Frankel's last minute birthday party and isn't happy about it. Taekman attempts to resolve her issues on the night of the launch of Singer's sports bar but Frankel is uninterested. Taekman continues with her fashion blog and has a photo shoot in the streets for it. Taekman expands her realm of fashion when she takes part in a new nail polish line. Her new nail polish line, Pop of Color, is featured during fashion week as a part of the Elie Tahari presentation.

Heather Thomson attends a lunch between de Lesseps and Frankel, but it appears that Thomson and Frankel are both opinionated. The two women find themselves in a heated discussion of a war of words at Frankel's birthday dinner. The tension between the two women escalates after Bethenny surprisingly attends Medley's birthday in the Berkshires and Thomson is quick to fix a situation. In Turks and Caicos, tensions arise when Thomson thinks Frankel is a know-it-all.

Sonja Morgan meets Frankel after Frankel is warned by the other ladies of her questionable business aspirations and later in Atlantic City Frankel accuses Morgan of not listening and leaves her in tears. Morgan defends herself and her actions after refusing to let the ladies in her townhouse while it was raining. Frankel is still annoyed with Morgan's drunken behavior she later attempts to have a no-holds barred conversation with her Morgan is continued to be supported by Frankel when Frankel invites her to a business summit.

Morgan celebrates life being debt-free but inviting the ladies to Turks and Caicos. On the trip, Morgan defends herself against the other ladies' allegations of drinking too much and making advances at other peoples' boyfriends. Morgan tries to explains herself to Frankel but it leads to a fiery argument between them. In the morning, Morgan is reminded by Medley to stand up for herself. Later, Singer informs Morgan that the other ladies think she's an alcoholic, which bring Morgan to a boiling point and forces her to confront them.

Frankel is taken aback when she is reintroduced to the group at de Lessep's housewarming in the Hamptons. Frankel continues to renovate her new apartment and on a shopping trip for furniture she invites Radziwill and opens up about the struggles of parenting and having a social life. Frankel's apartment is finally complete and Radziwill comes to see it. Having hard time opening up to the other ladies, Frankel takes a trip to Miami to reconnect with her estranged father which leads to new revelations. Back in New York after meeting her father, Frankel seeks the support of her therapist to help her tap into her feelings so she can move forward with her relationships.

Singer continues to struggle will the separation from Mario, at her house Morgan and Medley affirm that she is better off. The ladies reach a consensus that Singer is a lot softer and less chaotic without Mario and appears better off. Singer reaches out to de Lesseps to discuss the past and apologize. Singer feels conflicted when Mario reveals to her that he wants to get back together and reunite their family. Singer's decisions are made easier when her daughter, Avery, arrives home from college and gives an adult perspective on the situation. Singer bonds with the unlikely Frankel over their failed marriages. Singer endeavors in to a new business of a sports bar, and finds herself flirting with her business partner Peter. With a decision of her future made, Singer hosts a "new beginnings" party.

De Lesseps heads to Miami to support her daughter Victoria as she featured in the art festival, Art Basel. De Lesseps invites all the ladies along to a photo shoot for her new clothing line but Taekman confronts Frankel on her timing issues which leaves Frankel in tears. De Lesseps continues with business by hosting a launch party for her clothing line, but Singer confronts Taekman on her treating of Frankel. Later at the party, Taekman is again at odds with Frankel. The newly single de Lesseps finds herself in an argument after a fun-filled night in Turks and Caicos when Thomson is outraged after finding a naked man in the room next to hers that Singer is responsible for.

Radziwill flirts with de Lesseps' younger chef Adam while at de Lesseps' house. The two meet away from de Lesseps' home for a date. Radziwill and her new relationship with Adam heats up as they host a dinner party for Taekman and Thomson. Radziwill's newfound friendship with Frankel reaches a new level after a sex dream. Radziwill invites Medley to London as she is going to pick up her late husband's ashes which turns out to be an emotional experience and the two bond over their woes of being widows.

Medley struggles balancing keeping the distance between her daughter and boyfriend. Medley also finds herself having to defend John after a cocktail party she hosts where he gets flirty with some of the other ladies. The struggle for Medley is made worse when Singer and de Lesseps call each other out on talking about John and Medley is left wondering who she should really be around and if the ladies should be invited to her birthday in the Berkshires. During the birthday dinner, Medley once again finds herself defending John over Taekmans's claims of inappropriate touching. In Turks and Caicos, Medley and Thomson find themselves in a confusing argument over etiquette. Medley is later conflicted after John reveals he wants to take the relationship to the next level.

== Episodes ==
The Real Housewives of New York City season 7 episodes
No. overall	No. in season	Title	Original release date	U.S. viewers (millions)
105	1	"The B Is Back"	April 7, 2015	1.57
The long-estranged Bethenny makes her return to the group as a changed woman in a time of personal chaos. Meanwhile, Ramona is still reeling from her divorce and confides in both Sonja and new housewife Dorinda to uneven results. Luann invites Carole, Heather, and Kristen to stay at her new Hamptons home.
106	2	"New House, Old Grudges"	April 14, 2015	1.52
In the Hamptons, Sonja and Dorinda finally meet each other while staying with Ramona. Luann hosts an informal housewarming party, where Carole takes an interest in her much-younger personal chef. Later, Bethenny's long-awaited arrival sparkes an immediate battle with Ramona.
107	3	"Battle of the Brunches"	April 21, 2015	1.45
Carole, Heather, Luann, and Kristen attempt to be diplomatic by attending both Bethenny and Ramona's separate brunches. Back in New York, Dorinda reconnects with her boyfriend John. And while Ramona and Luann are getting along now, it seems that Heather and Bethenny will not be fast friends.
108	4	"The Art of Being a Cougar"	April 28, 2015	1.30
Cougardom is in the air as Sonja and Luann bring young models as dates to Bethenny's birthday dinner, while Carole admits to secretly seeing Adam. Later, when Heather indicates that Kristen felt excluded, Carole and Dorinda witness a tense war-of-words between her and Bethenny.
109	5	"Mind Your Own Business"	May 5, 2015	1.31
With fair warning from the other women, Bethenny meets with Sonja to discuss her business aspiration. Kristen has a photo shoot for her thriving fashion blog. Later, Carole makes a confession to Luann, Sonja feels attacked from all sides, and Dorinda's boyfriend shows questionable behavior at her couples' cocktail party.
110	6	"Double Down on Delusion"	May 12, 2015	1.39
The women head to Atlantic City to celebrate Ramona's first birthday without Mario, but Sonja leaves Heather and Kristen fuming before they even get on the road. Later, the women are stunned at the unraveling of Sonja as the drinking and gambling go all night, and Bethenny tries unsuccessfully to get through to her.
111	7	"Family Matters"	May 19, 2015	1.09
At a boxing match, Luann makes a jab about Carole's young beau; Bethenny meets with her stepfather.
112	8	"The Cavi-Art of War"	May 26, 2015	1.30
Bethenny visits her therapist who urges her to tap into her feelings; Luann and Ramona face off.
113	9	"Birthday in the Berks"	June 2, 2015	1.18
The women head to the Berkshires in Massachusetts to celebrate Dorinda's 50th birthday.
114	10	"Pop of Crazy"	June 9, 2015	1.23
Bethenny and Heather get into a screaming match during Dorinda's birthday dinner.
115	11	"Fashionably Fired Up"	June 16, 2015	1.16
Bethenny invites the women to decorate cupcakes; Luann invites everyone to a photo shoot.
116	12	"Lord of the Manor"	June 23, 2015	1.41
The women leave snowy New York and head to the Turks and Caicos Islands.
117	13	"Sonja Island"	June 30, 2015	1.27
Ramona and Bethenny have a heart-to-heart; the women spend the day on a yacht.
118	14	"Conch Blocked"	July 7, 2015	1.36
The women go dancing at the Conch Bar; Sonja plans a day of fun at a beachfront hotel.
119	15	"Don't Be All, Like, Uncool"	July 14, 2015	1.51
Heather rebukes Luann and Ramona after waking up to find a naked man in the room attached to hers.
120	16	"Awfully Charitable"	July 21, 2015	1.24
At Kristen's charity event, Ramona is irked to see that Heather's jeans are displayed more prominently than her necklaces; Carole, Dorinda and Heather have an experience with a clairvoyant; Dr. Amador talks to Bethenny about her arrogant behavior.
121	17	"London Calling"	July 28, 2015	1.11
Carole and Dorinda arrive in London to retrieve Anthony's ashes and bond over the shared experience of losing their husbands; Sonja tries to teach the newly single Ramona about the dating world; everyone wears red to Bethenny's fiery party.
122	18	"Rumble on the Runway"	August 4, 2015	1.24
Ramona tells Dorinda she and Mario are really done. And behind the scenes at the Sonja Morgan New York fashion show, everything goes wrong for Sonja and unfortunately the chaos backstage spills out along the runway as Bethenny calls out Ramona who tries her best, but can't run away from the runway.
123	19	"New Beginnings, My Ass"	August 11, 2015	1.41
Carole shares with Bethenny that she's heard Luann has been talking behind her back. Ramona's New Beginnings party seems like old behavior all around when unresolved conflicts arise. Ramona does her best to maintain control of the party and the ladies help toast her into her new life.
124	20	"Reunion — Part 1"	August 18, 2015	1.31
The women provide conflicting accounts of how they reacted to the return of Bethenny; tensions resurface as the women remember their trip to Atlantic City, N.J.; from boyfriends to girl codes, LuAnn and Carole continue to bicker.
125	21	"Reunion — Part 2"	August 25, 2015	1.39
LuAnn and Carole continue to hash over their unresolved issues; Dorinda's unpredictable temper and her touchy-feely boyfriend become topics of discussion; then the women talk about men, dating and life as cougars.
126	22	"Reunion — Part 3"	August 27, 2015	0.84
Sonja goes on the defensive as everyone questions her business savvy; the women reminisce about their trip to the Turks and Caicos Islands, talking about naked men, skinny-dipping and lost opportunities.
127	23	"Secrets Revealed"	September 3, 2015	0.70
The hottest secrets from the season are revealed.
128	24	"100th Special: Watch What Happens Live Special"	September 17, 2015	N/A
Andy Cohen sits down with cast members past and present while revisiting the series' most unforgettable moments, from stormy confrontations to glamorous vacations.
