= The Real Housewives of New York City season 8 =

Season of television series

The Real Housewives of New York City
- Season 8
- Cover used by iTunes (Left to right) de Lesseps, Wainstein, Frankel, Radziwill, Singer, Medley, and Morgan
- Starring: Bethenny Frankel; Luann de Lesseps; Ramona Singer; Sonja Morgan; Carole Radziwill; Dorinda Medley; Jules Wainstein
- No. of episodes: 23

Release
- Original network: Bravo
- Original release: April 6 – September 14, 2016

Season chronology
- ← Previous; Season 7 Next → Season 9

The eighth season of The Real Housewives of New York City, an American reality television series, is broadcast on Bravo. It aired from April 6, 2016 until September 14, 2016, and is primarily filmed in New York City, New York. Its executive producers are Andrew Hoegl, Barrie Bernstein, Lisa Shannon, Pam Healy and Andy Cohen.

The Real Housewives of New York City focuses on the lives of Bethenny Frankel, Luann de Lesseps, Ramona Singer, Sonja Morgan, Carole Radziwill, Dorinda Medley and Jules Wainstein. It consisted of 23 episodes.

This season marked the only appearance of Jules Wainstein.

== Production and crew ==
The Real Housewives of New York City season seven was a ratings success for the network, averaging 2.4 total million viewers which was an eight percent increase among total viewers. It was reported that the series had been renewed in November, 2015 along with the beginning of production. The series was subsequently renewed with the cast, trailer and premiere date being announced in March, 2016.

The season premiere "Start Spreading the News" was aired on April 6, 2016, while the twentieth "Say It Ain't So" served as the season finale, and was aired on August 24, 2016. It was followed by a three-part reunion that aired on August 31, September 7 and September 14, 2016, which marked the conclusion of the season. Andrew Hoegl, Barrie Bernstein, Lisa Shannon, Pam Healy and Andy Cohen are recognized as the series' executive producers; it is produced by Ricochet and is distributed by Shed Media.

== Cast and synopsis ==
=== Cast ===
Six of the eight wives featured on season seven returned for the eighth. In September 2015, Heather Thomson announced she would be walking away from the series after three seasons to focus on her business and family saying, "I have to focus on the things that are really, really important in my life and that's my family and my business. While I'm filming the show, I also am running a multi-million dollar business, and it takes away a lot of my time from the company." Thomson went on to praise the franchise and celebrated her time on the show. Although Thomson departed the series as a full-time cast member, she guest appeared on season eight.

Also departing the series is Kristen Taekman who announced in October 2015, that she too would be walking away from the series. Taekman, a full-time cast member for two seasons, left for similar reasons to Thomson, to focus on her family and business saying, "At this time in my life, I have decided to concentrate on my family and my new business ventures Pop Of Color nail polish and Last Night's Look, my fashion blog." She also praised the franchise and relished in her time on the show.

With the departure of the two wives, it saw the introduction of a new one, Jules Wainstein. Wainstein is a Hong-Kong born stay-at-home mom of two to Jagger, 5, and Rio, 2. Jules is a socialite in New York City. Inspired by her father's career as a fashion entrepreneur, she studied at the Fashion Institute of Technology in New York City. Jules has worked in fashion boutiques as a buyer and later used her skills to be an even-planner for Women's International Zionist Organization. Jules spends her days raising her kids with her husband Michael while they split their time between three homes, in Manhattan, Water Mill and in Barry Island, and continues to attend social events and charity galas. Wainstein is the only married housewife featured on season eight. Wainstein is described by friend, and former cast member of The Real Housewives of New York City, Cindy Barshop as a real housewife saying, "when she has a party, it's to the top. And she does a performance, and that's naturally what she does."

=== Synopsis ===
The season begins with Bethenny Frankel enjoying her home as she juggles her business, dating and her ongoing divorce. Carole Radziwill and her boyfriend Adam continue to pursue their relationship, and Ramona Singer navigates her single life while exploring the dating scene in New York City. Sonja Morgan begins to feel the empty-nest syndrome after her daughter goes off to boarding school, so she invites Luann de Lesseps to come stay for a while. Dorinda Medley enjoys her relationship with her boyfriend John but isn't enjoying having to constantly defend him and their relationship. Medley invites Frankel and her friend, and new wife, Jules Wainstein for lunch but the lunch turns from sweet to sour.

Frankel plans a chic tail-gate birthday party at her Hamptons home. After being insulted by John at Medley's bra party. John attends the party with the intent to apologize, but it turns into another confrontation. Seeing Medley upset being torn between friends and her boyfriend, Frankel extends him an olive branch. Frankel attempts to organize a trip to Mexico but after a sudden health issue it's changed to Miami instead. Frankel is distraught after a visit with her doctor when she finds out the severity of health and the measures to take.

Singer enjoys her newly revamped and Mario-free apartment that now offers more light that the curtains are gone. Singer hosts a birthday lunch but is offended when de Lesseps makes a regifting faux pas.

De Lesseps introduces her new boyfriend Tom, who Medley set her up with, to Wainstein and her husband during a couple dinner with Medley and John. A couple of ladies realize Singer has a past with de Lessep's new boyfriend. During a trip in The Berkshires at Medley's home, Frankel and de Lesseps get into a heated argument, with a lot of name-calling. Singer then accuses de Lesseps of breaking the girl code. De Lesseps reveals to all the ladies that she has found love with Tom, but more of Tom's history surfaces. During a confrontation between de Lesseps and Singer on Singer's history with Tom, Morgan reveals she has been having relations with Tom for the last decade. Despite everyone's opinions, de Lesseps reveals she is engaged to Tom and the ladies are left feeling conflicted bout the last-minute engagement party in Palm Beach during the Miami trip. During the trip Frankel meets a friend and reveals she has information that could jeopardize de Lesseps' relationship. Later in Miami, Singer's issues with the engagement surface while Morgan's realizes her feelings regarding Tom and his engagement to de Lesseps. Frankel meets up with the ladies as she determines the level of severity of her information. In the effort to determine whether to tell de Lesseps of her information, she shares it with Radziwill and Singer, who then shares it with Morgan. Frankel and Morgan continue to discuss it later that night and do some research which includes Frankel calling Tom. Frankel realizes she has no other choice but to tell de Lesseps that Tom has cheated. After hearing the news of Tom cheating and seeing the photos, de Lesseps is devastated and calls Tom to make sense of situation. Returning to New York, de Lesseps stay in a hotel to gather her thoughts. She later reveals at Frankel's Mexican themed party that she has forgiven Tom.

Morgan and Singer have a rift in their friendship and Singer reveals she has been avoiding Morgan due to her excessive partying. Singer continues to raise concerns about Morgan's party ways when she argues with de Lesseps that she will be a bad influence when living with Morgan. Frankel confronts de Lesseps on the same topic after she hears that de Lesseps is living with and “mentoring” Morgan. Morgan reveals he next business endeavor which immediately raises concerns. Morgan meets Frankel at her office and is taken aback when Frankel reacts to her new business, calling it a copycat business. After being pressure by Singer and de Lesseps, Morgan tries to apologize to Frankel but gets the cold shoulder. After the bump with her TipsyGirl business, Morgan decides to change her partying ways which leads to Morgan and Singer getting their friendship back on track.

Radziwill opens up to Frankel on her ongoing drama with de Lesseps in regards to her boyfriend Adam. During the trip to the Berkshires, Singer encourages de Lesseps to apologize to Radziwill for calling her a pedophile, though Radziwill questions if it's sincere. Her relationship with Adam evolves when they foster a kitten and work on a vegan cookbook together.

Medley hosts a Lingerie night and finds herself defending John after Frankel claims Medley is "over-selling" John to everyone. Singer gets involved and reveals some shocking information about John. Medley finds herself now in a confrontation with Singer and brings up her recent failed marriage. Later at the party, John turns up uninvited and Medley asks him to leave. Medley continues to argue with Singer, over her views on her relationship with John, during a psychic reading hosted by Radziwill. Later, after Singer bonds with an ex of de Lesseps at Medley's event, Medley and Singer end up arguing on the sidewalk.

Wainstein hosts a lunch at her home that's currently being renovated. Frankel arrives and gives unsolicited opinion on the home leaving Wainstein unimpressed. Frankel and Wainstein meet to air their differences and Frankel has a new respect for Wainstein after she reveal her history of having an eating disorder. Her trip to the Berkshires with the other ladies takes a turn for the worse when she receives a phone call about a family emergency. Back in New York, Wainstein adjusts to her life without a nanny. She suffers an injury to her vagina and meets with her plastic surgeon about the possible damages. Despite their bonding, a tension build up between Frankel and Wainstein resulting in Wainstein giving Frankel her frank opinion after listening to Frankel and the wives talk badly about de Lesseps.

== Episodes ==
The Real Housewives of New York City season 8 episodes
No. overall	No. in season	Title	Original release date	U.S. viewers (millions)
129	1	"Start Spreading the News"	April 6, 2016	1.25
Bethenny and Dorinda welcome new housewife Jules into the group at a testy brunch. A lonely Sonja invites Luann to come stay with her, while Ramona tries to enjoy her new single lifestyle and Carole is still going strong with boyfriend Adam.
130	2	"An Intimates Affair"	April 13, 2016	1.24
While Luann and Sonja bond over sparkling wine on the Upper East Side, Carole meets with Bethenny to discuss how to handle her issues with Luann at an upcoming event. Dorinda hosts a lingerie party where Bethenny and Ramona have harsh words for John.
131	3	"The Biggest Boob"	April 20, 2016	1.43
The chaos continues at the lingerie party as John shows up for a showdown with Bethenny. Later, as Sonja tags along for apartment-hunting with homeless Luann, the rest of the women head to the Hamptons and Dorinda isn't ready to make nice with Ramona.
132	4	"BBQ, Brunch, or Bust"	April 27, 2016	1.32
Bethenny hosts a dreadful birthday party in the Hamptons, where Carole pointedly rejects Luann's attempt at apologies and the hostess herself avoids John as much as possible. Jules is later insulted at Bethenny's criticisms of her home at an awkward Sunday brunch.
133	5	"Birthday Bashing"	May 4, 2016	1.32
Jules airs her frustrations to Carole and Dorinda, but later takes a different approach with getting to know Bethenny. Ramona apprehensively invites the prodigal Sonja to her birthday lunch, where Luann finds herself the disfavored talk of the room.
134	6	"Tipsying Point"	May 11, 2016	1.31
Carole hosts a psychic session that turns ugly between Dorinda and Ramona. Later, some of the women attend Sonja's birthday party, where she unveils her latest business venture and Luann is reprimanded by Ramona for her supposed mentoring of Sonja.
135	7	"Airing Your Dirty Laundry"	May 18, 2016	1.30
Sonja is caught off-guard by Bethenny's abrasive response to the Tipsy Girl idea. Meanwhile, Jules is on the hunt for a new nanny and Carole begins a new writing project. At John's party, a man from Luann's past is the catalyst for an explosive fight between Ramona and Dorinda.
136	8	"All the Countess's Men"	May 25, 2016	1.56
Luann introduces her new boyfriend to a few of the ladies, while Bethenny hosts a holiday party where some women are more willing to make up than others. Dorinda disinvites Sonja from the Berkshires where several storms are brewing between Luann, Ramona, and Bethenny.
137	9	"December: Berkshires County"	June 1, 2016	1.61
In the Berkshires, Luann is on defense from every end as Bethenny, Ramona, and Carole all take varying degrees of issue with her, upsetting Dorinda into an epic meltdown of her own. Meanwhile, Jules receives worrying news from New York.
138	10	"Unhappy Holidays"	June 8, 2016	1.52
The Berkshires trip comes to a close as the ladies head back to New York with all-around bruised feelings. Later, at Ramona's holiday party, Luann makes a heartfelt apology to Carole and Sonja explodes under the women's continued scrutiny, taking specific aim at Dorinda.
139	11	"Invitation Interrupted"	June 15, 2016	1.60
Carole and Jules each gain newfound perspectives on the men in their lives, while Luann shares some shocking news that may concern both Ramona and Sonja, who announces that she has quit drinking. Bethenny proposes a trip to Mexico and reveals not all of the ladies are invited.
140	12	"Always the Bitch, Never the Bride"	June 22, 2016	1.38
Ramona reunites with Sonja to help her get back in Bethenny's good graces. Jules shares a new business idea with Michael, and Bethenny has a health scare on a shopping trip. Later, Carole's dog participates in a high-society wedding and Dorinda brings bad news for the women.
141	13	"Steel Calzones"	June 29, 2016	1.57
As Bethenny receives distressing news about her health, Sonja confronts painful memories while cleaning out her basement with Dorinda. Jules' erratic behavior concerns Carole, who visits with an old friend across town. Later, Ramona pressures Luann to try again at making amends with the women, but she doesn't want to hear it.
142	14	"The Benefits of Friendship"	July 6, 2016	1.62
While Sonja and Ramona enjoy their rekindled friendship, Dorinda clues Luann into the rumors being spread about her. Bethenny hosts a launch party for a new Skinnygirl product. Meanwhile, Jules gets an update on her injury, and during a girls' night out, Sonja divulges shocking details about her relationship with Tom.
143	15	"All Bets Are Off"	July 13, 2016	1.53
Sonja is set up on a blind date at a dinner party with Dorinda and Jules, who later gives Bethenny a piece of her mind over her mean-girl behavior. A deeply hurt Luann rebukes Ramona's attempts at apology. Later, the ladies leave New York behind as they hit the road for a weekend away in Connecticut.
144	16	"The Countess Bride"	July 20, 2016	1.32
At the Mohegan Sun casino, Sonja gets a chance to talk to Bethenny and the women finally find themselves enjoying one another's company. Back in New York, Luann begins planning her engagement dinner, but everyone has conflicting ideas. Carole and Adam discuss their future together.
145	17	"And Away We Finally Go"	July 27, 2016	1.43
After the ladies head to Miami for a vacation, they're left feeling conflicted about Luann's last-minute engagement party. As tension brews, unresolved issues arise. Later, Bethenny visits a friend while in Miami and Jules visits her family.
146	18	"Body of Evidence"	August 3, 2016	1.79
Drinks and emotions are stirred at an engagement party for Luann, leaving tension between the bride-to-be, Luann, and Ramona. Jules struggles with parenting away from home as she takes a cruise on a yacht. Also in Miami, the women meet up with Bethenny.
147	19	"Tomfoolery"	August 17, 2016	1.78
In Miami, the women find themselves dividing into factions. Dorinda voices her frustration with Ramona, and a few others, for continually disregarding her plans for the group. Meanwhile, Bethenny shares a nasty secret about Tom with some of the women, eventually being forced to tell Luann herself on the final morning of the trip.
148	20	"Say It Ain't So"	August 24, 2016	1.96
The fallout from Tom's infidelity divides the women as they absorb the content, and delivery, of the news. Back in New York, Luann checks into a hotel to gather her thoughts, while Dorinda receives a threatening phone call about a possible cover-up. And at Bethenny's Mexican-themed party, it becomes clear that there are deep-seated issues amongst the group that will be left unresolved for the foreseeable future.
149	21	"Reunion Part 1"	August 31, 2016	1.82
In part one, Dorinda continues to defend her relationship with John, Sonja makes an explosive drug-use accusation against Dorinda, Ramona expresses her enjoyment of the single life, and Luann calls Bethenny a hypocrite and starts a firestorm of alleged lies and truths.
150	22	"Reunion Part 2"	September 7, 2016	1.81
In part two, Bethenny discusses the frayed relationships in her life, Jules defends herself against harsh criticisms regarding her faith and marriage, Ramona and Sonja continue their fight for Luann's trust, and Dorinda takes issue with Carole's penchant for her "mean girl" commentary.
151	23	"Reunion Part 3"	September 14, 2016	1.76
As the reunion concludes, Sonja lashes out at the other women, namely Dorinda and Ramona, for ostracizing her throughout the season, Carole is accused of being Bethenny's puppet, and Luann and Dorinda take on Bethenny and the way she handled things in Miami.
