= The Real Housewives of New York City season 6 =

Season of television series

The Real Housewives of New York City
- Season 6
- Cover used by iTunes (Left to right) Taekman, Radziwill, Thomson, Drescher, Singer, and Morgan
- Starring: Ramona Singer; Sonja Morgan; Aviva Drescher; Carole Radziwill; Heather Thomson; Kristen Taekman
- No. of episodes: 23

Release
- Original network: Bravo
- Original release: March 11 – August 12, 2014

Season chronology
- ← Previous; Season 5 Next → Season 7

The sixth season of The Real Housewives of New York City, an American reality television series, is broadcast on Bravo. It aired March 11, 2014 until August 12, 2014, and is primarily filmed in New York City, New York. Its executive producers are Andrew Hoegl, Barrie Bernstein, Lisa Shannon, Pam Healy and Andy Cohen.

The Real Housewives of New York City focuses on the lives of Ramona Singer, Sonja Morgan, Aviva Drescher, Carole Radziwill, Heather Thomson and Kristen Taekman; This season marked the first departure of original housewife Luann de Lesseps. Luann was absent for 4 of the season's 23 episodes and was referred to instead as a "friend" of the housewives. She eventually returned for the show's 7th season.

This season marked the final appearance of Aviva Drescher.

== Production and crew ==
The Real Housewives of New York City was renewed for a sixth season in February 2013. The full cast, trailer and premiere date were released in January 2014 with a 30-minute special preview that aired on February 12, 2014.

The season premiere "If You Can Make It Here" was aired on March 11, 2014, while the twentieth episode "The Last Leg" served as the season finale, and was aired on July 22, 2014. It was followed by a three-part reunion that aired on July 29, August 5 and August 12, 2014, which marked the conclusion of the season. Andrew Hoegl, Barrie Bernstein, Lisa Shannon, Pam Healy and Andy Cohen are recognized as the series' executive producers; it is produced by Ricochet and is distributed by Shed Media.

It was reported the year gap between season five of The Real Housewives of New York and season six was attributed to a cast stand-off for a pay increase with Carole Radziwill posting on Twitter "Payscale is ridix + it irks me to be given ultimatums," as well as a ratings drop in season five. Season five debuted with a 1.66 total million viewers and dropped to less than a million during its season finale and season five being the second-lowest-rated season of the series, dropping 26 percent in the 18-49 demo from season four of The Real Housewives of New York.

== Cast and synopsis ==
=== Cast ===
All six wives featured on the fifth season returned for the sixth installment however, Luann de Lesseps returned in a recurring capacity which made Ramona Singer the last remaining original cast member during season six. De Lesseps stated stepping back in season six was her choice and that she is glad to be recurring during the season saying "It's a win-win for me, I'm still on the show. I'm still very much a part of the show, but it's not a fulltime thing. It's very engulfing when you're on it. It takes up all of your mental and physical energy." De Lesseps remained a part of the drama through the series and season six continued to document de Lesseps' relationship with Jacques that later ended. Although Aviva Drescher returned for the sixth season as a full-time cast member, in multiple episodes she was removed from the intro at the beginning of the episodes due to not attending the cast trips.

Season six introduced Kristen Taekman as a full-time cast member. Taekman is an Elvis Presley obsessed entrepreneur, who launched a line of high-end greeting card boxes called "2nd Street Press" in 2009. Taekman is also a successful model and has been modelling since the age of sixteen, appearing in Vogue Australia, Harper’s Bazaar, and Glamour. She has been married to Josh Taekman for ten years and the couple have two children together; Cash, 5, and Kingsley, 2. Taekman revealed that her friend, and cast member of The Real Housewives of Beverly Hills, Brandi Glanville helped her get the role on The Real Housewives of New York City.

=== Synopsis ===
Heather Thomson kicks off the season by hosting a party. Everyone is introduced to the new wife, Taekman, but they're not excited about seeing Aviva Drescher after her past behavior. Despite Taekman and Thomson being friends prior to Taekman joining the series, the two find themselves at odds in Montana and the other ladies take sides.

Drescher's memoir gets her a book deal and she seeks Carole Radziwill for help due to her being an author. The meeting soon turns sour when the mention of a ghostwriter surfaces. Drescher hosts a housewarming for her home, but her and Radziwill get into an explosive argument, due to Radziwill hearing from Singer that Drescher had been gossiping about her. The argument between Drescher and Radziwill continues in the Hamptons at de Lesseps' house and this time Thomson steps in to defend Radziwill. Away from the drama with the ladies, Drescher confronts her fears when she returns to the scene that took her leg when she was younger. Drescher finds herself in a fight with de Lesseps after sending around a text that offended the Countess.

Taekman bonds with Thomson by taking part in a mud run, with their husbands involved. However, when her husband leaves her behind, Taekman is left feeling disappointed. Later, tension between the couple arises and deeper issues come out after he arrives late for dinner. The two seek professional help to get their marriage back on track. Taekman and Radziwill catch up with their friends, and cast mates from The Real Housewives of Beverly Hills, Brandi Glanville and Yolanda Foster. Taekman is shocked to find out that her days of modeling may be over after meeting with an agent. She later pulls some matrimonial string and lands herself a modeling job.

Singer returns to the series after returning from a family trip to Africa. After avoiding Thomson's anniversary party, her and Taekman butt heads in the Hamptons for the Fourth of July weekend. The following day Singer stands up to Morgan and ends up spilling details of Morgan's debt all over the Hamptons. The feud between Singer and Taekman worsens on a trip to Thomson's holiday home in the Berkshires after Singer throws a wine glass into Taekman's face. Singer's trip in the Berkshires doesn't last long after stumbling upon something that brings up the horrors of her childhood. The ladies question the real reason she left and plan to give her her just deserts once they return to New York. Singer and her husband plan for an empty nest as their daughter Avery heads off to college. During the reunion, host Andy Cohen asks Singer about the status of her marriage after reports of her and her husband getting a divorce after his being caught cheating. De Lesseps calls Singer out on her hypocrisy due to her previous comments in regards to de Lesseps' divorce.

Sonja Morgan performs a burlesque number in the Hamptons for a charity event and invites the other ladies along to watch. Sonja hosts a memorial for her recently deceased dog where the ladies attend to say their goodbye and support Morgan. During a trip in Saratoga, hosted by de Lesseps, Morgan drinks a little too much and things get out of hand. Morgan finds herself arguing with de Lesseps in Montana after her facialist has been talking about de Lesseps.

Radziwill is honored at the Coney Island Mermaid Parade, and she invites Taekman, Morgan, de Lesseps and Thomson to join her on the float.

== Episodes ==
The Real Housewives of New York City season 6 episodes
No. overall	No. in season	Title	Original release date	U.S. viewers (millions)
82	1	"If You Can Make It Here"	March 11, 2014	1.33
Aviva works to mend her friendship with Ramona. Heather invites all the ladies to her birthday party; where the newest housewife, Kristen, is introduced.
83	2	"Give Up the Ghostwriter"	March 18, 2014	1.31
Ramona starts telling everyone the latest gossip surrounding Carole. Sonja goes to dinner with Aviva's ex-husband. Aviva hosts a housewarming party at her Townhouse and reveals that she has a book deal for her memoir.
84	3	"Model Behavior"	March 25, 2014	1.44
Carole and Aviva's altercation surprises everyone. Kristen is forced to partake in a mud run. Ramona assists Avery in picking out a prom dress.
85	4	"Holla in the Hamptons"	April 1, 2014	1.29
The ladies take their annual trip to The Hamptons where Sonja will be performing at a charity event. All of the women later visit LuAnn's house for a barbecue. Heather ends up taking Carole's side in an argument.
86	5	"Everybody Thinks We're Drag Queens"	April 8, 2014	1.20
The ending of the barbecue opens the episode. Afterwards, Carole receives honor at the Coney Island Mermaid Parade. A few of the women dress up as drag queens.
87	6	"Unhappy Anniversary"	April 15, 2014	1.26
As all of the women return to New York, Ramona wants to fix Aviva and Heather's friendship. Carole and Kristen have lunch with Yolanda and Brandi from The Real Housewives of Beverly Hills. Heather and her husband, Jonathan, invite everyone to their anniversary party.
88	7	"Fireworks"	April 22, 2014	1.38
Ramona and Mario compete against Kristen and Josh in a tennis match. Kristen and Ramona get into a verbal altercation. Sonja and Ramona's sister-like bond begins to crumble. Aviva tries to mend things with Carole.
89	8	"Unforgivable Debt"	April 29, 2014	1.46
Due to their recent falling out, Ramona begins to reveal Sonja's financial difficulties. Kristen attends a meeting with a new modeling agency and gets word about an offer. Sonja's date never shows up and she suspects that Ramona is behind it.
90	9	"The Last Splash"	May 6, 2014	1.48
Heather includes the ladies, excluding Aviva, on her trip up to The Berkshires. Ramona and Kristen get into an altercation while in the lake. Later, Carole goes to a matchmaker and Kristen asks her husband to review Sonja's business plan.
91	10	"Bon Voyage Ramona"	May 13, 2014	1.43
Heather, in an attempt to bring the women together, sets up a dinner with an Elvis Presley impersonator. Later, the ladies go hiking and Ramona begins to have a panic attack as the woods bring back memories of her childhood. Ramona calls a friend to fly her back to New York City. The remaining women tan, swim, and enjoy a day at the lake.
92	11	"The Ramona Trap"	May 20, 2014	1.20
After returning to the city, the wives confront Ramona as to why she departed early but attended a party in the Hamptons. LuAnn has Carole come over for a double date. Kristen receives an apology from Ramona.
93	12	"Requiem for a Poodle"	May 27, 2014	1.17
Aviva's father, George, returns, with a surprise. Sonja bids farewell to her dog in a memorial.
94	13	"Win, Place or Sonja"	June 3, 2014	1.13
Aviva hosts an engagement party for her father George. Carole, Heather, Luann, Sonja and Kristen head to Saratoga for horse racing.
95	14	"Sex, Lies and Facials"	June 10, 2014	1.13
Sonja begins to gossip about the other women to Kristen, who shares what she heard to Carole and Luann, who deny the stories. Luann hosts a luncheon where Aviva annoys the countess. Former housewife Kelly Killoren Bensimon makes a guest appearance at the luncheon, shocking Ramona.
96	15	"Ten Gallon Spats"	June 17, 2014	1.01
The ladies prepare for their trip to Montana. Aviva produces a doctors note for asthma, which prevents her from going on the trip. After arriving in Montana, the ladies head out on a real-life cattle drive.
97	16	"Go Yell It on the Mountain"	June 24, 2014	1.27
Still in Montana, the women try fly fishing, skeet-shooting and repelling. The hostility between Sonja and LuAnn continues.
98	17	"Bury the Hatchet"	July 1, 2014	1.15
As Kristen and Heather continue to feud, the other ladies are all forced to take a stance.
99	18	"Something to Sing About"	July 8, 2014	1.29
LuAnn and Heather are chosen to perform at a jazz club. Meanwhile, Aviva makes the decision that she needs to take a break from the women.
100	19	"There's Something About Harry"	July 15, 2014	1.13
Ramona attempts to deal with Avery going off to college, while Carole hosts a lavish party to celebrate her 50th birthday. Sonja is gifted a present from Aviva's ex-husband Harry and soon after, Harry is nowhere to be found.
101	20	"The Last Leg"	July 22, 2014	1.50
After being ditched at Carole's birthday party, Sonja confronts both Harry and LuAnn about their alleged night together. Kristen gets a modeling gig for her husband's eBoost company and when Aviva returns to the group for the first time in weeks, insults, accusations and body parts fly in an explosive season ending confrontation.
102	21	"Reunion — Part 1"	July 29, 2014	1.31
Ramona is in the hot seat for her behavior towards Kristen in the Berkshires, and Carole confronts Sonja about spreading rumors about her ex. Plus, LuAnn minces no words telling Sonja exactly what she thinks of her and her sometimes questionable headspace.
103	22	"Reunion — Part 2"	August 5, 2014	1.51
In Part 2 of the reunion, tension between Aviva and Carole comes to a head as they unravel the details of the infamous "Bookgate" feud. Things take an unexpected turn when Andy asks Ramona for answers about the status of her marriage.
104	23	"Reunion — Part 3"	August 12, 2014	1.31
In Part 3 of the reunion, Heather and Aviva butt heads when Aviva decides to "out" Heather. Ramona tries to dismiss Kristen and her opinions, but the new girl won't be so easily shut down. Ramona and Sonja must defend their relationship. Aviva discusses what led her to throw her leg at Le Cirque.
