= Bethenny Ever After =

Television series

- Also known as: Bethenny Getting Married?
- Genre: Reality
- Starring: Bethenny Frankel; Jason Hoppy; Julie Plake; Jackie Lagratta
- Country of origin: United States
- Original language: English
- No. of seasons: 3
- No. of episodes: 36 (list of episodes)

Production
- Executive producers: Jennifer O'Connell; Matt Anderson; Nick Emmerson
- Running time: 40–43 minutes
- Production company: Shed Media

Original release
- Network: Bravo
- Release: June 10, 2010 – May 28, 2012

Related
- The Real Housewives of New York City

Bethenny Ever After is an American reality television series that premiered on Bravo on June 10, 2010. Developed as the second spin-off in The Real Housewives franchise, it focuses on Bethenny Frankel from The Real Housewives of New York City.

The series premiered on June 10, 2010, as Bethenny Getting Married and became Bravo's highest rated series premiere in the network's history but was later surpassed by Married to Medicine in March 2013.

It was reported in January 2012, that Frankel made the decision that the third and final season of the series would be her last in order for her to concentrate on her business ventures. Frankel confirmed the reports by announcing on her talk show, Bethenny, that she is done with reality television.

In October 2014, it was announced that Frankel would return to The Real Housewives of New York City after a three-season hiatus.

== Premise ==
In the first season, Bethenny Frankel prepares her life for two of life's biggest milestones: a wedding and a baby, simultaneously. Frankel prepares for motherhood and weds Jason Hoppy, while maintaining her career as an author and natural foods chef with the help of her assistant, Julie Plake.

The second season follows more of Frankel as she focuses on motherhood, marriage, SkinnyGirl and skating. She also continues to grow her business and venture into new areas, with her new SkinnyGirl team member, Jackie Lagratta. Frankel deals with the tensions of visiting family members from out of town. During this season, Frankel turns 40 and celebrates Bryn turning one. She also looks at her future as an older parent and adult.

The third and final season of Bethenny Ever After chronicles the sales of SkinnyGirl cocktails introducing some added luxuries into Frankel's life: a large new apartment, remote vacations, and a larger staff are all part of the perks. As things change, Frankel adjusts to her marriage, lawsuits, and life in the public eye.

== Episodes ==
Bethenny Ever After episodes
Season	Episodes	Originally released	
Season	Episodes	First released	Last released
1	10	June 10, 2010	August 12, 2010
2	11	February 28, 2011	May 9, 2011
3	15	February 20, 2012	May 28, 2012
