= List of Bethenny Ever After episodes =

Bethenny Ever After is an American reality television series on Bravo that debuted on June 10, 2010, as Bethenny Getting Married. It is a spin-off of The Real Housewives of New York City. The series features Bethenny Frankel, a former castmate of The Real Housewives of New York; Jason Hoppy, Frankel's partner; Julie Plake, Frankel's assistant; and in the second season Jackie Lagratta is introduced as Frankel's co-worker. The first season documented Frankel and Hoppy as they prepared for their wedding and as well as the wedding day itself. In 2011, the series had been renamed to its current title upon renewal. Later seasons follow Frankel dealing with motherhood, the trials and tribulations of marriage and managing her businesses.

During the course of the series, 36 original episodes of Bethenny Ever After aired over three seasons.

== Series overview ==
Bethenny Ever After episodes
Season	Episodes	Originally released	
Season	Episodes	First released	Last released
1	10	June 10, 2010	August 12, 2010
2	11	February 28, 2011	May 9, 2011
3	15	February 20, 2012	May 28, 2012

== Episodes ==
=== Season 1 (2010) ===
Bethenny Ever After season 1 episodes
No. overall	No. in season	Title	Original release date	US viewers (millions)
1	1	"Mi Casa, Su Casa"	June 10, 2010	2.09
Bethenny launches the next chapter of her life: marriage and a baby.
2	2	"In-laws We Trust"	June 17, 2010	1.89
Bethenny races to find the perfect dress, locale, and planner for her upcoming nuptials.
3	3	"88% to a Million"	June 24, 2010	1.66
Bethenny, Jason and their friends head to Atlantic City to celebrate their engagement over a weekend but the pressure of planning a wedding and raging pregnancy hormones start to get the best of Bethenny.
4	4	"Let Me Eat Cake!"	July 1, 2010	1.72
Bethenny scrambles to plan her wedding and becomes frustrated with her unhelpful fiance. Real Housewives of New York City castmate Alex McCord hosts a bridal shower for Bethenny.
5	5	"So Hoppy Together"	July 8, 2010	2.25
The wedding arrives just as Bethenny finishes her book.
6	6	"The Honeymoon Is Over"	July 15, 2010	1.64
With their wedding behind them, Bethenny and Jason head to St. Bart's to relax and enjoy their honeymoon. But anxiety kicks in when the discussion leans towards the pending arrival of the baby.
7	7	"Baby Won't Wait"	July 22, 2010	1.90
Bethenny's baby Bryn arrives 5 weeks early. Her assistants scramble to ready the apartment while Bethenny endures 5 days in labor.
8	8	"Bryn Here, Done That"	July 29, 2010	1.53
Bethenny and Jason bring home Baby Bryn. Later, Bethenny and Jason tackle parenting.
9	9	"Getting More Than Married"	August 5, 2010	1.86
The finale wraps up the season with a vacation in Montauk for Bethenny, Jason, Bryn, Bethenny's assistants, and Gina.
10	10	"Lost Footage"	August 12, 2010	1.37

=== Season 2 (2011) ===
Bethenny Ever After season 2 episodes
No. overall	No. in season	Title	Original release date	US viewers (millions)
11	1	"Hoppy Trails to You"	February 28, 2011	1.50
Bethenny and Jason visit Jason's hometown in Hazleton, Pennsylvania, with baby Bryn and Bethenny's dog, Cookie.
12	2	"There Is No Normal"	March 7, 2011	1.66
A magazine hosts a gala honoring Bethenny for her style, and tension develops when Jason suggests visiting his parents again.
13	3	"Business as Usual"	March 14, 2011	1.23
Bethenny discovers there are problems with the distribution and manufacture of Skinnygirl Margarita, and that stores cannot keep up with demand.
14	4	"It's My Baptism and I'll Cry If I Want To"	March 21, 2011	1.34
Gina brings Bethenny, Jason and baby Bryn to her Trinidadian Baptist church to provide a blessing to Bryn, but it feels more like a baptism to Bethenny and Jason, which they wanted to have performed in a Catholic church.
15	5	"Ice Castles and Hassles"	March 28, 2011	1.28
While Bethenny wrestles with her upcoming 40th birthday, she receives an invitation to appear on Skating with the Stars.
16	6	"Fleeing From 40"	April 4, 2011	1.35
Bethenny's birthday bash doesn't exactly go as planned.
17	7	"The Mile High Club"	April 11, 2011	1.56
In their first trip away from baby Bryn, Bethenny and Jason fly to Montreal to pay a visit to the Skinnygirl bottling plant.
18	8	"I Need Some Lovin' From My Oven"	April 18, 2011	1.35
Bethenny deals with her baby nurse's leaving, Skating with the Stars, and a dramatic Thanksgiving dinner disaster.
19	9	"Don't Get Fat and Bloated"	April 25, 2011	1.62
Bethenny finds a new, multi-talented baby nanny, and jets to Malibu for relaxation and Skating With the Stars.
20	10	"Thin Ice, Ugly Sweaters"	May 2, 2011	1.34
Bethenny wraps up Skating with the Stars and celebrates Christmas in Malibu with Jason, Bryn, Dawa and Julie before the bus tour begins.
21	11	"Skinny on the Skinny"	May 9, 2011	1.72
In the Season 2 finale, the speaking bus tour rolls on, and Bethenny ponders a life-changing proposition.

=== Season 3 (2012) ===
Bethenny Ever After season 3 episodes
No. overall	No. in season	Title	Original release date	US viewers (millions)
22	1	"Mo' Money, Mo' Problems"	February 20, 2012	0.97
It's been a crazy year for Bethenny, but life shows no sign of slowing down. Season 3 kicks off with a party for the first new cocktail since the sale of Skinnygirl. Friends old and new are in attendance, even Today show host Hoda Kotb, along with her boyfriend Jay. Bethenny takes life in the public eye in stride but Jason struggles with the constant attention. Parties and press interviews are only a fraction of the new parents' hectic schedule, managing their second year of marriage, caring for their daughter Bryn, and purchasing a new apartment are just some of the challenges ahead.
23	2	"Alias Benjamin Frankelin"	February 27, 2012	1.03
Bethenny decides to have a good old fashioned girls' weekend in her favorite stomping ground – Montauk. With Bryn, Dawa and Cookie by her side, Bethenny turns off the world and takes a drive out to the beach. She lavishes her closest girlfriends with a summer weekend getaway and in turn they put pressure on her to have a second baby. The weekend is full of fun, sun, clambakes and a revelation that Bethenny after the success, she has trouble trusting anyone other than her oldest and closest friends.
24	3	"The Damaged One"	March 5, 2012	0.98
It's back to the beach, this time for another soiree to celebrate Skinnygirl cocktails. Bethenny decides to work on her matchmaking skills, her targets — Julie's sister Jonie and her partner in Skinnygirl Daily Nutrition, Matt. The two hit it off, but the next day, Bethenny and Jason end up fighting about Bethenny's "inappropriate" line of questioning. Back in the city, it's time to get the apartment renovation underway and Jason reminds their stellar design team that he would like to be considered as they put the pieces together. In Bethenny’s weekly session with therapist, Dr. Amador proposes a couple's workshop on his boat for Bethenny and Jason to work on their issues.
25	4	"Shrink Resistant"	March 12, 2012	1.02
The second year of marriage is proving to be more difficult than the first for Bethenny and Jason. Bethenny confides to her hairstylist that she and Jason are in a fight and she has been feeling distant from Jason. On top of that, the new apartment's design team is not getting along. Bethenny calls a meeting to get everyone on the same page, but Jason is hostile with the group, making things worse and forcing Bethenny to play referee. Emotions are running high with Bethenny's assistant, Julie, who breaks down at a lunch meeting when asked if she is committed to the company for the long haul. Bethenny and Jason get into an explosive argument just as they are about to depart for their couple's therapy boating trip with Dr. Amador; as things escalate, Jason storms off leaving Bethenny and Bryn.
26	5	"Adrift"	March 19, 2012	1.05
Tensions are running high as Jason decides to join Bethenny on the couple's therapy boating trip with Dr. Amador. As they sail further from land, the tide starts to turn just as Bethenny and Jason begin to work together. Jason gets incredibly seasick and is rendered unable to perform his "duty": cooking the meal for the group. Things go from bad to worse when Dr. Amador informs them that they are essentially lost at sea as the boat's GPS system has stopped working. A very worried Bethenny and Jason wait for the tow to arrive to put an end to this fifteen-hour ordeal. Once on dry land, Jason and Bethenny race to the dock to kiss dry land and are reunited with Bryn. The next morning at brunch, Jason proclaims that the overall the trip was worthwhile as it made him realize that no matter how bad things get, he wants Bethenny by his side and with Bethenny, things are never boring!
27	6	"Maternal Instincts"	March 26, 2012	1.14
Life is back to normal and Bethenny and Jason are going full steam ahead on the apartment remodel. Closet space is of the utmost importance to Bethenny so she meets with closet designer. In order for Bethenny to get her dream closet, Jason will have to sacrifice his “man cave”. Bethenny isn’t comfortable asking Jason to give this up but the remodel crew seems to think it will be the best overall decision. The debate is settled while on a walk-through with the entire renovation team, the issue is put to a vote, with the closet coming out on top. Things are never calm for long in Bethenny’s world, as news of her mother's selling a story about her to a gossip magazine really gets Bethenney riled up. Later on Bethenny meets with Dr. Amador and breaks down, admitting that hearing about her mother summons up painful memories.
28	7	"All Da Boats"	April 2, 2012	0.97
Bethenny is getting quite a lot of attention these days, but not all attention is good attention. In one scandal after the next, Bethenny is making headlines. Bethenny realizes she never had this kind of trouble until she made her money, and maybe the saying, "Mo' money, mo' problems", is right! Life must go on so Dwayne, Bethenny’s driver, takes her shopping with one of her interior designers. But even shopping is not a good enough distraction, as Bethenny can’t stop thinking about everything that is going on in the press; she is not a “no comment” kind of girl. After much consideration, Bethenny decides to go on the Today show to clear her name in an interview with Matt Lauer. Bethenny also decides to fly to L.A.. to be a guest on The Ellen DeGeneres Show, ending her week on a high.
29	8	"Who Coordinates the Chaos"	April 9, 2012	1.13
Bethenny takes a serious hit when her assistant, Julie, delivers big news. Bethenny is full of mixed emotions and it causes her to reflect on her extended family and how valuable they are to her...and what better way to celebrate her staff than to do a photo shoot of them all modeling the Skinnygirl Shapewear line. Despite her recent success, Bethenny has trouble letting go of her bargain hunting ways. A furniture shopping trip for her new apartment sends her into a tailspin when she realizes that every time her Upper East Side interior decorator opens her mouth, thousands of Bethenny's hard earned dollars fall out.
30	9	"My Bad Self"	April 16, 2012	1.20
Bethenny gets busy building her brand empire and, in typical Bethenny fashion, has found a way to mix business with pleasure. With her staff in tow, the team heads to Jim Beam to discuss some exciting ideas that are brewing with Skinnygirl Cocktails. Things do not slow down for a moment, as Bethenny learns the hard way that home renovations are no joke and she begins to feel overwhelmed. Things reach a boiling point as she tries to manage everyone and everything in the project and her life but realizes she has become the middle man...or woman, as it were. When her beloved Gina stops by, she can't help but show her true feelings and for a moment Bethenny allows herself to let go. Has the unstoppable Bethenny reached her breaking point?
31	10	"Paradise Found"	April 23, 2012	1.29
Bethenny and Jason arrive at the one and only Pamilla resort in Los Cabos for their extended and much needed vacation. It’s been a tough road up until now but with Bryn and Veronica in tow, they are hoping to relax. But paradise loses a little bit of its glimmer once Bethenny and Jason start talking about past wounds. Fortunately, the rollercoaster ride of their relationship bounces back with a good dose of humor on both their parts. Finally, it’s time for Bethenny’s birthday, a day that goes much better for her than in previous years.
32	11	"Paradise Lost"	April 30, 2012	1.20
A long vacation is just what the doctor ordered for Bethenny and Jason but the ups and downs that come with it are not. On the second leg of their trip, Jason decides that he has waited long enough to break some news about their new apartment and where they may have to live before they can move in. Willing to put themselves out there again, literally, Jason and Bethenny find themselves on yet another boat ride from hell. Bethenny and Jason can’t seem to escape from their own personal issues, and a lengthy discussion about work, life and love forces Jason to face his deepest fears.
33	12	"Grab Your Balloons"	May 7, 2012	1.30
Jason and Bethenny are back in NYC and very much back to the business at hand -- getting their apartment renovated and making sure they have a place to sleep. With Julie leaving, Bethenny wants Jason to come onboard, but every time she tries to push him to make a final decision, there always seems to be a reason not to. With the stress building day-by-day, Bethenny indulges in a little NYC R&R -- a night out with Jake and a yoga class with Nick that has her worried more than ever about his health.
34	13	"Aspen-ational"	May 14, 2012	0.97
Bethenny decides it’s time to give Jason an early Christmas present, but the gift backfires when Jason decides he may not be ready for all that it holds. When Bethenny brings up her obstacles with Jason to Dr. Amador for the first time, she understands it’s time to take a step back and listen. Soon after, Bethenny leaves for the launch of the Skinnygirl Cranberry Cosmo in Aspen. Finally, when the idea of working together rears its ugly head again, Bethenny takes a lesson from Dr. Amador and learns to let Jason come to her instead of the other way around.
35	14	"Unregrettable"	May 21, 2012	1.13
Bethenny must once again face her past when she has dinner with Louis, one her deceased father’s dearest friends. Things heat up at dinner when she has to defend her truth about her childhood and make Louis understand she will not rewrite history.
36	15	"Fair Thee Well Heeled"	May 28, 2012	1.29
Christmas is in the air and the Skinnygirl gang gathers for a holiday party. Julie’s departure from the team approaches, pushing Bethenny over the edge at a Glamour photo shoot. Just as Bethenny and Jason finally move into their new apartment after a hectic renovation, another big life change sends them packing once again.
