= The Big Shot with Bethenny =

American television series

- Genre: Reality competition
- Starring: Bethenny Frankel
- Country of origin: United States
- Original language: English
- No. of seasons: 1
- No. of episodes: 7

Production
- Executive producers: Bethenny Frankel; Mark Burnett; Alex Baskin; Douglas Ross; Barry Poznick; Jaimie Glasson; Brian McCarthy
- Running time: 38-44 minutes
- Production companies: Evolution Media; MGM Television; B Real Productions

Original release
- Network: HBO Max
- Release: April 29 – May 20, 2021

The Big Shot with Bethenny is an American reality competition television series that follows Bethenny Frankel as she searches for the second-in-command to her business empire Skinnygirl and brands. It premiered on April 29, 2021, on HBO Max.

== Plot ==
Bethenny Frankel searches for the second-in-command to her business empire Skinnygirl and other brands.

== Contestants ==
Name	Hometown	Experience	Eliminated
Milokssy Resto	Haverstraw, NY	Management & Operations	Winner Episode 7
Krystin Hargove	Silver Spring, MD	Technology	Runner Up Episode 7
Wendy Cartagena	Pasadena, CA	Project Management	Runner Up Episode 7
Nicole Rose Stillings	New York City, New York	Social Media & Marketing	Episode 6
John Batchelor	New York City, New York	Business COO	Episode 5
Brody El-Achi	New York City, New York	Digital Marketing	Episode 5
Jenna Leveille		Sales	Episode 4
Correy Kaiten		Event Planning	HIRED Episode 3
Ashley Attianese	New York City, New York	Product Development	Episode 1
Mary Gui		Fashion Design & Sales	Episode 1
Ali Fazal		Technology & Human Resources	Episode 1
Ann Legall		PR & Brand Management	Episode 1

== Episodes ==
No.	Title	Original release date
1	"First Impressions Are Everything"	April 29, 2021
2	"Don't Waste My Time"	April 29, 2021
3	"The Only Rules Are My Rules"	May 6, 2021
4	"I Need a Killer"	May 6, 2021
5	"Choose Your Words Wisely"	May 13, 2021
6	"Fake It Till You Make It"	May 13, 2021
7	"It's Not the End, It's Just the Beginning"	May 20, 2021

== Production ==
In February 2020, it was announced Bethenny Frankel would star and executive produce a reality competition series at HBO Max, with MGM Television set to produce and Mark Burnett set to serve as an executive producer. In March 2020, Frankel stated the series was on hold due to the COVID-19 pandemic.

Principal photography on the series commenced by November 2020.

== Reception ==
On Rotten Tomatoes, the series holds an approval rating of 33% based on 6 reviews, with an average rating of 3.4/10.

Daniel D'Addario of Variety gave the series a positive review writing: "As a portrait of what the ruthlessly competitive market for business success and for our eyeballs does to one's sense of generosity and of proportion, The Big Shot with Bethenny is riveting television." Joel Keller of Decider wrote: "Although The Big Shot With Bethenny isn't the dose of pure uncut Bethenny Frankel we want, well take whatever we can get."

Joan Summers of Jezebel panned the series writing: "Faux-feminist torture porn, in which Frankel reigns like a feudal lord eager to sacrifice their starved and overworked serfs." Shannon Keating of BuzzFeed praised Frankel's reality television presence but wrote: "But just because someone's star power gets you in the door doesn't mean you're gonna stick around. if I wasn't reviewing The Big Shot, I doubt I would have made it past a couple episodes.
