= The Real Housewives of New York City season 5 =

The Real Housewives of New York City
- Season 5
- Cover used by iTunes (Left to right) de Lesseps, Radziwill, Thomson, Singer, Drescher, and Morgan
- Starring: LuAnn de Lesseps; Ramona Singer; Sonja Morgan; Aviva Drescher; Carole Radziwill; Heather Thomson
- No. of episodes: 21

Release
- Original network: Bravo
- Original release: June 4 – October 22, 2012

Season chronology
- ← Previous; Season 4 Next → Season 6

The fifth season of The Real Housewives of New York City, an American reality television series, is broadcast on Bravo. It aired June 4, 2012 until October 22, 2012, and is primarily filmed in New York City, New York. Its executive producers are Andrew Hoegl, Barrie Bernstein, Lisa Shannon, Pam Healy and Andy Cohen.

The Real Housewives of New York City focuses on the lives of Luann de Lesseps, Ramona Singer, Sonja Morgan, Aviva Drescher, Carole Radziwill and Heather Thomson. The season consisted of 21 episodes.

Season five marked the first departure of original housewife LuAnn de Lesseps. She eventually returned for the show's seventh season.

== Production and crew ==
The Real Housewives of New York City continued to be a success for the network with season four being its highest rated season among all key demos and averaging 2.65 million total viewers. The series was subsequently renewed after its success and sneak peek of season five was revealed on Watch What Happens Live on April 4, 2012. The full cast, trailer and premiere date were released the following day.

The season premiere "A New New York" was aired on June 4, 2012, while the eighteenth episode "All's Well That Doesn't End Well" served as the season finale, and was aired on October 1, 2012. It was followed by a two-part reunion that aired on October 8, and October 15, 2012 and a "Lost Footage" episode on October 22, 2012, which marked the conclusion of the season. Andrew Hoegl, Barrie Bernstein, Lisa Shannon, Pam Healy and Andy Cohen are recognized as the series' executive producers; it is produced by Ricochet and is distributed by Shed Media.

It was announced on March 10, 2012, that The Real Housewives of New York City would be entering a different platform through the release of a game on Facebook. Real Housewives: The Game was set to run concurrently with the fifth season of The Real Housewives of New York City and each week a new episode would be released on the game. Lisa Hsia, the Executive Vice President for Bravo, described the game as a "great opportunity for Bravo to take our passionate viewers into the content." The game allowed the player to create a character, interact with the housewives and take part in story-lines inspired by the series. The game features all the housewives from season five as well as a cameo from Andy Cohen. The game was discontinued after season five in October, 2012.

== Cast and synopsis ==
=== Cast ===
Three of the seven wives featured in the fourth season returned for the fifth instalment. This was one of the biggest cast changes for The Real Housewives franchise, with four women departing the series. It was revealed that Jill Zarin, Alex McCord, Kelly Killoren Bensimon and Cindy Barshop had all been fired. Upon the firing, Bravo had revealed the departure of the four women was friendly saying "it is a friendly departure among the other ladies and we continue to have ongoing discussions with them." Andy Cohen spoke out on the decision of letting the four women go saying the reason was due to listening to the fans' desires as well as the need for new story-lines and a major change in direction for the series.

The four wives who were fired have since spoken about the series. Soon after Barshop's departure from season four, she revealed that the firing was due to several cast members genuinely not getting along saying "following the reunion it was clear that the women genuinely didn't like each other anymore."

In September 2011, McCord spoke out on her firing on Good Morning America in her first on-screen interview since her firing. McCord spoke negatively of her former cast members and of the series, describing it as toxic as well as questioning the series saying "If people continue to behave in a way that's shocking, then how can it do anything but get darker?"

In May 2012, Bensimon revealed she was expecting to be let go from the series saying "by season four I didn't want to play the game but Bravo was amazing." Despite departing the series prior to season five, Bensimon has continued to guest star throughout the series.

Zarin has been the most vocal since departing the series. In September 2011, Zarin appeared on Good Morning America revealing when the production company called, she said very little. Zarin also describing the feeling at time saying "It was a little jolting. I'll be honest... It didn't feel good." Zarin went on to say the show was toxic and not a good environment for her. During a segment on HuffPost Live in January 2013, Zarin spoke of the series and a possible return saying she would consider returning for a million dollars. In February 2014, during a segment on Oprah: Where Are They Now? Zarin revealed that she wasn't surprised by her firing also saying what she believes was the real reason she was fired. Zarin described the events saying "I think I took a sleeping pill and I typed out an email to my ['Real Housewives'] producer and three out of the five housewives. I said, 'I'm leaving the show. I want to leave on a high. I'm in a good place right now.'" Zarin continued with her story saying "I kind of got cold feet the next day, and I said, 'Ah, that was stupid, I shouldn't have sent that email out.'" LuAnn de Lesseps, a returning wife from season four, announced in June 2016 in an interview with 9News that Zarin was set for a cameo appearance in 2014 during the season but Ramona Singer didn't allow it with de Lesseps saying "Ramona [Singer] found out and she put the kibosh on that. Because Jill had the 'goods' on her... What that means is Jill knew what was going on in Ramona's life."

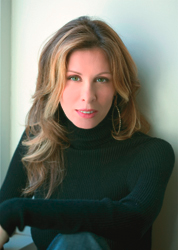
Season five addition, Carole Radziwill

With the four wives' departure, season five of The Real Housewives of New York City saw the introduction of three new housewives; Aviva Drescher, Heather Thomson and Carole Radziwill. Drescher is a survivor of a horrific farm accident when she was six year old, that had her left leg amputated below the knee. Her disability doesn't affect her confidence and she joined the series with hopes to inspire others saying "That's why I'm doing the show, I guess; to let other people, especially women, know that they can feel the same way." Thomson is a highly successful businesswoman and founder of Yummie Tummie. Thomson has spent more than 20 years being a successful stylist to some a-list celebrities, Thomson is also a married mother of two children- Jax, 10, and Ella Rae, 8. Radziwill is a best-selling author and award-winning journalist who has had a long and rewarding career. Radziwill her late husband, Anthony Radziwill, went through a heartbreaking battle with cancer that she depicted in her memoir, What Remains: A Memoir of Fate, Friendship and Love.

=== Synopsis ===
Season 5 of The Real Housewives of New York City begins at a party hosted by Sonja Morgan, to mingle with the three new wives; Aviva Drescher, Heather Thomson and Carol Radziwill. Revelations begins once Singer arrives and Drescher learns that a couple of the returning wives have had previous relations with her husband. During the same party Thomson and Radziwill play the field working out who they can and cannot trust. LuAnn de Lesseps is still annoyed at Singer for her comments about her parenting last seasons and the two butt heads when de Lesseps attempts to discuss it. Singer, Sonja Morgan, Drescher and Thomson head to the Hamptons for the weekend and when they return de Lesseps reveals some shocking news.

Throughout the season, de Lesseps continues to stand strong with her issues with Ramona. The two meet up where to clear the air but de Lesseps is determined to have Singer admit to blackmailing her. Singer attempts to reconcile with de Lesseps at jewelry launch but de Lesseps isn't quite ready to move on. Away from the drama, de Lesseps reveals she's trying to have a baby with her boyfriend when the ladies suspect she partied much later with Td Jacques. De Lesseps finds herself in controversy in St. Barts when the ladies suspect she partied much later with a pirate called Tomas, a hot Johnny Depp look-alike. The next night Tomas turns up to the villa but Singer thinks de Lesseps brought him back the night before. After the trip, some of the ladies question whether de Lesseps has informed Jacques or not on the drama with Tomas.

Singer begins to have issues with Thomson, and invites Radziwill, Drescher and Morgan to lunch to discuss them but Morgan chooses to have a secret rendezvous with de Lesseps instead. Later Singer and Thomson meet, with Singer hoping to receive an invite to London but the conversation takes a turn for the worse. That feud worsens at Drescher's anniversary party when the two come face to face. Singer is determined not to deal with it but Thomson is determined to make Singer listen. Their arguing is a recurring incident throughout the season. With Singer and Drescher not in London, the two ladies bond in New York and Singer is fascinated by Dresher's prosthetic leg.

Morgan deals with the severe water damage caused by Hurricane Irene the year prior. Taking charge of her financial issues, Morgan decides to launch a catering company. Soon after iterating to de Lesseps that singer doesn't control her, during a party Morgan is hosting for her new magazine cover a rift between Morgan and Singer's friendship occurs. Morgan is unhappy with her ex-husband after negotiations of a settlement which makes her realizes she is ready to take further action.

Drescher sets up Morgan with her sex-crazed father in Miami but after meeting him, Morgan states she isn't interested. Drescher hosts an event at Soul Cycle for her charity, which helps children who need prosthetics, but is annoyed at Singer and Morgan who don't show up. After arriving to St. Barts for the trip despite her fear of flying, Drescher is upset when she doesn't receive the welcome she was expecting. The drama between Drescher and Singer escalates on the trip, when Drescher hears Singer complaining to Radziwill that it has turned into a couple retreat with Radziwill's boyfriend and Drescher's husband being there. Back in New York, the two meet to reconcile their differences but it doesn't go as planned. The feud between to reaches a boiling point at Singer's charity event for domestic violence victims. Although Drescher didn't attend the charity event, her dad turned up demanding Singer to apologize to his daughter and it wasn't received well. Singer and Drescher have their final confrontation at Radziwill's book party.

Thomson mixes her business with her personal life when she invites some of the housewives to London for her next business trip but Drescher decides not to attend due to some of her health concerns and phobias. Thomson continues to mix her business with the ladies when she invites Morgan to her office to help with her logo for "Sonja in the City" but things go south very quickly. During the second meeting for the logo, Morgan invites Singer along. Thomson is furious when she hosts a photo shoot for Morgan's toaster oven and she turns up an hour late. The two put the final touches on the toaster oven packaging.

Radziwill is set up on a date by Morgan, it goes well until she learns of his age. During a lunch with Singer, she reveals she is a princess and Singer is elated to know she has one up on de Lesseps' title of being a Countess. In London Radziwill give de Lesseps a lesson in "one-upping" when she gives her a taste of her own medicine. In London, Radziwill opens up to some of the ladies revealing that she and her late husband spent a lot of time there. Radziwill finished writing her book and hosts a trip in St. Barts to celebrate, but once again Drescher reveals her phobia of flying will prevent her from going.

== Episodes ==
The Real Housewives of New York City season 5 episodes
No. overall	No. in season	Title	Original release date	U.S. viewers (millions)
61	1	"A New New York"	June 4, 2012	1.66
Sonja throws a party for the new ladies, Aviva, Carole, and Heather. LuAnn is annoyed at Ramona over her comments about parenting. The new ladies agree to never become mean.
62	2	"Say What You Mean, Just Don't Say It Mean"	June 11, 2012	1.43
LuAnn and Ramona clear the air. Ramona thinks Aviva has been too chatty. Sonja goes missing at a GLAAD event.
63	3	"Boozy Brunch"	June 18, 2012	1.39
Carole hosts a brunch and invites Aviva, Heather, and Sonja. Sonja launches a catering company. Heather invites some of the women to London.
64	4	"Diss-Invite"	June 25, 2012	1.46
Ramona discusses her issues with Heather at lunch with Aviva and Carole, but Sonja snubs the invitation to have a secret meeting with LuAnn. Aviva declines the London invitation; Sonja hosts a party for her new magazine cover.
65	5	"The Cool Girls"	July 2, 2012	1.39
Aviva and Heather discuss the London trip. Aviva asks Sonja to throw her an anniversary party. Ramona and Heather clash when they try to calmly talk about their issues.
66	6	"I'm U.K., You're U.K."	July 9, 2012	1.30
Carole, Sonja and LuAnn arrive in London. The women shop in Notting Hill. Carole lets the ladies in on her life in London after her husband died.
67	7	"Good Trip, Bad Fall"	July 16, 2012	1.39
Sonja, Heather, LuAnn and Carole play croquet. Aviva is concerned by Sonja's lack of party planning. Aviva falls down the stairs at the party.
68	8	"Blinded by the Wine"	July 23, 2012	1.51
London and anniversary discussion over lunch. Sonja works on her branding. Ramona does a blind wine-tasting but isn't told that it's her own wine.
69	9	"Dirty Ol' Dad"	July 30, 2012	1.55
Sonja is set up with Aviva's sex-addicted father, George, but he seems to be eyeing all the ladies. Carole calls out LuAnn for asking a friend to loan her dresses. Aviva asks Sonja how to deal with Ramona.
70	10	"You Want to What Me in the Where?"	August 6, 2012	1.44
Ramona invites everyone but Heather to dinner. A drunken Sonja confronts Jacques and LuAnn about some very personal issues.
71	11	"This Party Is Toast"	August 13, 2012	1.65
Carole hosts a "White Elephant" party. Sonja arrives late to a photo shoot and angers Heather. Carole invites the ladies on a vacation to St. Barth's.
72	12	"All How You Spin It"	August 20, 2012	1.65
Aviva hosts a charity event, but Ramona and Sonja don't show. Aviva tells Carole she is afraid of flying.
73	13	"Pirate Booty Call"	August 27, 2012	1.82
The ladies arrive at St. Barth's. LuAnn parties later than the others after a night out at Le Ti.
74	14	"Slutty Island"	September 3, 2012	1.93
Ramona tries to figure out who LuAnn brought back to the villa. The ladies spend the day on a yacht. Aviva doesn't get as warm a welcome at St. Barts as she wanted.
75	15	"Vacation, All I Never Wanted"	September 10, 2012	1.80
Ramona gets frustrated when the trip starts to favor couples. Sonja and Ramona don't attend Russ's concert.
76	16	"What Happens in St. Barths Doesn't Stay in St. Barths"	September 17, 2012	1.99
Back home, Ramona invites Sonja and LuAnn to a friend's house. A dinner does not go as planned.
77	17	"Don't Make Room for Daddy"	September 24, 2012	1.70
Aviva's father comes back to town. Sonja wants to take further legal action against her ex-husband. Heather has a special request for Aviva.
78	18	"All's Well That Doesn't End Well"	October 1, 2012	1.83
Heather throws a charity event, but the night turns chaotic. Ramona and Sonja make a scene at Heather's event. Carole's book party turns confrontational.
79	19	"Reunion — Part 1"	October 8, 2012	1.70
Hosted by Andy Cohen, part one of the reunion brings the housewives together to rehash this season's drama.
80	20	"Reunion — Part 2"	October 15, 2012	1.72
The reunion continues as the housewives discuss the catfights and confrontations from the past season.
81	21	"The Lost Footage"	October 22, 2012	0.93
Bravo opens up the fault to air unseen footage from the season.
