= Bethenny & Fredrik =

American reality television series

- Genre: Reality television
- Starring: Bethenny Frankel; Fredrik Eklund
- Country of origin: United States
- Original language: English
- No. of seasons: 1
- No. of episodes: 8

Production
- Executive producers: Bethenny Frankel; Brent Montgomery; David George; Fredrik Eklund; Jason Hollis; Jordana Hochman; Will Nothacker
- Running time: 21 minutes
- Production companies: B Real Productions; Leftfield Pictures

Original release
- Network: Bravo
- Release: February 6 – March 20, 2018

Bethenny & Fredrik is an American reality television series that premiered on Bravo on February 6, 2018. The show chronicled Bethenny Frankel and Fredrik Eklund's friendship and business partnership as they came together as real estate moguls.

== Episodes ==
No.	Title	Original release date	US viewers (millions)
1	"Bethenny & Fredrik Inc."	February 6, 2018	0.87
2	"The Proof Is in the Porcelain"	February 6, 2018	0.69
3	"Hitting the Pavement"	February 13, 2018	0.71
4	"Tribecalvania"	February 20, 2018	0.71
5	"Beach Retreat"	February 27, 2018	0.80
6	"He Said, She Said"	March 6, 2018	0.71
7	"The Finish Line"	March 13, 2018	0.78
8	"All About the Benjamins"	March 20, 2018	0.84
