= Skinnygirl =

American lifestyle brand

- Current logo for Skinnygirl
- Type: Private
- Industry: Low-calorie alcohol, food & beverage; Formerly; Clothing and garments; Diet supplements; Kitchen appliances
- Founded: 2009; 17 years ago in New York City, United States
- Founder: Bethenny Frankel; David Kanbar
- Key people: Bethenny Frankel (CEO)
- Products: Cocktails; Wine; Vodka; Popcorn; Salad dressing; Preserves; Coffee pods
- Parent: Suntory Global Spirits (Skinnygirl Cocktails)
- Website: skinnygirlproducts.com skinnygirlcocktails.com

Skinnygirl is an American lifestyle and consumer brand founded by entrepreneur and television personality Bethenny Frankel in 2009. Skinnygirl began as a low-calorie ready to drink margarita. After Beam Global (now Suntory Global) acquired the brand's cocktail line in 2011, Frankel expanded the brand's market products to include innerwear, skin care, weight supplements, popcorn, and jeans, amongst others.

In 2025, Skinnygirl's products, which currently consist of low-calorie alcohol, popcorn, salad dressing, fruit preserves, and coffee pods collectively earned $1 billion in retail sales.

== History ==
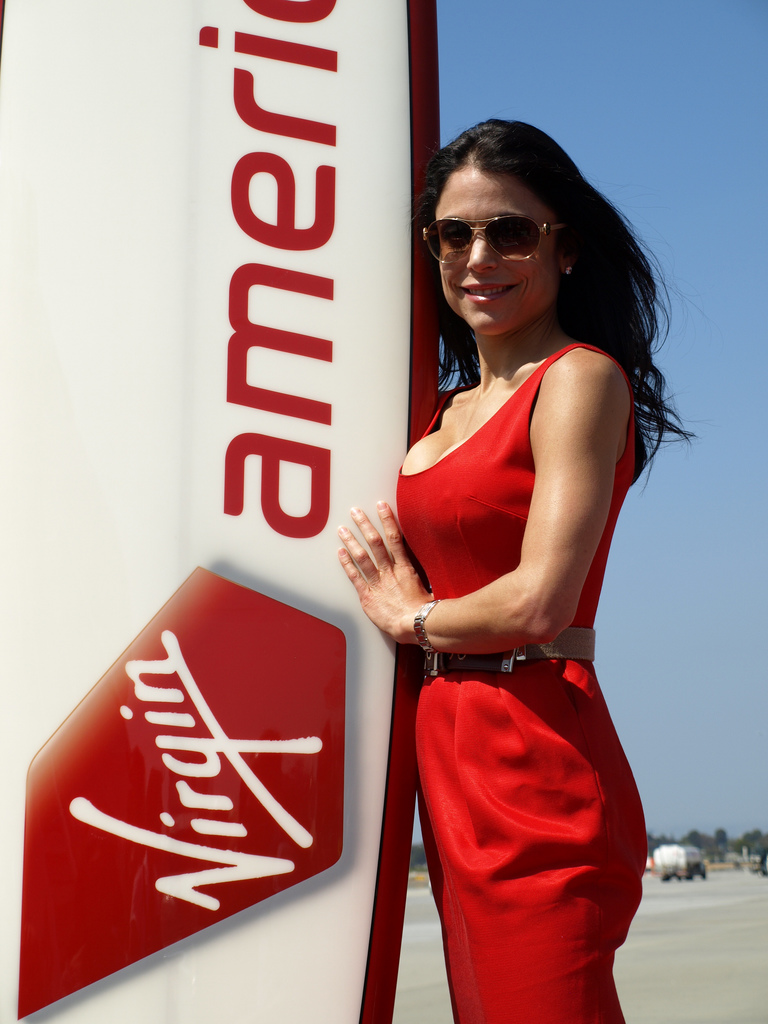
Skinnygirl founder Bethenny Frankel, April 2009

In September 2008, Bethenny Frankel, then, a natural food chef, mixologist, and series regular on the Bravo reality series The Real Housewives of New York City, announced she would be debuting her creative recipe for her 100-calorie Skinny Girl Margarita, which had previously been featured on the show. Subsequently, she announced she had created a line of Skinnygirl Cocktails and formed a deal with Frangelico to create the Skinny Girl Fragnelini. In April 2009, Frankel announced Skinnygirl would launch in-stores in June, officially unveiling the bottled Skinnygirl Margarita at the Montauk Yacht Club on August 8.

By April 2010, the margarita mix was sold nationwide in grocery and liquor stores. Within the first 18 months of its launch, Skinnygirl Cocktails had become one of the largest ready-to-drink cocktail brands in the United States, and ranked fourth in the same category in grocery, drug, and liquor stores for 13 weeks between November 2010 and February 2011, ultimately shipping 160,000 cases for $14.99 a bottle. In March 2011, The Wall Street Journal reported Fortune Brands' subsidiary Beam Global Spirits & Wine had acquired the Skinnygirl brand under a multiyear agreement for a reported $100-120 million, also confirming David Kanbar, who previous co-founded the brand, would no longer be a co-owner. Frankel retained the brands rights to sell anything other than alcohol.

In early March 2011, Frankel announced the expansion of the Skinnygirl label with the launch of the innerwear and lingerie collection, Skinnygirl Shapers, the brands' first non-alcoholic product which was expected to generate $3 million in first-year sales. Skinnygirl Daily, a line of nutrition weight supplements, launched in June and exceeded $1 million in wholesale orders in the first quarter of 2011. In November, the brands skin care lines, Skinnygirl Face & Body Solutions, and Skinnygirl Mommy, respectively, both premiered in Walmart.

In February 2012, Beam Inc. announced Skinnygirl would be adding vodka and wine to the catalogue. In April, Skinnygirl Cocktails ranked #1 on The Five Fastest Growing Sprits Brands after the company grew 388.3% in 2011. In May, Skinnygirl introduced their "Drink like a Lady" tagline and campaign, and launched internationally (in Australia) in the summer. In November 2013, Frankel announced the brand's first non-alcoholic beverage line, Skinnygirl Sparklers, a sparkling water and fruit juice concoction co-developed with Arizona Beverages.

In January 2014, TGI Fridays announced a partnership with Skinnygirl Naked Vodka to sell their own "Skinny cocktail." In February, global manufacturer SodaStream announced it had formed a deal with Skinnygirl to "co-develop a family of better-for-you flavors" for the beverage sweeteners, Skinnygirl Sweeteners. In October, Frankel partnered with Orville Redenbacher's to create Skinnygirl Popcorn. The same month, Frankel announced Skinnygirl would introduce cooking appliances, the first being a blender which premiered on QVC and in-stores in November.

In 2016, Frankel launched Skinnygirl Candy, a line of Belgian chocolates, at Dylan's Candy Bar in New York City. In 2017, Frankel launched Skinnygirl Market Fresh Deli, a low-calorie deli meat line with no nitrates and reduced sodium. In January 2018, Frankel announced the brand's denim line Skinnygirl Jeans. Skinnygirl Jeans sold out on HSN and was officially unveiled at Macy's Herald Square and their stores nationwide in September. In 2019, Frankel partnered with VirMax to sell Skinnygirl Supplements in 5,000 Walgreens stores. In 2020, Frankel launched the sugar-free Skinnygirl Preserves.

In 2022, Inc. reported Skinnygirl's annual revenue was $50 million. Affiliate deals with Amazon (which exclusively sell the shapewear line) generated $20 million in shipping revenue in 2025, while the overall brand cumulatively reached $1 billion in retail sales the same year.

== Criticism and controversy ==
When the Skinnygirl Margarita was reviewed by Lauren Shockey of The Atlantic in September 2010, Shockey questioned the brand's health claims and criticized the brand's name, saying it reinforced gender stereotypes.

On September 1, 2011, The Huffington Post wrote that the organic grocery chain Whole Foods Market had pulled the Skinnygirl Cocktail lines from its shelves due to ingredients the grocer considered unnatural, specifically sodium benzoate. While this was initially denied by Beam Global, Whole Foods released the statement: "[Skinnygirl] had been offered in 16 of Whole Foods Market 310 stores. After discovering that it contains a preservative that does not meet our quality standards, we have had to stop selling it." The same month, a California woman filed a $5 million class action lawsuit claiming Frankel and Beam Global made deceptive claims regarding Skinnygirl's alcoholic ingredients.

== Products ==
Year	Product	Genre	Status	Ref
2011	Skinnygirl Shapers	Innerwear, lingerie	Discontinued	
2011	Skinnygirl Daily	Nutrition weight supplement	Discontinued	
2011	Skinnygirl Face & Body Solutions	Skin care	Discontinued	
2011	Skinnygirl Mommy	Postpartum skin care	Discontinued	
2012	Skinnygirl Solutions	Shapewear	Discontinued	
2012	Skinnygirl Bath Collection	Body care	Discontinued	
2013	Skinnygirl Sweeteners	Liquid sweeteners	Discontinued	
2013	Skinnygirl Sparklers	Sparkling beverage	Discontinued	
2014	Skinnygirl Water Enchancers	Liquid flavoring	Discontinued	
2014	Skinnygirl Supplements	Weight management supplement	Discontinued	
2014	Skinnygirl Fresh & Frozen	Chip dip	Discontinued	
2014	Skinnygirl Popcorn	Popcorn	Active	
2014	Skinnygirl by Bella	Blender	Discontinued	
2015	Skinnygirl Salad Dressings	Salad dressing	Active	
2015	Skinnygirl Protein	Nutrition shakes and bars	Discontinued	
2016	Skinnygirl Candy	Belgian chocolate	Discontinued	
2017	Skinnygirl Market Fresh Deli	Lunch meat	Discontinued	
2018	Skinnygirl Jeans	Denim	Discontinued	
2020	Skinnygirl Flavored Coffee Pods	Coffee pods	Active	
2020	Skinnygirl Preserves	Fruit preserves	Active	
