= Bethenny Frankel =

American entrepreneur and TV personality (born 1970)

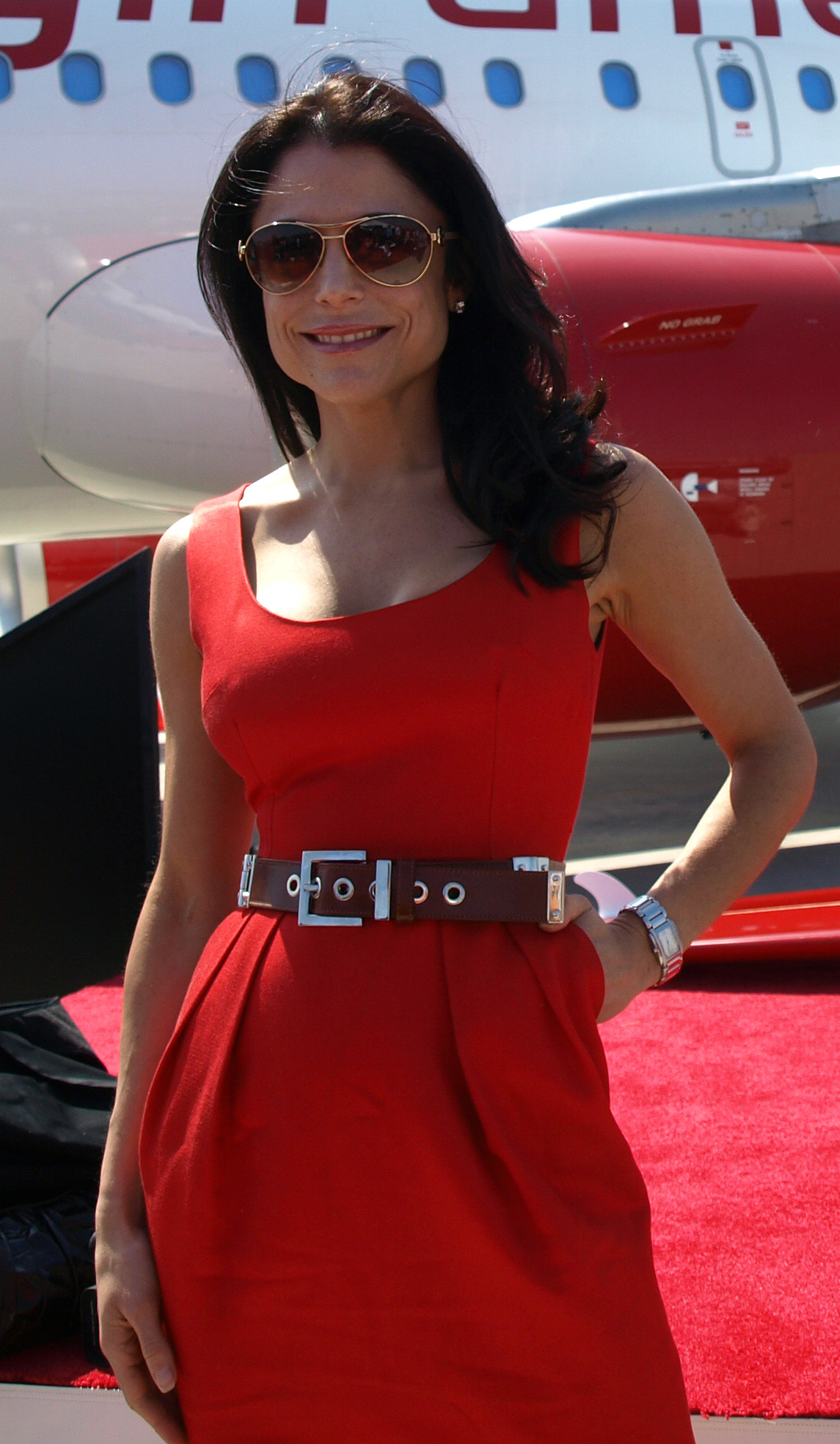
- Frankel in 2009
- Born: November 4, 1970 (age 56); Queens, New York, U.S.
- Education: Boston University; New York University (BA); Natural Gourmet Institute
- Occupations: Entrepreneur; television personality; philanthropist; author; actress
- Years active: 1993–present
- Notable work: Skinnygirl Founder and CEO
- Spouses: Peter Sussman (m. 1996; div. 1997) Jason Hoppy (m. 2010; div. 2021)
- Children: 1
- Father: Robert J. Frankel
- Website: bethenny.com

Bethenny Frankel (born November 4, 1970) is an American entrepreneur, television personality, philanthropist, and author. After appearing on the NBC reality competition series The Apprentice: Martha Stewart in 2005, where she was the runner-up, Frankel increased her profile on the Bravo reality series The Real Housewives of New York City (2008–2010, 2015–2019). Frankel propelled her fame in 2009 when she founded Skinnygirl, a lifestyle brand. In 2011, Forbes reported the success of Skinnygirl earned Frankel $55 million, leading her to rank at #42 on the annual Forbes Celebrity 100.

Frankel's spin-off series Bethenny Ever After aired three seasons from 2010 to 2012, and Bethenny & Fredrik aired one season in 2018. She also headlined the Fox daytime talk show Bethenny (2013–2014) and the HBO Max reality competition series The Big Shot with Bethenny (2021). She also founded BStrong, a philanthropic organization that has provided disaster relief. She has written ten books, hosted five podcasts, and is a YouTuber.

== Early life ==
Frankel is the only child of Robert J. Frankel, a horse trainer, and Bernadette (Verderosa) Birk, an interior designer and college professor. Her father was German Jewish, whereas her mother was Italian Catholic and converted to Judaism. Her parents divorced when Frankel was four years old. One year later, her mother married horse trainer John Parisella and Bethenny was raised Roman Catholic. Her godmother was Eleanor Mogavero. She completed the sacraments of communion and confirmation. Frankel describes her childhood as difficult. Frankel says her mother "was always drinking" and often argued violently with her stepfather.

Frankel originally grew up in Forest Hills, New York, but moved many times and attended multiple schools before attending boarding school. She went to St. Agnes Cathedral School in Rockville Centre, New York, and Holy Child Academy in Old Westbury, New York, but graduated in 1988 from Pine Crest School in Fort Lauderdale, Florida. She attended Boston University for two years, and graduated with a degree in psychology and communications from New York University.

== Career ==
=== Early career and television ===
In 1992, Frankel moved to Los Angeles with hopes of being an actress. While she landed some small acting roles, she worked as an assistant to Kathy Hilton, sometimes taking her daughters Paris and Nicki out for ice cream or picking them up from school. She was also a personal assistant to Jerry Bruckheimer and Linda Bruckheimer. During this time, Frankel also worked as a production assistant on the set of Saved by the Bell. Frankel used these connections to start her first company, called In Any Event, a party-planning business, which was short-lived. Her next entrepreneurial enterprise was Princess Pashmina, a business selling pashmina scarves she bought wholesale from an Indian manufacturer.

Frankel began her career as a natural food chef in 2001, later enrolling at the Natural Gourmet Institute in New York City. In 2003, Frankel started BethennyBakes, a baking business that made egg-free, wheat-free, and dairy-free cookies and provided meal delivery in New York City. It was featured on The Apprentice: Martha Stewart, a reality competition series, in 2005, in which Frankel was the first runner-up to the competition winner. BethennyBakes closed in 2006. In 2011, Frankel became a spokesperson for a low-calorie Pepperidge Farms line of bread.

In 2008, Frankel began starring in the reality television series The Real Housewives of New York City, which premiered in March on Bravo. In June 2010, Frankel appeared in the Bravo reality series Bethenny Getting Married? (later retitled Bethenny Ever After), which documented her engagement and marriage to Jason Hoppy as well as the birth of their daughter. The series premiere was Bravo's highest-rated at the time, garnering 2.1 million viewers. In September 2010, Frankel announced her exit from The Real Housewives of New York City following its third season. In November, she competed in the reality competition series Skating with the Stars and finished in second place.

Frankel taped the pilot of a talk show, Bethenny, in June 2011. The syndicated daytime talk show was created and co-produced by Ellen DeGeneres. It had a test run in 2012 in limited markets, and officially premiered in September 2013. It was canceled in February 2014 after one season, although episodes continued to run because 170 had been taped. Frankel rejoined The Real Housewives of New York City for its seventh season, which premiered in April 2015. In 2016, Forbes, who previously dubbed Frankel the "it girl" of reality television, reported that Frankel was the sixth highest-paid reality star. In May 2017, ABC announced Frankel would guest judge on their business series Shark Tank during the show's ninth and tenth seasons.

In March 2019, Deadline Hollywood reported Frankel had signed a deal with MGM Television and its chairman, Mark Burnett, to produce and star in future unscripted television projects. In August of the same year, Frankel announced her departure from The Real Housewives of New York City. In 2020, Frankel starred in the HBO Max reality competition series titled The Big Shot with Bethenny, which she also co-produced alongside Burnett. The series featured "aspiring business moguls compete for a job on Frankel's executive team." The show underperformed, and in June 2021, Frankel announced she no longer had a deal with MGM Television.

In 2022, the Jewish Journal named Frankel one of "The Top 10 Jewish Reality TV Stars of All Time".

=== Skinnygirl ===
Frankel created a pre-packaged margarita mix line named Skinnygirl Margarita in 2009. Skinnygirl was sold nationwide by April 2010, and landed Frankel a spot on Forbes' "10 Reality Stars Turned Entrepreneurs" list. This was the foundation product for Skinnygirl Cocktails. The cocktail line was sold to Beam Global for a reported $120 million in 2011. According to Forbes, Skinnygirl's success earned Frankel $55 million by May 2011, leading her to become the cover of the annual Forbes Celebrity 100 issue of that year, where she ranked at #42.

Retaining the rights to sell anything other than alcohol, Frankel kept the Skinnygirl brand name to sell a variety of foods including low-calorie dips, shakes, candy, deli meat, sweeteners, , popcorn, and salad dressings. The brand later expanded to supplements, skin and body care, apparel and denim line and cookware, which were respectively sold across the Home Shopping Network, Macy's, Walmart, TJMaxx, and Marshalls.

=== Authorship ===
In March 2009, Frankel's book, Naturally Thin: Unleash Your SkinnyGirl and Free Yourself from a Lifetime of Dieting, was published. The Skinnygirl Dish: Easy Recipes for Your Naturally Thin Life, was published in December of the same year. In spring 2010, she released an exercise DVD, Body by Bethenny, and an audiobook, The Skinnygirl Rules, which summarized her two prior books. In 2011, Frankel published A Place of Yes: 10 Rules for Getting Everything You Want Out of Life. In December 2012, she published a novel, Skinnydipping. She published five additional books including a children's book and additional self-help books.

=== Other business ventures ===
While appearing on Shark Tank in 2017, Frankel partnered with entrepreneur Kevin O'Leary to invest $150,000 for 25% equity of the beverage company Snarky Tea.

In 2024, Frankel developed her French rosé brand Forever Young, her first alcoholic endeavor since selling the Skinnygirl Cocktail line in 2011. Around the end of 2025, Frankel launched a private dating platform called The Core.

Following many years of various collaborations with many different companies and products, in June 2026, Frankel acquired a stake in haircare brand dpHUE and joined the company as chief brand officer, overseeing brand strategy, product innovation, marketing, consumer education, and retail expansion.

In August 2026, Frankel opened her first café, Supermodel Café, in East Quogue, New York. The pop-up café sold a menu developed in partnership with Goldberg's Famous Bagels, including coffee drinks, bagels, chicken salad, and various other dips and spreads.

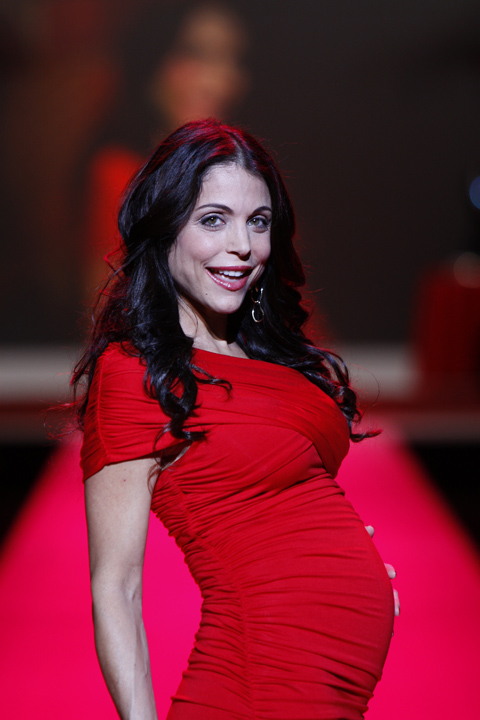
Frankel, with child, at The Heart Truth Fashion Show in 2011

=== Philanthropy and activism ===
In September 2009, Frankel posed nude for PETA's anti-fur campaign, "I'd Rather Go Naked Than Wear Fur."

Frankel is the founder of BStrong, a philanthropic arm originally formed to assist women, which has increasingly participated in disaster relief around the world. In 2017, the organization raised $300,000 in donations and supplies for the victims of Hurricane Harvey, after which Frankel visited Houston, Texas, to distribute these items. In the same year, Frankel traveled to Mexico City and Jojutla, Mexico, following the Puebla earthquake to raise awareness for the disaster's recovery efforts, for which BStrong also raised $150,000. Also in the same year, Frankel chartered four planes to Puerto Rico and distributed medical supplies, food, water, and hygiene products in assisting with Hurricane Maria relief efforts. Her philanthropic efforts produced her partnership with Global Mission Empowerment (GEM).

In light of the COVID-19 pandemic, BStrong raised funds and delivered personal protective equipment such as masks, goggles, gowns, and sheets to hospitals in the U.S. During the 2022 Russian invasion of Ukraine, Frankel supported Ukraine by supplying 100,000 relief kits; equaling out to $10 million in aid, and raising $20 million in donations.

In the wake of the 2023 SAG-AFTRA and WGA strikes, Frankel called for reality television personalities to go on strike and to unionize. She stated that reality television personalities are subject to exploitation and intense scrutiny and deserve increased protection and worker's rights. Frankel's proposals for a union would call for reality television personalities to earn residual-like payments, a minimum wage of $5,000 per episodic appearance with a raise for each season, retrospective compensation, and the freedom to quit filming at any time without risking financial penalty. Frankel has enlisted attorneys Bryan Freedman and Mark Geragos to investigate the problematic treatment of reality television personalities.

In 2025, Frankel, with BStrong, supported the victims of the Southern California wildfires with her distribution of cash cards of $1,500 to help victims with hotel housing and the renewing of their lives, in addition to raising $24 million in donations.

== Personal life ==
In a November 2022 episode of her podcast, Just B with Bethenny Frankel, Frankel described her religious identity: "I grew up with a stepfather who was Catholic, so I also went to church. I've had a sort of mutt upbringing of religion and thus ended up not being religious at all but being spiritual and cultural. So culturally, many people would think that I am Jewish. I have a last name that's Jewish. I have family that's Jewish. I am Jewish." During that same podcast, she criticized musical artist Kanye West for antisemitic comments he had recently made.

Frankel was married to entertainment executive Peter Sussman from 1996 to 1997. She was engaged two times between her first and second marriages. In March 2010, she married pharmaceutical sales executive Jason Hoppy. They have one daughter, Bryn Casey, born in New York City. After the couple separated in December 2012, Frankel filed for divorce in January 2013. A temporary custody agreement was reached in June 2014, followed by a financial settlement in July 2016. However, due to ongoing litigation over child custody, Frankel and Hoppy's divorce was not finalized until January 2021.

Frankel dated banker Dennis Shields from 2016 to August 2018, when Shields was found dead of an apparent accidental overdose of pain medication after back surgery. Although Shields proposed to Frankel in April 2018 and she wore his engagement ring, the relationship was off-again, on-again for its duration. She met film producer and commercial real estate developer Paul Bernon on a dating app in 2018 and they were engaged in 2021, but Frankel said she ended the relationship after nearly six years because she was not happy.

== Filmography ==
=== As herself ===
Year	Title	Notes
2005	The Apprentice: Martha Stewart	Runner-up; 13 episodes
2008–2010, 2015–2019	The Real Housewives of New York City	Main cast; seasons 1–3, 7–11
2009	Z Rock	Episode: "I Wanna Be Z Dated"
2010–2012	Chelsea Lately	Guest; various episodes
2010	Skating with the Stars	Runner-up; 6 episodes
2010–2021	The Ellen DeGeneres Show	Guest; various episodes
2010–2012	Bethenny Ever After	Main cast
2013–2014	Bethenny	Host
2016, 2018	The Real Housewives of Beverly Hills	Guest; seasons 6 and 8
2016	Beat Bobby Flay	Guest judge; season 10
2017	Million Dollar Listing New York	Guest
2017–2019	Shark Tank	Guest shark; 5 episodes
2017	Bethenny & Fredrik	Main cast
2018	Bar Rescue	Episode: "Operation: Puerto Rico"
2021	The Big Shot with Bethenny	Herself
2022	Beat Bobby Flay	Guest host; episode: "Fancy Pants"
2022	Money Court	Host

=== As actress ===
Year	Title	Role	Notes
1993	Soiree Sans Hors D'Oeuvres	Woman	Minor role
1994	Hollywood Hills, 90028	Laura Drake	Lead role
1995	Wish Me Luck	Bridgette	
2013	The Neighbors	Jill	Episode 21: "Mo Purses Mo Money Mo Problems"
2024	Danger in the Dorm	Joanne	Lead role

== Podcasts ==
Year	Title	Role	Notes	Ref
2020	9 to 5ish with theSkimm	Guest		
2020–present	JustB	Host		
2022–2024	ReWives	Host		
2022–2026	Rants	Host		
2023	BetheNeNe	Co-host	with NeNe Leakes	
2024	Just B Divorced	Host		
2024–present	Just B Dating	Host		
2025	The Toast	Guest co-host	with Claudia Oshry	

== Bibliography ==
- Naturally Thin: Unleash Your SkinnyGirl and Free Yourself from a Lifetime of Dieting (ISBN 978-1416597988, 2009)
- The Skinnygirl Dish: Easy Recipes for Your Naturally Thin Life (ISBN 978-1416597995, 2009)
- The Skinnygirl Rules: For Getting and Staying Naturally Thin (ISBN 978-1442300507, 2010)
- A Place of Yes: 10 Rules for Getting Everything You Want Out of Life (ISBN 978-1439186916, 2011)
- Skinnydipping: A Novel (ISBN 978-1451667387, 2012)
- Skinnygirl Solutions: Simple Ideas, Extraordinary Results (ISBN 978-1451667400, 2014)
- Cookie Meets Peanut (ISBN 978-0316368438, 2014)
- Skinnygirl Cocktails: 100 Fun & Flirty Guilt-Free Recipes (ISBN 1476773025, 2014)
- I Suck at Relationships So You Don't Have To: 10 Rules for Not Screwing Up Your Happily Ever After (ISBN 978-1451667424, 2016)
- Business is Personal: The Truth About What it Takes to Be Successful While Staying True to Yourself (ISBN 978-0306827044, 2022)
