= Bethenny (talk show) =

American syndicated talk show (2012–2014)

- Genre: Talk show
- Created by: Bethenny Frankel; Ellen DeGeneres
- Presented by: Bethenny Frankel
- Theme music composer: Sirens of Soho
- Opening theme: "Calling All My Girls"
- Country of origin: United States
- Original language: English
- No. of seasons: 1
- No. of episodes: 170

Production
- Executive producers: Bethenny Frankel; Ellen DeGeneres; Meghan Schaefer Spielberg; Terence Noonan
- Running time: 42 minutes
- Production companies: A Very Good Production; Telepictures Productions

Original release
- Network: Syndication
- Release: June 11, 2012 – July 4, 2014

Bethenny is an American syndicated television talk show that was hosted by Bethenny Frankel, who also served as co-producer and creator with Ellen DeGeneres. The series debuted as a summer test run on June 11, 2012, on six stations owned by Fox Television Stations. It premiered nationwide across the United States and Canada starting on September 9, 2013.

== Production ==
The idea to bring Frankel to talk television had been in the planning stages in 2011, but disagreements over the series' concept and failure to clear the show in major television markets resulted in the project being shelved that November. In January 2012, however, the project was revived when the Fox Stations group approached Warner Bros. Television about testing the show out as a summer replacement for some of the syndicated programs that were cancelled or had ended production.

The summer test showed promising results. Warner Bros. Television announced that once the show finished its six-week test run, it would put the show on hiatus and syndicate it nationally in fall 2013. On July 6, 2012, Warner Bros. Television announced Bethenny was cleared by the entire Fox Television Stations Group, well ahead of its September 2013 launch. In some markets, the show was used to replace the cancelled Anderson Live, which was also distributed by Warner Bros. Television.

In Canada, the show airs on CMT with air times varying by market to allow for simsubbing.

On February 14, 2014, Bethenny was cancelled due to a loss of affiliate clearances to NBC Universal Domestic Television Distribution's upcoming The Meredith Vieira Show. Despite the "final show" airing in May 2014, new episodes continued to air until July 4, 2014.

== Ratings ==
Ratings for the series were fair. Though the series did not place first in ratings since its September 2013 relaunch, the show opened with a 0.9 rating. Bethenny averaged a 0.9 household rating, ranking No.14 among talk shows above only The Arsenio Hall Show, The Test, and Trisha, all of whom were also cancelled in May 2014 along with Bethenny.
