= Carole Radziwill =

American journalist (born 1963)

Carole Radziwiłł
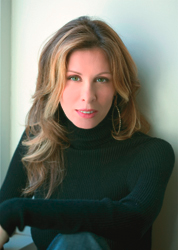
- Radziwiłł in 2005
- Born: Carole Ann DiFalco; August 20, 1963 (age 63); Suffern, New York, U.S.
- Education: Hunter College (BA); New York University (MBA)
- Occupations: Journalist; writer; television personality
- Years active: 1986–present
- Spouse: Anthony Radziwiłł (m. 1994; died 1999)
- Family: Radziwiłł family

Carole Ann Radziwiłł (Polish pronunciation: [raˈd͡ʑiviww]; née DiFalco; born August 20, 1963) is an American journalist, writer, and television personality. Radziwill, best known for appearing on the Bravo reality series The Real Housewives of New York City from 2012 to 2018 and again in 2026, first worked as a journalist and producer for ABC News from 1986 to 2002. Her reporting earned her three Emmy Awards, a Peabody Award, and a GLAAD Media Award.

She is the widow of Prince Anthony Radziwiłł, whom she was married to from 1994 up until his death in 1999. In 2005, Radziwiłł published her memoir called What Remains: A Memoir of Fate, Friendship and Love which became a New York Times Best Seller.

== Early life and education ==
Carole Ann DiFalco was born in Suffern, New York, on August 20, 1963, the daughter of Anthony (1939–2026) and Helen DiFalco. She has three brothers and two sisters. She is of Italian descent. She earned a B.A. in English at Hunter College and an M.B.A. at New York University.

== Career ==
Radziwiłł began her career in journalism in 1986, first interning at ABC News in postproduction and reporting for ABC World News Tonight. Soon after, she began producing stories for 20/20, Primetime Live, and DayOne. She later joined Peter Jennings' documentary unit, Peter Jennings Reporting, mostly covering abortion and gun control. She covered foreign policy on location in Haiti, Cambodia, and India; participating in fieldwork along the Thai-Cambodian border involving filming in refugee camps and interactions with Khmer Rouge Soldiers. In 1991, Radziwill was stationed in Israel to report on the Persian Gulf War and later traveled with Israeli military personnel to film the aftermath of Saddam Hussein's SCUD missile attacks.

For six weeks in 2001, Radziwiłł, along with the 101st Airborne Division in the U.S. military base in Kandahar, Afghanistan, embedded during the early stages of the U.S. invasion following the September 11 attacks whilst creating the ABC documentary, Profiles from the Front Line. In 2002, Radziwill departed from ABC to write her book.

In September 2005, Radziwiłł published her first memoir, What Remains: A Memoir of Fate, Friendship, and Love, published by Charles Scribner's Sons. The memoir, which chronicled the marriage, death, and aftermath of her late husband Anthony Radziwill, spent 12 weeks on The New York Times Best Sellers list and was praised by Oprah Winfrey and Jeannette Walls. In 2006, she became a contributor for Glamour Magazine with a monthly column entitled "Lunch Dates", in which she would have lunch with celebrities and interview them; her interviewees included Rudolph Giuliani, Prince Andrew, and Alec Baldwin.

In 2011, Radziwiłł was approached to join the fifth season of the Bravo network reality series, The Real Housewives of New York City. In February 2014, Radziwiłł published her first novel, A Widow's Guide to Sex and Dating, which was published by Henry Holt and Company. The novel follows 34-year-old writer Claire Byrne as she navigates the death of her older husband. Radziwiłł departed from Real Housewives of New York City after the show's tenth season in July 2018. She has since written articles for Cosmopolitan, Departures, and Porter magazine; including collaborative profiles on Olivia Wilde, Mariah Carey, and Kim Kardashian.

In July 2025, Radziwill launched her weekly newsletter, The Voice of Reason with Carole Radziwill, on Substack. In March 2026, it was announced that Radziwiłł would return to The Real Housewives of New York City for the sixteenth season.

== Personal life ==
Radziwiłł met television executive and son of Polish nobleman Stanisław Albrecht Radziwiłł and socialite Caroline Lee Bouvier, Anthony Radziwill, while they were both working as producers at ABC. They married on August 27, 1994, at Most Holy Trinity Church in East Hampton, New York. Prior to the wedding, he had been diagnosed with sarcoma, a rare cancer. He died of cancer on August 10, 1999, at New York-Presbyterian Hospital, aged 40. They had no children.

Radziwiłł began dating songwriter Russ Irwin in 2012, appearing in the music video for his song "Manhattan." In February 2013, Radziwill confirmed she and Irwin had broken up. In 2014, Radziwill started dating chef Adam Kenworthy. The pair dated on and off before announcing their split in 2017.

Following the arrest of socialite Ghislaine Maxwell for sex trafficking, images of Radziwiłł with Maxwell surfaced online, as well as emails between her and Maxwell dating back to 2005. Radziwiłł has stated she was "friendly" with Maxwell in the 2000s, but has not spoken with her in nearly two decades, having last seen her at the screening for the 2009 film Amelia.

Radziwiłł appears in the Epstein files, although she has maintained her stance of not knowing Jeffrey Epstein.

== Awards and accolades ==
Throughout her career, Radziwiłł has won three Emmy Awards for her journalism, including her work on peace advocate Bobby Muller's campaign against landmines in Cambodia. In 1990, she received the Peabody Award for her work on Peter Jennings Reporting: Guns. She is also a recipient of the Robert F. Kennedy Humanitarian Award. In 2000, Radziwiłł received the GLAAD Media Award for Outstanding TV Journalism for her profile on Billy Bean.

== Published works ==
- Radziwill, Carole (September 26, 2005) What Remains: A Memoir of Fate, Friendship, and Love. Charles Scribner's Sons. (ISBN 978-0743276948)
- Radziwill, Carole (February 11, 2014) The Widow's Guide to Sex and Dating: A Novel. Henry Holt and Company. (ISBN 978-0805098846)
