= E-boat =

German navy's fast attack craft of World War II

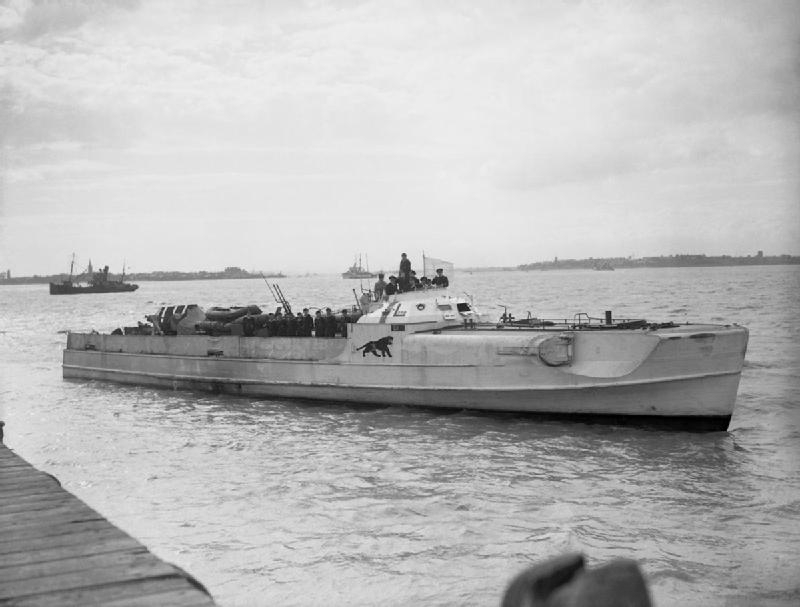
- An E-boat flying the white flag, after surrender at the coastal forces base HMS Beehive, Felixstowe, May 1945

Class overview
- Name: E-boat (German: S-boot)
- Builders: Lürssen, Vegesack; Schlichting-Werft, Travemünde; Galați shipyard and Constanța Shipyard, Romania (~20 boats re-assembled)
- Operators: Spanish Civil War; Spanish Navy (Nationalist); World War II; Kriegsmarine; Royal Yugoslav Navy; Regia Marina; Royal Romanian Navy; Royal Danish Navy; Royal Norwegian Navy; Republic of China Navy; Royal Navy; German Navy; Spanish Navy; Post-War; People's Liberation Army Navy; Polish Navy
- Succeeded by: Jaguar class (post-war)
- Completed: S-1: 1 unit (Schnellboot 1930) S-2: 4 units (Schnellboot 1931) S-7: 7 units (Schnellboot 1933) S-14: 4 units (Schnellboot 1934) S-18: 8 units (Schnellboot 1937) S-26: 4 units S-30: 16 units (Schnellboot 1939) S-38: 58 units (Schnellboot 1939/40) S-38b: S-100: 81 units S-151: 8 units
- Canceled: 259
- Preserved: 1

E-boat was the Western Allies' designation for the fast attack craft (German: Schnellboot, or S-Boot, meaning "fast boat"; plural Schnellboote) of the Kriegsmarine of Nazi Germany during World War II; E-boat could refer to a patrol craft from an armed motorboat to a large Torpedoboot. The name of E-boats was a British designation using the letter E for Enemy.

The main wartime production boats, from S26 onwards (but often designated the S100 class), were very seaworthy, heavily armed and capable of sustaining 43.5 knots (80.6 km/h; 50.1 mph), briefly accelerating to 48 knots (89 km/h; 55 mph). These were armed with torpedoes and Flak guns; commonly one 37 mm at the stern, one 20 mm at the bow with a twin mount amidships, plus machine guns. Armament varied and some S26 class boats substituted a 40mm Bofors or, less commonly, a 20mm flakvierling (quadruple mount) for the aft 37mm cannon.

The S26 class boats – which provided the bulk of the wartime deliveries – were 34.94 m (114 ft 8 in) long and 5.38 m (17 ft 8 in) in beam. Their diesel engines provided a range of 700 to 750 nmi (810–860 mi; 1,300–1,390 km), substantially greater than the gasoline-fueled American PT boats and British motor torpedo boats (MTBs).

As a result of early war experience of combat against the fast and powerful S-boats, the Royal Navy created its motor gunboat (MGB) force and later developed better-matched MTBs, using the Fairmile 'D' hull design.

== History ==
=== Development ===
This design was chosen because the theatre of operations of such boats was expected to be the North Sea, English Channel and the Western Approaches. The requirement for good performance in rough seas dictated the use of a round-bottomed displacement hull rather than the flat-bottomed planing hull that was more usual for small, high-speed boats. The shipbuilding company Lürssen at Vegesack, Bremen, overcame many of the disadvantages of such a hull and, with the private motor yacht Oheka II in 1926, produced a craft that was fast, strong and seaworthy. It was also very light, being constructed of wooden planking over alloy frames. This attracted the interest of the Reichsmarine, which in November 1929 ordered a similar boat but fitted with two torpedo tubes. This became the S1, and was the basis for all subsequent E-boats.

After experimenting with the S1, the Germans made several improvements to the design. Small rudders added on either side of the main rudder could be angled outboard to 30 degrees, creating at high speed what is known as the Lürssen Effect. This drew in an "air pocket slightly behind the three propellers, increasing their efficiency, reducing the stern wave and keeping the boat at a nearly horizontal attitude". This was an important innovation as the horizontal attitude lifted the stern, allowing even greater speed, and the reduced stern wave made E-boats harder to see, especially at night.

The rounded wood planking hull helped reduce weight, and flattened at the stern area, the aft section area was reduced at high speeds, it allowed more hydrodynamic lift.

==== Layout ====
The internal layout of the E-boat remained the same for all types. Its length was generally divided by eight transverse bulkheads (made of 4mm steel below the waterline and slightly thinner light metal alloy above) into nine watertight compartments. From bow to stern, these were:

1. Containing a trimming tank, the anchor chain storage locker, forward "head" (WC) and crew washroom;
2. the accommodation for senior ratings (six bunks, including one in a separate curtained-off compartment for the coxswain);
3. comprising the captain's cabin on the starboard side, and the radio room on the port side;
4. the two forward fuel tanks (capacity 2 x 3,000 litres), one on either side of a centreline walkway, located directly below the bridge;
5. the forward engineroom, housing the two wing engines, still with a central walkway between them;
6. the second engineroom held the engine driving the central shaft, with a walkway on each side, flanked next to the hull by auxiliary machinery;
7. the two largest of the fuel tanks (each of capacity 3,150 litres), again on either side of a central walkway, with a third (smaller) tank of 1,490 litres below the deck;
8. the junior ratings' accommodation, with bunks for fourteen men, plus the galley and the stern "head"; the boat's magazine was also in this compartment;
9. the two aft fuel tanks (capacity 2 x 2,000 litres) and rudder gear.

The earliest (shorter) boats lacked the first transverse bulkhead, and thus the senior ratings' accommodation was included in the first watertight compartment.

==== Personnel ====
The earliest six boats had a crew of 12 men, but by the time of the S7 and S14 types (S7 to S25) this had increased to 18. The S26 class required a complement of between 21 and 24 men, and this remained generally constant for all subsequent boats (except the ex-Italian and KS and LS boats). This comprised a commanding officer (usually an Oberleutnant zur See), a Chief Boatswain (Oberbootsmann), a Helmsman (Matrosen-Gefreiter), about six seamen including those operating semaphore and engine telegraph posts (Matrosen), a Chief Engineer (Obermaschinist), three engineer NCOs (Maschinenmaaten), six engine-room ratings (usually Heizer), two radio operators (Funkgefreiter or Funkgast) for radio communications including decoding, and a torpedo mechanic (Torpedomechanikergefreiter) who doubled as the boat's cook.

Crew members could earn the Schnellbootkriegsabzeichen — denoted by a badge depicting an E-boat passing through a wreath. The criteria were good conduct, distinction in action, and participating in at least twelve actions. It was also awarded for particularly successful missions, displays of leadership or being killed in action. It could be awarded under special circumstances, such as when another decoration was not suitable.

=== Operations with the Kriegsmarine ===
E-boats were primarily used to patrol the Baltic Sea and the English Channel in order to intercept shipping heading for the English ports in the south and east. As such, they were up against Royal Navy and Commonwealth, e.g., Royal Canadian Navy contingents leading up to D-Day, motor gunboats (MGBs), motor torpedo boats (MTBs), motor launches, frigates and destroyers. They were also transferred in small numbers to the Mediterranean, and the Black Sea by river and land transport. Some small E-boats were built as boats for carrying by auxiliary cruisers.

E-boats were organisationally under the command of the Seekriegsleitung or SKL (the naval warfare command, responsible for the planning, execution and direction of naval warfare), and were administratively organised into flotillas, each originally comprising 8 boats. Consequently most orders for new construction were placed in batches of eight boats, or of multiple of eight. The first half-flotilla (1st Schnellbootshalbflotille) was formed in July 1932, but was reorganised as 1st Schnellbootsflotille in June 1935. A second flotilla was established in August 1938, and a third in 1940. Eventually there were fourteen operational flotillas, numbered 1st to 11th plus 21st, 22nd and 24th, together with three training flotillas (Schnellbootsschulflotille). Each flotilla required the backup of a depot ship; initially this was provided by the converted steamer Nordsea, but from 1934 a series of purpose-built tenders were commissioned - the Tsingtau in 1934, followed by the Tanga (in 1939), Carl Peters and Adolf Lüderitz in 1940, and finally the Herman von Wissmamm and Gustav Nachtigal.

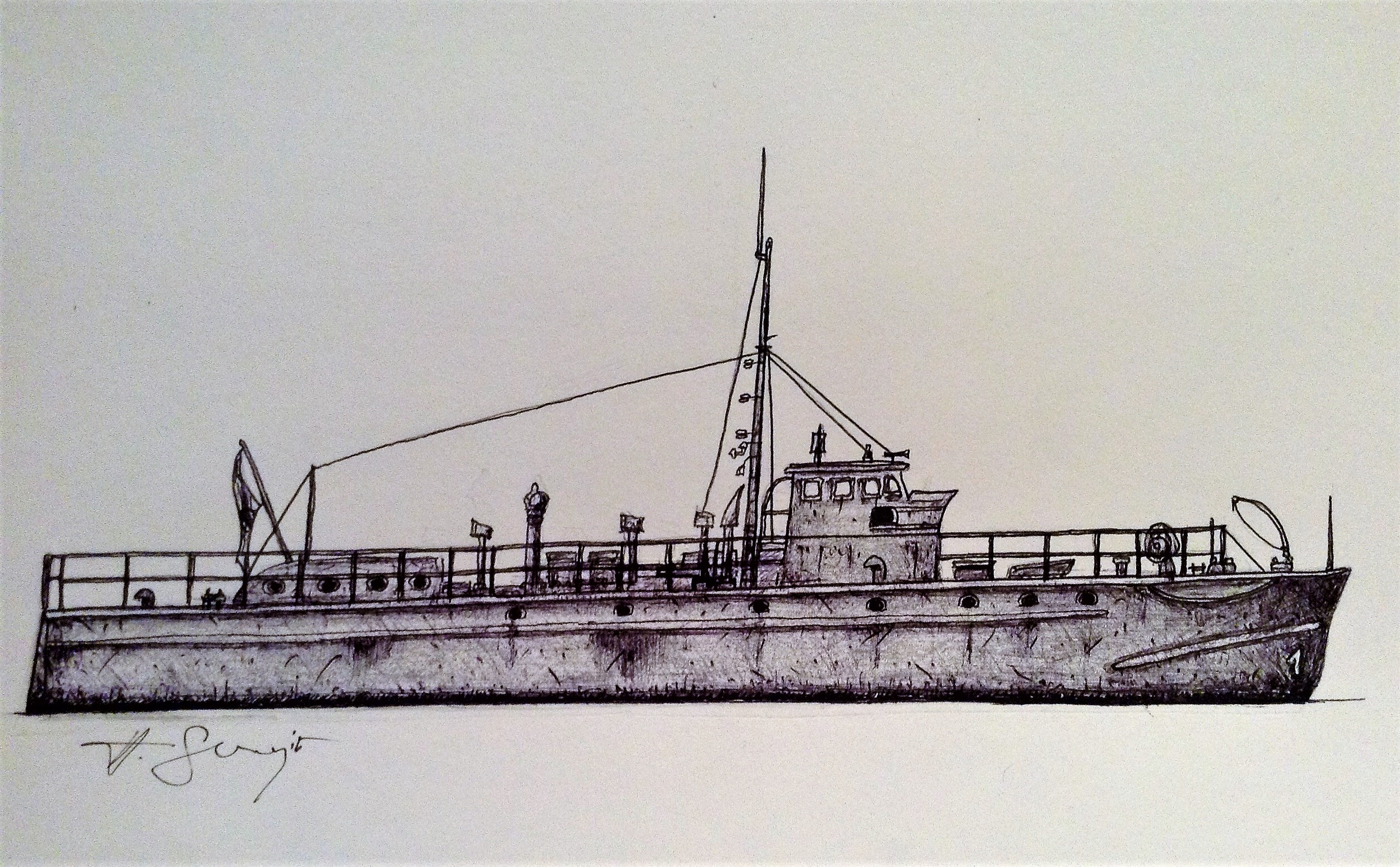
Schnellboot S1

E-boats of the 6th & 9th flotillas from Cherbourg attacked Exercise Tiger on 28 April 1944, causing about 749 American Army and Navy casualties.

The E-boats of the 9th flotilla were the first naval units to respond to the invasion fleet of Operation Overlord. They left Cherbourg harbour at 5 a.m. on 6 June 1944. On finding themselves confronted by the entire invasion fleet, they fired their torpedoes at maximum range and returned to Cherbourg.

During World War II, E-boats claimed 101 merchant ships totalling 214,728 tons. Additional claims include 12 destroyers, 11 minesweepers, eight landing ships, six MTBs, one torpedo boat, one minelayer, one submarine, and a number of smaller craft such as fishing boats. They also damaged two cruisers, five destroyers, three landing ships, one repair ship, one naval tug, and numerous other merchant vessels. Sea mines laid by the E-boats sank 37 merchant ships totalling 148,535 tons, a destroyer, two minesweepers, and four landing ships.

E-boat crews were awarded 23 Knight's Crosses of the Iron Cross and 112 German Crosses in Gold.

==== Operations in the Black Sea ====
To boost Axis naval strength in the Black Sea, the OKW ordered to the region the transfer of six E-boats of the 1st S-flotilla, the last to be released from action in the Baltic Sea before refit. The Romanian port of Constanța, in the Black Sea, was chosen as the S-flotilla's headquarters. Transporting the six boats overland from Germany to Romania was an impressive logistical feat. The superstructure and all weapons were removed, leaving only the hull. After a long road journey of 60 hours, the boats arrived at Ingolstadt, Germany, where they were transferred back to water and towed towards Linz, Austria. There the superstructure was rebuilt, then the journey continued down the Danube to Galați, where the main engines were installed. The E-boats then continued on their own power towards Constanța, where refitting was completed.

The first two boats, S26 and S28, arrived in Constanța on 24 May 1942, the second pair, S72 and S102 on 3 June, and the final pair, S27 and S40 10 days later. After the sinking of S27 by a malfunctioning torpedo, four more reserve boats, S47, S49, S51 and S-52 were dispatched to the Black Sea, in order to replace boats undergoing maintenance. S28, S72 and S102 were soon relegated to the Constanța Shipyard for engine replacement, leaving only S26 and the newly commissioned S49 operational. On 1 January 1944, the 1st S-flotilla numbered six operational boats: S26, S42, S47, S49, S52 and S79, while S28, S40, S45 and S51 were all out of commission, undergoing repair in Constanța. Three more boats were shipped down the Danube and were being reconstructed at Constanța. On 1 June 1944, 8 boats were operational in Constanța: S28, S40, S47, S49, S72, S131, S148 and S149. The boats were however penned in harbor, due to fuel shortage. During July, S26, S28, S40 and S42 were transferred to Sulina at the mouth of the Danube, where S42 was fitted with a new propeller. They were joined by S72 in early August, the rest of the boats remaining in Constanța. On 19 August, S26, S40 and S72 were destroyed in port by a Soviet air attack. On 22 August S148 hit a mine and sank near Sulina, and on the following day, S42, S52 and S131 were destroyed in Constanța by a Soviet air attack. What remained of the S-flotilla was disbanded after Romania switched sides on the same day.

=== Yugoslav Navy ===
Eight E-boats were built by Lürssen, Vegesack for the Yugoslav Navy from 1936 to 1939. These were named Orjen, Durmitor, Suvobor, Kajmakcalan, Velebit, Dinaira, Rudnik and Triglav. Each measured 28.00 (overall)/27.70 (waterline) x 4.46 x 1.51 m (91 ft 10in/90 ft 10in x 14 ft 4in x 4 ft 11in) and 51 tonnes standard (61.7 tonnes full load). Three Daimler-Benz BF2 petrol engines of 1,100 hp each = 3,300 hp = 33 kts, while they carried 5.8 tonnes of petrrol to give them a radius of 265 nmiles @ 33 knots. Each carried two 550mm torpedo tubes, a 40mm gun and 16 men. Kajmakcalan and Durmitor escaped to Alexandria in April 1941 to join the Allies; the other six fell into Italian hands and became Ms41 to Ms46, four of them eventually captured by the Germans and refitted with standard 533 mm torpedoes (see below under "S2 class").

=== Italian MS boat ===
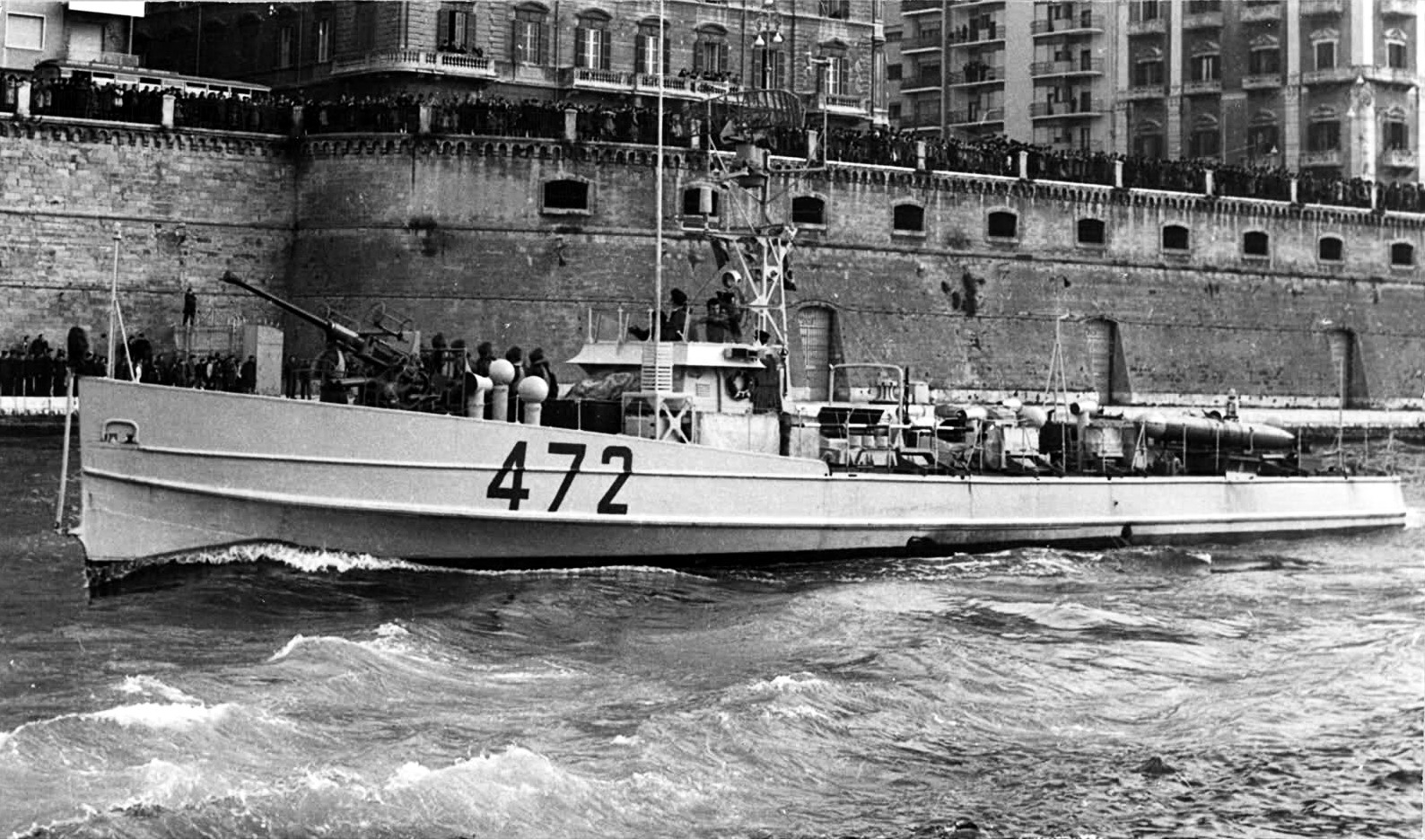
Italian MS 472, post-war configuration

The poor seaworthiness of the Italian-designed MAS boats of World War I and early World War II led its navy to build its own version of E-boats, the CRDA 60 t type, classed MS (Motosilurante). The prototype was designed on the pattern of the six German-built E-boats captured from the Yugoslav Navy in 1941. Two of them sank the British light cruiser HMS Manchester in August 1942, the largest warship to be sunk by fast torpedo craft in the Second World War. After the war these boats served with the Italian Navy, some well into the 1970s.

=== Spanish Navy ===
The Kriegsmarine supplied the Spanish Francoist Navy with six E-boats (S1 to S6) in December 1936 during the Spanish Civil War, and sold six more (S73, S78, S124, S125, S126 and S134) to them in 1943 during the Second World War. Another six were built in Spain with some assistance from Lürssen. A motor boat of the early series, either the Falange or the Requeté, laid two mines off Almería that crippled the British destroyer HMS Hunter on 13 May 1937. The German-built boats were discarded in the 1960s, while some of the Spanish-built ones served until the early 1970s.

=== China ===
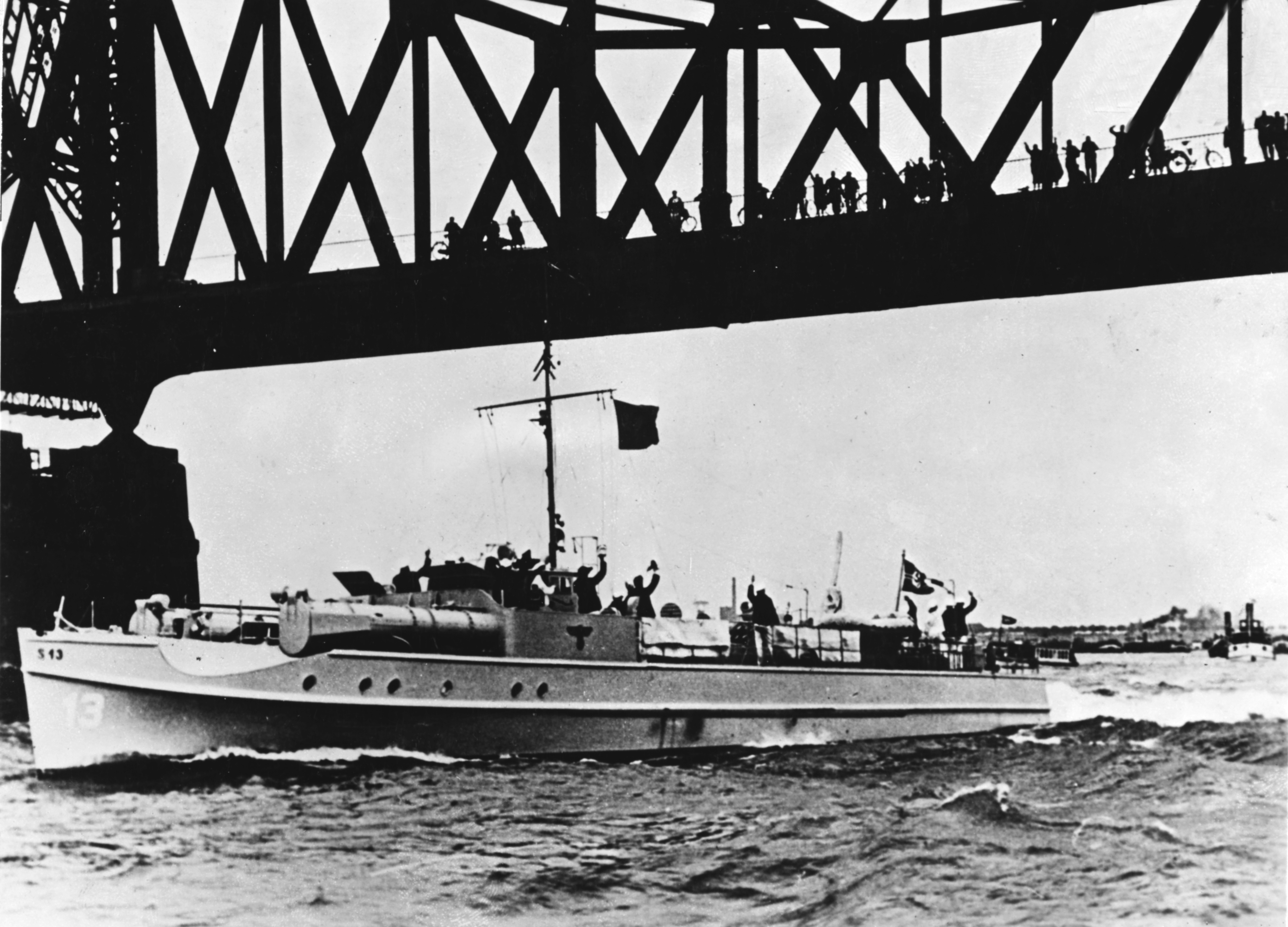
This is one of the S-7-class boats, S-13. The Chinese Navy operated three boats of this class.

The Chinese Nationalist Navy had three S7-class boats during the Second Sino-Japanese War.

- Yue-22 (岳-22)
- Yue-253 (岳-253)
- Yue-371 (岳-371)

Yue-22 was destroyed by Japanese planes, Yue-371 was sunk by its sailors to avoid being captured by the Japanese soldiers, and Yue-253 was captured by the People's Liberation Army during the Chinese Civil War. Yue-253 was renamed "Hoiking" (海鯨), meaning "Seawhale" in Chinese. The People's Liberation Army Navy used it as a patrol boat until 1963.

The Chinese Nationalist government also ordered eight E-boats and a tender, Qi Jiguang (戚繼光). These were all taken over while under construction by the Kriegsmarine in 1939. The E-boats had MB502 diesels and were shorter (by 2.18m) than the standard S26 design of boats. They were re-numbered as S30 to S37, while the Qi Jiguang was renamed Tanga.

=== Romanian Navy ===
Germany sold four E-boats to Romania on 14 August 1944. These vessels displaced 65 tons, had a top speed of 30 knots generated by three Mercedes-Benz engines totalling 2,130 kW (2,850 hp) and were armed with two 500 mm (19.685 in) torpedo tubes. Each of the four boats had a crew of 25. They were numbered 10 to 13 (formerly S151, S152, S153 and S154) and served in the Romanian Navy until at least 1954.

=== Post-war service ===
==== Royal Navy ====
At the end of the war about 34 E-boats were surrendered to the British. Three boats, S130 (renamed P5230), S208 (P5208) and S212 (P5212) were retained for trials.

===== Operation Jungle =====
The Gehlen Organization, an intelligence agency established by American occupation authorities in Germany in 1946 and manned by former members of the Wehrmacht's Fremde Heere Ost (Foreign Armies East), used the Royal Navy's E-boats in order to infiltrate its agents into the Baltic states and Poland. Royal Navy Commander Anthony Courtney was struck by the potential capabilities of former E-boat hulls, and John Harvey-Jones of the Naval Intelligence Division was put in charge of the project. He discovered that the Royal Navy still had two E-boats, P5230 and P5208, and had them sent to Portsmouth, where one of them, P5230 (ex-S130), was modified to reduce its weight and increase its power with the installation of two Napier Deltic engines of 1,900 kW (2,500 hp) each.

Lieutenant-Commander Hans-Helmut Klose was assigned to command a German crew, recruited by the British MI6 and funded by the American Office of Policy Coordination. The missions were assigned the codename "Operation Jungle". The boats carried out their missions under the cover of the British Control Commission's Fishery Protection Service, which was responsible for preventing Soviet navy vessels from interfering with German fishing boats and for destroying stray mines. The home port of the boats was Kiel, and operated under the supervision of Harvey-Jones. Manned by Klose and his crew, they usually departed for the island of Bornholm waving the White Ensign, where they would hoist the Swedish flag for a dash to Gotland, and there they would wait for orders from Hamburg. The first mission consisted in the landing of Lithuanian agents at Palanga, Lithuania, in May 1949, and the last one took place in April 1955 in Saaremaa, Estonia. During the last two years of the operation, three new German-built motorboats replaced the old E-boats. Klose was later assigned the command of a patrol boat in the Bundesmarine and became commander-in-chief of the fleet before his retirement in 1978.

==== Royal Danish Navy ====
In 1947, the Danish navy bought twelve former Kriegsmarine boats. These were further augmented in 1951 by six units bought from the Royal Norwegian Navy. The last unit, the P568 Viben, was retired in 1965.

==== Royal Norwegian Navy ====
After World War II, the Norwegian Navy received a number of former Kriegsmarine boats. Six boats were transferred to Denmark in 1951.

=== Operators ===
- Nazi Germany
- West Germany
- Kingdom of Italy
- Romania
- Spain
- Republic of China
- United Kingdom
- Denmark
- Norway
- China

== Survivor ==
There is just one surviving E-boat, identified as S130. It was built as hull No. 1030 at the Schlichting boatyard in Travemünde. S130 was commissioned on 21 October 1943 and took an active part in the war, participating in the Exercise Tiger attack and attacks on the D-Day invasion fleet.

According to Dutch military historian Maurice Laarman:

In 1945, S130 was taken as a British war prize (FPB 5030) and put to use in covert operations. Under the guise of the "British Baltic Fishery Protection Service", the British Secret Intelligence Service MI-6 ferried spies and agents into Eastern Europe. Beginning in May 1949, MI-6 used S208, (Kommandant Hans-Helmut Klose) to insert agents into Lithuania, Latvia, Estonia, and Poland. The operations were very successful and continued under a more permanent organisation based in Hamburg. In 1952, S130 joined the operation and the mission was enlarged to include signal intelligence (SIGINT) equipment. In 1954/55, S130 and S208 were replaced by a new generation of German S-boote.

S130 was returned to the newly formed Bundesmarine in March 1957, and operated under the number UW 10. Serving initially in the Unterwasserwaffenschule training sailors in underwater weaponry such as mines and torpedoes, she later became a test boat under the name EF 3.

S130 was on display in Wilhelmshaven, Germany, having formerly been used as a houseboat.

S130 was purchased and towed from Wilhelmshaven to the Husbands Shipyard, Marchwood, Southampton, England in January 2003, under the auspices of the British Military Powerboat Trust. In 2004, S130 was taken to the slipway at Hythe, where, under the supervision of the BMPT, she was prepared and then towed to Mashfords yard in Cremyll, Cornwall, England to await funding for restoration. In 2008, S130, having been purchased by the Wheatcroft Collection, was set up ashore at Southdown in Cornwall to undergo restoration work involving Roving Commissions Ltd. In July 2020, S130 was still awaiting restoration, with the intention that upon completion it would be a museum-ship at the Richmond dry docks in Bideford, Devon.

== Variants and vessels ==
The Schnellboot design evolved over time. The first groups had a pair of torpedo tubes fitted on the foredeck, but from S26 onwards the forecastle had been raised so that the torpedo tubes were built into the structure.

=== S1 ===
The first post-WW1 torpedo boat was ordered in November 1929 to be built by Lürssen at Vegesack, near Bremen, in 1930 as their Yard No. 12120, using mahogany and light metal composite. Originally numbered as UZ(S)16, it was commissioned into the Reichmarine on 7 August 1930. It was renamed W1 on 31 March 1931, and then as S1 on 16 March 1932. It measured 26.8 x 4.2 x 1.06 metres (87 ft x 13 ft 9in x 3 ft 6in) and had a displacement of 39 tons standard (50 tons full load). Powered by three Daimler-Benz BF2 12-cylinder 900 hp petrol engines on three shafts, with a rating of 2,700 bhp, it had a sustained speed of 34.2 knots (maximum 39.8 knots). It carried two 500mm (19.685 inch) torpedo tubes and one 20mm flak gun. It had a complement of 12 (later 18) men. Along with the next five boats (S2 to S6), it was stricken on 10 December 1936 and sold to Spain as Badajoz (renamed LT15 in 1939).

The number S1 was re-used in 1939. Five boats had been ordered by Bulgaria from Lürssen, Vegesack, of which the first four were delivered as F1 to F4. The fifth boat was retained in Germany and given the number S1. These were petrol-engined boats, similar to the S2 class built for the Kriegsmarine. Although commissioned in 1939, its petrol engines gave frequent problems, and on 10 September 1940 its stern was rammed (by S13) in Vlissingen, and was later removed from active service.

=== S2 class ===
The first production of the E-boat in 1931, a lengthened version of the prototype S1. The first two were ordered from Lürssen on 28 April 1931 and the other two on 16 July 1931. Each measured 27.95 x 4.2 x 1.06 metres (91 ft 8in x 13 ft 9in x 3 ft 6in) and had a displacement of 46.5 tons standard (58 tons full load). Powered by Daimler-Benz petrol engines on three shafts, with a rating of 3,300 bhp, they had a speed of 33.8 knots. Armament and men as in S1. They formed a "Half Flotilla" and were used for training crews for later E-boats; all were stricken on 10 December 1936 (along with S1) for transfer to Spain.

Number	Builder	Launched	Commissioned	Fate
S2	Lürssen, Vegesack	1 December 1931	22 April 1932	Sold to Spain 10 December 1936, renamed Falange (LT13)
S3	Lürssen, Vegesack	10 December 1931	27 May 1932	Sold to Spain 10 December 1936, but never commissioned there
S4	Lürssen, Vegesack	11 June 1932	20 June 1932	Sold to Spain 10 December 1936, renamed Requete (LT11)
S5	Lürssen, Vegesack	1932	14 July 1932	Sold to Spain 10 December 1936, renamed Oviedo (LT12)

The numbers S2 to S5 were re-used in 1943. Eight petrol-engined boats similar to the original S2 class had been ordered from Lürssen, Vegesack, and completed in 1937-39 for that navy as Orjen, Durmitor, Suvobor, Kajmakcalan, Velebit, Dinaira, Rudnik and Triglav. When Italy occupied Yugoslavia in April 1941, two of them (Durmitor and Kajmakcalan) escaped to Alexandria and served with the Allied forces, while the other six were commissioned into the Italian Navy as Ms41 to Ms46. In September 1943 Ms41 (ex Orjen) at Monfalcone and Ms45 (ex Suvobor) at Cattolica were scuttled, while the other four were captured by the Germans on 9 September and renamed S2 (ex Velebit), S3 (ex Dinara), S4 (ex Triglav) and S5 (ex Rudnik); all four were scuttled by the Germans at Salonika in October 1944.

=== S6 ===
The first diesel-powered boat was also ordered from Lürssen, Vegesack on 28 August 1932. Its dimensions and other details were the same as for S7 to S9. It was stricken and sold to Spain on 10 December 1936 (together with the preceding petrol-engined boats) and renamed Toledo (renamed LT14 in 1939 and stricken in 1942).

=== S7 class ===
Built from 1933 onwards. Similar to S6, but with an improved hull form, these were the first operational diesel boats. The first three, ordered (together with S6) on 26 August 1932, were fitted with MAN L7 19/30 diesels on three shafts giving a speed of 36.5 knots and measured 75.8 tonnes standard (95 tonnes full load), while the last four - ordered on 20 July 1932 - were equipped with the more reliable Daimler-Benz MB502 diesels of 3,960 hp to produce 35 knots, and were 78 tonnes standard (92 tonnes full load). They had a fuel capacity of 10.5 tonnes, giving them a radius of 600 miles @ 30 knots. All measured 32.36 x 5.06 x 1.36 m (106 ft 2in x 16 ft 6in x 4 ft 6in) except that S10 to S13 had a draught of 1.42m (4 ft 8in). These carried the larger 533mm (21-inch) torpedoes rather than the 500mm of the petrol-driven boats; two torpedo tubes were mounted on the forecastle, and the boats also carried a single 20mm MgC/30 gun, with a crew of 18 (later 21) men.

Number	Builder	Launched	Commissioned	Fate
S7	Lürssen, Vegesack	24 February 1934	10 October 1934	Transferred to UK in May 1945, scuttled in the North Sea 2 May 1946.
S8	Lürssen, Vegesack	23 January 1934	6 September 1934	Converted to fast submarine hunter on 11 September 1940, transferred to UK in 1945, but scuttled in the North Sea on 17 May 1945
S9	Lürssen, Vegesack	24 February 1934	12 June 1935	Converted to fast submarine hunter on 5 August 1940, transferred to Norway in July 1945, sunk 18 January 1946 in the North Sea,
S10	Lürssen, Vegesack	26 August 1934	7 March 1935	To USA in 1945; transferred to Norway in 1945, scrapped 1950
S11	Lürssen, Vegesack	24 October 1934	3 August 1935	Transferred to USSR on 5 November 1945 as TK-1002, scrapped in later 1940s.
S12	Lürssen, Vegesack	18 February 1935	31 August 1935	Transferred to Norway in July 1945, sunk 18 January 1946 in the North Sea
S13	Lürssen, Vegesack	29 March 1935	7 December 1935	Transferred to Britain in May 1945, sold and scrapped.

=== S14 class ===
Improved S7 type, ordered on 16 July 1934 (first two) and 5 November 1935 (last two) with new MAN L11 (11-cylinder) engines producing 6,150 hp, which proved unsatisfactory. Enlarged hull, measuring 34.62 x 5.26 x 1.67 m (113 ft 7in x 17 ft 3in x 5 ft 6in) and displacing 92.5 tonnes standard (105.4 tonnes full load). After S17 was broken up, the surviving three boats were transferred to the Fast A/S Group in 1940.

Number	Builder	Launched	Commissioned	Fate
S14	Lürssen, Vegesack	23 January 1936	12 June 1936	Converted to fast tug, but sunk in the Bristol Channel in 1944.
S15	Lürssen, Vegesack	15 February 1936	27 February 1937	Transferred to US Navy post-war, but given to Denmark in July 1947 as T46 and broken up there.
S16	Lürssen, Vegesack	7 April 1937	22 December 1937	Transferred to USSR on 13 February 1946 as TK-1003, scrapped 1950 or later.
S17	Lürssen, Vegesack	29 July 1937	18 March 1938	Decommissioned 8 September 1939 following heavy storm damage on 4 September off Heligoland, and scrapped.

=== S18 class ===
Built from 1937 onwards. Two new boats were ordered on 21 December 1936 (S18 and S19) and six more boats (S20 to S25) on 29 December 1937. Almost identical to the S14 class, but with 3 Mercedes Benz MB501 engines (of total 6,000 hp) instead of MAN engines. The bridge, which had been in front of the wheelhouse on earlier designs, was raised to the wheelhouse roof to increase all-round visibility.

Number	Builder	Launched	Commissioned	Fate
S18	Lürssen, Vegesack	13 January 1938	14 July 1936	Rebuilt as fast tug boat 1942, sunk by bombing 5 May 1945.
S19	Lürssen, Vegesack	10 May 1938	6 October 1938	Transferred to Britain post-war, sunk as target ship 1950.
S20	Lürssen, Vegesack	1 October 1938	21 March 1939	Transferred to Britain post-war, scrapped 1948.
S21	Lürssen, Vegesack	1 August 1938	19 December 1938	Transferred to Norway in 1945, scrapped 1950.
S22	Lürssen, Vegesack	31 January 1939	16 May 1939	Sunk at Wilhelmhaven by British bombing 30 March 1945.
S23	Lürssen, Vegesack	23 April 1939	15 July 1939	Badly damaged by mine 12 July 1940 in the North Sea, and scuttled.
S24	Lürssen, Vegesack	4 July 1939	18 September 1939	Transferred to USSR on 15 January 1946 as TK-1004, scrapped 1950 or later.
S25	Lürssen, Vegesack	19 September 1939	9 December 1939	Transferred to Britain post-war, scrapped 1948.

=== 1938 orders ===
In May 1938 it was planned to order six additional boats every year until 1943 (thus providing a projected S26 to S61). However, a speeding-up of production was decided on. Twelve additional boats were ordered - all from Lürssen - in August 1938. These were of two different models, due to accommodating different Daimler-Benz diesels.

==== S26 class ====
General characteristics (S26-class)
- Class & type: Fast attack craft
- Displacement: 112 tonnes (full load); 92.5 tonnes (standard)
- Length: 34.94 m (114 ft 8 in)
- Beam: 5.28 m (17 ft 4 in)
- Draught: 1.67 m (5 ft 6 in)
- Installed power: 6,000 brake horsepower (4,500 kW)
- Propulsion: 3 × Daimler Benz MB 501 marine diesel engines
- Speed: 39 knots (72 km/h; 45 mph)
- Range: 700 nmi (1,300 km; 810 mi) at 35 knots (65 km/h; 40 mph)
- Complement: 24 normal (maximum 30)
- Armament: 2 × 533 mm (21.0 in) torpedo tubes (4 torpedoes); 2 × 20 mm C/30 cannon (1x twin)

The larger type (S26 to S29), were ordered on 2 August, and entered service in 1940. Beginning with this model, the two torpedo tubes on the foredeck were encased within a high forecastle deck. This type were slightly lengthened from the S18 design so that the engine compartments could accommodate the larger 20-cylinder diesels, they measured 34.94 x 5.28 x 1.67 m (114 ft 8in x 17 ft 4in x 5 ft 6in), giving a displacement of 92.5 tons (112 tons full load). These dimensions would be retained for all subsequent boats (except for the somewhat smaller S30 class), as the basic design and layout would remain unchanged. The three Daimler Benz engines each produced 2,000 hp for a total rating of 6,000 hp, providing 39 knots.

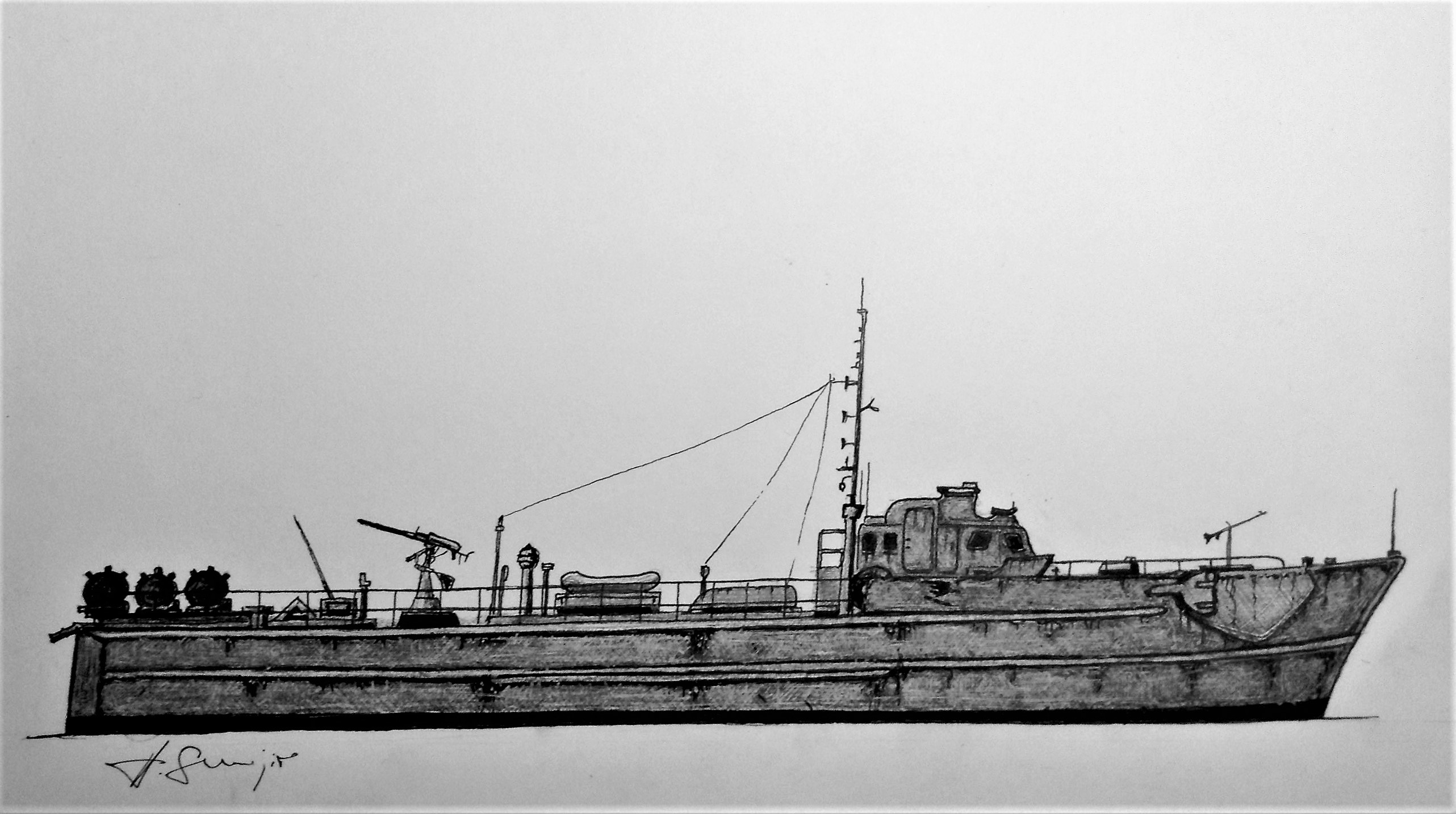
Schnellboot-26

Number	Builder	Launched	Commissioned	Fate
S26	Lürssen, Vegesack	7 March 1940	21 May 1940	Sunk in Soviet air attack at Sulina, Romania on 19 August 1944.
S27	Lürssen, Vegesack	15 April 1940	5 July 1940	Sunk by torpedo in the Black Sea on 5 September 1942
S28	Lürssen, Vegesack	4 July 1940	1 September 1940	Scuttled at Constanta on 25 August 1944 after heavy damage in air attack.
S29	Lürssen, Vegesack	14 October 1940	28 November 1940	Sunk 29 March 1943 in action with two British MGBs.

==== S30 class ====
General characteristics (S30-class)
- Class & type: Fast attack craft
- Displacement: 100 tonnes (full load); 92.5 tonnes (standard)
- Length: 32.76 m (107.5 ft)
- Beam: 5.06 m (16.6 ft)
- Draught: 1.47 m (4 ft 10 in)
- Installed power: 3,960 brake horsepower (2,950 kW)
- Propulsion: 3 × Daimler Benz MB 502 marine diesel engines
- Speed: 43.8 knots (81.1 km/h; 50.4 mph)
- Range: 800 nmi (1,500 km; 920 mi) at 30 knots (56 km/h; 35 mph)
- Complement: 24 normal (maximum 30)
- Armament: 2 × 533 mm (21.0 in) torpedo tubes (4 torpedoes); 3 × 20 mm C/30 cannon (1x twin, 1x single); 1 × 37 mm Flak 42 cannon

The other eight boats (S30 to S37) were 2.18 m (7 ft 2in) shorter than the S26 type and 22 cm (8.66 in) narrower. This is because their engines were the 16-cylinder (2,000 hp) Daimler-Benz MB502 diesels. They were originally ordered on 9 August (a week after S26 to S29) for the Chinese (Nationalist) Navy (the last two initially from Naglo, Berlin, but the contract was later switched to Lürssen), and were sequestered for use by the Kriegsmarine. As they were already under construction at the outbreak of war, they were mostly completed before the S26 type boats.

Number	Builder	Launched	Commissioned	Fate
S30	Lürssen, Vegesack	10 September 1939	22 November 1939	Delivered to Allied forces at Ancona on 3 May 1945.
S31	Lürssen, Vegesack	21 October 1939	28 December 1939	Sunk by mine off Malta on 10 May 1942
S32	Lürssen, Vegesack	22 November 1939	15 March 1940	Sunk by mine off Dungeness on 21 June 1940.
S33	Lürssen, Vegesack	23 November 1939	23 March 1940	Beached on Unije Island on 10 January 1945 and sunk by British MGB 698 on 16 January.
S34	Lürssen, Vegesack	29 February 1940	30 April 1940	Sunk by German Bf 109 following severe damage by coastal artillery at Valletta on 17 May 1942.
S35	Lürssen, Vegesack	19 March 1940	19 May 1940	Sunk by mine northeast of Tabarka (Algeria) in the Mediterranean on 28 February 1943.
S36	Lürssen, Vegesack	20 April 1940	14 June 1940	Damaged in collision with S61 and paid off; delivered to Allied forces at Ancona on 3 May 1945.
S37	Lürssen, Vegesack	15 May 1940	11 July 1940	Sunk by mine off Orfordness on 12 October 1940.

=== 1939 orders ===
24 more boats were ordered - all from Lürssen (S44 and S45 were first scheduled to be built by Stettiner Oderwerk, but in the event all of this batch were contracted to Lürssen - on 24 September 1939. The pre-war Mobilisation New Construction Programme had called for 48 new boats per year, but this target was raised to 60 boats in September 1939 by the Naval War Staff. They called for a fleet level of 40 to 50 operational boats, with 16 being built annually as replacements. Sixteen were virtually identical with the S26 type (measuring 34.94 m in length and with 20-cylinder MB501 diesels), other than simplified ventilators and other minor changes. This design was to provide almost all of the Schnellboote built in Germany for the rest of the war.

Number	Builder	Launched	Commissioned	Fate
S38	Lürssen, Vegesack	1940	8 November 1940	Sunk by British destroyers 20 November 1940 in North Sea.
S39	Lürssen, Vegesack	1940	16 January 1941	Sunk in British air attack on 2 August 1944 at Le Havre.
S40	Lürssen, Vegesack	14 December 1940	22 April 1941	Sunk in Soviet air attack at Sulina, Romania on 19 August 1944.
S41	Lürssen, Vegesack	9 January 1941	27 February 1941	Sunk in collision with S47 on 19 November 1941.
S42	Lürssen, Vegesack	1941	16 March 1941	Sunk in Soviet air attack at Constanta, Romania on 23 August 1944.
S43	Lürssen, Vegesack	15 February 1941	28 March 1941	Sunk by mine on 27 June 1941
S44	Lürssen, Vegesack	8 March 1941	19 April 1941	Sunk in British air attack at Kiel on 25 July 1943.
S45	Lürssen, Vegesack	23 March 1941	26 April 1941	Scuttled off Varna on 29 August 1944.
S46	Lürssen, Vegesack	7 April 1941	22 May 1941	Sunk in air attack on 10 September 1943
S47	Lürssen, Vegesack	25 April 1941	13 June 1941	Scuttled off Varna on 29 August 1944.
S48	Lürssen, Vegesack	28 April 1941	120 June 1941	To Norway (as E4) following end of war.
S49	Lürssen, Vegesack	May 1941	11 July 1941	Scuttled off Varna on 29 August 1944.
S50	Lürssen, Vegesack	18 June 1941	25 July 1941	To USSR on 15 January 1946, renamed TK-1005. Scrapped 1950.
S51	Lürssen, Vegesack	1 July 1941	8 August 1941	Scuttled off Varna on 29 August 1944.
S52	Lürssen, Vegesack	11 July 1941	23 August 1941	Sunk in Soviet air attack at Constanta, Romania on 23 August 1944.
S53	Lürssen, Vegesack	30 July 1941	6 September 1941	Sunk in collision with S39 on 20 February 1942.

While until this date all boats had been procured from Lürssen, but the German Navy had been seeking a second yard to add to its construction capacity, and on 25 September a contract for eight boats (numbered from S101 to S108) to the standard S26 design was awarded to Schlichting-Werfk at Travemünde. This second builder was assigned a new series of numbers in the "101 range to distinguish them from the Lürssen boats.

Number	Builder	Launched	Commissioned	Fate
S101	Schlichting, Travemünde	25 September 1940	30 November 1940	To USSR on 4 January 1946 as TK-1011, scrapped 1950.
S102	Schlichting, Travemünde	6 November 1940	31 December 1940	Sunk by mine 8 July 1943 in the Kerch Strait.
S103	Schlichting, Travemünde	21 December 1940	9 February 1941	Sunk by British air attack 4 May 1945 off Mommark.
S104	Schlichting, Travemünde	18 February 1941	27 March 1941	Sunk by mine 9 January 1943 in the Channel.
S105	Schlichting, Travemünde	22 March 1941	4 May 1941	To Britain 1945, sold 1947.
S106	Schlichting, Travemünde	26 April 1941	6 June 1941	Sunk by mine 27 June 1941 in Gulf of Bothnia.
S107	Schlichting, Travemünde	31 May 1941	6 July 1941	To USA 1945, then to Denmark 1947 as T52 (later Gribben); scrapped 1950.
S108	Schlichting, Travemünde	28 June 1941	14 August 1941	Scrapped 1946.

Following the outbreak of war, another eight boats were ordered from Lürssen on 14 November 1939 to the same Schnellboot 1939 design as the S30 group (measuring 32.76 m in length and with 16-cylinder MB502 diesels),

Number	Builder	Launched	Commissioned	Fate
S54	Lürssen, Vegesack	11 June 1940	9 August 1940	Badly damaged by mine on 23 April 1944, scrapped 31 October 1944.
S55	Lürssen, Vegesack	2 July 1940	23 August 1940	Sunk in air attack on 10 January 1944 in Vela Luka Bay, Croatia.
S56	Lürssen, Vegesack	22 July 1940	20 September 1940	Sunk in air attack at Toulon on 24 November 1943; raised and broken up.
S57	Lürssen, Vegesack	10 August 1940	30 September 1940	Sunk by British MTBs in the Adriatic on 19 August 1944.
S58	Lürssen, Vegesack	10 September 1940	18 November 1940	Beached on Unije Island and sunk by British MGBs on 16 January 1945.
S59	Lürssen, Vegesack	20 October 1940	27 November 1940	Sunk by air attack at Porto Empedocle (Sicily) on 6 July 1943.
S60	Lürssen, Vegesack	22 October 1940	20 December 1940	Beached on Unije Island and sunk by British MGBs on 16 January 1945.
S61	Lürssen, Vegesack	27 November 1940	1 February 1941	Surrendered to Allies at Ancona 3 May 1945

=== 1940 orders ===
On 4 June 1940 a further batch of boats to the S26 design was ordered. This comprised 8 boats from Lürssen (S62 to S69) and 9 boats from Schlichting (S109 to S117). S67 introduced an improved design with a partially armour-plated cupola (the Kalotte or skull cap) over the bridge, providing protection from weather as well as small arms fire, with a lower profile. From 1943 orders onwards, this armoured bridge became standard, and was also retro-fitted to many of the earlier boats. Various armaments were carried including 40 mm Bofors or 20 mm Flak aft, MG34 Zwillingsockel midships.
(Note the designation '38b' sometimes seen is not Kriegsmarine nomenclature and originated in a postwar American hobby publication).

Number	Builder	Launched	Commissioned	Fate
S62	Lürssen, Vegesack	August 1941	19 September 1941	To Norway 1945, then to Britain; scrapped 1947.
S63	Lürssen, Vegesack	27 August 1941	2 October 1941	Rammed and sunk 25 October 1943 off Cromer.
S64	Lürssen, Vegesack	September 1941	2 November 1941	To USA 1945, given to Norway 1947 as Lyn, then to Denmark 1951 as Storfuglen, scrapped 1965.
S65	Lürssen, Vegesack	20 September 1941	16 June 1942	To USSR on 15 January 1946 as TK-1006, scrapped 1950.
S66	Lürssen, Vegesack	6 October 1941	21 June 1942	Sunk by air attack by British at Kiel on 25 July 1943.
S67	Lürssen, Vegesack	23 October 1941	19 March 1942	To Britain 1945, sold to Italy 1952 as MV 621, scrapped 1966.
S68	Lürssen, Vegesack	6 November 1941	1 July 1942	To USA 1945, given to Denmark 1947 as T62, renamed Viben 1953, scrapped 1966.
S69	Lürssen, Vegesack	24 November 1941	21 December 1941	To Britain 1945, scrapped 1947.

Number	Builder	Launched	Commissioned	Fate
S109	Schlichting, Travemünde	14 August 1941	14 September 1941	To USSR 9n 4 January 1946 as TK-1012, scrapped 1949.
S110	Schlichting, Travemünde	13 September 1941	10 October 1941	To USSR on 15 January 1946 as TK-1013, scrapped 1949.
S111	Schlichting, Travemünde	18 October 1941	11 December 1941	Damaged in action 16 March 1942 in the North Sea, captured then recaptured and scuttled.
S112	Schlichting, Travemünde	2 December 1941	28 January 1942	To France in 1945, scrapped 1951.
S113	Schlichting, Travemünde	7 February 1942	14 March 1942	To USSR on 5 November 1945 as TK-1014, scrapped 1949.
S114	Schlichting, Travemünde	14 March 1942	23 April 1942	Sunk in British air attack on 2 August 1944 at Le Havre.
S115	Schlichting, Travemünde	10 April 1942	30 May 1942	To UK in 1945, fate unknown.
S116	Schlichting, Travemünde	7 May 1842	4 July 1942	Paid off after accident in Elbe estuary in January 1945; to Denmark in 1945; sold to Germany 1953, burnt by accident 1965.
S117	Schlichting, Travemünde	13 June 1942	8 August 1942	To USA in 1945, then to Norway 1946 as B97, later Tross; sold 1951 to Denmark as Hejren, scrapped 1965.

Following the German occupation of France in June 1940, the Naval War Staff decided that 160 E-boats were now needed (comprising 26 flotillas), with 8 flotillas based in France and 6 each in Norway, the Baltic and the North Sea. On 26 August an additional four boats (S70 to S73) were ordered from Lürssen, and in December Schlichting were given another order, this time for eight boats (S118 to S125),

Number	Builder	Launched	Commissioned	Fate
S70	Lürssen, Vegesack	15 November 1941	11 December 1941	Sunk by mine in the Channel 5 March 1943.
S71	Lürssen, Vegesack	4 December 1941	11 January 1942	Sunk by British destroyers 18 February 1943 in the Channel.
S72	Lürssen, Vegesack	18 December 1941	3 February 1942	Sunk in Soviet air attack at Sulina, Romania on 19 August 1944.
S73	Lürssen, Vegesack	6 January 1942	19 February 1942	Sold to Spain on 16 August 1943 as LT23.

Number	Builder	Launched	Commissioned	Fate
S118	Schlichting Travemünde	30 July 1942	14 September 1942	To USSR on 14 January 1946 as TK-1015, scrapped 1949.
S119	Schlichting Travemünde	27 August 1942	22 October 1942	Scuttled after collision with S114 on 8 March 1943 in the Channel.
S120	Schlichting Travemünde	13 October 1942	5 December 1942	To Britain 1945, scrapped 1947.
S121	Schlichting Travemünde	28 November 1942	11 January 1943	Sunk in British air attack on 11 August 1943 at Aberwrac'h.
S122	Schlichting Travemünde	30 December 1942	21 February 1943	To USA in 1945; to Denmark 1947 as T64; scrapped 1956.
S123	Schlichting Travemünde	6 February 1943	19 March 1943	To USSR on 4 January 1946 as TK-1016, scrapped 1949.
S124	Schlichting Travemünde	6 March 1943	15 April 1943	Sold to Spain on 16 August 1943 as LT21.
S125	Schlichting Travemünde	3 April 1943	16 May 1943	Sold to Spain on 16 August 1943 as LT25.

=== 1941 orders ===
Another 40 boats were ordered in 1941, 16 from Lürssen on 3 January (numbered S74 to S89), another 16 from the same yard on 18 September (numbered S90 to S100 and from S134 to S138) and 8 from Schlichting at Travemünde (S126 to S133), also on 18 September.

S74	Lürssen, Vegesack	12 February 1942	27 March 1942	Sunk by torpedo from S135 on 5 November 1943 after being disabled in British air attack.
S75	Lürssen, Vegesack	?February 1942	9 April 1942	Sunk by British air attack on 5 March 1943 at Ijmuiden.
S76	Lürssen, Vegesack	March 1942	1 May 1942	To USA 1945, given to Norway 1947, scrapped 1950.
S77	Lürssen, Vegesack	31 March 1942	9 May 1942	Sunk by gunfire 25 July 1943 in action off Ostend with British MGB40 and MGB42.
S78	Lürssen, Vegesack	8 April 1942	3 June 1942	Sold to Spain on 16 August 1943 as LT24.
S79	Lürssen, Vegesack	22 April 1942	27 June 1942	To Norway 1945, given to Denmark 1947 as T58, renamed Musvaagen, scrapped 1955.
S80	Lürssen, Vegesack	1942	10 July 1942	Sunk by mine off Viborg in the Baltic Sea on 1 September 1944.
S81	Lürssen, Vegesack	1942	28 July 1942	To USSR on 4 January 1946 as TK-1001, scrapped 1950.
S82	Lürssen, Vegesack	1942	21 August 1942	To USSR 15 January 1946 as TK-1008, scrapped 1950.
S83	Lürssen, Vegesack	1942	7 September 1942	To Britain 1945, fate unknown.
S84	Lürssen, Vegesack	1942	19 September 1942	Sunk by British air attack on Le Havre on 14 June 1944.
S85	Lürssen, Vegesack	1942	7 December 1942	To USA 1945, given to Norway as Storm; sold to Denmark 1951 as Tranen, sunk in collision 27 June 1963.
S86	Lürssen, Vegesack	1942	15 October 1942	To USSR on 4 January 1946 as TK-1009, scrapped 1950.
S87	Lürssen, Vegesack	1942	4 November 1942	Sunk in British air attack 20 May 1944 off Ostend.
S88	Lürssen, Vegesack	6 October 1942	20 November 1942	Sunk by gunfire from HMS Worcester and British MTBs on 25 October 1943 off Cromer.
S89	Lürssen, Vegesack	1942	28 November 1942	To Britain 1946, beached during transfer.
S90	Lürssen, Vegesack	1942	10 December 1942	Beached on island of Bru, Rogaland on 17 July 1945.
S91	Lürssen, Vegesack	1942	22 December 1942	Sunk 25 February 1944 by gunfire from HMS Retalick and Talybont in the Channel.
S92	Lürssen, Vegesack	1942	14 January 1943	To Britain 1945, sold 1947.
S93	Lürssen, Vegesack	17 December 1942	4 February 1943	Sunk in US air attack at Ijmuidden on 26 March 1944.
S94	Lürssen, Vegesack	31 December 1942	18 February 1943	Scuttled after collision with S128 on 23 February 1944.
S95	Lürssen, Vegesack	1942	28 February 1943	To Britain 1945, sold 1949.
S96	Lürssen, Vegesack	21 January 1943	11 March 1943	Scuttled after collision with British ML145 on 25 September 1943 off Lowestoft.
S97	Lürssen, Vegesack	1943	25 March 1943	To USA 1945, given to Denmark 1947 as Ravnen, scrapped 1963.
S98	Lürssen, Vegesack	1943	10 April 1943	To USA 1945, given to Norway 1948 as Kvikk, scrapped 1950.
S99	Lürssen, Vegesack	1943	17 April 1943	To USSR on 4 January 1946 as TK-1010, scrapped 1950.
S100	Lürssen, Vegesack	1943	5 May 1943	Sunk by British air attack on Le Havre on 14 June 1944.
S134	Lürssen, Vegesack	1943	29 May 1943	Sold to Spain on 16 August 1943 as LT26.
S135	Lürssen, Vegesack	1943	29 May 1943	To USSR on 4 January 1946, becoming TK-1018; scrapped 1952.
S136	Lürssen, Vegesack	1943	10 June 1943	Sunk in action with HMCS Sioux, HMS Duff and Polish Krakowiak east of Cape Barfleur on 11 June 1944.
S137	Lürssen, Vegesack	1943	6 July 1943	Sunk by USAAF raid (by 8th Air Force B-17s) on Kiel on 29 July 1943.
S138	Lürssen, Vegesack	1943	20 July 1943	Sunk during RAF raid on Le Havre on 15 June 1944; raised in August 1944 and scrapped.

Number	Builder	Launched	Commissioned	Fate
S126	Schlichting Travemünde	8 May 1843	12 June 1943	Sold to Spain on 16 August 1943 as LT26.
S127	Schlichting Travemünde	5 June 1943	10 July 1943	To USA in 1945, then to Denmark 1947 as T56; scrapped 1955.
S128	Schlichting Travemünde	8 July 1943	27 August 1943	Scuttled after collision with S94 on 23 February 1944
S129	Schlichting Travemünde	12 August 1943	24 September 1943	Sunk in US air attack at Ijmuidden on 26 March 1944.
S130	Schlichting Travemünde	18 September 1943	21 October 1943	To UK 1945, sold to Germany 1957 as UW10. Still extant in UK.
S131	Schlichting Travemünde	16 October 1943	5 January 1944	Sunk in Soviet air attack at Constanta, Romania on 23 August 1944.
S132	Schlichting Travemünde	13 November 1943	10 December 1943	To USSR 1945, becoming TK-1017; scrapped 1956.
S133	Schlichting Travemünde	1943	31 December 1943	To USA at war's end, given to Denmark 1947 as T54, scrapped 1955.

=== 1942 orders ===
Orders for a further 16 boats were given to Lürssen on 24 February 1942. The first 12 of these were numbered S139 to S150; the next sixteen numbers were allocated to construction at Schiedam in Holland, so the final four of the Lürssen batch were numbered S167 to S170.

Number	Builder	Launched	Commissioned	Fate
S139	Lürssen, Vegesack	1943	1 August 1943	Sunk by mine on 7 June 1944 off Barfleur.
S140	Lürssen, Vegesack	1943	7 August 1943	Sunk by mine on 7 June 1944 off Barfleur.
S141	Lürssen, Vegesack	1943	20 August 1943	Sunk by French destroyer La Combattante off Selsey Bill on 13 May 1944.
S142	Lürssen, Vegesack	1943	3 September 1943	Sunk by British air attack on Le Havre on 14 June 1944.
S143	Lürssen, Vegesack	1943	17 September 1943	Sunk by British air attack on Le Havre on 14 June 1944.
S144	Lürssen, Vegesack	1943	1 October 1943	Badly damaged by British air attack on Le Havre on 14 June 1944, and scrapped
S145	Lürssen, Vegesack	1943	8 October 1943	Damaged by air attack on Brest on 18 September 1944 and blown up.
S146	Lürssen, Vegesack	1943	22 October 1943	Sunk by British air attack on Le Havre on 14 June 1944.
S147	Lürssen, Vegesack	1943	5 November 1943	Sunk by French destroyer La Combattante off Cherbourg on 25 April 1944.
S148	Lürssen, Vegesack	1943	5 January 1944	Sunk by mine off Dniester Liman on 22 August 1944.
S149	Lürssen, Vegesack	1943	5 January 1944	Scuttled at Constanta on 25 August 1944 after heavy damage in air attack.
S150	Lürssen, Vegesack	1943	4 December 1943	Sunk by British air attack on Le Havre on 14 June 1944.

=== S151 class ===
Eight smaller torpedo boats were building for the Dutch Navy at Gusto Werf, Schiedam (near Rotterdam) as TM54 to TM61 inclusive. When Holland was occupied by the Germans, these were seized and completed (with some design modifications) by German and Dutch shipyard workers and renumbered as S151 to S158. They measured 28.3 x 4.46 metres (92 ft 10in x 14 ft 7in), displacing 57 tons. Originally the Germans planned to sell these to Bulgaria, and they were formed as the new 7th S-flotilla in October 1941, but the Kriegsmarine's need for them in the Mediterranean had caused them to be sent south via the French inland waterways. They were authorised to transfer to the Mediterranean on 15 July 1942, and arrived there on 8 October, finally reaching Augusta, Sicily on 15 December, when they became operational.

Number	Builder	Commissioned	Fate
S151	Gusto Werf, Schiedam	19 December 1941	Badly damaged off Korkula by British destroyer on 11 July 1944; surrendered to Allies at Ancona 3 May 1945.
S152	Gusto Werf, Schiedam	31 March 1942	Surrendered to Allies at Ancona 3 May 1945.
S153	Gusto Werf, Schiedam	19 April 1942	Sunk by HMS Eggesford and Blackmore off Hvar 12 June 1944.
S154	Gusto Werf, Schiedam	10 June 1942	Sunk by bombing at Pola 22 January 1945
S155	Gusto Werf, Schiedam	19 July 1942	Surrendered to Allies at Ancona 3 May 1945
S156	Gusto Werf, Schiedam	5 September 1942	Surrendered to Allies at Ancona 3 May 1945
S157	Gusto Werf, Schiedam	8 September 1942	Sunk by Yogoslav mortar fire west of Trieste 1 May 1945
S158	Gusto Werf, Schiedam	9 September 1942	Disabled by British air attack at Sibenik 25 October 1944, then scuttled on 26 or 27 October.

Eight further vessels had been intended by the Dutch Navy as TM62 to TM70, and material had been collected for their construction at Schiedam. They were cancelled with the German occupation in May 1940; they were re-ordered (as S159 to S166) from Gusto Werf on 11 July 1941, but construction of these stopped in April 1942.

Continuation of S139 batch

All these were part of the order placed on 24 February 1942, and the first three were identical to S139 batch. However the final boat, S170, was the prototype (along with S228 at Travemünde) for the final series of boats ordered in December 1943 (few of which were completed) with the first MB518 engines of 3,000 hp for evaluation; her details were the same as for that final series of orders.

Number	Builder	Launched	Commissioned	Fate
S167	Lürssen, Vegesack	1943	17 December 1943	Sank in the Scheldt Estuary on 25 February 1945 after collision 22 February.
S168	Lürssen, Vegesack	1943	23 December 1943	To UK 1945, scrapped 1947.
S169	Lürssen, Vegesack	1943	3 January 1944	Sunk by British air attack on Le Havre on 14 June 1944.
S170	Lürssen, Vegesack	1943	11 February 1944	Blown up in Lübeck on 3 May 1945.

=== 1943 orders ===
Needing to increase production, orders for two batches of vessels were placed during the first half of 1943, totalling sixty boats. An order for sixteen boats was placed with Lürssen's yard on 15 January 1943 (S171 to S186), and another order for eight boats with Schlichting at Travemünde on the same day (S187 to S194). On 7 May another batch was ordered from the same builders - twenty-four from Lürssen (S195 to S218) and twelve from Schlichting (S219 to S230), although the final two from the Schlichting order were seemingly deferred, to be re-included in the much larger order placed in December.

Like the S139 batch, almost all of these were a metre longer than the original S26 class in order to have room to fit the new supercharged MB511 engines. The sole exception was S228 - the final boat from this batch to be completed at Travemünde, which was that yard's prototype for the final mass series which were ordered in December 1943, built to carry the new MB518 diesels, and was thus the equivalent test-bed at that yard to S170 from Lürssen. All the other 57 boats completed from this batch had MB 511 diesels fitted.

Number	Builder	Launched	Commissioned	Fate
S171	Lürssen, Vegesack	1943	22 January 1944	Sunk by British air attack on Le Havre on 14 June 1944.
S172	Lürssen, Vegesack	1943	18 February 1944	Sunk by British air attack on Le Havre on 14 June 1944.
S173	Lürssen, Vegesack	1943	25 February 1944	Sunk by British air attack on Le Havre on 14 June 1944.
S174	Lürssen, Vegesack	1943	3 March 1944	To USA in 1945; given to Norway 1947 as Rapp, scrapped 1953.
S175	Lürssen, Vegesack	1944	11 March 1944	To USSR 1945, becoming TK-1019; scrapped 1952.
S176	Lürssen, Vegesack	1944	17 March 1944	Scuttled after ramming British MTB494 on 7 April 1945.
S177	Lürssen, Vegesack	1944	30 March 1944	Scuttled after ramming British MTB493 on 7 April 1945.
S178	Lürssen, Vegesack	1944	6 April 1944	Sunk by British air attack off Boulogne on 13 June 1944.
S179	Lürssen, Vegesack	1944	19 April 1944	Sunk by British air attack off Boulogne on 13 June 1944.
S180	Lürssen, Vegesack	1944	28 April 1944	Sunk by mine off Hook of Holland on 14 January 1945.
S181	Lürssen, Vegesack	1944	5 May 1944	Sunk by British air attack off Den Helder on 21 March 1945
S182	Lürssen, Vegesack	1944	12 May 1944	Sunk in collision with British MTB430 in the Channel on 27 July 1944.
S183	Lürssen, Vegesack	1944	19 May 1944	Sunk by gunfire from HMS Stayner off Dunkirk on 19 September 1944.
S184	Lürssen, Vegesack	1944	28 May 1944	Damaged by gunfire from British coastal battery off Dover on 5 September 1944 and scuttled.
S185	Lürssen, Vegesack	1944	3 June 1944	Sunk by gunfire from British escorts off Ostend on 23 December 1944.
S186	Lürssen, Vegesack	1944	23 June 1944	Sunk at Wilhelmhaven by British bombing 30 March 1945.
S187	Schlichting Travemünde	31 December 1943	10 February 1944	Sunk by British air attack on Le Havre on 14 June 1944.
S188	Schlichting Travemünde	6 February 1944	1 March 1944	Sunk by British air attack on Le Havre on 14 June 1944.
S189	Schlichting Travemünde	6 March 1944	31 March 1944	Sunk by British air attack off Boulogne on 13 June 1944.
S190	Schlichting Travemünde	30 March 1944	22 April 1944	Sunk by gunfire from British ships in Seine Estuary on 23 June 1944.
S191	Schlichting Travemünde	22 April 1944	18 May 1944	Scuttled 4 May 1945 in Fehmannsound after collision with S301.
S192	Schlichting Travemünde	13 May 1944	7 June 1944	Sunk by gunfire from British escorts off Ostend on 23 December 1944.
S193	Schlichting Travemünde	6 June 1944	28 June 1944	Sunk by gunfire from British escorts in North Sea on 22 February 1945.
S194	Schlichting Travemünde	23 June 1944	19 July 1944	Sunk at Wilhelmhaven by British bombing 30 March 1945.
S195	Lürssen, Vegesack	1944	28 June 1944	To USA at war's end, given to Norwegian Navy 1945 as Kjekk, scrapped 1956.
S196	Lürssen, Vegesack	1944	3 July 1944	To UK a war's end, given to Denmark 1947 as Raalgen (T59), scrapped 1958 after 1951 collision.
S197	Lürssen, Vegesack	1944	10 July 1944	To USA at war's end, given to Denmark 1947 as Lommen, scrapped 1972.
S198	Lürssen, Vegesack	1944	15 July 1944	Sunk in British air attack at Ijmuiden on 15 December 1944.
S199	Lürssen, Vegesack	1944	21 July 1944	Scuttled after collision with S701 on 23 January 1945.
S200	Lürssen, Vegesack	1944	3 August 1944	Sunk by gunfire from British escorts off Dunkirk on 19 September 1944.
S201	Lürssen, Vegesack	1944	28 July 1944	Scuttled at Kiel on 3 May 1945 after air attack damage.
S202	Lürssen, Vegesack	1944	8 August 1944	Sunk in collision with S703 on 8 April 1945 in the Scheldt approaches in action with British MGBs.
S203	Lürssen, Vegesack	1944	13 August 1944	Scuttled off Lindesne after collision with R220 on 10 November 1944.
S204	Lürssen, Vegesack	1944	19 August 1944	To USSR 1945, becoming TK-1020; scrapped 1954.
S205	Lürssen, Vegesack	1944	28 August 1944	To UK in 1945, scrapped 1946.
S206	Lürssen, Vegesack	1944	31 August 1944	To USA at war's end, given to Denmark 1947 as Hoegen (T55), scrapped 1957 after collision.
S207	Lürssen, Vegesack	1944	19 September 1944	To UK at war's end, given to Denmark 1947 as Skaden (T61), scrapped 1960.
S208	Lürssen, Vegesack	1944	28 September 1944	To USA at war's end, given to Germany 1957, scrapped 1967.
S209	Lürssen, Vegesack	1944	21 October 1944	To USSR in 1945, renamed TK-1021; scrapped 1954.
S210	Lürssen, Vegesack	1944	27 September 1944	To USA at war's end, given to Norwegian Navy 1947 as Snar, scrapped 1950.
S211	Lürssen, Vegesack	1944	1 October 1944	To USSR on 15 January 1946, renamed TK-1022; scrapped 1954.
S212	Lürssen, Vegesack	1944	11 October 1944	To UK in 1945, scrapped 1957.
S213	Lürssen, Vegesack	1944	7 January 1945	To UK in 1945, scrapped 1945.
S214	Lürssen, Vegesack	1944	8 December 1944	To USSR on 4 January 1946, renamed TK-1023; scrapped 1954.
S215	Lürssen, Vegesack	1944	1 December 1944	To UK in 1945, scrapped 1948.
S216	Lürssen, Vegesack	1944	27 December 1944	To USA at war's end, given to Denmark 1947 as Havoarnen (T53), scrapped 1957.
S217	Lürssen, Vegesack	1944	30 January 1945	To UK in 1945, scrapped 1948.
S218	Lürssen, Vegesack	1944	18 January 1945	To USA in 1945, fate unknown.
S219	Schlichting Travemünde	11 July 1944	9 August 1944	To USSR on 15 January 1946, renamed TK-1024; scrapped 1957.
S220	Schlichting Travemünde	9 August 1944	27 August 1944	Badly damaged in action 1 March 1945 and scuttled.
S221	Schlichting Travemünde	16 August 1944	10 September 1944	To UK 1945. Scrapped 1948.
S222	Schlichting Travemünde	31 August 1944	23 September 1944	To USSR on 4 January 1946, renamed TK-1025. Scrapped 1953.
S223	Schlichting Travemünde	14 September 1944	29 October 1944	Sunk by mine off Ostend on 8 April 1945.
S224	Schlichting Travemünde	1944	17 November 1944	Sunk at Wilhelmhaven by British bombing 30 March 1945.
S225	Schlichting Travemünde	1944	1 December 1944	To USA 1945, fate unknown
S226	Schlichting Travemünde	1944	27 February 1945	Sunk in air attack 6 May 1945
S227	Schlichting Travemünde	1944	1944 or 1945	To USSR 1945, renamed TK-1026. Scrapped 1949.
S228	Schlichting Travemünde	1944	19 April 1945	To UK 1945. Scrapped 1946.

The final batch ordered on 4 December 1943 comprised a massive total of 282 units - S229 to S260 (32 boats) from Schlichting; S301 to S425 (125 boats) from Lürssen; and S701 to S825 (125 boats) from Danziger Waggon at Danzig. The first four of the Schlichting boats (S229 to S230) were completed by April 1945 but not placed into service; these were presumably broken up in the shipyard following the cessation of hostilities. Of the projected numbers from the other two builders only the first five from Lürssen and 9 from Danzig were completed. Another seven were launched but not completed; these were scuttled in the North Sea, while fourteen more were scrapped in the Lürssen shipyard (S308 to S328) and others at Travemünde and Danzig. The remainder were all cancelled.

Number	Builder	Launched	Commissioned	Fate
S301	Lürssen, Vegesack	1944	31 January 1945	Scuttled 7 May 1945 in Fehmannsound after collision with S191.
S302	Lürssen, Vegesack	1944	12 February 1945	To USA at end of war, then became Norwegian E1 in July 1947, renamed Blink in 1948; sold to Denmark 1951 as Falken, scrapped 1972.
S303	Lürssen, Vegesack	1944	24 February 1945	To USA at end of war, then became Norwegian E2 in July 1946, renamed Brand in 1948; sold to Denmark 1950 as Taarnfalken, scrapped 1972.
S304	Lürssen, Vegesack	1944	9 March 1945	To UK in 1945; scrapped 1946.
S305	Lürssen, Vegesack	1944	29 March 1945	To USA in 1945, then became to Denmark on 31 July 1947 as T57, later named Jagtfalken, scrapped 1962.
S306	Lürssen, Vegesack	1944	April 1945 (incomplete)	To USA in 1945, then to Denmark on 31 July 1947 as Glenten, scrapped 1960.
S307	Lürssen, Vegesack	1944	April 1945 (incomplete)	To UK in 1945, then scrapped.

=== S501 class ===
These small ex-Italian Navy boats of the Baglietto fast type (or MAS526 type) were taken over by the Germans in the Black Sea on 20 May 1943. The first seven of these measured 18.7 x 4.7 x 1.5 m (61 ft 4in x 15 ft 5in x 4 ft 11in) and displaced 25.2 tons (29.4 tons full load). These 2-shaft boats were driven by 2 Isotta-Fraschini petrol engines of 2,000 hp to reach 42 knots. They carried two 450mm torpedoes plus one MG or 20mm gun, and 6 depth charges, with a crew of 10. All 7 were transferred to the Romania in August 1943, but seized by the USSR on 5 September 1943.

Number	Ex-Italian	Builder	Launched	Fate
S501	ex MAS 566	Baglietto, Varazze	20 June 1941	Sunk in Black Sea 1944
S502	ex MAS 567	Basglietto, Varazze	20 July 1941	Sunk in Black Sea 1944
S503	ex MAS 568	Basglietto, Varazze	11 August 1941	Sunk in Black Sea 1944
S504	ex MAS 569	Basglietto, Varazze	8 September 1941	Sunk in Black Sea 1944
S505	ex MAS 570	Basglietto, Varazze	20 September 1941	Sunk in Black Sea 1944
S506	ex MAS 574	Celli, Venice	1941	Sunk at Constanta on 25 August 1944
S507	ex MAS 575	Celli, Venice	1941	Sunk in Black Sea 1944
S508	ex MAS 525	CRDA, Monfalcone		
S509	ex MAS 549	CRDA, Monfalcone	1939	Sunk (as SA 12) at Imperia on 24 April 1945
S510	ex MAS 551	CRDA, Monfalcone	1941	Sunk (as SA 13) at Imperia on 24 April 1945
S511	ex MAS 557	Picchiotti, Limite sull'Arno	7 March 1941	Sunk by British air attack on 4 December 1944
S512	ex MAS 553	CRDA, Monfalcone	10 May 1941	Sunk (as SA 14) at Imperia on 24 April 1945

=== S601 class ===
Further small ex-Italian Navy boats of the Baglietto fast type (of various classes) were taken over by the Germans.

Number	Ex-Italian	Built	Launched	Fate
S601	ex MAS 542	Venice	5 July 1939	Sunk in Aegean by air attack 1944.
S602	ex MAS 430	Venice	1929	Scuttled 1944 at Sebenico.
S603	ex MAS 431	Varazze	1931	Sunk November 1943 at Zara-Sebenico.
S604	ex MAS 423	Venice	March 1929	Sunk in 1944 in the Adriatic.
S621	ex MAS 561	Varazze	4 February 1941	Sunk (as SA 16) near Imperia on 24 April 1945
S622	ex MAS 550	Monfalcone	23 September 1939	Sunk (as SA 21) in air attack at Monfalcone on 14 March 1944.
S623	ex MAS 554	Monfalcone	20 May 1941	Scuttled (as SA 20) at Trieste on 1 May 1945; refloated and scrapped
S624	ex MAS 424	Varasse	24 October 1937	Sunk (as SA 17) in air attack at Monfalcone on 14 March 1944.
S625	ex MAS 437	Venice	1934	Sunk (as SA 18) in May 1945
S626	ex MAS 502	Varazze	24 April 1936	Sunk by German artillery off La Spezia March 1944
S627	ex MAS 504	Varazze	24 August 1936	Sunk off Anzio by HMS Grenville on 25 March 1944.
S628	ex MAS 505	Varazze	19 February 1937	Sunk (as SA 19) at Genoa in May 1945
S629	ex MAS 558	Venice	1940	Scuttled (as SA 15) near Imperia on 24 April 1945.
S630				

=== S700 class ===
Late war design proposal with stern torpedo tubes and 30 mm gun turret forward. These were intended to be slightly larger, of prefabricated construction, and to be propelled by the supercharged MB518 engines. They were to have carried two stern-firing torpedo tubes in addition to the usual two bow tubes, with a special 30mm gun in a bow turret. These were ordered from Danziger Waggonfabrik at Danzig on 4 December 1943 as S701 to S825 (125 boats), but only the first nine boats were built, and these were completed to S100 design specification with MB511 diesel engines after the production of the MB518 engine was cancelled due to Allied bombing. The other boats were cancelled or scrapped unfinished in the shipyard.

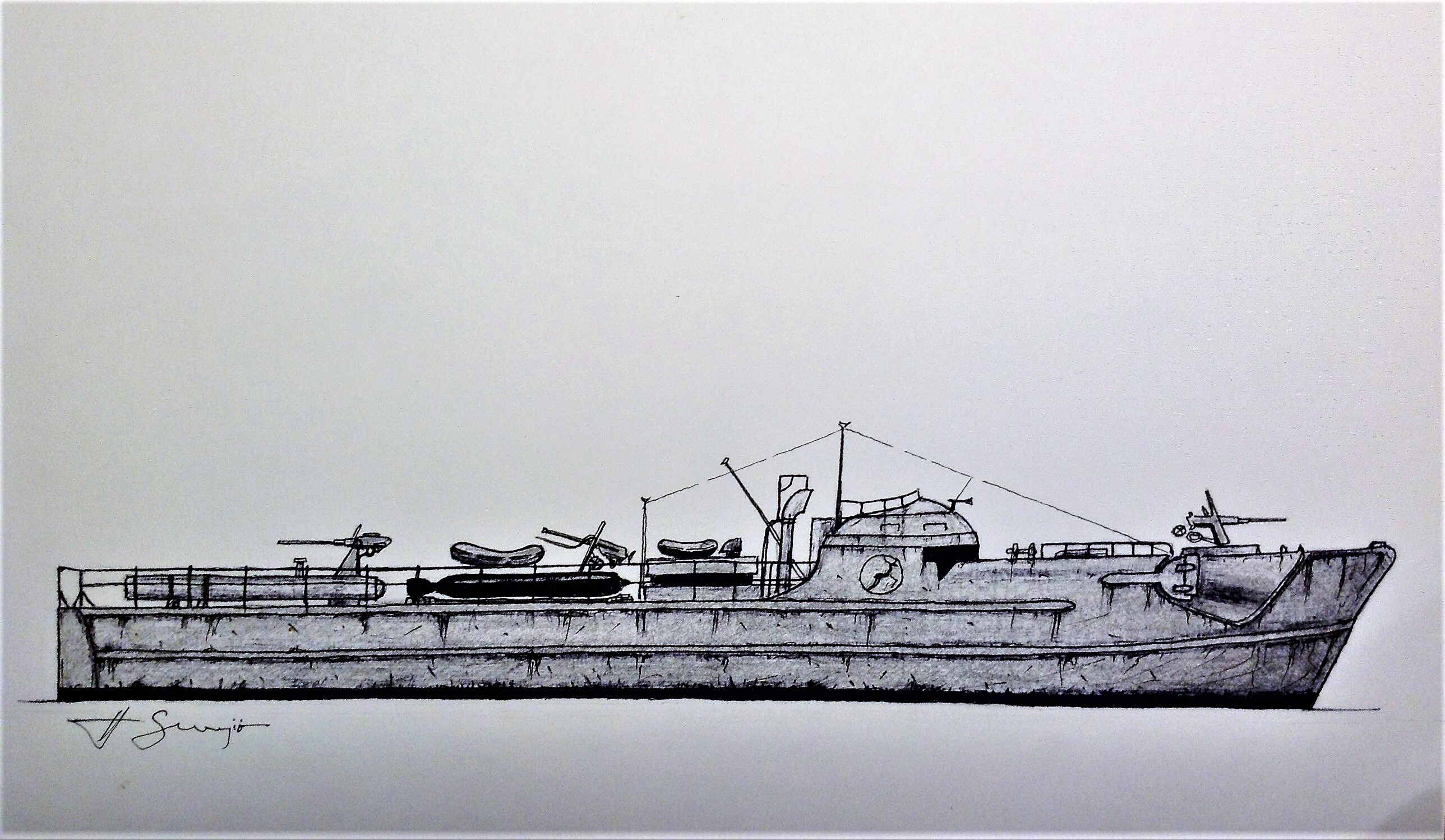
Schnellboot S701 in April 1945. This torpedo boat was part of the 8th flotilla based in Ijmuiden. The S701 had been delivered to the Kriegsmarine in July, 1944. It was surrendered to the U.S. Navy in 1945 and then sold to the Dutch Navy.

Number	Builder	Launched	Commissioned	Fate
S701	Danziger Waggonfabrik	1944	3 July 1944	Badly damaged on 23 January 1945 in collision with S199; to USA 1945, then sold to Netherlands Navy 1951
S702	Danziger Waggonfabrik	1944	30 July 1944	Sunk in action with British MTBs on 19 September 1944 after collision with S200.
S703	Danziger Waggonfabrik	1944	30 August 1944	Sunk after collision with S202 on 8 April 1945 in the Scheldt approaches in action with British MGBs.
S704	Danziger Waggonfabrik	1944	2 October 1944	To USSR on 15 January 1946 as TK-1027, scrapped 1949
S705	Danziger Waggonfabrik	1944	22 October 1944	To UK on 4 January 1946, scrapped 1947.
S706	Danziger Waggonfabrik	1944	31 October 1944	To USA on 30 January 1947, fate unknown.
S707	Danziger Waggonfabrik	1944	4 December 1944	To USSR on 15 January 1946 as TK-1028, scrapped 1949.
S708	Danziger Waggonfabrik	1944	19 February 1945	To USSR on 15 January 1946 as TK-1029, scrapped 1954.
S709	Danziger Waggonfabrik	1944	1945	To USSR on 29 March 1946 as TK-1030, scrapped 1949.

In the 1944 Programme it was intended to increase production of E-boats to deliver 150 boats per annum, but this level was never achieved. In November 1944 there were 292 boats on order, of which 138 were under construction, usually awaiting delivery of the new MB518 engines, while the other 154 boats were unstarted. Eventually, as the ability to provide engines increased, only 19 of the 138 boats were actually completed.

=== KS-boats (Kleinst Schnellboote), originally KM-series (Küstenminenleger) ===
A class of small fast attack craft designed as offensive mine-layers (rated Küstenminenleger), able to carry up to 4 mines, and to operate close to enemy shores. They measured 15.95 x 3.50 x 1.10 m (52 ft 4in x 11 ft 6in x 3 ft 7in); 15/16 tonnes standard (18/19 tonnes full load). Powered by 2 BMW MB507 12-cylinder aero engines producing 1,650 hp (32 knots), although four boats (nos. 1, 2, 5 and 6) had two Junkers 4-cylinder diesels of 1,500 hp to produce speeds of 30/40.9 knots; radius 225 miles at 25 knots. A total of 36 were ordered (most on 29 and 31 July 1940, but KM1 to KM4 were ordered on 26 August, and KM25 and KM26 on 11 October 1940), but as their engines proved unreliable, they were not used in their intended role and instead most were employed in lakes and rivers, being attached to the Peipusee Flotilla (KM3 to the Ladogasee Flotilla). As minelayers they carried four TMB mines and a single Mg39 gun, plus a crew of 6. 21 boats were equipped with 2 x 450mm fixed stern torpedo tubes replacing the mines, and were reclassed as KS-boats (Kleinst Schnellboote), retaining their original numbers but replacing the "KM" prefix by "KS".

Number	Builder	Commissioned	Reclassed as KS	Fate
KS1	Nordbjaerg & Wedell, Copenhagen	18 December 1941	February 1944	To Finland in 1942; sunk 2 July 1944 but raised; to USSR 1945, fate unknown.
KS2	Nordbjaerg & Wedell, Copenhagen	18 December 1941	February 1944	To Finland in 1942; to USSR 1945, fate unknown.
KS9	Engelbrecht, Berlin	February 1943	October 1943	Destroyed on 18 September 1944.
KS10	Engelbrecht, Berlin	February 1943	December 1943	Destroyed on 18 September 1944.
KS11	Engelbrecht, Berlin	March 1943	March 1943	Given to Croatian Navy in October 1944, fate unknown.
KS12	Engelbrecht, Berlin	1943	December 1943	Destroyed on 18 September 1944.
KS13	Engelbrecht, Berlin	1943	December 1943	Fate unknown.
KS14	Engelbrecht, Berlin	1943	December 1943	Fate unknown.
KS15	Engelbrecht, Berlin	1943	December 1943	Fate unknown.
KS16	Kreigermann, Berlin-Pichelsdorf	December 1941	December 1943	Destroyed on 18 September 1944.
KS17	Kreigermann, Berlin-Pichelsdorf	17 July 1942	March 1943	Given to Croatian Navy in October 1944, fate unknown.
KS18	Kreigermann, Berlin-Pichelsdorf	17 July 1942	March 1943	Given to Croatian Navy in September 1944, fate unknown.
KS20	Reinickewerft, Berlin-Pichelsdorf	17 July 1942	December 1943	Sunk on 5 September 1044 after fire.
KS21	Kreigermann, Berlin-Pichelsdorf	21 July 1942	1943	Given to Croatian Navy in September 1944, fate unknown
KS22	Nordbjaerg & Wedell, Copenhagen	9 June 1942	1943	To Finland in 1942; to USSR 1945, fate unknown.
KS23	Rob. Franz Niederfehme	17 July 1942	1943	Given to Croatian Navy in December 1944; fate unknown.
KS24	Rob. Franz Niederfehme	17 July 1942	1943	Given to Croatian Navy in December 1944; fate unknown.
KS25	Rob. Franz Niederfehme	12 December 1942	1943	Fate unknown.
KS26	Rob. Franz Niederfehme	February 1943	1943	Fate unknown.
KS31	Nordbjaerg & Wedell, Copenhagen	February 1943	1943	Given to Croatian Navy in September 1944, fate unknown.
KS32	Nordbjaerg & Wedell, Copenhagen	February 1943	1943	Given to Croatian Navy in September 1944, fate unknown.

Of the unreclassified boats, KM27 to KM30 were all sunk by Soviet aircraft in the Gulf of Bothnia during 1943.

=== LS-boats (Leichte Schnellboote) ===
Another class of even smaller fast attack boat, not intended to operate independently, but to be based on auxiliary cruisers or other vessels operating in overseas areas. They measured 12.50 x 3.46 x 1.02 m (41 ft x 11 ft 4in x 3 ft 4in). These 2-shaft boats weighed 11.5 - 13 tons. The first six were powered by two Junkers 6-cyl JuMo205 aircraft engines, they reached 38 knots. Later boats had two Daimler-Benz MB507 12-cyl diesels of 2,000 hp reaching 40.9 knots, and with an endurance of 300 miles at 30 knots. They carried two 450mm torpedo tubes (instead of up to 4 mines), but had depth charges and a single 20mm MG (in an enclosed turret), plus 7 men. A total of 34 of these boats were ordered, the prototype from Naglo Werft, Berlin, and all the others from Dornier Werft, Friedrichshafen, but the prototype was not completed and only the next eleven were completed; another six (LS13 to LS18) were taken over by France incomplete following the war's end, and completed for them; the final 16 (LS19 to LS34) were cancelled in 1944.

Number	Builder	Commissioned	Fate
LS1	Naglo Werft	Launched 1940	Never completed as the boat's hull was found to be too heavy.
LS2	Dornier Werft	14 June 1940	Used aboard commerce raider Komet; scuttled on 23 December 1940.
LS3	Dornier Werft	14 October 1940	Used aboard commerce raider Kormoran; destroyed on 20 November 1941.
LS4	Dornier Werft	5 July 1941	Used aboard commerce raider Michel; destroyed on 17 October 1943.
LS5	Dornier Werft	15 October 1941	Used as escort vessel in the Aegean Sea; sunk off Kos in air attack on 2 November 1943.
LS6	Dornier Werft	15 October 1941	Damaged in air raid on Igoumenitsa, 24-25 September 1943 and sank near Preveza on 29 September 1943 in the Ionian Sea while under tow from Corfu to Piraeus for repairs. Her wreck sits at a depth of 96 m (315 ft).
LS7	Dornier Werft	8 October 1943	Grounded on 14 October 1944 off Grado.
LS8	Dornier Werft	20 December 1943	Destroyed by own crew on 21 September 1944 in Phaleron Harbour (Piraeus).
LS9	Dornier Werft	20 January 1944	Destroyed by own crew on 21 September 1944 in Phaleron Harbour (Piraeus).
LS10	Dornier Werft	27 January 1944	Sunk by aircraft on 14 October 1944 off Volos.
LS11	Dornier Werft	18 May 1944	Destroyed by own crew on 21 September 1944 in Phaleron Harbour (Piraeus).
LS12	Dornier Werft	12 July 1944	To USSR in 1945, and scrapped.

Source: https://www.german-navy.de/kriegsmarine/ships/index.html

== See also ==
- Daimler-Benz DB 602, V-16 diesel aero-engine that was developed into the MB502 and MB501.
- Fast Attack Craft War Badge
- List of Knight's Cross recipients of the Schnellboot service
- R boat
- Steam gun boat
