= Lürssen effect =

Effect in high-speed ship propulsion

The Lürssen effect, used in the design of high-speed boats, is a reduction in wave-making resistance provided by two small rudders mounted on each side of the main rudder and turned outboard. These rudders force the water under the hull outward, lifting the stern, thus reducing drag, and lowering the wake height, which "requires less energy, allowing the vessel to go faster". The effect was discovered by the German shipbuilding company Lürssen Werft based in Bremen-Vegesack. The Lürssen effect is best remembered for its use during the Second World War in the various classes of German Schnellboot, or fast torpedo attack boats.

The effect was noticed at speeds above 25 knots, by swinging the "effect" rudders outboard by 30°. Once attained, the effect rudders could be swing back to 17° outboard, and the speed could be reduced to as little as 20 kn while still maintaining the benefits of the effect.

== Development ==
The adoption of a round-bottomed displacement hull shape (which was more efficient than the more common hard chine V-bottom) together with powerful engines allowed the Lürssen shipyard to attain a high speed of 33 kn with its motor boat Lür of 1926. The displacement hull was superior due to its performance in rough seas. A planing hull, sitting down at the stern, would lose speed when a big wave slapped against the hull. The displacement hull tends to stay more level and "plow through" the wave. This hull shape was further developed as a torpedo boat (later called Schnellboot) of the Reichsmarine or German Navy.

The first of the torpedo boats (the British called them "E-Boats") was UZ (S).16 (which was a development of the motor yacht Oheka II, itself developed from the Lür) which was commissioned into the Reichsmarine in 1930. It was renamed S-1 in 1932.

During test runs with S-2, the first boat from series production, it was then accidentally discovered that the boat stopped responding to the rudder at high speed and full rudder positions but started to display the effects described above. When investigating what caused this behaviour, the basic principles of the Lürssen effect were discovered. Starting with S-2, the following boats were then equipped with the two small rudders on either side of the main rudder which could be angled outboard up to 30°.

A wedge was added under the rear of the hull from S-18. The wedge further added to the effect of helping the craft to stay level at high speed.
