= Southdown, Cornwall =

Village in Cornwall, England

Coordinates: 50°21′11″N 4°12′32″W

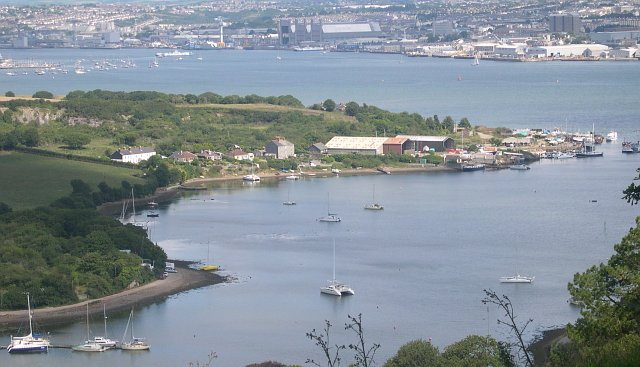
Southdown on the Insworke Peninsula

Southdown is a coastal village in south-east Cornwall, England, United Kingdom. It is situated on the banks of the Hamoaze east of Millbrook on the Rame Peninsula, about five miles (8 km) south of Saltash.

Southdown Quay was originally built as a naval victualling yard and later became a brickworks. The quay is now the home of Southdown Marina.
