= Barbara K =

Barbara K may refer to:

- Barbara Kooyman, American singer-songwriter
- Barbara Kavovit, American author
