= Otto Hermann Kahn =

American banker

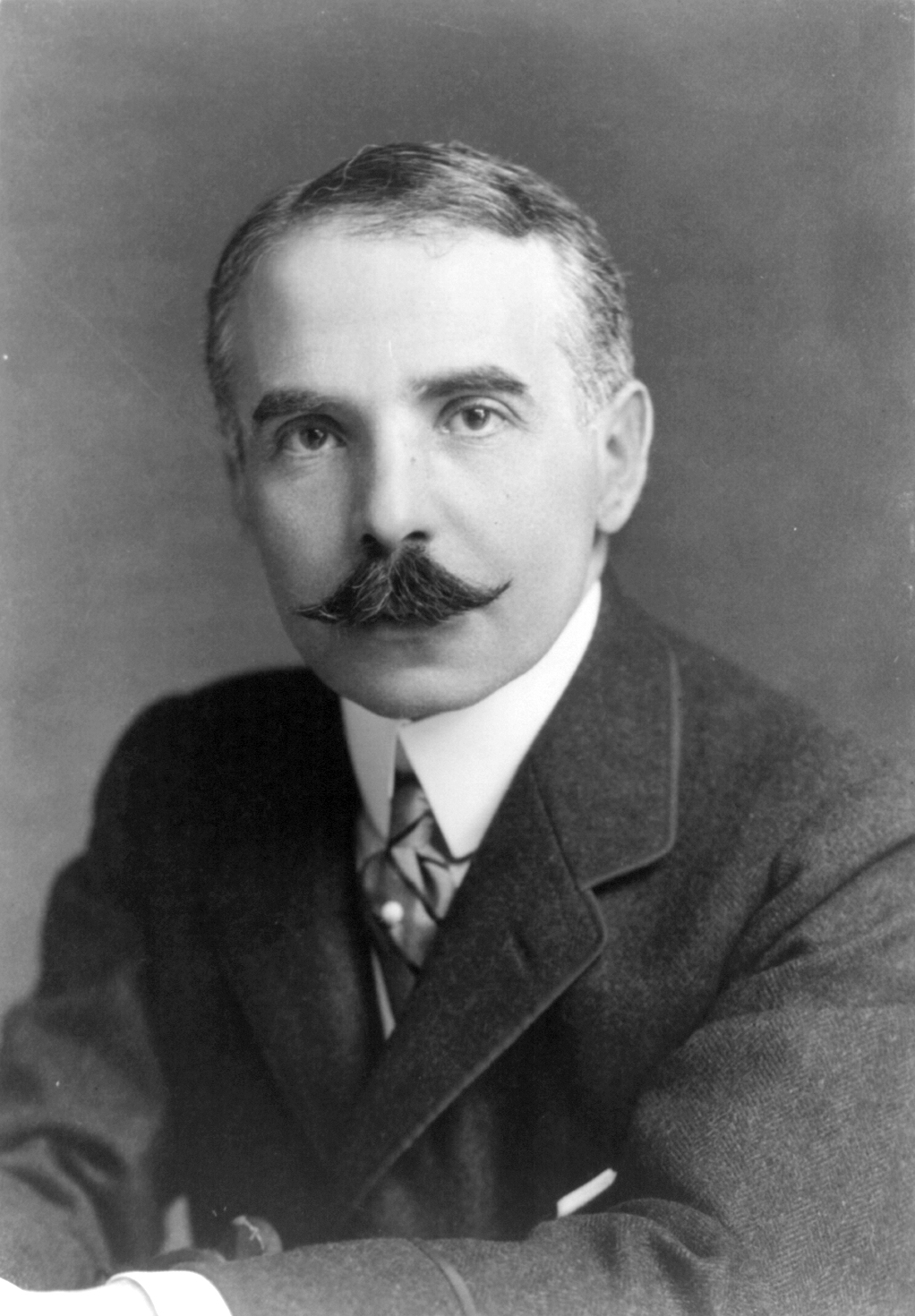
- Kahn in 1909
- Born: February 21, 1867; Mannheim, Grand Duchy of Baden
- Died: March 29, 1934 (aged 67); New York City, United States
- Resting place: St. John's Memorial Cemetery, Laurel Hollow, New York
- Occupation: Banker
- Employer: Kuhn, Loeb & Co.
- Spouse: Addie Wolff (m. 1896)
- Children: 4, including Roger
- Relatives: Virginia Ogilvy, Countess of Airlie (granddaughter)

Signature
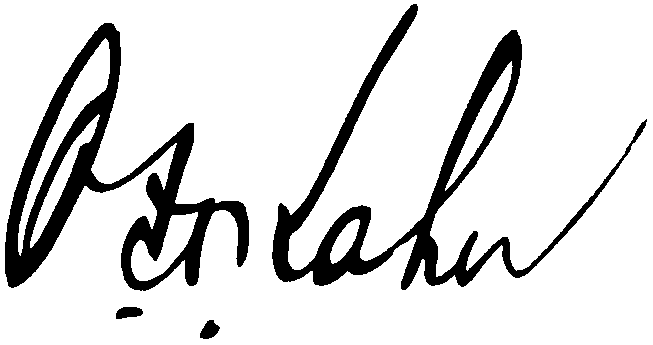

Otto Hermann Kahn (February 21, 1867 – March 29, 1934) was a German-born American investment banker, collector, philanthropist, and patron of the arts. Kahn was a well-known figure, appearing on the cover of Time magazine and was sometimes referred to as the "King of New York". In business, he was best known as a partner at Kuhn, Loeb & Co. who reorganized and consolidated railroads. In his personal life, he was a great patron of the arts, where among things, he served as the chairman of the Metropolitan Opera.

== Life and career ==
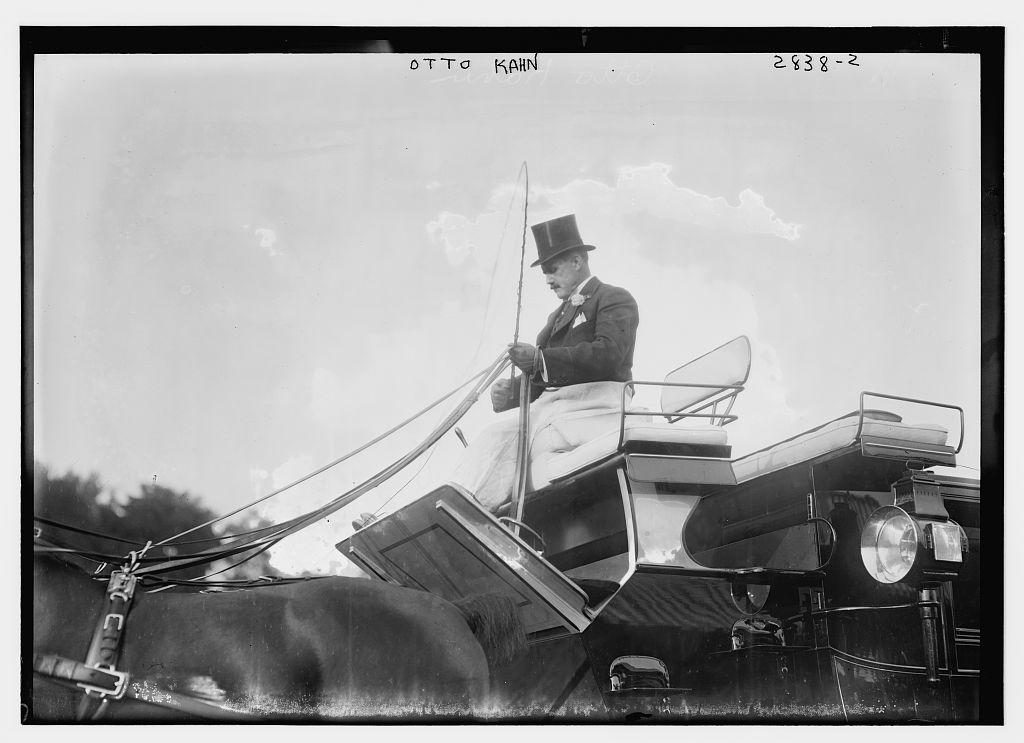
Kahn at the Morristown Field Club on September 25, 1913

Otto was born on February 21, 1867, in Mannheim, Grand Duchy of Baden, and raised there, by his Jewish parents, Emma (née Eberstadt) and Bernard Kahn. His father had been among the refugees to the United States after the revolution of 1848 and had become an American citizen, but later returned to Germany. Kahn was educated in a gymnasium in Mannheim.

Kahn's ambition was to be a musician, and he learned to play several instruments before he graduated from the gymnasium. His father however, had other plans. As one of eight children, a career path had been laid for each one. At 17, Kahn was placed in a bank at Karlsruhe as a junior clerk, where he remained for three years, advancing until he was thoroughly grounded in the intricacies of finance. He then served for a year in the Kaiser's hussars.

On leaving the army he went to the London agency of Deutsche Bank, where he remained for five years. He displayed such unusual talent that he became second-in-command when he had been there but a comparatively short time. The English mode of life, both political and social, appealed to him, and eventually he became a naturalized British subject.

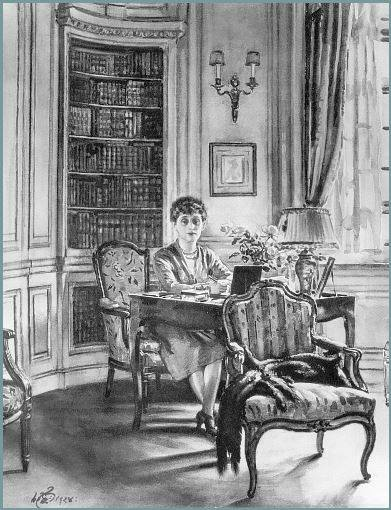
Addie Wolff, wife of Otto H. Kahn, 1928

In 1893, he accepted an offer from Speyer and Company of New York and went to the United States, where he spent the rest of his life. On January 8, 1896, Kahn married Addie Wolff and following the couple's year-long tour of Europe, Kahn joined Kuhn, Loeb & Co. in New York City, where his father-in-law, Abraham Wolff, was a partner. In 1917, Kahn gave up his British nationality and became a United States citizen.

Besides his father-in-law, Kahn's other partners included Jacob Schiff, himself the son-in-law of Solomon Loeb, who co-founded the firm, and Paul and Felix Warburg. Almost immediately, Kahn was thrown into contact with railroad builder E. H. Harriman. In spite of sharply defined differences in temperament and method, they became as brothers. In opposition to Harriman's gruff, domineering, aggressive manner in business, was Kahn's calm, good-humored, almost gentle deportment. Kahn, although only 30 years old, took an almost equal part with Harriman in the gigantic task of reorganizing the Union Pacific Railroad, a work which in its early stages had been handled by Schiff. Kahn proved his ability to analyze mathematically and scientifically the problems that were constantly presented.

Kahn was soon to be acknowledged as the ablest reorganizer of railroads in the United States. He applied himself to the Baltimore and Ohio Railroad, the Missouri Pacific Railroad, the Wabash Railroad, the Chicago and Eastern Illinois Railroad, the Texas and Pacific Railroad, and other systems. More than once, his prompt and vigorous action averted an imminent financial panic. A notable instance was his rescuing from collapse the Pearson-Farquhar syndicate when it found itself in deep water in an attempt to combine several existing lines of railroad into a South American transcontinental system.

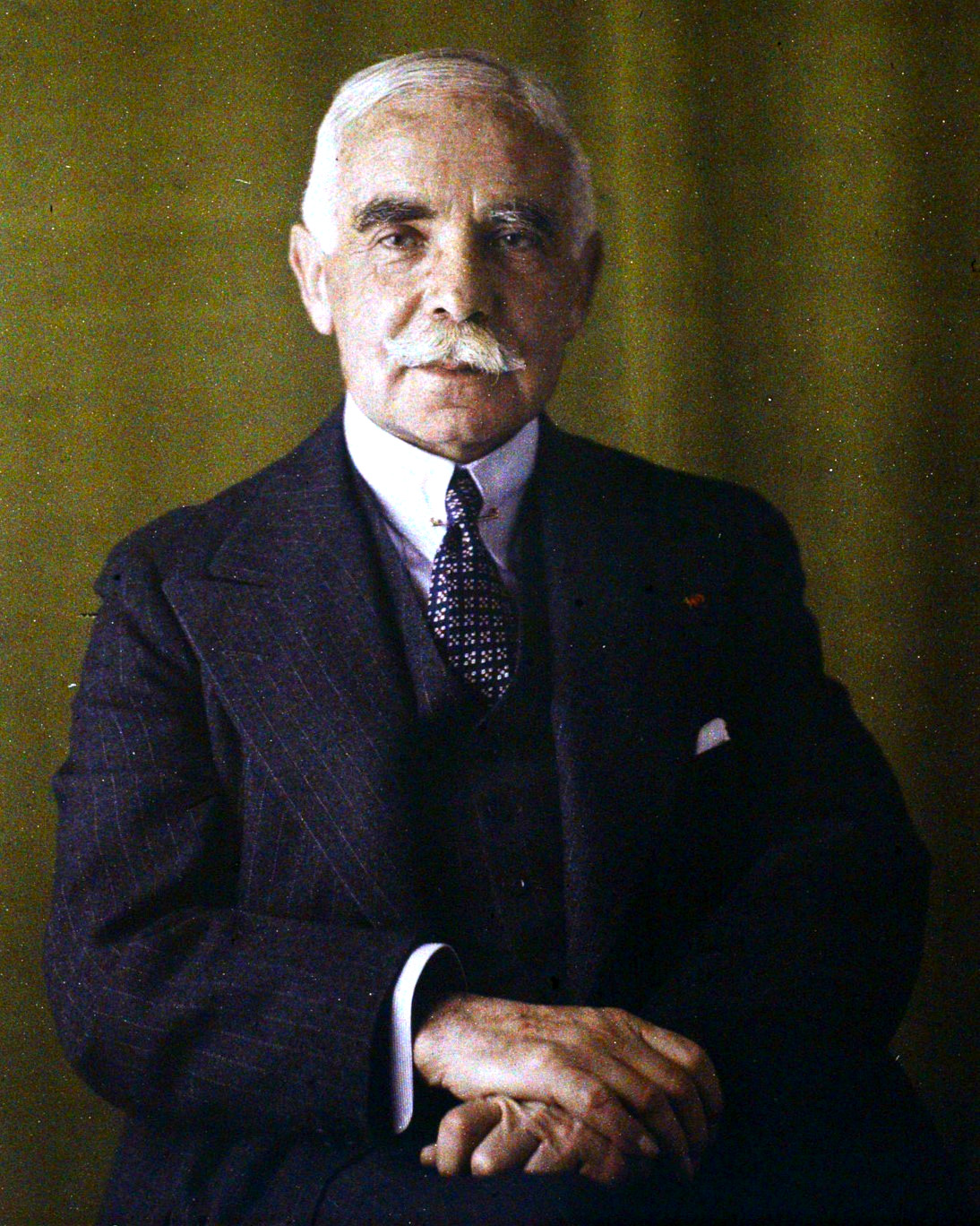
Autochrome by Georges Chevalier, 1931

When American International Corporation was forming, Kahn took an active part in the negotiations, and brought them to a successful issue. Kahn conducted negotiations which led to the opening of the doors of the Paris Bourse to American securities and the listing there of $50,000,000 Pennsylvania bonds in 1906, the first official listing of American securities in Paris. Also he had a large share later in the negotiations which resulted in the issue by Kuhn, Loeb and Company of $50,000,000 of City of Paris bonds and $60,000,000 Bordeaux-Lyons and Marseilles bonds.

In 1933, the smooth and affable Kahn successfully disarmed antagonism against members of the banking community during four days of testimony before the United States Senate's Pecora Commission hearings into the Wall Street Crash of 1929. The Senate's lead counsel Ferdinand Pecora wrote on page 293 in his 1939 memoir Wall Street Under Oath about Otto Kahn: "No suaver, more fluent, and more diplomatic advocate could be conceived. If anyone could succeed in presenting the customs and functions of the private bankers in a favorable and prepossessing light, it was he."

Kahn was a trustee of the Massachusetts Institute of Technology and of Rutgers College. He was a director in numerous corporations, including the Equitable Trust Co. of New York and the Union Pacific Railroad.

During the last years of Kahn's life he became increasingly frail and suffered from arteriosclerosis, high blood pressure and attacks of angina pectoris. On March 29, 1934, following lunch in the private dining room of Kuhn, Loeb & Co., Kahn suffered a massive heart attack and died, aged 67. Funeral services were held in the music room of his Long Island estate, followed by a burial in nearby St. John's Memorial Cemetery.

== Patron of the arts ==
An extremely wealthy financier, Kahn was president and chairman of the board of directors of the Metropolitan Opera, vice-president of the New York Philharmonic and treasurer for the American Federation of Arts. He supported many artists, including Hart Crane, George Gershwin and Arturo Toscanini. He was also smitten with Hollywood, to which Kuhn Loeb provided much commercial support and Kahn, personal support. In her second full-length film, Be Yourself, Fanny Brice sang a song that mentioned Kahn: "Is something the matter with Otto Kahn, or is something wrong with me? I wrote a note and told him what a star I would make. He sent it back and marked it 'Opened by mistake.'"

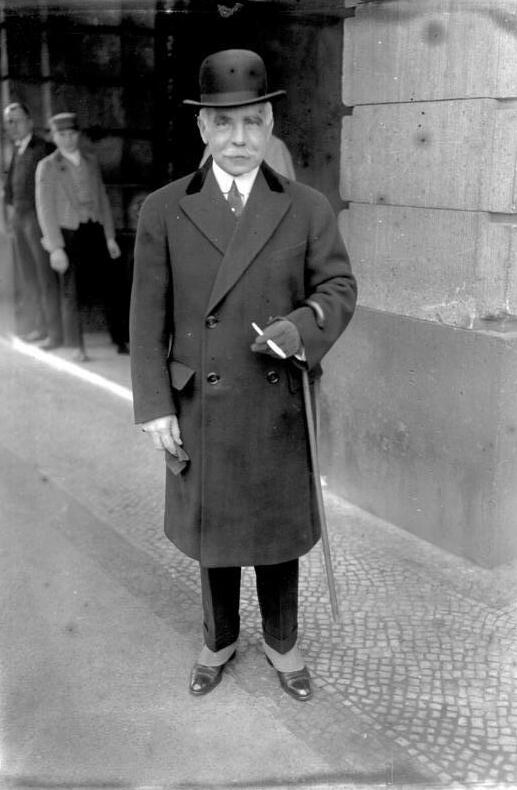
Otto Hermann Kahn in Berlin, 1931

He was parodied as Roscoe W. Chandler in the stage and film versions of the Marx Brothers' Animal Crackers.

Kahn was chairman of the New York committee of the Shakespeare Tercentenary (1916). He was elected to honorary membership in Phi Mu Alpha Sinfonia music fraternity by the Fraternity's Alpha chapter at the New England Conservatory in 1917 and of the French Theatre of New York and a founder and later treasurer of the New Theatre Company.

Otto's son, Roger Wolfe Kahn, was a popular jazz musician and bandleader of the late 1920s and early 1930s. Kahn's daughter, Margaret, married John Barry Ryan II and was a New York society doyenne and benefactor of the Metropolitan Opera.

It is sometimes claimed that one of Otto Kahn's most enduring achievements is his uncanny lookalike persona that purportedly became the iconic mascot for the Monopoly board game. However, the family of the illustrator Daniel Fox, who in 1936 created the mascot Rich Uncle Pennybags for the Monopoly board game, in 2013, credited J. P. Morgan as being the inspiration for the character.

== Builder ==
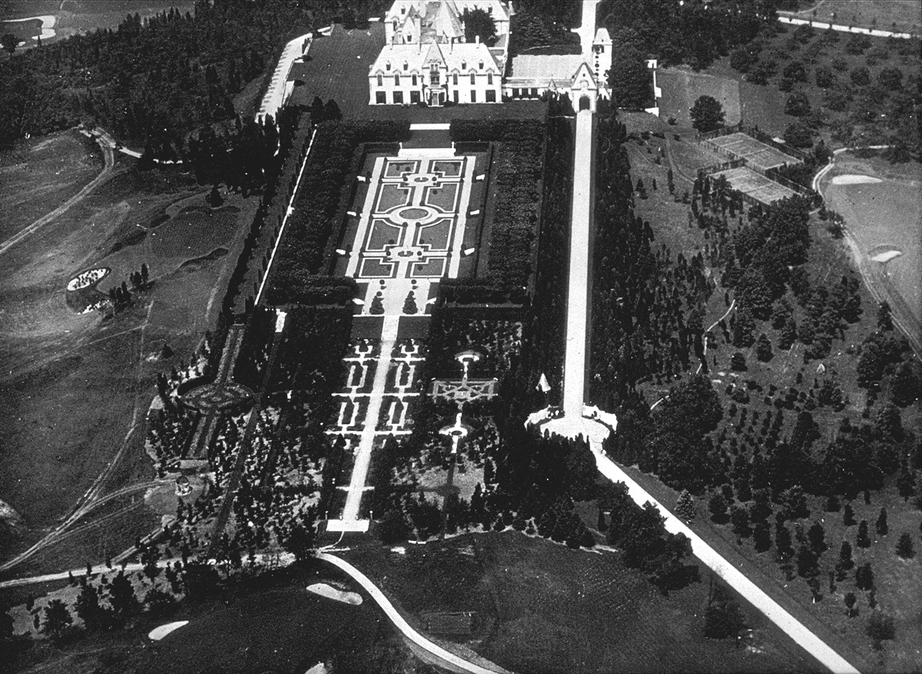
Aerial view of Oheka Castle

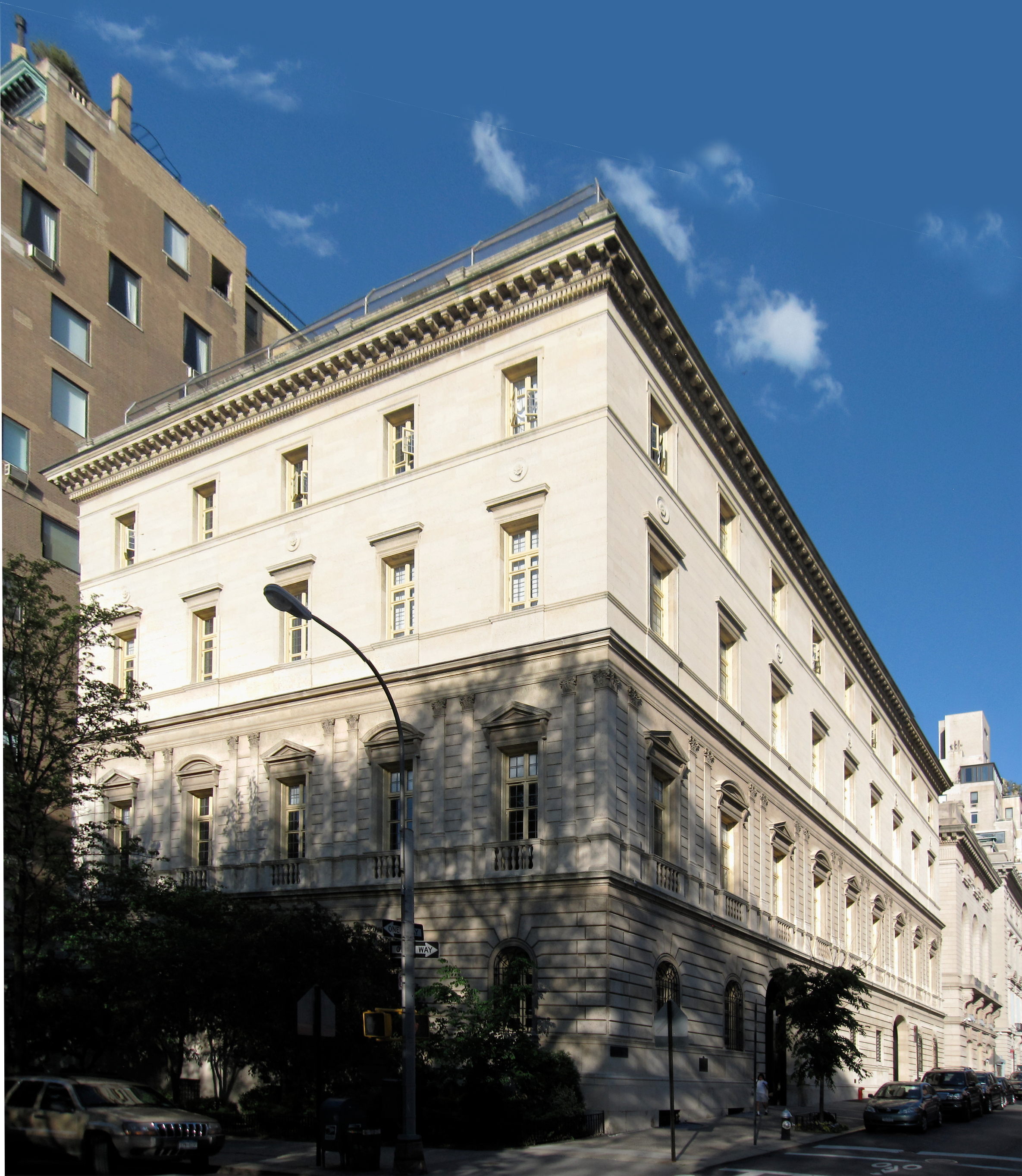
Otto H. Kahn House

As was typical for men of his stature of the era, Kahn maintained both a New York City residence and a home in the country. Kahn's original country home, Cedar Grove, a gift from his father-in-law and designed by Carrère and Hastings was in Morristown, New Jersey. Although a resident there for a number of years and a business associate of many of his neighbors, antisemitism was still prevalent and Kahn was never accepted by Morristown society. Social rejection led him to move to Long Island and his New Jersey estate ultimately became home to Honeywell.

By 1919, Kahn had assembled a 443-acre (179 ha) estate on Long Island, and had Oheka Castle (from Otto Hermann Kahn) built as its centerpiece. At 109,000 square feet (10,100 m^{2}), the 127-room structure was designed as the second-largest private residence in the United States (after George Vanderbilt's 175,000-square-foot (16,300 m^{2}) Biltmore Estate in Asheville, North Carolina) by Delano & Aldrich of New York City; its landscaping was designed by Olmsted Brothers, sons of Frederick Law Olmsted of Brookline, Massachusetts. The property featured a golf course, a working farm, a private airstrip, and numerous outbuildings.

Following Kahn's death in 1934, the property was sold to the City of New York for use as a retreat for sanitation workers and then later a government training school for merchant marine radio operators. In the late 1940s, an upscale housing development was constructed there and in 1948, the Eastern Military Academy (EMA) purchased the mansion and 23 acres (9.3 ha) around it. (One of the former EMA cadets has written his memories going to school there.) By the time the school went bankrupt thirty years later, the gardens had been bulldozed, its rooms subdivided and the paneled walls painted over. Following the departure of EMA, vandals repeatedly set fire to the building, but because Kahn had insisted on constructing a concrete, brick and steel structure, the house survived. In 1984 a local developer, Gary Melius, purchased the estate for $1.5 million and began the largest private renovation project ever attempted in the United States. Today, Oheka is used as a catering facility, hotel and conference center.

Following his acquisition in 1913 of the property at 1 East 91st Street in New York City from Andrew Carnegie, Kahn commissioned J. Armstrong Stenhouse and C. P. H. Gilbert to design his Carnegie Hill mansion. The home, an 80-room Italian Renaissance-palazzo style mansion, was modeled after the Cancelleria in Rome. Completed in 1918, it served as Kahn's New York City residence until his death. Shortly thereafter, the house was sold to the Convent of the Sacred Heart, an independent Catholic girls school. In 1974 the house was designated a landmark by the New York City Landmarks Preservation Commission.

In Palm Beach, Florida, Kahn built a summer home on Sunset Avenue, naming it "Oheka". When this house proved too small, he built another "Oheka" at 691 North County Road. Following his death, this house was used by the Graham-Eckes School. In the 2000s, it was acquired by businessman Robert Cohen and returned to private use.

== Boat owner ==
In 1927, Kahn commissioned German boat builder Lürssen to build a high-speed motor yacht for use on the river Rhine and in the North Sea. Designed using a classical round bottomed hull, she had a composite wooden plank over alloy metal frame structure. But innovative hull design meant that her hull flattened towards the rear third, and with her three 500 hp Maybach engines positioned forward in her 22.5-meter (74 ft) hull, the resultant counterbalance and high power gave her a 34-knot top speed, the highest in her class for the day. Oheka II came to the notice of the German Navy, resulting in their development of the Schnellboot high speed torpedo craft within the restrictions of the Treaty of Versailles.

== Personal life ==
Kahn's father was Bernhard Kahn, a son of Michael Kahn and Franziska Baer, a German-Jewish industrialist and banker who participated in the 1848 Revolt, and was condemned to death. He escaped to the United States, was naturalized an American citizen, and then returned to Germany ten years later to court and on October 17, 1860, married Emma Stephanie Eberstadt, whom he married on the condition that he not return to the United States. The couple had eight children and Otto was the third son.

He married Adelaide Wolff on January 8, 1896. They had four children: Maud; Margaret, whose daughter Virginia Ryan became Virginia Ogilvy, Countess of Airlie; Gilbert; and Roger Wolff Kahn.

Kahn was buried in the St. John's Memorial Cemetery in Laurel Hollow, New York.

American stock broker Eugene J. Kahn was his cousin.

== Selected books and speeches by Kahn ==
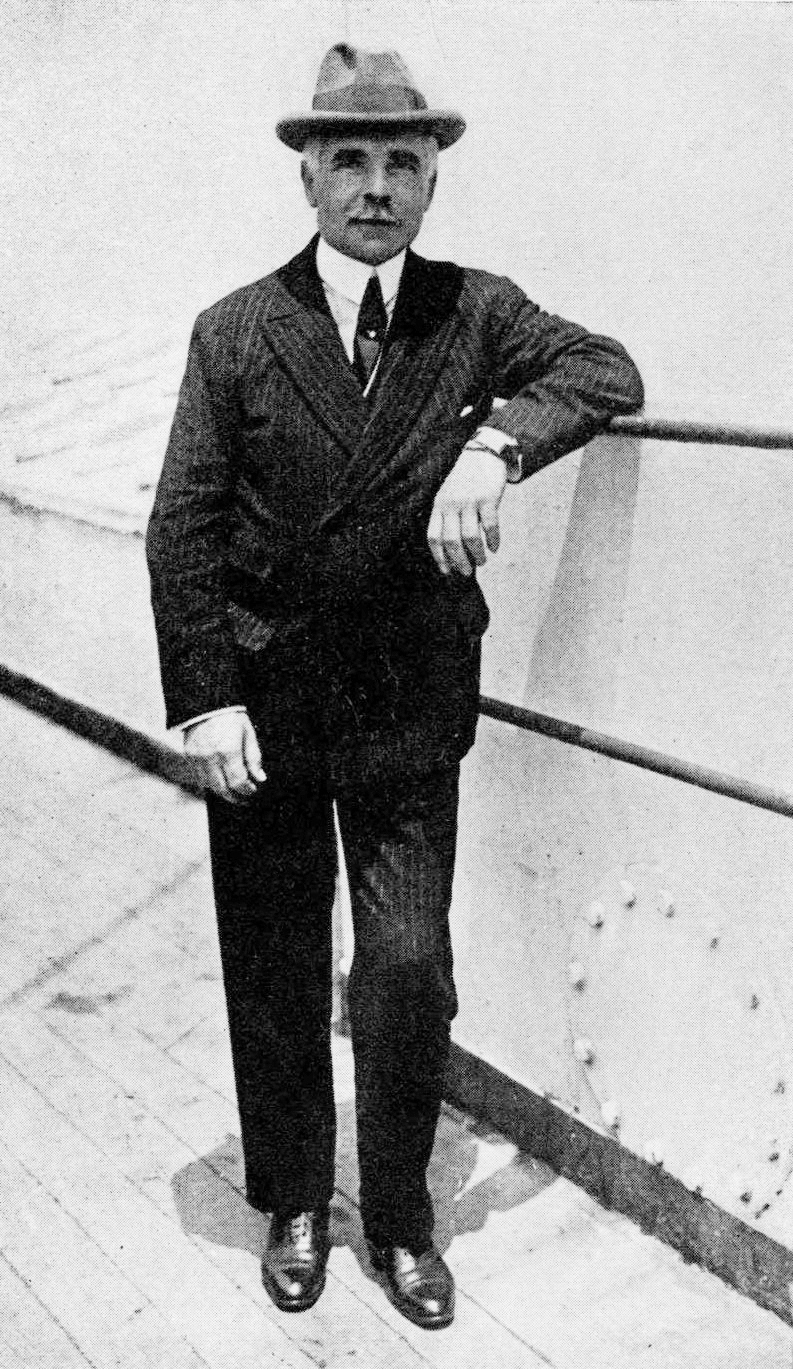
Otto Hermann Kahn, 1922

- Edward Henry Harriman: An address delivered before the Finance Forum in New York on January 25, 1911 (1911)
- Art and the People (1916)
- The Government and Railroads (1916)
- High Finance (1916)
- The War and Business (1917)
- War Taxation: Some Comments and Letters (1917)
- The New York Stock Exchange and Public Opinion: Remarks at Annual Dinner Association of Stock Exchange Brokers Held at the Astor Hotel New York, January 24, 1917 (New York: The New York Stock Exchange, 1917)
- Americans of German Origin and the War: Extracts from an address before the Merchants Association of New York at its Liberty Loan Meeting June 1, 1917 (1917)
- Prussianized Germany: Americans of Foreign Descent and America's Cause (1917)
- Taxation: A Letter (1918)
- Right Above Race (New York: The Century Co., 1918)
- The Poison Growth of Prussianism (1918)
- The Menace of Paternalism (1918)
- When the Tide Turned: The American Attack at Chateau Thierry and Belleau Wood in the First Week of June, 1918 (1918)
- Frenzied Liberty: The Myth of “A Rich Man’s War” (1918)
- Government Ownership of Railroads: An Address Before the National Industrial Conference Board, New York, October 10, 1918 (1918)
- The Common Cause: Britain's Part in the Great War (1918)
- Some Comments on War Taxation (1918)
- Suggestions Concerning the Railroad Problem (1919)
- Capital and Labor, a Fair Deal: Extracts From an Address (1919)
- Let Us Reason Together (1919)
- Two Years of Faulty Taxation (1920)
- Our Economic and Other Problems: A Financier's Point of View (1920)
- Reflections of a Financier: A Study of Economic and Other Problems (1921)
- The Civic Aspect of Art: Address on the Occasion of the Inaugural Recital of New York's Music Week, May 1st, 1922 (1922)
- Immediate Problems: An Address December 12, 1922 (New York: Committee of American Business Men, 1922)
- A Plea for Prosperity (New York: Committee of American Business Men, 1922)
- An "International Banker's" View of the League of nations: An Address Delivered Before the Rochester Chamber of Commerce, Rochester, N.Y. (1923)
- The Value of Art to the People: An address by Mr. Otto K. Kahn at the annual dinner of the American Federation of Arts held in Washington on May 16, 1924 (1924)
- The Myth of American Imperialism: Address Delivered at a Meeting of the League for Industrial Democracy, in New York, on December 30, 1924. (1924) Other speakers included Edwin Meade Earle, Morris Hillquit and Scott Nearing.
- Of Many Things: Being Reflections and Impressions on International Affairs, Domestic Topics and the Arts (1926)

== See also ==
- Kahn Lectures
- List of covers of Time magazine (1920s)
