= Oheka Castle =

Historic house in New York, United States

- U.S. National Register of Historic Places
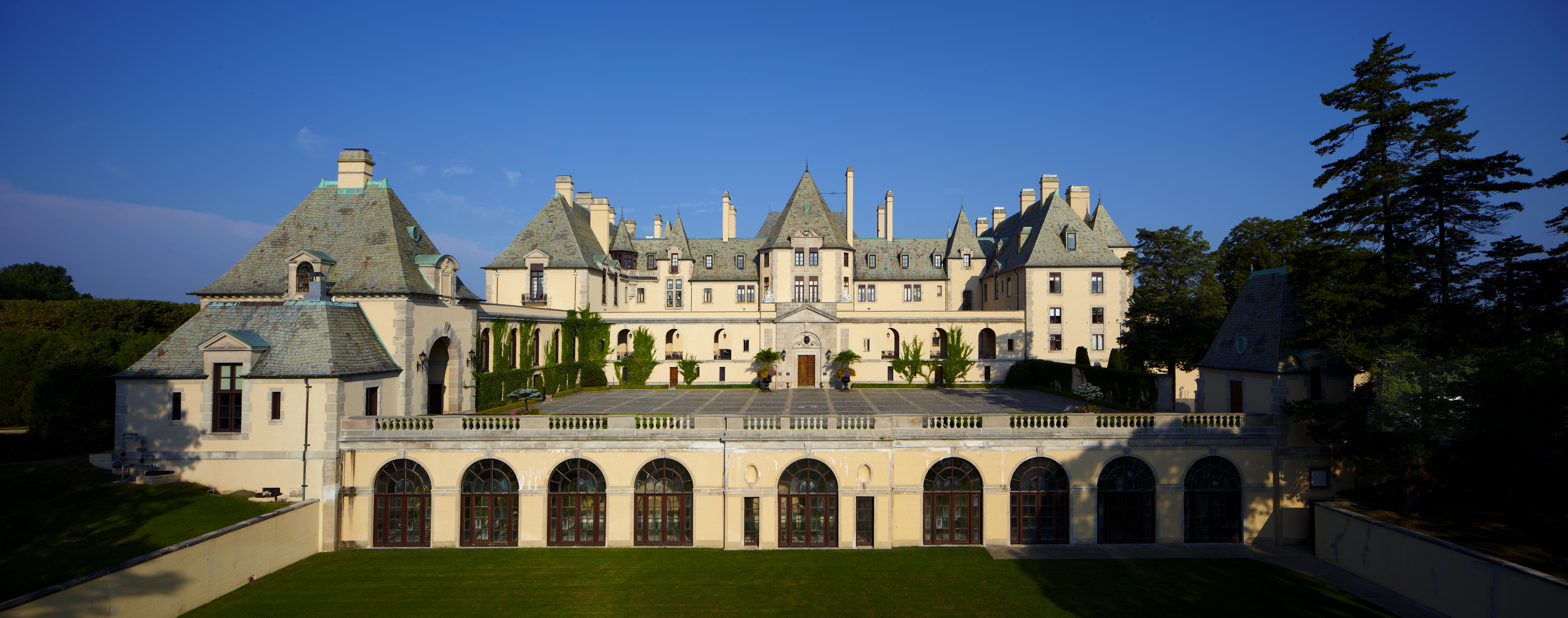
- Oheka Castle seen from the east

- Location within New York Location within the United States
- Interactive map showing Oheka Castle's location
- Location: 135 W. Gate Drive, Huntington, New York
- Coordinates: 40°49′44″N 73°26′54″W
- Area: 23.2 acres (9.4 ha)
- Built: 1914–1919
- Architects: Delano & Aldrich; Olmsted Brothers, et al.
- Architectural style: Late 19th and Early 20th Century American Movements, Chateauesque
- NRHP reference No.: 04000996
- Added to NRHP: September 15, 2004

Oheka Castle, also known as the Otto Kahn Estate, is a hotel located on the North Shore (or "Gold Coast") of Long Island, in West Hills, New York, a hamlet in the town of Huntington. It was the country home of investment financier and philanthropist Otto Hermann Kahn and his family.

The name "Oheka" is an acronym using the first several letters of each part of its creator's name, Otto Hermann Kahn, which Kahn also used to name his yacht Oheka II and his oceanfront Villa Oheka in Palm Beach, Florida. The mansion, built by Kahn between 1914 and 1919, is the largest private home in New York, and the second largest in the United States, comprising 127 rooms and over 109,000 ft^{2} (10,100 m^{2}), as originally configured. It is said to be built on the highest point on Long Island.

The castle is now a hotel with 32 guest rooms and suites. It is a popular wedding venue for socialites, celebrities and dignitaries, as well as the backdrop to many photo shoots, television series and films. It also offers a bar, restaurant, and mansion tours of the estate and gardens.

In 2004, Oheka was listed on the National Register of Historic Places. It is a member of Historic Hotels of America, the official program of the National Trust for Historic Preservation.

== History ==
=== Early history ===
Kahn built Oheka in response to Jews being forbidden entry to clubs and golf courses in Morristown, New Jersey, and because Cedar Court, a previous country home of Kahn's, was virtually destroyed by fire in 1905. He was determined to build a fireproof building, so he had his architects, Delano and Aldrich, design it in steel and concrete, making it one of the first totally fireproof residential buildings. Two years were spent building an artificial hill on which to place the home, giving it views of Cold Spring Hills and Cold Spring Harbor.

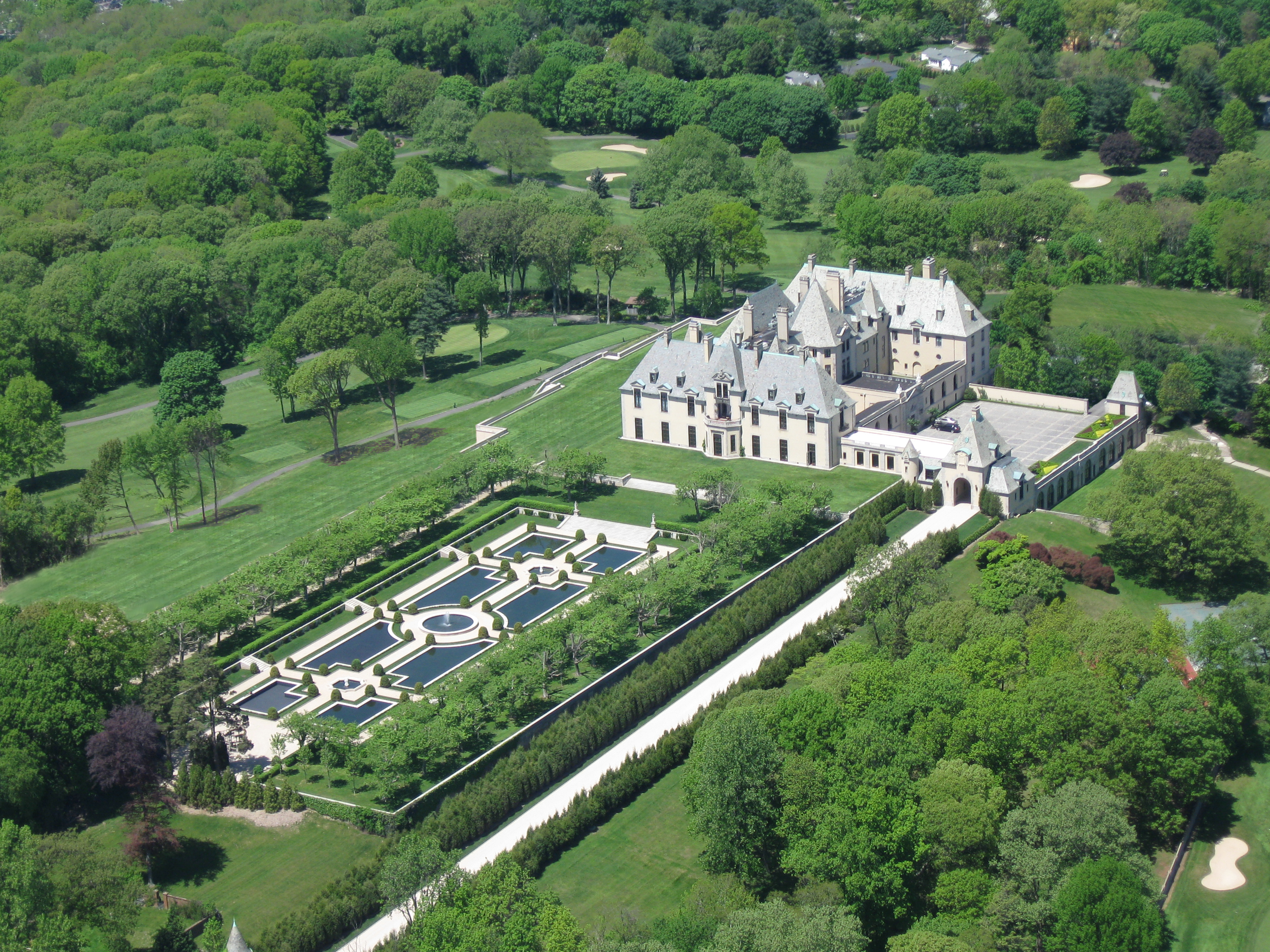
Aerial view of the castle and its gardens (2009)

Kahn commissioned the Olmsted Brothers to design the estate's grounds, centered on a formal axial sunken garden in the French manner, of clipped greens and gravel in parterres and water terraces, screened by high clipped hedging from the entrance drive that runs parallel to the main axis. Other features of the 443-acre (179 ha) complex included an 18-hole golf course designed by golf architect Seth Raynor, one of the largest private greenhouse complexes in America, tennis courts, an indoor swimming pool, a landing strip, orchards, and stables.

Several years after Kahn's death in 1934, the estate was sold. After the sale, it was used for several purposes, including as a retreat for New York City sanitation workers. In 1948, Eastern Military Academy purchased the castle and 23 acres (9.3 ha) of its property, bulldozed the gardens and subdivided the rooms. The school occupied the house until it closed in 1979. For the next four years, the building remained empty, during which time over 100 documented arson attempts occurred, all of which the building survived, demonstrating Kahn's success in building a fireproof building. In 1946 the golf course and stables became part of the Cold Spring Country Club, and the greenhouse complex operated as Otto Keil Florist. Much of the remainder of the property was developed into single-family homes.

=== Melius ownership ===
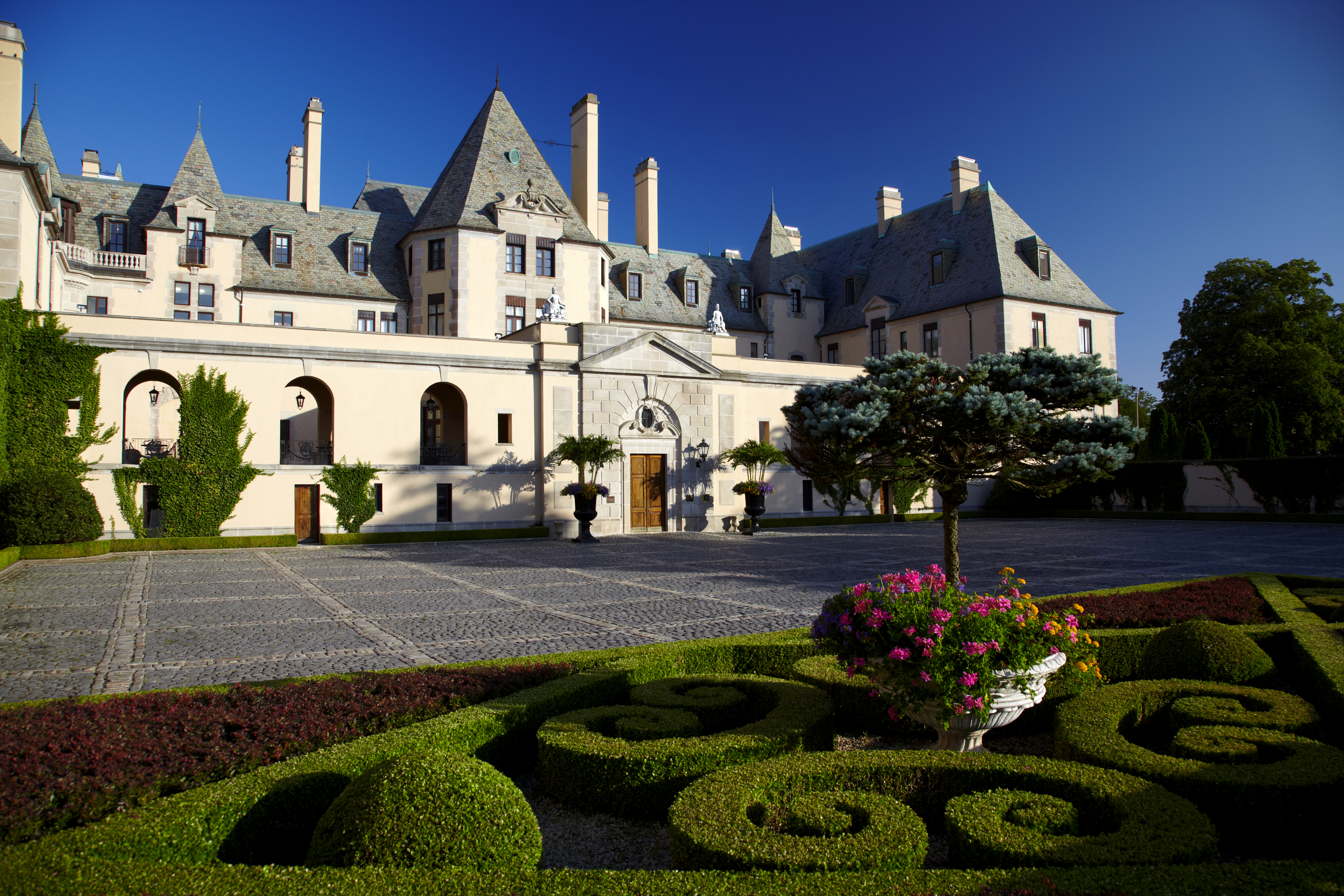
Oheka Castle courtyard view

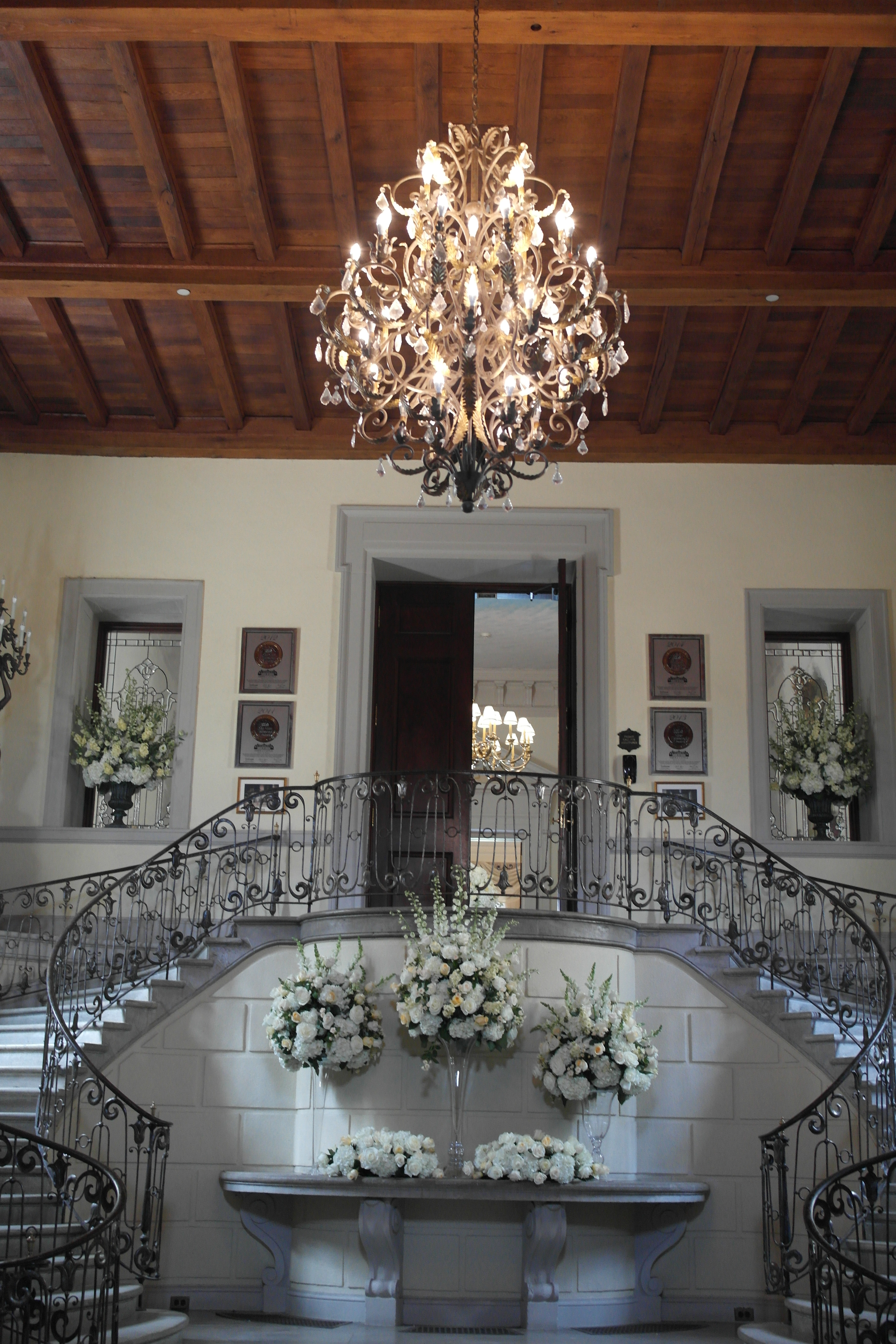
Main staircase

In 1984, Oheka was purchased by Gary Melius, a Long Island developer. Melius undertook the largest private residential renovation project in the United States to restore the house, which was in a state of almost total disrepair, and recreate the gardens from the original Olmsted plans. In 1988, unable to continue financing the massive project, Melius sold the property to Japanese businessman Hideki Yokoi for $22.5 million (equivalent to $52,800,000 in 2025). Ten years later, following a lawsuit, the building passed to one of Yokoi's daughters and her husband. They were unable to sustain the property themselves, so Melius reacquired it under a long-term lease and later re-purchased the estate, operating it as a weddings and events venue, luxury hotel and conference center.

Celebrities who have been married there include Curtis Martin, Kevin Jonas, Megyn Kelly, Joey Fatone, Brian McKnight, former U.S. congressman Anthony Weiner, and comedian Yannis Pappas.

On February 24, 2014, Melius survived a gunshot to the head by a masked gunman in the parking lot of the castle.

In July 2025, Melius filed for Chapter 11 bankruptcy protection as part of a plan to prevent a foreclosure sale on the Oheka Castle. The next year, the castle was placed for sale at a foreclosure auction. Gold Coast Property & Estate Management bought the castle in October 2026 for $72 million but did not immediately provide a 10% down payment.

== In popular culture ==
- Oheka served as partial inspiration for Gatsby's estate in F. Scott Fitzgerald's The Great Gatsby.
- In the 1941 film Citizen Kane, photographs of Oheka were used to portray the fictional Xanadu.
- In Dream World, his collection of songs, poems and stories, composer and musicologist Roger Lee Hall wrote about his years attending Eastern Military Academy at Oheka Castle in the 1950s.
- The castle was the filming location of the music video for Julio Iglesias' and Dolly Parton's 1994 duet "When You Tell Me That You Love Me".
- R&B singer Brandy's 1995 music video "Brokenhearted", directed by Hype Williams and featuring Wanya Morris, was filmed inside the castle.
- It was the location of a charity event in the television show Louie, where Jerry Seinfeld and Louis C.K. performed for the event.
- The science fiction novel Time for Patriots has a very thinly disguised military academy in a similarly disguised version of Oheka.
- It served as the mansion "Shadow Pond" in the television show Royal Pains, which ran from 2009 to 2016.
- Oheka was the set of the fictional Avalon Castle in the 2010 soap opera As the World Turns.
- The castle was the primary filming location of the music video for Taylor Swift's 2014 song "Blank Space".
- The castle was also used in the music video "Cookie" by recording artist R. Kelly.
- The castle was featured on Travel Channel's "Mega Mansions" that also streams on Netflix. The premise of the show was to give viewers an "all-access pass inside America's most enormous, opulent and advanced Mega Mansions."
- The castle and grounds were featured in Liam Payne and Rita Ora's "For You" written for the Fifty Shades Freed movie soundtrack.
- Oheka was used as the setting for the "Mr. Julius Caesar" rematch in the film The Emperor's Club.
- The castle was used as the setting for the Real Housewives of New York City Season 12 reunion, the first in-person Real Housewives reunion filmed amid the COVID-19 pandemic in the United States.
- The castle was featured in the music video for Jennifer Lopez and Maluma's 2020 song "Pa' Ti + Lonely".
- The castle was featured in a MrBeast video in which the MrBeast crew was tasked to stay in a $1 hotel to a $1,000,000 hotel (the million dollar hotel is Oheka castle).
- Oheka stood in for a Hungarian castle in the second season of Succession, titled "Hunting," which featured a wild boar hunting and a humiliating game called "Boar on the Floor".

== See also ==
- List of Historic Hotels of America
