= Oheka II =

1927 motor yacht

Class overview
- Name: Oheka II
- Builders: Lürssen
- Completed: 1
- Active: 0

General characteristics
- Type: Yacht
- Displacement: 22.5 tonnes (22,500 kg)
- Length: 22.5 m (74 ft)
- Propulsion: 3 x Maybach VL2 V-12
- Speed: 34 knots

Oheka II was a private motor yacht built for German-born American investment banker Otto Hermann Kahn by Lürssen in 1927. Capable of 34 knots top speed, she became the blueprint for the Kriegsmarine's Schnellboot.

"Oheka" is an acronym of letters from Kahn's full name, Otto Herman Kahn. He had previously named his New York estate, built on Long Island between 1914 and 1919, Oheka.

== Oheka II ==
Born in 1867 in Mannheim and relocated to the United States in 1893, Otto Hermann Kahn was an American-based investment banker, collector, philanthropist, and patron of the arts.

Kahn approached German boatbuilder Lürssen in 1926 to build a high-speed motor launch capable of use on holidays upon both the River Rhine and the North Sea.

German boat builders at the time were used to building sleek displacement hull cruising boats for the Rhine, which to create a smooth ride were round bottomed. However, the problem this creates is a greater depth in the water, and a resultant increase in hydro-dynamic drag, reducing speed. While running downriver this was not a concern, but a high-speed launch would require more power running upriver and in the ocean.

Lürssen sought to reduce hydrodynamic drag on Kahn’s yacht by reducing hull weight, exposing less of its round bottomed hull below the surface. It did this by forming a composite shell of wooden planks over an alloy metal frame. To counter the inefficient tendency of round hulls to "squat" stern-down in the water at high speeds, two counterbalancing measures were taken:

- flattening the hull towards the stern, providing hydrodynamic lift where it was needed
- positioning the engines forward to aid with weight distribution

The result was a 22.5 metres (74 ft) semi-displacement hull displacing 22 tons, which was wider at the front than the rear, creating a very efficient high-speed hydrodynamic shape. Three 370 kW (500 hp) Maybach VL II V12 engines would provide adequate power.

In Lürssen speed trials the new craft consistently reached a top speed of 63 km/h; 39 mph (34 kn), making it the fastest boat in its class in the world.

There is no basis for the common misconception that Oheka II was a "rum runner" used for smuggling.

== Schnellboot ==
In November 1929, Lürssen was given a contract to build a boat to the same basic design as Oheka II, but all metal with two torpedo tubes on the forecastle, and a slightly improved top speed. It became S-1, the Kriegsmarine's first Schnellboot and the basis for all the other S-Boats built during World War 2, known to the Allies as E-boats.

== See also ==
- Otto Hermann Kahn
- Oheka Castle
