= The Real Housewives of New York City season 11 =

The Real Housewives of New York City
- Season 11
- Cover used by the iTunes Store
- Starring: Bethenny Frankel; Luann de Lesseps; Ramona Singer; Sonja Morgan; Dorinda Medley; Tinsley Mortimer
- No. of episodes: 20

Release
- Original network: Bravo
- Original release: March 6 – July 25, 2019

Season chronology
- ← Previous; Season 10 Next → Season 12

The eleventh season of The Real Housewives of New York City, an American reality television series, was broadcast on Bravo. It premiered on March 6, 2019, and concluded on July 25, 2019. The series is primarily filmed in New York City. Its executive producers are Andrew Hoegl, Barrie Bernstein, Lisa Shannon, Pam Healy and Andy Cohen. The season focuses on the lives of Bethenny Frankel, Luann de Lesseps, Ramona Singer, Sonja Morgan, Dorinda Medley and Tinsley Mortimer.

This season marked the final appearance of original housewife Bethenny Frankel as she exited the show for a second time.

== Cast and synopsis ==
Following completion of production on the tenth season, Carole Radziwill announced her departure from the series. In September 2018, Us Weekly reported that Barbara Kavovit would join the franchise; Kavovit was previously heard during the seventh episode of the ninth season in an exchange with Radziwill. In an interview with the publication, Kavovit is an author, businesswoman and works in construction. She also has a degree in finance.

The eleventh season was announced to premiere on March 6, 2019, with all of the six remaining season ten housewives returning for the new installment; the season features the return of Zarin in a guest capacity and introduces Kavovit as a friend of the housewives.

== Episodes ==
The Real Housewives of New York City season 11 episodes
No. overall	No. in season	Title	Original release date	U.S. viewers (millions)
196	1	"Divided, They Summer"	March 6, 2019	1.54
The summer has been hectic for New York City housewives Bethenny and Luann. While Bethenny suffers and copes with the sudden passing of her boyfriend Dennis, Luann owns up to the fact she relapsed and had to be taken back to rehab and seeks a way to fix her life so her kids will not be ashamed of her. Meanwhile, at the Hamptons Ramona hires a good looking Russian swim coach to help her overcome her fear of water because she wants to finally learn how to swim so she can retire her pool nooddles. In the city Sonja is adjusting to her new apartment and finishing the decor. Dorinda has also hired a coach and has been running daily in an attempt to live a healthier lifestyle. She has yet to address the tension between her and Luann and fix the situation among them. They have not been on friendly terms since the incident at Luann's cabaret five months before when she heckled the Cabaret star by shouting "Jovani" during the performance. Tinsley gets a car from Scott and enjoys the NY weather.
197	2	"Things Are Going Southampton"	March 13, 2019	1.38
The tension hits the Hamptons with the arrival of the whole group to the local scene. Sonja is getting along with everyone but has a hard time conciliating the group that seems to have been split between the "blondes and the brunettes." Luann, Bethenny, and acquaintances discuss the night that Luann went back into rehab during a dinner date. At a different dinner, Tinsley and Dorinda watch Ramona's laughable attempts to score with the local guys. Barbara, a friend of Luann, throws a clambake and tries to bring the ladies together to settle their scores but things worsen since Luann has heard that Ramona has been gossiping about her nonstop and telling people that Luann has been thrown out of Chris Burch's party.
198	3	"It's a Clam Shame"	March 20, 2019	1.27
Still at Barbara's clambake, Ramona, who showed up uninvited, is confronted by Luann for spreading gossip. Luann and Bethenny jump in the pool still wearing clothes. Ramona tries to save face by leaving early but not before placing a lot of lobsters in a bag to bring back home. Her departure is even ruder than the way she acted towards the host - she did not stay any longer than 20 minutes at the clambake. Back in the city, Dorinda and Barbara have a heart to heart because Barbara never invited her to the clambake because of the status of her relationship with Luann. Barbara explains that she is doing her best to protect and help Luann who is still in a delicate situation. Bethenny continues her relief work after Hurricane Florence flooding devastated South Carolina and flies to the location to help. Sonja throws a party to celebrate the release of her photo spread for Paper Magazine. At the party, Dorinda and Luann finally speak even though it's a quick exchange of words.
199	4	"Making Up Is Hard to Do"	March 27, 2019	1.27
Bethenny tries helping Dorinda and Luann make amends by throwing a lunch sit-down for the two to discuss their issues with some "referees" at the table. Days pass and Luann begins her court-ordered community service and reveals details about her first meeting with her parole officer. Tinsley is visited by her mom Dale who pressures Tinsley to figure out what's the deal with her relationship with Scott. Meanwhile Ramona goes on a blind date with an eccentric type and Barbara is shown the door by an impatient Dorinda.
200	5	"Shark Bait"	April 3, 2019	1.35
Tinsley hosts a doggy fashion show in an attempt to find her way back into the charity world of New York City. Right after the show the ladies reunite aboard a yacht to have brunch. During brunch Tinsley is treated rudely by the women who grill her nonstop about her future with Scott and throw at her face that time is running out and her biological clock is ticking. Bethenny speaks with a grief counselor about coping with Dennis' death. Days later Dorinda prepares her mansion at the Berksires - the Blue Stone Manor - to receive the ladies for their first Halloween there. At dinner at a hotel restaurant at the Berkshires Luann throws tantrums because she does not want to sleep in the fish room while Bethenny, who is not even there yet, has a better room reserved for her.
201	6	"Sleeping With the Fishes"	April 10, 2019	1.39
Sonja loses her cool when Dorinda touches old Morgan family letters with her bear hands during a trip to an old Morgan family mansion. Luann's dissatisfaction seems to be contagious since now it's Barbara who gets unhappy with her room allocation at Dorinda's. Bethenny arrives and has to catch up with all the drama. Dinner is served by Adrian De Berardinis, the Bear-Naked Chef, and the ladies have a good time that is briefly interrupted by Sonja's drunken protests about the fact one cannot just touch the Morgan family letters.
202	7	"It's Kind of a Phone-y Story"	April 17, 2019	1.17
203	8	"Birds, Broads and Breakups"	April 24, 2019	1.16
204	9	"Tears of a Clown"	May 1, 2019	1.13
205	10	"Shalloween"	May 8, 2019	1.12
206	11	"Upstate Girls"	May 15, 2019	1.30
207	12	"Luann Land"	May 22, 2019	1.22
208	13	"It's Not You, It's Miami"	May 29, 2019	1.35
209	14	"Caught Between an Ex and a Hard Place"	June 5, 2019	1.36
210	15	"Life Is Not a Cabaret"	June 12, 2019	1.43
211	16	"More than a Feelin'"	June 20, 2019	1.38
212	17	"Jesus, the Countess and Joseph"	June 27, 2019	1.27
213	18	"Reunion Part 1"	July 11, 2019	1.29
214	19	"Reunion Part 2"	July 18, 2019	1.09
215	20	"Reunion Part 3"	July 25, 2019	1.21
