= Maybach VL II =

1920s German airship engine

VL II
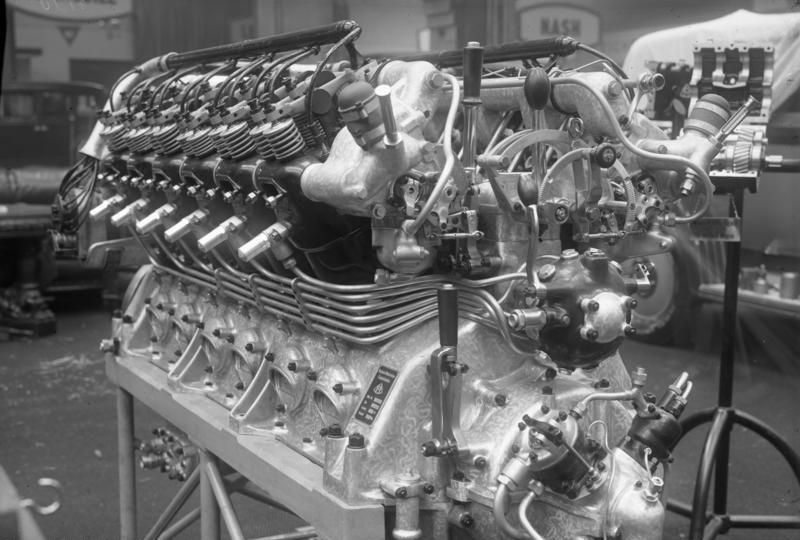
- Type: V12 liquid-cooled 4-stroke piston engine (Otto)
- National origin: Germany
- Manufacturer: Maybach
- Major applications: Graf Zeppelin, USS Akron, USS Macon
- Number built: at least 24
- Developed from: Maybach VL I

The Maybach VL II was an engine for marine and airship use built by the German company Maybach in the late 1920s and 1930s. It was an uprated development of the successful Maybach VL I, and like the VL I, was a 60° V12 engine.

== History ==
Five of them powered the German airship Graf Zeppelin, housed in separate nacelles. The engines developed 410 kW (550 hp) and were of 33.251 L (2,029.1 cu in) capacity. They could burn either Blau gas or petrol. The American USS Akron used eight of them, mounted internally, as did its sister ship Macon. The engines were reversible, meaning different cams could be engaged allowing the engine crankshaft to run in either direction, enabling reverse thrust.

Lürssen built the fast yacht Oheka II in 1927; powered by three VL IIs, it was the fastest vessel of its type and became the basis of Germany's E-boats of World War II.

== Applications ==
- LZ 127 Graf Zeppelin
- USS Akron (ZRS-4)
- USS Macon (ZRS-5)
- Oheka II

== Specifications ==
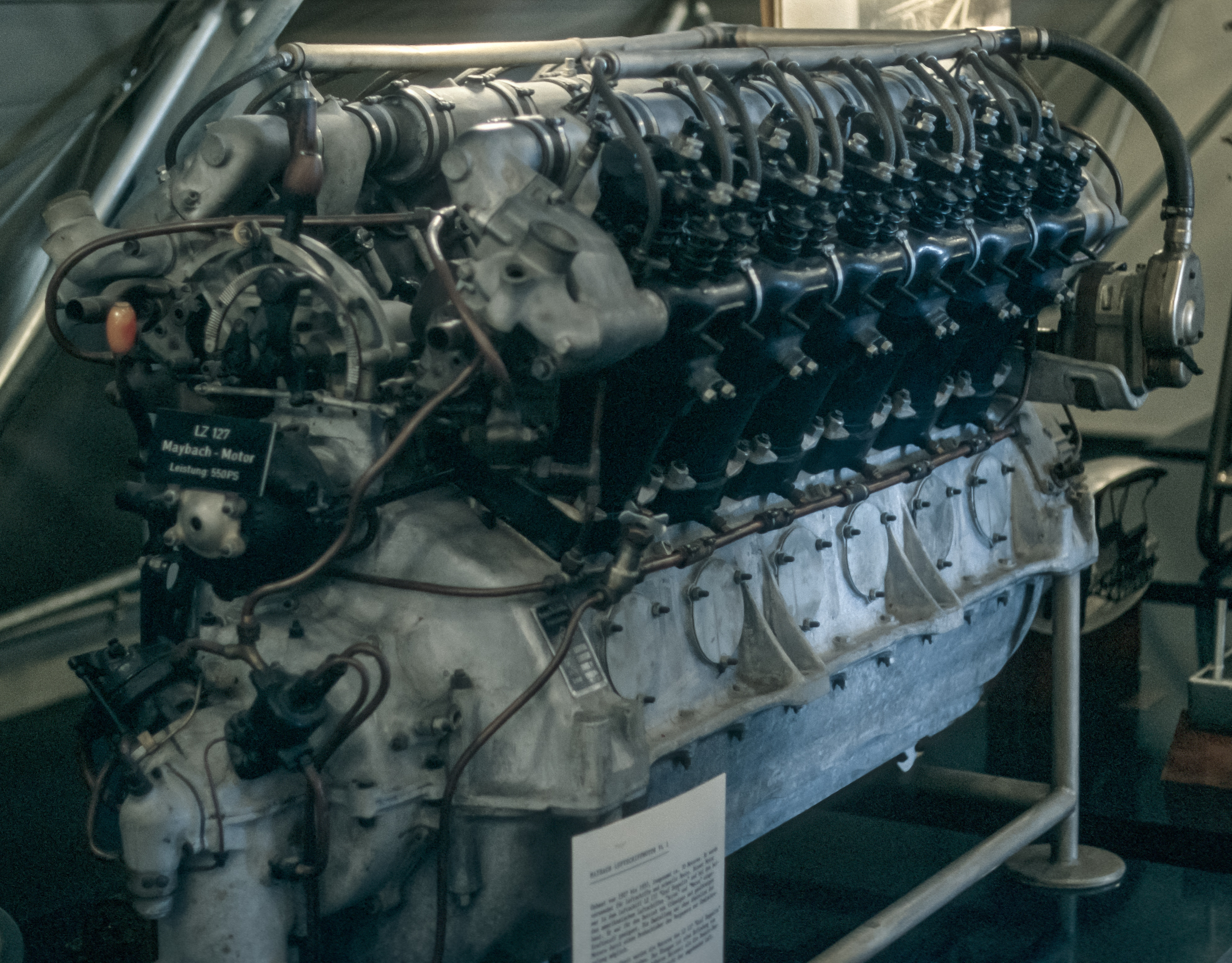
VL II engine on display at the Zeppelin-Museum Meersburg

Data from National Air and Space Museum

=== General characteristics ===
- Type: V12 four-stroke liquid-cooled piston engine
- Bore: 140 mm (5.5 in)
- Stroke: 180 mm (7.1 in)
- Displacement: 33,300 cm^{3} (2,030 cu in)
- Length: 195.6 cm (77.0 in)
- Width: 91.4 cm (36.0 in)
- Height: 96.5 cm (38.0 in)
- Dry weight: 809.2 kg (1,784 lb)

=== Components ===
- Cooling system: Liquid-cooled

=== Performance ===
- Power output: 430 kW (570 hp) at 1,600 rpm

== See also ==
Related development

- Maybach VL I

Related lists

- List of aircraft engines
