= Eugene J. Kahn =

Eugene J. Kahn was an American stockbroker associated with the exchange firm Parrish & Co.

== Early life ==
Kahn was born in Frankfurt, Germany. His siblings included brothers Arthur, Rudolph and Walter. He was a cousin of investment banker Otto Hermann Kahn.

== Career ==
Kahn built a banking business in Paris before he came to New York in 1923. He was associated with several Wall Street firms in the United States: Morgan Livermore & Co during 1926; Shuman & Co beginning in 1929; and Parrish & Co until his death.

== Personal life ==
A resident of Bedford Village, New York, Kahn died in 1936 at Park East Hospital in Manhattan.

== See also ==
- New York Stock Exchange
