= The Real Housewives of New York City season 12 =

Television season

The Real Housewives of New York City
- Season 12
- Cover used by the iTunes Store
- Starring: Luann de Lesseps; Ramona Singer; Sonja Morgan; Dorinda Medley; Tinsley Mortimer; Leah McSweeney
- No. of episodes: 25

Release
- Original network: Bravo
- Original release: April 2 – October 1, 2020

Season chronology
- ← Previous; Season 11 Next → Season 13

The twelfth season of The Real Housewives of New York City, an American reality television series, is broadcast on Bravo. It premiered on April 2, 2020. The series is primarily filmed in New York City. Its executive producers are Lisa Shannon, Barrie Bernstein, Darren Ward, John Paparazzo and Andy Cohen. The season focuses on the lives of Luann de Lesseps, Ramona Singer, Sonja Morgan, Dorinda Medley, Tinsley Mortimer and Leah McSweeney.

This would mark the final season for both Tinsley Mortimer and Dorinda Medley.

== Cast and synopsis ==
Following the completion of production on the eleventh season, Bethenny Frankel announced her departure from the series.

The season also includes Elyse Slaine who appears in a recurring capacity. On June 11, 2020, Tinsley Mortimer announced her exit from the series midseason, following her decision to relocate to Chicago to be with fiancé Scott Kluth. Following the conclusion of the episode, the series went on a two-week hiatus, allowing editors additional time to edit episodes, due to the COVID-19 pandemic in the United States. On June 29 of the same year, it was announced that upon the season's return, new tag lines would be used, a first in the franchise's history.

In August 2020, Medley announced her departure from the series. That same month, the season's three-part reunion was filmed—in-person—on Long Island at the Oheka Castle, becoming the first Real Housewives reunion to be filmed face-to-face since the COVID-19 pandemic in the United States.

== Episodes ==
The Real Housewives of New York City season 12 episodes
| No. overall | No. in season | Title | Original release date | U.S. viewers (millions) |
|---|---|---|---|---|
| 216 | 1 | "Back in the NY Groove" | April 2, 2020 | 1.09 |
| 217 | 2 | "Stooping to a Lower Level" | April 9, 2020 | 1.03 |
| 218 | 3 | "Don't Mansion It" | April 16, 2020 | 1.17 |
| 219 | 4 | "Ain't No Party Like a Hamptons Party" | April 23, 2020 | 1.25 |
| 220 | 5 | "Not So Model Behavior" | April 30, 2020 | 1.22 |
| 221 | 6 | "Just the Sip" | May 7, 2020 | 1.18 |
| 222 | 7 | "How Ya Like Them Apples?" | May 14, 2020 | 1.27 |
| 223 | 8 | "If You Can't Take the Heat, Get Out of the Russian Bath House" | May 21, 2020 | 1.14 |
| 224 | 9 | "Hurricane Leah" | May 28, 2020 | 1.33 |
| 225 | 10 | "Something's Brewing" | June 4, 2020 | 1.18 |
| 226 | 11 | "Love Him and Leave Them" | June 11, 2020 | 1.18 |
| 227 | 12 | "Eat, Drink and Be Scary" | July 2, 2020 | 0.88 |
| 228 | 13 | "Not Feeling Jovani" | July 9, 2020 | 1.11 |
| 229 | 14 | "Remember Your Blue Stone Manners" | July 16, 2020 | 1.11 |
| 230 | 15 | "Sheer Madness" | July 23, 2020 | 1.12 |
| 231 | 16 | "Not Very Merry-achi" | July 30, 2020 | 1.18 |
| 232 | 17 | "Back on the Hump" | August 6, 2020 | 1.16 |
| 233 | 18 | "Hitting All the Wrong Cenotes" | August 13, 2020 | 1.22 |
| 234 | 19 | "21st Century Sonja" | August 20, 2020 | 1.06 |
| 235 | 20 | "No Party Like a Mob Party" | August 27, 2020 | 1.12 |
| 236 | 21 | "Viva la Dysfunction" | September 3, 2020 | 1.12 |
| 237 | 22 | "Reunion Part 1" | September 10, 2020 | 1.13 |
| 238 | 23 | "Reunion Part 2" | September 17, 2020 | 1.02 |
| 239 | 24 | "Reunion Part 3" | September 24, 2020 | 1.00 |
| 240 | 25 | "Secrets Revealed" | October 1, 2020 | 0.50 |
