= Maybach VL I =

VL I
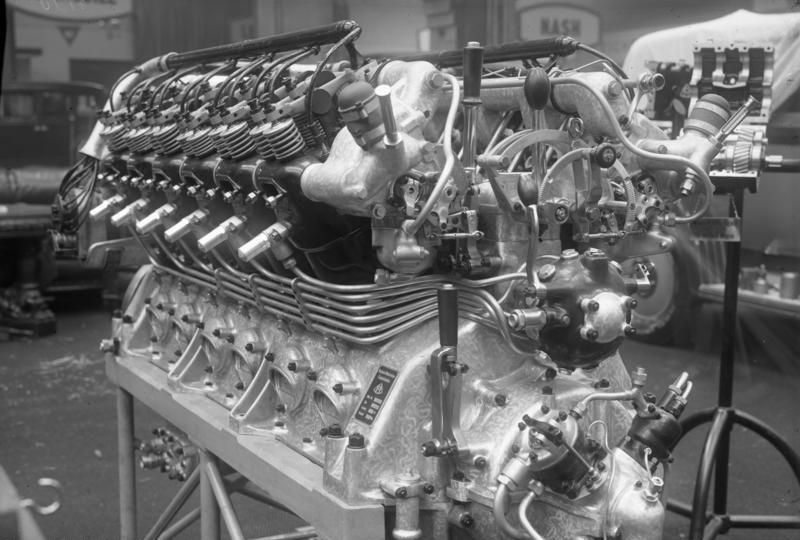
- Maybach VL II, a similar engine
- Type: V12 liquid-cooled 4-stroke piston engine (Otto)
- National origin: Germany
- Manufacturer: Maybach
- Major applications: USS Los Angeles (ZR-3) / LZ 126
- Manufactured: 1924
- Number built: at least five
- Developed from: Maybach Mb IVa
- Developed into: Maybach VL II

The Maybach VL I was an Otto cycle V12 engine, made from 1924 in Germany. The airship LZ 126 was powered by five VL I engines which emphasised reliability and low fuel consumption.

== Technical description ==
The VL I was a V12 liquid-cooled four-stroke Otto cycle, (commonly known as a 4-cycle) engine, with individual grey cast iron cylinders, with a cylinder bore of 140 mm (5.5 in), piston stroke of 180 mm (7.1 in), and displacement of 33.255 L (2,029.3 cu in). The crankshaft was supported in roller-bearings and was fitted with a vibration damper for smooth operation. The overhead valves, one large inlet valve and two smaller outlet valves per cylinder, were operated by a camshaft running between the cylinder banks, operating the valves with tappets, pushrods and rocker arms.

The majority of the ancillary equipment was run by the camshaft to reduce vibration. Fuel was mixed with air by two fireproof Maybach carburetors per cylinder bank, with two header tanks above the carburetors providing fuel. Compressed air was used to start the engine; two tanks with a volume of 25 m^{3} (880 cu ft) at 29 bar (420 psi) supplied compressed air directly to each cylinder to start the engine.

To change the direction of rotation of the crankshaft, the camshaft, with lobes for normal or reverse operation, could be moved by compressed air to change over the cams in use. This mechanism, used to decelerate and halt aircraft, was operated by an engineer, accommodated in the engine nacelles, with levers.

== Specifications ==
Data from

=== General characteristics ===
- Type: V12 4-stroke liquid-cooled piston engine (Otto)
- Bore: 140 mm (5.5 in)
- Stroke: 180 mm (7.1 in)
- Displacement: 33,255 cm^{3} (2,029.3 cu in)

=== Components ===
- Valvetrain: pushrod operated overhead valves: 1 × inlet, 2 × exhaust with reversible rotation cams
- Fuel system: 2 × carburetors per cylinder bank
- Oil system: pressure feed
- Cooling system: liquid-cooled

=== Performance ===
- Power output: 420 PS (310 kW)
- Compression ratio: 5.8:1
- Specific fuel consumption: 258.3 g/kWh
