= Barbara Kavovit =

American author, businesswoman, and reality television personality

- Other name: Barbara K
- Education: State University of New York at Oswego
- Occupations: Reality television personality; author; businesswoman
- Years active: 2005 - present
- Known for: The Real Housewives of New York City
- Notable work: Heels of Steel
- Political party: Democrat
- Website: barbarakformayor.com evergreenconstructioncorp.com

Barbara Kavovit, colloquially known as Barbara K, is an American author, businesswoman, former political candidate, and reality television personality who appeared on The Real Housewives of New York City. She is the author of two nonfiction books, followed by the fictional semi-autobiographical Heels of Steel. She announced her candidacy for the 2021 New York City Democratic mayoral primary in January 2021, eventually dropping out in June that same year.

== Early life and education ==
Kavovit was raised by her history teacher mother and her father, mechanical engineer Joseph Kavovit (d. 2013), in The Bronx, New York, United States. She has a sister named Caryn Kavovit. She attended State University of New York at Oswego, where she majored in economics and finance and graduated with her Bachelor's degree in 1987.

== Career ==
=== Books ===
Kavovit is the author of three books, including the nonfiction books Room For Improvement (2005) and Invest in Your Nest (2006), and the fiction novel Heels of Steel (2019). The synopsis for Heels of Steel reads:

Heels of Steel follows the journey of Bridget Steele, the Bronx-born, tough-as-nails and sexy construction company CEO, who is determined to be the first woman to get a contract to build a New York City skyscraper. Fighting for her life and career in the male dominated world of the Big Apple’s real estate industry, Steele also finds herself falling for her biggest rival, who could impede her rise to the top. In this summer’s hottest beach read, Kavovit gives readers a look into the cut-throat business of hardhats and hammers, delving into the sexism, corruption, harassment and how far people will go to land a contract."

The release party for Heels of Steel was held at the PHD Terrace at Dream Midtown in June 2019. Hasty Book List reviewed the book and wrote, "Who run the world? Girls! I love me a great story with a strong female lead who is shattering glass ceilings and proving themselves in "a man's world" while remaining true to who they are. I also really freaking love this book cover. PLUS, this book is semi-autobiographical." Writing for the Toronto Star, Sue Carter wrote, "The rags-to-riches Heels of Steel scores all the beach-read checkboxes: sex, fashion, deceit, Hamptons parties, nasty rich villains and a tough-spirited heroine." Writing for Swaay, Iman Oubou wrote the novel "addresses sexism in the construction industry." Sarah Slusher from Really Into This stated, "Do I want to read a debut novel by the newest member of Bravo’s Real Housewives of New York? You bet your ass I do!"

=== Construction work ===
Kavovit is the CEO of Evergreen Construction, a business she founded in 2015. In 2020, the company was contracted to re-do Harvey Weinstein's former New York City offices, which got attention because Evergreen Construction is female led. For that project, she used female tradespeople and a female project manager, which she included as part of her pitch to get the project. She uses construction tools from the line DIYVA, a tools and kits line marketed to women that she created.

=== Television ===
Kavovit appeared on the reality television show The Real Housewives of New York City as a guest on seasons 3, 4, 5, 6, 8, and 9, then as a friend of Luann de Lesseps for season 11; de Lesseps claimed "Barbara was one of the few people who was there for her during her road to sobriety." The two initially met on a playground. Shannon Raphael of Distractify wrote Kavovit was "Luann's support system". The two subsequently had a falling out and Kavovit did not return in season 12. Screen Rant writer Sabrina Constabile wrote Kavovit "did not mesh well with many of her cast members" while on the show.

Appearances on RHONY
Seasons
1	2	3	4	5	6	7	8	9	10	11	12	13
		Guest					Guest			Friend		

After not coming back for RHONY season 12, Kavovit tweeted a "teaser" in November 2019 that she was pitching her own show when she replied to a fan, "No love- fingers crossed pitching my own show – stay tuned!"

=== Politics ===
Barbara Kavovit
(@msbarbarak)
tweeted:

I really do care. I really do believe in #NewYorkCity. There's no place I'd rather be. There's no place I'll ever live. I want to see the shining, modern city with opportunity for all that I know it can be.

March 13, 2021

In January 2021, Kavovit announced via Instagram she was running to become the next New York City mayor with Bill DeBlasio's term ending in the 2021 New York City mayoral election. Kavovit stated, "I may not be a politician, but I'm a Bronx-born New Yorker who isn't fearful of the hard work and tough decisions that lay ahead." Her campaign slogan was "It will take a builder to rebuild New York City and I'm the woman to do it." She stated she had been considering the run for more than a year.

The Brooklyn Reader reported "Kavovit said now was not the time to defund the police. Restoring trust and confidence in the NYPD would be one of her priorities as mayor. She said she wanted to see more community policing and less law enforcement involvement in cases dealing with mental illness and homelessness." Kavovit has proposed turning Rikers Island, the city's main jail complex, into a "colony for the city's homeless." Curbed writer Caroline Spivak criticized the proposal, stating it "sounds uncomfortably like an internment camp" and is "a profoundly bad idea."

In March 2021, Kavovit joined Decision NYC with Ben Max to discuss her candidacy and goals. By March 17, Kavovit had raised $15,320, which City & State New York characterized as "anemic" compared to Eric Adams' $7.6 million and Scott Stringer's $6.85 million. Reality television personalities Carla Facciolo (Mob Wives) and Margaret Josephs (The Real Housewives of New Jersey) both supported the campaign.

In early June 2021, Kavovit announced she was dropping out of the race. She went on to endorse Kathryn Garcia. Garcia went on to lose by 0.8 percentage points to Eric Adams for the Democratic primary.

== Personal life ==
Kavovit lives on the Upper East Side of Manhattan. She was previously married to a man who also worked as a contractor. She has a son.

=== Finances ===
In 2006, Kavovit and her father took out a loan for $2.6 million to purchase a $7 million mansion in Wainscott. Kavovit filed for personal bankruptcy in 2015. As of August 2020 she was in settlement discussions with Deutsche Bank.
