= List of television programs: A =

Alphabetically indexed lists of television programs
0–9	A	B	C	D	E	F	G	H	I–J
K–L	M	N	O	P	Q–R	S	T	U–V–W	X–Y–Z

This is an alphabetical list of television program articles (or sections within articles about television programs). Spaces and special characters are ignored. This list covers television programs whose first letter (excluding "a" or "the") of the title is A.

== A ==
=== A ===
- A3 (Brazil)
- A for Andromeda (1961) (UK)
- A-List Listings
- The A List (2018–2021) (UK)
- The A-List (2007–2008)
- The A-List: Dallas (2011)
- The A-List: New York (2010–2011)
- The A-Team (1983–1987)
- The A Word (2016-2020) (UK)
- A to Z (2014–2015)

=== AA ===
- Aaagh! It's the Mr. Hell Show! (2001–2002) (UK)
- Aaahh!!! Real Monsters (1994–1997)
- Aaron Hernandez: An ID Murder Mystery
- Aaron Stone (2009–2010)
- Aaron's Way (1988)
- Aarti Party (2010–2011)

=== AB ===
- Abadas (2011–2012) (Philippines)
- The Abandons (2025)
- The Abbott and Costello Show (1952–1957)
- Abbott Elementary (2021–present)
- Abby Hatcher (2019–2022)
- Abby's (2019)
- Abby's Studio Rescue
- Abby's Ultimate Dance Competition (2012–2013)
- ABC Afternoon Playbreak (1972–1975)
- ABC Afterschool Special (1972–1997)
- ABC Comedy Hour (1956)
- ABC Comedy Hour (1972)
- ABC Galaxy (2006–present)
- ABC In Concert Country (1994)
- ABC Saturday Superstar Movie (1972–1973)
- ABC Sunday Night Movie (1962–1998)
- ABC Weekend Specials (1977–1996)
- ABC Wide World of Entertainment (1972–1982)
- ABC World News Tonight (1978–present)
- A Bit of Fry & Laurie (1987–1995) (UK)
- Abominable and the Invisible City (2022–2023)
- About a Boy (2014–2015)
- About a Girl (2007–2008) (Canada)
- About Anglia (1960–1990)
- About Face (1989–1991) (UK)
- Above Suspicion (2009–2012) (UK)
- Above the Law (2000) (Australia)
- Abracadavers (2019–present) (Canada)
- Absentia (2017–2020)
- Absolute Power (2003–2005) (UK)
- Absolutely Fabulous (1992–2012) (UK)
- A Bunch of Munsch (1991–1992)

=== AC ===
- Acapulco (1961)
- Acapulco (2021–2025)
- Acapulco H.E.A.T. (1993–1999)
- Acapulco Shore (2014–2022) (Mexico)
- Accel World (2012)
- Acceptable Risk (2017) (Ireland)
- Acceptable.TV (2007)
- Access Hollywood (1996–present)
- Accidental Family (1967–1968)
- The Accidental Wolf (2020–2022)
- Accidentally on Purpose (2009–2010)
- According to Bex (2005) (UK)
- According to Jim (2001–2009)
- Accused (2010) (UK)
- Accused (2023–2024) (US)
- Accused: Guilty or Innocent
- Ace Crawford, Private Eye (1983)
- Ace Lightning (2002–2005) (UK)
- Ace of Cakes (2006–2011)
- Ace of Wands (1970–1972) (UK)
- Ace Ventura: Pet Detective (1995–2000)
- Acme Hour (1995)
- The Acolyte (2024)
- Acquitted (2015–2016) (Norway)
- The Act (2019)
- Acting Good (2022–present) (Canada)
- Action (1999–2000)
- Action League Now! (1995–2002)
- Active Kidz (2014)
- Action Man (1995–1996)
- Action Man (2000–2001)
- Action Pack (2022)
- An Actor's Life for Me (1991) (UK)
- Actors Studio (1948–1950)
- Actress (2023) (Turkey)

=== AD ===
- Ada Twist, Scientist (2021–2023)
- Adam-12 (1968–1975)
- Adam-12 (1990–1991)
- The Adam & Joe Show (1996–2001) (UK)
- Adam Adamant Lives! (1966–1967) (UK)
- Adam and Joe Go Tokyo (2003) (UK)
- The Adam Carolla Project (2005–2009)
- Adam Ruins Everything (2015–2019)
- Adams of Eagle Lake (1975)
- Adam's Rib (1973)
- Adamas (2022) (South Korea)
- The Addams Family (1964–1966)
- The Addams Family (1973)
- The Addams Family (1992–1993)
- The Addams Family (1998–1999)
- Adderly (1986–1988) (Canada)
- Addicted to Beauty (2009)
- Addicted to Food
- Adolescence (2025) (UK)
- Adoption Diaries
- Adults (2025–present)
- Adventure at Scott Island (1957–1958)
- Adventure Beast (2021)
- Adventure Inc. (2002–2003)
- Adventure Time (2010–2018)
- Adventure Time: Distant Lands (2020–2021)
- Adventure Time: Fionna and Cake (2023–present)
- Adventure Time: Side Quests (2026–present)
- Adventures in Odyssey (1987–present)
- Adventures in Paradise (1959–1962)
- Adventures in Wonderland (1992–1993)
- The Adventures of Abney & Teal (2011–2012) (UK)
- The Adventures of Batman (1968–1969)
- The Adventures of Batman and Robin (1992–1995)
- The Adventures of Black Beauty (1972–1974) (UK)
- The Adventures of the Black Stallion (1990–1993)
- The Adventures of Boston Blackie (1951–1952)
- The Adventures of Bottle Top Bill and His Best Friend Corky (2005–2009) (Australia)
- The Adventures of Brisco County, Jr. (1993–1994)
- The Adventures of Champion (1955–1956)
- The Adventures of Chico and Guapo (2006)
- The Adventures of Chuck and Friends (2010–2012)
- The Adventures of Colonel Flack (1953–1959)
- The Adventures of Don Coyote and Sancho Panda (1990–1991)
- The Adventures of Don Quick (1970) (UK)
- The Adventures of Dr. Fu Manchu (1956)
- The Adventures of Ellery Queen (1950–1952)
- The Adventures of the Falcon (1954–1955)
- The Adventures of the Galaxy Rangers (1986)
- The Adventures of Gulliver (1968–1969)
- The Adventures of the Gummi Bears (1985–1991)
- The Adventures of Hiram Holliday (1956–1957)
- The Adventures of Hyperman (1995–1996)
- The Adventures of Jim Bowie (1956–1958)
- The Adventures of Jimmy Neutron: Boy Genius (2002–2006)
- The Adventures of Jonny Quest (1964)
- The Adventures of Kid Danger (2018)
- The Adventures of Kit Carson (1951–1956)
- The Adventures of Mark & Brian (1991-1992)
- The Adventures of Mary-Kate & Ashley (1994–1997)
- The Adventures of McGraw (1957–1959)
- The Adventures of Merlin (2008–2012) (UK)
- The Adventures of Napkin Man! (2013–2017)
- The Adventures of Ozzie and Harriet (1952–1966)
- The Adventures of Paddington Bear (1997–2000) (Canada)
- The Adventures of Paddy the Pelican (1950)
- The Adventures of Pete & Pete (1991–1996)
- The Adventures of Portland Bill (1983–1986) (UK)
- The Adventures of Puss in Boots (2015–2018)
- The Adventures of Rin Tin Tin (1954–1956)
- The Adventures of Robin Hood (1955–1959) (UK)
- The Adventures of Rocky and Bullwinkle (1959–1964)
- The Adventures of Sam & Max: Freelance Police (1997–1998)
- The Adventures of the Scarlet Pimpernel (1955–1956) (UK)
- The Adventures of Sherlock Holmes (1984–1994) (UK)
- The Adventures of Shirley Holmes (1997–2000) (UK) (Canada)
- The Adventures of Sinbad (1996–1998)
- The Adventures of Sir Francis Drake (1961–1962)
- The Adventures of Sir Lancelot (1956–1957)
- The Adventures of Sir Prancelot (1972)
- The Adventures of Skippy (1968–1970)
- The Adventures of Sonic the Hedgehog (1993)
- The Adventures of Spin and Marty (1955–1957)
- The Adventures of Super Mario Bros. 3 (1990)
- The Adventures of Superboy (1966–1968)
- The Adventures of Superman (1952–1958)
- The Adventures of Swiss Family Robinson (1998)
- The Adventures of Teddy Ruxpin (1986–1987)
- The Adventures of Tintin (1991–1992) (France)
- The Adventures of Twizzle (1957–1959) (UK)
- The Adventures of Wild Bill Hickok (1951–1958)
- The Adventures of William Tell (1958–1959)

=== AE ===
- Æon Flux (1991–1995)
- A.E.S. Hudson Street (1977–1978)

=== AF ===
- The Affair (2014–2019)
- Affairs of the Heart (1983–1985)
- Africa (2013) (UK)
- African Skies (1992–1994) (Canada)
- Afro Samurai (2007)
- After Baywatch: Moment in the Sun (1989–2001)
- After Dark (1987–2003)
- After Henry (1988–1992) (UK)
- After Lately (2011–2013)
- After Life (2019–2022) (UK)
- After Midnight (2024–2025)
- After Paradise (2015–2016)
- After School Dice Club (2019)
- After the First 48 (2004)
- After the Flood (2024) (UK)
- After the Party (2023) (New Zealand)
- After the Thrones (2016)
- After the Verdict (2022) (Australia)
- After You've Gone (2007–2008) (UK)
- Afterlife (2005–2006) (UK)
- AfterMASH (1983–1985)
- Aftermath (2014)
- Aftermath with William Shatner (2010–2011)
- Afternoon Live (2017–2019) (UK)
- The Afternoon Show (1987–1993) (Australia)
- The Afternoon Show (2004–2010) (Ireland)
- The Afterparty (2022–2023)
- Aftertaste (2021–2022) (Australia)

=== AG ===
- Against the Grain (1993)
- Against the Law (1990–1991)
- Against the Wall (2011)
- Agatha All Along (2024)
- The Agatha Christie Hour (1982) (UK)
- Agatha Christie: Lucy Worsley on the Mystery Queen (2023–present) (UK)
- Agatha Christie's Hjerson (2021) (Sweden)
- Agatha Christie's Marple (2004–2013) (UK)
- Agatha Christie's Partners in Crime (1983–1984) (UK)
- Agatha Christie's Poirot (1989–2013) (UK)
- Agatha Christie's Seven Dials (2026) (UK)
- Agatha Raisin (2014–2023) (UK)
- Age of the Living Dead (2018–2022)
- The Agency (2001–2003)
- The Agency (2007)
- The Agency (2024–present)
- Agent Binky: Pets of the Universe (2019–2024) (Canada)
- Agent Carter (2015–2016)
- Agent Elvis (2023)
- Agent X (2015)
- Agents of Mystery (2024–present) (South Korea)
- Age of Love (2007)
- Água de Mar (2014) (Portugal)
- Agents of S.H.I.E.L.D. (2013–2020)
- Agents of S.M.A.S.H. (2013–2015)
- Agony (1979–1981) (UK)
- Agony Again (1995) (UK)

=== AI ===
- Ainsley McGregor Mysteries (2024–present)
- Ain't That America (2013–2014)
- Air America (1998–1999)
- Air Disasters (2003–present) (Canada)
- Air Power (1956–1957)
- Airline (1982) (UK)
- Airline (1998–2007) (UK)
- Airline (2004–2005)
- Airplane Repo (2010–2015)
- Airwolf (1984–1987)

=== AK ===
- A.K.A Pablo (1984)
- Akame ga Kill! (2014)
- Äkta Människor (2012–2014) (Sweden)
- Akudama Drive (2020)
- Akumaizer 3 (1975–1976)

=== AL ===
- Al Murray's Happy Hour (2007–2008) (UK)
- Al Murray's Multiple Personality Disorder (2009) (UK)
- Aladdin (1994–1995)
- Alan Bennett's Talking Heads (2020) (UK)
- Alan Carr: Chatty Man (2009–2017) (UK)
- Alan Carr's Celebrity Ding Dong (2008) (UK)
- Alan Davies: As Yet Unititled (2014–2023) (UK)
- Alan Davies' Teenage Revolution (2012) (UK)
- Alan Partridge's Mid Morning Matters (2012) (UK)
- Alarm for Cobra 11 (1996–2022) (Germany)
- The Alan Young Show (1950–1953)
- Alas Smith & Jones (1984–1998) (UK)
- Alaska Daily (2022–2023)
- The Alaska Experiment (2008–2011)
- Alaska Gold Diggers (2013–2014)
- Alaska PD (2020)
- Alaska State Troopers (2009–2018)
- Alaska: the Last Frontier (2011–2022)
- Alaska Wing Men (2011–2012)
- Alaskan Bush People (2014–2022)
- The Alaskans (1959–1960)
- Albert and Victoria (1970–1971)
- Alcatraz (2012)
- Alchemy of Souls (2022–2023) (South Korea)
- Alcoa Premiere (1961–1963)
- Alcoa Presents: One Step Beyond (1959–1961)
- Alcock and Gander (1972)
- The Alec Baldwin Show (2018)
- The Alectrix (2013)
- Alert: Missing Persons Unit (2023–2025)
- Alex Haley's Queen (1993)
- Alex, Inc. (2018)
- Alex Rider (2020–2024) (UK)
- Alexa & Katie (2018–2020)
- Alexander (1999)
- Alexander: The Making of a God (2024)
- ALF (1986–1990)
- ALF Tales (1988–1989)
- ALF: The Animated Series (1987–1989)
- The Alfred Hitchcock Hour (1955)
- Alfred Hitchcock Presents (1955–1965)
- Alfred Hitchcock Presents (1985)
- Alfred J. Kwak (1989–1992) (Netherlands) (Japan)
- Alfresco (1983–1984) (UK)
- ALF's Hit Talk Show (2004)
- Ali G: Rezurection (2014)
- Algiers, America
- Alias (2001–2006)
- Alias Grace (2017) (Canada)
- Alias Smith and Jones (1971–1973)
- Alice (1976–1985)
- Alice (2009) (Canada)
- Alice & Jack (2024) (UK)
- Alice and Steve (2026–present) (UK)
- Alice, I Think (2006) (Canada)
- Alice in Borderland (2020–2025) (Japan)
- Alice's Wonderland Bakery (2022–2024)
- Alien Dawn (2013–2014)
- Alien: Earth (2025–present)
- Alien Nation (1989–1990)
- Alien News Desk (2019)
- Alien Racers (2005–2006)
- Alien Surf Girls (2012) (Australia)
- Alien Worlds (2020) (UK)
- Alienated (2003–2004)
- Alienators: Evolution Continues (2001–2002)
- The Alienist (2018–2020)
- The Aliens (2016) (UK)
- Aliens in America (2007–2008)
- Aliens in the Family (1996)
- All About Faces (1971–1972)
- All About George (2005) (UK)
- All About Me (2002–2004) (UK)
- All About Us (2001)
- All About the Andersons (2003–2004)
- All About the Washingtons (2018)
- All Along the Watchtower (1999) (UK)
- All American (2018–present)
- All-American Girl (1994–1995)
- All American: Homecoming (2022–2024)
- All-American Muslim (2011–2012)
- All at No. 20 (1986–1987) (UK)
- All Creatures Great and Small (1978–1990) (UK)
- All Creatures Great and Small (2020–present) (UK)
- All Dogs Go to Heaven: The Series (1996–1998)
- Allegra's Window (1994–1996)
- All Elite Wrestling: Dynamite (2019–present)
- All Gas and Gaiters (1967–1971) (UK)
- All Grown Up! (2003–2008)
- All Hail King Julien (2014–2017)
- All Her Fault (2025)
- All in Good Faith (1985–1988) (UK)
- All in the Family (1971–1979)
- All Is Forgiven (1986)
- All My Children (1970–2013)
- The All New Alexei Sayle Show (1994–1995) (UK)
- The All New Harry Hill Show (1997–2000) (UK)
- The All New Mickey Mouse Club (1989–1996)
- The All New Popeye Hour (1978–1981)
- The All New Pound Puppies (1986–1987)
- The All New Super Friends Hour (1977–1978)
- All Night (2018)
- All Night Long (1994) (UK)
- All of Us (2003–2007)
- All of Us Are Dead (2022–present) (South Korea)
- All on the Line (2011–2012)
- All or Nothing (2016–2020)
- All Our Saturdays (1973–1976) (UK)
- All Quiet on the Preston Front (1994–1997) (UK)
- All Rise (2019–2023)
- All Round to Mrs. Brown's (2017–2020) (UK)
- All Saints (1998–2009) (Australia)
- All Souls (2001)
- All the Small Things (2009) (UK)
- All Star K! (2002–2009) (Philippines)
- All That (1994–2020)
- All That Glitters (1977) (US)
- All That Glitters (2023) (Signapore)
- All The Light We Cannot See (2023)
- All the Queen's Men (2021–present)
- All the Right Moves (2012)
- All the Small Things (2009) (UK)
- All You Can Eat
- All You Need is Love: The Story of Popular Music (1977) (UK)
- Allegiance (2015)
- Allegiance (2024–present) (Canada)
- Allen Gregory (2011)
- Allen v. Farrow (2021)
- The Alleyn Mysteries (1990–1994)
- 'Allo 'Allo! (1982–1992) (UK)
- All's Fair (1976–1977)
- All's Fair (2025–present)
- Ally McBeal (1997–2002)
- Alma's Not Normal (2020–2024) (UK)
- Alma's Way (2021–present)
- The Almighty Johnsons (2011–2013) (New Zealand)
- Almost Family (2019–2020)
- Almost Genius (2015–2016)
- Almost Grown (1988–1989)
- Almost Heroes (2011) (Canada)
- Almost Home (1991–1993)
- Almost Human (2013–2014)
- Almost Live! (1984–1999)
- Almost Naked Animals (2011–2013) (Canada)
- Almost Never (2019–2021) (UK)
- Almost Paradise (2020–2023)
- Almost Perfect (1995–1997)
- Almost Royal (2014–2016) (UK) (US)
- Aloha Paradise (1981)
- Alone (2015)
- Alone Together (2018)
- Alone: Frozen (2022)
- Along for the Ride with David O'Doherty (2021) (UK)
- Alphabetical (2016–2017) (UK)
- Alphablocks (2010–2025) (UK)
- Alpha Scorpio (1974) (Australia)
- Alphas (2011–2012)
- Alright Already (1997–1998)
- Älska mig (2019–2020) (Sweden)
- AlRawabi School for Girls (2021–2024) (Jordan)
- Alter Ego (2021)
- Altered Carbon (2018–2020)
- Alvin and the Chipmunks (1983–1990)
- Alvin and the Chipmunks (2015–2023)
- The Alvin Show (1961–1962)
- Always a Witch (2019–2020) (Columbia)
- Always Greener (2001–2003) (Australia)
- The Alzheimer's Project (2009)

=== AM ===
- AM Chicago (1975–1986)
- Am I Being Unreasonable? (2022) (UK)
- Amadeus (2025) (UK)
- Amandaland (2025) (UK)
- Amanda's (1983)
- The Amanda Show (1999–2002)
- The Amazing Chan and the Chan Clan (1972)
- The Amazing Digital Circus (2023–2026) (Australia)
- Amazing Extraordinary Friends (2007–2011) (New Zealand)
- Amazing Grace (1995)
- Amazing Grace (2021) (Australia)
- The Amazing Live Sea-Monkeys (1992)
- The Amazing Race
  - The Amazing Race America (2001–present)
  - The Amazing Race Asia (2006–2016)
  - The Amazing Race Australia (2011–2014; 2019–present)
  - The Amazing Race Canada (2013–present)
- The Amazing Spider-Man (1977–1979)
- The Amazing Spiez! (2009–2012) (France) (Canada)
- Amazing Stories (1985–1987)
- Amazing Stories (2020)
- Amazing Wedding Cakes (2008–2011)
- The Amazing World Of Gumball (2011–2019)
- Amazingness (2017–2018)
- Amazon (1999–2000)
- Ambassador (1998–1999) (UK)
- Ambassadors (2013) (UK)
- Amber (2014) (Ireland)
- Ambitions (2019)
- The Amber Rose Show (2016)
- Amen (1986–1991)
- America 2Night (1978)
- America Divided (2016–2018)
- America: Facts vs. Fiction (2013–2017)
- America Live with Megyn Kelly (2010–2013)
- America Outdoors (2022–2023)
- America ReFramed (2012)
- America Says (2018–present)
- America: The Story of Us (2010)
- America This Morning (1982–present)
- America Unearthed (2012–2019)
- American Auto (2021–2023)
- America's Best Dance Crew (2008–2015)
- America's Big Deal (2021)
- America's Culinary Cup (2026–present)
- America's Cutest (2014)
- America's Election Headquarters (2008)
- America's Funniest Home Videos (1989–present)
- America's Funniest People (1990–1994)
- America's Got Talent (2006–present)
- America's Got Talent: All-Stars (2023)
- America's Got Talent: The Champions (2019–2020)
- America's Got Talent: Fantasy League (2024)
- America's Lost Treasures (2012)
- America's Money Class with Suze Orman (2012)
- America's Most Musical Family (2019–2020)
- America's Most Talented Kid (2003–2005)
- America's Most Wanted (1988–present)
- America's Most Wanted: Missing Persons (2025–present)
- America's National Parks (2022–2023)
- America's News Headquarters (2008–present)
- America's Newsroom (2007–present)
- America's Next Great Restaurant (2011–present)
- America's Next Top Model (2003–2018)
- America's Prom Queen (2008)
- America's Psychic Challenge (2007)
- America's Secret Slang (2013–2014)
- America's Sweethearts: Dallas Cowboys Cheerleaders (2024–present)
- America's Test Kitchen (2001–present)
- America's Test Kitchen: The Next Generation (2022–2023)
- America's Top Dog (2020–present)
- America's Toughest Jobs (2008)
- Amish Mafia (2012–2015)
- The American Baking Competition (2013)
- American Bandstand (1952–1989)
- The American Bible Challenge (2012–2014)
- American Body Shop (2007)
- American Born Chinese (2023)
- American Candidate (2004)
- American Casino (2004–2005)
- American Chopper (2003–2020)
- American Classic (2026–present)
- American Crime (2015–2017)
- American Crime Story (2016–2021)
- American Dad! (2005–present)
- American Detective with Lt. Joe Kenda (2020–present)
- American Dragon: Jake Long (2005–2007)
- Amerian Dream (1981)
- American Dream Builders (2014)
- American Dream Derby (2005)
- American Dreamer (1990–1991)
- American Dreams (2002–2005)
- The American Embassy (2002)
- American Experience (1988–present)
- American Family (2002–2004)
- American Gangster (2006–2009)
- American Gigolo (2022)
- The American Girls (1978)
- American Gladiators (1989–1996)
- American Gladiators (2008)
- American Gods (2017–2021)
- American Gothic (1995–1996)
- American Gothic (2016)
- American Greed (2007–present)
- American Grit (2016–2017)
- American Guns (2011–2012)
- American Heiress (2007)
- American High (2001)
- American Hoggers (2011–2013)
- American Horror Stories (2021–2024)
- American Horror Story (2011–present)
- American Housewife (2016–2021)
- American Idol (2002–present)
- American Inventor (2006–2007)
- American Inventory (1958)
- American Justice (1992–2022)
- American Masters (1986)
- American Monster (2016–present)
- American Morning (2001–2011)
- American Ninja Challenge (2007–2009)
- American Ninja Warrior (2009–present)
- American Ninja Warrior: Ninja vs. Ninja (2016–2018)
- American Odyssey (2015)
- American Pickers (2010–present)
- American Playhouse (1982–1993)
- American Primeval (2025)
- American Princess (2005)
- American Princess (2019)
- American Restoration (2010–2016)
- The American Revolution (2014)
- The American Revolution (2025)
- American Rust (2021–2024)
- American Song Contest (2022)
- American Soul (2019–2020)
- American Sports Story (2024)
- American Vandal (2017–2018)
- The American West (2016)
- American Woman (2018)
- The Americans (1961)
- The Americans (2013–2018)
- The Americas (2025)
- Among Us (2026–present)
- The Amon 'n' Andy Show (1951–1953)
- Amos Burke: Secret Agent (1963–1966)
- Amphibia (2019–2022)
- Amsale Girls
- Amsterdam Empire (2025–present) (Netherlands)
- Amy Prentiss (1974–1975)

=== AN ===
- Anaon (2025–present) (France)
- An American Family (1973)
- Anatole (1998–1999) (France) (Canada) (UK)
- Anatomy of a Scandal (2022)
- Anchorwoman (2007)
- Ancient Aliens (2009–present)
- Ancient Discoveries (2003–2009) (UK)
- Ancient Inventions (1998) (UK)
- Ancient Skies (2019)
- Ancients Behaving Badly (2009)
- And Just Like That... (2021–2025)
- ...And Mother Makes Five (1974–1976)
- ...And Mother Makes Three (1974–1976)
- And the Beat Goes On (1996) (UK)
- And Then There Were None (2015) (UK)
- Anderson Live (2011–2013)
- Andi Mack (2017–2019)
- Andor (2022–2025)
- Andromeda (2000–2005) (Canada)
- The Andromeda Breakthrough (1962) (UK)
- The Andros Targets (1977)
- Andy Barker, P.I. (2007)
- Andy Capp (1988) (UK)
- The Andy Dick Show (2001–2002)
- The Andy Griffith Show (1960–1968)
- Andy Pandy (1950–2002) (UK)
- Andy Richter Controls the Universe (2002–2003)
- The Andy Williams Show (1962–1971)
- Angel (1999–2004)
- Angel from Hell (2016)
- Angela Anaconda (1999–2001) (Canada)
- Angelina Ballerina (2001–2006) (UK)
- Angelina Ballerina: The Next Steps (2009–2010)
- Angelo Rules (2010–present)
- Angie Tribeca (2016–2018)
- Anger Management (2012–2014)
- The Angry Beavers (1997–2006)
- Angry Birds Toons (2013–2016)
- Angry Boys (2011)
- Angry Kid (1998–2019) (UK)
- Angry Video Game Nerd (2004–present)
- An Idiot Abroad (2010–2012) (UK)
- Animal Control (2023–present)
- Animal Cops
  - Animal Cops: Detroit (2002–2008)
  - Animal Cops: Houston (2003–2012, 2014–2015)
  - Animal Cops: Philadelphia (2009–2010)
  - Animal Cops: San Francisco (2005)
  - Animal Cops: South Africa (2008)
  - Animal Cops: Phoenix (2006–2009, 2016–2018)
  - Animal Cops: Miami (2010–2011)
- Animal Crackers (1997–2000)
- Animal Jam (2003)
- Animal Mechanicals (2008–2011) (Canada)
- Animal Planet Report (2005–2006)
- Animal Practice (2012)
- Animalia (2007–2008) (Australia)
- Animaniacs
  - Animaniacs (1993–1998)
  - Animaniacs (2020–2023)
- The Animals of Farthing Wood (1993–1995) (UK) (France)
- Animorphs (1998–2000)
- Anna and the King (1972)
- The Anna Nicole Show (2002–2004)
- Anne of Green Gables (1979) (Japan)
- Anne of Green Gables: The Animated Series (2001–2002) (Canada)
- Anne of Green Gables: The Continuing Story (2000) (Canada)
- Anne of Green Gables: The Sequel (1987) (Canada)
- Anne with an E (2017–2019) (Canada)
- Annie Oakley (1954–1957)
- Another Day (1978)
- Another Period (2015–2018)
- Another World (1964–1999)
- Annoying Orange (2009–present)
- A.N.T. Farm (2011–2014)
- Anthony Bourdain: No Reservations (2005–2012)
- Anthony Bourdain: Parts Unknown (2013–2018)
- Antiques Roadshow (UK)
- Antiques Roadshow (US)
- Any Day Now (1998–2002)
- Any Dream Will Do (2007) (UK)
- Anyone for Tennyson? (1976–1978)
- Anything but Love (1989–1992)
- Anything You Can Do (1971–1974) (Canada)
- Annedroids (2014–2017) (Canada)

=== AP ===
- APB (2017)
- A.P. Bio (2018–2021)
- Appalachia: A History of Mountains and People (2009)
- Apple & Onion (2015; 2018–2021) (UK) (US)
- Apple's Way (1974–1975)
- Apples Never Fall (2024)
- The Apprentice
  - The Apprentice (2005–present) (UK)
  - The Apprentice (2004–2017) (US)
  - The Apprentice: Martha Stewart (2005) (US)
- Après Ski (2015)

=== AQ ===
- The Aquabats! Super Show! (2012–2014)
- Aquarium (1974) (Canada)
- Aquarius (2015–2016)
- Aqua Teen Hunger Force (2000; 2001–2015; 2023)

=== AR ===
- Arcane (2021–2024)
- Archer (1975)
- Archer (2009)
- Archie Bunker's Place (1979–1983)
- Archie's Weird Mysteries (1999–2000) (France) (US)
- Are You Afraid of the Dark? (1991–1996; 1999–2000; 2019–2022) (Canada) (US)
- Are You Being Served? (1972–1985) (UK)
- Are You Hot? (2003)
- Are You Smarter than a 5th Grader?
  - Are You Smarter than a 5th Grader? (2007–2009) (Australia)
  - Are You Smarter than a 5th Grader? (2007) (Belgium)
  - Are You Smarter than a 5th Grader? (2007–2008) (Brazil)
  - Are You Smarter than a 5th Grader? (2007) (Canada)
  - Are You Smarter than a 5th Grader? (2008–2010) (Chile)
  - Are You Smarter than a 5th Grader? (2007) (China)
  - Are You Smarter than a 5th Grader? (2007) (Denmark)
  - Are You Smarter than a 5th Grader? (2008–2009) (Finland)
  - Are You Smarter than a 5th Grader? (2007) (France)
  - Are You Smarter than a 5th Grader? (2007–2008) (Germany)
  - Are You Smarter than a 5th Grader? (2008) (India)
  - Are You Smarter than a 5th Grader? (2009–2011) (Indonesia)
  - Are You Smarter than a 5th Grader? (2008–2011) (Italy)
  - Are You Smarter than a 5th Grader? (2011; 2018-2025) (Japan)
  - Are You Smarter than a 5th Grader? (2007) (Lithuania)
  - Are You Smarter than a 5th Grader? (2009–2011) (Mexico)
  - Are You Smarter than a 5th Grader? (2007) (Netherlands)
  - Are You Smarter than a 5th Grader? (2007) (New Zealand)
  - Are You Smarter than a 5th Grader? (2007–2009) (Philippines)
  - Are You Smarter than a 5th Grader? (2007–2009) (Poland)
  - Are You Smarter than a 5th Grader? (2007–2008) (Portugal)
  - Are You Smarter than a 5th Grader? (2007) (Serbia)
  - Are You Smarter than a 5th Grader? (2007) (Slovakia)
  - Are You Smarter than a 5th Grader? (2007–2008) (Spain)
  - Are You Smarter than a 5th Grader? (2011–2020; 2023–present) (Sweden)
  - Are You Smarter than a 5th Grader? (2007–2010) (Thailand)
  - Are You Smarter than a 5th Grader? (2007–2010) (UK)
  - Are You Smarter than a 5th Grader? (2007–2019) (US)
- Are You the One? (2014–2019; 2023)
- Are You the One? Brasil (2015–2018) (Brazil)
- Are You There, Chelsea? (2012)
- The Ark (2023–present)
- Ark II (1976)
- Armed & Famous (2007)
- Army Wives (2007–2013)
- Arnie (1970–1972)
- Around the Horn (2002–2025)
- Around the World in 80 Days with Michael Palin (1989) (UK)
- The Arrangement (2010)
- The Arrangement (2017–2018)
- Arrested Development (2003–2006; 2013–2019)
- The Arrow (1997) (Canada)
- Arrow (2012–2020)
- The Arrow Show (1948–1949)
- Arrows (1976–1977) (UK)
- Armchair Cinema (1974–1975) (UK)
- Armchair Theatre (1956–1974) (UK)
- Armstrong Circle Theatre (1950–1963)
- The Arsenio Hall Show (1989–1994; 2013–2014)
- Art Attack (1990–2007; 2011–2015) (UK)
- Arthur (1996–2022) (Canada) (US)
- Arthur C. Clarke's Mysterious World (1980) (UK)
- Arthur Godfrey and His Friends (1949–1959)
- Arthur Godfrey's Talent Scouts (1946–1956)
- The Arthur Murray Party (1950–1960)

=== AS ===
- Ascension (2014) (Canada) (US)
- As the World Turns (2010)
- As Time Goes By
- As Told by Ginger (2000–2006)
- Ash vs. Evil Dead (2015–2018)
- Ashes To Ashes (2008–2010) (UK)
- The Ashlee Simpson Show (2004–2005)
- Ashlee + Evan (2018)
- Asia's Next Top Model (2012–2018)
- Ask the StoryBots (2016–2019)
- As the Bell Rings
  - As the Bell Rings (2011–2012) (Argentina)
  - As the Bell Rings (2007–2011) (Australia)
  - As the Bell Rings (2007–2011) (China)
  - As the Bell Rings (2010–2011) (Denmark & Sweden)
  - As the Bell Rings (2006–2010) (France)
  - As the Bell Rings (2006–2009) (Germany)
  - As the Bell Rings (2008–2009) (India)
  - As the Bell Rings (2010–2011) (Japan)
  - As the Bell Rings (2010–2012) (Malaysia)
  - As the Bell Rings (2010–2012) (Poland)
  - As the Bell Rings (2010–2012) (Russia)
  - As the Bell Rings (2007) (Singapore)
  - As the Bell Rings (2006–2009) (Spain)
  - As the Bell Rings (2012–2013) (Taiwan)
  - As the Bell Rings (2012–2013) (Turkey)
  - As the Bell Rings (2007–2008) (UK)
  - As the Bell Rings (2007–2009) (USA)
- Ask the Family (1967–1984; 1999; 2005)
- Ask This Old House (2002)
- The Asphalt Jungle (1961)
- The Assistants (2009) (Canada)
- Astroblast! (2014–2015)
- The Astronauts (2020–2021)
- The Astronaut Wives Club (2015)

=== AT ===
- Atlanta (2016–2022)
- Atlantis (2013–2015) (UK)
- Atom Ant (1965–1967)
- Atomic Betty (2004–2008) (Canada) (France)
- Atomic Puppet (2016–2017) (Canada) (France)
- Attack of the Killer Tomatoes! (1990–1991)
- Attack of the Show! (2005–2013; 2021–2022)
- Attack on Titan (2013–2023) (Japan)
- Atypical (2017–2021)
- At the Movies (1986–2010)
- A Touch of Frost (1992–2010) (UK)
- A Town Called Malice (2023) (UK)

=== AU ===
- Auction Hunters (2010–2015)
- Audrina (2011)
- Augie Doggie and Doggie Daddy (1959–1961)
- Austin & Ally (2011–2016)
- Austin City Limits (1976)
- Australia's Next Top Model (2005–2016) (Australia)

=== AV ===
- Avatar: The Last Airbender (2005–2008)
- The Avengers (1961–1969) (UK)
- Avengers Assemble (2013–2019)
- The Avengers: Earth's Mightiest Heroes (2010–2012)
- Average Joe (2003–2005)

=== AW ===
- AWA Championship Wrestling (1985–1990)
- Awake (2012)
- AwesomenessTV (2013–2015)
- Awkward (2011–2016)
- Away (2020)
- The A Word (2016–2020) (UK)

=== AX ===
- Axe Cop (2013; 2015)

Previous: List of television programs: numbers Next: List of television programs: B
