= List of television programs: G =

Alphabetically indexed lists of television programs
| 0-9 | A | B | C | D |
| E | F | G | H | I–J |
| K–L | M | N | O | P |
| Q–R | S | T | U–V–W | X–Y–Z |

This is an alphabetical list of television program articles (or sections within articles about television programs). Spaces and special characters are ignored. This list covers television programs whose first letter (excluding "the") of the title is G.

== G ==
=== GA ===
- Gabby's Dollhouse
- Gabby Duran & The Unsittables
- Gabriel's Fire
- Gadget & the Gadgetinis
- Gadget Boy & Heather
- Gal Circle
- Galactic Football
- Galavant
- The Gale Storm Show
- Gambit
- The Game (Australia)
- The Game (US)
- The Games (Australia)
- The Games (UK)
- Game of Crowns
- Game Shakers
- Game of Talents
- Game of Thrones
- Gamer's Guide to Pretty Much Everything
- Gameshow Marathon (UK)
- Gameshow Marathon (US)
- Gamezville
- Gandía Shore (Spain)
- Gangs of London
- Galtar and the Golden Lance
- The Garcias
- Gardeners' World
- Garfield and Friends
- The Garfield Show
- Gargoyles
- Garrow's Law
- The Garry Moore Show
- Garth Marenghi's Darkplace
- The Gaslight District
- The Gates
- The Gavin Crawford Show
- Gavin & Lott Show
- Gavin & Stacey (UK)
- Gawayn
- Gay for Play Game Show Starring RuPaul
- The Gayle King Show

=== GC ===
- GCB

=== GE ===
- G.E. College Bowl
- Gemini Man
- Gemusetto
- Gen:Lock
- Genera+ion
- Generation O!
- Generator Rex
- General Electric Theater
- General Hospital
- General Hospital: Night Shift
- The Generations Project
- Gene Simmons Family Jewels
- Genius Junior
- The Gentlemen
- Gentle Ben
- Geordie Shore (UK)
- George and Martha (Canada)
- George and Mildred
- The George Burns and Gracie Allen Show
- George Lopez
- The George Michael Sports Machine
- George of the Jungle
- George Shrinks
- Gerald McBoing-Boing
- Geraldo
- Get Ace (Australia)
- Get a Life
- Get Blake! (France)
- Get Ed
- Get Real (UK)
- Get Real (US)
- Get Smart (1965)
- Get Smart (1995)
- Get the Message
- Get the Picture
- Getting Together (1971)
- Geronimo Stilton
- Get Out Of My Room

=== GG ===
- GG Bond

=== GH ===
- Ghost Adventures
- Ghost Adventures: Aftershocks
- The Ghost and Molly McGee
- Ghostbusters
- Ghostforce
- Ghosthunters (UK)
- Ghost Hunters (US)
- Ghost Hunters Academy
- Ghost Hunters International
- Ghosthunting With...
- The Ghost & Mrs. Muir
- Ghost in the Shell: Stand Alone Complex
- Ghost Nation
- Ghost Stalkers
- Ghost Story
- Ghost Trackers
- Ghost Wars
- Ghost Whisperer
- Ghosted
- Ghosted: Love Gone Missing
- Ghosts (1995 UK)
- Ghosts (2019 UK)
- Ghosts (US)
- Ghostwriter

=== GI ===
- Giada at Home
- Giada in Paradise
- Giada's Weekend Getaways
- G.I. Joe: A Real American Hero (1985)
- G.I. Joe: A Real American Hero (1989)
- G.I. Joe Extreme
- G.I. Joe: Renegades
- G.I. Joe: Sigma 6
- Gideon's Crossing
- Gideon's Way
- Gidget
- The Gifted
- Gigantic
- Gigantor
- Gigolos
- The Gilded Age
- Gilligan's Island
- Gilmore Girls
- Gilmore Girls: A Year in the Life
- Gimme a Break
- Gintama
- The Girl Before
- Girlboss
- Girl Code
- The Girl from U.N.C.L.E.
- Girl Meets World
- Girlstuff/Boystuff
- Girls5eva
- Girls v. Boys
- The Girl With Something Extra
- Girlfriends
- Girlfriends' Guide to Divorce
- Girls
- Girls Behaving Badly
- Girls Club
- The Girls Next Door
- The Girls Next Door: The Bunny House
- The Girls on the Bus
- Giuliana and Bill
- Give Us a Clue (UK)
- Giver

=== GL ===
- The Glades
- Gladiators
- Gladiators 2000
- Gladiators: Train 2 Win (UK)
- The Glass House
- Glee
- The Glee Project
- The Glen Campbell Goodtime Hour
- Glenn Beck Program
- Glenn Martin DDS
- Glitch AUS
- Glitch Techs
- Glitter Force
- Glitter Force Doki Doki
- Gloria
- GLOW
- Glow Up

=== GO ===
- Go
- Go Away, Unicorn!
- Go-Big Show
- Go, Diego, Go!
- GoGo Sentai Boukenger
- Go! Go! Cory Carson
- Go Jetters
- Go On
- Goblin Hill
- God Friended Me
- Godless
- Godzilla: The Series
- Gogs
- Goin' Bulilit
- Going Live!
- Going Places (US)
- Going Places (Australia)
- The Goldbergs (1949)
- The Goldbergs (2013)
- Golden Boy
- The Golden Girls
- The Golden Palace
- Golden Sisters
- Goldie & Bear
- Goliath
- Gomer Pyle, U.S.M.C.
- Gomorrah
- Gone (international, 2017)
- Gone (British, 2026)
- Gone Country
- The Gong Show
- Good Behavior
- Good Bones
- Good Day L.A.
- Good Doctor (South Korea)
- The Good Doctor (US)
- Good Eats
- The Goode Family
- The Good Fight
- Good Girls
- Good Girls Revolt
- Good Grief
- The Good Guys
- The Goodies
- The Good Life (1971)
- The Good Life (1994)
- The Good Lord Bird
- Good Luck Charlie
- Good Morning America
- Good Morning Britain
- Good Morning, Miami
- Good Morning, Mickey!
- Good Morning, Miss Bliss
- Goodness Gracious Me
- Good Omens
- The Good Place
- Good Times
- Good Trouble
- The Good Wife (South Korea)
- The Good Wife (US)
- Good Witch
- Good Work
- Goof Troop
- Gordon Ramsay: Cookalong Live (UK)
- Gordon Ramsay: Uncharted
- Gordon Ramsay's 24 Hours to Hell & Back
- Gordon Ramsay's Home Cooking (UK)
- Gordon Ramsay's Ultimate Cookery Course (UK)
- Goosebumps
- Gossip Girl (2007)
- Gossip Girl (2021)
- Gossip Girl: Acapulco (Mexico)
- Gossip Girl: Thailand
- Gotham
- The Governor & J.J.

=== GR ===
- Grace (UK)
- Grace & Favour
- Grace and Frankie
- Grace Under Fire
- The Graham Norton Show (UK)
- Grand Army
- Grand Designs
- Grand Hotel
- Grandfathered
- Grandstand
- The Grand Tour
- Grange Hill (UK)
- Gravity Falls
- The Great
- The Great American Baking Show
- The Great British Bake Off (UK)
- The Great British Bake Off: An Extra Slice (UK)
- The Great British Sewing Bee (UK)
- Great Chefs
- The Great Christmas Light Fight
- The Great Food Truck Race
- The Great Indoors
- Great News
- The Great North
- Great Performances
- The Great Pottery Throw Down (UK)
- The Great Space Coaster
- The Greatest American Hero
- Greatest Party Story Ever
- Greed
- Greek
- Green Acres
- The Green Green Grass
- Greenhouse Academy
- Greenleaf
- Green Wing
- Greg the Bunny
- Grey's Anatomy
- Griff
- Grim & Evil
- The Grim Adventures of Billy and Mandy
- Grimm
- Grizzy & the Lemmings (France)
- Grojband (Canada)
- Groove High
- Grossology
- Ground Force
- Grounded for Life
- Groundling Marsh
- Growing Pains
- Growing Up Fisher
- Growing up with Chinese (China)
- Growing Up Creepie
- Grown-ish

=== GU ===
- Guess with Jess
- Guiding Light
- Les Guignols de l'info (France)
- Guilt (US)
- Guilt (UK)
- Guilty Party
- Guinevere Jones
- Gullah Gullah Island
- Gumby
- Gundam Seed
- Gundam Seed Destiny
- Gundam Wing
- Gundam X
- Gunslinger Girl
- Gunsmoke
- Gurren Lagann
- Guy Code
- Guy Court
- Guy Lombardo's Diamond Jubilee
- Guy Off the Hook
- Guy's Big Bite
- Guy's Grocery Games

=== GY ===
- Gypsy Sisters

Previous: List of television programs: F Next: List of television programs: H
