= List of television programs: H =

Alphabetically indexed lists of television programs
0–9	A	B	C	D	E	F	G	H	I–J
K–L	M	N	O	P	Q–R	S	T	U–V–W	X–Y–Z

This is an alphabetical list of television program articles (or sections within articles about television programs). Spaces and special characters are ignored. This list covers television programs whose first letter (excluding "the") of the title is H.

== H ==
=== Numbers ===
- H_{2}O: Just Add Water (Australia)
- H8R

=== HA ===
- Hacks
- Hadleigh
- Hailey's On It!
- Hala Al Turk Show
- Half & Half
- Halftime Heat
- Hallmark Hall of Fame
- Hallo K3
- Halloween Wars
- Halt and Catch Fire (TV series)
- HaMerotz LaMillion (Israel)
- Hammerman
- Hamster & Gretel
- Hanazuki: Full of Treasures
- Hand of God
- Hand Shakers (Japan)
- The Handmaid's Tale
- Handy Manny
- Hangin' with Mr. Cooper
- Hannah Montana
- Hannibal
- Hannity & Colmes
- Happily Divorced
- Happily Ever After: Fairy Tales for Every Child
- Happy (1960–1961)
- Happy! (2017–2019)
- Happy Days
- Happy Endings
- Happy Family (US)
- Happy Family (China)
- Happy Heroes
- Happy Monster Band
- Happy Together (South Korea) (1999)
- Happy Together (South Korea) (2001)
- Happy Together (Russia)
- Happy Together (US)
- Happy Town
- Happy Valley
- Happy Tree Friends
- Hardcastle and McCormick
- The Hard Times of RJ Berger
- The Hardy Boys (1969)
- The Hardy Boys (2020)
- The Hardy Boys/Nancy Drew Mysteries
- Harley Quinn
- Harper's Island
- Harper Valley PTA
- Harris Against the World
- Harry (France)
- Harry (UK)
- Harry (US)
- Harry and Bunnie (Malaysia)
- Harry Hill's TV Burp (UK)
- Harry the Bunny
- Harry O
- Hart of Dixie
- Hart to Hart
- Harvey Beaks
- Harvey Birdman, Attorney at Law
- Harvey Street Forever
- Hasbro The Game Show
- Haunted (UK)
- Haunted (US) (2002)
- Haunted (US) (2018)
- The Haunted
- Haunted Collector
- The Haunted Hathaways
- The Haunting of Hill House
- The Haunted House
- Have Gun - Will Travel
- Have I Got News for You (UK)
- Haven
- The Haves and the Have Nots
- Hawaii Five-O (1968)
- Hawaii Five-0 (2010)
- Hawaii Life
- Hawkeye
- Hawkins
- Hawthorne
- Hazbin Hotel (Web series)
- Hazel
- Hati Tanpa Rasa (Malaysia)

=== HB ===
- HBO World Championship Boxing
- HBO Storybook Musicals

=== HE ===
- The Head
- Heads Up!
- Headbangers Ball
- Healer (South Korea)
- Heartland (Canada)
- The Heartland Series
- Heartbeat (UK)
- HeartBeat (US) (1988)
- Heartbeat (US) (2016)
- Heathcliff
- Hector's House
- Hee Haw
- Heist
- Hellcats
- Hellevator
- Hell on Wheels
- Helluva Boss (Web series)
- Hell's Kitchen (UK)
- Hell's Kitchen (US)
- He-Man and the Masters of the Universe
  - He-Man and the Masters of the Universe (2002)
  - He-Man and the Masters of the Universe (2021)
- Henry Danger
- Henry Hugglemonster
- Henry's Cat
- Henry's World
- The Herbs (UK)
- Hercules
- Hercules: The Legendary Journeys
- The Herd with Colin Cowherd
- Here Comes Honey Boo Boo
- Here We Go Again (1973)
- Here We Go Again (2016)
- Here's Humphrey
- Here's Lucy
- Hergé's Adventures of Tintin
- Herman's Head
- Hermie and Friends
- Hero High
- Hero 108
- Hero Elementary
- Heroes
- Heroes Reborn
- Heston's Feasts
- Hetty in Hawaii
- Hex
- Hey Arnold!
- Hey Dude
- Hey Duggee
- Hey, Jeannie!
- Hey Monie!
- Hey Vern, It's Ernest!

=== HG ===
- HGTV Star

=== HI ===
- Hi-5
- Hi-de-Hi!
- Higglytown Heroes
- High Desert
- High Fidelity
- The High Fructose Adventures of Annoying Orange
- High Potential
- High School Musical: Get in the Picture
- High School Musical: The Musical: The Series
- High School USA
- High Society
- Highlander
- Highway Patrol
- Highway to Heaven
- Hi Hi Puffy AmiYumi
- Hilda
- Hill Street Blues
- The Hills
- The Hills: New Beginnings
- Hinterland
- Hip Hop Harry
- Hip Hop Squares
- His and Hers (Australia)
- His & Hers (US)
- His Dark Materials (TV series)
- The Hitchhiker
- Hitchhikers Guide to the Galaxy
- Hilltop Hospital
- Hit the Floor
- Hizzonner

=== HO ===
- Hoarders
- Hockey Wives (Canada)
- Hogan Knows Best
- Hogan's Heroes
- Holby City (UK)
- Holiday Baking Championship
- Hole in the Wall (US)
- Hole in the Wall (UK)
- Hole in the Wall (Australia)
- Holly & Stephen's Saturday Showdown
- Holly Hobbie (Canada)
- Hollywood Darlings
- Hollywood Divas
- Hollywood Game Night
- Hollywood Heights
- Hollywood Love Story
- Hollywood Medium with Tyler Henry
- Hollywood Squares
- Holly's World
- Holmes & Yo-Yo
- Holy Foley!
- Home: Adventures with Tip & Oh
- Home and Away
- Home and Family
- Home Economics
- Home Improvement
- Home Movies
- Homefront
- Homeland
- Hometime
- Home Town
- Hometown
- Homewrecker
- Homicide: Life on the Street
- Homicide: Second Shift
- The Honeymooners
- Hong Kong
- Hong Kong Phooey
- Hooten & the Lady
- Hope & Faith
- Hope and Gloria
- Hopkins
- Hopla
- Horne & Corden (UK)
- Horrible Histories (UK)
- Horrid Henry (UK)
- Horseland
- Hot in Cleveland
- Hot Date
- Hot L Baltimore
- Hot Ones
- Hot Potato
- Hot Wheels
- Hot Wheels Battle Force 5
- Hotel
- Hotel Hell
- Hotel Impossible
- Hotel Transylvania: The Series
- The Hotwives
- The Hour
- House
- House Calls
- House of Anubis
- House of Cards (UK)
- House of Cards (US)
- House of Carters
- House Doctor (UK)
- House Hunters
- House of Lies
- House of Mouse
- Houston Beauty
- How Booze Built America
- How I Met Your Mother
- How I Met Your Father
- How It's Made
- How Do I Look?
- How Do They Do It?
- How to Be Indie
- How to Get Away with Murder
- How to Rock
- How to Live Longer
- How We Invented The World
- How We Roll
- The Howard Stern Show
- Howie Do It
- Howdy Doody
- Hoze Houndz

=== HR ===
- H.R. Pufnstuf

=== HU ===
- Hubert & Takako
- Huckleberry Hound
- Huff
- The Huggabug Club
- The Hughleys
- Hulk and the Agents of S.M.A.S.H.
- Hulk Hogan's Celebrity Championship Wrestling
- Hulk Hogan's Rock 'n Wrestling
- Hullabaloo
- Human Target (1992)
- Human Target (2010)
- Humans
- Humans of New York: The Series
- Hung
- Hunted (UK) (2012)
- Hunted (UK) (2015)
- Hunted (US)
- Hunter (Australia) (1984)
- Hunter (Australia) (1967)
- Hunter (UK) (2009)
- Hunter (US) (1977)
- Hunter (US) (1984–1991)
- Huntik: Secrets & Seekers
- The Huntress
- The Huntley-Brinkley Report
- Hurricanes
- Hustle
- Hunter Street

=== HY ===
- Hyperdrive

Previous: List of television programs: G Next: List of television programs: I-J
