= List of television programs: X–Y–Z =

Alphabetically indexed lists of television programs
0–9	A	B	C	D	E	F	G	H	I–J
K–L	M	N	O	P	Q–R	S	T	U–V–W	X–Y–Z

This is an alphabetical list of television program articles (or sections within articles about television programs). Spaces and special characters are ignored. This list covers television programs whose first letter (excluding "the") of the title are X, Y, and Z.

== X ==
=== XA ===
- Xavier: Renegade Angel (2007–2009)
- Xavier Riddle and the Secret Museum (2019–2026)

=== XC ===
- Xchange (2000-2006)
- X Company (2015-2017)

=== XE ===
- Xena: Warrior Princess (1995-2001)

=== XF ===
- The X Factor
  - The X Factor (Australia)
  - The X Factor (UK)
    - The X Factor: Celebrity
  - The X Factor (US)
  - The X-Factor (Hungary)
- The X-Files

=== XI ===
- Xiao Kang Kang
- Xiaolin Chronicles
- Xiaolin Showdown

=== XM ===
- X-Men (1992)
- X-Men (2011)
- X-Men '97
- X-Men: Evolution

=== XP ===
- X-Play

=== XS ===
- The X's
- The X Show (1999-2001)

=== XT ===
- The Xtra Factor (UK)

=== XU ===
- Xuxa

=== XX ===
- xxxHolic

=== XY ===
- Xyber 9: New Dawn

== Y ==
=== YA ===
- Yabba Dabba Dinosaurs
- Yancy Derringer
- Yanks Go Home
- Yard Crashers
- Yashahime: Princess Half-Demon

=== YE ===
- The Yellow Rose
- Yellowjackets
- Yellowstone
- Yes, Dear
- Yes Minister
- Yes, Prime Minister

=== YI ===
- Yin Yang Yo!

=== YO ===
- Yo Gabba Gabba!
- Yogi Bear
- Yogi's Gang
- Yogi's Treasure Hunt
- Yo-kai Watch
- Yoko! Jakamoko! Toto!
- YOLO: Crystal Fantasy
- YooHoo & Friends (2009)
- YooHoo & Friends (2012)
- Yo Se Que Mentia (Puerto Rico)
- Yo Yogi!
- Yoru no Yatterman
- You
- You Again?
- You Are There
- You Asked For It
- You Bet Your Life
- You Can't Do That on Television
- You Gotta See This
- You're On!
- You're Only Young Twice (UK) (1971)
- You're Only Young Twice (UK) (1977)
- You're the Worst
- You've Been Framed
- Young & Hungry
- The Young and the Restless
- Younger
- Young Blades
- The Young Doctors
- Young Dracula
- The Young Indiana Jones Chronicles
- Young Justice
- The Young Marrieds
- The Young Ones
- The Young Pope
- The Young Riders
- Young Robin Hood
- Young Rock
- Young Sheldon
- Young Talent Time
- Your Hit Parade
- Your Honor
- Your OWN Show: Oprah's Search for the Next TV Star
- Your Pretty Face Is Going to Hell
- Your Show of Shows
- Yours, Mine or Ours
- Yonderland

=== YU ===
- Yu-Gi-Oh!
- Yu-Gi-Oh! 5D's
- Yu-Gi-Oh! Duel Monsters
- Yu-Gi-Oh! GX
- Yu-Gi-Oh! Zexal
- Yuki Yuna is a Hero
- Yule Log
- Yuri on Ice
- YuYu Hakusho

== Z ==
=== ZA ===
- Zack & Quack
- The Zack Files
- Zak Storm
- Zane Grey Theater
- Zatch Bell!

=== ZC ===
- Z-Cars

=== ZE ===
- Zeke and Luther
- Zeke's Pad (Australia/Canada)
- The Zeta Project

=== ZH ===
- The ZhuZhus

=== ZI ===
- Zig and Sharko
- Zigby
- Zixx

=== ZO ===
- Zoe, Duncan, Jack and Jane (a.k.a. Zoe)
- Zoé Kézako
- Zoey 101
- Zoey's Extraordinary Playlist
- Zoids
- Zoink'd
- Zombiedumb
- Zombies: The Re-Animated Series
- Zoo
- Zoo Diaries
- Zoobilee Zoo
- Zooboomafoo
- The Zoo Gang (Australia)
- ZOOM (1972)
- ZOOM (1999)
- Zorro (1957)
- Zorro (1990)
- Zorro (Philippines)
- Zorro and Son (1983)
- Zorro: La Espada y la Rosa (2007)
- Zorro: Generation Z (2008)
- El Zorro, la espada y la rosa (Columbia)
- Zou

=== ZS ===
- Z-Squad

=== ZU ===
- The Zula Patrol (2005-2008)
- Zumbo (SBS 2011)

Previous: List of television programs: U-V-W
