= List of television programs: O =

Alphabetically indexed lists of television programs
0–9	A	B	C	D	E	F	G	H	I–J
K–L	M	N	O	P	Q–R	S	T	U–V–W	X–Y–Z

This is an alphabetical list of television program articles (or sections within articles about television programs). Spaces and special characters are ignored. This list covers television programs whose first letter (excluding "the") of the title is O.

== O ==
=== Numbers ===
- O2Be

=== OB ===
- Obi-Wan Kenobi
- The Oblongs

=== OC ===
- The O.C.
- Ocean of Fear: Worst Shark Attack Ever
- Ocean Girl
- October Road
- Octonauts

=== OD ===
- The Odd Couple (1970)
- The Odd Couple (2015)
- Odd Folks Home
- Odd Job Jack
- Odd Man Out (UK)
- Odd Man Out (US)
- Odd Mom Out
- Odd One In (British comedy panel game show)
- Odd One Out (British TV quiz)
- Odd Squad
- Oddbods
- Oddities
- Oddville, MTV
- Odyssey 5

=== OF ===
- The Office (UK)
- The Office (US) (1995)
- The Office (US) (2005)
- Off Limits
- Off the Air
- Off the Map

=== OG ===
- O'Grady
- Oggy and the Cockroaches

=== OH ===
- Ohara
- Oh Madeline
- Oh! Those Bells
- Oh Yeah! Cartoons

=== OI ===
- Oi Aparadektoi

=== OK ===
- OK K.O.! Let's Be Heroes
- OK! TV (UK)

=== OL ===
- The Old Man
- Óli á Hrauni (Icelandic)
- Oliver Beene
- Oliver Twist (1999)
- Oliver Twist (2007)
- Olivia
- Ollie and Scoops (Web series)

=== OM ===
- Omnibus, Italian talk show (2002)
- Omnibus, UK series (1967)
- Omnibus, US series (1952)
- Om Nom Stories
- Omukae desu, Japanese television drama

=== ON ===
- On the Farm with Farmer Bob
- On the Rocks
- On the Team
- On the Up (British Sitcom)
- Once Again (Philippines)
- Once and Again
- Once Upon a Time
- Once Upon a Time in Wonderland
- One Day
- One Day at a Time (1975)
- One Day at a Time (2017)
- One Foot in the Grave
- One Life to Live
- One Man's Family
- One Mississippi
- One of the Boys
- One on One
- One Piece, Japanese anime series
- One-Punch Man, Japanese anime series (2015)
- The One Show (British)
- One Stroke Painting with Donna Dewberry
- One Tree Hill
- Online Nation
- Only Fools and Horses
- Only Murders in the Building
- The Only Way Is Essex (British)

=== OO ===
- Oobi

=== OP ===
- Opening Act
- Open All Hours
- Open Heart
- Open House (Ireland)
- Operation Love (China)
- Opposite Sex
- Opposite Worlds
- Oprah's Lifeclass
- Oprah's Master Class
- Oprah Prime
- Oprah: Where Are They Now?
- The Oprah Winfrey Show

=== OR ===
- The Oregon Trail
- Orphan Black
- The O'Reilly Factor
- Orange Is the New Black
- The Original Amateur Hour
- The Originals
- The Orville

=== OS ===
- The Osbournes
- Oscar's Oasis
- Osmar: the Heel of the Loaf
- Oswald

=== OT ===
- The Others
- The Other Kingdom
- The Other Two
- Otherworld

=== OU ===
- Our America with Lisa Ling
- Our Flag Means Death
- Our Friends in the North
- Our Hero
- Our House
- Our Miss Brooks
- Our Private World
- Outback Jack
- OutDaughtered
- Outlaw
- Out of the Blue
- Out of the Box
- Out of Control
- Out of Jimmy's Head
- Out of This World
- Out There (2003)
- Outer Banks
- The Outer Limits (1963)
- The Outer Limits (1995)
- Outer Space Astronauts
- Outlaws (1960–1962)
- Outlaws (1986–1987)
- Outnumbered (British sitcom)
- Outside the Lines
- The Outsiders (Australia)
- The Outsiders (Taiwan)
- The Outsiders (US)
- Outsiders (Australia)
- Outsiders (US)
- Outsourced

=== OV ===
- Over the Garden Wall
- Over There
- Overruled!

=== OW ===
- Owen Marshall: Counselor at Law
- The Owl House

=== OY ===
- Oye! It's Friday!

=== OZ ===
- Oz
- Ozark
- Ozark Jubilee
- The Oz Kids
- Ozzy & Drix
- Ozzy & Jack's World Detour

Previous: List of television programs: N Next: List of television programs: P
