= List of television programs: E =

Alphabetically indexed lists of television programs
0-9	A	B	C	D
E	F	G	H	I–J
K–L	M	N	O	P
Q–R	S	T	U–V–W	X–Y–Z

This is an alphabetical list of television program articles (or sections within articles about television programs). Spaces and special characters are ignored. This list covers television programs whose first letter (excluding "the") of the title is E.

== E ==
=== Numbers ===
- E:60

=== EA ===
- Eagleheart
- Early Doors
- Early Edition
- The Early Show
- Earth 2
- Earth Final Conflict
- Earth Revealed: Introductory Geology
- Earth to Luna
- Earthworm Jim
- Eastbound & Down
- EastEnders
- East Midlands Today
- Eastwick
- Eat Bulaga! (Philippines)

=== EB ===
- Ebb and Flo

=== EC ===
- Echo
- Eckhart
- ECW Hardcore TV
- ECW on TNN

=== ED ===
- Ed
- Ed, Edd n Eddy
- The Ed Sullivan Show
- Eddsworld (Web series)
- The Eddy Arnold Show
- Eddy Arnold Time
- Eden of the East
- Edgar & Ellen
- The Edge (US)
- The Edge and Christian Show
- The Edge of Space
- The Edge of Night
- Educating Joey Essex (British)

=== EE ===
- Eek! the Cat
- Eerie, Indiana

=== EI ===
- E Is for Edie
- Eight Is Enough
- The Eighties

=== EJ ===
- Ejector Seat
- EJNYC

=== EL ===
- El Chapulín Colorado Animado (Mexico)
- El Chavo Animado (Mexico)
- El Chavo del Ocho (Mexico)
- Electra Woman and Dyna Girl (1976)
- Electra Woman and Dyna Girl (2001)
- The Electric Company (1971)
- The Electric Company (2009)
- Elementary
- Elena of Avalor
- The Elephant Princess (Australia)
- Eli Stone
- Elizabeth R
- Elinor Wonders Why
- Ella the Elephant
- Ellen
- The Ellen DeGeneres Show
- The Ellen Show
- Ellen's Acres
- Ellen's Design Challenge
- Ellen's Game of Games
- Elliot Moose
- Elmo's World
- El Perro y El Gato
- El Tigre: The Adventures of Manny Rivera
- Eliot Kid
- Elliott from Earth
- Eleventh Hour (UK)
- Eleventh Hour (US)
- Ellery Queen
- Elsbeth

=== EM ===
- Emergency!
- Emergency +4
- Emergency Vets
- Emily's Reasons Why Not
- Emmerdale
- Emogenius
- Emojicats World
- The Emperor's New School
- Empire (1962)
- Empire (1984)
- Empire (2005)
- Empire (2012)
- Empire (2015)
- Empresses in the Palace
- Empty Nest

=== EN ===
- E.N.G.
- Encantadia
- The End of the F***ing World
- Endgame
- The Enemy Within
- E! News
- Engie Benjy (UK)
- Engine Sentai Go-Onger
- The English Game
- English Teacher
- Enlightened
- Enlisted
- Enos
- Ensign O'Toole
- Entertainment Tonight
- Entourage

=== EO ===
- Eon Kid

=== EP ===
- The Epic Tales of Captain Underpants
- Episodes

=== EQ ===
- The Equalizer (1985)
- The Equalizer (2021)
- Equal Time

=== ER ===
- E/R (sitcom)
- ER
- Eric
- The Eric Andre Show
- Eric & Jessie: Game On
- Eric Sykes
- Erin & Aaron
- E-Ring
- Erky Perky
- Eromanga Sensei (Japan)

=== ES ===
- Escape Club
- Escrava Isaura (Brazil)
- ESPN Sports Saturday
- ESPN Sunday Night Football
- E Street
- Esme & Roy

=== ET ===
- Eternal Law
- E! True Hollywood Story

=== EU ===
- Euphoria
- Eureka (2006)
- Eureka (2022)
- Eureeka's Castle
- European Football Show (UK)

=== EV ===
- Eva & Adam (Sweden)
- Even Stevens
- Evening Shade
- The Event
- The Everglades
- Everwood
- Ever After High
- Ever Decreasing Circles (BBC)
- Every Witch Way
- Everybody Hates Chris
- Everybody Loves a Moose
- Everybody Loves Raymond
- Everyday Italian
- Everyday Active
- Everything's Rosie
- Everything Sucks!
- Evil Con Carne

=== EX ===
- Ex on the Beach (UK)
- Ex on the Beach (US)
- Ex on the Beach Poland
- Excused
- The Exes
- Exit 57
- The Exorcist
- Exosquad
- The Expanse
- Extended Family
- Expedition Robinson (Sweden)
- Expedition Unknown
- Exposé: America's Investigative Reports
- Extra
- Extra Challenge
- Extra Gear (Web series)
- Extras
- Extra Turkey
- Extraordinary People
- Extreme Clutter with Peter Walsh
- Extreme Dodgeball
- Extreme Evidence
- Extreme Ghostbusters
- Extreme Makeover
- Extreme Makeover: Home Edition
- Extreme Weight Loss

=== EY ===
- Eye Candy
- Eye Guess
- Eyewitness (1994)
- Eyewitness (2016)
- Eye Witness

=== EZ ===
- EZ Streets

Previous: List of television programs: D Next: List of television programs: F
