= List of television programs: I–J =

Alphabetically indexed lists of television programs
0–9	A	B	C	D	E	F	G	H	I–J
K–L	M	N	O	P	Q–R	S	T	U–V–W	X–Y–Z

This is an alphabetical list of television program articles (or sections within articles about television programs). Spaces and special characters are ignored. This list covers television programs whose first letter (excluding "the") of the title are I and J.

== I ==
=== IA ===
- I (Almost) Got Away with It
- I Am Cait
- I Am Frankie
- I Am Weasel

=== IC ===
- I Can Do That
- I Can See Your Voice
  - I Can See Your Voice (South Korea)
  - I Can See Your Voice (US)
- iCarly (2007)
- iCarly (2021)
- Ice
- Ice & Coco
- Ice Fantasy
- Ice Loves Coco
- Ice Road Truckers
- Ichabod and Me
- Icon

=== ID ===
- I'd Do Anything (UK)
- I Didn't Do It
- Idiotest
- The Idolmaster Cinderella Girls
- I Dream of Jeannie
- I Dream of NeNe: The Wedding

=== IF ===
- I Feel Bad
- If Loving You Is Wrong

=== IG ===
- I Got a Rocket

=== IL ===
- I'll Fly Away
- I Love Lucy
- I Love Money
- I Love New York
- I Love That for You
- The Iliza Shlesinger Sketch Show

=== IM ===
- Imaginary Mary
- I'm a Celebrity...Get Me Out of Here! (UK)
- I'm a Celebrity...Get Me Out of Here! (US)
- I'm Alan Partridge
- I'm in the Band
- The Immortal
- Impact!
- Impact! Xplosion
- Impastor
- Imposters
- Impractical Jokers (US)
- Impractical Jokers UK
- I'm Telling!
- I'm with Her
- Imagination Movers

=== IN ===
- The InBetween
- The Inbetweeners (UK)
- The Inbetweeners (US)
- Inch High, Private Eye
- Income Property
- Incorporated
- Incredible Crew
- The Incredible Hulk
- Indebted
- Infinity Train
- The Ingraham Angle
- Inhumanoids
- Inhumans
- Ink Master
- Inquizition
- In the Dark
- In the House
- In Living Color
- In Plain Sight
- In Real Life
- In the Flesh
- Insane Coaster Wars
- Insatiable
- In Search of...
- In Sickness and In Health
- The Inside
- Inside the Actors Studio
- Inside Dish
- Inside Edition
- Inside Politics
- Inside Washington
- The Insider
- The Inspector Alleyn Mysteries (British)
- Inspector Gadget (1983)
- Inspector Gadget (2015)
- The Inspector Lynley Mysteries (UK)
- Inspector Morse
- Instant Mom
- Instant Star
- Interior Therapy with Jeff Lewis
- The Interns
- Interpol Calling
- Intervention
- Intimate Portrait
- In the Heat of the Night
- In the Night Garden...
- In Treatment
- InuYasha
- Invader Zim
- The Invaders
- The Investigators (1961)
- Invincible

=== IP ===
- I Pity the Fool

=== IR ===
- Iron Chef (Japan)
- Iron Chef America
- Iron Chef Australia
- Iron Chef Gauntlet
- Iron Chef Showdown
- Iron Chef UK
- Iron Chef USA
- Iron Chef Vietnam
- Iron Fist
- Iron Kid
- Iron Man
- Iron Man: Armored Adventures
- Ironside (1967)
- Ironside (2013)

=== IS ===
- The Isiah Factor Uncensored
- I Shouldn't Be Alive
- I Spy (1955)
- I Spy (1965)
- I Spy (2002)
- The Islanders

=== IT ===
- The IT Crowd
- I Think You Should Leave with Tim Robinson
- It Takes a Thief (1968)
- It Takes a Thief (2005)
- It's About Time
- It's All About Amy (UK)
- It's All in the Game
- It's Always Jan
- It's Always Sunny in Philadelphia
- It's a Brad, Brad World
- It's Garry Shandling's Show
- It's a Knockout
- It's a Living (Canada)
- It's a Living (US)
- It's Me or the Dog
- It's a Miracle
- It's Not You, It's Men
- It's Pony
- It's Punky Brewster
- It's Showtime (Philippines)
- It's a Square World
- It's Worth What?
- It's Your Call with Lynn Doyle

=== IV ===
- Ivanhoe (1958)
- Ivanhoe (1970)
- I've Got a Secret
- Ivor the Engine (UK)

=== IW ===
- I Wanna Be a Soap Star

=== IY ===
- Iyanla: Fix My Life

=== IZ ===
- iZombie

== J ==
=== JA ===
- Jabberjaw
- Jabu's Jungle
- Jackass
- Jacob Two-Two
- The Jack Benny Program
- Jack's Big Music Show
- Jack & Bobby
- Jack Hanna's Animal Adventures
- Jack Hanna's Into the Wild
- Jack Ryan
- Jackie Chan Adventures
- The Jackie Gleason Show
- Jack of All Trades
- The Jack Paar Program
- Jack the Ripper (UK)
- Jackanory
- Jackpot
- The Jacksons: Next Generation
- JAG
- Jagger Eaton's Mega Life
- Jail
- Jake 2.0
- Jake and the Fatman
- Jake and the Never Land Pirates
- Jakers! The Adventures of Piggley Winks
- James at 15 (later James at 16)
- James Bond Jr.
- Jamie and the Magic Torch
- The Jamie Foxx Show
- Jamie's Got Tentacles!
- Ja'mie: Private School Girl
- Jana of the Jungle
- Jane and the Dragon
- Jane By Design
- Jane Eyre (2006) (UK)
- Jane Velez-Mitchell
- Jane the Virgin
- Jango
- The Janice Dickinson Modeling Agency
- Jason King (UK)
- Jason of Star Command
- Jayce and the Wheeled Warriors
- Jay Jay the Jet Plane
- The Jay Leno Show
- Jay Leno's Garage

=== JE ===
- The Jeannie Carson Show
- The Jeff Foxworthy Show
- The Jeffersons
- Jellystone!
- Jem
- Jenny
- The Jenny McCarthy Show (1997)
- The Jenny McCarthy Show (2013)
- Jeopardy!
- Jep!
- Jeremiah
- The Jeremy Kyle Show (UK)
- The Jeremy Kyle Show (US)
- Jeremy Vine (UK)
- Jericho
- Jerry Lewis MDA Telethon
- The Jerry Springer Show
- The Jersey
- Jerseylicious
- Jersey Shore
- Jersey Shore: Family Vacation
- Jesse
- Jessica's Big Little World
- Jessica Jones
- Jessie (1984)
- Jessie (2011)
- The Jetsons
- Jewelpet (Japan)

=== JI ===
- Jim Henson's Animal Show
- Jim Henson's Creature Shop Challenge
- Jim Henson's Mother Goose Stories
- Jim Henson's Pajanimals
- The Jim Jefferies Show
- Jimbo and the Jet-Set (UK)
- The Jimmie Rodgers Show
- The Jimmy Dean Show
- Jimmy Kimmel Live!
- Jimmy Neutron
- The Jimmy Stewart Show
- Jimmy Two-Shoes
- The Jim Nabors Hour
- The Jinx

=== JO ===
- Jo (France)
- Joanie Loves Chachi
- Joan of Arcadia
- Jóban Rosszban
- Joanie Loves Chachi
- Joe 90 (UK)
- Joe & Valerie
- Joe Millionaire
- Joe Pera Talks With You
- The Joe Schmo Show
- Joey
- John Adams
- John McLaughlin's One On One
- Johnny and the Sprites
- Johnny Bravo
- The Johnny Cash Show
- Johnny Staccato
- Johnny Test
- Joint Account (UK)
- JoJo's Bizarre Adventure
- JoJo's Circus
- The Joker's Wild
- Joking Apart
- Jonas
- Jonas Brothers: Living the Dream
- Jonathan Creek
- Jonny Briggs
- Jonny Quest
- Joshua Jones
- Josie and the Pussycats
- The Journey of Allen Strange
- Journeyman
- Jo Frost: Nanny On Tour
- Joy Behar: Say Anything!
- The Joy of Painting

=== JU ===
- Jubilee USA
- Judd, for the Defense
- The Judds
- Judge Alex
- Judge Joe Brown
- Judge John Deed
- Judge Judy
- Judge Mathis
- Judge Rinder
- Judging Amy
- Juke Box Jury
- Juken Sentai Gekiranger
- Julia (1968)
- Julia (2022)
- Julie
- Julie's Greenroom
- Juliet Bravo (British)
- Julius Jr.
- Jumanji
- The Jump (British)
- The Jungle Book
- The Jungle Bunch
- Jungle Cubs
- Jungle Junction
- Junior Bake Off (UK)
- Junior Television Club
- Junkyard Wars
- Jurassic World Camp Cretaceous
- The Jury
- Just Beyond
- Just Good Friends (UK)
- Just In
- Just Jordan
- Just Kidding
- Just for Laughs
- Just for Laughs Gags
- Just Roll With It
- Just Shoot Me!
- Just the Ten of Us
- Just William (1976)
- Just William (1994)
- Justice (1971)
- Justice (2006)
- Justice League
- Justice League Action
- Justice League Unlimited
- Justified
- Justin Time

Previous: List of television programs: H Next: List of television programs: K-L
