= List of television programs: T =

Alphabetically indexed lists of television programs
0–9	A	B	C	D	E	F	G	H	I–J
K–L	M	N	O	P	Q–R	S	T	U–V–W	X–Y–Z

This is an alphabetical list of television program articles (or sections within articles about television programs). Spaces and special characters are ignored. This list covers television programs whose first letter (excluding "the") of the title is T.

== T ==
=== TA ===
- The Tab Hunter Show
- Table for 3
- Table for 12
- Taboo (UK)
- Taboo (US)
- Tagesschau (Germany)
- Taggart (Scotland)
- Taina
- Tak and the Power of Juju
- Take Two
- Taken (miniseries)
- Taken (NBC)
- Take On the Twisters (UK)
- Takeshi's Castle (Japan)
- Take the High Road
- Take This House and Sell It
- Take Two with Phineas and Ferb
- Takin' Over the Asylum
- Talent Varieties
- Tales from the Crypt
- Tales from the Cryptkeeper
- Tales from the Darkside
- Tales From Fat Tulip's Garden
- Tales of Little Women (Japan)
- Tales of Tomorrow
- Tales of the Teenage Mutant Ninja Turtles
- Tales of the Unexpected
- Tales of the Walking Dead
- Tales of Wells Fargo
- TaleSpin
- Talia in the Kitchen
- The Talk
- Talk Soup
- Talkback Live
- Talking Bad
- Talking Dead
- Talking Movies
- Tallship Chronicles
- Tamagotchi!
- Tamra's OC Wedding
- Tamron Hall
- Tangled: The Series
- Tanisha Gets Married
- Tanked
- Taratabong the World of the Meloditties
- Tarzan and the Super 7
- The Tarzan/Lone Ranger Adventure Hour
- Tarzan, Lord of the Jungle
- Tate
- Tattletales
- The Tattooist of Auschwitz
- Taxi
- Tayo the Little Bus

=== TE ===
- A Teacher
- Teachers (UK)
- Teachers (US) (2006)
- Teachers (US) (2016)
- Teacher's Pet
- Team Galaxy
- Team Ninja Warrior
- Team Umizoomi
- Team Zenko Go
- Teamo Supremo
- The Ted Knight Show (1978)
- The Ted Knight Show (1986)
- Ted Lasso
- Teenage Mutant Ninja Turtles (1987)
- Teenage Mutant Ninja Turtles (2003)
- Teenage Mutant Ninja Turtles (2012)
- Teen Mom
- Teen Mom 2
- Teen Mom 3
- Teen Mom: The Next Chapter
- Teen Mom UK
- Teen Mom: Young and Pregnant
- Teen Mom: Young Moms Club
- Teen Titans
- Teen Titans Go!
- Teen Wolf (1986)
- Teen Wolf (2011)
- The Telebugs
- Ten 7 Aotearoa (formerly Police Ten 7, 2002–2023)
- Tenkai Knights
- Tenko and the Guardians of the Magic
- Telenovela
- Teletubbies
- Tell Me You Love Me
- Tell Me a Story
- Temperatures Rising
- Temptation Island
- Tenable
- Ten Days in the Valley
- Ten Dollar Dinners
- Tennessee Tuxedo and His Tales
- Teresa Checks In
- The Terminal List
- Terminator: The Sarah Connor Chronicles
- Terra Nova
- Terrahawks
- Terry and June
- Texaco Star Theater
- Texas
- Texas Country Reporter
- Texas Justice
- The Texas Wheelers
- Texas Women
- #Text Me When You Get Home

=== TH ===
- Thank Your Lucky Stars
- That '70s Show
- That '80s Show
- That '90s Show
- That Damn Michael Che
- That Girl
- That Girl Lay Lay
- That's Incredible!
- That's Life (1968)
- That's Life (1998)
- That's Life (2000)
- That's My Boy (US)
- That's My Boy (UK)
- That's My Bush!
- That's My Dog
- That's My Jam
- That's My Mama
- That's So Raven
- That's So Weird! (Canada)
- That Was the Week That Was
- Then Came Bronson
- Then and Now with Andy Cohen
- There Goes the Motherhood
- The Leftovers
- The Q Cut
- The Replacements (TV series)
- The Voice
- They Came from Outer Space
- The Thick of It (UK)
- Thicker than Water (1973)
- Thicker Than Water (2013)
- Thierry La Fronde
- Think Fast (ABC)
- Think Fast (Nickelodeon)
- Third Watch
- Thirtysomething
- This American Life
- This Hour Has 22 Minutes
- This Is Life with Lisa Ling
- This Is Us
- This Is Your Day
- This Is Your Life
- This Old House
- This Morning
- This Week
- Thomas and Friends
- A Thousand Blows
- Three Busy Debras
- Three Chords from the Truth (Canada)
- Three Delivery
- Three Rivers
- Three's a Crowd (sitcom)
- Three's a Crowd (game show)
- Three's Company
- The Three Friends and Jerry
- Three Up, Two Down
- Threshold
- Thriller (UK)
- Thriller (US)
- Thronecast (UK)
- Throwdown! with Bobby Flay
- Thundarr The Barbarian
- Thunderbirds
- Thunderbirds 2086 (Japan)
- ThunderCats (1985)
- ThunderCats (2011)
- ThunderCats Roar
- The Board
- The Thundermans
- The Thundermans Undercover
- Thursday Night Football

=== TI ===
- Tia & Tamera
- The Tick
- Tickety Toc
- Tic-Tac-Dough
- Tikkabilla
- Tik Tak
- 'Til Death
- Till Death Us Do Part
- Tim and Eric Nite Live!
- Tim and Eric Awesome Show, Great Job!
- The Tim Conway Comedy Hour
- Timber Creek Lodge
- Time After Time (UK)
- Time After Time (US)
- Timeblazers
- Timecop
- Timeless
- Time of Your Life
- Time Signs
- Timeslip
- Time Squad
- Time Team
- Time Trax
- The Time Tunnel
- Timbalo
- Time Warp Trio
- Time Was
- Timmy Time (UK)
- Timothy Goes To School
- The Tiny Chef Show
- Tiny Toon Adventures
- Tipping Point
- Tires
- Tiswas
- The Titan Games
- Titan Maximum
- Titans
- Tittybangbang
- Titus

=== TJ ===
- T. J. Hooker

=== TK ===
- TKO: Total Knock Out

=== TM ===
- TMZ

=== TN ===
- TNA British Boot Camp (UK)
- TNA Reaction
- TNA Today

=== TO ===
- To Be Hero (Japan, 2016)
- Today on the Farm
- Today (Ireland)
- Today (US)
- Today's Special
- Toddlers & Tiaras
- ToddWorld
- The Tofus
- Tokusou Sentai Dekaranger
- Tokyo Tarareba Musume (Japan, 2017)
- Tom & Jerry Kids
- Tom and Jerry
- The Tom and Jerry Show (1975)
- The Tom and Jerry Show (2014)
- Tom and Jerry Tales
- Tom Brown's Schooldays
- Tom Corbett, Space Cadet
- Tom, Dick and Mary
- The Tom Ewell Show
- Tom Goes to the Mayor
- Toma
- Tomica Kizuna Mode Combine Earth Granner
- The Tomorrow People (UK)
- The Tomorrow People (US)
- The Tomorrow Show
- Tomorrow's World (UK)
- Tom's Midnight Garden (UK) (1974)
- Tom's Midnight Garden (UK) (1989)
- Tonight (UK)
- The Tonight Show
  - Tonight Starring Jack Paar
  - Tonight Starring Steve Allen
  - The Tonight Show Starring Jimmy Fallon
  - The Tonight Show Starring Johnny Carson
  - The Tonight Show with Conan O'Brien
  - The Tonight Show with Jay Leno
- To Nisi (Greece)
- Tony Bennett at the Talk of the Town (UK, 1972)
- The Tony Danza Show (1997)
- The Tony Danza Show (2004)
- Too Close to Home
- Too Cute
- Too Hot to Handle
- Tool Academy
- Toon In with Me
- Tooned In
- ToonMarty
- Toonsylvania
- Top 20 Countdown
- Top Cat
- Top Chef
- Top Chef Duels
- Top Chef Junior
- Top Chef Masters
- Top Cops
- Top Design
- Top Elf
- Top Gear (1977)
- Top Gear (2002)
- Top Model (Poland)
- Top of the Pops (UK)
- Top Wing (Canada)
- Topper
- Toopy and Binoo
- Torchwood
- Torchy the Battery Boy (UK)
- Tori & Dean: Cabin Fever
- Tori & Dean: Home Sweet Hollywood
- Tori & Dean: sTORIbook Weddings
- To Rome With Love
- The Tortellis
- Tosh.0
- Total Bellas
- Total Divas
- Total Drama (Canada)
- Total Drama Action
- Total Drama All-Stars and Pahkitew Island
- Total Drama Island
- Total DramaRama (Canada)
- Total Drama: Revenge of the Island
- Total Drama World Tour
- Totally Spies
- Total Panic
- Total Request Live
- Total Wipeout
- To Tell the Truth
- To the Manor Born (BBC Sitcom)
- T.O.T.S.
- Tots TV
- Touch
- Touched by an Angel
- Touching Evil
- Tough Crowd with Colin Quinn
- Tour of Duty
- Tour Group
- Tower Prep
- A Town Without Seasons
- The Toy Box
- The Toy Castle
- Toy Story Toons
- The Toys That Built America
- The Toys That Made Us

=== TR ===
- Tracey McBean
- The Tracey Ullman Show
- Tracey Ullman's Show (UK)
- Trading Spaces
- Trading Spaces: Boys vs. Girls
- Trading Spouses
- The Traffickers (UK)
- Trailer Park Boys
- Training Day
- Transformers
- Transformers: Animated
- Transformers: Armada
- Transformers - Beast Machines
- Transformers: Beast Wars
- Transformers: Cybertron
- Transformers: Cyberverse
- Transformers: EarthSpark
- Transformers: Energon
- Transformers: Rescue Bots
- Transformers: Rescue Bots Academy
- Transformers: Prime
- Transformers: Robots in Disguise
- Transformers: Robots in Disguise (2015)
- Transplant
- Travel for Your Health
- Tranzor Z
- Trapper John, M.D.
- Trauma
- Trauma: Life in the E.R.
- The Travel Show (UK)
- Tracker
- Treasure Hunt
- Tree Fu Tom (UK)
- Treme
- Trial and Error (1988)
- Trial & Error (2017)
- Tribes and Empires: Storm of Prophecy (China)
- Trick My Truck
- Trick My Trucker
- Trigun
- Trinity Blood
- Triple Nine
- Tripping the Rift (Canada)
- Trivia Track
- Trivia Trap
- Trivial Pursuit (UK)
- Trivial Pursuit (US)
- Trivial Pursuit: America Plays
- Trollhunters
- Trolls: The Beat Goes On!
- Trollz
- The Troop
- Trophy Wife
- Troppo (Australia)
- Tron: Uprising
- Trot Lovers (South Korea)
- The Troubleshooters
- Tru Calling
- True and the Rainbow Kingdom
- Truth Be Told (2015)
- Truth Be Told (2019)
- True Blood
- True Detective
- True Jackson: VP
- True Life
- True Tori
- Trumpton (BBC)
- Truth or Consequences
- Truth & Iliza
- TruTV Presents: World's Dumbest...
- Try Knights

=== TU ===
- TUGS
- Tucker Carlson Tonight
- Tuckerville
- The Tudors
- Tuesday Night Titans
- T.U.F.F. Puppy
- Turbo Fast
- Turkey Television
- Turnabout
- Turn A Gundam
- Tupu
- Turn-On

=== TW ===
- Tweenies (UK)
- The Twentieth Century (1957–1970)
- Twenty-One
- Twenty Questions
- Twice in a Lifetime
- The Twilight Zone (1959)
- The Twilight Zone (1985)
- The Twilight Zone (2002)
- The Twilight Zone (2019)
- The Twins of Destiny
- The Twisted Tales of Felix the Cat
- The Twisted Timeline of Sammy & Raj
- The Twisted Whiskers Show
- Twisted
- Twin Peaks
- Two and a Half Men
- Two for the Money
- Two Guys and a Girl
- Two of a Kind (UK)
- Two of a Kind (US)
- Two Pints of Lager and a Packet of Crisps (UK)
- The Two Ronnies (UK)

=== TV ===
- TV 101
- TV Colosso
- TV Fama
- TV Funhouse
- TV Gospel Time
- TV Heaven, Telly Hell
- TV We Love
- TV's Bloopers & Practical Jokes
- TV's Naughtiest Blunders

=== TY ===
- Tyler Perry's For Better or Worse
- Tyler Perry's House of Payne
- Tyler Perry's Ruthless
- Tyler Perry's The Oval
- Tyler Perry's Young Dylan
- The Tyra Banks Show
- Tyrant

Previous: List of television programs: T Next: List of television programs: U-V-W
