= List of television programs: N =

This list covers television programs whose first letter (excluding "the") of the title is N.

Alphabetically indexed lists of television programs
0-9	A	B	C	D
E	F	G	H	I–J
K–L	M	N	O	P
Q–R	S	T	U–V–W	X–Y–Z

This is an alphabetical list of television program articles (or sections within articles about television programs). Spaces and special characters are ignored.

== N ==
=== NA ===
- Naked and Afraid
- Naked and Afraid of Love
- The Naked Brothers Band
- Naked City
- Naked Josh
- The Naked Truth
- The Name of the Game
- Name That Tune
- The Name's the Same
- Nancy
- The Nancy Drew Mysteries
- Nancy Grace
- Nate & Jeremiah by Design
- Nathan for You
- National Bingo Night (US)
- National Geographic Explorer
- National Vocabulary Championship
- Naturally, Sadie (Canada)
- Nature Cat
- The Nature of Things
- Navy Log

=== NB ===
- The NBC Mystery Movie
- NBC Nightly News
- NBC Sunday Night Football

=== NC ===
- NCIS
  - NCIS
  - NCIS: Los Angeles
  - NCIS: New Orleans
  - NCIS: Hawai'i

=== NE ===
- Ned and Stacey
- Ned's Declassified School Survival Guide
- Ned's Newt
- Needles and Pins
- The Neighborhood
- Neighbours
- Nella the Princess Knight
- Neon Genesis Evangelion
- Neon Joe: Werewolf Hunter
- Neon Rider (Canada)
- Neo Yokio
- Nerds and Monsters
- Never Have I Ever
- The Nevers
- The New Adventures of He-Man
- The New Adventures of Jonny Quest
- The New Adventures of the Lone Ranger
- The New Adventures of Nanoboy
- The New Adventures of Old Christine
- The New Adventures of Pinocchio
- The New Adventures of Winnie the Pooh
- The New Adventures of Zorro (1981)
- The New Adventures of Zorro (1997)
- New Amsterdam (2008)
- New Amsterdam (2018)
- The New Avengers
- The New Breed
- New Captain Scarlet
- The New Celebrity Apprentice
- The New Dick Van Dyke Show
- New Game!
- New Girl
- The New Normal
- The New Odd Couple
- Newton's Cradle
- The New Perry Mason
- The New Phil Silvers Show
- The New Price Is Right
- The New Scooby-Doo Movies
- The New Scooby and Scrappy-Doo Show
- The New Show
- The New Statesman
- New Tricks (British)
- New Warriors
- The New Yogi Bear Show
- New York Goes to Hollywood
- New York Goes to Work
- New York Undercover
- New Zoo Revue
- Newhart
- Newport Harbor: The Real Orange County
- The NewsHour with Jim Lehrer
- Newsnight (BBC)
- NewsRadio
- The Newsroom
- The Newlywed Game
- Newlyweds: The First Year
- Newlyweds: Nick and Jessica
- Nexo Knights
- Next
- Next Great Baker
- The Next Iron Chef
- Next of Kin (UK)
- The Next Star (Canada)
- The Next Step

=== NF ===
- NFL AM
- NFL on CBS
- NFL Cheerleader Playoffs
- NFL on TNT

=== NI ===
- Nick Arcade
- The Nick Cannon Show
- Nick Jr. Face
- Nick News
- Nickelodeon Guts
- Nickelodeon Robot Wars
- Nicky, Ricky, Dicky & Dawn
- Nightcap (1953) (Canada)
- Nightcap (1963) (Canada)
- Nightcap (2016) (US)
- Night Court (1984)
- Night Court (2023)
- Night Gallery
- Night Heat
- Nightlife
- Nightline
- Nightly Pop
- The Night Manager (UK)
- Nightmare Ned
- Nightmares & Dreamscapes: From the Stories of Stephen King
- The Night Agent
- The Night Shift
- Night Stalker
- Night Stand with Dick Dietrick
- Night Visions
- Nightwatch with Steve Scott
- Ni Hao, Kai-Lan
- Nikita
- Nikki
- Nikki & Sara Live
- Niloya
- Nina's World
- Nine for IX
- The Nine Lives of Chloe King
- Ninja Turtles: The Next Mutation
- Ninjago: Masters of Spinjitzu
- The Nine
- Nine to Five
- Ninety-Five
- Nineteen Eighty-Four
- The Nineties
- Nip/Tuck
- Nitro Circus
- Nitro Circus Live

=== NO ===
- No Good Nick
- The No.1 Ladies Detective Agency
- Noah (Philippines)
- Noah and Saskia
- Noah Knows Best
- Nobody's Watching
- Noddy (US/Canada)
- Noddy, Toyland Detective
- Noggin the Nog (British)
- Norby
- The Norm Show
- Normal People
- Norman Picklestripes
- North and South
- North Shore
- Northern Exposure
- NOS Journaal
- Nostalgia Critic (Web series)
- Not Going Out
- Not Necessarily the News
- No Ordinary Family
- Not the Nine O'Clock News
- Not Safe with Nikki Glaser
- The Not-Too-Late Show with Elmo
- Notes from the Underbelly
- Nothing Sacred
- Noticentro 4
- Notorious (2004)
- Notorious (2016)
- Nova (Netherlands)
- Nova (U.S.A.)
- Novoland: The Castle in the Sky (China)
- Now and Again
- Now You See It
- Nowhere Boys (Australia)
- Nowhere Man

=== NT ===
- NTSF:SD:SUV::

=== NU ===
- Number 96
- Numberblocks
- Numberjacks
- Number One Surprise
- Number Please
- Numb3rs
- Numbertime
- Numb Chucks (Canada)
- Nummer 28 (Dutch)
- The Numtums
- Nurse Jackie
- The Nurses
- Nurses
- Nutri Ventures
- The Nutshack

=== NX ===
- NXT UK

=== NY ===
- Nyanko Days (TBA, Japan)
- NYC 22
- NY Ink
- NY Med
- N.Y.P.D.
- NYPD Blue

Previous: List of television programs: M Next: List of television programs: O
