= List of television programs: U–V–W =

Alphabetically indexed lists of television programs
| 0–9 | A | B | C | D | E | F | G | H | I–J |
| K–L | M | N | O | P | Q–R | S | T | U–V–W | X–Y–Z |

This is an alphabetical list of television program articles (or sections within articles about television programs). Spaces and special characters are ignored. This list covers television programs whose first letter (excluding "the") of the title are U, V, and W.

== U ==
=== UF ===
- UFC Tonight
- UFC Ultimate Insider

=== UG ===
- Ugly Americans
- Ugly Betty

=== UH ===
- Uh Oh!

=== UL ===
- Ultimate Blackjack Tour
- Ultimate Book of Spells
- Ultimate Cake Off
- The Ultimate Coyote Ugly Search
- The Ultimate Fighter
- Ultimate Force
- The Ultimate Merger
- Ultimate Recipe Showdown
- Ultimate Spider-Man
- Ultimate Tag
- Ulysses 31
- Ultraman
- Ultraman Orb
- Ultra Violet & Black Scorpion

=== UM ===
- The Umbrella Academy

=== UN ===
- Unbelievable
- Unbreakable Kimmy Schmidt
- Uncle Buck (1990)
- Uncle Buck (2016)
- Uncle Grandpa
- Uncle Max
- Uncommon Sense with Charlamagne
- Undateable
- The Undateables (UK)
- Undeclared
- Underbelly
- Undercover Boss
  - Undercover Boss (Canada)
  - Undercover Boss (UK)
  - Undercover Boss (US)
  - Undercover Boss Australia
  - Undercover Boss Israel
  - Undercover Boss Norge
- Undercover High (Canada)
- Undercover High (US)
- Underdog
- Undergrads
- Underground
- Underground Ernie
- Under the Bridge
- Under the Dome
- Under the Gunn
- Unexpected
- Unfabulous
- Unfiltered with Renee Young
- Unhappily Ever After
- The Unicorn
- Unikitty!
- The Unit
- United States of Al
- United States of Tara
- United We Fall
- Universal Basic Guys
- Unleashed
- Unnatural History
- Unreal
- Unsolved (Scotland)
- Unsolved (US)
- Unsolved: The Boy Who Disappeared (UK)
- Unsolved Mysteries
- Untalkative Bunny
- Until Tomorrow
- Untold
- Untold Stories of the E.R.
- The Untouchables
- Untying the Knot

=== UP ===
- Upload
- Upper Middle Bogan
- The Upside Down Show
- Upstairs, Downstairs (1971)
- Upstairs, Downstairs (2010)
- U to U

=== UR ===
- Urawa no Usagi-chan
- Urban Vermin
- Urusei Yatsura
- The URL with Phred Show

=== UT ===
- Utopia (British TV series), a 2013 British drama series
- Utopia (Australian TV series), a 2014– Australian comedy series
- Utopia (Dutch reality TV series), a 2014– Dutch reality series
  - Utopia (2014 American TV series), a 2014 American reality series based on the Dutch series
  - Ütopya, a 2014–15 Turkish reality series based on the Dutch series
- Utopia (2020 TV series), an American adaption of the 2013 British drama series of the same name

== V ==
=== V ===
- V (1983 miniseries)
- V (1984 miniseries)
- V (1984)
- V (2009)

=== VA ===
- The Vacant Lot
- The Valleys (UK)
- Való Világ (Hungary)
- The Vampire Diaries
- Vampire High
- Vampire Academy
- Vampirina
- Vanderpump Rules
- Vanderpump Rules After Show
- Vanderpump Rules: Jax & Brittany Take Kentucky
- Van Der Valk
- Van Der Valk (2020 reboot)
- Van Helsing
- Variety Studio: Actors on Actors

=== VE ===
- Vecinos (Mexico)
- Veep
- Vegas (1978)
- Vegas (2012)
- VeggieTales
- The Veggie Tales Show
- The Veil
- Velma
- The Venture Bros.
- Vera
- The Verdict (BBC)
- Veronica Mars
- Veronica's Closet
- A Very British Murder with Lucy Worsley
- Very Cavallari

=== VG ===
- V Graham Norton

=== VH ===
- VH1's Legends

=== VI ===
- Vic the Viking
- Vicar of Dibley
- Victoria (Columbia)
- Victoria (UK)
- Victor and Valentino
- Victorious
- Vida the Vet
- Video Power
- The View
- Viewpoint
- Viking: The Ultimate Obstacle Course (Japan)
- Vikings (BBC)
- Vikings (Canada and Ireland)
- Vikings: Valhalla
- The Village
- Villainous
- The Villains of Valley View
- Violetta (Argentina)
- Viper
- The Virginian
- Virgin River (BBC)
- The Visit (BBC)
- Visit to Be Treated
- Viva La Bam
- Viva Piñata
- Viva Valdez
- Vixen

=== VO ===
- The Voice
  - The Voice (US)
- Voltron
- Voltron: Defender of the Universe
- Voltron: Legendary Defender
- Voyage to the Bottom of the Sea

=== VR ===
- VR.5

== W ==
=== WA ===
- Wabbit
- Wacky Races
- Waco
- Wagon Train
- WAGS
- WAGS Atlanta
- WAGS Miami
- WAG Nation (Australia)
- Wahlburgers
- Wait Till Your Father Gets Home
- Walker, Texas Ranger
- Walk the Prank
- The Wall (UK)
- The Wall (US game show)
- Wall of Fame (UK game show)
- The Wallace and Ladmo Show
- Wallykazam!
- The Walking Dead
- The Walking Dead: Dead City
- The Walking Dead: The Ones Who Live
- The Walking Dead: Daryl Dixon
- The Walter Winchell Show
- The Walter Winchell Show (variety)
- The Waltons
- Wanda and the Alien
- WandaVision
- Wanda at Large
- Wander Over Yonder
- Wanna Play?
- Wanted: Dead or Alive
- The War at Home
- Warehouse 13
- War of the Worlds
- War Planets
- Warped!
- Warsaw Shore (Poland)
- Warship
- Washington Week
- Watchdog (UK)
- Watching Ellie
- Watchmen
- Watch Mr. Wizard
- Watch What Happens Live with Andy Cohen
- Waterloo Road
- Watership Down
- The Waverly Wonders
- The Way of the Master
- The Wayans Bros.
- Waynehead
- Wayside

=== WC ===
- WCW Monday Nitro
- WCW Saturday Night
- WCW Thunder

=== WE ===
- We Are Family
- We Are the Champions (UK)
- We Have Issues
- The Weakest Link (Australia)
- The Weakest Link (UK)
- Weakest Link (US)
- Weaponology
- The Web
- The Web
- Webster
- Wednesday
- Wednesday Night Baseball
- Wee 3 (Canada)
- Weeds
- The Weekenders
- Weekend Live
- Weinerville
- The Weird Al Show
- Weird Science
- Weird or What?
- Welcome Back, Kotter
- Welcome Freshmen
- Welcome to Flatch
- Welcome to Myrtle Manor
- Welcome to the Neighborhood
- Welcome to Pooh Corner
- Welcome to Sweetie Pie's
- Welcome to the Wayne
- Wendell & Vinnie
- The Wendy Williams Show
- Weirdest Games Ever
- West 57th
- West Coast Wrestling Connection
- West Point Story
- The West Wing
- Westworld
- We Bare Bears

=== WH ===
- Whammy! The All-New Press Your Luck
- What About Brian
- What About Mimi?
- What a Cartoon!
- Whatever Happened to Robot Jones?
- What Happens at The Abbey
- What If...
- What If?
- What I Like About You
- What Not to Wear (UK)
- What Not to Wear (US)
- What We Do in the Shadows
- What Would Ryan Lochte Do?
- What Would You Do? (1991 game show)
- What Would You Do? (2008)
- What's Alan Watching?
- What's Happening!!
- What's My Line?
- What's New, Scooby-Doo?
- What the Papers Say
- What's the Story?
- What's with Andy?
- Wheeler Dealers
- Wheel of Fortune
- Wheel of Fortune 2000
- Wheel Squad (France)
- When the Boat Comes In (UK)
- When Calls the Heart
- When Games Attack
- When They See Us
- When Things Were Rotten
- When We Rise
- Where Are They Now? (Australia)
- Where Are They Now? (Hong Kong)
- Where Are They Now? (US)
- Where the Heart Is
- Where in the World Is Carmen Sandiego?
- Where Is Wendy Williams?
- Where's Chicky?
- Where's Wally?
- While You Were Out
- Whiplash
- Whirlybirds
- Whiskey Cavalier
- The Whispers
- Whistleblower
- Whistler
- White Collar
- The White Princess
- The White Queen (UK)
- The White Shadow
- The Whitest Kids U' Know
- Whitney
- Whiz Kids
- Who Dares Wins (Australia)
- Who Dares Wins (UK)
- Who Is America?
- Who's the Boss?
- Who's Watching the Kids?
- Whose Line Is It Anyway? (UK)
- Whose Line Is It Anyway? (US)
- Who Do You Think You Are? (Australia)
- Who Do You Think You Are? (Canada)
- Who Do You Think You Are? (Ireland)
- Who Do You Think You Are? (UK)
- Who Do You Think You Are? (US)
- Who Wants to Be a Millionaire?
  - Who Wants to Be a Millionaire? (Australia)
  - Who Wants to Be a Millionaire? (UK)
  - Who Wants to Be a Millionaire? (US)
- Who Wants to Be a Superhero?
- Who Wants to Be a Super Millionaire
- Who Wants to Marry a Multi-Millionaire?
- Who Wants to Marry My Dad?
- The Who, What, or Where Game
- Why Not? with Shania Twain

=== WI ===
- Wibbly Pig
- Wicked Attraction
- Wicked City
- Wicked Science
- Wicked Tuna
- Wife Swap (UK)
- Wife Swap (US)
- The Wild Adventures of Blinky Bill
- Wildboyz
- Wild Card
- Wild & Crazy Kids
- Wildfire
- Wild Grinders
- Wild Kingdom
- Wild Kratts
- Wild Oats
- Wild On!
- Wild 'n Out
- The Wild Thornberrys
- The Wild Wild West
- The Wilds
- Wilfred (AU)
- Wilfred (US)
- Will and Dewitt
- Will and Grace
- Willo the Wisp (British)
- Willa's Wild Life
- Will Work for Food
- Willy
- Wimzie's House
- Win Ben Stein's Money
- The Wind in the Willows: (1984-1990)
- Window on Main Street
- Wingin' It
- Wings (US)
- Wings (UK)
- Win, Lose or Draw
- Winner Take All
- Winning Streak
- Winsanity
- Winter Break: Hunter Mountain
- WinTuition
- Winx Club
- Wipeout (1988)
- Wipeout (2008)
- The Wire
- Wire in the Blood
- Wisdom of the Crowd
- Wiseguy
- Wishfart
- Wish Kid
- W.I.T.C.H.
- Witchblade
- Witches of East End
- With This Ring
- Without a Trace
- Without Prejudice?
- WITS Academy
- Wizards
- Wizards and Warriors
- Wizards of Waverly Place
- The Wizard
- The Wizard of Oz

=== WK ===
- WKRP in Cincinnati

=== WO ===
- Wok with Yan
- Wolverine
- Wolverine and the X-Men
- The Wombles (1973) (UK)
- The Wombles (1996) (UK)
- Women's Murder Club
- Wonderfalls
- Wonder Pets!
- Wonder Showzen
- The Wonderful World of Disney
- The Wonderful World of Mickey Mouse
- Wonder Woman
- The Wonder Years
- The Woodentops (UK)
- The Woodlanders
- Work Out
- Work Out New York
- Work It Out Wombats!
- WordGirl
- WordWorld
- Work It
- Workaholics
- Working
- Working Class
- Working Girl
- Workin' Moms
- World Class Cuisine
- World of Dance
- World News Now
- World of Quest
- World of Sport (UK)
- Woodlings (Denmark)
- World Theatre (UK)
- World of Winx (Italy)
- The World According to Jeff Goldblum
- The World According to Paris
- World Blackjack Tour
- World Series of Blackjack
- World Trigger
- The World's Best
- World's Dumbest Criminals
- World's Funniest Videos
- World's Most Amazing Videos
- The World's Strictest Parents
- World's Wildest Police Videos
- Worst Bakers in America
- Worst Cooks in America
- Worst Games Ever
- The Worst Witch
- Wow! Wow! Wubbzy!

=== WR ===
- Wrecked
- Wrestling Society X
- The Wright Stuff
- The Wrong Mans

=== WU ===
- The Wuzzles

=== WW ===
- WWE 24
- WWE 205 Live
- WWE Afterburn
- WWE Backstage
- WWE Bottom Line
- WWE Breaking Ground
- WWE Bring It to the Table
- WWE Diva Search
- WWE ECW
- WWE Experience
- WWE Free for All
- WWE Heat
- WWE Legends' House
- WWE Main Event
- WWE Mixed Match Challenge
- WWE NXT
- WWE NXT Level Up
- WWE Raw
- WWE Raw Talk
- WWE Ride Along
- WWE Saturday Morning Slam
- WWE Slam City
- WWE SmackDown
- WWE Superstar Ink
- WWE Superstars
- WWE Talking Smack
- WWE Tough Enough
- WWE Tribute to the Troops
- WWE Velocity
- WWE Vintage
- WWE Wal3ooha (Middle East)
- WWE Worlds Collide
- WWE's Most Wanted Treasures
- WWF Jakked/Metal
- WWF The Main Event
- WWF Prime Time Wrestling
- WWF Shotgun Saturday Night
- WWF Superstars of Wrestling

=== WY ===
- Wycliffe

Previous: List of television programs: T Next: List of television programs: X-Y-Z
