= List of television programs: P =

Alphabetically indexed lists of television programs
0–9	A	B	C	D	E	F	G	H	I–J
K–L	M	N	O	P	Q–R	S	T	U–V–W	X–Y–Z

This is an alphabetical list of television program articles (or sections within articles about television programs). Spaces and special characters are ignored. This list covers television programs whose first letter (excluding "the") of the title is P.

== P ==
=== PA ===
- The Pacific
- Pacific Blue
- Pacific Drive (also known as Pacific Beach)
- Packages from Planet X
- Packed to the Rafters
- Pac-Man
- Pac-Man and the Ghostly Adventures
- Page to Screen
- Painkiller Jane
- Pair of Kings
- Pan Am
- Panorama
- Pantomime Quiz
- Panty & Stocking with Garterbelt (Japan)
- The Paper
- The Paper Chase
- Paper Moon
- Paprika
- Paradise
- The Paradise (2012)
- Paradise Hotel
- Paradise Run
- Paranormal Challenge
- Paranormal Lockdown
- Paradise PD
- Paranormal State
- Paranormal Witness
- Pardon the Interruption
- The Parent Game
- The Parent 'Hood
- Parental Control
- Parenthood (1990)
- Parenthood (2010)
- Paris enquêtes criminelles (France)
- Paris Hilton's British Best Friend
- Paris Hilton's Dubai BFF
- Paris Hilton's My New BFF
- Parish
- Parker Lewis Can't Lose
- The Parkers
- Parks and Recreation
- The Partridge Family
- Partridge Family 2200 A.D.
- Party at Tiffany's
- Party Down
- Party Down South
- Party Line with The Hearty Boys
- Party of Five (1994)
- Party of Five (2020)
- Party On
- Pasadena
- The Passage
- Passions
- Pass the Buck (Australia)
- Pass the Buck (US)
- Password
- Password Plus
- The Patty Duke Show
- The Paul Lynde Show
- Pat & Mat
- Pat et Stanley
- The Patrick Star Show
- Paul Murray Live (Australia)
- Paul Sand in Friends and Lovers
- Paula's Home Cooking
- Pauly
- Paul's Puppets
- The Pauly D Project
- Pawn Stars
- Pawn Stars Australia
- Pawn Stars UK
- Paw Patrol

=== PB ===
- PBS News Hour

=== PE ===
- Peaky Blinders (UK)
- Peanuts (2014)
- Pearlie
- Peacemaker
- Pearson
- The Pebbles and Bamm-Bamm Show
- Pecola
- Peep Show (UK)
- Peep and the Big Wide World
- Pee-wee's Playhouse
- Peg + Cat
- Pelswick
- Pen15
- The Penguins of Madagascar
- Penn Zero: Part-Time Hero
- Penny Crayon
- Penny Dreadful
- Pennyworth: The Origin of Batman’s Butler
- Pensacola: Wings of Gold
- People Are Funny
- People Like Us
- The People's Couch
- The People's Court
- Peppa Pig
- Pepee
- Pepper Ann
- Pepper Dennis
- Perfect Couples
- Perfect Hair Forever
- Perfect Harmony
- Perfect Strangers
- The Perry Como Show
- Perry Mason (1957)
- Perry Mason (2020)
- Person to Person
- Person of Interest
- Persons Unknown
- The Persuaders!
- Perversions of Science
- Pet Alien
- Peter Gunn
- Peter Loves Mary
- Peter Rabbit (UK)
- Petrocelli
- Petticoat Junction
- Peyton Place

=== PH ===
- Phantasy Star Online 2: Episode Oracle
- The Phil Donahue Show
- Philly
- Phil of the Future
- The Phil Silvers Show
- Phyllis
- Phineas and Ferb
- Phoenix
- Phred on Your Head Show

=== PI ===
- Picket Fences
- Pickler & Ben
- Pie in the Sky (British)
- Piers Morgan Live
- Pig Goat Banana Cricket
- Pigeon Boy
- Piggy Tales
- Pimp My Ride
- Pingu
- The Pillars of the Earth
- Pinkalicious & Peterrific
- The Pink Panther Show
- Pinky and the Brain
- Pinky Dinky Doo
- PINY: Institute of New York
- Pinwheel
- Pip Ahoy!
- Pirate Islands
- Pirate Master
- The Pirates of Dark Water
- Pit Bulls & Parolees
- The Pitch
- Pitch
- PitchMen
- Pitch Slapped
- The Pitt
- The Pitts
- Pivoting
- Pixel Pinkie
- Pixie and Dixie and Mr. Jinks

=== PJ ===
- PJ Masks
- The PJs

=== PK ===
- P. King Duckling

=== PL ===
- A Place to Call Home (Australia)
- Plain Jane
- Planet Earth (PBS, 1986)
- Planet Earth (BBC, 2006)
- Planet Sketch
- Planet Sheen
- Play Away (British children's TV)
- Playdays
- Playhouse 90
- Playing It Straight
- PlayMania
- Play School (Australian)
- Play School (New Zealand)
- Play School (UK)
- Play the Percentages
- Play with Me Sesame
- Play Your Cards Right
- Play Your Hunch
- The Player
- Please Don't Eat the Daisies
- Please, Sir
- Plim Plim (Argentina)
- Plonsters

=== PM ===
- PM Live (Ireland)
- PM Magazine

=== PO ===
- Pocoyo
- Pogles' Wood (British)
- Pointless (BBC)
- Point Pleasant
- Pokémon
- Pokémon Chronicles
- Poker Royale
- Poko
- Pole Position
- Police 24/7
- Police Academy
- Police Academy: The Series
- Police POV
- Police Squad!
- Police Story
- Police Woman
- Police Women of Broward County
- Police Women of Cincinnati
- Police Women of Dallas
- Police Women of Maricopa County
- Polly Pocket
- Pop Idol (UK)
- Poppa's House
- Poppee the Performer
- Poppets Town (Canada)
- Popples (1986)
- Popples (2015)
- Poppy Cat
- PopPixie (Italy)
- Police Women of Memphis
- Politically Incorrect
- Politicking with Larry King
- Polka Dot Door
- Polka Dot Shorts
- Poochini
- Pop! Goes the Country
- Pop of the Morning
- Popstars
- Popular
- Pop-Up Video
- Pororo the Little Penguin
- Porridge (British)
- Port Charles
- Portadas al Día (Venezuela)
- Portlandia
- Pose
- Postman Pat (SDS)
- Potatoes and Dragons
- Pound Puppies (1986)
- Pound Puppies (2010)
- Power
- Power of 10
- Powerless
- The Powerpuff Girls (1998)
- The Powerpuff Girls (2016)
- Powerpuff Girls Z (Japan)
- Power Players
- Power Rangers
  - Power Rangers Beast Morphers
  - Power Rangers Dino Charge
  - Power Rangers Dino Thunder
  - Power Rangers Jungle Fury
  - Power Rangers Lightspeed Rescue
  - Power Rangers Lost Galaxy
  - Power Rangers Megaforce
  - Power Rangers Mystic Force
  - Power Rangers Ninja Steel
  - Power Rangers Ninja Storm
  - Power Rangers Operation Overdrive
  - Power Rangers in Space
  - Power Rangers Samurai
  - Power Rangers S.P.D.
  - Power Rangers Time Force
  - Power Rangers Turbo
  - Power Rangers Wild Force
  - Power Rangers Zeo
- Powers (UK)
- Powers (US)
- The Powers of Matthew Star

=== PR ===
- The Practice
- Prank Patrol (Australia)
- Prank Patrol (Canada)
- Prank Patrol (UK)
- Pranked
- PrankStars
- Praise The Lord
- Preacher
- Preachers' Daughters
- The President Show
- Press Your Luck
- The Pretender
- Pretty Little Liars
- Pretty Little Liars: The Perfectionists
- Pretty Little Liars: Original Sin
- Pretty Little Mamas
- Pretty Wicked Moms
- Pretty Wild
- Prey (UK)
- Prey (US)
- The Price Is Right
  - The Price Is Right (US) (1956)
  - The Price Is Right (US) (1972–present)
  - The price is rght at night
  - the price is right million dollar spectacular
  - the price is right primetime special air force army coast graud marines navy
  - the price is right survivor special
  - the price is right big brother special
  - the price is right amazing race special
- Pride and Prejudice (1995)
- Primetime
- Primeval
- Primeval: New World
- Prime Minister and I (South Korea)
- Prime Suspect (UK)
- Prime Suspect (US)
- Prime Time (Ireland)
- The Prince
- Prince Caspian and The Voyage of the Dawn Treader (British series) (1989)
- The Princes of Malibu
- The Prince of Tennis
- Prison Break
- Prisoner
- Prisoners of Gravity
- Private Eyes
- Private Practice
- Privileged
- Producing Parker
- The Professionals (UK)
- Profiler
- The Profit
- Profit
- Programa do Ratinho (Brazil)
- Programa Silvio Santos (Brazil)
- Project G.e.e.K.e.R.
- Project Catwalk (Netherlands)
- Project Catwalk (UK)
- Project Mc2
- Project Runway
- Project Runway All Stars
- Project Runway: Junior
- Project Runway: Threads
- Project U.F.O.
- Promised Land
- Property Brothers
  - Property Brothers
- Property Virgins
- The Proposal
- Pro Sportsman No.1 (Japan)
- Proven Innocent
- Providence
- The Protectors (UK)
- Prototype This!
- The Proud Family

=== PS ===
- Psi Factor
- Psych
- The Psychiatrist
- Psycho-Pass

=== PU ===
- Puberty Blues
- Public Morals (1996)
- Public Morals (2015)
- Pucca (South Korea)
- Puffin Rock
- Pulp Comics
- The Punisher
- Punk'd
- Punky Brewster
- A Pup Named Scooby-Doo
- Pure Genius
- The Purge
- Pushing Daisies
- Pussycat Dolls Present
- Puppy Dog Pals
- Pupstruction

=== PV ===
- P-Valley

=== PY ===
- Pyramid (US)
- Pyramid (Australia)
- Pyramid Game
- PythagoraSwitch

Previous: List of television programs: O Next: List of television programs: Q-R
