= List of television programs: F =

Alphabetically indexed lists of television programs
0–9	A	B	C	D	E	F	G	H	I–J
K–L	M	N	O	P	Q–R	S	T	U–V–W	X–Y–Z

This is an alphabetical list of television program articles (or sections within articles about television programs). Spaces and special characters are ignored. This list covers television programs whose first letter (excluding "the") of the title is F.

== F ==
=== FA ===
- FABLife
- The Fabulous Life of...
- The Fabulous Sixties
- The Face Is Familiar
- The Facts of Life
- Face the Nation
- Face Off
- Faerie Tale Theatre
- Fair City
- The Fairly OddParents
- The Fairly OddParents: Fairly Odder
- The Fairly OddParents: A New Wish
- Fairy Tail
- Faking It (2000)
- Faking It (2014)
- Falcón
- The Falcon and the Winter Soldier
- Falcon Crest
- The Fall Guy
- Falling Skies
- Falling Water
- Fallout (2024)
- Fam
- Fame
- The Family (UK)
- Family
- Family Affair (1966)
- Family Affair (2002)
- Family Affairs
- Family Album
- Family Brainsurge
- Family Biz
- Family Challenge
- Family Feud
- A Family for Joe
- Family Fortunes
- Family Game Night
- Family Game Night Celebrity Edition
- The Family Genius
- Family Guy
- The Family Holvak
- The Family Law (Australia)
- Family Law (US)
- Family Matters
- The Family-Ness
- Family Reunion
- Family Ties
- Famous and Fearless (UK)
- Famous 5: On the Case
- The Famous Five
- Famous Food
- Famous in Love
- Famously Single
- Fanboy & Chum Chum
- Fancy Nancy
- Fantastic Four
- Fantastic Four: World's Greatest Heroes
- The Fantastic Journey
- Fantasmas
- Fantastic Max
- Fantasy Island
- Fargo
- Farmer Wants a Wife
- Farscape
- Fashionably Late with Rachel Zoe
- Fashion House
- Fashion Police
- Fashion Star
- The Fashion Show
- Fast Cars and Superstars: The Gillette Young Guns Celebrity Race
- Fast Forward
- The Fast Lane (Australia)
- Fast Layne
- Fast Money
- The Fast Show
- Fast Track (UK)
- Fastlane
- Fat Albert and the Cosby Kids
- Fat Guy Stuck in Internet
- Father Brown (1974)
- Father Brown (2013)
- Father Dowling Mysteries
- Fatherhood
- Father Knows Best
- Father Murphy
- Father of the Bride
- Father of the Pride
- Father Ted
- Fat March
- Fawlty Towers
- Fay

=== FB ===
- FBI
  - FBI
  - FBI: International
  - FBI: Most Wanted
- The F.B.I.
- The FBI Files
- FBoy Island

=== FC ===
- FCW

=== FE ===
- Fear
- Fear Factor
- Fear Itself
- Fear the Walking Dead
- The Feed (Australia)
- Felicity
- Felix the Cat
- Felony Squad
- Female Forces
- Fernwood 2-Night
- Ferris Bueller
- Fetch the Vet
- Fetch! with Ruff Ruffman
- Feud

=== FI ===
- Fifi and the Flowertots (UK)
- Fifteen To One
- The Flight Attendant
- Fight Back! With David Horowitz
- Figure It Out
- Os Filhos do Rock
- Fillmore!
- Filthy Rich & Catflap
- Filthy Rich: Cattle Drive
- Final Space
- The Finder
- Finders Keepers (Australia)
- Finders Keepers (UK) (1981)
- Finders Keepers (UK) (1991)
- Finders Keepers (US)
- Finding Carter
- Finding Sarah: From Royalty to the Real World
- Finley the Fire Engine
- Fire Country
- Fireflies (Australia)
- Firefly
- Firehouse
- Fireman Sam
- The Firm
- The First 48
- The First 48: Missing Persons
- First Family of Hip Hop
- First Look
- First Monday
- First of the Summer Wine
- First Take
- First Wave (Canada)
- F is for Family
- Fish Hooks
- Fishing With John
- Fishtronaut (Brazil)
- Fit for Fashion
- Five Children and It (1991)
- Five Fingers
- Five Star Jubilee
- The Fix
- Fix & Foxi and Friends
- Fixer Upper
- Fixer (UK)

=== FL ===
- The Flash (1990)
- The Flash (2014)
- Flambards
- Flamingo Road
- FlashForward
- Flash Forward
- Flash Gordon (1954)
- Flash Gordon (1996)
- Flash Gordon (2007)
- Flashpoint
- Flavor of Love
- Flex & Shanice
- Fleabag
- Fleabag Monkeyface
- Flea-Bitten!
- The Flintstones
- The Flintstone Kids
- Flight 29 Down
- Flight of the Conchords
- Flikken
- Flip or Flop
  - Flip or Flop
  - Flip or Flop Atlanta
  - Flip or Flop Chicago
  - Flip or Flop Follow-Up
  - Flip or Flop Fort Worth
  - Flip or Flop Nashville
  - Flip or Flop Vegas
- Flip That House
- Flip This House
- The Flip Wilson Show
- Flipper (1964)
- Flipper (1995)
- Flipping Out
- Flo
- Floribama Shore
- Flower Pot Men
- The Flumps (British)
- Fly Girls
- Fly Tales
- The Flying Nun
- Flying Rhino Junior High
- Floogals
- The Floor
- Floor is Lava

=== FO ===
- Foley Square
- The Following
- Food Network Challenge
- Food Network Star
- Food Party
- The Food That Built America
- Football Night in America
- Football Superstar
- For All Mankind
- For Better or for Worse
- Forbidden Science
- Force Five
- Ford Theatre
- Forensic Files
- Forever
- Forever Knight
- Forgive or Forget
- The Forgotten
- For the Love of Ray J
- Fortune Hunter
- The Fortunes and Misfortunes of Moll Flanders
- For Peete's Sake
- For the People (1965)
- For the People (2002)
- For the People (2018)
- Fortune: Million Pound Giveaway
- Fosse/Verdon
- Foster's Home for Imaginary Friends
- The Fosters
- Foundation
- The Four: Battle for Stardom
- Four Eyes!
- Four Feather Falls (UK)
- The Four Just Men
- Four Live (Ireland)
- Four Live (New Zealand)
- Four Star Playhouse
- Four Weddings (Australia)
- Four Weddings (UK)
- Fox & Friends
- Fox News Live
- Fox News Sunday
- Fox NFL Kickoff
- Fox NFL Sunday
- Fox Online
- Foyle's War (British)

=== FR ===
- Fraggle Rock
- Frank the Entertainer in a Basement Affair
- Franklin
- Franklin and Friends
- Franny's Feet (Canada)
- Frasier
- Freakazoid
- Freaks and Geeks
- FreakyLinks
- Freaky Stories (Canada)
- Fred's Head
- Fred Flintstone and Friends
- Fred: The Show
- The Fred Waring Show
- Freddie
- Freedom Fighters: The Ray
- Freefonix (UK)
- Freewheelers
- Frequency
- The Fresh Beat Band
- Fresh Meat
- Fresh Off the Boat
- The Fresh Prince of Bel-Air
- Freshwater Blue (Australia)
- Friday Night Lights
- Fridays
- Friend or Foe?
- Friends
- Friends and Lovers
- Friendzone
- Fries with That?
- Fringe
- Frisky Dingo
- Forever Eden
- Frontier Circus
- Frontier Doctor
- Frontier House
- Frontier Justice
- Frontiers (1989)
- Frontiers (1996)
- Frontline
- Frontline (Australia)

=== FT ===
- F Troop

=== FU ===
- Fugget About It (Canada)
- The Fugitive
- Full Frontal (Australia)
- Full Frontal with Samantha Bee
- Full House
- Fuller House
- The Funky Phantom
- The Funny Company
- Funny You Should Ask (1968)
- Funny You Should Ask (2017)
- Fury
- Futurama
- The Future Is Wild (Canada)
- Future Weapons
- Future Worm
- Futz!
- The Furchester Hotel

=== FW ===
- The F Word (UK)
- The F Word (US)

=== FZ ===
- F-Zero: GP Legend

Previous: List of television programs: E Next: List of television programs: G
