= List of television programs: Q–R =

Alphabetically indexed lists of television programs
0–9	A	B	C	D	E	F	G	H	I–J
K–L	M	N	O	P	Q–R	S	T	U–V–W	X–Y–Z

This is an alphabetical list of television program articles (or sections within articles about television programs). Spaces and special characters are ignored. This list covers television programs whose first letter (excluding "the") of the title are Q and R.

== Q ==
=== QA ===
- Q+A (Australia)
- Q&A (US)

=== QE ===
- Q.E.D. (UK)
- Q.E.D. (US)

=== QF ===
- Q-Force

=== QI ===
- QI

=== QU ===
- Quack Pack
- Quadratics
- Quads!
- Quantico
- Quantum Leap
- Quark
- Quatermass
- The Quatermass Experiment
- Queen America
- Queen Bees
- Queen for a Day
- The Queen Latifah Show
- Queen of the Office (South Korea)
- Queenie's Castle
- Queen of the South
- Queen Sugar
- Queen of Swords
- Queer as Folk (UK)
- Queer as Folk (US, 2000)
- Queer as Folk (US, 2022)
- Queer Duck
- Queer Eye (2003)
- Queer Eye (2018)
- Queer Eye for the Straight Girl
- Que Locura (Venezuela)
- A Question of Sport (BBC)
- Question Time (BBC topical debate)
- Quick Before They Catch Us
- Quick Draw McGraw
- Quick Fix Meals with Robin Miller
- Quiet on Set: The Dark Side of Kids TV
- Quill Awards
- Quiller
- Quincy, M.E.
- Quints by Surprise
- Quintuplets
- The Quiz with Balls
- Quiz Call
- Quiz Kids Challenge
- Quizmania
- Quiznation (UK)
- Quiznation (US)
- Quiz Time
- Qumi-Qumi (Russia)

== R ==
=== RA ===
- Rabbids Invasion
- Rab C. Nesbitt
- The Raccoons
- Rachael Ray
- Rachael vs. Guy: Celebrity Cook-Off
- Rachael Ray's Kids Cook-Off
- Rachael Ray's Tasty Travels
- The Rachel Zoe Project
- Radio Active
- Radio Free Roscoe
- Raffles
- Rag, Tag and Bobtail (British)
- Rage of Bahamut: Manaria Friends
- Raggs
- Rainbow
- Rainbow Rangers
- Rainbow Ruby
- Raising Expectations
- Raising Hope
- Raising the Bar
- Raising Whitley
- Ramar of the Jungle
- Ramsay's Kitchen Nightmares (UK)
- The Ranch
- Randall and Hopkirk (Deceased) (1969)
- Randall and Hopkirk (2000)
- Random! Cartoons
- Randy Cunningham: 9th Grade Ninja
- Randy to the Rescue
- Ranger Rob
- Rated A for Awesome

=== RE ===
- Reading Rainbow
- Ready Jet Go!
- Ready for Love
- Ready or Not (Canada)
- The Real
- The Real Adventures of Jonny Quest
- Real Chance of Love
- Real and Chance: The Legend Hunters
- The Real Ghostbusters
- The Real Housewives
  - Les Vraies Housewives (France)
  - The Real Housewives of Athens
  - The Real Housewives of Atlanta
  - The Real Housewives of Auckland
  - The Real Housewives of Beverly Hills
  - The Real Housewives of Cheshire
  - The Real Housewives of Dallas
  - The Real Housewives of D.C.
  - The Real Housewives of Melbourne
  - The Real Housewives of Miami
  - The Real Housewives of New Jersey
  - The Real Housewives of New York City
  - The Real Housewives of Orange County
  - The Real Housewives of Potomac
  - The Real Housewives of Salt Lake City
  - The Real Housewives of Sydney
  - The Real Housewives of Toronto
  - The Real Housewives of Vancouver
- Real Husbands of Hollywood
- The Real L Word
- The Real Love Boat
- The Real McCoy
- The Real McCoys
- The Real O'Neals
- Reality Racing
- Real People
- Real Sports with Bryant Gumbel
- The Real Story
- Real Time with Bill Maher
- The Real World
- The Really Loud House
- Really Me!
- Reaper
- Reba
- Rebound
- The Rebel
- The Rebel Billionaire: Branson's Quest for the Best
- Rebelde
- Rebelde Way
- ReBoot
- Reborn!
- Recess
- Recipe for Deception
- Red Band Society
- Red Dwarf
- Red Eye w/Greg Gutfeld
- The Red Green Show
- The Red Line
- The Red Skelton Show
- Red Table Talk
- Red vs. Blue
- Redakai
- Redwall
- Reef Break
- Regal Academy
- The Regime
- Regular Show
- Rehab Addict
- Rehearsals (Israel)
- Reign
- Rel
- Reliable Sources
- Relic Hunter
- Remington Steele
- Remodeled
- Remote Control
- Remy & Boo
- Renegade
- The Renegades
- Ren & Stimpy "Adult Party Cartoon"
- The Ren & Stimpy Show
- Reno 911!
- Rentaghost
- The Replacements
- Rescue 8
- Rescue Heroes
- Rescue Me (US)
- Rescue Me (UK)
- Rescue 911
- #TheResident
- Resident Alien
- The Restaurant (Ireland)
- The Restaurant (UK)
- The Restaurant (US)
- Restaurant: Impossible
- The Restless Years
- Retired at 35
- The Return of Jezebel James
- Return of the Mac
- The Return of the Psammead (1993)
- Return to Peyton Place
- Reunion
- Rev.
- Rev & Roll
- Revenge
- Revenge Body with Khloé Kardashian
- Review
- Revolution
- Rex the Runt

=== RH ===
- Rhett and Link's Buddy System
- Rhoda

=== RI ===
- Rich Girls
- Rich Kids of Beverly Hills
- The Rich List
- Rich Man, Poor Man
- Rich Man, Poor Man Book II
- Richard Diamond, Private Detective
- The Riches
- Richie Rich (1980)
- Richie Rich (1996)
- Richie Rich (2015)
- Rick and Morty
- Rick Mercer Report
- Ricky Sprocket: Showbiz Boy
- Ricki Lake
- The Ricki Lake Show
- Ricky Zoom
- Ride
- Ridiculousness
- Ridley Jones
- The Rifleman
- Right This Minute
- The Right View
- Ringer
- Ring of Honor Wrestling
- Rimba's Island
- Ripper Street
- Ripping Yarns
- Ripley
- Riptide (American)
- Riptide (Australian)
- Rise (Canada)
- Rise (US)
- The Rise of Phoenixes (China)
- Rise of the Teenage Mutant Ninja Turtles
- Rise of the Witches
- Rita Rocks
- River (British)
- The River (UK)
- The River (US)
- River Cottage
- Riverdale (Canada)
- Riverdale (US)
- River Monsters
- Rizzoli & Isles

=== RL ===
- R.L. Stine's The Haunting Hour: The Series

=== RO ===
- Road Rovers
- Road Rules
- Road to Avonlea
- Roadtrip Nation
- The Roaring 20's
- Roary the Racing Car
- Rob & Big
- Rob & Chyna
- Rob Dyrdek's Fantasy Factory
- Rob the Robot
- Robert Montgomery Presents
- Robin Hood (2006)
- Robin Hood: Mischief in Sherwood
- Robinson Crusoe
- Robin's Nest
- Robocar Poli
- RoboCop (1988)
- RoboCop (1994)
- RoboCop: Alpha Commando
- RoboCop: Prime Directives
- RoboRoach (Canada)
- Robot Chicken
- Robotboy
- Robot Girls Z
- Robotech
- Rock of Love with Bret Michaels
- Rock of Love Bus with Bret Michaels
- Rock of Love: Charm School
- Rock Profile (UK)
- Rock & Roll Jeopardy!
- Rock Star
- Rocket Power
- Rocket Robin Hood
- The Rocketeer
- The Rockford Files
- Rocko's Modern Life
- The Rocky and Bullwinkle Show
- Rocky King detective
- Roger Ramjet
- Rolie Polie Olie
- Rome
- Romeo!
- The Rookie
- The Rookie: Feds
- Rookie Blue
- The Rookies
- Rookies
- Roobarb (British)
- Room 101 (British)
- Room 222
- Room Raiders
- Roots
- Roots: The Next Generations
- The Ropers
- Ros na Rún
- Roseanne
- Rosemary and Thyme
- The Rosie O'Donnell Show
- The Rosie Show
- Roswell
- Roswell, New Mexico
- Round the Twist
- Roundhouse
- Route 66
- Rowan & Martin's Laugh-In
- Roy
- The Roy Rogers Show
- The Royal
- Royal Blood
- Royal Canadian Air Farce
- Royal Crackers
- Royal Family
- Royal Pains
- Royal Rules of Ohio
- Royal Tramp
- The Royals
- The Royle Family

=== RU ===
- Rubbadubbers (UK)
- Rubik the Amazing Cube
- Ruby and the Well
- Ruby Gloom (Canada)
- Ruff and Reddy
- Ruff-Ruff, Tweet and Dave
- Rugby Special
- Rugrats
- Rules of Engagement
- Run's House
- Run for Your Life
- Run Joe Run
- Run of the House
- Run the World
- Runaway (UK)
- Runaway (US)
- Runaways
- Running Wilde
- Running Wild with Bear Grylls
- The RuPaul Show
- RuPaul's Drag Race
- RuPaul's Drag Race: All Stars
- RuPaul's Drag U
- Rupert
- Rurouni Kenshin (Japan)
- Rush
- Russian Doll
- Russian Roulette
- Rustic Rehab
- Rusty Rivets

=== RW ===
- RWBY
- RWBY Chibi

=== RY ===
- Ryan (Australia)
- Ryan and Tatum: The O'Neals
- Ryan's Hope
- Ryan's Mystery Playdate

Previous: List of television programs: P Next: List of television programs: S
