= List of television programs: D =

Alphabetically indexed lists of television programs
0–9	A	B	C	D	E	F	G	H	I–J
K–L	M	N	O	P	Q–R	S	T	U–V–W	X–Y–Z

This is an alphabetical list of television program articles (or sections within articles about television programs). Spaces and special characters are ignored. This list covers television programs whose first letter (excluding "the") of the title is D.

== D ==
=== DA ===
- The D.A. (1971)
- The D.A. (2004)
- Da Ali G Show
- Da Boom Crew
- Da Jammies
- Da Vinci's Demons
- Da Vinci's Inquest
- Dad's Army
- Dads
- The Daily 10
- The Daily Buzz
- Daily Planet
- Daily Pop
- The Daily Show (Ireland)
- The Daily Show (US)
- Daisy of Love
- Daitetsujin 17
- Daktari
- Dallas (1978)
- Dallas (2012)
- Dallas Cowboys Cheerleaders: Making the Team
- The Daltons
- Damages
- Damnation
- Dan August
- Dan Raven
- Dance Academy
- Dance Moms
- Dance Moms: Miami
- Dance Mums with Jennifer Ellison (UK)
- Dance on Sunset
- Dance War: Bruno vs. Carrie Ann
- DanceX (UK)
- Dance Your Ass Off
- Dancin' to the Hits
- Dancing on Ice (UK)
- Dancing with the Stars
  - Dancing with the Stars (US)
- Dancing with the Stars: Juniors
- Danger 5
- Danger Force
- Danger Island
- Danger Man
- Danger Mouse
- Dangerous Minds (TV series)
- Dani's Castle
- Dani's House
- Daniel Boone
- Daniel Tiger's Neighborhood
- Danny Phantom
- Dan Vs.
- Darcy's Wild Life
- Daredevil
- Daria
- Dark
- Dark Angel (2000, U.S.)
- Dark Angel (2016, UK)
- Dark Blue
- Darker than Black
- Dark Matter (Canada)
- Dark Matter (US)
- Dark Matters: Twisted But True
- Darknet (Canada)
- Dark Net (US)
- Dark Oracle
- Dark Shadows
- Dark Shadows (1991)
- Dark Side of Comedy
- Dark Side of the 2000s
- Dark Side of the 90s
- Darkwing Duck
- Dash Dolls
- Date My Ex: Jo & Slade
- Dateline (Australia)
- Dateline London (UK)
- Dateline NBC
- The Dating Game
- The Dating Guy
- Dating Naked
- Dave
- Dave Allen
- Dave The Barbarian
- David Copperfield (UK)
- The David Letterman Show
- David Tutera's CELEBrations
- Dawn of the Croods
- Dawson's Creek
- A Day in the Life
- Daybreak (UK)
- Day Break
- The Day My Butt Went Psycho!
- The Days and Nights of Molly Dodd
- Days Like These (UK)
- Days of Our Lives
- DaySide

=== DC ===
- DC Super Hero Girls
- DC Super Friends

=== DE ===
- Dead Boy Detectives
- Dead Gorgeous
- Dead of Night (UK)
- Dead of Summer
- Deadliest Catch
- Deadliest Warrior
- Dead Like Me
- Dead to Me
- Deadly Women
- Deadly Class
- The Dead Zone
- Deadwood
- Deal or No Deal (UK)
- Deal or No Deal (US)
- Deal or No Deal Island
- The Dean Martin Celebrity Roast
- The Dean Martin Show
- The Deal (2023) (South Korea)
- Dear Phoebe
- Dear Sister
- Death Battle! (Web series)
- Death in Paradise
- Death Note
- Debatable (BBC)
- The Debbie Reynolds Show
- Debra!
- Decisiones
- Decker
- Deep State
- The Defenders
- Defiance
- Defying Gravity
- Degrassi High (Canada)
- Degrassi Junior High (Canada)
- Degrassi: Next Class (Canada)
- Degrassi: The Next Generation (Canada)
- Deion's Family Playbook
- Deli Boys
- Delicious in Dungeon
- Delilah & Julius
- Deliver Me
- Delocated
- Deltora Quest
- Demons
- Denise Richards: It's Complicated
- Denkigai no Honya-san
- Dennis and Gnasher (Canada/UK)
- Dennis & Gnasher: Unleashed! (UK)
- Dennis the Menace (1959)
- Dennis the Menace (1986)
- Dennis the Menace and Gnasher (Australia/UK)
- Department S
- Derry Girls (UK)
- Descendants: Wicked World
- Desert Punk
- Designated Survivor
- Designed to Sell
- Designing Women
- Despierta América
- Desperate Housewives
- Destroy Build Destroy
- Desus & Mero (2016)
- Desus & Mero (2019)
- Detention (US)
- Detention (Taiwan)
- Detentionaire
- Devil in the Family: The Fall of Ruby Franke
- The Devil Is a Part-Timer!
- Devious Maids
- Dexter
- Dexter's Laboratory

=== DH ===
- Dharma & Greg

=== DI ===
- Diagnosis: Murder
- Diana
- Diary of a Future President
- The Diary of Samuel Pepys
- Dibo the Gift Dragon
- Dick Figures
- Dickinson
- The Dick Van Dyke Show
- Different Strokes
- A Different World
- Di-Gata Defenders
- Digby Dragon
- Digimon
- Digman!
- Dilbert
- Diners, Drive-Ins and Dives
- Dink, the Little Dinosaur
- Dinner: Impossible
- Dinosaucers
- Dinosaur King
- Dinosaur Train
- Dinosaurs
- DinoSquad
- Dinotopia
- Dinotrux
- The Diplomat (US)
- The Diplomat (UK)
- Dirt
- Dirtgirlworld
- Dirty Jobs
- Dirty John
- Dirty Sally
- Dirty Sexy Money
- Dirty Soap
- Discovery of Love (South Korea)
- Disenchantment
- Disjointed
- Disney's Adventures of the Gummi Bears
- Disney's Fairy Tale Weddings
- Dispatches
- Distraction (UK game show)
- Divided (UK)
- Divided (US)
- Divine Design
- Divorce
- The Divorce (Australia)
- Dixon of Dock Green

=== DN ===
- D.N. Ace

=== DO ===
- Do Over
- Doc Elliot
- Doc Martin
- Doc McStuffins
- Doctors (UK)
- The Doctors (US soap opera)
- The Doctors (US talk show)
- Doctor Snuggles
- Doctor Stranger (South Korea)
- Doctor Who (UK)
- Dodger, Bonzo and the Rest
- Dog and Beth: On the Hunt
- Dog with a Blog
- Dog the Bounty Hunter
- Dog Bites Man
- Dog Eat Dog
- Dog Whisperer with Cesar Millan
- Dogs
- Doki
- Dollhouse
- Doña Bárbara (Columbia)
- Donkey Kong Country
- The Donna Dewberry Show
- The Donna Reed Show
- Donnie Loves Jenny
- Donny & Marie
- Don't
- Don't Be Tardy
- Don't Call Me Charlie!
- Don't Forget the Lyrics!
  - Don't Forget the Lyrics! (UK)
  - Don't Forget the Lyrics! (US)
- Don't Forget Your Toothbrush
- Don't Tell the Bride (UK)
- Don't Toy with Me, Miss Nagatoro
- Don't Trust the B— in Apartment 23
- Don't Wait Up
- The Doodlebops
- Doodlebops Rockin' Road Show
- Doogie Howser, M.D.
- Doom Patrol
- Doomwatch
- The Doozers
- Doraemon
- Doraemon: Gadget Cat from the Future
- Dora the Explorer
- Dora and Friends: Into the City!
- The Doris Day Show
- Dorothy and the Wizard of Oz
- Dot.
- Double Dare (CBS)
- Double Dare (Nickelodeon)
- Double Dragon
- Double Take (2009) (Australia)
- Double Take (2018) (US)
- Double Trouble (U.S.)
- Double Your Money (UK)
- Doubt (Al Shak) (UK)
- Doug
- Douglas Family Gold
- The Downer Channel
- Downton Abbey
- Downward Dog

=== DR ===
- Dr. 90210
- Dr. Chef
- Dr. Dimensionpants
- Dr. Finlay's Casebook
- Dr. Katz, Professional Therapist
- Dr. Ken
- Dr. Kildare
- The Dr. Laura Berman Show
- The Dr. Oz Show
- Dr. Phil
- Dr. Pimple Popper
- Dr. Quinn, Medicine Woman
- Dr. Shrinker
- Dr. Steve-O
- Dragnet
- Dragon
- Dragon Ball
- Dragon Ball GT
- Dragon Ball Kai
- Dragon Ball Super
- Dragon Ball Z
- Dragon Booster
- Dragon Flyz
- Dragon Tales
- DragonflyTV
- Dragons' Den
  - Dragons' Den (UK)
- Drake & Josh
- Drama Club
- Drawn Together
- DreamWorks Dragons
- The Dresden Files
- The Drew Carey Show
- Drew and Shannon Live (New Zealand)
- Drive
- Drama Club
- Drop Dead Diva
- Drop the Mic
- Drunk History (UK)
- Drunk History (US)

=== DU ===
- Duck Dodgers
- Duck Dynasty
- The Duck Factory
- Duckman
- DuckTales (1987)
- DuckTales (2017)
- The Dude Perfect Show
- Dude, That's My Ghost!
- Dude, What Would Happen
- Dudley The Dragon
- Dudley Do-Right
- Due South
- Duncanville
- Dungeons & Dragons
- The Dukes of Hazzard
- Dusty's Trail

=== DY ===
- Dyesebel (2014) (Philippines)
- Dynasty (Australia)
- Dynasty (1981) (US)
- Dynasty (2017) (US)
- Dynomutt, Dog Wonder

Previous: List of television programs: C Next: List of television programs: E
