= List of television programs: numbers =

Alphabetically indexed lists of television programs
| 0–9 | A | B | C | D | E | F | G | H | I–J |
| K–L | M | N | O | P | Q–R | S | T | U–V–W | X–Y–Z |

This is an alphabetical list of television program articles (or sections within articles about television programs). Spaces and special characters are ignored. This list covers television programs whose first character of the title (excluding "a" or "the") is a number. It does not include television programs whose titles contain a number elsewhere in the title.

== Numbers ==
=== 1 ===
- The 1/2 Hour News Hour (2007)
- The 100 (2014)
- 100 Days My Prince (2018) (South Korean)
- 100 Days of Deception (2026) (South Korean)
- 100 Deeds for Eddie McDowd (1999–2002)
- 100 Questions (2010–2014)
- 100 Things to Do Before High School (2014–2016)
- 100 Winners (2007)
- 101 Dalmatian Street (2019–2020)
- 101 Dalmatians: The Series (1997–1998)
- 101 Ways to Leave a Gameshow (2010)
- 10-8: Officers on Duty (2003–2004)
- 1000-lb Best Friends
- 1000-lb Sisters
- 1000 Ways to Die (2008–2012)
- 10 Things I Hate About You (2009–2010)
- The 10th Kingdom
- 10i Entoli (2004–2015) (Greece)
- 11.22.63 (2016)
- 12 Deadly Days (2016)
- 12 O'Clock High
- 12 oz. Mouse (2005–2006)
- 12 Monkeys (2015-2018)
- 12 Years Promise (2014) (South Korean)
- The 13 Ghosts of Scooby-Doo (1985)
- 13 Reasons Why (2017–2020)
- 15/Love (2004–2006)
- 1600 Penn (2012–2013)
- 16 and Pregnant (2009–)
- 16 Hudson (2018–)
- 18 to Life (2010–2011)
- 18 Again (2020) (South Korean)
- 19 Kids and Counting (2008–2015)
- $1.98 Beauty Show (1978–1980)
- 1st Look (2008–)
- 1 vs. 100 (2006–2011)

=== 2 ===
- 20/20 (1962–1967) (Canada)
- 20/20 (1993–2014) (New Zealand)
- 20/20 (1978–) (US)
- 20th Century with Mike Wallace
- 21 Jump Street (1987–1991)
- 227 (1985–1990)
- 24 (2001–2014)
- 24: Legacy (2017)
- 24 Hour Flip
- 24 Hours in A&E (2011-present)
- $24 in 24 (2012–present)
- 240-Robert (1979–1981)
- 25 Words or Less (2018–present)
- The $25,000 Pyramid (1973–2012)
- 26 Men (1957–1959)
- 2 Broke Girls (2011–2017)
- 2 Stupid Dogs (1993–1995)
- 2DTV (2001–2004)

=== 3 ===
- 3 Minute GameShow
- 3% (2016–present)
- 3AM (2015)
- 3Below (2018–2019)
- 3-2-1 Contact (1980–1992)
- 3-2-1 Penguins! (2007–2008)
- 30 for 30 (2009–present)
- 30 Minute Meals (2001–present)
- 30 Rock (2006–2013)
- 30 Seconds to Fame (2002–2003)
- 31 Minutes (2003–2014)
- 36 (2011–present)
- 3 Body Problem (2024-present)
- 3 lbs (2006–)
- 3rd Rock from the Sun (1996–2001)
- 3rd and Bird (2008-2010)
- 3-South (2002–2003)

=== 4 ===
- $40 a Day
- 40 y 20
- The 4400 (2004–2007)
- 44 Cats (2018–2021)
- The 45 Rules of Divorce
- 48 Hours (1988–)
- 48 Hours to Buy
- 49 Days (2011) (South Korean)
- 4 Square (2003–2007)
- 4th and Loud (2014)
- 4 Legendary Witches (2014) (South Korean)

=== 5 ===
- 50/50 (1997–2005)
- 50/50 Flip
- 50/50 Heroes (2022)
- 50 Cent: The Money and the Power (2008–2009)
- 500 Questions (2015–2016)
- 548 Days Abducted Online

=== 6 ===
- 6 Little McGhees (2012–2014)
- 60 Days In (2016–)
- 60 Days In: Narcoland
- 60 Minutes (1968–)
- 60 Minutes Sports (2013–)
- 60 Seconds to Sell
- 64 Zoo Lane (1999–2013)
- The $64,000 Question (1955–58, 1990–93)
- 666 Park Avenue (2012–2013)
- 6teen (2004–2010)

=== 7 ===
- The 700 Club (1966–)
- 704 Hauser (1994)
- 77 Sunset Strip (1958–1964)
- The 7D (2014–2016)
- 7th Heaven (1996–2007)
- 7 First Kisses (2016) (South Korean)
- 7 Little Johnstons

=== 8 ===
- 8:15 from Manchester (1990–1992)
- 800 Words (2015–present)
- 8 Man (1963–1964)
- 8 Simple Rules (2002–2005)
- 8th & Ocean (2006)

=== 9 ===
- 9JKL
- 9-1-1
- 9-1-1: Lone Star
- 9/11: One Day in America
- 90's House
- 90210 (2008–2013)
- 9 to 5 (1982–1988)
- 90 Bristol Court (1964–1965)
- 90 Day Diaries
- 90 Day Fiancé (2014–present)
- 90 Day Fiancé Before the 90 Days
- 90 Day Fiancé Happily Ever After?
- 90 Day Fiancé UK (UK)
- 90 Days, Time to Love (2006–2007) (South Korea)

Next: List of television programs: A
