= All the Right Moves =

All the Right Moves may refer to:

== Film and television ==
- All the Right Moves (film), a 1983 American film starring Tom Cruise
- All the Right Moves, a 2012 American reality TV series starring Travis Wall
- All the Right Moves, a British TV programme presented by Quentin Willson
- "All the Right Moves" (Dawson's Creek), a television episode

== Music ==
- "All the Right Moves" (Jennifer Warnes and Chris Thompson song), from the soundtrack of the film, 1983
- "All the Right Moves" (OneRepublic song), 2009
- "All the Right Moves", a song by Bury Your Dead from Cover Your Tracks
- "All the Right Moves", a song by David Hasselhoff from Night Rocker
- "All the Right Moves", a song by Kick Axe from Vices
- All the Right Moves, a "gonzo opera" with a libretto by Thomas Bullene Woodward

== Books ==
- All the Right Moves: A Guide to Crafting Breakthrough Strategy, a 2000 book by Constantinos C. Markides
- All the Right Moves: A VLSI Architecture for Chess, a Ph.D. thesis by Carl Ebeling
