= Appalachia: A History of Mountains and People =

- Genre: Documentary
- Written by: Ross Spears; Jamie Ross
- Directed by: Ross Spears
- Narrated by: Sissy Spacek
- Country of origin: United States
- Original language: English
- No. of seasons: 1
- No. of episodes: 4

Production
- Producer: Jamie Ross
- Running time: 50 minutes

Original release
- Network: PBS
- Release: April 9 – April 30, 2009

Appalachia: A History of Mountains and People is a four-part American documentary television series that premiered April 9, 2009, on PBS. The series explores the natural and human history of the Appalachian Mountains region.

== Background ==
Most of the people featured in the series come from, or live in, the Appalachian region, including the narrator Sissy Spacek. Some of the other people featured include Henry Louis Gates Jr., Barbara Kingsolver, E. O. Wilson, Nikki Giovanni, Robert Coles, Wilma Dykeman, Charles Hudson, Denise Giardina, Mary Lee Settle, John Ehle, Sharyn McCrumb, and Gurney Norman.

== Reception ==
Appalachia was selected as the "Top of the List 2010" by Booklist, and heralded by reviewer Candace Smith as a "sterling four-part series". She commented: "Beautifully shot and vast in scope, this stellar series combines science, history, and arts in a tribute to Appalachia that offers hope for the future."

Diana Nelson Jones of the Pittsburgh Post-Gazette called the series "engrossing and beautifully filmed and illustrated". Jones suggested that with enough viewers Appalachia "could be the beginning of a cure for society's malignant attitude about the region".

Jeff Biggers of The Huffington Post stated "Appalachia takes viewers on a breakthrough journey through our nation's burning ground of discovery, colonization, industrial development, social revolutions, and cultural and artistic endeavors", lauding the series as "a landmark event for television" that "transcends the usual media portraits of poverty, pity, depravity and the picturesque in America's most misunderstood and maligned region, and delivers a breathtaking view of Appalachia's extraordinary role in shaping our country."

Steven Rosen of the Cincinnati CityBeat graded the series a C saying that it "takes way too long getting to the state of this region in the 20th and 21st centuries and then skims over critical material". "Instead, it allows a lot of romantic musings from several writers and scientists about the land".

In a review in The Journal of Southern History, Mary Ella Engel praised Appalachia's "hypnotic storytelling", "sensory delight", and "smooth narration", dubbing it a "powerful and provocative introduction...[that] provides the perfect vehicle with which to express sorrow for the region's past and hope for Appalachia's future."

Donald Edward Davis, Author of Where There Are Mountains: An Environmental History of the Southern Appalachians referred to it as a "ground-breaking documentary", which "beautifully documents the environmental history of Appalachia, illustrating the many ways the mountain landscape has, for centuries, shaped the destinies of those who have called the region home."

Professor of History at the University of Kentucky, Ron Eller, commended filmmakers Jamie Ross and Ross Spears on "[producing] a new standard for documentary films about Appalachia and [providing] a new framework for understanding the mountains and our relationship to them", calling Appalachia "a truly powerful piece of work".

== Awards ==
- Best Video of the Year 2010, The American Library Association, Booklist
- Mountain Hero Award 2009, The Mountain Institute

== Episodes ==
#	Title	Original release date
1	"Time and Terrain"	April 9, 2009
The area's natural history is explored from its origins 500 million years ago, to the arrival of European explorers.
2	"New Green World"	April 16, 2009
Native Americans and European settlers clash over control of the region.
3	"Mountain Revolutions"	April 23, 2009
The American Civil War hastens the decline of an agrarian way of life in favor of new industrial development.
4	"Power and Place"	April 30, 2009
The Appalachian region through the 20th century.
