= Gavin & Lott Show =

- Starring: Walter Harris Gavin; Bob Lott
- Country of origin: United States

Production
- Running time: 30 minutes

Original release
- Release: 1983 – 1985

Gavin & Lott Show is an American music video program that was syndicated from June 26, 1983 to 1985.The show featured mostly R&B and Soul recording artists and performers' music videos. The show was the first music video program to be broadcast by Channel 10, airing after the late movie. It received high Nielsen ratings.

== History ==
Gavin & Lott Show premiered on in 1983 and was originally a half-hour show. The show was created after MTV refused to play videos by most African-American musicians.
