= The Real Housewives of Atlanta season 16 =

The Real Housewives of Atlanta
- Season 16
- Promotional poster
- Starring: Phaedra Parks; Porsha Williams; Drew Sidora; Brit Eady; Shamea Morton Mwangi; Angela Oakley; Kelli Potter
- No. of episodes: 20

Release
- Original network: Bravo
- Original release: March 9 – July 27, 2025

Season chronology
- ← Previous; Season 15 Next → Season 17

The sixteenth season of The Real Housewives of Atlanta, an American reality television series, was broadcast on Bravo. It premiered on March 9, 2025, and concluded on July 27, 2025. It was primarily filmed in Atlanta, Georgia. The season's executive producers are Steven Weinstock, Glenda Hersh, Lauren Eskelin, Lorraine Haughton-Lawson, Glenda Cox, Shanae Humphrey, and Andy Cohen.

The Real Housewives of Atlanta focuses on the lives of Phaedra Parks, Porsha Williams, Drew Sidora, Brit Eady, Shamea Morton Mwangi, Angela Oakley and Kelli Potter, with Cynthia Bailey appearing as a friend of the housewives and Kenya Moore making guest appearances.

This season marked the second departure of Kenya Moore, and the only appearance of Brit Eady.

== Cast ==
The sixteenth season of the series features an almost entirely different cast from the show's previous season. Following the conclusion of the show's fifteenth season, cast members Kandi Burruss, Marlo Hampton, Sanya Richards-Ross, and Shereé Whitfield all departed the series. Kenya Moore and Drew Sidora were initially the only housewives from the fifteenth season slated to return. Moore eventually departed the sixteenth season midway through filming and was demoted to a guest role.

The sixteenth season of the series saw the return of Porsha Williams, who debuted in the fifth season alongside Moore and originally departed the show following the conclusion of the show's thirteenth season. Former housewife Cynthia Bailey returned as a friend of the housewives. After Moore's departure from the sixteenth season, it was announced that former cast member Phaedra Parks would also be returning to the series as a full-time housewife. Bailey and Parks both joined the series in its third season and departed after the thirteenth and ninth seasons respectively.

Shamea Morton, who has appeared in several previous seasons of the series as both a friend of and guest, was upgraded to a full-time housewife for the first time. Additionally, three new cast members were added to the show: Brit Eady, Kelli Ferrell, and Angela Oakley. Morton is a singer, dancer, and actress, Eady is an insurance agent, Ferrell is a chef and restaurant owner, and Oakley is an entrepreneur who works in real estate and tax preparation and the wife of retired NBA player Charles Oakley.

== Production ==
Production for the sixteenth season began in May 2024 and concluded in August 2024. In mid-June 2024, Kenya Moore was suspended from filming pending the results of an investigation by the network into an incident where she displayed a sexually explicit photo allegedly of fellow cast member Brit Eady at the grand opening of her hair spa. On June 25, 2024, it was announced that Moore was departing the series and would not resume filming for the remainder of the sixteenth season. Moore's role in the season was reduced to guest appearances as a result of the incident. She was later replaced by former housewife Phaedra Parks.

The sixteenth season's reunion was filmed on June 5, 2025, in Atlanta. Eady and Moore both did not attend the reunion taping, Eady didn't attend by choice while Moore wasn't invited by the network to participate following her suspension from show. The following day, it was reported that Eady filed a $20 million lawsuit against Bravo, NBCUniversal, Truly Original, and Endemol Shine North America for defamation, intentional infliction of emotional distress, sexual harassment, and fostering a hostile work environment. In her lawsuit, Eady claims that Bravo denied her "repeated requests" to show her the sexually explicit photo that Moore displayed at her hair spa opening prior to footage of the event airing. Upon seeing the photo after the episode depicting the incident aired a year later, Eady says she discovered that the photo displayed at Moore's event was not actually a photo of her. Eady's lawsuit also alleges that the network "willfully, intentionally, recklessly, and/or with gross negligence produced, edited, and aired an episode" falsely portraying that the photo shown at Moore's event was of her. On July 14, 2025, Eady officially announced her departure from the series.

The Real Housewives of Atlanta is produced by Truly Original for Bravo. Steven Weinstock, Glenda Hersh, Lauren Eskelin, Lorraine Haughton-Lawson, Glenda Cox, Shanae Humphrey, and Andy Cohen are recognized as the series' executive producers. Kate Murphy and Saleda Bryant serve as co-executive producers.

== Episodes ==
The Real Housewives of Atlanta season 16 episodes
| No. overall | No. in season | Title | Original release date | U.S. viewers (millions) |
|---|---|---|---|---|
| 321 | 1 | "Welcome Back Peaches" | March 9, 2025 | 0.72 |
New housewife Kelli gossips about Porsha, who is in the midst of another divorce. Drew reveals she's now working with Porsha's baby daddy. Shamea hosts her own birthday party, where Porsha confronts both Kelli and Drew.
| 322 | 2 | "Hot Dogs & Hot Mics" | March 16, 2025 | 0.67 |
Porsha calls out both Drew and Dennis for filming together without her permission. Shamea meets with her former surrogate.
| 323 | 3 | "High Notes and Cheap Shots" | March 23, 2025 | 0.64 |
Porsha and Kelli break bread ahead of Kelli's charity event, where Angela and Shamea exchange words.
| 324 | 4 | "The Vault" | March 30, 2025 | 0.56 |
Drew and Ralph discuss their relationship. At Angela's dinner party, Shamea brings an olive branch and Brit pops off at Kenya.
| 325 | 5 | "About Last Night" | April 6, 2025 | 0.62 |
Brit prepares to apologize to Kenya. Angela meets with her daughter. Kenya hosts the grand opening of her new Kenya Moore Hair Spa, but the event takes a shocking turn when she publicly reveals a sexually explicit image of Brit.
| 326 | 6 | "Peace, Interrupted" | April 13, 2025 | 0.57 |
The women come to terms with what happened at Kenya's spa opening. Angela questions Brit's claims about her career.
| 327 | 7 | "Nashville Hold Em" | April 20, 2025 | 0.50 |
Drew has questions about Brit's past. The women head to Nashville for Porsha's birthday. Angela shows up to the celebration late with news that she's also invited Drew to come as well.
| 328 | 8 | "Boots on the Ground" | April 27, 2025 | 0.58 |
Drew arrives at Porsha's birthday celebration in Nashville. After a tense dinner, Angela overhears Porsha talking trash.
| 329 | 9 | "Blame It on the Henny" | May 4, 2025 | 0.63 |
Cynthia hosts a Bailey-Que in the hopes of repairing some of the group’s fractured relationships.
| 330 | 10 | "Meditation and Mediation" | May 11, 2025 | 0.55 |
Shamea and Porsha meet with Ralph. Later, Angela tells Porsha what Shamea has been saying about their friendship behind her back, leading to a confrontation in front of the group.
| 331 | 11 | "Let's Be Honest" | May 18, 2025 | 0.53 |
Angela talks about family drama with her mother. Shamea and Porsha meet to discuss their friendship.
| 332 | 12 | "The Frack Is Back" | May 25, 2025 | 0.46 |
The ladies attend the soft launch of Brit’s new shapewear line. Later, Porsha reconnects with her old friend Phaedra.
| 333 | 13 | "Chapter 1: Reset" | June 1, 2025 | 0.65 |
Porsha and Drew attempt to resolve their differences. The ladies, now including Phaedra, begin their trip to Grenada.
| 334 | 14 | "Chapter 2: Renew" | June 8, 2025 | 0.58 |
In Grenada, Brit has tension with both Shamea and Porsha. Later, some bad news about Shamea's daughter unites the group.
| 335 | 15 | "Chapter 3: Rebirth" | June 15, 2025 | 0.54 |
The ladies bond on their last night in Grenada.
| 336 | 16 | "Chicken and Waffles" | June 22, 2025 | 0.49 |
Angela is publicly confronted by a man who claims that Charles is cheating on her. Later, Phaedra hosts a fashion show where former besties Kelli and Brit exchange low blows.
| 337 | 17 | "Game Over" | June 29, 2025 | 0.69 |
Phaedra comforts Porsha after a family death. At a showcase for her music, Shamea goes back and forth with Brit. Later, Angela hosts a charity event where she accuses Phaedra of orchestrating the on-camera rumors about her husband.
| 338 | 18 | "Reunion Part 1" | July 13, 2025 | 0.54 |
Brit fails to show to the reunion. Porsha makes amends with Drew. Angela doubles down on her suspicions of Phaedra.
| 339 | 19 | "Reunion Part 2" | July 20, 2025 | 0.54 |
Angela's receipts are questioned. The ladies discuss Kenya and Brit. After Shamea is encouraged to address her unresolved tension with Phaedra, old wounds are reopened between long-time besties Porsha and Shamea.
| 340 | 20 | "Reunion Part 3" | July 27, 2025 | 0.59 |
Porsha and Shamea continue to hash out their differences. Later, the men join the stage and Charles addresses the rumors about his past, while Drew and Ralph discuss their rocky relationship.
