= The Real Housewives of Atlanta season 10 =

Season of television series

The Real Housewives of Atlanta
- Season 10
- Cover used by the iTunes Store; Left to right: Moore, Leakes, Bailey, Williams, Burruss and Whitfield
- Starring: NeNe Leakes; Shereé Whitfield; Kandi Burruss; Cynthia Bailey; Kenya Moore; Porsha Williams
- No. of episodes: 22

Release
- Original network: Bravo
- Original release: November 5, 2017 – April 29, 2018

Season chronology
- ← Previous; Season 9 Next → Season 11

The tenth season of The Real Housewives of Atlanta, an American reality television series, broadcast on Bravo, premiered on November 5, 2017, and concluded on April 29, 2018, and was primarily filmed in Atlanta, Georgia. Its executive producers are Steven Weinstock, Glenda Hersh, Lauren Eskelin, Lorraine Haughton-Lawson, Luke Neslage, Anne Swan, Anthony Sylvester, and Andy Cohen.

The Real Housewives of Atlanta focuses on the lives of Nene Leakes, Shereé Whitfield, Kandi Burruss, Cynthia Bailey, Kenya Moore and Porsha Williams.

This season marked the second departure of original housewife Shereè Whitfield. She eventually returned for the show's 14th season. It also marked the first departure of Kenya Moore. She eventually returned for the show’s 12th season.

== Production and crew ==
In April 2017, the series was renewed for its tenth season. The tenth season was officially announced in September 2017, with a premiere of November 5, 2017. Executives producer for the season include: Steven Weinstock, Glenda Hersh, Lauren Eskelin, Lorraine Haughton-Lawson, Luke Neslage, Anne Swan, Anthony Sylvester and Andy Cohen.

== Cast ==
In June 2017, after the series' renewal, Nene Leakes announced she would return as a full-time housewife, following her departure following the seventh-season finale. In July, former housewife Kim Zolciak-Biermann announced she would return to the series in a recurring capacity, alongside newcomer Eva Marcille and Marlo Hampton returning in a recurring capacity. In September 2017, upon the announcement of the tenth season, it was announced that all of the housewives from the previous season, alongside the previously announced Leakes, would return as full-time housewives, with an exclusion of Phaedra Parks. Shamea Morton made numerous appearances throughout the season, along with original cast member, Lisa Wu.

== Episodes ==
The Real Housewives of Atlanta season 10 episodes
| No. overall | No. in season | Title | Original release date | Prod. code | U.S. viewers (millions) |
|---|---|---|---|---|---|
| 191 | 1 | "50 Shades of Cynthia" | November 5, 2017 | 1001 | 2.43 |
| 192 | 2 | "Say Yes to Distress" | November 12, 2017 | 1002 | 2.56 |
| 193 | 3 | "Chateau Get Down" | November 19, 2017 | 1003 | 2.20 |
| 194 | 4 | "All White Never Forget Showdown" | November 26, 2017 | 1004 | 2.11 |
| 195 | 5 | "Petty Party" | December 3, 2017 | 1005 | 2.31 |
| 196 | 6 | "All Aboard the Shady Express" | December 10, 2017 | 1006 | 2.64 |
| 197 | 7 | "Rock the Boat" | December 17, 2017 | 1007 | 2.34 |
| 198 | 8 | "A Mad Tea Party" | January 7, 2018 | 1008 | 2.27 |
| 199 | 9 | "The Peaches of Wrath" | January 14, 2018 | 1009 | 2.35 |
| 200 | 10 | "Storming Out" | January 21, 2018 | 1010 | 2.23 |
| 201 | 11 | "Tea Is of the Essence" | January 28, 2018 | 1011 | 1.99 |
| 202 | 12 | "Peaches Be Trippin'" | February 11, 2018 | 1012 | 2.24 |
| 203 | 13 | "Livin' la Villa Loca" | February 18, 2018 | 1013 | 2.13 |
| 204 | 14 | "Barcelona Breakdown" | February 25, 2018 | 1014 | 2.29 |
| 205 | 15 | "Let There Be Light and Love" | March 11, 2018 | 1015 | 2.00 |
| 206 | 16 | "Driving Miss Kim" | March 18, 2018 | 1016 | 2.07 |
| 207 | 17 | "ReMarcable" | March 25, 2018 | 1017 | 1.97 |
| 208 | 18 | "Nightmare on Peachtree Street" | April 1, 2018 | 1018 | 1.93 |
| 209 | 19 | "Reunion Part One" | April 8, 2018 | 1019 | 2.44 |
| 210 | 20 | "Reunion Part Two" | April 15, 2018 | 1020 | 2.53 |
| 211 | 21 | "Reunion Part Three" | April 22, 2018 | 1021 | 2.32 |
| 212 | 22 | "10th Anniversary Special" | April 29, 2018 | 1022 | 1.07 |
