= The Real Housewives of Atlanta season 8 =

Season of television series

The Real Housewives of Atlanta
- Season 8
- Cover used by the iTunes Store; Left to right: Williams, Burruss, Fields, Moore, Parks and Bailey
- Starring: Kandi Burruss; Cynthia Bailey; Phaedra Parks; Kenya Moore; Porsha Williams; Kim Fields
- No. of episodes: 21

Release
- Original network: Bravo
- Original release: November 8, 2015 – April 10, 2016

Season chronology
- ← Previous; Season 7 Next → Season 9

The eighth season of The Real Housewives of Atlanta, an American reality television series, was broadcast on Bravo. It aired from November 8, 2015, until April 10, 2016, and was primarily filmed in Atlanta, Georgia. Its executive producers are Lauren Eskelin, Lorraine Haughton, Glenda Hersh, Carlos King, Steven Weinstock, and Andy Cohen.

The Real Housewives of Atlanta focuses on the lives of Kandi Burruss, Cynthia Bailey, Phaedra Parks, Kenya Moore, Porsha Williams and Kim Fields. It consisted of twenty-one episodes.

This season marked the only appearance of Kim Fields.

== Production and crew ==
In June 2015, the network announced that The Real Housewives of Atlanta had been renewed for an eighth season. The trailer and the official cast were released on September 28, 2015. The season premiered with "The Shades of It All" on November 8, 2015, while the seventeenth episode "Who's Been Naughty, Who's Been Nice" served as the season finale, and was aired on April 10, 2016. It was followed by a three-part reunion that aired on March 20, March 27, and April 3, 2016, and "Secrets Revealed" that aired on April 10, 2016, which marked the conclusion of the season.

Lauren Eskelin, Lorraine Haughton, Glenda Hersh, Carlos King, and Steven Weinstock are served as the series' executive producers; it is produced and distributed by True Entertainment, an American subsidiary of the Dutch corporation Endemol.

This season began filming in August 2015 and wrapped in December 2015. The reunion was taped on February 25, 2016.

== Cast and synopsis ==
NeNe Leakes chose to leave the series prior shortly after season 7 to focus on other business ventures. Claudia Jordan was let go from the series after she allegedly declined being demoted to a recurring capacity. Along with Jordan and Leakes, Demetria McKinney also left the series as a recurring cast member. After Leakes' departure, the series became the first Real Housewives franchise to not retain any original cast members as full-time participants. Porsha Williams returned to being a full-time housewife once again, along with former The Facts of Life actress Kim Fields. Shereé Whitfield returned to the series but in a recurring capacity, along with new cast member Shamea Morton. Leakes, Jordan, McKinney, and former recurring cast member Marlo Hampton made guest appearances throughout the season.

Burruss gets some exciting news in regard to her pregnancy while Cynthia deals with not so exciting news in regard to a viral video. Kenya takes the first steps to building her home, who happens to be in the same street as Shereè. While Phaedra adjust to being a single mother as Apollo serves his sentence in prison. Kenya seeks the help of newcomer, Kim Fields, with her television Pilot, Life Twirls On and Porsha introduces her new boyfriend, Duke to the group. After last seasons divide between Kandi and Phaedra's friendship, the two meet to confront their issues. During a day on a boat, tensions collide leaving Cynthia and Porsha having physical altercation after the two have bumps in their personal relationships. The ladies take an all cast trip to Miami, along with Cynthia's friend Tammy McCall who clashes with Shereé over the past. During the trip, Kim is left feeling uncomfortable and Kenya is accused of stirring the pot. Porsha pursues a new man and 2 of the ladies return to Atlanta. After the trip, Kandi makes music with a friend, former recurring cast member Demetria McKinney. Kenya attempts to reunite with her family during a trip to Detroit. Phaedra hosts a trip to Washington D.C. for her Save Our Sons organization and invites some of the ladies to attend. Kandi pursues another business adventure involving Todd and NeNe Leakes returns to mend her friendship with Cynthia. The ladies and their partners, excluding Kandi, head to Jamaica for a getaway and to shoots Cynthia's eyewear commercial where Kim takes a directorial role. To everyone's surprise, NeNe attends. Still in Jamaica, tensions arise between Cynthia and Kenya over some things Kenya allegedly said. Kenya and her new man, Matt, have some time away from the ladies. A rift between Kim and Kenya, over things Kenya has been saying forces Cynthia to get involved. Back in Atlanta, Phaedra plans a journey with her sons to visit Apollo for the first time since he's been incarcerated. Kandi is left not knowing who she can trust after the federal agents come to her home in search of Apollo's assets. Porsha takes the first steps into preserving her fertility. Unseen footage of the season is shown during the reunion of Porsha engaging in another physical altercation outside of the final party.

== Episodes ==
The Real Housewives of Atlanta season 8 episodes
No. overall	No. in season	Title	Original release date	Prod. code	U.S. viewers (millions)
145	1	"The Shades of It All"	November 8, 2015	801	2.97
Kandi and Todd receive exciting news in the Season 8 premiere. Also: A viral video causes drama for Cynthia; Porsha's boyfriend visits; Phaedra adjusts to life as a single mother; and Cynthia throws an event to celebrate her eyewear line.
146	2	"Duking It Out"	November 15, 2015	802	3.09
Kenya seeks advice from newest housewife, actress-director Kim Fields about her TV pilot. Elsewhere, Cynthia struggles with a red-faced viral-video matter; Porsha introduces her new boyfriend at a surprise party; and Kandi tries to mend her friendship with Phaedra.
147	3	"Party in a Sweatbox"	November 22, 2015	803	2.62
Kenya tries to make amends with Sheree following fiery conflict at Cynthia's launch party. Meanwhile, Phaedra and Kandi have differing views on their friendship; Kim Fields meets the remaining ladies; and Kenya hosts a bash to launch her hair-care line. Former Cast Member Claudia makes an appearance.
148	4	"Rocky Boat Horror Story"	November 29, 2015	804	2.80
Kenya makes a surprise visit to Chateau Sheree and is astonished by what she discovers. Elsewhere, Cynthia reaches out to Kandi about her marriage; and Kenya hosts a day trip on a boat with the ladies, but Cynthia and Porsha make waves when they clash.
149	5	"Where is the Love Boat?"	December 6, 2015	805	2.99
A booze cruise turns dramatic when an argument between Cynthia and Porsha escalates. Back on land, the group continues to clash over the events. Meanwhile, Kandi visits the doctor and faces troubling news, and the ladies try to unite.
150	6	"Bienvenido a Miami"	December 13, 2015	806	3.02
Kenya and Porsha plan a girls trip to Miami as a "re-do" for their last outing. Porsha rents a yacht for all the ladies to enjoy a day out on the water. Cynthia's friend, Tammy joins the group on the weekend getaway, but clashes with Shereé over the past. A homesick Kim finds it hard to adjust to this new group ladies and sparks fly when Kenya is accused of stirring the rumor pot.
151	7	"Miami Spice"	December 20, 2015	807	2.86
Continuing in Miami, trouble arrives when a guest of the house takes the drama to new heights. Porsha goes on a steamy date with a hot new suitor. Two of the women decide to go back to Atlanta, leaving a small group to enjoy the Florida sun. Kim’s apprehension about Kenya is pushed to the limits, forcing her to question this newfound friendship.
152	8	"There's No Business Like Friend Business"	December 27, 2015	808	2.98
A long-distance romance continues for Porsha. Also, Kenya tries to woo a younger man; Peter and Cynthia's reconciliation progresses; and the ladies gather to celebrate Kandi's music collaboration with Demetria McKinney, but not without tense drama.
153	9	"Shade for Days"	January 3, 2016	809	3.04
Kenya takes her father to her dream home. Cynthia has her customer appreciation party for her eyewear, and drama flares up between Kandi and Porsha. Todd and Phaedra meet in her office to discuss a financial issue. Lastly, Kandi and Porsha has a dispute at lunch, but makes up at the end.
154	10	"Trouble on the Family Tree"	January 10, 2016	810	2.94
Kenya hosts a family reunion in Detroit and attempts reunite with her mother. Mama Joyces pays a surprising visit to Phaedra. Meanwhile, Cynthia goes on a romantic vacation with Peter. Todd and Phaedra try to settle their financial issue once and for all. Finally, Porsha has a management dispute with her sister Lauren.
155	11	"Ms. Parks Goes to Washington"	January 17, 2016	811	3.18
Phaedra gathers some of the girls to go on a trip to Washington, D.C. for her Save Our Sons organization. Kenya has a major blowout with her aunt following the family reunion. Elsewhere, NeNe returns to connect with Cynthia.
156	12	"Beauties & the Beat"	January 24, 2016	812	2.85
Kandi and Todd take a parenting class to prepare for their baby's arrival. Phaedra and Ayden try to see Apollo for his birthday. Meanwhile, Kim wants the girls to wear no makeup at a brunch. Cynthia prepares to create a commercial for her eyewear.
157	13	"Jamaican Beef Catty"	January 31, 2016	813	3.08
The ladies take a trip to Jamaica with their men. NeNe surprises the girls on the island and creates an immediate rift between Kenya and Cynthia’s friendship. Kenya is devastated when Cynthia cuts her out of her plans for her eyewear commercial. Kim gets heated when her directing credentials are questioned.
158	14	"Peaches of the Caribbean"	February 14, 2016	814	2.60
Cynthia is confronted by Kenya about what she said to the other ladies. Peter introduces the group to his family in Jamaica. Kenya and Matt stay behind at the resort for a bit of romance. NeNe tries to convince Kenya to hangout with the group. Kim is taken aback by the talk about her husband, leaving everyone in awe.
159	15	"Read School Is in Session"	February 21, 2016	815	3.17
Phaedra and NeNe offer Kim some advice on dealing with the rumours of her husband's sexuality. Back in Atlanta, Kandi and Todd attempt to convince Kandi's family to take part in the idea of their restaurant. Tensions in Jamaica begin to arise putting Cynthia in the middle of Kenya and Kim again.
160	16	"Turning Over a New Peach"	March 6, 2016	816	2.85
Kim is determined to focus on her directing whilst avoiding any more drama with Kenya. Kenya's Aunt Lori quizzes her about her new boyfriend, leaving Kenya questioning her future with him. Meanwhile, Porsha struggles with her sister/assistant Lauren when it comes to a photoshoot. Finally, Phaedra takes her two sons to visit Apollo for the first time since his incarceration.
161	17	"Who's Been Naughty, Who's Been Nice"	March 13, 2016	817	2.52
Phaedra focusing on looking to the future by throwing an extravagant holiday party. The Feds come to Kandi's house, leaving her questioning who she can trust. Porsha looks into preserving her fertility whilst Kenya and Matt begin a family of their own. A Christmas celebration brings everyone together for a final showdown.
162	18	"Reunion Part One"	March 20, 2016	818	3.01
Hosted by Andy Cohen, part one of the reunion brings the housewives together to rehash this season's events.
163	19	"Reunion Part Two"	March 27, 2016	819	2.78
Phaedra reflects on how she moved on after Apollo moved into prison; Cynthia and Peter disclose the state of their marriage; the women reflect on the Miami drama.
164	20	"Reunion Part Three"	April 3, 2016	820	2.81
The women rehash the drama from their trip to Jamaica; NeNe Leakes makes a special appearance with the group's concerns about Porsha's anger management issues; the men discuss Kim's husband, Chris.
165	21	"Secrets Revealed"	April 10, 2016	821	1.76
Previously-unreleased footage from the eighth season is broadcast.
