= The Real Housewives of Atlanta season 15 =

The Real Housewives of Atlanta
- Season 15
- Promotional poster via Peacock
- Starring: Shereé Whitfield; Kandi Burruss; Kenya Moore; Drew Sidora; Marlo Hampton; Sanya Richards-Ross
- No. of episodes: 18

Release
- Original network: Bravo
- Original release: May 7 – September 10, 2023

Season chronology
- ← Previous; Season 14 Next → Season 16

The fifteenth season of The Real Housewives of Atlanta, an American reality television series, was broadcast on Bravo, it premiered on May 7, 2023, and is primarily filmed in Atlanta, Georgia. Its executive producers are Steven Weinstock, Glenda Hersh, Lauren Eskelin, Lorraine Haughton-Lawson, Luke Neslage, Glenda Cox, Joye Chin, and Andy Cohen.

The Real Housewives of Atlanta focuses on the lives of Shereé Whitfield, Kandi Burruss, Kenya Moore, Drew Sidora, Marlo Hampton and Sanya Richards-Ross.

The season resulted in a near total recast of the show – only Sidora remained a full-time housewife for season 16, while Moore was suspended during filming. This season marked the third departure of Whitfield, the final appearances of Burruss, Hampton and Richards-Ross, and the final regular appearance of Moore.

== Cast ==
For the fifteenth season, all previous cast members returned, marking the first time since season 6 the cast remained unchanged. In addition to all main cast members and returning friend Monyetta Shaw-Carter, a new "friend of the housewives," Courtney Rhodes is introduced through her connection with Whitfield.

Many former cast members appear in cameos throughout the season; original cast members, DeShawn Snow, Lisa Wu and Kim Zolciak returned in guest capacities, along with long-time housewife, Cynthia Bailey. In addition to former housewives, Akilah Coleman (wife of Tevin Coleman) is also introduced as a guest through her connection with Moore.

== Production ==
Production for the season began at the start of October 2022 and concluded the following year at the end of January 2023. The first trailer was released on March 30, 2023. The reunion was taped on July 27, 2023.

In the original airing of "Rap Sheets and Old Beefs," a flashback to Season 4 is preceded by the title card featuring the cast at the time. NeNe Leakes is absent from the image, being edited out due to legal issues between her and the Bravo network. Backlash from viewers resulted in the episode being removed from streaming services and re-edited. The revised episode was reuploaded on the following Tuesday with the removal of the title card altogether.

== Episodes ==
The Real Housewives of Atlanta season 15 episodes
| No. overall | No. in season | Title | Original release date | U.S. viewers (millions) |
|---|---|---|---|---|
| 303 | 1 | "Who's Gonna Check My New Boo?" | May 7, 2023 | 0.83 |
Sanya throws a fortieth birthday bash for her husband, Ross. Shereé introduces her new beau to the group and his past history with Kenya comes up. Kandi almost comes to blows with a new friend. This episode marks the first appearance of Courtney as a supporting cast member. Drew is absent from this episode.
| 304 | 2 | "Sisters Before Misters" | May 14, 2023 | 0.74 |
Kenya and Shereé's boyfriend, Martell, get into an explosive argument. Drew returns from Chicago with plants to revive her music career as well as the spark in her marriage.
| 305 | 3 | "A Star is Re-Born" | May 21, 2023 | 0.77 |
Drew begins making moves to reinvigorate her music career by inviting the lady to a concert where she will be performing. Marlo gets upset that Kandi won't discuss the recent shooting that took place at Blaze. Candiace Dillard Bassett from The Real Housewives of Potomac makes a guest appearance in this episode.
| 306 | 4 | "The Buck Stops in Birmingham" | May 28, 2023 | 0.66 |
Kenya invites the ladies on a trip to Birmingham, AL to surprise them with a halftime performance at a Magic City football game. Sanya is trying to balance work and family in the wake of her brother-in-law/assistant quitting. Drew and Kandi are absent from this episode.
| 307 | 5 | "Drama for Yo Mama" | June 4, 2023 | 0.81 |
Due to a sudden health scare, Kenya has to cancel her halftime performance last minute. Marlo and Monyetta get into it over a door slam. Kandi confronts her mother for her comments about Todd at BravoCon.
| 308 | 6 | "Rap Sheets and Old Beefs" | June 11, 2023 | 0.92 |
Kandi and Marlo get into a heated exchange over a death in the family. Shereé gives the viewers a glimpse into her life as a new grandmother with the debut of her granddaughter, Mecca.
| 309 | 7 | "Keeping It Gucci" | June 18, 2023 | 0.79 |
Drew films a music video for her new single. Sanya has a sit down with Kandi to discuss where she stands between her and Marlo. The divide amongst the group inspires Shereé to host a brunch in an effort to bring everyone together.
| 310 | 8 | "Rollerskates and Blind Dates" | June 25, 2023 | 0.72 |
Shereé and Kandi step away from the group to privately hash out their issues. Drew's estranged sister comes in to town to watch her film her music video for her new single. Marlo's friend sets her up on a blind date.
| 311 | 9 | "Better Late Than Ugly" | July 9, 2023 | 0.84 |
| 312 | 10 | "Healing by Sheree" | July 16, 2023 | 0.89 |
| 313 | 11 | "Make Ups, Slip Ups and Cover Ups" | July 23, 2023 | 0.86 |
| 314 | 12 | "Sex, Lies and Video-Phones" | July 30, 2023 | 0.81 |
| 315 | 13 | "Peach Passion" | August 6, 2023 | 0.78 |
| 316 | 14 | "Wreck-It, Ralph" | August 13, 2023 | 0.78 |
| 317 | 15 | "Sip & Spill...the Tea" | August 20, 2023 | 0.89 |
| 318 | 16 | "Art Imitates Life" | August 27, 2023 | 0.79 |
| 319 | 17 | "Reunion Part 1" | September 3, 2023 | 0.83 |
| 320 | 18 | "Reunion Part 2" | September 10, 2023 | 0.99 |
