= The Real Housewives of Atlanta season 9 =

The Real Housewives of Atlanta
- Season 9
- Cover used by the iTunes Store; Left to right: Bailey, Burruss, Moore, Whitfield, Williams and Parks
- Starring: Shereé Whitfield; Kandi Burruss; Cynthia Bailey; Phaedra Parks; Kenya Moore; Porsha Williams
- No. of episodes: 25

Release
- Original network: Bravo
- Original release: November 6, 2016 – May 14, 2017

Season chronology
- ← Previous; Season 8 Next → Season 10

The ninth season of The Real Housewives of Atlanta, an American reality television series, is broadcast on Bravo. It aired on November 6, 2016, until May 14, 2017, and was primarily filmed in Atlanta, Georgia. Its executive producers are Steven Weinstock, Glenda Hersh, Lauren Eskelin, Lorraine Haughton-Lawson, Carlos King, Anne Swan, Anthony Sylvester and Andy Cohen.

The Real Housewives of Atlanta focuses on the lives of Shereé Whitfield, Kandi Burruss, Cynthia Bailey, Phaedra Parks, Kenya Moore and Porsha Williams.

This season marked the first departure of Phaedra Parks. She eventually returned for the show's 16th season.

== Production and crew ==
The Real Housewives of Atlanta was renewed for a ninth season in April 2016. On June 10, 2016, Kandi Burruss revealed that filming had begun by posting a photo through her newborn son's Instagram account. The trailer, official cast and premiere date were announced on September 28, 2016. The reunion was taped on March 16, 2017.

The season premiere "House of Shade and Dust" debuted on November 6, 2016. Steven Weinstock, Glenda Hersh, Lauren Eskelin, Lorraine Haughton-Lawson, Carlos King, Anne Swan and Anthony Sylvester alongside Andy Cohen are recognized as the series' executive producers; it is produced and distributed by True Entertainment, an American subsidiary of the Dutch corporation Endemol.

== Cast and synopsis ==
Five of the six wives featured on the eighth season returned for the ninth installment. Season 9 sees the departure of actress and one-season star, Kim Fields. During her time on Dancing with the Stars, Fields revealed that she would be departing the series. With the departure of Fields, season 9 sees the return of Shereè Whitfield in a full-time capacity. Whitfield previously appeared in a recurring capacity during season 8 and as a full-time cast member from seasons 1 through 4. In June 2016, prior to the official cast announcement, former cast member NeNe Leakes revealed she would be returning to season 9 in some capacity however in September 2016, Leakes later revealed that she had not been invited back or filmed any scenes. In the trailer for season 9, it is revealed that former housewives Kim Zolciak-Biermann and Lisa Wu would make a guest appearance in the season finale. Marlo Hampton and Shamea Morton would make guest appearances. Lena Danielle Chenier also made numerous guest appearances.

The season begins with Kenya Moore and Shereé Whitfield both continuing to work on their unfinished homes, Moore Manor and Chateau Shereé. With Phaedra Parks' husband, Apollo Nida, still serving his sentence in prison she continues on her journey of filing for divorce. Looking forward to the finalization of her divorce, Parks and fellow housewife Porsha Willams ponder on the idea of possibly dating. While Parks ponders a new relationship, Cynthia Bailey's marriage to Peter Thomas breaks down, leaving some hard decisions to be made. Kandi Burruss and her husband Todd Tucker face the challenges of parenting their newborn, Ace. Williams faces some self-reflection as she is forced to look in the mirror. As Moore reaches closer to finishing her home, she invites some of the ladies over to celebrate. At the party, Whitfield is left shocked by what she sees.

== Episodes ==
The Real Housewives of Atlanta season 9 episodes
No. overall	No. in season	Title	Original release date	Prod. code	U.S. viewers (millions)
166	1	"House of Shade and Dust"	November 6, 2016	901	2.59
Kandi and Todd face the struggles of parenting with newborn Ace, while Kenya and Shereé endeavor to completing their homes; Moore Manor and Chateau Sheree. With Apollo still in prison Phaedra considers dating, Cynthia's marriage breaks down and Porsha faces some self reflection, Later at Kenya's party, Shereé is left shocked by what she sees.
167	2	"Housewife House Wars"	November 13, 2016	902	2.65
Cynthia realizes her rocky marriage has affected her daughter; Kandi and Todd juggle launching an Ace-inspired product line and construction of the restaurant; Momma Joyce gossips about why Phaedra's divorce drags on; Porsha plans an outing.
168	3	"Ghosts of Boyfriends Past"	November 20, 2016	903	2.49
Kenya and Matt attend Matt's family reunion; Cynthia struggles with the idea of not being on good terms with Patricia; Bob tries to coax Shereé into going out on a date; Kandi receives a visit that makes her question what's best for her daughter.
169	4	"Another Spin Around the Block"	November 27, 2016	904	2.55
Phaedra unites the group for a worthy cause, but charity takes a backseat as Kenya and Shereé go at it again; Cynthia's daughter, Noelle, makes her modeling debut; Bob takes Shereé out on a romantic date; Kandi is taken aback by a telephone call.
170	5	"Shade Grenade"	December 4, 2016	905	2.74
Reeling from the news that her son has had a run-in with the law, Shereè leans on Bob for support; Kenya and Matt's relationship continues to spiral downward; After attending the Democratic National Convention in Philadelphia, Phaedra receives a disturbing telephone call that turns her world upside down.
171	6	"Tastes Like Trouble"	December 11, 2016	906	2.61
Cynthia's divorce takes a turn when Peter starts talking to the press; Porsha decides she is ready to buy her first house; Mama Joyce's choice of words leaves a bad taste in Phaedra's mouth; Kenya continues to struggle in her relationship with Matt.
172	7	"Model Behavior"	December 18, 2016	907	2.56
Phaedra calls Kandi to clear the air, but the conversation turns after Kandi reveals long-held secrets; Kairo explores a career in modeling; Porsha introduces Todd to her family; Cynthia waits to hear whether her offer on her dream home was accepted.
173	8	"Bosom Buddies"	January 1, 2017	908	2.28
Juicy details about Kandi and Phaedra's disastrous lunch spreads, then new accusations about Kandi and Shamea are made; Shereé deals with the cost of having expensive taste; Porsha takes an unusual exercise class to help spice up her new relationship.
174	9	"Char-lotta Drama"	January 8, 2017	909	2.60
Kenya is invited to host Peter's grand opening of Club One in Charlotte, N.C.; Kandi feels betrayed by a former employee; Shereé prepares to drop a tell-all novel based on her life; Peter's grand opening gets derailed by a few surprise visitors.
175	10	"Uncharitable Behavior"	January 15, 2017	910	2.63
Kenya returns to discover her estranged boyfriend vandalized Moore Manor again; Phaedra reveals secrets about her marriage while giving advice to Kenya; Cynthia and Noelle move out of the townhouse they shared with Peter.
176	11	"Thelma and Louise Take Flint"	January 22, 2017	911	2.47
Phaedra and Kenya rekindle their friendship as they travel to Flint, Michigan, to participate in Phaedra's summer camp; Cynthia makes herself at home in Kandi's house; Porsha starts seeing red flags in her relationship with Todd.
177	12	"Into The Woods"	January 29, 2017	912	2.62
Phaedra and Kenya want to move forward with their plans for a glamping trip; Cynthia meets with Matt to get to the bottom of his anger issues; Kandi throws a surprise engagement party for Shamea, during which Sheree spills some tea.
178	13	"If These Woods Could Talk"	February 12, 2017	913	2.25
The ladies reach the woods of Georgia for a weekend of 'glamping', but they're stunned to learn they must spend the first night sleeping; Marlo confronts Kenya over unresolved business; The women come over outdoor activities; Kandi learns of the rumors being spread about her.
179	14	"Loose Lips Sink Ships"	February 19, 2017	914	2.60
The ladies come back to Atlanta taking after the dramatic end to their glamping getaway. Additionally: Cynthia arranges her fashion show; Porsha gives Todd an ultimatum; Phaedra gets news about her divorce; Kandi and Porsha meet in an effort to settle their unresolved issues.
180	15	"Lei It All on the Table"	March 5, 2017	915	2.59
Porsha's allegations are transferred by Kandi while Porsha spills subtle elements to her sister; Kenya gets an unexpected visit; Kandi and Todd arrange a couples' getaway to Maui; Porsha gets a day of beauty treatments; Sheree tries to lay everything out in the open, yet her endeavors blowback.
181	16	"Maui Mayhem"	March 12, 2017	916	2.65
A first dinner in Maui turns ugly when Kandi and Porsha clash over blame for salacious rumors. Also, Kandi plans a speed-boat adventure (without Porsha); Sheree's courtship hits obstacles; and Phaedra organizes an emergency "restoration service."
182	17	"Aloha & Goodbye"	March 19, 2017	917	2.48
A roast of Peter is planned after Phaedra's effort to reunite the group fails. Also: Sheree must decide on a life with or without Bob; Cynthia comes to terms with the end of her marriage; Kenya and Phaedra's newfound friendship is tested when Kenya hosts a divorce party.
183	18	"Baby Nups & Breakups"	March 26, 2017	918	2.64
The ladies return from a Hawaiian getaway. Here, Cynthia shows her strength to the Atlanta fashionistas; momager Sheree tries to interfere; Kandi plans a restaurant preview; Porsha is willing to take her relationship to the next level; Matt resurfaces.
184	19	"Side Dishes and Side Pieces"	April 2, 2017	919	2.58
Kandi and Todd scramble to launch Old Lady Gang restaurant. Also, dramas center on Cynthia's divorce; Phaedra's birthday is celebrated; and the ladies gather at a preview event, but an unforeseen guest arrives, leading to revelations about a divorce.
185	20	"Chateau She Did That"	April 9, 2017	920	2.69
In the season finale, Sheree throws a housewarming party to unveil Chateau Shereé; Kenya finds herself going toe-to-toe with Kim Zolciak-Biermann who makes a dramatic return to the group; Phaedra lands a helping hand to Kandi's former disgruntled employee; Porsha visits her father's resting.
186	21	"Reunion Part One"	April 16, 2017	921	2.80
The historic four-part reunion kicks off and things get heated when Kenya and Shereé go head-to-head in a battle of the baseboards, addressing the drama surrounding building their dream homes. Phaedra and Kenya discuss the highs and lows of their friendship to determine if there is any hope at saving their rocky relationship. Tensions rise when Kenya questions the effectiveness of Porsha's anger management, which leads to a fiery verbal encounter between Kandi and Porsha.
187	22	"Reunion Part Two"	April 23, 2017	922	2.95
Kenya reflects on her complicated relationship with Matt; Phaedra discusses the status of her divorce; Shereé calls out Kenya for constantly adding fuel to the fire; Shereé reveals heartbreaking details about her tumultuous marriage to Bob.
188	23	"Reunion Part Three"	April 30, 2017	923	2.76
The men weigh in on the drama of the season; Cynthia and Peter reveal what life has been like after their divorce; Shamea confronts her best friend, Porsha; the conversation turns to issues surrounding "Lesbiangate."
189	24	"Reunion Part Four"	May 7, 2017	924	3.15
The women discuss the aftermath of the "Lesbiangate" drama; cameras capture behind-the-scenes moments, tears and tense conversations as the women try to recover from a painful realization to see if there is any chance of moving forward.
190	25	"Secrets Revealed"	May 14, 2017	925	1.47
Previously-unreleased footage from the ninth season is broadcast.
