= The Real Housewives of Atlanta season 14 =

The Real Housewives of Atlanta
- Season 14
- Cover used by the iTunes Store; Left to right: Whitfield, Sidora, Moore, Hampton, Burruss and Richards-Ross
- Starring: Shereé Whitfield; Kandi Burruss; Kenya Moore; Drew Sidora; Marlo Hampton; Sanya Richards-Ross
- No. of episodes: 20

Release
- Original network: Bravo
- Original release: May 1 – September 25, 2022

Season chronology
- ← Previous; Season 13 Next → Season 15

The fourteenth season of The Real Housewives of Atlanta, an American reality television series, was broadcast on Bravo, it premiered on May 1, 2022, and is primarily filmed in Atlanta, Georgia. Its executive producers are Steven Weinstock, Glenda Hersh, Lauren Eskelin, Lorraine Haughton-Lawson, Luke Neslage, Glenda Cox, Joye Chin, and Andy Cohen.

The Real Housewives of Atlanta focuses on the lives of Shereé Whitfield, Kandi Burruss, Kenya Moore, Drew Sidora, Marlo Hampton and Sanya Richards-Ross.

== Cast ==
For the fourteenth season, three of the five cast members from the previous season returned. Long-running housewives, Cynthia Bailey and Porsha Williams announced their departures from the series in September 2021. Kandi Burruss, Kenya Moore, and Drew Sidora returned, along with Marlo Hampton being promoted to a full-time cast member.

Shereé Whitfield also returned to the series for a third time, after her last appearance in the show's tenth season. Additionally, four-time Olympic gold medalist in track and field, mom, wife, and businesswoman, Sanya Richards-Ross joined the cast as a Housewife, while Monyetta Shaw-Carter is introduced as a "friend of the housewives" through her connection with Burruss.

Original cast members, DeShawn Snow and Lisa Wu, returned as guests throughout the season, along with Fatum Alford being introduced as a guest through her connection with Whitfield.

== Production ==
Production for the season began in October 2021 and concluded the following year in February 2022. The first trailer was released on March 30, 2022.

== Episodes ==
The Real Housewives of Atlanta season 14 episodes
No. overall	No. in season	Title	Original release date	U.S. viewers (millions)
283	1	"The Edge of Fashion"	May 1, 2022	0.93
284	2	"All Aboard the Gaslight Express"	May 8, 2022	0.74
285	3	"The Tea Is Served"	May 15, 2022	0.85
286	4	"Big Apple Squabbles"	May 22, 2022	0.99
287	5	"She by Herself"	June 5, 2022	0.81
288	6	"Don't Be Sea Salty"	June 12, 2022	1.01
289	7	"Who Gon Check on Me, Boo?"	June 19, 2022	0.83
290	8	"Healthy Glows and Low Blows"	June 26, 2022	0.72
291	9	"Midnight in the Chateau of Good & Evil"	July 10, 2022	0.94
292	10	"Guess Who's Coming to Blue Ridge"	July 17, 2022	0.92
293	11	"Cabin Fever"	July 24, 2022	0.99
294	12	"Trust (Planning) Issues"	July 31, 2022	1.02
295	13	"A Rum Punch to the Gut"	August 7, 2022	1.03
296	14	"Montego Baes"	August 14, 2022	0.97
297	15	"Not Michelle Obama"	August 21, 2022	1.01
298	16	"It's Expensive to Be She"	August 28, 2022	0.96
299	17	"A Fashion Show With Fashions"	September 4, 2022	1.04
300	18	"Reunion Part 1"	September 11, 2022	1.03
301	19	"Reunion Part 2"	September 18, 2022	1.05
302	20	"Reunion Part 3"	September 25, 2022	1.13
