= The Real Housewives of Atlanta season 6 =

Season of television series

The Real Housewives of Atlanta
- Season 6
- Cover used by the iTunes Store; Left to right: Parks, Bailey, Moore, Leakes, Williams and Burruss
- Starring: NeNe Leakes; Kandi Burruss; Cynthia Bailey; Phaedra Parks; Kenya Moore; Porsha Williams
- No. of episodes: 27

Release
- Original network: Bravo
- Original release: November 3, 2013 – May 18, 2014

Season chronology
- ← Previous; Season 5 Next → Season 7

The sixth season of The Real Housewives of Atlanta, an American reality television series, was broadcast on Bravo. It aired from November 3, 2013, until May 18, 2014. It was primarily filmed in Atlanta, Georgia, with additional footage in Alabama; Savannah, Georgia; Athens, Georgia; and Mexico. Its executive producers were Lauren Eskelin, Lorraine Haughton, Glenda Hersh, Carlos King, and Steven Weinstock.

The Real Housewives of Atlanta focuses on the lives of Cynthia Bailey, Kandi Burruss, NeNe Leakes, Kenya Moore, Phaedra Parks and Porsha Williams. During the season, the women (particularly Parks and Williams) frequently clash with Moore, while Burruss becomes engaged to her boyfriend Todd Tucker, and Williams deals with her ongoing divorce from Kordell Stewart. It comprised 26 episodes, all of which aired on Sunday evenings at 8:00 pm.

The season received generally favorable reviews from contemporary critics, who appreciated the growing tension among the Housewives. It received widespread media attention for broadcasting physical altercations between Parks' husband Apollo Nida and Moore's assistant Brandon Deshazer, in addition to a later incident involving Williams and Moore. As of February 2014, the series is the highest-rated installment of The Real Housewives franchise, and it is the most-watched series airing on Bravo. Despite not being released to DVD, the season was made available for purchase through the iTunes Store.

This season marked the first departure of Porsha Williams. She eventually returned for the show's 8th season.

== Production and crew ==
The Real Housewives of Atlanta was officially renewed for its sixth season on April 2, 2013, while its trailer was released on October 17, 2013. The season premiere "Bye Bye With the Wind" was aired on November 3, 2013, while the twenty-second episode "Final Curtain Call" served as the season finale, and was aired on April 13, 2014. It was followed by a three-part reunion special, which aired in separate installments on April 20, April 27, and May 4. The twenty-seventh episode "Husbands Revealed" marked the conclusion of the season; it consisted of the husbands discussing the season, and was broadcast on May 18, 2014. Lauren Eskelin, Lorraine Haughton, Glenda Hersh, Carlos King, and Steven Weinstock are recognized as the series' executive producers; it is produced and distributed by True Entertainment, an American subsidiary of the Italian corporation Endemol.

== Cast and synopsis ==
With the exception of Kim Zolciak-Biermann, who departed midway through the fifth season, all six wives from the remaining episodes of the fifth season returned for the sixth season. Cynthia Bailey continues raising her teenage daughter Noelle, while Kandi Burruss becomes engaged to her boyfriend Todd Tucker and begins planning her debut musical A Mother's Love. NeNe Leakes returns to Atlanta after living in Hollywood the previous year, and readjusts to married life after remarrying her ex-husband Gregg. Kenya Moore fights an eviction notice from her landlord, and takes an interest learning about her earlier years. Phaedra Parks continues preparing for her mortician's license shortly after giving birth to her second child, although she frequently finds herself in conflict with her husband Apollo Nida, who is additionally renovating their property. Porsha Williams is in the midst of divorce proceedings from Kordell Stewart, and struggles to regain her independence after their marriage.

== Reception ==
=== Critical reception ===
The sixth season of The Real Housewives of Atlanta received generally favorable reviews from contemporary critics. Writing for Entertainment Weekly, Andrew Asare commented that "we're in for quite a season [of] divorce, strained relationships, and tested marriages and friendships" after the premiere episode. Danielle Henderson from Vulture stated that "it's the first episode of the season and I'm already riveted". Lauren Weigle from Heavy stated that "Kenya continues to twirl, Porsha gets wild in the club, Peter's club 'Bar One' goes under, Apollo and Phaedra have marital issues, Kandi and her mother are at odds over Kandi's wedding, and more. Kandi's mother accuses Kandi's fiance of having an affair with Kandi's friend. Nene calls Porsha a bad friend. Somehow Porsha ends up in the hospital. Fist fights ensue," and summarized her review by acknowledging that "this season is going to be crazy." However, Jodi Walker from Entertainment Weekly later criticized the series for insisting its disapproval of violence, despite its widespread promotion of the fight between Williams and Moore and ultimate decision to broadcast the altercation. In April 2014, Bravo renewed The Real Housewives of Atlanta for a seventh season, and additionally announced the spin-off series The Real Housewives of Atlanta: Kandi's Wedding.

=== U.S. television ratings ===
The premiere episode "Bye Bye With the Wind" attracted 3.1 million viewers in its initial broadcast on November 3, 2013. It later became tied with the fifth episode "Save the Drama For Mama", aired on December 1, 2013, for the least-watched episodes of the season. However, it reached its peak viewership with the fourteenth episode "Peaches Divided", which was broadcast to 4.63 million viewers on February 9, 2014. The season finale "Final Curtain Call" attracted 3.81 million viewers in its initial broadcast on April 13, 2014. As of February 2014, The Real Housewives of Atlanta is the highest-rated installment of The Real Housewives franchise, and is additionally the most-watched series airing on Bravo.

== Controversy ==
The 13th and 14th episodes ("Pillow Talk or Pillow Fight" and "Peaches Divided", respectively) garnered significant media attention for broadcasting physical altercations among several of the cast members. Leakes and Moore found themselves in the midst of a heated verbal argument, while Parks' husband Apollo Nida and Moore's assistant Brandon Deshazer engaged in a physical fight. Burruss was later angered by false allegations spread about Tucker and notably delivered the line, "I will drag you in this, bitch!" to Malorie Bailey, Cynthia Bailey's sister, as she was pulled away from the incident. Rodney Ho from The Atlanta Journal-Constitution acknowledged the situation as "one of the most violent fights in the six-year history of the program", while Bailey commented on Watch What Happens: Live: "I've been on this show for four years and never, ever in the history of the whole show has anyone laid hands on each other."

While filming the reunion special at the Atlanta Biltmore Hotel on March 27, Moore implied that Williams was unfaithful during her marriage; after Williams called Moore a "slut from the '90s" and Moore yelled that Williams was "a dumb ho" from a megaphone, Williams dragged Moore across the floor by her hair. Moore was initially unable to complete a police statement because she was required to complete the reunion filming, although Williams was arrested and booked for misdemeanor battery on April 18. Moore later threatened to quit the series if Williams were to remain, commenting: "we've become angry with each other, we've threatened each other and gone to the edge. But at the end of the day, we know there's a line." Earlier in December 2013, Williams received additional criticism for comments made during the eighth episode, "Ghosts of Girlfriends Past", wherein she indicated that she believed the Underground Railroad was an actual railroad line.

== Episodes ==
The Real Housewives of Atlanta season 6 episodes
No. overall	No. in season	Title	Original release date	Prod. code	U.S. viewers (millions)
93	1	"Bye Bye With the Wind"	November 3, 2013	601	3.10
Kandi expresses hesitation in planning her nuptials with her fiancé Todd, while NeNe is uninterested in befriending Kenya. Meanwhile, Phaedra clashes with her husband Apollo over their differing view on parenting their newborn son and Porsha deals with her divorce from Kordell. Cynthia prepares the moving of her modeling agency to her husband's bar.
94	2	"Girl Code Breakers"	November 10, 2013	602	3.33
Cynthia discloses her long-term health struggles, and Kandi's mother Mama Joyce expresses her distaste for Todd. NeNe criticizes Kenya for inappropriately texting Apollo, while Kenya herself looks to have her eviction dismissed. Meanwhile, Porsha moves in with her mother.
95	3	"All in a Day's Twerk"	November 17, 2013	603	3.69
Kandi learns that her business partner Don Juan is suspicious of Todd, while Cynthia prepares for her impending surgery. NeNe manages after her television series The New Normal is cancelled, while Phaedra coordinates a family photoshoot. Meanwhile, Porsha becomes acquainted with living with her mother as Kenya leaves her rental property.
96	4	"Too Late to Apollo-Gize"	November 24, 2013	604	3.29
Cynthia learns that her daughter Noelle has begun dating while recuperating after her fibroid surgery. NeNe assists Kenya in looking for a new residence, while Phaedra tries to resolve the texting controversy with Apollo during a dinner date. Meanwhile, Porsha strengthens her relationships with the housewives.
97	5	"Save the Drama For Mama"	December 1, 2013	605	3.10
The conflict between Mama Joyce and Todd heightens, while Porsha's sister Lauren insists that she finds her own residence. After Phaedra travels to Alabama in preparation for her mortuary exam, Cynthia's husband Peter guides Apollo in remedying their struggles.
98	6	"The Old Lady and the Shoe"	December 8, 2013	606	3.77
Cynthia has "the talk" with Noelle after learning of her first boyfriend. Kandi begins planning her wedding with the understanding that Mama Joyce and Todd are working towards a reconciliation; however, she is plagued by speculation that he is having an affair with her friend Carmon, and her wedding dress appointment ends with an argument between her family. NeNe learns of Phaedra and Kandi's previous relationships with the assistance of a new companion, while Kenya reflects on the possibility of motherhood. Meanwhile, Phaedra returns home from Alabama as Apollo fails to acknowledge his wrongdoing in the texting conflict, and Porsha is admitted into the hospital in light of the building stress the divorce has placed on her.
99	7	"Savann-No"	December 15, 2013	607	3.47
Before leaving for a group vacation to Savannah, Cynthia and Mama Joyce unexpectedly visit Kandi and Phaedra, respectively. Kenya sparks a conflict with the women before their departure, while Porsha separates herself from Kordell by shopping without his credit card.
100	8	"Ghosts of Girlfriends Past"	December 22, 2013	608	3.67
The housewives begin their vacation in Savannah, where Phaedra clashes with NeNe's friend Mynique. Later that evening, they learn of previous relationships between some of the housewives and Mynique's husband Chuck Smith.
101	9	"Midnight in the Garden of Tea and Shade"	December 29, 2013	609	3.82
Cynthia finds herself in the midst of a meltdown after an intense argument with NeNe over their differing parenting styles. The housewives attend a drag show and share a home-cooked dinner together before leaving Savannah, although an argument ensues when an unexpected visitor arrives.
102	10	"A Trip Down Memory Lane"	January 5, 2014	610	4.51
Kandi meets with Mama Joyce after several weeks with no communication, where the latter reveals health problems. Chuck invites NeNe and Phaedra to an event being hosted in Athens, although he and Phaedra argue over the truth regarding their previous relationship.
103	11	"Crunk in the Trunk"	January 12, 2014	611	4.18
The housewives gather for a jewelry trunk show being hosted by Cynthia's sister Malorie. During the event, NeNe receives unexpected news, and Kenya and Malorie find themselves in the midst of a feud.
104	12	"Sour Grapes, Sour Peaches"	January 19, 2014	612	3.69
Kandi secures a hosting venue for her musical A Mother's Love, while NeNe repairs her friendship with Porsha after their argument at Malorie's trunk show. However, the housewives find themselves in the midst of conflict during an outing to a wine vineyard.
105	13	"Pillow Talk or Pillow Fight"	January 26, 2014	613	3.91
A physical altercation erupts during a pajama party NeNe coordinated.
106	14	"Peaches Divided"	February 9, 2014	614	4.63
The pajama party continues as Apollo attacks Kenya's friend Brandon. Meanwhile, Kandi becomes outraged with party-goers Natalie and Christopher Williams over defamatory comments made against Todd, and tensions escalate after Cynthia and Peter intervene. The following day, the housewives gather for a spa outing, although NeNe and Kenya engage in an intense argument over the happenings of the evening.
107	15	"Dropping the Ball"	February 16, 2014	615	4.06
Kandi and Todd discover that Mama Joyce has continuously interfered with their relationship, while Kenya arranges a charity masquerade ball. Porsha tries to launch an acting career by auditioning for a position in A Mother's Love.
108	16	"Twirling With the Enemy"	February 23, 2014	616	4.04
Cynthia continues planning a surprise birthday party for Peter, although she is concerned that her friendship with NeNe will be damaged after she and Peter had an argument at the masquerade ball. At a later "Bailey Bowl" fitness event she arranged, NeNe severs connections with her friend Marlo Hampton in light of her new-found friendship with Kenya. Kenya talks to NeNe about her behavior at the masquerade ball, and invites the housewives on a vacation in Mexico. NeNe later gives acting advice to Porsha in preparation for her confirmed role in A Mother's Love.
109	17	"He Said, She Said"	March 9, 2014	617	3.91
NeNe and Phaedra reluctantly follow through with their group vacation, while Marlo and Kenya become close companions. In Mexico, Peter badgers Porsha with details regarding her marriage.
110	18	"Flirting With Disaster"	March 16, 2014	618	4.30
Kenya unexpectedly confronts Apollo during a guys' night out in Mexico, intending to resolve their strained relationship.
111	19	"Mexi-Loco"	March 23, 2014	619	4.26
Phaedra is angered to learn of Apollo and Kenya's conversation. Meanwhile, an altercation nearly breaks out between Peter and NeNe's husband Gregg, while a verbal argument erupts among the housewives as Kenya hosts a "re-do" Pillow Talk gathering. Upon learning of the men's confrontation, NeNe and Peter find themselves in the midst of another conflict.
112	20	"With Friends Like These"	March 30, 2014	620	3.94
The group returns to Atlanta, and Kandi questions her decision to include Porsha in A Mother's Love. Cynthia, Peter, NeNe, and Gregg reflect on their blowout in Mexico, while Kenya and Marlo discuss the happenings on the trip.
113	21	"Mess Rehearsal"	April 6, 2014	621	3.66
During rehearsals for A Mother's Love, Mama Joyce and Todd discuss their troubled relationship. Kenya recovers after the death of her dog Velvet, while Porsha records a single.
114	22	"Final Curtain Call"	April 13, 2014	622	3.81
Initial ticket sales for A Mother's Love are slower than expected, while NeNe experiences medical pains after returning from a recent trip. Phaedra prepares for her final mortuary exams, and Apollo expresses his concern with their relationship.
115	23	"Reunion Part 1"	April 20, 2014	623	4.13
Andy Cohen and the housewives discuss the ongoing controversies involving Kenya, with particular attention placed on the feud between Porsha and Kenya.
116	24	"Reunion Part 2"	April 27, 2014	624	4.14
Andy and the housewives reflect on the outcome of Porsha and Kenya's altercation. Mama Joyce shares her current feelings on Kandi and Todd's relationship, while Cynthia and NeNe discuss their strained friendship.
117	25	"Reunion Part 3"	May 4, 2014	625	4.29
The housewives' husbands are brought into the discussion, while Kenya and NeNe continue to clash.
118	26	"Secrets Revealed"	May 11, 2014	626-90	1.79
Previously-unreleased footage from the season is broadcast.
119	27	"Husbands Revealed"	May 18, 2014	627	2.12
The housewives' husbands are gathered to discuss talking points from the season.
