= The Real Housewives of Atlanta season 7 =

The Real Housewives of Atlanta
- Season 7
- Cover used by the iTunes Store; Left to right: Bailey, Parks, Jordan, Burruss, Leakes and Moore
- Starring: NeNe Leakes; Kandi Burruss; Cynthia Bailey; Phaedra Parks; Kenya Moore; Claudia Jordan
- No. of episodes: 25

Release
- Original network: Bravo
- Original release: November 9, 2014 – May 10, 2015

Season chronology
- ← Previous; Season 6 Next → Season 8

The seventh season of The Real Housewives of Atlanta, an American reality television series, was broadcast on Bravo. It aired from November 9, 2014, until May 10, 2015, and was primarily filmed in Atlanta, Georgia. Its executive producers are Lauren Eskelin, Lorraine Haughton, Glenda Hersh, Carlos King, Steven Weinstock, and Andy Cohen.

The Real Housewives of Atlanta focuses on the lives of NeNe Leakes, Kandi Burruss, Cynthia Bailey, Phaedra Parks, Kenya Moore and Claudia Jordan. It consisted of twenty-five episodes.

This season marked the first departure of original housewife NeNe Leakes. She eventually returned for the show's 10th season. It also marked the final and only regular appearance of Claudia Jordan.

== Production and crew ==
The Real Housewives of Atlanta was officially renewed for its seventh season on April 8, 2014, while its trailer was released on October 1, 2014. The season premiered on November 9, 2014.

The season premiered with "Bye Bye and Bon Voyage" on November 9, 2014, while the twenty-second episode "Atlanta Twirls On" served as the season finale, and was aired on April 19, 2015. It was followed by a three-part reunion that aired on April 26, May 3, and May 10, 2015, which marked the conclusion of the season. Lauren Eskelin, Lorraine Haughton, Glenda Hersh, Carlos King, and Steven Weinstock are recognized as the series' executive producers; it is produced and distributed by True Entertainment, an American subsidiary of the Italian corporation Endemol.

A week after the final episode of season 7, May 17, 2015, the fifth spin-off to The Real Housewives of Atlanta premiered on Bravo, titled Kandi's Ski Trip once again starring Kandi Burruss. The three-part television special follows Burruss, her husband Todd Tucker and their blended family as they go to a ski trip together. The series received relatively high ratings.

=== U.S. television ratings ===
The season's premiere episode "Bye Bye and Bon Voyage" attracted over 3.8 million viewers during its initial broadcast on November 9, 2014, including 2.2 million viewers in the 18–49 demographic via Nielsen ratings. It marked as the most watched season premiere ever to air on Bravo.

== Cast and synopsis ==
In June 2014, it was reported that all of the cast members from the previous season would return to the show, including NeNe Leakes, Kandi Burruss, Cynthia Bailey, Phaedra Parks, Kenya Moore and Porsha Williams. It was later confirmed that radio and television personality Claudia Jordan had officially signed on to be a full-time housewife, while singer-actress Demetria McKinney would have a supporting role. Bravo released the cast photo of the upcoming season a month before its premiere with all the housewives excluding Williams, meaning that she was demoted to a recurring role. The casting decision was met with surprise among the other cast members; Andy Cohen later addressed the decision, explaining that "it was about the amount of story we got from Porsha this season," also adding that they initially wanted her to be a full-time cast member but "haven't gotten enough to merit that."

== Episodes ==
The Real Housewives of Atlanta season 7 episodes
No. overall	No. in season	Title	Original release date	Prod. code	U.S. viewers (millions)
120	1	"Bye Bye and Bon Voyage"	November 9, 2014	701	3.83
NeNe travels to Vegas where she joins the cast of "Zumanity," cabaret-style show by Cirque du Soleil. Phaedra and her husband Apollo prepare for the sentence day. Both Kenya and Porsha open up about the aftermath of the physical altercation which happened during the taping of the reunion show last season. Cynthia tries to juggle between her personal life and upcoming business adventures. Kandi and her husband Todd prepare for welcoming his daughter, Kaela, to live with them.
121	2	"No Moore Apollogies"	November 16, 2014	702	3.60
NeNe gets very nervous as she is about to perform in her first show as a host of "Zumanity" in Vegas. The tension between Phaedra and Apollo continues when he shows up to Ayden's first dentist appointment uninvited. Kandi decides to buy her mother a new house and both of them sit down to talk about her and Todd. Cynthia throws a party and purposely does not invite several of the housewives. Later on, Apollo joins the party and confronts Kenya about their alleged romantic past.
122	3	"All Tea All Shade"	November 23, 2014	703	3.14
The show officially introduces the newest housewife, a radio personality Claudia Jordan, who happens to be Kenya's good friend. NeNe comes back to Atlanta from her show in Las Vegas and familiarizes with all the drama that have happened while she was away. Kandi gets in between Apollo and Phaedra's relationship as she decides to tell her the truth about Apollo and Kenya. Cynthia confronts Porsha over the comments she has made about her deteriorating friendship with Nene.
123	4	"Bury The Ratchet"	November 30, 2014	704	2.86
Things get a bit tense at the Kandi Factory when Todd confronts Kandi and her staff with reprimands. Phaedra tries to deal with Apollo's decisions while he meets up with Peter and opens up about his relationship with Phaedra. Claudia feels shaded after getting acquainted with Porsha at work. Kenya breaks down in tears after a conversation with Kandi about Apollo's confessions. NeNe speaks up about the relationship with her fellow housewives and questions Kenya's innocence.
124	5	"Friend Or Faux"	December 7, 2014	705	3.06
Claudia tries to get comfortable in her new home in Atlanta with Kenya's help and opens up about her family past. Kandi discovers her house to be in an alarming condition as she plans to sell it. Kandi organizes a dinner party to gather all the housewives so they could confront each other about all the drama. The aftermath of Apollo's confessions continues while NeNe and Cynthia come face to face and discuss their relationship for the first time since the reunion show.
125	6	"Make-ups And Breakdowns"	December 14, 2014	706	2.80
Phaedra tries to avoid Apollo's drama by getting back to work, starting with a case involving Derek J., who was accused of stealing his customer's weave. Cynthia and NeNe continue trying to establish their relationship. Kandi and Todd visit his mother Sharon in New York who confronts Kandi about the allegations made by Mama Joyce and force her to defend herself and her mother. Cynthia is also in New York to walk in a runway show for her friend's line during New York Fashion Week.
126	7	"Nice To Metria"	December 21, 2014	707	2.82
NeNe is about to go live for promoting her clothing collection. Cynthia gets back to New York and begins collaborating with a singer/actress Demetria McKinney, which marks her first appearance on the show. Kenya is eager to get back to the show business and meets a producer Roger Bobb who also happens to be dating McKinney. Apollo confronts Phaedra face-to-face about their marital issues during Demetria's music video debut party. Things get tense between Kandi and her mother.
127	8	"Tea With A Side Of Squashed Beef"	December 28, 2014	708	3.16
Kandi and Todd try to build up more peaceful relations between the members of their blending family. Kenya starts looking for new office space to help with the launch of her new ambitious business plans. Claudia welcomes her mother and grandmother who come to visit her in Atlanta to have some fun. NeNe invites both Cynthia and Kenya to sit down with her and Porsha and get all the things straight between them. Phaedra starts preparing to start a new life as a single parent.
128	9	"50 Shades Of Shade"	January 4, 2015	709	3.35
Phaedra tries to move on with her life both professionally and personally and deals with Apollo while living under the same roof until he is set to go to jail. Cynthia and Peter explore the options of potential new location for Bar One and starts their journey of doing business together. Kandi throws a sex and relationship party and invites all the ladies which concludes with a surprising statement blaming one of the husbands of being unfaithful; NeNe finally gets to know Claudia better.
129	10	"Puerto Read-co!"	January 11, 2015	710	3.53
The ladies take their first of the cast trips as the venture to Puerto Rico. The drama between NeNe and Claudia continues as their conversation gets heated leaving both of them in a battle of words.
130	11	"Divide And "ki-ki""	January 18, 2015	711	3.19
NeNe and Claudia come to a conclusion of their disagreement at the dinner table, and the ladies are left completely divided in its wake. Kandi hosts a beach party hoping that it would bring all the ladies back together.
131	12	"Beauties in the Fast Lane"	January 25, 2015	712	3.44
Both Kenya and Claudia join Cynthia to attend a road trip to Charlotte, where women reunite with Kordell Stewart. Kandi and Todd discuss their future and visit a doctor.
132	13	"The Countdown Begins"	February 8, 2015	713	2.62
Kandi deals with the aftermath of "A Mother's Love" tour cancellation. Kenya wants to get back to her producing/acting career. Claudia and Porsha talk their issues.
133	14	"Hello Mr. Chocolate"	February 15, 2015	714	2.85
Apollo meets up with Peter and opens up about his and Phaedra's falling relationship. Kenya starts casting for her new TV show. Apollo talks face-to-face with Phaedra for the last time before heading to prison.
134	15	"Chocolate Does A Body Good"	March 1, 2015	715	3.74
During a dinner party, things get heated as Kenya and Cynthia confront Phaedra about her allegedly cheating on Apollo.
135	16	"Southern Discomfort"	March 8, 2015	716	3.60
Kandi and Todd decide to do marriage counseling. NeNe talks about a possible therapy session for all the ladies. Kandi is confronted about her falling relationship with Phaedra.
136	17	"Fix It Therapy"	March 15, 2015	717	3.14
Claudia tries to change her career pathway by trying to do stand-up comedy. Phaedra talks to NeNe about her failing relationship with Kandi and tries to work through their relationship. As promised, NeNe brings all the women together for a therapy session with Dr. Jeff and the evening takes an unexpected turn.
137	18	"Housewife Interrupted"	March 22, 2015	718	3.23
Dr. Jeff continues to help the ladies to progress towards better relationship. NeNe is worried about her upcoming role in a Broadway play. Phaedra tries to figure out what her next steps should be regarding her future. Claudia cannot let things go and is still eager to bring all the girls back together and make peace.
138	19	"Drama Detox"	March 29, 2015	719	2.98
The housewives are ready to go on a trip to the Philippines. All the ladies agree to leave excluding NeNe who decides to work on her upcoming role for a Broadway play. The group seems to get along well in the beginning of the trip but things get heated during the dinner time.
139	20	"From Zen to Sin"	April 5, 2015	720	2.59
In the Philippines, the women visit a volcano, go shopping and have a pajama party. In New York, NeNe has a costume fitting for her Broadway show.
140	21	"Chasing Nay-Nay"	April 12, 2015	721	2.63
After the vacation in the Philippines, the ladies are ready to get back to their normal life. Kenya continue to work on her television pilot, Life Twirls On, together with Cynthia who struggles to learn Jamaican accent. Kandi and Todd go to a dinner together. Phaedra throws a charity event. NeNe makes a sudden visit and gets into brawl with Claudia.
141	22	"Atlanta Twirls On"	April 19, 2015	722	2.98
In the season finale, Kenya invites all the ladies to a viewing party of her new pilot Life Twirls On as well as throws a wedding-themed party. NeNe is seconds away from making a Broadway debut in Cinderella. Cynthia and Peter get a phone call from Apollo in prison. Kandi and Todd attend a dinner party at Mama Joyce's new house.
142	23	"Reunion Part 1"	April 26, 2015	723	3.38
Andy Cohen sits down with all the housewives to discuss all the drama of the season. Phaedra opens up about the current situation regarding Apollo in prison. Kandi confronts NeNe's about her behaviour throughout the season. Porsha joins the conversation and responds to all the accusations made about her dating a married African man.
143	24	"Reunion Part 2"	May 3, 2015	724	2.83
In part 2 the women discuss the changes in the circle and how the dynamic have shifted which leads to Kandi and Phaedra addressing the changes in their friendship. Cynthia addresses being more outspoken this season after being accuses of stirring the pot. The men join the women to talk about the past season.
144	25	"Reunion Part 3"	May 10, 2015	725	2.59
NeNe and Cynthia discuss their friendship, or lack of and if there is any hope of hope for a reconciliation. Claudia and NeNe address their tumultuous journey and try to settle their differences. Therapist Dr. Jeff joins the ladies to rehash their group therapy session which leads to NeNe breaking down.
