= The Real Housewives of Atlanta season 12 =

Television season

The Real Housewives of Atlanta
- Season 12
- Cover used by the iTunes Store; Left to right: Williams, Burruss, Moore, Leakes, Marcille and Bailey
- Starring: NeNe Leakes; Kandi Burruss; Cynthia Bailey; Kenya Moore; Porsha Williams; Eva Marcille
- No. of episodes: 26

Release
- Original network: Bravo
- Original release: November 3, 2019 – May 24, 2020

Season chronology
- ← Previous; Season 11 Next → Season 13

The twelfth season of The Real Housewives of Atlanta, an American reality television series, is broadcast on Bravo and it premiered on November 3, 2019, and is primarily filmed in Atlanta, Georgia. Its executive producers are Steven Weinstock, Glenda Hersh, Lauren Eskelin, Lorraine Haughton-Lawson, Luke Neslage, Glenda Cox, Joye Chin, and Andy Cohen.

The Real Housewives of Atlanta focuses on the lives of NeNe Leakes, Kandi Burruss, Cynthia Bailey, Kenya Moore, Porsha Williams and Eva Marcille.

This season marked the final appearance of NeNe Leakes, and the final regular appearance of Eva Marcille.

== Cast ==
For the twelfth season, all the cast from the previous season, with the exception of Shamari DeVoe, returned to the series, with Kenya Moore returning to the show after a one-season absence. Marlo Hampton and Tanya Sam appeared again as friends of the cast. In addition to this, Yovanna Momplasir and Shamea Morton made multiple guest appearances throughout the season

== Production ==
The season's reunion special was scheduled to be filmed on March 19, 2020. However, in the midst of the COVID-19 pandemic, Andy Cohen confirmed the reunion filming was postponed to a later date. The reunion was filmed virtually on April 23, 2020, marking the first time a Bravo show has filmed a reunion show using remote production techniques.

== Episodes ==
The Real Housewives of Atlanta season 12 episodes
No. in series	No. in season	Title	Original release date	U.S. viewers (millions)
236	1	"The Moore the Merrier"	November 3, 2019	1.91
Kenya relishes in her new role as mom to her daughter Brooklyn, while struggling to maintain her long distance marriage to Marc. Porsha’s relationship with Dennis hits a rough patch after he betrays her trust. With a new baby on the way, Eva is feeling the pressure to find the perfect house for her expanding family. An unexpected guest shows up at Kandi’s restaurant to reveal some shocking news regarding Dennis. Meanwhile, Cynthia’s obsession with wanting to get engaged reaches new heights. Kenya throws a coming out party to introduce the ladies to Brooklyn, but the celebration soon takes a left turn when Eva makes an off-handed comment that rubs Kenya the wrong way.
237	2	"Cheatin' Heart"	November 10, 2019	1.85
Cynthia and Kandi try to clean up the mess of the Barbie Bash aftermath. After learning about Eva's distrust, Kenya unleashes her unfiltered thoughts on Cynthia. While struggling to make sense of her relationship, Porsha drops a bomb that no one is expecting.
238	3	"The Float Goes On"	November 17, 2019	1.86
Eva and Cynthia get closer as some of the ladies get ready to head to WorldPride In New York City; Kenya confides that she and Marc are having problems; Kandi and Todd debate parenting styles; NeNe returns with a new outlook on life and great news.
239	4	"Love, Marriage, and Sour Peaches"	November 24, 2019	1.93
On top of the float for WorldPride, Cynthia and NeNe come face to face for the first time since their fallout; Porsha confronts the reality that Dennis was unfaithful; Kenya is forced to acknowledge the growing divide in her long-distance marriage.
240	5	"The Regift That Keeps on Giving"	December 1, 2019	1.97
Kenya shares details about her troubled marriage with Porsha; Kandi drops Riley off in New York City for an internship; NeNe and Marlo have a make-up lunch after their blowup, and NeNe invites a surprise guest who spills some tea about Cynthia.
241	6	"Where There's a Wig, There's a Way"	December 8, 2019	1.80
Kandi and Todd continue to deal with their parenting differences; Kenya puts all her energy into her business; NeNe invites Kandi to lunch and reveals disturbing information about Cynthia; Marlo throws a party to launch her new wig line.
242	7	"What Would Michelle O Do?"	December 15, 2019	1.75
Marlo takes Porsha on a hookah and Hennessy-fueled pedal tour to get her mind off her break up; Kenya visits an estate lawyer; rumors abound that someone in the group secretly recorded Cynthia talking behind NeNe's back.
243	8	"Head Over Hills"	December 22, 2019	1.78
Cynthia's boyfriend, Mike, decides he's ready to take their relationship to the next level; Cynthia tries to get to the bottom of "Snakegate;" with the opening of The Bailey Wine Cellar, NeNe extends an olive branch to Cynthia.
244	9	"A Whine of a Time"	December 29, 2019	1.99
The ladies head to Canada to partake in the Toronto Carnival; before the festivities, Porsha gets a few things off her chest; Cynthia wonders whether Kenya tried to ruin Mike's proposal; Kenya reveals that things with Marc have not improved.
245	10	"Living on the Edge"	January 5, 2020	2.00
NeNe receives an icy welcome in Toronto; NeNe and Eva reopen old wounds; a group trust exercise forces the ladies to live on the edge; Kenya, Porsha and Kandi team up to find the person who recorded Cynthia, then they receive a shocking surprise.
246	11	"Snake Bye"	January 12, 2020	2.01
Porsha is taken by surprise when ex-fiancé, Dennis, pops up with a ring and a question; Kenya, Kandi and Porsha wonder who is responsible for the alleged recording of Cynthia; accusations fly at the final dinner in Toronto.
247	12	"A Hairy Situation"	January 19, 2020	1.75
Eva is determined to get Marley's last name legally changed, but her biological father may present a roadblock; now that Dennis has re-proposed to Porsha, he has to also win her family back; Tanya dishes out a secret she has on Kenya.
248	13	"Hot Tea With a Side of Cookies"	February 9, 2020	1.70
Cynthia brings Tanya and Kenya together to work out their differences, but Kenya arrives with a shady guest in tow. Cynthia visits her fiancé, Mike, in Los Angeles, but becomes concerned when she sees an unexpected side of his life.
249	14	"Lions, and Tigers and Shade"	February 16, 2020	1.66
Cynthia and NeNe finally sit down to try to work through their differences. NeNe invites the ladies to a jungle-themed brunch, but things don't go according to plan when some guests leave early while others show up unannounced.
250	15	"Kenya vs. Ken"	February 23, 2020	1.86
Cynthia's and Mike's relationship is tested. The girls notice a difference in Kenya when Marc is around. Kandi and Kenya co-plan a trip to Athens, Greece. Porsha confronts Kenya. Marc invites NeNe to his charity event.
251	16	"In The Name of Charity"	March 1, 2020	1.94
Cynthia hosts a baby shower for Eva and hopes for an afternoon of love and light despite lingering tensions in the group. When the fun and games are over, Kenya makes a bold request of Tanya. Kandi will do whatever it takes for the role of a lifetime. NeNe calls her friend, Wendy Williams, for advice. Kenya helps Marc plan a charity event, but the distance between them reaches a breaking point.
252	17	"Greece Is the Word"	March 8, 2020	1.78
Kenya and Marc announce their divorce before the ladies’ Greek vacation, so Kandi and Cynthia ask the women to be on their best behavior, but the ask is nearly impossible for NeNe and Marlo. After the bombshell announcement, Kenya shows up to Greece in good spirits, but instead of a sunny trip, the shade comes out.
253	18	"A Greek Tragedy in 6 Acts"	March 15, 2020	1.78
After a misunderstanding with NeNe, Kenya is prepared to put the drama behind her, but finds herself in trouble with Cynthia when she asks inappropriate questions; an intense discussion rehashing old wounds makes Porsha and NeNe cry.
254	19	"Ruined Peaches"	March 22, 2020	1.98
After Porsha and Tanya try to get all the girls to reconcile their issues, NeNe apologizes to Kenya for her past comments; Marlo sends Kenya to her breaking point; on their last day in Greece, Kandi and Cynthia want to reconcile NeNe and Kenya.
255	20	"More Love More Problems"	April 5, 2020	1.74
After a tumultuous trip to Greece, the women are back home in the ATL; Kandi heads to Chicago for a major acting opportunity, but her absence at home reopens old wounds; Eva debuts baby Maverick to the world.
256	21	"Moving Up and Moving On"	April 12, 2020	1.67
Kenya takes her separation from Marc one step further, while Cynthia struggles to decide if she should make the big move to Los Angeles; NeNe and Gregg celebrate their 23rd anniversary in a very unconventional way.
257	22	"A Star Is Born"	April 19, 2020	1.86
On the day of Kandi's baby shower, Mama Joyce and Todd's old feud reignites; NeNe gets the scoop on some bad press circulating about her, meanwhile Porsha has newfound issues with Kenya.
258	23	"Secrets Revealed"	April 26, 2020	1.30
Catch the never-before-seen revealing and hilarious moments you didn't see this season.
259	24	"Reunion Part 1"	May 10, 2020	1.64
After a tumultuous year, Kenya reveals where her relationship with Marc currently stands. Things heat up when NeNe and Eva go head-to-head surrounding the intention behind NeNe’s apology tour. The ladies are joined by Marlo and Tanya who rehash their trip to Toronto, Greece and all the drama in between. Porsha brings the shade and receipts front and center, as she questions where Kenya’s loyalty truly lies.
260	25	"Reunion Part 2"	May 17, 2020	1.71
Kenya and Porsha discuss where their friendship went wrong, which leads to a spicy exchange between Kenya and NeNe. The ladies open up about their past relationship struggles and Eva breaks down while talking about her journey with her daughter. Porsha and Eva have a heated exchange when Porsha calls Eva out for being a shady friend. NeNe goes missing, leaving Andy and the ladies to wonder if she’ll return to defend herself.
261	26	"Reunion Part 3"	May 24, 2020	1.40
The ladies clear the air surrounding the Cookie Lady; Cynthia and Eva each speak their mind on the situation; Cynthia and Kenya examine their friendship, and decide if they can move past the misunderstanding surrounding their relationship.
