= The Real Housewives of Atlanta season 5 =

Season of television series

The Real Housewives of Atlanta
- Season 5
- Cover used by the iTunes Store; Left to right: Burruss, Leakes, Williams, Bailey, Moore and Parks (Not pictured) Zolciak-Biermann
- Starring: NeNe Leakes; Kim Zolciak-Biermann; Kandi Burruss; Cynthia Bailey; Phaedra Parks; Kenya Moore; Porsha Williams
- No. of episodes: 24

Release
- Original network: Bravo
- Original release: November 4, 2012 – April 28, 2013

Season chronology
- ← Previous; Season 4 Next → Season 6

The fifth season of The Real Housewives of Atlanta, an American reality television series, was broadcast on Bravo. It aired from November 4, 2012, until April 28, 2013, and was primarily filmed in Atlanta, Georgia. Its executive producers are Lauren Eskelin, Lorraine Haughton, Glenda Hersh, Carlos King, Steven Weinstock and Andy Cohen.

The Real Housewives of Atlanta focuses on the lives of NeNe Leakes, Kim Zolciak-Biermann, Kandi Burruss, Cynthia Bailey, Phaedra Parks, Kenya Moore and Porsha Williams. It consisted of twenty-four episodes.

This season marked the final regular appearance of Kim Zolciak-Biermann.

== Production and crew ==
Season 5 of The Real Housewives of Atlanta was revealed along with the cast and a trailer in October 2012.

The season premiered with a tell-all titled "Hairstylists Tell All" that centered on the hairstylist to the wives discussing the seasons before an hour long special that aired on October 28, 2012. The season officially began with "Got Sexy Back" on November 4, 2012, while the twentieth "Divas into Icons" served as the season finale and was aired on March 31, 2013. It was followed by a three-part reunion on April 7, April 14 and April 21, 2013 and "Secrets Revealed" that aired on April 28, 2013, which marked the conclusion of the season. Lauren Eskelin, Lorraine Haughton, Glenda Hersh, Carlos King, and Steven Weinstock are recognized as the series' executive producers; it is produced and distributed by True Entertainment, an American subsidiary of the Italian corporation Endemol.

While season 5 was airing, the second spin-off to The Real Housewives of Atlanta, The Kandi Factory premiered on Bravo, starring Kandi Burruss. The series chronicles Kandi Burruss and her team at the Kandi Factory as she assists 16 aspiring artists trying to jumpstart their dreams of success in the music industry. The series is the second spin-off of The Real Housewives of Atlanta, following Don't Be Tardy. On August 30, 2013, Burruss confirmed that the series would not be returning for another season.

== Cast and synopsis ==
Sheree Whitfield exited the series upon the conclusion of the fourth season, due to no longer wanting to be a part of the fighting and drama. Two new wives, Kenya Moore and Porsha Williams, were introduced in the fifth season. As the fifth season introduced former Miss USA Moore and football player Kordell Stewart's wife Williams, Leakes reconciled with Gregg and pondered the possibility of remarrying him. Zolciak was forced to move out of her mansion, which she and Biermann had attempted to purchase less than a year earlier, Leakes began to question Moore's seemingly unfaithful behavior towards her boyfriend Walter during a group trip to Anguilla, which began a feud between Leakes and Williams against Moore. Moore wished to marry Walter although their relationship had begun to deteriorate, while Parks and Moore created competing workout DVDs after plans to make the project a joint venture proved unsuccessful. Toward the end of the season, Williams attempted to revive her failing marriage to Stewart with therapist sessions. Episode 6 saw Kim Zolciak departing from the series, due to no longer wanting to participate in events with the group, and to focus on her own series Don't Be Tardy. The departure of Zolciak made Leakes the only remaining original cast member as of season six.

== Episodes ==
The Real Housewives of Atlanta season 5 episodes
No. overall	No. in season	Title	Original release date	U.S. viewers (millions)
68	0	"Hairstylists Tell All"	October 28, 2012	1.26
Only a few people know more drama than the Housewives themselves...the hairstylists! The Housewives' hairstylists tell all in an hour-long special.
69	1	"Got Sexy Back"	November 4, 2012	3.22
NeNe and Greg come to reconciliation in their relationship. Kandi and Todd take a step in their relationship and move in together. Kim is stressed due to her surprise eviction. Phaedra looks to expand her growing mortuary empire to include pet funerals. The newest housewife, Kenya Moore, is introduced and shows the wives who's boss at Cynthia's Bailey Agency event but Cynthia puts Kenya in check and refuses to bow down. Note: Kenya is added to the opening credits replacing departing cast member Shereè. This episode marks the first appearance of Kenya.
70	2	"Excess Breeds Success"	November 11, 2012	2.55
NeNe continues her newfound success while she promotes her new sitcom, The New Normal, in Los Angeles. Meanwhile, Kim celebrates a birthday with the thought of being homeless on the horizon. Kandi settles into her new life with Todd, as she and Phaedra bond with Kenya. Meanwhile, Kenya struggles with family pressure and a shocking revelation from her boyfriend. Cynthia throws a party, which leads to another faceoff with Kenya.
71	3	"Call Me Miss U.S.A."	November 18, 2012	2.48
Kenya gets invited to a fundraising event for a well-known charity in Atlanta, Hosea Feeds the Homeless, by new Housewife Porsha, who is also the founder's granddaughter and married to former NFL player Kordell Stewart. Kenya and Porsha's relationship starts off rocky after a mishap at the event. NeNe takes a trip to New York for some meetings and spends the day with Cynthia exploring the city. Meanwhile, Phaedra brainstorms her next big business idea: a workout video. On the domestic front, Kandi struggles with seeing her old house for the last time, and Kim considers moving back to her old townhouse. Note: Porsha is added to the opening credits. This episode marks the first appearance of Porsha.
72	4	"Unmoved"	November 25, 2012	2.25
Kandi gets comfortable in her new home. Kim is frantically packing up and moving back to her townhouse. Porsha is angry over a fight she had with Kenya.
73	5	"No Excuse for Excuses"	December 2, 2012	3.01
Cynthia and Peter discuss with NeNe and Gregg a couples trip to Anguilla, and contemplate inviting the rest of the ladies, while Kenya and Phaedra double date with their men at a local amusement park. Porsha gets a fertility scan as she looks forward to the possibility of having twins. The ladies all gather for brunch and things turn ugly in a face-off with the questioning of Kim's commitment in friendship, causing an angry Kim to storm off and cut communication with the group, marking her exit from the show.
74	6	"Hold on to Your Weave"	December 9, 2012	3.20
Cynthia decides to invite Porsha and her husband on the group trip to Anguilla due to Kim's departure. Kenya gets a little too close with Apollo for Phaedra, which causes tension. Note: Kim dramatically leaves the show.
75	7	"I Do...But, I Won't"	December 16, 2012	3.60
NeNe starts to question Kenya's relationship with Walter. Porsha gets into an argument with Kenya.
76	8	"Fools of Engagement"	December 23, 2012	3.16
As the trip in Anguilla comes to an end, Kenya fumes over a clash with Porsha the previous night during a gathering with the rest of the ladies. During a dinner gathering, Kenya who still hopes on getting a marriage proposal from Walter ponders on whether if it will actually happen while bringing questioning of their relationship to the rest of the ladies and their men.
77	9	"Dress Down and Strip Bare"	December 30, 2012	3.50
The ladies return from the trip to Anguilla, Kenya still continues to question her relationship with Walter. Porsha gathers with Cynthia and Kandi at her home bringing talks over having children and marriage proposals. NeNe lands a cover photoshoot. While shopping at a food store, Cynthia confronts Peter over their relationship after both see a divorce rumor on a blog site regarding Phaedra and Apollo; both couples decide to go to an exotic club as Phaedra and Apollo open up over issues in their relationship. Kenya confronts Walter over their relationship status.
78	10	"Off the Hook"	January 6, 2013	3.67
NeNe faces challenges before she heads off to Los Angeles to shoot her role in The New Normal including bonding with her new granddaughter and planning to move to a new home in the Hollywood Hills, Los Angeles; the rest of the ladies throw a going away party for her. Kandi settles into her new life and wonders about marriage. Kenya lands a boxing-themed photoshoot for a magazine then ends her relationship with Walter during a date while fishing.
79	11	"This Donkey Kicks"	January 13, 2013	3.40
Phaedra with Apollo start focusing on their fitness workout video, leading to clashing with Kenya over a potential business deal who then decides to start her own fitness workout video. Meanwhile, NeNe tries to settle into her new life in Los Angeles including moving there. Kandi throws a birthday party for Todd, as Kenya attempts to conduct business causing brief tension.
80	12	"Battle of the Booty"	January 20, 2013	3.25
Due to Kenya and Phaedra's business agreement being terminated, Kenya reveals the news about her own fitness video. Phaedra learns about Kenya's mischievous antics and starts exposing information about her. NeNe flies back to Atlanta to spend time with her grandchild. Cynthia casts for her upcoming charity runway event.
81	13	"Make an Ass Out of a Donkey"	January 27, 2013	4.09
Phaedra and Kenya continue on advancing their own fitness workout video projects. Cynthia ventures on a business deal over having a pageant division in her agency including hosting her first one. Porsha meets Kenya at a restaurant but things turn rocky when Kenya questions her friendship with Phaedra. NeNe settles more into her new life in Los Angeles and meets her acting coach. During a charity event, Kenya shows up imitating Phaedra in a similar revealing outfit she wore on the trip in Anguilla causing shock to the rest of the ladies; Kenya confronts Phaedra over the fallout of their fitness workout video business deal and disparaging comments.
82	14	"Prayed Up"	February 10, 2013	2.70
Porsha works endlessly for Kordell's Harlem Renaissance-themed party for his 40th birthday. Meanwhile, Cynthia is annoyed by Porsha's nonexistent help that she agreed to for Cynthia's charity pageant. Kenya is distraught when she discovers two suspicious lumps in her breasts during a doctors visit. Don Juan, Kandi's manager, tells her to focus more on her career.
83	15	"Praise the Pageant"	February 17, 2013	2.60
Cynthia lets Kenya be a judge at her Miss Renaissance pageant. Kandi records her first gospel single with Marvin Sapp, and her father stops by the studio to thank her for acknowledging her holy roots. Phaedra invites Kandi and Todd over for dinner.
84	16	"Peaches Don't Grow in Hollywood"	March 3, 2013	3.06
The housewives fly to Hollywood, by invitation of NeNe, to visit the set of The New Normal and the studios. NeNe is furious when the ladies show up over two hours late to her dinner party and aren't allowed in.
85	17	"Strip is a Trip"	March 10, 2013	2.71
The ladies take a trip to Las Vegas. Porsha becomes uncomfortable and upset when informed that the ladies planned a trip to a strip club. NeNe and Porsha start an argument over NeNe's view on Porsha's relationship with Kordell in the limo, which leads Porsha to leave the trip early. Phaedra and Kenya try to mend their relationship. Nene, Cynthia, and Kenya visit a drag queen for a charity event, while Kandi and Phaedra miss the limo ride.
86	18	"He's Stalking, I'm Walking"	March 17, 2013	2.74
NeNe is in New York City for a press tour in order to promote her sitcom. Porsha waits to take a pregnancy test until she arrives home in Atlanta with Kordell. Kandi hits her breaking point after the renovations of both her business and her home end up over the top. Walter keeps popping up and Kenya has had enough.
87	19	"Donktabulous!"	March 24, 2013	2.80
Kenya brings the drama to Kandi's housewarming party after she learns that Walter is there. Cynthia breaks up the tension due to Kenya taking things too far. Porsha asks her therapist for some guidance regarding her relationship with Kordell. Later, Kandi hosts her first Bedroom Kandi sales gathering where the ladies truly see how huge her empire is becoming. Phaedra and Kenya battle it out by each starting production of their fitness videos.
88	20	"Divas into Icons"	March 31, 2013	3.02
Kenya hosts her Hollywood Icons gala and assigns costumes to all the ladies and even the rest of the guests. Kandi and Phaedra attend a self-defense class while Porsha along with Kordell continues to see her therapist. Later on, the ladies are dressed extravagantly at the party and ready to enjoy a night of fun until Porsha arrives with a different costume to which Kenya takes offense and kicks out her and Kordell out of the event until the rest of the ladies decide to leave; NeNe who then arrives intervenes and has a talk with Kenya who then apologizes to the rest of the ladies.
89	21	"Reunion: Part One"	April 7, 2013	3.63
NeNe, Kandi, Phaedra, Cynthia, Kenya, and Porsha dish out the good and bad of Season 5 with host Andy Cohen. Kenya and Phaedra argue, after Kenya states that Phaedra is too overweight to do a fitness video. NeNe and Kandi dish out their up and down relationship.
90	22	"Reunion: Part Two"	April 14, 2013	3.52
Kim Zolciak makes a surprise return to defend her name and explain what she's been up to since her departure from the series. Phaedra has the spotlight on her after NeNe calls her out over behind-the-scenes drama that wasn't shown on the series. This episode marks the final appearance of Kim until the season 9 finale.
91	23	"Reunion: Part Three"	April 21, 2013	3.75
In the last part of the reunion, the husbands and significant others give their opinions about the season. Kandi discusses her recent engagement with Todd and their new life together. The men talk about the drama between Kenya and Walter's breakup. The housewife who is accused of allegedly "sexting" one of the husbands is also revealed.
92	24	"Secrets Revealed"	April 28, 2013	2.43
The Secrets Revealed special contains extra footage of the return of Kim Zolciak, the ladies reaction to the reunion, Phaedra's pet funerals along with never-before-seen footage.
