= The Real Housewives of Atlanta season 17 =

Season of American reality television series

The Real Housewives of Atlanta
- Season 17
- Promotional poster
- Starring: Phaedra Parks; Porsha Williams; Drew Sidora; Shamea Morton Mwangi; Angela Oakley; Kelli Potter; Pinky Cole; K. Michelle
- No. of episodes: 20

Release
- Original network: Bravo
- Original release: April 5 – August 23, 2026

Season chronology
- ← Previous; Season 16

The seventeenth season of The Real Housewives of Atlanta, an American reality television series, was broadcast on Bravo. It premiered on April 5, 2026, and concluded on August 23, 2026. It was primarily filmed in Atlanta, Georgia.

The season focuses on the personal and professional lives of Phaedra Parks, Porsha Williams, Drew Sidora, Shamea Morton Mwangi, Angela Oakley, Kelli Potter, Pinky Cole and K. Michelle, with Cynthia Bailey appearing as a friend of the housewives.

== Cast ==
In July 2025, Brit Eady announced her departure from the franchise following her decision to not participate in the reunion for the sixteenth season. In February of the following year, it was announced that the seventeenth season would premiere on April 5, 2026. Phaedra Parks, Porsha Williams, Drew Sidora, Shamea Morton Mwangi, Angela Oakley and Kelli Potter were all named as returning housewives. Pinky Cole and K. Michelle were announced as new cast additions, while Cynthia Bailey's return to the franchise was announced as a "friend of the housewives".

== Production ==
The season's executive producers are Steven Weinstock, Glenda Hersh, Lauren Eskelin, Lorraine Lawson, Glenda Cox, Leola Westbrook-Lawrence, and Andy Cohen. The reunion was taped on June 25, 2026.

== Episodes ==
The Real Housewives of Atlanta season 17 episodes
No. overall	No. in season	Title	Rating (18–49)	Original release date	US viewers (millions)
341	1	"A Warm Welcome"	0.12	April 5, 2026	0.62
342	2	"Rumors and Raised Eyebrows"	0.15	April 12, 2026	0.71
343	3	"Rum, Ruptures & Redemption"	0.14	April 19, 2026	0.69
344	4	"Where's the Beef... and the Budget?"	0.12	April 26, 2026	0.69
345	5	"Dynasty Divas in Atlanta"	0.17	May 3, 2026	0.69
346	6	"Saddle Up and Settle Scores"	0.13	May 10, 2026	0.57
347	7	"Dynasty, Diamonds and Drama"	0.13	May 17, 2026	0.61
348	8	"A Sound Bath Breakdown"	0.10	May 24, 2026	0.56
349	9	"Picking Up the Peaches"	0.15	May 31, 2026	0.65
350	10	"Star Spangled Mess"	0.12	June 7, 2026	0.59
351	11	"Shady Text and Bigger Regrets"	0.10	June 14, 2026	0.52
352	12	"The Glow Up Cost"	0.10	June 21, 2026	0.55
353	13	"Kilts, Chaos & Reads"	0.10	June 28, 2026	0.47
354	14	"Highland Games and Explosive Claims"	0.09	July 12, 2026	0.57
355	15	"Waking the Dead"	0.10	July 19, 2026	0.50
356	16	"Halloween Hot Pocket"	0.12	July 26, 2026	0.55
357	17	"Rebels & Outlaws"	0.11	August 2, 2026	0.58
358	18	"Reunion Part 1"	0.11	August 9, 2026	0.56
359	19	"Reunion Part 2"	0.13	August 16, 2026	0.62
360	20	"Reunion Part 3"	0.11	August 23, 2026	0.61
