= The Real Housewives of Atlanta season 11 =

Season of television series

The Real Housewives of Atlanta
- Season 11
- Cover used by the iTunes Store; Left to right: Burruss, Williams, Bailey, Leakes, Marcille and DeVoe
- Starring: NeNe Leakes; Kandi Burruss; Cynthia Bailey; Porsha Williams; Shamari DeVoe; Eva Marcille
- No. of episodes: 23

Release
- Original network: Bravo
- Original release: November 4, 2018 – April 21, 2019

Season chronology
- ← Previous; Season 10 Next → Season 12

The eleventh season of The Real Housewives of Atlanta, an American reality television series, is broadcast on Bravo. It aired on November 4, 2018, until April 21, 2019, and is primarily filmed in Atlanta, Georgia. Its executive producers are Steven Weinstock, Glenda Hersh, Lauren Eskelin, Lorraine Haughton-Lawson, Ken Martinez, Glenda Cox, Anne Swan, Anthony Sylvester, and Andy Cohen.

The Real Housewives of Atlanta focuses on the lives of Nene Leakes, Kandi Burruss, Cynthia Bailey, Porsha Williams, Eva Marcille and Shamari DeVoe.

This season marked the only appearance of Shamari DeVoe.

== Cast ==
Following the conclusion of the tenth season, Shereé Whitfield, Kenya Moore, and Kim Zolciak-Biermann left the show. For the eleventh season, NeNe Leakes, Kandi Burruss, Cynthia Bailey and Porsha Williams all returned to the series, with Eva Marcille being promoted to the main cast and singer of R&B girl group, Blaque, Shamari DeVoe joining the cast as a Housewife.

Elsewhere, Marlo Hampton once again returned in a recurring capacity, while Tanya Sam was introduced as a "friend of the housewives" through her connection with Leakes and later Marcille. In addition to this, Yovanna Momplaisir is introduced as a guest this season through her connection with Leakes, with Shamea Morton also making guest appearances.

== Episodes ==
The Real Housewives of Atlanta season 11 episodes
No. in series	No. in season	Title	Original release date	U.S. viewers (millions)
213	1	"To Love and to Cherish"	November 4, 2018	1.93
Cynthia and Porsha have fallen hard for their new men; Eva has a new ring and a new baby; NeNe prepares to fight alongside Gregg as he begins his battle with cancer; Porsha rallies all the ladies for a trip to Miami to show the Leakeses their support.
214	2	"South Peach"	November 11, 2018	1.84
Porsha enjoys her birthday weekend with Dennis, but the romance comes to a halt after a brush with danger; Kandi, Cynthia, Eva, and Marlo touch down in Miami to surprise NeNe as she hits the comedy stage for the first time since Gregg's diagnosis.
215	3	"A New Addition"	November 18, 2018	1.86
Eva and Porsha hit the gym; Kandi reconnects with friend Shamari DeVoe who is the lead singer from the group Blaque; the ladies attend ATL Live to check out Shamari's performance; Kandi finds out potentially damaging information about Porsha's man.
216	4	"Pass the Peach, Throw the Shade"	November 25, 2018	1.86
Porsha faces Dennis' mother; Kandi and Todd meet with Dr. Jackie; Shamari drops a bomb on her mother-in-law; Cynthia hosts a Bailey-Cue; NeNe hears a surprising rumor; the ladies find themselves in the hot seat during Cynthia's Pass the Peach game.
217	5	"Tatted Tales"	December 2, 2018	1.94
Kandi gets advice from the women about sharing details from Porsha's boyfriend's past; Eva's mother pushes her daughter's buttons regarding the wedding's budget; Shamari reveals more details about her open relationship with her husband.
218	6	"Whining and Dining"	December 9, 2018	2.04
Shamari and Ronnie open up to Kandi and Todd about their relationship; Kandi and Porsha have a one-on-one meeting for the first time in years; Nene decides to throw a couples' event; Porsha gives Dennis the surprise of a lifetime for his birthday.
219	7	"Sisterhood of Traveling Peaches"	December 16, 2018	1.82
A newly pregnant Porsha works at Dennis' restaurant to win over his mother's approval; the men bail on Nene and Gregg's couples trip; the women board a bus to Destin, Fla., and play a game of truth or dare during which Kandi spills more Dennis tea.
220	8	"Final Destin-ation"	December 23, 2018	1.65
In Destin, Fla., Shamari accepts fashion tips from Marlo; during rainy weather, the ladies put their talents on display in their quest for a crown; the group begins to suspect there is more to Porsha's alcohol cleanse than she's letting on.
221	9	"A Mother's Love"	December 30, 2018	1.77
Cynthia plans a send-off for Noelle that ends in a meltdown; Porsha and Dennis are ecstatic about their first sonogram; Shamari and her mother forge a new bond; NeNe and Gregg hold a family meeting to educate their sons on Gregg's cancer.
222	10	"The Wrong Road"	January 6, 2019	2.12
Porsha gets the boot after an altercation at Todd's birthday party; Mike Hill comes to town; Eva and Tanya host a hibachi night followed by a bachelorette trip invite; the evening goes awry when Porsha and Kandi engage in a battle of words.
223	11	"Texts, Lies & Therapy"	January 13, 2019	2.23
Eva and Tanya's hibachi night continues to go up in flames when Eva is confronted by Porsha; NeNe adjusts to the mounting pressure of being Gregg's caretaker; Kandi invites Shamari to be a part of her latest money making venture.
224	12	"The Peaches of Tokyo"	January 20, 2019	1.81
While in Tokyo to celebrate her bachelorette party, Eva receives devastating news that threatens to derail the trip; Porsha shares a secret with the rest of the ladies; NeNe and Tanya get into a heated confrontation that leaves everyone confused.
225	13	"Tempers in Tokyo"	January 27, 2019	2.15
After NeNe is confronted about a shady comment, tempers spiral out of control; Eva tries to stay in good spirits, but an interaction with Marlo drives her over the edge; the ladies go out for a sexy night in the Red Light District.
226	14	"Lost in Translation"	February 10, 2019	1.63
Eva and the ladies continue their celebration with a bachelorette party; epic battles go down during a traditional samurai lesson; NeNe's troubles with Gregg come to a head and leave her questioning their relationship.
227	15	"Let's Make It Official"	February 17, 2019	1.95
As Porsha and Dennis prepare for their baby's arrival, the ladies speculate about when they will take their relationship to the next level; Eva deals with the stresses of wedding planning; Kandi and Todd struggle with the decision to use a surrogate.
228	16	"Bye Wig, Hello Drama"	March 3, 2019	1.96
Kandi gets a surprise at her "Welcome to the Dungeon" auditions. Eva deals with increasing wedding costs and NeNe hosts a Bye Wig party during which the women rock their natural hair. A misunderstanding leaves everyone both wigless and speechless.
229	17	"Welcome to the Dungeon"	March 10, 2019	2.08
In the aftermath of NeNe's Bye Wig party, the ladies try to make sense of what happened. Shamari tells Ronnie about her drunken antics and Eva searches for a wedding dress. Kandi preps for the launch of her "Welcome to the Dungeon" burlesque show.
230	18	"The Model Bride"	March 17, 2019	2.08
The ladies all come together to celebrate Eva and Michael's big day. The ladies are concerned with Shamari's behaviour. NeNe drops a bomb about her marriage and Kandi and Porsha confront Marlo about a miscommunication that occurred after the party.
231	19	"No Money, Mo' Problems"	March 24, 2019	2.05
Eva's post honeymoon bliss crashes down around her as Marlo serves up a pot of tea regarding her living situation; since her meltdown, NeNe struggles over what's next for her marriage; Kandi and Todd celebrate the opening of their restaurant.
232	20	"Caught in the Middle"	March 31, 2019	2.14
Porsha gets ready for her gender reveal, only to have her hopes dashed; Eva pushes past the rumors about her finances; when Cynthia's old friend makes an appearance at her wine cooler event, it threatens to blow a hole in her relationship with NeNe.
233	21	"Reunion Part 1"	April 7, 2019	2.35
A pregnant Porsha relives the highlights of her relationship with Dennis; Eva lands in the hot seat; Kandi provides an update on her surrogacy journey; Cynthia confronts NeNe; Porsha and Kandi address their relationship when it comes to social media.
234	22	"Reunion Part 2"	April 14, 2019	2.09
Kandi clues Porsha in about reports regarding her and Dennis' relationship timeline. Elsewhere, NeNe and Gregg talk about his cancer diagnosis and their marriage, plus, tempers flare as the women discuss the Bye Wig party.
235	23	"Reunion Part 3"	April 21, 2019	1.67
The Bye Wig party saga continues, and Marlo is accused of adding fuel to the fire. Meanwhile, Cynthia glows as she talks about her whirlwind relationship with Mike Hill, the ladies discuss Eva's wedding party, and NeNe and Cynthia go head to head.
