= Mike Hill (sportscaster) =

American television sportscaster and sports journalist

- Born: James Michael Hill; August 19, 1970 (age 55); New York City, U.S.
- Education: Jess Lanier High School
- Occupations: Television personality, talk show host, actor
- Spouse: Cynthia Bailey (m. 2020; div. 2022)
- Children: 2

James Michael Hill (born August 19, 1970) is an American television personality and talk show host currently with FOX Sports.

== Career ==
Hill, who spent his childhood in both the Bronx and Bessemer, Alabama, enlisted as a reservist in the U.S. Air Force after graduation from high school. He began his career as a sports director at WHAG-TV in Hagerstown, Maryland, in early 1995. He got his first anchoring job later that year with KSEE-TV in Fresno, California. From 1997 to 2000, Hill spent time with WKRN-TV in Nashville, Tennessee, covering high school football and earning two Emmy Awards. From 2000 to 2002, he spent time as a host at Fox Sports Net in New York City. From 2002 to 2004, in his final job before joining ESPN, he served as a sports anchor at KXAS-TV in Dallas, Texas.

Hill was with ESPN from 2004 to 2013. He hosted Hill and Schlereth with Mark Schlereth on ESPN Radio and also hosted a variety of the network's shows including SportsCenter, ESPN First Take, NFL Live, Baseball Tonight, Highlight Express, and various remote projects including Cam Newton's 2011 Pro Day at Auburn.

In August 2013, he joined Fox Sports 1 (FS1) where he has guest hosted Fox Sports Live and Fox Football Daily. He also contributes to the networks coverage of college basketball. On April 7, 2014, Hill began hosting America's Pregame. He hosted the show until its cancellation in September 2015. On June 22, 2018, Hill began hosting BIG3 games on FS1 for their second season; the BIG3 contract would be handed over to CBS Sports following that season. In October 2019, he began hosting The Mike and Donny Show on Fox Soul. From March 1, 2021, until the network's closure in March 2022, he co-hosted a morning show Start Your Day With Sharon and Mike with Sharon Reed on the Black News Channel.

== Personal life ==
He was engaged to former model and Bravo's reality television show Real Housewives of Atlanta star Cynthia Bailey, in July 2019, and married on October 10, 2020. Hill frequently appeared on the show. Bailey announced in October 2022 that she filed for divorce from Hill. The divorce was finalized the same year.
