= Chuck Smith (defensive end) =

American football player and coach (born 1969)

Profile
- Title: Outside linebacker coach

Personal information
- Born: December 21, 1969 (age 56); Athens, Georgia, U.S.
- Listed height: 6 ft 2 in (1.88 m)
- Listed weight: 262 lb (119 kg)

Career information
- Position: Defensive end (No. 90, 91)
- High school: Clarke Central (Athens)
- College: Tennessee
- NFL draft: 1992: 2nd round, 51st overall pick

Career history

Playing
- Atlanta Falcons (1992–1999); Carolina Panthers (2000)

Coaching
- Tennessee (2010) Defensive line coach; Baltimore Ravens (2023–2025) Outside linebacker coach

Awards and highlights
- Second-team All-Pro (1997); First-team All-SEC (1991)

Career NFL statistics
- Sacks: 58.5
- Forced fumbles: 20
- Fumble recoveries: 12
- Interceptions: 3
- Defensive touchdowns: 2
- Stats at Pro Football Reference

Charles Henry Smith, III (born December 21, 1969) is an American professional football coach and former player who was the outside linebacker coach for the Baltimore Ravens of the National Football League (NFL). He played in the NFL as a defensive end.

Smith played college football for the Tennessee Volunteers and was selected in the second round of the 1992 NFL draft. He played in the NFL with the Atlanta Falcons from 1992 to 1999 and the Carolina Panthers in 2000. Smith spent the 2010 season as an assistant coach as his alma mater, Tennessee. He also has worked as a radio host in Atlanta.

== High school and college years ==
Smith attended Clarke Central High School in Athens, Georgia, While playing two years in the NJCAA at Northeastern Oklahoma A&M, scouts took notice of Smith's natural athletic ability, which earned him a full scholarship to the University of Tennessee. While at Tennessee, Smith played in both the Sugar and the Fiesta Bowl and earned Most Valuable Player honors at the Senior Bowl.

== Professional playing career ==
Pre-draft measurables
Height	Weight	Arm length	Hand span	40-yard dash	10-yard split	20-yard split	Vertical jump	Broad jump	Bench press
6 ft 2 1/8 in (1.88 m)	242 lb (110 kg)	32 1/4 in (0.82 m)	8 in (0.20 m)	4.85 s	1.73 s	2.78 s	30.0 in (0.76 m)	9 ft 2 in (2.79 m)	15 reps
All values from NFL Combine

Smith was selected in the second round of the 1992 NFL draft by the Atlanta Falcons. For eight seasons in Atlanta, from 1992 to 1999, Smith established himself as an All-Pro defensive end and helped get the Falcons to Super Bowl XXXIII. In 2000, Smith left Atlanta to join the Carolina Panthers. He ended his career there after one season following multiple surgeries on his right knee.

== NFL career statistics ==
Year	Team	Games		Tackles				Interceptions					Fumbles			
Year	Team	G	GS	Comb	Solo	Ast	Sack	Int	Yds	Lng	TD	PD	FF	FR	Yds	TD
1992	ATL	16	0	30	—	—	2.0	—	—	—	0	—	—	0	0	0
1993	ATL	15	1	30	—	—	3.5	—	—	—	0	—	4	2	0	0
1994	ATL	15	10	31	26	5	11.0	1	36	36	1	—	1	2	0	0
1995	ATL	14	14	40	34	6	5.5	—	—	—	0	—	4	2	0	0
1996	ATL	15	15	40	33	7	6.0	1	21	21	0	—	0	1	0	0
1997	ATL	16	15	54	42	12	12.0	1	4	4	0	—	4	0	0	0
1998	ATL	16	16	47	36	11	8.5	—	—	—	0	—	3	4	71	1
1999	ATL	16	16	50	38	12	10.0	0	0	0	0	2	4	1	18	0
2000	CAR	2	2	1	1	0	0.0	—	—	—	0	—	0	—	—	—
Career		125	89	323	210	53	58.5	3	61	36	1	2	20	12	89	1

== Life after playing career ==
Immediately after retiring from the NFL he joined 790 The Zone as part of the Monsters of the Midday with Matt Chernoff and Chuck Oliver.

Smith worked as a radio host with WVEE (V-103) in Atlanta. Smith also works as a personal trainer for other football players. He has two sons, Chuck the 4th, and Maddox. Also one daughter, Giovani. He weighs 50 pounds (23 kg) less than he did during his football career and has spoken out about the health risks associated with the increasing size of football players.

On February 5, 2010, Smith accepted a position as defensive line coach at his alma mater, the University of Tennessee. Smith left the Tennessee Volunteers coaching staff after a mutual decision with head coach Derek Dooley on February 6, 2011. In 2013 and 2014, Smith and his wife Mynique appeared on season 6 of The Real Housewives of Atlanta.

He resumed his coaching career when he joined the Baltimore Ravens as an outside linebacker coach for the 2023 NFL season.
