= America's Pregame =

America's Pregame is an early evening program on Fox Sports 1 hosted by Mike Hill and Molly McGrath. America's Pregame previewed upcoming games along with news and analysis. It aired at 5 p.m. Eastern. The show made its debut on April 7, 2014, replacing Fox Football Daily. America's Pregame was canceled in September 2015.
