= Shereé Whitfield =

American TV personality (born 1970)

- Born: Shereé Monique Fuller; January 2, 1970 (age 56); Shaker Heights, Ohio, U.S.
- Occupations: TV personality; entrepreneur
- Years active: 2008–present
- Spouse: Bob Whitfield (m. 2000; div. 2007)
- Children: 3

Shereé Monique Whitfield (née Fuller; born January 2, 1970) is an American TV personality and entrepreneur. She is best known as an original cast member of the Bravo reality television series The Real Housewives of Atlanta.

== Early life ==
Whitfield was born and raised in Shaker Heights, Ohio. She went to Lomond Elementary School and Byron Junior High School.

== Career ==
Whitfield was cast in the inaugural season of The Real Housewives of Atlanta. She appeared in the main cast for the first four seasons. Whitfield returned to RHOA in 2015 in a "friend of" capacity for the show's eighth season.

In 2015, Whitfield re-joined the cast of RHOA as a full time main cast member for season 9. Whitfield left the show following the show's tenth season and returned as a main cast member for the show's fourteenth and fifteenth season. Whitfield also made a guest appearance in the show's thirteenth season.

== Personal life ==
Whitfield married Bob Whitfield, a former NFL offensive tackle, in 2000. The couple had two children. The couple divorced in 2007.

She also has a daughter from a previous relationship.
