= Cynthia Bailey =

American model, reality television star, and actress

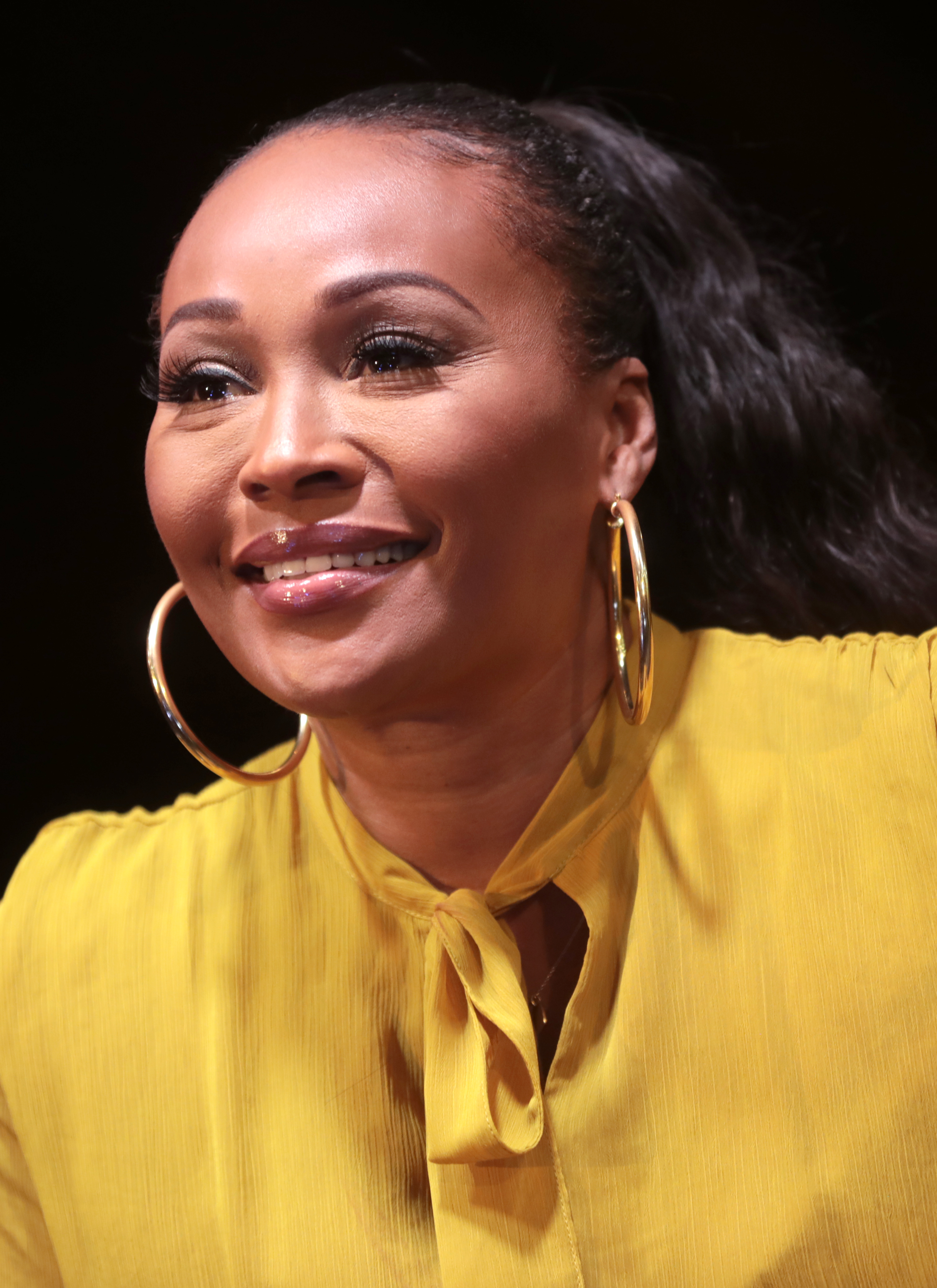
- Bailey in 2019
- Born: Cynthia Denise Bailey; February 19, 1967 (age 59); Decatur, Alabama, U.S.
- Occupations: Model; television personality; actress
- Years active: 1985–present
- Known for: The Real Housewives of Atlanta (2010–present); The Real Housewives Ultimate Girls Trip (2021)
- Height: 1.78 m (5 ft 10 in)
- Spouses: Peter Thomas (m. 2010; div. 2017) Mike Hill (m. 2020; div. 2022)
- Partner: Leon Robinson (1999–2003)
- Children: 1

Cynthia Denise Bailey (born February 19, 1967) is an American model, reality television personality, podcaster and actress. Born and raised in Alabama, she moved to New York City at the age of 18 to pursue a modeling career. There, she signed a five-year contract with Wilhelmina Models, and subsequently appeared as a model in various magazines and advertising campaigns. She worked as a runway model in Paris and Milan.

Bailey has acted in films, including Without You I'm Nothing (1990) and For Love or Money (1993), and on television programs, such as The Cosby Show. She joined the Bravo reality television show The Real Housewives of Atlanta in 2010. She married Peter Thomas in 2010, and their divorce was finalized in 2017. Her relationship with sportscaster Mike Hill was showcased on The Real Housewives of Atlanta from 2018 until she left the series in 2021.

== Early life ==
Cynthia Denise Bailey was born on February 19, 1967, in Decatur, Alabama, and raised in Tuscumbia. Her father, Elijah, worked at an auto factory and her mother, Barbara, worked at a sewing factory. Barbara was 18 when she was pregnant with Cynthia, and had another daughter, Malorie, roughly a year later. While growing up, Cynthia was inspired by her grandmother, Mae Frankie Ford, who worked in a sewing factory, sold hotdogs and hamburgers, cleaned houses, and volunteered to care for an elderly woman. She described Ford as "the first female black entrepreneur in [her] life".

Bailey enrolled in freshman-level courses at the University of Alabama in Huntsville, and competed in local beauty pageants. She was the first African American homecoming queen at Deshler High School. After winning the event, she participated in a homecoming queen pageant. Even though she did not win, she was contacted by a Wilhelmina Models talent scout. At age 18, she moved to New York City and signed a five-year contract with the modeling agency. She raised the money for the move through part-time work at a mall.

== Career ==
=== 1985–2009: Early modeling career ===
Bailey appeared in the 1989 music video for New Order's "Round & Round". In 1990, she played Roxanne in the film Without You I'm Nothing, and remained friends with its star Sandra Bernhard. Naomi Campbell was considered for the role. Bailey appeared in a 1990 episode of the sitcom The Cosby Show. Her audition for a role in the 1991 film The Five Heartbeats was featured in the 2018 documentary The Making of the Five Heartbeats. In 1993, she played a model in the film For Love or Money, and the following year, she appeared in the music video for Heavy D's single "Nuttin But Love" from the album of the same name. She played a masseuse in a 1995 episode of New York Undercover.

After working as a runway model in Paris and Milan for a year, Bailey returned to New York City and modeled for Maybelline, Oil of Olay, and Target and in magazines including Vogue, Glamour, Elle, and Vanity Fair. She appeared on two Essence magazine covers in June 1995 – her first job as a model – and 1997. The magazine's then editor-in-chief Susan L. Taylor described Bailey as one of her favorite models. Bailey's favorite modeling job was a Vanity Cover shot by Annie Leibovitz and featuring Iman, Beverly Johnson, Naomi Campbell, and Tyra Banks; Iman had invited Bailey to participate in the shoot.

=== 2010–2016: The Real Housewives of Atlanta and other work ===
In 2010, Bailey joined the Bravo reality television show The Real Housewives of Atlanta, which featured her relationship with club owner Peter Thomas and her friendship with NeNe Leakes. She was introduced in the show's third season along with Phaedra Parks. Bailey was initially uncertain about joining the show, describing it as "too dramatic", but changed her mind after viewing it as a business opportunity. She was contacted by Bravo shortly after moving to Atlanta with Thomas; the network said that they "wanted to bring more class to the cast, and feature more women that already had successful careers before the show".

In 2011, Bailey opened her modeling school, Bailey Agency School of Fashion in Atlanta; the following year, she held a model search in several cites in the Southern United States as part of a contest to win representation by a New York modeling agency. Bailey appeared in a trilogy of music videos ("Age Ain't a Factor", "Baby x3", and "Chase Forever") for Jaheim's 2013 album Appreciation Day. In the "Age Ain't a Factor" video, she was shown in a fictional Essence article on "Ageless Beauty", alongside LisaRaye McCoy and Vivica A. Fox. The "Baby x3" video focuses on infidelity with Bailey and Thomas portraying "secret lovers".

Bailey appeared in the 2015 documentary series Black Friday, which is about how little consumer spending is retained within black communities. The same year, she acted in Kenya Moore's television pilot, Life Twirls On. For the character, she used a Jamaican accent. In 2016, she had a minor role in the film Sharknado: The 4th Awakens, and guest starred on The Next :15 alongside former The Real Housewives of Atlanta costar Claudia Jordan. She was featured on a celebrity edition of Cupcake Wars with Nene Leakes.

=== 2017–present: Professional expansion ===
Bailey was a guest judge for the preliminary and finals competition of the 65th Miss Universe competition. In 2018, Bailey signed a contract with the New York-based agency Major Models; her daughter is also signed with the company. In April 2018, Bailey underwent surgery to remove a lipoma tumor from her left shoulder blade. The procedure was successful without any reported complications. In 2019, Bailey guest starred in an episode of Last Call, and acted in How High 2, the sequel to the 2001 film How High. She started a line of bags, named CB VIOR, as well as a line of candles, leather goods, and eyewear.

Bailey opened a wine bar, The Bailey Wine Cellar, and an event space, The Bailey Room, in Grant Park, Atlanta in July 2019. The same year, she had a partnership with Seagram, creating a signature drink, a Bellini cocktail. It was sold in April 2019. The launch party was shown on an eleventh season episode of The Real Housewives of Atlanta. In it, Leakes is angry that Bailey had invited Kenya Moore to the event without her knowledge. The incident was discussed during the season's reunion episodes, and Leakes and Bailey publicly ended their friendship. Bailey is a brand ambassador for Seagram since 2018. In 2019, she guest-starred on Star and Tales.

Bailey chose to leave The Real Housewives of Atlanta in 2021, after being a part of the series for eleven seasons. She starred in the first season of The Real Housewives Ultimate Girls Trip, a spin-off featuring various women from The Real Housewives franchise, which premiered on Peacock in 2021. In an Essence interview conducted in the same year, she said she was shifting her focus from reality television to acting. Bailey had a recurring role in the second season of Games People Play as documentarian Ndasia.

In 2022, Bailey competed as a HouseGuest the third season of Celebrity Big Brother, placing third in the competition. The same year, she appeared in the 2022 Lifetime movie Cruel Instruction. The following year, Bailey returned to The Real Housewives of Atlanta as a guest for its fifteenth season.

In 2024, it was announced that Bailey would be returning to The Real Housewives of Atlanta in a "friend of" capacity for its sixteenth season. Since October 2024, Bailey co-hosts the Humble Brag with Crystal and Cynthia podcast alongside Crystal Kung Minkoff, focusing on topics related to pop culture, reality television, and celebrities.

== Personal life ==
Bailey dated Jayson Williams in 1996, and he proposed to her during a New Jersey Nets halftime show. She rejected the proposal and returned the engagement ring to him. She also turned down a marriage proposal from Russell Simmons. Bailey had a romantic relationship with Leon Robinson, and on November 9, 1999, she gave birth to their daughter, Noelle. During her pregnancy, Bailey learned she had a uterine fibroid, which she described as "the size of a grape"; she chose to treat this with uterine fibroid embolization rather than a hysterectomy since she wanted the option of having more children in the future. She partnered with USA Fibroids Centers to raise awareness about fibroids and treatment options.

Bailey married Peter Thomas on July 24, 2010, at the Fernbank Museum of Natural History; the wedding was shown on a season three episode of The Real Housewives of Atlanta. In 2013, Bailey and Thomas published a book about their relationship entitled Carry-On Baggage: Our Nonstop Flight. They publicly announced their separation in 2016, and their divorce was finalized in March 2017. Bailey moved with her daughter to a house that she calls "Lake Bailey". She initially wanted an apartment, saying that she wanted "the New York City sort of lifestyle", but producers from The Real Housewives of Atlanta convinced her to purchase a house instead.

Bailey publicly announced her relationship with Fox Sports correspondent Mike Hill in August 2018. Hill and Bailey became engaged in July 2019, and were married on October 10, 2020. Bailey said that due to the COVID-19 pandemic, strict rules were implemented for the wedding to protect the 250 guests and a deep cleaning of the Acworth, Georgia venue. However, Bailey received criticism on social media following the release of pictures and videos that showed guests not wearing masks. She announced in October 2022 that she filed for divorce from Hill, which was finalized the same year.

== Filmography ==
=== Films ===
Title	Year	Role	Ref.
1990	Without You I'm Nothing	Roxanne	
1990	Whatever Happened to Mason Reese	Model #2	Short
1993	For Love or Money	Model	
2016	Sharknado: The 4th Awakens	Tech Addison	TV movie
2019	How High 2	Herself	TV movie
2021	The Housewives of the North Pole	Herself	TV movie
2022	Cruel Instruction	Karen Adams	TV movie
2022	The Stepmother	Vanessa	
2023	Blossom	Doris Rowell	
2023	Under His Influence	Ashley	
2023	Rock the Boat	Carol	
2024	The Lost Holliday	Victoria Van Der Poole	
2024	Who’s Cheating Who	Maxine	

=== Television ===
Year	Title	Role	Notes	Ref.
1990	The Cosby Show	Sheniquah Watkins	Episode: "Just Thinking About It"	
1995	New York Undercover	Masseuse #2	Episode: "Catman Comes Back"	
2010–21, 2023–present	The Real Housewives of Atlanta	Herself	Main cast (seasons 3-13), guest (season 15), recurring (seasons 16–)	
2014	Married to Medicine	Herself	Episode: "Blind Date"	
2015	Below Deck	Herself	Episode: "The Real Housewives of Atlanta"	
2019	Married to Medicine	Herself	Episode: "Trouble in Spa-radise"	
2019	Last Call	Eloise	Episode: "Fifteen Minutes"	
2019	Star	Tasha Rae	Episode: "Toxic"	
2019	Tales	Sally	Episode: "Brothers"	
2021	1st Look	Herself	Episode: "Presents: Celebrity Sleepover -- Cynthia Bailey"	
2021	The Real Housewives Ultimate Girls Trip	Herself	Main cast (season 1)	
2021	Games People Play	N’Dasia	Recurring cast (season 2)	
2022	Celebrity Big Brother	Herself	Contestant: Season 3	
2022	Celebrity Beef	Herself	Episode: "Reality Royalty vs. Sitcom Star"	
2022	Single Drunk Female	Noreen	Episode: "I'm Sorry, But..."	
2022	Terror Lake Drive	Rose	Recurring cast (season 2)	
2023	Criss Angel's Magic with the Stars	Herself	Episode: "In Two"	
2023	The Real Housewives of New Jersey	Herself	Episode: "Teresa Gets Married"	
2023	See It Loud: The History of Black Television	Herself	Episode: "Keeping It Real"	
2023	The Real Housewives of Beverly Hills	Herself	Episode: "Ring Around the Rumor", "Dazed and Accused" & "Soirees and Separations"	
2024	BMF	Gloria	Recurring cast (season 3)	
2025	Got to Get Out	Herself	Contesant; season 1	
2025	Love Hotel	Herself	Episode: "The Love Boat"	
2026	The Real Housewives of Potomac	Herself	Episode: "She Said, She Said"	
2027	The Traitors †	Contestant	Season 5	

=== Music video appearances ===
Year	Artist	Song	Ref.
1989	New Order	"Round & Round"	
1994	Heavy D and The Boyz	"Nuttin' but Love"	
2013	Jaheim	"Age Ain't a Factor"	
2013	Jaheim	"Baby x3"	
2013	Jaheim	"Chase Forever"	
2019	Luann de Lesseps	"Feelin' Jovani"	

=== Documentary ===
Title	Year	Ref.
2015	Black Friday	
