= Phaedra Parks =

American television personality and attorney (b. 1971)

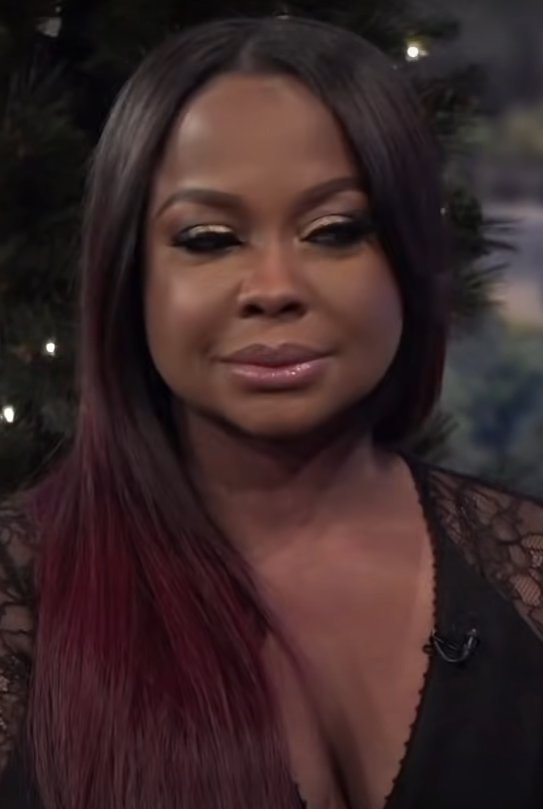
- Parks in 2018
- Born: Phaedra Creonta Parks; October 26, 1973 (age 53); Athens, Georgia, U.S.
- Education: Wesleyan College (BA); University of Georgia (JD)
- Occupations: Attorney; legal analyst; television personality; businesswoman; author; actress
- Years active: 2001–present
- Known for: Attorney to Bobby Brown; The Real Housewives of Atlanta (2010–2017, 2024–present)
- Spouse: Apollo Nida (m. 2009; div. 2017)
- Children: 2

Phaedra Creonta Parks (born October 26, 1973) is an American attorney, legal analyst, television personality, author, activist, and businesswoman.

Parks is best known for appearances on reality television, including, Bravo's The Real Housewives of Atlanta (2010–2017; 2024–present), Peacock's The Real Housewives Ultimate Girls Trip (2022; 2026), Married to Medicine (2023–2024), and The Traitors (2024).

== Early life ==
Parks was born in Athens, Georgia. She is one of four children to pastor parents Regina Bell and Henry Parks. Parks would attend Wesleyan College, where she earned a Bachelor of Arts degree with honors, before continuing her studies in 1995, at the University of Georgia School of Law, where she would undertake her Juris Doctor, graduating in 1997.

== Career ==
In 2000, Parks founded her Atlanta-based law firm, The Parks Group, which specializes in intellectual property and entertainment law. Parks first gained recognition for her legal representation of R&B singer Bobby Brown during his strand of legal cases in the 2000s. She's also represented producer Jazze Pha, songwriter Jermaine Dupri, and rapper Too Short. Parks has served on Georgia's Law School Alumni Council, the Grammy Recording Board, UGA Law School Board, and G-Capp. She has served as a legal analyst on shows like Fox News, CNN, NBC regarding the Michael Jackson trial. Parks has also acted as a television producer for BET's The Tiny and Toya Show. In December 2016, Parks was named Atlanta's most popular lawyer by the Fulton County District Attorney Paul Howard.

Parks gained wider recognition upon her casting in Bravo's reality series, The Real Housewives of Atlanta, in 2010. Her appearance on The Real Housewives of Atlanta helped her become nominated as one of Atlanta's top 100 Black women of influence, as her season 3 debut kick-started high publicity and positive attention for Parks. In 2013, Parks released her first book, Secrets of the Southern Belle: How to Be Nice, Work Hard, Look Pretty, Have Fun and Never Have an Off Moment.

In 2017, Parks was ultimately fired ahead of the show's tenth season following a rumor she circulated about fellow cast member Kandi Burruss and her husband Todd Tucker's intentions to drug and rape cast member Porsha Williams. Following her departure from RHOA, Bravo tentatively announced a new unscripted series focused on Parks alone titled, Rich People's Problems. The show was never released.

In 2020, Parks and then-boyfriend, Medina Islam, appeared on the season two premiere of Marriage Boot Camp: Hip Hop Edition She made her acting debut in Covenant, an eight-episode anthology series on Allblk, in October 2021. She played Bernice Whitfield, the family matriarch. In 2021, it was announced that Parks would be appearing on the second season of The Real Housewives Ultimate Girls Trip (subtitled Ex-Wives Club), the franchise's 'mash-up' series produced by Peacock featuring multiple well-known former housewives from the franchise.

In 2022, alongside Parks' RHUGT main cast appearance, she additionally starred in a recurring guest role in The Real Housewives of Dubai's first season, as a friend of housewife Caroline Brooks. Shereé Whitfield stated that Parks filmed for Season 14 of RHOA at her fashion show, however scenes featuring Parks were never aired. Rumours regarding Parks' return to RHOA in a full-time capacity have begun to swirl following executive producer Andy Cohen stating he would love to have her back, following her 2017 firing. Reportedly, her appearances on RHUGT, RHOA and RHODXB are to test whether her Bravo comeback appeals to audiences. Kandi Burruss has stated she would leave RHOA if Parks returns.

In January 2023, it was announced that Parks would return for the fifth season (and second Ex-Wives Club season) of The Real Housewives Ultimate Girls Trip, taking place in Marrakesh, Morocco and was set to premiere in 2024, but remains indefinitely shelved. Parks signed onto the tenth season of Married to Medicine, replacing Dr. Contessa Metcalfe and Anila Sajja. In September 2023, it was announced that Parks would be a contestant on Peacock's second season of The Traitors, which aired in early 2024. She was selected to be a 'traitor' and was banished in episode ten.

In July 2024, it was announced that Parks would be returning to The Real Housewives of Atlanta, after a six-season hiatus, for the sixteenth season. In September 2024, Parks was announced as one of the celebrities competing on season 33 of Dancing with the Stars. She was partnered with Valentin Chmerkovskiy.

== Personal life ==
Between 2009 and 2017, Parks was married to Apollo Nida. Nida was convicted of conspiracy to commit mail, wire, and bank fraud, but Parks has maintained she had no knowledge of his criminal activity. With Nida, she has two children. She dated Medina Islam before breaking up in 2021.

Regarding The Real Housewives of Atlanta and similar shows, Parks stated that she would "never" let her children watch the programs, saying "That's not child-appropriate" and "I don't think it was created for children and so I don't know if any responsible parent allows their child to watch those types of shows."

In 2026, Parks began dating MTV's The Challenge and The Traitors co-star, CT Tamburello.

== Filmography ==
=== Television ===
Year	Title	Role	Notes
2009	Tiny and Toya	Consulting producer	
2010–2017, 2024–	The Real Housewives of Atlanta	Herself	Main cast (seasons 3–9, 16–)
2011–2022	The Wendy Williams Show	Herself	
2012–2024	Watch What Happens Live with Andy Cohen	Herself	Guest
2014–2022	Dish Nation	Herself	Guest co-host in seasons 10 and 11
2015, 2023–2025	Married to Medicine	Herself	Guest (season 3); Main cast (seasons 10–11)
2018	Braxton Family Values	Herself	
2020	Marriage Boot Camp: Hip Hop Edition	Herself	1 episode
2021	Covenant	Bernice Whitfield	2 episodes
2022, 2026	The Real Housewives Ultimate Girls Trip	Herself	Main cast (season 2); Guest (season 5)
2022	The Real Housewives of Dubai	Herself	2 episodes
2023	The Real Housewives of New Jersey	Herself	1 episode
2024	The Traitors	Contestant – Traitor	7th Place (season 2)
2024	Dancing with the Stars	Contestant with Val Chmerkovskiy	8th place (season 33)
2024	Will Trent	Adela Blakely	1 episode
