= Kenya Moore =

American actress (born 1971)

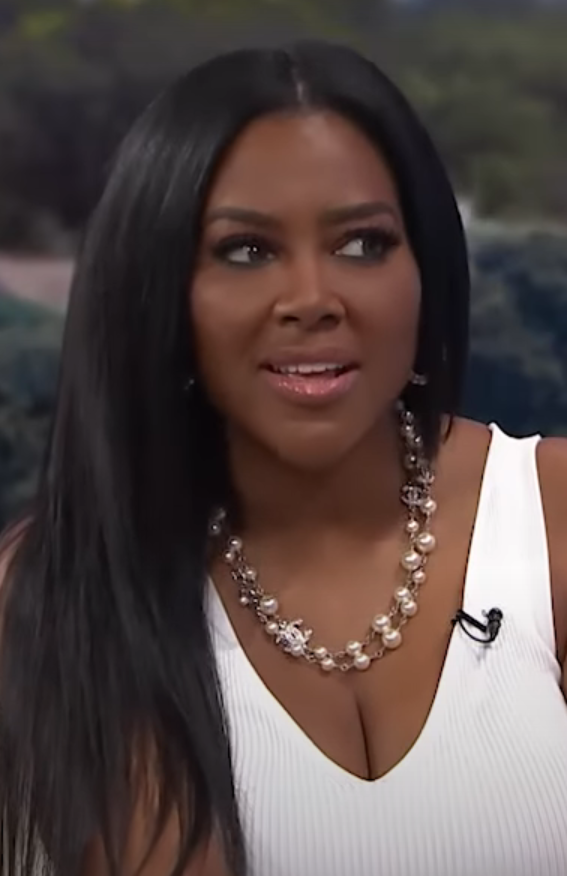
- Moore in 2019
- Born: Kenya Summer Moore; January 24, 1971 (age 55); Detroit, Michigan, U.S.
- Other name: Kenya Moore Daly
- Education: Wayne State University (BS)
- Occupations: Actress; author; entrepreneur; television personality
- Spouse: Marc Daly (m. 2017; div. 2024)
- Children: 1
- Beauty pageant titleholder
- Title: Miss Michigan USA 1993; Miss USA 1993
- Years active: 1992–present
- Major competitions: Miss Michigan USA 1993; (Winner); Miss USA 1993; (Winner); Miss Universe 1993; (Top 6)
- Website: kenyamoore.com

Signature
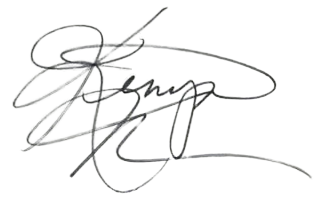

Kenya Summer Moore (born January 24, 1971) is an American actress, television personality, author, entrepreneur, and beauty pageant titleholder who won Miss USA 1993; however, she is likely better known for starring on The Real Housewives of Atlanta (2012–2025).

As an actress, she's appeared in films and television shows including; Waiting to Exhale (1995), Senseless (1998), The Parent 'Hood (1998–1999), In the House (1999), Deliver Us from Eva (2003), Girlfriends (2004), I Know Who Killed Me (2007).

== Early life and education ==
Moore was born on January 24, 1971 in Detroit, Michigan to teenagers Patricia Moore and Ronald Grant and raised by her paternal grandmother Doris Grant(1931–2017) and aunt after her mother abandoned her three days after her birth. The reality-TV-show star revealed that her mother never named her. "Since birth, my mother made the decision at age 16 to pretend she never had me. She has never spoken to me," Kenya wrote. "Even if present in the same room with other people and family, she pretends that I simply don't exist. She pretends I'm invisible," Kenya revealed on her Bravo blog. Moore graduated from Cass Technical High School in 1989. While still in high school, Moore experienced domestic violence from a much older boyfriend. In Moore's words, "He tormented me physically, mentally and once even nearly killed me by putting me into the hospital, from attacking me with a finger nail file… stabbing me with a finger nail file." Moore attended Wayne State University, where she majored in psychology and minored in communication.

== Career ==
=== Modeling and pageants ===
Moore began modeling at the age of 14, and was the January 1992 cover girl for Ebony Man magazine. She also modeled for the Ebony Fashion Fair cosmetic line. Moore has also appeared on the covers of Glamour, Seventeen, Ebony, and Essence magazines. At 22, Moore won Miss Michigan USA 1993 and then became the second African American woman to win Miss USA. She then represented the United States at Miss Universe 1993, and reached the top six. Her national costume was the Statue of Liberty.

=== Entertainment ===
==== Acting ====
Moore has appeared in TV shows including: The Fresh Prince of Bel-Air, Meet the Browns, Homeboys in Outer Space, Sparks, Smart Guy, Video Soul, Living Single, Damon, In the House, The Jamie Foxx Show, The Parent 'Hood, The Steve Harvey Show, Martin, Nubian Goddess, Men, Women & Dogs, The Parkers, Under One Roof, and Girlfriends she has appeared in the music videos for Jermaine Dupri's "Money Ain't a Thang" (1998), Nas's "Street Dreams" (1996), Shai's "I Don't Wanna Be Alone" (1996), and Tupac's "Temptations". Additionally, Moore has appeared in several films: Waiting to Exhale (1995), Senseless (1998), Trois (2000), Deliver Us from Eva (2003), Brothers in Arms (2005), Cloud 9 (2006), I Know Who Killed Me (2007), and Trapped: Haitian Nights (2010).

==== Production ====
Moore has also produced and directed various projects and launched her own company, Moore Vision Media in 2008. Moore Vision Media produced the erotic thriller "The Confidant". Moore is credited as producer/director of the film Trapped: Haitian Nights. After the project lost its director, Moore took over the production and completed the film. When the film failed to find distribution, Moore founded Moore Vision Media, an independent movie production and home-video distribution company. The company's first production was The Confidant, released by Universal Vivendi on August 24, 2010.

==== Reality television ====
In May 2012, Moore joined the season five cast of Bravo's The Real Housewives of Atlanta. In 2015, Moore was cast on The Celebrity Apprentice 7. Moore starred in The Real Housewives Ultimate Girls Trip, a spin-off featuring various women from The Real Housewives franchise, that premiered on Peacock in November 2021.

In September 2021, Moore was announced as one of the celebrities competing on season 30 of Dancing with the Stars. She and her professional dance partner, Brandon Armstrong, were the sixth couple to be eliminated, ultimately finishing in 10th place. In 2023, she placed 7th in the Fox reality competition series, Special Forces: World's Toughest Test.

In June 2024, it was reported that Moore would be exiting The Real Housewives of Atlanta following her suspension during the production of the sixteenth season, due to the allegations of revealing sexually explicit pictures of newcomer Brittany Eady.

=== Writing ===
On November 28, 2007, Moore published a book titled Game, Get Some!: What Women Really Want. Described as a how-to guide, the book is a self-help and conduct containing relationship advice, as well as the author's personal experiences regarding interpersonal and intimate relationships. Moore has stated about the book, "No one man can know everything there is to know about women, but with my help, they may just come close; I feel like the female Ms. Hitch! I want to bring us together not apart." The author reviews self-esteem and self-concept issues, offers sexual advice, discusses tips on mending a relationship or the proper way to break up. "If you have shared a special bond with someone you have dated, if you always treat her with respect, you will always have a friend at the end of the day." Moore writes.

=== Other activities ===
In 2012, Moore released her debut single, "Gone With the Wind Fabulous." In 2013, Moore released her own exercise video, named "Kenya Moore: Booty Boot Camp". This venture rivaled former Real Housewives co-star Phaedra Parks' own workout video and was a primary storyline in the show's fifth season. In 2014, Moore launched a hair care products brand, Kenya Moore Haircare.

== Personal life ==
In June 2017, Moore married businessman and restaurant owner Marc Daly. In April 2018, she announced that they were expecting their first child. On November 4, 2018, Moore gave birth to a daughter. Moore filed for divorce from Daly in August 2021. The divorce was finalized in June 2024.

=== Legal issues ===
In February 2026, a judge ordered Moore to pay $88,000 in unpaid rent and utilities for her salon, Kenya Moore Hair Spa, or vacate the property. Moore's landlord initially filed the suit in October 2025, claiming Moore stopped paying rent in December 2024, six months after its opening. While Moore denied the allegations, claiming the landlord failed to make requested improvements to the property, her production company, Moore Vision Media was ordered to pay $43,988 by the end of February 2026.

== Filmography ==
=== Film ===
| Year | Title | Role | Notes |
|---|---|---|---|
| 1995 | Waiting to Exhale | Denise | |
| 1998 | Senseless | Lorraine | |
| 2000 | Trois | Jasmine Davis | |
| 2001 | No Turning Back | Lia | |
| 2003 | Deliver Us from Eva | Renee Johnson | |
| 2003 | Hot Parts | Passion | Video |
| 2005 | Resurrection: The J.R. Richard Story | Leticia | |
| 2005 | Brothers in Arms | Mara | |
| 2006 | Cloud 9 | Champagne | |
| 2007 | I Know Who Killed Me | Jazmin | |
| 2010 | Trapped: Haitian Nights | Nadine | |
| 2010 | The Confidant | Eden Patterson | |
| 2013 | Haitian Nights | Nadine | |
| 2016 | Sharknado: The 4th Awakens | Monique | TV movie |
| 2024 | Abducted Off the Street: The Carlesha Gaither Story | Keisha | TV movie |

=== Television ===
| Year | Title | Role | Notes |
|---|---|---|---|
| 1994 | The Fresh Prince of Bel-Air | Dana | Episode: "Mothers Day" |
| 1995 | Soul Train | Herself/Guest Host | Episode: "Jon B/Soultry/Faith Evans" |
| 1996 | Martin | Lena Bozack | Episode: "You're All I Need" |
| 1996 | Homeboys in Outer Space | Nefertiti | Episode: "Super Bad Foxy Lady Killer or Ty and Morris Get the Shaft" |
| 1997 | Sparks | Ms. Collins | Episode: "I, Spy" |
| 1997 | Smart Guy | Vivian Kennedy | Episode: "Brother, Brother" |
| 1997 | Living Single | Lisa DeLongPre | Episode: "One Degree of Separation" |
| 1998 | Damon | Julia Burton | Episode: "The Designer" |
| 1998 | The Steve Harvey Show | Miss Gerard | Episode: "Educating Piggy" |
| 1998-99 | The Parent 'Hood | Celeste | Guest Cast: Seasons 4-5 |
| 1999 | Nubian Goddess | Herself/Host | Main Host |
| 1999 | The Jamie Foxx Show | Heidi | Episode: "Change of Heart" |
| 1999 | In the House | Valerie Bridgeforth | Recurring Cast: Season 5 |
| 2001 | Men, Women & Dogs | Carmen | Episode: "Sick as a Dog" |
| 2002 | The Parkers | Herself | Episode: "It's Showtime" |
| 2004 | Girlfriends | Kara | Guest Cast: Seasons 4-5 |
| 2009 | Meet the Browns | Tamiko | Episode: "Meet the Mom" |
| 2012–2025 | The Real Housewives of Atlanta | Herself | Main Cast: Seasons 5-10, 12–15, Guest: Seasons 11, 16 |
| 2013 | Walk This Way | Herself | Episode: "Abstinence" |
| 2013 | The Rickey Smiley Show | Evette | Episode: "The Reconciliation" |
| 2014 | Kandi's Wedding | Herself | Recurring Cast |
| 2015 | The Celebrity Apprentice | Herself/Contestant | Main Cast: Season 14 |
| 2015 | The Millionaire Matchmaker | Herself | Episode: "Kenya Moore/Taylor Dayne" |
| 2016 | Worst Cooks in America | Herself/Contestant | Main Cast: Season 9 |
| 2016 | The Real | Herself/Guest Co-Host | Episode: "Episode #3.33" & "#3.35" |
| 2018 | Hip Hop Squares | Herself/Panelist | Episode: "Episode #5.5" & "#5.8" |
| 2018 | Saints & Sinners | Nina Collier | Episode: "Personal, Not Business" |
| 2019 | Hollywood Medium with Tyler Henry | Herself | Episode: "Kenya Moore, Wendi McLendon-Covey, Macklemore" |
| 2019 | Porsha's Having a Baby | Herself | Episode: "P Is for Princess" |
| 2019 | Nashville Squares | Herself/Contestant | Episode: "Kenya Moore VS Cheslie Kryst" |
| 2020-21 | Family Reunion | Herself | Guest Cast: Seasons 2-3 |
| 2021 | MTV Cribs | Herself | Episode: "Kenya Moore & Johnny Orlando" |
| 2021 | The Real Housewives Ultimate Girls Trip | Herself | Main Cast: Season 1 |
| 2021 | Dancing with the Stars | Herself/Contestant | Main Cast: Season 30 |
| 2021 | Games People Play | Marlene | Episode: "There's No Place Like Home" |
| 2023 | Special Forces: World's Toughest Test | Herself/Contestant | Main Cast: Season 1 |
| 2023 | The Real Housewives of New Jersey | Herself | Episode: "Teresa Gets Married" |
| 2023 | Celebrity Family Feud | Herself/Contestant | Episode: "Episode #10.6" |

=== Music Videos ===
| Year | Title | Artist | Role |
|---|---|---|---|
| 1993 | "Stay in My Corner" | Keith Washington | Love Interest |
| 1995 | "Temptations" | 2Pac | Girl in First Room |
| 1996 | "Street Dreams" | Nas | Ginger McKenna |
| 1998 | "Money Ain't a Thang" | Jermaine Dupri and Jay-Z | Love Interest |
| 2023 | "Already Know" | Drew Sidora | Roller Skater |

== Awards and nominations ==
| Year | Association | Category | Result | Ref. |
|---|---|---|---|---|
| 2014 | Real Housewives Awards | Most Memorable Outfit | Won | |
| 2014 | Real Housewives Awards | Rookie of the Year | Won | |
| 2022 | People's Choice Awards | The Reality TV Star of 2022 | Nominated | |
