= List of The Real Housewives of Atlanta episodes =

The Real Housewives of Atlanta is an American reality television series that debuted October 7, 2008, and airs on Bravo. It is the third installment of The Real Housewives franchise with a peach serving as a symbol for the series, as the state of Georgia is a renowned peach growing area and one of the well-known streets in Atlanta is known as Peachtree Street. The Real Housewives of Atlanta is one of the highest-rated installments of the franchise as well as one of the most-watched series on the Bravo network. The series' seventeenth season chronicles eight women in Atlanta– Phaedra Parks, Porsha Williams, Drew Sidora, Kelli Potter, Shamea Morton Mwangi, Angela Oakley, Pinky Cole and K. Michelle–as they balance their personal and business lives, along with their social circle.

Former cast members featured over the previous seasons are: NeNe Leakes (1–7, 10–12), DeShawn Snow (1), Shereé Whitfield (1–4, 9–10, 14–15), Lisa Wu (1–2), Kim Zolciak-Biermann (1–5), Kandi Burruss (2–15), Cynthia Bailey (3–13), Kenya Moore (5–10, 12–15), Claudia Jordan (7), Kim Fields (8), Eva Marcille (11–12), Shamari DeVoe (11), Marlo Hampton (14–15), Sanya Richards-Ross (14–15) and Brit Eady (16).

As of August 23, 2026, a total of 360 original episodes of The Real Housewives of Atlanta have aired.

== Series overview ==
The Real Housewives of Atlanta episodes
Season	Episodes	Originally released		Average Viewers
Season	Episodes	First released	Last released	Average Viewers
1	8	October 7, 2008	November 25, 2008	1.52
2	16	July 30, 2009	November 12, 2009	2.71
3	18	October 4, 2010	February 20, 2011	2.86
4	24	November 6, 2011	April 22, 2012	2.85
5	24	November 4, 2012	April 28, 2013	3.10
6	27	November 3, 2013	May 18, 2014	3.73
7	25	November 9, 2014	May 10, 2015	3.08
8	21	November 8, 2015	April 10, 2016	2.85
9	25	November 6, 2016	May 14, 2017	2.62
10	22	November 5, 2017	April 29, 2018	2.20
11	23	November 4, 2018	May 12, 2019	1.96
12	26	November 3, 2019	May 24, 2020	1.79
13	21	December 6, 2020	May 9, 2021	1.25
14	20	May 1, 2022	September 25, 2022	0.95
15	18	May 7, 2023	September 10, 2023	0.87
16	20	March 9, 2025	July 27, 2025	0.58
17	20	April 5, 2026	August 23, 2026	0.69

== Episodes ==
=== Season 1 (2008) ===
NeNe Leakes, DeShawn Snow, Shereé Whitfield, Lisa Wu, and Kim Zolciak-Biermann are introduced as series regulars.

The Real Housewives of Atlanta season 1 episodes
No. overall	No. in season	Title	Original release date	Prod. code	U.S. viewers (millions)
1	1	"Welcome One, Welcome ATL"	October 7, 2008	101	0.66
2	2	"It's My Party!"	October 14, 2008	102	1.18
3	3	"Who's Your Poppa?"	October 21, 2008	103	1.32
4	4	"Bring on the Bling"	October 28, 2008	104	N/A
5	5	"Out of Tune"	November 4, 2008	105	1.00
6	6	"Dream a Little Nightmare"	November 11, 2008	106	1.49
7	7	"Best of Enemies"	November 18, 2008	107	2.21
8	8	"Reunion Special"	November 25, 2008	108	2.82
9	9	"The Lost Footage"	July 23, 2009	N/A	N/A

=== Season 2 (2009) ===
DeShawn Snow departed as a series regular. Kandi Burruss joined the cast.

The Real Housewives of Atlanta season 2 episodes
No. overall	No. in season	Title	Original release date	U.S. viewers (millions)
10	1	"New Attitude, Same ATL"	July 30, 2009	2.66
11	2	"Kim-tervention"	August 6, 2009	N/A
12	3	"Unbeweavable"	August 13, 2009	N/A
13	4	"Mummies, Mommies, and Baby Mommas"	August 20, 2009	2.82
14	5	"Home Is Where the Heartbreak Is"	August 27, 2009	2.47
15	6	"My Ego Is Bigger Than Your Ego"	September 3, 2009	3.06
16	7	"Throwing Shade"	September 10, 2009	N/A
17	8	"Scrambled Egos"	September 17, 2009	N/A
18	9	"Precious Pocketbook"	September 24, 2009	N/A
19	10	"Better Tardy Than Never"	October 1, 2009	N/A
20	11	"High Heels & Record Deals"	October 8, 2009	2.56
21	12	"Baby Momma & Daddy Drama"	October 15, 2009	2.63
22	13	"Catwalks & Cat Fights"	October 22, 2009	2.97
23	14	"Reunion Part One"	October 29, 2009	2.80
24	15	"Reunion Part Two"	November 5, 2009	2.44
25	16	"The Lost Footage"	November 12, 2009	N/A

=== Season 3 (2010–2011) ===
Lisa Wu departed as a series regular. Cynthia Bailey and Phaedra Parks joined the cast.

The Real Housewives of Atlanta season 3 episodes
No. overall	No. in season	Title	Original release date	U.S. viewers (millions)
26	1	"New Attitude"	October 4, 2010	2.41
27	2	"Model Behavior"	October 11, 2010	2.26
28	3	"White Hot"	October 18, 2010	2.24
29	4	"Petty Boughetto"	October 25, 2010	2.49
30	5	"Hot Mama's Day"	November 1, 2010	2.74
31	6	"Trashed Collection"	November 7, 2010	2.49
32	7	"She Can Dance?"	November 14, 2010	2.77
33	8	"Is There a Doctor in the House?"	November 21, 2010	2.99
34	9	"NeNe Get Your Gun"	November 28, 2010	3.22
35	10	"Auto-Tuned-Up"	December 5, 2010	3.22
36	11	"Contract Player"	December 12, 2010	2.92
37	12	"Not So Fine Print"	December 19, 2010	3.21
38	13	"Tour-ture"	January 9, 2011	3.34
39	14	"Flamingo Road Block"	January 16, 2011	3.27
40	15	"Floridon't"	January 23, 2011	3.42
41	16	"The Bride and the Doom"	January 30, 2011	4.38
42	17	"Reunion: Part 1"	February 13, 2011	2.40
43	18	"Reunion: Part 2"	February 20, 2011	2.65

=== Season 4 (2011–2012) ===
Marlo Hampton served in a recurring capacity.

The Real Housewives of Atlanta season 4 episodes
No. overall	No. in season	Title	Original release date	U.S. viewers (millions)
N–A	0	"Before They Were Stars"	October 30, 2011	1.87
44	1	"Nothing Ventured, Nothing Gained"	November 6, 2011	2.89
45	2	"Surprisingly Rich"	November 13, 2011	3.00
46	3	"Shower the Baby, Muzzle the Boy"	November 20, 2011	3.23
47	4	"Jewels Be Dangled"	November 27, 2011	3.03
48	5	"Whine Bar"	December 4, 2011	3.25
49	6	"Three Wigs and a Baby"	December 11, 2011	3.28
50	7	"Law by Sheree"	December 13, 2011	2.85
51	8	"New Tricks"	December 18, 2011	3.41
52	9	"Unlikely Duos"	January 8, 2012	3.14
53	10	"We Come in Peace (And Packing Heat)"	January 15, 2012	2.71
54	11	"Shaping Up and Shipping Out"	January 22, 2012	2.77
55	12	"South Africa: Just Like Home"	January 29, 2012	3.94
56	13	"Make It Rain Down in Africa"	February 12, 2012	2.34
57	14	"No Bones About It"	February 19, 2012	2.48
58	15	"From Motherland to Haterville"	March 4, 2012	2.66
59	16	"Peaches and Screams"	March 11, 2012	2.29
60	17	"The Error Apparents"	March 18, 2012	2.46
61	18	"Fresh Princes"	March 25, 2012	2.64
62	19	"All Pomp But No Circumstance"	April 1, 2012	2.04
63	20	"Happiness & Joy"	April 8, 2012	2.31
64	21	"Reunion: Part 1"	April 15, 2012	3.13
65	22	"Reunion: Part 2"	April 19, 2012	2.54
66	23	"Reunion: Part 3"	April 22, 2012	3.22
67	24	"Kim & Kroy"	February 26, 2012	N/A

=== Season 5 (2012–2013) ===
Shereé Whitfield departed as a series regular. Kim Zolciak-Biermann departed as a series regular after episode 6. Kenya Moore and Porsha Williams joined the cast.

The Real Housewives of Atlanta season 5 episodes
No. overall	No. in season	Title	Original release date	U.S. viewers (millions)
68	0	"Hairstylists Tell All"	October 28, 2012	1.26
69	1	"Got Sexy Back"	November 4, 2012	3.22
70	2	"Excess Breeds Success"	November 11, 2012	2.55
71	3	"Call Me Miss U.S.A."	November 18, 2012	2.48
72	4	"Unmoved"	November 25, 2012	2.25
73	5	"No Excuse for Excuses"	December 2, 2012	3.01
74	6	"Hold on to Your Weave"	December 9, 2012	3.20
75	7	"I Do...But, I Won't"	December 16, 2012	3.60
76	8	"Fools of Engagement"	December 23, 2012	3.16
77	9	"Dress Down and Strip Bare"	December 30, 2012	3.50
78	10	"Off the Hook"	January 6, 2013	3.67
79	11	"This Donkey Kicks"	January 13, 2013	3.40
80	12	"Battle of the Booty"	January 20, 2013	3.25
81	13	"Make an Ass Out of a Donkey"	January 27, 2013	4.09
82	14	"Prayed Up"	February 10, 2013	2.70
83	15	"Praise the Pageant"	February 17, 2013	2.60
84	16	"Peaches Don't Grow in Hollywood"	March 3, 2013	3.06
85	17	"Strip is a Trip"	March 10, 2013	2.71
86	18	"He's Stalking, I'm Walking"	March 17, 2013	2.74
87	19	"Donktabulous!"	March 24, 2013	2.80
88	20	"Divas into Icons"	March 31, 2013	3.02
89	21	"Reunion: Part One"	April 7, 2013	3.63
90	22	"Reunion: Part Two"	April 14, 2013	3.52
91	23	"Reunion: Part Three"	April 21, 2013	3.75
92	24	"Secrets Revealed"	April 28, 2013	2.43

=== Season 6 (2013–2014) ===
The Real Housewives of Atlanta season 6 episodes
No. overall	No. in season	Title	Original release date	Prod. code	U.S. viewers (millions)
93	1	"Bye Bye With the Wind"	November 3, 2013	601	3.10
94	2	"Girl Code Breakers"	November 10, 2013	602	3.33
95	3	"All in a Day's Twerk"	November 17, 2013	603	3.69
96	4	"Too Late to Apollo-Gize"	November 24, 2013	604	3.29
97	5	"Save the Drama For Mama"	December 1, 2013	605	3.10
98	6	"The Old Lady and the Shoe"	December 8, 2013	606	3.77
99	7	"Savann-No"	December 15, 2013	607	3.47
100	8	"Ghosts of Girlfriends Past"	December 22, 2013	608	3.67
101	9	"Midnight in the Garden of Tea and Shade"	December 29, 2013	609	3.82
102	10	"A Trip Down Memory Lane"	January 5, 2014	610	4.51
103	11	"Crunk in the Trunk"	January 12, 2014	611	4.18
104	12	"Sour Grapes, Sour Peaches"	January 19, 2014	612	3.69
105	13	"Pillow Talk or Pillow Fight"	January 26, 2014	613	3.91
106	14	"Peaches Divided"	February 9, 2014	614	4.63
107	15	"Dropping the Ball"	February 16, 2014	615	4.06
108	16	"Twirling With the Enemy"	February 23, 2014	616	4.04
109	17	"He Said, She Said"	March 9, 2014	617	3.91
110	18	"Flirting With Disaster"	March 16, 2014	618	4.30
111	19	"Mexi-Loco"	March 23, 2014	619	4.26
112	20	"With Friends Like These"	March 30, 2014	620	3.94
113	21	"Mess Rehearsal"	April 6, 2014	621	3.66
114	22	"Final Curtain Call"	April 13, 2014	622	3.81
115	23	"Reunion Part 1"	April 20, 2014	623	4.13
116	24	"Reunion Part 2"	April 27, 2014	624	4.14
117	25	"Reunion Part 3"	May 4, 2014	625	4.29
118	26	"Secrets Revealed"	May 11, 2014	626-90	1.79
119	27	"Husbands Revealed"	May 18, 2014	627	2.12

=== Season 7 (2014–2015) ===
Porsha Williams departed as a series regular; she continued to appear in a recurring capacity. Claudia Jordan joined the cast. Demetria McKinney also served in a recurring capacity.

The Real Housewives of Atlanta season 7 episodes
No. overall	No. in season	Title	Original release date	Prod. code	U.S. viewers (millions)
120	1	"Bye Bye and Bon Voyage"	November 9, 2014	701	3.83
121	2	"No Moore Apollogies"	November 16, 2014	702	3.60
122	3	"All Tea All Shade"	November 23, 2014	703	3.14
123	4	"Bury The Ratchet"	November 30, 2014	704	2.86
124	5	"Friend Or Faux"	December 7, 2014	705	3.06
125	6	"Make-ups And Breakdowns"	December 14, 2014	706	2.80
126	7	"Nice To Metria"	December 21, 2014	707	2.82
127	8	"Tea With A Side Of Squashed Beef"	December 28, 2014	708	3.16
128	9	"50 Shades Of Shade"	January 4, 2015	709	3.35
129	10	"Puerto Read-co!"	January 11, 2015	710	3.53
130	11	"Divide And "ki-ki""	January 18, 2015	711	3.19
131	12	"Beauties in the Fast Lane"	January 25, 2015	712	3.44
132	13	"The Countdown Begins"	February 8, 2015	713	2.62
133	14	"Hello Mr. Chocolate"	February 15, 2015	714	2.85
134	15	"Chocolate Does A Body Good"	March 1, 2015	715	3.74
135	16	"Southern Discomfort"	March 8, 2015	716	3.60
136	17	"Fix It Therapy"	March 15, 2015	717	3.14
137	18	"Housewife Interrupted"	March 22, 2015	718	3.23
138	19	"Drama Detox"	March 29, 2015	719	2.98
139	20	"From Zen to Sin"	April 5, 2015	720	2.59
140	21	"Chasing Nay-Nay"	April 12, 2015	721	2.63
141	22	"Atlanta Twirls On"	April 19, 2015	722	2.98
142	23	"Reunion Part 1"	April 26, 2015	723	3.38
143	24	"Reunion Part 2"	May 3, 2015	724	2.83
144	25	"Reunion Part 3"	May 10, 2015	725	2.59

=== Season 8 (2015–2016) ===
NeNe Leakes and Claudia Jordan departed as series regulars. Porsha Williams rejoined the cast as a series regular. Kim Fields joined the cast. Shereé Whitfield and Shamea Morton Mwangi served in recurring capacities.

The Real Housewives of Atlanta season 8 episodes
No. overall	No. in season	Title	Original release date	Prod. code	U.S. viewers (millions)
145	1	"The Shades of It All"	November 8, 2015	801	2.97
146	2	"Duking It Out"	November 15, 2015	802	3.09
147	3	"Party in a Sweatbox"	November 22, 2015	803	2.62
148	4	"Rocky Boat Horror Story"	November 29, 2015	804	2.80
149	5	"Where is the Love Boat?"	December 6, 2015	805	2.99
150	6	"Bienvenido a Miami"	December 13, 2015	806	3.02
151	7	"Miami Spice"	December 20, 2015	807	2.86
152	8	"There's No Business Like Friend Business"	December 27, 2015	808	2.98
153	9	"Shade for Days"	January 3, 2016	809	3.04
154	10	"Trouble on the Family Tree"	January 10, 2016	810	2.94
155	11	"Ms. Parks Goes to Washington"	January 17, 2016	811	3.18
156	12	"Beauties & the Beat"	January 24, 2016	812	2.85
157	13	"Jamaican Beef Catty"	January 31, 2016	813	3.08
158	14	"Peaches of the Caribbean"	February 14, 2016	814	2.60
159	15	"Read School Is in Session"	February 21, 2016	815	3.17
160	16	"Turning Over a New Peach"	March 6, 2016	816	2.85
161	17	"Who's Been Naughty, Who's Been Nice"	March 13, 2016	817	2.52
162	18	"Reunion Part One"	March 20, 2016	818	3.01
163	19	"Reunion Part Two"	March 27, 2016	819	2.78
164	20	"Reunion Part Three"	April 3, 2016	820	2.81
165	21	"Secrets Revealed"	April 10, 2016	821	1.76

=== Season 9 (2016–2017) ===
Kim Fields departed as a series regular. Shereé Whitfield rejoined the cast as a series regular.

The Real Housewives of Atlanta season 9 episodes
No. overall	No. in season	Title	Original release date	Prod. code	U.S. viewers (millions)
166	1	"House of Shade and Dust"	November 6, 2016	901	2.59
167	2	"Housewife House Wars"	November 13, 2016	902	2.65
168	3	"Ghosts of Boyfriends Past"	November 20, 2016	903	2.49
169	4	"Another Spin Around the Block"	November 27, 2016	904	2.55
170	5	"Shade Grenade"	December 4, 2016	905	2.74
171	6	"Tastes Like Trouble"	December 11, 2016	906	2.61
172	7	"Model Behavior"	December 18, 2016	907	2.56
173	8	"Bosom Buddies"	January 1, 2017	908	2.28
174	9	"Char-lotta Drama"	January 8, 2017	909	2.60
175	10	"Uncharitable Behavior"	January 15, 2017	910	2.63
176	11	"Thelma and Louise Take Flint"	January 22, 2017	911	2.47
177	12	"Into The Woods"	January 29, 2017	912	2.62
178	13	"If These Woods Could Talk"	February 12, 2017	913	2.25
179	14	"Loose Lips Sink Ships"	February 19, 2017	914	2.60
180	15	"Lei It All on the Table"	March 5, 2017	915	2.59
181	16	"Maui Mayhem"	March 12, 2017	916	2.65
182	17	"Aloha & Goodbye"	March 19, 2017	917	2.48
183	18	"Baby Nups & Breakups"	March 26, 2017	918	2.64
184	19	"Side Dishes and Side Pieces"	April 2, 2017	919	2.58
185	20	"Chateau She Did That"	April 9, 2017	920	2.69
186	21	"Reunion Part One"	April 16, 2017	921	2.80
187	22	"Reunion Part Two"	April 23, 2017	922	2.95
188	23	"Reunion Part Three"	April 30, 2017	923	2.76
189	24	"Reunion Part Four"	May 7, 2017	924	3.15
190	25	"Secrets Revealed"	May 14, 2017	925	1.47

=== Season 10 (2017–2018) ===
Phaedra Parks departed as a series regular. NeNe Leakes rejoined the cast as a series regular. Kim Zolciak-Biermann, Marlo Hampton and Eva Marcille served in recurring capacities.

The Real Housewives of Atlanta season 10 episodes
No. overall	No. in season	Title	Original release date	Prod. code	U.S. viewers (millions)
191	1	"50 Shades of Cynthia"	November 5, 2017	1001	2.43
192	2	"Say Yes to Distress"	November 12, 2017	1002	2.56
193	3	"Chateau Get Down"	November 19, 2017	1003	2.20
194	4	"All White Never Forget Showdown"	November 26, 2017	1004	2.11
195	5	"Petty Party"	December 3, 2017	1005	2.31
196	6	"All Aboard the Shady Express"	December 10, 2017	1006	2.64
197	7	"Rock the Boat"	December 17, 2017	1007	2.34
198	8	"A Mad Tea Party"	January 7, 2018	1008	2.27
199	9	"The Peaches of Wrath"	January 14, 2018	1009	2.35
200	10	"Storming Out"	January 21, 2018	1010	2.23
201	11	"Tea Is of the Essence"	January 28, 2018	1011	1.99
202	12	"Peaches Be Trippin'"	February 11, 2018	1012	2.24
203	13	"Livin' la Villa Loca"	February 18, 2018	1013	2.13
204	14	"Barcelona Breakdown"	February 25, 2018	1014	2.29
205	15	"Let There Be Light and Love"	March 11, 2018	1015	2.00
206	16	"Driving Miss Kim"	March 18, 2018	1016	2.07
207	17	"ReMarcable"	March 25, 2018	1017	1.97
208	18	"Nightmare on Peachtree Street"	April 1, 2018	1018	1.93
209	19	"Reunion Part One"	April 8, 2018	1019	2.44
210	20	"Reunion Part Two"	April 15, 2018	1020	2.53
211	21	"Reunion Part Three"	April 22, 2018	1021	2.32
212	22	"10th Anniversary Special"	April 29, 2018	1022	1.07

=== Season 11 (2018–2019) ===
Shereè Whitfield and Kenya Moore departed as series regulars. Eva Marcille and Shamari DeVoe joined the cast. Marlo Hampton and Tanya Sam served in recurring capacities.

The Real Housewives of Atlanta season 11 episodes
No. in series	No. in season	Title	Original release date	U.S. viewers (millions)
213	1	"To Love and to Cherish"	November 4, 2018	1.93
214	2	"South Peach"	November 11, 2018	1.84
215	3	"A New Addition"	November 18, 2018	1.86
216	4	"Pass the Peach, Throw the Shade"	November 25, 2018	1.86
217	5	"Tatted Tales"	December 2, 2018	1.94
218	6	"Whining and Dining"	December 9, 2018	2.04
219	7	"Sisterhood of Traveling Peaches"	December 16, 2018	1.82
220	8	"Final Destin-ation"	December 23, 2018	1.65
221	9	"A Mother's Love"	December 30, 2018	1.77
222	10	"The Wrong Road"	January 6, 2019	2.12
223	11	"Texts, Lies & Therapy"	January 13, 2019	2.23
224	12	"The Peaches of Tokyo"	January 20, 2019	1.81
225	13	"Tempers in Tokyo"	January 27, 2019	2.15
226	14	"Lost in Translation"	February 10, 2019	1.63
227	15	"Let's Make It Official"	February 17, 2019	1.95
228	16	"Bye Wig, Hello Drama"	March 3, 2019	1.96
229	17	"Welcome to the Dungeon"	March 10, 2019	2.08
230	18	"The Model Bride"	March 17, 2019	2.08
231	19	"No Money, Mo' Problems"	March 24, 2019	2.05
232	20	"Caught in the Middle"	March 31, 2019	2.14
233	21	"Reunion Part 1"	April 7, 2019	2.35
234	22	"Reunion Part 2"	April 14, 2019	2.09
235	23	"Reunion Part 3"	April 21, 2019	1.67

=== Season 12 (2019–2020) ===
Shamari DeVoe departed as a series regular. Kenya Moore rejoined the cast as a series regular. Marlo Hampton and Tanya Sam served in recurring capacities.

The Real Housewives of Atlanta season 12 episodes
No. in series	No. in season	Title	Original release date	U.S. viewers (millions)
236	1	"The Moore the Merrier"	November 3, 2019	1.91
237	2	"Cheatin' Heart"	November 10, 2019	1.85
238	3	"The Float Goes On"	November 17, 2019	1.86
239	4	"Love, Marriage, and Sour Peaches"	November 24, 2019	1.93
240	5	"The Regift That Keeps on Giving"	December 1, 2019	1.97
241	6	"Where There's a Wig, There's a Way"	December 8, 2019	1.80
242	7	"What Would Michelle O Do?"	December 15, 2019	1.75
243	8	"Head Over Hills"	December 22, 2019	1.78
244	9	"A Whine of a Time"	December 29, 2019	1.99
245	10	"Living on the Edge"	January 5, 2020	2.00
246	11	"Snake Bye"	January 12, 2020	2.01
247	12	"A Hairy Situation"	January 19, 2020	1.75
248	13	"Hot Tea With a Side of Cookies"	February 9, 2020	1.70
249	14	"Lions, and Tigers and Shade"	February 16, 2020	1.66
250	15	"Kenya vs. Ken"	February 23, 2020	1.86
251	16	"In The Name of Charity"	March 1, 2020	1.94
252	17	"Greece Is the Word"	March 8, 2020	1.78
253	18	"A Greek Tragedy in 6 Acts"	March 15, 2020	1.78
254	19	"Ruined Peaches"	March 22, 2020	1.98
255	20	"More Love More Problems"	April 5, 2020	1.74
256	21	"Moving Up and Moving On"	April 12, 2020	1.67
257	22	"A Star Is Born"	April 19, 2020	1.86
258	23	"Secrets Revealed"	April 26, 2020	1.30
259	24	"Reunion Part 1"	May 10, 2020	1.64
260	25	"Reunion Part 2"	May 17, 2020	1.71
261	26	"Reunion Part 3"	May 24, 2020	1.40

=== Season 13 (2020–2021) ===
NeNe Leakes and Eva Marcille departed as series regulars. Drew Sidora joined the cast. Marlo Hampton, Tanya Sam and LaToya Ali served in recurring capacities.

The Real Housewives of Atlanta season 13 episodes
No. overall	No. in season	Title	Original release date	U.S. viewers (millions)
262	1	"No Justice, No Peace"	December 6, 2020	1.42
263	2	"New Peach in the Orchard"	December 13, 2020	1.19
264	3	"Ten Ten, Twenty Twenty"	December 20, 2020	1.21
265	4	"From One Surprise to Another"	January 3, 2021	1.22
266	5	"Don't Come for Me Unless I've Invited You"	January 10, 2021	1.18
267	6	"The Giving Peach"	January 17, 2021	1.22
268	7	"The Jet Set and the Upset"	January 24, 2021	1.33
269	8	"Beach, Please!"	January 31, 2021	1.40
270	9	"The Hostess With the Least-est"	February 14, 2021	1.10
271	10	"What Happened in the Dungeon?"	February 21, 2021	1.43
272	11	"The Usual Suspects"	February 28, 2021	1.41
273	12	"Front Page News"	March 7, 2021	1.15
274	13	"10.10.20"	March 14, 2021	1.09
275	14	"If You’ve Got It, Haunt It"	March 21, 2021	1.18
276	15	"Cajun Peaches"	March 28, 2021	1.32
277	16	"Hurricane Housewives"	April 4, 2021	1.17
278	17	"A Whole Lot of Mess"	April 11, 2021	1.21
279	18	"How the Wig Stole Christmas"	April 18, 2021	1.39
280	19	"Reunion Part 1"	April 25, 2021	1.27
281	20	"Reunion Part 2"	May 2, 2021	1.18
282	21	"Reunion Part 3"	May 9, 2021	1.08

=== Season 14 (2022) ===
Cynthia Bailey and Porsha Williams departed as series regulars. Shereé Whitfield rejoined the cast as a series regular. Marlo Hampton and Sanya Richards-Ross joined the cast. Monyetta Shaw-Carter served in a recurring capacity.

The Real Housewives of Atlanta season 14 episodes
No. overall	No. in season	Title	Original release date	U.S. viewers (millions)
283	1	"The Edge of Fashion"	May 1, 2022	0.93
284	2	"All Aboard the Gaslight Express"	May 8, 2022	0.74
285	3	"The Tea Is Served"	May 15, 2022	0.85
286	4	"Big Apple Squabbles"	May 22, 2022	0.99
287	5	"She by Herself"	June 5, 2022	0.81
288	6	"Don't Be Sea Salty"	June 12, 2022	1.01
289	7	"Who Gon Check on Me, Boo?"	June 19, 2022	0.83
290	8	"Healthy Glows and Low Blows"	June 26, 2022	0.72
291	9	"Midnight in the Chateau of Good & Evil"	July 10, 2022	0.94
292	10	"Guess Who's Coming to Blue Ridge"	July 17, 2022	0.92
293	11	"Cabin Fever"	July 24, 2022	0.99
294	12	"Trust (Planning) Issues"	July 31, 2022	1.02
295	13	"A Rum Punch to the Gut"	August 7, 2022	1.03
296	14	"Montego Baes"	August 14, 2022	0.97
297	15	"Not Michelle Obama"	August 21, 2022	1.01
298	16	"It's Expensive to Be She"	August 28, 2022	0.96
299	17	"A Fashion Show With Fashions"	September 4, 2022	1.04
300	18	"Reunion Part 1"	September 11, 2022	1.03
301	19	"Reunion Part 2"	September 18, 2022	1.05
302	20	"Reunion Part 3"	September 25, 2022	1.13

=== Season 15 (2023) ===
Monyetta Shaw-Carter and Courtney Rhodes served in recurring capacities.

The Real Housewives of Atlanta season 15 episodes
No. overall	No. in season	Title	Original release date	U.S. viewers (millions)
303	1	"Who's Gonna Check My New Boo?"	May 7, 2023	0.83
304	2	"Sisters Before Misters"	May 14, 2023	0.74
305	3	"A Star is Re-Born"	May 21, 2023	0.77
306	4	"The Buck Stops in Birmingham"	May 28, 2023	0.66
307	5	"Drama for Yo Mama"	June 4, 2023	0.81
308	6	"Rap Sheets and Old Beefs"	June 11, 2023	0.92
309	7	"Keeping It Gucci"	June 18, 2023	0.79
310	8	"Rollerskates and Blind Dates"	June 25, 2023	0.72
311	9	"Better Late Than Ugly"	July 9, 2023	0.84
312	10	"Healing by Sheree"	July 16, 2023	0.89
313	11	"Make Ups, Slip Ups and Cover Ups"	July 23, 2023	0.86
314	12	"Sex, Lies and Video-Phones"	July 30, 2023	0.81
315	13	"Peach Passion"	August 6, 2023	0.78
316	14	"Wreck-It, Ralph"	August 13, 2023	0.78
317	15	"Sip & Spill...the Tea"	August 20, 2023	0.89
318	16	"Art Imitates Life"	August 27, 2023	0.79
319	17	"Reunion Part 1"	September 3, 2023	0.83
320	18	"Reunion Part 2"	September 10, 2023	0.99

=== Season 16 (2025) ===
Shereé Whitfield, Kandi Burruss, Kenya Moore, Marlo Hampton and Sanya Richards-Ross departed as series regulars. Phaedra Parks and Porsha Williams rejoined the cast as series regulars. Brit Eady, Shamea Morton Mwangi, Angela Oakley and Kelli Potter joined the cast. Cynthia Bailey served in a recurring capacity.

The Real Housewives of Atlanta season 16 episodes
No. overall	No. in season	Title	Original release date	U.S. viewers (millions)
321	1	"Welcome Back Peaches"	March 9, 2025	0.72
322	2	"Hot Dogs & Hot Mics"	March 16, 2025	0.67
323	3	"High Notes and Cheap Shots"	March 23, 2025	0.64
324	4	"The Vault"	March 30, 2025	0.56
325	5	"About Last Night"	April 6, 2025	0.62
326	6	"Peace, Interrupted"	April 13, 2025	0.57
327	7	"Nashville Hold Em"	April 20, 2025	0.50
328	8	"Boots on the Ground"	April 27, 2025	0.58
329	9	"Blame It on the Henny"	May 4, 2025	0.63
330	10	"Meditation and Mediation"	May 11, 2025	0.55
331	11	"Let's Be Honest"	May 18, 2025	0.53
332	12	"The Frack Is Back"	May 25, 2025	0.46
333	13	"Chapter 1: Reset"	June 1, 2025	0.65
334	14	"Chapter 2: Renew"	June 8, 2025	0.58
335	15	"Chapter 3: Rebirth"	June 15, 2025	0.54
336	16	"Chicken and Waffles"	June 22, 2025	0.49
337	17	"Game Over"	June 29, 2025	0.69
338	18	"Reunion Part 1"	July 13, 2025	0.54
339	19	"Reunion Part 2"	July 20, 2025	0.54
340	20	"Reunion Part 3"	July 27, 2025	0.59

=== Season 17 (2026) ===
Brit Eady departed as a series regular. Pinky Cole and K. Michelle joined the cast. Cynthia Bailey served in a recurring capacity.

The Real Housewives of Atlanta season 17 episodes
No. overall	No. in season	Title	Rating (18–49)	Original release date	US viewers (millions)
341	1	"A Warm Welcome"	0.12	April 5, 2026	0.62
342	2	"Rumors and Raised Eyebrows"	0.15	April 12, 2026	0.71
343	3	"Rum, Ruptures & Redemption"	0.14	April 19, 2026	0.69
344	4	"Where's the Beef... and the Budget?"	0.12	April 26, 2026	0.69
345	5	"Dynasty Divas in Atlanta"	0.17	May 3, 2026	0.69
346	6	"Saddle Up and Settle Scores"	0.13	May 10, 2026	0.57
347	7	"Dynasty, Diamonds and Drama"	0.13	May 17, 2026	0.61
348	8	"A Sound Bath Breakdown"	0.10	May 24, 2026	0.56
349	9	"Picking Up the Peaches"	0.15	May 31, 2026	0.65
350	10	"Star Spangled Mess"	0.12	June 7, 2026	0.59
351	11	"Shady Text and Bigger Regrets"	0.10	June 14, 2026	0.52
352	12	"The Glow Up Cost"	0.10	June 21, 2026	0.55
353	13	"Kilts, Chaos & Reads"	0.10	June 28, 2026	0.47
354	14	"Highland Games and Explosive Claims"	0.09	July 12, 2026	0.57
355	15	"Waking the Dead"	0.10	July 19, 2026	0.50
356	16	"Halloween Hot Pocket"	0.12	July 26, 2026	0.55
357	17	"Rebels & Outlaws"	0.11	August 2, 2026	0.58
358	18	"Reunion Part 1"	0.11	August 9, 2026	0.56
359	19	"Reunion Part 2"	0.13	August 16, 2026	0.62
360	20	"Reunion Part 3"	0.11	August 23, 2026	0.61
