= The Real Housewives of Atlanta season 13 =

Television season

The Real Housewives of Atlanta
- Season 13
- Cover used by the iTunes Store; Left to right: Bailey, Burruss, Moore, Williams and Sidora
- Starring: Kandi Burruss; Cynthia Bailey; Kenya Moore; Porsha Williams; Drew Sidora
- No. of episodes: 21

Release
- Original network: Bravo
- Original release: December 6, 2020 – May 9, 2021

Season chronology
- ← Previous; Season 12 Next → Season 14

The thirteenth season of The Real Housewives of Atlanta, an American reality television show, was broadcast by Bravo, it premiered on December 6, 2020, and is primarily filmed in Atlanta, Georgia. Its executive producers are Steven Weinstock, Glenda Hersh, Lauren Eskelin, Lorraine Haughton-Lawson, Luke Neslage, Glenda Cox, Joye Chin, and Andy Cohen.

The Real Housewives of Atlanta focuses on the lives of Kandi Burruss, Cynthia Bailey, Kenya Moore, Porsha Williams and Drew Sidora.

This season marked the final regular appearance of Cynthia Bailey.

This season marked the second departure of Porsha Williams. She eventually returned for the show’s 16th season.

== Cast ==
For the thirteenth season, four of the six cast members from the previous season returned. Eva Marcille departed the series, along with NeNe Leakes, who exited the series for a second time. Actress and singer, Drew Sidora joined the cast as a Housewife, while newcomer, LaToya Ali joined Marlo Hampton, and Tanya Sam as friends of the cast.

In addition to this, Falynn Pina and Shamea Morton made multiple guest appearances throughout the season. While former housewives: Shereé Whitfield, Claudia Jordan and Eva Marcille also appeared as guests in attendance at Cynthia and Mike's wedding.

== Production ==
Production on the season began in mid-July 2020. In November of the same year, production on the series was halted after a crew member tested positive for COVID-19; production resumed the following month. The reunion was filmed late March 2021.

== Episodes ==
The Real Housewives of Atlanta season 13 episodes
No. overall	No. in season	Title	Original release date	U.S. viewers (millions)
262	1	"No Justice, No Peace"	December 6, 2020	1.42
Porsha Williams attends a rally for the Black Lives Matter movement in Louisville, Kentucky. Meanwhile, back in Atlanta, Cynthia Bailey and Mike Hill begin to experience relationship troubles when planning their upcoming wedding. Kandi Burruss prepares to send her daughter off to college. Kenya Moore begins to wonder if her marriage is worth saving.
263	2	"New Peach in the Orchard"	December 13, 2020	1.19
264	3	"Ten Ten, Twenty Twenty"	December 20, 2020	1.21
265	4	"From One Surprise to Another"	January 3, 2021	1.22
266	5	"Don't Come for Me Unless I've Invited You"	January 10, 2021	1.18
267	6	"The Giving Peach"	January 17, 2021	1.22
268	7	"The Jet Set and the Upset"	January 24, 2021	1.33
269	8	"Beach, Please!"	January 31, 2021	1.40
270	9	"The Hostess With the Least-est"	February 14, 2021	1.10
271	10	"What Happened in the Dungeon?"	February 21, 2021	1.43
The ladies participate in a BDSM-themed surprise bachelorette party for Bailey involving a male stripper. In CCTV footage, the ladies continue with an hours-long after-party, which shows LaToya Ali, Tanya Sam, Drew Sidora and Williams engaging in sexual activities in the living room, which leads to accusations of a threesome between Sam, Williams and the stripper.
272	11	"The Usual Suspects"	February 28, 2021	1.41
273	12	"Front Page News"	March 7, 2021	1.15
274	13	"10.10.20"	March 14, 2021	1.09
275	14	"If You’ve Got It, Haunt It"	March 21, 2021	1.18
276	15	"Cajun Peaches"	March 28, 2021	1.32
277	16	"Hurricane Housewives"	April 4, 2021	1.17
278	17	"A Whole Lot of Mess"	April 11, 2021	1.21
279	18	"How the Wig Stole Christmas"	April 18, 2021	1.39
280	19	"Reunion Part 1"	April 25, 2021	1.27
281	20	"Reunion Part 2"	May 2, 2021	1.18
282	21	"Reunion Part 3"	May 9, 2021	1.08
