= Porsha's Family Matters =

Television series

- Also known as: The Real Housewives of Atlanta: Porsha's Family Matters
- Genre: Reality television
- Starring: Porsha Williams; Simon Guobadia; Lauren Williams; Dennis McKinley; Diane T. Williams; Esther James; Gina Clayton
- Country of origin: United States
- Original language: English
- No. of seasons: 1
- No. of episodes: 7

Production
- Executive producers: Porsha Williams; Joye Chin; Tom Ciaccio; Charles Davis; Lauren Eskelin; Lorraine Haughton; Glenda Hersh; Julie Bob Lombardi; Steven Weinstock; Ronica Wynder
- Producers: Donya Blaze; Peta Phipps
- Cinematography: Doug Longwill
- Camera setup: Multiple
- Running time: 43 minutes
- Production company: Truly Original

Original release
- Network: Bravo
- Release: November 28, 2021 – January 16, 2022

Related
- The Real Housewives of Atlanta; Porsha's Having a Baby; Porsha's Family Matters

The Real Housewives of Atlanta: Porsha's Family Matters is an American reality television series that premiered on Bravo on November 28, 2021. Developed as a limited spin-off of The Real Housewives of Atlanta, the series aired for one season and follows Porsha Williams and members of her family during her engagement to Simon Guobadia.

== Premise ==
In May 2021, Porsha Williams announced she was engaged to Simon Guobadia, the then-husband of her friend and The Real Housewives of Atlanta costar Falynn Pina, after dating for one month. As a result of the close timing between the engagement and Guobadia's divorce from Pina, Williams and Guobadia were accused of having an extramarital affair and received significant criticism from fans. Porsha's Family Matters follows the reactions of her friends and family to Williams's sudden engagement and the controversy surrounding her relationship with Guobadia.

== Cast ==
=== Main Cast ===
- Porsha Williams
- Simon Guobadia
- Lauren Williams
- Dennis McKinley
- Diane T. Williams
- Esther James
- Gina Clayton

=== Guests ===
- Drew Sidora
- Shamea Morton
- Yolanda Favors
- Yandy Smith-Harris
- Jennifer Williams

== Episodes ==
| No. | Title | Original release date | U.S. viewers (millions) |
|---|---|---|---|
| 1 | "The Legendary Ms. Williams" | November 28, 2021 | 0.87 |
With a milestone birthday approaching, Porsha makes moves to celebrate and settle into a new life with her fiancé, Simon. Meanwhile, her family begins to question the speed of her engagement, and Dennis struggles to fully support Porsha's love life.
| 2 | "Guess Who's Coming to Lunch" | December 5, 2021 | 0.78 |
An unexpectedly emotional cookout leaves the whole family with questions. Porsha grapples with the future of her blended family, and Simon is put on the hotseat by Porsha's protective tribe. Dennis navigates his role as father and co-parent and Mama Gina turns a lunch with Porsha into a real "tea" party.
| 3 | "Not Without My Robe" | December 12, 2021 | 0.63 |
As the entire family prepares for their trip to Mexico, Porsha and Lauren focus on getting Simon and Dennis to join the retreat. Lauren's plan for family healing comes to a screeching halt when Porsha finds out Dennis' intentions for coming on the trip may not be genuine as she thought.
| 4 | "Dennis the Menace" | December 19, 2021 | 0.63 |
With the family in turmoil, Porsha's vision of a blended family looks more bleak than blended. Lauren struggles to maintain control of the spiritual path she had envisioned, and Dennis breaks the rules by bringing a surprise guest.
| 5 | "Spilling the Tea-quilla" | January 2, 2022 | 0.71 |
As the family vacation continues, Dennis pleads with the family to look out for Porsha. Lauren holds Porsha accountable for her actions, and a day of fun leads to an unexpected night that may destroy Porsha's hopes for a blended family.
| 6 | "Ghost of Porsha's Past" | January 9, 2022 | 0.74 |
Family tensions explode past the point of no return, leaving Porsha's blended family in limbo. Back in Atlanta, Porsha has to pick up the pieces and navigate through the mess left behind.
| 7 | "Can't Get Right" | January 16, 2022 | 0.77 |
Back in Atlanta, Porsha prepares for Pilar's upcoming surgery, while Aunt Liz hopes to reunite the family at the grand opening of Hosea Helps. Porsha and Dennis attempt to finalize the details of their co-parenting plan.

== Aftermath ==
Following the events of Porsha's Family Matters, Williams and Guobadia ended their marriage in February 2024. Their divorce was finalized in July 2025 after Guobadia lost multiple suits against Williams over their marital assets and alleged defamation by Williams.

In August 2024, Yolanda "Londy" Favors, a recurring cast member and cousin to Williams, passed away at the age of 34. Williams reacted to her death during an episode of the sixteenth season of The Real Housewives of Atlanta.
