= The Real Housewives of Atlanta =

American reality television series

- Genre: Reality television
- Created by: Princess Banton-Lofters
- Starring: NeNe Leakes; Shereé Whitfield; DeShawn Snow; Lisa Wu; Kim Zolciak-Biermann; Kandi Burruss; Cynthia Bailey; Phaedra Parks; Kenya Moore; Porsha Williams; Claudia Jordan; Kim Fields; Shamari DeVoe; Eva Marcille; Drew Sidora; Marlo Hampton; Sanya Richards-Ross; Brit Eady; Shamea Morton Mwangi; Angela Oakley; Kelli Potter; Pinky Cole; K. Michelle
- Country of origin: United States
- Original language: English
- No. of seasons: 17
- No. of episodes: 360 (list of episodes)

Production
- Executive producers: Glenda Hersh; Lauren Eskelin; Lorraine Haughton-Lawson; Anthony Sylvester; Glenda N. Cox; Luke Neslage; Anne Swan; Carlos King; Andy Cohen; Steven Weinstock
- Producers: Jason Cavanagh; Irina Grobman; Sybil Dessau; Bianca Barnes; Sean O'Brien; Giovanni Wilson; Lauren Ranzino; Daniel Blau Rogge; Brad Hurtado
- Camera setup: Multiple
- Running time: 41–43 minutes
- Production companies: True Entertainment (seasons 1–9); Truly Original (season 10–present)

Original release
- Network: Bravo
- Release: October 7, 2008 – present

Related
- Don't Be Tardy...; The Kandi Factory; I Dream of NeNe: The Wedding; Kandi's Wedding; Kandi's Ski Trip; Xscape: Still Kickin' It; Kandi Koated Nights; Porsha's Having a Baby; Porsha's Family Matters; Kandi & The Gang

The Real Housewives of Atlanta, abbreviated RHOA, is an American reality television series that premiered on Bravo on October 7, 2008. Developed as the third installment of The Real Housewives franchise, it has aired seventeen seasons and focuses on the personal and professional lives of several women residing in and around Atlanta, Georgia.

The cast of the current seventeenth season consists of Phaedra Parks, Porsha Williams, Drew Sidora, Shamea Morton, Angela Oakley, Kelli Potter, Pinky Cole, and K. Michelle, with former housewife Cynthia Bailey serving as a "friend of the housewives.” Previously featured cast members include original housewives NeNe Leakes, DeShawn Snow, Shereé Whitfield, Lisa Wu, and Kim Zolciak-Biermann. Subsequent housewives include Kandi Burruss, Kenya Moore, Claudia Jordan, Kim Fields, Shamari DeVoe, Eva Marcille, Marlo Hampton, Sanya Richards-Ross, and Brit Eady.

The Real Housewives of Atlanta has received moderately favorable reviews from critics and has been recognized as a "guilty pleasure" by several media outlets. However, the series has been criticized for appearing to fabricate portions of its storyline. It has anchored Bravo's Sunday night offerings since the show's third season in 2010, eventually becoming Bravo's highest-rated program by 2014.

The success of the show has resulted in ten spin-offs: Don't Be Tardy, The Kandi Factory, I Dream of NeNe: The Wedding, Kandi's Wedding, Kandi's Ski Trip, Xscape: Still Kickin' It, Kandi Koated Nights, Porsha's Having a Baby, Porsha's Family Matters and Kandi & The Gang.

== Production ==
=== Seasons 1–4 ===
The Real Housewives of Atlanta was announced as the third installment in The Real Housewives franchise, intending to capitalize on the successes of its predecessors The Real Housewives of Orange County and New York City. Throughout its run, the show has been led by five to eight housewives, who are credited by their first name. The first season premiered on October 7, 2008, starred Nene Leakes, DeShawn Snow, Sheree Whitfield, Lisa Wu and Kim Zolciak .

Kandi Burruss joined the show in the second season, which premiered on July 30, 2009. Snow did not return. The producer informed Snow that during the reunion, they had expected a stronger reaction from her upon learning what some of the other cast members had said. However, Snow stated that she preferred not to engage in dramatic behavior for television. Premiering on October 4, 2010, the third season saw Wu depart as a Housewife, appearing as a guest, as well as the addition of Cynthia Bailey and Phaedra Parks. The fourth season which premiered on November 6, 2011, saw no changes to the main cast, besides introducing Marlo Hampton as the first official "Friend of the Housewives".

=== Seasons 5–11 ===
Whitfield did not return for the fifth season, while Kenya Moore and Porsha Williams joined the show as series regulars. It premiered on November 4, 2012. Zolciak quit the show halfway through filming. The sixth season premiered on November 3, 2013. Like the fourth season, the sixth season saw no major cast changes after Kim Zolciak-Biermann’s departure. Hampton made a guest appearance. After a physical altercation between cast members Moore and Williams at the sixth season's reunion, the seventh season, which premiered on November 9, 2014, saw Williams demoted to a recurring "friend" role, alongside newcomer Demetria McKinney, and Claudia Jordan, who joined as a main housewife.

The eighth season premiered on November 8, 2015. Season eight saw the full-time return of Williams, Burruss, Moore, Parks, and Bailey. Leakes, Jordan, and McKinney exited the series. The season also saw the introduction to actress Kim Fields, who joined in a main capacity. Whitfield also returned as a "friend" alongside newcomer Shamea Morton. Leakes, Jordan, Hampton and McKinney made guest appearances throughout the season. The ninth season premiered on November 6, 2016, with Whitfield returning in a full-time capacity. Fields did not return. Hampton made numerous guest appearances along with Morton, while original housewives Wu and Zolciak appeared in the season finale. Parks was fired ahead of the tenth season after it was revealed she spread rumors that Burruss and her husband, Todd Tucker, wanted to drug and rape Williams and Morton.

Leakes returned as a full-time cast member for the tenth season, which premiered on November 5, 2017. Zolciak and Hampton returned as a friend of the housewives, alongside Eva Marcille. Morton and Wu appeared throughout the season as well. Whitfield, for the second time, and Moore left the show after the tenth season. Marcille was promoted to a full-time capacity, alongside the addition of Shamari DeVoe for the eleventh season, which premiered on November 4, 2018. The season also introduced Tanya Sam as a new friend of the housewives, alongside Hampton. Moore appeared as a guest alongside Morton.

=== Seasons 12–15 ===
The twelfth season premiered on November 3, 2019, with Moore returning full-time, and Hampton and Sam returning in recurring capacities. DeVoe did not return. Morton appeared as a guest. Marcille and Leakes announced their departure from the show in June 2020 and September 2020 respectively. The thirteenth season premiered on December 6, 2020, with Drew Sidora joining as the newest Housewife. LaToya Ali joined as "friend of the housewives" alongside Hampton and Sam. Marcille returned as a guest alongside Morton as well as former housewives, Whitfield and Jordan. Bailey and Williams departed the series in September 2021.

The fourteenth season premiered on May 1, 2022. Burruss, Moore and Sidora returned, along with Hampton being promoted to a full-time cast member, after seasons in recurring and guest capacities. Whitfield also returned as a full-time cast member for a third time, along with the additions of Sanya Richards-Ross as a housewife, and Monyetta Shaw-Carter being introduced as a "friend of the housewives". Original housewives, Snow and Wu returned as guests. The fifteenth season premiered on May 7, 2023. Whitfield, Burruss, Moore, Sidora, Hampton and Richards-Ross returned to the series. Shaw-Carter returned as a friend of the housewives, along with Courtney Rhodes. Morton and Ali appeared as guests, alongside former housewives Snow, Wu, Zolciak-Biermann and Bailey.

=== Season 16 to present ===
In February 2024, it was announced the show would be returning for a sixteenth season when Burruss announced she had decided to depart the series. Burruss became the first housewife across the entire franchise to appear on fourteen seasons. Following Burruss' departure, Marlo Hampton and Sanya Richards-Ross both confirmed their departures from the show. Following the cast exits, Porsha Williams and Moore announced their returns to the series via Instagram videos.

In May 2024, the cast for the sixteenth season was revealed with Williams, Moore and Sidora all returning, along with Morton being promoted to a full-time cast member, after appearing in recurring and guest capacities, former housewife Bailey returning as a "friend of the housewives", and newcomers Angela Oakley, Brit Eady and Kelli Ferrell joining the cast. Whitfield departed the show for the third time. On June 14, 2024, it was revealed that Moore would immediately cease filming Season 16 indefinitely, due to allegations of an incident in which she knowingly distributed sexually explicit material depicting fellow cast member Brit Eady. On July 29, 2024, it was announced that Phaedra Parks would be returning to The Real Housewives of Atlanta, after a six-season hiatus as a full-time cast member for the sixteenth season.

The sixteenth season premiered on March 9, 2025. Williams, Parks, Sidora, Eady, Ferrell, Morton and Oakley were confirmed as full-time cast members, with Bailey in the previously announced "friend of the housewives" role. Moore was demoted to a guest capacity following her issues during filming with Eady. Former cast members DeVoe and Shaw-Carter appeared as guests. In July 2025, Eady announced her departure from the series after one season. On February 24, 2026, it was announced that the seventeenth season would premiere on April 5 of the same year. All cast members returned, except for Eady, while Pinky Cole and singer K. Michelle joined the series as new housewives. Jordan appeared as a guest.

== Cast ==
=== Timeline of cast members ===
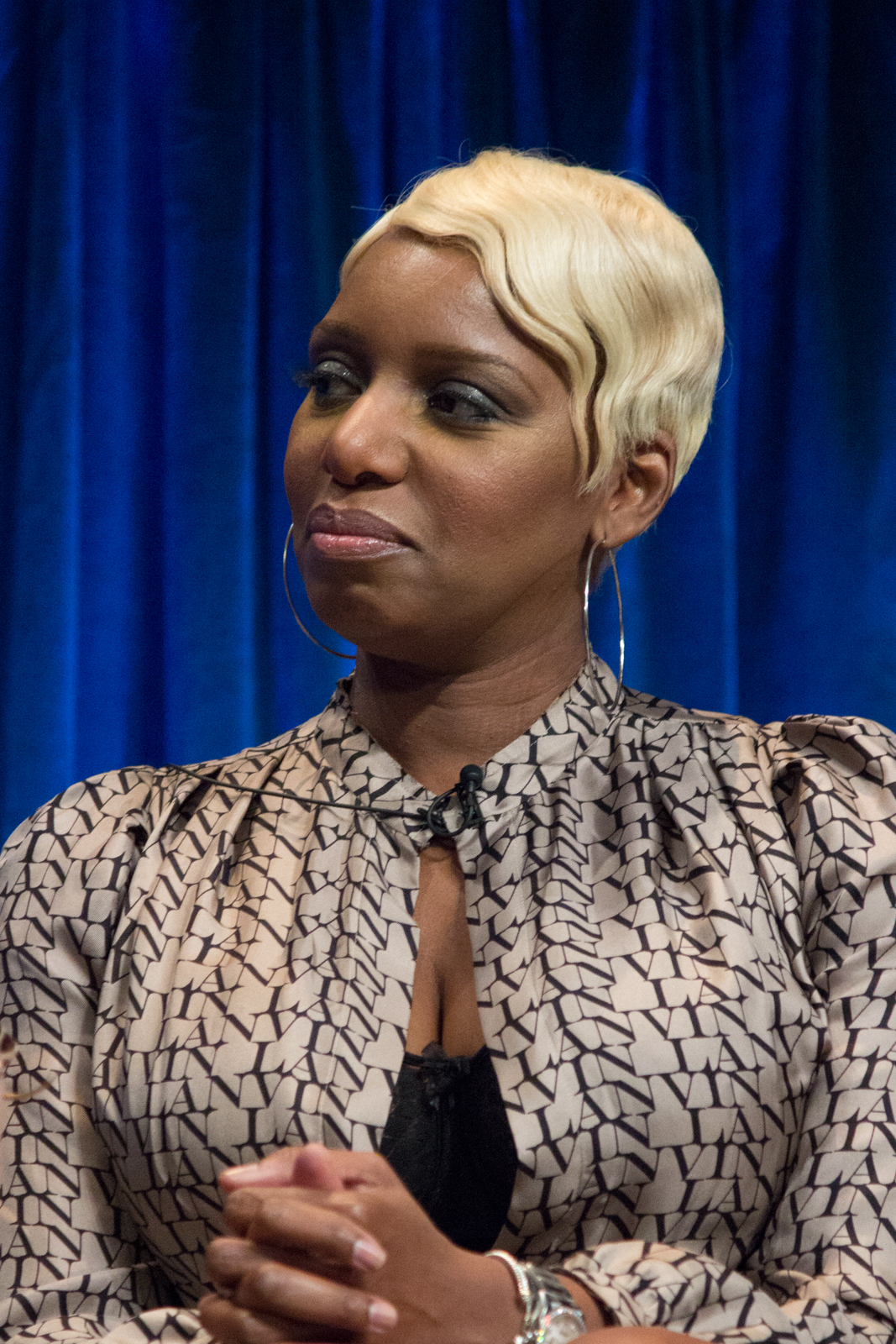
NeNe Leakes

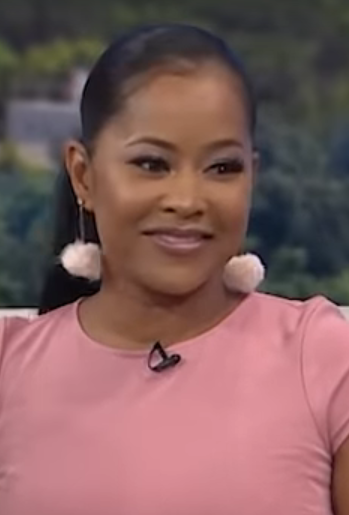
Lisa Wu

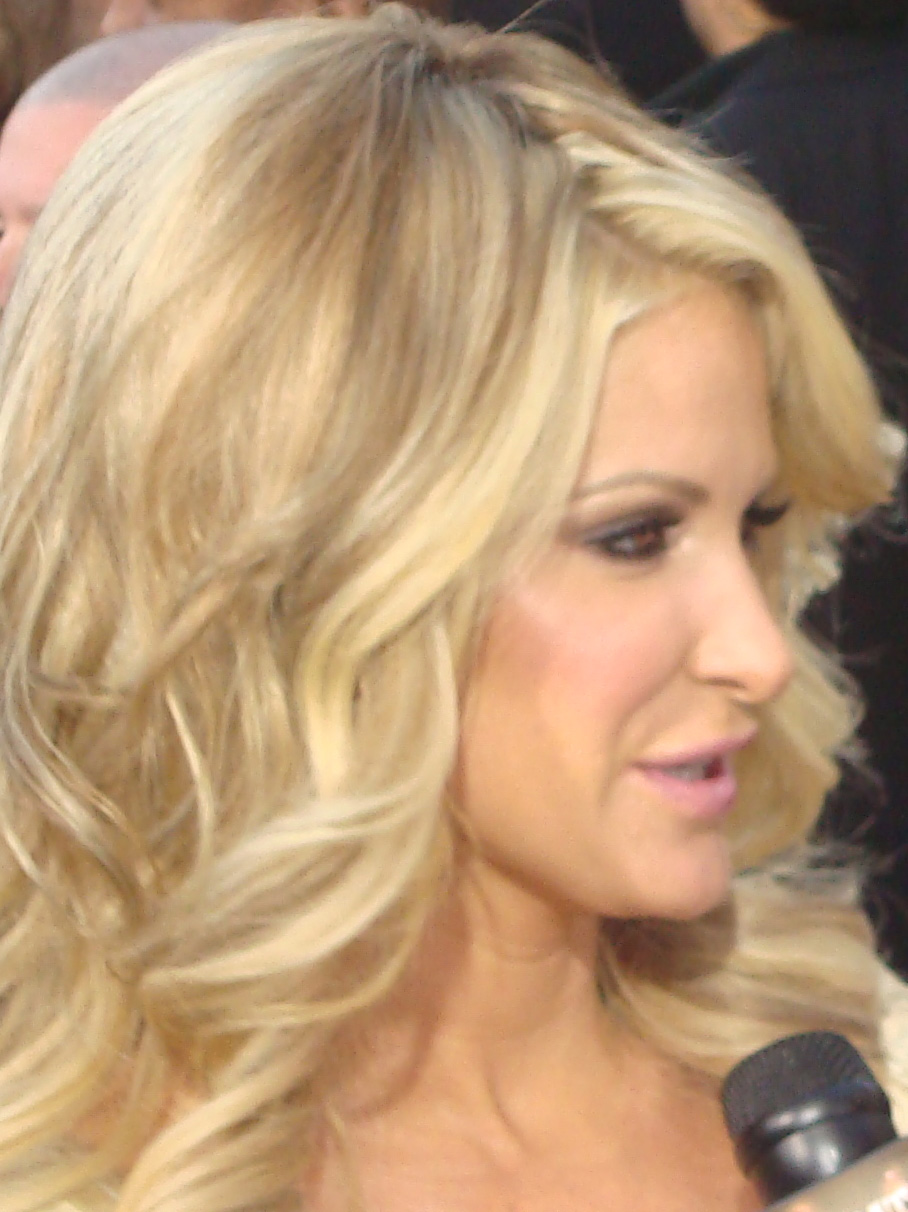
Kim Zolciak

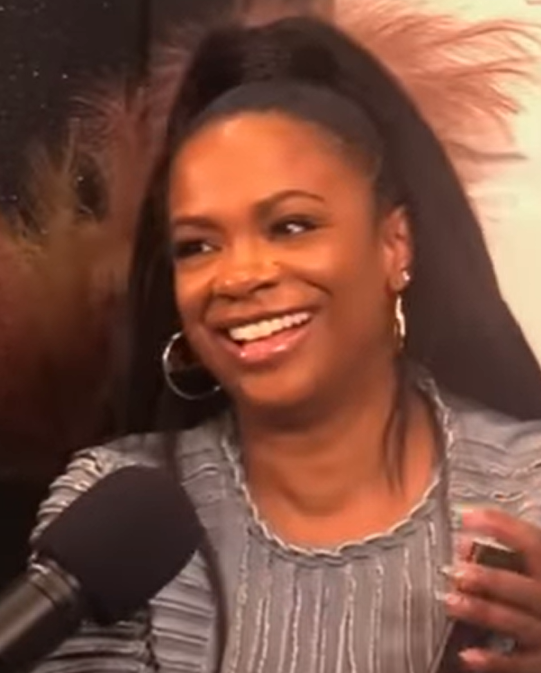
Kandi Burruss

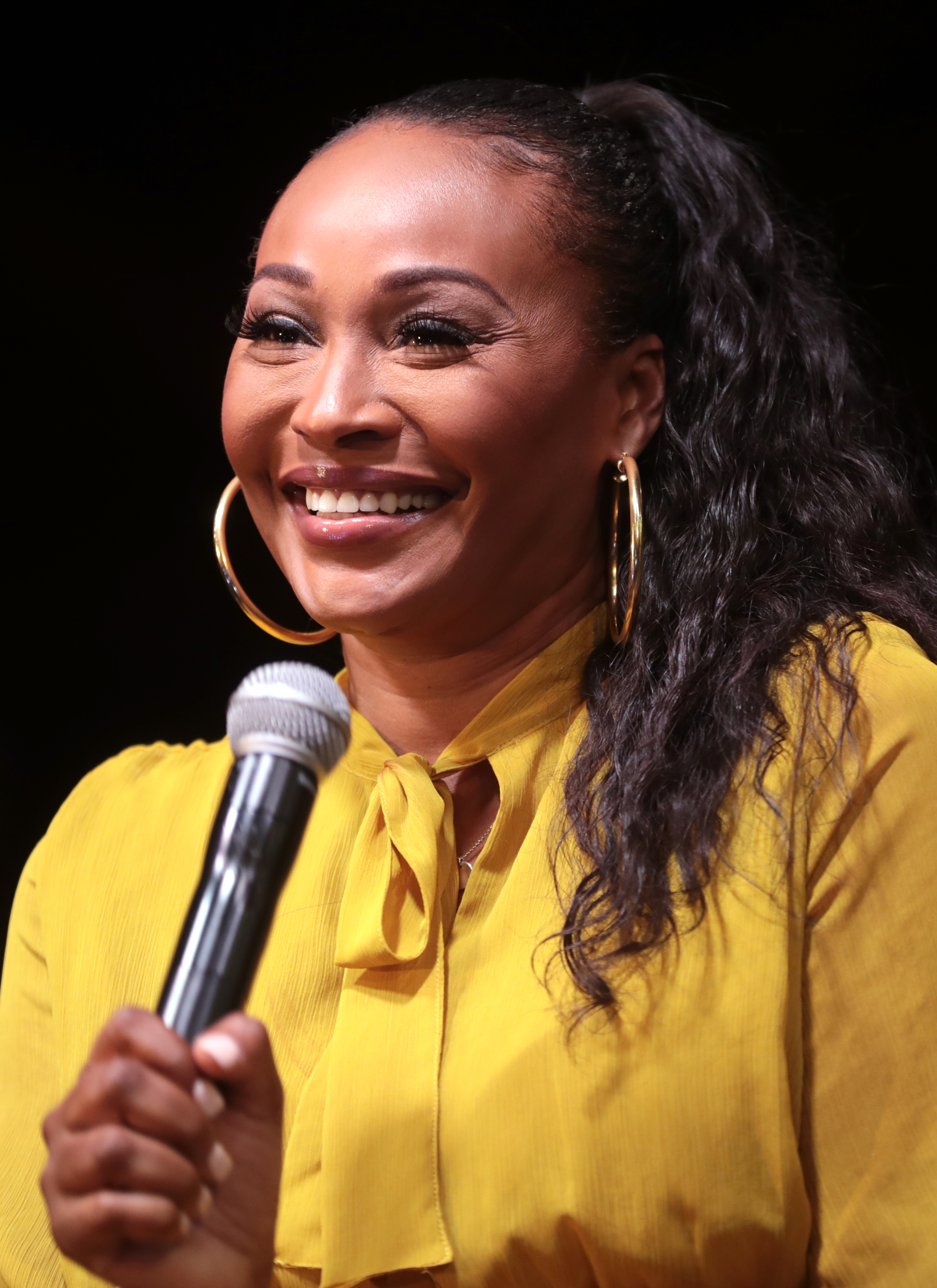
Cynthia Bailey

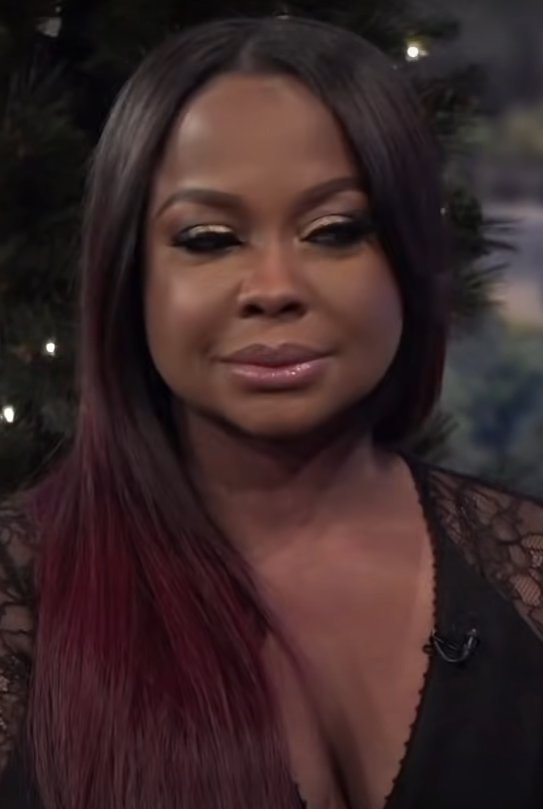
Phaedra Parks

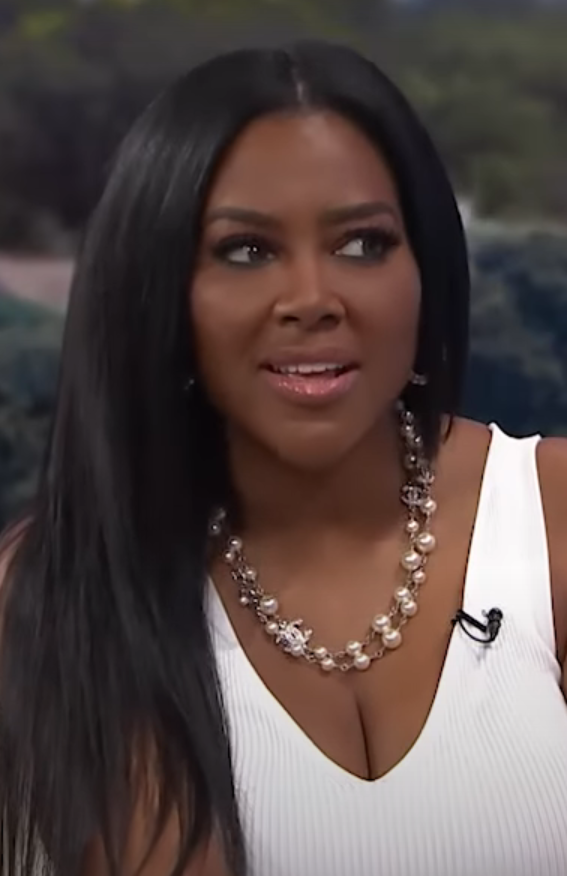
Kenya Moore

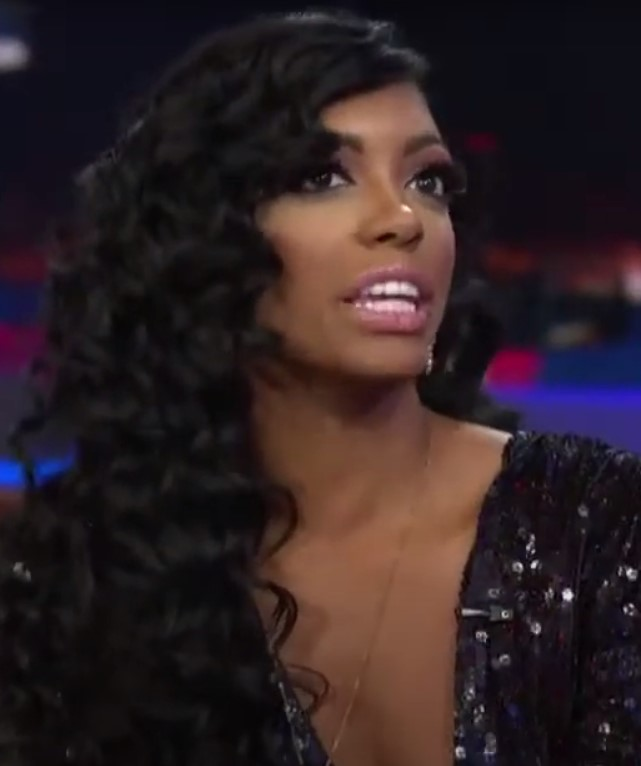
Porsha Williams

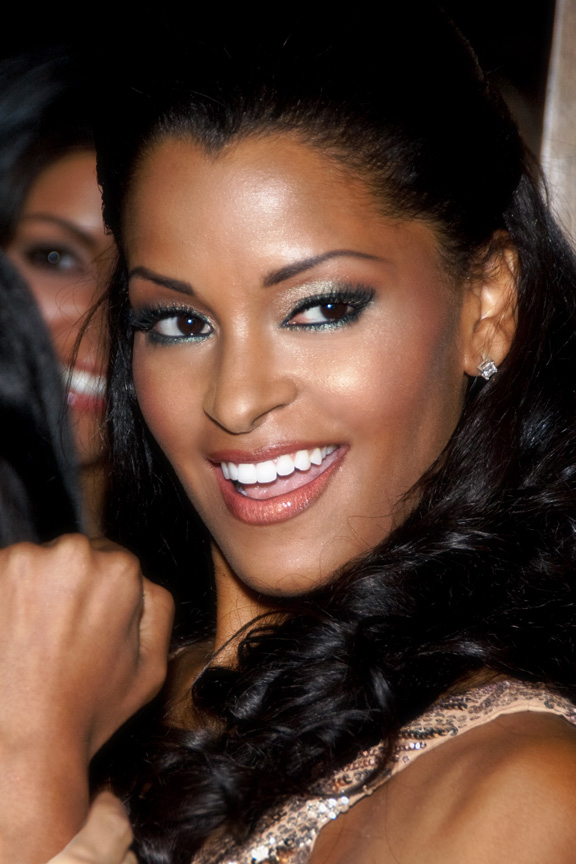
Claudia Jordan

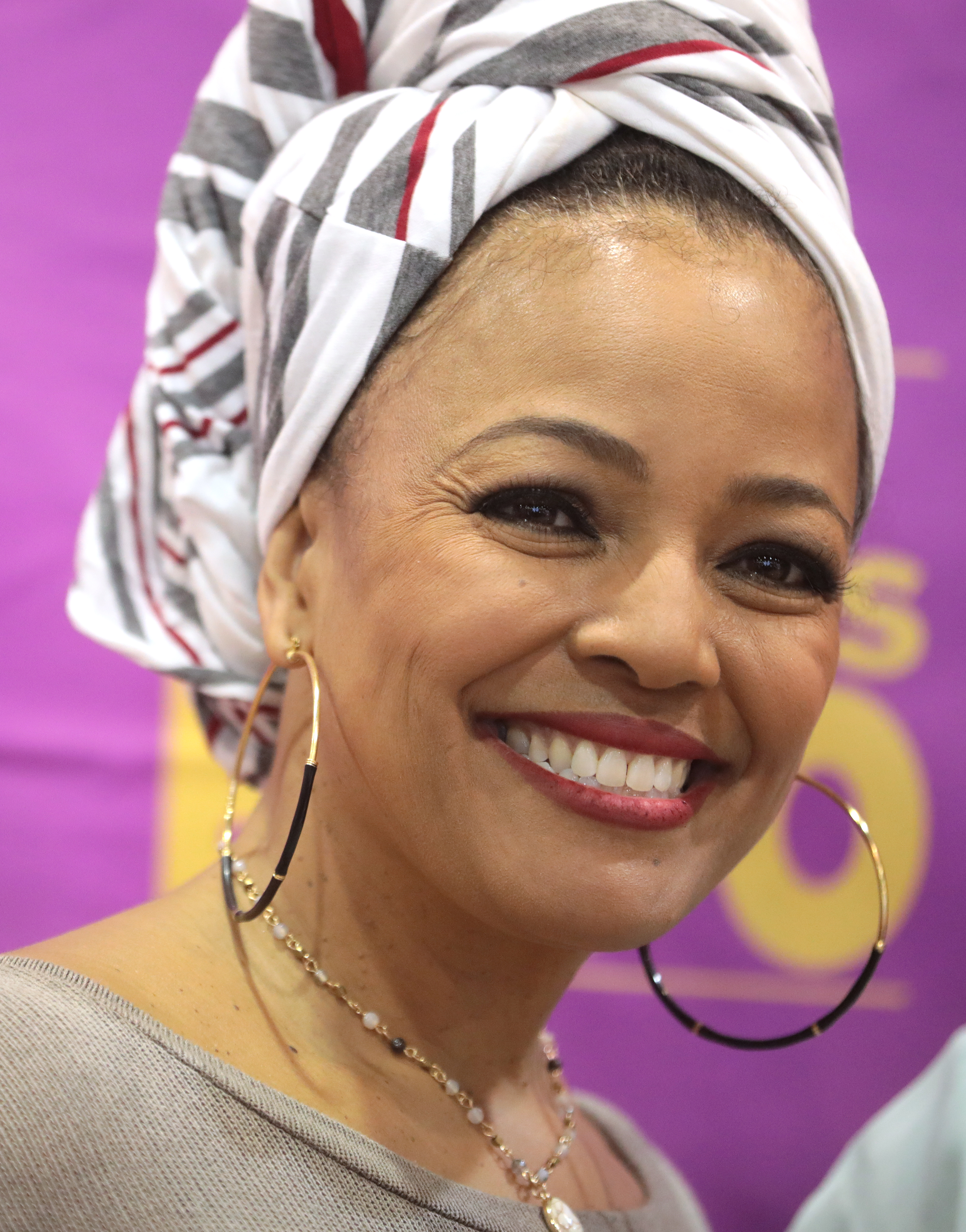
Kim Fields

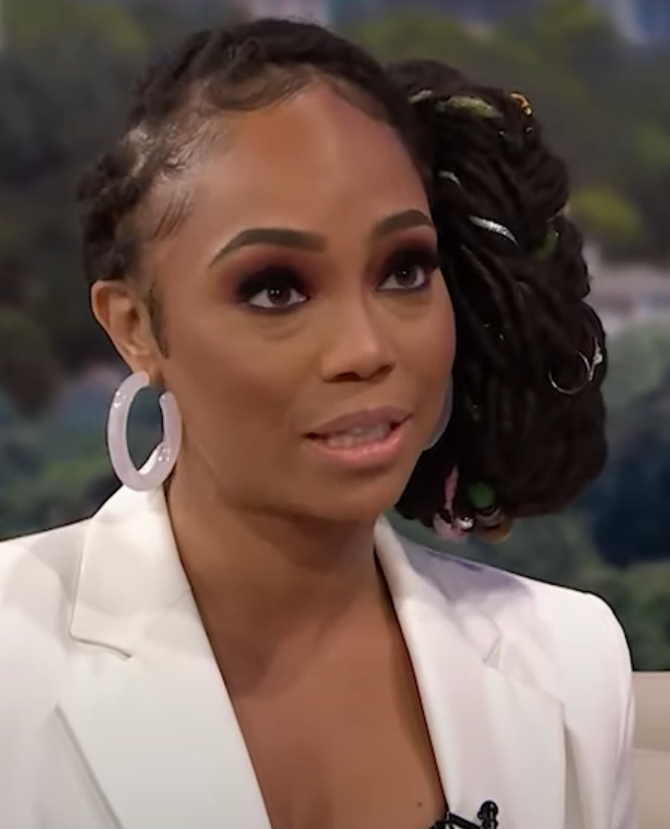
Shamari DeVoe

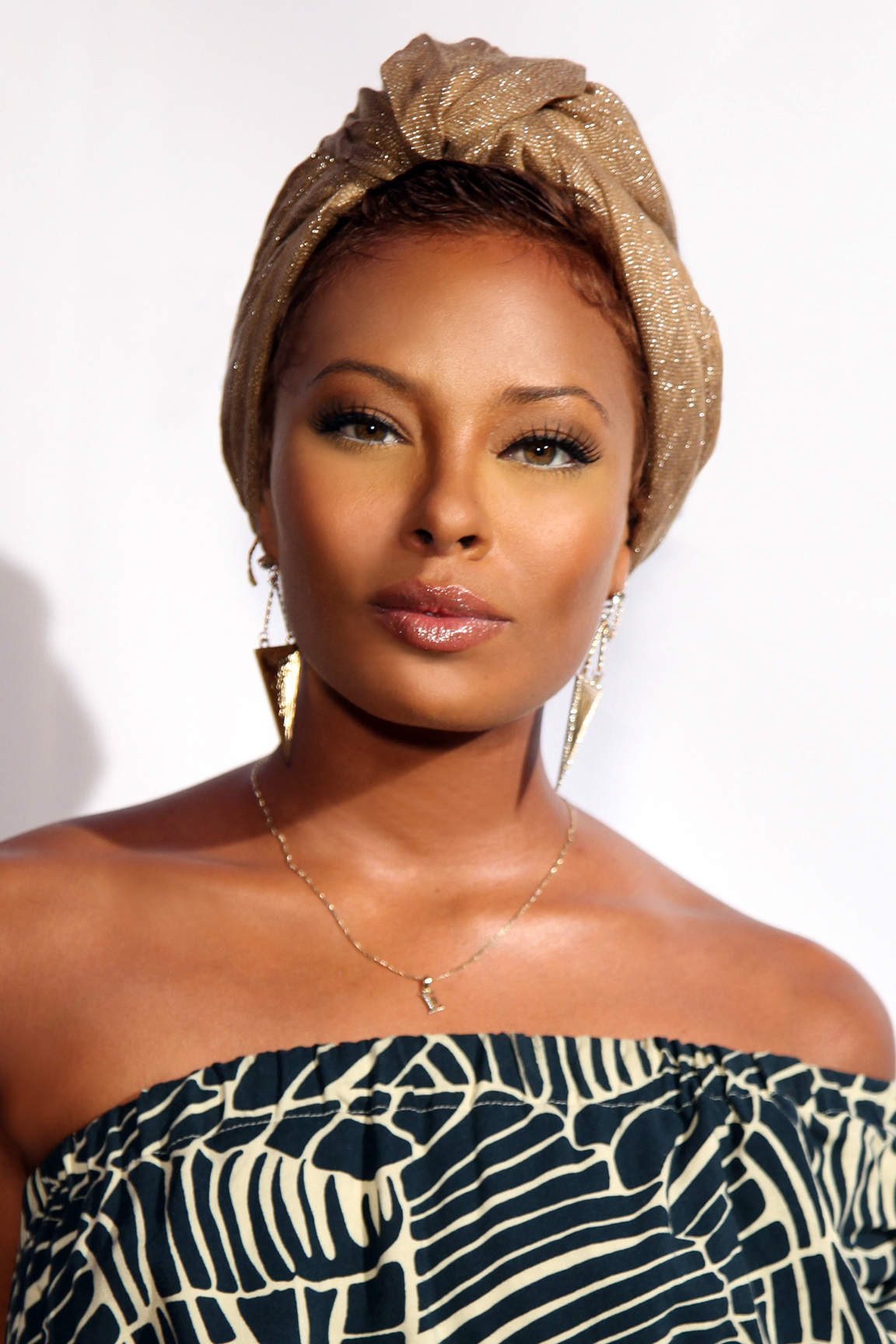
Eva Marcille

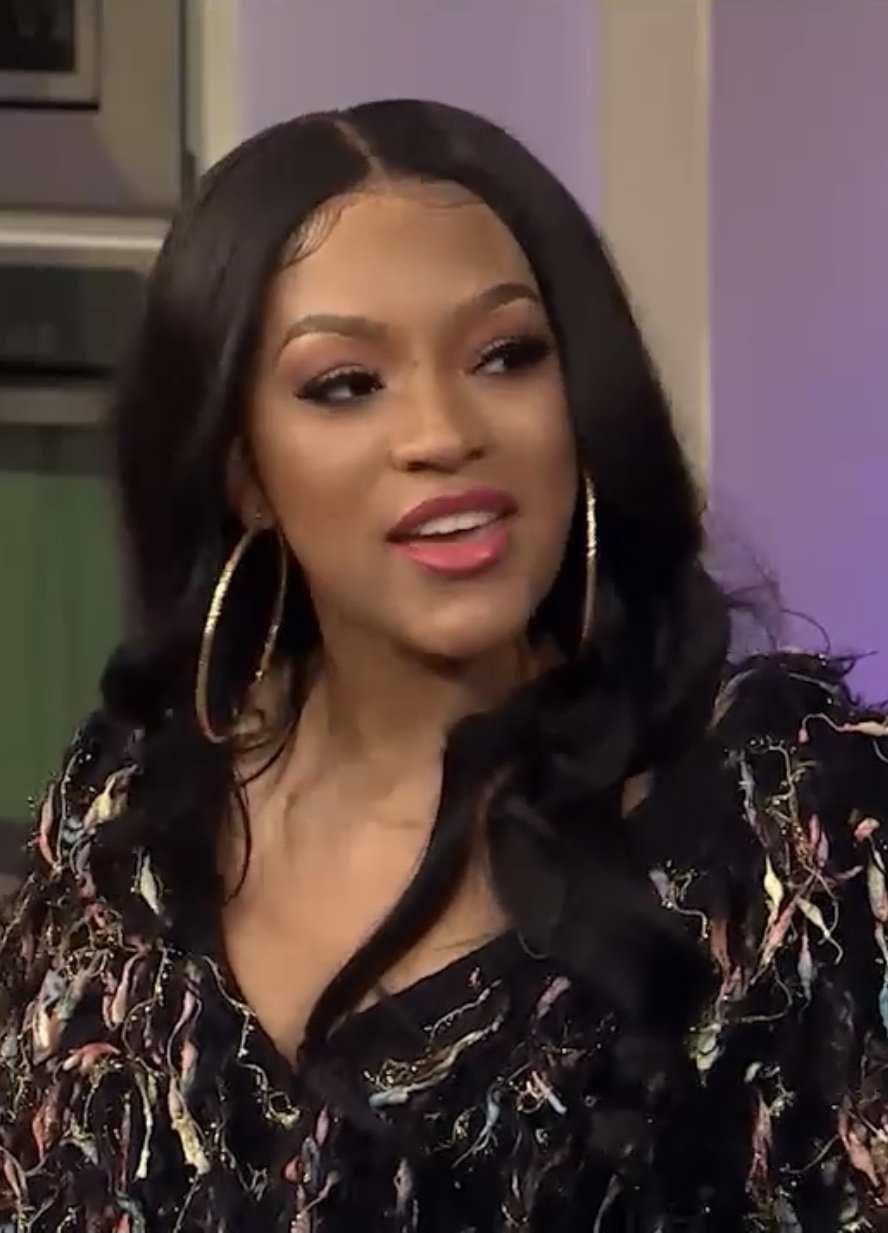
Drew Sidora

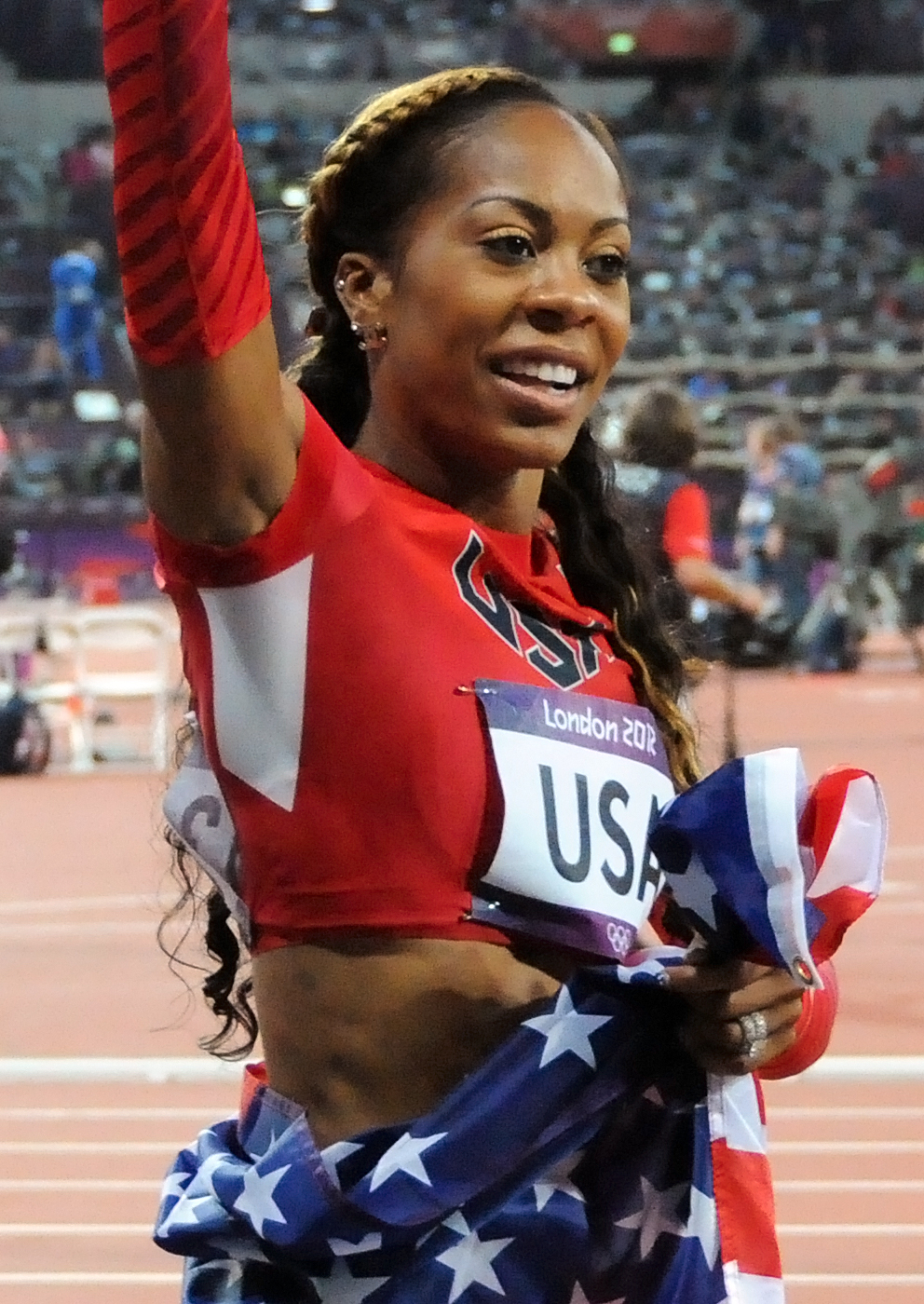
Sanya Richards-Ross

Main cast members
| Cast member | Seasons | | | | | | | | | | | | | | | | |
| Cast member | 1 | 2 | 3 | 4 | 5 | 6 | 7 | 8 | 9 | 10 | 11 | 12 | 13 | 14 | 15 | 16 | 17 |
|---|---|---|---|---|---|---|---|---|---|---|---|---|---|---|---|---|---|
| NeNe Leakes | Main | Main | Main | Main | Main | Main | Main | Guest | | Main | Main | Main | | | | | |
| DeShawn Snow | Main | | | | | | | | | | | | | Guest | Guest | | |
| Shereé Whitfield | Main | Main | Main | Main | | | | Friend | Main | Main | | | Guest | Main | Main | | |
| Lisa Wu | Main | Main | Guest | | | | | | Guest | Guest | | | | Guest | Guest | | |
| Kim Zolciak | Main | Main | Main | Main | Main | | | | Guest | Friend | | | | | Guest | | |
| Kandi Burruss | | Main | Main | Main | Main | Main | Main | Main | Main | Main | Main | Main | Main | Main | Main | | |
| Cynthia Bailey | | | Main | Main | Main | Main | Main | Main | Main | Main | Main | Main | Main | | Guest | Friend | Friend |
| Phaedra Parks | | | Main | Main | Main | Main | Main | Main | Main | | | | | | | Main | Main |
| Kenya Moore | | | | | Main | Main | Main | Main | Main | Main | Guest | Main | Main | Main | Main | Guest | |
| Porsha Williams | | | | | Main | Main | Friend | Main | Main | Main | Main | Main | Main | | | Main | Main |
| Claudia Jordan | | | | | | | Main | Guest | | | | | Guest | | | | Guest |
| Kim Fields | | | | | | | | Main | | | | | | | | | |
| Eva Marcille | | | | | | | | | | Friend | Main | Main | Guest | | | | |
| Shamari DeVoe | | | | | | | | | | | Main | | | | | Guest | |
| Drew Sidora | | | | | | | | | | | | | Main | Main | Main | Main | Main |
| Marlo Hampton | | | | Friend | | Guest | | Guest | Guest | Friend | Friend | Friend | Friend | Main | Main | | |
| Sanya Richards-Ross | | | | | | | | | | | | | | Main | Main | | |
| Brit Eady | | | | | | | | | | | | | | | | Main | |
| Shamea Morton Mwangi | | | | | Guest | Guest | Guest | Friend | Guest | Guest | Guest | Guest | Guest | | Guest | Main | Main |
| Angela Oakley | | | | | | | | | | | | | | | | Main | Main |
| Kelli Potter | | | | | | | | | | | | | | | | Main | Main |
| Pinky Cole | | | | | | | | | | | | | | | | | Main |
| K. Michelle | | | | | | | | | | | | | | | | | Main |
Friends of the housewives
| Demetria McKinney | | | | | | | Friend | Guest | | | | | | | | | |
| Tanya Sam | | | | | | | | | | | Friend | Friend | Friend | | | | |
| LaToya Ali | | | | | | | | | | | | | Friend | | Guest | | |
| Monyetta Shaw-Carter | | | | | | | | | | | | | | Friend | Friend | Guest | |
| Courtney Rhodes | | | | | | | | | | | | | | | Friend | | |

== Episodes ==
The Real Housewives of Atlanta episodes
| Season | Episodes | Originally released | | Average Viewers |
| Season | Episodes | First released | Last released | Average Viewers |
|---|---|---|---|---|
| 1 | 8 | October 7, 2008 | November 25, 2008 | 1.52 |
| 2 | 16 | July 30, 2009 | November 12, 2009 | 2.71 |
| 3 | 18 | October 4, 2010 | February 20, 2011 | 2.86 |
| 4 | 24 | November 6, 2011 | April 22, 2012 | 2.85 |
| 5 | 24 | November 4, 2012 | April 28, 2013 | 3.10 |
| 6 | 27 | November 3, 2013 | May 18, 2014 | 3.73 |
| 7 | 25 | November 9, 2014 | May 10, 2015 | 3.08 |
| 8 | 21 | November 8, 2015 | April 10, 2016 | 2.85 |
| 9 | 25 | November 6, 2016 | May 14, 2017 | 2.62 |
| 10 | 22 | November 5, 2017 | April 29, 2018 | 2.20 |
| 11 | 23 | November 4, 2018 | May 12, 2019 | 1.96 |
| 12 | 26 | November 3, 2019 | May 24, 2020 | 1.79 |
| 13 | 21 | December 6, 2020 | May 9, 2021 | 1.25 |
| 14 | 20 | May 1, 2022 | September 25, 2022 | 0.95 |
| 15 | 18 | May 7, 2023 | September 10, 2023 | 0.87 |
| 16 | 20 | March 9, 2025 | July 27, 2025 | 0.58 |
| 17 | 20 | April 5, 2026 | August 23, 2026 | 0.69 |

== Storylines ==
In its series premiere, The Real Housewives of Atlanta introduced Wu-Hartwell, Snow, Leakes, Zolciak and Whitfield. Leakes and Whitfield were in the midst of a personal conflict, which escalated after Leakes was excluded from Whitfield's birthday party. Meanwhile, Zolciak was revealed to be dating a publicly unknown boyfriend nicknamed "Big Papa", and later decided to pursue her aspirations of becoming a country music singer. Her friendship with Leakes deteriorated after she established a companionship with Whitfield, and was ended after Leakes made sarcastic remarks about Zolciak's music career. Snow and Wu-Hartwell additionally looked to establish prominence as a socialite and a jewelry designer, respectively. Whitfield attempted to launch her own fashion line and organize a lunch for the women to reconcile, although both ventures proved unsuccessful in the finale of the first season.

The second season saw the exit of Snow and the introduction of Burruss, who had recently become engaged to her boyfriend A.J. and expressed interest in reviving her music career. An attempted reconciliation between Leakes, Whitfield, and Zolciak failed to come to fruition, with Whitfield notably tugging on Zolciak's wig to "shift it a little bit". Meanwhile, a feud developed between Leakes and Burruss after the latter became friends with Zolciak and helped her record her single "Tardy for the Party". Meanwhile, Zolciak attempted to launch her own wig line and became engaged to Big Poppa, while Wu-Hartwell and Whitfield launched their own clothing collections.

The third season saw the exit of Wu as a Housewife, and the introduction of Bailey and Parks, while Leakes and Zolciak reconciled as the former contemplated divorcing her husband Gregg and the latter began a lesbian relationship. Parks, who was in the middle of her pregnancy, clashed with her husband Apollo Nida over their differing opinions on parenting; she gave birth later in the season. Meanwhile, Zolciak and Burruss continued recording music together, although they clashed over their creative differences. Bailey later became engaged to her boyfriend Peter Thomas, while Zolciak set her affections on football player Kroy Biermann; a conflict between Burruss, Leakes, and Zolciak later ensued while the latter two women embark on a promotional concert tour. Against the advice of her mother and sister, Bailey married Thomas in the third-season finale.

The fourth season begins with Hampton being introduced as a 'friend of the housewives', as Zolciak was in the middle of her first pregnancy by her boyfriend Biermann; she later gave birth to their son. Leakes continued divorce proceedings with Gregg, while Whitfield found herself in financial difficulties after her ex-husband failed to pay child support. Meanwhile, Bailey opened her own modeling agency, while Parks looked to launch a family-operated funeral home. Leakes's new friendship with Hampton caused tension between all of the women, which escalated during a group vacation in South Africa; while Zolciak, who had remained home with her children, became upset by negative comments Bailey (not Burruss) made about her during the group vacation. As the season closed, Leakes began to reconsider her divorce from Gregg.

The fifth season saw Whitfield exit as a Housewife for the first time and introduced former Miss USA Moore and football player Kordell Stewart's wife Williams, Leakes reconciled with Gregg and pondered the possibility of remarrying him. Zolciak was forced to move out of her mansion, which she and Biermann had attempted to purchase less than a year earlier, Leakes began to question Moore's seemingly unfaithful behavior towards her boyfriend Walter during a group trip to Anguilla, which began a feud between Leakes and Williams against Moore. Moore wished to marry Walter although their relationship had begun to deteriorate, while Parks and Moore created competing workout DVDs after plans to make the project a joint venture proved unsuccessful. Toward the end of the season, Williams attempted to revive her failing marriage to Stewart with therapist sessions.

The sixth season saw the first exit of Zolciak. Williams realized her marriage to Stewart was not salvageable as the season commenced, while Leakes became upset with Moore after the latter went against "girl code" by inappropriately communicating with Nida. Moore moved out of her rental property after being evicted, while Leakes returned to Atlanta full-time after her television series The New Normal was canceled. Burruss struggled to manage the conflict between her estranged mother Joyce and her longtime boyfriend Todd Tucker, although they attempted to reconcile as the couple became engaged and began planning their nuptials. In a later attempt to salvage the relationships between the women, Leakes hosted a couples pajama party for their group, although the women continued to clash with one another; a later spa gathering failed to resolve residual tension between Leakes and Moore. Meanwhile, Williams attempted to launch her career as an actress after being cast in Burruss's musical. After two seasons of feuding between Williams and Moore, a verbal war ensues at the reunion. It leads to Williams pulling Moore's hair and dragging her across the floor. She was charged with assault.

The seventh season sees Williams demoted to a 'friend of' role, replaced by Jordan, introduced as a friend of Moore's, where the latter helps Jordan adjust to Atlanta life. Jordan and Williams struggle to bond despite working for the same radio company. Parks' husband Nida is charged with bank fraud and identity theft, and in turn, was sentenced to 8 years of prison time. After Nida's behavior became increasingly erratic prior to his conviction, Parks sought refuge in other accommodation. Nida, in retaliation, alleges in conversation with Bailey's husband Thomas that Parks has been having an affair. Bailey brings this rumor to light at a group dinner, orchestrating chaos between Moore and Parks. Parks grows upset about Burruss' lack of defence of her, finding solace with Williams and Leakes. The cast becomes increasingly divided, with one alliance forming between Parks, Williams, and Leakes, and another between Moore, Jordan, and Bailey, while Burruss remains neutral. Leakes makes her Broadway debut as Madame in Rodgers & Hammerstein's Cinderella, and has come to blows with most members of the group. Leakes bows out of a group trip to Manila, where Parks and Moore reconcile after a years-long feud.

The eighth season sees Williams return to her original capacity as a Housewife, alongside new addition Fields. Leakes is demoted to an extended guest capacity, Jordan does not return, and Whitfield returns as a 'friend'. A video of Bailey's husband Thomas allegedly being unfaithful circulates, leading to a confrontation by Moore to Thomas at Bailey's eyewear line launch party. Moore also clashes with street neighbour Whitfield regarding the construction of both homes. Moore reaches out to Fields' production company regarding her television show pilot. However, Moore begins to increasingly grow more irritated of Fields' condescending behaviour towards her and it falls through. Williams' anger comes into question throughout the season, such as her involvement in a physical altercation with Bailey on a group yacht trip. The group fly to Miami bringing along friend of Cynthia, Tammy McCall-Browning. McCall-Browning's nephew fights with Moore as she feels threatened by him and knocks unconscious aunt McCall-Browning. Bailey chooses Fields' company over Moore's to produce a commercial for her eyewear line in Jamaica. The group head to Jamaica, joined by NeNe and Gregg Leakes, to holiday and shoot the commercial. Parks, a newly single mother following her husbands' arrest, and Burruss' friendship begins to decline.

The ninth season sees Fields and Leakes depart the show, the latter for the first time. Whitfield returns as a full-time housewife, while Zolciak-Biermann and Hampton return in a guest capacity. Parks spends the season coping with her divorce from Nida. She has ended her friendship with Burruss and forms a close friendship with Williams (who together are deemed "Frick and Frack"). Williams claims she has a source that says Burruss and Tucker conspired to rape her using drugs; this accusation leads to a feud between them, as well as tensions within the group due to its severity. Bailey's marriage to Thomas unravels, and she too begins divorce proceedings with some guilt. Moore beings dating Matt Jordan, but the relationship turns abusive, and she has difficulty in breaking up with him. She and Whitfield also complete construction on their homes, continuing to clash over their decorations. Moore upsets Whitfield by going with Burruss into her home's unfinished basement, which begins a feud with Zolciak-Biermann after the latter makes disparaging remarks about Moore. Whitfield coins herself as "the bone collector". In the final reunion episodes, Williams reveals that she learned about the claim from Parks, who had seemingly created the claim vindictively against Burruss.

The tenth season sees the firing of Parks over fabricating the rape accusation and other aspects of her storyline. Leakes returns as a full-time housewife, while Zolciak-Biermann returns as a 'friend' through Whitfield. Hampton and Eva Marcille join as 'friends' through their connections to Leakes. Williams attempts to reconcile with the women over her role in Parks' smear campaign against Burruss throughout the season. While on the group vacation in Barcelona, a fight between her and Hampton results in her going back home early. Leakes nurses her husband through health issues while revitalizing her acting career by doing stand-up. Burruss launches a restaurant with her relatives and prepares to launch a reunion tour for her former girl group Xscape. Burruss invites Leakes to open for the group on the tour but is forced to drop her after a confrontation between Leakes and a heckler creates controversy. Bailey begins to date following her divorce from Thomas but finds conflict with Marcille when she accuses her new beau of cheating on his girlfriend with Bailey. Moore returns married to New York entrepreneur Mark Daly, the legality of which is met with skepticism from Zolciak-Biermann and Hampton. She finds her marriage under pressure due to their long-distance relationship and his reluctance to be in the public eye. Whitfield alienates the other women due to her friendship with Zolciak-Biermann, whose feuds with the other women draw accusations of racism.

The eleventh season saw the return of most of the cast members with the exception of Moore and Whitfield. Shamari DeVoe, wife of R&B legend and member of New Edition, Ronnie DeVoe was introduced as a full-time cast member along with fashion model Eva Marcille, who was featured last season as a friend. Marlo Hampton returned as a friend of the housewives along with Tanya Sam. This season, Williams finds love in her new boyfriend Dennis McKinley. The ladies are skeptical of McKinley because of his reputation in Atlanta, more specifically Burruss who tried to warn Williams about him. Williams then reveals that she is expecting her first child with McKinley and begins to clash with Burruss. DeVoe gets a warm reception from most of the ladies except Hampton who made several comments about DeVoe's marriage and children. Bailey is navigating a new love interest in Mike Hill while also preparing college bound Noelle for her departure to Howard University. Marcille prepares for her wedding while also juggling her living situation as she seeks for her family's safety when she gets surprising news about her daughter's father's whereabouts. Marcille also clashes with Hampton after she reveals that Marcille's bridesmaids were leaking information about her lifestyle and her finances. Burruss and husband Todd celebrate the opening of their new restaurant while also promoting their live show “Welcome to the Dungeon”, which was inspired by allegations made about Burruss-Tucker and Williams in season nine. Burruss has also revealed her plans on expanding her family and even considering surrogacy. Leakes is dealing with the struggles of being a caretaker to her husband Gregg, who is battling cancer. The ladies rally around the Leakes family as cracks also begin to show in Nene and Gregg's marriage. Leakes begins to question her relationships with the ladies after the Bye Wig party that erupted in chaos after Burruss and Williams went into Leakes closet without her permission. Moore's surprises the ladies at Bailey's event in the season finale and reveals her own pregnancy with husband Marc Daly, which upsets Leakes who feels betrayed by Bailey. The season reunion episodes showcased the ladies accusing Hampton of being a serial instigator and Leakes divides her friendship with the ladies.

The twelfth season saw the departure of DeVoe and the return of Moore as a full-time housewife. Sam and Hampton return as friends of the housewives. Moore and Williams share a bonding experience as new mothers, which simmers down their longtime tumultuous relationship. Burruss focuses on acting while awaiting the arrival of her baby girl after she and Tucker decided to go through the surrogacy process and clashing over differing parenting methods. Bailey is eagerly waiting for her boyfriend Mike Hill to pop the question and attempts to rebuild her relationship with Leakes after not speaking since the season eleven reunion. Moore struggles with being a new mother while also noticing cracks in her marriage. Growing pains in her relationship with husband Daly eventually come to a head after the charity event, which leads to Moore filing for divorce before the ladies trip to Greece. Williams deals with being a new mother to her baby girl PJ with McKinley. As rumors surface of McKinley's infidelity, Williams calls off the engagement and breaks up with him after it was revealed that he was being unfaithful even during Williams’ pregnancy. Marcille enjoys married life and settles into her new home with her husband Michael Sterling and is now moving forward with steps of changing her daughter's last name to Sterling. Marcille gives birth to her second child with Sterling. Sam and Moore have feud when a woman who is dubbed the “Cookie Lady” brings information about Sam's fiancé being unfaithful. Leakes tries to reconcile with the ladies with moderate success. The ladies also deal with a rumor spread by Leakes that someone secretly recorded Bailey talking badly about her which then leads the ladies to confronting Momplaisir and Hampton who are believed to know who the “snake” is. A tense confrontation amongst the group leads to a near violent encounter when they address “Snakegate” on the Toronto trip. While Burruss and Tucker prep for their baby shower for the arrival of their new baby girl, new tensions reignite Tucker's feud with his mother-in-law, leading to her absence at the party. Moore and Leakes growing feud reaches a point of no return. The season twelve reunion episodes were produced using remote techniques in the wake of the pandemic, so the ladies were home and on Zoom. Moore and Williams discuss newfound issues and the ladies get candid about “Snakegate” which leads to Leakes closing her computer and not continuing the show with the rest of the cast.

== Reception ==
=== Critical response ===
The Real Housewives of Atlanta has been moderately well received by critics. Writing for Common Sense Media, Melissa Camacho spoke favorably of the series' emphasis on "a successful and powerful segment of the African-American community" that appears to be frequently neglected by the popular television. Tim Hall from the Seattle Post-Intelligencer commented of his general distaste for reality television, particularly describing The Real Housewives of Orange County as "utterly ridiculous". However, he admitted that the dynamic and conflict between the women, in addition to the wealthy lifestyles they led, to be "somewhat entertaining". In a more mixed review, Alessandra Stanley from The New York Times joked that its portrayal of wealth served as "the best choice for a time capsule of the Bling Decade" when noting the economic downturn the United States experienced around the time that the series premiered, although more seriously stated that the housewives' luxuries "was never all that enviable, and now it looks as if it might not be viable." Hanh Nguyen from Zap2It shared a similar sentiment, criticizing that the "showy elite and rampant consumerism" that the women regularly display "seems rather out of touch" given the United States' economic hardship, although she elaborated that the program "[is] not by any means boring, but you do have to be in the mood to watch."

The Real Housewives of Atlanta has been recognized as a "guilty pleasure" by several media outlets. Writing for About.com, Latoya West commented that the "self-absorbed" nature of the housewives may become irritating to viewers, but noted that the series' "divalicious drama might be addictive." In 2009, a writer from Essence mentioned that they "couldn't get enough of the ladies" from the program, and recognized it as the best reality show of the year. Writing for Today, Leslie Bruce commented that The Real Housewives franchise in general rose to prominence for its depiction of "foul-mouthed, often catfighting and always self-promoting" women, and stated that they "dominate water-cooler discussions [...] by showcasing at times the worst of female behavior."

In December 2013, Williams received additional criticism for comments made in an episode aired during the sixth season, where she indicated that she believed the Underground Railroad was an actual railroad line.

=== American television ratings ===
The Real Housewives of Atlanta is the most popular of the Real Housewives franchise. In 2016, a study from The New York Times of the 50 television shows with the most Facebook Likes found that it was "most popular in the Black Belt, but maintains fairly consistent popularity everywhere" in the US.

The first season maintained an average of 1.495 million weekly viewers; Bravo announced that the series had become the first program from the network to "crack the two million viewer mark among adults 18–49." The premiere episode of the second season was watched by 2.66 million people, setting the record for the highest-rated The Real Housewives premiere episode in the franchise's history at the time. The third season averaged a weekly viewership of 3.6 million people, while the fourth and fifth seasons premiered with 2.8 million and 3.2 million viewers, respectively. The sixth-season premiere was watched by 3.1 million people; with 1.9 million viewers being classified in the adults 25–54 demographic, it became the highest-rated episode in this target demographic. As of February 2014, The Real Housewives of Atlanta is the highest-rated installment of The Real Housewives franchise, and is additionally the most-watched series airing on Bravo. The premiere episode of the seventh season attracted over 3.8 million viewers during its initial broadcast on November 9, 2014, including 2.2 million viewers in the 18–49 demographic via Nielsen ratings. It marked as the most watched season premiere ever to air on Bravo. However, viewership has dropped to an all-time low, averaging 1.2 million viewers weekly throughout its 13th season.

== Broadcast history ==
The Real Housewives of Atlanta airs regularly on Bravo in the United States; most episodes are approximately one hour in length, and are broadcast in standard definition and high definition. Since its premiere, the series has alternated airing on Monday, Tuesday, Thursday, and Sunday evenings and has been frequently shifted between the 8:00, 9:00, and 10:00 PM timeslots.
