= LaToya Forever =

Canadian YouTube personality

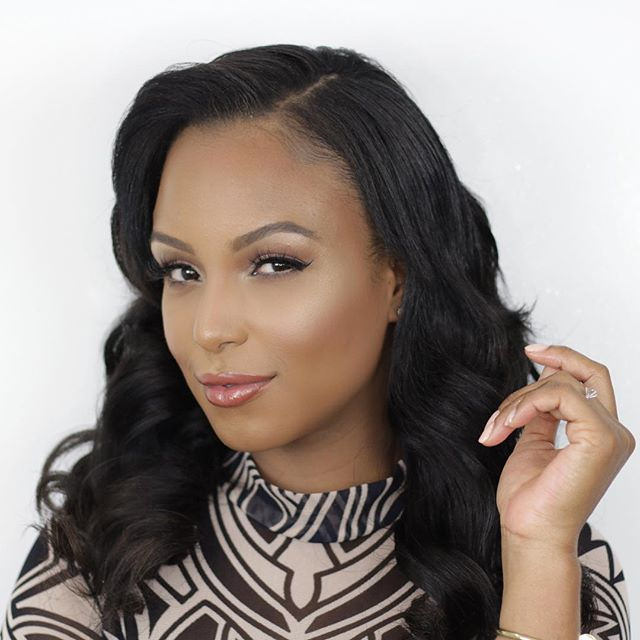
- LaToya Forever in 2016
- Born: LaToya Howard; February 7, 1987 (age 39); Scarborough, Ontario, Canada
- Other names: LaToya Forever; LaToya Ali
- Spouse: Adam Ali (m. 2014; div. 2020)
- Children: 4

YouTube information
- Channels: LaToya Forever; Sam and the Fam
- Years active: 2010–present
- Genres: Comedy; entertainment; vlogging
- Subscribers: 1.56 million (LaToya Forever); 802 thousand (Sam and the Fam)
- Views: 56.6 million (LaToya Forever); 905 thousand (Sam and the Fam)
- Last updated: June 19, 2026
- Website: latoyaforever.com

LaToya Howard, better known under the name LaToya Forever, is a Canadian YouTube personality and author, best known for her eponymous YouTube channel as well as her video blog channel "LaToya's Life". In 2012, she was the official Vibe TV host at the American Music Awards and in 2015 and 2017 she participated in the Buffer Festival. She published an autobiography in 2016.

== Early life ==
LaToya Howard was born in the Toronto suburb of Scarborough, daughter of professional baseball player Nigel Wilson and Debbie Howard, both of Trinidadian descent. Howard has seven younger siblings. Around the time, LaToya was 11–14 years old (middle school age) her family moved to the United States to allow her mother to get a college education. While living in the United States, Howard's family would often have to move from place to place, making it difficult to develop any strong friendships while she was growing up. Instead, she turned to creating videos and posting them online as an outlet for her feelings. She would later relocate to Toronto, Ontario.

== Online career ==
Howard first started posting videos in 2009 and in 2010 she began her YouTube channel "LaToya Forever", posting comedy skits and jokes to entertain herself and others. One of her most well-known early videos was titled "Shit Trini Moms Say", reflecting on her own mother growing up as well as other mothers from Trinidad. While pregnant with her first child, Samia, she began a video blog, or Vlog of her day creating the channel "LaToya's Life", with "reality show" type content about her and her life. In 2012, she was hired to be the Vibe TV host at the American Music Awards. In 2015, she introduced the "LaToya Forever App" to give her fans access to her video content.

YouTube made LaToya Forever their official YouTube Correspondent for the 2015 "YouTube FanFest Live" event that was held on May 2, 2015. In June 2016, she partnered with Gone Viral TV (GVTV) for a social media seminar. She was one of the featured guests at the 7th annual VidCon conference in Anaheim, California. In August 2015, Howard and her team were one of three teams selected for the Canadian Film Centre and Canadian Broadcast Corporation's "Jumping Screens" Comedy workshop, a workshop intended to help the creators make the jump from online to television. The workshop ran from June through November. Howard was one of the featured creators of the 2015 Buffer Festival, held from October 13 to 15, 2015, in Toronto.

She was named in 2016 VidCon's list of Best and Brightest Black YouTubers. LaToya Howard was invited to the YouTube's Room 301 series by Dwayne "The Rock" Johnson for a séance event. In October 2016, she launched a mobile game titled Save Samia in which players try deliver her daughter Samia to school on time. Latoya Howard's daughter, Samia Ali, also creates YouTube video reviews.

LaToya Howard appeared on Season 13 of The Real Housewives of Atlanta, as a "Friend of the Housewives". Outside of her video work, she produced an e-book titled How to become a YouTube Sensation and has written an autobiography titled LaToya's Life: Uncut Mishaps of a YouTube star, published on November 8, 2016.

== Bibliography ==
- Ali, LaToya (November 8, 2016). LaToya's Life: Uncut Mishaps of a YouTube Star. Mango. ISBN 978-1-63353-419-3.

== See also ==
- List of YouTubers
