= Drew Sidora =

American actress and singer

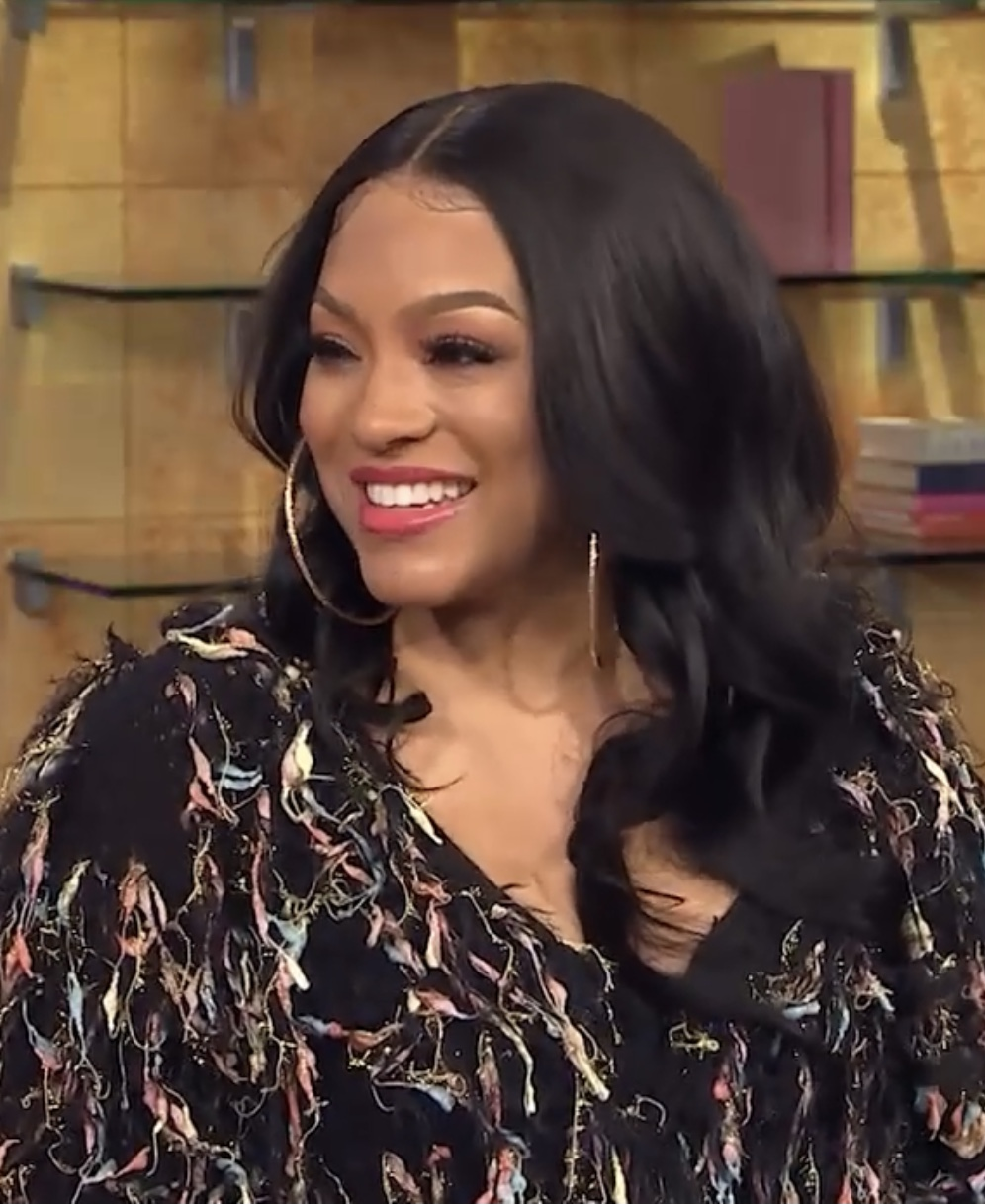
- Sidora in 2020
- Born: Drew Sidora Jordan; May 1, 1985 (age 41); Chicago, Illinois, U.S.
- Other name: Drew Pittman
- Occupations: Singer; actress; TV personality
- Years active: 1995–present
- Spouse: Ralph Pittman (m. 2014; div. 2026)
- Children: 3

Drew Sidora Jordan (born May 1, 1985) is an American actress, singer and TV personality. She is known for her recurring role as Chantel in the Disney Channel Original Series That's So Raven, her portrayal of Tionne Watkins in the VH1 TLC biographical film CrazySexyCool: The TLC Story, and playing a fictionalized version of herself in the BET comedy-drama television series The Game. She also appeared in the films White Chicks (2004) and Step Up (2006). Sidora joined the cast of the Bravo reality show The Real Housewives of Atlanta in 2020.

== Career ==
=== Acting ===
Sidora completed numerous industrial films and was the youngest member of the "Hook Players Theater Ensemble" in Hollywood, California, with residence at the Richard Pryor Theater. At age 9, she appeared in the Fox TV movie Divas, acting alongside Khalil Kain, Lisa Nicole Carson and Nicole Ari Parker. In August 2026, Drew Sidora signed with CGEM Talent for Management Representation.

Besides her roles in That's So Raven, Step Up and Blessed & Cursed, Sidora has also guest starred in Girlfriends in 2006 as a High School Girl Group recruiter, as well as Without a Trace, The Game, and What I Like About You. She has also appeared in the feature films White Chicks and Never Die Alone, and made a cameo appearance in GLC's single "Honor Me".

In 2013, she was cast as a member Tionne Watkins of the girl group TLC in the group's biopic that aired on VH1. Sidora also starred as Genesis "Genny" Winters in the 2014 BounceTV original One Love.

=== Reality television ===
Sidora joined the cast of The Real Housewives of Atlanta beginning its thirteenth season. She made her debut in December 2020.

=== Music ===
In January 2006, Sidora first signed a record deal with J Records. Sidora featured on the Step Up (Original Soundtrack) with two songs entitled "For The Love" and "Til The Dawn" in 2006. In 2007, she featured on the Three Can Play That Game soundtrack with a song entitled "Three Can Play". In December 2008, Sidora signed a record deal with Slip-n-Slide Records. In 2010, the album's first single titled "Juke It" was released. She played Trey Songz's lover in the video for "Last Time" of the album Trey Day. She also appears in Yung Berg's "Sexy Lady" video as the girlfriend. She also danced in Sean Paul’s "Give It Up to Me" video.

On September 16, 2022, Sidora released a single entitled "Already Know". The accompanying music video was released on June 25, 2023.

In March 2025, Sidora released her debut album, I Did It to Me. Two singles preceded the album's release, the title track and "Love 4 a Min", the latter having two versions, one featuring American R&B singer Torica and another featuring Love & Hip Hop: Atlanta cast member and rapper Sierra Gates. The album was executive-produced by Sidora's The Real Housewives of Atlanta costar Porsha Williams' former partner, Dennis McKinley, and released under his label MusicXchange.

== Personal life ==
Sidora has a son, Josiah, from a previous relationship. Sidora married Ralph Pittman and together they have two children: a son, Machai, born in June 2015, and a daughter, Aniya, born in February 2018. On February 27, 2023, Sidora filed a petition to divorce Pittman.

Her father, Robert Andrew "Bob" Jordan, a prominent Chicago pediatrician, died on August 11, 2023, of Alzheimer's disease. He and her mother, Jeanette, married on July 29, 1962. Drew is one of their five children.

== Filmography ==
=== Film ===
Year	Title	Role	Notes
1995	Divas	Angela	TV movie
2004	Never Die Alone	Ella	
2004	White Chicks	Shaunice	
2006	Step Up	Lucy Avila	
2007	Wild Hogs	Haley Davis	
2007	Motives 2	Rene	Video
2007	Nurses	Becca Dimato	Short
2008	Jury Of Our Peers	Vanessa	
2008	Farmhouse	Rebecca	
2008	Swipe	Drew	Short
2009	Man of Her Dreams	Erica Gordon	
2009	Frankenhood	Tammy	
2009	Killing Of Wendy	Tyler	
2009	B-Girl	Righteous	
2010	Blessed & Cursed	Patrice	
2011	She's Still Not Our Sister	Cynthia Walker	TV movie
2013	Hope For Love	Clarice	
2013	CrazySexyCool: The TLC Story	Tionne "T-Boz" Watkins	
2014	Could This Be Love	Sandra	
2015	Skinned	Jolie Sister	
2015	Sister Code	Lavae	
2016	Chasing Waterfalls	Olivia	TV movie
2017	The Preacher's Son	Tanisha	
2018	The Choir Director	Tanisha	
2019	Just a Friend	Mia	
2020	Influence	Desiree Hudson	
2020	White People Money	Nora	
2022	Line Sisters	Dominique	TV movie
2023	The Pass	Nina	
2023	Boxed in 2	Detective Reid James	
2023	Women of the Jury	Michelle	
2023	God's Grace: The Sheila Johnson Story	Jasmine	
2024	The Despaired	CoCo	
2024	Vicious Murder	Riley Maywood	
2024	Adopted	Carrie	
2025	Run	Britney Sidora	
2025	A Demon's Revenge	Regina	
2026	Twin	Jordyn/Justinee	

=== Television ===
Year	Title	Role	Notes
2003	What I Like About You	Angela	Episode: "The Party"
2003	The O'Keefes	Nicole	Episode: "Football"
2004	Without a Trace	Thani Corey	Episode: "Exposure"
2004-05	That’s So Raven	Chantel	Recurring Cast: Season 3
2006	Girlfriends	Sage	Episode: "Oh, Hell Yes: The Seminar"
2007	The Game	Herself	Guest: Season 1, Recurring Cast: Season 2
2013	JD Lawrence's Community Service	Sky	Main Cast
2014	One Love	Genesis Winters	Main Cast
2015	Unsung Hollywood	Angela	Episode: "Vivica A. Fox"
2015	Hindsight	Paige Hill	Main Cast
2020–	The Real Housewives of Atlanta	Herself	Main Cast: Season 13–
2021	Porsha's Family Matters	Herself	Episode: "The Legendary Ms. Williams"
2022-23	Dish Nation	Herself/Guest Co-Host	Recurring Guest Co-Host: Season 10-11
2023	Celebrity Family Feud	Herself/Contestant	Episode: "Episode #10.6"
2024	My Real Life	Herself	Episode: "Drew Sidora"
2024–present	Mind Your Business	Aaliyah Williams	Main Cast

== Discography ==
- I did it to me (2025)
