= Slutty Vegan =

Restaurant chain in Atlanta, Georgia, US

- Logo

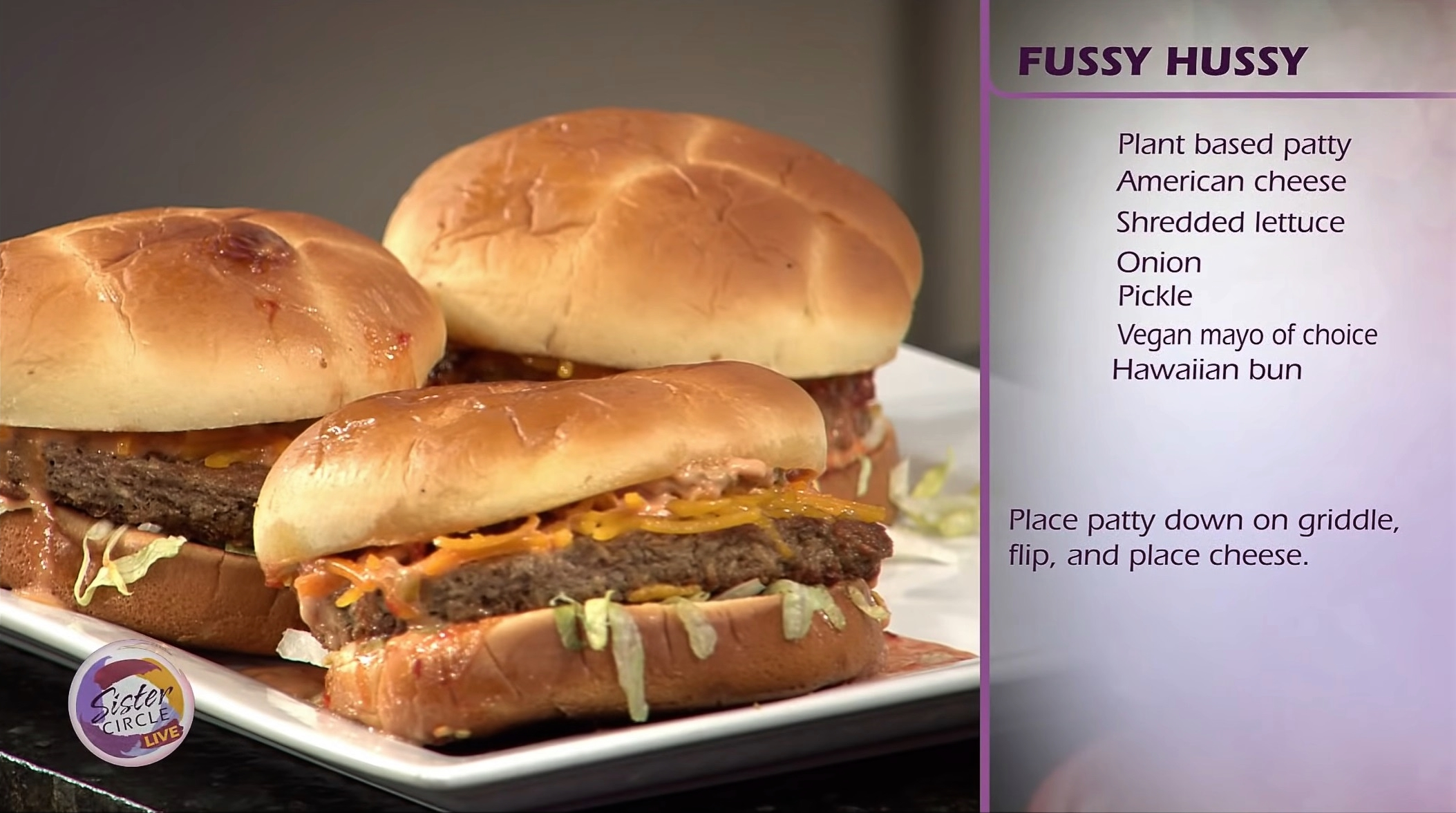
- Slutty Vegan restaurant Fussy Hussy burger demonstrated on Sister Circle in 2018
- Founded: August 2018; 8 years ago in Atlanta, Georgia
- Founder: Pinky Cole
- Headquarters: Atlanta, Georgia
- Website: sluttyveganatl.com

Slutty Vegan ATL, LLC, doing business as Slutty Vegan, is a vegan hamburger restaurant chain founded by Aisha "Pinky" Cole (born December 8, 1987) in August 2018, in Atlanta, Georgia. In 2023, she was added to the Time magazine 100 Next list, recognizing individuals with an outsized influence on American culture.

== History ==
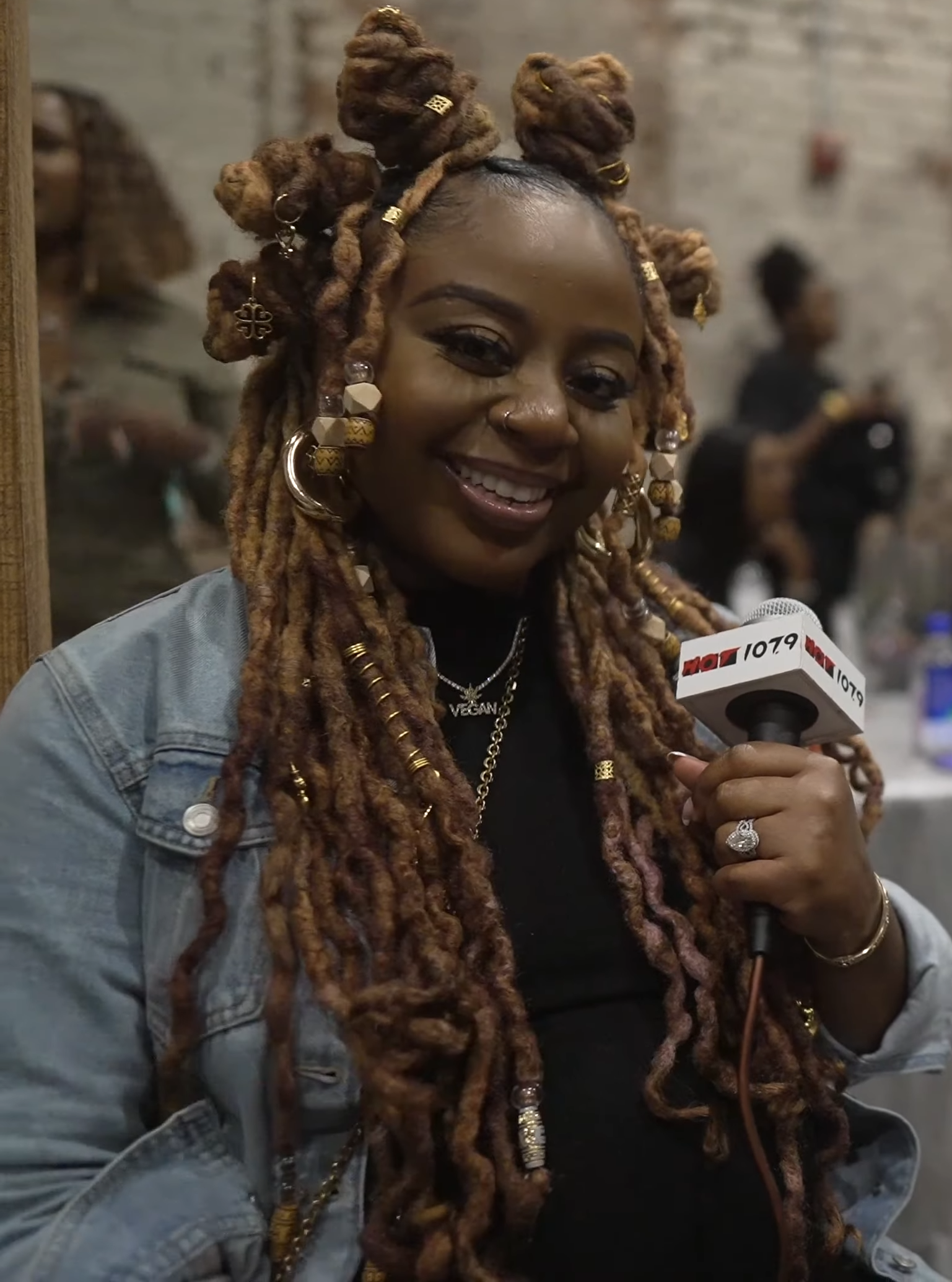
Pinky Cole at InvestFest in 2023

Pinky Cole, a former television producer, founded the restaurant in August 2018. She intended for it to be a ghost kitchen, where customers would order food online and use a delivery service to get it. Cole started the restaurant because she found that there was no place available to eat vegan food after 9 p.m. She decided to use sex as a theme for her restaurant because of its ability to attract non-vegan customers. Social media and word-of-mouth were used heavily to promote the restaurant. Pinky’s Jamaican and American Restaurant opened in 2014. It was Cole's first restaurant. It operated in Harlem for two years, until she shut it down in 2016 after a grease fire.

In July 2018, Cole sold her first vegan burgers through delivery apps and opened the Slutty Vegan food truck in September of that year. In January 2019, she opened the first Slutty Vegan brick-and-mortar restaurant in the Westview neighborhood of Atlanta. In 2023, Slutty Vegan had 11 locations in Georgia, New York City, Birmingham, Ala., and Dallas.

Cole was inspired to create the vegan restaurant Slutty Vegan due to her own cravings for vegan junk food. All of Slutty Vegan's products are titled with some form of sexual connotation, including "One Night Stand", "Fussy Hussy", "Sloppy Toppy", and "Chick'N Head".

It originally started in a shared kitchen, before moving to a food truck several weeks later, and later moved to a brick-and-mortar location in Westview on January 13, 2019. Two locations were opened in the Atlanta area in 2020. The restaurant is known for its growth despite the ongoing COVID-19 pandemic. The chain has collaborated with Shake Shack to release plant-based burgers that were available for only one day. The Slutty Vegan menu lists burgers, hot dogs, and chicken sandwiches. Menu items have suggestive names like Fussy Hussy and One Night Stand. Parade magazine has published the recipe for the Chik’N Head sandwich.

The restaurants have gone on to garner media attention and recognition. In 2023, Time Magazine named her to their 100NEXT List, noting her dedicated following of fans and the impact she has had on the image of vegan cuisine. In 2024, VegNews listed Cole as one of the "17 Black Vegan Chefs Redefining Plant-Based Food and Community".

Slutty Vegan has faced criticism for high prices and its aggressive approach to growth and expansion. In 2024, facing financial struggles Cole attributes to high levels of corporate debt, the company underwent a restructuring with her relinquishing ownership. She eventually bought back the company, promising to change how the company is run. Following the restructuring, Slutty Vegan now operates on a franchising model.

On March 2, 2026, Cole, along with her company, filed for Chapter 11 bankruptcy protection. The filing claimed that Cole owed nearly $1.2 million to the Small Business Administration, as well as nearly $200,000 in state taxes.

== Legal controversies ==
On November 11, 2022, Pinky Cole was named alongside three others in a lawsuit filed by an ex-employee of Bar Vegan against the restaurant. The employee alleged that the restaurant was withholding wages from her in violation of the Fair Labor Standards Act. The case was eventually settled, but according to the plaintiff's lawyers (as of April 2025), Cole failed to pay the amount agreed to in the settlement.

Slutty Vegan has also been sued by Asana Partners LLC for an amount totaling over $87,000 in unpaid rent, late fees, and interest. Asana Partners LLC owns the properties in Atlanta which host both Slutty Vegan and Cole's The Morning After restaurant. As of January 2023 there is a pending lawsuit over lost wages from an ex-employee.

== Locations ==
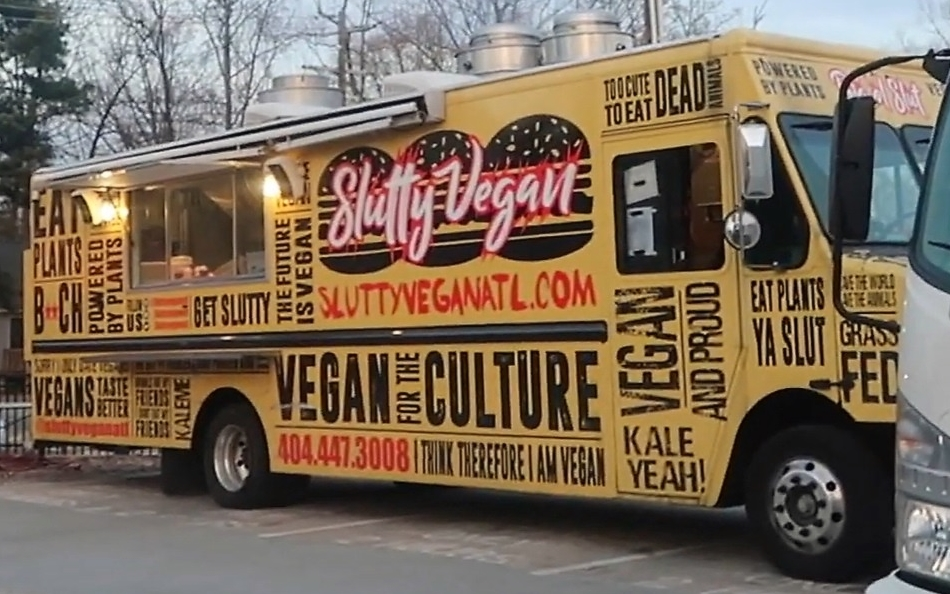
Slutty Vegan food truck in Durham, North Carolina, in 2020

In 2023, the restaurant had 11 locations in Georgia, New York City, Birmingham, Ala., and Dallas, with plans to open more, including locations in Baltimore. As of April 2023, the chain has five locations in the Metro Atlanta area and a plant-based bar, Bar Vegan. Cole also recently opened restaurants in Athens and Columbus, Georgia, Birmingham, Alabama, and Brooklyn and Harlem in New York City. There are also plans to open a new location once every month in 2023, in a different city. During the fall 2023 semester, a location is scheduled to open on the Spelman College campus.

The chain has a mobile food truck, which hosts pop-ups at various locations in the South.

== Pinky Cole ==
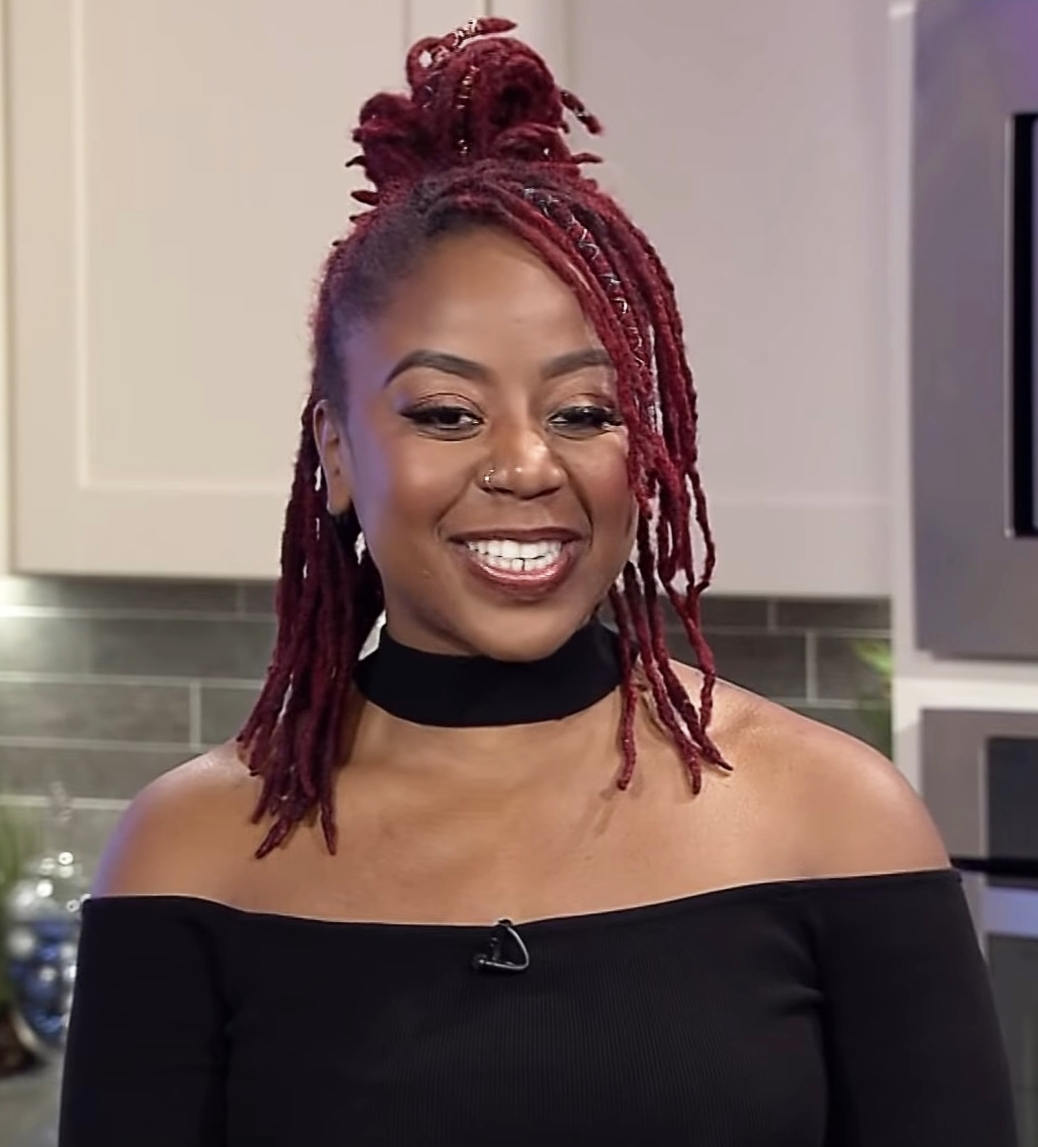
Cole on Sister Circle in 2018

=== Early life and education ===
Pinky Cole was born and raised in Baltimore. Her parents are Jamaican immigrants and Rastafarians; her mother Ichelle Cole is a musician in the reggae group Strykers' Posse and follows the traditional Rastafarian vegetarian diet. Her mother is a wealth adviser at PNC Bank Her father served prison time for the first 20 years of her life and was then deported to Jamaica. Cole became a vegetarian in 2007, and a vegan in 2014.

Cole received her bachelor's degree from Clark Atlanta University. She was elected “Miss CAU” in 2008 and is a member of Delta Sigma Theta sorority. After college, Cole moved first to Los Angeles to become an actress, and then to New York to work in television production. In 2010, she moved to Los Angeles and worked as a producer on the reality show Judge Karen’s Court. She left television briefly to launch a Harlem restaurant. In 2016, Cole moved back to Atlanta and worked as a casting director for programs such as Iyanla: Fix My Life.

=== Marriage ===
Cole met entrepreneur Derrick Hayes in 2020. The couple became engaged on July 2, 2022, and married on June 10, 2023, at The St. Regis Hotel in Atlanta. The ceremony was covered by the New York Times. Hayes is the owner of Big Dave's Cheesesteaks, a non-vegan cheesesteak restaurant based in Atlanta. They have a daughter, D'Ella (born 2021), and son, Derrick Jr. (born 2022). Hayes has two daughters from a previous relationship, Dallas and Denver. At their 2023 wedding, the couple announced Cole was pregnant and they are expecting a third child, a boy, in December.

=== Other ventures ===
In November 2022, Cole published a cookbook titled Eat Plants, B*tch: 91 Vegan Recipes That Will Blow Your Meat-Loving Mind. VegNews listed it as one of the "Top 100 Vegan Cookbooks of All Time" in 2024. She has also published a self-help book titled I Hope You Fail, which draws from her experiences as a restaurateur.

Cole also runs her own philanthropic organization, The Pinky Cole Foundation, which focuses on providing financial support and educational programs for children of color. She has also on multiple occasions provided financial assistance to students of her alma mater, Clark Atlanta University.

== See also ==
- List of Black-owned restaurants
