= Porsha Williams =

American television personality (born 1981)

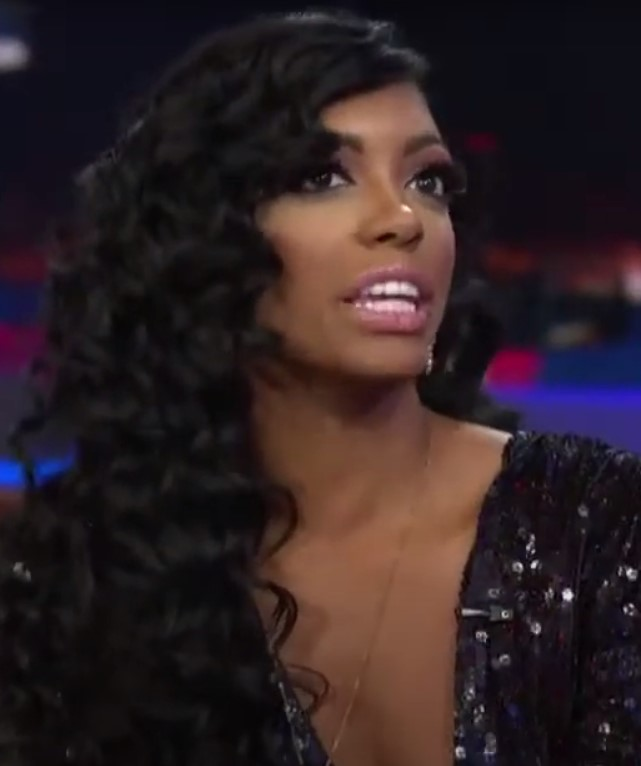
- Williams at The Arsenio Hall Show in 2014
- Born: Porsha Dyanne Williams; June 22, 1981 (age 45); Atlanta, Georgia, U.S.
- Other names: Porsha Stewart; Porsha Guobadia
- Education: American InterContinental University (BS)
- Occupations: Television personality; singer; actress; activist; author
- Years active: 2005–present
- Television: Porsha's Family Matters; The Real Housewives of Atlanta; Dish Nation; Celebrity Apprentice
- Spouses: Kordell Stewart (m. 2011; div. 2013); Simon Guobadia (m. 2022; div. 2025)
- Partners: Dennis McKinley (2017–2020); Patrice McKinney (2025–present)
- Children: 1
- Relatives: Juanita Terry Williams (grandmother); Hosea Williams (grandfather); Elisabeth Omilami (aunt)

Porsha Dyanne Williams (born June 22, 1981) is an American television personality, singer, actress and activist. She starred on the reality series The Real Housewives of Atlanta from 2012 until 2021, rejoining the cast in 2024. She also starred in the spin-off series, Porsha's Family Matters. From 2013 until 2021, she served as co-host of Dish Nation. She was co-host of Bravo's Chat Room in 2020, alongside Gizelle Bryant, Hannah Berner and Kate Chastain.

In 2014, she released her debut single, "Flatline." In 2021, she published her memoir, The Pursuit of Porsha.

== Early life and education ==
Williams was born on June 22, 1981, in Atlanta, Georgia. Her parents are self-employed entrepreneurs. She has a younger half-sister and an older brother. Her grandfather is Hosea Williams, a civil rights activist. She attended Southwest Dekalb High School, and later pursued a degree in business information technology at the American InterContinental University.

== Career ==
=== Early career ===
In 2005, when she was 24 years old, Williams opened a daycare facility, revealing that she was inspired by her parents' careers. Also in 2005, Williams modeled for a "pin-up" calendar for the Atlanta Dymes. Williams met football player Kordell Stewart in 2009. The couple married in May 2011, which was filmed and broadcast on the WE tv series Platinum Weddings.

=== 2012–2019: The Real Housewives of Atlanta, The Celebrity Apprentice, and music ===
In September 2012, it was announced by Bravo that Williams and Kenya Moore were cast for the fifth season of the reality television series The Real Housewives of Atlanta.

After approximately two years of marriage, Stewart filed for divorce from Williams in March 2013. During the reunion special for the sixth season of The Real Housewives of Atlanta, she commented that she was "totally blindsided" by the filing and alleged that she learned of their separation through Twitter. Their divorce was finalized in December 2013.

The sixth season of The Real Housewives of Atlanta documented the deterioration of Williams's relationship with her husband. After an episode of The Real Housewives of Atlanta broadcast in December 2013, Williams received criticism after making comments in which she indicated her belief that the Underground Railroad was an actual railroad line. She later commented that "It was a brain lapse. I have Porsha moments that you've seen on the show before. For me seeing that I knew that I had to go back and brush up on my history so I'm representing my legacy well." She also joined the cast of Kandi Burruss's stage musical A Mother's Love.

She released her debut single "Flatline" through the iTunes Store on March 17, 2014. Later that month, Williams received media attention after an altercation with Moore while filming the sixth season reunion for The Real Housewives of Atlanta. While filming the reunion special at the Biltmore Hotel on March 27, Moore implied that Williams was unfaithful during her marriage; after Williams called Moore a "slut from the '90s" and Moore yelled that Williams was "a dumb ho" from a megaphone, Williams assaulted Moore. Moore later threatened to quit the series if Williams was to remain, commenting that "we've become angry with each other, we've threatened each other and gone to the edge. But at the end of the day, we know there's a line." Williams was arrested on December 29, 2014, for speeding with a suspended license, but was released the same day.

In September 2015, Bravo announced that Williams had signed on to return as a main cast member, along with new cast member and actress Kim Fields. On January 28, 2016, it was announced that she was participating as a contestant on The New Celebrity Apprentice, also known as The Apprentice 15 and The Celebrity Apprentice 8. On September 19, 2018, Williams announced her pregnancy. On October 1, it was reported that she was engaged to entrepreneur Dennis McKinley. The proposal was shown on The Real Housewives of Atlanta (S11 Ep15) which aired February 17, 2019. On March 22, 2019, she gave birth to their daughter, showcased on her first spin-off Porsha's Having a Baby. Williams and McKinley briefly split in June, but had reunited by August 2019.

=== 2020–present: Activism, The Pursuit of Porsha, and Porsha's Family Matters ===
Williams departed The Real Housewives of Atlanta after its thirteenth season in 2021 to star in Porsha's Family Matters, a spin-off series which aired for one season.

Since the murder of George Floyd, Williams has worked as an activist and was described by The New York Times as becoming "a crusader against police violence." On July 15, 2020, Williams was among 87 protesters who were arrested outside the home of Kentucky Attorney General Daniel Cameron. She was calling for Cameron to arrest the officers involved in the shooting of Breonna Taylor. After law enforcement warned that staying on Cameron's property was unlawful, Williams and others in the group were charged with intimidating a participant in a legal process, disorderly conduct, and criminal trespass. She was released the next day.

In 2021, Williams published her memoir, The Pursuit of Porsha.

In March 2023, Williams starred in the third season of The Real Housewives Ultimate Girls Trip, as a last-minute replacement for The Real Housewives of New York City star Tinsley Mortimer.

In February 2024, Williams announced that she would be returning to The Real Housewives of Atlanta after a two-season hiatus. In June 2025, Williams joined the fourth season cast of the reality competition show The Traitors. In 2026, Bravo announced that Williams would be starring on the fifth season of The Real Housewives Ultimate Girls Trip: Roaring 20th edition, appearing alongside Gizelle Bryant, Teresa Giudice, Vicki Gunvalson, Lisa Barlow, Kyle Richards and Luann de Lesseps, which premiered on August 9, 2026.

== Personal life ==
Williams was married to Kordell Stewart from 2011 to 2013. Porsha was briefly engaged to entrepreneur Dennis McKinley, whom she was in a relationship with from 2017 to 2020. She gave birth to their child in March 2019. She married Nigerian businessman Simon Guobadia in a traditional Nigerian wedding on November 25, 2022, followed by a traditional American wedding the next day.

In February 2024, Williams filed for divorce from Guobadia, after 15 months of marriage. Since June 2025, she’s publicly expressed interest in dating across genders. In November 2025, Williams went public with girlfriend Patrice “Sway” McKinney.

== Filmography ==
=== Film ===
Year	Title	Role	Notes
2014	Not Another Zombie Movie....About the Living Dead	Zombie	
2017	CarGo	Carlotta (voice)	
2017	Sharknado 5: Global Swarming	Andromeda	TV movie
2020	Steppin' Back to Love	Veronica	TV movie
2022	Pretty Stoned		TV movie
2025	Single Black Female 3: The Final Chapter	Ebony Williams	TV movie

=== Television ===
Year	Title	Role	Notes
2012–present	The Real Housewives of Atlanta	Herself	Main Cast: Season 5–6, 8–13, 16–present; Recurring: Season 7
2013	I Dream of NeNe: The Wedding	Herself	Episode: "Cancel the Wedding!"
2015	David Tutera's Celebrations	Herself	Episode: "Porsha Williams"
2014–2021	Dish Nation	Herself/Co-Host	Main Co-Host: Season 2 & 4–13
2015–2016	The Real	Herself/Guest Co-Host	Guest Co-Host: Season 1 & 3
2017	The New Celebrity Apprentice	Herself/Contestant	Contestant: Season 15
2017	Star	Celebrity	Episode: "Infamous"
2019	The Real Housewives of Atlanta: Porsha's Having a Baby	Herself	Main Cast
2020	Insecure	Tasha	Episode: "Lowkey Feelin' Myself"
2020–2021	Bravo's Chat Room	Herself/Host	Main Host
2021	Love & Hip Hop: Atlanta	Herself	Episode: "Good Trouble"
2021–2022	Porsha's Family Matters	Herself	Main Cast
2022	Zootopia+	Christine (voice)	Episode: "The Real Rodents of Little Rodentia"
2022	Sherman's Showcase	Herself	Episode: "ShermaSnatch"
2023, 2026	The Real Housewives Ultimate Girls Trip	Herself	Main Cast: Season 3 & 5
2023	Stars on Mars	Herself/Celebronaut	Main Cast
2024	I Can See Your Voice	Herself/Guest Panelist	Episode: "Episode #3.12"
2025	Brilliant Minds	Bitsy	Episode: "Phantom Hook"
2025	Lego Masters Jr.	Herself/Celebrity Partner	Main Cast
2026	The Traitors	Herself/Contestant	Season 4; Eliminated, 22nd place

== Stage ==
Year	Show	Role
2013	A Mother's Love	Jada
2017	Two Can Play That Game	Connie

== Discography ==
Singles

Year	Title	Peak chart positions
Year	Title	US
2014	"Flatline"	96
