= List of programs broadcast by Bravo (American TV network) =

This is a list of programs broadcast by Bravo, an American cable and satellite television network owned by NBCUniversal that originated as a premium channel, when it launched in December 1980. The channel largely features on reality television, with some feature films and syndicated programming.

== Current programming ==
Title	Genre	Premiere	Seasons	Runtime	Status
Top Chef	Reality competition	March 8, 2006	23 seasons, 344 episodes	42 min	Renewed for season 24
The Real Housewives of Orange County	Reality	March 21, 2006	20 seasons, 367 episodes	42 min	Pending
The Real Housewives of New York City	Reality	March 4, 2008	16 seasons, 302 episodes	41–43 min	Season 16 currently airing
The Real Housewives of Atlanta	Reality	October 7, 2008	17 seasons, 360 episodes	41–43 min	Pending
The Real Housewives of New Jersey	Reality	May 12, 2009	14 seasons, 249 episodes	41–43 min	Season 15 due to premiere January 19, 2027
Watch What Happens Live with Andy Cohen	Late-night talk show	July 16, 2009	23 seasons, 3,205 episodes	22 min	Season 23 currently airing Renewed through 2027
The Real Housewives of Beverly Hills	Reality	October 14, 2010	15 seasons, 329 episodes	41–43 min	Renewed for season 16
Vanderpump Rules	Reality	January 7, 2013	12 seasons, 238 episodes	43 min	Pending
Married to Medicine	Reality	March 24, 2013	12 seasons, 206 episodes	41–43 min	Renewed for season 13
Below Deck	Reality	July 1, 2013	13 seasons, 193 episodes	42–54 min	Season 13 currently airing
Southern Charm	Reality	March 3, 2014	12 seasons, 166 episodes	42 min	Season 12 currently airing
The Real Housewives of Potomac	Reality	January 17, 2016	11 seasons, 198 episodes	42 min	Season 11 currently airing
Below Deck Mediterranean	Reality	May 3, 2016	11 seasons, 192 episodes	43–68 min	Renewed for season 12
Summer House	Reality	January 9, 2017	10 seasons, 154 episodes	44 min	Renewed for season 11
Below Deck Sailing Yacht	Reality	February 3, 2020	5 seasons, 89 episodes	42 min	Pending
The Real Housewives of Salt Lake City	Reality	November 11, 2020	7 seasons, 123 episodes	43 min	Season 7 currently airing
Southern Hospitality	Reality	November 28, 2022	4 seasons, 45 episodes	44 min	Renewed for season 5
Below Deck Down Under (seasons 2–5)	Reality	July 17, 2023	4 seasons, 70 episodes	43–54 min	Renewed for season 5
The Valley	Reality	March 19, 2024	3 seasons, 51 episodes	42 min	Renewed for season 4
Bravo's Love Hotel	Reality	April 27, 2025	1 season, 8 episodes	42 min	Pending
Next Gen NYC	Reality	June 3, 2025	2 seasons, 22 episodes	42 min	Renewed for season 3
The McBee Dynasty: Real American Cowboys (seasons 2–3)	Reality	June 30, 2025	3 seasons, 30 episodes	40–47 min	Pending
Kings Court	Reality	July 13, 2025	1 season, 10 episodes	42–49 min	Pending
Wife Swap: The Real Housewives Edition	Reality	October 21, 2025	1 season, 4 episodes	42 min	Season 2 due to premiere December 30, 2026
The Valley: Persian Style	Reality	January 8, 2026	1 season, 9 episodes	41–43 min	Renewed for season 2
The Real Housewives of Rhode Island	Reality	April 2, 2026	1 season, 14 episodes	42–55 min	Renewed for season 2
In The City	Reality	May 19, 2026	1 season, 11 episodes	42 min	Renewed for season 2
The Real Housewives of London	Reality	July 21, 2026	1 season, 12 episodes	43–50 min	Pending
The Real Housewives Ultimate Girls Trip (season 5)	Reality	August 9, 2026	5 seasons, 36 episodes	45–58 min	Pending
Still Flipping Out	Reality	September 28, 2026	1 season, 8 episodes	42 min	Season 1 currently airing
Small Town Trouble: Texas	Reality	November 18, 2026	1 season, 1 episode	42 min	Season 1 currently airing

== Upcoming programming ==
- Next Gen ATL

== Former programming ==
=== Unscripted ===
Former unscripted programming of Bravo
Title	First aired	Last aired	Season(s)
100 Days of Summer	January 7, 2014	February 25, 2014	1
The 100 Scariest Movie Moments	October 26, 2004	October 30, 2004	1
30 Even Scarier Movie Moments	October 2006	October 31, 2006	1
9 By Design	April 13, 2010	June 1, 2010	1
Après Ski	November 2, 2015	December 21, 2015	1
Around the World in 80 Plates	May 9, 2012	July 18, 2012	1
Backyard Envy	January 17, 2019	September 22, 2020	2
Battle of the Network Reality Stars	August 17, 2005	September 21, 2005	1
Being Bobby Brown	June 30, 2005	December 21, 2005	1
Below Deck Adventure	November 1, 2022	January 31, 2023	1
Best New Restaurant	January 21, 2015	April 1, 2015	1
Best Room Wins	May 1, 2019	July 3, 2019	1
Better Half	October 3, 2007	November 7, 2007	1
Bethenny & Fredrik	February 6, 2018	March 20, 2018	1
Bethenny Ever After	June 10, 2010	May 28, 2012	3
Blind Date	November 18, 2019	May 6, 2020	1
Blood, Sweat & Heels	January 5, 2014	June 14, 2015	2
Blow Out	June 8, 2004	September 1, 2006	3
Boy Meets Boy	July 20, 2003	September 2, 2003	1
Bravo A-List Awards	June 12, 2008	April 15, 2009	2
Bravo's Chat Room	September 27, 2020	August 29, 2021	1
Bravo's Play by Play	September 24, 2018	October 8, 2018	1
Buying It Blind	November 2, 2018	December 15, 2018	1
Camp Getaway	May 4, 2020	June 22, 2020	1
Cash Cab	October 7, 2019	August 26, 2020	1
Celebrity Poker Showdown	December 2, 2003	July 5, 2006	5
Chef Academy	November 16, 2009	January 11, 2010	1
Chef Roblé & Co.	December 4, 2011	July 24, 2013	2
Couch Talk with Captain Lee and Kate	August 14, 2023	October 16, 2023	1
Courtney Loves Dallas	December 5, 2013	January 23, 2014	1
Cyrus vs. Cyrus: Design and Conquer	May 25, 2017	June 29, 2017	1
Dancing Queens	May 9, 2023	June 27, 2023	1
Date My Ex: Jo and Slade	July 21, 2008	September 8, 2008	1
Denise Richards & Her Wild Things	March 4, 2025	April 8, 2025	1
Don't Be Tardy	April 26, 2012	December 29, 2020	8
Double Exposure	June 15, 2010	July 20, 2010	1
Dukes of Melrose	March 6, 2013	May 8, 2013	1
Eat, Drink, Love	August 11, 2013	September 26, 2013	1
Erika Jayne: Bet It All on Blonde	March 6, 2024	March 6, 2024	1
Euros of Hollywood	November 3, 2014	December 30, 2014	1
Extreme Guide to Parenting	August 7, 2014	September 18, 2014	1
Family Karma	March 8, 2020	February 26, 2023	3
Fashion Hunters	October 4, 2011	December 6, 2011	1
Fashion Queens	March 17, 2013	June 14, 2015	3
The Fashion Show: Ultimate Collection	May 7, 2009	January 25, 2011	2
First Class All the Way	November 3, 2008	December 8, 2008	1
First Family of Hip Hop	January 15, 2017	March 19, 2017	1
Fishing with John	November 20, 1991	December 25, 1991	1
Flipping Exes	August 6, 2019	September 17, 2019	1
Flipping Out	July 31, 2007	November 20, 2018	11
Friends to Lovers?	January 12, 2015	February 23, 2015	1
Gallery Girls	August 13, 2012	October 1, 2012	1
Game of Crowns	July 13, 2014	September 11, 2014	1
Gay Weddings	September 2, 2002	September 5, 2002	1
Gay Riviera	June 18, 2001	June 22, 2001	1
Get a Room with Carson & Thom	October 19, 2018	December 22, 2018	1
Hey Paula	June 28, 2007	July 27, 2007	1
I Dream of NeNe: The Wedding	September 17, 2013	October 27, 2013	1
In a Man's World	October 1, 2019	October 22, 2019	1
Inside the Actors Studio	August 14, 1994	January 11, 2018	22
Interior Therapy with Jeff Lewis	March 14, 2012	September 10, 2013	2
Invite Only Cabo	May 14, 2017	July 9, 2017	1
The It Factor	January 6, 2002	March 31, 2003	2
It's a Brad, Brad World	January 12, 2012	April 24, 2013	2
Jazz Counterpoint	1985	1985	1
Jersey Belle	August 4, 2014	September 2, 2014	1
Josh & Josh	December 23, 2021	January 13, 2022	1
Kandi & The Gang	March 6, 2022	May 8, 2022	1
The Kandi Factory	April 9, 2013	May 26, 2013	1
Kandi Koated Nights	July 1, 2018	July 15, 2018	1
Kandi's Ski Trip	May 17, 2015	June 7, 2015	1
Kandi's Wedding	June 1, 2014	July 6, 2014	1
Karen's Grande Dame Reunion	April 17, 2022	April 24, 2022	1
Kathy	April 19, 2012	March 28, 2013	2
Kathy Griffin: My Life on the D-List	August 3, 2005	August 3, 2010	6
Kell on Earth	February 1, 2010	March 29, 2010	1
LA Shrinks	March 4, 2013	April 22, 2013	1
Ladies of London	June 2, 2014	April 30, 2026	4
Launch My Line	December 2, 2009	February 3, 2010	1
Life After Top Chef	October 3, 2012	November 28, 2012	1
LOLwork	November 7, 2012	December 12, 2012	1
Love Broker	March 5, 2012	August 28, 2012	1
Love Match Atlanta	May 8, 2022	June 26, 2022	1
Love Without Borders	November 30, 2022	February 1, 2023	1
Luann & Sonja: Welcome to Crappie Lake	July 9, 2023	August 20, 2023	1
Mad Fashion	October 4, 2011	December 6, 2011	1
Make Me a Supermodel	January 10, 2008	June 3, 2009	2
Married to Medicine: Houston	November 11, 2016	December 30, 2016	1
Married to Medicine: Los Angeles	March 10, 2019	July 12, 2020	2
Manhunt: The Search For America's Most Gorgeous Male Model	October 12, 2004	November 30, 2004	1
Manzo'd with Children	October 5, 2014	October 30, 2016	3
Mexican Dynasties	February 26, 2019	April 30, 2019	1
Miami Social	July 14, 2009	August 18, 2009	1
Million Dollar Decorators	May 31, 2011	January 8, 2013	2
Million Dollar Listing Los Angeles	August 29, 2006	September 11, 2024	15
Million Dollar Listing Miami	June 25, 2014	August 13, 2014	1
Million Dollar Listing New York	March 7, 2012	August 26, 2021	9
Million Dollar Listing San Francisco	July 8, 2015	September 2, 2015	1
The Millionaire Matchmaker	January 22, 2008	March 29, 2015	8
Miss Advised	June 18, 2012	August 6, 2012	1
Most Eligible Dallas	August 15, 2011	October 17, 2011	1
Mother Funders	June 14, 2015	August 9, 2015	1
My Fab 40th	August 25, 2015	September 29, 2015	1
The New Atlanta	September 17, 2013	October 29, 2013	1
Newlyweds: The First Year	May 6, 2013	March 2, 2016	3
A Night with My Ex	July 18, 2017	September 19, 2017	1
NYC Prep	June 23, 2009	August 11, 2009	1
Online Dating Rituals of the American Male	March 9, 2014	April 8, 2014	1
Page to Screen	October 28, 2002	May 15, 2005	1
Party/Party	December 6, 2005	January 18, 2006	1
The People's Couch	October 8, 2013	May 26, 2016	4
Platinum Hit	May 30, 2011	August 15, 2011	1
Porsha's Family Matters	November 28, 2021	January 16, 2022	1
Porsha's Having a Baby	April 28, 2019	May 12, 2019	1
Pregnant in Heels	April 5, 2011	July 17, 2012	2
Princesses: Long Island	June 2, 2013	August 4, 2013	1
Project Runway	December 1, 2004	September 7, 2023	9
Property Envy	July 9, 2013	September 10, 2013	1
Queer Eye for the Straight Girl	January 11, 2005	May 8, 2005	1
Queer Eye for the Straight Guy	July 15, 2003	October 30, 2007	5
The Rachel Zoe Project	September 9, 2008	April 24, 2013	5
Real Estate Wars	October 5, 2017	November 30, 2017	1
Real Girlfriends in Paris	September 5, 2022	October 31, 2022	1
The Real Housewives of D.C.	August 5, 2010	October 21, 2010	1
The Real Housewives of Dallas	April 11, 2016	May 11, 2021	5
The Real Housewives of Dubai	June 1, 2022	September 17, 2024	2
The Real Housewives of Miami	February 22, 2011	October 16, 2025	7
Recipe for Deception	January 21, 2016	March 24, 2016	1
RelationShep	December 4, 2017	January 15, 2018	1
Relative Success with Tabatha	January 17, 2018	March 23, 2018	1
Rocco's Dinner Party	June 15, 2011	August 17, 2011	1
Ryan's Wedding	September 22, 2016	October 13, 2016	1
Secrets and Wives	June 2, 2015	July 21, 2015	1
Sell It Like Serhant	April 11, 2018	June 5, 2018	1
Shahs of Sunset	March 11, 2012	August 29, 2021	9
Shear Genius	April 11, 2007	April 7, 2010	3
Showbiz Moms & Dads	April 17, 2004	May 19, 2004	1
Showdog Moms & Dads	March 30, 2005	May 18, 2005	1
Situation: Comedy	July 26, 2005	September 9, 2005	1
The Singles Project	August 12, 2014	September 30, 2014	1
Sold on SLC	December 4, 2024	February 5, 2025	1
Southern Charm New Orleans	April 15, 2018	August 11, 2019	2
Southern Charm Savannah	May 8, 2017	September 3, 2018	2
Sports Kids Moms & Dads	June 1, 2005	July 20, 2005	1
Spy Games	January 20, 2020	March 9, 2020	1
Start-Ups: Silicon Valley	November 5, 2012	December 19, 2012	1
Step It Up and Dance	April 3, 2008	June 8, 2008	1
Stripped	December 5, 2017	January 30, 2018	1
Styled to Rock	October 25, 2013	December 27, 2013	1
Summer House: Martha's Vineyard	May 7, 2023	May 26, 2024	2
Surviving Mormonism with Heather Gay	November 11, 2025	November 11, 2025	1
Sweet Home	November 2, 2018	December 22, 2018	1
Sweet Home Oklahoma	March 20, 2017	August 7, 2017	1
SWV & Xscape: The Queens of R&B	March 5, 2023	April 9, 2023	1
Tabatha Takes Over	August 21, 2008	June 27, 2013	5
Tabloid Wars	July 24, 2006	August 21, 2006	1
Tamra's OC Wedding	September 2, 2013	September 16, 2013	1
Teresa Checks In	October 11, 2015	October 25, 2015	1
Texicanas	May 7, 2019	June 25, 2019	1
Then and Now with Andy Cohen	December 13, 2015	December 23, 2015	1
There Goes the Motherhood	April 20, 2016	June 8, 2016	1
Thicker Than Water	November 10, 2013	June 5, 2016	3
Thintervention with Jackie Warner	September 6, 2010	October 25, 2010	1
Tim Gunn's Guide to Style	September 6, 2007	November 20, 2008	2
Timber Creek Lodge	December 5, 2016	January 23, 2017	1
To Rome for Love	January 7, 2018	March 25, 2018	1
Toned Up	January 2, 2014	February 6, 2014	1
Top Chef Amateurs	July 1, 2021	September 2, 2021	1
Top Chef Duels	August 6, 2014	October 8, 2014	1
Top Chef: Just Desserts	September 15, 2010	October 26, 2011	2
Top Chef: Last Chance Kitchen	December 11, 2014	February 6, 2018	4
Top Chef Masters	June 10, 2009	September 25, 2013	5
Top Design	January 31, 2007	November 5, 2008	2
Tour Group	March 1, 2016	June 28, 2016	1
Unanchored	December 3, 2018	December 31, 2018	1
Untying the Knot	June 4, 2014	February 1, 2016	2
Vanderpump Rules After Show	November 6, 2015	March 7, 2016	1
Vanderpump Rules: Jax & Brittany Take Kentucky	August 23, 2017	September 26, 2017	1
Vanderpump Rules: Lisa Las Vegas	October 20, 2026	October 21, 2026	1
Welcome to the Parker	July 26, 2007	August 30, 2007	1
Welcome to Waverly	October 22, 2018	October 25, 2018	1
Winter House	October 20, 2021	December 19, 2023	3
Work of Art: The Next Great Artist	June 9, 2010	December 21, 2011	2
Work Out	July 19, 2006	June 10, 2008	3
Work Out New York	December 6, 2015	January 31, 2016	1
Xscape: Still Kickin' It	November 5, 2017	November 26, 2017	1
Your Husband is Cheating on Us	April 1, 2018	July 15, 2018	1
Yours, Mine or Ours	October 3, 2016	November 17, 2016	1

=== Scripted ===
Former scripted programming of Bravo
Title	First aired	Last aired	Season(s)
Breaking News	July 17, 2002	October 9, 2002	1
Dirty John	November 25, 2018	January 13, 2019	1
Girlfriends' Guide to Divorce	December 2, 2014	July 19, 2018	5
Imposters	February 7, 2017	June 7, 2018	2
Odd Mom Out	June 8, 2015	July 12, 2017	3
Significant Others	March 9, 2004	December 19, 2004	2

=== Acquired ===
Former acquired programming of Bravo
Title	First aired	Last aired	Season(s)
The Real Housewives of Auckland	July 22, 2017	September 23, 2017	1
The Real Housewives of Cheshire	November 14, 2015	February 6, 2016	1
The Real Housewives of Melbourne	February 23, 2014	May 15, 2016	3
