= The People's Couch =

Television series

- Genre: Reality television
- Based on: Gogglebox (British television series)
- Country of origin: United States
- Original language: English
- No. of seasons: 4
- No. of episodes: 57

Production
- Executive producers: Stephen Lambert; Eli Holzman; Tania Alexander; Aliyah Silverstein; Jacob Cohen-Holmes
- Running time: 23 minutes (episode 1–15); 43 minutes (episode 16–)
- Production companies: Studio Lambert; All3Media America

Original release
- Network: Bravo
- Release: October 8, 2013 – May 26, 2016

Related
- Celebrity Watch Party

The People's Couch is an American reality television series that premiered on October 8, 2013 on Bravo. It is based on the British television series Gogglebox. It started as a three-episode limited series that featured real people watching and discussing popular television shows and news from the past week.

Bravo later picked up the series for a full 12-episode season, and expanded the series into one-hour episodes beginning June 3, 2014. Bravo renewed The People's Couch for a second season, which premiered on October 7, 2014. The third season premiered on October 6, 2015. It was later renewed for a fourth season, which premiered on January 15, 2016. A celebrity edition of the show aired in 2020 under the name Celebrity Watch Party. In the UK and Australia it was renamed Celebrity Gogglebox USA.

== Format ==
Each episode of the series is split into separate segments, corresponding to the shows the groups watch. Not every group is featured in every segment, and each segment is often filmed on a different day of the week. The shows featured on the show range from cable to network television series and from scripted to unscripted, many of which air on Bravo, the same network as The People's Couch.

== Episodes ==
=== Series overview ===
Season	Episodes	Originally released	
Season	Episodes	First released	Last released
1	21	October 8, 2013	July 8, 2014
2	8	October 7, 2014	November 24, 2014
3	8	October 6, 2015	November 24, 2015
4	20	January 15, 2016	May 26, 2016

=== Season 1 (2013–14) ===
No. overall	No. in season	Title	Original release date
1	1	"Episode 1"	October 8, 2013
Shows featured: The Real Housewives of New Jersey, Long Island Medium, Dancing with the Stars, Untold Stories of the E.R., Scandal, Miley: The Movement.
2	2	"Episode 2"	October 15, 2013
Shows featured: Catfish, The Voice, I Dream of NeNe: The Wedding, American Horror Story: Coven, Abby's Ultimate Dance Competition, Beyond Scared Straight.
3	3	"Episode 3"	October 22, 2013
Shows featured: Million Dollar Listing, Criss Angel Believe, The Biggest Loser, The Walking Dead, What?! Bronies, Keeping Up with the Kardashians.
4	4	"Episode 4"	March 10, 2014
Shows featured: 86th Academy Awards, The Real Housewives of Atlanta, Game of Arms, The Voice, Rich Kids of Beverly Hills, House of Cards.
5	5	"Episode 5"	March 17, 2014
Shows featured: The Bachelor, Keeping Up with the Kardashians, Heirs to the Dare, The Real Housewives of New York, Shark Tank, Believe.
6	6	"Episode 6"	March 24, 2014
Shows featured: Dancing with the Stars, Crisis, Online Dating Rituals of the American Male, Naked and Afraid, Celebrities Undercover, Bizarre ER.
7	7	"Episode 7"	March 31, 2014
Shows featured: Here Comes Honey Boo Boo, RuPaul's Drag Race, The Good Wife, Survivor: Cagayan, Gigolos, Southern Charm.
8	8	"Episode 8"	April 7, 2014
Shows featured: The Walking Dead, Kim of Queens, Flipping Out, 19 Kids and Counting, Tattoo Nightmares, The Amazing Race.
9	9	"Episode 9"	April 15, 2014
Shows featured: Game of Thrones, Kitchen Nightmares, Nature, The Challenge: Free Agents, The Millionaire Matchmaker, My Big Fat American Gypsy Wedding.
10	10	"Episode 10"	April 22, 2014
Shows featured: Dance Moms, Celebrity Wife Swap, Game of Thrones, Minute to Win It, My Five Wives, The Real Housewives of Orange County.
11	11	"Episode 11"	April 29, 2014
Shows featured: Chrisley Knows Best, Long Island Medium, Deadliest Catch, Bam's Bad Ass Game Show, Devious Maids, Million Dollar Listing New York.
12	12	"Episode 12"	May 6, 2014
Shows featured: The Real Housewives of Atlanta, My Cat From Hell, Bring It!, 24: Live Another Day, Sex Sent Me to the ER, 16 and Pregnant, Hell’s Kitchen, American Dream Builders, Fish Tank Kings.
13	13	"Episode 13"	May 13, 2014
Shows featured: Married to Medicine, Freakshow, True Tori, The Ex and the Why, Resurrection, Mountain Monsters.
14	14	"Episode 14"	May 20, 2014
Shows featured: The Real Housewives of New York City, Louie, Revenge, Secret Lives of Stepford Wives, Life Below Zero, Small Town Security.
15	15	"Episode 15"	May 27, 2014
Shows featured: 2014 Billboard Music Awards, Ladies of London, The Bachelorette, Catfish, River Monsters, Iyanla: Fix My Life.
16	16	"Episode 16"	June 3, 2014
Shows featured: The Real Housewives of New Jersey, I Wanna Marry "Harry", Modern Family, So You Think You Can Dance, Little Women: LA, OMG EMT, Return to Amish, The Normal Heart, L.A. Hair.
17	17	"Episode 17"	June 10, 2014
Shows featured: Ladies of London, Men of the Strip, Deal With It, Sing Your Face Off, Food Network Star, Orphan Black, Mini Monsters, Party Down South, Our America with Lisa Ling.
18	18	"Episode 18"	June 17, 2014
Shows featured: 68th Tony Awards, Untying the Knot, Game of Thrones, Dog and Beth: On the Hunt, American Ninja Warrior, Pretty Little Liars, Marriage Boot Camp, The Numbers Game, True Tori.
19	19	"Episode 19"	June 24, 2014
Shows featured: Keeping Up with the Kardashians, Orange Is the New Black, Wipeout, Game of Crowns, The Last Ship, Here Comes Honey Boo Boo, Masterchef, Cry Wolfe, Life with La Toya.
20	20	"Episode 20"	July 1, 2014
Shows featured: Million Dollar Listing Miami, America's Got Talent, Celebrity Wife Swap, True Blood, Extreme Weight Loss, Too Cute, Frankenfood, CeeLo Green's The Good Life, Say Yes to the Dress: Atlanta.
21	21	"Episode 21"	July 8, 2014
Shows featured: The Real Housewives of Atlanta, Rising Star, Big Brother, Under the Dome, Drunk History, NY Med, Treehouse Masters, The Leftovers, Buying Naked.

=== Season 2 (2014) ===
No. overall	No. in season	Title	Original release date
22	1	"Episode 1"	October 7, 2014
Shows featured: Manzo'd with Children, Scandal, How to Get Away with Murder, The Voice, Last Week Tonight with John Oliver, The Amazing Race, Saturday Night Live, Pit Bulls & Parolees.
23	2	"Episode 2"	October 14, 2014
Shows featured: Below Deck, Dancing with the Stars, Dance Moms, American Horror Story: Freak Show, Are You the One?, Town of the Living Dead, Homeland, Hollywood Divas.
24	3	"Episode 3"	October 21, 2014
Shows featured: The Real Housewives of New Jersey, Wahlburgers, The Walking Dead, My Cat From Hell, Chrisley Knows Best, Monsters Inside Me, The Affair, Girlfriend Intervention.
25	4	"Episode 4"	October 28, 2014
Shows featured: Ghost Hunters, Grimm, Constantine, Botched, America’s Funniest Home Videos, Top Chef: Boston, The Simpsons, Monsters Behind the Iron Curtain.
26	5	"Episode 5"	November 4, 2014
Shows featured: Vanderpump Rules, The Biggest Loser, The Blacklist, Modern Family, The Real Apes of the Planet, Khloe and Kourtney Takes the Hamptons, Fake Off, Project Runway: Threads.
27	6	"Episode 6"	November 11, 2014
Shows featured: The Real Housewives of Atlanta, Skyscraper Live, Gotham, Masterchef Junior, Deal With It, Saturday Night Live, Transparent, Untold Stories of the E.R..
28	7	"Episode 7"	November 17, 2014
Shows featured: Revenge, Hell's Kitchen, Jane the Virgin, Survivor, The Ellen Show, Euros of Hollywood, Billy Bob's Gags to Riches, Storage Wars.
29	8	"Episode 8"	November 24, 2014
Shows featured: The Real Housewives of Beverly Hills, The Voice, How to Get Away with Murder, Shark Tank, Hollywood Film Awards, State of Affairs, Snooki & Jwoww, Too Many Cooks.

=== Season 3 (2015) ===
No. overall	No. in season	Title	Original release date
30	1	"Episode 1"	October 6, 2015
Shows featured: Scandal, Million Dollar Listing Los Angeles, The Muppets, Empire, Love at First Swipe, The Amazing Race, Grandfathered, The Daily Show with Trevor Noah.
31	2	"Episode 2"	October 13, 2015
Shows featured: The Real Housewives of New Jersey, How to Get Away with Murder, The Voice, The Unauthorized Beverly Hills, 90210 Story, Survivor, Keeping Up with the Kardashians, Madam Secretary, Botched.
32	3	"Episode 3"	October 20, 2015
Shows featured: The Walking Dead, Ladies of London, Crazy Ex-Girlfriend, Married at First Sight, Fargo, Little Women: LA, Saturday Night Live, Vet School.
33	4	"Episode 4"	October 27, 2015
Shows featured: Best Time Ever with Neil Patrick Harris, Don't Be Tardy, Jane the Virgin, Shark Tank, The Knick, Drunk History, Sex in Public, Red Oaks.
34	5	"Episode 5"	November 3, 2015
Shows featured: Manzo'd with Children, Supergirl, Dancing with the Stars, Cutthroat Kitchen, Wicked City, Hellevator, American Humane Association Hero Dog Awards, Pretty. Strong.
35	6	"Episode 6"	November 10, 2015
Shows featured: The Real Housewives of Atlanta, Blindspot, Ash vs. Evil Dead, Naked and Afraid, Coach Charming, MasterChef Junior, Agent X, Exorcism: Live.
36	7	"Episode 7"	November 17, 2015
Shows featured: Vanderpump Rules, The Voice, Scream Queens, Broke Ass Game Show, 49th CMA Awards, The Royals, Project Runway: Junior, Chrisley Knows Best.
37	8	"Episode 8"	November 24, 2015
Shows featured: Below Deck, Scandal, Lip Sync Battle, Chicago Med, Alaskan Bush People, Donny!, Tanked.

=== Season 4 (2016) ===
No. overall	No. in season	Title	Original release date
38	1	"Episode 1"	January 15, 2016
Shows featured: Lip Sync Battle, The Real Housewives of Beverly Hills, The Haves and the Have Nots, The Bachelor, Shades of Blue, American Idol, American Crime, SuperHuman.
39	2	"Episode 2"	January 22, 2016
Shows featured: The Real Housewives of Potomac, 73rd Golden Globe Awards, Hell's Kitchen, Skin Tight, Billions, Galavant, Colony, The Prancing Elites Project.
40	3	"Episode 3"	January 29, 2016
Shows featured: Crazy Ex-Girlfriend, Newlyweds: The First Year, The X-Files, Sex Sent Me to the ER, Baskets, Pitch Slapped, Hollywood Game Night, Undercover Boss.
41	4	"Episode 4"	February 5, 2016
Shows featured: Vanderpump Rules, The People v. O.J. Simpson: American Crime Story, Lucifer, 22nd Screen Actors Guild Awards, Transparent, You, Me and the Apocalypse, Little Women: Atlanta, Fameless.
42	5	"Episode 5"	February 12, 2016
Shows featured: Grease: Live, Girlfriends' Guide to Divorce, American Ninja Warrior, Chicago Fire, The Muppets, Fit to Fat to Fit, Untold Stories of the E.R..
43	6	"Episode 6"	February 19, 2016
Shows featured: The Real Housewives of Atlanta, Scandal, How to Get Away with Murder, Super Bowl 50 halftime show, Angie Tribeca, American Idol, Venom Hunters, Donald Trump's The Art of the Deal: The Movie.
44	7	"Episode 7"	February 26, 2016
Shows featured: The Walking Dead, Black-ish, Recipe for Deception, Hollywood Medium with Tyler Henry, Vinyl, Broad City, Dance Moms, Westminster Kennel Club Dog Show.
45	8	"Episode 8"	March 4, 2016
Shows featured: Keeping Up with the Kardashians, The Biggest Loser, Downton Abbey, Tour Group, Girls, Blindspot, Chelsea Does, Ink Master.
46	9	"Episode 9"	March 11, 2016
Shows featured: The Real Housewives of Atlanta, The Voice, Rosewood, Survivor, The Real O'Neals, The Family, Wahlburgers, Bar Rescue.
47	10	"Episode 10"	March 18, 2016
Shows featured: Last Man on Earth, Naked & Afraid, Fuller House, Gotham, RuPaul's Drag Race, Little Big Shots, 60 Days In, Vanderpump Rules.
48	11	"Episode 11"	March 25, 2016
Shows featured: The Real Housewives of Potomac, How to Get Away with Murder, The Bachelor, Project Runway: All Stars, Heartbeat, Chrisley Knows Best, Love, Insane Pools: Off the Deep End.
49	12	"Episode 12"	April 1, 2016
Shows featured: Empire, The Real Housewives of Beverly Hills, The Passion, Dancing with the Stars, The Catch, Long Lost Family, Gigolos.
50	13	"Episode 13"	April 8, 2016
Shows featured: The Real Housewives of New York City, The Late Late Show Carpool Karaoke Primetime Special, Pee-wee's Big Holiday, The Amazing Race, My Cat from Hell, Rush Hour, The Haunting of Kesha.
51	14	"Episode 14"	April 15, 2016
Shows featured: Shahs of Sunset,The Walking Dead, American Idol, The Blacklist, The Walking Dead, Who Do You Think You Are?, 51st ACM Awards, Strong, Gay for Play Game Show Starring RuPaul.
52	15	"Episode 15"	April 22, 2016
Shows featured: The Real Housewives of Dallas, 2016 MTV Movie Awards, American Grit, Ghost Brothers, Madam Secretary, iZombie, My Crazy Ex, Going Off the Menu.
53	16	"Episode 16"	April 29, 2016
Shows featured: Lucifer, Thicker Than Water, Girls, Inside Amy Schumer, The Night Manager, Alone, Monica the Medium, Skin Wars.
54	17	"Episode 17"	May 6, 2016
Shows featured: Game of Thrones, Lemonade, Below Deck Mediterranean, Catfish: The TV Show, Fresh Off the Boat, Chopped Junior, The Path, United Shades of America.
55	18	"Episode 18"	May 13, 2016
Shows featured: Dancing with the Stars, Unbreakable Kimmy Schmidt, Grey's Anatomy, There Goes the Motherhood, Containment, The Goldbergs, OutDaughtered, Arranged.
56	19	"Episode 19"	May 20, 2016
Shows featured: The Good Wife, Undercover Boss, The Detour, Coupled, Chelsea, First Impressions.
57	20	"Episode 20"	May 26, 2016
Shows featured: Empire, Southern Charm, The Bachelorette, Eurovision Song Contest 2016, Game of Thrones, The Voice, Hotel Hell.
