= List of television programs: K–L =

Alphabetically indexed lists of television programs
| 0–9 | A | B | C | D | E | F | G | H | I–J |
| K–L | M | N | O | P | Q–R | S | T | U–V–W | X–Y–Z |

This is an alphabetical list of television program articles (or sections within articles about television programs). Spaces and special characters are ignored. This list covers television programs whose first letter (excluding "the") of the title are K and L.

== K ==
=== Numbers ===
- K3
- K9

=== KA ===
- KaBlam!
- Kaeloo
- Kaiketsu Zorro
- Kaiketsu Zubat
- Kaiki Renai Sakusen
- The Kallikaks
- Kami-sama Minarai: Himitsu no Cocotama (Japan)
- Kamp Koral: SpongeBob's Under Years
- The Kandi Factory
- Kandi's Ski Trip
- Kandi's Wedding
- Kappa Mikey
- Karen (1964–1965)
- Karen (1975)
- Karen Sisco
- Kate
- Kate & Allie
- Kate & Mim-Mim
- Kate Plus 8
- Kath & Kim (Australia)
- Kath & Kim (US)
- Kathy
- Kathy Griffin: My Life on the D-List
- Kay O'Brien
- Kaz
- Kazoku no Katachi (Japan)
- Kazoops!

=== KC ===
- K.C. Undercover

=== KE ===
- Keep Breathing
- Keep It Spotless
- The Keepers
- Keeping Up Appearances
- Keeping Up with the Kardashians
- Keijo!!!!!!!!
- Kell on Earth
- The Kelly Clarkson Show
- The Kelly File
- Kemono Friends
- Kenan & Kel
- Kendra
- Kendra on Top
- Kenny the Shark
- Kenny vs. Spenny
- Kentucky Jones
- Kept
- Kern River
- Kerwhizz
- Kesha: My Crazy Beautiful Life
- Kevin Can F**k Himself
- Kevin Can Wait
- Kevin from Work
- Kevin Hill
- Kevin (Probably) Saves the World
- Kevin Spencer
- Key & Peele

=== KH ===
- Khloé & Lamar

=== KI ===
- Kick Buttowski: Suburban Daredevil
- Kickin' It
- Kid in a Candy Store
- Kid Cosmic
- Kid Nation
- Kid Paddle
- Kid vs. Kat
- Kidding
- Kidd Video
- The Kids Are Alright
- Kids Baking Championship
- kids choice awards
- kids choice sports
- The Kids from Room 402
- Kids Incorporated
- The Kids International Show
- The Kids in the Hall
- The Kids in the Hall: Death Comes to Town
- The Kids of Degrassi Street (Canada)
- Kiff (TV series)
- Kikoriki
- Killer Instinct
- Killer Karaoke
- Killer Kids
- Killer Women
- Kill la Kill
- The Killing
- Killing Fields
- Killing Eve
- Killjoys
- Kilroy
- Kim's Convenience (Canada)
- Kim Possible
- Kimba the White Lion
- Kimora: Life in the Fab Lane
- Kindergarten
- Kindred Spirits
- King
- The King Family Show
- The King and I (South Korea)
- King of Kensington
- The King of Queens
- King of the Hill
- Kingdom (UK)
- Kingdom (US)
- Kingdom Hospital
- Kingin' with Tyga
- Kingpin
- Kings
- Kings of Pain
- Kingston: Confidential
- Kinniku Banzuke (Japan)
- Kipo and the Age of Wonderbeasts
- Kipper
- Kirby Buckets
- Kissyfur
- Kitchen Boss
- Kitchen Confidential
- Kitchen Millionaire
- Kitchen Nightmares

=== KL ===
- Klondike
- Kleo the Misfit Unicorn

=== KN ===
- Knightfall
- Knightmare
- A Knight of the Seven Kingdoms
- Knight Rider (1982)
- Knight Rider (2008)
- Knight Squad
- The Knights of Prosperity
- Knots Landing
- Knowing Me, Knowing You
- Knuckles

=== KO ===
- The Koala Brothers
- Kodiak
- Kodoku no Gourmet
- Kody Kapow
- Kojak
- Kokkoku
- Kolchak: The Night Stalker
- The Kominsky Method
- K-On!
- Kourtney and Khloé Take The Hamptons
- Kourtney and Kim Take Miami
- Kourtney and Kim Take New York

=== KR ===
- Kraft Music Hall
- Kraft Television Theatre
- Kroll Show
- Krypto the Superdog
- Krypton
- The Krypton Factor

=== KU ===
- Kukla, Fran and Ollie
- Kung Fu
- Kung Fu Dino Posse
- Kung Fu Panda: Legends of Awesomeness
- Kunoichi (Japan)
- Kuu Kuu Harajuku

=== KV ===
- K-Ville

=== KW ===
- The Kwicky Koala Show

=== KY ===
- Kyle XY
- Kyōryū Sentai Zyuranger

== L ==
- The L Word

=== LA ===
- LA to Vegas
- L.A.'s Finest
- Lab Rats (UK)
- Lab Rats (US)
- Lab Rats: Elite Force
- Labor of Love
- L.A. Clippers Dance Squad
- La CQ (Mexico)
- Lachey's: Raising the Bar
- Ladies of London
- Lady Lovely Locks
- La Femme Nikita (Canada)
- Laguna Beach: The Real Orange County
- L.A. Hair
- LA Ink
- Lalaloopsy
- L.A. Law
- La Linea
- Lamb Chop's Play-Along
- Lamput
- Lancelot Link, Secret Chimp
- Lancer
- The Land Before Time
- Land of the Giants
- Land of the Lost (1974)
- Land of the Lost (1991)
- LAPD: Life on the Beat
- Laramie
- Laredo
- Larry King Live
- Larry King Now
- Larrymania
- Larva (TV series)
- Lassie
- Last Call
- Last Call with Carson Daly
- Last Comic Standing
- The Last Chance Detectives
- The Last Defense
- The Last Kids on Earth
- The Last Kingdom
- The Last Man on Earth
- Last Man Standing
- Last of the Summer Wine (UK)
- Las Vegas
- Last Week Tonight with John Oliver
- The Late Late Show
  - The Late Late Show with Craig Ferguson
  - The Late Late Show with James Corden
- Late Night
  - Late Night with Conan O'Brien
  - Late Night with David Letterman
  - Late Night with Jimmy Fallon
  - Late Night with Seth Meyers
- Late Night Joy
- The Late Show
  - Late Show with David Letterman
  - The Late Show with Stephen Colbert
- Later with Bob Costas
- Later with Greg Kinnear
- Later with Cynthia Garrett
- The Latest Buzz
- Laverne & Shirley
- Law & Order (UK)
- Law & Order
  - Law & Order
  - Law & Order: Criminal Intent
  - Law & Order: LA
  - Law & Order: Special Victims Unit
  - Law & Order: Trial by Jury
  - Law & Order True Crime
  - Law & Order: UK
- Lawman
- The Lawrence Welk Show
- The Layover
- Lazer Tag Academy
- LazyTown

=== LE ===
- The Lead with Jake Tapper
- The League of Gentlemen
- Leah Remini: It's All Relative
- Leah Remini: Scientology and the Aftermath
- Leap Years
- Leave It to Beaver
- Leave It to Lamas
- Legacies
- Legendary
- Legendary Dudas
- The Legend of Korra
- Legend of the Seeker
- The Legend of Tarzan
- The Legend of Zelda
- Legends of Chima
- Legends of the Hidden Temple
- Legends of Tomorrow
- Legion
- Legion of Super Heroes
- Lego Masters (UK)
- Lego Masters (US)
- Les Misérables
- Less than Perfect
- Let's Dance (Germany)
- Let's Make a Deal
- Let the Blood Run Free
- Lethal Weapon
- The Letter People
- Letterkenny
- Level Up
- Leverage
- Lewis (UK)
- Lexx
- Lego City
- Lego City Adventures
- Lego Friends
- Lego Star Wars: The Freemaker Adventures

=== LI ===
- Liberty Street
- Liberty's Kids
- The Librarians
- Lidsville
- Lie to Me
- Life
- Life After People
- The Life and Legend of Wyatt Earp
- The Life and Times of Juniper Lee
- Life Begins at Eighty
- Life Goes On
- Life in Pieces
- Life Is Wild
- Life is Worth Living
- Life of Kylie
- The Life of Riley
- Life of Ryan
- Life on Mars (UK)
- Life on Mars (US)
- Lifestyles of the Rich and Famous
- Life with Boys
- Life with Derek (Canada)
- Life with La Toya
- Life with Louie
- Life with Lucy
- Life's Too Short
- Life Unexpected
- Lightning Point
- Lights Out with David Spade
- Like, Share, Die
- Lilo & Stitch
- Lilyhammer
- Lily's Driftwood Bay
- Lime Street
- Limitless
- Lindenstraße (Germany)
- Lindsay
- Lindsay Lohan's Beach Club
- The Lineup
- Lingo (UK)
- Lingo (US)
- The Lion Guard
- The Lion, the Witch and the Wardrobe (British series) (1988)
- Lip Sync Battle
- Lip Sync Battle Shorties
- Lipstick Jungle
- Liquid Television
- Listen Up
- Little Bear
- Little Big Shots (Australia)
- Little Big Shots (UK)
- Little Big Shots (US)
- Little Bill
- Little Britain (UK)
- Little Britain USA
- Little Charmers
- The Little Couple
- A Little Curious
- Little Einsteins
- Little Ellen
- Little House on the Prairie
- A Little Late with Lilly Singh
- Little Lulu
- Little Lunch (Australia)
- The Little Mermaid
- Little Mosque on the Prairie
- Little Muppet Monsters
- The Little People
- Little People (2016)
- Little People, Big World
- Little People Big World: Wedding Farm
- The Little Prince (France)
- A Little Princess (1986)
- Little Rascals
- Little Robots
- Little Shop
- Little Women (UK) (1950)
- Little Women (UK) (1958)
- Little Women (UK) (1970)
- Little Women (Japan)
- Little Women (UK) (2017)
- Little Women II: Jo's Boys (Japan)
- Little Women: LA
- Little Women: NY
- The Littles
- Littlest Pet Shop
- Littlest Pet Shop: A World of Our Own
- Liv and Maddie
- Live at 3 (Ireland)
- The Live Desk (UK)
- The Live Desk (US)
- Live from Studio Five (UK)
- Live with Regis and Kathie Lee
- Live with Regis and Kelly
- Live with Kelly and Michael
- Live with Kelly and Ryan
- Live It Up!
- Live PD
- Lives on Fire
- The Living Century
- Living with the Enemy
- Living It Up! With Ali & Jack
- Living Lohan
- Living Single
- Livin' Lozada
- Liza on Demand
- Lizzie McGuire

=== LL ===
- Llama Llama
- Lloyd in Space

=== LO ===
- Lobo
- Location, Location, Location (UK)
- Lockie Leonard
- Lodge 49
- Loft Story (France)
- Logan's Run
- Lois & Clark: The New Adventures of Superman
- Loiter Squad
- Loki
- Lola & Virginia
- LoliRock
- LOLwork
- London Ink (UK)
- London's Burning (UK)
- The Lone Gunmen
- The Lone Ranger
- The Loner
- Long Island Medium
- Long Lost Family (Australia)
- Long Lost Family (UK)
- Long Lost Family (US)
- Longmire
- Longstreet
- Look Around You
- Look North
- Loonatics Unleashed
- Looney Tunes
- The Looney Tunes Show
- The Loop
- Loose Women (UK)
- Loosely Exactly Nicole
- Loopdidoo
- Looped
- Lopez
- Lopez Tonight
- Lopez vs Lopez
- Lore
- The Loretta Young Show
- Lorraine (UK)
- Lost
- Lost in Oz
- Lost in Space
- The Lost Prince
- The Lost Room
- Lost Song
- Lotsa Luck
- The Loud House
- Lou Grant
- Louie
- Love (2016–2018)
- Love (2026)
- Love, American Style
- Love and Marriage (1959–1960)
- Love and Marriage (1996)
- Love, Victor
- The Love Boat
- Love Connection
- Love, Death & Robots
- Love Games: Bad Girls Need Love Too
- Love Hina
- Love Is Blind
- Love Island (UK) (2005)
- Love Island (UK) (2015)
- Love Island
- Love Island Australia
- Love & Hip Hop
  - Love & Hip Hop: Atlanta
  - Love & Hip Hop: Hollywood
  - Love & Hip Hop: Miami
  - Love & Hip Hop: New York
- Love in the Wild
- Love Is in the Heir
- Love It or List It
- Love It or List It Vancouver
- Lovejoy
- Love Life
- Love of Life
- Love on a Rooftop
- Love, Sidney
- Love That Jill
- Love Thy Neighbor
- Lovetown, USA
- Love & War
- Loving

=== LU ===
- Lucas Tanner
- Lucha Underground
- Lucifer
- Lucky Louie
- The Lucy–Desi Comedy Hour
- The Lucy Show
- Lucy, the Daughter of the Devil
- Ludwig
- Luis
- Luke Cage
- Luna Petunia
- Lunar Jim
- Lunch with Soupy Sales
- Lupin the 3rd (Japan)
- Luther
- Lux Video Theatre
- Lucky Fred
- Lucky Star

=== LY ===
- The Lying Game

Previous: List of television programs: I-J Next: List of television programs: M
