= Kandi Burruss =

American TV personality, singer-songwriter (born 1976)

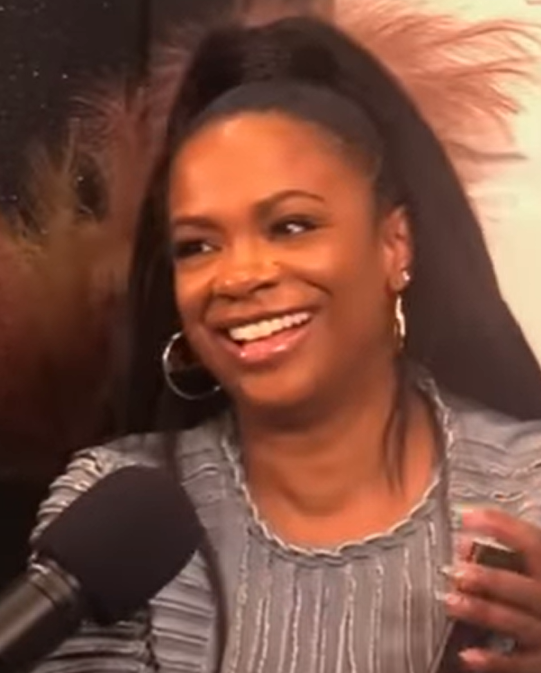
- Burruss in 2023
- Born: Kandi Lenice Burruss; May 17, 1976 (age 50); College Park, Georgia, U.S.
- Other name: Kandi Burruss-Tucker
- Occupations: Singer; songwriter; actress; TV personality
- Years active: 1990–present
- Spouse: Todd Tucker (m. 2014; div. 2026)
- Children: 3, including Riley
- Musical career
- Genres: R&B; pop; hip hop; soul
- Instrument: Vocals
- Labels: Sony; UpFront; BME; Asylum
- Member of: Xscape
- Website: kandionline.com

Kandi Lenice Burruss (born May 17, 1976) is an American singer, songwriter, actress and television personality. She first gained notice in 1992 as a member of the multi-platinum R&B female vocal group Xscape. As a songwriter, she has received writing credits on the singles "Bills, Bills, Bills" by Destiny's Child, "There You Go" by Pink, "Break Up with Your Girlfriend, I'm Bored" by Ariana Grande, and "Shape of You" by Ed Sheeran. In 2000, she won a Grammy Award for Best R&B Song for her work on the TLC hit song "No Scrubs".

Burruss' debut single "Don't Think I'm Not", as well as her appearances on the singles "4, 5, 6" by Solé, and E-40's "U and Dat" alongside T-Pain, have all reached the top 40 on the Billboard Hot 100. Additionally, she starred on the Bravo reality television series The Real Housewives of Atlanta from its second to fifteenth season, making her one of the longest-serving cast members in The Real Housewives franchise. Burruss has appeared in six Real Housewives spinoff and companion series as of 2022, beginning with 2012's The Kandi Factory, and continuing on with Kandi's Wedding (2014), Kandi's Ski Trip (2015), Xscape: Still Kickin' It (2017), and Kandi & the Gang (2022), all of which were aired by Bravo. Burruss also appeared as a guest in fellow housewife castmate Kim Zolciak's wedding special Don't Be Tardy for the Wedding (2012).

Burruss had a recurring role as Roselyn Perry in the third season of the Showtime drama series The Chi. She won the third season of the Fox competition series The Masked Singer, and became the show's first female champion. Additionally, she also placed fifth on the second season of Celebrity Big Brother on CBS. In 2023, her production work on a 2022 Broadway production of the play The Piano Lesson earned her a nomination for the Tony Award for Best Revival of a Play.

== Early life ==
Burruss was born May 17, 1976 in College Park, Georgia, the daughter of the Reverend Titus Burruss Jr. and Joyce Jones. She had an older brother, Patrick Riley (1968–1991), who died in a car crash. Burruss attended Tri-Cities High School in East Point, Georgia, graduating in 1994. She first appeared on the BET series Teen Summit at age 15.

== Career ==
=== Xscape ===
Prior to joining Xscape, LaTocha Scott had been performing with a group called Precise. While attending Tri-Cities performing arts high school in East Point, Georgia, Scott's sister Tamika met Kandi Burruss. The three began singing together and recruited a fourth member, Tamera Coggins, though her time with the group was short-lived. Soon Tameka "Tiny" Cottle was asked to audition for the girls, and Xscape was officially formed. After the group's major debut performance at BET's Teen Summit in 1992, the girls were introduced to record executive Ian Burke, who later became the group's manager. Xscape soon caught the attention of Jermaine Dupri, who later signed the group to his recording label So So Def Recordings.

On October 12, 1993, the group released their debut album, Hummin' Comin' at 'Cha. The album peaked at number seventeen the U.S. Billboard 200 and number three on the Top R&B Albums chart. It was a critical and commercial success, certified platinum within a year, and launched two top ten singles. After their debut album's success, Xscape released their second studio album, Off the Hook, in 1995. The album eventually went platinum. Their third and final studio album Traces of My Lipstick debuted at twenty-eight on the Billboard 200 and at six on the Hot R&B/Hip-Hop album chart; over a million copies were sold in the U.S. After Traces of My Lipstick, LaTocha Scott initially left the group to pursue a solo career. The ladies soon regrouped and made appearances on the Big Momma's House and Hardball soundtracks, before going on another hiatus until 2005.

In 2017, TV One had planned to produce an unauthorized movie about Xscape. Kandi called the other band members to discuss starting a show of their own. The show was named Xscape: Still Kickin' It, and set as a four-episode miniseries, which premiered on BravoTV on November 5, 2017. Before Kandi could rejoin the group, she wanted an apology from band member Tamika Scott, who claimed in a 2007 interview that Burruss broke up the group by sleeping with their label head Jermaine Dupri and his father, Michael Mauldin. Kandi wanted an apology for the false statement that Scott told regarding Mauldin, but did confirm that she and Dupri had been involved (though Burruss claims that wasn't the reason why the group broke up). Burruss received an apology from Scott on stage during a concert in Detroit in 2017.

=== Solo work and production ===
After the disbanding of Xscape, Burruss focused on production and songwriting. In 1999, Burruss co-wrote, along with Kevin "She'kspere" Briggs, three major hit songs: "No Scrubs" for TLC, "Bills, Bills, Bills" for Destiny's Child, and "There You Go", Pink's debut single. All three songs had writing involvement by their respective artists, and "No Scrubs" was also co-written by Burruss's former groupmate Tameka "Tiny" Cottle.

In 2000, Kandi released her debut album, Hey Kandi..., which spawned the singles "Don't Think I'm Not" and "Cheatin' on Me". "Don't Think I'm Not" reached number 24 on the Billboard Hot 100. The album did not do as well on the chart as the lead single did, reaching #72 on the Billboard 200.

Burruss won the American Society of Composers, Authors and Publishers's Songwriter of the Year award in 2000, in the Rhythm & Soul category. She was the first African-American woman to win the award.

Burruss rewrote and executive produced the 2009 song "Tardy for the Party" for her Real Housewives of Atlanta co-star Kim Zolciak. On March 12, 2013, Kandi Burruss, and her collaborating songwriter/producer, Rodney "Don Vito" Richard, filed suit against Zolciak for profits earned from "Tardy for the Party". In the documents filed by Burruss' attorney and RHOA castmate Phaedra Parks, Parks alleged her clients wrote the song for Zolciak and Zolciak released and sold the single "without [the] plaintiffs' authorization, license or consent." Burruss was also seeking a temporary restraining order to prevent future sales of the song and the "destruction of all copies of the infringing single and any other product of defendant's that infringe plaintiffs' copyrights", punitive damages, attorney's fees, and a jury trial. The lawsuit was dismissed on October 12, 2013, after the presiding judge deemed that Burruss failed to furnish enough evidence of copyright infringement.

Following a hiatus from music, Burruss recorded her first EP, The Fly Above EP, which was released on October 29, 2009. In December 2009, Burruss announced she had signed a deal with Asylum Records after her deal with Capitol Records fell through. Her second album, Kandi Koated, was released in December 2010. Burruss also teamed with Atlanta female rapper Rasheeda to form the duo Peach Candy.

The 2017 song "Shape of You" by Ed Sheeran, which ranks as one of the most successful singles of all time, drew comparisons in its lyrical rhythm to "No Scrubs", particularly in the pre-chorus line, "Boy, let's not talk too much/ Grab on my waist and put that body on me." As a result, Burruss, Cottle, and Briggs were awarded co-writing credits on "Shape of You".

=== Reality television ===
Replacing DeShawn Snow, Burruss joined The Real Housewives of Atlanta in its second season, which began airing in July 2009. From 2009 to 2023, she had appeared in every subsequent season of the show, becoming the series' longest-serving cast member. On a grander scale, she is currently tied with Teresa Giudice from The Real Housewives of New Jersey as the longest-serving full-time cast members of the entire Real Housewives franchise as of the premiere of RHOA's fifteenth season in May 2023, surpassing original Housewives Vicki Gunvalson of Orange County and Ramona Singer of New York City's joint record of thirteen full-time seasons. When she first joined the show, she had recently become engaged to her boyfriend A.J. and was shown expressing interest in reviving her music career. A feud developed between her and Nene Leakes after Burruss became friends with Zolciak and helped her record her single "Tardy for the Party". In the third season, Zolciak and Burruss continued recording music together, although they clashed over their creative differences. A conflict between Burruss, Leakes, and Zolciak later ensued while the latter two women embarked on a promotional concert tour. In later seasons, Burruss struck up a friendship with castmates Phaedra Parks and Porsha Williams, even starring the latter a role in her production of A Mother's Love, a play that Burruss and her husband, Todd Tucker, created and produced. Sometime during her pregnancy with son Ace, a rift was shown between Phaedra and Kandi, eventually souring due to unpaid production fees that Parks owed Tucker. In February 2024, Burruss announced she had departed the series.

Burruss received the second spin-off from The Real Housewives of Atlanta, The Kandi Factory, in 2012. It was originally planned as a one-time television special, but eventually ran for a full season. It followed Burruss and her record producers as they attempted to launch the music careers of undiscovered artists, with a new artist selected every episode. Burruss and Tucker then got another spin-off series on Bravo, titled Kandi's Wedding, which aired for five episodes in June and July 2014 and showed the two getting married. Kandi's Wedding brought in very high ratings for Bravo, and topped NeNe Leakes and Kim Zolciak's previous spin-offs. Her third spin-off series, Kandi's Ski Trip, was a three-part special that aired in 2015 after the conclusion of the seventh season of The Real Housewives of Atlanta.

Burruss was a contestant on the second season of the reality competition show Celebrity Big Brother. She placed fifth in the competition and was a fan favorite during her run on the show. She appeared as a guest judge on the "From Farm to Runway" episode of season 11 of RuPaul's Drag Race alongside model and actress Amber Valletta, which aired on April 11, 2019.

In 2020, she competed in the third season of The Masked Singer as "Night Angel". Burruss had been originally asked to compete in the first season, but was unable to participate due to other commitments. After watching T-Pain perform as "Monster" and having producers approach her again however, she reconsidered. Burruss won her season as the show's first female winner.

In 2022, Burruss began starring in Bravo's Kandi & The Gang.

=== Other ventures ===
In 2018, she made her Broadway debut as Mama Morton in the company of Chicago. She later returned to the Broadway stage in 2025 and 2026 as Angélique in & Juliet.

Burruss has made cameo appearances on series such as Single Ladies, Thicker Than Water: The Tankards, Chef Roblé & Co., and Let's Stay Together. Burruss also owns a sex toy company called Bedroom Kandi. Burruss and four friends started Kandi Koated Nights, a "sex and relationship" web series on Ustream. The show began airing on television in 2018. Burruss starred in the holiday themed BET+ original film, Whatever It Takes on December 21, 2023.

In 2025, both Burruss and husband Todd Tucker became part of the production team behind Broadway's Othello, starring Denzel Washington and Jake Gyllenhaal. Othello brought in $2.8 million in just its second week of previews. It consistently boasted 100 percent capacity to claim the record as the top-grossing play in Broadway history.

== Personal life ==
Burruss and her ex-boyfriend, Russell "Block" Spencer of Block Entertainment, share a daughter, Riley, who was born on August 22, 2002.

In late 2008, Burruss began a relationship with Ashley "A.J." Jewell and after several months of dating, the couple became engaged in January 2009. They ended their engagement that June and remained friends until Jewell died on October 2, 2009, after sustaining head injuries in a brawl. It was later determined he died from a previous medical condition and the charges dropped.

On January 15, 2013, Burruss announced via Twitter that she was engaged to Todd Tucker, a former line producer for The Real Housewives of Atlanta, whom she had been dating since 2011 while filming the fourth season. On April 4, 2014, the two were married in a lavish ceremony. In July 2015, Burruss announced that she was pregnant. She and Tucker had a son in 2016. They had a second child, a daughter, via surrogate in 2019. On November 20, 2025, the couple announced their decision to divorce after 11 years of marriage. The divorce was finalized in March 2026.

In June 2026, Burruss announced in an interview that she considers herself bisexual.

== Discography ==
Studio albums

- Hey Kandi... (2000)
- Can't Rain Forever (2006) (Shelved)
- Kandi Koated (2010)

== Filmography ==
=== Film ===
Year	Title	Role	Notes
2008	Make It Rain	Roxanne	
2014	A Mother's Love	Lena	Video
2014	Second Chance Christmas	Tina	TV movie
2014	Where's the Love?	Herself	TV movie
2018	Never Heard	Tara	
2019	Same Difference	Gloria	
2021	Seven Deadly Sins: Envy	Reagan	TV movie
2023	Pretty Stoned	Mrs. Thompson	
2023	The Pass	Shay	
2023	Whatever It Takes	Joan	TV movie
2024	The Underdoggs	Judge Tara	

=== Television ===
Year	Title	Role	Notes
1993–94	Soul Train	Herself (as Xscape)	Episode: "Episode #23.1" & "#23.17"
1996	New York Undercover	Herself (as Xscape)	Episode: "Sympathy for the Devil"
2009	The Jay Leno Show	Herself/Contestant	Episode: "Episode #1.37"
2009–23	The Real Housewives of Atlanta	Herself	Main Cast: Season 2-15
2010	Who Wants to Be a Millionaire	Herself/Celebrity Partner	Episode: "The Real Housewives of Millionaire 1-4"
2011	Are We There Yet?	Renee	Episode: "The Nick's Kid Episode"
2012	Let's Stay Together	Mabel	Episode: "Waiting to XXXhale"
2013	Married to Medicine	Herself	Episode: "Flatlining Friendships"
2013	The Kandi Factory	Herself	Main Cast
2014	Kandi's Wedding	Herself	Main Cast
2015	Unsung	Herself	Episode: "Xscape"
2015	Kandi's Ski Trip	Herself	Main Cast
2015–20	Love & Hip Hop: Atlanta	Herself	Guest Cast: Season 4 & 6 & 8-9
2017	Unsung	Herself	Episode: "Jagged Edge"
2017	Xscape: Still Kickin' It	Herself	Main Cast
2017	Saints & Sinners	Dr. Shelby Howard	Episode: "Playing Dirty"
2018	Kandi Koated Nights	Herself/Host	Main Host
2019	Celebrity Big Brother	Herself	Contestant: Season 2
2019	Wild 'N Out	Herself	Episode: "Andre Drummond/Kandi Burruss/Lil Baby"
2019	RuPaul's Drag Race	Herself/Guest Judge	Episode: "From Farm to Runway"
2019	Growing Up Hip Hop: Atlanta	Herself	Episode: "It's Gettin Hot in Herre"
2019	Black Love	Herself	Recurring Cast: Season 3
2020	The Masked Singer	Herself/Night Angel	Contestant: Season 3
2020	Celebrity Call Center	Herself	Episode: "The Shift with the Wannabe Wrestler"
2020	Insecure	Glenda	Episode: "Lowkey Feelin' Myself"
2020–25	The Chi	Roselyn Perry	Recurring Cast: Seasons 3–7
2021	For Real: The Story of Reality TV	Herself	Recurring Guest
2021	We Stay Looking	Lorraine Lawson	Episode: "Wet and Alone"
2021–22	Keeping Up with the Joneses	Herself/Narrator	Main Narrator
2022	I Can See Your Voice	Herself	Episode: "Episode #2.10"
2022	Kandi & The Gang	Herself	Main Cast
2022	Secret Celebrity Renovation	Herself	Episode: "Kandi Burruss"
2022	I Got a Story to Tell	Tammi	Episode: "Before I Let Go"
2022–23	À la Carte	Nicole	Recurring Cast
2023	SWV & Xscape: The Queens of R&B	Herself	Main Cast
2023	Celebrity Game Face	Herself	Episode: "Celebrity Pecker Problems"
2023	See It Loud: The History of Black Television	Herself	Episode: "Keeping It Real"
2023	Snake Oil	Herself/Celebrity Advisor	Episode: "Kandi Burruss and JB Smoove"
2024	Uncensored	Herself	Episode: "Kandi Burruss"
2024	Reasonable Doubt	Eboni Phillips	Recurring Cast: Season 2
2026	Survival of the Thickest	Drea Jay	Episode: "Make It Work, Bitch"

== Awards and nominations ==
=== Emmy Awards ===
The Southeast Emmy Awards are a division of the National Academy of Television Arts and Sciences. Burruss has been nominated twice.

Year	Award	Nominated work	Result
Southeast Emmy Awards
2023	Outstanding Historic/Cultural/Politics/Government/Societal Concerns Program	La Musica Familia	Nominated
2024	Outstanding Spanish Documentary	Detrás de la Canción	Nominated

=== Grammy Awards ===
The Grammy Awards are awarded annually by the National Academy of Recording Arts and Sciences. Burruss has won 1 award from 2 nominations.

Year	Award	Nominated work	Result
2000	Best R&B Song	"No Scrubs"	Won
2000	Best R&B Song	"Bills, Bills, Bills"	Nominated

=== Tony Awards ===
The Tony Awards are awarded annually by the American Theatre Wing and The Broadway League in recognition of excellence in live Broadway theatre. Burruss has been nominated once.

Year	Award	Nominated work	Result
2023	Best Revival of a Play	The Piano Lesson	Nominated

=== Miscellaneous awards and honors ===
Year	Organization	Award	Nominated work	Result	Ref.
2000	ASCAP Award	Songwriter of the Year	Herself	Won	
2012	AVN Awards	Best Overall Sex Toy Line	Bedroom Kandi, OhMiBod	Won	
2018	ASCAP Pop Awards	Winning songs	"Shape of You"	Won	
2019	People's Choice Awards	The Reality TV Star of the Year	The Real Housewives of Atlanta	Nominated	
2020	People's Choice Awards	Competition Contestant of 2020	The Real Housewives of Atlanta	Nominated	
2020	People's Choice Awards	The Reality TV Star of the Year	The Real Housewives of Atlanta	Nominated	
2022	People's Choice Awards	The Reality TV Star of the Year	The Real Housewives of Atlanta	Nominated	
2022	Ambies	Best Performer in Audio Fiction	We Stay Looking	Nominated	
2023	BET Her Award	Love Award	Herself	Honored	
2024	Drama League Award	Gratitude Award	Herself	Won	
2024	People's Choice Awards	The Reality TV Star of the Year	The Real Housewives of Atlanta	Nominated	
2025	The Bravos	The Wifetime Achievement Award	The Real Housewives of Atlanta	Honored	
