= Don't Poke the Bear =

Don't Poke the Bear may refer to:

- "Don't Poke the Bear", a song from the Wombats album Fix Yourself, Not the World
- "Don't Poke the Bear", a song from the Paul Draper album Spooky Action
- "Don't Poke the Bear", 3rd episode of Timber Creek Lodge
- "Don't Poke the Bear", 4th episode of the second season of Summer House (2017 TV series)
- "Don't Poke the Bear", 15th episode of the second season of Saving Hope

== See also ==
- Wikipedia:Don't poke the bear
