= Public sex (disambiguation) =

Public sex is a type of sexual activity that takes place in a public context.

Public sex may also refer to:

- Public Sex (film), a British romantic comedy film released in 2009
- Sex in Public (TV series), an American reality television series that aired on TLC in 2015
