= The Amandas =

- Starring: Amanda LeBlanc
- Country of origin: United States
- No. of seasons: 1
- No. of episodes: 10

Production
- Executive producers: John Ehrhard; Kimberly Cowin; Renee Simon; Sarah Weidman
- Production company: Pink Sneakers Productions

Original release
- Release: January 30 – April 12, 2012

The Amandas is an American reality television series on the Style Network. The series premiered on January 30, 2012. The Amandas follows home organizing expert Amanda LeBlanc, as she helps people turn cluttered spaces into usable areas.

== Episodes ==
No.	Title	Original release date
1	"OCD: Obsessive Compulsive Design"	January 30, 2012
2	"Swimming in Sequins"	February 6, 2012
3	"Icing on the Cupcake"	February 13, 2012
4	"My Mom Is a Mess"	February 20, 2012
5	"Make Room for Baby"	February 27, 2012
6	"Not So Easy in the Big Easy"	March 5, 2012
7	"Dustin in Charge"	March 14, 2012
8	"The Real Closets of Atlanta"	March 21, 2012
Note: NeNe Leakes is a celebrity guest client in this episode.
9	"Adventures in Atlanta"	March 28, 2012
10	"Big Money in the Big Easy"	April 4, 2012
