= Scott Crawford =

American chef and restaurateur (born 1972)

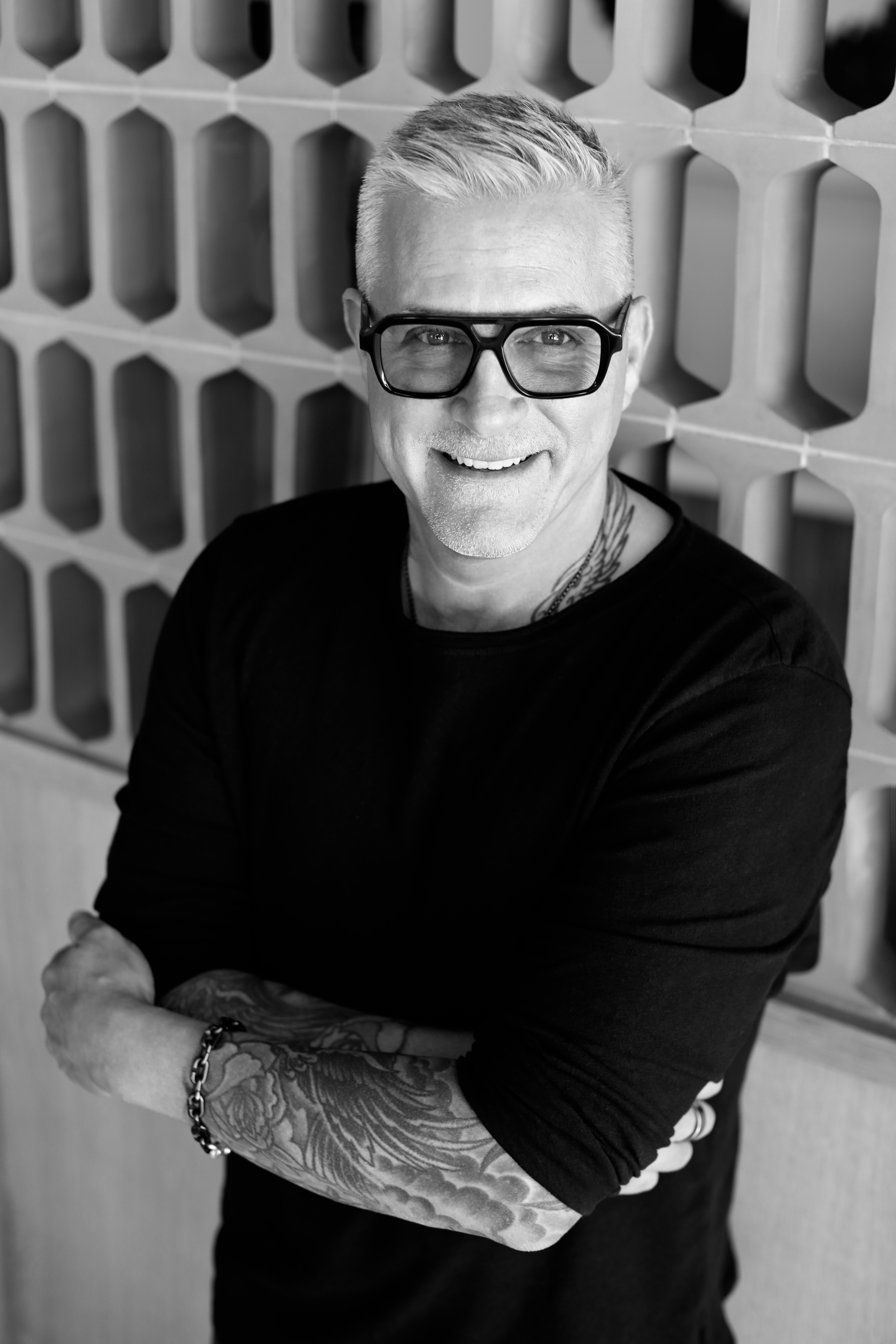
- Crawford's Portrait
- Born: 1972 (age 53–54); Pennsylvania, United States
- Culinary career
- Cooking style: American cuisine
- Current restaurant(s): Crawford & Son Jolie Brodeto Sous Terre Crawford’s Genuine Crawford Brothers Steakhouse
- Award(s) won: James Beard Foundation Award semifinalist (Best Chef: Southeast, five times) James Beard Outstanding Restaurateur nominee (2025) Winner, Recipe for Deception (2016)

Scott Crawford (born 1972) is an American chef and restaurateur based in Raleigh, North Carolina.

He is the owner of the Crawford Hospitality Group, which includes restaurants such as Crawford & Son, Jolie, and Brodeto.

He has been a five-time semifinalist for the James Beard Foundation Best Chef: Southeast award, and was nominated as a 2025 Outstanding Restaurateur.

His restaurant, Crawford & Son, was a finalist for the 2024 James Beard Award for Outstanding Hospitality. Three of his restaurants are featured in the Michelin Guide to the American South as "recommended." Crawford has been profiled in Garden & Gun, Bon Appétit, and Southern Living, and his recipes have appeared in The Wall Street Journal and Tasting Table. He won Bravo TV's Recipe for Deception in 2016.

== Biography ==
Crawford was born and raised in a small town near Pittsburgh, Pennsylvania. He experimented with drugs and alcohol during adolescence.

At age 17, he relocated to Florida and entered the restaurant industry, initially in front-of-house roles before moving into the kitchen. He later trained formally in culinary arts in Tampa, Florida. Early in his career, he worked under Chef Michelle Williams at The Hardshell in Richmond, Virginia. He also served as executive chef at the Amelia Island Ritz-Carlton and later at The Woodlands Inn, a Relais & Châteaux property, where he oversaw fine dining operations.

== Professional career ==
Under Crawford’s leadership, Herons at The Umstead Hotel and Spa received its first Forbes Travel Guide Five-Star Award, the only restaurant in North Carolina to achieve the distinction at that time. During his tenure as executive chef at The Georgian Room at The Cloister at Sea Island, Georgia, Esquire recognized the restaurant as a Best New Restaurant of 2006.

In 2016, Crawford opened his restaurant, Crawford & Son, in Raleigh. The restaurant was subsequently named Restaurant of the Year by The News & Observer and Indy Week. In 2019, he opened Jolie, a modern French bistro. He expanded his group to include Brodeto, a wood-fired Adriatic-inspired restaurant; Sous Terre, an underground cocktail bar; Crawford's Genuine at Raleigh-Durham International Airport; and Crawford Brothers Steakhouse, a modern American steakhouse in Cary.

Crawford has participated in culinary competitions and programs, including Bravo TV’s Recipe for Deception and the Peter Millar Artisans of Craft initiative.

== Personal life ==
Crawford is married and has two children.

== Advocacy ==
Crawford is an advocate for sobriety, hospitality workforce development, and community support. He founded the Raleigh chapter of Ben’s Friends, a peer-support organization for hospitality workers affected by substance use, and led the chapter for its first five years. He serves on the board of Healing Transitions, a Raleigh addiction and recovery center, and initiated its annual Freedom Harvest Dinner fundraiser. He has also supported disaster relief and food-security initiatives through Sunday Supper and Now Serving, and children’s charities such as Green Chair’s Sweeter Dreams.

== Awards ==
Crawford has received awards including the Triangle Business Journal CEO of the Year (2019) and NCRLA Restaurateur of the Year (2023). His restaurants have been recognized: Crawford & Son was named Restaurant of the Year by multiple local publications, and Jolie and Brodeto have been consistently highlighted for excellence. Crawford & Son was a finalist for the 2024 James Beard Award for Outstanding Hospitality.
