= Grant Robicheaux =

American surgeon accused of sexual assault

- Education: Louisiana State University (M.D.)
- Occupation: Orthopedic surgeon
- Television: Online Dating Rituals of the American Male
- Criminal charges: sexual assault
- Partner: Cerissa Riley

Grant Robicheaux is an American surgeon who appeared on an episode of the 2014 Bravo reality show Online Dating Rituals of the American Male. He received media attention in 2018 after he was accused of drugging and sexually assaulting multiple women.

== Early life and education ==
Robicheaux received his medical degree from Louisiana State University and completed his residency at University of California, Irvine Medical Center. He is a board-certified orthopedic surgeon.

== Career ==
Robicheaux appeared in 2014 on the Bravo show Online Dating Rituals of the American Male, which followed his search for a girlfriend. In 2013, Robicheaux was named "Orange County's Most Eligible Bachelor" by Orange Coast Magazine.

== Accusations of sexual assault ==
In 2018, Robicheaux and his girlfriend, Cerissa Riley, were charged with drugging and raping multiple women in Newport Beach, California. In April 2016, a woman stated that she had met Robicheaux and Riley in a local restaurant in April 2016 and that they invited her to a party. The woman stated that she consumed large amounts of alcohol before they invited her to Robicheaux's residence for an after-party, where they drugged, raped, and orally copulated her. The woman immediately contacted the police the next morning to report that she had been assaulted and a subsequent test of her blood showed multiple controlled substances in her body.

On October 2, 2016, a woman screamed for help and one of Robicheaux's neighbors called the Newport Beach Police Department. The woman stated that they drank alcohol together at a Newport Beach bar until the alleged victim was unconscious. She says that Robicheaux and Riley then brought her to Robicheaux's apartment and began sexually assaulting her. The police later stated that they had suspicions but did not have positive identity at the time of the reports. On January 9, 2018, police searched Robicheaux's home and found firearms and large quantities of illegal drugs, including the date rape drug gamma-Hydroxybutyric acid, MDMA, and cocaine. On September 6, 2018, the Newport Beach Police turned the investigation over to the Orange County District Attorney's Office. The District Attorney filed charges on September 11, 2018, and detectives arrested Robicheaux and Riley on September 12, 2018. Robicheaux and Riley were each released on a $100,000 bail. Following the charges, the California Medical Board opened an investigation into Robicheaux's conduct.

In a September 2018 press conference, the Orange County District Attorney, Tony Rackauckas, stated that detectives had found a video of the sex acts with one of the victim. Rackauckas also stated that there were additional videos, saying, "There are a substantial number of videos. I cannot tell you if it is tens or hundreds, it is certainly more than tens." Rackauckas said the victims in video appeared highly intoxicated, "beyond the ability to consent or resist," and that the women were barely responsive to sexual advances by Robicheaux and Riley. The case gained international attention because Rackauckas implied that there were up to 1,000 victims. Later, Rackauckas said that he had been misunderstood, that he did not mean to suggest there were up to 1,000 victims, and that they were instead reviewing up to 1,000 videos of possible victims. Robicheaux was charged with 16 felonies, including sexually assaulting seven women and Riley was charged with sexually assaulting five women. Robicheaux was also accused of possessing two illegal, unregistered assault rifles, four other firearms, and several large-capacity magazines.

=== Court proceedings ===
In February 2020, Todd Spitzer won the election for District Attorney, taking over Rackauckas' position. Spitzer believed that Rackauckas had used the case to attract positive media attention before the election for district attorney and stated he would move to have all charges filed by Rackauckas against Robicheaux and Riley dropped. In June 2020, Orange County Superior Court Judge Gregory Jones refused to drop the charges against Robicheaux and Riley and said both Rackauckas and Spitzer had used the case against each other while campaigning. Later in 2020, the Attorney General of California took over prosecuting the case.

In July 2021, a judge in the Orange County Superior Court dismissed charges related to two of the seven women who stated they no longer wanted to participate in the case and had been "dragged through the mud" by the Orange County District Attorney's office.

On July 7, 2023, Orange County Superior Court Judge Michael Leversen dropped all sexual assault charges against Robicheaux and Cerissa Riley, citing insufficient evidence. On Nov. 29, 2023, under the terms of a plea deal, Robicheaux pleaded guilty to a felony gun-possession charge and a misdemeanor drug charge. He was sentenced to two years probation on the felony gun-possession charge and one year of probation on the misdemeanor drug charge for possession of psilocybin. Robicheaux has reportedly filed a lawsuit against Orange County, seeking unspecified damages for what he alleges was malicious prosecution against him.
