= Kandi's Wedding =

American reality documentary television series

- Genre: Reality television
- Starring: Kandi Burruss; Todd Tucker
- Country of origin: United States
- Original language: English
- No. of episodes: 5

Production
- Executive producers: Steven Weinstock; Glenda Hersh; Lauren Eskelin; Kandi Burruss; Todd Tucker
- Camera setup: Multiple
- Running time: 42 minutes
- Production companies: True Entertainment; Kandi Koated Entertainment

Original release
- Network: Bravo
- Release: June 1 – July 6, 2014

Related
- The Real Housewives of Atlanta; The Kandi Factory; Kandi's Ski Trip

Kandi's Wedding is an American reality documentary television series that premiered on Bravo on June 1, 2014. Developed as a spin-off from The Real Housewives of Atlanta.

The five-part wedding series follows singer and reality television star Kandi Burruss and her husband Todd Tucker as they prepare for their wedding ceremony.

The series is the fourth out of five spin-offs of The Real Housewives of Atlanta, to feature Burruss.

== Background ==
Bravo announced Burruss and Tucker's wedding spin-off, Kandi's Wedding, on April 8, 2014. The sneak peek of the wedding special was released on April 29, 2014, and the show premiered on June 1, 2014. The series consisted of five episodes and concluded on July 6, 2014. This is the fourth spin-off of The Real Housewives of Atlanta and the second one starring Burruss, the other show being called The Kandi Factory which debuted on April 9, 2013 and was cancelled after one season.

Kandi Burruss and Todd Tucker got married at Le Fais Do-Do event facility in Atlanta, Georgia on April 4, 2014. Burruss' bridesmaids included matron of honor former Xscape member Tamera Wynn, maid of honor Carmon Cambrice, Xscape member and rapper T.I.’s wife Tameka "Tiny" Harris, Joyce Dallas, Fantasia Barrino, Love & Hip Hop: Atlanta cast member Rasheeda Frost, and The Real Housewives of Atlanta star Phaedra Parks. Other attendees included The Real Housewives of Atlanta co-stars Porsha Williams, Sheree Whitfield, Cynthia Bailey, Miss Lawrence and Derek J.

Each episode follows Kandi and Todd as they plan their lavish Eddie Murphy's Coming to America-themed wedding ceremony. The couple have decided to get married against vocal family opposition that played out during the sixth season of The Real Housewives of Atlanta, the show that they both star in. The couple decided that they would be able to pull off their wedding in five weeks without the help of a wedding planner. The newlyweds encountered with other major problems, including Kandi's mother Mama Joyce who was not very supportive of their wedding and has always felt very negative towards Todd, a man she repeatedly accused of being a "opportunist." Todd and Kandi also got into an argument because of the prenuptial agreement as Todd was not sure whether signing it would be a good idea—just one day before the wedding.

Kandi's Wedding is the highest-rated offshoot of The Real Housewives of Atlanta yet; the show brought in high ratings for Bravo, surpassing previous spin-offs starring NeNe Leakes and Kim Zolciak.

== Episodes ==
No.	Title	Original release date	U.S. viewers (millions)
1	"Say Yes to the Distress"	June 1, 2014	2.44
After a highly publicized engagement during the taping of The Real Housewives of Atlanta, Kandi and Todd have finally picked a wedding date. The first episode starts five weeks prior to the wedding ceremony. As Kandi united her team to help plan a Coming to America themed wedding, the troops start raising a question whether it is possible to pull off such extravagant wedding in so little time. At the same time, Mama Joyce still has doubts about the wedding and her sisters put effort into making her more supportive of the whole situation.
2	"Blessings and Dressings"	June 8, 2014	2.46
Kandi and Todd are startled when Mama Joyce referred Todd's deceased father as a "pimp." Kandi's wedding planning team deals with Carmon's emotional exit. In order to get her family all together for the big day, Kandi meets with her father and asks him to officiate her wedding ceremony. Her father, however, brings up family issues from the past. Todd asks for advice from Kandi's father and his close friend Apollo. In a dramatic face-to-face with Mama Joyce, Todd is finally able to stand up for himself against Mama Joyce, who is still negative towards him.
3	"Mother Tucker"	June 15, 2014	2.17
Only a few weeks are left until the special day. Kandi and Todd emotionally prepare for marital life. Todd's mother Sharon, referred to as Mother Tucker, arrives in Atlanta from New York and is unsurprisingly upset about Mama Joyce's behaviour towards her son. Kandi tries on her wedding dress. It gets really tense when Kandi's Matron and Maid of Honor confront each other at a bridal party gathering. Todd and Kandi's mothers get to meet each other at family dinner.
4	"Dis-Engaged"	June 22, 2014	2.56
Kandi sends Todd the prenup with expectations of him to sign it. A few days remain before the wedding and guests have started to arrive in Atlanta. Kandi and Todd's friends throw them pre-wedding parties. Kandi’s bachelorette party is a fun girls night with outrageous entertainment hand delivered by Phaedra. Todd’s bachelor party over at Bar One gets a little out of control with Todd nearly breaking the "party rules" Kandi had laid out for him. During the wedding rehearsal, things take a turn for the worse when the bride and the groom confront each other about the prenup.
5	"Meet the Tuckers"	July 6, 2014	2.82
The drama relating to the prenup continues from the night before Kandi's dream wedding. Todd refuses to sign the prenup and their friends start questioning whether the wedding is the best idea. Todd agrees to sign the papers because he realises that marrying Kandi is more important than anything. The drama didn't come to an end as Mama Joyce ignores Todd's teenage daughter, igniting a huge argument between Kandi and her mother just hours before the ceremony is scheduled to start.
