= The Kandi Factory =

Television series

- Genre: Reality competition
- Starring: Kandi Burruss
- Country of origin: United States
- Original language: English
- No. of seasons: 1
- No. of episodes: 8

Production
- Executive producers: Kandi Burruss; Glenda Hersh; Kevin Lopez; Mark Ford; Steven Weinstock
- Running time: 42–44 minutes
- Production companies: True Entertainment; Kandi Koated Entertainment

Original release
- Network: Bravo
- Release: April 9 – May 26, 2013

Related
- The Real Housewives of Atlanta; Kandi's Wedding; Kandi's Ski Trip

The Kandi Factory is an American reality competition series on Bravo that debuted April 9, 2013. Developed as a spin-off of The Real Housewives of Atlanta, starring Kandi Burruss.

The show chronicles Burruss and her team at The Kandi Factory as she assists 16 aspiring artists trying to jumpstart their dreams of success in the music industry.

The series is the second spin-off of The Real Housewives of Atlanta.

On August 30, 2013, Burruss confirmed that the series would not be returning for another season.

== Cast ==
- Kandi Burruss
- Don Vito
- Victor Jackson
- Kwame Waters

== Production ==
On September 29, 2011, Bravo announced The Kandi Factory as a one-time special without an air date. On February 22, 2012, Bravo announced that the special will be airing March 4 at 10:00/9:00c; after a new episode of The Real Housewives of Atlanta. Due to the substantial number of viewers of the special, Bravo picked up the series for a full season on April 4, 2012. Production for the first season of the series wrapped up on December 17, 2012.

== Contestants ==
The Kandi Factory contestants
Name	Hometown	Episode	Rank
Kristin Alonzo	San Antonio, Texas	Episode 6	Runner-up
Garrison Bailey	San Diego, California	Episode 5	Runner-up
Bryan Bourque	Church Point, Louisiana	Episode 8	Runner-up
Matthew Cash	Chicago, Illinois	Episode 2	Winner
Jennifer Chianesi	Cranston, Rhode Island	Episode 7	Winner
Kevin Dancy	Houston, Texas	Episode 5	Winner
Terrence Murphy	Macon, Georgia	Episode 7	Runner-up
Mejgan Sediqzadah	Flushing, New York	Episode 2	Runner-up
Cory Singer	South Plainfield, New Jersey	Episode 6	Winner
Logan Smith	Pittsburg, California	Episode 3	Winner
Lauryn Story	Houston, Texas	Episode 1	Winner
Harmik Thomasian	New Britain, Connecticut	Episode 3	Runner-up
Lizzy VanPatten	Marysville, Washington	Episode 4	Winner
Darian Wilkerson	Houston, Texas	Episode 1	Runner-up
Tasha Williams	Dayton, Ohio	Episode 8	Winner
Brandon Wolf	Canby, Oregon	Episode 4	Runner-up

== Episodes ==
The Kandi Factory episodes
No.	Title	Original release date	U.S. viewers (millions)
0	"Pilot"	March 4, 2012	1.37
1	"Get Your Game Face On"	April 9, 2013	0.67
In the series premiere, Kandi works with Lauryn, a 21-year-old African American student who has the dream to pursue a career in country music. Lauryn is pushed to an emotional state as she overcomes her personal struggles and proves that she's all in. Kandi's next contestant is Darian, a 27-year-old dance instructor, whose personality clashes with Kandi's production team. Kandi provides him some advice for in order to overcome his self-esteem issues.
2	"Booty's Tight, Timing's Right"	April 16, 2013	0.67
Kandi and her team work with Mujjy, a 26-year-old Afghani American hairdresser from New York. Despite her high self-confidence, Mujjy has pressure from the start due to her conservative cultural upbringing. Matthew Cash, a 26-year-old rapper from Chicago, comes into The Kandi Factory and stuns everyone with his creative writing skills. The team works to improve Matthew's lack of stage experience.
3	"The Freak Factory"	April 23, 2013	0.46
Two extremely different personalities enter The Kandi Factory. Logan, a 21-year-old baker from Utah, makes his grand entrance as his goth-rocking alter ego "Sweet Tooth". The team swiftly constructs a plan to convert his rocker attitude into a marketable artist. Harmik, a 27-year-old Iranian from Los Angeles, is introduced next with his unforgettable mustache. Harmik inspires to become the first mainstream gay rapper. Victor and Harmik are off to a rough start when an altercation erupts.
4	"Hoodwinked, Bamboozled, and Ambushed"	April 28, 2013	1.18
Lizzy, a 22-year-old singer/songwriter, enters The Kandi Factory. Her unstable relationship and past with her mother has kept her repressed from her music. Kandi tells Lizzy to channel her emotions into her music. Next up is Brandon, a 23-year-old Disney parade performer, who possesses all the attributes for stardom besides flavor. Drama erupts after Don Vito pushes Selasi too far. Phaedra Parks stops by to mediate the situation and set everyone straight.
5	"Jump Ya Bones"	April 30, 2013	0.65
Garrison, a 42-year-old administrator, has aspirations to become a rock star. She is forced to confront her fears about sexuality when Kandi composes her a song titled "The Mighty O", which is based on Garrison's own personal accounts with her sexuality. The next contestant is Kevin, a 28-year-old lawyer, who would like to become the next big R&B artist. Ruben Studdard makes a special guest appearance.
6	"Anything? Anything!"	May 5, 2013	0.88
Cory, an 18-year-old who has Autism, OCD, ADD and Tourette's syndrome, would like to start his music career equipped with his stellar vocals. Up next is, Kristin, a 25-year-old who inspires to achieve her musical dream that she promised her brother who perished in an accident. She is able to put all her emotions into her song titled "If You Were Here".
7	"Say Yes or Shut It Down"	May 12, 2013	0.59
Terrence, a 30-year-old from Macon, Georgia, is the latest addition to the Kandi Factory. He postponed his music endeavors to make sure his family had a place to stay and food to eat. He also plans to propose to his girlfriend, while on stage, during his showcase. Jennifer Chianesi, a 23-year-old, comes in with aspirations of becoming a rapper after she attended a well-known musical school. Her image is a little off but Kandi and her team manage to make it work.
8	"Hit It and Repeat"	May 26, 2013	0.62
In the series finale, Tasha enters the factory to pursue a rock n' roll career after her career was put on hold due to her home being foreclosed. Kandi creates the song, "Rock Bottom", for her but it brings back heavy emotions for Tasha. Bryan is the final contestant of the season, a 25-year-old aspiring country singer from Louisiana. After Kandi composes his song, he feels that it's too mainstream, which leads Kandi to having him sing the same song she created for Tasha — thus creating the Kandi Factory's first head-to-head showdown.
