= Kid in a Candy Store =

- Starring: Adam Gertler
- Country of origin: United States
- Original language: English
- No. of seasons: 2
- No. of episodes: 20

Original release
- Network: Food Network

Kid in a Candy Store is a reality television series that originally premiered on Food Network on July 12, 2010. The show follows Adam Gertler on his "hunt to find the craziest desserts in the world of candy confections".

== Production ==
To allow himself to have a spontaneous response on the show, Gertler tries to minimize what he learns about the places he visits even though he receives preparatory material. Filming takes place between September and April. Three places are profiled in every episode. Zap2it said the show mixed Gertler's 2009 show Will Work for Food's structure with Extreme Sweets, a Food Network special he presented. According to the San Antonio Current about an episode featuring the Tootie Pie Gourmet Café, "the cast was pretty type-based - a wide-eyed little girl, the all-American dad, the dynamic friend, or the jovial grandma".

== Reception ==
In a negative review, El Universo said, "While there are other programs in this category, Kid in A Candy Store does not have that element that elevates other productions, a charismatic driver. Gertler does not arouse any sympathy during his different presentations. Despite his effort and development before the cameras, he fails to convey the flavors and sensations of the tasted, providing an tasteless adventure among so many candy and caught cookies."
