= Courtney Loves Dallas =

American reality television series

- Genre: Reality
- Starring: Courtney Kerr
- Country of origin: United States
- Original language: English
- No. of seasons: 1
- No. of episodes: 8

Production
- Executive producers: Andrew Fried; John Ehrhard; Kimberly Belcher Cowin; Lauren Weinstein; Michaline Babich
- Running time: 22 minutes
- Production company: Pink Sneakers Productions

Original release
- Network: Bravo
- Release: December 5, 2013 – January 23, 2014

Related
- Most Eligible Dallas

Courtney Loves Dallas is an American reality television series that premiered December 5, 2013, on Bravo. Announced in August 2012, Courtney Loves Dallas chronicles the adventures of Courtney Kerr as she socializes, continues to start her new career, and looks for her future husband. The series is a spin-off of Most Eligible Dallas.

== Episodes ==
No.	Title	Original release date	U.S. viewers (millions)
1	"Courtney Loves Life"	December 5, 2013	0.47
In the series premiere, Courtney begins to put all of her attention on her fashion blog.
2	"Courtney Loves Fashion"	December 12, 2013	0.59
Courtney attends a party where her ex-boyfriend, Matt Nordgren, is at. Later, Courtney flies to New York City to discuss possibly collaborating on with a jewellery designer for an accessories line but her mind is still on Matt.
3	"Courtney Loves NYC"	December 19, 2013	0.62
Courtney heads back to New York City with her best friend, Tori, to experience New York Fashion Week and attend more meetings.
4	"Courtney Loves Mom"	December 26, 2013	N/A
Courtney is told that her mother might have cancer so Courtney and Tori drive up to Fort Worth to be there for her mother's surgery.
5	"Courtney Loves Love"	January 2, 2014	0.66
Courtney interviews several potential interns, and later agrees to meet with Matt for dinner.
6	"Courtney Loves Besties"	January 9, 2014	0.76
After her dinner with Matt, Courtney has an emotional break-down. To calm down, Courtney and Tori take a road trip.
7	"Courtney Loves Herself!"	January 16, 2014	0.63
Courtney doesn't attend Tori's birthday celebrations due to sudden job offer.
8	"Courtney Loves Friendship"	January 23, 2014	N/A
In the first season finale, Courtney begins her new job as a talk show host on The Broadcast at KTXD-TV.
