= Yours, Mine or Ours =

- Genre: Reality television
- Starring: Reza Farahan; Taylor Spellman
- Country of origin: United States
- Original language: English
- No. of seasons: 1
- No. of episodes: 10

Production
- Executive producers: Courtney Campbell; Kirk Hipkiss; Ryan Seacrest
- Running time: 42 minutes
- Production company: Joint Ventures Productions Inc.

Original release
- Network: Bravo
- Release: October 3 – November 17, 2016

Yours, Mine or Ours is an American reality television series that premiered on October 3, 2016, on the Bravo cable network. The series stars real estate agent Reza Farahan (known for appearing on Shahs of Sunset) and interior decorator Taylor Spellman who "help couples, living under separate roofs, figure out which residence they should call home".

== Episodes ==
No.	Title	Original release date	US viewers (millions)
1	"Before We Wed"	October 3, 2016	0.64
2	"The Proposal"	October 3, 2016	0.58
3	"Long Distance Love"	October 10, 2016	0.58
4	"Texas Two Step"	October 17, 2016	0.57
5	"Moving in With Mom"	October 24, 2016	0.64
6	"Sand or Surf"	November 3, 2016	0.43
7	"The Ex Factor"	November 10, 2016	0.44
8	"Opposites Attract"	November 10, 2016	0.34
9	"Rushing Into Things"	November 17, 2016	0.45
10	"Sleeping on the Stairs"	November 17, 2016	0.35
