= Mad Fashion =

- Genre: Reality
- Starring: Chris March
- Country of origin: United States
- Original language: English
- No. of seasons: 1
- No. of episodes: 10

Production
- Executive producers: Dean Slotar; Matt Westmore; Noah Scheinmann
- Running time: 22 minutes
- Production companies: Matt Westmore Media; No Regrets Entertainment

Original release
- Network: Bravo
- Release: October 4 – December 6, 2011

Mad Fashion is an American reality television series which premiered October 4, 2011, on Bravo. Mad Fashion follows former Project Runway contestant and celebrity designer Chris March as he creates unique outfits for his A-list clientele.

== Episodes ==
No.	Title	Original release date	U.S. viewers (millions)
1	"Shoegasm"	October 4, 2011	0.659
2	"Night of a Thousand Queens"	October 11, 2011	0.705
3	"Mardi Gras!"	October 18, 2011	0.702
4	"Double Design Trouble"	October 25, 2011	0.604
5	"One Humongous Headpiece"	November 1, 2011	0.635
6	"I Said Showstopper"	November 8, 2011	0.619
7	"Let Them Eat Cake"	November 15, 2011	0.697
8	"Wonderdog"	November 22, 2011	0.772
9	"A Brastrocity"	November 29, 2011	0.731
10	"The Met Ball"	December 6, 2011	0.718
