= Kandi & The Gang =

American reality television series

- Genre: Reality
- Starring: Kandi Burruss; Todd Tucker; Joyce Jones; Nora Wilcox; Bertha Jones
- Country of origin: United States
- Original language: English
- No. of seasons: 1
- No. of episodes: 10

Production
- Executive producers: Kandi Burruss; Todd Tucker; Steven Weinstock; Glenda Hersh; Lauren Eskelin; Lorraine Haughton-Lawson; Julie Lombardi; Camilo Valdes; Ronica Wynder
- Camera setup: Multi-camera
- Production companies: Truly Original; Kandi Koated Entertainment; T Tucker Productions

Original release
- Network: Bravo
- Release: March 6 – May 8, 2022

Related
- The Real Housewives of Atlanta

Kandi & The Gang is an American reality television series that premiered on Bravo on March 6, 2022. Developed as a spin-off of The Real Housewives of Atlanta, it has aired one season and features Kandi Burruss and the staff at her Atlanta restaurant Old Lady Gang.

The series follows Burruss and her husband Todd Tucker, with the staff as they revitalize the restaurant while juggling their existing careers and personal lives.

== Cast ==
=== Main cast ===
- Kandi Burruss
- Bertha Jones
- Joyce Jones
- Nora Wilcox
- Todd Tucker

=== Supporting cast ===
- Brandon Black
- DonJuan Clark
- Patrick Dallas
- Phillip Frempong
- Melvin Jones
- Torin Mitchell
- Brian Redmond
- Shawndreca Robinson
- Rashard Roles
- Dom'Unique Variety

== Episodes ==
No.	Title	Original release date	U.S. viewers (millions)
1	"Welcome to OLG"	March 6, 2022	0.49
2	"Family Recipe for Disaster"	March 13, 2022	0.49
3	"Rowdy Employees & Uptight Managers"	March 20, 2022	0.62
4	"Spilling the OLG Tea"	March 27, 2022	0.45
5	"He Looks Like a Snitch"	April 3, 2022	0.38
6	"Too Many Tuckers in the Kitchen"	April 10, 2022	0.50
7	"An Invitation Situation"	April 17, 2022	0.41
8	"Exes Who Lunch"	April 24, 2022	0.47
9	"Big "Peau" Poppin"	May 1, 2022	0.64
10	"Friday Night Vibe"	May 8, 2022	0.45
