= Most Eligible Dallas =

- Genre: Reality
- Country of origin: United States
- Original language: English
- No. of seasons: 1
- No. of episodes: 8

Production
- Executive producers: John Ehrhard; Kimberly Belcher Cowin
- Running time: 44 minutes
- Production company: Pink Sneakers Productions

Original release
- Network: Bravo
- Release: August 15 – October 17, 2011

Most Eligible Dallas is American reality television series on Bravo that premiered on August 15, 2011. The series follows a clique of friends in Dallas, Texas as they navigate through the local social scene.

== Cast ==
Cast: Tara Harper, Matt Nordgren, Drew Ginsburg, Courtney Kerr, Glenn Pakulak and Neill Skylar (from left)

- Courtney Kerr — Despite the series not being renewed a second season, Kerr received her own spin-off titled Courtney Loves Dallas which debuted in December 2013.
- Drew Ginsburg
- Glenn Pakulak
- Matt Nordgren
- Neill Skylar
- Tara Harper

== Episodes ==
| No. | Title | Original release date | U.S. viewers (millions) |
|---|---|---|---|
| 1 | "Plenty of Fish in the Big D" | August 15, 2011 | 0.78 |
| 2 | "Take the Bull by the Horns" | August 22, 2011 | 0.86 |
| 3 | "When Pigs Fly" | August 29, 2011 | 0.73 |
| 4 | "Make Love Not War" | September 5, 2011 | 0.95 |
| 5 | "Getting to Know You" | September 19, 2011 | 0.80 |
| 6 | "Friendly as Fire Ants" | September 26, 2011 | 0.70 |
| 7 | "Everything's Bigger in Texas" | October 3, 2011 | 0.79 |
| 8 | "Pony Up" | October 17, 2011 | 0.99 |
