= There Goes the Motherhood =

American reality television series

- Genre: Reality television
- Starring: Jill Spivack; Beth Bowen; Jen Bush; Meghan Conroy-Resich; Stefanie Fair; Leah Forester; Alisa Starler
- Country of origin: United States
- Original language: English
- No. of seasons: 1
- No. of episodes: 8

Production
- Executive producers: Dan Cutforth; Jane Lipsitz; Mark Ford; Nadine Rajabi
- Running time: 42 minutes
- Production company: Magical Elves

Original release
- Network: Bravo
- Release: April 20 – June 8, 2016

There Goes the Motherhood is an American reality television series that premiered on Bravo on April 20, 2016. The show features six mothers who go on an eight-week parent education course guided by parenting expert Jill Spivack. The cast include Beth Bowen, Jen Bush, Meghan Conroy-Resich, Stefanie Fair, Leah Forester, and Alisa Starler.

== Episodes ==
No.	Title	Original release date
1	"Welcome to Mommy Group"	April 20, 2016
2	"Make Good Choices"	April 27, 2016
3	"Mind Your Manners"	May 4, 2016
4	"Forty Not-So-Wonderful"	May 11, 2016
5	"I'm Sorry, But..."	May 18, 2016
6	"Mommy Dearest"	May 25, 2016
7	"Are You My Baby-Daddy?"	June 1, 2016
8	"Better Version of Me"	June 8, 2016

== Reception ==
Common Sense Media rated the show 3 out of 5 stars.
