= Sex in Public (TV series) =

American reality television series

- Genre: Reality television
- Starring: Jill Dictrow
- Country of origin: United States
- Original language: English
- No. of seasons: 1
- No. of episodes: 6

Production
- Running time: 22 minutes
- Production company: Barracuda Television Productions

Original release
- Network: TLC
- Release: October 2, 2015 – present

Sex in Public is an American reality television series that premiered on October 2, 2015, on TLC. The series is hosted by sex therapist Jill Dictrow who goes undercover in various places in order to approach people and help them dealing with their personal problems related to sex and dating.

Despite its title, the series does not actually deal with situations related to public sex itself, but rather confronts people who are not comfortable openly discussing their sex lives.

Due to its inappropriate content, the series was disapproved by the Parents Television Council, which criticised the network's programming decisions and described the show as "a desperate move to attract attention."

== Episodes ==
No.	Title	Original release date
1	"Massage Chair Matchmaker"	October 2, 2015
2	"Addicted to Dating Apps"	October 9, 2015
3	"Here Comes the Bride"	October 17, 2015
4	"Food Court Sex Talk"	October 24, 2015
5	"Sex in the Park"	November 7, 2015
6	"The Morning After"	November 14, 2015
