= Recipe for Deception =

- Genre: Reality competition; Cooking show
- Presented by: Max Silvestri
- Country of origin: United States
- Original language: English
- No. of seasons: 1
- No. of episodes: 10

Production
- Executive producers: Shauna Minoprio; Matt Berkowitz; Michael Davies
- Running time: 42 minutes
- Production companies: Embassy Row; Realizer Productions

Original release
- Network: Bravo
- Release: January 21 – March 24, 2016

Recipe for Deception is an American reality competition television series that premiered on January 21, 2016, on Bravo. Hosted by Max Silvestri, the cooking competition series features four chefs in each episode who compete with each other and get eliminated in head-to-head rounds. The chefs are judged on creating various dishes containing one specific ingredient. Chris Oh and Jonathan Waxman are the judges.

Judges Chris Oh and Jonathan Waxman evaluate the dishes based on taste, creativity, and the effective use of the hidden ingredient. Other contestants appearing in the series include chefs such as Jordan Andino, Todd Coleman, Dina Hanna, and Scott Crawford, who compete across the season’s episodes.

== Episodes ==
No.	Title	Original release date	U.S. viewers (millions)
1	"Cooks Can Be Deceiving"	January 21, 2016	0.42
2	"Masters of Deception"	January 28, 2016	N/A
3	"To Each His Chicharrones"	February 4, 2016	N/A
4	"Liar, Liar, Pans on Fire"	February 11, 2016	N/A
5	"You're Bacon Me Crazy"	February 18, 2016	N/A
6	"Celebrity Edition"	February 25, 2016	N/A
7	"Sweet Deceit"	March 3, 2016	N/A
8	"Two Truths and a Lentil"	March 10, 2016	N/A
9	"We Can Pickle That"	March 17, 2016	N/A
10	"In the Can"	March 24, 2016	N/A

== Broadcast ==
Internationally, the series premiered in Australia within hours of the American broadcast on January 22, 2016.
