= Timber Creek Lodge =

- Genre: Reality
- Country of origin: United States
- Original language: English
- No. of seasons: 1
- No. of episodes: 8

Production
- Executive producers: Andrea Gorfolova; Jameel Bharmal; Jeff Hevert; Bruce Tomes
- Running time: 42 minutes
- Production company: Tricon Film & Television

Original release
- Network: Bravo
- Release: December 5, 2016 – January 23, 2017

Timber Creek Lodge is an American reality television series that premiered on the Bravo cable network, on December 5, 2016. The show follows a group of staff members serving "a slew of elite clientele at an ultra-luxurious" ski lodge located near the village of Whistler, British Columbia, Canada.

== Cast ==
- Jamie Murphy, Lodge Manager
- Katy Ann Boyd, Lodge Manager
- Blake Dubler, Lodgehand
- Colston Villanueva, VIP Mountain Host
- Cynthia Barker, VIP Mountain Host
- Louise Robinson, Head of Housekeeping
- Mark Milburn, Senior VIP Mountain Host
- Jenna Gillund, Housekeeper/Server
- Nikita Williams, Chef

== Episodes ==
No.	Title	Original release date	US viewers (millions)
1	"A Hint of Nuts"	December 5, 2016	0.55
2	"The One Night Stand That Won't Go Away"	December 12, 2016	0.68
3	"Don't Poke the Bear"	December 19, 2016	0.55
4	"Resting Chef Face"	December 26, 2016	N/A
5	"Prickly Like a Cactus"	January 2, 2017	N/A
6	"Not My First Hall Pass"	January 9, 2017	N/A
7	"A Hard 7 at Best"	January 16, 2017	N/A
8	"He Gave Her the Tip"	January 23, 2017	N/A
