= I Dream of NeNe: The Wedding =

Television series

- Genre: Reality
- Starring: NeNe Leakes; Gregg Leakes
- Country of origin: United States
- Original language: English
- No. of seasons: 1
- No. of episodes: 7

Production
- Executive producers: Carlos King; Glenda Hersh; Lauren Eskelin; Megan Sanchez-Warner; NeNe Leakes; Steven Weinstock
- Camera setup: Multiple
- Running time: 42 minutes
- Production companies: NeNe Leakes Entertainment; True Entertainment

Original release
- Network: Bravo
- Release: September 17 – October 27, 2013

Related
- The Real Housewives of Atlanta

I Dream of NeNe: The Wedding is an American reality documentary television series that premiered on September 17, 2013 on Bravo. Developed as the third spin-off of The Real Housewives of Atlanta, featuring NeNe Leakes.

== Premise ==
I Dream of NeNe: The Wedding features the nuptials of former spouses NeNe and Gregg Leakes. This show also serves as a bridge in between the fifth and sixth seasons of The Real Housewives of Atlanta. The couple's marriage, divorce and reconnection have also been documented on The Real Housewives of Atlanta. It also chronicles NeNe in the weeks prior to the wedding as completes the preparations for the big day. With NeNe wanting to start her second marriage to Greg without any old issues, she improves her relationship with Gregg's children and also reunites with her father figure, Curtis. The couple married in a private ceremony among family and friends at the InterContinental Buckhead Hotel in Atlanta, Georgia on June 22, 2013. Her nine bridesmaids included Real Housewives of Atlanta co-star Cynthia Bailey and Real Housewives' recurring cast member Marlo Hampton.

== Episodes ==
No.	Title	Original release date	U.S. viewers (millions)
1	"Remix of Love"	September 17, 2013	1.56
After being married for 15 years and going through a divorce, NeNe and Gregg are engaged again — ready to take their second walk down the aisle. NeNe starts planning her extravagant wedding but before she does, she begins to clear any issues that are in the past so they don't rise in their new future. NeNe talks with her legal team regarding a prenup and starts to improve a few family relationships but Greg is hesitant at first to participate.
2	"Patch the Leakes"	September 24, 2013	1.22
NeNe's bridesmaids inform NeNe that they don't agree with who she's choosing for the bridal party. NeNe and Gregg haven't talked since their pre-marital counseling appointment. NeNe visits her good friend Donald Trump to receive some advice on how to handle her money, the prenup and step-families. NeNe confronts Gregg and tells him that he needs to improve the bond with his five kids.
3	"Bridesmaidzillas Stampede"	October 1, 2013	1.45
While improving her bond with Gregg's side of the family, NeNe comes to a major disagreement with Gregg's eldest son. NeNe takes her bridesmaids on a vacation back to Los Angeles to get away from the stress in Atlanta but the drama seems to find its way over.
4	"Cancel the Wedding!"	October 8, 2013	1.45
After returning to Atlanta, NeNe's wedding planner, Tiffany, is nowhere to be found. Once Tiffany shows up, all hell breaks loose. Gregg disagrees with some things and a verbal altercation follows. The prenup still isn't finished, and not much planning of the wedding has occurred, so NeNe is left hoping things can be completed in time.
5	"Spilling the Tea Party"	October 15, 2013	1.38
With three weeks until the wedding, NeNe has yet to accomplish much. No venue has been reserved, no invitations have been sent and the prenup still isn't drafted. NeNe's new wedding planner informs her that some elements to the wedding need to be left out due to the time limit, and her bridesmaids continue their drama. In an attempt to bring the peace, NeNe hosts a "spilling the tea" party.
6	"Something Blue"	October 22, 2013	1.39
NeNe takes her bridesmaids and heads to Cancún for a bachelorette weekend. NeNe informs the ladies that the trip will be drama free and peaceful. While on the trip, Marlo ends up ruining the fun by not participating in what everyone else is doing. The rest of the group feels that Marlo is wrong for trying to steal the spotlight and make a scene.
7	"Season Finale"	October 27, 2013	2.28
In the two-hour season finale, the wedding is just a few days away. NeNe is still putting the finishing touches on everything, but it still isn't looking like the wedding she envisioned. All of NeNe and Gregg's friends and family come together to share this moment as they take their second walk down the aisle.

== International broadcast ==
- In Australia, the series premiered on Arena on October 24, 2013.
