= NeNe Leakes =

American television personality, actress and presenter (born 1967)

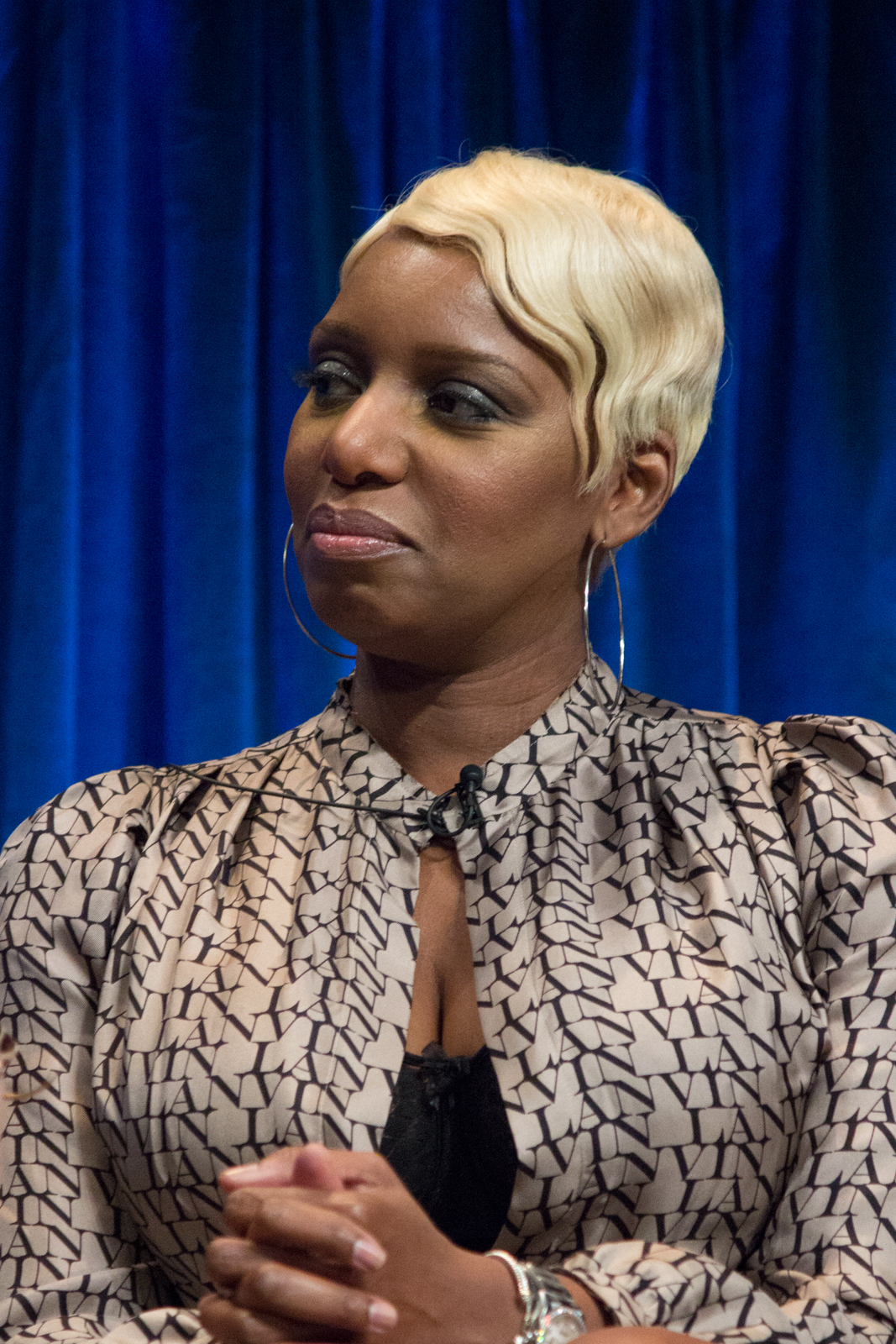
- Leakes in 2013
- Born: Linnethia Monique Johnson; December 13, 1967 (age 58); New York City, U.S.
- Education: Morris Brown College (two years)
- Occupations: Television personality; actress; businesswoman
- Years active: 1999–present
- Spouse: Gregg Leakes (m. 1997; div. 2011) (m. 2013; died 2021)
- Children: 2

Linnethia Monique "NeNe" Leakes (/ˈniːni liːks/; née Johnson; born December 13, 1967) is an American television personality, actress, and businesswoman. Born in Queens, New York and raised in Athens, Georgia, Leakes first rose to prominence after becoming the breakout star on Bravo's reality television series, The Real Housewives of Atlanta. She is widely regarded as one of the most notable personalities from The Real Housewives franchise and a prominent figure in reality television and pop culture. She was a participant on NBC's The Celebrity Apprentice and ABC's Dancing with the Stars.

As an actress, Leakes portrayed Roz Washington, on the Fox comedy-drama series Glee, and Rocky Rhoades on the sitcom The New Normal on NBC until its cancellation in 2013. Leakes made her Broadway debut as Madame in Rodgers & Hammerstein's Cinderella in 2014, and in 2015, starred as Matron "Mama" Morton in Chicago.

She was one of the regular panelists on ABC's revival of the 1950s game show To Tell the Truth. In addition to her television projects, Leakes had a clothing line on Home Shopping Network, before launching her SWAGG boutiques in select cities across the country.

== Early life ==
Linnethia Monique Johnson was born in Queens, New York City. One of five children, she and one of her brothers were sent to live with an aunt in Athens, Georgia, while the other three children stayed with her mother. It was believed that her mother could not take care of all five. After graduating from Clarke Central High School in Athens, she decided to further her formal education at Morris Brown College in Atlanta for two years before becoming pregnant.

== Career ==
Before Leakes met the producers of The Real Housewives of Atlanta, she had appeared on TV shows like The Parkers thanks to meeting casting director Robi Reed-Humes. In 2003, she landed a minor role as a stripper in the film The Fighting Temptations, starring Cuba Gooding, Jr. and Beyoncé. However, none of her scenes are present in the final edit of the movie.

In 2008, Leakes made her first appearance on The Real Housewives of Atlanta as an original cast member. After the first season, she co-wrote the book Never Make The Same Mistake Twice with Denene Millner. Leakes was a main cast member for the first seven seasons. In June 2015, Leakes announced that she would not be returning for the show's eighth season. However, Leakes was featured in season 8 of The Real Housewives of Atlanta in a supporting role, reportedly earning her full salary from the previous seven seasons. Leakes later returned to the show as a full-time housewife for the tenth through twelfth seasons (2017–20). In 2020, Leakes announced that she would not return to The Real Housewives of Atlanta for its thirteenth season.

In 2011, Leakes was a contestant in the eleventh instalment of Donald Trump's NBC series Celebrity Apprentice, where she quit in task 10. Leakes also transitioned into scripted television, playing the secretary Rocky Roades in the NBC comedy The New Normal. In 2012, Ryan Murphy cast Leakes in his series Glee in the third season in a recurring role as synchronized swim coach and Olympic bronze-medalist Roz Washington. During the tenth episode of Celebrity Apprentice, after arguments with fellow cast member Star Jones, Leakes walked off the show.

In 2013, Leakes founded her television production company, NeNe Leakes Entertainment. The company produced Leakes' spin-off series I Dream of NeNe: The Wedding alongside True Entertainment, which premiered on September 17, 2013. The same year, Leakes guest-hosted Anderson Live, The Talk, and appeared in Betty White's Off Their Rockers and The Price Is Right.

On March 4, 2014, she was announced as one of the celebrities who would compete in season 18 of Dancing with the Stars. She was paired with professional dancer, Tony Dovolani. Leakes and Dovolani were eliminated in Week 7 of competition (Latin Night) on April 28, 2014, finishing in 7th place. Also in 2014, Leakes played the Mistress of Sensuality in Las Vegas for resident show Cirque du Soleil: Zumanity. She would make her Broadway debut on November 25, 2014, as Madame in Rodgers & Hammerstein's Cinderella. She played the role until the production closed on January 3, 2015. In November 2015, she was cast as Matron "Mama" Morton in Chicago on Broadway for four weeks. In March 2016, Leakes announced that she would be touring the United States in a one-woman comedy tour called "So Nasty, So Rude," named after one of her catchphrases. The tour started in April, with many shows sold out.

Leakes released a song, entitled "Come and Get This Hunni", in April 2020.

In January 2024, Leakes was announced as a co-host on Zeus Network's Baddies East reunion by cast member Natalie Nunn. In March 2024, Leakes starred in Hunting Housewives, opposite Denise Richards, Melyssa Ford, and Kym Johnson-Herjavec for Lifetime.

In January 2026, it was announced that Leakes would be appearing as a guest on the fifth season of The Real Housewives Ultimate Girls Trip. She is set to appear during the Atlanta portion of the trip, marking her first appearance on Bravo since her exit in 2020.

== Other ventures ==
=== Fashion ===
In February 2014, Leakes announced that she would be launching a clothing line later in the year. On July 28, 2014, Leakes launched the Nene Leakes Collection for the Home Shopping Network (HSN).

Leakes opened the first SWAGG Boutique location in Duluth, Georgia in November 2017, and it closed in August 2020. She then expanded SWAGG Boutique to the MGM National Harbor in Maryland and to Miami Beach. The Maryland location closed in 2023.

=== Lounge ===
In October 2020, Leakes posted on Instagram that she would be opening a lounge in Duluth, Georgia. The Linnethia Lounge, named after Leakes' birth name, opened in May 2021. Singers such as KeKe Wyatt and Tamar Braxton have made appearances and performed concerts.

== Personal life ==
Leakes resides in Duluth, Georgia, a suburb of Atlanta. Her home is known as "Casa Leakes". Leakes listed the home for sale in October 2021.

She and husband Gregg Leakes separated in 2010, and she filed for divorce on April 29, 2010. The divorce was finalized September 29, 2011, after season four of The Real Housewives had finished shooting. NeNe and Gregg Leakes reunited and announced that they were engaged in January 2013. Bravo filmed their wedding planning and ceremony for a spin-off entitled I Dream of NeNe: The Wedding. NeNe and Gregg remarried on June 22, 2013, at the InterContinental Buckhead Hotel in Atlanta. In June 2018, she revealed that Gregg had stage 3 colon cancer but announced in May 2019 that he was cancer-free. In June 2021, she announced that the cancer recurred and that he was in the hospital recovering after surgery. Gregg Leakes died from colon cancer on September 1, 2021, at the age of 66.

On April 16, 2022, Leakes filed a federal lawsuit against NBCUniversal, Bravo, production companies True Entertainment and Truly Original, and Real Housewives producer Andy Cohen for violating federal employment and anti-discrimination laws. She dismissed the action and claims on August 19, 2022.

== Filmography ==
=== Film ===
Year	Title	Role	Notes
2003	The Fighting Temptations	Stripper	Deleted scene
2018	Uncle Drew	NeNe Leakes	Minor Role
2019	How High 2	Mrs. Silas	Television film
2019	Ride or Die	Glo	Television film
2024	Hunting Housewives	Rebel Carron-Whitman	Television film

=== Television ===
Year	Title	Role	Notes
2004	The Parkers	Minor role	1 episode
2008–2020	The Real Housewives of Atlanta	Herself	Main cast (seasons 1–7, 10–12); recurring (season 8)
2009–2020	Entertainment Tonight	Herself	
2011	The Celebrity Apprentice 4	Herself	Contestant; season 11; 10 episodes (7th place)
2012–2015	Glee	Roz Washington	Recurring role; 13 episodes
2014–2020	Extra with Billy Bush	Herself	
2012	The Amandas	Herself	1 episode
2012	The Game	Herself	1 episode
2012	Let's Stay Together	Herself	1 episode
2012–2013	The New Normal	Rocky Rhoades	Main cast
2013	Betty White's Off Their Rockers	Herself	1 episode
2013	The Price Is Right	Herself	1 episode
2013	Miss USA	Herself	Main judge, 1 episode
2013	I Dream of NeNe: The Wedding	Herself	Main cast; also executive producer; 7 episodes
2013–2017	Fashion Police	Co-host	Guest co-host (2013–15); co-host (2016–17)
2014	The Millionaire Matchmaker	Herself	1 episode
2014	Dancing with the Stars	Herself	Contestant; Season 18; 8 episodes (finished 7th/12)
2015	The Prancing Elites Project	Herself	1 episode
2015	Real Husbands of Hollywood	Herself	1 episode
2015–2016	New Year's Eve with Carson Daly	Co-host	Special broadcast from Times Square
2016	To Tell the Truth	Panelist	Television panel game show
2016	Larry King Now	Herself	1 episode
2016	Cupcake Wars	Competitor	1 episode
2016	Celebrity Family Feud	Competitor	Episode: "Lance Bass vs Kellie Pickler and Ernie Hudson vs Nene Leakes"
2016	Lip Sync Battle	Competitor	Episode: "NeNe Leakes vs. Todd Chrisley"
2016	Hollywood Medium with Tyler Henry	Herself	1 episode
2017	MasterChef Celebrity Showdown	Competitor	1 episode
2018	Uncensored	Herself	TV One production; 1 episode
2019	First Wives Club	Angel	Episode: "Diamonds Are Forever"
2020	Celebrity Ghost Stories	Herself	Episode: "NeNe Leakes"
2020	Celebrity Show-Off	Competitor	Season 1; 3 episodes
2020	Celebrity Call Center	Herself	Season 1; 1 episode
2020	Tamron Hall	Herself	Season 1; 1 episode
2021	Dynasty	Herself	Episode: "The British Are Coming"
2022	College Hill: Celebrity Edition	Herself	Main cast
2023	Lego Masters: Celebrity Holiday Bricktacular	Herself	Main cast
2024	Baddies East	Herself	Reunion co-host
2024	Baddies Caribbean	Herself	Auditions host
2024	Outrageous Love with Nene Leakes	Herself	
2025	The Upshaws	Rolanda	Episode: "Gone, But..."
2025	Clean Slate	Herself	Season 1, episode 6
2026	The Real Housewives Ultimate Girls Trip	Herself	Guest (season 5); 3 episodes

=== Music videos ===
Year	Song	Artist	Role
2015	"If I Don't Have You"	Tamar Braxton	Madam NeNe

=== Video games ===
Year	Video game	Character
2015	Kim Kardashian: Hollywood	NeNe Leakes

== Theatre ==
Year	Title	Role	Notes
2011	Loving Him Is Killing Me	Pinky Bell	Stage play (toured major U.S. cities)
2014	Zumanity	Mistress of Sensuality	Las Vegas resident show
2014–15	Rodgers + Hammerstein's Cinderella	Madame (Replacement)	The Broadway Theatre
2015	Chicago	Matron "Mama" Morton (Replacement)	The Ambassador Theatre
