= Thicker Than Water (2013 TV series) =

2013 American reality television series

- Also known as: Thicker Than Water: The Tankards
- Genre: Reality
- Starring: Ben Tankard; Jewel Tankard; Benji Tankard; Britney Tankard; Brooklyn Tankard; Cyrene Tankard; Diamond Tankard; Shanira Tankard
- Country of origin: United States
- Original language: English
- No. of seasons: 3
- No. of episodes: 27

Production
- Executive producers: Rebecca Toth Diefenbach; Valerie Haselton Drescher; D Renard Young; Lucilla D'Agostino; Caroline Self; Darren Toon
- Running time: 42 minutes
- Production companies: Sirens Media; John Doe Media

Original release
- Network: Bravo
- Release: November 10, 2013 – June 5, 2016

Thicker Than Water is an American reality television series that premiered on November 10, 2013, on Bravo. The series chronicles the family dynamic of former professional basketball player and an American gospel-jazz instrumentalist Ben Tankard, his wife Jewel and their children. Bravo previously aired a pilot titled Thicker Than Water: The Marinos in August 2011 that had the same premise but centered on a different family.

In April 2014, Bravo renewed Thicker Than Water for a second season, which premiered on January 4, 2015.

In February 2016, Bravo renewed Thicker Than Water for a third season that premiered on March 27, 2016.

== Cast ==
- Ben Tankard
- Jewel Tankard
- Benji Tankard
- Britney Tankard
- Brooklyn Tankard
- Cyrene Tankard
- Diamond Tankard
- Shanira Tankard

== Controversy ==
Cast member Diamond Tankard has had multiple run-ins with law. On September 6, 2023, Diamond was charged with assault and vandalism. On December 22, 2024, Diamond was charged with attempted first-degree murder after she allegedly intentionally struck a woman with her vehicle on November 29, 2024 in North Nashville, Tennessee. Diamond was also charged with leaving the scene of an accident involving injury and failing to render aid. She was placed at the scene of the crime due to the ankle monitor that she had been wearing at the time. On May 23, 2025, Diamond was arrested and charged with theft of property and aggravated assault with a deadly weapon for assaulting a woman with a sock full of rocks and stealing the woman's iPhone and Louis Vuitton handbag at a Tennessee Walmart. In the video of the assault, it appears to show Diamond wearing an ankle monitor.

== Episodes ==
=== Series overview ===
Season	Episodes	Originally released	
Season	Episodes	First released	Last released
1	8	November 10, 2013	January 5, 2014
2	9	January 4, 2015	March 15, 2015
3	10	March 27, 2016	June 5, 2016

=== Season 1 (2013–14) ===
No. overall	No. in season	Title	Original release date	US viewers (millions)
1	1	"Family Ties"	November 10, 2013	1.56
When Cyrene is asked to prom, Ben becomes protective of his youngest daughter and asks him a few questions. Brooklyn asks for the family's support when she participates in a marathon that's on the same day as Cyrene's prom. Britney and Brooklyn decide to go on a double date and their pasts are brought up.
2	2	"Sibling Biblery"	November 17, 2013	1.84
Jewel strives for financial independence while Ben preaches the importance of having wealth. Benji and Brooklyn have a sibling rivalry. Junice reveals some surprising information.
3	3	"Southern Discomfort"	November 24, 2013	1.62
Cyrene and Benji accuse Brooklyn. Brooklyn ends up crashing the family car. Junice begins to disclose family secrets.
4	4	"Not the Family Standard"	December 1, 2013	1.28
Jewel plans her parents' 46th wedding anniversary. Junetta, Junice, and Jewel attend counseling to settle their problems. Benji re-proposes to Shanira.
5	5	"Kandi Rocks"	December 15, 2013	2.05
Jewel's beliefs and parenting styles are tested when Kandi Burruss stops by. Brooklyn is having a difficult time balancing her career and being a mother. Cyrene's feelings toward Josh start to conflict with Jewel's strong opinions.
6	6	"The New F-Word: Forgiveness"	December 22, 2013	2.08
Jewel and Ben become worried about Brooklyn's drinking habits. Benji's wedding cost is starting to add up. Everyone learns that Cyrene is the only sister chosen to be a bridesmaid.
7	7	"Sisters of No Mercy"	December 29, 2013	2.00
Jewel continues to plan Benji and Shanira's wedding. Junice brings the family together for therapy. Brooklyn works on her material for the upcoming hair show.
8	8	"Wedding Bells & Farewells"	January 5, 2014	2.28
In the first season finale, Benji and Shanira's wedding day has arrived. Brooklyn surprises everyone by making a speech. The tension between Junice and Jewel continues to grow.

=== Season 2 (2015) ===
No. overall	No. in season	Title	Original release date	US viewers (millions)
9	1	"Act Like a Sister"	January 4, 2015	1.48
The Tankards throw a garden party to celebration of Cyrene's graduation from high school. With the 4th of July right around the corner, the family decide to take a journey to Baltimore to visit Jewel's other sister Junetta.
10	2	"Pregnant Pause"	January 11, 2015	1.68
The Tankards get home to Murfreesboro. Ben's oldest son Marcus celebrates his 30th birthday. The birthday party ends up with many surprises.
11	3	"Making Amens"	January 18, 2015	1.37
12	4	"Daddy Issues"	January 25, 2015	1.63
13	5	"Lock It Up"	February 8, 2015	1.10
14	6	"The Ben Honors"	February 15, 2015	1.11
15	7	"Tankard Road Diaries"	March 1, 2015	1.49
16	8	"Hairy Situation"	March 8, 2015	1.69
17	9	"Empty Tank"	March 15, 2015	1.41

=== Season 3 (2016) ===
No. overall	No. in season	Title	Original release date	US viewers (millions)
18	1	"Still Thicker Than Ever?"	March 27, 2016	1.06
19	2	"Micro-Momager"	April 3, 2016	N/A
20	3	"Hard Knock Life"	April 17, 2016	N/A
21	4	"Oh Baby!"	April 24, 2016	N/A
22	5	"Family Feuds"	May 1, 2016	N/A
23	6	"Through Thick and Thin"	May 8, 2016	N/A
24	7	"Love, Marriage and Madness"	May 15, 2016	N/A
25	8	"The Ties That Bind"	May 22, 2016	N/A
26	9	"Secrets Revealed"	May 29, 2016	N/A
27	10	"Family First"	June 5, 2016	N/A
