= Online Dating Rituals of the American Male =

- Genre: Reality
- Country of origin: United States
- Original language: English
- No. of seasons: 1
- No. of episodes: 6

Production
- Executive producers: Dan Cutforth; Jane Lipsitz; Jeff Gaspin; Mandy Salangsang
- Camera setup: Multiple
- Running time: 42 minutes
- Production company: Magical Elves Productions

Original release
- Network: Bravo
- Release: March 9 – April 8, 2014

Online Dating Rituals of the American Male is an American reality television series on Bravo. The series premiered on Sunday, March 9, 2014, prior to moving to its regular time slot on Thursday, March 13, 2014. It follows several men who are looking for everything from a one-night stand to their future wives via the internet.

== Episodes ==
No.	Title	Original release date	U.S. viewers (millions)
1	"Marcus & Alex"	March 9, 2014	1.12
Alex starts his online journey looking for a one-night stand but eventually finds a girl that he feels is special. Marcus is a recent divorcee and now looking for his next wife.
2	"Brian & Ephraim"	March 13, 2014	0.65
Brian wants to play the field after his breakup. Ephraim, a single father, begins looking for a girlfriend but is told that he has too high of expectations.
3	"Jason & Matt"	March 20, 2014	0.71
4	"Travis & Davey"	March 27, 2014	N/A
5	"Grant & J. Keith"	April 1, 2014	N/A
6	"Scott & Adey"	April 8, 2014	N/A
