= Kandi's Ski Trip =

US television program

- Genre: Reality television
- Starring: Kandi Burruss; Todd Tucker
- Country of origin: United States
- Original language: English
- No. of seasons: 1
- No. of episodes: 3

Production
- Executive producers: Steven Weinstock; Glenda Hersh; Lauren Eskelin; Carlos King; Lorraine Haughton; Kandi Burruss; Todd Tucker
- Camera setup: Multiple
- Running time: 42 minutes
- Production companies: True Entertainment; Kandi Koated Entertainment

Original release
- Network: Bravo
- Release: May 17 – June 7, 2015

Related
- The Real Housewives of Atlanta

Kandi's Ski Trip is an American reality television series that premiered on Bravo on May 17, 2015. It was developed as the fifth spin-off of The Real Housewives of Atlanta.

The show focuses on Kandi Burruss, her husband Todd Tucker and their blended family as they go on a ski trip together.

The series received relatively high ratings.

== Cast ==
=== Main ===
- Kandi Burruss
- Todd Tucker, Kandi's husband

=== Supporting ===
- Mama Joyce, Kandi's mother
- Aunt Bertha, Kandi's aunt
- Weenie, Kandi's cousin

== Episodes ==
No.	Title	Original release date	U.S. viewers (millions)
1	"Mending and Blending"	May 17, 2015	1.46
Newly married Kandi Buruss-Tucker and Todd Tucker decide to go on a vacation to Colorado together with their families in order to build better relationship.
2	"Trip Down Mending Lane"	May 31, 2015	1.64
Carmon and Kandi hash out their issues. Todd was blamed for Kandi's demeanor.
3	"A Family Affair"	June 7, 2015	1.66
The family spends their last days on their family trip in Colorado.

== International broadcast ==
In Australia, Kandi's Ski Trip premiered on Arena on August 2, 2015. In the United Kingdom, the reality series airs on ITVBe.
