= Watch What Crappens =

- Country of origin: United States
- Language: English

Creative team
- Created by: Ronnie Karam & Ben Mandelker

Cast and voices
- Hosted by: Ronnie Karam & Ben Mandelker

Production
- Length: 40-120 minutes

Publication
- No. of episodes: 2,814
- Original release: January 26, 2012
- Provider: Wondery

Related
- Website: www.watchwhatcrappens.com

Watch What Crappens is a podcast dedicated to all things Bravo, hosted by Ronnie Karam and Ben Mandelker. The two met as coworkers, and began the podcast after discovering their shared interest of the Bravo TV Network. The podcast primarily consists of the hosts narrating their annotated recaps of recently aired episodes of select Bravo shows (along with shows from other networks being recapped occasionally due to the host's interest). Both Ben & Ronnie have worked various jobs in the entertainment industry; Ben being the creator and editor of B-SideBlogs.com, The Banter Blender podcast, and the Game Brain podcast, while Ronnie was the Senior editor & writer at TrashTalkTv.com, and was previously a host on the Rose Pricks podcast. They also each had experience hosting the web series "Housewife Hoedown".

The start of the podcast also originally featured a third host, Matt Whitfield, who later left the show. In January 2023, it was announced that Watch What Crappens had signed a distribution deal with Wondery.

When the podcast began, episodes provided a more summary-based format of the shows aired by Bravo that week. As the show has evolved over time, new podcast episodes rarely cover more than one episode of a show at a time, with the hosts often going through the episode scene-by-scene with added comedic commentary, and voice impressions of the cast.

Podcast episodes are recorded and uploaded five days a week, along with exclusive weekly Bonus Episodes released via Patreon subscription, and biweekly "Crappy Hours" (once held on "Spotify Greenroom") in which Ben & Ronnie cover the most recent news pertaining to "Bravolebrities" or other pop culture news. Crappy Hour episodes stream live via the Watch What Crappens Youtube Channel on Monday evenings.

== The Golden Crappies ==
The podcast has hosted its own awards show titled "The Golden Crappies" annually, giving away awards such as "Best Bravolebrity", "Best Newbie", and "Best Bravo Show". The first annual Crappy Awards was held on January 3, 2013, which covered the shows aired by Bravo in the past year (2012). The following awards shows follow the same structure.

More recent additions of the annual Crappy Awards have also been held via telecast, and have opened the voting to the public, garnering over 18,000+ votes past years. In January 2022, the 10th Annual Golden Crappies also served as the kickoff to the Watch What Crappens 10th Anniversary "Hunky Dory" National Tour.

=== Awards ===
Winners are listed first and in bold.

2025 Golden Crappies
2025
**Best Bravo Show of the Year** **Real Housewives of Salt Lake City**: Real Housewives of Miami; Real Housewives of Orange County; The Valley; Summer House	**Bravolebrity of the Year** **Angie Katsanevas** (RHOSLC): Phaedra Parks (The Traitors) & Married to Medicine); Ariana Madix(Vanderpump Rules) & Love Island USA); Mary Cosby (RHOSLC); Paige DeSorbo (Summer House); Shannon Beador (RHOC)	**Best Supporting Character** **Jennifer Tilly** (RHOBH): Britani Bateman (RHOSLC); Norma Trease (Below Deck); Parvati's Headbands (Traitors); The Southwest Plane Flying Over James Kennedy's House (Vanderpump Rules); Zack's Hair (The Valley)	**Best Moment** **Mary Can't Figure Out How To Enter Meredith's Bat Mitzvah** (RHOSLC): Dorit Smoking in Her Car (RHOBH); Jen Goes Off On Tamra (RHOC); Margaret Sends Funeral Flowers to Teresa (RHONJ); Mary Cosby Breaks Through to Robert Jr. (RHOSLC); MJ Awkwardly Interrupts The Peter Pals and Slowly Backs Out of The Room (Traitors)
**Best Fight** **Mondrian Hallway Fight with Doute and The Lallys** (The Valley): Carl Wants Lindsay To Be Softer With Him (Summer House); Danielle Smashes a Cup on Jen's Head (RHONJ); Dolores Doesn't Like That Jackie Called Her a Slob (RHONJ); Maddie Locking Sammie Outside The House Party, Then Yelling At Her Through The Door, But Nobody Can Hear Her (Southern Hospitality)	**Best Villain** **John Janssen & Alexis Bellino** (RHOC): Jax Taylor (The Valley); Tamra Judge (RHOC); Tom Sandoval (Vanderpump Rules); Whitney Leavitt (SLOMW)	**Most Cringe** **Karen Huger's DUI Footage**: Tamra's Autism Announcement; Alexis Bellino Names Herself "Fun Lexi" (RHOC); RHONY Season 15; Seth says "Biatch!" at a Dinner (RHOSLC)	**Best Group Scene** **Meredith's Bat Mitzvah** (RHOSLC): Breakfast at Tiffany's Lunch (RHOSLC); Gondola Ride in Mexico (RHOM); Phaedra Reads Dan For Filth at the Round Table (Traitors); Shannon Beador's Birthday Lunch (RHOC)
**Biggest Fail** **Any Announcement by Britani Bateman** (RHOSLC): Any Announcement by Britani Bateman (RHOSLC); Lala's Season Finale Rant (Vanderpump Rules); Pregnancy Prank (RHONY); Tom Sandoval Redemption Arc (Vanderpump Rules); Schwartz & Sandy's (Vanderpump Rules)	**The Worst** **Larsa Pippen**	**Best Non-Housewives Show** **The Traitors**: Love Island USA; The Valley; Summer House; Secret Lives of Mormon Wives	**Best Newbie** **Bronwyn Newport** (RHOSLC): Bozoma Saint John (RHOBH); Jennifer Tilly (RHOBH); Britani Bateman (RHOSLC); Taylor Frankie Paul (SLOMW); Jesse Solomon (Summer House); Kyle Cook (The Traitors, Summer House)
**Most Chaotic** **Gondola Ride in Mexico** (RHOM): Bri Doing Laundry (Below Deck Mediterranean); Casa Amor Recoupling (Love Island USA); Jax & Kristen (The Valley); Rails Last Supper (RHONJ)	**Biggest Scandal** **Karen Huger's DUI**: Countess Luann, Joe Bradley, & Danielle Oliveira Love Triangle (Southern Hospitality); James Kennnedy's Arrest; John Janssen Sues Shannon Beador Over a Facelift (RHOC); Teddi Cheats on Edwin With Her Horse Trainer	**Best Quote** **"High Body Count Hair" - Angie Katsanevas** (RHOSLC): "But You Do Need Kerastase Thermitique" - Lisa Barlow (RHOSLC); "CEO & Founder of What?" - Paige DeSorbo (Summer House); "I Do Too Much Because You Do Too Little" - Phaedra Parks (Traitors); "Oh, You're a TV Star!" - Shannon Beador (RHOC); "Thank the Lord, She Took Them Bangs With Her" - Mary Cosby (RHOSLC)	
**Non Tele-Cast Awards**: 1. Emotion Most Felt by Gina Kirschenheiter (RHOC) - **Bad**; 2. Most Existential Question for 2025 - **"How Can MomTok Survive This?"**; 3. Most Exotic Bravo Vacation - **RHOSLC Cast Goes to Milwaukee**; 4. Best Furniture - **Rebecca Minkoff's Virginity Bed**; 5. Best Reason to Ban Clubs - **Club Send It (Summer House)**; 6. Best Legal Announcement - **"You Subpeonad the Wrong Bitch" (Margaret Josephs)**; 7. Worst Thing to Discover on TV - **that Ariana's totally gonna be on DWTS and I didn't even know, and she knows how much I wanted that"**(Scheana, Vanderpump Rules); 8. Outstanding Achievement in Cinematography - **Britani Bateman** (RHOSLC); 9. Outstanding Achievement in Hug Direction - **Carl Radke for "Hug Me Harder"** (Summer House); 10. Outstanding Achievement in Animal Welfare - **Lisa Hochstein Throwing Chicken at Dogs in Mexico** (RHOM); 11. Most Heartwarming Storyline - **Sara's Housekeeper Tries To Abduct Her Son and Winds Up Getting Deported** (RHODUB); 12. Most Terrified Cast Member - **The Deer on** RHOP; 13. Outstanding Achievement in Food Criticism - **Lisa Barlow Declaring the Food in Italy is "Too Fresh"** (RHOSLC)

2024 Golden Crappies
2024
**Best Bravo Show of the Year** **Real Housewives of Salt Lake City**: Real Housewives of Beverly Hills; Real Housewives of Miami; Real Housewives Ultimate Girls Trip: RHONY Legacy; Vanderpump Rules	**Bravolebrity of the Year** **Ariana Madix** (VPR): Aesha Scott (Below Deck); Heather Gay (RHOSLC); Jessel Taank (RHONY); Sutton Stracke (RHOBH)	**Best Supporting Character** **Kiki Barth** (RHOM): Britani Bateman (RHOSLC); Norma Trease (Below Deck); Pavit (RHONY); Pavit's Banh Mi (RHONY); Pepsi (RHUGT)	**Best Moment** **Season Finale Dinner** (RHOSLC): Captain Jason & Aesha on Below Deck Down Under; Mary Cosby Confirms That Heather Gay Looks Inbred (RHOSLC); Meredith Asking a Random Waiter To Remove People From Her Dinner Party (RHOSLC); Monica Cries That She Bought a Louis Vuitton Bag to Fit In (RHOSLC)
**Best Fight** **Heather Confronts Monica about Reality Von Tease** (RHOSLC): Danielle & Lindsay Fall Out (Summer House); Esophagus Fight (RHOBH); Scheana, Katie, & The Hotel Room in Mexico (Vanderpump Rules); Taco Tuesday	**Best Villain** **Tom Sandoval** (Vanderpump Rules): Austin Kroll (Southern Charm); Larsa Pippen (RHOM & The Traitors); Monica's Mother, Linda (RHOSLC); Monica (RHOSLC)	**Most Cringe** **Danielle Olivera** (Winter House & Summer House): Gary Demands to Know if Madison Is On Her Period (Below Deck Mediterranean); Kyle Tattoos a "K" on Morgan Wade's Body (RHOBH); Larsa Outs Guerdy's Cancer Diagnosis (RHOM); Louie Wearing Nono's Pajamas to Comfort Teresa's Daughters (RHONJ)	**Biggest Fail** **The Reality Reckoning**: Denise's Upside Down Jacket (RHOBH); Erin & Sai Trying to Make Jessel the Victim (RHONY); Whitney's Exploited Vagina (RHOSLC); "Who Wants to Play a Game?" (Any Show)
**Best Newbie** **Jessel Taank** (RHONY): Angie Katsanevas (RHOSLC); Jenna Lyons (RHONY); Monica Garcia (RHOSLC); (Married to Medicine & The Traitors)	**Biggest Fuck Boy** **Austin Kroll** (Southern Charm): Gary King (Below Deck Sailing); Kory Keefer (Winter House & Summer House); Luca (Below Deck); Tom Sandoval (Vanderpump Rules)	**Best Musical Scoring** **Whitney Sets a Table While Bobby Does Her Homework at the Counter** (RHOSLC): RHOC Opening Credits, DJ Maddie Reese 2023 Remix; Craig Walks Down the Street & Almost Passes By the Store He Meant to Go Into, But Then He Finds the Door & It's Super Funny (Southern Charm); Heather Has News: Her Starbucks Card Needs Refilling (RHOSLC); The Women Order Poached Salmon (RHOBH); Garcelle Orders Poached Salmon (RHOBH)	**Best Quote** **"The Rumors & The Nastiness, You Can Leave!" - Meredith Marks** (RHOSLC): "Receipts, Proof, Timeline, Screenshots" - Heather Gay (RHOSLC); "Name Em" - Sutton Stracke (RHOBH); "You're a Worm With a Mustache" - James Kennedy (Vanderpump Rules); 'do you need anything?', "For You To Die" - Ariana Madix (Vanderpump Rules)
**Biggest Scandal** **Scandoval** (Vanderpump Rules): Girls Trip Season on Pause After Caroline Manzo Accuses Brandi Glanville of Unwanted Kisses (RHUGT); Kyle & Mauricio Split Amidst Morgan Wade Rumors (RHOBH); Reality Von Tease (RHOSLC); Shannon Gets a DUI (RHOC)		**Most Memorable Scandoval Moment** **Scheana Explains That She Couldn't Have Hit Raquel Because it's Scientifically Impossible For Her to Form a Fist With Her Nails**: Ariana's Revenge Dress; James Gets Water in His Eyes, Yells "Ally!" & Trips and Falls As He Runs to the Bathroom; Sandoval Saying Raquel "Dipped Out" When In Fact They Were Banging While Ariana Was at Her Grandmother's Funeral; Tom & Tom Mess Up Their Timelines at the Reunion	
**Non Tele-Cast Awards**: 1. Outstanding Achievement in Bobway - **Joao Franco (Below Deck Mediterranean)**; 2. Recognition of Strength In The Face of Adversity - **Lisa Hochstein (RHOM)**; 3. Best Example of Why Joseph Smith Doesn't Allow Caffeine - **Soda Drunk Bobby (RHOSLC)**; 4. Best Funeral for a Non-Dead Cast Member - **Quad's Funeral (Married to Medicine)**; 5. Most Terrible Patterns Worn By One Human Being in The Past 20 Years - **Gail Simmons (Top Chef)**; 6. Greta Thunberg Eco Award - **For Generating Solar Power Through Her Sunglasses, Angie Katsanevas (RHOSLC)**; 7. Excellence in Being Thin Without Ozempic - **Heather Dubrow's IMDb Credits**; 8. Excellence in Tagline Insanity - **Karen Huger for Insisting She's a Fence & We Must Ride Her (RHOP)**; 9. Best Performance by Foliage - **The Plant Monica's Mother Talked To In a Restaurant (RHOSLC)**; 10. International Trip That Caused America the Most Shame - **RHONJ in Ireland**; 11. Excellence in Purple Facial Effects - **Louie (RHONJ)**; 12. Best Penmanship - **Marysol Patton's Liver (RHOM)**; 13. Outstanding Achievement in Being One of The Only Cast Members Not to Make Out with Austin Kroll - **Patricia Altschul (Southern Charm)**; 14. Bill & Melinda Gates Philanthropic Man of the Year Award - **For Providing Hotel Rooms & Detergent to the Needy, Juan Dixon (RHOP)**; 15. Best Chemistry - **Olivia & Rod (Southern Charm)** tied with **Louie & Bodeedle** **(RHONJ)**; 16. Best Wolf - **Boogawolf (RHONJ)**; 17. Outstanding Achievement for "I Think Being Right There, I Think That is Him" - **John Janssen's Son (RHOC)**; 18. Outstanding Achievement for "Ah, Actually it Was Someone Else" - **John Janssen's Son (RHOC)**; 19. Lifetime Achievement in Being A Slut Who Can't Do Her Job - **Norma Trease (Below Deck)**; 20. Lifetime Achievement for Fighting Off Pirates Just By Telling Them Really Boring Stories - **Captain Sandy (Below Deck)**; 21. Outstanding Achievement in Making People Shake in Their Boots Without Even Being On a Yacht - **Kate Chastain (Below Deck) & The Traitors)**; 22. Best New Crappens Listener - **Lisa Vanderpump** **(RHOBH)**

2023 Golden Crappies
2023
**Best Bravo Show of the Year** **Real Housewives of Miami**: Family Karma; Real Girlfriends in Paris; Real Housewives of Beverly Hills; Real Housewives of New Jersey; Real Housewives of Potomac; RHUGT: The Berkshires		**Bravolebrity of the Year** **Garcelle Beauvais** (RHOBH): Candiace Dillard-Basset (RHOP); Chanel Ayan (RHODub); Dr. Nicole Martin (RHOM); Grace Lilly (Southern Charm); Karen Huger (RHOP); Lisa Barlow (RHOSLC); Margaret Josephs (RHONJ); Quad Webb (Married To Medicine); Shannon Beador (RHOC)	**Best Friend-Of** or **Family Member** **Kathy Hilton** (RHOBH): Kiki Barth (RHOM); Adriana De Moura (RHOM); Audra Frimprong (Married to Medicine); Cherise Jackson Jordan (RHOP); Jamie Lee Curtis (RHOBH); Martina Navratilova (RHOM); Olivia Aydin (RHONJ); Patricia Altschul (Southern Charm); Richard Marx (RHOC); Yoanne (RGIP)
**Biggest Villain** **Lenny Hochstein** (RHOM): All the Men on Southern Charm; Ashley (Below Deck Sailing Yacht); Camille (Below Deck); Diana Jenkins (RHOBH); Erika Jayne (RHOBH); Jen Shah (RHOSLC); Lisa Rinna (RHOBH); Lindsay Hubbard (Summer House)	**Best New Show** **Southern Hospitality**: Below Deck Adventure; Below Deck Down Under; Kandi & The Gang; Real Girlfriends in Paris; Real Housewives of Dubai	**Best Fight** **Kathy vs. Rinna at the Reunion** (RHOBH): Jizz for Jazz/ Lingerie Fight (RHOSLC); Ciara vs. Danielle On Italian Night (Summer House); Contessa-led Movie Theater Intervention for Heavenly While She Cackled (Married to Medicine); Erika vs. Everyone In Aspen (RHOBH); Heather Accuses Noella of Giving Her Daughter Porn (RHOC); Mia Throwing a Drink at Wendy (RHOP); Victoria Throws Wine at Yoanne and Dumps Fries On His Head (RGIP)	**Most Cringe** **Erika curses out Garcelle's son** (RHOBH): Every Interaction Between Dave & Natasha (Below Deck Med); Kyle Flirting With Frank On the Charter (Below Deck); Lenny's Hot Mic Moment (RHOM); Louie's Love Scroll for Teresa (RHONJ); Lisa Rinna Claims She'll Get Cancer & Die if She Doesn't Call Out Kathy (RHOBH); Shep Calls Taylor an Idiot (Southern Charm); Sutton Brushes Off Dorit Being Held at Gunpoint (RHOBH)
**Biggest Fail** **Heather's Black Eye** (RHOSLC): Anila Accusing Toya of Masterminding The Robbery of Her House (Married to Medicine); Austin's Romance With Oliva (Southern Charm); Dick Touch Gate (Winter House); Erika & Rinna Deny Their Press Leaks (RHOBH); Giselle & Ashley Try to Take Down Chris (RHOP); Casey Gets Kicked Out of France (RGIP); Catherine's Meatballs (Southern Charm); Producers Missing Kathy Hilton's Meltdown (RHOBH); The Friends-Of on RHOSLC; Vishal On His Wedding Night (Family Karma)		**Best Moment** **Homeless Not Toothless Dinner Party** (RHOBH): Phaedra Parks Thinking Dorinda Medley Could Be Brandi Glanville's Mother On RHUGT Season 2; Alexia Learns About Scrolling (RHOM); Alexia's Lawyer Friend Tries to Offer Advice (RHOM); Chanel Ayan Wears a Couture Gown to an Ethiopian Restaurant (RHODub); Dorit complimenting Jaime Lee Curtis' Chic Windchime (RHOBH); Dr. Jen & Ryan at the Dubrow's Dinner Party (RHOC); Dr. Nicole's Mirror Disinvitation of Larsa Pippen (RHOM); Marilyn Monroe Dinner (RHOSLC); Lisa Tells the Group That Lenny Wants a Divorce and the Group Breaks Into Screams (RHOM); Kyle Yells At His Roommates and Then Cries in Someone's Yard (Summer House)	
**Best Captain** **Captain Lee** (Below Deck)	**Best Yachtie** **Aesha Scott** (Below Deck Down Under)	**Best Musical Performance** **"Away in a Manger" - Lisa Barlow** (RHOSLC): "Insecure" - Candiace ft. Trina (RHOP); "O, Holy Night" - Asher Monroe ft. Erika Jayne; "Whatever I Want" (RHOC); "Right Here Waiting" - Richard Marx (RHOC)	**Best Newbie** **Chanel Ayan** (RHODub): Adja (RGIP); Anya Firestone (RGIP); Faye Clark (Below Deck); Grace Lilly (Southern Hospitality); Maya Allen (Summer House); Sonja Richards-Ross (RHOA)
**Best Quote** **"Not today Satan. Not today neck. Not today ankles!" - Candiace Dillard-Basset** (RHOP): "We Have To Call 911, I'm Telling You" - Alexia Finding Out That Lenny Has a Girlfriend in Lisa's Home (RHOM); "You Look Like Goddamn Celine Dion" - Austin Kroll (Southern Charm); "Period. Dot." - Chanel Ayan (RHODub); "You Need a New Villain? Here I Am" - Diana Jenkins (RHOBH); "I Don't Have to Make You Look Bad, You Do That All On Your Own" - Garcelle Beauvais (RHOBH); "Fudge College, Honestly" - Jack Barlow (RHOSLC); "Bitch, I'm Worldwide - Kandi Burress (RHOA); "I;ve Worked With the Homeless, I've Worked With the Toothless - Kathy Hilton (RHOBH); "You're the Biggest Bully in Hollywood & Everyone Knows It" - Kathy Hilton (RHOBH); "Did Ya Say Somethin Dave?" - Natasha & Dave (Below Deck Med); "If I Die Now, Tell Them, She Died Sad" - Vicki Gunvalson (RHOC); "I'm On a Hilling Journey" - Whitney Rose (RHOSLC); "I'm Dairy Free" Monologue - Grace Lilly (Southern Hospitality)			**Outstanding Achievement in Business** **Homeless Not Toothless** (RHOBH): Kathy Hilton's Casa Del Sol Tequila (RHOBH); Chloe Colette (RGIP); Drop It With Drew (RHOP); Emily's Curtain Business (RGIP); Heather's Choir (RHOSLC); LeArchive by Marlo Hampton (RHOA); Maya's Cookies (Summer House); Nina's Fruitcakes (RHODub); Republic DMG (Southern Hospitality); She by Sheree (RHOA); Slip Dresses (RGIP)
**Non Tele-Cast Awards**: 1. Worst Social Media Decision - **Kyle Richards for Trying To Take On Reza** & **Lisa Rinna for Trying To Take On Patrick**; 2. Best Non-Eagle Eagle - **Olivia Aydin (RHONJ)**; 3. Most Interesting Hat Store - **Kemo Sabe (RHOBH)**; 4. Least Interesting Hat Store - **Embellished by Robyn Dixon (RHOP)**; 5. Best Use of a Depression Scrunchie - **Jennifer Aydin**; 6. The Best Not-Ever-Fucking-Anybody Fuck Boy - **Joey Marbles (Southern Hospitality)**; 7. Outstanding Use of Snickers Creamer in a Dramatic Scene - **Margaret Josephs** **(RHONJ)**; 8. Best Fly - **Tenafly (RHONJ)**; 9. Best Non-Cocaine Use of a Mirror - **Dr. Nicole's Mirror Disinvitation (RHOM)**; 10. Worst Non-Cocaine Use of a Mirror - **Chef Dave's Mirror Glaze (Top Chef)**; 11. Best College - **Fudge College (RHOSLC)**; 12. Most In Need of College - **Sergio for Not Understanding How Babies are Made (RHODub)**; 13. Outstanding Achievement in Geolocating - **Joe Gorga (RHONJ)**; 14. Most Delicious Prop During a Fight - **Kiki's Whopper (RHOM)**; 15. Most Technological Prop During a Fight - **Robin's Bluetooth Speaker (RHOP)**; 16. Most Able to Hire Cleaning Ladies Because He Comes From a Family of Cleaning People So Shut Up - **Craig Conover (Southern Charm)**; 17. Outstanding Achievement for Not Giving a Fuck - **Kate Chastain (The Traitors)**; 18. Best Number - **5 & 9 (RHOP)**; 19. Outstanding Achievement in Gaydar - **Brandi Glanville for Spotting Lesbians From Their Eyebrows (RHUGT)**; 20. Most Moisturized - **Diana Jenkins' Lips**; 21. Best Gravy - **Wavy**; 22. Worst Place for a Toe - **Seth Marks' Taint**; 23. Outstanding Achievement in Chicken Slander - **Karen Huger for "Dirty Bird" (RHOP)**; 24. Outstanding Achievement in Foot Slander - **Adriana De Moura (RHOM)**; 25. Most Immediate Karma - **Ronnie Karam** for Making Fun of Adriana's Foot Over & Over, And Then Injuring My Own Foot; 26. Outstanding Achievement in Slander Slander - **Erika Jayne (RHOBH)**; 27. Most Adorable Use of "AWHR" - **Aesha Scott (Below Deck Down Under)**; 28. Best Comeback - **Phaedra Parks (RHUGT)**

2022 Golden Crappies
2022
**Best Bravo Show** **Real Housewives of Salt Lake City**: Below Deck Sailing Yacht; Real Housewives of Beverly Hills; Real Housewives of Miami; Real Housewives of New Jersey; Real Housewives of Potomac; Real Housewives of Orange County; Real Housewives Ultimate Girls Trip; Shahs of Sunset; Summer House	**Bravolebrity of the Year** **Sutton Stracke (RHOBH)**: Alexia Nepola (RHOM); Garcelle Beauvais (RHOBH); Karen Huger (RHOP); Heather Gay (RHOSLC); Lisa Barlow (RHOSLC); Margaret Josephs (RHONJ); Paige DeSorbo (Summer House); Lindsay Hubbard (Summer House)	**Best Friend-Of** or **Family Member** **Kathy Hilton** **(RHOBH)**: Adriana De Moura (RHOM); Angie Harrington (RHOSLC); Bershan Shah (RHONY); Bolo (RHOA); Grace, Adore & Angel Bryant (RHOP); Carlin; Lopa (Family Karma); P.K. & Mauricio (RHOBH); Olivia Aydin (RHONJ); Martina Navratilova (RHOM)	**Best Supporting Role****Sutton's Face Roller** (RHOBH): Analogies (RHONJ); Bolo's Big Dick Pixelation (RHOA); Crystal's Leather Pants (RHOBH); Erika's Runny Mascara (RHOBH); Happy & Ness (RHOP); Hot Toddy; Lamb Curry (RHONY); Marge's Iced Coffee (RHONJ); Stravy's Crate Desk (Summer House)
**Best Moment** **Jen Shah Arrested Outside of Beauty Lab & Laser** (RHOSLC): Erika Jayne Cries (RHOBH); Erika's Monologue About Tom's Car Crash (RHOBH); Ariana Mocks Lala (VPR); Karen Huger Films a Promo Video For Surrey County, Not in Surrey (RHOP); Amrit Comes Out to His Grandmother Family Karma; Lindsay Wants a Goddamn Sandwich (Summer House); Meredith Marks Soaks in Her Bathtub (RHOSLC); Nicki Minaj Shows Up to RHOP Reunion; Reasonably Shady Party (RHOP); Sonja Loses Her Mind Over Wells Fargo (RHONY)		**Most Cringe** **Black Shabbat**(RHONY): Barry & Family (Below Deck: Sailing Yacht); Hannah & Des (Summer House); Heather Thompson Tells Ebony She's Articulate & Luanne Tells Her She's Angry (RHONY); Jennifer Suggests Margaret Slept With Her Boss to Get Ahead (RHONJ); Cameron & Court Wescot vs. Dr. Tiffany Moon (Married to Medicine); Kelly Dodd Says She's Black (RHOC); Kenya Wears an Indigenous Headdress (RHOA); Louie's Card to Teresa (RHONJ); Mary Talks About a Congregant Falling Out of a Plane Into a Neighborhood & Dying, in Front of Whitney's Daughter(RHOSLC)	
**Best Villain** **Erika Jayne** (RHOBH): Candiace Dillard-Basset (RHOP); Hannah Berner (Summer House); Heather Dubrow (RHOC); Jean-Luc Cerza Lanaux (Below Deck Sailing Yacht); Jen Shah (RHOSLC); Kary Brittingham (RHOD); Mary M. Cosby (RHOSLC); Ramona Singer (RHONY)	**Best Non-Housewives Show** **Summer House**: Below Deck Sailing Yacht; Family Karma; Shahs of Sunset; Top Chef; Winter House	**Biggest Mess** **RHONY Non-Reunion**: "Drive Back" Parking Lot Video Shoot (RHOP); Alexia Arranges to Meet With Her Dead Husband's Muscle Top Lover (RHOM; Captain Glen Crashes Into a Deck (Below Deck); Cynthia's Bachelorette Party (RHOA); Gary, Sidney, Ally Love Triangle (Below Deck Sailing Yacht); Jennifer Aydin (RHONJ); Luann's Christmas Song Video Shoot (RHONY); Meghan King Edmonds' Two Month Marriage to the President's Nephew; Sonja Morgan (RHONY)	
**Best Newbie** **Dr. Tiffany Moon(Married to Medicine)**: Guerdy (RHOM); Jennie Nguyen (RHOSLC); Noella (RHOC); Mia Thornton (RHOP)	**Biggest Mess** **RHONY Non-Reunion**: "Drive Back" Parking Lot Video Shoot (RHOP); Alexia Arranges to Meet With Her Dead Husband's Muscle Top Lover (RHOM; Captain Glen Crashes Into a Deck (Below Deck); Cynthia's Bachelorette Party (RHOA); Gary, Sidney, Ally Love Triangle (Below Deck Sailing Yacht); Jennifer Aydin (RHONJ); Luann's Christmas Song Video Shoot (RHONY); Meghan King Edmonds' Two Month Marriage to the President's Nephew; Sonja Morgan (RHONY)		**Outstanding Achievement in Business** **Beauty Lab & Laser** (RHOSLC): Dorit & Nectaria Wedding Dresses (RHOBH); Fresh Wolf (RHOSLC); 3 Wick Candles by Karen (RHOP); Carrie's Trunk Show; Lover Boy (Summer House); Schwartz & Sandy's (VPR); The Joint Chiropractic (RHOP)
**Best Quote** **"Who is Honky Dory?" - Kathy Hilton (RHOBH)**: "Orphans & Widows! It just makes you sick" - Dorit Kemsley (RHOBH); "Or What?" - Erika Jayne (RHOBH); "If You Ever Come For Me & My Family Again, You Are Going to Lose A Lot More Than Just My Friendship..." - Heather Dubrow (RHOC); "Gia Snorts Coke in the Bathroom at Parties" - Jackie Goldschneider (RHONJ); "You're a Broken Whore From Hampton University and Everyone Knows It" - Karen Huger (RHOP); "I Don't Know What You've Heard About Me, But Everything is True!" - Kenya Moore (RHOA); "How Many Sandwiches Have You Made Me?!" - Lindsay Hubbard (Summer House); "Hi Baby Gorgeous!" - Lisa Barlow (RHOSLC); "Oh bitch, that bitch, fuck that bitch" - Luanne de Lesseps (RHONY); "I Don't Like You" - Luke Gulbranson (Summer House); "Shut Your Muppet Mouth" - Madison Lecroy (Summer House); "You Can Go Now, Little Girl!" - Mary M. Cosby (RHOSLC); "I Am Sick of the Projecting, Deflecting, & Lying" - Meredith Marks (RHOSLC); "Paulina!" - Mike Shouhed (Shahs of Sunset)		**Non Tele-Cast Awards**: 1. Biggest Lie Centered on Pita Bread - **"There are 20 Pitas in the Basket"**; 2. Most Storylines Happening At One Time to One Fucking Person - **Alexia Echevarria (RHOM)**; 3. Worst Judgement - for being into Austin, **Ciara (Summer House)**; 4. Best Alphabet Letter of 2021 - **G!**; 5. Most Passive Aggressive Condiment - **Harry's Tomato Sauce (RHOBH)**; 6. Most Haunting Moment of the Year - **Heather & Terry Dubrow's Laughing**; 7. Outstanding Repurposing of a Muppet - **Meredith Marks' Sleeves (RHOSLC)**; 8. Most Talented Gulag Escapee Turned Chef - **Dushka (Below Deck Med)**; 9. Thinnest Storyline - **Reza for "I Just Want to Meet Baby Shams" (Shahs of Sunset)**; 10. Worst Person to Run Into at a Sex Party - **Matt the Chef (Below Deck Med)**; 11. Most Likely to Ruin Sex Parties as a Concept - **Matt the Chef (Below Deck Med)**; 12. Outstanding Achievement in Causing Nose Jobs - **Michael Myers (RHOBH)**; 13. Best Person to Thank Randomly to Show How Famous You Are - **Ali Wong**; 14. Sport Most in Need of Dying - **Pickleball**; 15. Best Jersey Food Fusion - **Pizza Bagels**; 16. Outstanding Achievement in Religious Leadership - **Prophet Lot & Mary Cosby**; 17. Best Adaption to COVID-19 - **Sonja Morgan Drinking Th**rough Her Mask; 18. Outstanding Achievement in Encapsulating All Our Fears About the Legal System - **Shane Simpson for Failing the Bar Multiple Times but Passing Anyway (RHOC)**; 19. Outstanding Triumph Over Outer Darkness & Bolero Jackets - **Heather Gay**	

2021 Golden Crappies
2021
**Best Bravo Show** **Real Housewives of New York**: Family Karma; Real Housewives of New Jersey; Real Housewives of New Jersey; Real Housewives of Potomac; Summer House; Top Chef: All Stars		**Best Friend-Of** **Sutton Stracke (RHOBH)**: Camille Grammar (RHOBH); Elyse Laine (RHONY); Marlo Hampton (RHOA); Martin the Boxer (RHONY); Tanya Sam (RHOA)
**Most Uncomfortable Romance** **Mary & Her Husband/Grandfather** (RHOSLC): Adam & Jenna (Below Deck Sailing Yacht); Bronwyn & Sean (RHOC); Destiny & Sam (Shahs of Sunset); Elizabeth & Jimmy (RHOC); Jessica & Rob (Below Deck Med); Kelly & Rick (RHOC); Mark & Kenya (RHOA)	**Best Scandal** **Dorinda Yelling at John, Unseen Footage** (RHONY): Brandi Glanville Hooking Up w Denise Richards (RHOBH); Jackie Only Offering Pizza at Her Son's Birthday (RHONJ); Malia Reporting Hannah to Captain Sandy (Below Deck Med); Michael Darby Gets Caught in His Underwear in a Hotel Room (RHOP); Teresa Setting Danielle Up to Attack Marge (RHONJ); Kyle Richards Getting Bangs (RHOBH)	**Best Family Member** **Patricia Altschul** (Southern Charm): Bill Aydin (RHONJ); The Aunties (Family Karma); Baby Dean (RHOP); Dale Mercer (RHONY); Dorinda's Sister Melinda (RHONY); Dr. Imani's Mom (Married to Medicine); Marge Sr. (RHONJ)
**Thirstiest Bravolebrity of the Year** **Brandi Glanville** (RHOBH): Cynthia Bailey & Mike Hill a.k.a. "Chahill" (RHOA); Jasmine Johnson (Married to Medicine L.A.); Jen Shah (RHOSLC); Jennifer Aydin (RHONJ); Jules (Summer House); Jordan (Summer House); Mini Vegas Scheana (VPR)	**Best Fight** **Monique vs. Candiace (RHOP)**: All of the Women vs. Denise (RHOBH); Chef Tom vs The Cucumbers (Below Deck Med); Dorinda Blames Luann For Calling Her an Alcoholic Even Though it Was Ramona (RHONY); Danielle Staub vs. Marge's Ponytail (RHONJ); Hospital Smell Fight (RHOSLC); Tommy vs. Terracotta Planters (Shahs of Sunset); Luann Dropping Sonja From Her Cabaret (RHONY); Nene & Kenya in Toronto (RHOA)	**Best Moment** **Monique Reads Giselle From Her Binder** (RHOP): Andy Mutes People on Zoom; Kate Chastain Flips Off Cameras & Slams Door Behind Her (Below Deck); Lisa Vanderpump Tells Jax it's Her Show (VPR); Shannon Gets Wasted at Newly Sobered Bronwyn's Vow Renewal (RHOC); Sutton Calls Teddi Boring (RHOBH); T'Challa Attacks Wendy (RHOP); Tanya Brings Kenya's Wig to the Korean Spa (RHOA); Tom's Breakdown Over Potatoes (Below Deck Med)
**Best Quote** **"Bravo, Bravo, Fucking Bravo" - Denise Richards (RHOBH)**: "Can I Touch??" - Lisa Barlow (RHOSLC); "Do your food, yeah" - Captain Sandy (Below Deck Med); "Do Not Activate Me, You Don't Want to See Me Activated" - Lindsay Hubbard (Summer House); "Exacto" - Padma Lakshmi (Top Chef: All Stars); "I Am So Glad Juan Dixon Isn't Here Right Now" - Robyn Dixon (RHOP); "I Don't Wear Masks in the Ocean!" - Ramona Singer (RHONY); "Let the Mouse Go" - Sutton Stracke (RHOBH); "Ragamuffin" - Kyle Richards (RHOBH); "Pastor Holy Whore" - Monique Samuels (RHOP); "There's a Vibrator in the Chicken" - Leah McSweeney (RHONY); "You Look Great By the Way" - Carl Radke (Summer House); "Ooh, You're So Angry" - Lisa Rinna (RHOBH)		**Best RHONY Moment** **Leah Hurls a Ravioli at Ramona While a Gay Sips a Martini in the Corner**: Dorinda Freaks Out About Tinsley at the Finale Party; Dorinda Imitates Luann's Happy Birthday Addiction; Leah Throws Tiki Torches; Luann Survives a Night in Ramona's Spider Filled Basement; Ramona Celebrates Her Birthday With 50 of Her Closest Friends; Ramona Wants Somebody to Hold Her, to Love Her, to Want Her, and to Be With Her; Sonja Gets Wasted on Halloween; Sonja Hits on Young Hipsters at Leah's Party
**Best Newbie** **Leah McSweeney** **(RHOSLC)**: Charli Burnett (VPR); Elizabeth Vargus (RHOC); Garcelle Beauvais (RHOBH); John Pringle (Southern Charm); Leva (Southern Charm); Luke Gulbranson (Summer House); Wendy Osefo (RHOP)	**Outstanding Musical Achievement** **"Viva La Diva" - Luann De Lesseps** (RHONY): "Breathe You In" - Georgia (Below Deck); "Drag Queen" - Monique Samuels(RHOP); "I See You" Remix - Candiace Dillard-Basset (RHOP); Freeform "Coyote" Song - Luke Gulbranson (Summer House)	**Best Non-Bravo Show** **Selling Sunset**: Emily in Paris; Taste the Nation; The Great British Bake-Off; Tiger King

2020 Golden Crappies
2020
**Best Bravo Show** **Real Housewives of New York**: Below Deck; Below Deck Mediterranean; Real Housewives of New Jersey; Real Housewives of Potomac; Summer House	**Best Bravolebrity** **Kate Chastain (Below Deck)**: Dr. Heavenly (Married to Medicine); Giselle Bryant (RHOP); Kameron Westcott (RHOD); Kelly Dodd (RHOC); Kristen Doute (Vanderpump Rules); Lisa Vanderpump (RHOBH); Porsha Williams (RHOA); Sonja Morgan (RHONY); Stephanie Hollman (RHOD)	**Best Friend-Of** **Camille Grammar (RHOBH)**: Buffy Purcell (Married to Medicine); Danielle Staub (RHONJ); Madison LeCroy(Southern Charm); Marlo Hampton (RHOA); Tanya Sam (RHOA); Rachel (Southern Charm: New Orleans)	**Best Show Bravo Should Keep Alive** **Southern Charm: New Orleans**: Get a Room with Carson & Thom; Married to Medicine: Los Angeles; Mexican Dynasties; Texicanas
**Most Touching Moment** **Dorinda Sending a Tyler Perry Quote to Luann** (RHONY): The Cast of RHOBH Visits a Normal Grocery Store for the First Time in Their Lives; Melania Performs "I Don't Wanna Grow Up" (RHONJ); Padma Lakshmi Makes Fake Girl Deliver a Box of Food to Real Girl (Top Chef); Raquel Never Got Ice Cream Because of Math (Vanderpump Rules); Scheana Adopting a Penguin for Adam (Vanderpump Rules); Michael Touches a Cameraman's Butt (RHOP)	**Best Cameo Appearance** **Cathy the MC from OC Fashion Week (RHOC)**: Aya, The Japanese Tour Guide Who Hates Tardiness (RHOA); Brandi the Super Drunk Guest (Below Deck); Lori Cooper, Dorinda's Realtor (RHONY); Master Pearson (Below Deck); Patricia's Bodyguard (Southern Charm); Tej/Taj (RHONY)	**Best Fight** **Everyone Attacks Luann in Miami (RHONY)**: Camille Puts All of Dorit's Business Out There (RHOBH); Candiace Threatens Ashley with a Butter Knife (RHOP); Kameron Calls Brandi Trash in Mexico (RHOD); Karen Huger Yells "Clinkity Clink" (RHOP); Kelly Dodd vs. The Tres Amigas in Miraval & Key West (RHOC); Lisa Vanderpump & Kyle Richards vs. Their Friendship (RHOBH); Riley Requests a Paleo Option (Below Deck); Nene Leakes Goes Nuclear Over Her Closet (RHOA); RHONJ Cast Gets Into a Fight at Cabo San Lucas	
**Best Newbie** **Aesha Scott (Below Deck Med)**: Beau Clark (Vanderpump Rules); Braunwyn Windham-Burke (RHOC); Christian Siriano (Project Runway); Courtney Skippone(Below Deck); Denise Richards (RHOBH); Hannah Berner(Summer House); Paige DeSorbo (Summer House)	**Best Mom** **Collie's Mom** (Below Deck Mediterranean): Dorothy Dillard (RHOP); Marge Sr. (RHONJ); Dale Mercer (RHONY); Dee Simmons (RHOD); Patricia Altschul (Southern Charm)	**Best Villain** **LeeAnne Locken** (RHOD): Candiace Dillard (RHOP); Katie Maloney (Vanderpump Rules); Kenya Moore (RHOA); Tamra Judge (RHOC); Shep Rose (Southern Charm)	**The Worst** **Ashton** (Below Deck): Chef Mila (Below Deck Med); Everyone on Vanderpump Rules Getting Along; Garo Sparo (Project Runway); Nene Leakes (RHOA); Kyle Richards (RHOBH); Shane Simpson (RHOC); Teddi Mellencamp (RHOBH)
**Worst Storyline** **Tamra's Son Ryan is Sad** (RHOC): Couple's Trip (Married to Medicine); Babies (RHOA); Brittany's Engagement to Jax (Vanderpump Rules); Danielle Getting the D (Summer House); Does Cameron Need a Nanny? (Southern Charm); Lisa Vanderpump's Kitchen Makeover (RHOBH); Lucy Lucy Apple Juicey (RHOBH)	**Least Successful 2.0 or 3.0 Version of Someone** **Jason Cauchi** (Vanderpump Rules): Carl Radke (Summer House); Craig Conover (Southern Charm); Kelly Dodd (RHOC); LeeAnne Locken (RHOD); Nene Leakes (RHOA); Tamica Lee (Southern Charm)	**Most Memorable Reunion Performance** **Vicki Gunvalson**(RHOC): Kelly Dodd (RHOC); Nene Leakes (RHOA); James Kennedy (Vanderpump Rules); Camille Grammar (RHOBH)	**Best Show Bravo Should Keep Alive** **Southern Charm: New Orleans**: Get a Room with Carson & Thom; Married to Medicine: Los Angeles; Mexican Dynasties; Texicanas
**Best Gift from Bravo** **"Goodbye, Kyle" (RHOBH)**: Bravo Making Tinsley Cry at the Circus in Baby Doll Makeup (RHONY); Everything That Came Out of Jordan's Mouth (Summer House); Joe Giudice's Prison Interview (WWHL); Cameron Westcott Draws a Diagram of her Visit to a Ping Pong Show in Thailand (RHOD); Kelly Dodd Giving Shannon Beador a Mild Concussion (RHOC); Kristen Falls Over in a Hotel Lobby After Eating a Flower From a Traffic Median (VPR); Marge Throws Marty in the Pool(RHONJ); Secret Video of Austin Getting Caught in a Three-way (Southern Charm); The Fish Room (RHONY)		**Best RHONY Moment** **"You Don't Touch the Morgan Letters!"**: Bethenny Screams "You're a Sicko for Cabaret"; Dorinda Shops for Cheese; Luann Admires Her Own Poster; Ramona Ditches Dorinda at a Charity Event; Ramona Steals Lobsters; Sonja Falls on Her Face at the Dinner Table	
**Non Tele-Cast Awards**: 1. Best Power Move - **Mama Dee Tanks Her Company, Then Hands it Off to Deandra (RHOD)**; 2. Worst Three's Company Wig - **Stephanie (RHOD)**; 3. Worst Trip of the Year - **The Real Housewives of Beverly Hills**; 4. Most Awkward Charity Speech - **Ramona, Sonja & Dorinda Fighting at a Sexual Abuse Awareness Charity (RHONY)**; 5. Most Refusal to Stay Off TV - **Jill Zarin**; 6. Best Meltdown - **Vicki at the Reunion (RHOC)**; 7. Best Place Ruined by Bravo - **Miraval Resort & Spa**; 8. Saddest Workout Scene - **Kyle Speeding Around Her Backyard (RHOBH)**; 9. Drunkest Wedding in History - **MJ & Tommy (Shahs of Sunset)**; 10. Messiest Wedding - **Reagan & Reese (Southern Charm: New Orleans)**; 11. Best Song of the Year - **"Yeah, Yeah, GO GO GO, Yeah, Yeah, Yeah, No No" by Trixie Monocle**; 12. Worst Song of the Year -**Thailand Song**(**RHOD)**; 13. Best Public Binge Moment - **Deandra Eats 50 Donuts at Her 50th Birthday** **(RHOD)**; 14. Least Apologies Ever Given at a Reunion - **Nene Leakes (RHOA)**; 15. Most Missed Sound - **"Carl, Carl, Carl" (Summer House)**; 16. Worst Nickname- **"Carlitaaa" Texicanas**; 17. Least Scary Almost Murder - **Candiace with a Butter Knife (RHOP)**; 18. Best Decorations - **Sonja's Taped Up Towel Curtains (RHONY)**; 19. Most in Need of a Towel - **Anyone Who Talks to Frank Catania (RHONJ)**; 20. Best Gail Simmons Moment - **Every Second that Gail Ate (Top Chef)**; 21. Greatest Architectural Achievement - **Luann's Roundhouse (RHONY)**; 22. Worst Architectural Achievement - **Toya's Closet** **(Married to Medicine)**; 23. Outstanding Love of the Pocket, the Stitching, the Fabric, and the Zipper - **Nina Garcia (Project Runway)**; 24. Best International Cuisine - **Taco Salad**; 25. Best Words Spoken on a Yacht - **"June June Hannah" (Below Deck Med)**; 26. Sexiest Vamp of the Year - **Bill Aydin (RHONJ)**; 27. Best Off-Screen Villain - **Shelley (Southern Charm)**; 28. Best Taunt - **"Dog with a Bone" Dolores Catania(RHONJ)**; 29. Worst Use of Technology - **Kyle Richards Postmates a Rolex to Dinner** **(RHOBH)**; 30. Best Forgotten Item of the Year - **Bethenny's Truffle Fries (RHONY)**

2019 Golden Crappies
2019
**Best Bravo Show** **Real Housewives of New York**: Below Deck; Below Deck Mediterranean; Real Housewives of Dallas; Southern Charm; Vanderpump Rules		**Bravo Star of the Year** **Catherine Dennis (Southern Charm)**: Captain Lee (Below Deck); Classic Marge (RHONJ); Kate Chastain (Below Deck); Countess Luann (RHONY); Kelly Dodd (RHOC); LeeAnne Locken (RHOD); Padma Lakshmi (Top Chef); Porsha Williams (RHOA)	**Best Non-Regular Cast Member** **Patricia Altschul** (Southern Charm): Collie's Mom (Below Deck); Linda in Vicki's Office (RHOC); Marlo Hampton (RHOA); Dee Simmons (RHOD); Vida (Shahs of Sunset); Master Pearson (Below Deck)
**Most Perfectly Bravo Moment** **Craig Maims His Hand Trying it Stab His Wall with a Butter Knife (Summer House)**: Bruce Calls Bucatini His Spirit Pasta (Top Chef); Dorit & Teddi Get Into a Feud Over Wine Glasses (RHOBH); Kameron Thinks that She's Accused of Bashing an Adopted Baby (RHOD); Karen Huger Holds a Press Conference (RHOP); Kristen Throws Water at James but Splashes Lala Instead (Vanderpump Rules); Ramona Poisons Bethenny with Fish (RHONY); Tinsley Cries Over her Eggs (RHONY); Toya Sees a Crab and Instinctively Punches Tessa in the Boob (Married to Medicine)		**Most Deeply Satisfying Moment** **Chandler Gets Fired** (Below Deck): Anytime Naomi is Mad at Someone (Southern Charm); Kristen Doute Hobbling Off on Crutches (Vanderpump Rules); Kyle Richards Gets Sick From a Horse (RHOBH); Vicki Nearly Loses a Finger on the Ropes Course(RHOC); Ramona Gets Stuck in an Elevator (RHONY); Scheana is Forced to Eat a Chicken Sandwich (Vanderpump Rules); Stassi Has a Birthday Meltdown While Dressed Like a Zombie, Leaving Kristen & Katie with the Tab (Vanderpump Rules)	**Most Shocking Moment** **Ashley Tells Katherine She's Not a Good Mother** (Southern Charm): Ashton Goes Overboard (Below Deck); Jax Almost Drowns (Vanderpump Rules); Jeff & Jenny Break Up (Flipping Out); Steven Outs Karl (Summer House); Monique Samuels Crashes into a Small Tree & The Almost a Larger Tree (RHOP); Ramona Take a Shit on the Floor in Colombia (RHONY); A Police Officer Threw a Baloney Sandwich at Ramona's Face (RHONY); Dorinda Mocks Luann for Her Mug Shot (RHONY)
**Best Non-Housewives Show** **Southern Charm**: Below Deck; Below Deck Mediterranean; Get a Room With Carson & Thom; Married to Medicine; Vanderpump Rules	**Best Housewives Show of the Year** **Real Housewives of New York**: Real Housewives of Atlanta; Real Housewives of Dallas; Real Housewives of Potomac	**Best Dumb Fight** **Conrad Asks Hannah to Pay for Her Cigarettes (Below Deck Mediterranean)**: Brandy Accuses LeeAnne of Cloning Her Phone (RHOD); Dorit & Kyle Battle to be LVP's Best Friend (RHOBH); Erika Gets Her Period (RHOBH); Marlo Mocks Porsha's Tiny Doormate (RHOA); The Nutcracker (RHONY); Roaches in Nene's House (RHOA); The Case of the Curiously Arranged Pillows (Vanderpump Rules)	**The Worst** **Ashley Jacobs** (Southern Charm): Candiace Dillard (RHOP); Chandler Brooks (Below Deck); Jennifer Aydin (RHONJ); Kim Zolciak (RHOA); Crazy Ladies on Season Premiere of Below Deck Mediterranean; Vicki Gunvalson (RHOC)
**Best Bad Style** **Gina's Bleach Blonde Hair (RHOC)**: Dr. Simone (Married to Medicine); Carrie (RHOD); Carl Radke (Summer House); Barbara's Wrap Dress (RHONY); Kyle's Red Fedora (RHOBH); Raquel's Swiffer Dress at the Reunion (Vanderpump Rules)		**Best Screaming Match** **Catherine vs. Ashley at the Finale Party** (Southern Charm): Carole vs. Bethenny at the Reunion (RHONY); Dorinda vs. Sonja (RHONY); James vs. Lala re: pasta (Vanderpump Rules); Mariah threatens to Shank a b*tch (Married to Medicine); Shannon Loses Her Mind in Jamaica (RHOC)	**Biggest Douchebag** **Thomas Ravenal** (Southern Charm): Karl (Summer House); Dr. Gregory (Married to Medicine); Jax Taylor (Vanderpump Rules); Joao Franco (Below Deck); Patrick (Vanderpump Rules); Shane Simpson (RHOC)
**Biggest Douchebag** **Thomas Ravenal** (Southern Charm): Karl (Summer House); Dr. Gregory (Married to Medicine); Jax Taylor (Vanderpump Rules); Joao Franco (Below Deck); Patrick (Vanderpump Rules); Shane Simpson (RHOC)	**Most instantly Iconic Line** **"It's Not About the Pasta!" - James Kennedy (Vanderpump Rules)**: "Hola Chiquitos" - Luann de Lesseps (RHONY); "I'm Exhausted, My Weave is Exhausted, My Panty Liner is Exhausted!" - LeeAnne Locken (RHOD); "Jovani" - Dorinda Medley (RHONY); "What's Wrong With My Sewing?" - Craig Conover (Southern Charm); "Wow, Woah" - Ramona Singer (RHONY); "You're a Dork!" - Kelly Dodd(RHOC); "Security!" - Karen Huger (RHOP); "You Don't Support Other Women!" - Ramona Singer (RHONY)		**Outstanding Achievement in Business & Self Promotion** **Countess & Friends**: Beverly Beach (RHOBH); Craig's Pillows (Southern Charm); La Dame Fragrance by Karen Huger (RHOP); Linfinity Dress (RHOD); Not For Lazy Moms by Monique Samuels (RHOP); Real for Real Cuisine by Shannon Beador (RHOC); She by Sheree (RHOA); Reza Be Obsessed (Shahs of Sunset); The Agency (RHOBH)
**Lifetime Achievement Award for Shade & Disdain** **Kate Chastain** (Below Deck)	**Non Tele-cast Awards**: 1. Hottest Bravolebrity - **Craig Conover (Summer House)**; 2. Craziest Crazy Face - **Ashley (Southern Charm)**; 3. Excellence in Bone Carrying & Shit-Stirring - **Kristen Doute**; 4. Best Vacation - **Cartagena, RHONY**; 5. Most Sorry - **Ramona Singer & Laura (Below Deck)**; 6. Most Impactful - **Amit (Summer House)**; 7. Most Doomed Relationship - **Scheana & Rob (Vanderpump Rules)**; 8. Most Potential - **Tinsley's Eggs (RHONY)**; 9. Most Pudding-Like - **P.K. (RHOBH)**; 10. Best Musical Instrument of 2018 - **Tom Sandoval's Trumpet (Vanderpump Rules)**; 11. Best Pet Expo - **Global Pet Expo for Distributors**; 12. Best Feud -**Catherine vs. Ashley (Southern Charm)**		

2018 Golden Crappies
2018
**Best Bravo Show** **Real Housewives of Dallas**: Below Deck Mediterranean; Real Housewives of New Jersey; Real Housewives of Atlanta; Summer House; Vanderpump Rules; Real Housewives of New York	**Best Bravolebrity** **LeeAnne Locken** (RHOD): Captain Sandy (Below Deck Mediterranean); Dr. Heavenly (Married to Medicine); Kate Chastain (Below Deck); Kandi Burruss (RHOA); Kelly Dodd (RHOC); Margaret Josephs (RHONJ); Lisa Rinna (RHOBH); Countess Luann (RHONY); Ray (RHONY)	**Biggest Twist of 2017** **Lisa Rinna Sheds a Single Tear When Kim Returns Her Bunny** (RHOBH): LeeAnne Locken Says Mark gets His Dick Sucked at the Round Up (RHOD); Porsha Accuses Kandi of Having a Sex Dungeon & Raping People (RHOA); Ashley is Secretly a Baggage Handler for Delta (Southern Charm: Savannah); Sonja's Fridge Makes Brown Ice (RHONY); Lisa Rinna Asks Dorit if People Were Doing Coke in Her Bathroom (RHOBH); Everything on Vanderpump Rules	
**Worst Bravo Show** **RelationShep**: Jax & Brittany Take Kentucky; Real Housewives of Orange County; The First Family of Hip Hop; A Night With My Ex; Stripped	**Best Bravolebrity** **LeeAnne Locken** (RHOD): Captain Sandy (Below Deck Mediterranean); Dr. Heavenly (Married to Medicine); Kate Chastain (Below Deck); Kandi Burruss (RHOA); Kelly Dodd (RHOC); Margaret Josephs (RHONJ); Lisa Rinna (RHOBH); Countess Luann (RHONY); Ray (RHONY)	**Best Storyline** **It's About Tom** (RHONY): Vicki Gunvalson Causes Shannon Beador to Gain 60 Pounds (RHOC); Phaedra Starts Lesbian Rumors About Kandi(RHOA); LeeAnne Locken Goes Nuts at the Dr.'s Office (RHOD); Onion Gate Below Deck Mediterranean	**Worst Storyline** **Tamra & Vicki's Feud** (RHOC): Lydia's Balls Voyage Party (RHOC); Karen & Cha Cha's Feud Over Hosting Bermuda Trip (RHOP); Panty Gate (RHOBH); Any Sex Tips to Straight Women From a Gay Man; Asa's Pregnancy (Shahs of Sunset)
**Outstanding Achievement in the Towel Arts** **Ramona Wearing a Towel on Her Face in Mexico** (RHONY): Vicki Gunvalson in Iceland (RHOC)	**Hottest Bar of 2017** **The Regency**: The Quiet Woman; The Round Up; Beautique; The Back Alley of SUR	**Best Fight** **Shannon Beador vs. Kelly Dodd at The Quiet Woman (RHOC)**: Danielle Staub vs. Siggy Flicker (RHONJ); Kristen vs. Tom Sandoval Dressed as Sia (Vanderpump Rules); Kandi vs. Phaedra at the Reunion (RHOA); Ramona vs. Bethenny in the Berkshires (RHONY); LeeAnne Locken vs. Cary Deuber (RHOD)	**The Worst** **Meghan King Edmonds** (RHOC): Thomas Ravenel (Southern Charm); Chef Adam (Below Deck Med); Charise Jackson-Jordan (RHOP); Landon Clemens (Southern Charm); Siggy Flicker (RHONJ)
**Best Old Lady** **Dee Simmons (RHOD)**: Patricia Altschul (Southern Charm); Vida (Shahs of Sunset); Marge Sr. (RHONJ); Tinsley's Mom (RHONY)	**Bethenny Frankel Entrepreneurial Award Honoring New & Exciting Businesses** **"Sparkle Dog" Pink Dog Food** (RHOD): Gorga's Pizzeria (RHONJ); The Countess Bedding Collection(RHONY); Pump Sessions Vol. 1 by DJ James Kennedy (Vanderpump Rules); True Gold Baby Shoes (Shahs of Sunset); Noblemen Magazine (RHOC); Envy Boutique (RHONJ); Roam.com (Southern Charm)		
**Most Vexxing Question** **"Are You Kidding Me?" - Ramona Singer** (RHONY): "Where's Karl?" (Summer House)		**Legacy Award for Being One of the Founding Members of Watch What Crappens** **Matt Whitfield**	**Best Crappens Listener** **Meana Coochy**
**Non Tele-Cast Awards**: 1. Most Memorable Memory Loss - **Lisa Rinna(RHOBH)**; 2. Worst Idea - **Katie & Tom Have a Wednesday Wedding**; 3. Worst Concept - **Nene's Girls & Gays White Party Seafood Soiree**; 4. Worst Comeback - **Lydia McLoughlin**; 5. Worst Mr. Darcy Comparison - **Thomas Ravenel (Southern Charm)**; 6. Most Surprising Voice of Reason - **Carny Wilson**; 7. Outstanding Athletic Achievement - **Luann de Lesseps for Falling in a Rose Bush & Then Off of a Ledge(RHONY)**; 8. Most Badass - **Dorinda Medley for Getting so Drunk She Stabbed Herself with a Knife & Didn't Even Realize (RHONY)**; 9. Outstanding Achievements in Journalism - **WWHL One-On-One with the Countess in Sag Harbor**; 10. Most international in General - **Dorit Kemsley** **(RHOBH)**; 11. Best Overreaction - **Siggy Flicker for Soggy-Gate, Cake-Gate, and Hitler-Gate (RHONJ)**; 12. Best Fashion Statement - **Stassi's Steve Jobs Swimsuit (Summer House)**; 13. Best New Fit - **It**; 14. Best Show You Probably Didn't Watch but Should Have - **Invite Only Cabo**; 15. Best New Show of 2017 - **Summer House**; 16. Best Gay - **Steven (Summer House)**; 17. Most Patient Boyfriend - **Tommy (Shahs of Sunset)**; 18. Best Seamstress - **Craig (Southern Charm)**; 19. Outstanding Achievement in Evil Glares - **David Beador (RHOC)**; 20. Biggest Rose - **Tom D'Agostino (RHONY)**; 21. Biggest Thorn - **Tom D'Agostino (RHONY)**; 22. Best Housewives Tagline - **"Dumb Blondes Get Noticed, Smart Blondes Get Everything"** - Kameron Westcott (RHOD); 23. Best Quote By a Drunk - **"Clip! Clip!"** by Dorinda Medley (RHONY); 24. Best Quote by a Duo or a Group - **"Who Said That? Who Said That? Who Said That?"** (RHOA); 25. Best Quote of the Year - **"They're Just Hands, But They Work Quite Well"** by LeeAnne Locken (RHOD); 26. Best Quote of the Year (For Real) - **"This Isn't My Plate You Fucking Bitch!"** by Shannon Beador (RHOC); 27. Best New Drunk - **Emily Moses** (Invite Only Cabo); 28. Best New Reporter -**Reporter Christina Gibson**; 29. Best New Housewife with Debilitating Mommy Issues - **Deandra Simmons** (RHOD); 30. Most Special Place in our Hearts - **Eden Sasoon** (RHOBH); 31. Best New Housewife Overall - **Margaret Josephs** (RHONJ)

2017 Golden Crappies
2017
**Best Bravo Show** **Real Housewives of Orange County**: Real Housewives of New York; Ladies of London; Below Deck; Vanderpump Rules; Southern Charm; Real Housewives of Beverly Hills	**Best Bravo Star** **Luann de Lesseps (RHONY)**: Siggy Flicker (RHONJ); Lala Kent (Vanderpump Rules); Catherine Dennis (Southern Charm); Ramona Singer (RHONY); Dorinda Medley (RHONY); Caroline Fleming (Ladies of London); Captain Lee (Below Deck); LeeAnne Locken (RHOD); Kandi Burruss (RHOA); Kelly Dodd (RHOC)	**Best Supporting Bravo Star** **Ray** (RHONY): Cindy Rose (Married to Medicine: Houston); Patricia Altschul (Southern Charm); Vida (Shahs of Sunset); Gail Simmons (Top Chef); Marie (RHOD); JD (Southern Charm)
**Worst Show** **Recipe for Deception**: There Goes the Motherhood; Tour Group; Real Housewives of New Jersey; Million Dollar Listing (all); Manzo'd With Children	**Best Bravo Star** **Luann de Lesseps (RHONY)**: Siggy Flicker (RHONJ); Lala Kent (Vanderpump Rules); Catherine Dennis (Southern Charm); Ramona Singer (RHONY); Dorinda Medley (RHONY); Caroline Fleming (Ladies of London); Captain Lee (Below Deck); LeeAnne Locken (RHOD); Kandi Burruss (RHOA); Kelly Dodd (RHOC)	**The Manipulation Award** **Tamra Judge** (RHOC): Bethenny Frankel - Allegedly Worked w Production to Show Tom Cheating on Luann (RHONY); Lisa Vanderpump (RHOBH); Reza - For Turning the Group on Each Other (Shahs of Sunset); Jacqueline Laurita (RHONJ); Yolanda Hadid - For Getting the Group to Finally Turn on LVP (RHOBH)
**The Worst** **Charise** (RHOP): Meghan King Edmonds (RHOC); Jacqueline Laurita(RHONJ); Katie Maloney (Vanderpump Rules); Ryan (Below Deck Med); Apollo (Newlyweds: The First Year); Pettifleur (RHOMelbourne)	**Best Comeback from a Reputation Disaster** **Sonja Morgan Not Drinking for a Few Weeks** (RHONY): Ramona Singer (RHONY); Tamra & Jesus (RHOC); Vicki Gunvalson (RHOC); Porsha Williams (RHOA); Lisa Rinna (RHOBH); Teresa Giudice (RHONJ)	**Best Fight** **The Nose Flick Heard Round the World (RHOC)**: 70's Party (RHOC); Sushi Dinner (RHOC); Ireland Bus Ride (RHOC); Fight in Dorinda's Kitchen (RHONY); Bethenny vs. John (RHONY); Ray & Dorinda vs. Dorinda & John (RHONY); Catherine vs. Landon (Southern Charm); Tour Bus C Word Fight (Tour Group); Karen Huger vs. Giselle Bryant (RHOP); LeeAnne Locken vs. Trolley (RHOD); Everyone vs. PettifleurRHOMelbourn
**Most Deserving of a Spin-Off** **Ramona & Any Random Guy in a Bar** (RHONY): Juliette & Caroline Stanbury (Ladies of London); Emily & Ben? (Below Deck); Luann & Bag Boy Tom (RHONY); Erika & Yolanda (RHOBH)	**Biggest Disaster** **Catherine Dennis** (Southern Charm): Trevor (Below Deck); Kelly Dodd (RHOC); Gigi (Shahs of Sunset); LeeAnne Locken (RHOD); Danny (Below Deck Med)	**Best Fight** **The Nose Flick Heard Round the World (RHOC)**: 70's Party (RHOC); Sushi Dinner (RHOC); Ireland Bus Ride (RHOC); Fight in Dorinda's Kitchen (RHONY); Bethenny vs. John (RHONY); Ray & Dorinda vs. Dorinda & John (RHONY); Catherine vs. Landon (Southern Charm); Tour Bus C Word Fight (Tour Group); Karen Huger vs. Giselle Bryant (RHOP); LeeAnne Locken vs. Trolley (RHOD); Everyone vs. PettifleurRHOMelbourn
**Biggest Sleaze** **Ryan** (Below Deck Med): John the Dry Cleaner (RHONY); Michael Wainstein (RHONY); Tom D'Augostino (RHONY); DJ James Kennedy (Vanderpump Rules); Apollo (Newlyweds: The First Year); Michael Darby (RHOP)	**Best Newbie** **LeeAnne Locken (RHOD)**: Karen Huger (RHOP); Kelly Dodd (RHOBH); Erika Jayne (RHOBH); Sophie Stanbury (Ladies of London)	**Storyline That Most Deserves to Die** **Geriatric Pregnancies**: Vagina Waxings; Trendy Exercise Classes; Crab Boils; Hat Parties
**Best Entrepreneurial Endeavor** **Kill All Cancer by Vicki Gunvalson** (RHOC): Tipsy Girl Prosecco by Sonja Morgan (RHONY); Cynthia Bailey Handbags (RHOA); Gigi Hadid by Yolanda (RHOBH)	**Best Interview Outfit** **Karen Huger's Muppet Dress** (RHOP): Phaedra's White Cottonelle Number (RHOA); Phaedra's Bordello Madame Ice Skating Dress (RHOA)	**Best Friend-ployee****Christian Coach Mia** (RHOC): Erika Jayne's Mikey (RHOBH); Paulene & Reno (Ladies of London); Old Lady Gang (RHOA); Sonja's Interns (RHONY); Jesus (RHOC)

2016 Golden Crappies
2016
**Best Bravo Show** **Real Housewives of New York**: Ladies of London; Real Housewives of Orange County; Southern Charm; Below Deck; Vanderpump Rules; Real Housewives of Beverly Hills; Secrets and Wives (x2); Real Housewives of Melbourne	**Best Bravo Star** **Caroline Stanbury**: Caroline Fleming; Liza; Luann "Don't be all uncool" De Lesseps; Lisa Rinna (RHOBH); Shannon Beador (RHOC); Micah (Blood, Sweat & Heels); Lauren (RHOChesire); Megali (RHOChesire); Kate Chastain (Below Deck); Cameron (Southern Charm); Shep (Southern Charm); Claudia Jordan (RHOA); Daisy (Blood, Sweat & Heels); MJ (Shahs of Sunset); Lisa Vanderpump (RHOBH); Kandi Burruss (RHOA)	**Best Supporting Character** **Wedding Planner from** My Fab 40th: Hanky the Swan (Vanderpump Rules); Cooper (Southern Charm); Valentina (Ladies of London); Patricia Altschul (Southern Charm); Chef Penny (VPR); Arthur the Evil Dentist; Tammy (RHOA); Lizar's Mom (Secrets and Wives); "Floofy?" (RHOMelbourne); #Justice Headband; Lydia's Child/ Housekeeper; MJ's Mom (Shahs of Sunset); Sophie Stanbury (RHOMelbourne; Yolanda's Health Advocate (RHOBH); Gigi & Bella Hadid (RHOBH)
**Best Caroline Fleming-ism** **"How Lucky Are You?"**: Pink Himalayan Sea Salt; Offering Juliette Fritos; Offering Juliette Almond Butter; Complimentary Pesto Tutorial; Laughing About How Her Great Grandfather Murdered Julie's Great Grandfather-in-law; Forcing a Chef to Carry Comte Around a City For Her	**Best Feud** **Kim Richards vs. Kyle Richards** (RHOBH): Gamble vs. Janet RHOMelbourne; Luann vs. Carole (RHONY; Everyone vs. Vicki('s Fake Cancer) (RHOC); Meghan King Edmonds vs. Shannon Beador (RHOC); Thomas Ravanel vs. Catherine (Southern Charm); Lisa Rinna vs. Kim Richards (RHOBH); Bethenny vs. Heather (RHONY); Shep vs. Craig (Southern Charm?); Bethenny vs. Kristen (RHONY); Kate vs. Chef Leon (Below Deck); Gigi vs. Mike; Hanky vs. The Other Swans (RHOBH)	**The Worst** **Trainers on** Work Out New York: Stassi Schroder (Vanderpump Rules); Chef Leon (Below Deck); Eddy (Below Deck); Nene Leakes (RHOA); Quad (Married to Medicine); Mariah (Married to Medicine); Brandi Glanville; Brooks (RHOC); Teresa's Lawyer (RHONJ); Asifa & Bobby (Shahs of Sunset); Demetria (Blood, Sweat & Heels); Jessica & Mike (Shahs of Sunset); Richard Blaze (Top Chef); Lauren Manzo (RHONJ)
**Outstanding Achievement in Being a Husband or Boyfriend** **David Beador** (RHOC): Dorinda's John (RHONY); Yestirday (Blood, Sweat & Heels); Eugene (Married to Medicine); Arthur (Secrets and Wives)	**Simon Van Kempen "Best Husband Who Wants to be a Housewife" Award** **Johnathan (Secrets & Wives)**: Adyn (Married to Medicine); Peter Bailey (RHOA); Don Juan (RHOA); Brooks (RHOC); Greg (Blood, Sweat & Heels)	**Kim Zolciak Most Convincing But Possibly Not Real Disease Award** **Brooks' Cancer** (RHOC): Yolanda's Chronic Lyme Disease (RHOBH); Kim Richards' Hernia/Ulcer/Meth Habit/House stolen-itis (RHOBH); Kyle's Kids Fear of Piercings (RHOBH); Erika Jayne's fear of Piercings (RHOBH)
**Worst Show of the Year** **RHONJ: Teresa Checks In**: Manzo'd With Children; Apres Ski; Work Out New York; Untying the Knot; Don't Be Tardy; Mother Funders; My Fab 40	**Worst Wedding Drama** **Scheana & Shay** (Vanderpump Rules): Reza & Tame Gay(Shahs of Sunset); Lauren Manzo (RHONJ); Tamra & Jesus (RHOC); Demetria & Greg (Blood, Sweat & Heels)	**Martin Lawrence Billard Award for Outstanding Achievement in Table Drama** **Vicki Telling the Sushi Table Lady to Get a Real Job** (RHOC): Amy's Broken Table (Secrets & Wives); Caroline Fleming's Bookcase Table (Ladies of London); Don's Creme de la Creme Table DramaRHOCheshire; Table Dancer Drama (Married to Medicine)
**Best Newcomer** **Meghan King Edmonds** (RHOC): Dorinda Medley (RHONY); Lala Kent (Vanderpump Rules); Jill the Daffodil (Married to Medicine); Gamble Breaux (RHOMelbourne); Caroline Fleming (Ladies of London); Pettifleur Berenger(RHOMelbourne); Chantal (Blood, Sweat & Heels); Arzo (Blood, Sweat & Heels)	**Best Voice** **Dorinda Medley** (RHONY): Liza (Secrets & Wives); Madalay (RHOChesire); Gamble (RHOMelbourne); Ampika (RHOChesire); Lauren (RHOChesire); Gina Liano (RHOMelbourne); Caroline Fleming (Ladies of London); Sheree Whitfield (RHOA); Toya (Married to Medicine); Debbie (RHOChesire)	**Meghan King Edmonds Award for Outstanding Achievement in #Justice, #Truth & #Knowledge (RHOC)** **Sussing Out Shannon's Judgey Eyes**: Doing Hailey's Homework; Figuring Out Minute Rice; Emailing with Brooks' Ex; Pretending to be a Cancer Patient at Newport Imaging; Realizing It's Better to be Friends with Your Stepdaughter Than a Parent
**Biggest Disaster** **Rocky (Below Deck)**: Jax Taylor (VPR); James Kennedy (VPR); Vicki Gunvalson (RHOC); Shannon Beador (RHOC); Julie (Ladies of London); Thomas Ravanel (Southern Charm); Katheryn Ravanel (Southern Charm); Craig Conover (Southern Charm); MJ (Shahs of Sunset); Yolanda's Medicine Cabinet (RHOBH)	**"Scary Island" Best Vacation Award** **Atlantic City** (RHONY): The Fancy Island (Southern Charm); Turks & Caicos (RHONY); Denmark (Ladies of London); Amsterdam (RHOBH)	**Outstanding Achievement in Entrepreneurialism** **Peter's Brew** (RHOA): Annabelle Nielson's Book; Jub Balls (Ladies of London); Thomas Ravanel's Campaign Ad; Asa's Veil in Front of Vegas Buffet in Hollywood (Shahs of Sunset); Porsha Williams' Businesses (RHOA); Sonja's Lifestyle Brand (RHONY); Truth + Beauty; Kristen Taekman's Pop of Color Nail Polish; Cynthia Bailey's Shades (RHOA); Geneva's Pop Daily (Blood, Sweat & Heels); Fit is the New Hit (Married to Medicine); Kenya Moore Hair Care; Dr. Eugene, Nomad MD (Married to Medicine); Tom & Tom's Liquor Consulting; Kenya Moore's Pilot "Life Twirls On"
**Best Fight** **Lisa Rinna vs. Kim Richards Amsterdam (RHOBH)**: Claudia vs. Nene (RHOA); Cynthia vs. Porsha (RHOA); Lisa Nicole vs. Quad (Married to Medicine); Shannon vs. Vicki on the Season Finale (RHOC); Geneva vs. The Taxi Driver (Blood, Sweat & Heels); Geneva vs. Melissa Ford at the Season Finale (Blood, Sweat & Heels); Kenya vs. Tammy's Crazy Nephew (RHOA; Kristen vs. James (Vanderpump Rules); Heavenly Calling Jill Stupid (Married to Medicine); Kandi's Aunts vs. The Ice on the Ski Cabin Steps (RHOA); Jessica vs. MJ/Everybody (Shahs of Sunset)

2015 Golden Crappies
2015
**Best Bravo Show** **Real Housewives of Melbourne** & **Vanderpump Rules**: Real Housewives of Orange County; Game of Crowns; Top Chef: New Orleans; Below Deck	**Bravolebrity of the Year** **Shannon Beador (RHOC)**: Josh Flagg (Million Dollar Listing: LA); Gail Simmons (Top Chef); Kandi Burruss (RHOA); Fawni (Euros of Hollywood); Gina (Real Housewives of Melbourne); Thomas Ravenel (Southern Charm); Micah (Blood, Sweat & Heels); Caroline Stanbury (Ladies of London); Eileen Davidson (RHOBH)	**Most Shocking Moment** **Aviva Throwing Her Prosthetic Leg on the Table** (RHONY): Shahs of Sunset Being Actually Moving When They Visited Iran; Caroline Manzo on a Trapeze (RHONJ); Nina Losing Top Chef New Orleans
**Most Overdone Plot Lines on Bravo** **Weddings,Vow Renewals, Etc.**: Vagina Waxing; Twitter Fights "I Only Retweeted"; Spray Tanning; Old Ladies Who Think We're Going to Believe They're Capable & Willing to Have a Baby & Ordering a Fake One to Practice With; Kids Going Off to College	**Bravolebrity of the Year** **Shannon Beador (RHOC)**: Josh Flagg (Million Dollar Listing: LA); Gail Simmons (Top Chef); Kandi Burruss (RHOA); Fawni (Euros of Hollywood); Gina (Real Housewives of Melbourne); Thomas Ravenel (Southern Charm); Micah (Blood, Sweat & Heels); Caroline Stanbury (Ladies of London); Eileen Davidson (RHOBH)	**Best Friend-Of** **Rosie** (RHONJ): Luann (RHONY); Danielle's Gay Husband (RHOC); Pickles (RHONY); Jacquelyn & Kathy (RHONJ); Rosie (RHONJ); Victoria Gotti (RHONJ)
**Biggest Cut Fitness** **Andy Cohen**: Reza (Shahs of Sunset); Aviva Drescher(RHONY); Ramona Singer (RHONY); Josh Taekman (RHONY); Jim Marchese (RHONJ); Aaron (Top Chef Boston); Lynne Diamante(Game of Crowns); Kristen Doute (Vanderpump Rules); Katie Maloney (Vanderpump Rules); Stassi Schroder (Vanderpump Rules); Mama Joyce (RHOA)	**Best Vacation** **Puerto Rico for Making LVP Cry** (RHOBH): Hamptons Trip (Blood, Sweat & Heels); Montana & Berkshires from RHONY; Iran for Asa Learning She Doesn't Have Equal Rights in Her Home Country (Shahs of Sunset); Bali Trip (RHOC); Mexico Trip for Stassi's Birthday (Vanderpump Rules)	**Best Fight** **Mama Joyce vs Ms. Sharon (RHOA)** & **Stassi Punching Kristen in the Face (VPR)**: RHOA Pajama Party; Porsha vs. Kenya (RHOA); Shannon vs. Heather at the Dinner Party (RHOC); Heather vs. Shannon Over a Chair (RHOC); Mama Joyce Going After Carmen with a Shoe (RHOA); Mama Joyce vs Ms. Sharon (RHOA); Real Housewives of Melbourne vs. Gina
**Worst Plastic Surgery on Bravo** **Scheana Shay (VPR)**: Brandi Glanville (RHOBH); Tamra Barney (RHOC); Vicki Gunvalson (RHOC); Entire Cast of Game of Crowns	**Worst Bravolebrity That We Overlooked Earlier in the Show** **Heather Dubrow** (RHOC): Nene Leakes (RHOA); Andrea (Melbourne)	**Bravo Personality That Tries Too Hard** **Kristina Kelly** (Vanderpump Rules): Erin, friend of Aviva (RHONY); Brandi Glanville (RHOBH); Cynthia Bailey (RHOA); Joyce & Carlton (RHOBH); All of the Real Housewives of New Jersey
**Most Difficult to F*ck Husband** **David Foster** (RHOBH): Mohamed Hadid (RHOBH); Harry Dubin (RHONY); Optometrist Husband (Game of Crowns); Quad's Husband (Married to Medicine); Greg Leakes (RHOA)	**Bravo Celebs Who Should Be Fired** **Lizzie** (RHOC): Amber (RHONJ); Two Twins from RHONJ; Brandi Glanville (RHOBH); Jill Zarin (RHONY); Richard Blaze (Top Chef Boston)	**Worst Show** **Manzo'd With Children**: Married to Medicine; Real Housewives of New Jersey; Don't Be Tardy; Blood, Sweat & Heels; Toned Up
**Most Overlooked Show on Bravo** **Game of Crowns**: Euros of Hollywood; Real Housewives of Melbourne; RHONY; Southern Charm	**Best New Housewife** **Shannon Beador** (RHOC): Eileen Davidson (RHOBH); Lisa Rinna (RHOBH); Kristen Taekman (RHONY); Claudia Jordan (RHOA)	**Best Shitty Show** **Vanderpump Rules**: Game of Crowns; Below Deck; Southern Charm; Euros of Hollywood
**Lifetime Achievement in Asshole-ry** **Tamra Judge**	**Best Song**: The Sounds Kandi Makes When She Talks (RHOA); Andy Cohen	

2014 Golden Crappies
2014
**Best Bravo Show** **Vanderpump Rules**: Top Chef: New Orleans; Real Housewives of Orange County; Real Housewives of Atlanta; Princesses: Long Island; Shahs of Sunset; Married to Medicine	**Best Bravo Star** **Kim Richards (RHOBH)**: MJ (Shahs of Sunset); Leah Black (RHOM); Kandi Burruss (RHOA); Lisa Vanderpump (RHOBH & VPR); Padma Lakshmi (Top Chef); Quad (Married to Medicine); Old Crusty Captain (Below Deck); Babbs (Princesses: Long Island)	**Best Awful New Show** **Vanderpump Rules**: Princesses: Long Island; Below Deck; Fashion Queens; Eat, Drink, Love; Newlyweds: The First Year; Married to Medicine; The New Atlanta	**Worst Bravo Show** **Courtney Loves Dallas**: Top Chef (Seattle Finale); Vanderpump Rules; All the Wedding Spinoffs; Fashion Queens; LA Shrinks
**Best Crazy Bit*h** **Mama Joyce** (RHOA): Kat (Below Deck); Mariah (Married to Medicine); Vicki's Irag War Vet Son-In-Law (RHOC); Vicki Gunvalson (RHOC); Ashley (Princesses: Long Island); Gigi (Shahs of Sunset)	**Person Who Deserves to Go to Jail the Most** **Joe, all included (RHONJ)**: Teresa (RHONJ); Carole Radziwell (RHONY); Phaedra Parks (RHOA); Jax Taylor for spreading disease all over L.A. (VPR)		**Worst Bravo Star** **Ashley** (Princesses: Long Island): Stassi Schroder (VPR); Kristen Doute (VPR); Reza (Shahs of Sunset); Heather Dubrow (RHOC); Slade Smiley (RHOC); Von (The New Atlanta)
**Best Fight** **Reza vs. Sasha (Shahs of Sunset)**: Married to Medicine Pool Brawl; Mama Joyce vs. Kandi's Friend/ Assistant (RHOA); Vicki vs. Lauri in Canada (RHOC); Joe vs Joe in Upstate New York (RHONJ); Peter vs. a Cab (RHOM)	**Best Average Person Who Thinks They're Super Hot** **Kristen Doute** (Vanderpump Rules): Erica (Princesses: Long Island); Ashley (Princesses: Long Island); CJ (Below Deck); Von (RHOA); Reza (Shahs of Sunset)		**Best Cry** **Kandi Crying About Her Mom (RHOA)** & **Reza Therapy Crying (Shahs of Sunset)**: Brandi Crying About Chica (RHOBH); Ashley Calling Her Mom (Princesses: Long Island); Wedding Dress Breakdown - Chanel (Princesses: Long Island)
**Most Believable "Businesswoman"** **Lisa Vanderpump** (RHOBH): Kandi Burruss (RHOA); Vicki Gunvalson (RHOC); Reza (Shahs of Sunset)		**Best Display of Intelligence** **Porsha Thinking the Underground Railroad was an actual Train Track Beneath the Ground** (RHOA): Anyone on VPR Saying "seriously?"; Von (RHOA); Joey's "Funny Looking" Retort (Princesses: Long Island); Anytime Malibu Country is Referenced (RHOC); "Oh Well You Know Peter" (RHOM)	
**Hottest Husband/ Partner** **Reza's Boyfriend** (Shahs of Sunset): Mauricio (RHOBH); Juicy Joe (RHONJ); Jax Taylor (VPR); Any of Gigi's Gay Boyfriends (Shahs of Sunset)	**Best Bravo Show to Make People Hate Minoroties & or Women** **Shahs of Sunset** **(Persians, Gays, Women)**: Princesses: Long Island (Antisemitism); Married to Medicine (Perpetuating Black Women as "Uncivilized"); Fashion Queens (Gays); Eat, Drink, Love (Women Are Unprofessional Sluts); Newlyweds: The First Year (Making Married Couples of all Kinds Look Awful)		
**Most Likely to Return to the Pole/ Internet Porn** **Lisa Hochstein** (RHOM): Joyce (RHOBH); Alexis (RHOC); Gigi (Shahs of Sunset)	**Best Alcoholic** **Kim Richards** (RHOBH): Brandi Glanville (RHOBH); Mama Joyce (RHOA); Kat (Below Deck)	**Best Entrepreneurial Failure** **Diamond Water** (Shahs of Sunset): Bethenny Frankel's Talk Show; Drink Hanky (Princesses: Long Island); Wines by Wives (RHOC); Bloody Piggy Vodka by Vicki (RHOC); Alexis Bellino's Trampoline; Pandora's Media Empire - The Divine Addiction	

2013 Golden Crappies
2013
**Best Bravo Show** **Gallery Girls**: Real Housewives of Miami; Real Housewives of Orange County; Real Housewives of Beverly Hills; Top Chef Texas; Real Housewives of New York; Million Dollar Decorators	**Best Bravolebrity** **Kim Richards** **(RHOBH)**: Lisa Vanderpump (RHOBH); Leah Black (RHOM); Kathy Wakile (RHONJ); Carole Radziwell (RHONY); Liz (Gallery Girls); Katherine Ireland & Mary McDonald (Million Dollar Decorators); Gail Simmons (Top Chef); Jeff Lewis (Flipping Out); Kathy Griffin (The Kathy Show)	**Best Bravo Gay** **Rosie** (RHONJ): Reza (Shahs of Sunset); Lauren Foster (RHOM); Alex (Gallery Girls); Miss Lawrence (RHOA)	**Best Help** **Frida** (RHOM): Zoila (Flipping Out); Daisy (RHOM); Bernie(RHOBH); Kathaleen (Million Dollar Decorators); Slade Smiley, "Assistant to Gretchen" (RHOBH)
**Best Moment** **Sonja Morgan Freaking Out Over The Impending Death of Her Beloved Bichon Frise Millou, Who Craps the Bed** (RHONY): Cake-Gate Season Finale (RHOC); Bitter Girls Doesn't Win Top Chef: Texas; Alexis Bellino Becoming a News Caster (RHOC); Annual Posh Fashion Show (RHONJ); Gallery Girls' One Season; Countess Luann Has Sex with Johnny Depp on Vacation & Denies It(RHONY); Adriana Slaps Joanna Krupa in the Face (RHOM); Thomas Kramer Loses His Shit at Dinner(RHOM); Adrienne Mails a Hideous Flower Arrangement to LVP (RHOBH); Kim Zolciak Exits RHOA		**Best Entrepreneurial Endeavor** **Sonja's Toaster Oven** (RHONY): Lauren Manzo's Cafface (RHONJ); Sonja's Party Planning Business (RHONY); The Maloof Hoof (RHOBH); Kathy Wakile's Cannoli Kit (RHONJ); Teresa's Fabalini (RHONJ); G Shoes Extensions; Chateau Sheree (RHOA); Diamond Water (Shahs of Sunset)	**Worst Bravolebrity** **Andy Cohen**: Ramona Singer (RHONY); Aviva Drescher (RHONY); Caroline Manzo (RHONJ); Teresa Giudice (RHONJ); Nene Leakes (RHOA); Kim Zolciak (RHOA); Tamra Barney (RHOC); Bethenny Frankel (RHONY); Adrienne Maloof (RHOBH)
**Housewife We Miss Most** **Kelly Bensimon** (RHONY): She by Sheree Whitfield (RHOA); Jill Zarin (RHONY); Camille Grammar (RHOBH); Alexia (RHOM); Larsa Pippen (RHOM)	**Most Desperate Wannabe** **Slade Smiley** (RHOC): Dana Wilkey (RHOBH); Faye Resnick (RHOBH); Ronnie's Friend Sarah (RHOC); Brooks (RHOC); Dwight (RHOA)	**Worst Show** **Around the World in 80 Plates**: Miss Advised; LoL Work; Don't Be Tardy for the Wedding; It's a Brad, Brad World	**Go to Shut Up Mountain Award** **Jill Zarin** (RHONY): Anna (RHOM); Taylor Armstrong (RHOBH); Kyle Richards (RHOBH)
**Worst Real Housewives Child** **Lauren Manzo** (RHONJ): Melania Giudice (RHONJ); Ashley Laurita (RHONJ)	**Best Newbie** **Carole Radziwell** (RHONY): Porsha Williams (RHOA); Heather Thompson (RHONY); Yolanda (RHOBH); Heather Dubrow (RHOC)	**Best Old Person** **Mama Elsa** (RHOM): Karent's Mother (RHOM); Josh's Grandmother (Million Dollar Listing L.A.); Lenny's Mom (RHOM); Mama Joyce (RHOA)	**Worst Old Person** **Ramona Singer** (RHONY): Thomas Kramer (RHOM); MJ's Mom (Shahs of Sunset); Aviva's Father (RHONY); Vicki Gunvalson (RHOC)
**Worst Husband** **Joe Giudice** (RHONJ): Mario Singer (RHONY); Peter Thomas (RHOA); Paul Nasif (RHOBH); Jim Bellino (RHOC)	**Most Memorable Fashion Statement** **Teresa Giudice's Mad Max Dress** (RHONJ): Martyn Lawrence Bullard's Ascot; Kim Richards' Giant Bow (RHOBH); Amy (Gallery Girls); Brandi Glanville's Fur Dress (RHOBH)	**Best Dinner Party** **Lisa Hochstein (RHOM)**: Thomas Kramer (RHOM); Bunko Night (RHOC); Season Finale Dinner Party (RHOC); Vicki's Crawfish Boil (RHOC); RV Trip (RHONJ); Sonja Drunk on Vacation (RHONY)	**Best Fight** **Aviva Drescher vs. Sonja & Ramona in St. Barts** (RHONY): Vicki Gunvalson vs. Tamra Barney - RHOC Season Finale; Adriana Punching Joanna Krupa (RHOM); Gigi Removing Her Earrings to Attack Asa (Shahs of Sunset); Upper East Side vs. Brooklyn (Gallery Girls)

== Recapped Shows ==
The podcast frequently uses acronyms when titling recap episodes in order to distinguish between which shows are being recapped in a specific episode.

=== Acronyms/Abbreviations: ===
- Apres Ski
- Around the World in 80 Plates
- Below Deck
- Below Deck Down Under
- Below Deck Med - Below Deck Mediterranean
- Below Deck Sailing Yacht
- Blood, Sweat and Heels
- Chimp Crazy
- Courtney Loves Dallas
- Denise Richards & Her Wild Things
- Eat, Drink, Love
- Euros of Hollywood
- Family Karma
- Fashion Queens
- Flipping Out
- Game of Crowns
- Gallery Girls
- Gen NYC - Next Gen NYC
- HOTD - House of the Dragon
- House Hunters
- Kandi & The Gang
- Ladies of London
- L.A. Shrinks
- Love Island USA
- Manzo'd With Children
- Married to Medicine
- Million Dollar Decorators
- Million Dollar Listing Los Angeles
- Mother Funders
- My Fab 40th
- Newlyweds: The First Year
- Princesses: Long Island
- RGIP - Real Girlfriends in Paris
- RHOA - Real Housewives of Atlanta
- RHOBH - Real Housewives of Beverly Hills
- Real Housewives of Cheshire
- RHOD - Real Housewives of Dallas
- RHODub - Real Housewives of Dubai
- RHOM - Real Housewives of Miami
- Real Housewives of Melbourne
- RHONJ - Real Housewives of New Jersey
- RHONY - Real Housewives of New York
- RHOC - Real Housewives of Orange County
- RHOSLC - Real Housewives of Salt Lake City
- RHUGT - Real Housewives Ultimate Girls Trip
- Shahs of Sunset
- SLOMW - The Secret Lives of Mormon Wives
- Sold on SLC
- Southern Charm
- Southern Hospitality
- Summer House
- Summer House MV - Summer House: Martha's Vineyard
- Tiger King
- Toned Up
- Top Chef
- The New Atlanta
- The Traitors (U.S.)
- The Valley
- Untying the Knot
- VPR - Vanderpump Rules
- Vanderpump Villa
- The White Lotus
- Winter House
- Work Out New York

== Episodes ==
The style of episode may vary between a recap, Live Show, Crappy Hour event, Trailer Trash, Airport Snaps, and more. A recap episode is typically posted within one week of the air date, in time for them to record their recap for the next week's episode.

== Live Shows ==
Watch What Crappens has taken their podcast live on tour both nationally & globally, with their most recent being the "Mounting Hysteria Tour". Their 2022 Tour was titled "The Hunky Dory Tour".

Live Shows will occasionally feature guests, which in the past have included Dorinda Medley, Lukas Gulbranson, and Jackie Goldschneider.
