= HNT =

HNT may refer to:

- Health Net, an American health insurer
- Homeless Not Toothless, an American dental organization
- Hoover Nature Trail, in Iowa, United States
- Hosted NAT traversal
- Huntly railway station, in Scotland
- Huntsworth, a British public relations company
- Neurotrimin, a protein
- A component of FreedomFi, a cellular network
