= LA Shrinks =

- Dr. Venus Nicolino, Dr. Gregory Carson and Eris Huemer (from left)
- Genre: Reality
- Starring: Eris Huemer; Gregory Cason; Venus Nicolino
- Country of origin: United States
- Original language: English
- No. of seasons: 1
- No. of episodes: 8

Production
- Executive producers: Elise Duran; Kevin Dill; Mechelle Collins
- Running time: 42–43 minutes
- Production company: Intuitive Entertainment

Original release
- Network: Bravo
- Release: March 4 – April 22, 2013

LA Shrinks is an American reality television series on Bravo and premiered on March 4, 2013.

== Premise ==
LA Shrinks follows the daily professional and personal lives of three Los Angeles-based shrinks.

== Cast ==
=== Eris Huemer ===
Dr. Eris Huemer has degrees from Pacifica Graduate Institute and the online Ryokan College, and is licensed as a marriage and family therapist in California and works as a "life coach". She is married to Clayton Winans and has one boy, Phoenix Winans.

=== Venus Nicolino ===
Venus Nicolino has a Doctor of Philosophy in clinical psychology from the California School of Professional Psychology but is not licensed as a therapist or psychologist. She works as a "life consultant" and lives in Bel Air, Los Angeles with her husband Matthew Johnson, their two sons, ages 3 and 5, and her two nephews, ages 5 and 7.

=== Gregory Cason ===
Greg Cason has a Doctor of Philosophy in counseling psychology from the University of Houston. and is a licensed psychologist located in Beverly Hills who specializes in cognitive therapy with individuals and couples. Kevin Beer is his partner of 23 years and the couple is in the process of planning their wedding. They reside in West Hollywood.

== Episodes ==
No.	Title	Original release date	U.S. viewers (millions)
1	"Sexual Healing"	March 4, 2013	0.74
Nicolino has a new client who's having some trouble in the bedroom. Her husband is off on a business trip to Las Vegas so she's left alone to take care of her four young boys. Huemer assists a couple on their straining sex life then realizes it's occurring in her own relationship. Dr. Greg worries about how his homophobic father will react to Greg getting married.
2	"Fear and Loving in Los Angeles"	March 11, 2013	0.47
Dr. Greg and his dad have lunch to discuss Greg's upcoming wedding. Huemer struggles to get her stubborn client, Kimberly, to let go of some control issues. Nicolino gets pushed over the edge as she balances taking care of her four boys and getting work done. Note: This is the first episode to air at the series' new time slot of 9:00PM ET/PT.
3	"Carry the Weight"	March 18, 2013	0.65
Dr. Greg works with a client who despises overweight people. Later, Greg's sisters get angry when he reveals that their abusive father may attend his wedding. Huemer suffers an emotional breakdown while in sex therapy with her husband. While at work, her client Kimberly has problems in the past which is affecting her current marriage. Nicolino assists twin brothers Georgie and Michael explore their kinky sides despite the two having different sexual orientations. Note: This is the first episode to air in the series' new time slot of 10 p.m.
4	"The Naked Truth"	March 25, 2013	0.76
Nicolino contemplates having her breast implants removed. Later, she takes her homophobic client Jacob and his twin brother on an adventure to a gay nightclub. Huemer goes to a plastic surgeon to find out whether she will be able to breastfeed if she gets plastic surgery. In the office, Huemer is surprised when her client Kimberly walks out on their session.
5	"Under My Skin"	April 1, 2013	0.80
Huemer figures out what happened to cause Kimerly's breakdown and later meets her newest client, a Playboy bunny who keeps finding the wrong men. Nicolino thinks her breast implants carry a stereotype she no longer wants to be associated with. Greg and his client, Chris, go to a therapy session at a "fat camp". Dr. Greg and his father attend their own therapy session.
6	"Family Affairs"	April 8, 2013	0.72
Dr. Greg and his father decide to see a therapist together after Greg has an emotional break-down while talking with his father. Huemer former Playboy bunny client comes to their session wearing ridiculous pajamas. Later, Huemer tells her husband to go visit a fertility doctor with her mother. Nicolino discusses her frustrations about her clients with her friend Clayton.
7	"Swimming Up Stream"	April 15, 2013	0.54
Huemer's consultation with a fertility doctor ends with some troubling news. During therapy, Huemer learns that her ex-Playboy client is recently engaged to a mysterious ex-boyfriend. Nicolino sets her client up on dates to see his interaction with women. Later, Nicolino attends a plastic surgeon appointment to oversee her options for a breast reduction. Dr. Greg's client comes to couples therapy by herself.
8	"Final Thoughts"	April 22, 2013	0.68
Nicolino and Matthew enjoy a romantic getaway to Palm Springs but back at home, Nicolino's father is instilling some unorthodox babysitting rules. Dr. Greg's sisters leave a troubling voicemail on the morning of his wedding. While friends and family begin to arrive, Greg is unsure if he can move on with the wedding without his family there. Huemer and Clayton anxiously await her fertility test results and round up the family to make an announcement.
