= FreedomFi =

Cellular networking company

- Industry: Telecommunications
- Products: Wireless gateways; 5G small cells; CBRS equipment
- Website: freedomfi.com

FreedomFi is a company for cellular networking.

== Gateway ==
The FreedomFi Gateway is a x86 device which functions as a Wireless LAN (stylized as LoRaLAN: Long Range Local Area Network) node in a 4G+5G network for the Internet of Things (IoT).

== Helium ==
FreedomFi has partnered with the Helium network blockchain (ticker symbol "HNT") to expand its coverage; HNT is awarded as an incentive.
