= Work Out New York =

American reality television series

- Genre: Reality television
- Starring: Lindsey Clayton; Joe Lazo; Layla Luciano; Lena Marti; Noah Neiman; Courtney Paul; Holly Rilinger
- Country of origin: United States
- Original language: English
- No. of seasons: 1
- No. of episodes: 8

Production
- Executive producers: Kate Little; Claire Poyser; Derek McLean; Stephen Lambert; Eli Holzman; Jacob Cohen-Holmes; Tess Gamboa; John Platt; Matt Weber; Omid Kahangi
- Running time: 42 minutes
- Production companies: Lime Pictures; All3 Media America

Original release
- Network: Bravo
- Release: December 6, 2015 – January 31, 2016

Related
- Work Out

Work Out New York is an American reality television series that premiered on December 6, 2015, on Bravo. Announced in April 2014 as The Fit Club, the reality series follows fitness trainers working in New York City who all compete in order to attract wealthy and famous clients. The final episode of season 1 aired on January 31, 2016, with 732,000 viewers.

== Episodes ==
No.	Title	Original release date	U.S. viewers (millions)
1	"Survival of the Fittest"	December 6, 2015	0.80
2	"Feel the Burn"	December 13, 2015	0.76
3	"Spot Me, Bro!"	December 20, 2015	0.48
4	"Cry of the Tiger"	December 27, 2015	0.50
5	"Cold Shoulder Press"	January 10, 2016	0.81
6	"Simply the Best"	January 17, 2016	0.80
7	"Dead Weight"	January 24, 2016	0.72
8	"The Finish Line"	January 31, 2016	0.73

== Broadcast ==
Internationally, the series premiered in Australia on Arena on December 7, 2015.
