= Eat, Drink, Love =

American reality television series

- Genre: Reality television
- Starring: Brenda Urban; Jessica Miller; Kat Odell; Nina Clemente; Waylynn Lucas
- Country of origin: United States
- Original language: English
- No. of seasons: 1
- No. of episodes: 8

Production
- Executive producers: Ben Hurvitz; Bob Gillan; Drew Brown; Nadine Rajabi; Tess Gamboa
- Running time: 42 minutes
- Production company: Brownstone Entertainment

Original release
- Network: Bravo
- Release: August 11 – September 26, 2013

Eat, Drink, Love is an American reality television series on Bravo that premiered on August 11, 2013. The show did not return for a second season.

== Premise ==
Eat, Drink, Love chronicles the lives of five women in the same social circle, the Los Angeles culinary world. It follows the women through their various business ventures and as they look for possible future husbands.

== Cast ==
- Nina Clemente, a 31-year-old private cooking instructor and caterer. She is the daughter of the painter Francesco Clemente and has a degree in anthropology from Brown University.
- Waylynn Lucas, a 32-year-old pastry chef, who has been engaged twice
- Jessica Miller, a culinary marketing specialist
- Kat Odell, a 29-year-old culinary magazine editor
- Brenda Urban, a culinary publicist

== Episodes ==
No.	Title	Original release date	U.S. viewers (millions)
1	"For Starters"	August 11, 2013	0.60
2	"Hanging Out With the Big Boys"	August 18, 2013	0.51
3	"Show & Tells a Lot"	August 25, 2013	0.53
4	"Reputation Is Everything"	August 29, 2013	0.32
5	"Bottle Shock"	September 5, 2013	0.29
6	"Palate Cleanser"	September 12, 2013	N/A
7	"Taste Test"	September 19, 2013	N/A
8	"The Final Course"	September 26, 2013	N/A

== Reception ==
Besha Rodell of LA Weekly says the show is more Real Housewife than Top Chef, adding that it perpetuate a lot of stereotypes. Melissa Camcho of Common Sense Media gave the show 3 stars out of 5.
