= My Fab 40th =

- Genre: Reality television
- Country of origin: United States
- Original language: English
- No. of seasons: 1
- No. of episodes: 6

Production
- Executive producers: Thom Beers; Matt Anderson; Nate Green; Maty Buss; Richard Courtney; Pamela Gimenez
- Camera setup: Multiple
- Running time: 42 minutes
- Production companies: FremantleMedia North America; Purveyors of Pop

Original release
- Network: Bravo
- Release: August 25 – September 29, 2015

My Fab 40th is an American reality television series that premiered on the Bravo cable network on August 25, 2015. Announced in March 2015, the six-part one-hour series chronicles various "from unlimited budgets to lavish delicacies and over-the-top entertainment" fortieth birthday celebrations, with each episode featuring different people.

== Episodes ==
No.	Title	Original release date	U.S. viewers (millions)
1	"Forty, Fierce, and Fabulous"	August 25, 2015	0.48
Former sorority sisters Francine Sanchez and Julie Marcus-Downs decide to throw a joint birthday party.
2	"The Fast and the 40th"	September 1, 2015	0.50
Brandy Flores, a single mother, hopes that her boyfriend would propose to her on the birthday.
3	"Coming Out At Forty"	September 8, 2015	0.48
Single dad, Carmine Sabatella, celebrates his new life as a gay man.
4	"Surprise, You’re Forty!"	September 15, 2015	0.48
Brian Malcolm and Stephen Harbaugh throw a double-surprise birthday party to their wives, Abbey and Gina.
5	"The Conscious Uncoupling"	September 22, 2015	0.37
Ryan Fisher celebrates his birthday with a bunch of Hollywood A-listers.
6	"Forty, I do!"	September 29, 2015	0.53
Notoya Green and her husband, Fred Mwangaguhunga, celebrate their birthday in a very expensive party and decide to additionally renew their wows.
