= Texicanas =

American reality television series

- Country of origin: United States
- Original language: English
- No. of seasons: 1
- No. of episodes: 7

Original release
- Network: Bravo
- Release: May 7 – June 25, 2019

Texicanas is an American reality television series that premiered May 7, 2019 and airs on Bravo. The show follows a group of women with Mexican heritage living in San Antonio, Texas.

== Cast ==
- Penny Ayarzagoitia
- Mayra Farret
- Lorena Martinez
- Anayancy Nolasco
- Karla Ramirez
- Luz Ortiz

== Episodes ==
No.	Title	Original release date	US viewers (millions)
1	"Two Months Earlier"	May 7, 2019	0.47
Mayra hosts the ultimate Cinco de Mayo bash in San Antonio and is taken aback by Luz's strong judgements of her. Penny, meanwhile, proclaims she doesn't care who judges her; and Mayra's close amigas Lorena and Karla, try to get to know Luz better, while Mayra offers Anayancy help with planning a charity event. Later a fun girls' night out leads to one amiga totally crossing the line.
2	"Mind Over Matter"	May 14, 2019	0.39
The drama at girls' night continues, leaving Luz and Mayra on the outs. Penny is conflicted with breaking Mexican tradition when it comes to matters of her son, while Lorena tries to teach her son how to drive. Later, the time has come for Luz, Penny, Anayancy and Karla to run the Spartan Race and after the first obstacle Karla realizes she is in way over her cabeza (head)
3	"Unfashionable Behavior"	May 21, 2019	0.37
Karla, Lorena, Mayra and their families enjoy a beautiful Mariachi Mass, but at a post church lunch it's clear the tension between Luz and Mayra is now affecting everyone in the group. Elsewhere, Anayancy's US residency is expiring and while she struggles to fill out her citizenship application, Luz opens up about a citizenship story of her own. Later, Penny invites all the girls to a charity fashion show.
4	"The Truce"	May 28, 2019	0.36
Mayra and her son discover their "inner artist," while Luz hosts the other women for a concealed handgun class. Lorena and Penny spend time with their moms, while Karla looks for a way to embrace her husband's Greek culture. Later, Lorena and Karla meet with Mayra to discuss the situation with Luz, which leads to the two ladies agreeing to sit down and hash out their differences.
5	"Birthday Bashing"	June 4, 2019	0.36
With Mayra's help, Lorena throws herself a beautiful birthday luncheon, but an emotional breakdown from Mayra puts her friendship with Karla at risk. Penny opens up about feeling judged and invites some of the ladies to a Pole dancing class, while Anayancy learns that studying for her citizenship test is harder than she thought. Later, Karla throws a Sip & See for her jewelry boutique and extends an invite to all the ladies, including Mayra.
6	"Text Mess"	June 11, 2019	0.41
Karla's and her husband throw a Havana Nights themed anniversary party for their night club, and it's clear that Karla is still upset with Mayra.
7	"Borderline Friendships"	June 18, 2019	0.32
Breakfast in Horseshoe Bay continues, and things get heated when the women unleash months of pent up feelings they have towards Mayra. Completely shocked by the betrayal, Mayra is comforted by an unsuspected friend. Back in San Antonio, Penny gets advice that leads her to stick up for Mayra at Anayancy's charity event.
