= Toned Up =

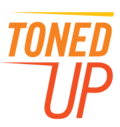
- Genre: Reality
- Starring: Karena Dawn; Katrina Hodgson
- Country of origin: United States
- Original language: English
- No. of seasons: 1
- No. of episodes: 8

Production
- Executive producers: Beth Greenwald; Bruce Gersh; Stephanie Bloch Chambers; Susan Levison; Vin Di Bona
- Running time: 22 minutes
- Production company: FishBowl Worldwide Media

Original release
- Network: Bravo
- Release: January 2 – February 6, 2014

Toned Up is an American reality television series that premiered on January 2, 2014, on Bravo. It follows the personal and professional lives of Katrina Hodgson and Karena Dawn, who have turned their makeshift beach workout videos into a business. The duo are best friends, business partners, and roommates in Manhattan Beach, California.

== Episodes ==
| No. | Title | Original release date | U.S. viewers (millions) |
|---|---|---|---|
| 1 | "Tone It Up or Down?" | January 2, 2014 | 0.52 |
| 2 | "A Perfect Fit for Procrastination" | January 9, 2014 | 0.58 |
| 3 | "Beach Babe or Bust" | January 16, 2014 | 0.53 |
| 4 | "Sink or Swim" | January 23, 2014 | 0.46 |
| 5 | "Two's Company but Three's a Crowd" | January 30, 2014 | 0.62 |
| 6 | "Change a Comin'" | January 30, 2014 | 0.51 |
| 7 | "Move Out or Move On" | February 6, 2014 | 0.54 |
| 8 | "Toned to Perfection" | February 6, 2014 | 0.65 |
