= Mother Funders =

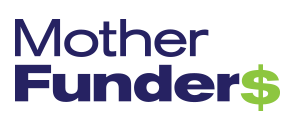
- Genre: Reality television
- Starring: Carla Stephens; Shayzon Prince; Robin Dyke; Amber Bryant; LaShon Thompson; Amber Coulter; Shana Koorse
- Country of origin: United States
- Original language: English
- No. of seasons: 1
- No. of episodes: 8

Production
- Executive producers: Steven Weinstock; Glenda Hersh; Lauren Eskelin; Jen Morton; Leola Westbrook; Betty Park
- Camera setup: Multiple
- Running time: 42 minutes
- Production company: True Entertainment

Original release
- Network: Bravo
- Release: June 14 – August 9, 2015

Mother Funders is an American reality television series that premiered on June 14, 2015, on Bravo. The show follows the members of Parent Teacher Organization in the small town of Locust Grove, Georgia, as they try to benefit their children's local elementary school by raising and donating money. Bravo aired a 30-minute preview special of the show on May 10, 2015.

== Cast ==
The cast of Mother Funders

- Carla Stephens is the president of the organization; her son is about to graduate from the school, thus it is her last year as the head of the organization.
- Shayzon Prince is the vice president, has been on the board for several years.
- Robin Dyke is the volunteer coordinator, does not get along well with Carla; always eager to find new ways to bring more money to the school.
- Amber Bryant is the honorary volunteer, married to a former NFL player; familiar with Atlanta's social scene, always brings a lot of money due to her connections.
- LaShon Thompson is the secretary, has recently joined the organization; has her own company and always open for new business ventures.
- Amber Coulter is the volunteer, the newest member to the organization; encouraged to join by her husband in order to get away from her normal life.
- Shana Koorse is the ex-board member and current volunteer.

== Episodes ==
No.	Title	Original release date	U.S. viewers (millions)
1	"Parent Teacher (Dis)Organization"	June 14, 2015	0.60
2	"Probationary Offenses/Parents Night Out"	June 21, 2015	0.55
3	"Fund-raising Hell"	July 5, 2015	0.55
4	"There Is No "I" in PTO"	July 12, 2015	0.51
5	"A Parent Organization Divided Cannot Stand"	July 19, 2015	0.56
6	"Fundraising Battle"	July 26, 2015	0.45
7	"PTO 2.0"	August 2, 2015	0.51
8	"Dropping the Mic"	August 9, 2015	0.57

== International broadcast ==
In Australia, the preview special premiered on June 22, 2015, on Arena.
