= Martyn Lawrence Bullard =

British interior designer

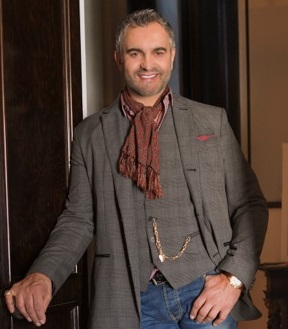
- Born: Martin Lawrence Bullard; 30 March 1967 (age 59); London, England
- Occupation: Interior designer
- Notable work: Live, Love & Decorate
- Television: Million Dollar Decorators Hollywood Me
- Awards: Andrew Martin International Interior Designer of the Year; Architectural Digest AD100; Elle Decor Top 25 Designers
- Website: martynlawrencebullard.com

Martyn Lawrence Bullard is an English interior designer based in Los Angeles.

== Early life ==
Born in Lewisham, London, Bullard began his career in design while in his teens. At 13, Bullard began to buy and sell what he called "oddments," and learned to identify decorator items that could be considered valuable or well-designed.

At 17, Bullard decided to pursue a career as an actor, and used his earnings to attend the Lee Strasberg Actors Studio in London's Covent Garden. While in school, Bullard continued to buy and sell antiques and raised enough money to move to Los Angeles in 1994.

== Career ==
=== Interior design ===
After moving to Los Angeles, Bullard was cast in several roles, including a part as Eartha Kitt's boy toy in Ed Wood's final film, I Woke Up Early The Day I Died. One of the film's producers visited Bullard's home, and, impressed by its decor, invited Bullard to decorate his office. From there, Bullard was hired to decorate the office and home of Liz Heller, a Capitol Records executive, and was eventually asked to help create Heller's wedding to producer John Bard Manulis. As a guest at the event, he was seated next to Cheryl Tiegs, who became his first celebrity client. Together, Tiegs and Bullard transformed Tiegs' Bel Air home into a "Balinese-inspired pavilion," which was featured in publications worldwide, and appeared on the cover of more than a dozen magazines. After his success with Cheryl Tiegs' house, Bullard began to build a celebrity clientele. His early clients included Rebecca Romijn and John Stamos, Christina Aguilera, William H. Macy and Felicity Huffman, Eva Mendes, Patti LaBelle, and Edward Norton. In more recent years, Bullard has gone on to decorate homes for Kylie Jenner, Khloe Kardashian, Kourtney Kardashian, Cher, Ellen Pompeo, Sharon and Ozzy Osbourne, Kid Rock, and Tommy Hilfiger, among many others. While best known for his high-end residential design, Bullard has also designed several premiere hospitality properties around the world including the Colony Palms Hotel, the Jimmy Choo boutiques in London and Osaka, Japan. as well as Château Gütsch Hotel in Lucerne, Switzerland. His most recent hospitality endeavors include The Sands Hotel in Indian Wells, California, Hotel Californian in Santa Barbara, The Residencies at Four Seasons Los Angeles, and the Whitley, a boutique hotel in Hollywood scheduled to open in early 2020.

In 2010, Bullard won the "Oscar of the Interior Design World," the Andrew Martin International Designer of the Year Award. Bullard also has two books published by Rizzoli, Live, Love & Decorate, reached its third reprint in its first 16 weeks of release, and topped the best-seller list in the interior design genre. The book featured 16 of Bullard's projects, including Cher's "fantasy villa," and Tamara Mellon's $30 million Manhattan penthouse. His second, "Design & Decoration", published in 2016, featured his own Palm Springs, California vacation home alongside 9 projects, giving readers a range of his style across both residential and commercial designs.

==== Style ====
Bullard's style has been described as "Hollywood glamour meets ethnic exotica," and "eclectic, luxurious, sophisticated, comfortable and fearless." He has been noted for his "adventurous use of texture, colour and extreme attention to detail," and his "strong command of proportion and scale, a deft hand with color and pattern, and an exuberantly global sensibility."

=== Television ===
From 2011 to 2013, Bullard starred in the hit Bravo series Million Dollar Decorators, examining the world of high-end interior designers. In a 2012 interview, Bullard, whose appearances on the show frequently feature his celebrity clients, said "Celebrities live their lives in the spotlight. As such, it's vital for their homes to be sanctuaries – places for complete relaxation and privacy. My one great joy with my celebrity clients over the years has been their passion to live out their fantasies, be it an Indian palace in Hollywood, a Tuscan villa in Malibu or an English country cottage in New York City. I'm here to be their enabler and make these fantasies into decorative reality."

Bullard also starred in Hollywood Me, a series which brought unsuspecting Brits to Los Angeles for personal makeovers while Bullard redecorated their homes. Hollywood Me, which won a National Reality Television Award in its inaugural season, launched in the UK in 2012 and aired in South Africa and Australia in 2013. He appears frequently on The Talk, and in Hollywood at Home design segments onThis Morning on ITV. Bullard portrayed himself on The Young and the Restless (2008 and 2012), and on the television series Jane By Design (2012). He was also featured on TLC's Material World in 2008. In 2020, he was special guest judge in the episode three of fifth season of RuPaul's Drag Race All Stars by VH1.

=== Other enterprises ===
In addition to his design studio, Martyn has created an eponymous collection of indoor and outdoor fabrics, wallpaper, furniture, and home accessories available through his firm. In 2010, Bullard introduced a fabric collection he designed in collaboration with Schumacher, a high-end interior design retailer; he won the UK Focus Best of the Best Fabric Designer Award in 2011 and 2012 for the collection, which features prints and wovens derived from antique textiles, motifs and patterns. Bullard went on to create his own signature fabric collection, with most recent collections including a high performance (woven) line that launched in October 2019, and a new collection planned to launch in Spring of 2020. Bullard has also collaborated with and designed tile lines for Ann Sacks, rugs with The Rug Company, a collection of dinnerware with porcelain maker Haviland Limoges, as well as collaborations with silver maker Christofle and crystal manufacturer Daum.

In the spring of 2017, Martyn opened his own atelier shop on Melrose Avenue in West Hollywood showcasing his most recent brand collaborations including his wallpaper line with Cole & Son, the launch of indoor and outdoor performance fabrics with textile giant Perennials, a lighting collection with Corbett, and a collection of home décor, home furnishings, and art with the leading home luxury multi-channel retailer, Frontgate. The three exclusive collections that Martyn has created with Frontgate are part of an ongoing, multi-year partnership with the retailer.

== Philanthropy ==
Bullard is actively involved with amfAR, the Sharon Osbourne Colon Cancer Program, P.S. Arts, and DIFFA (Design Industry Foundation Fighting AIDS). In 2013, Bullard was recruited by the Designer Dollhouse Showcase to design a dollhouse, which was auctioned to benefit the UCLA Children's Discovery and Innovation Institute at the Mattel Children's Hospital.

== Awards and recognition ==
- Andrew Martin International Interior Designer of the Year (2010)
- Architectural Digest AD 100 (2019, 2018, 2017, 2016, 2014, 2013, 2012, 2011, 2010, 2009, 2008, 2007, 2006, 2005)
- Elle Decor A List (2019, 2018, 2017, 2016, 2015, 2014, 2013, 2012, 2011, 2010, 2009, 2008, 2007, 2006)
- Elle Decor Top 25 Interior Designers (2010)
- Gold Key Award, Best Guestroom Luxury, Hotel Californian (2018)
- Gold Key Awards, Best Hotel Suite Design, Hotel Californian (2018)
- Luxe Interiors + Designs Gold List (2012, 2018)
- Departures World's Best in Travel and Design; Most Influential Designers Working Today (2013)
- Architectural Design France Top 100 Designers in the World (2011, 2012, 2013)
- Architectural Design Russia Top 25 Designers in the World (2012, 2013)
- The Hollywood Reporter 25 Most Influential Designers in L.A. (2012)
- UK Focus: Best of the Best: Collection of the Year (Schumacher Collection), Focus Design, London (2012)
- Top 100 Designers in the World, Architectural Design France (2011)
- UK Focus Best of the Best: Fabric Designer, Focus Design, London (2011)
- Interior Designer of the Year, Andrew Martin International Design Awards (2010)
- Top 25 Interior Designers, Elle Décor (2010)
- Conde Nast Top American Tastemaker

== Bibliography ==
- Martyn Lawrence Bullard; photographed by Tim Street-Porter; Live, Love & Decorate;4 October 2011; Rizzolli; ISBN 978-0-8478-3676-5
- Martyn Lawrence Bullard; "Design & Decoration;" 17 May 2016; Rizzoli; ISBN 978-0-8478-4738-9
