= Après Ski =

American reality television series

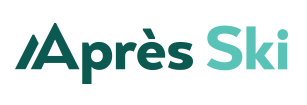
- Genre: Reality television
- Starring: Joey Gibbons; Bobby Crowder; Lynsey Dyer; Charlotte Fenton; Kendra Larkin; Tamara Moore; Jim Sced; Elise Wims
- Country of origin: United States
- Original language: English
- No. of seasons: 1
- No. of episodes: 8

Production
- Executive producers: Andrea Gorfolova; Jeff Hevert; Kevin Lee; Jameel Bharmal
- Running time: 42 minutes
- Production companies: Tricon Films & Television

Original release
- Network: Bravo
- Release: November 2 – December 21, 2015

Après Ski is an American reality television series that premiered on the Bravo cable network on November 2, 2015. Announced in June 2014, the series chronicles the personal and professional lives of a group of people working in a luxurious concierge company located in Whistler, British Columbia, a Canadian resort town.

== Episodes ==
No.	Title	Original release date	U.S. viewers (millions)
1	"No Business Like Snow Business"	November 2, 2015	0.47
2	"Cold Feet"	November 9, 2015	0.61
3	"Friends With Benefits"	November 16, 2015	0.51
4	"It's All Down Hill From Here"	November 23, 2015	0.55
5	"Sliding Down Hill"	November 30, 2015	0.56
6	"On Thin Ice"	December 7, 2015	0.59
7	"Power Moves"	December 14, 2015	0.63
8	"Last Run"	December 21, 2015	0.64

== Broadcast ==
The show premiered on November 2, 2015, in the United States on the Bravo cable network at 10/9 p.m. ET/PT, following the season premiere of Vanderpump Rules. Internationally, the series premiered in Australia on Arena within 24 hours of the American broadcast on November 3, 2015.
