= Blood, Sweat & Heels =

- Genre: Reality television
- Starring: Melyssa Ford; Demetria Lucas; Mica Hughes; Daisy Lewellyn; Geneva S. Thomas; Brie Bythewood; Chantelle Fraser; Arzo Anwar
- Country of origin: United States
- Original language: English
- No. of seasons: 2
- No. of episodes: 21

Production
- Executive producers: Brent Montgomery; Caroline Self; David George; Dominick Pupa; Tess Gamboa
- Camera setup: Multiple
- Running time: 42 minutes
- Production company: Leftfield Pictures

Original release
- Network: Bravo
- Release: January 5, 2014 – June 14, 2015

Blood, Sweat & Heels is an American reality television series that premiered on January 5, 2014, on Bravo. It depicts the personal, professional, and social circle of several women who all reside in New York City.

The premiere episode of Blood, Sweat and Heels ranked as a network best for a series premiere on Bravo at that time, averaging 2.5 million viewers and 1.4 million in the adults 18-49 viewership demo. The cast of the first season included Melyssa Ford, Demetria Lucas, Brie Bythewood, Mica Hughes, Daisy Lewellyn, and Geneva S. Thomas. The season concluded on March 23, 2014, with a 90-minute reunion show. Brie Bythewood was dismissed from the series after the first season, and was replaced by two newcomers, Chantelle Fraser and Arzo Anwar.

In April 2014, Bravo renewed Blood, Sweat and Heels for a second season, which premiered on March 29, 2015.

On April 8, 2016, series star Daisy Lewellyn died after battling bile duct cancer. She was 36. She learned of the disease in 2015, after makeup artists noticed an unusual coloring in her eye. In the season two finale, she celebrated completing her radiation treatments.

== Cast ==
- Melyssa Ford
- Demetria Lucas
- Mica Hughes
- Geneva S. Thomas
- Daisy Lewellyn
- Brie Bythewood (season 1)
- Chantelle Fraser (season 2)
- Arzo Anwar (season 2)

== Episodes ==
=== Series overview ===
Season	Episodes	Originally released	
Season	Episodes	First released	Last released
1	10	January 5, 2014	March 23, 2014
2	11	March 29, 2015	June 14, 2015

=== Season 1 (2014) ===
No. overall	No. in season	Title	Original release date	US viewers (millions)
1	1	"Six in the City"	January 5, 2014	2.47
Daisy hosts an afternoon tea party, where a conversation regarding relationships changes the mood for the worse. Demetria blogs her experience regarding the party and the other ladies discover what she had written.
2	2	"Blog is a Four-Letter Word"	January 12, 2014	1.86
Melyssa and her boss get into an argument that may jeopardize her new career. Daisy ends up being late for a date. Mica brings the ladies together by hosting a dinner party.
3	3	"Turned Uptown"	January 19, 2014	1.42
Geneva's antics put her reputation on the line. Daisy's father comes over to give her some much needed advice.
4	4	"Papa, Can You Hear Me?"	January 26, 2014	1.22
Demetria, Geneva, Mica, and Brie have a girls getaway in The Hamptons. Daisy has to explain her schedule to her newly hired assistant. Mica is told some shocking news.
5	5	"Detox, Dear, Detox"	February 9, 2014	2.27
While on the girls trip in the Hamptons, Mica has an emotional breakdown. Melyssa is in financial distress.
6	6	"Louds and Prouds"	February 16, 2014	1.87
Brie and Mica have a verbal altercation. Demetria and Greg sit down for a serious conversation.
7	7	"Cocktail Wishes and Champagne Nightmares"	February 23, 2014	1.77
Mica's mother pressures Mica and Terry to get married. Daisy extends an invitation to the ladies for her book launch. Geneva and Mica end up in a brawl.
8	8	"Giving Some and Getting Some"	March 9, 2014	1.46
Demetria invites all the ladies to her event, where Daisy makes a surprise appearance. Melyssa becomes nervous when her boss requests a sudden meeting. Mica receives some shocking news. Geneva meets up with one of her exes.
9	9	"Heels on the Hudson"	March 16, 2014	1.97
Mica wants to improve her modeling agency. Demetria wants to focus on her relationship more. Melyssa feels that she's ready to keep her real estate job. The group meets up on a yacht.
10	10	"Reunion"	March 23, 2014	1.56
In the 90 minute Blood, Sweat & Heels first season reunion, Andy Cohen sits down with the ladies to discuss what went down.

=== Season 2 (2015) ===
No. overall	No. in season	Title	Original release date	US viewers (millions)
11	1	"Secrets And The City"	March 29, 2015	1.32
Melyssa Ford reminisces about her past. Demetria Lucas D'Oyley is about to release another book while Daisy Lewellyn tells a shocking secret to her friends.
12	2	"For Vixens..."	April 5, 2015	0.95
13	3	"Match Made in Heel"	April 12, 2015	1.00
14	4	"Pop Goes the Runway"	April 19, 2015	1.02
15	5	"A Heel In Handcuffs"	April 26, 2015	0.99
16	6	"For Love or Family"	May 3, 2015	1.14
17	7	"Turned Up and Kicked Out"	May 10, 2015	1.08
18	8	"(don't) Save The Date!"	May 17, 2015	0.92
19	9	"A Few Bad Apples"	May 31, 2015	0.95
20	10	"Prayers for Daisy"	June 7, 2015	0.93
21	11	"Happily Never After"	June 14, 2015	0.67
