= Game of Crowns =

- Genre: Reality television
- Starring: Shelley Carbone; Lynne Diamante; Leha Guilmette; Lori-Ann Marchese; Susanna Paliotta; Vanassa Sebastian
- Country of origin: United States
- Original language: English
- No. of seasons: 1
- No. of episodes: 10

Production
- Executive producers: Pamela Healey; Lisa Shannon; Dan Peirson; Tess Gamboa
- Camera setup: Multiple
- Running time: 42 minutes
- Production company: Shed Media US

Original release
- Network: Bravo
- Release: July 13 – September 11, 2014

Game of Crowns is an American reality television series on Bravo that premiered on July 13, 2014. Announced in July 2013, the show follows six women who are involved in the beauty pageant business. The series concluded on September 11, 2014.

== Premise ==
The reality television series features six wives who have won state contests in the Mrs. America contest or otherwise been involved in various beauty pageants around the country. The docu-series follows the daily life of the women and their families, mostly focussing on how they prepare for the pageants, including them "obsessing over the perfect swimsuit, working tirelessly with trainers and honing their interview skills with coaches – all while being dedicated mothers and wives."

== Cast ==
The cast of Game of Crowns, from left: Carbone, Diamante, Guilmette, Paliotta, March and Sebastian.

- Shelley Carbone has won the title of Mrs. Connecticut 2010 before going on to compete for the title of Mrs. America 2011. She lives in Wethersfield, Connecticut with her husband and their four children. Shelley is a registered nurse, although her full-time job is being a mother. Shelley got into pageant world as her mother secretly registered Shelley to compete in her first pageant.
- Lynne Diamante holds a title of Mrs. Rhode Island 2013 and also competed for the 2013 Mrs. America Pageant. Lynne is attorney as well as the CEO and founder of OPTX Rhode Island, luxury eyeglasses and sunglasses retailer. She also occasionally consults for celebrity clientele and industry elite. Traveling is the biggest Lynne's passion, especially with her husband and daughter around.
- Leha Guilmette is Mrs. Rhode Island 2013 and has competed in Mrs. America Pageant. She lives in Cranston in Rhode Island with her husband, a police officer, and their two children. Besides family being her main prioriority, Leha has a full-time job as an account manager and recruiter working with several Fortune 500 companies.
- Lori-Ann Marchese is a professional trainer and fitness consultant as well as a fitness cover model residing in Berlin, Connecticut. She owns a fitness facility called Body Construct LLC and has a line of Body Construct Nutrition Supplements. Lori-Ann was crowned as Mrs. Connecticut in 2013 and has recently competed in various fitness pageants.
- Susanna Paliotta is a successful business woman residing in Johnston, Rhode Island. She ows Bound by The Crown Couture, a clothing brand for children. Susanna is married, has two children. She also has a pilot’s license and wrote a children's book Isabella Goes to the City.
- Vanassa Sebastian was crowned Mrs. Connecticut 2012 and compete at Mrs. America, where she finished in the top ten. Residing in Ledyard, Connecticut, Vanassa is married to a successful businessman who, along with his family, owns one of the world's largest casinos, Foxwoods Resort & Casino.

== Episodes ==
No.	Title	Original release date
1	"Beauty Is Pain"	July 13, 2014
In the first episode of the series, all of the women are introduced. Lori-Ann Marchese prepares for Mrs. America with the help of Shelley Carbone and Vanassa Sebastian. Another contestants include Leha Guilmette and Susanna Paliotta who all feel to have what it takes to win.
2	"They Can't Shine Your Shoes"	July 20, 2014
Susanna, Vanassa, Shelley and Lynne all decide to make a bet on how well Lori-Ann and Leha are going to perform at Mrs. America pageant. However, the ladies soon forget about the wager as Leha's husband make gets wind of it in the audience, inducing various abusive remarks.
3	"Apple Trees Don't Grow Pears"	July 27, 2014
Susanna, Lynne and Shelley deal with aftermath of what happened during the pageant. Leha's husband is accused of making alleged violent threat which other people failed to recall. Leha and Lynne confront each other face-to-face which might end up in breaking up their friendship forever.
4	"Loser's Buffet"	July 28, 2014
Shelley and Vanassa admit trash-talking Leha. Lynne thinks over her annual vow renewal and starts preparing for her anniversary. Meanwhile, Vanassa doesn't feel confident about competing in the upcoming pageant and Lori-Ann spends time working out to in order to prepare better.
5	"Unladylike Behavior"	August 3, 2014
Susanna, Lori-Ann, and Lynne get closer as they deal with a common frenemy while Shelley helps Vanassa and Lynne to work on their relationship. Shelley later arranges a bonding trip to Newport. The things get heated when Leha gets a call from Nick telling her that someone hired a private investigator to follow their family.
6	"Circus Display of Affection"	August 10, 2014
Shelley has a tough decision to make whether to attend Lynne’s wedding or Vanassa’s breast cancer walk. Lynne renews the vows for her 15th anniversary hoping to cover the haunting memories of her original wedding day. Leha shows up to Vanassa's cancer event to support her.
7	"Tight and Right"	August 17, 2014
Ladies to prepare for The Legends of the Crowns pageant. Shelley gets especially nervous about diminishing her Mrs. America title in case she doesn't win. Leha takes out a temporary restraining order against Lynne. Vanassa is worried about her health before her annual breast cancer exam.
8	"The Legends of the Crowns"	August 24, 2014
It is still unclear whether Leha or Lynne can compete at the Legends of the Crown pageant due to the recent temporary restraining order. Vanassa gets another opportunity to defeat the former Mrs. America, Shelley, who has been in the pageant game for a long time.
9	"Bound by the Crown"	August 31, 2014
The series finale. The winner of The Legends of the Crown is announced. Lynne and Leha both go to court to settle the temporary restraining. Vanassa finds out that she is in a perfect health condition and visits a plastic surgeon. Leha confronts Lynne about all the allegations and accusations.
10	"Secrets Revealed"	September 11, 2014
The special bonus episode featuring never-before-seen footage.

== Reception ==
Mark Perigard from Boston Herald was very critical towards the show for its negativity. Giving the show a D, he added that the "women go on the defensive in the most vile way, alleging abuse and death threats, the sort of smears that could wreck a police officer’s career," and raising a question whether "repeated Botox use lead to brain damage." Amy Kuperinsky from The Star-Ledger gave the show a B and compared it to another reality series aired on the same network, The Real Housewives of New Jersey, also adding that a viewer would "find the same kind of conflicts — your standard-issue threats, kerfuffles over the trivial, and a healthy dose of regional accents."
