= Million Dollar Decorators =

- Mary McDonald, Jeffrey Alan Marks, Nathan Turner, Kathryn Ireland, and Martyn Lawrence Bullard (from left)
- Genre: Reality
- Starring: Jeffrey Alan Marks; Mary McDonald; Kathryn Ireland; Martyn Lawrence Bullard; Nathan Turner
- Country of origin: United States
- No. of seasons: 2
- No. of episodes: 16

Production
- Executive producers: Brittany Lovett; Ed Lavelle; Fred Pichel; Lyle Gamm; Rich Bye; Talia Lesak
- Running time: 40–43 minutes
- Production company: Goodbye Pictures

Original release
- Network: Bravo
- Release: May 31, 2011 – January 8, 2013

Million Dollar Decorators is an American reality television series that premiered May 31, 2011, on Bravo. Million Dollar Decorators follows interior designers — Martyn Lawrence Bullard, Kathryn Ireland, Jeffrey Alan Marks, and Mary McDonald — who take on A-list clientele and attempt to keep up in the stressful design industry.

== Episodes ==
=== Series overview ===
Season	Episodes	Originally released	
Season	Episodes	First released	Last released
1	8	May 31, 2011	July 19, 2011
2	8	November 13, 2012	January 8, 2013

=== Season 1 (2011) ===
No. overall	No. in season	Title	Original release date	U.S. viewers (millions)
1	1	"Darlings of Design"	May 31, 2011	0.78
2	2	"Playgrounds for the Rich"	June 7, 2011	N/A
3	3	"Life Is a Beach"	June 14, 2011	0.55
4	4	"Client Control"	June 21, 2011	0.64
5	5	"Designed for Disaster"	June 28, 2011	0.51
Note: Daisy Fuentes makes a guest appearance in this episode.
6	6	"London Calling"	July 5, 2011	0.55
7	7	"The Suite Life"	July 12, 2011	0.65
8	8	"Installment Insanity"	July 19, 2011	0.57
Note: Sharon Osbourne makes a guest appearance in this episode.

=== Season 2 (2012–13) ===
No. overall	No. in season	Title	Original release date	U.S. viewers (millions)
9	1	"Deadlines, Wine, and High Design"	November 13, 2012	0.74
10	2	"Partners in Pink"	November 20, 2012	0.61
Note: Amber Valletta makes a guest appearance in this episode.
11	3	"Frenemies"	November 27, 2012	0.59
12	4	"Creative Clash"	December 4, 2012	0.43
13	5	"Explosive Reveals"	December 11, 2012	0.62
Note: Stacey Dash makes a guest appearance in this episode.
14	6	"Mansion Madness"	December 18, 2012	0.63
15	7	"Designer to the Stars"	January 1, 2013	0.76
16	8	"The Finishing Touch"	January 8, 2013	0.79
Note: Lindsay Lohan makes a guest appearance in this episode.
