= Secrets and Wives =

- Genre: Reality television
- Starring: Andi Black; Susan Doneson; Cori Goldfarb; Gail Greenberg; Amy Miller; Liza Sandler
- Country of origin: United States
- Original language: English
- No. of seasons: 1
- No. of episodes: 8

Production
- Executive producers: Aaron Rothman; Irad Eyal; Michaline Babich; Omid Kahangi; Michael Call
- Camera setup: Multiple
- Running time: 42 minutes
- Production company: Haymaker

Original release
- Network: Bravo
- Release: June 2 – July 21, 2015

Secrets and Wives is an American reality television series that premiered on June 2, 2015, on Bravo. The series was greenlit by Bravo in July 2014. The docu-series chronicles the life of six women who all grew up on Long Island and follows them as they go through the challenges of marriage and divorce. The women are described as a "tight-knit, ultra-wealthy group of friends and rivals who know everything about each other."

The series resembles the series The Real Housewives, which airs on the same network. One of the cast members, Andi Black, explains the difference by saying that "we've [the cast] all known each other for 20 to 30 years." She emphasizes the fact that they are all long-time girlfriends and have always been involved in each other's life. "When the camera stops rolling, we're still talking about the same issue," she also added.

The show was not renewed for a second season.

== Cast ==
- Andi Black
- Susan Doneson
- Cori Goldfarb
- Gail Greenberg
- Amy Miller
  - Max Miller (Amy's son; Episodes 6, 8)
- Liza Sandler

== Episodes ==
No.	Title	Original release date	US viewers (millions)
1	"Say Yes to the Distress"	June 2, 2015	0.56
The women go through the pitfalls of marriage and divorce. Things get heated as Susan's ex-husband shows up to a Plastic Surgery Fashion Show organized by Gail and her husband. Liza works on her post-divorce life.
2	"Weekend at Gurney's"	June 9, 2015	0.50
The women gather in The Hamptons to get away from the heat. Amy avoids fixing her relationship with her fiancé. Cori's marriage is challenged by her business ventures. Susan judges Liza's life choices.
3	"Look Who's Mantauking Too!"	June 16, 2015	0.47
4	"Nothin' But a V-Thing"	June 23, 2015	0.57
5	"Flock of Sea-Gals"	June 30, 2015	0.32
6	"There's Thumb-Thing About Liza"	July 7, 2015	0.53
7	"Sue's The Boss?"	July 14, 2015	0.52
8	"Burning Down the House"	July 21, 2015	0.53

== Broadcast ==
Internationally, the series premiered in Australia on September 8, 2015 on Arena.

== Reception ==
Verne Gay from Newsday wrote a negative review about the show by saying that "the ladies seem like fun, the show not so much."
