= Tour Group =

- Genre: Reality television
- Starring: Brandon Presser; Rachel Grant; Sandhurst Miggins
- Country of origin: United States
- Original language: English
- No. of seasons: 1
- No. of episodes: 10

Production
- Executive producers: Will Macdonald; Jason Crosby; Amy Chacon; Michael Meinecke
- Running time: 42 minutes
- Production company: Monkey Kingdom (production company)

Original release
- Network: Bravo
- Release: March 1 – June 28, 2016

Tour Group is an American reality television series that premiered on March 1, 2016, on Bravo. Announced in April 2014, the docu-series follows a group of people leading by three expert tour guides as they travel around the world visiting locations in Morocco, Kenya, the Maldives, Sri Lanka, Thailand and Japan.

== Episodes ==
| No. | Title | Original release date |
|---|---|---|
| 1 | "Not in Georgia Anymore" | March 1, 2016 |
| 2 | "The True Meaning of Camel Toe" | March 8, 2016 |
| 3 | "Going Ape S..." | May 10, 2016 |
| 4 | "One Wedding and a Bat Erection" | May 17, 2016 |
| 5 | "Sri You Next Tuesday" | May 24, 2016 |
| 6 | "Tantra? I Hardly Know Ya" | May 31, 2016 |
| 7 | "Not So Happy Endings" | June 7, 2016 |
| 8 | "The Elephant in the Room" | June 14, 2016 |
| 9 | "Maids, Hooters, and Condoms, Oh My!" | June 21, 2016 |
| 10 | "So Long, Farewell, Sayonara" | June 28, 2016 |
