= Princesses: Long Island =

- Genre: Reality
- Starring: Amanda Bertoncini; Ashlee White; Casey Cohen; Chanel "Coco" Omari; Erica Gimbel; Joey Lauren
- Opening theme: "Baby Come Home" by the Scissor Sisters
- Country of origin: United States
- Original language: English
- No. of seasons: 1
- No. of episodes: 10

Production
- Executive producers: Glenda Hersh; Lauren Eskelin; Lenid Rolov; Noah Samton; Steven Weinstock
- Running time: 40 to 43 minutes
- Production company: True Entertainment

Original release
- Network: Bravo
- Release: June 2 – August 4, 2013

Princesses: Long Island is an American reality television series on Bravo that premiered on June 2, 2013. The series later was canceled after airing only one season.

== Synopsis ==
Princesses: Long Island chronicles six young Jewish American Princesses from the Boomerang Generation who reside at home with their parents in various communities on Long Island. It follows the group as they go out on the social scene, look for their future husbands, as well as drama within the group. Cast member Chanel "Coco" Omari says in the premiere episode that "when you are Jewish, live on Long Island, are 27, and are still living at home, it's time to panic."

== Cast ==
Erica Gimbel, Chanel "Coco" Omari, Amanda Bertoncini, Casey Cohen, Joey Lauren and Ashlee White (from left)

- Amanda Bertoncini — Age 27: Resides in Great Neck
- Ashlee White — Age 30: Resides in Roslyn
- Casey Cohen — Age 28: Resides part-time in Jericho, part-time in Manhattan
- Chanel "Coco" Omari — Age 28: Resides in Great Neck
- Erica Gimbel — Age 29: Resides in Old Westbury
- Joey Lauren — Age 30: Resides in Freeport

== Episodes ==
No.	Title	Original release date	U.S. viewers (millions)
1	"You Had Me at Shalom"	June 2, 2013	1.24
Chanel sits down with her Modern Orthodox family for a shabbat dinner, where she is reminded that it's time for her to get married. Amanda goes on a date with her older boyfriend Jeff, and attempts to keep her mother from inviting herself. Ashlee and her father go get manicures and pedicures. Later, after experiencing culture shock while driving on the South Shore, Ashlee meets up with Joey to go shopping for her 30th birthday celebration dress. Erica invites the girls over for her pool party— where drama erupts.
2	"Shabbocalypse Now"	June 9, 2013	0.88
Chanel and Ashlee drive into the city to meet up with Casey. Joey confronts Amanda after the altercation at the pool party. Casey reveals her past with Erica, and is now trying to put the past behind her for the girls' upcoming Hamptons trip. During this week's Shabbat dinner at Chanel's, Casey lets her anger get the best of her.
3	"Saved by the Boys"	June 16, 2013	0.78
Casey and Erica try to resolve their issues but are unable to reach a resolution. Amanda doesn't want to be involved with the drama so she flees to a hotel with Jeff. Chanel, Casey, Joey and Ashlee scope out the men at brunch, but the attractive ones seem to have sour personalities. The group heads to a daytime party where Joey and Ashlee disagree about each others flirting techniques. Rob rescues Erica, but he's unable to control her overbearing partying ways when drama erupts — which has the other girls shocked and worried.
4	"Mr. Wrongs Don't Make a Right"	June 23, 2013	0.92
The girls celebrate Ashlee's 30th birthday by heading to a club located within a strip mall. Chanel is shocked when her ex-boyfriend shows up at her house looking for answers. Ashlee, Joey, Chanel, and Casey have a girls weekend getaway at a Jewish singles camp in Connecticut, but an incoming storm puts a damper on their plans. While back on Long Island, Amanda and her mother go with Erica to a club — where Erica is ready to let loose.
5	"Intermenschion"	June 30, 2013	0.73
After the confrontation with her ex, Amanda takes Chanel for a night out in order to lift her spirits. Erica continues to fall through with her plans, which leads Chanel to conclude that their friendship is failing due to Erica's drinking. Casey is willing to help Erica, but she is unwilling to take the advice. Joey and Amanda stay out of the drama by working while Ashlee indulges in a few dates.
6	"Coco Loco"	July 7, 2013	0.92
Ashlee, Joey and Casey are willing to try anything in order to find the perfect Jewish man, so they take a chance by speed dating. Like any place the girls go, drama seems to find its way between Joey and Ashlee. Amanda is spending her time planning a white party to launch the Drink Hanky. Chanel and her little sister go wedding dress shopping, which fuels her want for a husband. Drama erupts at the party as Chanel throws hands with a fellow partygoer, and Joey becomes fed up with Ashlee's mean girl behavior.
7	"Who Are You, the Pope?"	July 14, 2013	0.86
Chanel, embarrassed after her behavior at the party, visits her rabbi for some spiritual healing. Erica and Rob's relationship becomes quite real when the two shop for a home. Ashlee and Joey get into another argument once Joey learns that Ashlee is gossiping behind her back to the group. Fed up with it all, Joey ends up confronting Ashlee about what she has done and things get worse.
8	"Always a Bridesmaid"	July 21, 2013	0.88
Joey's father gives her a ninety-day deadline to move out of the house. Meanwhile, Chanel is going through a shakeup of her own as her younger sister's wedding date has arrived, and it's a classic Great Neck modern orthodox Jewish wedding.
9	"The Elephant in the Vineyard"	July 28, 2013	0.79
Erica invites the group for a day of wine tasting out east and going out on her father’s boat. Erica thought this would be a great way to bring all the girls together, but it actually ended up tearing them apart. Erica began to worry that the drama between Ashlee and Joey would explode on her father’s boat, so she took matters into her own hands and addressed the tension between the two of them at the vineyard. Ashlee and Joey started bickering back and forth once again. After begging her parents to charter her a private plane back to Roslyn, Ashlee runs off and gets lost.
10	"Sunrise, Sunset"	August 4, 2013	0.89
Amanda, Erica, and Joey spend the day on Erica's father's boat, while Chanel stays behind to look for Ashlee. The girls get a text that Ashlee is in the hospital. The group is still divided between due to the argument between Joey and Ashlee. All the broken friendships around Chanel cause her to attempt to fix everything. As Rosh Hashanah comes closer, Chanel plans to bring all of the Princesses together to a Tashlikh in order to cast away their previous sins.

== Reception ==
"As horrifying as it is in most ways, Princesses is actually obsessively watchable", The A.V. Club's Eric Thurm wrote: "As someone who has in fact been described as a Nice Jewish Boy, it’s easy for me to find most of the princess’ attempts at Judaism funny. I'll admit, I know a few people from the area who are in fact worse than any of the princesses". Thurm concluded that "Princesses is probably a 'B' for entertainment value but a 'D' for how appalling it is".

Religion News Service's Corrie Mitchell cited rabbis and other Jews, including Representative Steve Israel (D-NY), who denounced the show for allegedly promoting anti-Semitic stereotypes of Jews. Lilit Marcus of The Jewish Forward wrote that "Anti-Semitism existed long before reality TV ever did, and it will probably continue existing when reality TV is a relic of history ... Italian-Americans survived Jersey Shore. African-Americans survived The Real Housewives of Atlanta. Vapid pharmaceutical sales reps survived The Bachelor. We’re going to be just fine".
