= Gallery Girls =

- Genre: Reality television
- Starring: Liz Margulies; Kerri Lisa; Chantal Chadwick; Claudia Reardon; Angela Pham; Amy Poliakoff; Maggie Schaffer
- Theme music composer: Chris Alan Lee
- Country of origin: United States
- No. of seasons: 1
- No. of episodes: 8

Production
- Executive producers: Alexandra Lipsitz; Dan Cutforth; Jane Lipsitz; Kris Lindquist
- Running time: 42 minutes
- Production company: Magical Elves Productions

Original release
- Network: Bravo
- Release: August 13 – October 1, 2012

Gallery Girls is an American reality television series on Bravo created by Steven Townsend and Joshua Mamann. The series premiered on August 13, 2012.

== Premise ==
The series follows several weeks in the lives of seven ambitious young women in New York City who struggle with the intense environment of the art world while attempting to find their "dream jobs". The group shares a passion for art, but they're divided between their Manhattan and Brooklyn lifestyles, with different views and tastes toward art, men, and fashion. Throughout the series, the ladies tackle financial setbacks, family issues, and the pressures of jump-starting their lives.

Bravo did not renew the show for a second season.

== Cast ==
- Liz Margulies
- Kerri Lisa
- Chantal Chadwick
- Claudia Reardon
- Angela Pham
- Amy Poliakoff
- Maggie Schaffer

== Episodes ==
No.	Title	Original release date	US viewers (millions)
1	"All Tomorrow's Parties"	August 13, 2012	0.550
Chantal and Claudia launch their art gallery, while Angela tries to focus on a career in photography and Kerri gets an internship.
2	"What Goes On"	August 20, 2012	0.550
Claudia must clean up after the End of the Century opening with Chantal, but Chantal shows up two hours late and leaves early. Kerri is assigned odd tasks for her internship.
3	"Wild Child"	August 27, 2012	0.668
Kerri and Amy scout a high-class art show, while high tensions arise when Liz endures dinner with her biological father; Maggie gets dragged into a heated exchange.
4	"I'm Not Sorry"	September 3, 2012	0.512
Maggie has fun celebrating her birthday but her boyfriend's drunken friends ruin the night, while Angela has a hard time finding a location for her photo showing. Kerri has a housewarming party and is busy while she attempts to subdue the drama between Amy and Liz.
5	"I'm Set Free"	September 10, 2012	0.631
Claudia and Chantal team up to plan a big-named event with fringe artist Sucklord, while Maggie visits her family. Amy hosts a dinner party but it turns out to be a dud.
6	"Who Loves the Sun"	September 17, 2012	0.632
The girls head to Miami to attend Art Basel. Claudia and Chantal are up to their usual antics while they invite themselves to Liz's father's art party. Amy gets a career offer which sets her back, and she finds a gallery to host End of the Century's pop-up show in Miami.
7	"Beginning to See the Light"	September 24, 2012	0.637
Amy goes through hardship and her time in New York is greatly jeopardized. Liz faces Claudia and Chantal after several hard-to-handle encounters. Maggie shows up at the club with a crazy group of friends, which severely angers Liz.
8	"Wrap Your Trouble in Dreams"	October 1, 2012	0.537
In the season finale, Kerry has to decide between her job or an internship. Maggie believes she's achieved a secure job, and Chantal plans a move to Paris with her boyfriend.
