= Real Girlfriends in Paris =

- Genre: Reality television
- Starring: Anya Firestone; Emily Gorelik; Kacey Margo; Margaux Lignel; Adja Toure; Victoria Zito
- Country of origin: United States
- Original languages: English; French
- No. of seasons: 1
- No. of episodes: 10

Production
- Executive producers: Rich Bye; Rahel Tennione; Barrie Bernstein
- Production locations: Paris, France
- Camera setup: Multiple
- Production company: Goodbye Pictures

Original release
- Network: Bravo
- Release: September 5 – October 31, 2022

Real Girlfriends in Paris is an American reality television series that premiered on Bravo on September 5, 2022. The show features six twenty-something year old Americans living in Paris, while they try to find love, work and ultimately themselves.

== Cast ==
=== Main ===
- Anya Firestone
- Emily Gorelik
- Kacey Margo
- Margaux Lignel
- Adja Toure
- Victoria Zito

=== Recurring ===
- Yoanne Mobengo

== Episodes ==
No.	Title	Original release date	U.S. viewers (millions)
1	"Bonjour Paris!"	September 5, 2022	0.26
2	"Handball and Heartbreaks"	September 5, 2022	0.18
3	"Fromage a Trois"	September 12, 2022	0.17
4	"A Frites Accident"	September 19, 2022	0.20
5	"On Thin Ice"	September 26, 2022	0.13
6	"Yes We Cannes!"	October 3, 2022	0.20
7	"Un-Cannes-y Ending"	October 10, 2022	0.12
8	"Hanging by a Thread"	October 17, 2022	0.14
9	"Hello, Dali!"	October 24, 2022	0.15
10	"A Final Seine Off"	October 31, 2022	0.16
