= Homeless Not Toothless =

American dental organization

Homeless Not Toothless (HNT), founded by Dr. Jay Grossman in 1992, is a non-profit organization of dentists who volunteer their time and who either pay for laboratory expenses or work with labs who donate dental work. Homeless Not Toothless is committed to encouraging the health, care, and support for as many foster children as possible to have their dental needs met through a well-structured community of doctors and dentists. The organization received many of its patients through referrals by the Venice Family Clinic as well as local outreach programs. Now, referrals mostly come from the VA, local shelters and past clients/patients.

HNT hosted a fundraiser with actress Sharon Stone and writer/producer Antwone Fisher at the Smile for Every Child fundraiser on September 10, 2009. The event was held at the Shangri-La Hotel in Santa Monica. The goal of the fundraiser was to raise five million dollars to build a facility that will treat the homeless and foster children of Los Angeles County. As of October 15, 2009, the building has been fully funded and remodeled, and a remainder of one million dollars needs to be raised to fund completion of the dental clinic. The medical component of the facility has been completed and is open and running.

The fundraiser event attracted the support of many celebrities including Sharon Stone, Antwone Fisher, William H. Macy, Larry King, Todd Black and others. The program raised funds for the free El Monte Dental Clinic, which will allow the program's participating dentists to provide free dental care to 28,000 Los Angeles foster children.

Grossman, the CEO and founder since 1992, has received numerous awards for his philanthropy.

Current Board members include Jay Grossman, Dr. Briar Flicker-Grossman, Sharon Stone, Larry Bernstein, and A Slice of PR.
