= List of The Real Housewives of Salt Lake City episodes =

The Real Housewives of Salt Lake City is an American reality television series that premiered November 11, 2020, on Bravo. The series' seventh season chronicles the lives of seven women in and around Salt Lake City— Lisa Barlow, Mary Cosby, Heather Gay, Meredith Marks, Whitney Rose, Angie Katsanevas and Bronwyn Newport—as they balance their personal and business lives, along with their social circle.

Former cast members featured over the previous seasons are: Jen Shah (1–3), Jennie Nguyen (2) and Monica Garcia (4).

As of November 18, 2026, 123 original episodes of The Real Housewives of Salt Lake City have aired.

== Series overview ==
The Real Housewives of Salt Lake City episodes
Season	Episodes	Originally released		Average Viewers
Season	Episodes	First released	Last released	Average Viewers
1	16	November 11, 2020	February 24, 2021	0.61
2	24	September 12, 2021	March 13, 2022	0.71
3	16	September 28, 2022	February 1, 2023	0.62
4	19	September 5, 2023	January 23, 2024	0.53
5	19	September 18, 2024	February 5, 2025	0.43
6	19	September 16, 2025	January 27, 2026	0.43
7	TBA	September 16, 2026	TBA	TBA

== Episodes ==
=== Season 1 (2020–2021) ===
Lisa Barlow, Mary Cosby, Heather Gay, Meredith Marks, Whitney Rose and Jen Shah are introduced as series regulars.

The Real Housewives of Salt Lake City season 1 episodes
No. overall	No. in season	Title	Original release date	U.S. viewers (millions)
1	1	"Welcome to Salt Lake City!"	November 11, 2020	0.79
2	2	"A Snow Mountain of Trouble"	November 18, 2020	0.66
3	3	"Everybody Needs a Switzerland"	November 25, 2020	0.54
4	4	"Roaring Emotions"	December 2, 2020	0.71
5	5	"Ladies Who Lunch"	December 9, 2020	0.66
6	6	"Sundance City"	December 16, 2020	0.68
7	7	"Fashion Faux Pas"	December 23, 2020	0.56
8	8	"Hot Tub Confessions"	December 30, 2020	0.58
9	9	"Hip Hop and Heartbreak"	January 6, 2021	0.49
10	10	"In Hot Water"	January 13, 2021	0.57
11	11	"All Bets Are Off"	January 20, 2021	0.67
12	12	"Sinners in the City"	January 27, 2021	0.48
13	13	"Chilly Reception"	February 3, 2021	0.52
14	14	"Reunion Part 1"	February 10, 2021	0.54
15	15	"Reunion Part 2"	February 17, 2021	0.78
16	16	"Reunion Part 3"	February 24, 2021	0.59

=== Season 2 (2021–2022) ===
Jennie Nguyen joined the cast.

The Real Housewives of Salt Lake City season 2 episodes
No. overall	No. in season	Title	Original release date	U.S. viewers (millions)
17	1	"Best of Frenemies"	September 12, 2021	0.81
18	2	"Icy Apology"	September 19, 2021	0.75
19	3	"Fishing for the Truth"	September 26, 2021	0.61
20	4	"Friendship Roulette"	October 3, 2021	0.63
21	5	"Gin and Bear It"	October 10, 2021	0.67
22	6	"Sex, Lies and Sister Wives"	October 17, 2021	0.72
23	7	"Slippery Slope"	October 24, 2021	0.71
24	8	"A Wolf Pack of Secrets"	October 31, 2021	0.56
25	9	"I Was Driving Carpool!"	November 7, 2021	0.70
26	10	"Highway to Vail"	November 14, 2021	0.82
27	11	"Old Testaments, New Revelations"	November 21, 2021	0.77
28	12	"A House Divided"	December 5, 2021	0.72
29	13	"Fair Weather Friends"	December 12, 2021	0.70
30	14	"What the Pho?"	December 19, 2021	0.68
31	15	"The Miseducation of Mary Cosby"	January 2, 2022	0.69
32	16	"Holy Mother of Zion"	January 9, 2022	0.78
33	17	"Who's Calling Who A Fraud?"	January 16, 2022	0.84
34	18	"Sorry's and Sleepovers"	January 23, 2022	0.69
35	19	"Cinco De Mayhem"	January 30, 2022	0.72
36	20	"Memorial Meltdown"	February 6, 2022	0.71
37	21	"Why Can't We Be Friends"	February 20, 2022	0.60
38	22	"Reunion Part 1"	February 27, 2022	0.64
39	23	"Reunion Part 2"	March 6, 2022	0.71
40	24	"Reunion Part 3"	March 13, 2022	0.81

=== Season 3 (2022–2023) ===
Mary Cosby and Jennie Nguyen departed as series regulars. Danna Bui-Negrete, Angie Harrington and Angie Katsanevas served in recurring capacities.

The Real Housewives of Salt Lake City season 3 episodes
No. overall	No. in season	Title	Original release date	U.S. viewers (millions)
41	1	"Revenge Marks the Spot"	September 28, 2022	0.69
42	2	"Searching for Sereni-Tea"	October 5, 2022	0.67
43	3	"Courtside Conundrum"	October 12, 2022	0.71
44	4	"Bad Weather Betrayal"	October 19, 2022	0.64
45	5	"On Thin Ice"	October 26, 2022	0.63
46	6	"Finsta Fight"	November 2, 2022	0.56
47	7	"Choir of Chaos"	November 9, 2022	0.43
48	8	"RSVPlease"	November 16, 2022	0.54
49	9	"Not a Yacht of Fun"	November 30, 2022	0.52
50	10	"High Heels in the High Seas"	December 7, 2022	0.56
51	11	"High Stakes and Friendship Breaks"	December 14, 2022	0.61
52	12	"White Lies and Black Eyes"	December 21, 2022	0.67
53	13	"Unfashionable Behavior"	January 4, 2023	0.61
54	14	"Trials and Tribulations"	January 11, 2023	0.69
55	15	"Reunion Part 1"	January 25, 2023	0.70
56	16	"Reunion Part 2"	February 1, 2023	0.66

=== Season 4 (2023–2024) ===
Jen Shah departed as a series regular. Angie Katsanevas and Monica Garcia joined the cast. Mary Cosby served in a recurring capacity.

The Real Housewives of Salt Lake City season 4 episodes
No. overall	No. in season	Title	Original release date	U.S. viewers (millions)
57	1	"Fresh Powder, Fresh Start"	September 5, 2023	0.43
58	2	"Vacation Crashers"	September 12, 2023	0.41
59	3	"All Tricks, No Trust"	September 19, 2023	0.48
60	4	"Don't Be a Drag"	September 26, 2023	0.45
61	5	"The Nastiness and Rumors"	October 3, 2023	0.46
62	6	"Après Rumor"	October 10, 2023	0.41
63	7	"An Olive Branch with Thorns"	October 17, 2023	0.49
64	8	"Moms, Missions, and Matrimony"	October 31, 2023	0.47
65	9	"Don't Come for My Sound Bath"	November 7, 2023	0.45
66	10	"Mormons Get a Bad Rap"	November 14, 2023	0.49
67	11	"If I Could Churn Back Time"	November 21, 2023	0.47
68	12	"Icy Apologies"	November 28, 2023	0.57
69	13	"Bermuda Views and Bathtub Blues"	December 5, 2023	0.51
70	14	"Bermuda Birthday Blues"	December 12, 2023	0.54
71	15	"Swimming with the Fishes"	December 19, 2023	0.59
72	16	"Mysteries, Revealed?"	January 2, 2024	0.62
73	17	"Reunion Part 1"	January 9, 2024	0.81
74	18	"Reunion Part 2"	January 16, 2024	0.76
75	19	"Reunion Part 3"	January 23, 2024	0.74

=== Season 5 (2024–2025) ===
Monica Garcia departed as a series regular. Mary Cosby rejoined the cast as a series regular. Bronwyn Newport joined the cast. Britani Bateman and Meili Workman served in recurring capacities.

The Real Housewives of Salt Lake City season 5 episodes
No. overall	No. in season	Title	Original release date	U.S. viewers (millions)
76	1	"Costume or Couture?"	September 18, 2024	0.38
77	2	"Walking a Tightrope"	September 25, 2024	0.40
78	3	"Basketball, Bobbleheads and the Brow Girl"	October 2, 2024	0.33
79	4	"The Epiphany"	October 9, 2024	0.38
80	5	"Whitney Drew and Her Clues"	October 16, 2024	0.36
81	6	"Mafia Wives and Bad Vibes"	October 23, 2024	0.40
82	7	"The Huzzbands"	October 30, 2024	0.34
83	8	"The Desert and the Deserted"	November 6, 2024	0.35
84	9	"Revenge Is Best Served in Coach"	November 13, 2024	0.38
85	10	"Kiss Kiss, Bangs Bangs"	November 20, 2024	0.44
86	11	"Troop Salt Lake City"	November 27, 2024	0.35
87	12	"Mazel, Meredith"	December 4, 2024	0.48
88	13	"Rooms for Improvement"	December 11, 2024	0.42
89	14	"La VIDA Loca"	December 18, 2024	0.52
90	15	"Smile, You're Being Recorded"	January 8, 2025	0.54
91	16	"When All is Said and Done"	January 15, 2025	0.53
92	17	"Reunion Part 1"	January 22, 2025	0.57
93	18	"Reunion Part 2"	January 29, 2025	0.58
94	19	"Reunion Part 3"	February 5, 2025	0.48

=== Season 6 (2025–2026) ===
Britani Bateman served in a recurring capacity.

The Real Housewives of Salt Lake City season 6 episodes
No. overall	No. in season	Title	Original release date	U.S. viewers (millions)
95	1	"Hot Dogs and Hearsay"	September 16, 2025	0.37
96	2	"Law and Out of Order"	September 23, 2025	0.49
97	3	"Dismissed"	September 30, 2025	0.37
98	4	"Petty Little Liars"	October 7, 2025	0.47
99	5	"The Salt Lake City Soup Man"	October 14, 2025	0.35
100	6	"Out of Gas"	October 21, 2025	0.42
101	7	"Above Deck and Below the Belt"	October 28, 2025	0.43
102	8	"Loose Lips Sink Friend Ships"	November 4, 2025	0.43
103	9	"Unicorn Overboard"	November 11, 2025	0.45
104	10	"The Higher the Hair, the Closer to God"	November 18, 2025	0.40
105	11	"Ladies Who Lunch: The Sequel"	November 25, 2025	0.42
106	12	"First Amendment Rights, and Wrongs"	December 2, 2025	0.43
107	13	"Greek for the Week"	December 9, 2025	0.46
108	14	"My Big Fat Greek Mother's Day"	December 16, 2025	0.43
109	15	"Opas and Outbursts"	December 30, 2025	0.33
110	16	"Sisters of Salt, a Greek Tragedy"	January 6, 2026	0.54
111	17	"Reunion Part 1"	January 13, 2026	0.32
112	18	"Reunion Part 2"	January 20, 2026	0.52
113	19	"Reunion Part 3"	January 27, 2026	0.62

=== Season 7 (2026) ===
Britani Bateman and Ashley Quai served in recurring capacities.

The Real Housewives of Salt Lake City season 7 episodes
No. overall	No. in season	Title	Rating (18–49)	Original release date	U.S. viewers (millions)
114	1	"Chosen Family"	TBA	September 16, 2026	N/A
115	2	"Après-Ski with Lisa B"	TBA	September 23, 2026	N/A
116	3	"Little Green Leprechaun, Big Dirty Secret"	TBA	September 30, 2026	N/A
117	4	"Fortune and Misfortune"	TBA	October 7, 2026	N/A
118	5	"Hypocrisy and Bull..."	TBA	October 14, 2026	N/A
119	6	"Boss Up or Shut Up"	TBA	October 21, 2026	N/A
120	7	"Star Signs and Struggles"	TBA	October 28, 2026	TBD
121	8	"Reiki'd Over the Coals"	TBA	November 4, 2026	TBD
122	9	"Feed Her to the Sharks"	TBA	November 11, 2026	TBD
123	10	"Amends with Friends"	TBA	November 18, 2026	TBD
124	11	"Maui Mystery, Solved"	TBA	November 25, 2026	TBD
125	12	TBA	TBA	December 2, 2026	TBD
126	13	TBA	TBA	December 9, 2026	TBD
