= The Real Housewives of Salt Lake City season 7 =

Season of television series

The Real Housewives of Salt Lake City
- Season 7
- Promotional poster via Peacock
- Starring: Lisa Barlow; Mary Cosby; Heather Gay; Meredith Marks; Whitney Rose; Angie Katsanevas; Bronwyn Newport
- No. of episodes: 10

Release
- Original network: Bravo
- Original release: September 16, 2026 – present

Season chronology
- ← Previous; Season 6

The seventh season of The Real Housewives of Salt Lake City, an American reality television series, is broadcast on Bravo. It premiered on September 16, 2026, and was primarily filmed in Salt Lake City, Utah. Its executive producers are Lisa Shannon, Dan Peirson, Craig Turner, Sunny Franklin, Lucy Bennett, Tamara Blaich and Andy Cohen.

The Real Housewives of Salt Lake City focuses on the lives of Lisa Barlow, Mary Cosby, Heather Gay, Meredith Marks, Whitney Rose, Angie Katsanevas and Bronwyn Newport, with Britani Bateman and Ashley Quai appearing as friends of the housewives.

== Production and crew ==
Lisa Shannon, Dan Peirson, Craig Turner, Sunny Franklin, Lucy Bennett, Tamara Blaich and Andy Cohen are recognized as the series' executive producers; it is produced and distributed by Shed Media.

== Cast and synopsis ==
In February 2026, production on the season was paused following the death of Mary Cosby's son, Robert Jr. Production resumed in March, without Cosby's participation. Bravo offered Cosby to take the year off filming, but she chose to return to the series.

All seven housewives from the previous season were announced to return, alongside "friend of" Britani Bateman with the introduction of new "friend of" Ashley Quai.

== Episodes ==
The Real Housewives of Salt Lake City season 7 episodes
No. overall	No. in season	Title	Rating (18–49)	Original release date	U.S. viewers (millions)
114	1	"Chosen Family"	TBA	September 16, 2026	N/A
115	2	"Après-Ski with Lisa B"	TBA	September 23, 2026	N/A
116	3	"Little Green Leprechaun, Big Dirty Secret"	TBA	September 30, 2026	N/A
117	4	"Fortune and Misfortune"	TBA	October 7, 2026	N/A
118	5	"Hypocrisy and Bull..."	TBA	October 14, 2026	N/A
119	6	"Boss Up or Shut Up"	TBA	October 21, 2026	N/A
120	7	"Star Signs and Struggles"	TBA	October 28, 2026	TBD
121	8	"Reiki'd Over the Coals"	TBA	November 4, 2026	TBD
122	9	"Feed Her to the Sharks"	TBA	November 11, 2026	TBD
123	10	"Amends with Friends"	TBA	November 18, 2026	TBD
124	11	"Maui Mystery, Solved"	TBA	November 25, 2026	TBD
125	12	TBA	TBA	December 2, 2026	TBD
126	13	TBA	TBA	December 9, 2026	TBD
127	14	TBA	TBA	December 16, 2026	TBD
