= The Real Housewives of Salt Lake City season 6 =

Season of television series

The Real Housewives of Salt Lake City
- Season 6
- Promotional poster via Peacock
- Starring: Lisa Barlow; Mary Cosby; Heather Gay; Meredith Marks; Whitney Rose; Angie Katsanevas; Bronwyn Newport
- No. of episodes: 19

Release
- Original network: Bravo
- Original release: September 16, 2025 – January 27, 2026

Season chronology
- ← Previous; Season 5

The sixth season of The Real Housewives of Salt Lake City, an American reality television series, is broadcast on Bravo. It premiered on September 16, 2025, and was primarily filmed in Salt Lake City, Utah. Its executive producers are Lisa Shannon, Dan Peirson, Lori Gordon, Tamara Blaich and Andy Cohen.

The Real Housewives of Salt Lake City focuses on the lives of Lisa Barlow, Mary Cosby, Heather Gay, Meredith Marks, Whitney Rose, Angie Katsanevas and Bronwyn Newport, with Britani Bateman appearing as a friend of the housewives.

== Production and crew ==
Production for the season began in February and concluded in June. In April 2025, Bravo confirmed The Real Housewives of Salt Lake City would be having a crossover with Below Deck Down Under. The Real Housewives of Salt Lake City was renewed for a sixth season in May 2025. On August 14, 2025, the official trailer and cast were revealed, as well as a premiere date.

The season premiere, "Hot Dogs and Hearsay" aired on September 16, 2025, while the finale "Sisters of Salt, a Greek Tragedy" aired on January 6, 2026. It was followed by a three part reunion which aired between January 13, January 20, and January 27. Lisa Shannon, Dan Peirson, Lori Gordon, Tamara Blaich and Andy Cohen are recognized as the series' executive producers; it is produced and distributed by Shed Media.

== Cast and synopsis ==
In June 2025, Meili Workman, who served in a recurring 'friend of' capacity the season prior, confirmed she would not be returning to the series, despite her claim of being offered a contract by producers. Along with the season's announcement, all seven housewives, including 'friend of' Britani Bateman, were confirmed to be returning.

=== Synopsis ===
After not attending the first cast trip organized by Angie and Mary, Lisa becomes the topic of conversation when the girls begin to question her absence. While Lisa previously told Angie she wouldn't be able to make the trip because she would be "with Ben and Blake" on a work trip, the women speculate that she doesn't want to answer their questions about her personal life. At the camp site, Britani announces she and Jared got engaged, but are no longer; Bronwyn discusses the contents of the lawsuits filed against Lisa, with Angie comparing the accusations to the crimes of Jen Shah.

Robert Jr., still struggling with sobriety, talks to Mary about his struggles as she tries to support and guide him. Bronwyn and Heather sit down in an attempt to put their contentious past behind them. At a party hosted by Utah socialite Amy Steele, Britani tells Lisa about Bronwyn's gossip and Angie's comparison of Lisa to Jen Shah. Lisa confronts Angie when Bronwyn inserts herself, to which Lisa acclaims "You're dismissed," leading to a heated verbal spectacle.

Bronwyn goes through a transitional time as her mother has moved in with her and Todd after undergoing brain surgery for a tumor and since Bronwyn's father was moved into a memory-care facility due to medical decline. As Bronwyn and her mother, Muzzy, prepare to sell her childhood home, Bronwyn discusses the degeneration of her and Muzzy's relationship dating back to when Bronwyn got pregnant in college. Lisa hosts a group lunch in an attempt to settle all questions and rumors regarding her legal cases. Whitney accuses Lisa of lying and 'digging up dirt' on other people in order to deflect from her own problems, to which Lisa brings up Whitney's failed business, and questions why she out of everyone would judge anyone else's finances. Lisa calls Whitney a 'redhead' before Whitney throws her napkin at Lisa, leaving flustered. Lisa and Angie begin to argue, discrediting one another's business ventures when Lisa claims Angie doesn't own the entire Lunatic Fringe franchise.

Bronwyn meets with Lisa at her lounge to come to a common ground. Both women apologize to the other for gossiping and going low with insults. Mary prepares to reopen her church, which is undergoing renovations, and reflects on the recent death of her mother. Bronwyn and Muzzy's relationship continues to strain after the two argue over how Bronwyn raises her daughter, Gwen, believing it's better to have an open and transparent relationship, while Muzzy expresses her belief in discipline, and criticizes Bronwyn for getting pregnant young. Britani meets with Whitney to talk about the effects that her relationship with Jared has had on her relationship with her estranged daughter. Whitney tells Britani to prioritize her relationship with her daughter, as it will be more meaningful in the future. Angie meets with Meredith to tell her that Lisa encouraged her to look up information about Meredith's family when the two were feuding; however, Meredith finds it hard to believe.

At Whitney's telepathic wine tasting, Meredith questions Lisa about Angie's previous claims, which she denies, calling Angie a liar. During a back-and-forth about money, Angie claims Lisa's boyfriend shops at Nordstrom's for her, Lisa rebuts by insinuating that Angie had an affair with a "Soup Man" (later clarified to be "Suit Man"). While Mary comforts Angie, Angie says that everyone has 'gone back' to Lisa, insulting Mary, and prompting her to tell Angie she's "done with her."

Angie invites Mary over to her house to apologize for the comment; making up by the end of Mary's visit. In meeting with Heather, Lisa clarifies that although she meant 'Suit Man', she only made the accusation as a rebuttal, which Heather doesn't agree with.

The girls embark on their cast trip, served by the cast of Below Deck Down Under. Upon her arrival, Bronwyn addresses her previous legal cases that have recently surfaced, asserting that her only legal cases included an eviction 20 years prior, and a work-related incident which has since been dismissed and sealed. Later, Whitney and Heather point out how negative information conveniently surfaces about people who are at odds with Lisa. At dinner, Bronwyn instigates an argument between Britani and Meredith after claiming Britani said Meredith "pretends to have seizures." Meredith angrily asserts both she and her son, Brooks, both have seizures before throwing her drink at Britani. Heather then brings up her conversation with Whitney about Lisa, implying Lisa's involvement in the leaks. Lisa defensively denies the accusation, arguing that people gossip about her all the time, but that doesn't mean she's the one spreading it. Lisa becomes emotional as she feels everyone is ganging up on her, and tearfully leaves the dinner to call her husband.

Britani and Bronwyn's already-strained relationship continues to deteriorate after Bronwyn overhears Lisa and Britani talking about her on the balcony, which she later brings up, accusing Britani of bringing a crew member into their room. Angie brings up a rumor that Lisa told her about one of Lisa's friends making out with Bronwyn's husband, Todd. Lisa doesn't deny that she said the rumor but admits she shouldn't have said it. That night at dinner, Britani brings up a TikTok she saw regarding Meredith's husband, Seth, having a mistress. Meredith aggressively denies the rumor, accusing Britani of starting drama because she's insecure with her relationship with Jared. In an act of revenge, Bronwyn and Meredith throw Britani's stuffed unicorn overboard.

== Episodes ==
The Real Housewives of Salt Lake City season 6 episodes
No. overall	No. in season	Title	Original release date	U.S. viewers (millions)
95	1	"Hot Dogs and Hearsay"	September 16, 2025	0.37
Angie and Mary plans a surprise the ladies with a "Class A" RV getaway, but with Lisa away on business, Bronwyn raises rumors she’s heard about Lisa’s company. Tensions build when Britani confronts Whitney, and Heather clashes with Bronwyn. Angie drops a provocative claim about one of the women, and an unexpected blast from Salt Lake City’s past turns the night into an unsettling one for the group.
96	2	"Law and Out of Order"	September 23, 2025	0.49
At a party, Lisa challenges Bronwyn and Angie about rumors circulating regarding her past legal troubles. Mary stands by Robert Jr. as he continues his sobriety journey, while Heather hesitantly agrees to give Bronwyn another shot at rebuilding their friendship.
97	3	"Dismissed"	September 30, 2025	0.37
Lisa throws a luncheon in hopes of clearing up the gossip spread about her past lawsuits, but the event quickly unravels as she fires off insults at nearly everyone. Bronwyn navigates new family dynamics at home. Angie begins to pursue her Greek citizenship. Heather leans into her upcoming empty-nester chapter by planning a playful “love den.”
98	4	"Petty Little Liars"	October 7, 2025	0.47
Lisa’s fiery clarity luncheon wraps up in an unexpected way, opening the door to a possible step forward between her and Bronwyn. Whitney urges Britani to pause her relationship with Jared and prioritize her daughter. Mary stops by to see the progress on her church renovations. Lisa and Angie continue to grow further apart.
99	5	"The Salt Lake City Soup Man"	October 14, 2025	0.35
Whitney hosts the ladies for a wine tasting paired with psychic readings. Bronwyn gains perspective on her relationship with her mother, Lisa is pushed to confront difficult realities about her marriage. Whitney begins to doubt whether Britani has been fully honest with the women about Jared. Meredith calls out Lisa for past rumor-spreading, reigniting Lisa’s conflict with Angie and creating tension between Angie and Mary.
100	6	"Out of Gas"	October 21, 2025	0.42
Relationships are put to the test when Heather directly confronts Lisa. Angie and Mary sit down for a candid heart-to-heart. Britani attempts to rebuild her bond with her daughter. Lisa and John’s communication breakdown reaches a tipping point, and serious accusations place added strain on Bronwyn’s marriage.
101	7	"Above Deck and Below the Belt"	October 28, 2025	0.43
In a crossover episode with Below Deck Down Under, the women jet off for Heather’s Caribbean yacht getaway—though one Housewife is absent. Once aboard, Britani flirts with Captain Jason and members of the deck crew, while Angie struggles to find her sea legs. Bronwyn and Whitney begin to suspect that someone in the group may be feeding stories to the press.
102	8	"Loose Lips Sink Friend Ships"	November 4, 2025	0.43
Heather’s yacht getaway takes a dramatic turn when Bronwyn discovers that Lisa has been circulating rumors. Meredith becomes more uncomfortable with Britani’s actions as tensions rise. Lisa later vents her frustrations about Meredith to Mary, which ultimately ignites a heated confrontation at the Real Zombies of the Yacht-Pocalypse dinner.
103	9	"Unicorn Overboard"	November 11, 2025	0.45
On the final day at sea, tensions erupt as Meredith and Britani’s feud intensifies, with Meredith also taking issue with Whitney. Bronwyn suggests a sacrificial offering to Meredith. An alleged incident divides the group and forces everyone to choose sides. Meanwhile, back home, Angie receives upsetting news from Elektra. Bronwyn confronts a personal scandal.
104	10	"The Higher the Hair, the Closer to God"	November 18, 2025	0.40
Whitney hosts a surprise “High Body Count” party for Britani, who feels moved by her friends’ support until Jared delivers a harsh reality check. Bronwyn and Lisa each sit down for difficult conversations with their husbands. Mary works to reopen her church and focuses on being a steady source of support for Robert Jr. The group comes together again for the first time since returning from Canouan.
105	11	"Ladies Who Lunch: The Sequel"	November 25, 2025	0.42
Mary hosts a luncheon following her church service, but tensions deepen as Lisa and Meredith stand firm in their version of events. Bronwyn receives life-changing news. Britani and her daughter Olivia begin working toward repairing their relationship, and Meredith eventually comes face to face with Britani to address their conflict.
106	12	"First Amendment Rights, and Wrongs"	December 2, 2025	0.43
Hoping to repair fractured relationships, Bronwyn celebrates her new U.S. citizenship by hosting a “Spill the Tea” party, but the gathering quickly descends into chaos. Meredith is put on the spot as new accusations surface from the ladies. Once the drama settles, Angie throws in an unexpected twist with a surprise for the women.
107	13	"Greek for the Week"	December 9, 2025	0.46
The women begin their Greek vacation in Santorini, but the tranquil setting doesn’t last long. What starts as a day of beaches and shopping turns tense when Meredith and Heather’s conflict resurfaces. Bronwyn pulls back on opening up about her marriage, while Angie feels slighted after Lisa chooses glam over joining the group for a sunset experience.
108	14	"My Big Fat Greek Mother's Day"	December 16, 2025	0.43
It’s Mother’s Day in Santorini, and Meredith feels emotional after missing an opportunity to connect with her son. Tensions from the previous night linger, prompting the women to divide into smaller groups for activities like donkey rides and a cooking class. The group later enjoys time by the pool, but drama resurfaces at night when Britani announces she’s secured a trademark without telling the others.
109	15	"Opas and Outbursts"	December 30, 2025	0.33
The Santorini getaway continues as Angie surprises the group with a once-in-a-lifetime photoshoot. What begins as a relaxing spa day quickly turns chaotic when Britani clashes with several of the women. Mary, Bronwyn, and Whitney come together to share their concerns about a friend and bond over their shared perspective. Lisa talks about her love of trees.
110	16	"Sisters of Salt, a Greek Tragedy"	January 6, 2026	0.54
On their final day in Santorini, the women visit Angie’s cousin at a winery to learn more about her family history and cultural roots. After meeting with a local playwright, they attend a special traditional Greek theater performance inspired by their group. The production receives mixed reactions, sparking fresh disagreements and leading the ladies to confront one another.
111	17	"Reunion Part 1"	January 13, 2026	0.32
112	18	"Reunion Part 2"	January 20, 2026	0.52
113	19	"Reunion Part 3"	January 27, 2026	0.62
