= The Real Housewives Ultimate Girls Trip season 5 =

Season of American reality television series

The Real Housewives Ultimate Girls Trip
- Season 5
- Promotional poster
- Starring: Lisa Barlow; Gizelle Bryant; Teresa Giudice; Vicki Gunvalson; Luann de Lesseps; Kyle Richards; Porsha Williams
- No. of episodes: 9

Release
- Original network: Bravo
- Original release: August 9 – October 4, 2026

Season chronology
- ← Previous; Season 4

The fifth season of the American reality television series The Real Housewives Ultimate Girls Trip premiered on Bravo on August 9, 2026. The season, subtitled Roaring 20th, featured nine episodes and is produced by Shed Media. Unlike previous seasons, filming took place in multiple locations, including: Orange County, Los Angeles, Atlanta, Miami, New York City, and the Berkshires.

Lisa Barlow, Gizelle Bryant, Teresa Giudice, Vicki Gunvalson, Luann de Lesseps, Kyle Richards, and Porsha Williams appeared as main cast members. Throughout the season, various Housewives alumni appeared, celebrating the twentieth anniversary of The Real Housewives franchise.

== Cast ==
In January 2026, the cast for the fifth season of The Real Housewives Ultimate Girls Trip was announced on Watch What Happens Live by Andy Cohen. The seven main housewives featured in the season include Lisa Barlow, Gizelle Bryant, Teresa Giudice, Vicki Gunvalson, Luann de Lesseps, Kyle Richards, and Porsha Williams, representing The Real Housewives of Salt Lake City, Potomac, New Jersey, Orange County, New York City, Beverly Hills, and Atlanta, respectively. That same month, it was announced that Nene Leakes would make a guest appearance during the season. This marks her first appearance on a Housewives franchise since the twelfth season of Atlanta.

In addition to the seven main cast members, Bravo revealed various Housewives alumni would make guest appearances during the season. These housewives include:

- Chanel Ayan
- Cynthia Bailey
- Kiki Barth
- Candiace Dillard Bassett
- Shannon Storms Beador
- Kelly Bensimon
- Alicia Carmody
- Dolores Catania
- Mary Cosby
- Ashley Darby
- Eileen Davidson
- Jo De La Rosa
- Sai De Silva
- Rosie DiMare
- Robyn Dixon
- Heather Dubrow
- Heather Gay
- Melissa Gorga
- Camille Grammer
- Marlo Hampton
- Lisa Hochstein
- Ashley Iaconetti
- Erika Jayne
- Tamra Judge
- Angie Katsanevas
- Jeana Keough
- Jacqueline Laurita
- NeNe Leakes
- Erin Lichy
- Adrienne Maloof
- Meredith Marks
- Alex McCord
- Dorinda Medley
- Teddi Mellencamp
- Crystal Kung Minkoff
- Adriana de Moura
- Alexia Nepola
- Bronwyn Newport
- Phaedra Parks
- Marysol Patton
- Larsa Pippen
- Rulla Nehme Pontarelli
- Carole Radziwill
- Faye Resnick
- Denise Richards
- Whitney Rose
- Stacey Rusch
- Bozoma Saint John
- Drew Sidora
- Sutton Stracke
- Kelsey Swanson
- Jessel Taank
- Peggy Tanous
- Jo-Ellen Tiberi
- Shereé Whitfield
- Lisa Wu
- Jill Zarin
- Kim Zolciak

== Production ==
In November 2025, Cohen announced that a successor series to The Real Housewives Ultimate Girls Trip, under the working title The Real Housewives: Ultimate Road Trip would premiere on Bravo in the following year. In a statement, Bravo revealed the planned Ultimate Road Trip would celebrate "unforgettable moments, connection, and legacy" as part of beginning a new chapter in The Real Housewives franchise. In January 2026, it was announced the planned successor series would relaunch the Ultimate Girls Trip franchise, under the subtitle Roaring 20th. Production commenced on the West Coast in Orange County, California, and concluded on the East Coast.

== Episodes ==
The Real Housewives Ultimate Girls Trip season 5 episodes
No. overall	No. in season	Title	Rating (18–49)	Original release date	U.S. viewers (millions)
28	1	"Back Where It All Began"	TBA	August 9, 2026	N/A
29	2	"Leather You Like It or Not"	TBA	August 16, 2026	N/A
30	3	"White Lies"	TBA	August 23, 2026	N/A
31	4	"Meet Me at the Altar... Ego Party"	TBA	August 30, 2026	N/A
32	5	"To Peach Her Own"	TBA	September 6, 2026	N/A
33	6	"Cockies and Conversation"	TBA	September 13, 2026	N/A
34	7	"Sisterhood of the Traveling Housewives"	TBA	September 20, 2026	N/A
35	8	"Mic Drop, Please"	TBA	September 27, 2026	N/A
36	9	"Bluestone Manners"	TBA	October 4, 2026	N/A

== Reception ==
The season's premiere episode, "Back Where It All Began", drew positive response from initial reviews. Vulture's Brian Moylan compared the episode to that of "riding in a malfunctioning time machine". He further named Leakes' guest appearance as a highlight for the episode., adding that she was "back where she belongs". Similarly, in a post on his Substack "Obsessed", The Daily Beast editor Kevin Fallon echoed Moylan's sentiments about Leakes' appearance, describing it as a "monumental" moment. Fallon further described Roaring 20th as what he hoped for, and that the opening moments of the premiere episode was a "delirious trip down memory lane".
