= The Real Housewives of Salt Lake City season 5 =

Season of television series

The Real Housewives of Salt Lake City
- Season 5
- Promotional poster via Peacock
- Starring: Lisa Barlow; Mary Cosby; Heather Gay; Meredith Marks; Whitney Rose; Angie Katsanevas; Bronwyn Newport
- No. of episodes: 19

Release
- Original network: Bravo
- Original release: September 18, 2024 – February 5, 2025

Season chronology
- ← Previous; Season 4 Next → Season 6

The fifth season of The Real Housewives of Salt Lake City, an American reality television series, is broadcast on Bravo. It premiered on September 18, 2024, and was primarily filmed in Salt Lake City, Utah. Its executive producers are Lisa Shannon, Dan Peirson, Lori Gordon, Luke Neslage and Andy Cohen.

The Real Housewives of Salt Lake City focuses on the lives of Lisa Barlow, Mary Cosby, Heather Gay, Meredith Marks, Whitney Rose, Angie Katsanevas and Bronwyn Newport, with Britani Bateman and Meili Workman appearing as friends of the housewives.

== Cast ==
Following the conclusion of the show's fourth season reunion, it was announced that Monica Garcia would not be returning to the series for its fifth season. Lisa Barlow, Heather Gay, Meredith Marks, Whitney Rose, and Angie Katsanevas all returned for the fifth season as housewives. Mary Cosby was again promoted to full-time housewife after serving as a friend the previous season. Alongside the veterans, it was revealed that Bronwyn Newport had joined the series as a housewife. Newcomers Britani Bateman and Meili Workman also appeared as "friends of the housewives."

== Production and crew ==
Filming for the fifth season began in February 2024 and concluded in May 2024. The reunion was filmed in New York City on December 5, 2024. Lisa Shannon, Dan Peirson, Lori Gordon, Luke Neslage, Tamara Blaich and Andy Cohen are recognized as the series' executive producers; it is produced and distributed by Shed Media.

== Episodes ==
The Real Housewives of Salt Lake City season 5 episodes
No. overall	No. in season	Title	Original release date	U.S. viewers (millions)
76	1	"Costume or Couture?"	September 18, 2024	0.38
After a tumultuous previous year, Lisa celebrates Valentine’s Day by throwing a Besos party for her friends, but shows no love for Whitney. Meredith confronts Whitney for starting a bath bomb line. Both Angie and Meredith seek apologies for events that transpired last year. Lisa’s friend Bronwyn brings a new level of sophistication, fashion and a critical eye to the group. Heather’s friend Britani makes a less than favorable impression on Mary.
77	2	"Walking a Tightrope"	September 25, 2024	0.40
After the chaos at Lisa’s Besos party, Lisa and Angie struggle to find a way forward in their friendship. Heather hosts a ropes course to bring the group together and resolve past issues. Bronwyn lands in the hot seat when Heather accuses her of being two-faced. Meredith recommits to Judaism and decides to become a bat mitzvah. Britani’s on-again, off-again relationship irks Mary.
78	3	"Basketball, Bobbleheads and the Brow Girl"	October 2, 2024	0.33
Whitney takes the women on a girl’s trip to Milwaukee, but things heat up when Bronwyn confronts Lisa for not defending her at the ropes course. Meredith reveals an unsavory rumor about Whitney’s jewelry line to Heather. Angie discovers something shocking about Britani’s on-again boyfriend, leaving her to break the news to Britani. The women enjoy a VIP experience at a basketball game where Meili confronts Lisa.
79	4	"The Epiphany"	October 9, 2024	0.38
On day two of the Milwaukee girl’s trip, the women rally around Britani. Lisa makes her own plans for the day. Heather tells Whitney about the Prism rumors, causing her to clash with Meredith. Relationships are tested at a motorcycle-themed dinner where Lisa and Angie attempt to hash out their issues until Lisa crosses the line. Britani makes an announcement about her relationship and questions Bronwyn’s true motives behind marrying an older man.
80	5	"Whitney Drew and Her Clues"	October 16, 2024	0.36
As the women settle back into life in Salt Lake City after their whirlwind trip to Milwaukee, group dynamics are anything but calm. Whitney is on the hunt to find out who planted the rumors about her business. Lisa and Bronwyn make a surprising and life-altering connection. Mary is fed up with Heather and her slippery relationship with the truth. Britani’s relationship continues to cause friction within the group.
81	6	"Mafia Wives and Bad Vibes"	October 23, 2024	0.40
Angie celebrates her 25th wedding anniversary with a mafia-themed party and extends a surprising olive branch. Whitney accuses Lisa of leaking the rumor about her jewelry company, leading to a fight that goes beyond the women to include their husbands. Mary and Angie accuse Heather of being two faced, but Heather thinks Bronwyn may be to blame. Britani is caught in a love triangle that leaves her in tears.
82	7	"The Huzzbands"	October 30, 2024	0.34
Angie’s anniversary party leaves the group at odds, causing Bronwyn to question who she should invite to Palm Springs. Justin and John work to resolve their issues. Angie takes Heather to task for misrepresenting her comments about Lisa and betraying her trust. Meredith finds herself in conflict with Angie’s husband, Shawn, over a podcast and reveals she’s facing challenges in her marriage with Seth. Bronwyn invites Heather over to make amends, but things quickly go awry.
83	8	"The Desert and the Deserted"	November 6, 2024	0.35
Bronwyn and Todd take the couples to Palm Springs to celebrate their 10th anniversary, but once in the desert, the divisions in the group become clear. Even after being uninvited on the trip, Heather makes her presence known in Palm Springs. Tensions between Lisa and Bronwyn boil over in the hot tub, resulting in Todd asking Lisa and John to leave early. Meredith gets upset when Seth prioritizes work over their marriage, suggesting trouble in paradise.
84	9	"Revenge Is Best Served in Coach"	November 13, 2024	0.38
As the couple’s trip to Palm Springs continues, tensions mount between Bronwyn and Lisa. Todd’s frustration with the group’s fighting grows. At dinner, Meredith questions Shawn’s comments about her family while Whitney and Lisa finally find some common ground. The group enjoys a fun day at the racetrack, but things quickly go south when Lisa learns their mode of travel back home is less than luxurious.
85	10	"Kiss Kiss, Bangs Bangs"	November 20, 2024	0.44
An Audrey Hepburn-inspired brunch leaves most of the women at odds. Mary and Meredith’s friendship lands in a rocky place after a surprising conflict. Heather has lingering resentment over Palm Springs. Todd is disappointed in Bronwyn’s behavior. Angie makes an emotional confession to her dad. Mary’s concern for Robert Jr. grows.
86	11	"Troop Salt Lake City"	November 27, 2024	0.35
Heather and Whitney host a girl’s camp to reunite the women, but fractures in the friend group only become more evident. Meredith invites Mary to a gallery to work through their issues, but things quickly go awry. Lisa and Angie meet up to attempt to make amends, but Bronwyn threatens their reconciliation when she reveals what Angie and Whitney have been talking about behind everyone’s back. As her bat mitzvah approaches, Meredith hosts a Shabbat dinner. Mary has a heart-to-heart with Robert Jr. and learns a dark truth.
87	12	"Mazel, Meredith"	December 4, 2024	0.48
Meredith becomes a bat mitzvah. After breaking Whitney and Angie’s trust, Bronwyn is confronted for spilling their secrets. Mary tries to work through her issues with Meredith while grappling with personal issues at home. The party takes a surprising turn when hair argument arises.
88	13	"Rooms for Improvement"	December 11, 2024	0.42
There is trouble in paradise as the ladies embark on their trip to Puerto Vallarta. Angie feels slighted after Meredith’s bat mitzvah. Bronwyn and Lisa have a falling out over room assignments. Mary chooses to stay in Salt Lake City as issues with Robert Jr. come to a head. Britani makes a new announcement. Bronwyn comes to terms with Gwen’s decision about her grandparents.
89	14	"La VIDA Loca"	December 18, 2024	0.52
The Mexico trip continues as the ladies set sail on a yacht excursion. Lisa updates the group on life with John and Henry.Britani takes offense at the lack of enthusiasm over her latest announcement. Bronwyn reveals some dark truths about her marriage and is surprised by Heather’s grace and Lisa’s lack of support. Mary arrives and the ladies come together for a beautiful VIDA dinner where Meredith learns her late-night antics have fueled Britani with fresh gossip. Angie and Bronwyn confront Lisa at dinner, causing a dramatic conclusion to the evening.
90	15	"Smile, You're Being Recorded"	January 8, 2025	0.54
The girls' trip to Puerto Vallarta goes from bad to worse when someone is caught red-handed recording the women, causing everyone to turn on her.
91	16	"When All is Said and Done"	January 15, 2025	0.53
On their final day in Mexico, the ladies surprise Lisa with a Lisa-themed lunch, but things take a turn when Whitney finally pushes Lisa to her limit. An uncensored and extended version of this episode aired on Peacock on January 16th.
92	17	"Reunion Part 1"	January 22, 2025	0.57
93	18	"Reunion Part 2"	January 29, 2025	0.58
94	19	"Reunion Part 3"	February 5, 2025	0.48
