= The Real Housewives of Salt Lake City season 2 =

The Real Housewives of Salt Lake City
- Season 2
- Cover used by the iTunes Store
- Starring: Lisa Barlow; Mary Cosby; Heather Gay; Meredith Marks; Whitney Rose; Jen Shah; Jennie Nguyen
- No. of episodes: 24

Release
- Original network: Bravo
- Original release: September 12, 2021 – March 13, 2022

Season chronology
- ← Previous; Season 1 Next → Season 3

The second season of The Real Housewives of Salt Lake City, an American reality television series, was broadcast on Bravo. It premiered on September 12, 2021, and was primarily filmed in Salt Lake City, Utah. Its executive producers are Lisa Shannon, Dan Peirson, Lori Gordon, Chaz Morgan and Andy Cohen.

Season 2 of The Real Housewives of Salt Lake City focuses on the lives of Lisa Barlow, Mary Cosby, Heather Gay, Meredith Marks, Whitney Rose, Jen Shah and Jennie Nguyen. It premiered on September 12, 2021.

This season marked the first departure of Mary Cosby, who returned as a friend of the show in season 4 and was promoted back to a full time housewife in season 5, as well as the only appearance of Jennie Nguyen.

== Production and crew ==
In February 2021, the show was renewed for a second season by Bravo. Lisa Shannon, Dan Peirson, Lori Gordon, Chaz Morgan and Andy Cohen are recognized as the season's executive producers; it is produced and distributed by Shed Media.

== Cast ==
Lisa Barlow, Mary Cosby, Heather Gay, Meredith Marks, Whitney Rose and Jen Shah all returned for the second season, joined by new housewife Jennie Nguyen. Angie Harrington made multiple guest appearances.

Notably, this season marks the first appearance of Angie Katsanevas (in a guest appearance). She would later appear as a recurring friend of the housewives in season 3, and was promoted a full-time housewife in season 4.

== Episodes ==
The Real Housewives of Salt Lake City season 2 episodes
No. overall	No. in season	Title	Original release date	U.S. viewers (millions)
17	1	"Best of Frenemies"	September 12, 2021	0.81
18	2	"Icy Apology"	September 19, 2021	0.75
19	3	"Fishing for the Truth"	September 26, 2021	0.61
20	4	"Friendship Roulette"	October 3, 2021	0.63
21	5	"Gin and Bear It"	October 10, 2021	0.67
22	6	"Sex, Lies and Sister Wives"	October 17, 2021	0.72
23	7	"Slippery Slope"	October 24, 2021	0.71
24	8	"A Wolf Pack of Secrets"	October 31, 2021	0.56
25	9	"I Was Driving Carpool!"	November 7, 2021	0.70
26	10	"Highway to Vail"	November 14, 2021	0.82
27	11	"Old Testaments, New Revelations"	November 21, 2021	0.77
28	12	"A House Divided"	December 5, 2021	0.72
29	13	"Fair Weather Friends"	December 12, 2021	0.70
30	14	"What the Pho?"	December 19, 2021	0.68
31	15	"The Miseducation of Mary Cosby"	January 2, 2022	0.69
32	16	"Holy Mother of Zion"	January 9, 2022	0.78
33	17	"Who's Calling Who A Fraud?"	January 16, 2022	0.84
34	18	"Sorry's and Sleepovers"	January 23, 2022	0.69
35	19	"Cinco De Mayhem"	January 30, 2022	0.72
36	20	"Memorial Meltdown"	February 6, 2022	0.71
37	21	"Why Can't We Be Friends"	February 20, 2022	0.60
38	22	"Reunion Part 1"	February 27, 2022	0.64
39	23	"Reunion Part 2"	March 6, 2022	0.71
40	24	"Reunion Part 3"	March 13, 2022	0.81
