= The Real Housewives of Salt Lake City season 1 =

The Real Housewives of Salt Lake City
- Season 1
- Cover used by the iTunes Store
- Starring: Lisa Barlow; Mary Cosby; Heather Gay; Meredith Marks; Whitney Rose; Jen Shah
- No. of episodes: 16

Release
- Original network: Bravo
- Original release: November 11, 2020 – February 24, 2021

Season chronology
- Next → Season 2

The first season of The Real Housewives of Salt Lake City, an American reality television series, was broadcast on Bravo. It premiered on November 11, 2020 and was primarily filmed in Salt Lake City, Utah. Producers of the first season include Lisa Shannon, Dan Peirson, Sergio Alfaro, Michaline Babich, Luke Neslage, Lori Gordon, Adam Karpe and Andy Cohen.

Season 1 of The Real Housewives of Salt Lake City focuses on the lives of Lisa Barlow, Mary Cosby, Heather Gay, Meredith Marks, Whitney Rose and Jen Shah. It premiered on November 11, 2020.

== Production and crew ==
Lisa Shannon, Dan Peirson, Sergio Alfaro, Luke Neslage, Lori Gordon, Adam Karpe and Andy Cohen are recognized as the season's executive producers; it is produced and distributed by InventTV. The series was announced at the BravoCon fan convention in New York City on November 16, 2019.

== Cast ==
The cast members consisting of Lisa Barlow, Mary Cosby, Heather Gay, Meredith Marks, Whitney Rose and Jen Shah were announced on September 9, 2020.

== Episodes ==
The Real Housewives of Salt Lake City season 1 episodes
No. overall	No. in season	Title	Original release date	U.S. viewers (millions)
1	1	"Welcome to Salt Lake City!"	November 11, 2020	0.79
2	2	"A Snow Mountain of Trouble"	November 18, 2020	0.66
3	3	"Everybody Needs a Switzerland"	November 25, 2020	0.54
4	4	"Roaring Emotions"	December 2, 2020	0.71
5	5	"Ladies Who Lunch"	December 9, 2020	0.66
6	6	"Sundance City"	December 16, 2020	0.68
7	7	"Fashion Faux Pas"	December 23, 2020	0.56
8	8	"Hot Tub Confessions"	December 30, 2020	0.58
9	9	"Hip Hop and Heartbreak"	January 6, 2021	0.49
10	10	"In Hot Water"	January 13, 2021	0.57
11	11	"All Bets Are Off"	January 20, 2021	0.67
12	12	"Sinners in the City"	January 27, 2021	0.48
13	13	"Chilly Reception"	February 3, 2021	0.52
14	14	"Reunion Part 1"	February 10, 2021	0.54
15	15	"Reunion Part 2"	February 17, 2021	0.78
16	16	"Reunion Part 3"	February 24, 2021	0.59
