= The Real Housewives of Salt Lake City season 3 =

Season of television series

The Real Housewives of Salt Lake City
- Season 3
- Cover used by the iTunes Store
- Starring: Lisa Barlow; Heather Gay; Meredith Marks; Whitney Rose; Jen Shah
- No. of episodes: 16

Release
- Original network: Bravo
- Original release: September 28, 2022 – February 1, 2023

Season chronology
- ← Previous; Season 2 Next → Season 4

The third season of The Real Housewives of Salt Lake City, an American reality television series, was broadcast on Bravo. It premiered on September 28, 2022, and was primarily filmed in Salt Lake City, Utah. Its executive producers are Lisa Shannon, Dan Peirson, Lori Gordon, Luke Neslage and Andy Cohen.

The Real Housewives of Salt Lake City focuses on the lives of returning cast members Lisa Barlow, Heather Gay, Meredith Marks, Whitney Rose and Jen Shah.

This season marked the final appearance of Jen Shah.

== Production and crew ==
Lisa Shannon, Dan Peirson, Lori Gordon, Luke Neslage and Andy Cohen are recognized as the series' executive producers; it is produced and distributed by Shed Media.

== Cast and synopsis ==
In January 2022, Bravo announced they had fired Jennie Nguyen and ceased filming with her due to Facebook posts criticizing the Black Lives Matter movement. In February 2022, it was announced Mary Cosby had departed the series.

Barlow, Gay, Marks, Rose, and Shah returned, with new friends-of the housewives Angie Harrington, Angie Katsanevas and Danna Bui-Negrete.

This season marks the final appearance of Jen Shah, after she was sentenced to 6.5 years in prison.

== Episodes ==
The Real Housewives of Salt Lake City season 3 episodes
No. overall	No. in season	Title	Original release date	U.S. viewers (millions)
41	1	"Revenge Marks the Spot"	September 28, 2022	0.69
42	2	"Searching for Sereni-Tea"	October 5, 2022	0.67
43	3	"Courtside Conundrum"	October 12, 2022	0.71
44	4	"Bad Weather Betrayal"	October 19, 2022	0.64
45	5	"On Thin Ice"	October 26, 2022	0.63
46	6	"Finsta Fight"	November 2, 2022	0.56
47	7	"Choir of Chaos"	November 9, 2022	0.43
48	8	"RSVPlease"	November 16, 2022	0.54
49	9	"Not a Yacht of Fun"	November 30, 2022	0.52
50	10	"High Heels in the High Seas"	December 7, 2022	0.56
51	11	"High Stakes and Friendship Breaks"	December 14, 2022	0.61
52	12	"White Lies and Black Eyes"	December 21, 2022	0.67
53	13	"Unfashionable Behavior"	January 4, 2023	0.61
54	14	"Trials and Tribulations"	January 11, 2023	0.69
55	15	"Reunion Part 1"	January 25, 2023	0.70
56	16	"Reunion Part 2"	February 1, 2023	0.66
