= The Real Housewives of Salt Lake City season 4 =

Season of television series

The Real Housewives of Salt Lake City
- Season 4
- Promotional poster via Peacock
- Starring: Lisa Barlow; Heather Gay; Meredith Marks; Whitney Rose; Monica Garcia; Angie Katsanevas
- No. of episodes: 19

Release
- Original network: Bravo
- Original release: September 5, 2023 – January 23, 2024

Season chronology
- ← Previous; Season 3 Next → Season 5

The fourth season of The Real Housewives of Salt Lake City, an American reality television series, is broadcast on Bravo. It premiered on September 5, 2023, and was primarily filmed in Salt Lake City, Utah. Its executive producers are Lisa Shannon, Dan Peirson, Lori Gordon, Luke Neslage and Andy Cohen.

The Real Housewives of Salt Lake City focuses on the lives of Lisa Barlow, Heather Gay, Meredith Marks, Whitney Rose, Monica Garcia and Angie Katsanevas, with Mary Cosby appearing as a friend of the housewives.

This season marked the only appearance of Monica Garcia.

== Production and crew ==
Lisa Shannon, Dan Peirson, Lori Gordon, Luke Neslage, Tamara Blaich and Andy Cohen are recognized as the series' executive producers; it is produced and distributed by Shed Media.

== Cast and synopsis ==
Jen Shah departed the series after being sentenced to 6.5 years in prison.

Barlow, Gay, Marks and Rose returned to the series, with Angie Katsanevas being promoted to a full-time cast member. Monica Garcia joined the cast as a housewife, while Mary Cosby returned to the series as a "friend of the housewives".

== Episodes ==
The Real Housewives of Salt Lake City season 4 episodes
No. overall	No. in season	Title	Original release date	U.S. viewers (millions)
57	1	"Fresh Powder, Fresh Start"	September 5, 2023	0.43
With Jen Shah off to prison, Heather wants to get the women together for a fresh start. Angie introduces Jen's former assistant Monica to the group, while the women welcome Mary back into the fold. Lisa reveals her son is going on a Mormon mission. At Heather's event, Whitney and Meredith bump heads over comments Whitney made about Meredith's bathtub.
58	2	"Vacation Crashers"	September 12, 2023	0.41
Lisa and Meredith meet up to squash their beef, finding resolution after a year of fighting. Monica reveals a secret about her past to Heather. Meanwhile, Meredith invites the women on a trip to Palm Springs, with the exception of Angie. Whitney decides to invite Angie anyway, and the two arrive early. Immediately, the trip hits a road bump when Lisa loses a valuable possession.
59	3	"All Tricks, No Trust"	September 19, 2023	0.48
After Angie crashes the group trip, Meredith tries to maintain order. Things quickly devolve into chaos, though, when a party game at dinner leads simmering issues within the group to come to the surface.
60	4	"Don't Be a Drag"	September 26, 2023	0.45
Whitney takes over the Palm Springs trip and hosts a drag event with help from Trixie Mattel, but not all of the women are keen to participate. Monica and Lisa's tension boils into a feud, while Angie and Meredith continue arguing. Meanwhile, Mary finds herself fed up with the women.
61	5	"The Nastiness and Rumors"	October 3, 2023	0.46
Heather checks in on her daughters about the impact her book has had on their lives. Whitney and Justin's relationship issues come to a head with Justin back at work. Lisa hosts a ski-themed event, where she confronts Monica over their tiff in Palm Springs, while a rumor about Angie is revealed.
62	6	"Après Rumor"	October 10, 2023	0.41
The women are divided after rumors emerge about Angie's husband. Meredith is involved in a dramatic driving incident. Meanwhile, Monica and her mother clash over Monica's parenting.
63	7	"An Olive Branch with Thorns"	October 17, 2023	0.49
Angie hosts a Greek Easter party, where Heather expresses her concerns about Jack's mission to Lisa. Angie tries to clarify Monica's role in the rumor about her husband, but things go left when Monica's mom gets involved.
64	8	"Moms, Missions, and Matrimony"	October 31, 2023	0.47
Lisa throws a Mormon mission reveal party to announce the location of Jack's mission. Whitney and Mary meet for lunch but find no resolution. Meanwhile, Monica and her mother's issues worsen over dinner.
65	9	"Don't Come for My Sound Bath"	November 7, 2023	0.45
Angie and Monica find common ground and put their issues on ice. Whitney throws a roller skating birthday party for her daughter, where Lisa and Monica get into a heated argument over Lisa's dismissal of Monica's tumultuous relationship with her mother. At Whitney's Prism event, Lisa and Monica's arguing continues, with Angie stuck in the middle.
66	10	"Mormons Get a Bad Rap"	November 14, 2023	0.49
In the fallout from Whitney's Prism event, Lisa feels betrayed by Angie but finds friendship in Heather. Meanwhile, Heather hosts a book signing for her book Bad Mormon, with a special performance by Lisa.
67	11	"If I Could Churn Back Time"	November 21, 2023	0.47
Whitney and Justin go on Meredith and Seth's podcast and talk about their marriage. Angie and her husband go on an awkward date, leading Angie to ask Whitney for advice. After Heather suggests a group trip to Bermuda to celebrate Monica's birthday, Lisa and Monica agree to try and mend their relationship, but tensions come to a head between the two at Heather's Pioneer Day-themed lunch.
68	12	"Icy Apologies"	November 28, 2023	0.57
Angie and Heather meet up to discuss their hesitations with Monica following Pioneer Day. Meanwhile, Lisa and Meredith have a rocky lunch as the two struggle with their newfound friendship. When Whitney receives sad news about her good friend, the women rally around her, but friction between her and Lisa comes to a head at Meredith's jewelry event.
69	13	"Bermuda Views and Bathtub Blues"	December 5, 2023	0.51
The women arrive in Bermuda for fun in the sun, but the relationship between Lisa and Whitney remains on ice. When Meredith falls ill, she confronts the group over being denied a room with a bathtub. At dinner, Heather and Whitney reignite their feud over their friendships with Lisa.
70	14	"Bermuda Birthday Blues"	December 12, 2023	0.54
The group celebrate Monica's birthday in Bermuda, but things are derailed when Monica receives devastating news. As rumors swirl about Angie, the women rally against Meredith to stop plotting behind their backs. Meanwhile, Monica and Heather butt heads over their differing approaches to discussing sex.
71	15	"Swimming with the Fishes"	December 19, 2023	0.59
On a yacht day in Bermuda, Meredith tries to convince the women she had nothing to do with the rumors about Angie. After reconciling with Lisa, Meredith is confronted by Monica over her perceived double standards. Later, an enraged Whitney attacks Heather over what she wrote about Whitney in her book.
72	16	"Mysteries, Revealed?"	January 2, 2024	0.62
Heather receives a phone call about one of the women that changes everything, leading to an explosive Bermuda Triangle-themed dinner. Rumors and accusations fly, including a long-awaited reveal regarding Heather's black eye.
73	17	"Reunion Part 1"	January 9, 2024	0.81
The women reunite, coming face-to-face with Monica for the first time following the Bermuda dinner. Monica discusses her affair and how she came to work for Jen Shah. Angie calls out Monica for spreading rumors about her husband, while Meredith attempts to defend herself after a season of accusations.
74	18	"Reunion Part 2"	January 16, 2024	0.76
Monica discusses her tumultuous relationship with her mother. Angie gets heated over Monica's online claims about the events of Greek Easter. Mary joins the women, coming to Monica's defense as she rehashes her issues with the group, while she and Whitney attempt to finally move forward.
75	19	"Reunion Part 3"	January 23, 2024	0.74
The reunion concludes with a discussion on the dramatic Monica reveal in Bermuda. Monica continues to defend her behavior and running a social media account, while the women look to hold her accountable. Andy questions Heather over her black eye lie and she reflects on her friendship with Jen. The women and Monica hit a stalemate, unable to move forward.
