= Wife Swap: The Real Housewives Edition =

- Genre: Reality
- Based on: Wife Swap
- Starring: Melissa Gorga; Angie Katsanevas; Wendy Osefo; Emily Simpson; Lisa Barlow; Stephanie Hollman; Gina Kirschenheiter; Crystal Kung Minkoff; Angela Oakley; Phaedra Parks
- Country of origin: United States
- Original language: English
- No. of seasons: 1
- No. of episodes: 4

Production
- Executive producers: Lauren Eskelin; Lorraine Haughton; Glenda Hersh; Rebecca Hertz; Jamie Jakimo; Jennifer Lane; Lorraine Lawson; Steven Weinstock
- Camera setup: Multiple
- Running time: 41–43 minutes
- Production company: Truly Original

Original release
- Network: Bravo
- Release: October 21, 2025 – present

Related
- Wife Swap; Celebrity Wife Swap

Wife Swap: The Real Housewives Edition is an American reality television series that premiered on October 21, 2025, on Bravo. Based on the hit global format, the series is a spin-off of Bravo's The Real Housewives franchise and the American Wife Swap series.

Each standalone episode follows a different "Real Housewife" and real wife, as they navigate swapping their everyday comforts and luxuries to fully immerse themselves in a vastly different familial experience.

== Overview ==
Bravo announced the series in May 2025. The series stars several cast members of Bravo's Real Housewives franchise, with each episode following a different "Real Housewife" and real wife as they swap lives. The cast features Melissa Gorga, Angie Katsanevas, Wendy Osefo, and Emily Simpson.

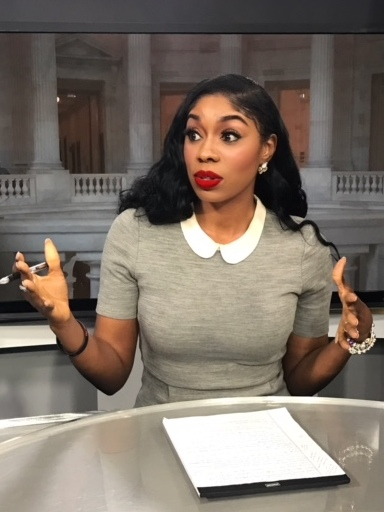
Cast member, Wendy Osefo

Initially set to premiere on October 14, 2025, Bravo pulled the premiere episode, which was to feature Osefo, following her arrest for fraud charges on October 9, 2025. However, by October 20, 2025, Bravo reversed their decision and rescheduled Osefo's episode to air on November 9, 2025. The series premiered on October 21, 2025.

In May 2026, the series was renewed for a second season. The second season is set to premiere on December 30, 2026, with Angela Oakley, Lisa Barlow, Crystal Kung Minkoff, Stephanie Hollman, Gina Kirschenheiter, and Phaedra Parks joining the cast.

== Cast ==
Timeline of the cast
Cast member	Franchise	Seasons	
Cast member	Franchise	1	2
Melissa Gorga	New Jersey	Main	
Angie Katsanevas	Salt Lake City	Main	
Wendy Osefo	Potomac	Main	
Emily Simpson	Orange County	Main	
Lisa Barlow	Salt Lake City		Main
Stephanie Hollman	Dallas		Main
Gina Kirschenheiter	Orange County	Guest	Main
Crystal Kung Minkoff	Beverly Hills		Main
Angela Oakley	Atlanta		Main
Phaedra Parks	Atlanta	Guest	Main

=== Series overview ===
Season	Episodes	Originally released	
Season	Episodes	First released	Last released
1	4	October 21, 2025	November 9, 2025
2	TBA	December 30, 2026	TBA

== Season 1 (2025) ==
No.	Title	Original release date	U.S. viewers (millions)
1	"Overdressed and Underprepared"	October 21, 2025	0.296
Families: Katsanevas and Flake
2	"Too Cool for Gabagool"	October 28, 2025	0.288
Families: Gorga and Clark
3	"Daddy Duties vs. Daddy Dont's"	November 4, 2025	0.263
Families: Simpson and Svensson
4	"All Is Ferret in Love and War"	November 9, 2025 (Note: Originally set to premiere October 14, 2025, Bravo pulled the episode following Osefo's arrest for fraud charges on October 9, 2025. However, Bravo rescheduled the episode on October 20, 2025.)	0.305
Families: Osefo and Shapiro
