= Monica Garcia (reality television personality) =

American television personality

- Occupation: Television personality
- Known for: The Real Housewives of Salt Lake City
- Children: 5

Monica Garcia is an American reality television personality best known for appearing as a cast member on the fourth season of the Bravo series The Real Housewives of Salt Lake City and for voicing EVA 2.0 on the second season of E! series House of Villains.

== Early life ==
Monica Garcia was raised by her mother, Linda Darnell. Garcia revealed in an episode of The Real Housewives of Salt Lake City that her father abandoned her when she was four years old because he was gay and had a boyfriend. Garcia stated that her father moved to Florida and that they are not in contact. Garcia's relationship with her mother is strained. Garcia claimed that her mother dropped her off with family in Pennsylvania at age 12 while she moved to New York, which gave her severe abandonment issues.

== Career ==
=== Brea Baby ===
Garcia founded Brea Baby, which sells baby swaddles, blankets, and crib sheets. Garcia stated that she started the company to help struggling mothers after reflecting on her own feelings of failure as a mother.

=== The Real Housewives of Salt Lake City ===
Garcia joined the cast of The Real Housewives of Salt Lake City in season 4 after briefly working for former housewife Jen Shah. Garcia's relationship with Shah, including her involvement as a witness in the federal case against Shah, was a major reason for her casting on the show. Throughout the season, Garcia discussed various sensitive aspects of her life, including her struggles as a single mother and her complicated relationship with her own mother. In the finale, fellow castmate Heather Gay revealed that Garcia was secretly involved with an Instagram gossip account called "Reality Von Tease," which was known for posting defamatory and otherwise sensitive information about the rest of the cast. Gay learned of Garcia's involvement in the account via her longtime hairdresser, Tenesha, who was also friends with Garcia. Although she admitted her involvement in the account, Garcia maintained that she only posted information about Shah. Additionally, fellow castmate Meredith Marks accused Garcia of stealing a purse from Marks's Park City store.

The finale exposing Garcia's various lies became a pop culture phenomenon and was referenced by U.S. Rep. Robert Garcia (D-CA) during a House Oversight Committee. After the finale, producer Andy Cohen revealed that Garcia would not be returning to the show and would instead have a "cooling-off period" because she was unable to make amends with her fellow castmates.

== Personal life ==
Garcia married Mike Fowler in a Church of Jesus Christ of Latter-day Saints temple in 2009. They have three children together: Jaidyn, West, and Kendall. Garcia's eldest daughter, Bri, was fathered from a previous relationship. Garcia filed for divorce in December 2013, citing "irreconcilable differences." However, the divorce was dismissed by a judge the following year and the couple remained married. In 2023, Garcia filed for a second divorce after having an extramarital affair with the husband of her ex-husband's sister (her brother-in-law at the time). As a result of this affair, Garcia was excommunicated from the LDS Church. Garcia later revealed that her marriage to Fowler ended not because of the affair, but due to domestic violence, including a 2021 incident where Fowler slapped Garcia across the face.

Shortly after leaving The Real Housewives franchise, Garcia announced she was pregnant on an episode of The Viall Files. However, in April 2024, Garcia revealed that she had suffered a miscarriage.

Garcia gave birth to a fifth child, a daughter, in April 2025 with boyfriend Braxton Knight.

== Legal issues ==
In November 2023, Garcia was sued by Beauty Lab + Laser LLC, which is co-owned by fellow Real Housewives of Salt Lake City castmate Heather Gay. The suit accused Garcia of only paying $449 of $2,449 for a series of "cosmetic injections" she received on December 10, 2019, four years before she joined the show. Garcia countersued, alleging that she received "botched" injections that required a third party to fix the damage to her lips and nose and seeking less than $50,000 in damages. Garcia's countersuit was dismissed due to the statute of limitations and other technical deficiencies in her claim. In November 2024, Garcia was ordered to pay Beauty Lab + Laser a sum of $35,853.60. In a statement posted to Instagram, Garcia criticized the decision and indicated that she planned to appeal the final judgment.

In November 2024, Garcia was sued by APG Financial, who alleged that Garcia defaulted under a lease agreement to purchase her 2018 Cadlliac XT5 and that she had damaged the vehicle. APG Financial sought to recover $9,322.87 in damages.

== Filmography ==
Year	Title	Notes
2025	The Viall Files	
2024	House of Villains	Main cast (season 2): EVA 2.0 (voice); self
2024	Discretion Advised	
2023	Watch What Happens Live with Andy Cohen	
2021 – 2024	The Real Housewives of Salt Lake City	Main cast (season 4); uncredited (season 2)
