= Slippery slope (disambiguation) =

A Slippery slope argument is a type of rhetorical argument.

Slippery slope may also refer to:

- Slippery Slope, a 2006 film
- "Slippery Slope" (Highway Thru Hell), a 2017 television episode
- "Slippery Slope" (Kim's Convenience), a 2021 television episode
- "Slippery Slope" (The Real Housewives of Salt Lake City), a 2021 television episode
- "A Slippery Slope" (The Real Housewives of New York City), a 2017 television episode
- "A Slippery Slope" (Winter House), a 2021 television episode
- The Slippery Slope, a 2003 children's novel
