= The Traitors (American TV series) season 5 =

The Traitors
- Season 5
- Promotional poster
- Presented by: Alan Cumming
- No. of contestants: 23
- Location: Ardross Castle, Scottish Highlands

Release
- Original network: Peacock

Season chronology
- ← Previous; Season 4

The fifth season of the American television series The Traitors was announced on May 11, 2026, and is set to premiere on January 14, 2027.

== Format ==
The show retained the same format and challenges as the The Traitors UK. The arrived contestants at the castle are referred to as the "Faithful," and among them are the "Traitors," a group of contestants secretly selected by the host, Alan Cumming. Each night, the Traitors would decide who to "murder," and that same contestant would leave the game. After the end of each day, where the contestants participated in various challenges to add money to the prize fund, they would participate in the Round Table, where they must decide who to banish from the game, trying to identify the Traitor.

If all the remaining players are Faithful, then the prize money is divided evenly among them. However, if any Traitors remain, they win the entire pot.

== Contestants ==
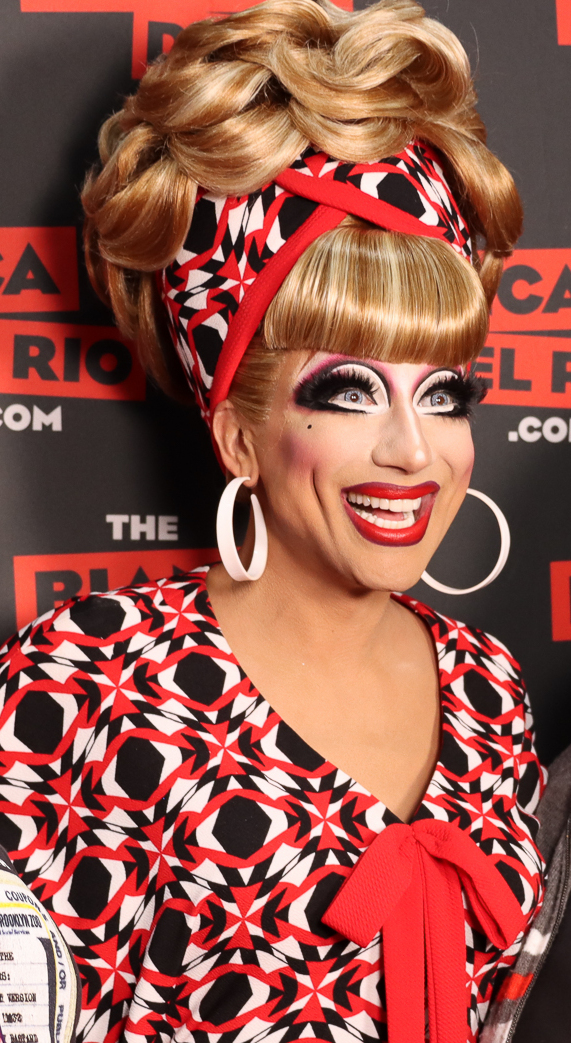
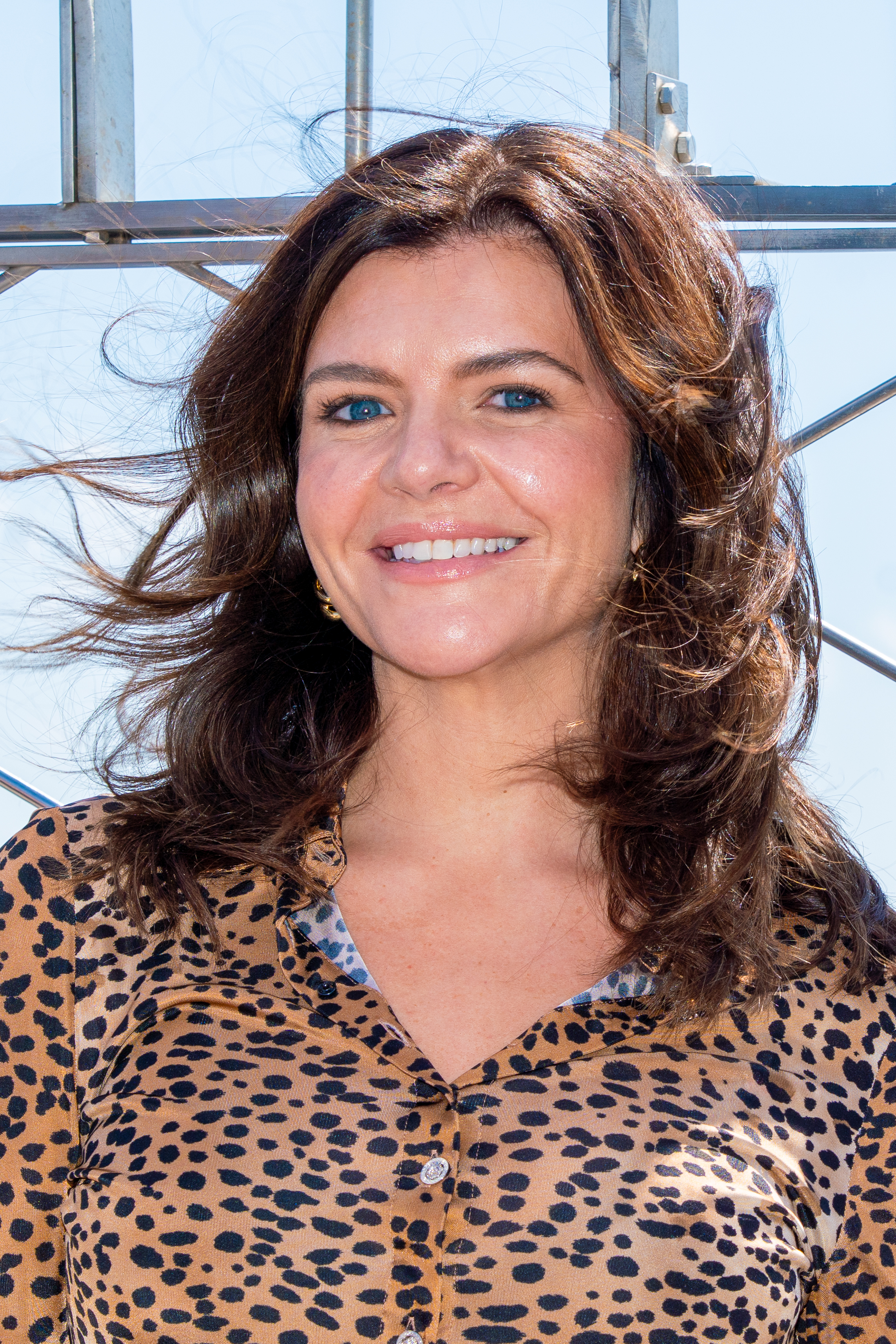
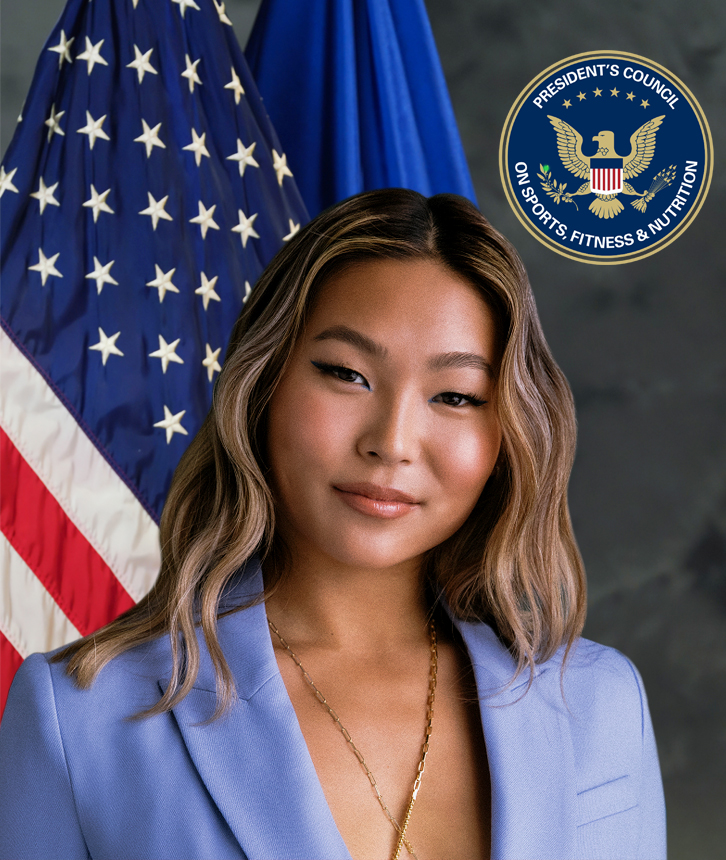
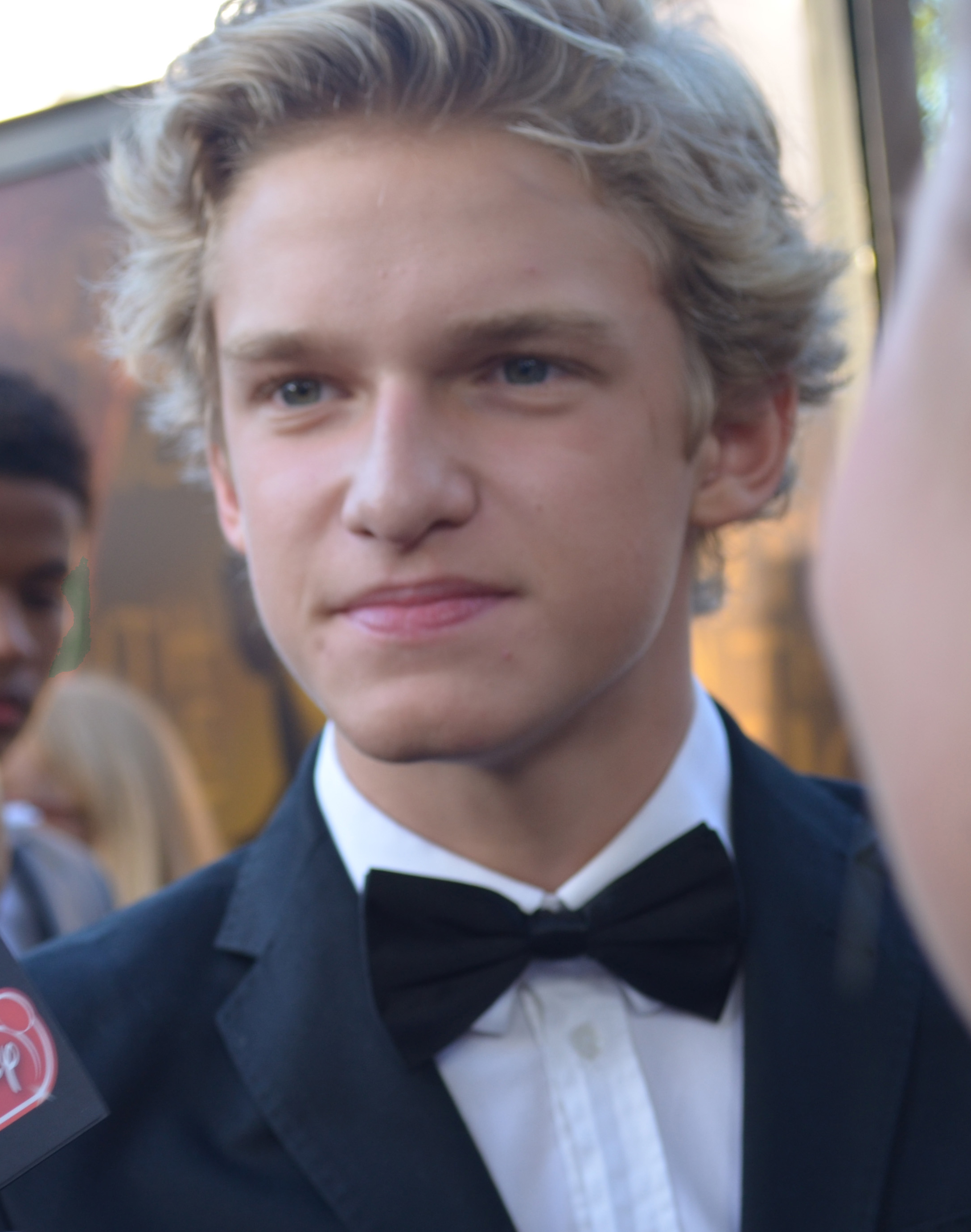
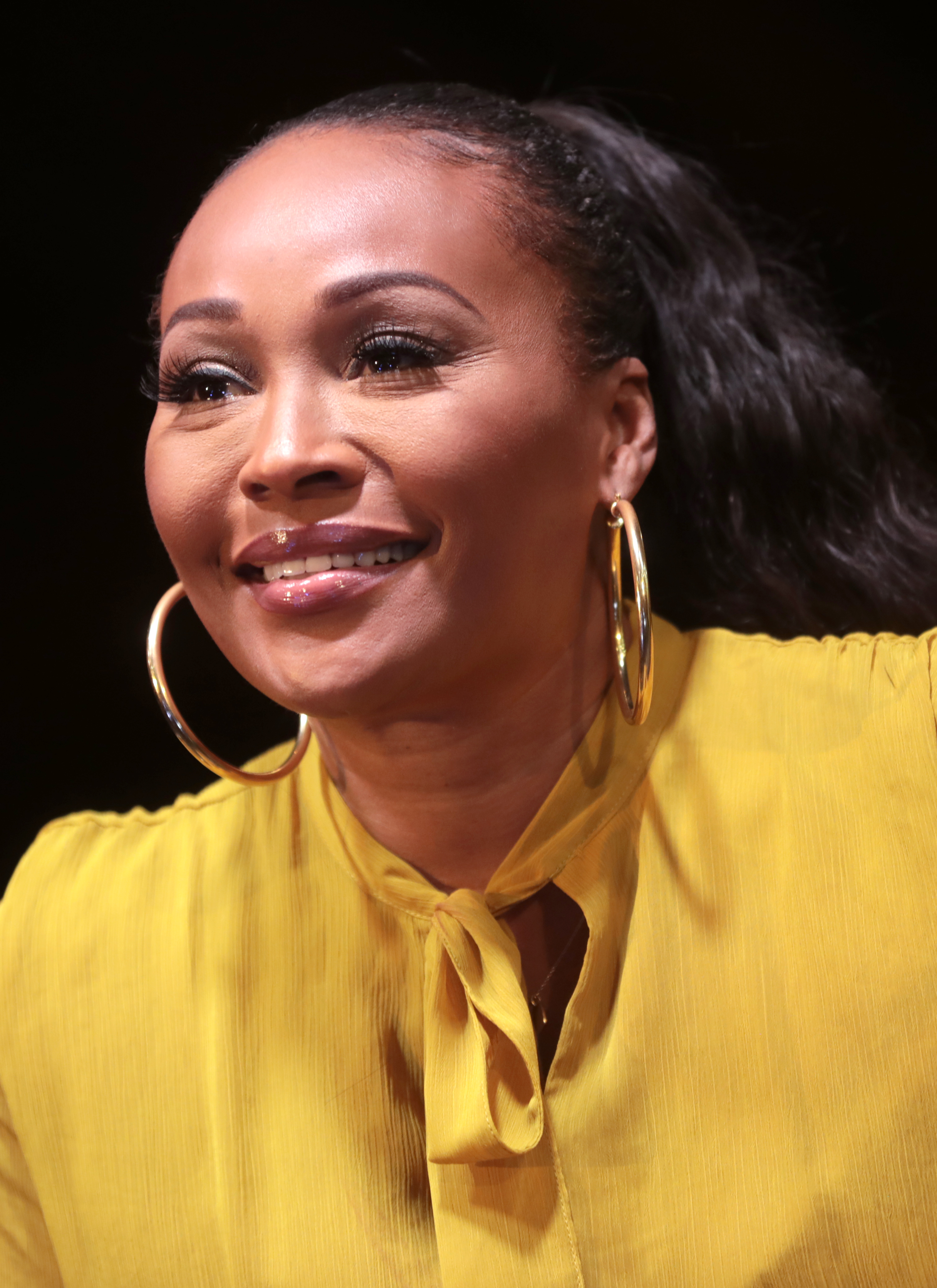
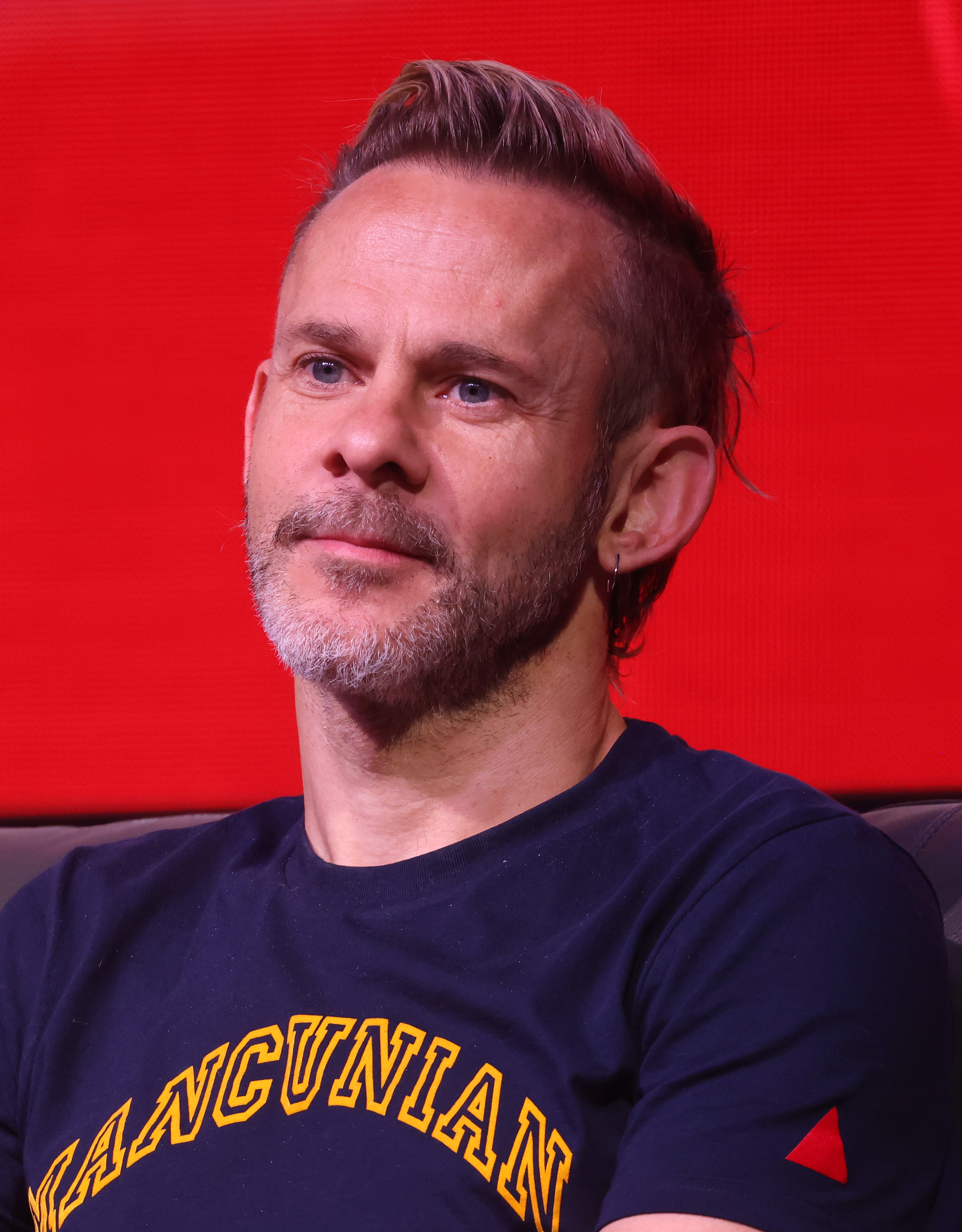
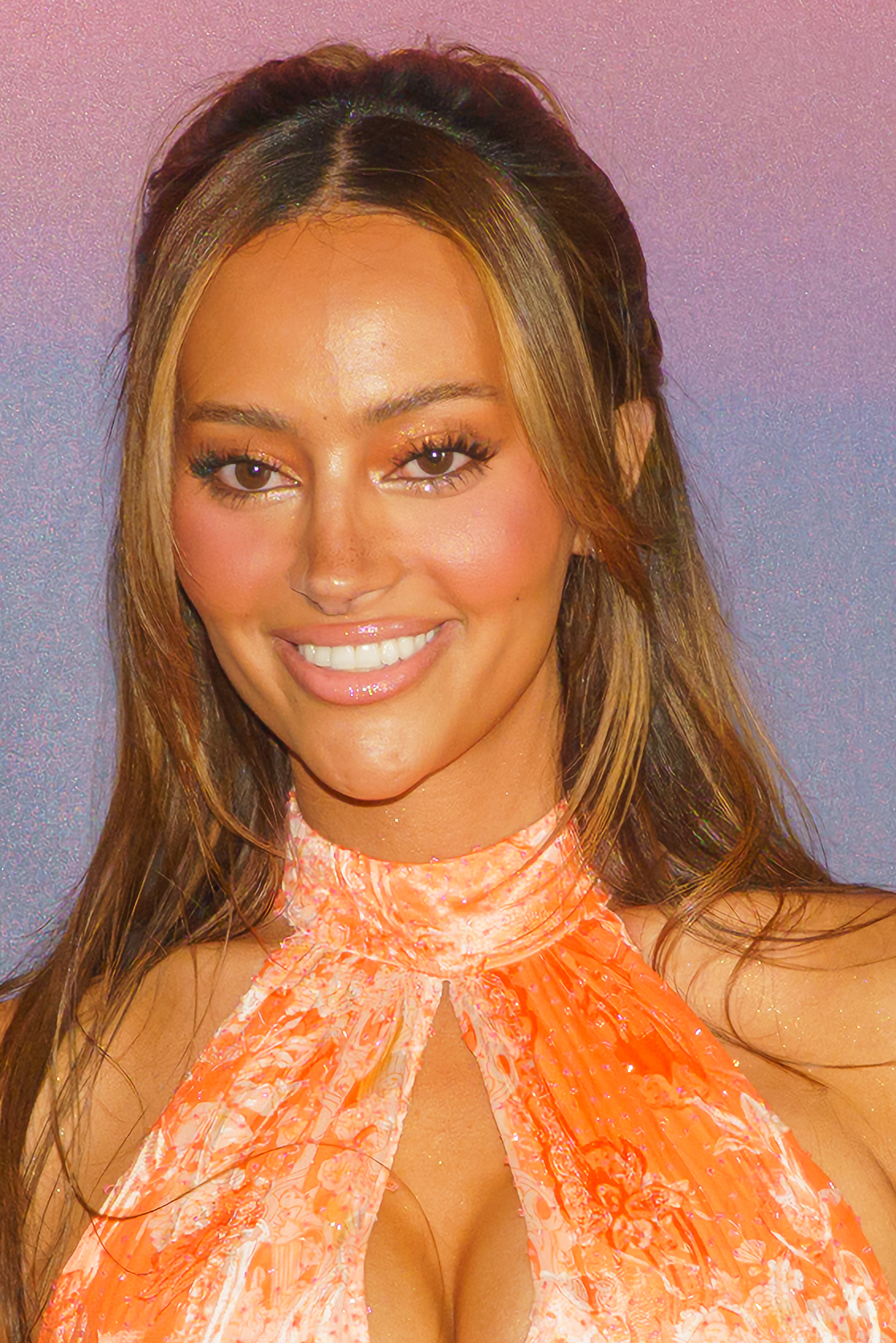
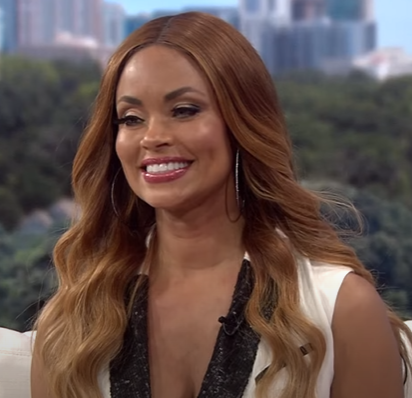
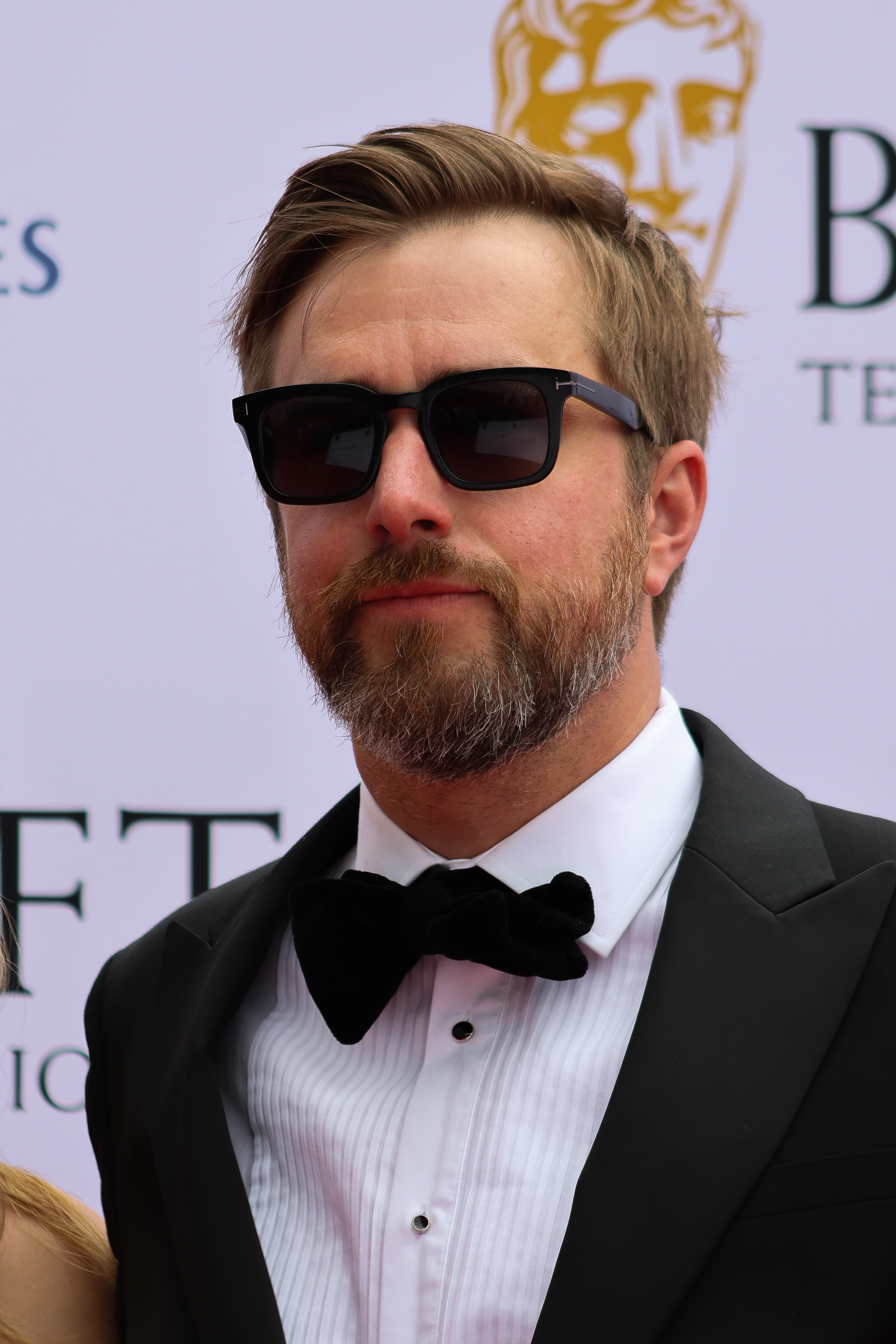
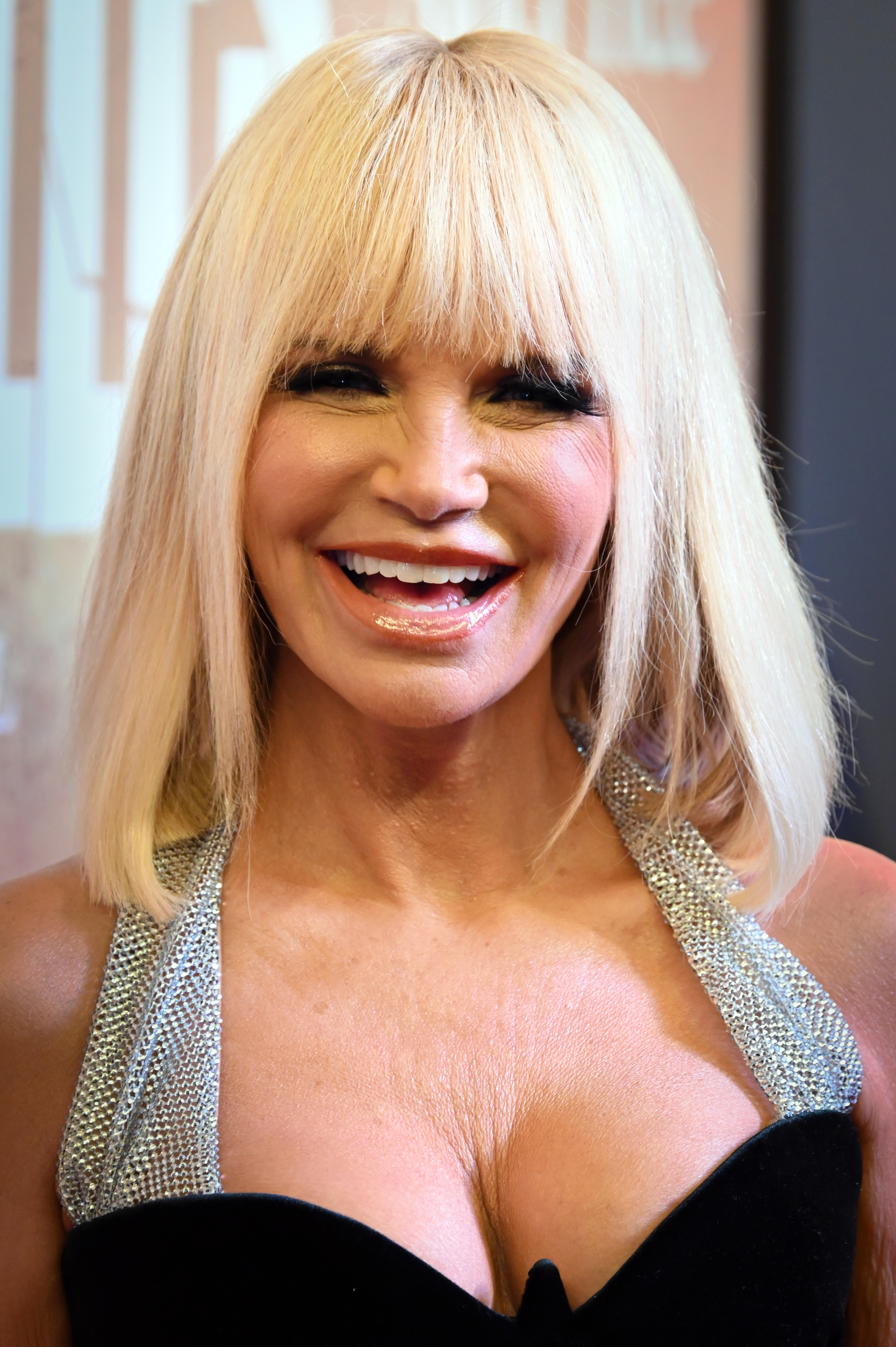
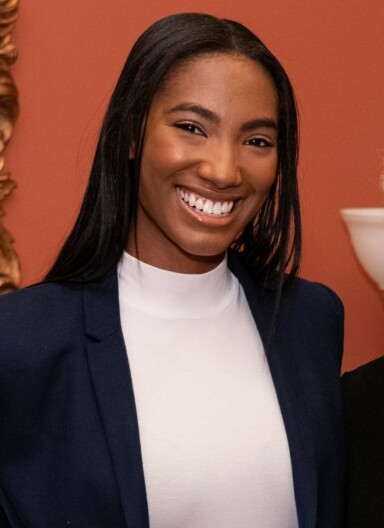
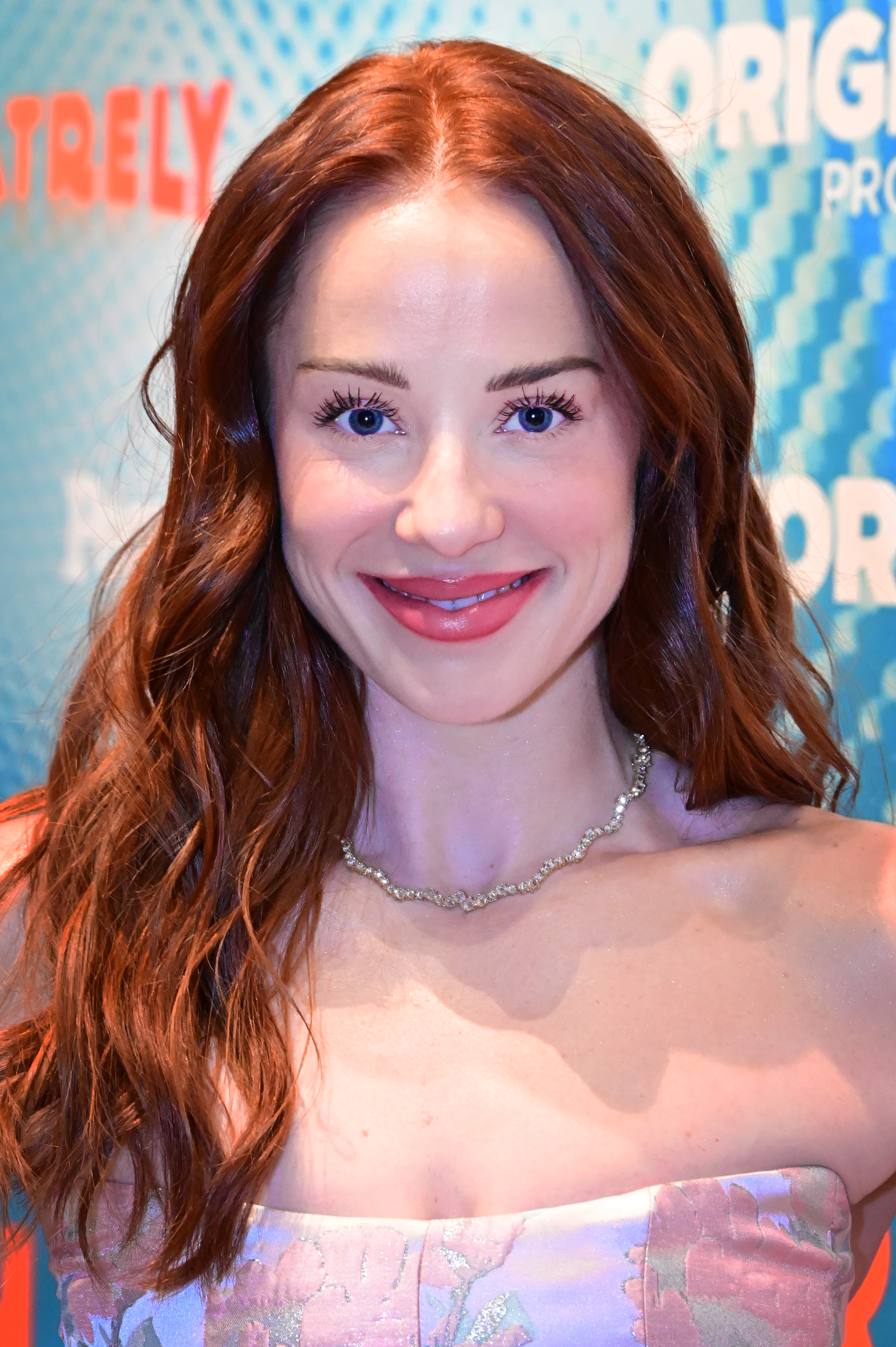
Top row (L-R): Bianca Del Rio, Bronwyn Newport, Casey Wilson, Chloe Kim, Cody Simpson, and Cynthia Bailey
Bottom row (L-R): Dominic Monaghan, Emira D'Spain, Gizelle Bryant, Iain Stirling, Kristin Chenoweth, Taylor Hale and Whitney Leavitt

Similar to the second through fourth seasons, this season's cast was composed entirely of reality show participants and public figures. Peacock announced the 23 cast members via social media on September 18, 2026.

List of The Traitors contestants
Contestant	Age	Notability/Debut series	Affiliation	Finish
Bianca Del Rio	51	RuPaul's Drag Race 6	TBA	TBA
Boman Martinez-Reid	28	Content creator	TBA	TBA
Bronwyn Newport	41	The Real Housewives of Salt Lake City	TBA	TBA
Casey Wilson	45	Actress	TBA	TBA
Chloe Kim	26	Professional snowboarder	TBA	TBA
Cody Simpson	29	Singer	TBA	TBA
Craig Conover	37	Southern Charm	TBA	TBA
Cynthia Bailey	59	The Real Housewives of Atlanta	TBA	TBA
Dominic Monaghan	49	Actor	TBA	TBA
Emira D'Spain	29	Next Gen NYC	TBA	TBA
Gizelle Bryant	56	The Real Housewives of Potomac	TBA	TBA
Iain Stirling	38	Comedian/Love Island narrator	TBA	TBA
Jag Bains	28	Big Brother 25	TBA	TBA
JaNa Craig	29	Love Island USA 6	TBA	TBA
Joey Graziadei	31	The Bachelorette 20	TBA	TBA
Johnny Sibilly	39	Actor	TBA	TBA
Kristin Chenoweth	58	Actress/Singer	TBA	TBA
Michele Fitzgerald	36	Survivor: Kaôh Rōng	TBA	TBA
Q Burdette	32	Survivor 46	TBA	TBA
Rachel Robinson	43	Road Rules: Campus Crawl	TBA	TBA
Rashad Jennings	41	Former NFL player	TBA	TBA
Taylor Hale	31	Big Brother 24	TBA	TBA
Whitney Leavitt	33	The Secret Lives of Mormon Wives	TBA	TBA

== Elimination history ==
Key
The contestant was a Faithful
The contestant was a Traitor
The contestant was ineligible to vote

Episode	1	2	3	4	5	6	7	8	9	10	11
Traitors' decision											
Shield											
Banishment											
Vote											
Bianca											
Boman											
Bronwyn											
Casey											
Chloe											
Cody											
Craig											
Cynthia											
Dominic											
Emira											
Gizelle											
Iain											
Jag											
JaNa											
Joey											
Johnny											
Kristin											
Michele											
Q											
Rachel											
Rashad											
Taylor											
Whitney											

== Production ==
Similar to the previous seasons, this season was primary filmed in Ardross Castle in the Scottish Highlands.
