= Surviving Mormonism with Heather Gay =

- Genre: Reality
- Starring: Heather Gay
- Country of origin: United States
- Original language: English
- No. of episodes: 3

Production
- Executive producers: Heather Gay; Eli Holzman; Aaron Saidman; Erin Gamble
- Camera setup: Multiple
- Running time: 41–43 minutes
- Production company: The Intellectual Property Corporation

Original release
- Network: Bravo (ep. 1); Peacock (ep. 2–3)
- Release: November 11 – November 12, 2025

Related
- The Real Housewives of Salt Lake City

Surviving Mormonism with Heather Gay is an American reality television series that premiered on November 11, 2025, on Bravo.

The limited series sees The Real Housewives of Salt Lake City star Heather Gay uncovering the dark history of the Church of Jesus Christ of Latter-day Saints (LDS Church).

== Overview ==
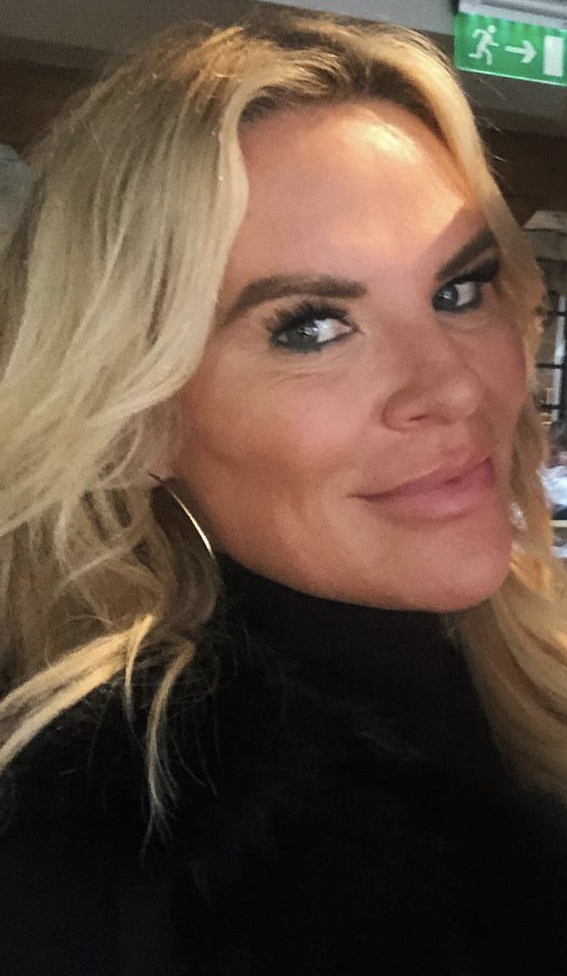
Series star Gay has been open about distancing herself from the LDS Church.

Bravo announced the series on October 21, 2025.

Each episode features Gay having impactful conversations with abuse survivors, ex-Mormons, and former LDS church leaders. Gay also reflects on her own departure from the church, with the limited series delving into outdated and controversial practices and empowering victims to share their own experiences to bring awareness and enact change.

The series premiered on November 11, 2025, on Bravo, with all episodes being released exclusively on November 12, 2025, on Peacock.

== Episodes ==
No.	Title	Original release date	U.S. viewers (millions)
1	"A Bad Mormon"	November 11, 2025	0.170
2	"The Highest Level of Heaven"	November 12, 2025	N/A
3	"Change Is Gonna Come"	November 12, 2025	N/A
