= Kérastase =

French international luxury haircare brand

- Type: Subsidiary
- Industry: Beauty
- Founded: 1964; 62 years ago
- Founder: François Dalle
- Headquarters: Paris, France
- Products: Hair Care
- Parent: L'Oréal (1964–present)
- Website: www.kerastase.com

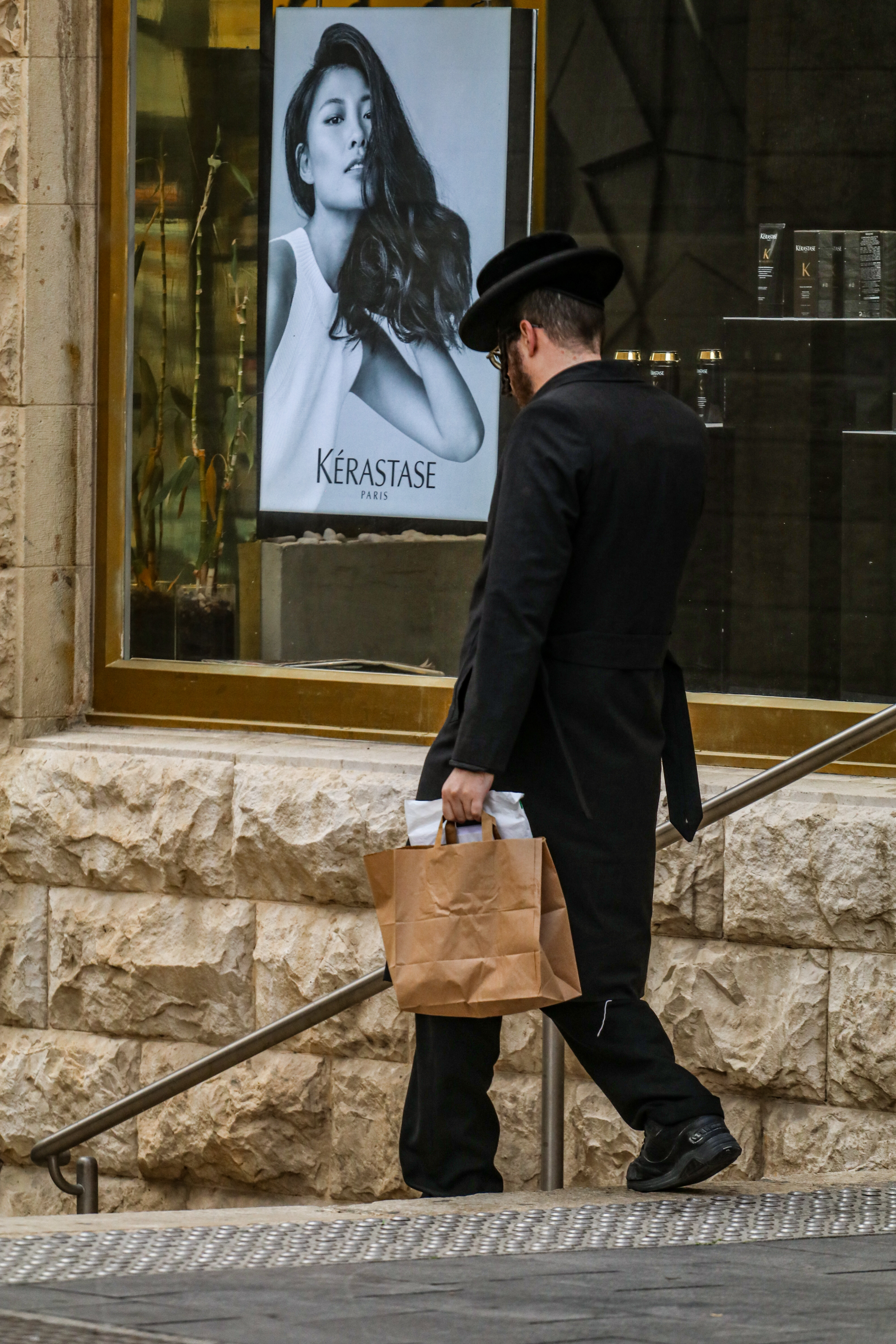
Shopfront in Israel promoting Kérastase products in 2023

Kérastase (French pronunciation: [keʁastaz]) is a French luxury hair and scalp care line that distributes products internationally. Kérastase is part of the L'Oréal Professional Products Division.

== History ==
Kérastase was founded in 1964 by scientists at L’Oreal Advanced Research.

== Products ==
Kérastase sells hair care and styling products at its salons, through its e-commerce site, and at Sephora and Douglas.

== Ambassadors ==
- Emily Ratajkowski (2018)
- Angie Katsanevas (2021)
- Sydney Sweeney (2024)
- Jang Won-young (2024)
- Demi Moore (2026)

== See also ==
- L'Oréal Professionnel
