= The Real Housewives of Salt Lake City =

American reality television series

- Genre: Reality
- Starring: Lisa Barlow; Mary Cosby; Heather Gay; Meredith Marks; Whitney Rose; Jen Shah; Jennie Nguyen; Monica Garcia; Angie Katsanevas; Bronwyn Newport
- Country of origin: United States
- Original language: English
- No. of seasons: 7
- No. of episodes: 123 (list of episodes)

Production
- Executive producers: Lisa Shannon; Dan Peirson; Lori Gordon; Chaz Morgan; Sergio Alfaro; Tamara Blaich; Simone Hilliard; Tia Ayers; Andy Cohen
- Production company: Shed Media

Original release
- Network: Bravo
- Release: November 11, 2020 – present

Related
- Surviving Mormonism with Heather Gay

The Real Housewives of Salt Lake City (abbreviated as RHOSLC) is an American reality television series originally developed and cast by Los Angeles-based production company InventTV and then Shed Media. It is broadcast on Bravo. The Salt Lake City series is the tenth installment of The Real Housewives franchise, and it follows the personal and professional lives of women who live in or near Salt Lake City, Utah.

The first season consisted of original cast members: Lisa Barlow, Mary Cosby, Heather Gay, Meredith Marks, Whitney Rose and Jen Shah. The show's current cast includes Barlow, Gay, Marks, Rose, Cosby, Angie Katsanevas and Bronwyn Newport, with Britani Bateman and Ashley Quai serving as "friends of the housewives". Previous housewives include Shah, Jennie Nguyen and Monica Garcia.

Commercially, the second season achieved the highest average viewership of 0.71 million, while the fifth season and sixth season had the lowest at 0.43 million. The controversial season four finale is the highest-viewed episode in the series, averaging over two million viewers across all platforms.

== Production ==
=== Seasons 1–3 ===
The Real Housewives of Salt Lake City was announced at the BravoCon fan convention in New York City on November 16, 2019. The first season was created, cast, and produced by InventTV. Lisa Barlow, Mary Cosby, Heather Gay, Meredith Marks, Whitney Rose and Jen Shah were announced as the cast members for the show's debut season on September 9, 2020. The season premiered on November 11, 2020, and concluded on February 24, 2021.

In February 2021, Bravo renewed the show for a second season. For the second season, all six original cast members returned, along with additional housewife Jennie Nguyen (who had connections through Barlow). Angie Harrington, a friend of Barlow's, was originally cast in a recurring role but ended up appearing as a guest throughout the season. The second season premiered on September 12 of the same year and ended on March 13, 2022. Cosby did not attend the season's reunion special, and it was confirmed by Bravo producer and host Andy Cohen that she had left the show. Prior to the show's reunion, Bravo fired Nguyen after discovering insensitive posts on her Facebook account criticizing the Black Lives Matter movement. Nguyen had denied the allegations and blamed her social media team.

Bravo renewed the show for a third season, bringing back all five remaining cast members. Harrington returned and was promoted to a recurring role as Gay's friend. Additionally, two new women joined the cast in recurring roles: Danna Bui-Negrete as Gay's friend, and Angie Katsanevas as Shah's friend (Katsanevas was later referred to as Shah's former friend throughout the season). The third season premiered on September 28, 2022, and ended on February 1, 2023. Shah did not attend the season's reunion because of ongoing legal issues, and she was later fired after being sentenced to prison.

=== Seasons 4–6 ===
Bravo renewed the show for a fourth season in March 2023, giving Peacock additional distribution rights. The four remaining cast members (Barlow, Gay, Marks and Rose) returned to the series. Katsanevas was promoted to a full-time role, while Bui-Negrete appeared as a guest throughout the season. Harrington was offered to return for season 4, but she declined in order to focus on her family. Monica Garcia was announced as a new cast member, with connections to Katsanevas and former cast member Jen Shah. Additionally, original housewife Mary Cosby returned as a recurring cast member due to her connections with Marks.

The fourth season premiered on September 5, 2023 Despite low live viewership, season 4 had high ratings, averaging 1.9 million total viewers and 1.1 million demo viewers among adults 18-49 across all platforms, a 20% increase over the previous season. The season finale reached new highs of 2.0 million viewers across all platforms.

Several publications noted season 4 as one of the show's standout seasons. Some critics hailed it as one of the best seasons in the show's franchise, many pointing to the success of the mystery surrounding Garcia.

In January 2024, the show was renewed for a fifth season by Bravo, but Garcia was confirmed to not be returning. The five remaining cast members all returned. Production on the new season began on February 5. The fifth season premiered on September 18, 2024, with Cosby being re-upgraded as a housewife with new addition Bronwyn Newport; newcomers Britani Bateman and Meili Workman join the cast as friends of the housewives.

On June 9, 2025, key Real Housewives of Salt Lake City executive Lauren Miller died soon after giving birth. The sixth season premiered on September 16, 2025, with all of the cast from the previous season returning except for Workman.

=== Season 7 ===
In February 2026, production on the seventh season was suspended until "further notice" following the death of Cosby's son, Robert Cosby Jr. It resumed the following month with Cosby choosing to resume filming full time. The season premiered on September 16, 2026. Returning housewives from the previous season include Barlow, Cosby, Gay, Katsanevas, Marks, Newport, and Rose. Bateman returns for her third consecutive season in a "friend of" capacity, while Ashley Quai is introduced as a new friend of the housewives. The season will also reintroduce Cosby's husband, Robert Sr., following his decision to not film the season prior.

== Cast ==
Timeline of the cast
Cast member	Seasons						
Cast member	1	2	3	4	5	6	7
Lisa Barlow	Main	Main	Main	Main	Main	Main	Main
Mary Cosby	Main	Main		Friend	Main	Main	Main
Heather Gay	Main	Main	Main	Main	Main	Main	Main
Meredith Marks	Main	Main	Main	Main	Main	Main	Main
Whitney Rose	Main	Main	Main	Main	Main	Main	Main
Jen Shah	Main	Main	Main				
Jennie Nguyen		Main					
Monica Garcia				Main			
Angie Katsanevas		Guest	Friend	Main	Main	Main	Main
Bronwyn Newport					Main	Main	Main
Friends of the housewives
Angie Harrington	Guest	Guest	Friend				
Danna Bui-Negrete			Friend	Guest			
Britani Bateman					Friend	Friend	Friend
Meili Workman					Friend		
Ashley Quai							Friend

== Controversies ==
During filming of the second season, Shah was arrested on March 30, 2021, for wire fraud and money laundering via running a nationwide telemarketing scheme that targeted the elderly and vulnerable working-class people. On July 11, 2022, Shah pleaded guilty to conspiracy to commit wire fraud and was sentenced to 6.5 years in prison on January 6, 2023. She began her prison sentence on February 17 of the same year. Her sentence has since been repeatedly reduced and Shah was released from prison on December 10, 2025.

== Episodes ==
The Real Housewives of Salt Lake City episodes
Season	Episodes	Originally released		Average Viewers
Season	Episodes	First released	Last released	Average Viewers
1	16	November 11, 2020	February 24, 2021	0.61
2	24	September 12, 2021	March 13, 2022	0.71
3	16	September 28, 2022	February 1, 2023	0.62
4	19	September 5, 2023	January 23, 2024	0.53
5	19	September 18, 2024	February 5, 2025	0.43
6	19	September 16, 2025	January 27, 2026	0.43
7	TBA	September 16, 2026	TBA	TBA

== Reception ==
=== Ratings ===
The Real Housewives of Salt Lake City : U.S. viewers per episode (thousands)

Season	Episode number																								Average
Season	1	2	3	4	5	6	7	8	9	10	11	12	13	14	15	16	17	18	19	20	21	22	23	24	Average
1	790	660	540	710	660	680	560	580	490	570	670	480	520	540	780	590	–								610
2	810	750	610	630	670	720	710	560	700	820	770	720	700	680	690	780	840	690	720	710	600	640	710	810	710
3	690	670	710	640	630	560	430	540	520	560	610	670	610	690	700	660	–								620
4	430	410	480	480	460	410	480	460	440	490	470	570	510	540	590	620	810	760	740	–					530
5	380	400	330	380	360	400	340	350	380	440	350	480	420	520	540	530	570	580	480	–					430
6	370	490	370	470	350	420	420	420	450	400	420	420	460	430	330	540	320	520	620	–					430
7	TBD	TBD	370	390	420	420	400	330	TBD	–															380

Audience measurement performed by Nielsen Media Research

== Spin-off ==
In October 2025, Bravo announced Gay would appear in the three-part limited series, Surviving Mormonism with Heather Gay. The series is set to premiere on November 11, 2025 on Bravo, with all episodes being released exclusively on November 12, 2025 on Peacock.

The series follows Gay, as she investigates the “dark history” of the Church of Jesus Christ of Latter-day Saints (LDS), speaking with ex‑members, survivors of abuse, and former church leaders, while drawing on her own departure from the faith.
