= Bronwyn Newport =

American television personality (born 1985)

- Newport in 2026
- Born: 10 September 1985 (age 41); São Paulo, Brazil
- Citizenship: Brazil; United Kingdom; United States
- Occupations: Television personality; fashion blogger; Broadway producer
- Spouse: Todd Bradley (m. 2016; sep. 2025)
- Children: 1
- Website: bronwynnewport.com

Bronwyn Newport (born 10 September 1985) is a television personality, fashion blogger, and Broadway producer with citizenship in Brazil, the United Kingdom, and the United States. Since 2024, she has starred in the Bravo reality television series The Real Housewives of Salt Lake City.

== Early life ==
Newport was born in São Paulo to father David and mother Marge; she is of Welsh descent through her father. She grew up between San Francisco and the Hague. She attended Brigham Young University, but after becoming pregnant out of wedlock at the age of 19, she was suspended and subsequently opted not to return to the university.

== Career ==
Newport began her career in finance, working as an assistant at a trading desk for a bank. She later became a fashion blogger. She has served on the boards of Ballet West and KultureCity. During the COVID-19 pandemic, she completed a degree in art history.

In 2024, she joined the cast of the Bravo reality television series The Real Housewives of Salt Lake City. Prior to joining The Real Housewives, she had never seen an episode of the franchise. That year, she co-produced the Broadway revival of Cabaret and collaborated with BedHead PJs to design a limited edition collection of pajamas for the brand. She and her husband also co-sponsored a gala to save the Laurie Beechman Theatre and West Bank Cafe from closure.

In June 2025, she co-chaired Ballet West's Spring Soirée. Later that year, she hosted the Daily Front Row Fashion Media Awards at New York Fashion Week. She also co-produced the Broadway production of The Queen of Versailles and became a fashion correspondent for Reality Hot Seat, an NBC Sunday Night Football simulcast by Peacock and the National Football League.

In April 2026, she was announced as a guest judge on the 11th season of RuPaul's Drag Race All Stars.

== Personal life ==
Newport grew up in the Church of Jesus Christ of Latter-day Saints. She holds dual Brazilian and British citizenship. In 2025, she became a naturalized American citizen.

She became pregnant out of wedlock while a student at Brigham Young University; she has one daughter, Gwen. She married Todd Bradley, former CEO of Palm, Inc., in 2016. On December 12, 2025, it was announced that the couple had separated after nine years of marriage.

=== Activism ===
Newport is a supporter of transgender rights, and attended a rally for transgender youth outside the United States Supreme Court Building in December 2024. She has also worked with LGBTQ rights organizations in Utah, including Encircle, the Utah Pride Center, and Equality Utah.

== Filmography ==
Key
†	Denotes television productions that have not yet been released

Year	Title	Notes	Ref.
2024–present	The Real Housewives of Salt Lake City	Main cast (season 5–present)	
2024–2025	Watch What Happens Live with Andy Cohen	Guest; 4 episodes	
2026	RuPaul's Drag Race All Stars	Guest judge	
2027	The Traitors †	Contestant; season 5	
