= Mary Cosby =

American television personality (born 1972)

- Born: Mary Martha Jefferson; October 17, 1972 (age 54); Salt Lake City, Utah, U.S.
- Occupation: Television personality
- Known for: The Real Housewives of Salt Lake City
- Spouses: Dana Harris (div. 1998) Robert C. Cosby (m. 1998)
- Children: 1

Mary Martha Cosby (née Jefferson, formerly Harris; born October 17, 1972) is an American television personality. She is best known as an original cast member of the Bravo reality television series The Real Housewives of Salt Lake City.

== Early life and career ==
Mary Martha Cosby was born in Salt Lake City, Utah, and is the youngest of her siblings. Her father was originally from Milwaukee, Wisconsin. Her grandmother, Rosemary "Mama" Cosby, founded Faith Temple Pentecostal Church in 1968.

In September 2020, Cosby was announced as a cast member of The Real Housewives of Salt Lake City. Noah Samton, an executive at NBCUniversal, stated that the show was conceived after they discovered Cosby, and eventually found other personalities for a full The Real Housewives installment in Salt Lake City. However, having missed the second season's reunion special, she did not return for the show's third season. She later returned as a friend of the show in its fourth season and was promoted back to a full-time cast member in the fifth season.

== Personal life ==
Cosby married Dana Harris, but they divorced in September 1998. Following her grandmother Rosemary Cosby's death in January 1997, Cosby married Bishop Robert C. Cosby, her step-grandfather, in September 1998; they have one son, Robert Jr. Cosby has described her marriage as an "arranged marriage" and has stated, "It was kind of in my grandma's will for us to marry." Through her marriage, she became the First Lady of Faith Temple Pentecostal Church in Salt Lake City. The marriage exacerbated existing controversy between Robert and Rosemary's children from a previous marriage—specifically Rosalind Cazares, Mary's mother—over the division of Rosemary's assets, which included a printing company, day care, beauty salon, record store, and Gospel radio station. Because of the marriage, Cosby was estranged from her mother, who died in January 2025.

In September 2024, Cosby sued two executives of United Security Financial, accusing them of embezzlement.

On February 23, 2026, Cosby's son, Robert Cosby Jr., died at the age of 23.

=== Controversies ===
Cosby has been the subject of allegations that Faith Temple Pentecostal Church is a cult, particularly from former church members and several of her fellow The Real Housewives of Salt Lake City cast members. She has denied the allegations, calling them "false" and "ridiculous". The allegations were the subject of a three-part TLC docuseries, titled The Cult of the Real Housewife.

In April 2021, she was charged with unlawfully providing shelter to a runaway and contributing to the delinquency of a minor. She pled not guilty to the charges in August 2021, and the charges were dropped in September 2022.
