= Angie Katsanevas =

American television personality and businesswoman (born 1973)

- Katsanevas in 2026
- Born: Angie Katsanevas; November 17, 1973 (age 52); Salt Lake City, Utah, U.S.
- Occupations: Television personality; entrepreneur
- Known for: The Real Housewives of Salt Lake City
- Spouse: Shawn Trujillo (m. 1999; sep. 2026)
- Children: 1

Angie Katsanevas (born November 17, 1973) is an American reality television personality and businesswoman. She is best known as a cast member of the Bravo reality television series The Real Housewives of Salt Lake City, in which she has starred since 2023.

== Early life ==
Katsanevas was born in Salt Lake City to Louis and Georgia Katsanevas, Greek immigrants from Chania, Crete. She has six siblings. Her mother died in 1982. She attended the same high school as her The Real Housewives of Salt Lake City costar Heather Gay.

== Career ==
Katsanevas co-founded her hair salon "Lunatic Fringe" with her husband Shawn Trujillo in 1999. It later expanded into several salon locations, a beauty school, and a beauty supply store. In 2022, she joined The Real Housewives of Salt Lake City in its third season as a "friend of the housewives;" she was later upgraded to a full-time cast member in the series' fourth season. In November 2023, she participated in the BravoCon fan convention with her The Real Housewives castmates.

=== Awards and recognition ===
Katsanevas and her husband received the North American Hairstyling Awards (NAHA) Salon MBA award in 2010. Their salon business, Lunatic Fringe, later won NAHA's Salon Team of the Year award.

== Personal life ==
Katsanevas is Greek Orthodox. She married Shawn Trujillo in 1999. They have one daughter. The couple separated in 2026.

== Filmography ==
| Year | Title | Notes | Ref. |
|---|---|---|---|
| 2021–present | The Real Housewives of Salt Lake City | Main cast (season 4–present); recurring (season 3), guest (season 2) | |
| 2023–2025 | Watch What Happens Live with Andy Cohen | Guest; 4 episodes | |
| 2025 | Wife Swap: The Real Housewives Edition | Episode: "Overdressed and Underprepared" | |
