= Lisa Barlow =

American television personality (born 1974)

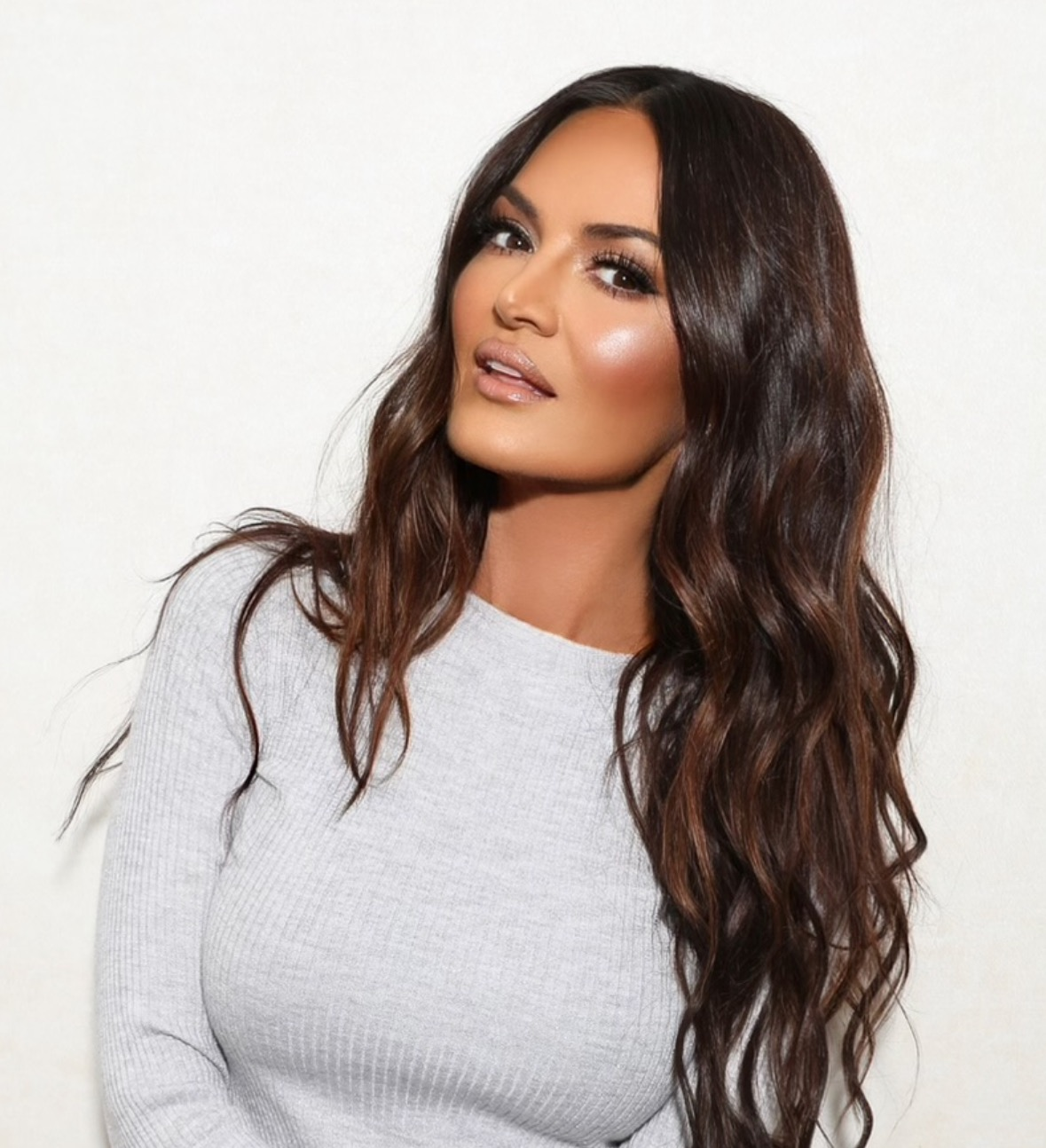
- Barlow in 2023
- Born: December 14, 1974 (age 51); New York, U.S.
- Education: Brigham Young University; University at Albany, SUNY
- Occupations: Businesswoman; television personality
- Years active: 2007–present
- Known for: The Real Housewives of Salt Lake City
- Spouse: John Barlow (m. 2003)
- Children: 2
- Website: reallisabarlow.com

Lisa Barlow (née Lee; born December 14, 1974) is an American businesswoman and television personality. Barlow is best known as a cast member of the reality television series The Real Housewives of Salt Lake City.

== Early life and career ==
Barlow was born on December 14, 1974, in Upstate New York. One of six children, she is primarily of Jewish heritage. She and her family converted to Mormonism in her youth. She graduated from Schalmont High School in Rotterdam, New York. She then went on to attend Brigham Young University for two years before transferring to the University at Albany, SUNY where she finished her degree.

In 2003, Lisa and John Barlow founded their tequila brand, Vida Tequila, which officially launched in 2007. The tequila itself is distilled and barrelled in Arandas, Jalisco, Mexico. In 2008, Lisa founded the marketing company, LUXE Marketing. Through LUXE, Barlow is thoroughly involved in the planning and producing of the Sundance Film Festival; having been dubbed 'The Queen of Sundance'. In 2019, Barlow founded her son's hair grooming company, Fresh Wolf, whose launch proceeds went to Utah Foster Care. Barlow co-founded the beauty brand, Nicole + Brizee, alongside Nikki and Brie Bella, having launched at the 2019 Sundance Film Festival; the brand was later sold in 2022. She's since had brand partnerships with Wendy's and Kérastase. In September 2026, Barlow collaborated with Wendy's to create 'Lisa Barlow's Baby Gorgeous Meal' available on the Wendy's app and Doordash. In addition to the meal were the Baby Gorgeous Sweepstakes, which gave customers the chance to win gift cards, merchandise or a $10,000 cash prize.

On September 10, 2020, Barlow was announced as a part of the inaugural cast for the Bravo network's reality series, The Real Housewives of Salt Lake City. She, along with Heather Gay, Whitney Rose, and Meredith Marks have remained main cast members since the shows inception. She guest starred on Bravo's Sold on SLC in 2024. In January 2026, Barlow competed in the Food Network's cooking competition series Worst Cooks in America for their thirtieth season, where she was eliminated second. The same month, Bravo announced Barlow as a part of the cast of Peacock's fifth season of Real Housewives Ultimate Girls Trip: Roaring 20th, alongside Teresa Giudice, Vicki Gunvalson, and Luann de Lesseps.

In June 2026, Barlow released her first music single, "Baby Gorgeous". In August, she announced her second single, "Echoes of You", set to be released in September, along with an EP. In October, Barlow, RHOSLC costar Meredith Marks, and Jed Jones released "Hypocrisy & Bullshit," a 37-second diss track aimed at their fellow RHOSLC cast members.

== Filmography ==
Year	Title	Role	Notes
2013	Shahs of Sunset	Herself	Cameo
2020–present	The Real Housewives of Salt Lake City	Herself	Main cast
2021	The Housewives of the North Pole	Lisa	Television Film
2024	Sold on SLC	Herself	Guest; 2 episodes
2026	Worst Cooks: Reality Check	Herself	Season 30 contestant; Eliminated second
2026	Below Deck Down Under	Herself	Guest; 3 episodes
2026	The Real Housewives Ultimate Girls Trip: Roaring 20th	Herself	Main cast (Season 5)

== Discography ==
Year	Title	Album
2026	BABY GORGEOUS	Non-album single

== Personal life ==
Lisa met John Barlow through her sister who served a LDS mission with John; they married on July 15, 2003. Together they have two children: Jack and Henry, and live in Draper, Utah.
