= Jen Shah =

American television personality (born 1973)

- Born: Jennifer Lui; October 4, 1973 (age 53); Provo, Utah, U.S.
- Education: University of Utah
- Occupations: Former television personality and entrepreneur
- Criminal charge: Conspiracy to commit wire fraud in connection with telemarketing
- Criminal status: Released December 10, 2025
- Spouse: Sharrieff Shah (m. 1994)
- Children: 2
- Website: dearjenshah.com

Jennifer Shah (née Lui; born October 4, 1973) is an American television personality best known for appearing on The Real Housewives of Salt Lake City for the first three seasons of the show.

In 2022, Shah pleaded guilty to charges related to a telemarketing scheme that targeted elderly and other individuals, resulting in a 78-month prison sentence. She was released in December 2025.

== Early life and education ==
Shah was born in Provo, Utah, and is of Hungarian, Italian, Irish, Chinese, Tongan, and Hawaiian descent. Her family lived in Hawaii for part of her childhood but relocated to Utah when she was the age of six. She is the cousin of filmmaker Tony Vainuku. She was originally raised in the Church of Jesus Christ of Latter-day Saints, but later converted to Islam after her husband expressed concerns about the Church's historical exclusion of Black members.

== Career ==
Shah worked for FranklinCovey before employment with finance company United Auto. In 2017, she would move to New York City and start her own companies, Red Steele and Mastery Pro Group.

In November 2020, Shah began appearing on Bravo's The Real Housewives of Salt Lake City. She remained a main cast member until the conclusion of its third season. In November 2022, Shah signed with CGEM Talent for agency representation. In 2020, she launched her fashion line JXA Fashion; however, it was no longer operational by January 2021. She also planned to launch beauty and false eyelashes businesses, Shah Beauty and Shah Lashes, but neither came into fruition.

After her December 2025 prison release, Shah gave her first sit-down interview with People Magazine in April 2026.

== Conviction and prison ==
In March 2021, while filming the series' second season, Shah was arrested and charged with conspiracy to commit wire fraud and money laundering in connection with a telemarketing scheme. The scam targeting elderly people and other individuals with services falsely marketed as business development tools, such as "website building and coaching". In April 2021, she entered a plea of not guilty to both charges. Her legal troubles were documented in the Hulu film Housewife and the Shah Shocker, which aired in November the same year.

In July 2022, one week before her trial was set to begin, Shah reversed her plea and pleaded guilty to conspiracy to commit wire fraud, saying in court, "From 2012 to March 2021, in the Southern District of New York and elsewhere, I agreed with others to commit wire fraud." As a part of her plea agreement, Shah agreed to pay $6.5 million of the $9.5 million in restitution.

In January 2023, Judge Sidney H. Stein sentenced Shah to 78 months (6½ years) in prison, which she began in February 2023. She served her sentence at a minimum security prison in Bryan, Texas, called Federal Prison Camp. Her sentence was reduced by one year and eight months in March 2023, October 2024, January and August 2025.

Shah was released from prison on December 10, 2025. Her release date was originally set for August 30, 2026.

Shah and Elizabeth Holmes became close friends through a shared cleaning penalty, Shah’s fitness classes, and personal conversations while serving overlapping sentences in Texas.

== Personal life ==
She met her husband, Sharrieff Shah, while they were students attending the University of Utah. They married in 1994 and have two sons together.
