= Whitney Rose (TV personality) =

American television personality and businesswoman (born 1986)

- Born: Whitney JoAnne Lesh; September 25, 1986 (age 40)
- Education: Saint Mary's College of California (BBA)
- Occupations: Television personality; entrepreneur
- Known for: The Real Housewives of Salt Lake City
- Spouses: Samuel Burgess (m. 2007, divorced) Justin Rose (m. 2009; sep. 2026)
- Children: 2
- Relatives: Heather Gay (third cousin)

Whitney JoAnne Rose (née Lesh; born September 25, 1986) is an American television personality and businesswoman. She is best known as an original cast member of the Bravo reality television series The Real Housewives of Salt Lake City, on which she has starred since 2020.

== Early life ==
Rose was born to Steve and Jolene Lesh. She has three half-siblings and is a third cousin of Heather Gay, her The Real Housewives of Salt Lake City costar. She is also a descendant of Shadrach Roundy, who worked as a bodyguard for Joseph Smith. She attended Saint Mary's College of California, graduating in 2016.

== Career ==
Before joining The Real Housewives of Salt Lake City, Rose worked at Nu Skin Enterprises, where she met her second husband, Justin Rose. She was also an account manager at InVision Communications, a direct sales company. She joined The Real Housewives of Salt Lake City after meeting with the show's producers in 2019. Initially, she and cousin Heather Gay did not know they were filming a The Real Housewives installment; they were only aware that they were filming a reality show about the "new Utah". In 2023, she was featured in the third season of The Real Housewives Ultimate Girls Trip.

She launched a skincare brand, Iris + Beau, in 2017; its name was later changed to Wild Rose Beauty. In 2024, she launched Sōl People, a social selling company. She also co-founded a jewelry company, Prism.

== Personal life ==
Rose grew up in the Church of Jesus Christ of Latter-day Saints. In 2007, she married Samuel Burgess, a basketball player for the BYU Cougars, at the Mount Timpanogos Utah Temple. They later divorced. In 2009, she married Justin Rose; they have two children. The couple separated in May 2026, and she filed for divorce in October 2026.

== Filmography ==
Year	Title	Notes	Ref.
2020–present	The Real Housewives of Salt Lake City	Main cast	
2020–2025	Watch What Happens Live with Andy Cohen	Guest; 18 episodes	
2023–2026	The Real Housewives Ultimate Girls Trip	Main cast; Season 3; Guest; Season 5	
2026	Below Deck Down Under	Guest; 3 episodes	
