= Meredith Marks =

American television personality and businesswoman (born 1971)

- Born: Meredith Rosenberg; December 15, 1971 (age 54)
- Education: Loyola University Chicago (BA); Northwestern University (JD, MM)
- Occupations: Television personality; entrepreneur
- Known for: The Real Housewives of Salt Lake City
- Spouse: Seth Marks (m. 1996)
- Children: 3

Meredith Marks (née Rosenberg; born December 15, 1971) is an American reality television personality and businesswoman. She is best known as an original cast member of the Bravo reality television series The Real Housewives of Salt Lake City, in which she has starred since 2020.

== Early life ==
Marks grew up in the Gold Coast neighborhood of Chicago, graduating from the Latin School of Chicago and Loyola University Chicago. She later attended graduate school at Northwestern University, where she earned degrees in both law and business; although she has a Juris Doctor degree, she has never practiced law.

== Career ==
After finishing graduate school, Marks started a Pilates studio that later turned into a full health club. She subsequently sold the health club to study jewelry at the Gemological Institute of America. She founded her eponymous jewelry brand in 2009, and later opened a boutique in Park City, Utah. She was cast in The Real Housewives of Salt Lake City after being contacted by a friend who was producing a reality show in Utah. Initially, Marks thought she was only being approached to provide ideas for the series. Prior to joining The Real Housewives, she had never seen an episode of the franchise.

In 2023, she launched a caviar brand, Meredith Marks Caviar, and launched a podcast with her husband titled Hanging by a Thread. She signed with Creative Artists Agency in February 2024. In May 2025, she made her DJ debut at All Out Music Festival. Later that year, she launched a party game titled Rumors and Nastiness and embarked on a 10-city DJ tour. She launched a line of bath bombs in November 2025.

=== Activism ===
Marks is a supporter of LGBTQ rights, having been named a GLAAD ambassador in September 2025. She has twice been on the host committee of the GLAAD Awards and was also on the host committee of GLAAD's 40th Anniversary Gala, held in October 2025.

== Personal life ==
Marks is Jewish. Regarding her faith, she has stated, "I’m very proud to be Jewish, but I'm not highly religious." She had her bat mitzvah ceremony in 2024.

She married Seth Marks in 1996. They have three children: Reid, Brooks, and Chloe. Her son Brooks is a cast member of the Bravo reality television series Next Gen NYC. She and her family moved to Utah in 2013 after her husband took a job at Overstock.com in Salt Lake City. Her husband filed for divorce in August 2019, but withdrew his petition four months later, in December 2019.

== Filmography ==
Year	Title	Notes	Ref.
2020–present	The Real Housewives of Salt Lake City	Main cast	
2020–2025	Watch What Happens Live with Andy Cohen	Guest; 18 episodes	
2023	The Real Friends of WeHo	Guest; 1 episode	
2023	The Real Housewives of New York City	Guest; 1 episode	
2024	The Real Housewives of Orange County	Guest; 1 episode	
2025	Next Gen NYC	5 episodes	
2026	Below Deck Down Under	Guest; 3 episodes; "The Real Housewives of Down Under"	
2026	The Real Housewives Ultimate Girls Trip	Guest; 1 episode	
