= Heather Gay =

American television personality (born 1974)

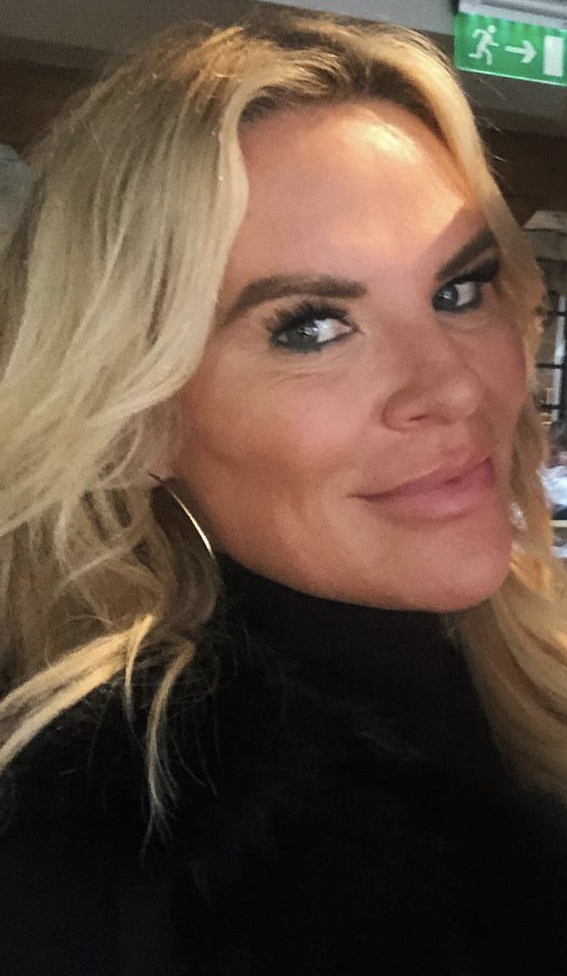
- Born: Heather Jill Deans; June 29, 1974 (age 52); Carmel-by-the-Sea, California, U.S.
- Education: Brigham Young University (BA)
- Occupations: Businesswoman; television personality; author
- Known for: The Real Housewives of Salt Lake City
- Spouse: Frank William Gay III (m. 2000; div. 2014)
- Children: 3
- Relatives: Whitney Rose (third cousin)

Heather Jill Gay (née Deans; born June 29, 1974) is an American television personality, businesswoman and author. She is best known for appearing as a main cast member on the reality television series, The Real Housewives of Salt Lake City, since the show's inception in 2020.

== Early life ==
Gay was born in Carmel-by-the-Sea, California, to parents Susan (née Carver) and John Deans; the third of six children. When Gay was five, her family relocated to Denver, Colorado. She graduated from Brigham Young University with a degree in Humanities. Gay was raised in the Church of Jesus Christ of Latter-day Saints but left the Church in 2019 due to its treatment of gay people and women.

== Career ==
In 2017, Gay and co-owner Andrea Robinson, founded and launched a medical spa services company, Beauty Lab + Laser, in Murray, Utah. Beauty Lab + Laser opened a second location in nearby Riverton in 2022.

Gay first gained notability after the premiere episode of the Bravo reality television series, The Real Housewives of Salt Lake City, in which she has starred since 2020. She has also been featured in the third season of The Real Housewives Ultimate Girls Trip, alongside co-star and cousin Whitney Rose. In late 2022, she made a guest appearance on Below Deck Adventure.

In February 2023, Gay published her book, Bad Mormon: A Memoir, which made The New York Times Best Seller list. She released her second book, Good Time Girl, in December of the following year. In March 2026, Heather announced her first horror fiction novel, Eternal Glow, is set to release on October 6, 2026, by publisher Podium Entertainment.

== Personal life ==
In July 2000, Gay married Frank William "Billy" Gay III at the Laie Hawaii Temple. Billy is the grandson of prominent business executive Frank William Gay and nephew of Robert C Gay, a general authority of the LDS Church and former CEO of Huntsman Gay Global Capital (HGGC).

The couple separated after 11 years of marriage, but their divorce was not finalized until 2014.

== Filmography ==
| Year | Title | Role | Notes |
|---|---|---|---|
| 2020–present | The Real Housewives of Salt Lake City | Herself | Reality show; main cast |
| 2020–present | Watch What Happens Live with Andy Cohen | Herself | Guest; 14 episodes |
| 2022 | The Wendy Williams Show | Herself | Talk show |
| 2022 | Below Deck Adventure | Herself | Guest |
| 2023 | Sherri | Herself | Talk show |
| 2023, 2026 | The Real Housewives Ultimate Girls Trip | Herself | Main cast; Season 3; Guest; Season 5 |
| 2025 | Surviving Mormonism with Heather Gay | Herself | Limited series; 3 episodes |

== Bibliography ==
- Bad Mormon: A Memoir (2023) ISBN 978-1982199531
- Good Time Girl (2024) ISBN 978-1668049808
