= Reagan Charleston =

American jewelry designer, lawyer and reality television personality

Reagan Charleston Esq.
- Born: 1988 (age 37–38); New Orleans, Louisiana
- Education: Loyola University New Orleans College of Law
- Occupations: Television personality, jewelry designer, attorney
- Board member of: All Access Sideline Pass, Canal Place Style Board
- Spouses: Jeff Charleston (m. 2012; div. 2018) Reece Thomas (m. 2018)
- Children: 2

Reagan Charleston (née Tucker) (born 1988) is an American jewelry designer, lawyer and reality television personality known for appearing on Southern Charm New Orleans.

== Early life and education ==
Reagan Tucker was born and raised in Mandeville, Louisiana, and is of Louisiana Creole descent. She is a descendant of Mary Peychaud, a member of the family which created Peychaud's Bitters and who is credited with creating the Sazerac cocktail.

Charleston's grandparents and mother were copper sculpture artists and owned an art gallery in the French Quarter. She has stated that her family background in art inspired her to become a jewelry designer.

In 2015, she began attending Loyola University New Orleans College of Law, and graduated on May 12, 2018.

== Career ==
=== Jewelry design ===
Charleston founded Reagan Charleston Design, a jewelry and fashion accessory company, after returning from a trip to Florence, Italy in 2012. She grew up in her Grandparents art galleries and studios in the French Quarter of New Orleans, where her mother and grandparents made copper sculptures. She works with her sister, Reina, and mother, Lauren, both artists and metalsmiths. Her designs take inspiration from the culture of New Orleans, as well as European history and architecture, especially Italian, French and Croatian culture. On October 18, 2018 she opened a jewelry shop called Reagan Charleston Jewelry in One Canal Place. In October 2021, she debuted a collaborative collection with Eugenia Kim with her jewelry adorning the Eugenia Kim hats.

=== Southern Charm New Orleans ===
Reagan and Jeff Charleston became cast members of the reality television series Southern Charm New Orleans in 2017. Reagan Charleston had previously lived in Charleston, South Carolina and was a friend of Whitney Sudler-Smith, the executive producer of Southern Charm. Both Reagan and Jeff reprised their roles in season 2 of Southern Charm New Orleans.

She was also Grand Marshall for the 2020 Krewe of Pandora in the Jefferson Parish Mardi Gras parade.

=== Legal career ===
Charleston graduated magna cum laude from Loyola Law School in 2018. While in law school, she was a member of the Loyola Law Review and the Phi Delta Phi Honor Society. Her case note, Hoffman v. 21st Century North American Insurance Company: Abrogation of the Collateral Source Rule?, was published in the Loyola Law Review. Her comment, Thumbs Down: The Trouble with Compelled Finger Print Access to Smart Devices, was published in the Loyola Law Review Online and later cited in the Federal Magistrate Judges Association Bulletin. She was also named a William S. Crowe Scholar and received the J. Skelly Wright Award in 2016 for oral advocacy.

From 2017 to 2018, Charleston served as Executive Law Clerk for the Louisiana Solicitor General. In 2022, she joined the law firm Aylstock, Witkin, Kreis & Overholtz, where her practice has focused on mass tort and complex civil litigation.

Charleston was appointed by Judge Carolyn Kuhl to the Plaintiffs Steering Committee in the Social Media Addiction Judicial Council Coordinated Proceeding (JCCP) in California, the state counterpart to the federal multidistrict litigation (MDL). In this role, she represents children and adolescents alleging harm from the design of platforms operated by Meta, Google, Snap, and TikTok. She also serves on the third-party discovery committee for both the MDL and JCCP.

Her practice also includes representing survivors of childhood sexual abuse and victims of cryptocurrency fraud in civil court. She has worked on litigation involving defective drugs and medical devices as well. In recognition of her work on behalf of crime victims, Charleston was appointed to the Advisory Board of the National Crime Victims Bar Association. In 2025, Charleston was included on the Lawdragon 500 X – The Next Generation list.

Charleston has provided legal commentary to national media outlets including Fox News, Fox News Radio, and OutKick, primarily on issues related to social media litigation and victim rights.

Charleston is also the co-founder of DivorcePlus.com, a national platform for on-demand family law services. In addition to her legal work, Charleston has served for over a decade on the board of Sideline Pass, a nonprofit organization supporting young women in Louisiana and the Gulf Coast region.

== Personal life ==
Reagan married Jeff Charleston in 2012. The couple separated in 2018, and later divorced.

In December 2018 she married Reece Thomas. She decided to keep the last name Charleston because it was on all her professional documents and business Their daughter Reece Ellis Thomas was born on June 12, 2019. Their son Rexford Vance Thomas was born August 23, 2021.

Reece and Reagan separated in December 2023
