= Charlotte Latin School =

Private school in Charlotte, North Carolina, US

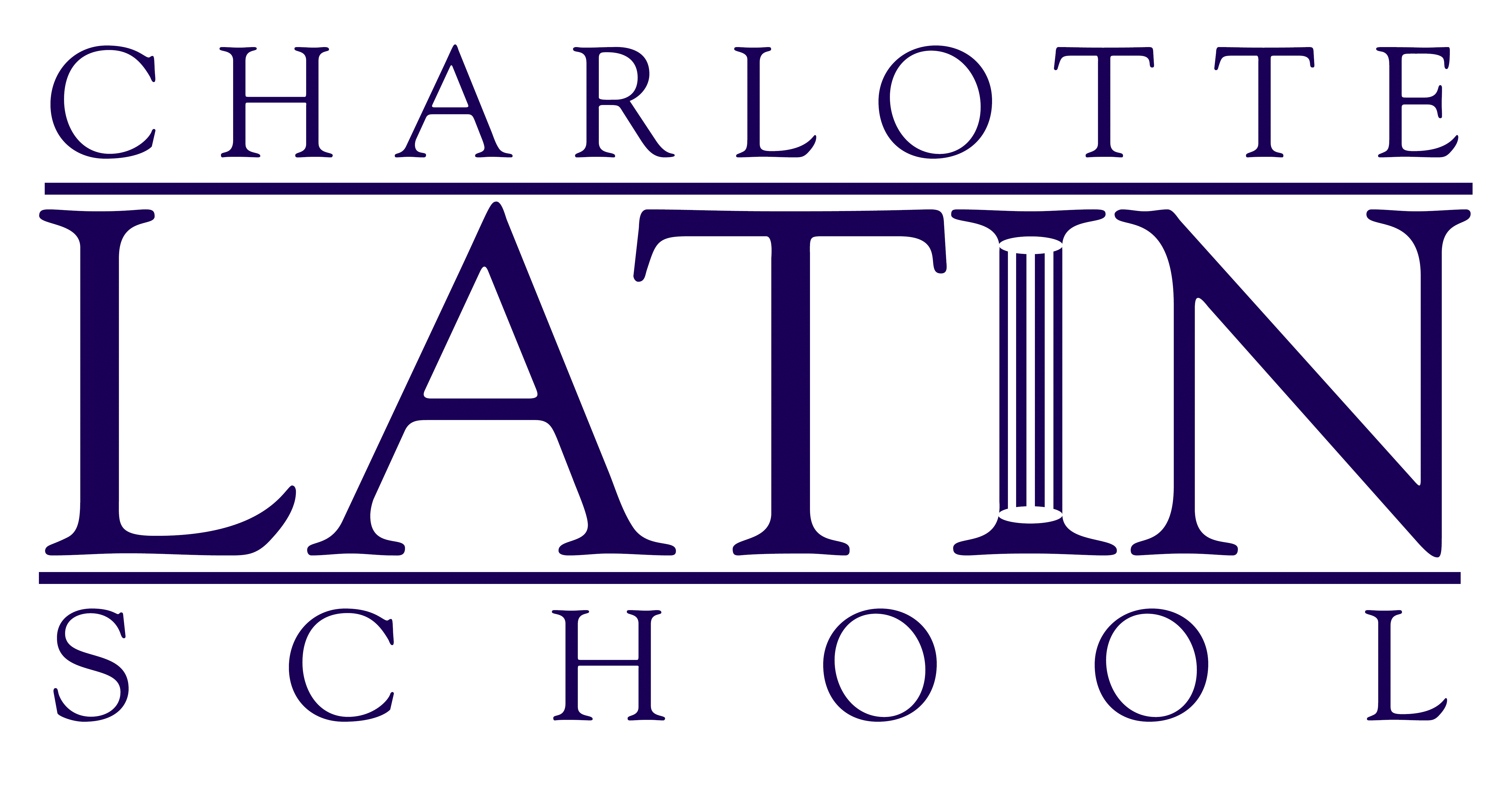

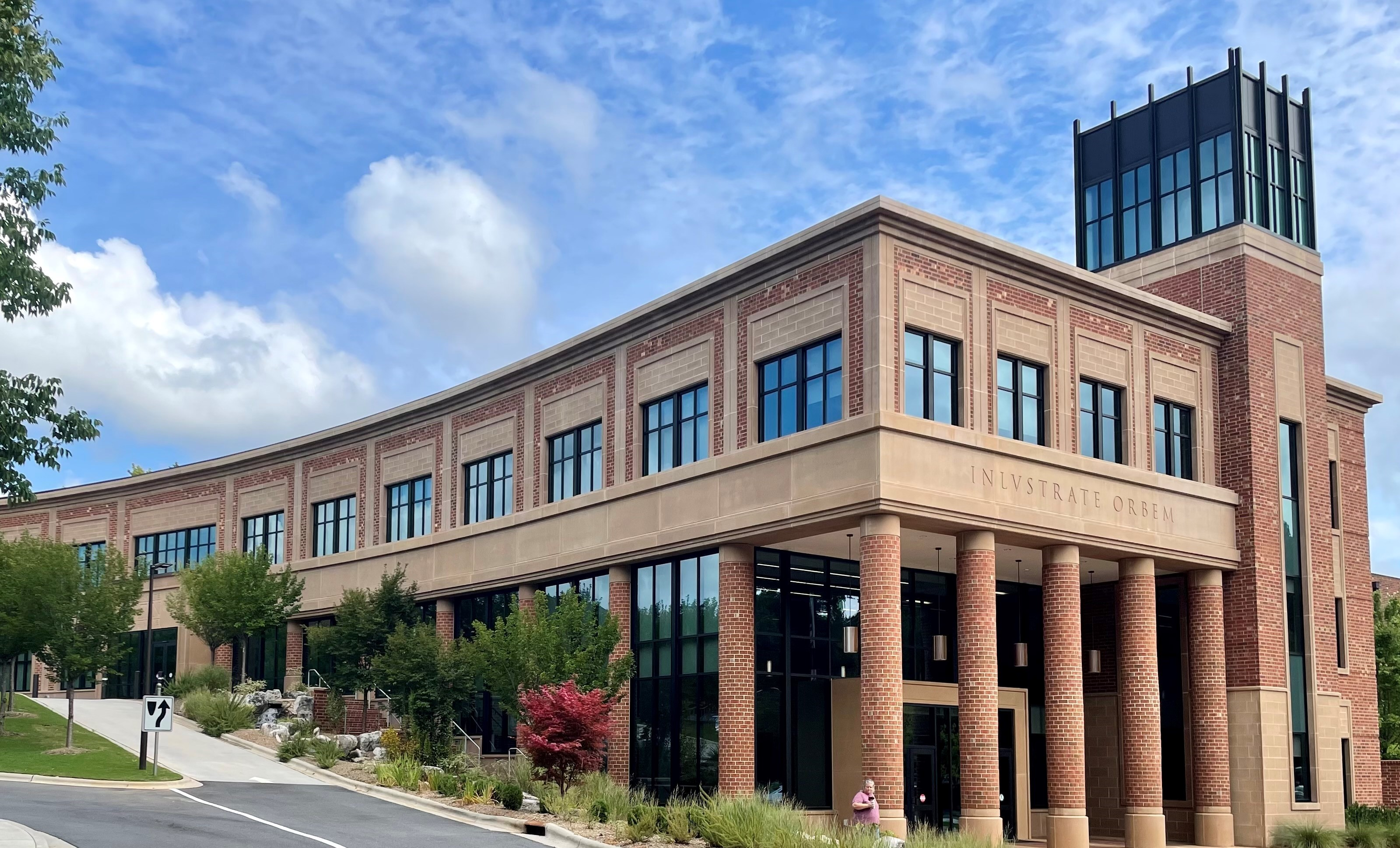
- The Inlustrate Orbem ("Enlighten the World") Building, opened in 2019

Location
- 9502 Providence Road; Charlotte, North Carolina 28277; United States; 35°04′47″N 80°46′27″W

Information
- Type: Private; Independent; college preparatory; day school
- Motto: Inlustrate Orbem
- Religious affiliation: Nonsectarian
- Established: 1970 (56 years ago)
- CEEB code: 340663
- Headmaster: Charles (Chuck) Baldecchi
- Faculty: 183.1
- Grades: Pre-Kindergarten–12
- Gender: Co-educational
- Enrollment: 1,560 (2022)
- Campus type: Suburban
- Colors: Navy and white
- Athletics: North Carolina Independent Schools Athletic Association (NCISAA)
- Athletics conference: Charlotte Independent School Athletic Association (CISAA)
- Sports: 66 teams (including middle school)
- Mascot: Hawk
- Nickname: Hawks
- Rival: Charlotte Country Day School, Providence Day School
- Accreditation: SACS, SAIS, NDPI, Blue Ribbon (1987|1997|2000)
- Tuition: $23,750–$32,900 (2024–2025)
- Website: www.charlottelatin.org

Charlotte Latin School is an K–12 independent, coeducational, non-sectarian day school located in Charlotte, North Carolina, United States. The school was founded in 1970 and serves about 1,500 students in transitional kindergarten through 12th grade. The school is accredited by the Southern Association of Colleges and Schools, Southern Association of Independent Schools and the North Carolina Department of Public Instruction.

== History ==
Development of Charlotte Latin School began in 1967, when a group of Charlotte citizens led by businessman Frank Thies undertook the planning of an independent, college preparatory school that would focus on traditional teaching methods and classical curriculum. The founders believed that the growing Charlotte area needed another school of the caliber of Charlotte Country Day School, which was at capacity and had a waiting list at the time. The founding group incorporated under the name Charlotte Latin School with a 13-member board of trustees: Carol Belk, Patrick Calhoun, Tom Creasy, Jr., Alan Dickson, Cam Faison, Catherine Faison, Betsy Knight, Bob Knight, John Pender, Howard Pitt, John Stedman and Janet Thies. The Latin name was chosen as a reference to the Boston Latin School, a New England school considered one of the best in the country that placed a strong emphasis on a traditional liberal arts education.

In early 1970 the trustees mailed out 2,000 brochures to gauge community interest in the new school. After receiving adequate response the trustees secured approximately 50 acres of land near the intersection of Providence Road and Highway 51 in suburban Charlotte. Two buildings were constructed on the new Charlotte Latin campus in the summer of 1970. An advertisement seeking new faculty members yielded 200 applicants for 25 open positions.

Charlotte Latin opened for its first school year in the fall of 1970 with 425 students in grades one through nine and Jeremiah Splaine as the first headmaster. In October 1970 a standard review by the Internal Revenue Service granted the school tax-exempt status after it printed its non-discrimination policy in the local newspaper.

Over the ensuing three years, the school added 10th, 11th, and 12th grade classes. By the end of 1975 enrollment had grown to 812 students with 60 faculty and the school was accredited by the Southern Association of Colleges and Schools. Many independent schools in the Charlotte area experienced rapid growth in the early 1970s as a result of the controversy around busing in the Charlotte Mecklenburg School system. While Charlotte Latin had been in the planning stage for several years prior and was not founded in response to desegregation, journalists at the time found it likely that a portion of its early growth was attributable to parents seeking to avoid busing in the public school system. One member of a local anti-busing group enrolled his children in the school, stating "I've simply taken my children off the battlefield while I fight the battle."

Both the founders and administration expressed non-discriminatory views early in the school's history. Founding board member Frank Thies told The Charlotte Observer that Charlotte Latin would not exclude anyone based on race and that its formation was not connected to desegregation of the public schools: "We've been working on this school...for three years. If we wanted to create a segregation academy, we could open tomorrow with all the money and students we could take." Headmaster Jeremiah Splaine told The Charlotte News that the school has an open door policy and "is interested only in providing education" and to meet the area's need for "a great independent school." While the student body was primarily white, records indicate Charlotte Latin was desegregated from its inception, with African American students enrolled in the early 1970s.

Dr. Edward J. Fox, Jr. was named Charlotte Latin's 3rd headmaster in 1976. Over his 25-year tenure, the school experienced a period of sustained growth, with enrollment increasing to 1,320 students, the size of the campus increasing from 50 acres to 112 acres, and the addition of several new facilities. In 2000 the school's 30,000-square-foot Science, Art, and Technology Building was opened, followed by the 45,000-square-foot Beck Student Activities Center a year later. The middle school building was named the "Edward J. Fox, Jr. Middle School" upon his retirement in 2001.

In 2001, Dr. Fox was succeeded as headmaster by Arch McIntosh, Jr. Under McIntosh's leadership, minority enrollment at Charlotte Latin increased more than four-fold, from 3.4% of the student population in 2000 to 15.6% in 2018. At the end of his 18-year tenure, Charlotte Latin opened the Inlustrate Orbem Building, a 50,000-square-foot facility housing upper school classrooms as well as the admissions, college counseling and development offices. The 100/200 building (formerly classrooms and administrative offices) was repurposed as the "McIntosh Leadership Center" in 2018, shortly before his retirement.

In July 2019 Charles D. Baldecchi ("Chuck") became the 5th head of school in Charlotte Latin's history.

== Academics ==
=== Awards and recognition ===
During the 1976–1977 school year, Charlotte Latin was awarded a charter to the Cum Laude Society, an organization that honors scholastic achievement at secondary institutions. Charlotte Latin is the youngest school in the United States to have received a Cum Laude Society charter.

Charlotte Latin has been recognized with the Blue Ribbon School of Excellence Award from the United States Department of Education on three different occasions. The Upper School was recognized in 1986–87, the Lower School in 1996-97 and the Middle School in 1999–2000.

Sponsored by the Dr. John C. Malone Family Foundation, the Malone Scholars program endows scholarships for highly capable students in grades 7 through 12 based on merit and financial need. Charlotte Latin is one of fifty Malone Scholars schools in the country, which are selected by the Malone Family Foundation for their: "academic caliber; the quality of their staff; excellent accommodations for gifted and talented students; strong AP/IB and enrichment programs; attention to the individual student's needs, interests, and talents; financial strength and stability; a commitment to financial aid; and an economically, culturally, ethically, and socially diverse population."

In 2020, PolarisList ranked Charlotte Latin first in the Mecklenburg area for sending students to elite colleges after a study conducted over the four-year period from 2015 to 2018 that measured enrollment at Harvard, Princeton, and MIT. Charlotte Latin ranked fifth in the state of North Carolina on this same measure, behind the North Carolina School of Science and Mathematics, Durham Academy, East Chapel Hill High School, and Cary Academy.

=== STEAM ===
Charlotte Latin focuses its scientific curriculum on STEAM, incorporating the arts and humanities into its scientific, technology, engineering and math training. In 2016 the school was designated a Fab Lab and began participating in the Fab Academy program. Founded at the Massachusetts Institute of Technology, the Fab Lab focuses on using engineering and digital fabrication to solve real world problems through use of many different tools provided. Said tools include 3D printers, laser cutters, CNC machines, a SawStop table-saw, and computers. Digital design programs in use in the CLS Fab Lab include Fusion360, Cameo Silhouette Studio, the Adobe suite, KiCad, and CorelDRAW. In March 2020, a student-led campaign supervised by Fab Lab director and Charlotte Latin teacher Tom Dubick raised in excess of $100,000 and utilized the school's facility to design and print 3D and injection molded face shields for medical professionals in need of PPE during the COVID-19 pandemic.

== Campus and facilities ==
Charlotte Latin's campus occupies 128 contiguous acres in suburban Charlotte, North Carolina. The lower, middle, and upper schools are all contained on a single campus and share many common facilities. Structures of note include:

- Fennebresque Hall (constructed in 1970) – Original upper school building today houses administrative and business offices. Named in honor of long-time Board Chairman John C. Fennebresque, Sr. in 1995.
- Claudette B. Hall Lower School (1970, expanded in 1993 and 2010) – Original lower school building named in honor of former lower school head Claudette B. Hall upon her retirement in 2003.
- Belk Gymnasium (1973) – Original gymnasium, today used primarily for middle school sports.
- McIntosh Leadership Center (1973) – Originally known as the "100/200" building. Re-purposed and renamed in honor of former head of school Arch McIntosh in 2018.
- Founders Hall (1973) – Original library, today the school dining hall.
- Edward J. Fox Middle School (1978, expanded in 1993) – Named in honor of Headmaster Emeritus Dr. Edward J. Fox in 2000.
- Patten Stadium (1974) – Natural grass soccer and football field and outdoor track. Named in honor of longtime football coach and Dean of Students Robert A. Patten, Jr. in 1989.
- Thies Auditorium (1985) – 750-seat auditorium, named in honor of founding trustee Frank Thies.
- SwimMAC (1990) – Olympic sized indoor pool and training facilities. Owned and operated by SwimMAC Carolina, co-located on Charlotte Latin campus.
- Knight-Dickson Library (1993) – Named in honor of founding trustees Bob Knight and Alan Dickson in 2018.
- Science, Art & Technology Building (2000) – 30,000 sf facility housing the Charlotte Latin STEAM programs.
- Beck Student Activities Center (2001) – 45,000 sf facility housing the basketball gymnasium, indoor track, wrestling room, coaches offices, locker rooms, and training facilities.
- Shelton Hall (2010) – Lower school dining and gathering space.
- The Nest (2010) – On-site child care and enrichment program for faculty children.
- Horne Performing Arts Center (2011) – 31,000 sf facility housing music classrooms, practice rooms, black box theater and visual arts gallery.
- Extended Day Building (2018)
- Inlustrate Orbem Building (2019) – 50,000 sf facility housing upper school classrooms as well as the admissions, marketing, college counseling and development offices.
- Valor Hall Gym (2027) - Multipurpose Gym adjacent to the Strength Center which houses Talons Events, Enrichment Programs, P.E, and Athletics Practices.
- Hawk Intensity Training Center (2027) - Indoor Training Facility on Levine Athletic Campus featuring pitching and hitting cages for baseball and softball, golf simulators, and turf space.
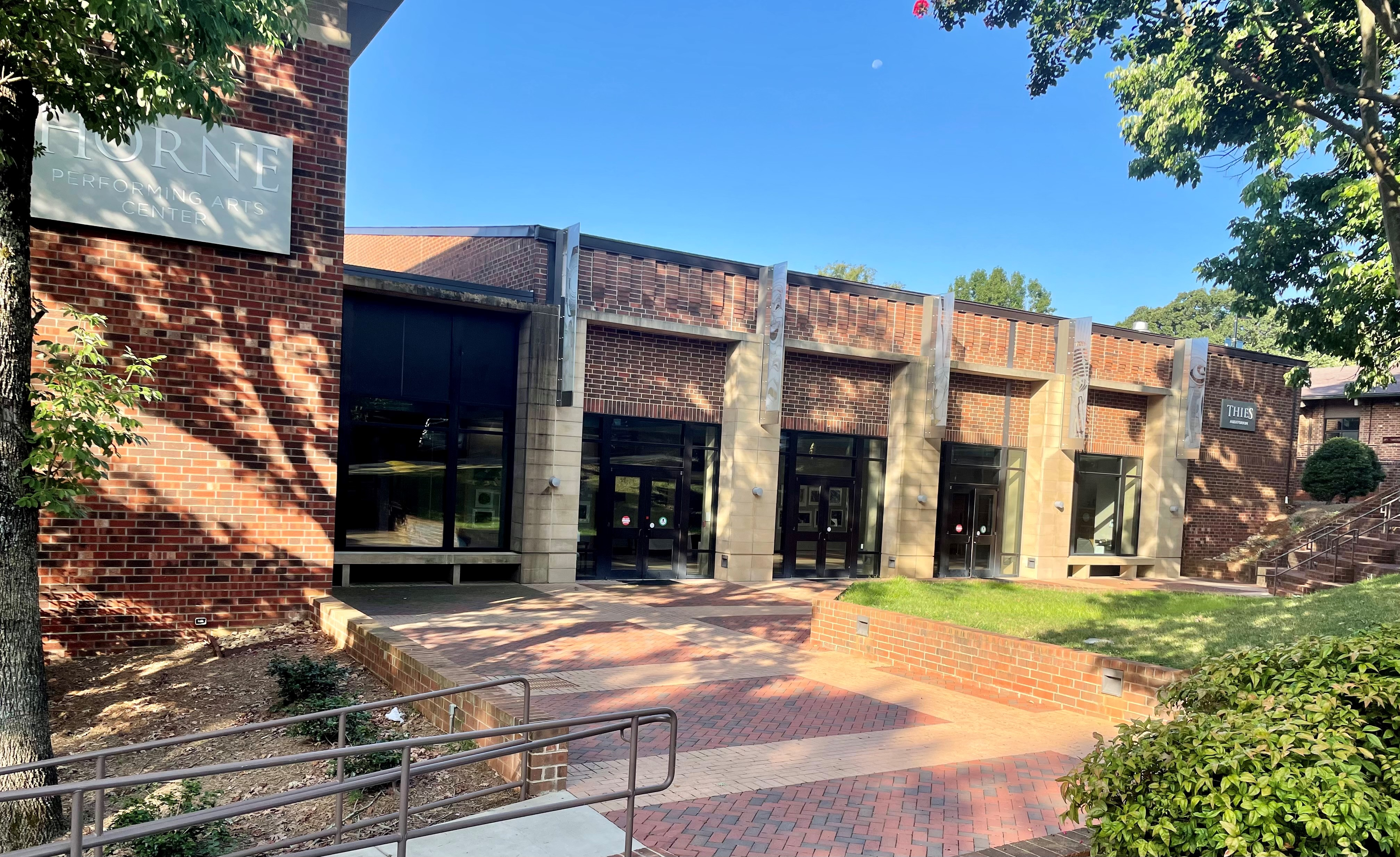
  The Horne Performing Arts Center and Thies Auditorium
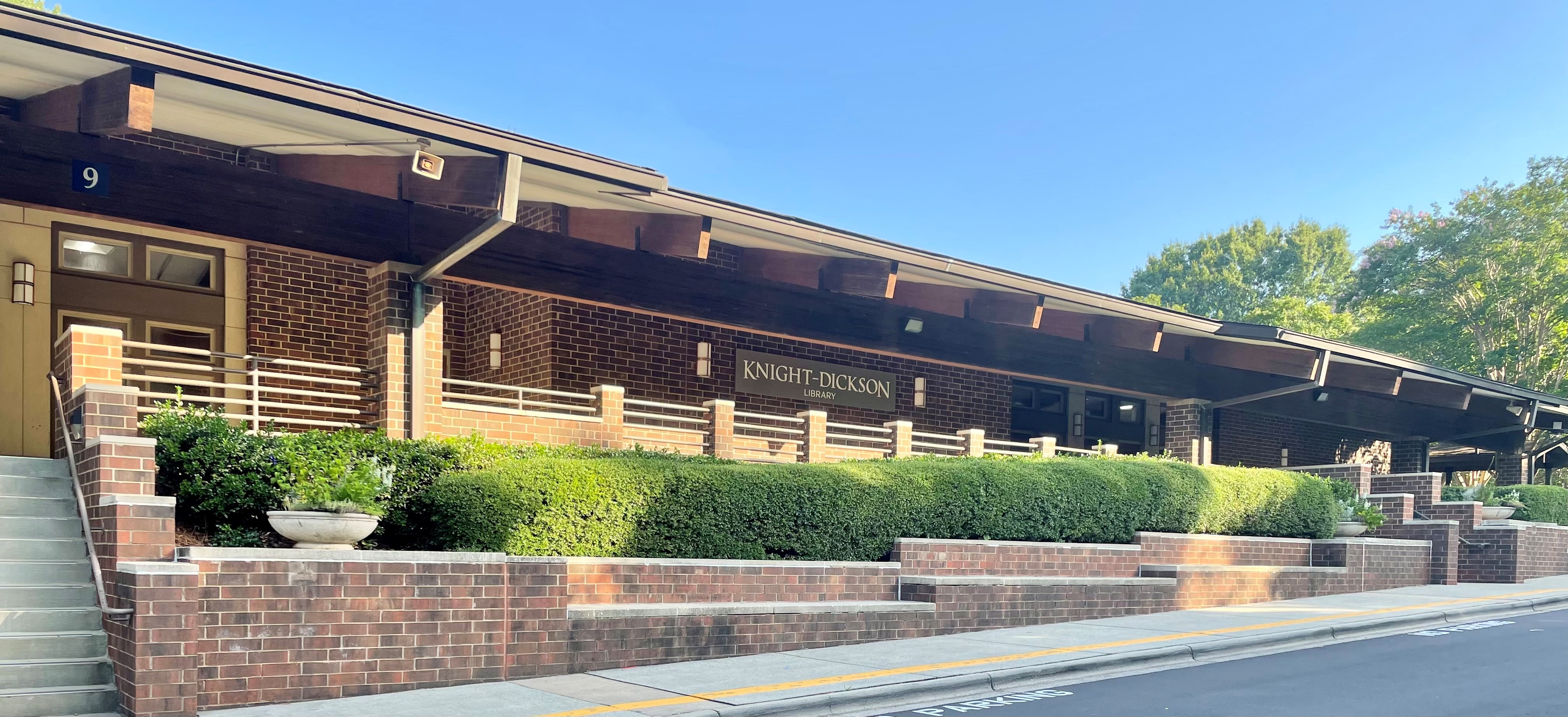
  The Knight-Dixon Library

== Athletics ==
Sports at Charlotte Latin School are available to all students in 7th to 12th grades. The athletics program supports 60 teams across the middle school, junior varsity and varsity levels, 23 of which are varsity sports. Historically, approximately 90% of the student body participates in at least one school sanctioned sport between 7th and 12th grades.

South Campus is the main location for almost all sporting activities at Latin. Its facilities include: five grass fields, a baseball field, a softball field, a turf field, six tennis courts, the Olympic-sized SwimMAC Carolina, and an expansive cross country trail. Other facilities spread throughout campus include: the Belk Gym, the SAC, Carol Hall; a 1,450 seat stadium with a track; an indoor track; a wrestling room; and a strength center.

Currently planned sporting facilities include:

- A new practice basketball gym near the Strength Center
- Two new artificial turf fields in South Campus
- Additional stadium lighting for the current main artificial turf field in South Campus

The school competes in the North Carolina Independent Schools Athletic Association (NCISAA). Locally, teams compete in the Charlotte Independent School Athletic Association (CISAA) and Greater Charlotte Middle School Athletic Association (GCMSAA).

The NCISAA Wells Fargo Cup (formerly the Wachovia Cup) is awarded annually to the independent North Carolina school with the best overall interscholastic sports programs. The competition includes all varsity sports for the school year, with points awarded to the schools that finish in the top eight of each state championship tournament. Charlotte Latin won its first Wells Fargo Cup in 1984 and has won the award a total of 17 times, most recently in 2019.

Charlotte Latin has won a total of 165 state championships across 21 men's and women's sports programs since the inception of the NCISAA in 1973:

Charlotte Latin School NCISAA Varsity Championships
Sport	Titles	Year
Wrestling	23	1984, 1987, 1988, 1989, 1990, 1991, 1997, 1998, 2003, 2004, 2005, 2010, 2012, 2013, 2014, 2015, 2016, 2017, 2018, 2019, 2020, 2021, 2023
Boys Tennis	13	1974, 1976, 1977, 1978, 1979, 1980, 1982, 1983, 1984, 1985, 1986, 1988, 1993
Girls Tennis	13	1978, 1979, 1980, 1981, 1982, 1983, 1984, 1985, 1986, 1988, 1989, 2005, 2020
Boys Swimming	16	1990, 1991, 1992, 1993, 2006, 2007, 2013, 2014, 2015, 2016, 2017, 2018, 2020, 2021, 2022, 2023
Football	12	1987, 1989, 1990, 1996, 1999, 2003, 2005, 2006, 2007, 2009, 2016, 2017
Volleyball	11	1989, 1995, 1997, 2005, 2006, 2007, 2008, 2009, 2010, 2011, 2012
Girls Soccer	11	1989, 1993, 2008, 2009, 2010, 2011, 2015, 2016, 2017, 2018, 2023
Girls Swimming	10	1983, 1984, 1985, 1986, 1987, 1988, 1989, 1990, 1991, 1992
Girls Track	9	1989, 1990, 1991, 2006, 2007, 2008, 2009, 2010, 2011
Field Hockey	8	1991, 1992, 2010, 2011, 2015, 2016, 2017, 2018
Boys Track	7	1978, 1979, 1983, 1991, 2008, 2010, 2011
Boys Soccer	7	1987, 1989, 1990, 1992, 2003, 2004, 2008
Baseball	5	1989, 1990, 1994, 1995, 2001
Boys Basketball	5	1991, 1993, 1994, 2003, 2004
Girls Basketball	5	1984, 1985, 1991, 1995, 1997
Boys Lacrosse	5	2005, 2012, 2013, 2014, 2015
Girls' Lacrosse	4	2019, 2021, 2022, 2023
Women's XC	4	2007, 2008, 2009, 2010
Softball	3	1989, 1991, 1996
Dance	3	2012, 2013, 2014
Men's Golf	3	1982, 1994, 2023
Mens XC	1	1979

== Notable alumni ==
- Brenton Bersin (2008), NFL wide receiver
- Chris Canty (2001), NFL defensive end
- Michael Chadwick (2013), swimmer and USA National swim team member
- Ross Cockrell (2009), NFL cornerback
- Claudia Dickey, soccer goalkeeper
- Ian Eskelin, record producer, songwriter, and founding member and lead singer of All Star United
- A. J. Finn, crime fiction author and writer of The Woman in the Window
- Kathy Guadagnino, professional golfer on the LPGA tour
- Juan Guzman, professional soccer player
- Daniel Jones, NFL quarterback
- Howard R. Levine, former CEO and CEO of Family Dollar
- Anthony Morrow (2004), NBA player
- Pender Murphy, former professional tennis player
- Jim Rash, actor, director and Academy Award-winning screenwriter
- Mia Sable, actress, voice over artist, and singer/songwriter
- Scott Turner Schofield, actor and writer
