= List of Southern Charm episodes =

Southern Charm is an American reality television series aired on Bravo that debuted on March 3, 2014. The series focuses on several socialites as they socialize and navigate their personal lives in Charleston, South Carolina.

== Series overview ==
Season	Episodes	Originally released	
Season	Episodes	First released	Last released
1	10	March 3, 2014	May 5, 2014
2	12	March 16, 2015	May 25, 2015
3	14	April 4, 2016	July 5, 2016
4	15	April 3, 2017	July 17, 2017
5	16	April 5, 2018	July 30, 2018
6	16	May 15, 2019	August 28, 2019
7	13	October 29, 2020	February 11, 2021
8	17	June 23, 2022	October 13, 2022
9	17	September 14, 2023	January 18, 2024
10	17	December 5, 2024	April 3, 2025
11	17	November 19, 2025	March 25, 2026
12	TBA	November 12, 2026	TBA

== Episodes ==
=== Season 1 (2014) ===
Craig Conover, Cameran Wimberly, Jenna King, Thomas Ravenel, Shep Rose, and Whitney Sudler-Smith are introduced as series regulars.

No. overall	No. in season	Title	Original release date	US viewers (millions)
1	1	"Peter Pan 'Sin'Drome"	March 3, 2014	0.98
We meet our 6th generation (at least) Southern Charmers in all of their glory as they hit on women, roll their eyes at the guys who hit on women, drink profusely, and generally exercise bad judgment.
2	2	"Sh-epic Fail!"	March 10, 2014	0.72
Thomas' search for a wife continues when he takes out a woman more age appropriate and thinks she could be the one...until she questions his felony past. Shep winds up breaking the bro code with Craig when a few cocktails lead to questionable decisions.
3	3	"In the Cups"	March 17, 2014	0.74
Thomas brushes up on his French to take one more swing with Dani at a local French restaurant. Shep sits down with an old girlfriend to discuss the future of his rapscallion lifestyle. Jenna hosts a pool party to welcome folks to her new house south of Broad. Kathryn shows up with Whitney and drops a bomb on Thomas.
4	4	"Is She or Isn't She?"	March 24, 2014	0.92
Is Kathryn pregnant? Is it Shep's or Thomas' baby? What should we wear to a white tie Carolina Day party? Tough questions. Fun times.
5	5	"White Ties and White Lies"	March 31, 2014	0.92
Carolina Day is celebrated with a glamorous white tie party. Thomas decides to bring Kathryn as his official date, Whitney brings his assistant, Jenna and Cameran come together, Shep surprisingly doesn't bring MJ, and someone is threatened to be "bitch slapped."
6	6	"The Glass Menagerie is Half Full"	April 7, 2014	1.06
Thomas, wanting to make sure his friends don't make the same mistakes he has made, hosts a dinner to share with them his thoughts on their lives. Is there someone better to give people advice on relationships? Most certainly!
7	7	"The Third Man"	April 14, 2014	1.08
The crew escapes to Shep's family plantation for a pig hunt followed by a pig roast. They shoot guns, they meet the Boykin family historian, and Whitney reveals a disturbing secret to Thomas.
8	8	"One of the Lost Boys Leaves Neverland"	April 21, 2014	1.21
It's July 4th and independence is on the mind. First for Whitney who shows off his new apartment away from Mom, second for Shep who makes sure that all of the women he’s sleeping with attend Whitney's party, and third for Thomas -- fireworks fly and as one chapter ends and a brand new one begins.
9	9	"Reunion"	April 28, 2014	0.86
The cast comes together for the first time to reveal what’s new in their lives and to discuss some of the most-talked about moments this season. Plus, the relationship rollercoaster between Kathryn and Thomas takes center stage as the two reveal the current status of their love life. Andy Cohen hosts the Charleston crew as they chat about the highs and lows of the season.
10	10	"Secrets Revealed"	May 5, 2014	1.04
This hourlong special takes a look back at lost footage from Season 1 with never-before-seen cast interviews. From a fun weekend booze cruise and spooky sleepovers at Jenna’s house, to the ultimate introduction of the season…adorable baby Kensington!

=== Season 2 (2015) ===
King departed as a series regular. Kathryn Calhoun Dennis and Landon Clements are introduced as series regulars.

No. overall	No. in season	Title	Original release date	US viewers (millions)
11	1	"Return To Neverland"	March 16, 2015	0.87
Why have one christening when you can have two? Kathryn and Thomas must plan a second christening of their daughter, Kensington Calhoun Ravenel, because the first godmother might have gotten a little too frisky with Thomas for Kathryn's liking and a new godmother has been chosen. Shep invites an old friend, Landon, to join him out at the plantation for the big day and Whitney, who disapproves of Thomas and Kathryn’s relationship, makes a point of showing up late.
12	2	"Guess Who's Coming To Dinner"	March 23, 2015	0.91
Thomas invites the gang to another one of his unpredictable dinner parties and this time he and Kathryn have some big news to share. As Cameran continues chasing her real estate dreams, Craig refuses to settle into office life. Meanwhile, Landon is ready to leave her old LA life behind and get back a Southern Lifestyle.
13	3	"Raising the Roof"	March 30, 2015	0.93
Shep and Whitney finally move into their beach house as Kathryn confronts Jennifer Snowden about the true nature of her relationship with Thomas. Meanwhile, Cameran gives Craig some sisterly advice, which promptly goes in one ear and out the other. And after Thomas enlists Whitney's help in making the perfect campaign commercial his relationship with Kathryn takes a turn for the worse.
14	4	"No Good Deed"	April 6, 2015	0.87
After Thomas tells Kathryn about his “Raise the Roof” campaign ad, she ditches him to spend the night with a friend before turning her ire towards the real culprit, Whitney. Meanwhile, Landon helps Cooper prep for his upcoming fashion show and Craig decides not to study for the bar in order to focus on his newly found passion for modeling. Cameran enlists Shep’s help in her quest to get Craig back on the path to ambition and Whitney comes under attack when he comes face to face with Kathryn at Thomas’ fundraiser.
15	5	"Shep-istotle"	April 13, 2015	0.86
After another fundraiser goes awry, Thomas realizes it’s time for Kathryn to get a hobby, so she won’t further exacerbate his campaign stress and he agrees to move her downtown into a house she can decorate. Meanwhile, on the eve of Cooper and Landon’s fashion show, Shep decides to stage an intervention with Craig before he becomes a lost cause. And Whitney vows to avoid Kathryn at all costs at the fashion show.
16	6	"In The Cups"	April 20, 2015	0.94
As Shep plans his 35th birthday party, Cameran decides it might be time to get a dog so she can put off having a baby for just a little longer. Meanwhile, Thomas and Kathryn move downtown just as the campaign starts heating up. Despite hoping this will improve their relationship Kathryn starts to realize Thomas' campaign manager has other ideas. And when the gang finally gets together to celebrate at Shep's party things get old school.
17	7	"Better Late Than Never"	April 27, 2015	1.06
Patricia hosts an all-male dinner party to avoid the drama that women can bring and Whitney and Thomas end up fighting like a couple of girls. Meanwhile, Craig is homesick for the Delaware and invites Shep and Whitney to his parents’ house for the weekend, but not before Craig gets some potentially devastating news. When the gang gets dressed in their finest formal attire to attend Cooper's first annual Founders' Ball, Kathryn ends up home alone waiting for her Prince Charming, a.k.a.Thomas, to arrive.
18	8	"Unaware in Delaware"	May 4, 2015	0.98
After the Founders Ball, Craig comes face-to-face with his boss and finally learns the consequences of his partying ways. Meanwhile, Kathryn resolves to become a different person and put her troubles with Thomas behind her. When Shep and Whitney head to Delaware to spend some quality time with the Conover clan, tensions run high as secrets are revealed and friendships are tested.
19	9	"Jekyll And Snide"	May 11, 2015	0.96
Landon invites the gang to her hometown down in Georgia for a weekend getaway, but the mood changes when Shep’s big brotherly advice turns into a sibling rivalry with Craig. Meanwhile, Whitney finds himself on the receiving end of Kathryn's wrath once again and after Craig and Kathryn spend the night on the beach alone rumors start flying until an explosive accusation threatens to upend Thomas’ political aspirations.
20	10	"Election Day"	May 18, 2015	0.97
As Election Day approaches, Thomas deals with the aftermath of the accusations against him and Kathryn makes a decision that could impact her family and relationship forever. Meanwhile, Whitney suspects Kathryn is behind the allegations and when the gang gathers at Sermets to hear the election results it turns out that no one is in the mood to celebrate.
21	11	"Dysfunction Junction"	May 25, 2015	1.24
As Thomas adjusts to his new post-election life, Kathryn can't seem to let go of their old life together. Meanwhile, Patricia organizes a charity event to benefit "Wounded Warriors" and gets everyone involved; Whitney's band plays, and Shep and Craig agree to a date auction. When things don't go exactly as planned, relationships are pushed to the brink -- perhaps to never recover.
22	12	"Reunion"	June 1, 2015	1.12
Kathryn Calhoun Dennis, Landon Clements, Craig Conover, Cameran Eubanks, Thomas Ravenel, Shepard "Shep" Rose and Whitney Sudler-Smith come together for the first time to divulge what’s new in their lives and discuss some of the most-talked about highlights from this season. Andy Cohen hosts the Charleston crew as they set the record straight on all the drama and take a look back at some of the most memorable moments from season two.

=== Season 3 (2016) ===
No. overall	No. in season	Title	Original release date	US viewers (millions)
23	1	"HashtagNewCraig"	April 4, 2016	0.99
Craig returns to Charleston determined to prove he's a changed man. Together with his new girlfriend, Craig throws himself a "welcome back" party at his new digs and invites the gang to get back together again. Unfortunately, the feeling isn't mutual as Shep and Craig's bromance is still on the rocks. Meanwhile, Thomas and Kathryn have officially called it quits, with baby #2 on the way their tumultuous romance continues to create a wedge between them and their circle of friends.
24	2	"Miss Domesticated"	April 11, 2016	1.19
As Thomas slowly comes to the realization that he and Kathryn need to co-parent peacefully, Cameran decides to show off her burgeoning domestic skills by throwing a dinner party. Unfortunately, the guest list isn't as inclusive as some would like and tensions flare as Craig is put in the awkward position of coming to Kathryn's defense. Meanwhile, Shep continues to play the field and Landon starts to feel the economic pinch of her divorce.
25	3	"Hold Your Horses"	April 18, 2016	1.17
As Craig settles in to his new job working for JD, Cameran recruits Shep to be her real estate partner. Meanwhile, Landon hits her dad up for cash and Kathryn begs Thomas to co-sign the lease on her new house, but that deal comes with strings attached. So, when Kathryn and Kensie head out of town to watch Thomas play polo a family day turns into an epic showdown.
26	4	"Birds of a Feather..."	April 25, 2016	1.08
When Kathryn's pregnancy complications motivate Thomas to finally co-sign the lease on her new house, JD and Landon question the veracity of Kathryn's claims. Meanwhile, Cameran considers going to a therapist to help her understand her reluctance about motherhood. Craig stirs the pot when he questions Thomas' commitment to his baby mama, which, in turn, causes Thomas to unleash his wrath on Kathryn's BFF, Jennifer Snowden at Patricia's Flamingo party.
27	5	"Invite-gate"	May 2, 2016	1.11
While Craig continues to question the real reason why Kathryn is on the outs, Shep considers settling down with one lucky lady. Meanwhile, Kathryn comes to terms with her volatile past and attempts to make her way back into the group by reaching out to Cameran. Landon prepares for a "Shepic" birthday party, which leaves Shep wondering if Landon even knows him at all.
28	6	"Beast of Bourbon"	May 9, 2016	1.00
After experiencing a string of rejections, Kathryn reaches out to an old friend in hopes of making amends. Meanwhile, Landon nervously heads to New York for the opportunity of a lifetime as Thomas grows increasingly fearful for the health of his unborn child and turns to Shep for help. When Craig takes a big step forward in his relationship with Naomie, he receives a crushing blow from JD at work that sets him two steps back.
29	7	"Blue Ridge Mountain Blues"	May 16, 2016	1.16
Tired of the anti-Kathryn brigade, Craig digs deep into the past to get to the root of all the animosity. Meanwhile, Cameran reveals more than she bargained for in her first therapy session and Thomas wonders if Kathryn is sincere when she gives him the okay to go to North Carolina. And just as the gang settles into the serenity of the mountains, it all unravels as secrets are revealed and friendships tested.
30	8	"Whit's End"	May 23, 2016	1.18
When Craig voices his theory about Whitney and Kathryn, he learns that not everyone shares his opinion. With the mountain trip ruined and the group dynamic strained, Craig embarks on a road to redemption to salvage his friendships with Cameran and Whitney before he becomes odd man out. Meanwhile, back in Charleston Kathryn breaks the news to Thomas that the baby is coming ahead of schedule, thwarting his plans for a guys' weekend in L.A.
31	9	"Saints and Sinners"	May 30, 2016	1.14
As Thomas and Kathryn get ready to welcome their son into the world, JD questions whether Thomas is actually the father. Meanwhile, Craig leaves his Gentry responsibilities behind and heads to LA for a boys' weekend and to make amends with Whitney. And as Shep enjoys the single life in LA, Landon reveals to Cameran that she's been harboring feelings for her bestie all along.
32	10	"From Here to Paternity"	June 6, 2016	1.27
With the arrival of their son St. Julien, Thomas and Kathryn begin taking 'baby' steps towards a possible reconciliation. Meanwhile, Shep is dealt a blow in his relationship with Bailey, but will a surprising declaration from Landon help mend his broken heart? Meanwhile, Craig reconnects with his former boss to get advice about returning to the world of law, and a talk between Cameran and her mom about having children leads to an unexpected conclusion. And when Patricia hosts an all male dinner honoring Thomas' newborn son, shocking revelations and fiery accusations give the proud father little reason to celebrate.
33	11	"Words of Wisdom"	June 13, 2016	1.36
After questions about Baby Julien's paternity arise, Thomas is determined to prove that Kathryn and the kids should not be overlooked. Meanwhile, Patricia takes Landon under her wing to show her how to make Shep swoon. And when Thomas hosts a dinner party to celebrate his new house and new family, a toast that’s meant to bring the gang together, just might tear them apart forever.
34	12	"Founder's Brawl"	June 20, 2016	1.23
In the aftermath of T-Rav's dinner party fiasco, Kathryn relishes the fact that Thomas finally had her back against her arch-nemesis, Landon. Meanwhile, JD and Whitney stage an intervention to air their concerns over Thomas' erratic behavior as Cameran finally finds peace of mind at her second therapy session. And just as things in Charleston seem to be simmering down, the gang gets together at the second annual Founder's Ball where all the tension comes to a boil.
35	13	"Reunion Part 1"	June 27, 2016	1.27
The cast of Southern Charm rehashes the tumultuous season in the first episode of the two-part reunion. #NewCraig is put in the hot seat, Cameran gets called out for being a mean girl and Shep recounts a surprise prison stint. And as Thomas and Kathryn's touchy relationship continues to be in the news thanks to new allegations, it's the simmering resentment between Landon and Kathryn that forces one cast member to walk off set.
36	14	"Reunion Part 2"	July 5, 2016	1.23
On the dramatic conclusion of the Southern Charm reunion, Kathryn and Landon continue to argue over the details of Landon and Thomas' alleged relationship. Meanwhile, Jennifer Snowden admits a shocking new twist in her liaison with Thomas. Shep and Craig try to stay above the fray and in doing so expose their true allegiances. And, a surprise reconciliation between two former foes has Cameran speechless.

=== Season 4 (2017) ===
Sudler-Smith departed as a series regular. Austen Kroll joins the main cast.

No. overall	No. in season	Title	Original release date	US viewers (millions)
37	1	"While the Kat's Away"	April 3, 2017	1.25
Summer is over and the hot mess express has rolled back into town. Thomas has full custody of his two children and has risen to the challenge of being a single dad, by mostly giving up his former playboy lifestyle. Shep, however continues to be Charleston's perennial bachelor and now, thanks to Craig's lying ways, has a new wingman, Austen. Not only does Austen look like a younger version of Shep, he's also giving him a run for his money with the ladies. Cameran, meanwhile, is still determined to see Shep settle down and is convinced she knows just the girl who can reel him in. On the other side of town Landon, who after fleeing the rumors unleashed by Kathryn's accusations, is back in Charleston with a new boyfriend and determined to turn her travel website, into a success. Meanwhile, after a stint in rehab over the summer Kathryn has returned, and according to Thomas, refusing to take a drug test. Or is she?
38	2	"Roamin' Holiday"	April 10, 2017	1.18
As Cameran gets a sneak peek at motherhood, Kathryn's trip to Malibu proved to be more than just sun bathing and surfing. Meanwhile, Shep confronts Craig once again about the true nature of his legal career, but leaves their friendship on the field. And as Landon prepares to launch her website, a new romance begins to percolate as Thomas realizes he needs a step-mother for his children.
39	3	"Step and Release"	April 17, 2017	1.16
Craig attempts to "adult" by helping Naomie throw a fundraiser, but the differences in their planning styles threatens to expose the cracks in their relationship. Meanwhile, Kathryn takes steps to become more responsible, just as Thomas decides it's time to rekindle his friendship with Landon. Later, it seems that Cameran's matchmaking skills are finally paying off after Shep and Chelsea share a romantic evening together. But when Shep leaves town without making his intentions known, Austen swoops in to take his place.
40	4	"ShepWrecked"	April 24, 2017	1.25
Kathryn struggles with supervised visitation with her children as Craig judges Thomas' parenting style. However, while Craig meddles in the affairs of his friends, his life with Naomie is slowly starting to fall apart. Meanwhile, at Shep's 37th birthday party Whitney confronts Landon about her true feelings for Thomas, while Cameran tries to convince Shep it's not too late to win Chelsea back before she sails off into the sunset with Austen.
41	5	"Craig of All Trades, Master of None"	May 1, 2017	1.11
Cameran turns to the supernatural in hopes of finding her life's purpose, while Thomas takes a leap of faith by asking Landon out on a date. Shep confronts Austen about his bro-code violation over a game of basketball and faces a health scare in the process. Naomie reaches her boiling point when she learns of Craig's latest endeavor, and tensions rise when she questions his plans for the future.
42	6	"To Liver or Die in Charleston"	May 8, 2017	1.29
After going to the doctor, Shep receives some shocking news about his health causing him to take a step back from his party boy ways. Meanwhile, love is in the air as Austen and Chelsea deepen their romantic bond, and Thomas and Landon's connection is tested over a casual dinner at Patricia's house. And when Jennifer hosts a Sip and See to celebrate her new baby, Craig finally seals the deal on an investment property while his relationship with Naomie continues to unravel.
43	7	"Fowl Play"	May 15, 2017	1.16
As Kathryn contemplates a reunion with the father of her children, Patricia continues to push Landon and Thomas closer together. Craig and Naomie attempt to reconcile after their latest blow up, and Shep plans a hunting getaway for the group. Meanwhile, Cameran, ever hopeful that Shep and Chelsea will find true love, has to admit defeat when Chelsea falls for Austen's hunting prowess. And as the two love birds head off to their love shack, Shep's pursuit of health and happiness seems to come to an end.
44	8	"Sari, Not Sari"	May 22, 2017	1.11
Craig and Naomie visit a therapist to help save their increasingly rocky relationship while Austen and Chelsea continue to grow closer. But after, Shep runs into Austen and Landon at a bar, he's convinced there's more going on between them than meets the eye. Meanwhile, Kathryn writes Thomas a letter in the hopes that they can finally move forward and co-parent. Patricia hosts an Indian themed dinner in honor of her new caftan line, and invites an Indian healer who reveals the gangs' future. But it's Whitney's revelation that Kathryn has also reached out to him that shocks the group the most.
45	9	"Guess Who's Coming to Lunch"	May 29, 2017	1.26
After the chaos of Patricia's dinner, it seems some fortunes are coming true. Cameran agrees to see if Kathryn has really changed her ways, and brings along a surprise guest. Meanwhile, Austen and Craig discuss the possibility that Shep may still have his heart set on Chelsea. Landon prepares to squash a potential relationship, but it seems she can't escape her fate.
46	10	"The Hangover"	June 5, 2017	1.33
As Thomas and Kathryn break their year-long standoff to celebrate their son's first birthday together, Patricia continues her quest to make Landon Saint and Kensie's new step-mother. Cameran begins to rethink motherhood and Craig proves he's finally all grown up when he gets the keys to his new house. Meanwhile, after Shep decides that he needs to get out of downtown Cameran offers to show him a house and quickly discovers that he may be in need of more than just a new address.
47	11	"Boys Gone Wild"	June 12, 2017	1.26
After Thomas agrees to let Kathryn do a photo shoot with Kensie, the reality of their situation becomes impossible to ignore. Meanwhile, Craig and Naomie question whether they should even continue to be a couple. When Chelsea tells Austen of a late night encounter with Shep, friendships are pushed to the brink.
48	12	"A Tribe Called key West"	June 19, 2017	1.43
Tensions are high as the group heads further down south for Cam's birthday trip to Key West. Austen questions Chelsea's commitment to their relationship after she changes her story about the incident with Shep, and Craig finds himself on thin ice with Naomie. Meanwhile, Kathryn reveals shocking new information about Thomas and Landon's relationship. And when she confronts Landon face to face at a group dinner chaos ensues after Craig intervenes and Thomas witnesses the ultimate betrayal.
49	13	"Ain't No Thang Like a Chicken Wing"	June 26, 2017	1.48
In the season finale, Landon and Kathryn's Key West apology sends shockwaves through the South leaving Thomas a gentleman scorned and the rest of the Charleston crew in bizzaro-land. Meanwhile, as Chelsea and Austen struggle to define their relationship, Craig and Naomie decide the fate of theirs. Kathryn and Thomas seem to finally be on the up and up while Shep continues to spiral down, down, down. When the group gathers for JD's party, old tensions are renewed when Craig is pushed to his limit by Shep.
50	14	"Reunion Part 1"	July 10, 2017	1.33
The cast of Southern Charm rehashes the season in the first episode of the two-part reunion. Cameran unveils her latest accessory, as Craig and Naomie reveal the status of their relationship. Meanwhile, Shep continues to give Craig and Landon a hard time as Austen proves himself to be a more sympathetic version of his mentor. Kathryn and Jennifer confront their past friendship and Thomas issues a threat that leaves the cast speechless.
51	15	"Reunion Part 2"	July 17, 2017	1.28
On the dramatic conclusion of the Southern Charm reunion, Kathryn and Landon argue over the details of Landon and Thomas' alleged three day tryst. And as Chelsea confronts Shep about the infamous night at the Commodore, Whitney reveals why he thought Austen was overreacting. Also, Andy tries to resolve the issue of which one of the guys was being the meaner drunk and presents a sneak peek at the new series Relationshep.

=== Season 5 (2018) ===
Clements departed as a series regular. Chelsea Meissner joins the main cast.

No. overall	No. in season	Title	Original release date	US viewers (millions)
52	1	"The Break-Up Bunch"	April 5, 2018	1.03
There have been a lot of changes in Charleston! As Cameran prepares for the birth of her baby girl, her favorite man-child, Shep, confesses to the downfall of his relationship following his summer quest to find love. Despite giving it their best shot, both couples Craig and Naomie and Austen and Chelsea have finally called it quits. Meanwhile, Kathryn is celebrating her second year of sobriety and finally has a place of her own near her children. Thomas has a new love interest, and all of Charleston is buzzing about what will happen when she finally meets Kathryn.
53	2	"The Break-Up Bunch Part 2"	April 12, 2018	1.15
Shep hosts his first ever "adult" dinner party where Craig's anxieties over seeing Naomie mount and Austen remains hopeful that he can win Chelsea back. Kathryn finally meets Ashley, the woman determined to be the next Mrs. Ravenel. Meanwhile, the girls ban together in support of one another and Naomie stands up to JD in defense of Elizabeth; leading to the ultimate BBQ showdown.
54	3	"Groovy Baby"	April 19, 2018	1.29
Patricia surprises Cameran by planning a glamorous retro baby shower, but not everyone gets an invite. At the shower, Craig and Naomie fall back into old habits and an unexpected guest turns the event on its head. As Cameran begins to face the realities of becoming a new mother, Kathryn makes up for lost time with her kids. Meanwhile, Thomas considers his future with Ashley.
55	4	"All Talk No Action"	April 26, 2018	1.14
Kathryn takes the high road by inviting Thomas’ new girlfriend, Ashley, to lunch. Meanwhile, as Cameran’s due date approaches, her anxieties over becoming a mom subside. After spending time with Cameran, Chelsea begins to fear motherhood may never be in her future. Austen concocts a plan to get Craig back in the dating saddle. Unfortunately, Craig’s sights are set on winning Naomie back until a heated conversation between the pair threatens their future.
56	5	"Pulp Friction"	May 3, 2018	1.20
As Thomas ponders his next steps with Ashley, Patricia encourages him to propose. Austen's parents push him to make some strides professionally, while Craig hires a coach to help him get his life on track. Naomie gets wind of Craig's new crush, and turns Austen's Halloween party into a house of horrors when she comes face to face with the woman.
57	6	"Exes on the Half Shell"	May 10, 2018	1.32
Naomie prepares to open her family's new restaurant, and finally comes to terms with the fact that she isn't over Craig. Meanwhile, Patricia and Craig have a heart-to-heart about relationships. Cameran tries an old fashioned trick to get baby Palmer to make an appearance with the gang. Thomas gets himself into hot water with Ashley after she sees him flirting with Kathryn. Meanwhile, Shep steps in to help Austen and Chelsea define their relationship.
58	7	"Kat's Got Your Tongue"	May 17, 2018	1.32
Cameran suspects that she may be experiencing labor pains. Kathryn prepares for her first day of work, while Craig helps Austen realize things are over with Chelsea and refocuses on wooing Victoria. Patricia tries to make Ashley into the perfect Southern Belle and hosts a dinner party with the men of Charleston to test her skills. At the party, it seems Thomas only has eyes for Kathryn...and he may not be the only one.
59	8	"What Da Fuskie"	May 24, 2018	1.32
Cameran plays the pregnancy waiting game while the rest of the gang prepares for a trip to Shep and Chelsea's hometown, Hilton Head. Meanwhile, feuding exes, Craig and Naomie, attempt to act civil with the help of an old furry friend. Austen decides to rekindle his romance with Victoria, but fears Chelsea's reaction. As Kathryn plans her son's birthday, Thomas' girlfriend gets sour from the invitation snub. Tensions flare at a beachfront argument, changing one relationship for good.
60	9	"Hilton Head-Ache"	May 31, 2018	1.42
Emotions run high during the gang's first night in Hilton Head, when Ashley confronts Kathryn. After the group is forced to pick sides, everyone is walking on eggshells for the rest of the weekend. When the last flare up comes, it's Austen who gets burned when a flirtation with Chelsea comes back to haunt him.
61	10	"Family Ties"	June 7, 2018	1.57
As the Hilton Head trip comes to an end, Shep visits his mom and finally admits some truths about himself, as Chelsea takes a trip down memory lane and opens up about her past. Meanwhile, back in Charleston, Austen attempts to make amends with Victoria, and Cameran finally welcomes her new bundle of joy. When everyone comes together to celebrate Saint's second birthday, Thomas and Kathryn finally find the sweet spot with their co-parenting. Ashley, on the other hand, has a bone to pick that might just send her packing.
62	11	"Beer and Trembling"	June 14, 2018	1.43
Austen prepares to debut his beer to his family and friends and Craig makes progress on his pillows for Patricia. Cameran tries to adjust to her new life with baby Palmer, while Kathryn and Shep spend some quality time together. Ashley returns from California, but her relationship with Thomas is still on the rocks. Meanwhile, Chelsea and Victoria finally cross paths at Austen's beer tasting event, putting him on the spot about their relationships.
63	12	"Gone Girl"	June 21, 2018	1.49
After basking in the glory of his successful beer event, Austen is hit with romantic reality and Craig faces some harsh truths. Meanwhile, as Thomas and Ashley struggle to resolve their issues, Chelsea feels vindicated when she hears some news from Shep. Cameran finally gets to enjoy some freedom from motherhood, Kathryn goes MIA and her friends fear the worst.
64	13	"Game Changer"	June 28, 2018	1.46
Thomas continues to pressure Ashley to get a job in Charleston, leaving them in relationship limbo. Meanwhile, Chelsea and Austen come to terms with the state of their friendship, while Craig and Naomie, once again, try to navigate dating post break-up. After Thomas invites the gang to watch him play in his last polo match out at Brookland Plantation, Kathryn must face her fears of returning to the place she thought would be her happily ever after.
65	14	"Ho, Ho, Ho"	July 12, 2018	1.48
After 5 years of constant tension, Patricia finally extends an olive branch and invites Kathryn to her Winter Ball. As these two former enemies make peace, the delicate truce between Craig and Naomie blows up when he brings a date to the Ball. Meanwhile, as Austen tries to warn Thomas that there's a nasty rumor circulating about Ashley, he's the one that gets burned by Ashley. When Kathryn and Ashley finally sit down to talk for the first time since Hilton Head, their conversation quickly turns combative.
66	15	"Reunion Part 1"	July 19, 2018	1.48
After a season of betrayals, accusations and stunning revelations, the cast of Southern Charm come together to face the music and each other, minus one Charmer. When Naomie explains why she was on the offensive this season, Craig takes a page from the #meanNaomie handbook and lashes out. Meanwhile, as Kathryn celebrates her personal growth, a rare emotional outburst from Cameran proves that motherhood has brought the two women closer and united them against common foe.
67	16	"Reunion Part 2"	July 26, 2018	1.50
On the dramatic conclusion of the Southern Charm reunion, Austen and Chelsea finally put to rest whether they will ever be more than just friends. Meanwhile, Shep gets candid about his personal activities with Kathryn. As soon as Ashley goes toe to toe with the entire cast, major revelations come to light which turn the tables in an unexpected direction and leaving Kathryn to intervene.

=== Season 6 (2019) ===
Ravenel departed as a series regular. Eliza Limehouse and Naomie Olindo are added to the main cast.

No. overall	No. in season	Title	Original release date	US viewers (millions)
68	1	"RSVPeeved"	May 15, 2019	1.25
As Charleston reels over Thomas' arrest, Kathryn deals with conflicting emotions; Cameran struggles to balance motherhood and her career; the friends gather at Patricia's dinner party, during which they are shocked by the revelation of a secret romp.
69	2	"Kat's Out of the Bag"	May 22, 2019	1.23
Cameran gives Eliza an earful about her behavior at Patricia's party; Whitney is in the hot seat over rumors about his relationship status; Chelsea hosts a house warming party; Cameran spills the beans about Whitney and Kathryn's secret liaison.
70	3	"Slide Into Your DMs Like…"	May 29, 2019	1.37
Naomie juggles her clothing company and her family's restaurant empire; as Kathryn opens up about her new boyfriend, Craig becomes the town gossip, spreading rumors about Kat's new man and Austen's girlfriend.
71	4	"Barking Up the Wrong Tree House"	June 5, 2019	1.34
Austen has second thoughts about breaking up with Madison; Chelsea learns Austen has been badmouthing her around town; a shocking experience gives Eliza a new lease on life; Kathryn pulls another one of her stunts before the girls' trip.
72	5	"In Sew Deep"	June 12, 2019	1.28
Kathryn and Danni leave the girls' trip on frosty terms; Cameran realizes she needs to get back to work; Craig decides to host a party to trick his friends into helping him sew pillows; Chelsea lays into Austen for talking behind her back.
73	6	"A Salt and Battery"	June 19, 2019	1.32
To get Austen's mind off his ex, the guys rent an RV and head into the great outdoors; Chelsea steps up her hair game; Eliza tries to mend fences; Cam finally asks for help with Palmer; Kathryn and Danni's friendship is at an icy standstill.
74	7	"Dick Moves and Dick Pics"	June 26, 2019	1.15
The guys hit the town in Nashville, Tenn., in their attempt to get Austen over Madison; Patricia hosts a female-only dinner party that is even raunchier than the boys' night out, as the women share some secrets of their own.
75	8	"New Craig, Who Dis?"	July 3, 2019	1.01
Shep adjusts to life with his new puppy, Little Craig; Chelsea holds Austen's feet to the fire; Kathryn and Naomie get enlightened; when Cameran hosts an oyster roast for her 35th birthday party, she gets "turnt," and Craig the human gets livid.
76	9	"Sorry Not Sorry"	July 10, 2019	1.23
The group decides to take a trip to Colorado to help Cameran rediscover her mojo; Naomie refuses to go; Eliza hosts the gang for a day of skeet shooting at her family's plantation and invites a blast from the past, which backfires big time.
77	10	"Rock Mountain High Park One"	July 17, 2019	1.27
Kathryn confronts Whitney about a rumor; Cameran reveals to Shep that she's invited Madison to her birthday ski trip in Colorado; the trip gets off to a rocky start as a frustrated Craig unleashes his pent-up fury.
78	11	"Rock Mountain High Park Two"	July 24, 2019	1.25
Chelsea, Cameran, Eliza, Danni, and Kathryn hit the slopes for their first-ever ski lesson, while Craig, Austen and Madison go snowboarding; Austen and Madison's relationship heats up; tensions arise during a cannabis-infused dinner.
79	12	"Who Put the Mad in Madison?"	July 31, 2019	1.20
After a raucous night in Colorado, Cameran and Whitney hightail it back to Charleston, while the others hit the hot springs; Austen and Madison's road to reconciliation is a rocky one; Madison repeats a rumor that throws Shep and Danni under the bus.
80	13	"Outfoxed"	August 7, 2019	1.14
Shep's ultimatum to Austen is tested after he and Madison reconcile; Ashley asks for another chance, and Eliza invites her to the fox hunt; Ashley and Kathryn come face to face for the first time in a year, and the gang prepares for a brawl.
81	14	"White Gloves Off"	August 14, 2019	1.28
The socialites get ready for another grand event hosted by Miss Patricia; battle lines are drawn when Austen learns that Shep and Craig's dates are the women from his infamous threesome video; Ashley considers crashing the event.
82	15	"Reunion Part 1"	August 21, 2019	1.26
On the first part of the Southern Charm Reunion, Naomie defends her boyfriend from accusations that he is controlling and Shep admits he has anger issues that stem from his elitism. Meanwhile, Cameran accuses Craig of having an Adderall addiction and Austen questions Kathryn's sobriety.
83	16	"Reunion Part 2"	August 28, 2019	1.19
On the second hour of the Southern Charm Reunion, Danni tells Kathryn she is hurt by her newfound friendship with Madison. Meanwhile, Madison, Danni and Shep go head to head. Finally, Austen has to answer the question of whether or not he made up the rumor about Shep and Danni.

=== Season 7 (2020–21) ===
Wimberly, Meissner, Limehouse, and Olindo departed the series. Leva Bonaparte, Madison LeCroy, and John Pringle are added to the main cast.

No. overall	No. in season	Title	Original release date	US viewers (millions)
84	1	"The Good Shephard"	October 29, 2020	0.85
Austen and Madison are back together, and their bond is stronger than ever – but it’s Craig who’s moved in with him after his house was damaged by a flood. Living with someone from her past, Kathryn reveals a bit of gossip to Craig and finds herself unprepared for the repercussions. With a new girlfriend and a therapist in tow, Shep’s new and improved attitude leaves him determined to keep his nose out of his everyone’s business. But an unexpected twist has his friends wondering if he’s really changed at all.
85	2	"Charleston Whine and Food Festival"	November 5, 2020	0.70
Shep continues to spread gossip at his party, upsetting Madison and ultimately affecting his friendship with Austen. Meanwhile, Leva comes to Cameran’s defense and confronts Kathryn for igniting the rumor mill. Patricia suggests John pursue Madison. With the biggest beer event of Austen’s career on the horizon, he wonders if his friends will show up to support or sabotage his big day.
86	3	"A Pair and a Spare"	November 12, 2020	0.85
Leva hosts a Persian Dinner for the girls, while the boys go out and discover John doesn't honor bro-code. Meanwhile, pigs officially fly when Shep and Taylor double-date with Austen and Madison. And when Kathryn finds out a secret about Thomas, her fantasy of them getting back together crumbles.
87	4	"Single and Ready to Pringle"	November 19, 2020	0.84
The guys prepare for Patricia's annual dinner party, despite tensions among the group. John follows Patricia’s advice and decides to pursue Madison, even though it means breaking bro-code with his friend Austen. Meanwhile, Kathryn refocuses her life after learning that Thomas has a new baby on the way. Everything comes to a screeching halt when Charleston is forced to deal with the onset of Coronavirus.
88	5	"Monumental Challenge"	December 3, 2020	0.84
The past two months have seen so many changes, not just in Charleston but around the world. A global pandemic. Schools, restaurants, and other public spaces closed. Residents asked to quarantine at home. Not to mention, political rallies and other protests. As Charleston reopens, everyone comes to grips with their “new normal.”
89	6	"Love Sick"	December 10, 2020	0.86
John cozies up to Madison as she reaches a decision about Austen. After Craig debuts his HSN line, Patricia has an announcement of her own. Meanwhile, Shep and his girlfriend struggle with the pressures of quarantine, and Leva confronts Kathryn over issues of race and privilege.
90	7	"Low Country Broil"	December 17, 2020	0.82
Shep tries to appease Taylor. Kathryn continues to face the consequences of what happened online even after she apologized. Austen doesn't want to accept the end of his and Madison's relationship.
91	8	"It's My Party and I'll Go If I Want To..."	January 7, 2021	0.91
On the heels of their break up, Madison invites everyone to what was supposed to be Austen's birthday party. After Craig advises her to disinvite the birthday boy, Austen decides to show up anyway. Meanwhile, Kathryn struggles in her friendships with Danni and Madison Simon, who are determined to have it out with her once and for all. When they all gather on Capers, a private island with no way in or out except by ferry, what could possibly go wrong?
92	9	"Treehouse of Cards Pt.1"	January 14, 2021	0.93
It’s sink or swim on the two-part season finale opener, as Pringle and Shep cohost a “good times” pool party. Leva finally calls out the boys on their unyielding defense of Kathryn, and questions if they know all sides to the story. And while Craig may have found his storybook romance, Austen looks to close the chapter on Madison for good.
93	10	"Treehouse of Cards Pt.2"	January 21, 2021	0.90
As the finale concludes, fireworks fly when Madison learns Austen has been hooking up with another woman. While Kathryn finally confronts her DM scandal, other fractures in the group threaten to finally break their friendships.
94	11	"Reunion Part 1"	January 28, 2021	0.96
Craig holds nothing back when confronting Madison for a snide comment she made about his relationship; a scorned Austen questions his ex-girlfriend's motives; Shep's fidelity to his girlfriend is called into question.
95	12	"Reunion Part 2"	February 4, 2021	1.10
The Southern Charm reunion concludes with a rollercoaster of emotions. As Craig stews over his strained friendship with Madison, newbie John finds himself in the hot seat for continuously breaking bro-code. Just as Austen finally comes to terms with his recent breakup, Madison shocks the group with news of another budding romance. Meanwhile, Leva and Kathryn desperately try to come to an understanding about the emoji controversy. Except this time, Kathryn is not the only one Leva calls out for living in a 'bubble of privilege.'
96	13	"Secrets Revealed"	February 11, 2021	0.58

=== Season 8 (2022) ===
Naomie Olindo returned as a series regular. Venita Aspen, Taylor Ann Green, Olivia Flowers, and Chleb Ravenell joined the main cast.

No. overall	No. in season	Title	Original release date	US viewers (millions)
97	1	"Great Ex-pectations"	June 23, 2022	0.73
98	2	"Suspicious Minds"	June 30, 2022	0.65
99	3	"Barbecues, Breakups & Betrothals"	July 7, 2022	0.72
100	4	"It's My Party and I'll Fight if I Want To"	July 14, 2022	0.59
101	5	"Exes and Uh Oh's"	July 21, 2022	0.68
102	6	"Shuckers and Sinners"	July 28, 2022	0.67
103	7	"Clean Slates and Secret Dates"	August 4, 2022	0.69
104	8	"Holy Mutt-rimony"	August 11, 2022	0.65
105	9	"Auldbrass Glitters Is Not Gold"	August 18, 2022	0.63
106	10	"Walking on Eggshells"	August 25, 2022	0.64
107	11	"Guess Who's Coming to Friendsgiving"	September 1, 2022	0.73
108	12	"Guys and Dolls"	September 8, 2022	0.64
109	13	"St. Simon Says Fight!"	September 15, 2022	0.69
110	14	"Trawlin' and Brawlin'"	September 22, 2022	0.60
111	15	"Wreck the Halls"	September 29, 2022	0.75
112	16	"Reunion Part 1"	October 6, 2022	0.78
113	17	"Reunion Part 2"	October 13, 2022	0.78

=== Season 9 (2023–24) ===
Dennis, Olindo, and Ravenell departed the series. Rod Razavi, Rodrigo Reyes, and Jarrett "JT" Thomas joined the main cast.

No. overall	No. in season	Title	Original release date	US viewers (millions)
114	1	"Vows, Vendettas and Vibrators"	September 14, 2023	0.70
115	2	"Spilling the JT"	September 21, 2023	0.57
116	3	"He Said, She Said"	September 28, 2023	0.60
117	4	"In Vino Veritas"	October 5, 2023	0.55
118	5	"Party Fowl"	October 12, 2023	0.51
119	6	"Family Bonds"	October 19, 2023	0.65
120	7	"The Naked Truth"	October 26, 2023	0.70
121	8	"Bra-gate"	November 2, 2023	0.66
122	9	"Strange Bedfellows"	November 9, 2023	0.63
123	10	"A Royal Reckoning"	November 16, 2023	0.65
124	11	"Jamaican Me Crazy"	November 30, 2023	0.67
125	12	"Chasing Waterfalls"	December 7, 2023	0.76
126	13	"Choppy Waters"	December 14, 2023	0.70
127	14	"Playing House"	December 21, 2023	0.71
128	15	"Beyond the Valley of the Southern Dolls"	January 4, 2024	0.86
129	16	"Reunion Part 1"	January 11, 2024	0.79
130	17	"Reunion Part 2"	January 18, 2024	0.84

=== Season 10 (2024–25) ===
Flowers and Razavi departed the series. Ryan Albert, Salley Carson, and Molly O'Connell joined the main cast.

No. overall	No. in season	Title	Original release date	US viewers (millions)
131	1	"Raising Cane"	December 5, 2024	0.54
132	2	"Off the Peep End"	December 12, 2024	0.53
133	3	"Gone to the Dogs"	December 19, 2024	0.53
134	4	"Sew Not Invited"	January 2, 2025	0.56
135	5	"Beer and Loathing"	January 9, 2025	0.61
136	6	"Making a Splash"	January 16, 2025	0.62
137	7	"Overtures and Outbursts"	January 23, 2025	0.61
138	8	"Red Flags"	January 30, 2025	0.59
139	9	"The Birds & the B's"	February 6, 2025	0.57
140	10	"Bahama Blues"	February 13, 2025	0.58
141	11	"Text Message in a Bottle"	February 20, 2025	0.68
142	12	"Lost at Sea"	February 27, 2025	0.63
143	13	"Sea's Just Not That Into You"	March 6, 2025	0.58
144	14	"The Telephone Game"	March 13, 2025	0.51
145	15	"Arrested Development"	March 20, 2025	0.60
146	16	"Reunion Part 1"	March 27, 2025	0.68
147	17	"Reunion Part 2"	April 3, 2025	0.60

=== Season 11 (2025–26) ===
Albert, Bonaparte, Green, and Thomas departed the series. Charley Manley and Whitner Slagsvol joined the main cast.

No. overall	No. in season	Title	Original release date	US viewers (millions)
148	1	"Single and Ready to Mingle"	November 19, 2025	0.49
149	2	"Making Waves"	November 26, 2025	0.38
150	3	"A Novel Approach"	December 3, 2025	0.40
151	4	"A Moveable Beast"	December 10, 2025	0.43
152	5	"Loose Lips and Deep Rifts"	December 17, 2025	0.43
153	6	"A Medium Rare Apology"	January 7, 2026	0.48
154	7	"Fowl Play"	January 14, 2026	0.42
155	8	"Engaged in Battle"	January 21, 2026	0.54
156	9	"Best Frenemies Forever"	January 28, 2026	0.58
157	10	"Two Truths and a Single Guy"	February 4, 2026	0.56
158	11	"Cabin Fever"	February 11, 2026	0.53
159	12	"Even Further South"	February 18, 2026	0.58
160	13	"Kiss and Tell"	February 25, 2026	0.62
161	14	"About Last Night"	March 4, 2026	0.58
162	15	"Carolina Dazed"	March 11, 2026	0.62
163	16	"Reunion Part 1"	March 18, 2026	0.53
164	17	"Reunion Part 2"	March 25, 2026	0.48
