= Southern Hospitality (TV series) =

American reality television series on Bravo

- Genre: Reality
- Starring: Leva Bonaparte; Bradley Carter; Emmy Sharrett; Grace Lilly; Joe Bradley; Lucía Peña; Maddi Reese; Mia Alario; Mikel Simmons; TJ Dinch; Will Kulp; Oisin O'Neill; Molly Moore; Lake Rucker; Michols Peňa; Austin Stephan; Justin Assad; Bella Starcher
- Country of origin: United States
- Original language: English
- No. of seasons: 4
- No. of episodes: 45

Production
- Executive producers: Lamar Bonaparte; Leva Bonaparte; Josh Halpert; Bill Langworthy; Aaron Rothman
- Camera setup: Multi-camera
- Running time: 44 minutes
- Production company: Haymaker East

Original release
- Network: Bravo
- Release: November 28, 2022 – present

Related
- Southern Charm; Southern Charm Savannah; Southern Charm New Orleans

Southern Hospitality is an American reality television series which has been broadcast on Bravo since November 28, 2022. The show is the third spin-off of Southern Charm.

The series follows Southern Charm's Leva Bonaparte and the staff at her restaurants and bars: Republic Lounge & Garden and Bourbon and Bubbles Restaurant & Bar.

== Overview and casting ==
For the first four seasons, Southern Hospitality focuses on the careers and personal lives of the staff at Leva Bonaparte's restaurants and bars. The series is primarily centered around Republic Lounge & Garden, but occasionally features Bonaparte's other property Bourbon and Bubbles Restaurant & Bar. Bonaparte was first seen in season 7 of the show Southern Charm, which focuses around a group of friends navigating relationships, friendships, and life in Charleston, South Carolina. Not only is Bonaparte married and with a son, her husband Lamar Bonaparte is also her partner in all of their many restaurants, clubs, and bars, (Suglia, Hickman, & Raphael).

=== Season 1 ===
The first season aired from November 28, 2022, to January 23, 2023. The original cast consisted of: Bradley Carter, Emmy Sharrett, Grace Lilly, Joe Bradley, Lucía Peña, Maddi Reese, Mia Alario, Mikel Simmons, TJ Dinch, Will Kulp, and Leva Bonaparte as series regulars.

=== Season 2 ===
On November 4, 2023, it was announced that the second season would premiere December 7, 2023. All cast members from the previous season returned. Oisin O'Neill joined the cast as a series regular. The second season aired from December 7, 2023 - February 22, 2024. The reunion was taped as an episode of Watch What Happens Live with Andy Cohen. The reunion aired on February 22, 2024. An extended and uncensored version was made available on Peacock on February 23, 2024.

=== Season 3 ===
In May 2024, the series was renewed for a third season. The third season aired from January 2, 2025, to March 6, 2025. Molly Moore, Michols Peña, Lake Rucker and Austin Stephan joined the cast as new series regulars. Lucía Peña, Simmons and O'Neill did not return for the third season. The reunion was taped early 2025 as an episode of Watch What Happens Live. Will Kulp decided to not film the reunion on the day of the taping. However, he was in the building and watched from another room. The reunion aired on March 6, 2025, after the season finale. An uncensored version was made available for streaming on Peacock the next day. On May 7, 2025, the series was renewed for a fourth season. However, before the fourth season could air, Grace Lilly was arrested on December 29, 2025 on a second degree harassment charge after being found to be in possession of pills that she had no prescription for.

=== Season 4 ===
On January 22, 2026, it was announced that the fourth season would premiere on March 4, 2026. Will Kulp and Austin Stephan did not return for the fourth season. Justin Assad and Bella Starcher joined the cast. The fourth season aired from March 4, 2026, to June 10, 2026. Soon after the premiere of the fourth season, series regular Grace Lilly would be arrested for the second time in three months for possession of a controlled substance. The reunion was taped on April 16, 2026. Unlike seasons two and three, the season four reunion was not taped in the Watch What Happens Live studio. Starcher was not present at the reunion.

=== Season 5 ===
On October 23, 2026, the series was renewed for a fifth season. Bonaparte announced her departure from Bravo in a comment on Threads. Bonaparte and her husband, Lamar, are expected to retain their executive producer credits.

=== Timeline of the cast ===
Main cast members
Cast member	Seasons			
Cast member	1	2	3	4
Mia Alario	Main	Main	Main	Main
Leva Bonaparte	Main	Main	Main	Main
Joe Bradley	Main	Main	Main	Main
Bradley Carter	Main	Main	Main	Main
TJ Dinch	Main	Main	Main	Main
Grace Lilly	Main	Main	Main	Main
Maddi Reese	Main	Main	Main	Main
Emmy Sharrett	Main	Main	Main	Main
Will Kulp	Main	Main	Main	
Mikel Simmons	Main	Main		
Lucía Peña	Main	Main	Guest	Guest
Oisin O’Neill		Main	Guest	Guest
Austin Stephan			Main	
Molly Moore			Main	Main
Michols Peña			Main	Main
Lake Rucker			Main	Main
Justin Assad				Main
Bella Starcher				Main

== Episodes ==
=== Series overview ===
Season	Episodes	Originally released	
Season	Episodes	First released	Last released
1	8	November 28, 2022	January 23, 2023
2	11	December 7, 2023	February 22, 2024
3	11	January 2, 2025	March 6, 2025
4	15	March 4, 2026	June 10, 2026

=== Season 1 (2022–2023) ===
No. overall	No. in season	Title	Original release date	U.S. viewers (millions)
1	1	"The Republic of Leva"	November 28, 2022	0.34
Charleston restaurateur Leva Bonaparte celebrates her birthday at her hugely successful club, Republic, but fighting between her young, attractive staff threatens to disrupt the party. Grace Lilly feels betrayed by former best friend Maddi for calling out her failings at work. Mikel faces discipline from Leva and outrage from the staff when he's caught promoting another club. Joe Bradley reveals romantic feelings for Maddi but realizes he may be too late when her ex-boyfriend steps back into the picture.
2	2	"Clocking In... Coming Out"	December 5, 2022	0.26
Leva brings Mikel back to Republic but makes him prove his dedication by doing dirty work. Grace Lilly fires back at TJ for attacking her work ethic and judging her steamy social media posts. Maddi makes Joe Bradley jealous by bringing her ex-boyfriend to a work event. Mikel risks losing his best friend from the church when he reveals the truth about his sexuality.
3	3	"Toxic Tea Party"	December 12, 2022	0.23
Mia faces pressure from her dad about her career choices and love life. A back injury leaves Joe on the floor, making room for Mikel to earn back his spot as VIP host. TJ continues to fuel the fire with Mikel, causing a blow up at Grace Lilly's Alice in Wonderland birthday party. Nothing can bring Grace down, however, when she's given another chance to prove herself at Republic.
4	4	"Off to the Races"	December 19, 2022	0.32
When Grace Lily's birthday party takes a turn, Mikel questions if he can continue to work at Republic. Grace's enthusiasm gets her back into Leva's good graces, but Will's wild night rubs his co-workers the wrong way. Maddi invites everyone to a NASCAR race in her hometown of Charlotte, where Trevor meets her parents for the very first time since their breakup.
5	5	"Rock the Boat"	January 2, 2023	0.30
The Republic crew parties on Lake Norman, but when Leva sees their inappropriate Instagram posts, she threatens to fire people. After Grace Lilly learns that Mia's friend went on a date with her crush, her emotional outburst leaves her on the outs with the group. Mikel takes a leap of faith and invites a romantic interest to their party, but things take an awkward turn when his date is interrogated by Emmy.
6	6	"Rumor Has It"	January 9, 2023	0.35
Grace Lilly tries to impress Leva by creating a new event at Bourbon and Bubbles but worries no one will support her after the disastrous trip to Charlotte. Joe Bradley pursues a promotion that could impact his budding romance with Mia. The return of a controversial Republic employee causes division among the crew and unearths a scandalous rumor.
7	7	"Pride and Peanut Butter"	January 16, 2023	0.27
Leva needs the Republic team to work together for Pride weekend, but tensions run high in the aftermath of an explosive fight. Will decides whether to fulfill Emmy's hopes and go to law school or pursue his own dream of running a restaurant. Mikel and TJ put their differences aside to host an event. When Maddi drops an accusation against Bradley, he fires back.
8	8	"Women Scorned"	January 23, 2023	0.35
Grace Lilly throws an upscale event to host Leva's friends. Emmy urges Will to apply to law school. Lucía fights to save her impaired relationship with her son's father. After a record-breaking summer at Republic, Leva rewards the team with a luxurious yacht day where Joe Bradley finally admits his romantic feelings for Maddi, leading to a showdown with her boyfriend. Later on, when Mia finds out Joe professed romantic feelings for both her and Maddi, both women explode on him at Republic, landing Joe in hot water with Leva.

=== Season 2 (2023–2024) ===
No. overall	No. in season	Title	Original release date	U.S. viewers (millions)
9	1	"When Push Comes to Shovel"	December 7, 2023	0.34
The team at Republic is busier than ever; after Lucia loses her job, the rest of the VIP staff is on pins and needles; when a new cheating rumour arises and rocks Maddi's world, professional and personal boundaries are pushed.
10	2	"Message Delivered"	December 14, 2023	0.29
Bradley, Joe, and TJ learn about new VIP Server Oisin's side hustle; Mia apologizes for her outburst but not to Leva; Maddi snaps when a new detail about Trevor's cheating allegation surfaces.
11	3	"Once Upon a Lie"	December 21, 2023	0.35
Joe's bromance with Oisin continues to bloom, much to the chagrin of his close friends. Maddi's feeling toward Trevor get thrown for a loop when Mikel reveals shocking information from Trevor's night out. The group comes together for Grace Lilly's birthday bash, but when Oisin drops a major bombshell about an alleged hookup from boys night, things quickly take a turn for the worse. Will and Emmy question the loyalty of their closest friends.
12	4	"Rumor Has It"	January 4, 2024	0.38
Following Grace Lilly's birthday party, Will is left having to defend himself from the cheating rumors. Protective friend Mia takes things into her own hands and digs for the truth. Bradley attempts to escape the friends zone by asking Lucía out on a date. After Maddi drops the ball at Republic, Emmy grows tired of Maddi's leadership style and wonders if she can do the job better.
13	5	"Turning the Tables"	January 11, 2024	0.29
When Maddi scores a huge DJ gig for James Kennedy, she jumps at the opportunity and leaves her position at Republic open for Emmy to step in and prove herself as acting VIP Manager; as Mia's dating life heats up, Grace and Liam's love turns cold.
14	6	"Cat's Out of the Bag"	January 18, 2024	0.32
Joe questions where to take his relationship with Salley after TJ's revelations. Grace reconsiders her future with Liam and plans the perfect escape to save her cat. As Maddi scrambles to save her job from Emmy, new cheating evidence against her boyfriend Trevor spreads through Charleston.
15	7	"A Match Made in Miami"	January 25, 2024	0.31
Still reeling from her co-workers meddling in her relationship, Maddi brushes off attempts to reconcile with Emmy; Mikel comes clean to Bradley about a rumour from the past; things between Bradley and Lucía get hot and heavy.
16	8	"Hurricane Maddi"	February 1, 2024	0.25
The group continues to live it up in Miami with DJ gigs, water sports and yacht parties, but things take a turn when a secret group chat is exposed; friends become foes when a fun reflection turns into everyone airing their grievances about Maddi.
17	9	"Circus Act"	February 8, 2024	0.27
Maddi shares a surprise voice recording with Joe; Emmy receives some unexpected news; Leva brings the circus to town for one night.
18	10	"A Fare-Will Party"	February 15, 2024	0.26
Emmy succeeds in her new role; Joe starts to spiral; Will departs for law school; Maddi as she comes face-to-face with someone from Trevor's past.
19	11	"Reunion"	February 22, 2024	0.25
Joe Bradley plays coy about what happened back at the hotel after he got cozy with Luann, claiming he was "not" guilty of anything; coverage of all the break-ups and make-ups.

=== Season 3 (2025) ===
No. overall	No. in season	Title	Original release date	U.S. viewers (millions)
20	1	"Bottles, Balloons and Betrayal"	January 2, 2025	0.33
Maddi finds unexpected romance in an old pal; Charleston is once again filled with rumours as Will gets real about his feelings for Emmy; as everyone hits the pool to celebrate Michols' birthday, Joe confronts TJ over betraying his trust.
21	2	"Cash or Store Credit"	January 9, 2025	0.29
Joe walks back rumours TJ's been spreading as gossip about Will runs rampant; Maddi and Grace hit the studio; Michols moves forward in his love life; Brad and Molly have different approaches to Emmy's meltdown at Republic.
22	3	"Wylin at Lake Wylie"	January 16, 2025	0.29
Joe cozies up to Maddi's parents; TJ follows up on unfinished business; Will catches up with old friends, who dig up old beefs; Lake shows the gang how she got her name and her family dime; Emmy attempts to repair relationships.
23	4	"A Lake House Divided"	January 23, 2025	0.36
As Michols builds the courage to confess his secret to Emmy, Lake gets an unexpected visitor at her lake house; Joe attempts to rebuild his friendship with TJ; Brad and Lake continue to play games with one another.
24	5	"No Call, Low Blow"	January 30, 2025	0.37
Joe and TJ heal old wounds; A stroll down King Street leads to chaos at Republic; TJ's Sir Wieners gets a huge endorsement; Joe reveals his fears about Maddi's DJ career.
25	6	"Viva Las Vegas!"	February 6, 2025	0.34
Just as a new rumour about Will cheating drops in Charleston, everyone jets off to support Maddi at her big DJ gig in Las Vegas. After Brad leaves Lake in the friend zone, he starts to get second thoughts. A surprise guest drops in.
26	7	"Not Pretty in Sin City"	February 13, 2025	0.31
After Brad can't help falling in love, Austin confronts Will; Joe's rattled that Grace put herself before Maddi; one lucky couple decides if it's now or never at a wedding chapel off the Vegas strip.
27	8	"Wieners and Losers"	February 20, 2025	0.33
TJ's anxiety mounts as he tries to impress Leva by hosting a Sir Wieners Launch at Republic; Lake introduces an old flame, which opens new wounds; while Emmy and Will have a moment of peace, Joe and Maddi's honeymoon phase faces some challenges.
28	9	"Honeymoon Is Over"	February 27, 2025	0.30
Joe and Maddi's disagreements at home bleed into work; Michols confides in his stepdad; Lake makes some tough choices; Emmy invites the gang to prom; TJ takes matters into his own hands when he realizes Will is lying.
29	10	"Guilty Until Proven Innocent"	March 6, 2025	0.35
Everyone dances their way to Prom Night, but TJ and Brad's search for the truth about Will impacts everything, including their friendships; Austin finds out that gossiping has consequences; Grace Lilly's prom date shocks everyone.
30	11	"Reunion"	March 6, 2025	0.28

=== Season 4 (2026) ===
No. overall	No. in season	Title	Original release date	U.S. viewers (millions)
31	1	"Wiener Wars"	March 4, 2026	0.27
32	2	"Folly Follies"	March 11, 2026	0.26
33	3	"An Olive Branch, Served Dirty"	March 18, 2026	0.25
34	4	"Giving Grace"	March 25, 2026	0.25
35	5	"Float Around and Find Out"	April 1, 2026	0.30
36	6	"Ruckus on the River"	April 8, 2026	0.31
37	7	"Sip Happens"	April 15, 2026	0.23
38	8	"My Chemical Bromance"	April 22, 2026	0.27
39	9	"Sun's Out, Shade's Out"	April 29, 2026	0.27
40	10	"You Can't Go to Church with Us"	May 6, 2026	0.26
41	11	"This Beach Is Crazy"	May 13, 2026	0.26
42	12	"Big Gay Explosion"	May 20, 2026	0.25
43	13	"Mardi Gras Mayhem"	May 27, 2026	0.34
44	14	"Reunion Part 1"	June 3, 2026	0.28
45	15	"Reunion Part 2"	June 10, 2026	0.27

== Reception ==
Writing for Common Sense Media, reviewer Melissa Camacho said, "While the overall series will remind you of unscripted shows like Vanderpump Rules, Southern Hospitality remains true to its roots by attempting to contextualize all of this within Southern culture and community, a few of which border on stereotypes about women, clothes, and attitudes. Folks who aren't drawn to this type of entertainment won't find much here. Meanwhile, if you're a fan of the franchise, you'll find the series to be a bit of a departure from its predecessors."
