= Whitney Sudler-Smith =

American film director

- Born: June 2, 1968 (age 58); Washington, D.C., U.S.
- Other name: Whitney Smith
- Occupations: Film and television director
- Years active: 1996–present
- Television: Southern Charm; Southern Charm Savannah; Southern Charm New Orleans
- Mother: Patricia Altschul
- Relatives: Nick Loeb (cousin)

Whitney Sudler-Smith (born June 2, 1968) is an American filmmaker, television director, and a classically trained guitarist. He is the creator, executive producer, and main cast member of Bravo's Southern Charm, a reality docu-series following the lives of socialites in Charleston, South Carolina. He was an executive producer on the Savannah and New Orleans spin-off shows.

== Early life ==
Sudler-Smith was born June 2, 1968, in Washington, D.C., however he grew up in Virginia. His mother is Patricia Altschul (then Pat Dey-Smith), a socialite. He graduated from Georgetown Day School and George Washington University. He studied at Oxford University and the Alliance Française in Paris. His late father, Lon Hayes Smith, was a former head of Dun & Bradstreet and a senior vice president at Morgan Stanley. Sudler-Smith is cousins with businessman and actor Nick Loeb.

== Career ==
In 1996, Sudler-Smith directed two indie films Going for Baroque and Afternoon Delight. In 1998, he released an indie film Bubba and Ike, a "redneck buddy comedy" starring Jesse Borrego and Elisa Gabrielli, which was first screened at the Austin Film Festival. In 2002, Sudler-Smith wrote and directed Torture TV, a television pilot starring Danny Huston and Trevor Goddard.

In 2010, he directed the documentary Ultrasuede: In Search of Halston about fashion designer Roy Halston. The film, which premiered at the Tribeca Film Festival, was met with negative reviews and has a rating of 33% on review aggregating site Rotten Tomatoes.

Sudler-Smith is the creator and executive producer of Southern Charm, a reality show on Bravo which chronicles the social life of Charleston, South Carolina. He was the executive producer of two spin-off series, Southern Charm Savannah and Southern Charm New Orleans. While neither show was officially cancelled, they have not aired since 2018 and 2019, respectively.

In 2022, it was announced that Sudler-Smith would co-produce a docuseries created by Penny Lane about the Mrs. America beauty pageant. The series, titled Mrs. America, premiered its first two episodes at the Tribeca Festival in 2025.

Sudler-Smith is in pre-production on the scripted comedy series Family Office. Sudler-Smith is set to write and direct the comedic thriller film New Rose, which will film in spring 2026. He has also teased a new digital series starring Southern Charm cast member Shep Rose.

== Personal life ==
Sudler-Smith's mother, Patricia Altschul, is the widow of Arthur Goodhart Altschul Sr., a prominent New York art collector and philanthropist who was a longtime general partner of Goldman Sachs. He splits his time between a home in Los Angeles, California, and the Isaac Jenkins Mikell House in Charleston, South Carolina, where he lives with his mother. He previously lived in New York.

Sudler-Smith is the only Southern Charm cast member to stay in contact with Thomas Ravenel after Ravenel's assault and battery charges.

== Filmography ==
=== Film ===
Year	Show	Notes
1998	Bubba and Ike	Director, writer
2002	Torture TV	Director, writer
2010	Ultrasuede: In Search of Halston	Director, writer

=== Television ===
Year	Show	Notes
2000	Dark Realm	Writer
2002	Toture TV	Director, writer
2014–present	Southern Charm	Creator, executive producer, cast member
2017	Southern Charm Savannah	Creator, executive producer
2018	Southern Charm New Orleans	Executive producer
2025	Mrs. America	Executive producer
