= Peter's Point Plantation =

Historic house in South Carolina, United States

- Peters Point Plantation
- U.S. National Register of Historic Places
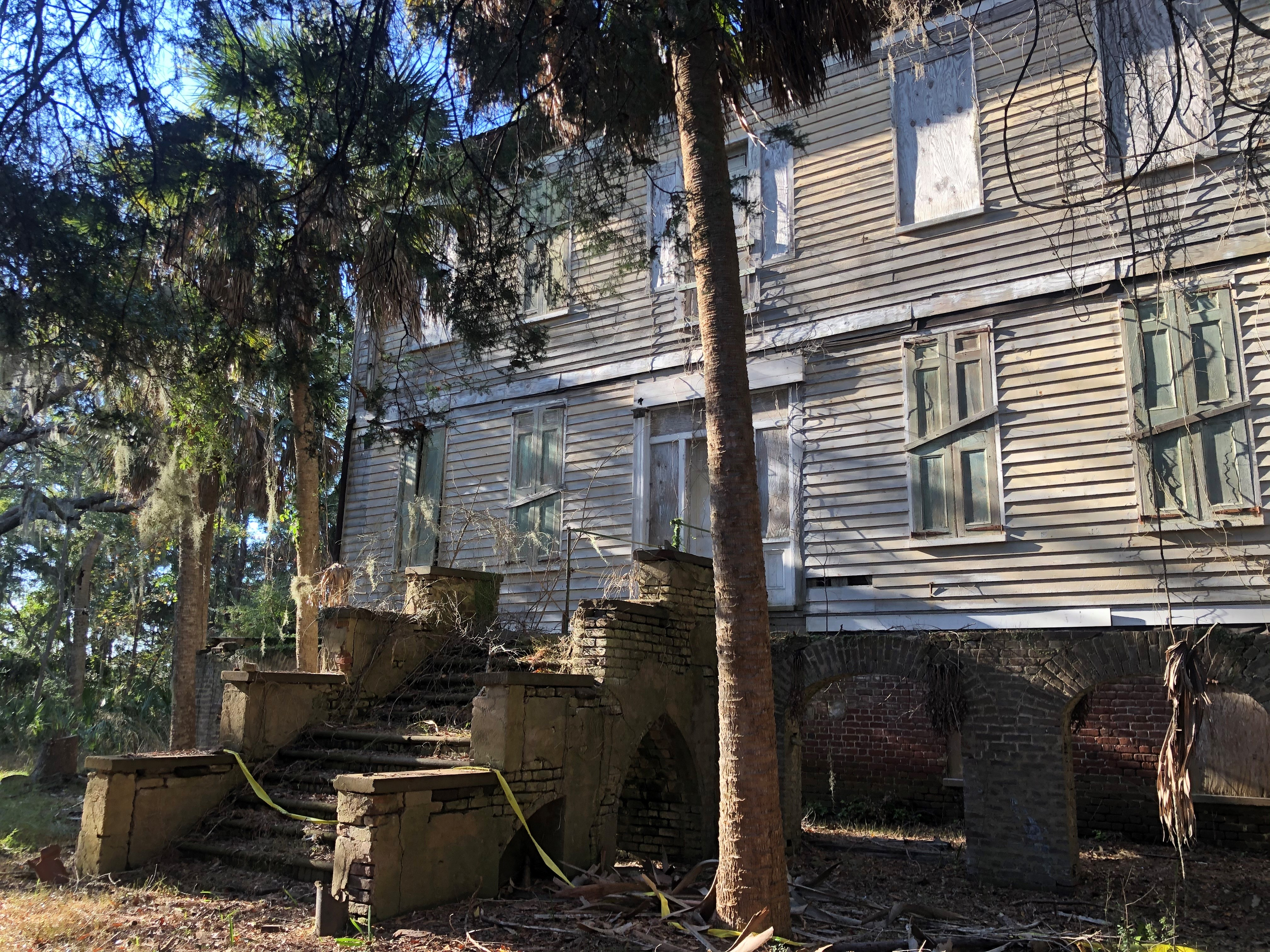

- Location within South Carolina
- Location: 9084 Peters Point Road, Edisto Island, South Carolina
- Coordinates: 32°32′19″N 80°20′22″W
- Built: 1840
- Architectural style: Greek Revival
- NRHP reference No.: 73001699

Peters Point Plantation is a historic structure located on Edisto Island, South Carolina. It was built by Isaac Jenkins Mikell in 1840 at the intersection of St. Pierre's Creek and Fishing Creek. It is located on the site General Lafayette used as a departure point from Edisto Island in 1826 during his southern tour.

The plantation house displays early Edisto Island plantation and Greek Revival styles. Mikell, a Princeton graduate, was one of the wealthiest planters in the state. He served as a magistrate and commissioner of the public schools of Edisto. The house was listed in the National Register of Historic Places on June 19, 1973.

== History ==
The plantation was one of the world's largest producers of Sea Island Cotton and was as large as 2,200 acres in 1860. It had an estimated yearly ginned cotton production of approximately 70,000 pounds. Isaac Jenkins Mikell inherited the plantation in 1838 and built the plantation home in 1840. The plantation had been owned by the Mikell family since 1715.

The house is sometimes, less frequently known as the Isaac Jenkins Mikell House, but that name is much more commonly applied to the Greek Revival house Mikell built in Charleston in 1853. The house displays early Edisto Island plantation and Greek Revival styles. It reflects "the transitional stage between the functional plantation house of the early 1800s and the grandiose plantation dwellings of the 1850s." One of Mikell's projects was the landscaping of the grounds surrounding the house.

On December 21, 2009, the South Carolina Supreme Court held that a zoning plan created in 2004 that would have allowed up to 55 dwelling units to be built on the same 160-acre tract as Peter's Point Plantation violated Charleston County's master plan. Edisto Island Open Land Trust now owns a conservation easement on the Peter's Point property.

== See also ==
- Isaac Jenkins Mikell House
