= Isaac Jenkins Mikell House =

Historic house in South Carolina, United States

- Issac Jenkins Mikell House
- U.S. National Register of Historic Places
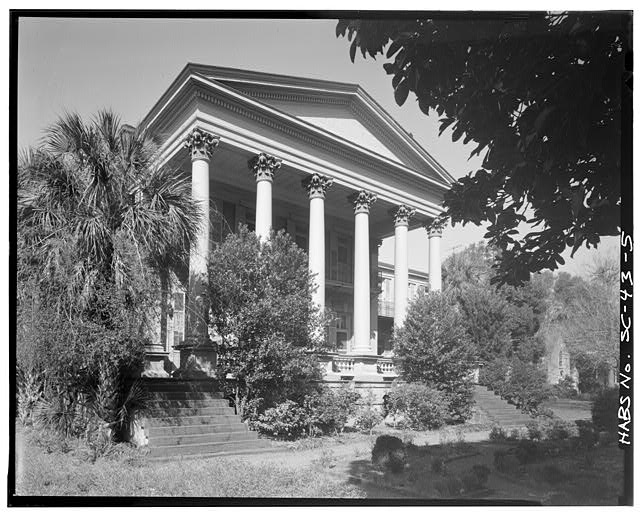
- Issac Jenkins Mikell House

- Location within South Carolina Location within the United States
- Location: 94 Rutledge Ave., Charleston, South Carolina
- Coordinates: 32°46′51.0672″N 79°56′31.6896″W
- Area: less than one acre
- Built: 1853–1854
- Architectural style: Roman Revival
- NRHP reference No.: 14000056
- Added to NRHP: March 11, 2014

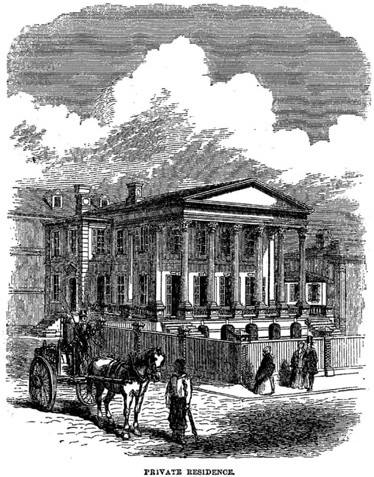
The Isaac Jenkins Mikell House was shown in an engraving in a June 1857 issue of Harper's Magazine.

The Isaac Jenkins Mikell House is an imposing Roman Revival residence in the style of a grand Italian villa that was built in 1853–1854 by Edisto Island cotton planter and enslaver Isaac Jenkins Mikell for his wife, Mary Martha Pope. The house should not be confused with Peter's Point Plantation, an Edisto Island plantation built in about 1840 by Isaac Jenkins Mikell which is also sometimes referred to as the Isaac Jenkins Mikell House.

The southern facade (overlooking Montagu Street) is dominated by a pedimented portico with six columns with composite capitals carved from cypress and ornamented with rams' heads. In addition to the main house, there is a kitchen building and a separate coach house on the premises. A 1939 photograph shows the slave quarters.

The house was bought in 1935 by the Charleston Free Library and served as a public library until the early 1960s, when it was sold and restored as a private residence. In 2008, the house sold for $4.8 million to Manhattan socialite Patricia Altschul. The house is frequently featured on the Bravo television reality show, Southern Charm; Altschul is the mother of one of the program's regular cast, filmmaker Whitney Sudler-Smith, who is also executive producer of the show. The house was listed on the National Register of Historic Places in 2014.

== See also ==
- Peter's Point Plantation, same owner
