= Patricia Altschul =

Southern socialite

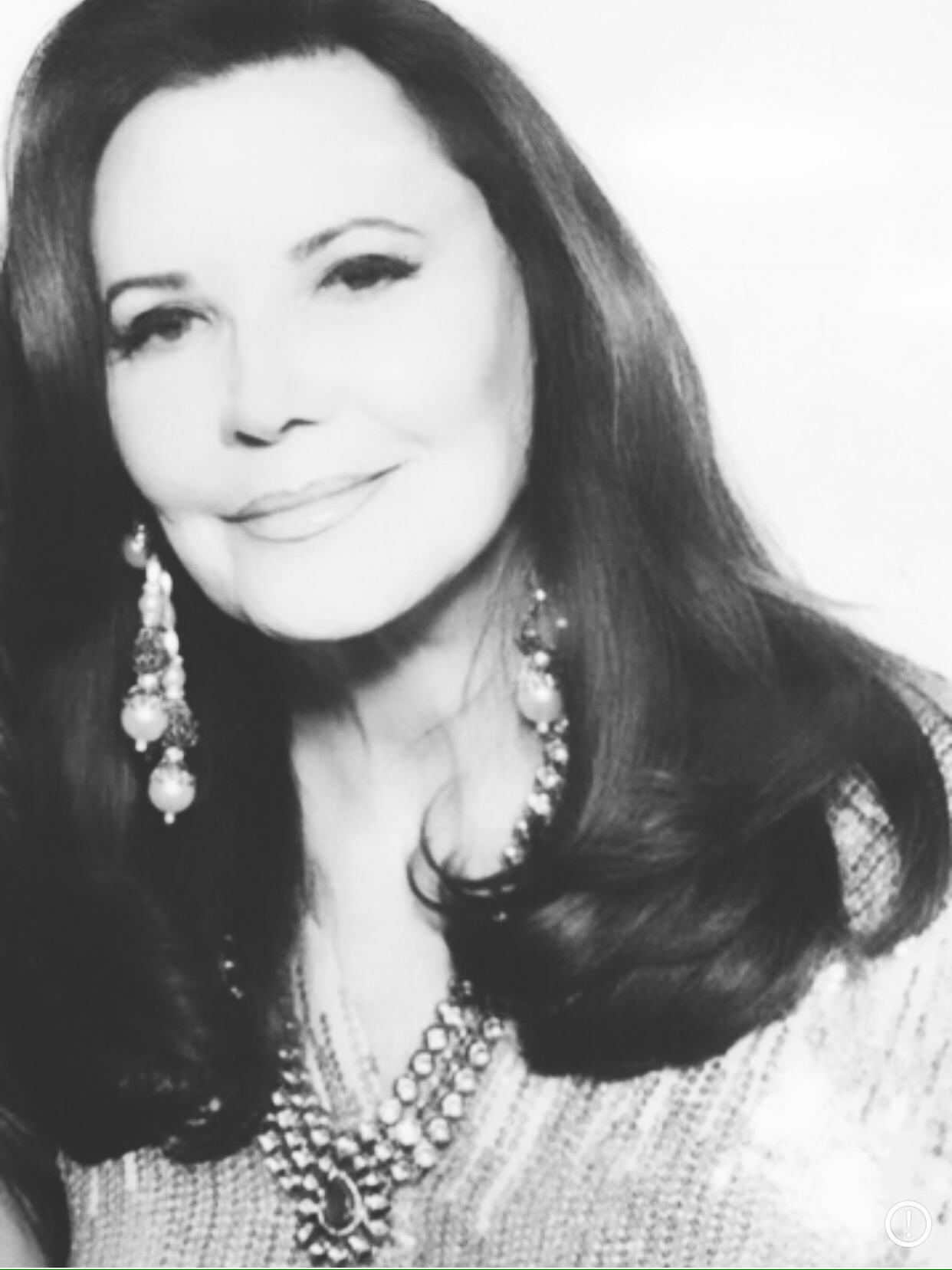
- Self-portrait of Altschul
- Born: Patricia Madelyn Dey; April 16, 1941 (age 85); Jacksonville, Florida
- Education: George Washington University
- Occupations: Socialite, television personality, former art dealer
- Years active: 1965–present
- Spouses: L. Hayes Smith (m. 1962; div. 1979) Edward Stitt Fleming (m. 1989; div. 1995) Arthur Altschul (m. 1996; died 2002)
- Children: Whitney Sudler-Smith (b. 1968)

Patricia Altschul (born April 16, 1941) is an American socialite, art collector, and personality on the reality television series, Southern Charm. She is the widow of Arthur G. Altschul, a former Goldman Sachs partner and prominent art collector and philanthropist. Mrs. Altschul was an Honorary Trustee of the New York Historical Society and a Board Member of Historic Hudson Valley (the Rockefeller Family properties). In 2012, Altschul was given a Woman of the Year award for philanthropy by the Police Athletic League of New York City. In 2013, she received a Carolopolis Award from the Preservation Society of Charleston for her renovation of the historic Isaac Jenkins Mikell House in Charleston, SC.

On Southern Charm, Patricia plays “the resident madcap grande dame” according to a profile in Architectural Digest. "Pat quickly became a fan favorite last year and has even drawn the affection of celebrities like Lady Gaga who claimed 'that looking at Patricia is like looking in a mirror,'" commented TV critic Christine Lo in her blog.

== Early life and career ==
Patricia Altschul was born Patricia Madelyn Dey in Jacksonville, Florida in 1941 and grew up in Richmond, Virginia. Her parents were Frances Pearl Sudler Dey and Walter Pettus Dey, a medical doctor who graduated from the University of Alabama and received a medical degree from Tulane University in 1909. Her grandfather, Frank Dey, born in Newark, New Jersey of Dutch descent, served in the Confederate Army during the American Civil War. Patricia was educated at Marymount School, Olney Friends School, and George Washington University, where she obtained a bachelor's degree magna cum laude in 1964 and then a master's degree in 1965, both in art history and archaeology. She started as an instructor and later became an assistant professor in art history at George Washington University. She lived for many years in Georgetown, where she later owned and ran Arcadia, a private art dealership that handled major paintings by such artists as Georgia O'Keeffe, Martin Johnson Heade, Frederick Church, and Winslow Homer.

Altschul wrote and published the book The Art of Southern Charm in 2017.

In 2020, Altschul launched The Patricia Altschul Luxury Collection on the Home Shopping Network.

== Marriages and social life ==
In 1962, Patricia married L. Hayes Smith. The couple lived in Falls Church and McLean, Virginia. Their son, film maker and television producer Whitney Sudler-Smith, was born in 1968 in Washington, D.C. They were divorced in 1979.

Patricia married the doctor and entrepreneur Edward Stitt Fleming in 1989. In 1995, the couple divorced amicably. Dr. Fleming was a longtime Washington psychiatrist who founded the Psychiatric Institute of Washington and the Psychiatric Institutes of America. He was president and chief executive of Psychiatric Institutes of America, a private provider of inpatient psychiatric care, which he started in 1969 and sold in 1983.

In 1996, she married Arthur Goodhart Altschul, a general partner in the investment banking firm of Goldman, Sachs & Company from 1959 to 1977 and later a limited partner. He was also one of the founders of General American Investors. Altschul was a prominent art collector, especially of paintings by Neoimpressionist, Pointillist, Nabis, and Ashcan School artists. The Yale University Art Gallery organized a major exhibition of art from the collection. Altschul was Chairman of the board at Barnard College and a member of the boards at the Metropolitan Museum of Art, Whitney Museum of American Art, National Gallery of Art, and the Smithsonian Institution. His Overbrook Foundation had assets of more than $150 million. Arthur Altschul died in 2002.

While Patricia was married to Altschul, the couple were inveterate party-goers. After the attack on the World Trade Center, a New York Times reporter wrote an article about whether people should attend parties such as the upcoming gala for New Yorkers For Children, given the tragedy of 9/11. She interviewed Patricia and wrote:

"'People were saying, 'Should I go, is it right?'" said Patricia Altschul, wife of the philanthropist and investor Arthur Altschul. She had thought about wearing black ("It seems more sober"), but decided on a pale green silk suit, embroidered with flowers, by Oscar de la Renta. "Yes, I was going to wear black, but at some point you have to get back to life," Mrs. Altschul said. "I think the Mayor [Rudy Giuliani] gave everyone permission to be out with their friends."

Altschul's prominence (and donations) helped her to be named to the Board of the New York Historical Society and the Rockefeller family Hudson Hills Trust. She was described by novelist Jay McInerney in New York Magazine as being one of New York's “Big Girls” – “the wives (and widows and heiresses) who are the keepers of the benefit circuit.” The Altschuls were frequently seen with other society types such as Melania and Donald Trump and Patricia's friends Georgette Mosbacher, Deeda Blair, and Carolyn Roehm, former wife of Henry Kravis and a designer in Manhattan.

In 1997, Arthur and Patricia Altschul bought the 15-room Long Island estate "Southerly" overlooking Oyster Bay from Ambassador Hushang & Maryam Ansary. They hired Mario Buatta to redecorate. "The view is sensational and magical: you can see the water from every room in the house," Mrs. Altschul later told The New York Times.

After Arthur's death, Patricia decided to put "Southerly" up for sale and move back to the South. Reporter M.J. Smith commented in The New York Times about the house that, "While the allusions to F. Scott Fitzgerald and Jazz Age parties may be trite, it is hard not to think of them when it comes to Southerly, a 10,000-square-foot Long Island estate that is now on the market for $15.8 million."

== Renovation of Mikell House ==
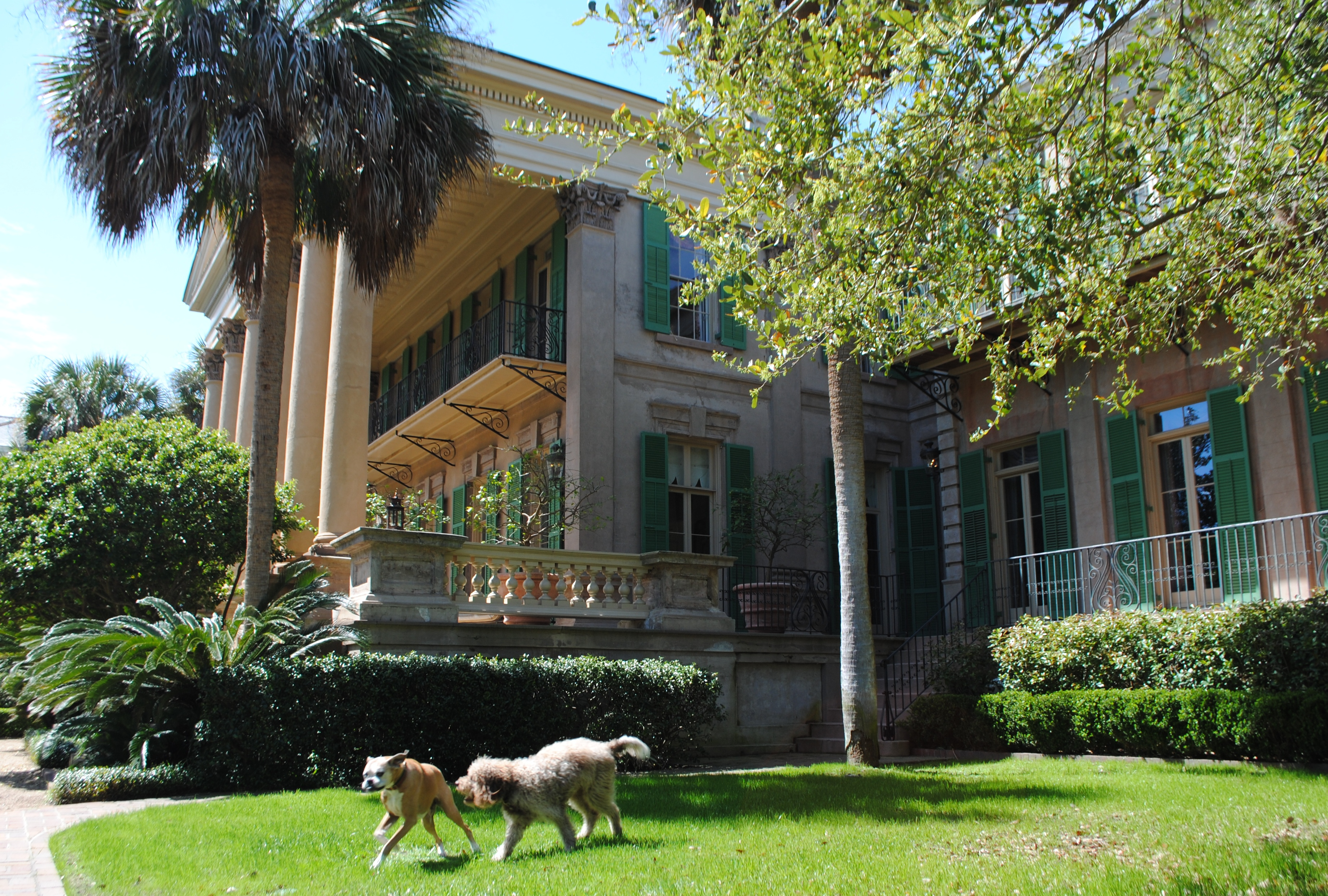
The historic 1854 Isaac Jenkins Mikell House after the renovation (in 2015)

In 2008, Altschul decided to leave New York for Charleston. She purchased the historic Isaac Jenkins Mikell House, an imposing 1854 Greek Revival residence noted for its pedimented portico with six large columns having capitals ornamented with rams’ heads. The house was formerly the Charleston Free Library and served as a public library until the early 1960s when it reverted to a private residence. Altschul was said to have paid over $4.8 million for the house and spent over $5 million renovating it. The New York Post noted that it has "a picturesque piazza and 18th-century French toilets."

In 2013, the Preservation Society of Charleston gave Altschul a Pro Merito Award/Carolopolis Award for her renovation of the house, and it was listed on the National Register of Historic Places in 2014.

In addition to the main house, there is a kitchen building and separate coach house on the Mikell House premises.

== Involvement with Southern Charm ==
When Altschul's son, producer Whitney Sudler-Smith, decided to create a reality TV show about life in Charleston, he urged his mother to participate. In Southern Charm, Patricia plays "the resident madcap grande dame," according to Architectural Digest. She is a "straight shooter with a serious pedigree and a ton of clout to throw around . . . famous for her no-nonsense advice, wicked tongue, and appreciation for a high quality cocktail," says blogger and TV critic Christine Lo. She provides sometimes snarky comments about the misdeeds of younger cast members.

Patricia said she hasn't lost any sleep over how she'll be portrayed. “I frankly don’t care,” she says. “I always say exactly what I think and they can do what they want. I just don’t want them putting up any ugly pictures of me.”
