= Southern Charm =

- Genre: Reality
- Created by: Bryan Kestner; Whitney Sudler-Smith
- Starring: Craig Conover; Cameran Wimberly; Jenna King; Thomas Ravenel; Shep Rose; Whitney Sudler-Smith; Landon Clements; Kathryn Dennis; Austen Kroll; Chelsea Meissner; Eliza Limehouse; Naomie Olindo; Leva Bonaparte; Madison LeCroy; John Pringle; Venita Aspen; Olivia Flowers; Taylor Ann Green; Chleb Ravenell; Rod Razavi; Rodrigo Reyes; Jarrett Thomas; Ryan Albert; Salley Carson; Molly O'Connell; Charley Manley; Whitner Slagsvol; Allie Newman
- Theme music composer: Mia Sable
- Opening theme: "It's Easy"
- Country of origin: United States
- Original language: English
- No. of seasons: 11
- No. of episodes: 164 (list of episodes)

Production
- Executive producers: Aaron Rothman; Irad Eyal; Whitney Sudler-Smith; Bryan Kestner; Jason Weinberg; Jessica Chesler; Morgan Miller
- Camera setup: Multiple
- Running time: 42 minutes
- Production company: Haymaker Productions

Original release
- Network: Bravo
- Release: March 3, 2014 – present

Related
- Southern Charm Savannah; Southern Charm New Orleans; Southern Hospitality

Southern Charm is an American reality television series that premiered on Bravo on March 3, 2014. The series chronicles the personal and professional lives of several socialites who reside in Charleston, South Carolina.

The show focuses on the Southern culture, along with the political history of the area, and has featured local historical places including Lewisfield Plantation and Mikell House.

== Production ==
=== Season 1 ===
Southern Charm was first announced by Bravo on January 14, 2014. The original cast consisted of Craig Conover, Cameran Eubanks, Jenna King, Thomas Ravenel, Shep Rose, and Whitney Sudler-Smith. The season premiered on March 3, 2014, and finished on May 5, 2014. The reunion was taped on April 24, 2014.

=== Season 2 ===
On July 14, 2014, Southern Charm was renewed for a second season, which premiered on March 16, 2015. The season aired until May 25, 2015. Jenna King did not return. The second season featured Craig Conover, Shep Rose, Cameran Wimberly, Thomas Ravenel, and Whitney Sudler-Smith all returning, with Kathryn Calhoun Dennis and Landon Clements joining the main cast. The reunion was taped on May 19, 2015.

=== Season 3 ===
The third season aired from April 4, 2016, to July 5, 2016. All cast members returned from the previous season. The reunion was taped on June 14, 2016.

=== Season 4 ===
The fourth season was announced on February 16, 2017, and premiered on April 3. It aired until July 17, 2017. Sudler-Smith left the main cast after season three and was featured in a recurring capacity in following seasons. Conover, Rose, Wimberly, Ravenel, Dennis and Clements all returned for season four, with Austen Kroll being added to the main cast. Chelsea Meissner was a recurring cast member. The reunion was taped on June 20, 2017.

=== Season 5 ===
In February 2018, Bravo announced the fifth season. The season aired from April 5, 2018, to July 30, 2018. Clements did not return, and Chelsea Meissner was promoted to the main cast for season five. In August 2018, Ravenel announced his departure from the show after five seasons due to sexual assault allegations against him, as well as claiming that the show "took advantage of him." Bravo confirmed his departure in September 2018 after Ravenel was arrested and charged with assault and battery. The reunion was taped on June 12, 2018.

=== Season 6 ===
The sixth season aired from May 15, 2019, to August 28, 2019. Wimberly, Rose, Conover, Dennis, Kroll, and Meissner all returned, Naomie Olindo and Eliza Limehouse were added to the main cast.

=== Season 7 ===
Season seven was announced on September 24, 2020, and premiered on October 29, 2020. Filming started early 2020 and paused in the spring due to the COVID-19 pandemic. Filming wrapped July 2020. In May 2020, it was confirmed that Cameran Eubanks, Naomie Olindo, and Chelsea Meissner would not be returning to the show for the seventh season. In August 2020, Eliza Limehouse confirmed that she too was departing the series ahead of season seven. Leva Bonaparte, Madison LeCroy, and John Pringle were introduced as series regulars, joining Conover, Rose, Dennis, and Kroll in the main cast. In October 2020, Thomas Ravenel revealed that he filmed a scene with Kathryn Dennis. The reunion was taped on December 10, 2020.

=== Season 8 ===
Season 8 premiered on June 23, 2022 and aired until October 13, 2022. Olivia Flowers, Venita Aspen, Chleb Ravenell and Taylor Ann Green joined Conover, Rose, Dennis, Kroll, Bonaparte, and Olindo as part of the main cast. Madison LeCroy and John Pringle were reduced to recurring roles, while Marcie Hobbs was introduced as a friend of the cast. Filming for the season wrapped in December 2021, and the trailer dropped on May 16, 2022. The reunion was taped on September 13, 2022.

=== Season 9 ===
In August 2023, it was announced that the ninth season of the show would premiere on September 14, 2023. The season finished airing on January 18, 2024. Conover, Rose, Kroll, Bonaparte, Aspen, Flowers and Green all returned along with LeCroy who was upgraded back to a full time role. Rod Razavi and Jarrett Thomas joined as new main cast members. Rodrigo Reyes joined as a friend of the group. Dennis and Olindo did not return. The reunion was taped on December 7, 2023.

=== Season 10 ===
In October 2024, it was announced that the tenth season would premiere on December 5, 2024. The season finished airing on April 3, 2025. Conover, Rose, Kroll, Bonaparte, Aspen, Green, LeCroy, and Thomas all returned, alongside new main cast members Ryan Albert, Salley Carson and Molly O’Connell joining the cast. Rodrigo Reyes was upgraded to main cast member. Flowers and Razavi were not asked back to return for the tenth season. In November 2024, Thomas exited the series after two seasons, saying that he would cease filming the series immediately. However, Thomas did attend the reunion taping on February 6, 2025. In March 2025, Bonaparte announced she would be departing the series after four seasons. The following month, Green confirmed that she would also be exiting the series following the conclusion of the tenth season. On May 7, 2025, the series was renewed for an eleventh season.

=== Season 11 ===
In October 2025, it was announced that the eleventh season would premiere on November 19, 2025. Conover, Rose, Kroll, Aspen, LeCroy, Reyes, Carson, and O’Connell all returned, alongside new cast members Charley Manley and Whitner Slagsvol joining the main cast. The reunion was taped on February 4, 2026. On May 11, 2026, the series was renewed for a twelfth season.

=== Season 12 ===
In October 2026, it was announced that the twelfth season would premiere on November 12, 2026. Conover, Rose, Kroll, Aspen, LeCroy, Reyes, Carson, O'Connell, and Slagsvol returned. Allie Newman joined the series as a new main cast member. Taylor Ann Green is set to make appearances, alongside Charley Manley.

== Cast ==
=== Timeline of cast members ===
Main cast members
Cast member	Seasons											
Cast member	1	2	3	4	5	6	7	8	9	10	11	12
Craig Conover	Main	Main	Main	Main	Main	Main	Main	Main	Main	Main	Main	Main
Shep Rose	Main	Main	Main	Main	Main	Main	Main	Main	Main	Main	Main	Main
Cameran Wimberly	Main	Main	Main	Main	Main	Main						
Thomas Ravenel	Main	Main	Main	Main	Main		Guest					
Whitney Sudler-Smith	Main	Main	Main	Friend	Friend	Friend	Friend	Friend	Friend	Friend	Friend	Friend
Jenna King	Main											
Kathryn Dennis	Friend	Main	Main	Main	Main	Main	Main	Main				
Landon Clements		Main	Main	Main								
Austen Kroll				Main	Main	Main	Main	Main	Main	Main	Main	Main
Chelsea Meissner				Friend	Main	Main						
Naomie Olindo			Friend	Friend	Friend	Main		Main				
Eliza Limehouse				Guest		Main						
Leva Bonaparte	Guest	Guest	Guest	Guest	Guest	Guest	Main	Main	Main	Main	Guest	
Madison LeCroy		Guest	Guest			Friend	Main	Friend	Main	Main	Main	Main
John Pringle							Main	Friend				
Chleb Ravenell							Guest	Main				
Venita Aspen							Friend	Main	Main	Main	Main	Main
Taylor Ann Green							Friend	Main	Main	Main		Guest
Olivia Flowers								Main	Main			
Rod Razavi									Main			
Jarrett "JT" Thomas									Main	Main		
Rodrigo Reyes	Guest		Guest						Friend	Main	Main	Main
Ryan Albert										Main	Guest	
Salley Carson										Main	Main	Main
Molly O’Connell						Guest				Main	Main	Main
Charley Manley											Main	Friend
Whitner Slagsvol											Main	Main
Allie Newman												Main
Recurring cast members
Patricia Altschul	Friend	Friend	Friend	Friend	Friend	Friend	Friend	Friend	Friend	Friend	Friend	Friend
Danni Baird	Friend	Friend	Friend	Friend	Friend	Friend	Friend					
John "J.D." Madison	Friend	Friend	Friend	Friend	Guest							
K. Cooper Ray		Friend	Friend									
Jennifer Snowden		Guest	Friend	Friend	Guest							
Ashley Jacobs					Friend	Guest						
Marcie Hobbs						Guest		Friend				

== Episodes ==
Season	Episodes	Originally released	
Season	Episodes	First released	Last released
1	10	March 3, 2014	May 5, 2014
2	12	March 16, 2015	May 25, 2015
3	14	April 4, 2016	July 5, 2016
4	15	April 3, 2017	July 17, 2017
5	16	April 5, 2018	July 30, 2018
6	16	May 15, 2019	August 28, 2019
7	13	October 29, 2020	February 11, 2021
8	17	June 23, 2022	October 13, 2022
9	17	September 14, 2023	January 18, 2024
10	17	December 5, 2024	April 3, 2025
11	17	November 19, 2025	March 25, 2026

== Spin-offs ==
On October 27, 2016, Bravo ordered a spin-off series to Southern Charm, titled Southern Charm Savannah. The series follows the same premise as its predecessor series but is set in Savannah, Georgia. The series is produced by Haymaker Production and Aaron Rothman, Irad Eyal, Sara Nichols, Luke Neslage and Jessica Chesler, Jason Weinberg, Bryan Kestner and Whitney Sudler-Smith serve as the series' executive producers. The series premiered on May 8, 2017.

In April 2017, Bravo announced it was ordering two spin-offs, Southern Charm New Orleans and RelationShep. RelationShep premiered on December 4, 2017, and followed the Southern Charm cast member as he looked for love. Southern Charm New Orleans premiered on April 15, 2018 and its second season premiered on June 2, 2019.

In February 2021, main castmembers Craig Conover and Austen Kroll were involved in a joint spin-off of Southern Charm and Summer House titled Winter House, in which Conover and Kroll join stars of Summer House for a trip to Stowe, Vermont. A preview of the spin-off aired after the fifth-season finale of Summer House in April 2021, and it premiered in October 2021. Conover and Kroll returned for the second season of Winter House, which premiered on October 13, 2022.

In May 2022, Bravo ordered a spin-off starring main cast member Leva Bonaparte titled Southern Hospitality that follows Bonaparte and the staff of her Charleston nightclub, Republic Garden & Lounge. The series debuted on November 28, 2022.
