= Southern Charm New Orleans =

American television program

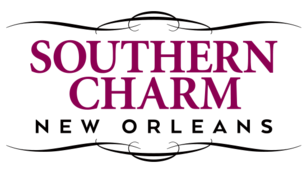
- Genre: Reality television
- Starring: Jeff Charleston; Jon Moody; Reagan Charleston; Justin Reese; Barry Smith; Tamica Lee
- Country of origin: United States
- Original language: English
- No. of seasons: 2
- No. of episodes: 18

Production
- Executive producers: Michaline Babich; Whitney Sudler-Smith; Tim Maloney; Ashley McFarlin Buie; Sergio Alfaro
- Camera setup: Multiple
- Running time: 42 minutes
- Production company: InventTV

Original release
- Network: Bravo
- Release: April 15, 2018 – August 11, 2019

Related
- Southern Charm; Southern Charm Savannah; Southern Hospitality

Southern Charm New Orleans is an American reality television series that premiered on Bravo on April 15, 2018. Developed as the second spin-off of Southern Charm, it aired two seasons.

The series chronicles the personal and professional lives of several socialites who reside in New Orleans, Louisiana.

On April 19, 2019, Bravo announced that the second season would premiere on June 2, 2019.

== Cast members ==
=== Main ===
- Jeff Charleston
- Reagan Charleston
- Tamica Lee
- Jon Moody
- Justin Reese
- Barry Smith

=== Recurring ===
- Rachel McKenzie
- Kelsey Nichols
- Reece Thomas (season 2)

== Episodes ==
=== Series overview ===
Season	Episodes	Originally released	
Season	Episodes	First released	Last released
1	8	April 15, 2018	June 3, 2018
2	10	June 2, 2019	August 11, 2019

=== Season 1 (2018) ===
No. overall	No. in season	Title	Original release date	US viewers (millions)
1	1	"Big Easy, Baby!"	April 15, 2018	1.09
2	2	"Art House Party"	April 22, 2018	0.95
3	3	"50 Shades of Cray"	April 29, 2018	0.76
4	4	"Fredric's Premiere"	May 6, 2018	0.80
5	5	"Booze and Boos"	May 13, 2018	0.72
6	6	"Etoufee-Faced"	May 20, 2018	0.69
7	7	"All About the Bunny Hunnie"	May 27, 2018	0.64
8	8	"Better Late Than Pregnant"	June 3, 2018	0.87

=== Season 2 (2019) ===
No. overall	No. in season	Title	Original release date	US viewers (millions)
9	1	"Back in the Big Easy, Baby!"	June 2, 2019	0.64
10	2	"Jewels and Bad Juju"	June 9, 2019	0.59
11	3	"Nightmare on Bourbon Street"	June 16, 2019	0.69
12	4	"Housewarming Gone Cold"	June 30, 2019	0.56
13	5	"The Runway Runaway"	July 7, 2019	0.61
14	6	"Birthdays and Breaking Down"	July 14, 2019	0.59
15	7	"No Thanks Given"	July 21, 2019	0.71
16	8	"The Big Picture"	July 28, 2019	0.71
17	9	"A Date With Destin-y"	August 4, 2019	0.64
18	10	"Second Time's the Southern Charm"	August 11, 2019	0.68
