= Southern Charm Savannah =

- Genre: Reality
- Created by: Bryan Kestner; Whitney Sudler-Smith
- Starring: Catherine Cooper; Daniel Eichholz; Hannah Pearson; Louis Oswald; Lyle Mackenzie; Hagood Coxe; Brandon Branch
- Country of origin: United States
- Original language: English
- No. of seasons: 2
- No. of episodes: 16

Production
- Executive producers: James Brangert; Luke Neslage; Chaz Morgan; Whitney Sudler-Smith; Bryan Kestner
- Camera setup: Multiple
- Running time: 42 minutes
- Production company: Haymaker Productions

Original release
- Network: Bravo
- Release: May 8, 2017 – September 3, 2018

Related
- Southern Charm; Southern Charm New Orleans; Southern Hospitality

Southern Charm Savannah is an American reality television series that premiered on Bravo on May 8, 2017. Developed as the first spin-off of Southern Charm, it aired two seasons.

The series chronicles the personal and professional lives of several socialites who reside in Savannah, Georgia.

== Production ==
On October 27, 2016, Bravo announced that it would be producing a spin-off series of Southern Charm, titled Southern Charm Savannah. The show premiered on May 8, 2017. The first season finale aired on June 26, 2017.

In 2018, it was announced that the show's second season would premiere in July. The season finale aired on September 3, 2018.

== Cast ==
=== Main ===
- Catherine Cooper
- Daniel Eichholz
- Hannah Pearson
- Louis Oswald
- Lyle Mackenzie
- Ashley Borders (season 1; guest season 2)
- Hagood Coxe (season 2)

=== Recurring ===
- Happy McCullough (season 1)
- Nelson Lewis (season 1)
- Brandon Branch (season 2; guest season 1)

== Episodes ==
=== Series overview ===
| Season | Episodes | Originally released | |
| Season | Episodes | First released | Last released |
|---|---|---|---|
| 1 | 8 | May 8, 2017 | June 26, 2017 |
| 2 | 8 | July 16, 2018 | September 3, 2018 |

=== Season 1 (2017) ===
| No. overall | No. in season | Title | Original release date | US viewers (millions) |
|---|---|---|---|---|
| 1 | 1 | "Welcome to Savannah, Y'all" | May 8, 2017 | N/A |
| 2 | 2 | "Par for the Strip Golf Course" | May 15, 2017 | N/A |
| 3 | 3 | "Boys of Summer" | May 22, 2017 | N/A |
| 4 | 4 | "Hurricane on the Horizon" | May 29, 2017 | N/A |
| 5 | 5 | "The Perfect Storm" | June 5, 2017 | N/A |
| 6 | 6 | "Bridge over Troubled Water" | June 5, 2017 | N/A |
| 7 | 7 | "St. Simone Says" | June 19, 2017 | N/A |
| 8 | 8 | "Engagement Rings & Petty Things" | June 26, 2017 | N/A |

=== Season 2 (2018) ===
| No. overall | No. in season | Title | Original release date | U.S. viewers (millions) |
|---|---|---|---|---|
| 9 | 1 | "Communication Breakdown" | July 16, 2018 | N/A |
| 10 | 2 | "Pearls, Pajamas, and Lies" | July 23, 2018 | N/A |
| 11 | 3 | "Duck, Duck, Goosed" | July 30, 2018 | N/A |
| 12 | 4 | "Duck, Duck, Boom" | August 6, 2018 | N/A |
| 13 | 5 | "Paintballs of Fire" | August 13, 2018 | N/A |
| 14 | 6 | "Sorry, Not Sorry" | August 20, 2018 | N/A |
| 15 | 7 | "Turks and Consequences" | August 27, 2018 | N/A |
| 16 | 8 | "Down to the River to Pray" | September 3, 2018 | N/A |
