= Mia Sable =

American singer-songwriter

Mia Sable is an American actress, voice over artist and singer/songwriter born and raised in Charlotte, North Carolina and currently residing in Los Angeles, California. Sable has opened for well-known artists like Meiko and Sara Bareilles.

== Early life ==
Mia was born in Charlotte, North Carolina, United States. She is of Korean, German, and Native American (Choctaw) ancestry.

In 2002, she was admitted to UCLA's School of Theater, Film and Television for musical theater. During her time at UCLA, Sable wrote for the music section of the college newspaper, The Daily Bruin, before graduating in 2007.

== Career ==
During college, Sable interned at 4th Street Recording Studios in Santa Monica, CA (known for recording Incubus and No Doubt). There, she began recording her first demos with producers Jim Wirt (Fiona Apple, Hoobastank) and Craig Bartock (Heart).

In 2006, Sable founded her own record label, Moduristic Records, and self-released her debut album Propeller, which won the Los Angeles Music Award for "Indie Female Vocalist" that year for the song "My Mistake". She began performing with her band in Los Angeles at venues such as Hotel Café, The Roxy, The Knitting Factory, and on campus at UCLA and USC. In 2007, Sable won another Los Angeles Music Award, this time in the category of "Alternative Female Vocalist" for her song "Secret Code".

Upon graduation from UCLA, Sable toured and performed at venues in London, Nashville, New York, Los Angeles, including SXSW in Austin, NXNE in Toronto, Folk Alliance Conference in Memphis, and Sundance Film Festival in Park City, with an appearance on Park City TV.

At the end of 2008, Sable released X-Mas, a small collection of Christmas songs, and began work on a second album with Roger Greenawalt in Williamsburg, Brooklyn. She finished the album in Los Angeles at 4th Street Recording with Wirt and Bartock, and LIGHT was released in August 2009. Her song "You Should Know" won the 2009 Malibu Music Award for "Adult Contemporary Artist", and the music video was subsequently programmed by FUSE TV On Demand.

Following the release of LIGHT, Sable performed in-stores at Best Buy, Whole Foods, and the Apple Store in Los Angeles. She also played at the 2010 & 2011 NAMM Shows for Martin guitars. Sable has also been recognized for her classic and glamorous personal style, being featured in the Sikara Jewelry blog Real Women, Real Style as well as for the original art direction of her websites. Noteworthy mentions include the unique "tarot card navigation" concept on MiaSable.com in 2009, designed by Jeff Toll, and published in Taschen's Web Design: Navigation, and her MySpace layout designed by Dana Bissett, and mentioned on Mashable.com's 50 Hot MySpace Music Layouts.

In fall of 2009, Sable was admitted on full scholarship via the Consortium for Graduate Study in Management to USC's Top-20 ranked MBA program at the Marshall School of Business to study digital media and entertainment. In the summer of 2010, Sable began recording new material and working on a new concept live production show, "The Mia Sable Supper Club Revue", which debuted October 21, at First & Hope Supper Club's Fedora Music Lounge in downtown Los Angeles. The show held a monthly residence through May 2011, and featured a "playlist" style performance of medleys including Sable's original material interwoven with classic jazz standards as well as versions of several contemporary soul-pop songs. On August 5, 2011, the show was featured at the Levitt Pavilion summer concert series in Pasadena.

In 2012, Sable released a three-song collection called The Portrait Collection EP. The leading track "It's Easy" was chosen as the opening theme song to the 2014 Bravo TV Series Southern Charm. Other notable TV song placements include Lifetime's Dance Moms and TLC's Toddlers & Tiaras.

== Discography ==
- 2006: Propeller
- 2008: The Scenic Route EP
- 2008: X-Mas
- 2009: LIGHT
- 2012: The Portrait Collection EP
