= Jeff Charleston =

American football player (born 1983)

No. 60, 90, 97, 92
- Position: Defensive end

Personal information
- Born: January 19, 1983 (age 43); Oregon City, Oregon, U.S.
- Listed height: 6 ft 4 in (1.93 m)
- Listed weight: 265 lb (120 kg)

Career information
- High school: Central (Independence, Oregon)
- College: Western Oregon (2001–2003); Idaho State (2004–2005)
- NFL draft: 2006: undrafted

Career history
- Houston Texans (2006)*; Indianapolis Colts (2007); New Orleans Saints (2008–2011); Minnesota Vikings (2012)*; Tampa Bay Buccaneers (2012)
- * Offseason or practice squad member only

Awards and highlights
- Super Bowl champion (XLIV); Big Sky co-Defensive Player of the Year (2005); Big Sky Newcomer of the Year (2005); First-team All-Big Sky (2005); 2× All-GNAC (2002, 2003)

Career NFL statistics
- Total tackles: 87
- Sacks: 8
- Forced fumbles: 3
- Fumble recoveries: 1
- Pass deflections: 5
- Stats at Pro Football Reference

Jeffrey David Charleston (born January 19, 1983) is an American former professional football player who was a defensive end in the National Football League (NFL). He was signed by the Houston Texans as an undrafted free agent in 2006. He played college football for the Idaho State Bengals.

Charleston was also a member of the Indianapolis Colts, New Orleans Saints, Minnesota Vikings, and Tampa Bay Buccaneers. Charleston was part of the Super Bowl champion Saints during the 2009–2010 season.

== Early life ==
Charleston attended Central High School in Independence, Oregon. He lettered three years in football and basketball and was first-team all-Oregon pick at tight end and second-team all-state at linebacker.

== College career ==
Charleston played for three seasons at Division II Western Oregon. He was a two-time All-Great Northwest Athletic Conference pick; as a sophomore, he led the team in sacks (4.5), tackles for losses (10.5) and FR (4) and ranked 3rd on team with 69 tackles. He then decided to transfer to Idaho State University for both athletic and academic reasons. He sat out the 2004 season per NCAA transfer regulations, then played one season for Idaho State. As a senior, he registered 12 sacks, and had 56 tackles, five passes defended, two FF and 19 tackles for losses. He was voted Defensive and Newcomer Player-of-the-Year in the Big Sky Conference.

== Professional career ==
Pre-draft measurables
Height	Weight	40-yard dash	20-yard shuttle	Three-cone drill	Vertical jump	Broad jump	Bench press
6 ft 3 7/8 in (1.93 m)	267 lb (121 kg)	4.83 s	4.30 s	7.24 s	34.0 in (0.86 m)	9 ft 4 in (2.84 m)	21 reps
All values from Pro Day

=== Indianapolis Colts ===
Originally signed as an undrafted free agent by Houston on May 4, 2006, he was waived on September 1, 2006. The Colts signed him on January 4, 2007. In 2007, he started three of 13 games at RDE (starting the final three games for injured DE-Robert Mathis) and totaled 42 tackles, 22 solo, one sack, four pressures, one FF and two passes batted. The Colts waived him in August 2008.

=== New Orleans Saints ===
Charleston was signed by the Saints for the 2008 season. He played in 10 games in 2008. In the 2009 season, Charleson played in 19 games, tallying 23 tackles. On January 2, 2011, Charleston recovered a fumble of Buccaneers quarterback Josh Freeman when he was hit by Charleston.

=== Minnesota Vikings ===
On June 28, 2012, Charleston was signed by the Minnesota Vikings. On August 31, as the Vikings reduced their roster down to league maximum of 53 players, he was released.

=== Tampa Bay Buccaneers ===
The Tampa Bay Buccaneers signed him on September 26, 2012. On October 2, 2012, he was released.

== Personal life ==
Charleston married Reagan (née Tucker) in 2012. They appeared together on Southern Charm New Orleans. In May 2018, the couple announced they were separating and they divorced later that year.

In October 2019, Charleston married his girlfriend Maddie.
