= Hayu (streaming service) =

Video streaming service

- Website type: OTT platform
- Headquarters: London, United Kingdom
- Area served: Albania; Andorra; Armenia; Australia; Austria; Belgium; Bosnia and Herzegovina; Bulgaria; Canada; Croatia; Cyprus; Denmark; Estonia; Finland; France; Germany; Greece; Hong Kong; Hungary; Iceland; Ireland; Italy; Kosovo; Latvia; Lithuania; Luxembourg; Malta; Montenegro; Netherlands; New Zealand; North Macedonia; Norway; Philippines; Poland; Portugal; Romania; Serbia; Singapore; Slovakia; Slovenia; Spain; Sweden; Switzerland; Turkey; United Kingdom
- Owner: NBCUniversal
- Services: Video on demand
- Parent: Comcast
- Website: hayu.com
- Registration: Monthly subscription required to access content
- Launched: 1 March 2016; 10 years ago
- Current status: Active

Hayu (pronounced /ˈheɪjuː/ HAY-yoo) is an American-owned over-the-top subscription video on-demand streaming television service, introduced in 2016.

It is a British subscription service operated by a United Kingdom-based subsidiary of U.S. media company NBCUniversal, a division of Comcast, and primarily features content from NBCUniversal's American media properties.

== Overview ==
From NBCUniversal, Hayu markets itself as an all-reality subscription video-on-demand streaming service offering every episode and every season of a broad selection of reality TV franchises, available the same day as the USA. The majority of Hayu’s content premieres on NBCU and Versant’s US channels: Bravo, E! and Oxygen.

Hayu is available in 45 markets (outside the US) including: Albania, Andorra, Australia, Austria, Belgium, Bosnia, Bulgaria, Canada, Croatia, Cyprus, Czech Republic, Denmark, Estonia, Finland, France, Germany, Greece, Hong Kong, Hungary, Iceland, Ireland, Italy, Kosovo, Latvia, Lithuania, Luxembourg, Malta, Montenegro, the Netherlands, New Zealand, North Macedonia, Norway, the Philippines, Poland, Portugal, Romania, Serbia, Singapore, Slovakia, Slovenia, Spain, Sweden, Switzerland, Turkey and the United Kingdom on a full array of devices (mobile, tablet, laptop, connected TVs and selected consoles) at www.Hayu.com.

In July 2024, NBCUniversal expanded Hayu to ITV’s premium streaming service in the UK, ITVX. In September 2024, NBCUniversal expanded Hayu to M6 Group's premium streaming service in France, M6+.

On 26 October 2024, Hayu announced The Real Housewives of London as its first-ever commission of an original series. The series premiered exclusively on the service in August 2025. In July 2026, Hayu announced a Canadian installment of Summer House, the series' first international adaptation, set to premiere in 2027.

== Original programming ==
- The Real Housewives of London (2025–present)
- Summer House Canada (2027–)

== Acquired programming ==
- Bad Girls Club
- Below Deck
- Below Deck Adventure
- Below Deck Down Under
- Below Deck Mediterranean
- Below Deck Sailing Yacht
- Botched
- Euros of Hollywood
- Game of Crowns
- In the City
- Jerseylicious
- Keeping up with the Kardashians
- Ladies of London
- Married to Medicine
- The McBee Dynasty: Real American Cowboys
- Million Dollar Listing
- Model Squad
- Next Gen NYC
- Real Girlfriends in Paris
- The Real Housewives
- The Real Housewives Ultimate Girls Trip
- Rich Kids of Beverly Hills
- Snapped
- Snapped: Killer Couples
- Southern Charm
- Southern Hospitality
- Top Chef
- The Valley
- The Valley: Persian Style
- Vanderpump Rules
- Southern Charm
- Summer House
- WAGS
- Watch What Happens Live with Andy Cohen
- Wife Swap: The Real Housewives Edition
- Winter House
