= List of Below Deck Mediterranean episodes =

Below Deck Mediterranean is an American reality television series that premiered on May 3, 2016, on Bravo. The show is the first spin-off of Below Deck. Similar to the original, the show chronicles the lives of the crew members who work and reside aboard a superyacht during charter season. It shows the crew as they deal with their personal issues in order to make their professional careers work. Most seasons end with a special dedicated reunion episode of Watch What Happens Live! with Andy Cohen, in which the cast members discuss the events of the season.

== Overview ==
| Season | Episodes | Originally released | |
| Season | Episodes | First released | Last released |
|---|---|---|---|
| 1 | 13 | May 3, 2016 | July 26, 2016 |
| 2 | 15 | May 2, 2017 | August 15, 2017 |
| 3 | 17 | May 15, 2018 | September 11, 2018 |
| 4 | 18 | June 3, 2019 | September 30, 2019 |
| 5 | 22 | June 1, 2020 | October 26, 2020 |
| 6 | 18 | June 28, 2021 | October 18, 2021 |
| 7 | 20 | July 11, 2022 | November 22, 2022 |
| 8 | 16 | September 25, 2023 | January 22, 2024 |
| 9 | 17 | June 3, 2024 | September 23, 2024 |
| 10 | 18 | September 29, 2025 | January 26, 2026 |
| 11 | 18 | June 8, 2026 | October 5, 2026 |

== Episodes ==
=== Season 1 (2016) ===
| No. overall | No. in season | Title | Original release date | U.S. viewers (millions) |
|---|---|---|---|---|
| 1 | 1 | "It's All Greek to Me" | May 3, 2016 | 1.04 |
| 2 | 2 | "Game Time" | May 10, 2016 | 0.71 |
| 3 | 3 | "Model Deckhands" | May 17, 2016 | 0.93 |
| 4 | 4 | "Lovesick Danny" | May 24, 2016 | 0.88 |
| 5 | 5 | "My Big Fat Greek Threesome" | May 31, 2016 | 1.19 |
| 6 | 6 | "Entrée-vous" | June 7, 2016 | 1.01 |
| 7 | 7 | "Who's Got Game" | June 14, 2016 | 1.08 |
| 8 | 8 | "Charter King" | June 21, 2016 | 1.06 |
| 9 | 9 | "Fever Pitch" | June 28, 2016 | 1.16 |
| 10 | 10 | "Charter from Heaven, Charter from Hell?" | July 5, 2016 | 1.38 |
| 11 | 11 | "They Hate Us Cuz They Ain't Us" | July 12, 2016 | 1.30 |
| 12 | 12 | "The Beautiful Thing About Subpar" | July 19, 2016 | 1.41 |
| 13 | 13 | "That Was Very Greek Of Us" | July 26, 2016 | 1.31 |

=== Season 2 (2017) ===
| No. overall | No. in season | Title | Original release date | U.S. viewers (millions) |
|---|---|---|---|---|
| 14 | 1 | "Who's The Boss?" | May 2, 2017 | 0.91 |
| 15 | 2 | "Three's Company" | May 9, 2017 | 1.03 |
| 16 | 3 | "Chefs, Lies and Facetime" | May 16, 2017 | 1.09 |
| 17 | 4 | "All Chained Up and No Place To Go" | May 23, 2017 | 0.88 |
| 18 | 5 | "Double Trouble" | May 30, 2017 | 1.16 |
| 19 | 6 | "Don't Cry Over Cut Onions" | June 6, 2017 | 1.14 |
| 20 | 7 | "Mo' onions, mo' problems" | June 13, 2017 | 1.25 |
| 21 | 8 | "Flirting with Disaster" | June 20, 2017 | 1.26 |
| 22 | 9 | "iCloudy with a Chance of Secrets" | June 27, 2017 | 1.13 |
| 23 | 10 | "Kissing Up" | July 11, 2017 | 1.23 |
| 24 | 11 | "The Dubrovnik Wedgie" | July 18, 2017 | 1.35 |
| 25 | 12 | "Swing Shift" | July 25, 2017 | 1.48 |
| 26 | 13 | "Stew the Right Thing" | August 1, 2017 | 1.39 |
| 27 | 14 | "Con-text is Everything" | August 8, 2017 | 1.45 |
| 28 | 15 | "Reunion" | August 15, 2017 | 1.16 |

=== Season 3 (2018) ===
| No. overall | No. in season | Title | Original release date | U.S. viewers (millions) |
|---|---|---|---|---|
| 29 | 1 | "Ciao, Napoli!" | May 15, 2018 | 1.25 |
| 30 | 2 | "A Perfect Storm" | May 22, 2018 | 1.26 |
| 31 | 3 | "Bad Vibrations" | May 29, 2018 | 1.36 |
| 32 | 4 | "Demand & Supply" | June 5, 2018 | 1.31 |
| 33 | 5 | "Can I Get Fries with That?" | June 12, 2018 | 1.43 |
| 34 | 6 | "Hasta Barista, Baby!" | June 19, 2018 | 1.52 |
| 35 | 7 | "Walking on Broken Glass" | June 26, 2018 | 1.53 |
| 36 | 8 | "Bizarre Love Triangle" | July 10, 2018 | 1.30 |
| 37 | 9 | "Panic at the Deck-o" | July 17, 2018 | 1.31 |
| 38 | 10 | "Hannah, Hannah, Sandy?" | July 24, 2018 | 1.44 |
| 39 | 11 | "Mo' Euros, Mo' Problems" | July 31, 2018 | 1.63 |
| 40 | 12 | "Take This Job and Stew It" | August 7, 2018 | 1.44 |
| 41 | 13 | "We Used to Be Friends" | August 14, 2018 | 1.49 |
| 42 | 14 | "Stew Coup" | August 21, 2018 | 1.40 |
| 43 | 15 | "One Million Percent" | August 28, 2018 | 1.39 |
| 44 | 16 | "Definitely Not Prague" | September 4, 2018 | 1.30 |
| 45 | 17 | "Reunion" | September 11, 2018 | 1.28 |
Shown on Watch What Happens Live! with Andy Cohen

=== Season 4 (2019) ===
| No. overall | No. in season | Title | Original release date | U.S. viewers (millions) |
|---|---|---|---|---|
| 46 | 1 | "Pardon Your French" | June 3, 2019 | 1.18 |
| 47 | 2 | "Recipe for Disaster" | June 10, 2019 | 1.43 |
| 48 | 3 | "Cannes You Cook?" | June 17, 2019 | 1.70 |
| 49 | 4 | "Too Many Cooks in the Kitchen" | June 24, 2019 | 1.62 |
| 50 | 5 | "99 Problems but a Chef Ain't One" | July 1, 2019 | 1.65 |
| 51 | 6 | "Knot Today, Anchors" | July 8, 2019 | 1.65 |
| 52 | 7 | "All Hail the Queen" | July 15, 2019 | 1.61 |
| 53 | 8 | "What Eze the Problem?" | July 22, 2019 | 1.56 |
| 54 | 9 | "A Whole Different Ball Game" | July 29, 2019 | 1.59 |
| 55 | 10 | "Docked and Loaded" | August 5, 2019 | 1.66 |
| 56 | 11 | "Monte Car-Loco" | August 12, 2019 | 1.66 |
| 57 | 12 | "Don’t Cry for Me, Sirocco" | August 19, 2019 | 1.55 |
| 58 | 13 | "It's Ben A Long Time" | August 26, 2019 | 1.71 |
| 59 | 14 | "Nauti Girls Need Love Too" | September 2, 2019 | 1.61 |
| 60 | 15 | "Holy Ship!" | September 9, 2019 | 1.64 |
| 61 | 16 | "Sweet White Glove o’ Mine" | September 16, 2019 | 1.51 |
| 62 | 17 | "Love, Love Me Stew" | September 23, 2019 | 1.52 |
| 63 | 18 | "Au Revoir, Sirocco" | September 30, 2019 | 1.58 |

=== Season 5 (2020) ===
| No. overall | No. in season | Title | Original release date | U.S. viewers (millions) |
|---|---|---|---|---|
| 64 | 1 | "I Like Big Boats and I Cannot Lie" | June 1, 2020 | 1.51 |
| 65 | 2 | "Can't Touch This" | June 8, 2020 | 1.52 |
| 66 | 3 | "The Italian's Job" | June 15, 2020 | 1.73 |
| 67 | 4 | "Ace of Stew Face" | June 22, 2020 | 1.73 |
| 68 | 5 | "Bringing the Thunder" | June 29, 2020 | 1.59 |
| 69 | 6 | "Oh Snap" | July 6, 2020 | 1.67 |
| 70 | 7 | "No Mushroom for Error" | July 13, 2020 | 1.69 |
| 71 | 8 | "Rise and Don't Shine" | July 20, 2020 | 1.60 |
| 72 | 9 | "Viva, Loss Vegas" | July 27, 2020 | 1.68 |
| 73 | 10 | "Closing Time" | August 3, 2020 | 1.71 |
| 74 | 11 | "Cabin Fever" | August 10, 2020 | 1.73 |
The crew enjoys a day off at a beach club in Mallorca.
| 75 | 12 | "There's No Place Like Home" | August 17, 2020 | 1.87 |
| 76 | 13 | "Welcome Back" | August 24, 2020 | 1.74 |
| 77 | 14 | "Whole New Ballgame" | August 31, 2020 | 1.77 |
| 78 | 15 | "Shot Through the Heart, and Ibiza's to Blame" | September 7, 2020 | 1.72 |
| 79 | 16 | "Cool as a Cucumber" | September 14, 2020 | 1.56 |
| 80 | 17 | "Something's Fishy" | September 21, 2020 | 1.66 |
| 81 | 18 | "A Real Handful" | September 28, 2020 | 1.60 |
| 82 | 19 | "The Bali Is In Your Court" | October 5, 2020 | 1.49 |
| 83 | 20 | "A Mighty Wind" | October 12, 2020 | 1.62 |
| 84 | 21 | "Reunion Part 1" | October 19, 2020 | 1.25 |
Shown on Watch What Happens Live! with Andy Cohen
| 85 | 22 | "Reunion Part 2" | October 26, 2020 | 1.14 |
Shown on Watch What Happens Live! with Andy Cohen

=== Season 6 (2021) ===
| No. overall | No. in season | Title | Original release date (Note: Episodes of season 6 were released on streaming service Peacock seven days prior to airing on Bravo) | U.S. viewers (millions) |
|---|---|---|---|---|
| 86 | 1 | "A Yacht in Kneed" | June 28, 2021 | 1.14 |
| 87 | 2 | "It's Not Easy Being Green" | July 5, 2021 | 1.16 |
| 88 | 3 | "It's Like Rain On Your Wedding Day" | July 12, 2021 | 1.29 |
| 89 | 4 | "Love At First Night" | July 19, 2021 | 1.18 |
| 90 | 5 | "Ship Happens" | July 26, 2021 | 1.10 |
| 91 | 6 | "The Morning After" | August 2, 2021 | 1.26 |
| 92 | 7 | "Can’t Fight This Feeling" | August 9, 2021 | 1.11 |
| 93 | 8 | "At Your Lack of Service" | August 16, 2021 | 1.22 |
| 94 | 9 | "Brews, Stews & Management Blues" | August 23, 2021 | 1.20 |
| 95 | 10 | "Burning Down the House" | August 30, 2021 | 1.19 |
| 96 | 11 | "Should I Stay or Should I Go" | September 6, 2021 | 0.94 |
| 97 | 12 | "Don't Go Chasing Waterfalls" | September 13, 2021 | 0.97 |
| 98 | 13 | "A Hard Day's Night" | September 20, 2021 | 1.03 |
| 99 | 14 | "All I Need is a Miracle" | September 27, 2021 | 1.00 |
| 100 | 15 | "Three's a Crowd" | October 4, 2021 | 1.01 |
| 101 | 16 | "Sleepless in Croatia" | October 11, 2021 | 1.08 |
| 102 | 17 | "Nothing Comes Over Easy" | October 18, 2021 | 1.09 |
| 103 | 18 | "WWHL Reunion" | October 18, 2021 | 0.783 |
Andy Cohen sits down virtually with the "Below Deck Med" crew to discuss all the departures, workplace drama and romance this season.

=== Season 7 (2022) ===
| No. overall | No. in season | Title | Original release date | U.S. viewers (millions) |
|---|---|---|---|---|
| 104 | 1 | "There's No Place Like Home" | July 11, 2022 | 1.00 |
Captain Sandy kicks off another charter season in the Mediterranean, this time on the exclusive island of Malta aboard the sleek and ultra-modern motor yacht, Home.
| 105 | 2 | "I've Got a Sea-cret" | July 18, 2022 | 0.98 |
| 106 | 3 | "A Whole Yacht of Scandal" | July 25, 2022 | 0.94 |
| 107 | 4 | "Skeletons in the Cabin" | August 1, 2022 | 1.08 |
| 108 | 5 | "Break-Ups and Shake-Ups" | August 8, 2022 | 1.12 |
| 109 | 6 | "Walkie of Shame" | August 15, 2022 | 1.00 |
| 110 | 7 | "For Tooth's Sake" | August 22, 2022 | 0.91 |
| 111 | 8 | "Wine Im-pairing" | August 29, 2022 | 0.89 |
| 112 | 9 | "Lets Me Be Frank" | September 5, 2022 | 0.84 |
| 113 | 10 | "Finding the Groove" | September 12, 2022 | 0.74 |
| 114 | 11 | "The Bold and the Betrayal" | September 19, 2022 | 0.89 |
| 115 | 12 | "We Just Don't Clique" | September 26, 2022 | 0.74 |
| 116 | 13 | "Charter of Destiny" | October 3, 2022 | 0.80 |
| 117 | 14 | "In a Bind" | October 10, 2022 | 0.76 |
| 118 | 15 | "Brace for Impact" | October 17, 2022 | 0.84 |
| 119 | 16 | "Clash Landing" | October 24, 2022 | 0.85 |
| 120 | 17 | "The Fall Guy" | October 31, 2022 | 0.80 |
| 121 | 18 | "Stuck in the Griddle with You" | November 7, 2022 | 0.69 |
| 122 | 19 | "Let's Bring It Home" | November 14, 2022 | 0.69 |
| 123 | 20 | "WWHL Reunion" | November 22, 2022 | 0.65 |
The cast and crew get together to sit down with Andy Cohen to reflect on the highs and lows of their time below deck.

=== Season 8 (2023–2024) ===
| No. overall | No. in season | Title | Original release date | U.S. viewers (millions) |
|---|---|---|---|---|
| 124 | 1 | "The Italian Job" | September 25, 2023 | 0.69 |
Captain Sandy struggles with crew issues when starting a new charter season on the Italian Riviera.
| 125 | 2 | "Two Many Cooks" | October 2, 2023 | 0.83 |
| 126 | 3 | "We've Only Just Begun" | October 9, 2023 | 0.88 |
| 127 | 4 | "Take It to the Bridge" | October 16, 2023 | 0.85 |
| 128 | 5 | "Max Tension" | October 23, 2023 | 0.75 |
| 129 | 6 | "Pirate's Booty Call" | October 30, 2023 | 0.89 |
The crew orchestrate an intricate pirate-themed day for charter guests; the bosun's composure wavers during a tense docking.
| 130 | 7 | "Tightly Unwound" | November 6, 2023 | 0.74 |
| 131 | 8 | "Who Needs Frenemies" | November 13, 2023 | 0.78 |
| 132 | 9 | "Ciao for Now" | November 20, 2023 | 0.78 |
| 133 | 10 | "Dirty Laundry" | November 27, 2023 | 0.89 |
| 134 | 11 | "Safety Dance" | December 4, 2023 | 0.82 |
| 135 | 12 | "Sink or Swim" | December 11, 2023 | 0.83 |
| 136 | 13 | "High Steaks" | December 18, 2023 | 0.72 |
| 137 | 14 | "Caught Read Handed" | January 8, 2024 | 0.76 |
| 138 | 15 | "Curb Your Stewsiasm" | January 15, 2024 | 0.61 |
| 139 | 16 | "Guess Who's Coming to Dinner" | January 22, 2024 | 0.88 |

=== Season 9 (2024) ===
| No. overall | No. in season | Title | Original release date | U.S. viewers (millions) |
|---|---|---|---|---|
| 140 | 1 | "My Big Fat Greek Yacht Emergency" | June 3, 2024 | 0.89 |
| 141 | 2 | "Sneak, Sip, and Sink" | June 10, 2024 | 0.89 |
| 142 | 3 | "Drifting Standards" | June 17, 2024 | 0.74 |
| 143 | 4 | "Greeking Havoc" | June 24, 2024 | 0.74 |
| 144 | 5 | "Caught Between a Dock and a Heart Place" | July 1, 2024 | 0.79 |
| 145 | 6 | "Running Aft-er Time" | July 8, 2024 | 0.82 |
| 146 | 7 | "Chain Reaction" | July 15, 2024 | 0.71 |
| 147 | 8 | "Dirty Laundry" | July 22, 2024 | 0.78 |
| 148 | 9 | "This Boat's Not Big Enough for the Stew of Us" | July 29, 2024 | 0.64 |
| 149 | 10 | "Regret Me Knot" | August 5, 2024 | 0.67 |
| 150 | 11 | "From Cloud Nine to Flatline" | August 12, 2024 | 0.77 |
| 151 | 12 | "The Perfect Storm" | August 19, 2024 | 0.73 |
| 152 | 13 | "Chef Woes and Cabin Blows" | August 26, 2024 | 0.86 |
| 153 | 14 | "New Kid on the Dock" | September 2, 2024 | 0.81 |
| 154 | 15 | "Fourth Stew's a Charm" | September 9, 2024 | 0.70 |
| 155 | 16 | "Chain of Command-ment" | September 16, 2024 | 0.69 |
| 156 | 17 | "Happily Ever Aft" | September 23, 2024 | 0.80 |

=== Season 10 (2025–2026) ===
| No. overall | No. in season | Title | Original release date | U.S. viewers (millions) |
|---|---|---|---|---|
| 157 | 1 | "Raising the Bar-celona" | September 29, 2025 | 0.59 |
| 158 | 2 | "Stingled Out" | October 6, 2025 | 0.72 |
| 159 | 3 | "Excess Baggage" | October 13, 2025 | 0.71 |
| 160 | 4 | "Tough Divisions" | October 20, 2025 | 0.57 |
| 161 | 5 | "Let the Games Vegan" | October 27, 2025 | 0.56 |
| 162 | 6 | "The Tempest" | November 3, 2025 | 0.75 |
| 163 | 7 | "Le Vie en Bros" | November 10, 2025 | 0.67 |
| 164 | 8 | "French Kiss" | November 17, 2025 | 0.64 |
| 165 | 9 | "This Is Un-Peasant" | November 24, 2025 | 0.61 |
| 166 | 10 | "Bowing Out" | December 1, 2025 | 0.58 |
| 167 | 11 | "Crossing Lines" | December 8, 2025 | 0.65 |
| 168 | 12 | "The Forbidden Kiss" | December 15, 2025 | 0.59 |
| 169 | 13 | "The Poo-petrator" | December 22, 2025 | 0.59 |
| 170 | 14 | "Guilt Trip" | December 29, 2025 | 0.53 |
| 171 | 15 | "Break-Ups and Shake-Ups" | January 5, 2026 | 0.37 |
| 172 | 16 | "Stricken Nuggets" | January 12, 2026 | 0.62 |
| 173 | 17 | "Bubble Trouble" | January 19, 2026 | 0.58 |
| 174 | 18 | "Baby Steps" | January 26, 2026 | 0.85 |

=== Season 11 (2026) ===
| No. overall | No. in season | Title | Original release date | U.S. viewers (millions) |
|---|---|---|---|---|
| 175 | 1 | "King's Crash Landing" | June 8, 2026 | 0.74 |
| 176 | 2 | "Water Over the Bridge" | June 15, 2026 | 0.75 |
| 177 | 3 | "Guestzilla on Board" | June 22, 2026 | 0.87 |
| 178 | 4 | "Infrared-Colored Glasses" | June 29, 2026 | 0.92 |
| 179 | 5 | "The Deckhand Cometh" | July 6, 2026 | 0.79 |
| 180 | 6 | "Bad Seamanship" | July 13, 2026 | 0.84 |
| 181 | 7 | "Match Me If You Can" | July 20, 2026 | 0.99 |
| 182 | 8 | "He Came, They Saw, It's Bonkers" | July 27, 2026 | 0.85 |
| 183 | 9 | "Out with the Old, In with the Stew" | August 3, 2026 | 0.96 |
| 184 | 10 | "Crazy, Stewpid, Love" | August 10, 2026 | 0.90 |
| 185 | 11 | "Eiffel Power" | August 17, 2026 | N/A |
| 186 | 12 | "Blasts from the Past" | August 24, 2026 | 0.88 |
| 187 | 13 | "Deck Daddy's Home" | August 31, 2026 | TBD |
| 188 | 14 | "Getting Ciggy with It" | September 7, 2026 | TBD |
| 189 | 15 | "Chips on the Shoulders" | September 14, 2026 | TBD |
| 190 | 16 | "The Babysitter's Club" | September 21, 2026 | TBD |
| 191 | 17 | "Money Can Buy Me Love" | September 28, 2026 | TBD |
| 192 | 18 | "Tick, Tick, Boom" | October 5, 2026 | TBD |
