= Below Deck Down Under =

American reality television series

- Genre: Reality
- Created by: Mark Cronin; Rebecca Taylor Henning; Doug Henning
- Country of origin: United States
- Original language: English
- No. of seasons: 4
- No. of episodes: 70

Production
- Executive producers: Mark Cronin; Nadine Rajabi; Courtland Cox; Zachary Klein; Cristina Lopez; Christian Sarabia; Tania Hamidi; Jill Goslicky
- Camera setup: Multiple
- Running time: 43–54 minutes
- Production company: 51 Minds Entertainment

Original release
- Network: Peacock (season 1); Bravo (season 2–present)
- Release: March 17, 2022 – present

Related
- Below Deck; Below Deck Mediterranean; Below Deck Sailing Yacht; Below Deck Adventure

Below Deck Down Under is an American reality television series that premiered on Peacock on March 17, 2022. The show is the third spin-off of Below Deck, following Below Deck Mediterranean and Below Deck Sailing Yacht. Announced in February 2022, the series chronicles the lives of the crew members who work and reside aboard a 150-foot-plus superyacht during a six week charter season in Australia (seasons 1 and 2) and Africa (season 3). Aesha Scott, the chief stew featured in the first two seasons, previously appeared on Below Deck Mediterranean. Captain Jason Chambers made Australian headlines in 2019 after an accident where he crashed a superyacht into a wharf in Queensland. In May 2023, it was announced that the series would be permanently moving from Peacock to Bravo for its second season. The fourth season began airing on February 2, 2026.

In May 2026, the series was renewed for a fifth season.

== Yacht ==
=== Specifications ===
Specifications from Yacht Charter Fleet
Season	Yachts	Model	Built	Refitted	Built By	Length	Cruising Speed
Season 1	"Thalassa" (aka Keri Lee III [ex. Katharine])	Custom	2001	2016	Trinity Yachts (U.S.A)	55.17 m (181 ft)	12.5 Knots
Season 2	"Northern Sun"	Conversion	1976	2007	Narasaki Shipyard	50.9 m (167 ft)	10 Knots
Season 3–4	"Katina"	Custom	2015	2017	Brodosplit	60 m (196 ft 10 in)	12 Knots

== Cast ==
=== Season 1: Thalassa (Whitsunday Islands) ===
First aired: March 17, 2022

- Jason Chambers – Captain
- Ryan McKeown – Chef (ep 1–14)
- Nate Post – Chef (ep 14–17)
- Aesha Scott – Chief Stew
- Tumi Mhlongo – 2nd Stew
- Magda Ziomek – 3rd Stew (ep 1–14)
- Taylor Dennison – 3rd Stew (ep 14–17)
- Jamie Sayed – Bosun
- Culver Bradbury – Deckhand
- Brittini Burton – Deckhand
- Ben "Benny" Crawley – Deckhand

=== Season 2: Northern Sun (Cairns) ===
First aired: July 17, 2023

- Jason Chambers – Captain
- Tzarina Mace-Ralph – Chef
- Aesha Scott – Chief Stew
- Laura Bileskaline – 2nd Stew (ep 1–7)
- Jaimee Neale – 2nd Stew (ep 9–18)
- Margot Sisson – 3rd Stew (ep 2–18)
- Luke Jones – Bosun (ep 1–7)
- João Franco – 2nd Officer/Bosun (ep 8–18)
- Culver Bradbury – Deckhand (ep 3–18), Interim Bosun (ep 7)
- Luka Brunton – Lead Deckhand (ep 13–18)
- Harry Van Vliet – Deckhand
- Adam Kodra – Deckhand (ep 1–13)

=== Season 3: Katina (Seychelles) ===
First aired: February 3, 2025

- Jason Chambers – Captain
- Tzarina Mace-Ralph – Chef
- Anthony Bird – Sous Chef (ep 1–4)
- Alesia Harris – Sous Chef (ep 6–17)
- Lara Rigby – Chief Stew
- Brianna Duffield – Stew (ep 1–15), 3rd Stew (ep 15–17)
- Marina Marcondes de Barros – Stew (ep 1–15), 2nd Stew (ep 15–17)
- Wihan du Toit – Bosun (ep 1–11)
- Nate Salmon – Bosun (ep 11–17)
- Harry van Vliet – Deckhand (ep 1–12), Lead Deckhand (ep 12–17)
- Johnny Arvanitis – Deckhand (ep 1–11)
- Adair Werley – Deck/Stew
- Nicolas "Nic" Cattelan – Deckhand (ep 11–17)

=== Season 4: Katina (Canouan) ===
First aired: February 2, 2026

- Jason Chambers – Captain
- Ben Robinson – Head Chef
- Alesia Harris – Sous Chef (ep 1–3), Stew (ep 3–18)
- Elena "Ellie" Dubaich – Galley Hand (ep 3–18)
- Daisy Kelliher – Chief Stew
- Jenna Woudberg – 2nd Stew (ep 1–16, 18), Stew (ep 16–18)
- Joe Caron – Stew (ep 1)
- Barbara "Barbie" Pascual – Stew (ep 15–18)
- Mike Durrant – Deck/Stew (ep 1–14)
- João Franco – 2nd Officer
- Eddy Hounsell – Deckhand
- Betul Yazici – Deckhand

=== Timeline ===
Cast member	Seasons			
Cast member	1	2	3	4
Culver Bradbury	Deckhand (Note: Bradbury returned in season 2, episode 3, as a replacement deckhand; he also serves as interim Bosun during season 2, episode 7.)	Deckhand		
Brittini Burton	Deckhand			
Jason Chambers	Captain	Captain	Captain	Captain
Ben "Benny" Crawley	Deckhand			
Taylor Dennison	3rd Stew (Note: Dennison appears in episodes 14–17, replacing Ziomek.)			
Ryan McKeown	Chef (Note: McKeown appears in episodes 1–14, before being let go for his job performance.)			
Tumi Mhlongo	2nd Stew			
Nate Post	Chef (Note: Post appears in episodes 14–17, replacing McKeown.)			
Jamie Sayed	Bosun			
Aesha Scott	Chief Stew	Chief Stew		
Magda Ziomek	3rd Stew (Note: Ziomek appears in episodes 1–14, before being let go for her job performance.)			
Laura Bileskaline		2nd Stew (Note: Bileskaline appears in episodes 1–7, before being let go for her general disregard for personal boundaries and lack of respect for her co-workers.)		
Luka Brunton		Lead Deckhand (Note: Luka joined the boat to help add some more experience to the deck team, replacing Kodra in episode 13. Luka already was friends with chief stew Aesha Scott before joining. He also had a previous relationship with season one stew Magda Ziomek.)		
João Franco		2nd Officer/Bosun (Note: Franco, who previously appeared on Below Deck Mediterranean, appears in episode 8 onwards, replacing Jones.)		2nd Officer
Luke Jones		Bosun (Note: Jones appears in episodes 1–7, before being let go for sexual misconduct towards a fellow crew member.)		
Adam Kodra		Deckhand (Note: Kodra appears in episodes 1–13, before being let go for his inexperience on super yachts.)		
Tzarina Mace-Ralph		Chef	Chef	
Jaimee Neale		2nd Stew (Note: Neale appears in episode 9 onwards, replacing Bileskaline.)		
Margot Sisson		3rd Stew (Note: Sisson first appears in episode 2, having been on a different charter at the start of production of season 2.)		
Harry Van Vliet		Deckhand	Deckhand/Lead Deckhand (Note: Vliet is promoted to Lead Deckhand in season 3 episode 12.)	
Johnny Arvanitis			Deckhand (Note: Arvanitis appears in episodes 1–11, before being let go due to aggressive behavior.)	
Anthony Bird			Sous Chef (Note: Bird appears in episodes 1–4, before being let go/quits the yacht due to dissatisfaction with the job.)	
Brianna Duffield			Stew/3rd Stew (Note: Duffield became 3rd Stew in episode 15 after Barros was promoted to 2nd Stew.)	Guest
Wihan Du Toit			Bosun (Note: Du Toit appears in episodes 1–11, before being let go due to poor job performance and causing toxicity amongst the crew.)	
Marina Marcondes de Barros			Stew/2nd Stew (Note: Barros is promoted to 2nd Stew in episode 15.)	
Lara Rigby			Chief Stew	
Adair Werley			Deckhand/Stew	
Alesia Harris			Sous Chef (Note: Harris appears in episodes 6 onwards of Season 2, replacing Bird.)	Sous Chef/Stew (Note: Harris steps down as Sous Chef in episode 3 and switches to the interior.)
Nate Salmon			Bosun (Note: Salmon appears in episodes 11 onwards, replacing Du Toit.)	
Nicolas Cattelan			Deckhand (Note: Cattelan appears in episodes 11 onwards, replacing Arvanitis.)	
Ben Robinson				Head Chef
Daisy Kelliher				Chief Stew
Jenna Woudberg				2nd Stew/Stew (Note: Woudberg was demoted from 2nd Stew in episode 16 due to her behavior while off charter. She earned her stripes back in episode 18.)
Joe Caron				Stew (Note: Caron only appeared in episode 1 as she quit before the first charter due to a family emergency.)
Mike Durrant				Deck/Stew (Note: Durrant appears in episodes 1–14 and was fired for insubordination.)
Eddy Hounsell				Deckhand
Betul Yazici				Deckhand
Elena Dubaich				Galley Hand (Note: Dubaich, who previously appeared on Mediterranean as a stew, replaces Harris as Sous Chef.)
Barbie Pascual				Stew (Note: Pascual, who previously appeared on the original Below Deck, appears in episode 15 onwards, replacing Durrant. She was already friends with Dubaich before joining.)

== Episodes ==
=== Series overview ===
Season	Episodes	Originally released		
Season	Episodes	First released	Last released	Network
1	17	March 17, 2022	June 23, 2022	Peacock
2	18	July 17, 2023	September 18, 2023	Bravo
3	17	February 3, 2025	May 26, 2025	Bravo
4	18	February 2, 2026	June 1, 2026	Bravo

=== Season 1 (2022) ===
No. overall	No. in season	Title	Original release date
1	1	"G'Day Mate!"	March 17, 2022
2	2	"Unchained and Untamed"	March 17, 2022
3	3	"The Plunger from Down Under"	March 17, 2022
4	4	"The Pirate's Booty"	March 24, 2022
5	5	"Something's Fishy"	March 31, 2022
6	6	"The Tipping Point"	April 7, 2022
7	7	"The Safety Dance"	April 14, 2022
8	8	"Prom Night"	April 21, 2022
9	9	"Squid Games"	April 28, 2022
10	10	"Loads of Croc"	May 5, 2022
11	11	"Benny and the Jet Skis"	May 12, 2022
12	12	"Yachtie or Nice?"	May 19, 2022
13	13	"99 Problems and Thalassa Ain't One"	May 26, 2022
14	14	"New Kids on the Block"	June 2, 2022
15	15	"Nice Girls Finish Last"	June 9, 2022
16	16	"Dirty Laundry"	June 16, 2022
17	17	"Drink Like No One's Watching"	June 23, 2022

=== Season 2 (2023) ===
No. overall	No. in season	Title	Original release date	U.S. viewers (millions)
18	1	"Yes, We Cairns!"	July 17, 2023	0.76
19	2	"Floating Circus"	July 24, 2023	0.85
20	3	"Ice, Ice, Maybe"	July 24, 2023	0.72
21	4	"All's Fair in Love and Downpour"	July 31, 2023	0.75
22	5	"Everyone Everywhere All at Once"	July 31, 2023	0.61
23	6	"All Wrong"	August 7, 2023	0.78
24	7	"The Turnover Day"	August 7, 2023	0.77
25	8	"Great Sexpectations"	August 14, 2023	0.87
26	9	"Angel Nude Cake"	August 14, 2023	0.80
27	10	"Kiss Kiss Clang Clang"	August 21, 2023	0.81
28	11	"Anchors Astray!"	August 21, 2023	0.78
29	12	"Find Me Some Budgie to Love"	August 28, 2023	0.92
30	13	"The Wheel of Misfortune"	August 28, 2023	0.84
31	14	"Tick the Box"	September 4, 2023	0.91
32	15	"It's Not About the Lactose"	September 4, 2023	0.79
33	16	"The Magic Seamen"	September 11, 2023	0.83
34	17	"An Eruption of Volcanic Proportions"	September 11, 2023	0.73
35	18	"She's Just Not That Into You"	September 18, 2023	0.82

=== Season 3 (2025) ===
No. overall	No. in season	Title	Original release date	U.S. viewers (millions)
36	1	"Seychelles, by the Seashore"	February 3, 2025	0.59
37	2	"Too Many Cooks"	February 10, 2025	0.54
38	3	"Walking on Eggshells"	February 17, 2025	0.59
39	4	"Kiss and Don't Tell"	February 24, 2025	0.58
40	5	"Submergency"	March 3, 2025	0.53
41	6	"The Captain's Lounge"	March 10, 2025	0.54
42	7	"Declaration of Love"	March 17, 2025	0.61
43	8	"Rumble in the Jungle"	March 24, 2025	0.55
44	9	"Foam Sick"	March 31, 2025	0.58
45	10	"A Greek Tragedy"	April 7, 2025	0.58
46	11	"The Shots You Don't Take"	April 14, 2025	0.64
47	12	"Across Frenemy Lines"	April 21, 2025	0.61
48	13	"Lipstick Service"	April 28, 2025	0.61
49	14	"The Circus"	May 5, 2025	0.59
50	15	"Smoochies"	May 12, 2025	0.56
51	16	"Come Swell or High Water"	May 19, 2025	0.66
52	17	"Never Can Sey' Goodbye"	May 26, 2025	0.51

=== Season 4 (2026) ===
No. overall	No. in season	Title	Original release date	U.S. viewers (millions)
53	1	"The Real Housewives of Down Under"	February 2, 2026	0.74
54	2	"Night of the Living Dread"	February 9, 2026	0.62
55	3	"The Boil Over"	February 16, 2026	0.64
56	4	"The Chef's Assistant"	February 23, 2026	0.68
57	5	"Textual Tension"	March 2, 2026	0.72
58	6	"Gossip Boy"	March 9, 2026	0.64
59	7	"Burnt Bridges"	March 16, 2026	0.65
60	8	"Call Me By My Name"	March 23, 2026	0.70
61	9	"Till Chaos Do Us Part"	March 30, 2026	0.65
62	10	"Making Enemies"	April 6, 2026	0.64
63	11	"Soapy Eggs"	April 13, 2026	0.61
64	12	"Dates and Confused"	April 20, 2026	0.61
65	13	"The Way the Cookie Crumbles"	April 27, 2026	0.70
66	14	"Head of the Deck/Stew Department"	May 4, 2026	0.65
67	15	"It's Not About the Shrimp"	May 11, 2026	0.66
68	16	"The Garden Party"	May 18, 2026	0.69
69	17	"When Egos Collide"	May 25, 2026	0.69
70	18	"Canouan and Done"	June 1, 2026	0.87

== Broadcast ==
Season 1 of Below Deck Down Under aired on Peacock in the United States and Hayu in the UK and Australia every Thursday. It began airing on March 17, 2022 on Peacock and Hayu.

Currently, Below Deck Down Under airs on Bravo, with episodes being released on Peacock and Hayu the next day.

== Production and Economic Impact in Australia ==
Filming of Below Deck Down Under in Australia was facilitated by The Superyacht People, an Australian superyacht logistics company. The company initiated collaboration with the show's producers in 2017, conducting extensive location scouting and logistical planning. Season 1 was filmed in the Whitsundays and Season 2 in Cairns, with The Superyacht People coordinating charter yachts, support vessels, crew logistics, catering, and water taxi transfers.

The production reportedly injected tens of millions of dollars into the regional economy during a critical period following the COVID-19 pandemic. It also created employment opportunities for approximately 70 production crew members and supported numerous local businesses in the tourism and hospitality sectors. The visibility from the show helped promote Australia's superyacht industry and scenic coastal regions to a global audience.

Strict COVID-19 safety measures were also implemented throughout the filming process to protect cast, crew, and local communities.
