= List of Below Deck episodes =

Below Deck is an American reality television series which premiered on July 1, 2013, on Bravo. The show chronicles the lives of the crew members who work and reside aboard a superyacht during charter season. It shows the crew as they deal with their personal issues in order to make their professional careers work. Every season ends with a special dedicated reunion episode of Watch What Happens Live! with Andy Cohen, in which the cast members discuss the events of the season. However, seasons 10 and 11 did not show any reunion episodes.

As of November 16, 2026, a total of 193 original episodes of Below Deck have aired.

== Overview ==
Season	Episodes	Originally released	
Season	Episodes	First released	Last released
1	11	July 1, 2013	September 9, 2013
2	13	August 12, 2014	November 4, 2014
3	15	August 25, 2015	December 1, 2015
4	14	September 6, 2016	December 6, 2016
5	15	September 5, 2017	December 12, 2017
6	17	October 2, 2018	February 5, 2019
7	20	October 7, 2019	February 17, 2020
8	17	November 2, 2020	February 22, 2021
9	15	October 25, 2021	February 7, 2022
10	17	November 21, 2022	March 20, 2023
11	17	February 5, 2024	May 27, 2024
12	16	June 2, 2025	September 15, 2025
13	TBA	October 12, 2026	TBA

== Episodes ==
=== Season 1 (2013) ===
No. overall	No. in season	Title	Original release date	U.S. viewers (millions)
1	1	"Cool Your Jets"	July 1, 2013	1.08
2	2	"It's Not Easy Being Green"	July 8, 2013	1.23
3	3	"Dude, That's a Dude, Dude"	July 15, 2013	1.17
4	4	"Luggage, Luggage Everywhere"	July 22, 2013	1.32
5	5	"I'm Living With the Devil"	July 29, 2013	1.34
6	6	"Sleeping With the Enemy"	August 5, 2013	1.43
7	7	"Naughty Yachties"	August 12, 2013	1.40
8	8	"There's a New Captain in Town"	August 19, 2013	1.55
9	9	"Land Ahoy... Finally"	August 26, 2013	1.75
10	10	"Reunion"	September 2, 2013	1.24
11	11	"The Crew Tells All"	September 9, 2013	0.91

=== Season 2 (2014) ===
No. overall	No. in season	Title	Original release date	U.S. viewers (millions)
12	1	"Shut Your Porthole!"	August 12, 2014	1.06
13	2	"Hex on the Beach"	August 19, 2014	0.85
14	3	"Mojitos Mo' Problems"	August 26, 2014	0.89
15	4	"Charter Guest Soulmate"	September 2, 2014	0.96
16	5	"Bitchy Resting Face"	September 9, 2014	1.14
17	6	"Strains, Stains and a Big Pain"	September 16, 2014	1.23
18	7	"She'd Better Not Be Staying"	September 23, 2014	1.08
19	8	"New Kid on the Dock"	September 30, 2014	1.13
20	9	"You're Grounded"	October 7, 2014	1.19
21	10	"Premature Corkulation"	October 14, 2014	1.13
22	11	"Dry Land, Damp Eyes"	October 21, 2014	1.43
23	12	"The Crew Tells All"	October 28, 2014	0.83
24	13	"Reunion"	November 4, 2014	0.98

=== Season 3 (2015) ===
No. overall	No. in season	Title	Original release date	U.S. viewers (millions)
25	1	"More Foam, Bosun!"	August 25, 2015	1.08
26	2	"Off the Radar"	September 1, 2015	1.03
27	3	"Pretty Cheeks"	September 8, 2015	1.14
28	4	"I Don't Date, I Mate"	September 15, 2015	1.12
29	5	"Dearest Emile"	September 22, 2015	1.11
30	6	"I’m Ironing the Captain’s Shorts"	September 29, 2015	1.12
31	7	"Storm's a Comin'"	October 6, 2015	1.27
32	8	"Boom Boom in the Laundry Room"	October 13, 2015	1.17
33	9	"Fire!"	October 20, 2015	1.28
34	10	"What Took You So Long?"	October 27, 2015	1.46
35	11	"The Real Housewives of Atlanta"	November 3, 2015	1.47
36	12	"Dirty Laundry"	November 10, 2015	1.48
37	13	"Loose Lips Sink Ships"	November 17, 2015	1.72
38	14	"Reunion Part 1"	November 24, 2015	1.25
39	15	"Reunion Part 2"	December 1, 2015	1.29

=== Season 4 (2016) ===
No. overall	No. in season	Title	Original release date	U.S. viewers (millions)
40	1	"No One Said This Job Was Easy"	September 6, 2016	1.41
41	2	"What Happens in the Hot Tub Stays in the Hot Tub"	September 13, 2016	1.37
42	3	"Hair Models and Filthy Martinis"	September 20, 2016	1.11
43	4	"That Tuna is F@#!ed"	September 27, 2016	1.44
44	5	"The Freak Comes Out At Night"	October 4, 2016	1.41
45	6	"The One Where the Charter Guests Almost Die"	October 11, 2016	1.56
46	7	"Decent Proposal"	October 18, 2016	1.52
47	8	"One Less Fish in the Sea"	October 25, 2016	1.31
48	9	"The Sea Was Angry"	November 1, 2016	1.46
49	10	"Bombed by a Care Bear"	November 9, 2016	1.27
50	11	"Bosun Blues"	November 15, 2016	1.46
51	12	"Bemily"	November 22, 2016	1.45
52	13	"Waking the Resting Bitch Face"	November 29, 2016	1.53
53	14	"50 Shades of Ben"	December 6, 2016	1.42

=== Season 5 (2017) ===
No. overall	No. in season	Title	Original release date	U.S. viewers (millions)
54	1	"The 1 Percenters"	September 5, 2017	1.31
55	2	"It Ain't Easy Being Green"	September 12, 2017	0.97
56	3	"Jesus Saves"	September 19, 2017	1.25
57	4	"Kate Goes to Church"	September 26, 2017	1.16
58	5	"Cool Beans"	October 3, 2017	1.25
59	6	"100 Feet From Catastrophe"	October 10, 2017	1.36
60	7	"Blindsided"	October 17, 2017	1.34
61	8	"Under Cover Boss"	October 24, 2017	1.28
62	9	"Hot Mess Express"	October 31, 2017	1.20
63	10	"King Come-On-I-Wanna-Lay-Ya"	November 7, 2017	1.30
64	11	"Only Doing It for the Money"	November 14, 2017	1.39
65	12	"55 and Lovin' It"	November 21, 2017	1.30
66	13	"The One Where Jen Loses Her Mind"	November 28, 2017	1.46
67	14	"The Champagne Campaign"	December 5, 2017	1.56
68	15	"Reunion"	December 12, 2017	0.90

=== Season 6 (2018–19) ===
No. overall	No. in season	Title	Original release date	U.S. viewers (millions)
69	1	"We're Not in the Caribbean Anymore"	October 2, 2018	1.27
70	2	"Foam, Party of One"	October 9, 2018	1.21
71	3	"I'm Also a Boat Captain!"	October 16, 2018	1.22
72	4	"Bitch in Charge"	October 23, 2018	1.39
73	5	"Naked Smoothies"	October 30, 2018	1.39
74	6	"Get Better or Go Home"	November 6, 2018	1.32
75	7	"New Kids on the Dock"	November 13, 2018	1.35
76	8	"Flesh Wounds Are Not Five Star"	November 20, 2018	1.40
77	9	"Insult to Injury"	November 27, 2018	1.67
78	10	"Man Overboard"	December 4, 2018	1.81
79	11	"Let Them Eat Chicken!"	December 11, 2018	2.11
80	12	"Check Yourself!"	December 18, 2018	1.64
81	13	"I Said I Got It!"	January 8, 2019	1.45
82	14	"All that Glitters Isn't Gold"	January 15, 2019	0.53
83	15	"Shame Cocoon"	January 22, 2019	1.61
84	16	"Au Revoir!"	January 29, 2019	1.69
85	17	"Reunion"	February 5, 2019	1.24

=== Season 7 (2019–20) ===
No. overall	No. in season	Title	Original release date	U.S. viewers (millions)
86	1	"Man Down!"	October 7, 2019	1.41
87	2	"The Proposal"	October 14, 2019	1.38
88	3	"Weekend at Brandy's"	October 21, 2019	1.43
89	4	"Weekend at Brandy's II"	October 28, 2019	1.50
Brian trades shirts with a bartender and flirts the night away in Thailand.
90	5	"Magic Ashton"	November 4, 2019	1.53
91	6	"Penis Ravine*"	November 11, 2019	1.43
92	7	"Smashton"	November 18, 2019	1.55
93	8	"A Recipe for Disaster"	November 25, 2019	1.49
94	9	"12 Seconds in Heaven"	December 2, 2019	1.66
95	10	"Everyone Hates Kate"	December 9, 2019	1.69
96	11	"I'm Sorry You Feel That Way"	December 16, 2019	1.68
97	12	"Yacht-Pocalypse Now"	December 23, 2019	1.39
98	13	"Exodus"	December 30, 2019	1.72
99	14	"Witch-Hunt"	January 6, 2020	1.58
-	-	"Watch What Happens Live!: Below Deck 100th Episode"	January 6, 2020	0.89
100	15	"Public Displays of Affection"	January 13, 2020	1.71
101	16	"The Scorpion Queen"	January 20, 2020	1.72
102	17	"Let Them Eat Penis Cake!"	January 27, 2020	1.74
103	18	"Big Girls, Do Cry"	February 3, 2020	1.75
104	19	"Reunion Part 1"	February 10, 2020	1.59
105	20	"Reunion Part 2"	February 17, 2020	1.20

- Episode 6 is listed as "Come Sail Away" for some TV provider listings

=== Season 8 (2020–21) ===
No. overall	No. in season	Title	Original release date	U.S. viewers (millions)
106	1	"There's No Place Like Home"	November 2, 2020	1.20
107	2	"There's No Crying in Yachting"	November 9, 2020	1.40
108	3	"Max and Dax's Excellent Adventure"	November 16, 2020	1.46
109	4	"Do Not Disturb"	November 23, 2020	1.37
110	5	"Champagne Wishes and Caviar Screams"	November 30, 2020	1.38
111	6	"Just Another Day in Paradise"	December 7, 2020	1.47
112	7	"Runaway Chef"	December 14, 2020	1.55
113	8	"No Way Rosé"	December 21, 2020	1.61
114	9	"The Devil You Know"	December 28, 2020	1.56
115	10	"Steamy Vibes"	January 4, 2021	1.56
116	11	"Blood in the Water"	January 11, 2021	1.60
117	12	"Blue Skies and UTI's"	January 18, 2021	1.67
118	13	"James' Big Cannoli"	January 25, 2021	1.55
119	14	"Hide the Salami"	February 1, 2021	1.54
120	15	"Don't Cry for Me Antigua"	February 8, 2021	1.46
121	16	"Premature Evacuation"	February 15, 2021	1.64
122	17	"Reunion"	February 22, 2021	0.49

=== Season 9 (2021–22) ===
No. overall	No. in season	Title	Original release date	U.S. viewers (millions)
123	1	"One Step Closer to World Domination"	October 25, 2021	1.36
124	2	"Boat Daddy"	November 1, 2021	1.26
125	3	"Bourbon Buffoonery"	November 8, 2021	1.20
126	4	"Pissed-On Chickens Can't Compare"	November 15, 2021	1.40
127	5	"Leave Your Emotions at the Cabin Door"	November 22, 2021	1.18
128	6	"He Kissed A Boy And He Liked It"	November 29, 2021	1.21
129	7	"Plenty of Jake to Go Around!"	December 6, 2021	1.22
130	8	"Compliments of Captain Lee's Travel Agency"	December 13, 2021	1.32
131	9	"When Eddie Met Sally"	December 20, 2021	1.25
132	10	"The Smell of Sweat and Desperation"	January 3, 2022	1.21
133	11	"Shoulda Joined the Navy"	January 10, 2022	1.27
134	12	"New Stew on the Block"	January 17, 2022	1.26
135	13	"Unfinished Business"	January 24, 2022	1.34
136	14	"We Made It, Ya Slags"	January 31, 2022	1.29
137	15	"Reunion"	February 7, 2022	N/A

=== Season 10 (2022–23) ===
No. overall	No. in season	Title	Original release date	U.S. viewers (millions)
138	1	"Love Never Lasts at the Beach"	November 21, 2022	0.85
139	2	"Deadliest Snatch"	November 28, 2022	0.92
140	3	"The Muff-Truff Experience"	December 5, 2022	0.85
141	4	"The Thunder from Down Under"	December 12, 2022	0.80
142	5	"His Watch Has Ended"	December 19, 2022	1.18
143	6	"There's No Crying in Yachting Part 2"	January 2, 2023	0.98
144	7	"Eat Me In Seven Different Languages"	January 9, 2023	1.08
145	8	"The Captain and Camille"	January 16, 2023	1.10
146	9	"Diary of a Deckie"	January 23, 2023	1.26
147	10	"Caribbean Gigolo"	January 30, 2023	1.20
148	11	"Fraz-zzled"	February 6, 2023	1.15
149	12	"The Fish Stinks From the Head"	February 13, 2023	1.09
150	13	"Another One Bites the Dust"	February 20, 2023	1.26
151	14	"Big Deck Energy"	February 27, 2023	1.12
152	15	"The Stud Sails Again"	March 6, 2023	1.16
153	16	"The Thunder from Down Under Part 2"	March 13, 2023	1.07
154	17	"Oh Captain, My Captain"	March 20, 2023	1.14

=== Season 11 (2024) ===
No. overall	No. in season	Title	Original release date	U.S. viewers (millions)
155	1	"New Capt, New Rules"	February 5, 2024	0.82
156	2	"Pier Pressure"	February 12, 2024	0.83
157	3	"Breaking Barbie"	February 19, 2024	0.73
158	4	"It's Always Sunny in Grenada"	February 26, 2024	0.82
159	5	"Come on Eileen"	March 4, 2024	0.72
160	6	"Love Me Tender"	March 11, 2024	0.74
161	7	"Cat's Out of the Bag"	March 18, 2024	0.76
162	8	"Murder on the High Seas"	March 25, 2024	0.74
163	9	"The Real Housewives of Grenada"	April 1, 2024	0.78
164	10	"Grenadian Nightmare"	April 8, 2024	0.75
165	11	"Royal Rumble"	April 15, 2024	0.74
166	12	"Bit of an Ick"	April 22, 2024	0.77
167	13	"Happy Captain, Happy Life"	April 29, 2024	0.80
168	14	"Disappointing Daddy"	May 6, 2024	0.76
169	15	"We'll Always Have Paris"	May 13, 2024	0.75
170	16	"Salt in Chef's Wounds"	May 20, 2024	0.89
171	17	"End of the Line"	May 27, 2024	0.83

=== Season 12 (2025) ===
No. overall	No. in season	Title	Original release date	U.S. viewers (millions)
172	1	"Fresh Meat"	June 2, 2025	0.57
173	2	"Bollywood Nights"	June 9, 2025	0.61
174	3	"Fight Island"	June 16, 2025	0.61
175	4	"Island of Sausages"	June 23, 2025	0.62
176	5	"Rainbeau Kisses, Friendship Wishes"	June 30, 2025	0.60
177	6	"Yacht-chella"	July 7, 2025	0.59
178	7	"Party Dockin' in the House Tonight"	July 14, 2025	0.64
179	8	"Bad Romance"	July 21, 2025	0.55
180	9	"A Holiday in Handcuffs"	July 28, 2025	0.56
181	10	"Some Like It Stillie"	August 4, 2025	0.64
182	11	"The Rumor Mill"	August 11, 2025	0.75
183	12	"Dock It Like It's Hot"	August 18, 2025	0.69
184	13	"Talk Derby to Me"	August 25, 2025	0.63
185	14	"Nobody Puts Baby Breaks in the Corner"	September 1, 2025	0.56
186	15	"All the Single Ladies"	September 8, 2025	0.60
187	16	"Over the Rainbeau"	September 15, 2025	0.59

=== Season 13 (2026–27) ===
No. overall	No. in season	Title	Original release date	U.S. viewers (millions)
188	1	"What a Thai to Be Alive"	October 12, 2026	N/A
189	2	"Pier Pressure"	October 19, 2026	N/A
190	3	"Mo Preferences, Moe Problems"	October 26, 2026	TBD
191	4	"Diva Down Bad for a Deckie"	November 2, 2026	TBD
192	5	"Knot So Innocent"	November 9, 2026	TBD
193	6	"Over the Rainbeau"	November 16, 2026	TBD
194	7	"Who's the Boss?"	November 23, 2026	TBD
195	8	"Shape Up or Ship Out"	November 30, 2026	TBD
196	9	"Smoke and Mirrors"	December 7, 2026	TBD
197	10	"Nauti Boys"	December 14, 2026	TBD
