= Below Deck Adventure =

American reality television series

- Genre: Reality
- Country of origin: United States
- Original language: English
- No. of episodes: 13

Production
- Production company: Shed Media

Original release
- Network: Bravo
- Release: November 1, 2022 – January 31, 2023

Related
- Below Deck; Below Deck Mediterranean; Below Deck Sailing Yacht; Below Deck Down Under

Below Deck Adventure is an American reality television series that premiered on Bravo on November 1, 2022. The show is the 4th spin-off of the Below Deck franchise, after Below Deck Mediterranean, Below Deck Sailing Yacht and Below Deck Down Under. The show takes place on and off the luxury yacht "Mercury" which cruises among the fjords of Norway. Building on the concept of the previous shows, this version of the show incorporates off-ship activities such as parasailing, bicycling and rock climbing engaged in by the yacht guests and crew. The show was filmed between July 25, 2021 and September 14, 2021, and was based out of the town of Ålesund, Norway.

== Cast ==
- Kerry Titheradge – Captain
- Jessica Condy – Chef
- Faye Clarke – Chief Stewardess
- Oriana Schneps – Stewardess
- Kasie Faddah – Stewardess
- Lewis Lupton – Bosun
- Seth Jacobson – Deckhand (ep 7–11), Lead Deckhand (ep 11–13)
- Nathan Morley – Deckhand
- Michael Gilman – Deckhand
- Kyle Dickard – Deckhand (ep 1–3)

== Episodes ==
No.	Title	Original release date	U.S. viewers (millions)
1	"Mercury Rising"	November 1, 2022	0.42
2	"Viking Cowboy"	November 8, 2022	0.39
3	"Norwegian Tussle"	November 15, 2022	0.52
4	"Mercury Mayhem"	November 22, 2022	0.38
5	"Under the Bubbles"	November 29, 2022	0.51
6	"(The Real) Yacht-Wives of Norway"	December 6, 2022	0.48
7	"Aye, Aye, Captain Deckhand"	December 13, 2022	0.58
8	"Elevate Yourself"	December 27, 2022	0.64
9	"Can't A-Fjord to Lose"	January 3, 2023	0.62
10	"Abseiling Away"	January 10, 2023	0.60
11	"Zero Fjords Given"	January 17, 2023	0.67
12	"Crazy Rich Charter Guests"	January 24, 2023	0.59
13	"The Long Fjord-Bye"	January 31, 2023	0.70
