= Below Deck Mediterranean =

American reality television series

- Genre: Reality
- Created by: Mark Cronin; Rebecca Taylor Henning; Doug Henning
- Country of origin: United States
- Original language: English
- No. of seasons: 11
- No. of episodes: 192 (list of episodes)

Production
- Executive producers: Mark Cronin; Nadine Rajabi; Courtland Cox; Wes Denton
- Running time: 43-68 minutes
- Production company: 51 Minds Entertainment

Original release
- Network: Bravo
- Release: May 3, 2016 – present

Related
- Below Deck; Below Deck Sailing Yacht; Below Deck Down Under; Below Deck Adventure

Below Deck Mediterranean is an American reality television series that premiered on Bravo on May 3, 2016. Developed as the first spin-off of Below Deck, it has aired ten seasons. The eleventh season premiered on June 8, 2026.

The series chronicles the lives of the crew members who work and reside aboard a 150-foot-plus (46 m) superyacht during a charter season in Greece (seasons 1 and 9), Croatia (seasons 2, 6, and 11), Italy (seasons 3 and 8), France (season 4), Spain (seasons 5 and 10) and Malta (season 7) which consists of filming for around six weeks with the cast temporarily replacing the conventional crew. All seasons are currently available on Peacock streaming service.

== Yachts ==
=== Summary ===
- Ionian Princess at 46 m (151 ft)
- Sirocco built by Dutch shipyard Heesen 2006|2013 at 47 m (154 ft)
- Talisman Maiton at 54 m (177 ft)
- The Wellington (aka the Wellesley) built by Dutch shipyard OceanCo 1993|2016 at 56.2m/184'5 ft
- Lady Michelle
- Home built by Dutch shipyard Heesen 2017 at 49 m (161 ft)
- Mustique
- Bravado
- Akira One

=== Specifications ===
Specifications from Yacht Charter Fleet
Season	Yachts	Model	Built | Refit	Built By	Length	Cruising Speed	Gross tonnage
Season 1	"Ionian Princess" (aka "Kefi")	Custom	2005 | 2021	Christensen (U.S.A.)	45.72 m (150.0 ft)	12 Knots	416
Season 2 & 4	"Sirocco"	4700 Series	2006 | 2013	Heesen (Netherlands)	47 m (154 ft 2 in)	22 Knots	495
Season 3	"Talisman Maiton"	Custom	2006 | 2016	Turquoise Yachts (Turkey)	54.2 m (177 ft 10 in)	12 Knots	692
Season 5	"The Wellington" (aka "The Wellesley")	Custom	1993 | 2016	OceanCo (Netherlands)	56.2 m (184 ft 5 in)	14 Knots	646
Season 6	"Lady Michelle" (aka "Shalawaty")	Custom	2003 | 2017	Benetti (Italy)	55 m (180 ft 5 in)	14 Knots	909
Season 7	"Home"	Custom	2017	Heesen (Netherlands)	49 m (160 ft 9 in)	13 Knots	499
Season 8 & 9	"Mustique" (aka "Purpose")	Custom	2005	Trinity Yachts (U.S.A.)	54.99 m (180 ft 5 in)	12 Knots	860
Season 10	"Bravado"	Custom	2004	Abeking & Rasmussen (Germany)	44.91 m (147 ft 4 in)	10 Knots	499
Season 11	"Akira One"	Golden Bay	1997	Benetti (Italy)	51.82 m (170 ft 0 in)	14 Knots	490

== Cast ==
=== Season 1: Ionian Princess ===
First aired: May 3, 2016

- Mark Howard – Captain
- Bryan Kattenburg – Bosun (ep 1), First Officer (ep 1–13)
- Ben Robinson – Chef
- Hannah Ferrier – Chief Stew
- Julia d'Albert Pusey – 2nd Stew
- Tiffany Copeland – 3rd Stew
- Daniel "Danny" Zureikat – Deckhand (ep 1–12)
- Jen Riservato – Deckhand
- Bobby Giancola – Deckhand.

=== Season 2: Sirocco ===
First aired: May 2, 2017

- Sandra "Sandy" Yawn – Captain
- Adam Glick – Chef
- Hannah Ferrier – Chief Stew
- Christine "Bugsy" Drake – 2nd Stew
- Lauren Cohen – 3rd Stew
- Wesley Walton – Bosun
- Malia White – Deckhand (ep 1–10), Lead Deckhand (ep 11–14)
- Max Hagley – Deckhand
- Bobby Giancola – Deckhand

=== Season 3: Talisman Maiton ===
First aired: May 15, 2018

- Sandra "Sandy" Yawn – Captain
- Adam Glick – Chef
- Hannah Ferrier – Chief Stew
- Brooke Laughton – 2nd Stew
- Kasey Cohen – 3rd Stew
- Conrad Empson – Bosun
- João Franco – Lead Deckhand
- Colin Macy-O'Toole – Deckhand
- Jamie Jason – Deckhand

=== Season 4: Sirocco ===
First aired: June 3, 2019

- Sandra "Sandy" Yawn - Captain
- Mila Kolomeitseva – Chef (ep 1–5)
- Ben Robinson – Chef (ep 13–18)
- Hannah Ferrier – Chief Stew
- Aesha Scott – 2nd Stew
- Anastasia Surmava – 3rd Stew (ep 1–4, 13–18), Chef (ep 5–12)
- June Foster – 3rd Stew (ep 7–13)
- João Franco – Bosun
- Travis Michalzik – Lead Deckhand
- Colin Macy-O'Toole – Deckhand
- Jack Stirrup – Deckhand

=== Season 5: The Wellington ===
First aired: June 1, 2020

- Sandra "Sandy" Yawn – Captain
- Hindrigo "Kiko" Lorran – Chef (ep 1–10)
- Tom Checketts – Chef (ep 11–20)
- Hannah Ferrier – Chief Stew (ep 1–12)
- Lara Flumiani – 2nd Stew (ep 1–3)
- Christine "Bugsy" Drake – 2nd Stew (ep 4–12), Chief Stew (ep 12–20)
- Aesha Scott – 2nd Stew (ep 13–20)
- Jessica More – 3rd Stew
- Malia White – Bosun
- Peter Hunziker – Lead Deckhand (ep 1–7), Deckhand (ep 7–20) – later fired by the production company.
- Alex Radcliffe – Deckhand (ep 1–18), Lead Deckhand (ep 18-20)
- Robert Westergaard – Deckhand

=== Season 6: Lady Michelle ===
First aired: June 28, 2021

- Sandra "Sandy" Yawn – Captain
- Mathew Shea – Chef
- Katie Flood – Chief Stew
- Lexi Wilson – 2nd Stew (ep 1–9), Stew (ep 9–13)
- Courtney Veale – 3rd Stew (ep 1–9), Stew (ep 9–14), 2nd Stew (ep 15–18)
- Delaney Evans – Stew (ep 9–13)
- Malia White – Bosun
- David Pascoe – Deckhand (ep 1–16), Lead Deckhand (ep 17–18)
- Lloyd Spencer – Deckhand
- Mzi "Zee" Dempers – Deckhand

=== Season 7: Home ===
First aired: July 11, 2022

- Sandra "Sandy" Yawn – Captain
- David White – Chef
- Natasha "Tasha" Webb – Chief Stew
- Natalya "Nat" Scudder – 2nd Stew
- Kyle Viljoen – 2nd Stew
- Elena Dubaich – Stew (ep 18–19)
- Raygan Tyler – Bosun (ep 1–5)
- Storm Smith – Lead Deckhand (ep 1–5), Provisional Bosun (ep 5–9), Bosun (ep 9–19)
- Mzi "Zee" Dempers – Deckhand
- Jason Gaskell – Deckhand (ep 1–14)
- Courtney Veale – Deckhand (ep 6–13), Lead Deckhand (ep 13–19)
- Reid Jenkins – Deckhand (ep 14–19)

=== Season 8: Mustique ===
First aired: September 25, 2023

- Sandra "Sandy" Yawn – Captain
- Jack Luby – Chef
- Natalya "Nat" Scudder – Temp Chief Stew (ep 1–2), 3rd Stew (ep 3–9)
- Tumi Mhlongo – Chief Stew (ep 2–16)
- Kyle Viljoen – 2nd Stew (ep 3–16)
- Jessika Asai – 2nd Stew (ep 1–2), 4th Stew (ep 3–10), 3rd Stew (ep 10–16)
- Brooke Boney – Temp 3rd Stew (ep 1–2)
- Lily Davison – 4th Stew (ep 10–16)
- Ruán Irving – Bosun (ep 1)
- Luka Brunton – Deckhand (ep 1), Provisional Bosun (ep 1–2), Bosun (ep 2–16)
- Lara Du Preez – Deckhand (ep 1–5), Lead Deckhand (ep 5–16)
- Haleigh Gorman – Deckhand
- Max Salvador – Deckhand (ep 3–16)

=== Season 9: Mustique ===
First aired: June 3, 2024

- Sandra "Sandy" Yawn – Captain
- Johnathan "Jono" Shillingford – Chef
- Aesha Scott – Chief Stew
- Elena Dubaich – 2nd Stew
- Bri Muller – 3rd Stew
- Carrie O'Neill – Stew (ep 14–17)
- Iain Maclean – Bosun
- Joe Bradley – Lead Deckhand
- Nathan Gallagher – Deckhand
- Gael Cameron – Deckhand

=== Season 10: Bravado ===
First aired: September 29, 2025

- Sandra "Sandy" Yawn – Captain
- Josh Bingham – Chef
- Aesha Scott – Chief Stew
- Kizzi Kitchener – 2nd Stew
- Victoria "V" SanJuan – 3rd Stew (ep 1–5), Deck/Stew (ep 5–6), Deckhand (ep 6–18)
- Cathy Skinner – 3rd Stew (ep 7–8), 2nd Stew (ep 8–18)
- Nathan Gallagher – Bosun
- Max Salvador – Deckhand
- Christian Trimino – Deckhand (ep 1–5)
- Tessa Budd – Deckhand (ep 1–5)
- Joe Bradley – Deckhand (ep 5–11), Lead Deckhand (ep 11–18)
- Gael Cameron – Temp Deckhand (ep 12–15)

=== Season 11: Akira One ===
First aired: June 8, 2026

- Sandra "Sandy" Yawn – Captain
- Joy Lefaucheur – Chef
- Aesha Scott – Chief Stew (ep 1–9, 12–18), Chief Stew/Deck (ep 9–12)
- Genevieve "Gen" Lillie – Stew
- Katrina "Kat" Johnston – Stew
- Kayley Smith – Stew (ep 1–3), 2nd Stew (ep 3–9, 12–18), Acting Chief Stew (ep 9–12)
- Nathan Gallagher – Bosun (ep 1–9, 12–18)
- Joe Bradley – Deckhand (ep 1–4), Lead Deckhand (ep 4–10, 12–18), Acting Bosun (ep 10–12)
- Cooper Dawson – Deckhand
- Luke Brumer – Deckhand (ep 1–8)
- Max Salvador – Deckhand (ep 10–13)
- Massi Scarcia – Deckhand (ep 14–18)

=== Timeline ===
Cast Members	Seasons										
Cast Members	1	2	3	4	5	6	7	8	9	10	11
Mark Howard	Captain										
Bryan Kattenburg	Bosun/First Officer										
Ben Robinson	Chef			Chef							
Hannah Ferrier	Chief Stew	Chief Stew	Chief Stew	Chief Stew	Chief Stew						Chief Stew Emerita
Julia d'Albert Pusey	2nd Stew										
Tiffany Copeland	3rd Stew										
Daniel "Danny" Zureikat	Deckhand										
Jen Riservato	Deckhand										
Bobby Giancola	Deckhand	Deckhand									
Sandra "Sandy" Yawn		Captain	Captain	Captain	Captain	Captain	Captain	Captain	Captain	Captain	Captain
Adam Glick		Chef	Chef								
Christine "Bugsy" Drake		2nd Stew			2nd/Chief Stew						
Lauren Cohen		3rd Stew									
Wesley Dalton		Bosun									
Malia White		Deckhand/Lead Deckhand			Bosun	Bosun					
Max Hagley		Deckhand									
Brooke Laughton			2nd Stew								
Kasey Cohen			3rd Stew								
Conrad Empson			Bosun								
João Franco			Lead Deckhand	Bosun							
Colin Macy-O'Toole			Deckhand	Deckhand							
Jamie Jason			Deckhand								
Mila Kolomeitseva				Chef							
Aesha Scott				2nd Stew					Chief Stew	Chief Stew	Chief Stew/Deckhand
Anastasia Surmava				3rd Stew/Chef							Stew Emerita
June Foster				3rd Stew							
Travis Michalzik				Lead Deckhand							
Jack Stirrup				Deckhand							
Hindrigo "Kiko" Lorran					Chef						
Tom Checketts					Chef						
Lara Flumiani					2nd Stew						
Jessica More					3rd Stew						
Peter Hunziker					Lead Deckhand/Deckhand						
Alex Radcliffe					Deckhand/Lead Deckhand						
Robert Westergard					Deckhand						
Mathew Shea						Chef					
Katie Flood						Chief Stew					
Lexi Wilson						2nd Stew/Stew					
Courtney Veale						3rd Stew/Stew/2nd Stew	Deckhand/Lead Deckhand				
Delaney Evans						Stew					
David Pascoe						Deckhand/Lead Deckhand					
Lloyd Spencer						Deckhand					
Mzi "Zee" Dempers						Deckhand	Deckhand				
David White							Chef				
Natasha "Tasha" Webb							Chief Stew				
Natalya "Nat" Scudder							2nd Stew	Temp Chief/3rd Stew			
Kyle Viljoen							2nd Stew				
Elena Dubaich							Stew		2nd Stew		
Raygan Tyler							Bosun				
Storm Smith							Lead Deckhand/Provisional Bosun/Bosun				
Jason Gaskell							Deckhand				
Reid Jenkins							Deckhand				
Jack Luby								Chef			
Tumi Mhlongo								Chief Stew			
Jessika Asai								2nd/4th/3rd Stew			
Brooke Boney								Temp 3rd Stew			
Lily Davison								4th Stew			
Ruán Irving								Bosun			
Luka Brunton								Deckhand/Provisional Bosun/Bosun			
Lara Du Preez								Deckhand/Lead Deckhand			
Haleigh Gorman								Deckhand			
Max Salvador								Deckhand		Deckhand	Deckhand
Johnathan Shillingford									Chef		
Bri Muller									3rd Stew		
Carrie O'Neill									Stew		
Iain Maclean									Bosun		
Joe Bradley									Lead Deckhand	Deckhand/Lead Deckhand	Deckhand/Lead Deckhand/Acting Bosun
Nathan Gallager									Deckhand	Bosun	Bosun
Gael Cameron									Deckhand	Temp Deckhand	Recurring
Josh Bingham										Chef	
Kizzi Kitchener										2nd Stew	
Victoria "V" SanJuan										3rd Stew/Deckhand	
Christian Trimino										Deckhand	
Tessa Budd										Deckhand	
Cathy Skinner										3rd/2nd Stew	
Joy Lefaucheur											Chef
Genevieve Lillie											Stew
Kayley Smith											Stew/2nd/Acting Chief Stew
Katrina Johnston											Stew
Cooper Dawson											Deckhand
Luke Brumer											Deckhand
Massi Scarcia											Deckhand

== Episodes ==
Season	Episodes	Originally released	
Season	Episodes	First released	Last released
1	13	May 3, 2016	July 26, 2016
2	15	May 2, 2017	August 15, 2017
3	17	May 15, 2018	September 11, 2018
4	18	June 3, 2019	September 30, 2019
5	22	June 1, 2020	October 26, 2020
6	18	June 28, 2021	October 18, 2021
7	20	July 11, 2022	November 22, 2022
8	16	September 25, 2023	January 22, 2024
9	17	June 3, 2024	September 23, 2024
10	18	September 29, 2025	January 26, 2026
11	18	June 8, 2026	October 5, 2026

== Broadcast ==
Below Deck Mediterranean airs on the Bravo cable network in the United States; the first episode premiered on Tuesday at 9/8pm ET/PT on May 3, 2016. A half-hour preview special of the series aired on March 23, 2016. In 2021, the British Channel 4 acquired the series for its E4 TV channel, which is aimed at 16–34 year olds, with the first episode on February 22, 2021, at 7:30pm.

== Reception ==
=== Ratings ===
Below Deck Mediterranean : U.S. viewers per episode (millions)

Season	Episode number																						Average
Season	1	2	3	4	5	6	7	8	9	10	11	12	13	14	15	16	17	18	19	20	21	22	Average
1	1.04	0.71	0.93	0.88	1.19	1.01	1.08	1.06	1.16	1.38	1.30	1.41	1.31	–									1.11
2	0.91	1.03	1.09	0.88	1.16	1.14	1.25	1.26	1.13	1.23	1.35	1.48	1.39	1.45	1.16	–							1.19
3	1.25	1.26	1.36	1.31	1.43	1.52	1.53	1.30	1.31	1.44	1.63	1.44	1.49	1.40	1.39	1.30	1.28	–					1.40
4	1.18	1.43	1.70	1.62	1.65	1.65	1.61	1.56	1.59	1.66	1.66	1.55	1.71	1.61	1.64	1.51	1.52	1.58	–				1.56
5	1.51	1.52	1.73	1.73	1.59	1.67	1.69	1.60	1.68	1.71	1.73	1.87	1.74	1.77	1.72	1.56	1.66	1.60	1.49	1.62	1.25	1.14	1.62
6	1.14	1.16	1.29	1.18	1.10	1.26	1.11	1.22	1.20	1.19	0.94	0.97	1.03	1.00	1.01	1.08	1.09	–					1.12
7	1.00	0.98	0.94	1.08	1.12	1.00	0.91	0.89	0.84	0.74	0.89	0.74	0.80	0.76	0.84	0.85	0.80	0.69	0.69	0.65	–		0.86
8	0.69	0.83	0.88	0.85	0.75	0.89	0.74	0.78	0.78	0.89	0.82	0.83	0.72	0.76	0.61	0.88	–						0.79
9	0.89	0.89	0.74	0.74	0.79	0.82	0.71	0.78	0.64	0.67	0.77	0.73	0.86	0.81	0.70	0.69	0.80	–					0.77
10	0.59	0.72	0.71	0.57	0.56	0.75	0.67	0.64	0.61	0.58	0.65	0.59	0.59	0.53	0.37	0.62	0.58	0.85	–				0.62
11	0.74	0.75	0.87	0.92	0.79	0.84	0.99	0.85	0.96	0.90	TBD	0.88	–										TBD

Audience measurement performed by Nielsen Media Research
