= Below Deck Sailing Yacht =

American reality television series

- Genre: Reality
- Created by: Mark Cronin; Rebecca Taylor Henning; Doug Henning
- Country of origin: United States
- Original language: English
- No. of seasons: 5
- No. of episodes: 89

Production
- Executive producers: Mark Cronin; Courtland Cox; Jill M. Goslicky; Christian Sarabia; Dan Volpe
- Running time: 42 minutes
- Production companies: Little Wooden Boat Productions; 51 Minds Entertainment

Original release
- Network: Bravo
- Release: February 3, 2020 – present

Related
- Below Deck; Below Deck Mediterranean; Below Deck Down Under; Below Deck Adventure

Below Deck Sailing Yacht is an American reality television series that was developed as the second spin-off of Below Deck. It premiered on Bravo on February 3, 2020.

The series chronicles the lives of the crew members who work and reside aboard a 177-foot (54 meter) sailing yacht during charter seasons in the Ionian Islands (Greece) in season 1, Croatia in season 2, Menorca (Spain) in season 3, Sardinia (Italy) in season 4 and Ibiza (Spain) in season 5.

== Cast ==
=== Season 1 (Parsifal III) ===
- Glenn Shephard — Captain
- Byron Hissey — Chief Engineer
- Paget Berry — First Officer
- Adam Glick — Chef
- Jenna MacGillivray — Chief Stewardess
- Madison Stalker — 2nd Stewardess
- Georgia Grobler — 3rd Stewardess
- Ciara Duggan — Deckhand
- Parker McCown — Deckhand (ep 1–12)
- Christopher Miller — Deckhand (ep 12–17)

=== Season 2 (Parsifal III) ===
- Glenn Shephard — Captain
- Colin Macrae — Chief Engineer
- Gary King — First Officer
- Natasha De Bourg — Chef
- Daisy Kelliher — Chief Stewardess
- Dani Soares — 2nd Stewardess
- Alli Dore — 3rd Stewardess
- Sydney Zaruba — Deckhand
- Jean-Luc Cerza Lanaux — Deckhand

=== Season 3 (Parsifal III) ===
- Glenn Shephard — Captain
- Colin Macrae — Chief Engineer
- Gary King — First Officer
- Marcos Spaziani — Chef
- Daisy Kelliher — Chief Stewardess
- Gabriela Barragán — 2nd Stewardess (ep 1–10)
- Ashley Marti— 3rd Stewardess (ep 1–11), Junior Stewardess (ep 12–17), Lead Stewardess (ep 17)
- Scarlett Bentley — Junior Stewardess (ep 12–17)
- Kelsie Goglia — Deckhand
- Tom Pearson — Deckhand (ep 1–7)
- Barnaby Birkbeck — Deckhand (ep 11–17)

=== Season 4 (Parsifal III) ===
- Glenn Shephard — Captain
- Colin Macrae — Chief Engineer
- Gary King — First Officer
- Ileisha Dell — Chef
- Daisy Kelliher — Chief Stewardess
- Lucy Edmunds — Junior Stewardess
- Mads Herrera — Junior Stewardess
- Chase Lemacks — Deckhand
- Alex Propson — Deckhand

=== Season 5 (Parsifal III) ===
- Glenn Shephard — Captain
- Davide Morosi — Chief Engineer
- Gary King — First Officer
- Cloyce Martin — Chef
- Daisy Kelliher — Chief Stewardess
- Diana Cruz — Stewardess
- Danni Warren — Stewardess
- Keith Allen — Deckhand
- Emma Crouch — Deckhand (ep 1–8)
- Chase Lemacks — Deckhand (ep 9–16)

=== Timeline ===
Cast Members	Seasons				
Cast Members	1	2	3	4	5
Paget Berry	First Officer				
Ciara Duggan	Deckhand				
Adam Glick	Chef				
Georgia Grobler	3rd Stewardess				
Byron Hissey	Chief Engineer				
Jenna MacGillivray	Chief Stewardess				
Parker McCown	Deckhand (ep 1-12)				
Christopher Miller	Deckhand (ep 12-17)				
Glenn Shepard	Captain	Captain	Captain	Captain	Captain
Madison Stalker	2nd Stewardess				
Jean Luc Cerza Lanaux		Deckhand			
Natasha De Bourg		Chef			
Alli Dore		3nd Stewardess			
Daisy Kelliher		Chief Stewardess	Chief Stewardess	Chief Stewardess	Chief Stewardess
Gary King		First Officer	First Officer	First Officer	First Officer
Colin Macrae		Chief Engineer	Chief Engineer	Chief Engineer	
Dani Soares		2nd Stewardess			
Sydney Zaruba		Deckhand			
Gabriela Barragán			2nd Stewardess (ep 1-10)		
Scarlett Bentley			Junior Stewardess (ep 12-17)		
Barnaby Birkbeck			Deckhand (ep 11-17)		
Kelsie Goglia			Deckhand		
Ashley Marti			3rd Stewardess (ep 1-11) Junior Stewardess (ep 11-17) Lead Stewardess (ep 17)		
Tom Pearson			Deckhand (ep 1-7)		
Marcos Spaziani			Chef		
Ileisha Dell				Chef	
Lucy Edmunds				Junior Stewardess	
Mads Herrera				Junior Stewardess	
Chase Lemacks				Deckhand	Deckhand (ep 9–16)
Alex Propson				Deckhand	
Keith Allen					Deckhand
Emma Crouch					Deckhand (ep 1–8)
Diana Cruz					Stewardess
Cloyce Martin					Chef
Davide Morosi					Chief Engineer
Danni Warren					Stewardess

== Episodes ==
=== Series overview ===
Season	Episodes	Originally released	
Season	Episodes	First released	Last released
1	18	February 3, 2020	May 25, 2020
2	18	March 1, 2021	June 28, 2021
3	18	February 21, 2022	June 20, 2022
4	19	April 10, 2023	July 18, 2023
5	16	October 7, 2024	January 27, 2025

=== Season 1 (2020) ===
No. overall	No. in season	Title	Original release date	U.S. viewers (millions)
1	1	"Holy Ship! We're Sailing!"	February 3, 2020	1.29
2	2	"My Big Fat Bleak Wedding"	February 10, 2020	1.06
3	3	"Rose-Fueled Regrets"	February 17, 2020	1.20
4	4	"Baby on Board"	February 24, 2020	1.24
5	5	"Shmexual Shmension"	March 2, 2020	0.92
6	6	"Oof! I Did It Again"	March 9, 2020	0.94
7	7	"Oooof There It Is"	March 16, 2020	1.14
8	8	"No Bra, No Shoes, Bad Service"	March 23, 2020	1.17
9	9	"Parker's Big Adventure"	March 30, 2020	1.15
10	10	"Big Deck Energy"	April 6, 2020	1.10
11	11	"May the Breast Man Win"	April 13, 2020	1.17
12	12	"New Chris on the Block"	April 20, 2020	1.16
13	13	"#Awkward"	April 27, 2020	1.34
14	14	"The Birds"	May 4, 2020	1.18
15	15	"You Snooze, You Lose"	May 11, 2020	1.27
16	16	"DOPE!"	May 18, 2020	1.16
17	17	"Regatta Go!"	May 25, 2020	1.26
18	18	"Reunion"	June 1, 2020	1.11

=== Season 2 (2021) ===
No. overall	No. in season	Title	Original release date	U.S. viewers (millions)
19	1	"Running on Fumes"	March 1, 2021	1.05
20	2	"Nookie Mistake"	March 8, 2021	1.09
21	3	"Smoldering Secrets"	March 15, 2021	0.92
22	4	"Barrie'd Alive"	March 22, 2021	1.04
23	5	"Hollandaze and Bustiers"	March 29, 2021	0.94
24	6	"Throuple Trouble"	April 5, 2021	0.99
25	7	"The Scorning After"	April 12, 2021	0.94
26	8	"Cake Shock"	April 19, 2021	1.02
27	9	"Panic on a Tack"	April 26, 2021	1.12
28	10	"Knotty Knotty"	May 3, 2021	1.11
29	11	"Crash Boom Bang!"	May 10, 2021	1.05
30	12	"Total Ship Show"	May 17, 2021	1.08
31	13	"Nip N Slide"	May 24, 2021	1.19
32	14	"No Shirt, No Clue, Big Problems"	May 31, 2021	1.00
33	15	"Sexual Heeling"	June 7, 2021	0.98
34	16	"Last Call for Parsifal"	June 14, 2021	1.01
35	17	"Reunion Part 1"	June 21, 2021	0.91
36	18	"Reunion Part 2"	June 22, 2021	0.79

=== Season 3 (2022) ===
No. overall	No. in season	Title	Original release date	U.S. viewers (millions)
37	1	"Tom Foolery"	February 21, 2022	0.95
38	2	"Age-Old Problems"	February 28, 2022	0.96
39	3	"Omelette You Finish but..."	March 7, 2022	0.95
40	4	"Oopsie Daisy"	March 14, 2022	0.95
41	5	"Loose Lips Sink Ships"	March 21, 2022	0.96
42	6	"Yacht on the Rocks"	March 28, 2022	1.04
43	7	"Strip for the Tip"	April 4, 2022	1.10
44	8	"Big Fender Energy"	April 11, 2022	1.03
45	9	"Tensions High, Patience Low"	April 18, 2022	0.92
46	10	"Villa Today, Gone Tomorrow"	April 25, 2022	1.08
47	11	"Paging Dr. Nipples"	May 9, 2022	1.01
48	12	"New Girl Aboard"	May 16, 2022	1.08
49	13	"Budding Boatmance"	May 23, 2022	1.19
50	14	"Smashley"	May 30, 2022	0.93
51	15	"Salty Seamen"	June 6, 2022	1.14
52	16	"Parsifal’s First Wedding"	June 13, 2022	1.03
53	17	"All Roads Lead to Gaisy"	June 20, 2022	1.17
54	18	"Reunion"	June 27, 2022	0.75

=== Season 4 (2023) ===
No. overall	No. in season	Title	Original release date	U.S. viewers (millions)
55	1	"ParsiFAIL"	April 10, 2023	0.81
56	2	"Worst Vacation Ever"	April 17, 2023	0.84
57	3	"The King Is Back"	April 24, 2023	0.84
58	4	"Lazy Daisy"	May 1, 2023	0.81
59	5	"Hate Me Tender"	May 8, 2023	0.75
60	6	"Clash & Burn"	May 15, 2023	0.76
61	7	"Smoke On The Water"	May 22, 2023	0.78
62	8	"Cheers to Boobies"	May 29, 2023	0.77
63	9	"Love Boat"	June 5, 2023	0.83
64	10	"Loose Lips Sink Friendships"	June 12, 2023	0.84
65	11	"Burnt Hands and Broken Hearts"	June 12, 2023	0.74
66	12	"Let Them Eat Cake"	June 19, 2023	0.85
67	13	"T-Bone With Stakes"	June 19, 2023	0.79
68	14	"Hurricane Bonnie"	June 26, 2023	0.82
69	15	"She Loves Me Not"	June 26, 2023	0.67
70	16	"Boat Load of Throuples"	July 10, 2023	0.81
71	17	"Man Buns it Has Been Fun"	July 10, 2023	0.71
72	18	"Reunion Part 1"	July 17, 2023	0.68
73	19	"Reunion Part 2"	July 18, 2023	0.62

=== Season 5 (2024–25) ===
No. overall	No. in season	Title	Original release date	U.S. viewers (millions)
74	1	"Ibiza, Baby!"	October 7, 2024	0.50
75	2	"Tender Bender"	October 14, 2024	0.55
76	3	"Let the Bottles Hit the Floor"	October 21, 2024	0.52
77	4	"Mer-made a Big Mis-cake"	October 28, 2024	0.47
78	5	"Bean Counter"	November 4, 2024	0.48
79	6	"Loose Lips Sink Trysts"	November 11, 2024	0.49
80	7	"My Super Sideways Sixteen"	November 18, 2024	0.49
81	8	"An Eye for a Decline"	November 25, 2024	0.51
82	9	"Out, Damned Spot"	December 2, 2024	0.53
83	10	"All Work and No Rosé"	December 9, 2024	0.50
84	11	"Much Ado About Crushing"	December 16, 2024	0.50
85	12	"Fraught Mess"	December 30, 2024	0.47
86	13	"Mid-Strife Crisis"	January 6, 2025	0.59
87	14	"Rules of En-rage-ment"	January 13, 2025	0.53
88	15	"Past the Boiling Point"	January 20, 2025	0.47
89	16	"The Bitter End"	January 27, 2025	0.59

== Controversies ==
=== Handling of complaints of sexual assault and misconduct ===
In August 2023, Samantha Suarez, a former makeup artist for both Below Deck and Sailing Yacht, came forward in a Rolling Stone article with claims that production had helped cover up the fact that star Gary King had tried to force himself on her during production of the fourth season of Sailing Yacht in the summer of 2022. When she accompanied an inebriated King to his hotel room, King "came up behind her, grabbed her, pressed her against his body, and refused to let go of her even though she says she tried to kick and elbow him to get him off her." When she got free, he then refused to let her open the door to his room until she received a call from one of the talent managers.

After the incident occurred, Suarez informed production, who then instructed King to sleep on the boat during non-filming days, after originally offering to fire King for his misconduct. Suarez also alleges that she should not have been put in the position she was regarding King's employment on the show, considering the limited agency and power her position on the show provided.

Two other production members also commented on King's behavior on set for the story, noting that he touched "a female cast member’s butt and continue[d] to touch her inappropriately even though she said, “No,” and told him to stop," as well as grabbing "production crew member's genitals" on two occasions while inebriated.
