= Below Deck =

American reality television series (2013–present)

- Genre: Reality
- Created by: Mark Cronin; Rebecca Taylor Henning; Doug Henning
- Country of origin: United States
- Original language: English
- No. of seasons: 13
- No. of episodes: 193 (list of episodes)

Production
- Executive producers: Mark Cronin; Courtland Cox; Nadine Rajabi; Lauren Simms; Rebecca Henning
- Running time: 42-54 minutes
- Production companies: 51 Minds Entertainment; Endemol

Original release
- Network: Bravo
- Release: July 1, 2013 – present

Related
- Below Deck Mediterranean; Below Deck Sailing Yacht; Below Deck Down Under; Below Deck Adventure

Below Deck is an American reality television series that premiered on Bravo on July 1, 2013. The show chronicles the lives of the crew members who work and reside aboard a superyacht during charter season.

The series has a number of spin-offs, including Below Deck Mediterranean, Below Deck Sailing Yacht, Below Deck Down Under, and Below Deck Adventure.

== Production ==
For the first season, producers booked a five-week Caribbean charter in Sint Maarten on the 164-foot (50 m) yacht Cuor di Leone. The yacht was renamed Honor for the purposes of filming, and was captained by Capt. Lee Rosbach. The original crew used for the vessel were given the time off, to be replaced by the cast of the series for the duration of filming. Rosbach and his first officer and engineer stayed on board the vessel to ensure everything went as planned. Chief stewardess Adrienne Gang, chef Ben Robinson and stewardess Kat Held had worked on yachts prior to the series. The series was shot over a six-week period in September and October 2011.

On August 27, 2013, Bravo announced that the series' first season averaged 1.4 million total viewers per episode. These figures led the network to renew Below Deck for a second season. The second season premiered on August 12, 2014, and featured four returning cast members from the previous season: Captain Lee Rosbach, Ben Robinson, Kat Held and Eddie Lucas. New cast additions included Kate Chastain, siblings Kelley and Amy Johnson, Jennice Ontiveros, Andrew Sturby, and Logan Reese. The second season had the crew working on Ohana, a 153-foot (47 m) yacht, during the charter season in the British Virgin Islands. The season concluded on November 4, 2014.

Bravo renewed Below Deck for a third season after the second-season finale, which was the highest rated episode of the season. In March 2015, Bravo announced a Below Deck spin-off show entitled Below Deck Mediterranean, which would feature a crew heading to "the world's oldest cruising grounds, the Mediterranean Sea, for its next superyacht charter season."

The third season premiered on August 25, 2015. The season followed crew members living and working in the Bahamas on a 161-foot (49 m) yacht called Eros. A sneak peek of the season was released on July 21, with a half-hour preview special which aired on August 10, 2015. The season featured Lee Rosbach, Kate Chastain, Amy Johnson and Eddie Lucas who all returned from the previous season, along with another five new crew members.

In April 2016, the network renewed Below Deck for a fourth season which was filmed in the US Virgin Islands.

On February 21, 2017, Bravo announced that production filming for season 5 had begun. On July 17, 2017, it was announced that the fifth season would premiere on September 5, 2017, with Lee Rosbach, Kate Chastain, and Nico Scholly returning. The series was filmed in Sint Maarten.

The sixth season premiered on October 2, 2018, and was filmed in Tahiti, French Polynesia. Lee Rosbach and Kate Chastain returned. In season 6 episode 11, Ashton Pienaar had a close brush with death when he got a tow line wrapped around his leg and was dragged into the water between the yacht My Seanna, which was underway, and the vessel's tender. The show's cameraman Brent Freeburg was able to save Ashton by freeing the tow line. If he had not completely freed the line, the tension between the vessel and the tender would have pulled it tight around Ashton's leg and severed his foot; he could have bled to death in seconds. Rosbach instituted strict procedures to keep this from happening again.

In March 2019, Bravo announced a new spin-off, Below Deck Sailing Yacht. The show follows a crew sailing aboard the sailing yacht, Parsifal III, as they cater to charter guests in Greece. On December 18, 2019, it was announced that the spin-off series would premiere on February 3, 2020.

On August 26, 2019, it was announced that the seventh season would premiere on October 7, 2019. Lee Rosbach, Kate Chastain, and Ashton Pienaar returned as crew members. The series was filmed in Phuket, Thailand.

On September 21, 2020, it was announced that the eighth season would premiere on November 2, 2020. Lee Rosbach and Eddie Lucas returned. The series was filmed in Antigua. The season was curtailed after the final two charters were cancelled due to the COVID-19 pandemic.

In May 2021, Peacock ordered a new spin-off, Below Deck Down Under. The series followed the upstairs and downstairs of a super-yacht in Australia. The series premiered on March 17, 2022.

On August 19, 2021, Bravo announced that a ninth season would premiere on October 25, 2021. The season again featured the yacht My Seanna, and was filmed in St. Kitts.

On May 12, 2022, Bravo announced the renewal of Below Deck and Below Deck Mediterranean, and also announced that a new spin-off, titled Below Deck Adventure, would premiere in late 2022.

On November 3, 2023, it was announced that the eleventh season would premiere on February 5, 2024.

In May 2026, the series was renewed for a thirteenth season. In September 2026, it was announced the season would premiere on October 12th, and will be set in Phuket, Thailand.

== Episodes ==
| Season | Episodes | Originally released | |
| Season | Episodes | First released | Last released |
|---|---|---|---|
| 1 | 11 | July 1, 2013 | September 9, 2013 |
| 2 | 13 | August 12, 2014 | November 4, 2014 |
| 3 | 15 | August 25, 2015 | December 1, 2015 |
| 4 | 14 | September 6, 2016 | December 6, 2016 |
| 5 | 15 | September 5, 2017 | December 12, 2017 |
| 6 | 17 | October 2, 2018 | February 5, 2019 |
| 7 | 20 | October 7, 2019 | February 17, 2020 |
| 8 | 17 | November 2, 2020 | February 22, 2021 |
| 9 | 15 | October 25, 2021 | February 7, 2022 |
| 10 | 17 | November 21, 2022 | March 20, 2023 |
| 11 | 17 | February 5, 2024 | May 27, 2024 |
| 12 | 16 | June 2, 2025 | September 15, 2025 |
| 13 | TBA | October 12, 2026 | TBA |

== Cast ==
The cast of the first season (from left): Ben Robinson, Aleks Taldykin, Kat Held, Adrienne Gang, David Bradberry, C.J. LeBeau, Samantha Orme and Eddie Lucas

=== Season 1: Honor ===
Yacht source:

- Lee Rosbach – Captain
- Aleks Taldykin – First Officer
- Ben Robinson – Chef
- Adrienne Gang – Chief Stew
- C.J. LeBeau – Second Engineer
- Kat Held – 2nd Stew
- Samantha Orme – 3rd Stew
- Eddie Lucas – First Deckhand
- David Bradberry – 2nd Deckhand

=== Season 2: Ohana ===
Yacht source:

- Lee Rosbach – Captain
- Ben Robinson – Chef
- Kate Chastain – Chief Stew
- Kat Held – 2nd Stew
- Amy Johnson – 3rd Stew
- Eddie Lucas – Bosun
- Kelley Johnson – Second Engineer
- Andrew Sturby – Deckhand (ep 1–4)
- Logan Reese – Deckhand (ep 8–11)
- Jennice Ontiveros – Deckhand

=== Season 3: Eros ===
Yacht source:

- Lee Rosbach – Captain
- Leon Walker – Chef (ep 1–10)
- Ben Robinson – Chef (ep 10–13)
- Kate Chastain – Chief Stew
- Amy Johnson – 2nd Stew
- Raquel “Rocky” Dakota – 3rd Stew
- Eddie Lucas – Bosun
- Don Abenante – Deckhand/Second Engineer (ep 1–4)
- Connie Arias – Deckhand
- Emile Kotze – Deckhand
- Dane Jackson – Deckhand (ep 5–8)
- David Bradberry – Deckhand (ep 11–13)

=== Season 4: Valor ===
Yacht source:

- Lee Rosbach – Captain
- Ben Robinson – Chef
- Kate Chastain – Chief Stew
- Emily Warburton-Adams – 2nd Stew
- Sierra Storm – 3rd Stew
- Kelley Johnson – Bosun
- Trevor Walker – Senior Deckhand/Second Engineer (ep 1–2), Deckhand (ep 3–4)
- Nico Scholly – Deckhand (ep 1–12), Senior Deckhand (ep 12–14)
- Lauren Burchell – Deckhand
- Kyle Dixon – Deckhand (ep 5–14)

=== Season 5: Valor ===
Yacht source:

- Lee Rosbach – Captain
- Matt Burns – Chef
- Kate Chastain – Chief Stew
- Brianna Adekeye – 2nd Stew
- Jen Howell – 3rd Stew
- EJ Jansen – Bosun (ep 5–11)
- Nico Scholly – Lead Deckhand (ep 1–14), Bosun (ep 14)
- Chris Brown – Deckhand (ep 1–6)
- Bruno Duarte – Deckhand
- Baker Manning – Deckhand
- Kyle Dixon – Deckhand (ep 11–14)

=== Season 6: My Seanna ===
Crew and yacht source:

- Lee Rosbach – Captain
- Adrian Martin – Chef
- Kate Chastain – Chief Stew
- Josiah Carter – 2nd Stew
- Caroline Bedol – 3rd Stew (ep 1–9)
- Laura Betancourt – 3rd Stew (ep 10–16)
- Chandler Brooks – Bosun (ep 1–9)
- Ross Inia – Lead Deckhand (ep 1–8), Bosun (ep 9–16)
- Ashton Pienaar – Deckhand
- Rhylee Gerber – Deckhand
- Tyler Rowland – Deckhand (ep 10–16)

=== Season 7: Valor ===
Crew and yacht source:

- Lee Rosbach – Captain
- Kevin Dobson – Chef
- Kate Chastain – Chief Stew
- Simone Mashile – 2nd Stew
- Courtney Skippon – 3rd Stew (ep 1–10), 2nd Stew (ep 11–18)
- Ashton Pienaar – Bosun
- Brian de Saint Pern – Lead Deckhand
- Tanner Sterback – Deckhand
- Abbi Murphy – Deckhand (ep 1–6)
- Rhylee Gerber – Deckhand (ep 8–18)

=== Season 8: My Seanna ===
Crew source:

- Lee Rosbach – Captain
- Rachel Hargrove – Chef
- Francesca Rubi – Chief Stew
- Elizabeth Frankini – Stew (ep 1–3), 2nd Stew (ep 3–8), Stew (ep 9–16)
- Ashling Lorger – 3rd Stew (ep 3–8), Stew (ep 9–16)
- Isabelle "Izzy" Wouters – Stew (ep 1–3), Deckhand (ep 3–13), Lead Deckhand (ep 13–16)
- Eddie Lucas – Bosun (ep 1–16), First Officer (ep 16)
- James Hough – Deckhand
- Shane Coopersmith – Deckhand (ep 1–7)
- Avery Russell – Deckhand (ep 1)
- Robert Phillips – Deckhand (ep 8–16)

=== Season 9: My Seanna ===
- Sean Meagher – Captain (ep 1–2)
- Lee Rosbach – Captain (ep 2–15)
- Eddie Lucas – First Officer
- Rachel Hargrove – Chef
- Heather Chase – Chief Stew
- Fraser Olender – 2nd Stew
- Jessica Albert – 3rd Stew (ep 1–9)
- Kaylee Milligan – 3rd Stew (ep 12–15)
- Jake Foulger – Deckhand (ep 1–3), Lead Deckhand (ep 3–15)
- Rayna Lindsey – Deckhand
- Wes O'Dell – Deckhand

=== Season 10: St. David ===
- Lee Rosbach – Captain (ep 1–5, 14–17)
- Sandra "Sandy" Yawn – Captain (ep 5–14)
- Rachel Hargrove – Chef
- Fraser Olender – Chief Stew
- Alissa Humber – 2nd Stew (ep 1–13)
- Leigh-Ann Smith – 2nd Stew (ep 14–17)
- Hayley De Sola Pinto – 3rd Stew
- Camille Lamb – Deck/Stew (ep 1–6), Stew (ep 6–9)
- Tyler Walker – Deck/Stew (ep 10–17)
- Ross McHarg – Bosun
- Ben Willoughby – Deckhand (ep 1–4), Lead Deckhand (ep 5–17)
- Katie Glaser – Deckhand
- Luis Antonio "Tony" Duarte – Deckhand

=== Season 11: St. David ===
Crew source:

- Kerry Titheradge – Captain
- Anthony Iracane – Chef (ep 1–12)
- Nick Tatlock – Chef (ep 13–17)
- Fraser Olender – Chief Stew
- Xandi Olivier – Stew (ep 1–4), 2nd Stew (ep 5–17)
- Barbie Pascual – Stew
- Cat Baugh – Stew (ep 1–7)
- Paris Field – Stew (ep 10–17)
- Jared Woodin – Bosun (ep 1–7)
- Ben Willoughby – Lead Deckhand (ep 1–7), Bosun (ep 7–17)
- Marie "Sunny" Marquis – Deckhand (ep 1–11), Lead Deckhand (ep 11–17)
- Kyle Stillie – Deckhand
- Dylan Pierre De Villiers – Deckhand (ep 8–17)

=== Season 12: St. David ===
Crew and yacht source:

- Kerry Titheradge – Captain
- Lawrence Snowden – Chef (ep 1–3)
- Anthony Iracane – Chef (ep 2–16)
- Fraser Olender – Chief Stew
- Rainbeau de Roos – 2nd Stew
- Solène Favreau – Stew
- Barbara Kulaif – Stew
- Caio Poltronieri – Bosun (ep 1–6)
- Hugo Ortega – Bosun (ep 6–16)
- Jess Theron – Lead Deckhand
- Kyle Stillie – Deckhand
- Damo Yorg – Deckhand

=== Season 13: Azul V ===
Crew and yacht source:

- Kerry Titheradge – Captain
- Moe Vilomar – Chef
- Fraser Olender – Chief Stew
- Rainbeau de Roos – 2nd Stew
- Kaylee Brown – Stew
- Rosa Simms-Preston – Stew
- Alex Wright – Bosun (ep 1–6), Lead Deckhand (ep 6–)
- James Bishop – Deckhand
- Matthew Fitzpatrick-Buck – Lead Deckhand (ep 1–6), Bosun (ep 6–)
- Jessenia Stidger – Deckhand

=== Timeline ===
| Cast Members | Seasons | | | | | | | | | | | | |
| Cast Members | 1 | 2 | 3 | 4 | 5 | 6 | 7 | 8 | 9 | 10 | 11 | 12 | 13 |
|---|---|---|---|---|---|---|---|---|---|---|---|---|---|
| David Bradberry | Deckhand | | Deckhand | | | | | | | | | | |
| Adrienne Gang | Chief Stew | Guest | | | | | | | | | | | |
| Kat Held | 2nd Stew | | | | | | | | | | | | |
| C.J. LeBeau | 2nd Engineer | | | | | | | | | | | | |
| Eddie Lucas | Lead Deckhand | Bosun | Bosun | | | | | Bosun/First Officer | Bosun/First Officer | | | | |
| Samantha Orme | 3rd Stew | | | | | | | | | | | | |
| Ben Robinson | Chef | Chef | Chef | Chef | | | | | | | | | |
| Lee Rosbach | Captain | Captain | Captain | Captain | Captain | Captain | Captain | Captain | Captain | Captain | | | |
| Aleks Taldykin | First Officer | | | | | | | | | | | | |
| Kate Chastain | | Chief Stew | Chief Stew | Chief Stew | Chief Stew | Chief Stew | Chief Stew | | | | | | |
| Amy Johnson | | 3rd Stew | 2nd Stew | Guest | | | | | | | | | |
| Kelley Johnson | | 2nd Engineer/Deckhand | Guest | Bosun | | | | | | | | | |
| Jennice Ontiveros | | Deckhand | | | | | | | | | | | |
| Logan Reese | | Deckhand | | | | | | | | | | | |
| Andrew Sturby | | Deckhand | | | | | | | | | | | |
| Don Abenante | | | 2nd Engineer/Deckhand | | | | | | | | | | |
| Connie Arias | | | Deckhand | | | | | | | | | | |
| Raquel "Rocky" Dakota | | | 3rd Stew | | | | | | | | | | |
| Dane Jackson | | | Deckhand | | | | | | | | | | |
| Emile Kotze | | | Deckhand | | | | | | | | | | |
| Leon Walker | | | Chef | | | | | | | | | | |
| Lauren Burchell | | | | Deckhand | | | | | | | | | |
| Kyle Dixon | | | | Deckhand | Deckhand | | | | | | | | |
| Nico Scholly | | | | Deckhand | Lead Deckhand/Bosun | | | | | | | | |
| Sierra Storm | | | | 3rd Stew | | | | | | | | | |
| Trevor Walker | | | | Lead Deckhand | | | | | | | | | |
| Emily Warburton-Adams | | | | 2nd Stew | | | | | | | | | |
| Brianna Adekeye | | | | | 2nd Stew | | | | | | | | |
| Chris Brown | | | | | Deckhand | | | | | | | | |
| Matt Burns | | | | | Chef | | | | | | | | |
| Bruno Duarte | | | | | Deckhand | | | | | | | | |
| Jennifer Howell | | | | | 3rd Stew | | | | | | | | |
| EJ Jansen | | | | | Bosun | | | | | | | | |
| Baker Manning | | | | | Deckhand | | | | | | | | |
| Caroline Bedol | | | | | | 3rd Stew | | | | | | | |
| Laura Betancourt | | | | | | 3rd Stew | | | | | | | |
| Chandler Brooks | | | | | | Bosun | | | | | | | |
| Josiah Carter | | | | | | 2nd Stew | | | | | | | |
| Rhylee Gerber | | | | | | Deckhand | Deckhand | | | | | | |
| Ross Inia | | | | | | Deckhand/Bosun | | | | | | | |
| Adrian Martin | | | | | | Chef | | | | | | | |
| Ashton Pienaar | | | | | | Deckhand | Bosun | | | | | | |
| Tyler Rowland | | | | | | Deckhand | | | | | | | |
| Kevin Dobson | | | | | | | Chef | | | | | | |
| Simone Mashile | | | | | | | 2nd Stew | | | | | | |
| Abbi Murphy | | | | | | | Deckhand | | | | | | |
| Brian de Saint Pern | | | | | | | Deckhand | | | | | | |
| Courtney Skippon | | | | | | | 3rd/2nd Stew | | | | | | |
| Tanner Sterback | | | | | | | Deckhand | | | | | | |
| Shane Coopersmith | | | | | | | | Deckhand | | | | | |
| Elizabeth Frankini | | | | | | | | 2nd/3rd Stew | | | | | |
| Rachel Hargrove | | | | | | | | Chef | Chef | Chef | | | |
| James Hough | | | | | | | | Deckhand | | | | | |
| Ashling Lorger | | | | | | | | 3rd/2nd Stew | | | | | |
| Robert Phillips | | | | | | | | Deckhand | | | | | |
| Francesca Rubi | | | | | | | | Chief Stew | | | | | |
| Avery Russell | | | | | | | | Deckhand | | | | | |
| Isabelle "Izzy" Wouters | | | | | | | | Stew/Deckhand/Lead Deckhand | | | | | |
| Jessica Albert | | | | | | | | | 3rd Stew | | | | |
| Heather Chase | | | | | | | | | Chief Stew | | | | |
| Jake Foulger | | | | | | | | | Deckhand/Lead Deckhand | | | | |
| Rayna Lindsey | | | | | | | | | Deckhand | | | | |
| Sean Meagher | | | | | | | | | Captain | | | | |
| Kaylee Milligan | | | | | | | | | 3rd Stew | | | | |
| Wes O'Dell | | | | | | | | | Deckhand | | | | |
| Fraser Olender | | | | | | | | | 2nd Stew | Chief Stew | Chief Stew | Chief Stew | Chief Stew |
| Hayley De Sola Pinto | | | | | | | | | | 3rd Stew | | | |
| Luis Antonio "Tony" Duarte | | | | | | | | | | Deckhand | | | |
| Katie Glaser | | | | | | | | | | Deckhand | | | |
| Alissa Humber | | | | | | | | | | 2nd Stew | | | |
| Camille Lamb | | | | | | | | | | Deckhand/Stew | Guest | | |
| Ross McHarg | | | | | | | | | | Bosun | | | |
| Leigh-Ann Smith | | | | | | | | | | 2nd Stew | | | |
| Tyler Walker | | | | | | | | | | Deckhand/Stew | | | |
| Ben Willoughby | | | | | | | | | | Deckhand/Lead Deckhand | Lead Deckhand/Bosun | | |
| Sandra "Sandy" Yawn | | | | | | | | | | Captain | | | |
| Cat Baugh | | | | | | | | | | | Stew | | |
| Dylan De Villiers | | | | | | | | | | | Deckhand | | |
| Paris Field | | | | | | | | | Guest | | Stew | | |
| Anthony Iracane | | | | | | | | | | | Chef | Chef | |
| Marie "Sunny" Marquis | | | | | | | | | | | Deckhand/Lead Deckhand | | |
| Xandi Olivier | | | | | | | | | | | 2nd Stew | | |
| Barbie Pascual | | | | | | | | | | | Stew | | |
| Kyle Stillie | | | | | | | | | | | Deckhand | Deckhand | |
| Nick Tatlock | | | | | | | | | | | Chef | | |
| Kerry Titheradge | | | | | | | | | | | Captain | Captain | Captain |
| Jared Woodin | | | | | | | | | | | Bosun | | |
| Solène Favreau | | | | | | | | | | | | Stew | |
| Barbara Kulaif | | | | | | | | | | | | Stew | |
| Hugo Ortega | | | | | | | | | | | | Bosun | |
| Caio Poltronieri | | | | | | | | | | | | Bosun | |
| Rainbeau de Roos | | | | | | | | | | | | 2nd Stew | |
| Lawrence Snowden | | | | | | | | | | | | Chef | |
| Jess Theron | | | | | | | | | | | | Lead Deckhand | |
| Damo Yorg | | | | | | | | | | | | Deckhand | |
| James Bishop | | | | | | | | | | | | | Deckhand |
| Kaylee Brown | | | | | | | | | | | | | Stew |
| Matthew Fitzpatrick-Buck | | | | | | | | | | | | | Lead Deckhand/Bosun |
| Rosa Simms-Preston | | | | | | | | | | | | | Stew |
| Jessenia Stidger | | | | | | | | | | | | | Deckhand |
| Moe Vilomar | | | | | | | | | | | | | Chef |
| Alex Wright | | | | | | | | | | | | | Bosun/Lead Deckhand |

== Reception ==
"I'm calling it Saved by the Bell, the Summer Edition: Lost at Sea. (Imagine a very special episode in which one of the Bayside crew finds a baggie of coke on the volleyball court at Malibu Sands and then hands it over to Stacy Carosi. Well, anyone except Jessie Spano, because we all know she'd be so excited that she'd keep it.) But there's plenty of time to get all royal about it. For now, I'm hooked, at the bottom of the sea."

— Annie Barrett from Entertainment Weekly

The reality show has received mixed reviews from television critics. David Hinckley from the New York Daily News gave a negative review, remarking that Bravo "make[s] waves with reality series set on a luxury yacht, but viewers aren't well served by a show that's anchored in tedium." Reviewing the first episode of the show, he was not impressed by the lack of storylines and called the premiere "pretty mundane". Emily Yahr, a critic from The Washington Post, questioned the show's truthfulness and added that the series "seem[s] so scripted—the stereotypical spoiled crew members, the neatly wrapped-up “plotlines”—that it's hard to take seriously, even in the dubious cable reality show genre." Rob Owen of the Pittsburgh Post-Gazette was more positive by describing the show as a "fairly entertaining, voyeuristic look at a made-for-reality-TV crew."

David Wiegand, writing for the San Francisco Chronicle, noted the show's idea by saying that Below Deck "takes the idea of disparate types thrown together in a controlled environment and capitalizes on two seemingly inevitable results: friction and sexual tension". Neil Genzlinger from The New York Times criticized the casting choices, writing that "the real issue with this series is that the crew members aren't all that interesting." He also felt that "it's not actually the crew members—the stars of this series—who are unbearable" but the guests, for whom "the word “insufferable” was invented." Sandy Malone, writing for The Huffington Post in September 2014, questioned whether the show is hurting the yachting industry. Malone said, "My conclusion, if this show is going to do positive things for the yachting industry, instead of destroying its reputation for stellar service, a big change had better come with [the upcoming season]."

=== Ratings ===
Below Deck : U.S. viewers per episode (millions)

| Season | Episode number | | | | | | | | | | | | | | | | | | | | Average |
| Season | 1 | 2 | 3 | 4 | 5 | 6 | 7 | 8 | 9 | 10 | 11 | 12 | 13 | 14 | 15 | 16 | 17 | 18 | 19 | 20 | Average |
|---|---|---|---|---|---|---|---|---|---|---|---|---|---|---|---|---|---|---|---|---|---|
| 1 | 1.08 | 1.23 | 1.17 | 1.32 | 1.34 | 1.43 | 1.40 | 1.55 | 1.75 | 1.24 | 0.91 | – | | | | | | | | | 1.31 |
| 2 | 1.06 | 0.85 | 0.89 | 0.96 | 1.14 | 1.23 | 1.08 | 1.13 | 1.19 | 1.13 | 1.43 | 0.83 | 0.98 | – | | | | | | | 1.07 |
| 3 | 1.08 | 1.03 | 1.14 | 1.12 | 1.11 | 1.12 | 1.27 | 1.17 | 1.28 | 1.46 | 1.47 | 1.48 | 1.72 | 1.25 | 1.29 | – | | | | | 1.27 |
| 4 | 1.41 | 1.37 | 1.11 | 1.44 | 1.41 | 1.56 | 1.52 | 1.31 | 1.46 | 1.27 | 1.46 | 1.45 | 1.53 | 1.42 | – | | | | | | 1.41 |
| 5 | 1.32 | 0.97 | 1.25 | 1.16 | 1.25 | 1.36 | 1.34 | 1.28 | 1.20 | 1.30 | 1.39 | 1.30 | 1.46 | 1.56 | 0.90 | – | | | | | 1.27 |
| 6 | 1.27 | 1.21 | 1.22 | 1.39 | 1.39 | 1.32 | 1.35 | 1.40 | 1.67 | 1.81 | 2.11 | 1.64 | 1.45 | 0.53 | 1.61 | 1.69 | 1.24 | – | | | 1.43 |
| 7 | 1.41 | 1.38 | 1.43 | 1.50 | 1.53 | 1.43 | 1.55 | 1.49 | 1.66 | 1.69 | 1.68 | 1.39 | 1.72 | 1.58 | 1.71 | 1.72 | 1.74 | 1.75 | 1.59 | 1.20 | 1.56 |
| 8 | 1.20 | 1.40 | 1.46 | 1.37 | 1.38 | 1.47 | 1.55 | 1.61 | 1.56 | 1.56 | 1.60 | 1.67 | 1.55 | 1.59 | 1.47 | 1.65 | 1.22 | – | | | 1.49 |
| 9 | 1.36 | 1.26 | 1.20 | 1.40 | 1.18 | 1.21 | 1.22 | 1.32 | 1.25 | 1.21 | 1.27 | 1.26 | 1.34 | 1.29 | – | | | | | | 1.27 |
| 10 | 0.85 | 0.92 | 0.85 | 0.80 | 1.18 | 0.98 | 1.08 | 1.10 | 1.26 | 1.20 | 1.15 | 1.09 | 1.26 | 1.12 | 1.16 | 1.07 | 1.14 | – | | | 1.07 |
| 11 | 0.82 | 0.83 | 0.73 | 0.82 | 0.72 | 0.74 | 0.76 | 0.74 | 0.78 | 0.75 | 0.74 | 0.77 | 0.80 | 0.76 | 0.75 | 0.89 | 0.83 | – | | | 0.78 |
| 12 | 0.57 | 0.61 | 0.61 | 0.62 | 0.60 | 0.59 | 0.64 | 0.55 | 0.56 | 0.64 | 0.75 | 0.69 | 0.63 | 0.56 | 0.60 | 0.59 | – | | | | 0.61 |

Audience measurement performed by Nielsen Media Research

== Broadcast ==
Below Deck premiered on the Bravo cable network in the United States; the first episode debuted on Monday at 10:00/9:00 ET/PT on July 1, 2013. The preview special of the series aired on June 10, 2013. The first season ran for eleven episodes and concluded on September 9, 2013. The second season of the reality series debuted on August 12, 2014, and ended on November 4, 2014, after airing thirteen episodes. Both seasons featured a "Reunion" episode that reunited all the crew members to discuss the events of the season, as well as a special episode, "The Crew Tells All" with unseen footage of the season. The third season premiered on August 25, 2015, and concluded on December 1, 2015, with a two-part "Reunion" episode. Season 4 premiered on September 6, 2016, and concluded on December 6, 2016. The fifth season premiered on September 5, 2017, and concluded on December 5, 2017, with a "Reunion" episode airing on December 12, 2017. Season 6 premiered on October 2, 2018, and concluded on January 29, 2019, with a "Reunion" episode airing on February 5, 2019.

Both Below Deck and Below Deck Mediterranean appeared on the Canadian E! network for the first five seasons. For these seasons, the Canadian E! network would often air the seasons in the same time slot as in the US, however not all seasons followed the Bravo US schedule. Starting in season 6, Below Deck and Below Deck Mediterranean were picked up by the Canadian Slice network and all shows aired in the identical time slot as in the US on Bravo. As the network's parent Corus Entertainment ended its contract to carry Bravo shows in 2024, following the conclusion of their ongoing seasons for its other shows from its US network, the Below Deck franchise was migrated to the Rogers-owned new version of Canadian counterpart (no confusion to its original Canadian network under a different owner) starting with its twelfth season.

In September 2026, NBCUniversal Syndication Studios begin to offer reruns of Below Deck (older seasons only) in US broadcast syndication, airing it on local stations. This marks the second time NBCU had syndicated Bravo shows to local stations; the first was The Real Housewives, which entered syndication in 2010 and lasted for a year.

== See also ==
- Billion Dollar Playground
