= Bravo (American TV network) =

American pay television channel

- Logo used since 2017 with 2024 version featuring color gradient.
- Country: United States
- Broadcast area: Nationwide
- Headquarters: Comcast Building, New York City

Programming
- Language: English
- Picture format: 1080i HDTV (downscaled to letterboxed 480i for the SDTV feed)

Ownership
- Owner: NBCUniversal (Comcast)
- Parent: NBCUniversal Media Group
- Sister channels: List: Cozi TV; NBC; NBCSN; NBC True CRMZ; Telemundo; TeleXitos

History
- Launched: December 8, 1980; 45 years ago

Links
- Website: www.bravotv.com

Availability

Streaming media
- Affiliated Streaming Service(s): Peacock
- Services: DirecTV Stream, FuboTV, Hulu + Live TV, Sling TV, YouTube TV

Bravo is an American basic cable television network, launched on December 8, 1980. It is owned by the NBCUniversal Media Group division of Comcast's NBCUniversal. The channel originally focused on programming related to fine arts and film. Since the 2000s, it has focused heavily on reality series targeted at 25-54 year-old women and the LGBTQ community at large. As of November 2023, Bravo is available to approximately 70 million pay television households in the United States, down from its 2013 peak of 95 million households.

== History ==
=== Launch and early programming ===
Bravo originally launched as a commercial-free premium channel on December 8, 1980. It was originally co-owned by Cablevision's Rainbow Media division and Warner-Amex Satellite Entertainment; the channel claimed to be "the first television service dedicated to film and the performing arts". The channel originally broadcast exclusively on Sunday and Monday nights and—like Bravo's former part-sister network (via Warner-Amex) Nickelodeon, which shared its channel space with Alpha Repertory Television Service—shared its channel space with the adult-oriented pay channel Escapade (now Playboy TV), which originally launched under the Bravo name in July 1979, and featured R-rated B movies (of the action, grindhouse and horror genres) and softcore pornographic films. In 1981, Bravo was available to 48,000 subscribers throughout the United States; this total increased four years later to around 350,000 subscribers. A 1985 profile of Bravo in The New York Times observed that most of its programming consisted of international, classic, and independent film. Celebrities such as E. G. Marshall and Roberta Peters provided opening and closing commentary to the films broadcast on the channel.

Performing arts programs seen on Bravo included the show Jazz Counterpoint. During the mid-1980s, Bravo converted from a premium service into a basic cable channel, although it remained a commercial-free service. Bravo signed an underwriting deal with Texaco in 1992 and within a month broadcast the first Texaco Showcase production, a stage adaptation of Romeo and Juliet. By the mid-1990s, Bravo began to incorporate more PBS-style underwriting sponsorships, and then began accepting traditional commercial advertising by 1998.

In the Encyclopedia of Television, Megan Mullen perceived certain Bravo programs as "considered too risky or eclectic for mainstream channels". Those programs were Karaoke and Cold Lazarus, the final serials by British playwright Dennis Potter shown by Bravo in June 1997, and Michael Moore's documentary series The Awful Truth from 1999.

=== Acquisition by NBC, shift to reality ===
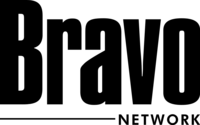
Bravo logo (1991–2005)

In 1999, Metro-Goldwyn-Mayer acquired a 20% stake in the channel, which it subsequently sold back to Rainbow Media in 2001. National Broadcasting Company, Inc. bought the network in 2002 for $1.25 billion; it had owned a stake in the channel and its sister networks for several years up to that point. NBC's then-parent company, General Electric, merged the network and its other broadcast and cable properties with Vivendi Universal Entertainment in May 2004 to form NBC Universal.

In 2003, Bravo began airing reruns of The West Wing for several years, including running marathons on certain holidays.

Bravo saw a massive success in 2003 with the reality series Queer Eye for the Straight Guy, which garnered 3.5 million viewers. The network began to add more reality shows to its lineup, some of them also very successful, including Project Runway in 2004, and Million Dollar Listing, The Real Housewives of Orange County and Top Chef, all in 2006. All spawned numerous spin-off shows, and some even turned into international franchises. The success of all these shows led Bravo to change its format from focusing on performing arts, drama, and independent film to being focused on reality series, pop culture, fashion and celebrities. In 2009, Entertainment Weekly put "Bravo reality shows" on its end-of-the-decade "best-of" list, saying, "From Queer Eye for the Straight Guy's Fab Five to Project Runway's fierce fashionistas to the kvetching, perma-tanned Real Housewives franchise, Bravo's quirky reality programming mixes high culture and low scruples to create deliciously addictive television."

Bravo logo (2005–2017)

A study released in May 2008 ranked Bravo as the brand most identified as gay-friendly among gay consumers. Bravo's age demographic is people 18–54, according to the Cable Television Advertising Bureau's cable television profiles.

Other successful reality series followed, including Shahs of Sunset (2012), Vanderpump Rules (2013), Married to Medicine (2013), Below Deck (2013), Southern Charm (2014), and Summer House (2017). Bravo's first ever scripted series, Girlfriends' Guide to Divorce, premiered in 2014 and ran until 2018.

On February 7, 2017, coinciding with the premiere of another scripted series, Imposters, Bravo updated its imaging with a refresh to its speech bubble-inspired logo, with the letters now all rendered in lowercase (replacing the wordmark text based on the logos used by the channel between 1994 and 2005), and a neutralized imaging to attract more male viewers. The "...by Bravo" marketing tag was also phased out from general use.

On November 20, 2024, Comcast announced that it would spin off most of NBCUniversal's cable networks and selected digital properties into a new publicly traded company known as Versant, (formerly referred to as "SpinCo" until May 2025) owned by Comcast shareholders, with NBCUniversal Media Group chairman Mark Lazarus as CEO. Bravo was notably excluded from the spin-off, due to its position as a major content provider for NBCUniversal's streaming service Peacock.

On June 29, 2026, Comcast announced that it would spin-off NBCUniversal (including Bravo) into a new publicly traded company with Comcast's co-CEO Mike Cavanaugh as CEO.

== Controversies ==
In August 2023, several of the network's reality stars, including Bethenny Frankel, Raquel Leviss, Lisa Rinna, and many others, accused Bravo and its parent company, NBCUniversal, of mistreating them and creating a hostile working environment for them. Frankel has also filed a lawsuit against the network and NBC as a result of the allegations.

In January 2024, Caroline Manzo filed a lawsuit against Bravo which alleged that the network and its affiliated companies—Forest Productions, Warner Bros. Entertainment, NBCUniversal Media, Shed Media and Peacock TV— would "regularly ply the Real Housewives cast with alcohol, cause them to become severely intoxicated, and then direct, encourage and/or allow them to sexually harass other cast members because that is good for ratings." The lawsuit was filed a year after it was reported Brandi Glanville gave Manzo "unwanted kisses" while they participated in season 5 of The Real Housewives Ultimate Girls Trip. The lawsuit also accused Bravo of knowing that Glanville had a history of sexual misconduct, but hired her anyway for good ratings.

In February 2024, former The Real Housewives of New York City cast member Leah McSweeney filed a lawsuit against Bravo, NBCUniversal, and executive producer Andy Cohen alleging discrimination, retaliation, and a hostile work environment. The lawsuit claimed that producers knowingly exacerbated her alcohol use disorder to create dramatic content and fostered a workplace culture that encouraged substance use. In March 2026, a federal judge ruled that the case would proceed in public court rather than private arbitration.

In 2025, former Below Deck cast member Emile Kotze filed a federal lawsuit against NBCUniversal and affiliated production entities alleging sexual harassment, manipulation, and reputational harm related to his portrayal on the show. The complaint also alleged that production practices, including the use of alcohol and constructed scenarios, contributed to the alleged misconduct. A judge later allowed aspects of the case to proceed.

== Programming ==
Bravo's programming schedule primarily includes originally produced programming, particularly reality content. Most popularly, the channel is known for its TV franchises The Real Housewives and Inside the Actors Studio, as well as Top Chef, Project Runway, Flipping Out, Below Deck, Married to Medicine, and Ladies of London. The channel also airs reruns of series from parent network NBC and occasionally other NBCUniversal-owned networks, off-network series, including those from NBCUniversal Television Distribution, and feature films, primarily from the Universal Pictures catalog. Bravo utilizes block programming for both new shows and existing ones such as its "Fashion By Bravo" block.

Following its acquisition by NBC, Bravo began to supplement NBC Sports coverage of the Olympic Games, airing live events during the overnight and morning hours during the 2004 Summer Olympics; this coverage continued with the 2006 Winter Olympics. The channel carried no coverage during the 2008 games, as NBC Universal had acquired Oxygen, allowing Bravo to continue to carry its regular programming schedule during NBC coverage of the Games. In 2012, the network served as the near-exclusive home for the Games' tennis tournament at Wimbledon, with up to 56 hours of coverage except for the men's and women's singles finals, which aired on NBC. During the 2016 Rio Olympics, Bravo served as the exclusive home of the entire tennis tournament.

== International versions ==
=== Australia ===
An Australian channel called Arena rebranded its on-air presentation in 2008 to align with Bravo as a result of an agreement with Bravo Media. Arena uses the now-former Bravo slogan "Watch What Happens" and has access to Bravo-produced programming. As of July 2020, the channel had dropped the Bravo-inspired branding, and added content from other providers such as WarnerMedia. In October 2022, it was announced that Australia's Seven Network would launch a local version of the network, titled 7Bravo on 15 January 2023, as part of a joint venture with NBCU.

=== Canada ===
A Canadian version of Bravo was launched in 1995 by CHUM Limited. The channel originally aired much of the same arts-focused genres of programming then aired by its American counterpart. Around the same period of its U.S. counterpart's channel drift, though particularly after its acquisition by Bell Media, Bravo Canada would pivot its focus toward television dramas, and was later rebranded as CTV Drama Channel in 2019, which aligned it with the branding of the CTV Television Network.

Most of Bravo's original programming would be acquired by other Canadian speciality channels and domestic platforms. Corus Entertainment's Slice and Food Network Canada would acquire such shows as The Real Housewives franchise and Top Chef, respectively, and would also commission domestic adaptations (The Real Housewives of Vancouver and Toronto; Top Chef Canada) of these franchises. In 2018, NBCUniversal's streaming service Hayu, would launch in Canada; and feature several shows and franchises from Bravo and its siblings.

On June 10, 2024, Rogers Sports & Media announced that it had acquired Canadian rights to the Bravo brand and original programming, and that it planned to relaunch the network in September 2024, with Rogers later announcing that Bravo would replace OLN (a channel originally established as the Canadian version of a different now-defunct Comcast network).

=== New Zealand ===
MediaWorks New Zealand announced that it would close the youth-oriented free to air channel Four in July 2016 and replace it with Bravo as part of a deal with NBCUniversal. The New Zealand channel is currently co-owned by Sky Network Television, through its subsidiary Sky Free. Sky purchased Warner Bros. Discovery's New Zealand free-to-air assets in late July 2025.

=== Brazil ===
A Brazilian version of Bravo was launched in 1996 by a partnership between TVA - then Grupo Abril's television arm -, TV Cultura and the original American network. The channel produced original programming like the Brazilian version of Inside Actors Studio called Studio Brasil. In August 1999, Bravo was rebranded as Film&Arts after Bravo Networks took full control of channel's administration.

=== Africa ===
The African version of Bravo was officially launched on October 7, 2025, replacing E! Africa. The channel offers NBCUniversal's global reality programming, including shows like The Real Housewives of London and Dating #No Filter South Africa - Season 2 and is available on DStv South Africa and Sub-Saharan Africa region, which is owned by MultiChoice and Canal+ S.A.

=== France ===
The French version of Bravo was officially launched on March 17, 2026, replacing E! France.

== Bravo's A-List Awards ==
In 2008, Bravo's A-List Awards were created to honor celebrities "who have made an unforgettable mark" in various fields of pop culture such as beauty, design, fashion, and cooking.
