= List of The Real Housewives cast members =

The Real Housewives is an international reality television franchise that consists of 12 installments in the United States, primarily broadcast on the television network Bravo and the streaming service Peacock, and 20 international installments, broadcast on various networks.

The American franchise began on March 21, 2006 with The Real Housewives of Orange County, and has expanded across New York City, Atlanta, New Jersey, D.C., Beverly Hills, Miami, Potomac, Dallas, Salt Lake City, Dubai, and Rhode Island.

As of September 2026, a total of 195 housewives have been featured on the American installments originated in the United States, several of whom have received spin-offs from their respective shows.

The American franchise has inspired many multiple shows across the world as international installments. The international franchise began in 2011 with The Real Housewives of Athens, and has expanded across Vancouver, Les Vraies Housewives, Melbourne, Cheshire, Auckland, Sydney, Toronto, Hungary, Johannesburg, Naples, Jersey, Durban, Slovenija: Vražje dame, Lagos, Amsterdam, Pretoria, Cape Town, Cape Winelands, Rome, Antwerp, South Netherlands, London, Rotterdam and Warsaw.

== American installments ==
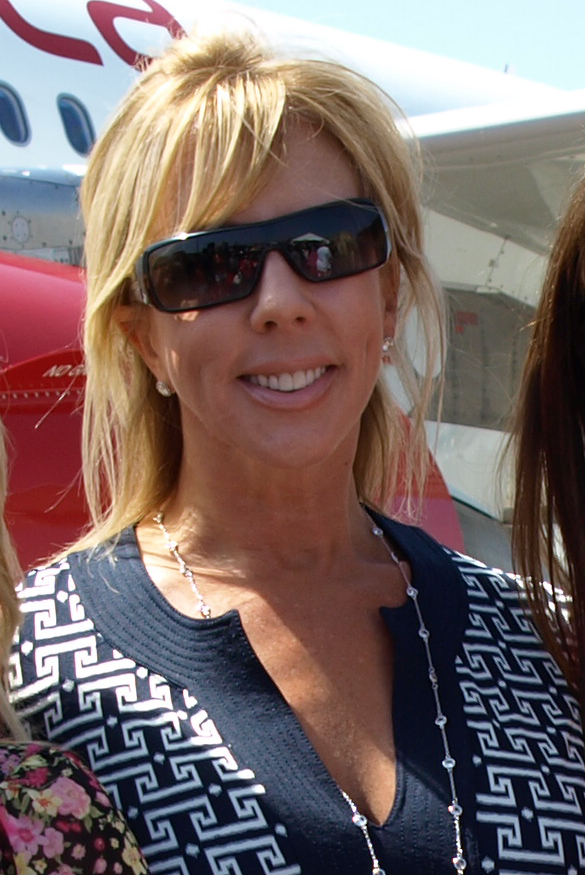
Vicki Gunvalson

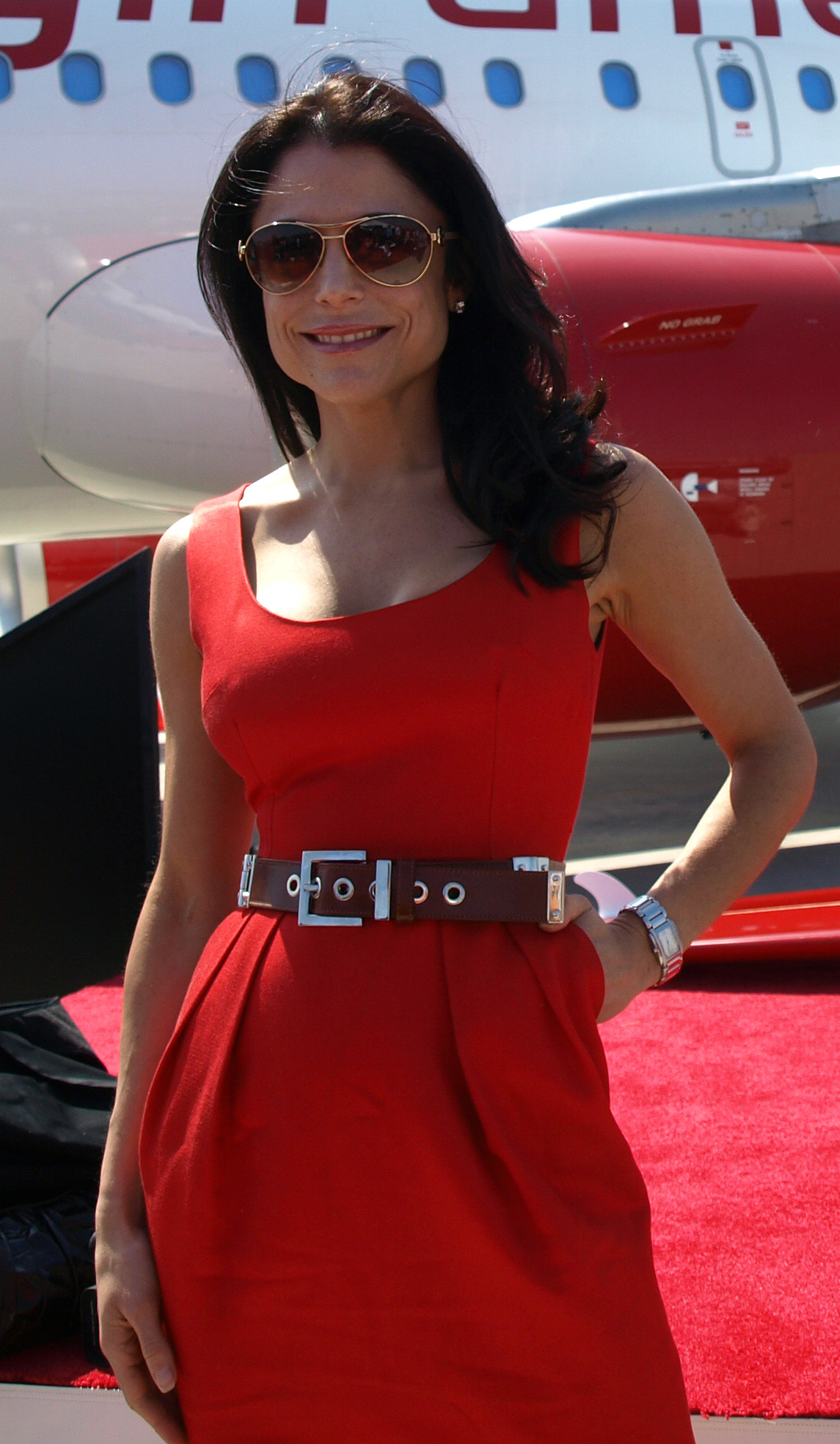
Bethenny Frankel

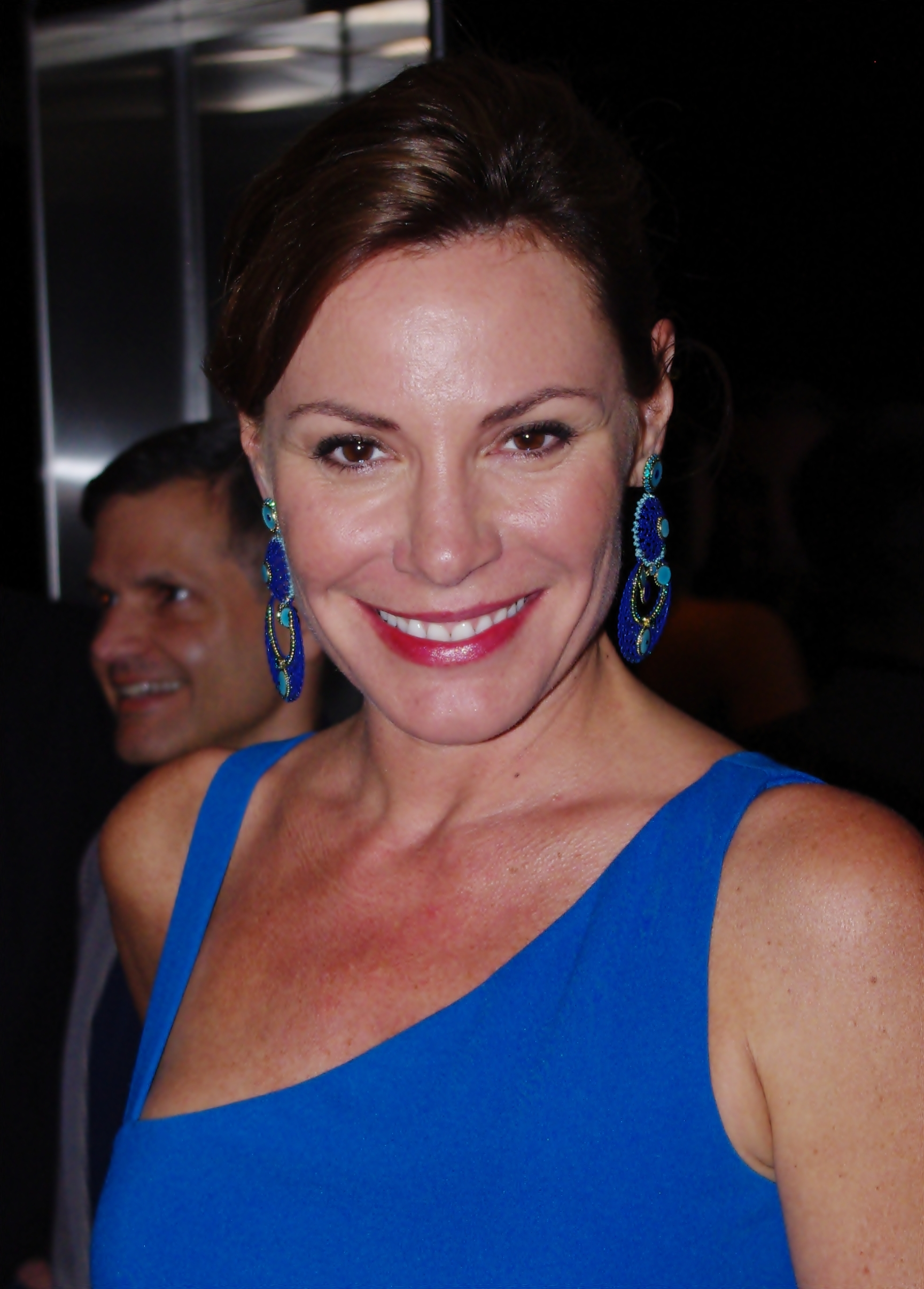
Luann de Lesseps

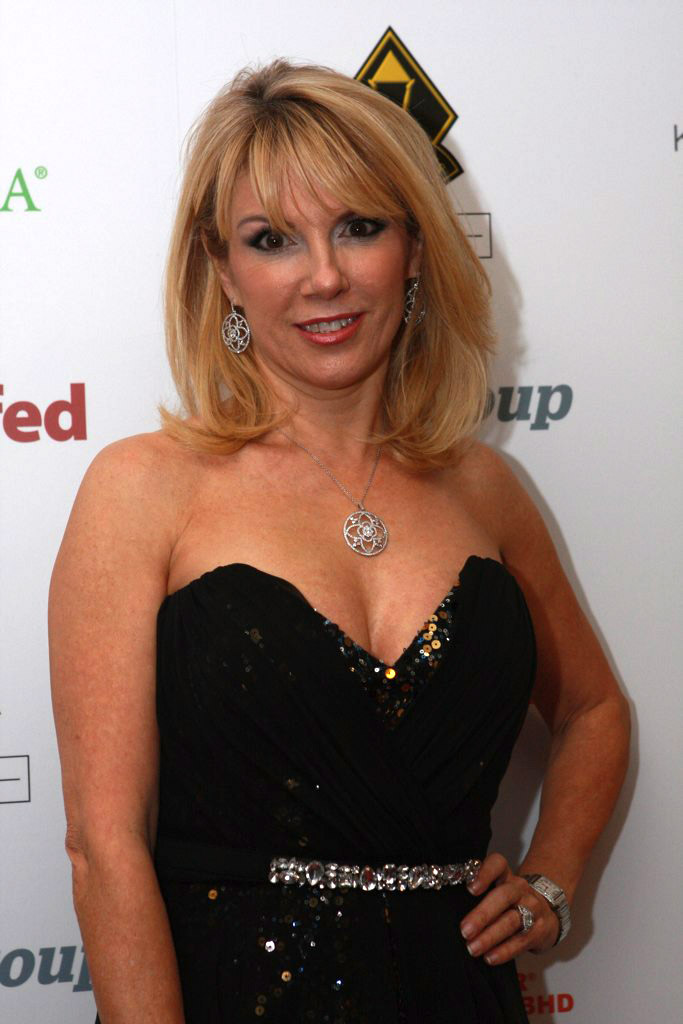
Ramona Singer

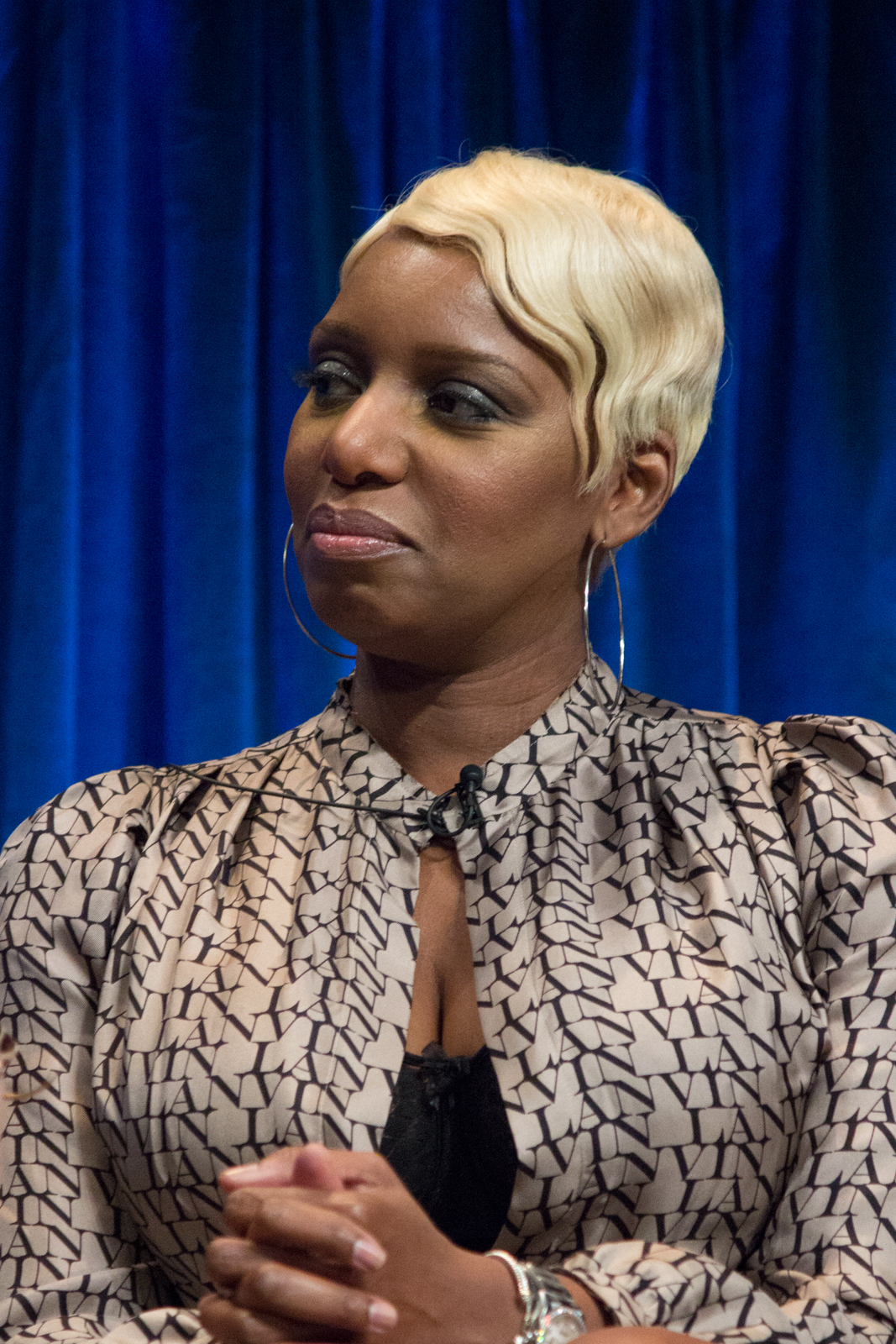
NeNe Leakes

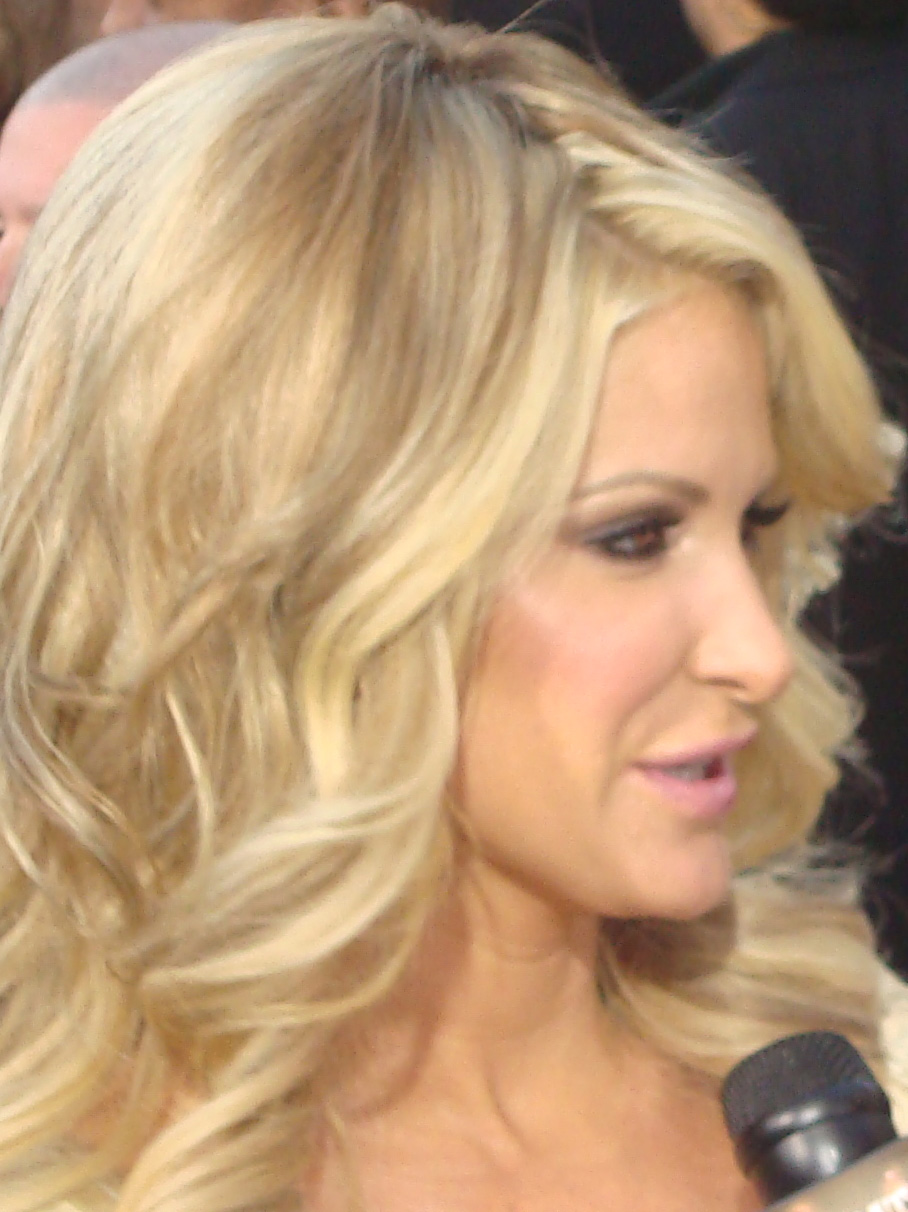
Kim Zolciak-Biermann

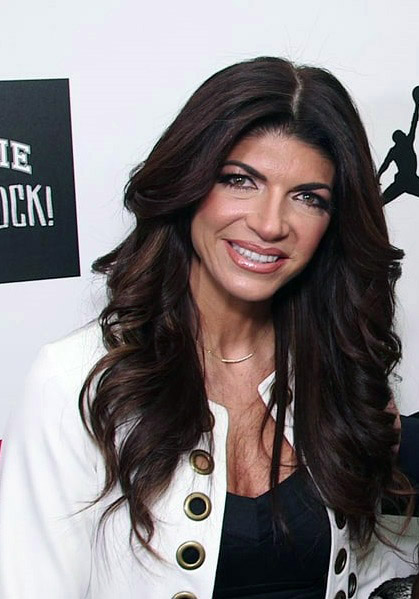
Teresa Giudice

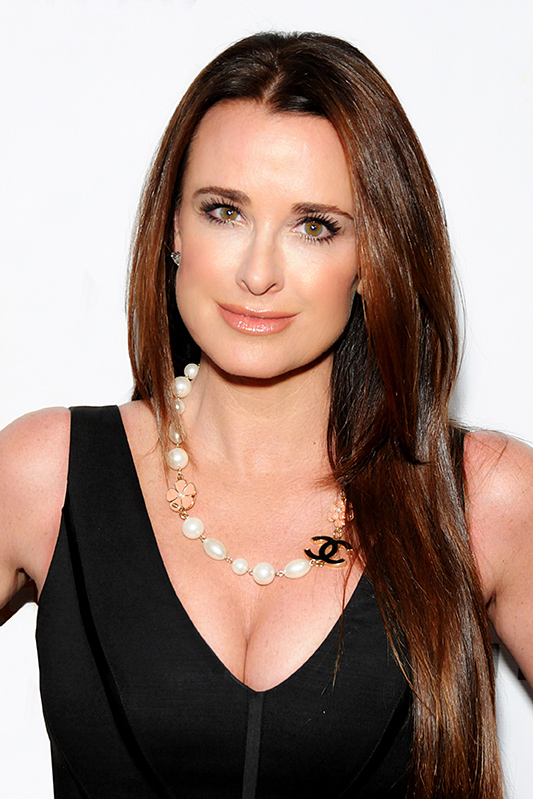
Kyle Richards

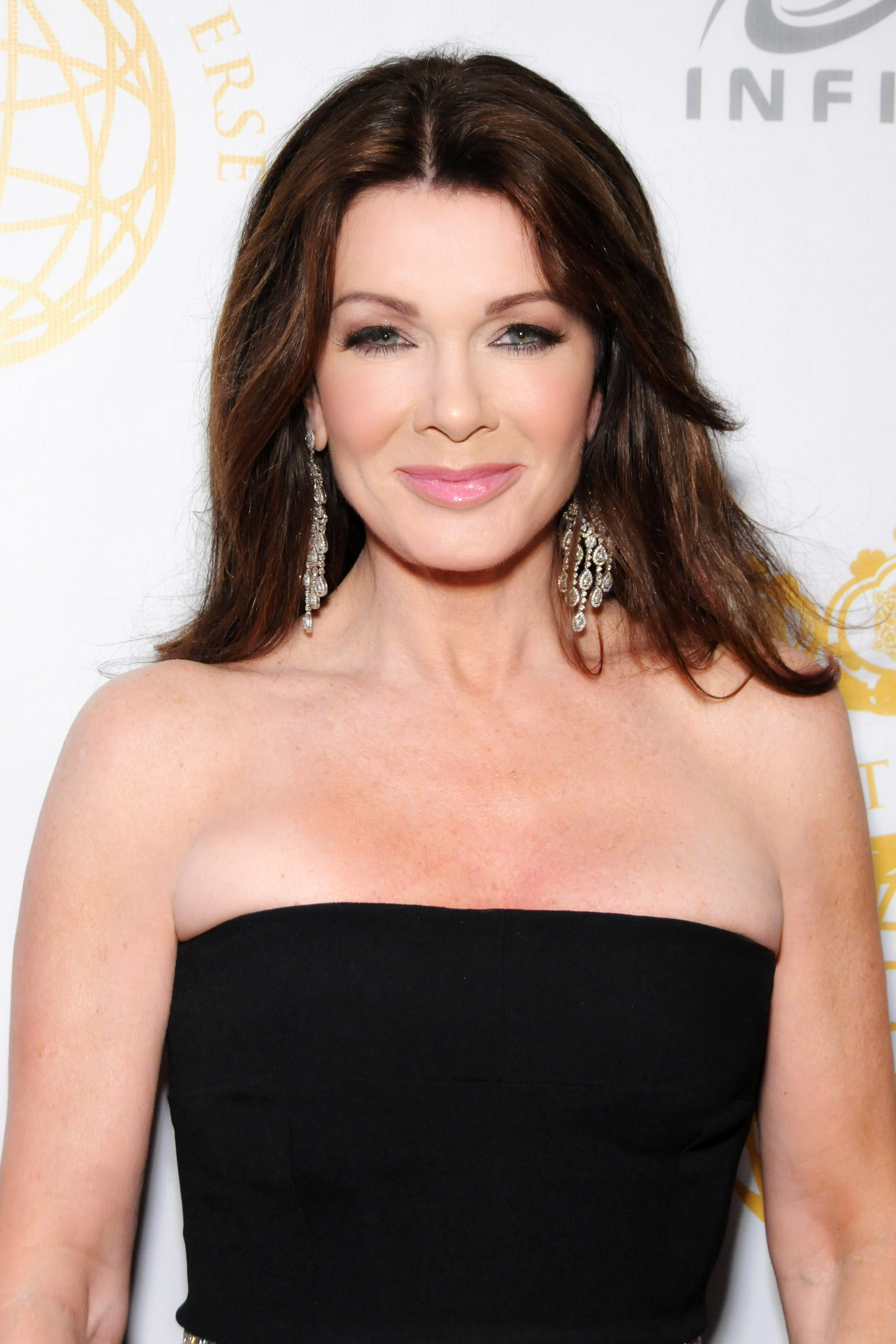
Lisa Vanderpump

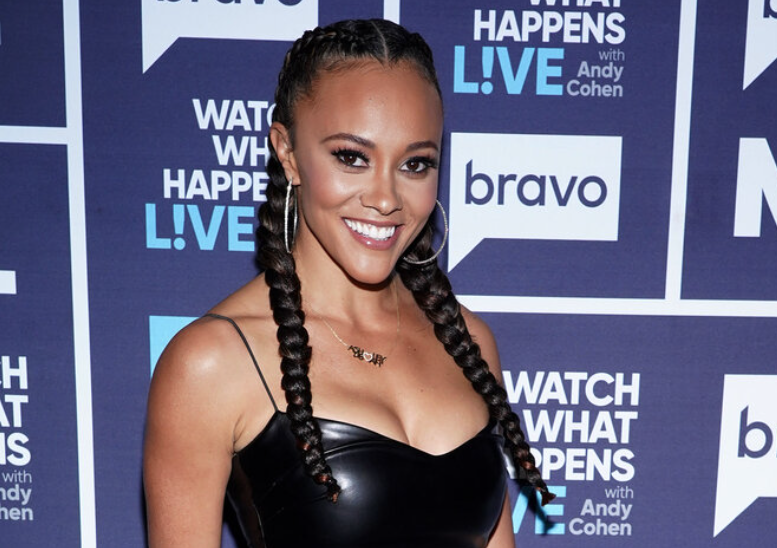
Ashley Darby

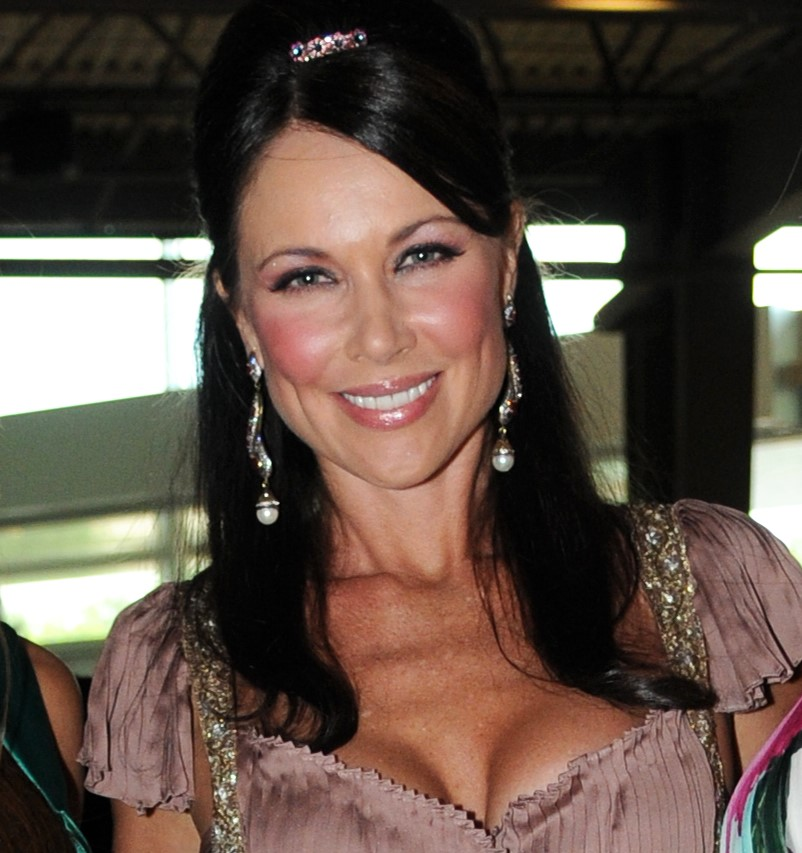
LeeAnne Locken

Various original cast members of The Real Housewives franchise

List of The Real Housewives American housewives
| Installment | Housewives | First season starred | Last season starred | Number of seasons | | | |
| Installment | Housewives | First season starred | Last season starred | Full-time | Friend | Guest | Ultimate Girls Trip |
|---|---|---|---|---|---|---|---|
| Orange County | Kimberly Bryant | 1 | 1 | 1 | 0 | 3 | 0 |
| Orange County | Jo De La Rosa | 1 | 2 | 2 | 0 | 4 | 0 |
| Orange County | Vicki Gunvalson | 1 | —N/a | 14 | 1 | 2 | 2 |
| Orange County | Jeana Keough | 1 | 5 | 5 | 1 | 7 | 0 |
| Orange County | Lauri Peterson | 1 | 4 | 4 | 1 | 1 | 0 |
| Orange County | Tammy Knickerbocker | 2 | 3 | 2 | 0 | 6 | 0 |
| Orange County | Quinn Fry | 3 | 3 | 1 | 0 | 4 | 0 |
| Orange County | Tamra Judge | 3 | —N/a | 16 | 0 | 0 | 1 |
| Orange County | Lynne Curtin | 4 | 5 | 2 | 0 | 3 | 0 |
| Orange County | Gretchen Rossi | 4 | 8 | 5 | 1 | 1 | 1 |
| Orange County | Alexis Bellino | 5 | 8 | 4 | 1 | 1 | 0 |
| Orange County | Peggy Tanous | 6 | 6 | 1 | 0 | 2 | 0 |
| Orange County | Heather Dubrow | 7 | —N/a | 10 | 0 | 0 | 0 |
| Orange County | Lydia McLaughlin | 8 | 12 | 2 | 0 | 0 | 0 |
| Orange County | Lizzie Rovsek | 9 | 9 | 1 | 1 | 4 | 0 |
| Orange County | Shannon Storms Beador | 9 | —N/a | 12 | 0 | 0 | 0 |
| Orange County | Meghan King Edmonds | 10 | 12 | 3 | 0 | 2 | 0 |
| Orange County | Kelly Dodd | 11 | 15 | 5 | 0 | 0 | 0 |
| Orange County | Peggy Sulahian | 12 | 12 | 1 | 0 | 0 | 0 |
| Orange County | Gina Kirschenheiter | 13 | —N/a | 8 | 0 | 0 | 0 |
| Orange County | Emily Simpson | 13 | —N/a | 8 | 0 | 1 | 0 |
| Orange County | Braunwyn Windham-Burke | 14 | 15 | 2 | 0 | 0 | 0 |
| Orange County | Elizabeth Lyn Vargas | 15 | 15 | 1 | 0 | 3 | 0 |
| Orange County | Jen Armstrong | 16 | 16 | 1 | 0 | 1 | 0 |
| Orange County | Noella Bergener | 16 | 16 | 1 | 0 | 2 | 0 |
| Orange County | Jennifer Pedranti | 17 | —N/a | 4 | 0 | 0 | 0 |
| Orange County | Katie Ginella | 18 | 19 | 2 | 0 | 0 | 0 |
| Orange County | Carmella Garcia | 20 | —N/a | 1 | 0 | 0 | 0 |
| New York City | Bethenny Frankel | 1 | 11 | 8 | 0 | 0 | 0 |
| New York City | Luann de Lesseps | 1 | 13 | 12 | 1 | 0 | 2 |
| New York City | Alex McCord | 1 | 4 | 4 | 0 | 0 | 1 |
| New York City | Ramona Singer | 1 | 13 | 13 | 0 | 0 | 2 |
| New York City | Jill Zarin | 1 | 4 | 4 | 0 | 4 | 1 |
| New York City | Kelly Killoren Bensimon | 2 | 4 | 3 | 0 | 2 | 1 |
| New York City | Sonja Morgan | 3 | 13 | 11 | 0 | 0 | 1 |
| New York City | Cindy Barshop | 4 | 4 | 1 | 0 | 0 | 0 |
| New York City | Aviva Drescher | 5 | 6 | 2 | 0 | 0 | 0 |
| New York City | Carole Radziwill | 5 | —N/a | 7 | 0 | 0 | 0 |
| New York City | Heather Thomson | 5 | 7 | 3 | 1 | 4 | 0 |
| New York City | Kristen Taekman | 6 | 7 | 2 | 0 | 0 | 1 |
| New York City | Dorinda Medley | 7 | 12 | 6 | 0 | 1 | 2 |
| New York City | Jules Wainstein | 8 | 8 | 1 | 0 | 0 | 0 |
| New York City | Tinsley Mortimer | 9 | 12 | 4 | 0 | 0 | 0 |
| New York City | Leah McSweeney | 12 | 13 | 2 | 0 | 0 | 1 |
| New York City | Eboni K. Williams | 13 | 13 | 1 | 0 | 0 | 0 |
| New York City | Sai De Silva | 14 | —N/a | 3 | 0 | 0 | 0 |
| New York City | Ubah Hassan | 14 | 15 | 2 | 0 | 0 | 0 |
| New York City | Erin Lichy | 14 | —N/a | 3 | 0 | 0 | 0 |
| New York City | Jenna Lyons | 14 | 15 | 2 | 0 | 0 | 0 |
| New York City | Jessel Taank | 14 | —N/a | 3 | 0 | 0 | 0 |
| New York City | Brynn Whitfield | 14 | 15 | 2 | 0 | 0 | 0 |
| New York City | Racquel Chevremont | 15 | 15 | 1 | 0 | 0 | 0 |
| New York City | Hailey Glassman | 16 | —N/a | 1 | 0 | 0 | 0 |
| New York City | Erika Hammond | 16 | —N/a | 1 | 0 | 0 | 0 |
| New York City | Daisy Toye | 16 | —N/a | 1 | 0 | 0 | 0 |
| Atlanta | NeNe Leakes | 1 | 12 | 10 | 0 | 1 | 0 |
| Atlanta | DeShawn Snow | 1 | 1 | 1 | 0 | 2 | 0 |
| Atlanta | Shereé Whitfield | 1 | 15 | 8 | 1 | 1 | 0 |
| Atlanta | Lisa Wu | 1 | 2 | 2 | 0 | 5 | 0 |
| Atlanta | Kim Zolciak-Biermann | 1 | 5 | 5 | 1 | 2 | 0 |
| Atlanta | Kandi Burruss | 2 | 15 | 14 | 0 | 0 | 0 |
| Atlanta | Cynthia Bailey | 3 | 13 | 11 | 2 | 1 | 1 |
| Atlanta | Phaedra Parks | 3 | —N/a | 9 | 0 | 0 | 2 |
| Atlanta | Kenya Moore | 5 | 15 | 10 | 0 | 2 | 1 |
| Atlanta | Porsha Williams | 5 | —N/a | 10 | 1 | 0 | 1 |
| Atlanta | Claudia Jordan | 7 | 7 | 1 | 0 | 2 | 0 |
| Atlanta | Kim Fields | 8 | 8 | 1 | 0 | 0 | 0 |
| Atlanta | Shamari DeVoe | 11 | 11 | 1 | 0 | 0 | 0 |
| Atlanta | Eva Marcille | 11 | 12 | 2 | 1 | 1 | 2 |
| Atlanta | Drew Sidora | 13 | —N/a | 5 | 0 | 0 | 0 |
| Atlanta | Marlo Hampton | 14 | 15 | 2 | 5 | 3 | 0 |
| Atlanta | Sanya Richards-Ross | 14 | 15 | 2 | 0 | 0 | 0 |
| Atlanta | Brit Eady | 16 | 16 | 1 | 0 | 0 | 0 |
| Atlanta | Kelli Potter | 16 | —N/a | 2 | 0 | 0 | 0 |
| Atlanta | Shamea Morton Mwangi | 16 | —N/a | 2 | 1 | 9 | 0 |
| Atlanta | Angela Oakley | 16 | —N/a | 2 | 0 | 0 | 0 |
| Atlanta | Pinky Cole | 17 | —N/a | 1 | 0 | 0 | 0 |
| Atlanta | K. Michelle | 17 | —N/a | 1 | 0 | 0 | 0 |
| New Jersey | Teresa Giudice | 1 | —N/a | 15 | 0 | 0 | 1 |
| New Jersey | Jacqueline Laurita | 1 | 7 | 6 | 0 | 1 | 0 |
| New Jersey | Caroline Manzo | 1 | 5 | 5 | 0 | 0 | 1 |
| New Jersey | Dina Manzo | 1 | 6 | 3 | 0 | 1 | 0 |
| New Jersey | Danielle Staub | 1 | 2 | 2 | 3 | 0 | 0 |
| New Jersey | Melissa Gorga | 3 | —N/a | 13 | 0 | 1 | 1 |
| New Jersey | Kathy Wakile | 3 | 5 | 3 | 2 | 1 | 0 |
| New Jersey | Teresa Aprea | 6 | 6 | 1 | 0 | 1 | 0 |
| New Jersey | Amber Marchese | 6 | 6 | 1 | 0 | 0 | 0 |
| New Jersey | Nicole Napolitano | 6 | 6 | 1 | 0 | 1 | 0 |
| New Jersey | Dolores Catania | 7 | —N/a | 9 | 0 | 3 | 0 |
| New Jersey | Siggy Flicker | 7 | 8 | 2 | 0 | 0 | 0 |
| New Jersey | Margaret Josephs | 8 | 14 | 7 | 0 | 0 | 0 |
| New Jersey | Jennifer Aydin | 9 | 14 | 6 | 0 | 1 | 0 |
| New Jersey | Jackie Goldschneider | 9 | 12 | 4 | 2 | 0 | 0 |
| New Jersey | Danielle Cabral | 13 | 14 | 2 | 0 | 0 | 0 |
| New Jersey | Rachel Fuda | 13 | 14 | 2 | 0 | 0 | 0 |
| New Jersey | Malvina Blloshmi | 15 | —N/a | 1 | 0 | 0 | 0 |
| New Jersey | Xio Cammarota | 15 | —N/a | 1 | 0 | 0 | 0 |
| New Jersey | Juliette Collazo | 15 | —N/a | 1 | 0 | 0 | 0 |
| New Jersey | Deeba Patel | 15 | —N/a | 1 | 0 | 0 | 0 |
| New Jersey | Natia Rufolo | 15 | —N/a | 1 | 0 | 0 | 0 |
| D.C. | Mary Amons | 1 | 1 | 1 | 0 | 0 | 0 |
| D.C. | Lynda Erkiletian | 1 | 1 | 1 | 0 | 0 | 0 |
| D.C. | Cat Ommanney | 1 | 1 | 1 | 0 | 0 | 0 |
| D.C. | Michaele Salahi | 1 | 1 | 1 | 0 | 0 | 0 |
| D.C. | Stacie Scott Turner | 1 | 1 | 1 | 0 | 0 | 0 |
| Beverly Hills | Taylor Armstrong | 1 | 3 | 3 | 0 | 3 | 1 |
| Beverly Hills | Camille Grammer | 1 | 2 | 2 | 3 | 6 | 1 |
| Beverly Hills | Adrienne Maloof | 1 | 3 | 3 | 0 | 4 | 0 |
| Beverly Hills | Kim Richards | 1 | 5 | 5 | 0 | 5 | 0 |
| Beverly Hills | Kyle Richards | 1 | —N/a | 16 | 0 | 0 | 1 |
| Beverly Hills | Lisa Vanderpump | 1 | 9 | 9 | 0 | 0 | 0 |
| Beverly Hills | Brandi Glanville | 3 | 5 | 3 | 1 | 3 | 2 |
| Beverly Hills | Yolanda Hadid | 3 | 6 | 4 | 0 | 0 | 0 |
| Beverly Hills | Carlton Gebbia | 4 | 4 | 1 | 0 | 0 | 0 |
| Beverly Hills | Joyce Giraud de Ohoven | 4 | 4 | 1 | 0 | 0 | 0 |
| Beverly Hills | Eileen Davidson | 5 | 7 | 3 | 0 | 2 | 0 |
| Beverly Hills | Lisa Rinna | 5 | 12 | 8 | 0 | 1 | 0 |
| Beverly Hills | Kathryn Edwards | 6 | 6 | 1 | 0 | 0 | 0 |
| Beverly Hills | Erika Jayne | 6 | —N/a | 11 | 0 | 0 | 0 |
| Beverly Hills | Dorit Kemsley | 7 | —N/a | 10 | 0 | 0 | 0 |
| Beverly Hills | Teddi Mellencamp Arroyave | 8 | 10 | 3 | 0 | 3 | 0 |
| Beverly Hills | Denise Richards | 9 | 10 | 2 | 0 | 3 | 0 |
| Beverly Hills | Garcelle Beauvais | 10 | 14 | 5 | 0 | 0 | 0 |
| Beverly Hills | Crystal Kung Minkoff | 11 | 13 | 3 | 0 | 0 | 0 |
| Beverly Hills | Sutton Stracke | 11 | —N/a | 6 | 1 | 0 | 0 |
| Beverly Hills | Diana Jenkins | 12 | 12 | 1 | 0 | 0 | 0 |
| Beverly Hills | Annemarie Wiley | 13 | 13 | 1 | 0 | 0 | 0 |
| Beverly Hills | Bozoma Saint John | 14 | —N/a | 3 | 0 | 0 | 0 |
| Beverly Hills | Amanda Frances | 15 | 15 | 1 | 0 | 0 | 0 |
| Beverly Hills | Rachel Zoe | 15 | —N/a | 2 | 0 | 0 | 0 |
| Beverly Hills | Tracy Tutor | 16 | —N/a | 1 | 0 | 0 | 0 |
| Beverly Hills | Leah Remini | 16 | —N/a | 1 | 0 | 0 | 0 |
| Miami | Lea Black | 1 | 3 | 3 | 0 | 1 | 0 |
| Miami | Adriana de Moura | 1 | 3 | 3 | 4 | 0 | 0 |
| Miami | Alexia Nepola | 1 | 7 | 6 | 1 | 0 | 1 |
| Miami | Marysol Patton | 1 | 2 | 2 | 5 | 0 | 1 |
| Miami | Larsa Pippen | 1 | 7 | 5 | 0 | 0 | 0 |
| Miami | Cristy Rice | 1 | 1 | 1 | 0 | 0 | 0 |
| Miami | Lisa Hochstein | 2 | 7 | 6 | 0 | 0 | 0 |
| Miami | Joanna Krupa | 2 | 3 | 2 | 0 | 0 | 0 |
| Miami | Ana Quincoces | 2 | 2 | 1 | 1 | 2 | 0 |
| Miami | Karent Sierra | 2 | 2 | 1 | 0 | 1 | 0 |
| Miami | Guerdy Abraira | 4 | 7 | 4 | 0 | 0 | 0 |
| Miami | Julia Lemigova | 4 | 7 | 4 | 0 | 0 | 0 |
| Miami | Nicole Martin | 4 | 6 | 3 | 0 | 1 | 0 |
| Miami | Stephanie Shojaee | 7 | 7 | 1 | 0 | 0 | 0 |
| Potomac | Gizelle Bryant | 1 | —N/a | 11 | 0 | 0 | 1 |
| Potomac | Ashley Darby | 1 | —N/a | 11 | 0 | 0 | 0 |
| Potomac | Robyn Dixon | 1 | 8 | 8 | 1 | 0 | 0 |
| Potomac | Karen Huger | 1 | —N/a | 10 | 0 | 1 | 0 |
| Potomac | Charrisse Jackson-Jordan | 1 | 2 | 2 | 3 | 1 | 0 |
| Potomac | Katie Rost | 1 | 1 | 1 | 1 | 2 | 0 |
| Potomac | Monique Samuels | 2 | 5 | 4 | 2 | 0 | 0 |
| Potomac | Candiace Dillard Bassett | 3 | 8 | 6 | 0 | 0 | 1 |
| Potomac | Wendy Osefo | 5 | —N/a | 7 | 0 | 0 | 0 |
| Potomac | Mia Thornton | 6 | 9 | 4 | 0 | 0 | 0 |
| Potomac | Nneka Ihim | 8 | 8 | 1 | 0 | 0 | 0 |
| Potomac | Keiarna Stewart | 9 | 10 | 2 | 1 | 1 | 0 |
| Potomac | Stacey Rusch | 9 | —N/a | 3 | 0 | 0 | 0 |
| Potomac | Tia Glover | 10 | —N/a | 2 | 0 | 0 | 0 |
| Potomac | Angel Massie | 10 | 10 | 1 | 0 | 0 | 0 |
| Potomac | Courtney Ajinça | 11 | —N/a | 1 | 0 | 0 | 0 |
| Dallas | Cary Deuber | 1 | 3 | 3 | 1 | 0 | 0 |
| Dallas | Tiffany Hendra | 1 | 1 | 1 | 0 | 2 | 0 |
| Dallas | Stephanie Hollman | 1 | 5 | 5 | 0 | 0 | 0 |
| Dallas | LeeAnne Locken | 1 | 4 | 4 | 0 | 0 | 0 |
| Dallas | Brandi Redmond | 1 | 5 | 5 | 0 | 0 | 0 |
| Dallas | D'Andra Simmons | 2 | 5 | 4 | 0 | 0 | 0 |
| Dallas | Kameron Westcott | 2 | 5 | 4 | 0 | 0 | 0 |
| Dallas | Kary Brittingham | 4 | 5 | 2 | 0 | 0 | 0 |
| Dallas | Tiffany Moon | 5 | 5 | 1 | 0 | 1 | 0 |
| Salt Lake City | Lisa Barlow | 1 | —N/a | 7 | 0 | 0 | 0 |
| Salt Lake City | Mary Cosby | 1 | —N/a | 5 | 1 | 0 | 0 |
| Salt Lake City | Heather Gay | 1 | —N/a | 7 | 0 | 0 | 1 |
| Salt Lake City | Meredith Marks | 1 | —N/a | 7 | 0 | 0 | 0 |
| Salt Lake City | Whitney Rose | 1 | —N/a | 7 | 0 | 0 | 1 |
| Salt Lake City | Jen Shah | 1 | 3 | 3 | 0 | 0 | 0 |
| Salt Lake City | Jennie Nguyen | 2 | 2 | 1 | 0 | 0 | 0 |
| Salt Lake City | Angie Katsanevas | 4 | —N/a | 4 | 1 | 1 | 0 |
| Salt Lake City | Monica Garcia | 4 | 4 | 1 | 0 | 0 | 0 |
| Salt Lake City | Bronwyn Newport | 5 | —N/a | 3 | 0 | 0 | 0 |
| Dubaï | Nina Ali | 1 | 1 | 1 | 0 | 1 | 0 |
| Dubaï | Chanel Ayan | 1 | 2 | 2 | 0 | 0 | 0 |
| Dubaï | Sara Al Madani | 1 | 2 | 2 | 0 | 0 | 0 |
| Dubaï | Caroline Brooks | 1 | 2 | 2 | 0 | 0 | 0 |
| Dubaï | Lesa Milan | 1 | 2 | 2 | 0 | 0 | 0 |
| Dubaï | Caroline Stanbury | 1 | 2 | 2 | 0 | 0 | 0 |
| Dubaï | Taleen Marie | 2 | 2 | 1 | 0 | 1 | 0 |
| Rhode Island | Alicia Carmody | 1 | —N/a | 1 | 0 | 0 | 0 |
| Rhode Island | Rosie DiMare | 1 | —N/a | 1 | 0 | 0 | 0 |
| Rhode Island | Ashley Iaconetti | 1 | —N/a | 1 | 0 | 0 | 0 |
| Rhode Island | Liz McGraw | 1 | 1 | 1 | 0 | 0 | 0 |
| Rhode Island | Rulla Nehme Pontarelli | 1 | —N/a | 1 | 0 | 0 | 0 |
| Rhode Island | Kelsey Swanson | 1 | —N/a | 1 | 0 | 0 | 0 |
| Rhode Island | Jo-Ellen Tiberi | 1 | —N/a | 1 | 0 | 0 | 0 |

Several installments have featured cast members in a recurring capacity, referred to as "friends of the housewives." The first recurring cast member in the franchise was Jennifer Gilbert, introduced during the third season of The Real Housewives of New York City. Some cast members only ever appear on the series as friends; occasionally, friends are promoted to full-time cast members, and full-time cast members are reduced to friends.

Housewives who have been featured as friends either before or after being a full-time cast member include Vicki Gunvalson, Jeana Keough, Lauri Peterson, Gretchen Rossi, Alexis Bellino and Lizzie Rovsek from Orange County; Luann de Lesseps and Heather Thomson from New York City; Cynthia Bailey, Marlo Hampton, Eva Marcille, Shamea Morton Mwangi, Shereé Whitfield, Porsha Williams and Kim Zolciak-Biermann from Atlanta; Jacqueline Laurita, Danielle Staub, Kathy Wakile and Jackie Goldschneider from New Jersey; Brandi Glanville, Camille Grammer and Sutton Stracke from Beverly Hills; Adriana de Moura, Alexia Nepola, Marysol Patton and Ana Quincoces from Miami; Robyn Dixon, Charrisse Jackson-Jordan, Katie Rost, Monique Samuels and Keiarna Stewart from Potomac; Cary Deuber from Dallas; and Mary Cosby and Angie Katsanevas from Salt Lake City. Other women who have appeared in a recurring capacity across the franchise are listed below.

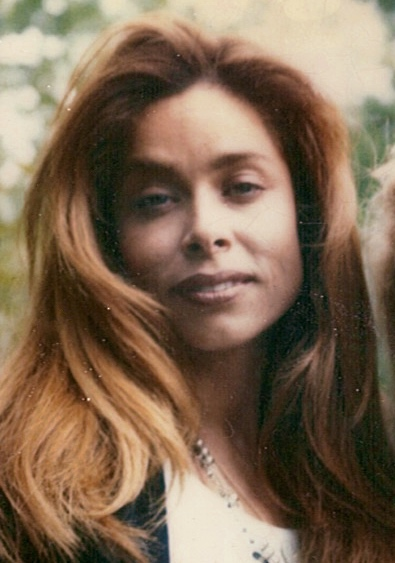
Faye Resnick

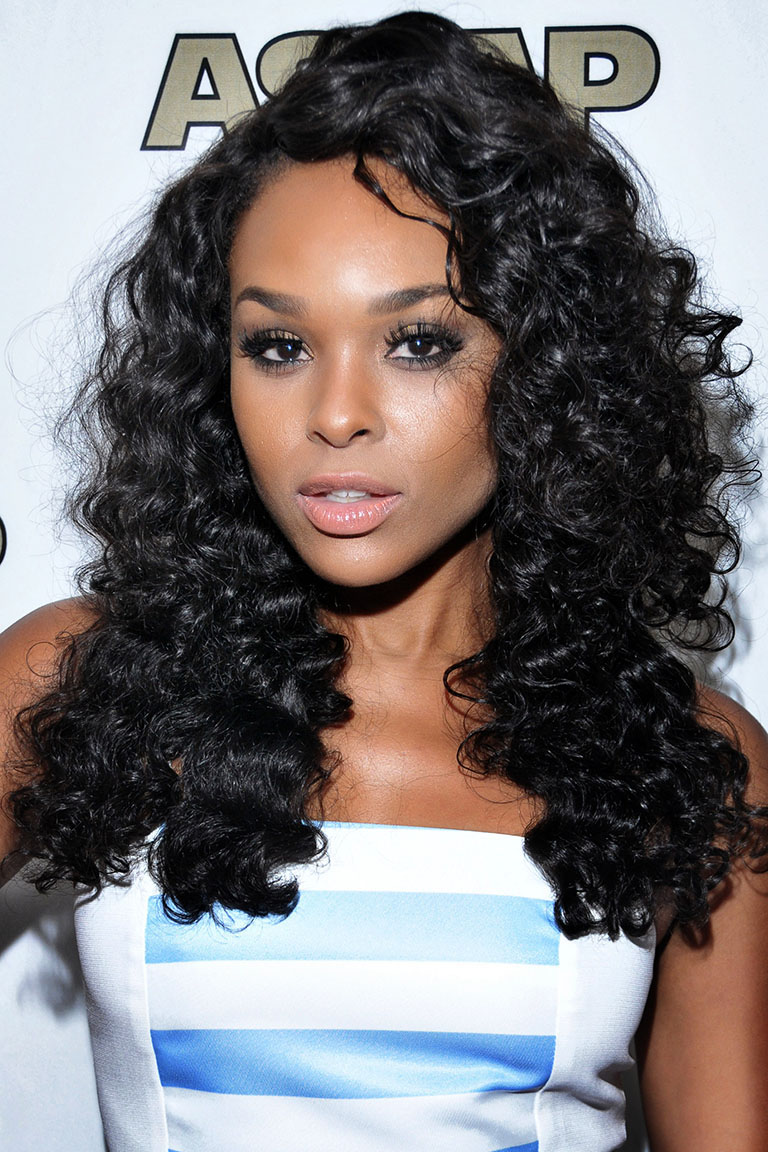
Demetria McKinney

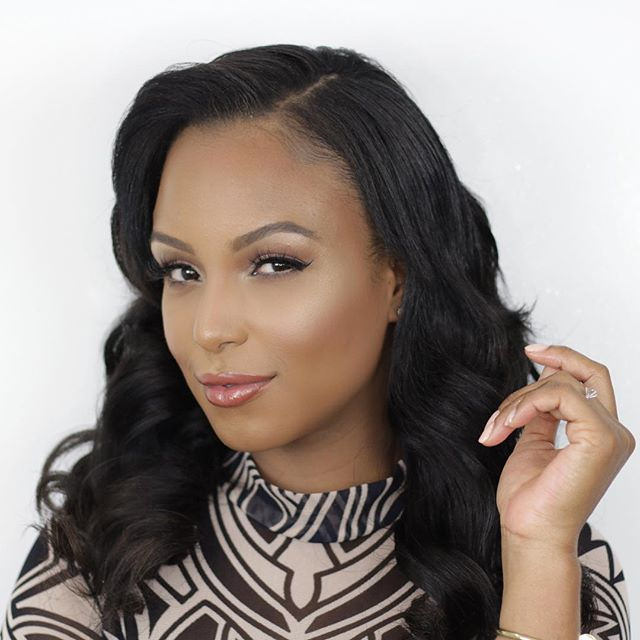
LaToya Ali

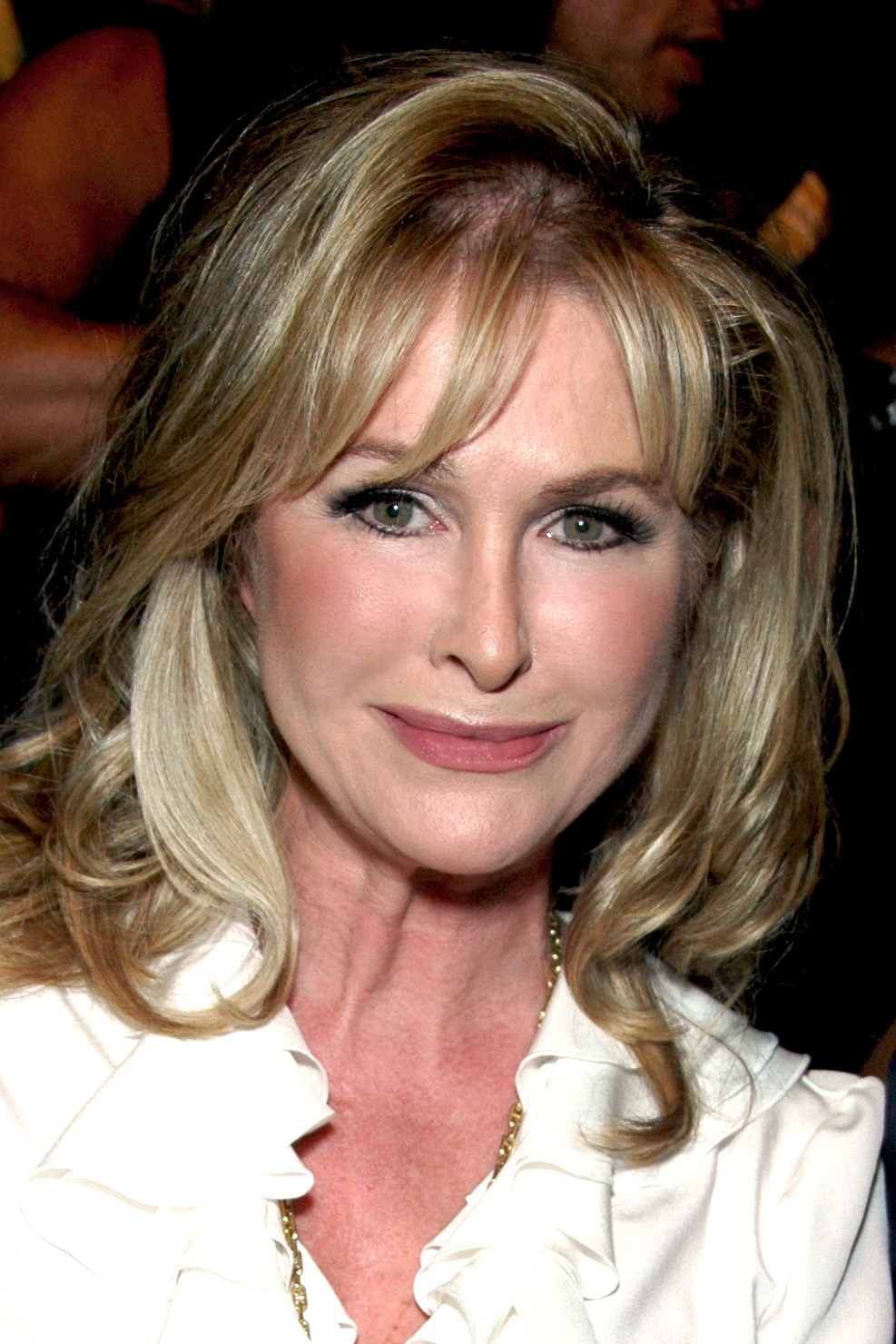
Kathy Hilton

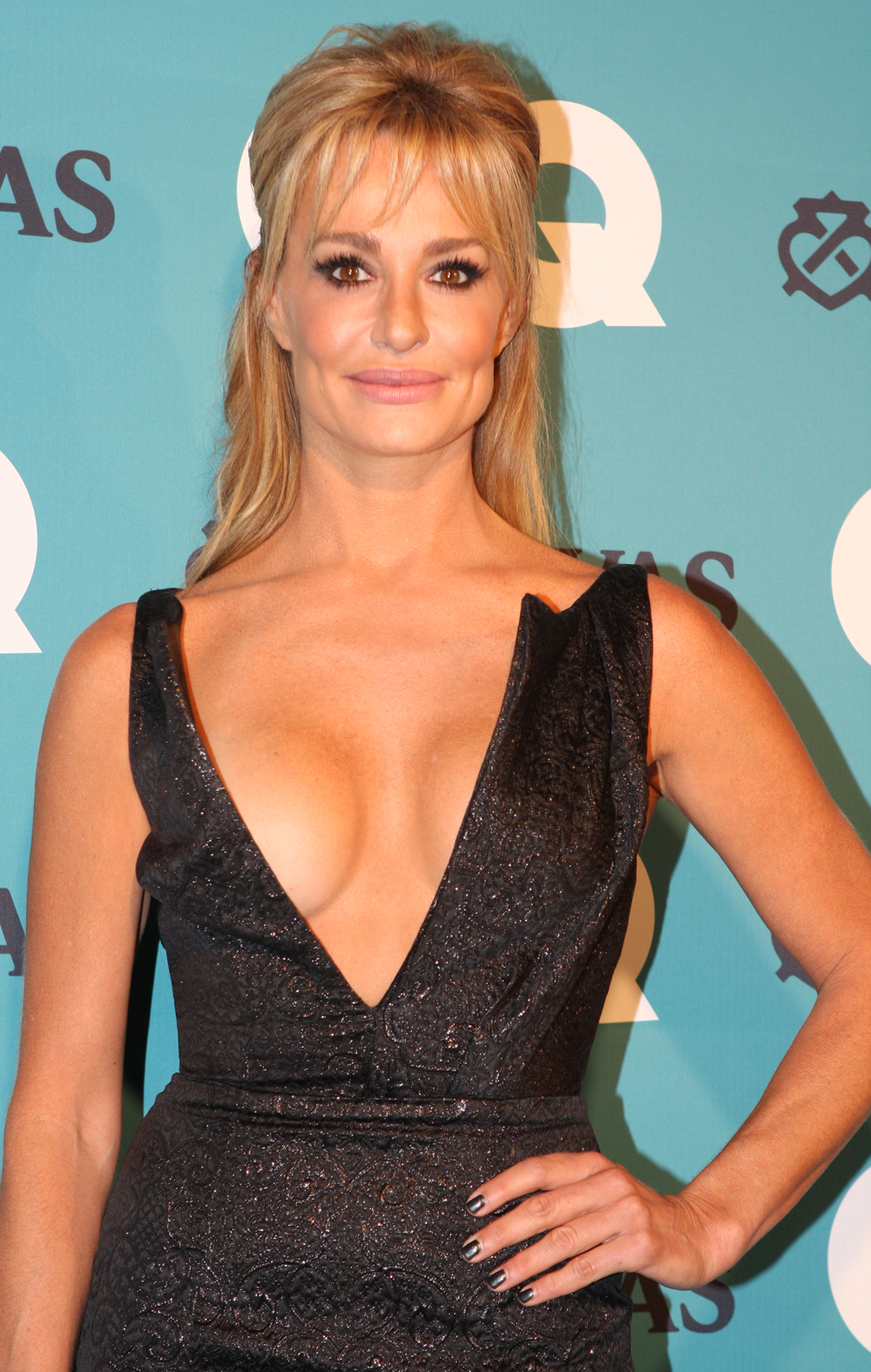
Taylor Armstrong

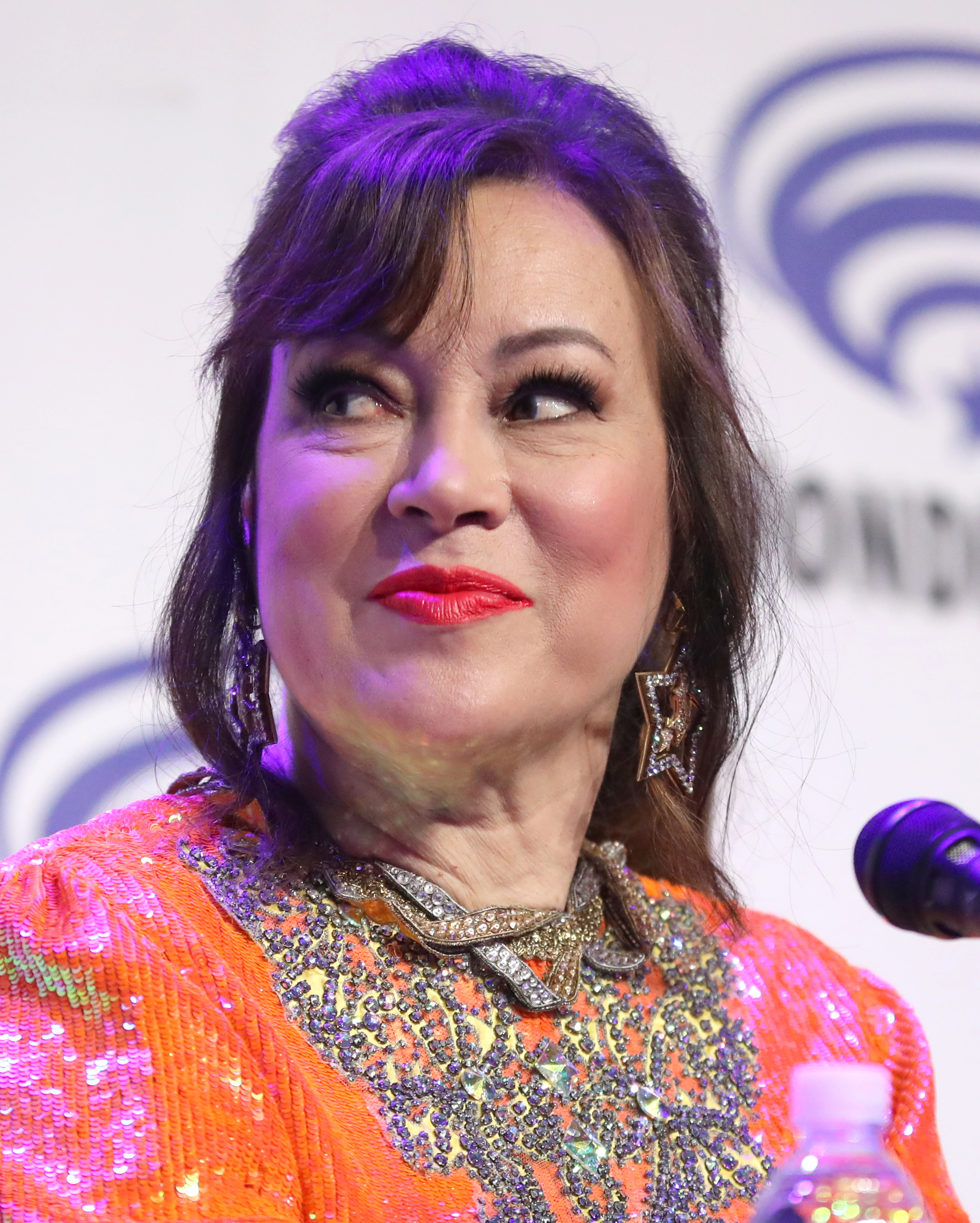
Jennifer Tilly

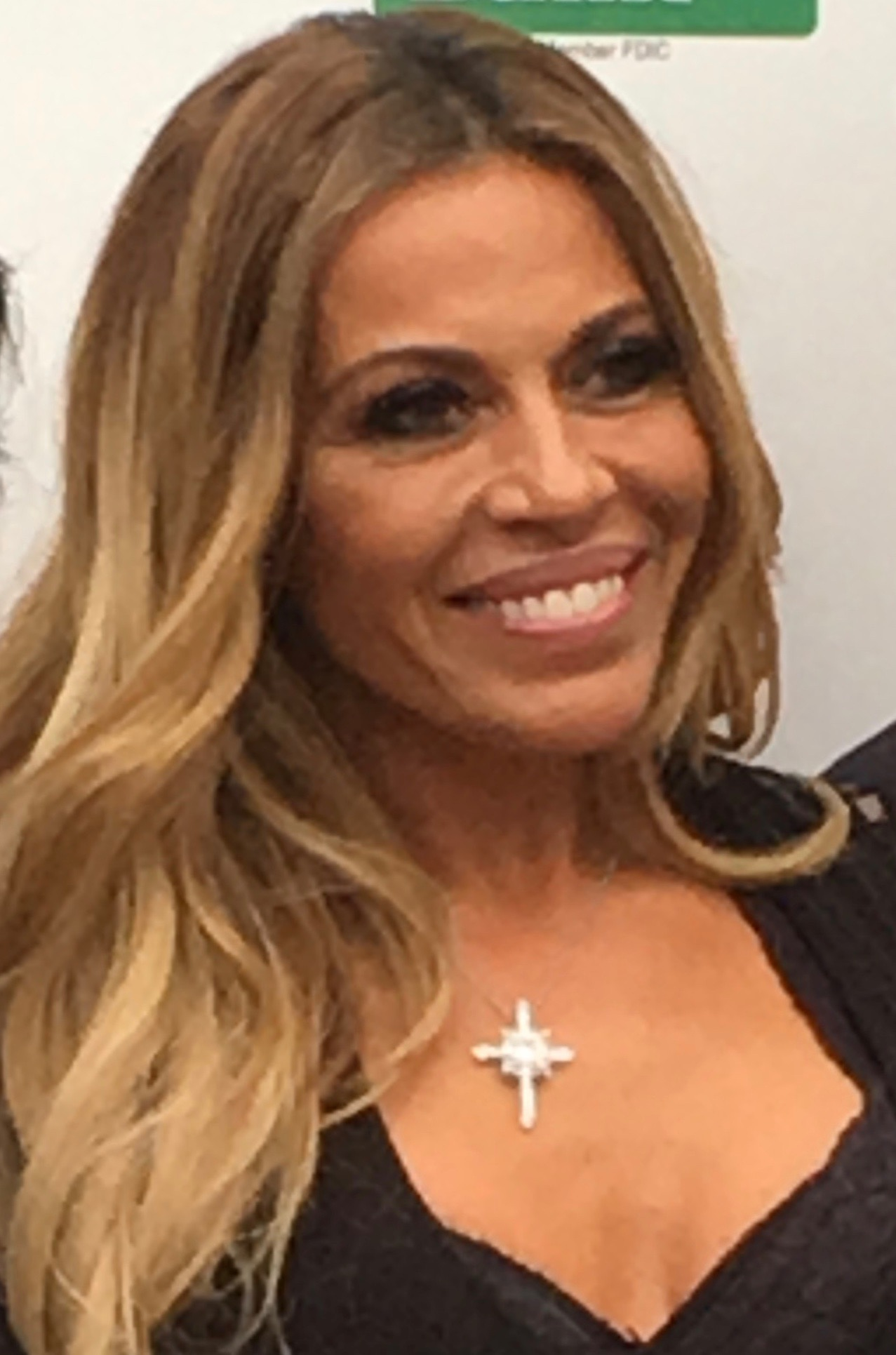
Dolores Catania

Various friends of the housewives

List of The Real Housewives American housewives' friends
| Installment | Friends | First season appeared | Last season appeared | Number of seasons | |
| Installment | Friends | First season appeared | Last season appeared | Friend | Guest |
|---|---|---|---|---|---|
| Orange County | Fernanda Rocha | 6 | 6 | 1 | 2 |
| Orange County | Sarah Winchester | 7 | 7 | 1 | 2 |
| Orange County | Danielle Gregorio | 9 | 9 | 1 | 0 |
| Orange County | Nicole James | 16 | 16 | 1 | 0 |
| Orange County | Taylor Armstrong | 17 | 17 | 1 | 0 |
| New York City | Jennifer Gilbert | 3 | 3 | 1 | 1 |
| New York City | Barbara Kavovit | 11 | 11 | 1 | 6 |
| New York City | Elyse Slaine | 12 | 12 | 1 | 2 |
| New York City | Bershan Shaw | 13 | 13 | 1 | 0 |
| New York City | Rebecca Minkoff | 15 | 15 | 1 | 0 |
| New York City | Devyn Simone | 16 | —N/a | 1 | 1 |
| Atlanta | Demetria McKinney | 7 | 7 | 1 | 1 |
| Atlanta | Tanya Sam | 11 | 13 | 3 | 0 |
| Atlanta | LaToya Ali | 13 | 13 | 1 | 1 |
| Atlanta | Monyetta Shaw-Carter | 14 | 15 | 2 | 0 |
| Atlanta | Courtney Rhodes | 15 | 15 | 1 | 0 |
| New Jersey | Kim Granatell | 2 | 2 | 1 | 1 |
| New Jersey | Kim DePaola | 4 | 5 | 2 | 4 |
| New Jersey | Jennifer Dalton | 5 | 5 | 1 | 0 |
| New Jersey | Rosie Pierri | 7 | 7 | 1 | 4 |
| New Jersey | Traci Johnson | 12 | 12 | 1 | 1 |
| New Jersey | Jennifer Fessler | 13 | 14 | 2 | 1 |
| New Jersey | Vanessa Barrera | 15 | —N/a | 1 | 0 |
| Beverly Hills | Dana Wilkey | 2 | 2 | 1 | 2 |
| Beverly Hills | Faye Resnick | 3 | 3 | 1 | 9 |
| Beverly Hills | Marisa Zanuck | 3 | 3 | 1 | 0 |
| Beverly Hills | Eden Sassoon | 7 | 7 | 1 | 0 |
| Beverly Hills | Kathy Hilton | 11 | —N/a | 4 | 7 |
| Beverly Hills | Sheree Zampino | 12 | 12 | 1 | 3 |
| Beverly Hills | Jennifer Tilly | 14 | —N/a | 2 | 3 |
| Beverly Hills | Natalie Swanston-Fuller | 15 | 15 | 1 | 0 |
| Miami | Kiki Barth | 4 | 7 | 4 | 0 |
| Potomac | Askale Davis | 6 | 6 | 1 | 1 |
| Potomac | Jacqueline Blake | 7 | 9 | 2 | 1 |
| Potomac | Jassi Rideaux | 9 | 10 | 2 | 0 |
| Dallas | Marie Reyes | 1 | 1 | 1 | 0 |
| Dallas | Jen Davis Long | 5 | 5 | 1 | 0 |
| Salt Lake City | Angie Harrington | 3 | 3 | 1 | 2 |
| Salt Lake City | Danna Bui-Negrete | 3 | 3 | 1 | 1 |
| Salt Lake City | Britani Bateman | 5 | —N/a | 3 | 0 |
| Salt Lake City | Meili Workman | 5 | 5 | 1 | 0 |
| Salt Lake City | Ashley Quai | 7 | —N/a | 1 | 0 |
| Dubaï | Saba Yussouf | 2 | 2 | 1 | 0 |
| Rhode Island | Dolores Catania | 1 | 1 | 1 | 0 |

== International installments ==
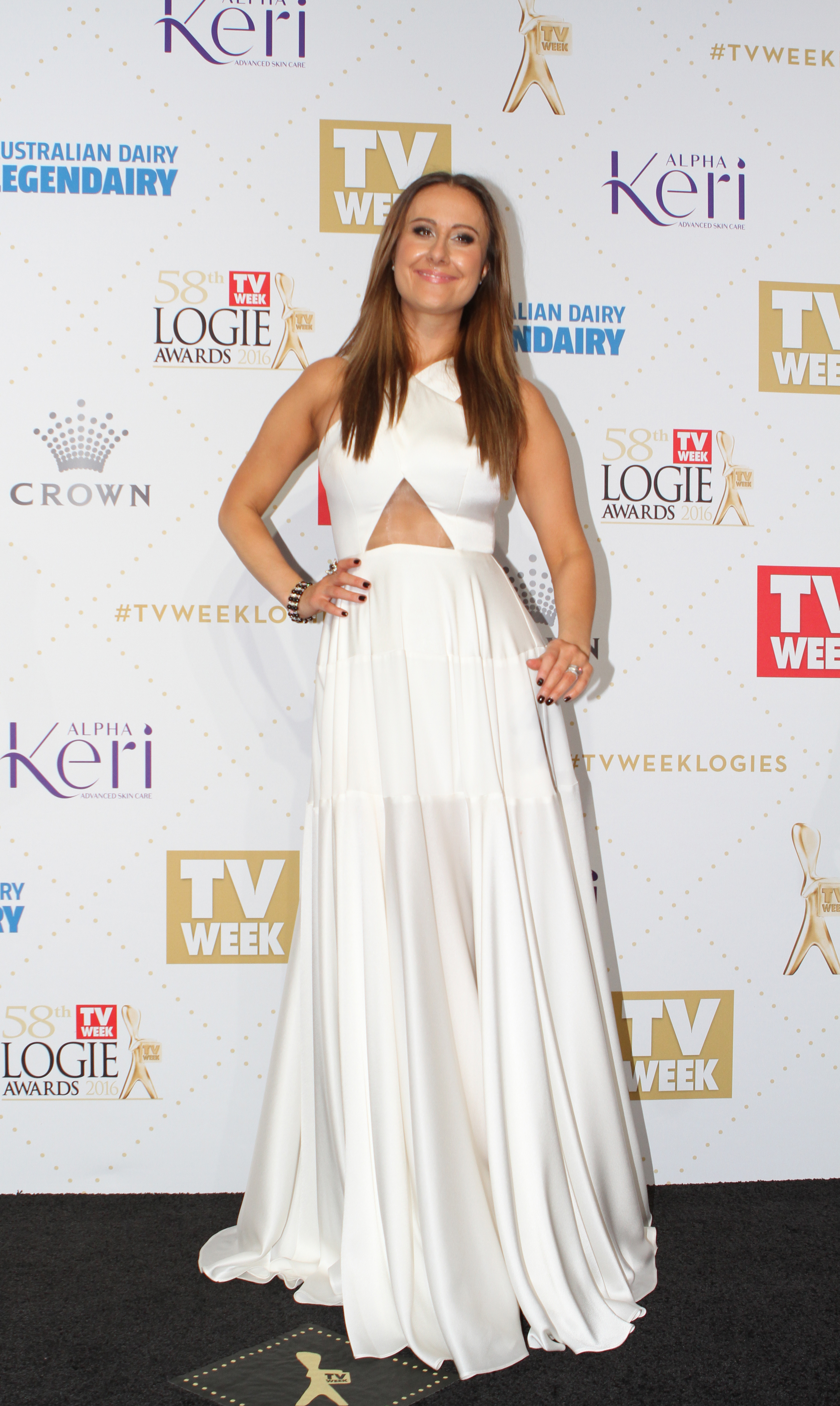
Jackie Gillies

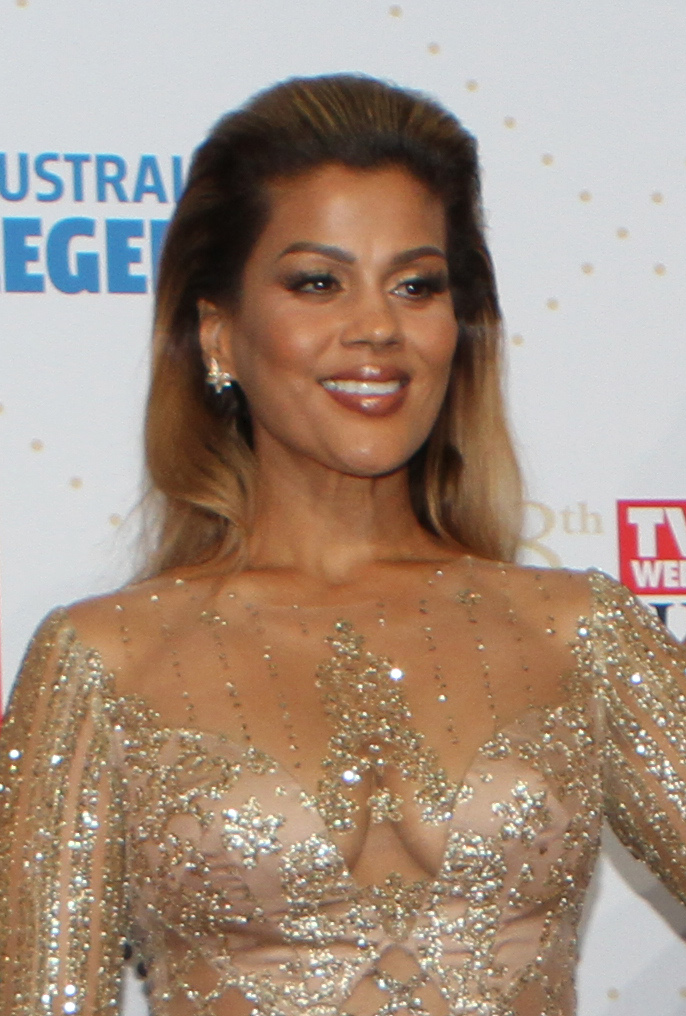
Pettifleur Berenger

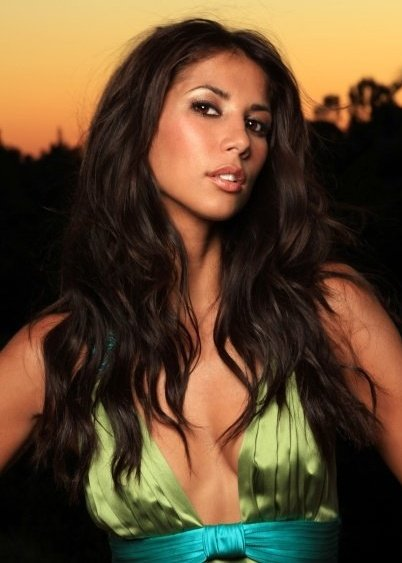
Leilani Dowding

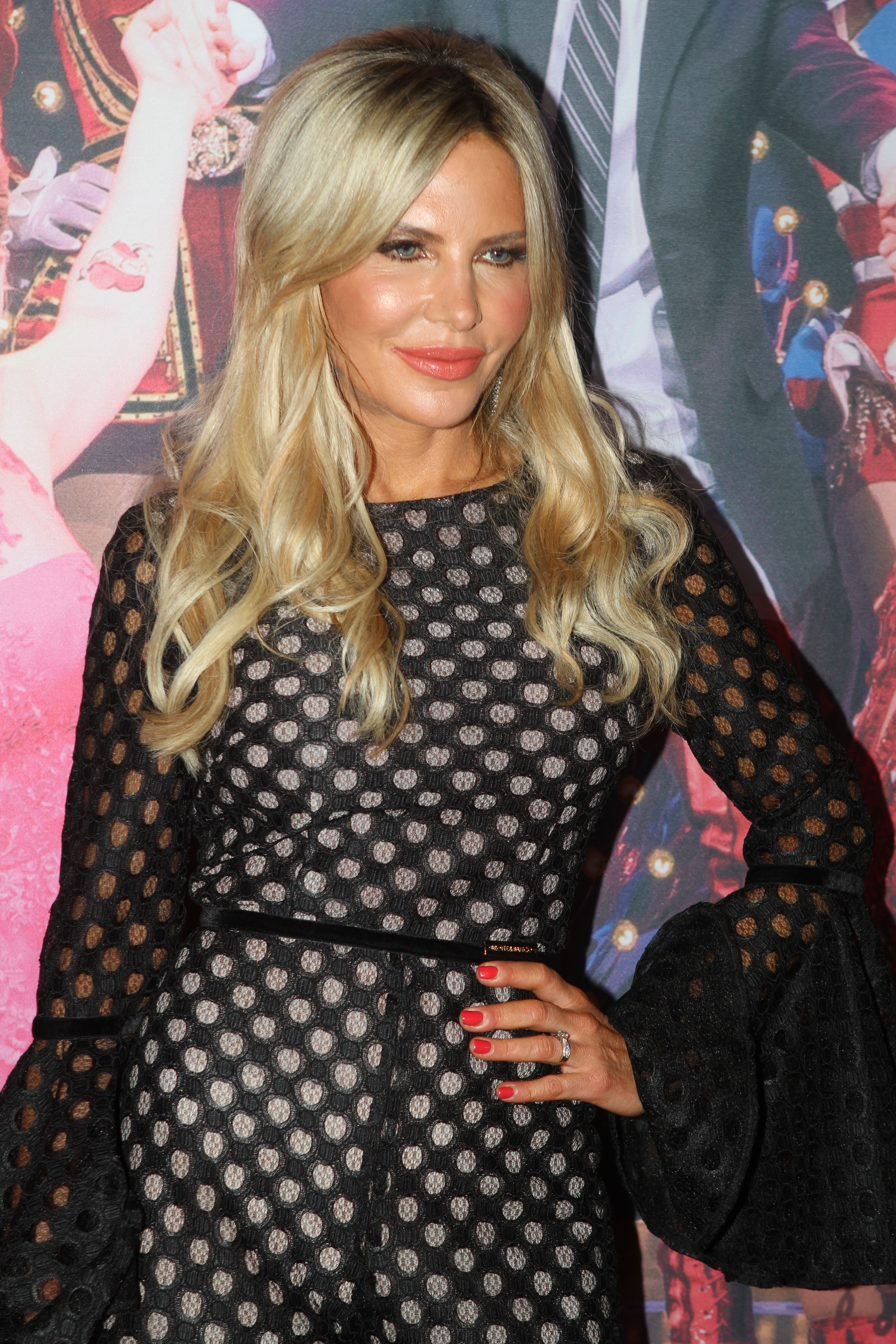
Melissa Tkautz

Various international cast members of The Real Housewives franchise

The Real Housewives international housewives
| Installment | Housewives | First season starred | Last season starred | Number of seasons | | |
| Installment | Housewives | First season starred | Last season starred | Full-time | Friend | Guest |
|---|---|---|---|---|---|---|
| Athens | Annita Nathanail | 1 | 1 | 1 | 0 | 0 |
| Athens | Fofi Mastrokosta | 1 | 1 | 1 | 0 | 0 |
| Athens | Christina Papa | 1 | 1 | 1 | 0 | 0 |
| Athens | Orthoula Papadakou | 1 | 1 | 1 | 0 | 0 |
| Athens | Ioanna Soulioti | 1 | 1 | 1 | 0 | 0 |
| Athens | Joe Satratzemi Togou | 1 | 1 | 1 | 0 | 0 |
| Me'usharot (Israel) | Nicol Raidman | 1 | 2 | 2 | 0 | 0 |
| Me'usharot (Israel) | Lea Shnirer | 1 | 2 | 2 | 0 | 1 |
| Me'usharot (Israel) | Tali Sinai Riklis | 1 | 1 | 1 | 0 | 0 |
| Me'usharot (Israel) | Eti Dudai | 1 | 1 | 1 | 0 | 0 |
| Me'usharot (Israel) | Dafna Shahar | 1 | 1 | 1 | 0 | 0 |
| Me'usharot (Israel) | Inbar Shenhav | 1 | 1 | 1 | 0 | 1 |
| Me'usharot (Israel) | Yael Gal | 2 | 2 | 1 | 0 | 0 |
| Me'usharot (Israel) | Jennifer Snookel | 2 | 2 | 1 | 0 | 0 |
| Me'usharot (Israel) | Iris Zander | 2 | 2 | 1 | 0 | 0 |
| Me'usharot (Israel) | Keren Ben David | 3 | 3 | 1 | 0 | 0 |
| Me'usharot (Israel) | Phillip Vazana | 3 | 3 | 1 | 0 | 0 |
| Me'usharot (Israel) | Alice Avivi | 3 | 3 | 1 | 0 | 0 |
| Me'usharot (Israel) | Shulamit Afriot von Bismarck | 3 | 3 | 1 | 0 | 0 |
| Me'usharot (Israel) | Elior Kasovich | 3 | 3 | 1 | 0 | 0 |
| Me'usharot (Israel) | Dalya Arzi | 3 | 3 | 1 | 0 | 0 |
| Mulheres Ricas | Narcisa Tamborindeguy | 1 | 2 | 2 | 0 | 0 |
| Mulheres Ricas | Val Marchiori | 1 | 1 | 1 | 1 | 0 |
| Mulheres Ricas | Lydia Sayeg | 1 | 1 | 1 | 1 | 0 |
| Mulheres Ricas | Brunete Fraccaroli | 1 | 1 | 1 | 1 | 0 |
| Mulheres Ricas | Débora Rodrigues | 1 | 1 | 1 | 0 | 0 |
| Mulheres Ricas | Aeileen Varejão | 2 | 2 | 1 | 0 | 0 |
| Mulheres Ricas | Andréa de Nóbrega | 2 | 2 | 1 | 0 | 0 |
| Mulheres Ricas | Mariana Mesquita | 2 | 2 | 1 | 0 | 0 |
| Mulheres Ricas | Cozete Gomes | 2 | 2 | 1 | 0 | 0 |
| Vancouver | Jody Claman | 1 | 2 | 2 | 0 | 0 |
| Vancouver | Christina Kiesel | 1 | 1 | 1 | 0 | 0 |
| Vancouver | Reiko MacKenzie | 1 | 1 | 1 | 0 | 0 |
| Vancouver | Ronnie Negus | 1 | 2 | 2 | 0 | 0 |
| Vancouver | Mary Zilba | 1 | 2 | 2 | 0 | 0 |
| Vancouver | Amanda Hansen | 2 | 2 | 1 | 0 | 0 |
| Vancouver | Robin Reichman | 2 | 2 | 1 | 0 | 0 |
| Vancouver | Ioulia Reynolds | 2 | 2 | 1 | 0 | 0 |
| Toronto | Kara Alloway | 1 | 1 | 1 | 0 | 0 |
| Toronto | Roxy Earle | 1 | 1 | 1 | 0 | 0 |
| Toronto | Ann Kaplan Mulholland | 1 | 1 | 1 | 0 | 0 |
| Toronto | Gregoriane Minot | 1 | 1 | 1 | 0 | 0 |
| Toronto | Joan Kelley Walker | 1 | 1 | 1 | 0 | 0 |
| Toronto | Jana Webb | 1 | 1 | 1 | 0 | 0 |
| Les Vraies Housewives (France) | Soumaya Akaaboune | 1 | 1 | 1 | 0 | 0 |
| Les Vraies Housewives (France) | Christina Amrani | 1 | 1 | 1 | 0 | 0 |
| Les Vraies Housewives (France) | Karine Kaplan | 1 | 1 | 1 | 0 | 0 |
| Les Vraies Housewives (France) | Christine Snider-Decroix | 1 | 1 | 1 | 0 | 0 |
| Les Vraies Housewives (France) | Natalie Wizman | 1 | 1 | 1 | 0 | 0 |
| Melbourne | Jackie Gillies | 1 | 5 | 5 | 0 | 0 |
| Melbourne | Chyka Keebaugh | 1 | 3 | 3 | 1 | 1 |
| Melbourne | Gina Liano | 1 | 4 | 4 | 0 | 0 |
| Melbourne | Andrea Moss | 1 | 1 | 1 | 0 | 0 |
| Melbourne | Janet Roach | 1 | 5 | 5 | 0 | 0 |
| Melbourne | Lydia Schiavello | 1 | 4 | 4 | 0 | 0 |
| Melbourne | Pettifleur Berenger | 2 | 3 | 2 | 0 | 0 |
| Melbourne | Gamble Breaux | 2 | 4 | 4 | 0 | 0 |
| Melbourne | Susie McLean | 3 | 3 | 1 | 0 | 1 |
| Melbourne | Venus Behbahani-Clark | 4 | 4 | 1 | 0 | 0 |
| Melbourne | Sally Bloomfield | 4 | 4 | 1 | 0 | 0 |
| Melbourne | Cherry Dipietrantonio | 5 | 5 | 1 | 0 | 0 |
| Melbourne | Simone Elliot | 5 | 5 | 1 | 0 | 0 |
| Melbourne | Kyla Kirkpatrick | 5 | 5 | 1 | 0 | 0 |
| Melbourne | Anjali Rao | 5 | 5 | 1 | 0 | 0 |
| Sydney | Athena Levendi | 1 | 1 | 1 | 0 | 0 |
| Sydney | Krissy Marsh | 1 | —N/a | 3 | 0 | 0 |
| Sydney | Nicole O'Neil | 1 | 2 | 2 | 0 | 0 |
| Sydney | Lisa Oldfield | 1 | 1 | 1 | 0 | 0 |
| Sydney | Victoria Rees | 1 | 1 | 1 | 0 | 0 |
| Sydney | Matty Samaei | 1 | 1 | 1 | 0 | 0 |
| Sydney | Melissa Tkautz | 1 | 1 | 1 | 0 | 0 |
| Sydney | Kate Adams | 2 | —N/a | 2 | 0 | 0 |
| Sydney | Terry Biviano | 2 | —N/a | 2 | 0 | 0 |
| Sydney | Caroline Gaultier | 2 | —N/a | 2 | 0 | 0 |
| Sydney | Victoria Montano | 2 | —N/a | 2 | 0 | 0 |
| Sydney | Sally Obermeder | 2 | —N/a | 2 | 0 | 0 |
| Cheshire | Tanya Bardsley | 1 | 14 | 14 | 1 | 2 |
| Cheshire | Leanne Brown | 1 | 6 | 6 | 1 | 0 |
| Cheshire | Magali Gorré | 1 | 2 | 2 | 0 | 0 |
| Cheshire | Ampika Pickston | 1 | 5 | 5 | 0 | 1 |
| Cheshire | Lauren Simon | 1 | —N/a | 15 | 0 | 0 |
| Cheshire | Dawn Ward | 1 | 12 | 12 | 0 | 0 |
| Cheshire | Missé Beqiri | 3 | 4 | 2 | 1 | 0 |
| Cheshire | Seema Malhotra | 3 | —N/a | 13 | 0 | 1 |
| Cheshire | Stacey Forsey | 3 | 7 | 5 | 1 | 1 |
| Cheshire | Ester Dohnalová | 5 | 12 | 8 | 2 | 2 |
| Cheshire | Rachel Lugo | 6 | —N/a | 12 | 0 | 0 |
| Cheshire | Nermina Pieters-Mekic | 6 | 7 | 2 | 1 | 5 |
| Cheshire | Hanna Kinsella | 8 | 16 | 9 | 0 | 2 |
| Cheshire | Perla Navia | 8 | 10 | 3 | 0 | 0 |
| Cheshire | Leilani Dowding | 10 | 10 | 1 | 0 | 0 |
| Cheshire | Nicole Sealey | 11 | —N/a | 7 | 0 | 0 |
| Cheshire | Lystra Adams | 12 | —N/a | 6 | 0 | 0 |
| Cheshire | Deborah Davies | 13 | 14 | 2 | 0 | 0 |
| Cheshire | Sheena Lynch | 14 | —N/a | 4 | 0 | 0 |
| Cheshire | Katie Alex | 15 | 16 | 1 | 0 | 1 |
| Cheshire | Natasha Hamilton | 16 | 16 | 1 | 0 | 0 |
| Cheshire | Paige Chohan | 17 | —N/a | 1 | 1 | 1 |
| Cheshire | Ellie Egar | 17 | —N/a | 1 | 0 | 0 |
| Jersey | Tessa Hartmann | 1 | 2 | 2 | 0 | 0 |
| Jersey | Hedi Green | 1 | 1 | 1 | 0 | 1 |
| Jersey | Kate Taylor | 1 | 2 | 2 | 0 | 0 |
| Jersey | Ashley Cairney | 1 | 2 | 2 | 0 | 0 |
| Jersey | Jane Rayner | 1 | 1 | 1 | 0 | 1 |
| Jersey | Margaret Thompson | 1 | 2 | 2 | 0 | 0 |
| Jersey | Mia Ledbury | 1 | 2 | 2 | 0 | 0 |
| Jersey | Sarha Courtnay | 2 | 2 | 1 | 0 | 0 |
| Jersey | Karen Loderick-Peace | 2 | 2 | 1 | 0 | 0 |
| London | Juliet Angus | 1 | —N/a | 1 | 0 | 0 |
| London | Amanda Cronin | 1 | —N/a | 1 | 0 | 0 |
| London | Karen Loderick-Peace | 1 | —N/a | 1 | 0 | 0 |
| London | Juliet Mayhew | 1 | —N/a | 1 | 0 | 0 |
| London | Panthea Parker | 1 | —N/a | 1 | 0 | 0 |
| London | Nessie Welschinger | 1 | —N/a | 1 | 0 | 0 |
| Auckland | Anne Batley-Burton | 1 | 1 | 1 | 0 | 0 |
| Auckland | Michelle Blanchard | 1 | 1 | 1 | 0 | 0 |
| Auckland | Gilda Kirkpatrick | 1 | 1 | 1 | 0 | 0 |
| Auckland | Julia Sloane | 1 | 1 | 1 | 0 | 0 |
| Auckland | Angela Stone | 1 | 1 | 1 | 0 | 0 |
| Auckland | Louise Wallace | 1 | 1 | 1 | 0 | 0 |
| Hungary | Boglárka Csősz | 1 | 4 | 4 | 0 | 0 |
| Hungary | Rita Farkas | 1 | 1 | 1 | 1 | 0 |
| Hungary | Babett Köllő | 1 | 3 | 3 | 0 | 0 |
| Hungary | Réka Rubint | 1 | 1 | 1 | 0 | 0 |
| Hungary | Dalma Smaltig | 1 | 2 | 2 | 0 | 0 |
| Hungary | Vivien Vasvári | 1 | 3 | 3 | 0 | 0 |
| Hungary | Yvonne Dederick | 2 | 4 | 3 | 1 | 0 |
| Hungary | Tünde Polgár | 2 | 4 | 3 | 0 | 0 |
| Hungary | Nikolett Molnár | 3 | 4 | 2 | 0 | 0 |
| Hungary | Noémi Nagy | 3 | 4 | 2 | 0 | 0 |
| Hungary | Anfisa Bulgakova | 4 | 4 | 1 | 0 | 0 |
| Johannesburg | Evodia Mogase | 1 | 1 | 1 | 0 | 0 |
| Johannesburg | Mercy Mogase | 1 | 1 | 1 | 0 | 0 |
| Johannesburg | Brinnette Seopela | 1 | 2 | 2 | 0 | 0 |
| Johannesburg | Naledi Willers | 1 | 1 | 1 | 0 | 0 |
| Johannesburg | Christall Kay | 1 | 2 | 2 | 0 | 0 |
| Johannesburg | Busisiwe Ter Mors | 1 | 1 | 1 | 0 | 0 |
| Johannesburg | Lebo JoJo Gunguluza | 2 | —N/a | 2 | 0 | 0 |
| Johannesburg | Lethabo Mathatho | 2 | —N/a | 2 | 0 | 0 |
| Johannesburg | Mpho Merriweather | 2 | 2 | 1 | 0 | 0 |
| Johannesburg | Mpumi Mophatlane | 2 | 2 | 1 | 0 | 0 |
| Johannesburg | Tarina Patel | 2 | —N/a | 1 | 1 | 0 |
| Johannesburg | Mareli Bentley | 3 | —N/a | 1 | 0 | 0 |
| Johannesburg | Mamus Koka | 3 | —N/a | 1 | 0 | 0 |
| Johannesburg | Keabetswe Marema | 3 | —N/a | 1 | 0 | 0 |
| Johannesburg | Thobekile Mdlalose | 3 | —N/a | 1 | 0 | 0 |
| Johannesburg | Nicole Watson | 3 | —N/a | 1 | 0 | 0 |
| Durban | Annie Mthembu | 1 | 3 | 3 | 0 | 1 |
| Durban | Sorisha Naidoo | 1 | —N/a | 3 | 0 | 0 |
| Durban | Nonku Williams | 1 | —N/a | 3 | 0 | 0 |
| Durban | Nonkanyiso Conco | 1 | 2 | 2 | 0 | 0 |
| Durban | Kgomotso Ndungane | 1 | 2 | 1 | 0 | 1 |
| Durban | Ayanda Ncwane | 1 | 1 | 1 | 0 | 0 |
| Durban | Thobile Khumalo Mseleku | 2 | 2 | 1 | 0 | 0 |
| Durban | Londiwe Zulu-Nkosi | 2 | 2 | 1 | 0 | 1 |
| Durban | JoJo Robinson | 2 | —N/a | 2 | 0 | 0 |
| Durban | Slindile Wendy Ndlovu | 3 | —N/a | 1 | 0 | 0 |
| Durban | Mbaliyesizwe Ngiba | 3 | 3 | 1 | 0 | 0 |
| Durban | Maria Valaskatzis | 3 | —N/a | 1 | 0 | 0 |
| Durban | Nqobile Ndlela | 4 | —N/a | 1 | 0 | 0 |
| Durban | Zamaswazi Ngcobo | 4 | —N/a | 1 | 0 | 0 |
| Durban | Ameigh Sibahle Thompson | 4 | —N/a | 1 | 0 | 0 |
| Cape Town | Beverley Steyn | 1 | —N/a | 1 | 0 | 0 |
| Cape Town | Rushda Moosajee | 1 | —N/a | 1 | 0 | 0 |
| Cape Town | Loveline Abinokhauno | 1 | —N/a | 1 | 0 | 0 |
| Cape Town | Thato Montse | 1 | —N/a | 1 | 0 | 0 |
| Cape Town | Camilla McDowell | 1 | —N/a | 1 | 0 | 0 |
| Cape Town | Kutazwa Gqirana | 1 | —N/a | 1 | 0 | 0 |
| Cape Town | Lulwando Tukwayo | 1 | —N/a | 1 | 0 | 0 |
| Pretoria | Renske Lammerding | 1 | —N/a | 1 | 0 | 0 |
| Pretoria | Kiki La Coco | 1 | —N/a | 1 | 0 | 0 |
| Pretoria | Mel Viljoen | 1 | —N/a | 1 | 0 | 0 |
| Pretoria | Rhona Erasmus | 1 | —N/a | 1 | 0 | 0 |
| Pretoria | Marié Bosman | 1 | —N/a | 1 | 0 | 0 |
| Pretoria | Talana Kuhn | 1 | —N/a | 1 | 0 | 0 |
| Gqeberha | Norma Nicol | 1 | —N/a | 1 | 0 | 0 |
| Gqeberha | Buli G Ngomane | 1 | —N/a | 1 | 0 | 0 |
| Gqeberha | Liz Prins | 1 | —N/a | 1 | 0 | 0 |
| Gqeberha | Unathi Faku | 1 | —N/a | 1 | 0 | 0 |
| Gqeberha | Ashleigh Mather | 1 | —N/a | 1 | 0 | 0 |
| Cape Winelands | Candice Bester | 1 | —N/a | 1 | 0 | 0 |
| Cape Winelands | Amy Kleinhans | 1 | —N/a | 1 | 0 | 0 |
| Cape Winelands | Anita Lloyd | 1 | —N/a | 1 | 0 | 0 |
| Cape Winelands | Karen Schwendtke | 1 | —N/a | 1 | 0 | 0 |
| Cape Winelands | Mariska Thorpe | 1 | —N/a | 1 | 0 | 0 |
| Cape Winelands | Michelle van Zyl | 1 | —N/a | 1 | 0 | 0 |
| Naples | Daniela Sabella | 1 | 2 | 2 | 0 | 0 |
| Naples | Maria Consiglio Visco Marigliano del Monte | 1 | 2 | 2 | 0 | 0 |
| Naples | Raffaella Siervo | 1 | 2 | 2 | 0 | 0 |
| Naples | Simonetta De Luca | 1 | 2 | 2 | 0 | 0 |
| Naples | Stella Giannicola | 1 | 2 | 2 | 0 | 0 |
| Naples | Noemi Letizia | 1 | 1 | 1 | 0 | 0 |
| Naples | Alessandra Parlato | 2 | 2 | 1 | 0 | 0 |
| Naples | Januaria Piromallo | 2 | 2 | 1 | 0 | 0 |
| Rome | Camilla Ancilotto | 1 | —N/a | 1 | 0 | 0 |
| Rome | Teresa Bolegnese | 1 | —N/a | 1 | 0 | 0 |
| Rome | Vanessa Ciampa | 1 | —N/a | 1 | 0 | 0 |
| Rome | Flora Pellino | 1 | —N/a | 1 | 0 | 0 |
| Rome | Nicoletta Ricca Benedetti | 1 | —N/a | 1 | 0 | 0 |
| Rome | Anadela Serra Visconti | 1 | —N/a | 1 | 0 | 0 |
| Slovenia | Andreja Medvedič | 1 | 1 | 1 | 0 | 0 |
| Slovenia | Carmen Osovnikar | 1 | 1 | 1 | 0 | 0 |
| Slovenia | Gordana Grandošek Whiddon | 1 | 1 | 1 | 0 | 0 |
| Slovenia | Pike Zrim | 1 | 1 | 1 | 0 | 0 |
| Slovenia | Špela Kastelic | 1 | 1 | 1 | 0 | 0 |
| Slovenia | Nika Čukur | 1 | 1 | 1 | 0 | 0 |
| Lagos | Carolyna Hutchings | 1 | 1 | 1 | 0 | 0 |
| Lagos | Laura Ikeji | 1 | —N/a | 2 | 0 | 0 |
| Lagos | Chioma Ikokwu | 1 | —N/a | 2 | 0 | 0 |
| Lagos | Toyin Lawani-Adebayo | 1 | —N/a | 2 | 0 | 0 |
| Lagos | Iyabo Ojo | 1 | —N/a | 2 | 0 | 0 |
| Lagos | Mariam Timmer | 1 | —N/a | 2 | 0 | 0 |
| Lagos | Faith Morey | 2 | —N/a | 1 | 0 | 0 |
| Lagos | Tania Omotayo | 2 | —N/a | 1 | 0 | 0 |
| Abuja | Arafa | 1 | —N/a | 1 | 0 | 0 |
| Abuja | Comfort Booth | 1 | —N/a | 1 | 0 | 0 |
| Abuja | Ojoma Sule | 1 | —N/a | 1 | 0 | 0 |
| Abuja | Princess Jecoco | 1 | —N/a | 1 | 0 | 0 |
| Abuja | Samantha Homossany | 1 | —N/a | 1 | 0 | 0 |
| Abuja | Tutupie | 1 | —N/a | 1 | 0 | 0 |
| Amsterdam | Maria Tailor | 1 | —N/a | 4 | 0 | 0 |
| Amsterdam | Hella Huizinga | 1 | 2 | 2 | 0 | 1 |
| Amsterdam | Cherry-Ann Person | 1 | 4 | 4 | 0 | 0 |
| Amsterdam | Kimmylien Nguyen | 1 | —N/a | 5 | 0 | 0 |
| Amsterdam | Sheila Bergeik | 1 | 1 | 1 | 0 | 0 |
| Amsterdam | Susanna Klibansky | 1 | 2 | 2 | 0 | 0 |
| Amsterdam | Djamila Celina Melcherts | 1 | —N/a | 5 | 0 | 0 |
| Amsterdam | Tamara Elbaz | 2 | —N/a | 3 | 0 | 0 |
| Amsterdam | Angela van den Brink | 3 | 3 | 1 | 0 | 2 |
| Amsterdam | Deborah Luijendijk | 3 | 3 | 1 | 0 | 0 |
| Amsterdam | Niama Amhali | 4 | —N/a | 2 | 0 | 1 |
| Amsterdam | Floor Coster | 4 | —N/a | 2 | 0 | 0 |
| Amsterdam | Lilian Dziedzic | 4 | —N/a | 2 | 0 | 0 |
| Amsterdam | Elvira Penthesilea | 4 | 4 | 1 | 0 | 0 |
| Amsterdam | Renée Vervoorn | 4 | —N/a | 2 | 0 | 0 |
| South Netherlands | Annu Bachu | 1 | 1 | 1 | 0 | 0 |
| South Netherlands | Lizbeth van den Boogaart | 1 | —N/a | 2 | 0 | 0 |
| South Netherlands | Petrouschka Dahmen | 1 | —N/a | 2 | 0 | 0 |
| South Netherlands | Estelle Hanneman | 1 | —N/a | 2 | 0 | 0 |
| South Netherlands | Ramona Koonings | 1 | —N/a | 2 | 0 | 0 |
| South Netherlands | Chayenne Muller | 1 | —N/a | 2 | 0 | 0 |
| South Netherlands | Brigitte Schepers | 1 | —N/a | 2 | 0 | 0 |
| South Netherlands | Marjan Strijbosch | 1 | —N/a | 2 | 0 | 0 |
| Nairobi | Susan Kaittany | 1 | 1 | 1 | 0 | 0 |
| Nairobi | Vera Sidika | 1 | —N/a | 1 | 0 | 0 |
| Nairobi | Sonal Maherali | 1 | 1 | 1 | 0 | 0 |
| Nairobi | Minne Kariuki | 1 | —N/a | 1 | 0 | 0 |
| Nairobi | Lisa Christoffersen | 1 | 1 | 1 | 0 | 0 |
| Nairobi | Farah Esmail | 2 | —N/a | 1 | 0 | 1 |
| Nairobi | Rejah Keji Ladu | 2 | —N/a | 1 | 0 | 0 |
| Nairobi | Zena Nyambu | 2 | —N/a | 1 | 0 | 0 |
| Warsaw | Anita Kuś-Munsaje | 1 | 1 | 1 | 0 | 0 |
| Warsaw | Magda Pyć-Leszczuk | 1 | 1 | 1 | 0 | 0 |
| Warsaw | Barbara Sobczak | 1 | 1 | 1 | 0 | 0 |
| Warsaw | Anna Szubierajska | 1 | 1 | 1 | 0 | 0 |
| Warsaw | Monika Żochowska | 1 | 1 | 1 | 0 | 0 |
| Warsaw | Sara Koślińska | 1 | 1 | 1 | 0 | 0 |
| Warsaw | Kasia Przydryga | 1 | 1 | 1 | 0 | 0 |
| Warsaw | Anna Wrońska | 1 | 1 | 1 | 0 | 1 |
| Antwerp | Julie Boone | 1 | 2 | 2 | 0 | 0 |
| Antwerp | Amy De Winter | 1 | —N/a | 3 | 0 | 0 |
| Antwerp | Oona Noyen | 1 | 1 | 1 | 0 | 1 |
| Antwerp | Kiki Rom Colthoff | 1 | —N/a | 3 | 0 | 0 |
| Antwerp | Annelies Schetters | 1 | —N/a | 3 | 0 | 0 |
| Antwerp | Melissa van Hoydonck | 1 | —N/a | 3 | 0 | 0 |
| Antwerp | Natassia Van Kerkvoorde | 1 | —N/a | 3 | 0 | 0 |
| Antwerp | Camelia Craciunescu | 2 | 2 | 1 | 0 | 0 |
| Antwerp | Jill Cnudde | 3 | —N/a | 1 | 0 | 1 |
| Antwerp | Laura Carpels | 3 | —N/a | 1 | 0 | 0 |

List of The Real Housewives international housewives' friends
| Installment | Friends | First season appeared | Last season appeared | Number of seasons | |
| Installment | Friends | First season appeared | Last season appeared | Friend | Guest |
|---|---|---|---|---|---|
| Me'usharot (Israel) | Bridget | 3 | 3 | 1 | 0 |
| Mulheres Ricas | Regina Mansur | 2 | 2 | 1 | 0 |
| Vancouver | Mia Deakin | 1 | 2 | 2 | 0 |
| Vancouver | Marika Palmer | 1 | 1 | 1 | 1 |
| Melbourne | Lisa Tonkin | 1 | 3 | 1 | 2 |
| Melbourne | Manuela Pless-Bennett | 2 | 2 | 1 | 0 |
| Cheshire | Chantelle Heskey | 2 | 4 | 1 | 2 |
| Cheshire | Katie Kane | 6 | 15 | 1 | 7 |
| Cheshire | Christine McGuinness | 7 | 11 | 3 | 2 |
| Cheshire | Karen Loderick-Peace | 15 | 15 | 1 | 0 |
| Cheshire | Ashley Stobart | 15 | 15 | 1 | 0 |
| Hungary | Catherine Dederick | 2 | 4 | 3 | 1 |
| Hungary | Páris Mihályi | 2 | 4 | 3 | 1 |
| Hungary | Olivér Pusztai | 3 | 3 | 1 | 1 |
| Johannesburg | Lerika Kleinhans | 1 | 2 | 1 | 1 |
| Johannesburg | Olwethu Leshabane | 1 | 1 | 1 | 0 |
| Johannesburg | Nthabiseng "Chef Nti" Ramaboa | 1 | 1 | 1 | 0 |
| Johannesburg | Bridgette Sutter | 2 | 2 | 1 | 0 |
| Durban | Thobekile Ndlovu | 1 | 1 | 1 | 0 |
| Durban | Mabusi Seme | 1 | 2 | 2 | 1 |
| Durban | Sanelisiwe Bhengu | 3 | 3 | 1 | 0 |
| Cape Winelands | Nicole Wilmans | 1 | —N/a | 1 | —N/a |
| Amsterdam | Magali Gorré | 1 | 2 | 1 | 1 |
| South Netherlands | Claudia Brugman | 2 | —N/a | 1 | —N/a |
| Lagos | Priscilla Ajoke Ojo | 1 | —N/a | 2 | 0 |
| Lagos | Paul O | 2 | —N/a | 1 | 0 |
| Lagos | Vanessa Onyinye | 2 | —N/a | 1 | 0 |
| Lagos | Rommel Asagwara | 2 | —N/a | 1 | 0 |
| Warsaw | Anna Wrońska | 1 | 1 | 1 | 0 |
| Munich | Djamila Celina Melcherts | 1 | 1 | 1 | 0 |
| Antwerp | Debby Gommeren | 1 | 2 | 1 | 1 |
