= The Real Housewives of Munich =

German reality television series

- Genre: Reality television
- Based on: The Real Housewives
- Starring: Carina Wild; Joana Danciu; Lilli Wilmes; Natalie Fuchs; Pegah Parastar; Seher Künstner
- Country of origin: Germany
- Original language: German
- No. of seasons: 1
- No. of episodes: 6

Production
- Production locations: Munich, Bavaria, Germany
- Camera setup: Multiple
- Running time: 43 minutes
- Production company: Tresor TV

Original release
- Network: RTL+
- Release: 6 July – 20 July 2024

The Real Housewives of Munich, abbreviated RHOMUC, is a German reality television series that premiered on streaming-service RTL+ on 6 July 2024. Developed as an international installment of the American The Real Housewives franchise, it aired one season and focused on the personal and professional lives of several women living in Munich, Germany.

== Overview ==
The Real Housewives of Munich was officially announced on 6 June 2024. Developed as an international installment of the American The Real Housewives franchise, it is the first German installment of the franchise. Djamila Celina Melcherts, known for her appearance in The Real Housewives of Amsterdam, served as "Friend" in the first season.

On 6 July 2024 the first two episodes were released on German streaming service RTL+. The first season contains six episodes, with the last two episodes, released on 20 July 2024.

After generating only moderate viewing numbers, RTL decided to cancel the series after one season. The show also had some negative reviews with the Housewives facing sharp criticism due to the show.

== Cast ==
=== Main ===
- Carina Wild
- Joana Danciu
- Lilli Wilmes
- Natalie Fuchs
- Pegah Parastar
- Seher Künstner

=== Recurring ===
- Djamila Celina Melcherts

== Episodes ==
No.	Title	Original release date
1	"Folge 1"	6 July 2024
Pegah's husband surprises her with a luxury family car. They drive straight to St. Moritz for the exclusive snow polo tournament. Natalie invites everyone to a dinner, which becomes emotional thanks to a visit from a fortune teller.
2	"Folge 2"	6 July 2024
Some of the ladies attend an exclusive ball, but first, Natalie needs to be introduced to Bavarian traditions. A property search goes completely differently than planned. At a cocktail party, an argument breaks out among the women.
3	"Folge 3"	13 July 2024
Natalie breaks up with her partner and is distraught. A speed dating event organized by the women ends in a heated argument, after which one of the women leaves the show.
4	"Folge 4"	13 July 2024
Lili invites the women on an exclusive trip to Mallorca. At dinner in the luxurious villa, a surprise guest causes a stir. But it doesn't take long before tempers flare and an argument erupts.
5	"Folge 5"	20 July 2024
The planned "Puppy Yoga" causes confusion because the dogs are missing. The question is: What now? They continue by helicopter to South Tyrol for lunch, where Natalie must overcome her fear of flying.
6	"Folge 6"	20 July 2024
Joana opens her long-planned fashion store. But due to past disputes, she doesn't invite all the women—an affront.
