= The Real Housewives of South Netherlands =

- The Real Housewives van het Zuiden
- Genre: Reality television
- Based on: The Real Housewives
- Presented by: Carlo Boszhard (s. 1); Nikkie de Jager (s. 2–)
- Starring: Annu Bachu; Marjan Strijbosch; Chayenne Muller; Estelle Hanneman; Lizbeth van den Boogaart; Petrouschka Dahmen; Ramona Koonings; Brigitte Schepers
- Country of origin: Netherlands
- Original language: Dutch
- No. of seasons: 2
- No. of episodes: 22

Production
- Executive producer: Freek Haverman
- Producer: Roy Aalderink
- Production locations: Dutch Limburg and North Brabant, Netherlands
- Production company: Concept Street

Original release
- Network: Videoland
- Release: 18 April 2025 – present

Related
- The Real Housewives of Amsterdam; The Real Housewives of Rotterdam; The Real Housewives of Antwerp

The Real Housewives of South Netherlands (Dutch: The Real Housewives van het Zuiden), often abbreviated as RHVHZ, is a Dutch reality television series that premiered on Videoland on 18 April 2025. Created as an international installment of the Real Housewives franchise, it documents the personal and professional lives of eight different 'high society' housewives from the south of the country, in the Dutch Provinces of North Brabant and Limburg in the South of the Netherlands. This is the second Dutch version of The Real Housewives, after The Real Housewives of Amsterdam. This series is the 28th international installment of the American series The Real Housewives.

This series is the 15th iteration of a franchise for The Real Housewives in Europe alone.

The first season consisted of original cast members: Annu Bachu, Marjan Strijbosch, Chayenne Muller, Estelle Hanneman, Lizbeth van den Boogaart, Petrouschka Dahmen, Ramona Koonings and Brigitte Schepers as main cast members. The cast for the upcoming second season of the show consists of: Strijbosch, Muller, Hanneman, van den Boogaart, Dahmen, Koonings and Schepers as main cast members with Claudia Brugman joining the show as a "Friend of" cast member.

The premiere episode of the show was also broadcast on RTL 4 in the Netherlands as well. The show also aired on Play in Belgium.

== Cast ==
Cast member	Seasons	
Cast member	1	2
Annu Bachu	Main	
Lizbeth van den Boogaart	Main	Main
Petrouschka Dahmen	Main	Main
Estelle Hanneman	Main	Main
Ramona Koonings	Main	Main
Chayenne Muller	Main	Main
Brigitte Schepers	Main	Main
Marjan Strijbosch	Main	Main
Friends of the housewives
Claudia Brugman		Friend

== Episodes ==
Series	Episodes	Originally released	
Series	Episodes	First released	Last released
1	9	18 April 2025	6 June 2025
2	13	24 April 2026	10 July 2026

=== Season 1 (2025) ===
Annu Bachu, Marjan Strijbosch, Chayenne Muller, Estelle Hanneman, Lizbeth van den Boogaart, Petrouschka Dahmen, Ramona Koonings and Brigitte Schepers are introduced as series regulars.

No. overall	No. in series	Title	Original release date
1	1	"Ik heb een bodyguard, ja"	18 April 2025
Chayenne invites her friends to a charity gala, some of whom bring a plus-one. When the women all get to know each other, it results in some special reactions. When Brigitte and Annu go house hunting, Brigitte comes face to face with her rival Marjan.
2	2	"Wie is hier de golddigger?"	18 April 2025
Liz organizes a Mexican party to get to know all the women better, but during a question round, some are left to choose. When the women all accept Marjan's invitation, it turns out that Ramona and Marjan both have different memories of Marjan's wedding.
3	3	"Praat niet over dingen waar je geen weet van hebt"	25 April 2025
The ladies prepare for a fairytale party to celebrate Estelle's husband's fiftieth birthday. While preparations are in full swing, Brigitte receives a voice message from her 'rival' Marjan, which leads to tensions and confrontations within the group.
4	4	"Al die grijze muizen die oordelen, weet je hoe dom dat is?"	2 May 2025
Marjan is now truly part of the cast. During dinner, tension rises when Chayenne makes a comment about Brigitte's dog, which doesn't sit well with Brigitte at all. Dire emotions surface and conversations take surprising turns.
5	5	"Ze heeft me k*twijf genoemd!"	9 May 2025
After a rowdy sleepover, the ladies wake up with tension in the air. During breakfast everyone tries to save the mood, but things quickly escalate. Chayenne calls Brigitte a bitch, which makes the bombshell explode. Brigitte is furious, the others are shocked. What should have been a pleasant morning turns into a complete disaster.
6	6	"Champagne streken in Reims"	16 May 2025
In Reims, France, Annu tries to repair her bond with Brigitte, but that proves difficult. Meanwhile, Marjan casts doubt on Chayenne's wealth, which divides the group. What originally was supposed to be a glamorous champagne trip ends in tension and mistrust.
7	7	"Ik ga nu weg, want dit komt niet goed"	23 May 2025
During a luxurious lunch at Château Neercanne (in Reims, France), tensions escalate between Brigitte and Annu when Brigitte confronts her about accusations of 'aggressive touching'. Annu angrily leaves the table to avoid further escalation, but returns later—and despite an altercation, the ladies close the episode with an unexpected hug.
8	8	"Champagne-gate: de finale"	30 May 2025
Ramona has prepared her fairytale castle for the grand finale. What starts as a glamorous ending with champagne, quickly turns into an explosive drama showdown when Brigitte strongly criticizes Annu's gift, a special bottle of champagne. This perceived insult leads to “champagne-gate”: the moment when the entire group wonders what the real intention was.
9	9	"De Reünie"	6 June 2025
During the reunion, the ladies look back with Carlo Boszhard on all the quarrels, friendships and dramas of the season. Old wounds are reopened, especially between Marjan and Brigitte, and not everyone leaves the reunion as friends.

=== Season 2 (2026) ===
Bachu departed as a series regular. Claudia Brugman served in a recurring capacity.

No. overall	No. in series	Title	Original release date
10	1	"Nieuwe Zomer, Nieuwe Kansen"	24 April 2026
11	2	"Schuitje Varen, Champagne Drinken"	24 April 2026
12	3	"Krokodillentranen"	1 May 2026
13	4	"Ongeschreven Regels"	8 May 2026
14	5	"Breaking Juice"	15 May 2026
15	6	"Miljonairs & Butterflies"	22 May 2026
16	7	"Vriendinnen Of Verraders"	29 May 2026
17	8	"Dias De Los Muertos"	5 June 2026
18	9	"The Day After"	12 June 2026
19	10	"Hello Dubai"	19 June 2026
20	11	"Dubai Drama"	26 June 2026
21	12	"Het Laatste Avondmaal"	3 July 2026
22	13	"De Reünie: De Eindafrekening"	10 July 2026

== Production ==
After the success of The Real Housewives of Amsterdam, the network and production company decided to see which other cities would be interesting for their franchise for The Real Housewives. The producer came into contact with a number of interesting women in North Brabant, but they were not all from the same city. Hence it was decided to change the title to an area instead of city with the show was originally conceptualized as, The Real Housewives of North Brabant/The Real Housewives of Dutch Brabant (Dutch: The Real Housewives of Brabant). A test pilot was recorded in early 2024 in which Ramona Koonings, Nathellie Holzken and Dagmar Pijnappels were mentioned as the three big names being slated to join the show. The show remained being still titled The Real Housewives of Brabant. After the filming of the test pilot, the show went quiet until it was announced on 2 October 2024, that it would continue and be picked up as a show, in which Nathellie Holzken and Dagmar Pijnappels would no longer participate, but Ramona Koonings would, and the title had been changed to The Real Housewives of South Netherlands (Dutch: The Real Housewives van het Zuiden) due to the fact that a shift in the women occurred with several women from the Dutch province of Limburg were now also participating.

The first season was reportedly filmed from June 2024 to January 2025. In addition, it was originally intended that Marjan Strijbosch would participate as a "Friend of" during the first season, but due to unexpected twists in the story and the mutual relationships, she was later upgraded to the main cast at the insistence of the English producers. As a result, Strijbosch is less present or not present at all during the group activities for the first two episodes. The reunion was filmed on 30 April 2025 and like the Amsterdam version, it was presented by Carlo Boszhard.

During the airing of the final regular episode of the first season, on 30 May 2025, it was announced that the show was renewed for a second season. Strijbosch was the first to be announced as returning to the show for the second season. Koonings was also later confirmed to be returning, while Bachu departed from the series and Claudia Brugman joined the show as a "Friend of" cast member.

During the post-production of the second season, the show was renewed for a third season. With Koonigns, Van den Boogaart, and Muller already announced to return. Later is was announced the departure of Hanneman. Friend of the show Claudia Brugman promoted to main housewive.
