= The Real Housewives of Antwerp =

- Genre: Reality television
- Based on: The Real Housewives
- Presented by: Jani Kazaltzis
- Starring: Melissa van Hoydonck; Amy De Winter; Julie Boone; Annelies Schetters; Kiki Rom Colthoff; Natassia Van Kerkvoorde; Oona Noyen; Camelia Craciunescu; Jill Cnudde; Laura Carpels
- Country of origin: Belgium
- Original languages: Flemish; Dutch
- No. of seasons: 2
- No. of episodes: 16

Production
- Producer: Isabelle Dams
- Production locations: Antwerp, Flanders, Belgium
- Production company: Banijay Belgium

Original release
- Network: Play4 (Season 1 TV Telecast); Play (TV Telecast since Season 2); Streamz (Streaming Telecast)
- Release: 17 March 2025 – present

Related
- The Real Housewives of Amsterdam; The Real Housewives van het Zuiden; The Real Housewives of Rotterdam

The Real Housewives of Antwerp, often abbreviated as RHOANT, is a Flemish language-Belgian reality television series that premiered on Play4 and Streamz on 17 March 2025. Created as an international installment of the Real Housewives franchise, it documents the personal and professional lives of several women residing in Antwerp, Flanders. This is the first Belgian version of The Real Housewives. This series is the 27th international installment of the American series The Real Housewives.

This series is the 14th iteration of a franchise for The Real Housewives in Europe alone.

The first season consisted of original cast members: Melissa van Hoydonck, Amy De Winter, Julie Boone, Annelies Schetters, Kiki Rom Colthoff, Natassia Van Kerkvoorde and Oona Noyen as main cast members, while Debby Gommeren served as a "Friend of the Housewives" castmember. The cast for the upcoming second season of the show consists of: van Hoydonck, De Winter, Boone, Schetters, Colthoff, Van Kervoorde as main cast members with Camelia Craciunescu joining the show as a main cast member.

The series has been available to stream on Videoland in the Netherlands since 6 June 2025.

== Cast ==
| Cast member | Seasons | | |
| Cast member | 1 | 2 | 3 |
|---|---|---|---|
| Julie Boone | Main | Main | |
| Amy De Winter | Main | Main | Main |
| Oona Noyen | Main | Guest | Guest |
| Kiki Rom Colthoff | Main | Main | Main |
| Annelies Schetters | Main | Main | Main |
| Melissa Van Hoydonck | Main | Main | Main |
| Natassia Van Kerkvoorde | Main | Main | Main |
| Camelia Craciunescu | | Main | |
| Laura Carpels | | | Main |
| Jill Cnudde | | Guest | Main |
Friends of the housewives
| Debby Gommeren | Friend | Guest | |

== Episodes ==
| Series | Episodes | Originally released | |
| Series | Episodes | First released | Last released |
|---|---|---|---|
| 1 | 8 | 17 March 2025 | 30 May 2025 |
| 2 | 8 | 18 March 2026 | 23 May 2026 |
| 3 | TBA | TBA | TBA |

=== Season 1 (2025) ===
Melissa van Hoydonck, Amy De Winter, Julie Boone, Annelies Schetters, Kiki Rom Colthoff, Natassia Van Kerkvoorde and Oona Noyen are introduced as series regulars. Debby Gommeren served in a recurring capacity.

| No. overall | No. in series | Title | Original release date |
|---|---|---|---|
| 1 | 1 | "The Real Housewarming" | 17 March 2025 |
Natassia's house is complete and she decides to invite everyone to her housewarming party. Her husband Wout is allowed to prepare the food, but Annelies has her own opinion about that. At dinner, tensions run high when Amy brings up an old "feud" between her and Julie.
| 2 | 2 | "Catfight on the Catwalk" | 17 March 2025 |
Julie has a gender reveal party, but is stressed that it will end in a fight after the dinner at Natassia's housewarming party. However, Julie's best friend seems to be throwing a wrench in the works. Natassia's aversion to Amy is growing.
| 3 | 3 | "There's Something About Amy" | 17 March 2025 |
After the fashion show, Amy is unhappy about how the other women treated her. While Oona tries to resolve the situation during an event organized by Annelies, the clash seems to become bigger than it should be.
| 4 | 4 | "Game, Set, Match" | 17 March 2025 |
Melissa, Natassia and Amy try to talk out their mutual feuds during a conversation. This seems to have worked and Natassia invites everyone for a weekend in Durbuy, located in the Belgian Province of Luxembourg in Wallonia, Belgium.
| 5 | 5 | "Smelly Catfights in Durbuy (Durbuy Part One)" | 17 March 2025 |
After arriving in Durbuy, Natassia felt that she did not receive the gratitude that she had expected from all of the other women. Although Natassia resigns herself to the situation, a dinner at a Michelin-starred restaurant seems to be the last straw. All her frustrations come to light during the dinner and are directed towards Amy, as a result, it becomes too much for Oona to handle as well.
| 6 | 6 | "Durbuy Part Two" | 17 March 2025 |
There is a cold war between Annelies and Amy on one side and Natassia, Melissa, Oona and Kiki on the other. Nevertheless, Kiki decides to go to Amy's dog Ralphie's birthday party.
| 7 | 7 | "Knocked Off" | 17 March 2025 |
Kiki and Natassia decide to further enhance the good atmosphere by inviting all the ladies to Knokke, West Flanders. However, Annelies' plus one throws a wrench in the plan.
| 8 | 8 | "De Reünie" | 30 May 2025 |
A few months after the eventful party in Knokke, host Jani Kazaltzis welcomes the seven women for the long-awaited reunion.

=== Season 2 (2026) ===
Noyen departed as a series regular. Camelia Craciunescu joined the cast.

| No. overall | No. in series | Title | Original release date |
|---|---|---|---|
| 9 | 1 | "Karma Camelia" | 18 March 2026 |
After Oona's departure the ladies receive an invitation from Queen Camelia. She want to leave the drama behind, but is shocked as Natassia and Annelies attack each other during a "light lunch".
| 10 | 2 | "Het drama is in de sacoche." | 18 March 2026 |
Natassia experiences an emotional moment with her mother as she tries on her wedding dress. Melissa and Amy work on their friendship, Camelia hopes for peace during her Delvaux-event, until the situation between Melissa and Kiki explodes.
| 11 | 3 | "La Butte aux Bois" | 18 March 2026 |
Kiki hopes for a calm birthday at luxury hotel "La Butte Aux Bois", but Melissa is still upset about the Delvaux-incident. Kiki loses it when her best friend, until now at least, Natassia, doesn't jump to defend her honour.
| 12 | 4 | "When Amy met Arthur" | 18 March 2026 |
Despite not being invited to Natassia's wedding, love is still in the air with Amy and Annelies. They go on a citytrip to Paris. The other women try to keep the peace at Natassia's wedding.
| 13 | 5 | "Right on time for the party" | 18 March 2026 |
Annelies celebrates her 25th cosmetic procedure with a massive Plastic is Fantastic-party. On the guest list: Debby Gommeren and Aisha Van Zele. Natassia cancels: is she on a 'high' or is she not amused by the presence of old enemies?
| 14 | 6 | ""Moeder Teresa" gaat Paintballen" | 18 March 2026 |
Amy goes to the gynaecologist to discover if she has a "beautiful pearl". Natassia organises an event for charity, where she and Annelies confront each other. Time to let loose during a game of paintball.
| 15 | 7 | "To Copycat or not To Copycat?" | 18 March 2026 |
The women are disappointed that "the men" aren't invited to Amy's 30th birthday. Amy goes all-in on luxury and style. When it is revealed that Amy does certain unexpected announcements, the party turns into a "Party Crash".
| 16 | 8 | "De Reünie van de Waarheid" | 23 May 2026 |
Kiki and Melissa try to make peace before the big reunion. Host Jani Kazaltzis pulls out all the stops to resolve the ladies' feuds one by one. Or will a few new revelations add fuel to the fire?

=== Season 3 ===
Boone and Craciunescu departed as a series regular. Jill Cnudde and Laura Carpels joined the cast.

== Production ==
After the success of The Real Housewives of Amsterdam in the Netherlands, Play4 and Streamz started casting for a Flemish franchise. The show was originally conceptualized as, The Real Housewives of Flanders, but during the final phases of the casting process, it was clear that a majority of the women either came from Antwerp or primarily resided there.

After a long casting process, the producers agreed on the cast consisting of: Melissa van Hoydonck, Amy De Winter, Julie Boone, Annelies Schetters, Kiki Rom Colthoff, Natassia Van Kerkvoorde, and Oona Noyen, with Debby Gommeren serving as a "Friend of" cast member. Jill Lilly Cnudde was also supposed to be a cast member on the show after a successful guest appearance on The Real Housewives of Amsterdam, but did take part in the show due to some the producers feeling that Cnudde was too young to be "Housewife" on the show. The first season ran from 17 March 2025 to 30 May 2025.

Prior to the Season 1 reunion, Noyen announced her departure from the show after feeling that the show wasn't what she thought it was going to be. The other women did not know if a second season would happen. Filming for the second season began in June 2025 with "Friend of" Gommeren departing the show and Camelia Craciunescu joining the cast full time. Aisha Van Zele stated that she was approached to take part in the second season but turned down the offer.

Camelia Craciunescu announced on social media her departure from the show on 2 July 2026. Also Julie Boone announced her departure on social media the day after. The third season was confirmed on July 30, 2026, with De Winter, Rom Colthoff, Schetters, Van Hoydonck, and Van Kerkvoorde all returning. Jill Cnudde and Laura Carpels are joining the cast. Cnudde previously made a guest appearance in the second season and also made a guest appearance in The Real Housewives of Amsterdam. Van Kerkvoorde left the series during the filming of the third season.
