= The Real Housewives of Warsaw =

2023 Polish reality television series

- Genre: Reality television
- Based on: The Real Housewives
- Presented by: Krzysztof Ibisz
- Starring: Anita Kuś-Munsaje; Magda Pyć-Leszczuk; Barbara Sobczak; Anna Szubierajska; Monika Żochowska; Sara Koślińska; Kasia Przydryga; Monika Goździalska
- Country of origin: Poland
- Original language: Polish
- No. of seasons: 1
- No. of episodes: 12

Production
- Production locations: Warsaw, Masovia, Poland
- Production company: Rochstar TV

Original release
- Network: Polsat
- Release: 6 September – 22 November 2023

The Real Housewives of Warsaw (Polish: The Real Housewives. Żony Warszawy) is a Polish reality television series. Developed as an international installment of the Real Housewives franchise, it documents the personal and professional lives of several women residing in Warsaw.

The show aired on Polsat, and premiered on 6 September 2023. Due to low audience figures, the show was rescheduled and moved from Wednesday's prime time to late night time slot. The average viewership of all 12 episodes (during their first broadcast on Polsat) amounted to 265 thousand viewers (3.0% SHR).

In November 2023, Polsat announced that the show was cancelled due to "low viewership".

== Cast ==
=== Main ===
- Anita Kuś-Munsaje
- Magda Pyć-Leszczuk
- Barbara Sobczak
- Anna Szubierajska
- Monika Żochowska
- Sara Koślińska
- Kasia Przydryga
- Monika Goździalska

=== Recurring ===
- Anna Wrońska
