= The Real Housewives of Amsterdam =

Amsterdam-based reality television series in the Netherlands

- Genre: Reality television
- Presented by: Carlo Boszhard (s. 1–3); Nikkie de Jager (s. 4–)
- Starring: Sheila Bergeik; Hella Huizinga; Susanna Klibansky; Djamila Celina Melcherts; Kimmylien Nguyen; Cherry-Ann Person; Maria Tailor; Tamara Elbaz; Angela van den Brink; Deborah Luijendijk; Niama Amhali; Floor Coster; Lilian Dziedzic; Elvira Penthesilea; Renée Vervoorn
- Country of origin: Netherlands
- Original languages: Dutch; English
- No. of seasons: 4
- No. of episodes: 47

Production
- Executive producer: Sterre Heerink
- Producers: Roy Aalderink; Tiba Prins; Robyn van Bosstraten; Carlin Kooman; Dimitri Lischetzki
- Camera setup: Multiple
- Running time: 40-48 minutes
- Production company: Concept Street

Original release
- Network: Videoland
- Release: November 24, 2022 – present

Related
- The Real Housewives of South Netherlands; The Real Housewives of Rotterdam; The Real Housewives of Antwerp

The Real Housewives of Amsterdam, respectively abbreviated RHOAMS, is a Dutch reality television series that debuted on Videoland on November 24, 2022. Developed as the eighteenth international installment of The Real Housewives franchise, it documents the personal and professional lives of several women residing in Amsterdam, Netherlands. The programme also aired on Play in Belgium.

== Cast ==
=== Timeline of cast members ===
Main cast members
| Cast member | Seasons | | | | |
| Cast member | 1 | 2 | 3 | 4 | 5 |
|---|---|---|---|---|---|
| Sheila Bergeik | Main | | | | |
| Hella Huizinga | Main | Main | | Guest | |
| Susanna Klibansky | Main | Main | | | |
| Djamila Celina Melcherts | Main | Main | Main | Main | Main |
| Kimmylien Nguyen | Main | Main | Main | Main | Main |
| Cherry-Ann Person | Main | Main | Main | Main | |
| Maria Tailor | Main | Main | Main | | Main |
| Tamara Elbaz | | Main | Main | | Main |
| Angela van den Brink | Guest | Guest | Main | | |
| Deborah Luijendijk | | | Main | | Guest |
| Niama Amhali | | | Guest | Main | Main |
| Floor Coster | | | | Main | Main |
| Lilian Dziedzic | | | | Main | Main |
| Elvira Penthesilea | | | | Main | |
| Renée Vervoorn | | | | Main | Main |
Friends of the housewives
| Magali Gorré | Friend | Guest | | | |
| Antonia van Ruller | | Guest | | | Friend |

== Episodes ==
| Series | Episodes | Originally released | |
| Series | Episodes | First released | Last released |
|---|---|---|---|
| 1 | 9 | 24 November 2022 | 12 January 2023 |
| 2 | 13 | 26 October 2023 | 11 January 2024 |
| 3 | 13 | 28 November 2024 | 13 February 2025 |
| 4 | 12 | 28 November 2025 | 6 February 2026 |
| 5 | TBA | TBA | TBA |

=== Season 1 (2022–2023) ===
Maria Tailor, Hella Huizinga, Cherry-Ann Person, Kimmylien Nguyen, Sheila Bergeik, Susanna Klibansky and Djamila Celina Melcherts are introduced as series regulars. Magali Gorré served in a recurring capacity.

| No. overall | No. in season | Title | Original release date | Viewers (millions) |
|---|---|---|---|---|
| 1 | 1 | "Gossip Aan De Grachten" | November 24, 2022 | N/A |
We meet Maria, Djamila, Hella, Sheila, Cherry-Ann, Kimmylien and Susanna. Sheila invites all the ladies to a chic Amsterdam restaurant for her birthday. Susanna gives the hostess a present that leaves everyone stunned, Djamila causes consternation during dinner and an old argument between Maria and Kimmylien flares up.
| 2 | 2 | "Diva's En Drama's" | November 24, 2022 | N/A |
After many years of friendship between Kimmylien and Maria, the love has cooled, but the two ladies run into each other more and more often, including in this group. Susanna has a big event she's been working towards for a year. Djamila organizes a housewarming in the heart of Amsterdam, but not everyone is welcome. And even the men aren't safe from the drama between the Housewives.
| 3 | 3 | "De Toon Is Gezet" | December 1, 2022 | N/A |
Djamila is in the studio to record her new single 'Rich Girl'. Accompanied by Sheila and Susanna, they discover that Susanna has a musical talent. Maria opens up in an emotional conversation with her life coach and it finally becomes clear why Hella and Maria were not welcome at Djamila's housewarming. A sup adventure falls into the water when unrest arises between four of the ladies. Tensions run high during a 'Girls Night Out' at a beautiful location.
| 4 | 4 | "Vlam In De Pan" | December 8, 2022 | N/A |
The confrontation between the ladies at the table during the Girls Night Out is too much for Sheila and she feels alone in the group. The air between Maria, Hella and Djamila seems clear for now. Maria takes Sheila under her wing and goes golfing with her. Cherry-Ann and Djamila brief Magali on the drama during a shopping session. Susanna gives a glimpse into her life and takes Kimmylien, Sheila and their partners to an art fair. During an evening of Hotpotting, the flame hits the pan between the housewives and especially with friend Magali.
| 5 | 5 | "Met Zulke Vrienden Heb Je Geen Vijanden Nodig" | December 15, 2022 | N/A |
Sheila discusses the night before with her "two new best friends" Hella and Maria over an oyster. During the pre-tech, Cherry-Ann says that her temper has exploded and blames it on her pregnancy hormones. The workload took its toll on Hella and she discusses this in a conversation with her life coach. After a year of distance, Maria is back at Kimmylien's home for the first time for her son's birthday. Susanna organizes a private art lunch and tempers run high.
| 6 | 6 | "Schitteren Door Afwezigheid" | December 22, 2022 | N/A |
Cherry-Ann and Sheila face each other and try to bury the hatchet. Djamila shares an intense and personal experience about plastic surgery with Kimmylien and Cherry-Ann. Sheila and Maria undergo a v-steam treatment and Susanna takes up her love of singing. Kimmylien receives business advice from Roland Kahn and the very first TikTok release party is a fact, but not everyone shows up.
| 7 | 7 | "We're Going To Ibiza!" | December 29, 2022 | N/A |
The Housewives exchange Amsterdam for Ibiza. Susanna invites everyone for a barbecue in a beautiful villa, but that does not go without drama. Hella says she ended her relationship after 13 years. The group splits into two: Djamila and Kimmylien toast with champagne on the beach and the others relax during a yoga session. Cherry-Ann asks her mother about her relationship with Roland. The Ibiza trip ends with a luxurious boat trip and that is hard for Sheila.
| 8 | 8 | "Eind Goed, Al Goed?" | January 5, 2023 | N/A |
After the exciting Ibiza trip, the relationships between a number of Housewives are on edge. Djamila may perform during the event of the year in Amsterdam: the Gay Pride. But her act is not well received by everyone. During the big party in honor of the opening of Hella's new building, it turns out that the group is more divided than ever and that something is even brewing between Maria and Sheila.
| 9 | 9 | "De Reünie" | January 12, 2023 | N/A |
Hosted by Carlo Boszhard, the ladies of Amsterdam, Maria Tailor, Djamila Celina Melcherts, Cherry-Ann Person, Susanna Klibansky, Hella Huizinga, Kimmylien Nguyen and Sheila Bergeik get together to set the record straight on some of the most talked-about antics of the season and answer some of Holland's most burning questions. Magali also comes along with special evidence against Sheila.

=== Season 2 (2023–2024) ===
Bergeik departed as a series regular. Tamara Elbaz joined the cast.

| No. overall | No. in season | Title | Original release date | Viewers (millions) |
|---|---|---|---|---|
| 10 | 1 | "Nieuwe Ronde, Nieuwe Kansen" | October 26, 2023 | N/A |
| 11 | 2 | "De Kaarten Zijn Geschud" | October 26, 2023 | N/A |
| 12 | 3 | "Lunch Der Leugens" | November 2, 2023 | N/A |
| 13 | 4 | "La Noche Dramática" | November 9, 2023 | N/A |
| 14 | 5 | "Classy Or Trashy?" | November 16, 2023 | N/A |
| 15 | 6 | "Verwend Of Verwaarloosd" | November 23, 2023 | N/A |
| 16 | 7 | "Verbroken Vriendschap" | November 30, 2023 | N/A |
| 17 | 8 | "Sisterhood Of Sistershade?" | December 7, 2023 | N/A |
| 18 | 9 | "Het Is De Toon Die De Muziek Maakt" | December 14, 2023 | N/A |
| 19 | 10 | "Girls Trip Antwerpen!" | December 21, 2023 | N/A |
| 20 | 11 | "Spreken Is Zilver, Zwijgen Is Goud" | December 28, 2023 | N/A |
| 21 | 12 | "Vriendin Of Vijand?" | January 4, 2024 | N/A |
| 22 | 13 | "De Reünie" | January 11, 2024 | N/A |

=== Season 3 (2024–2025) ===
Klibansky and Huizinga departed as a series regular. Melcherts departed as a series regular after episode 9, but returend for the reunion. Angela van den Brink and Deborah Luijdendijk joined the cast.

| No. overall | No. in season | Title | Original release date | Viewers (millions) |
|---|---|---|---|---|
| 23 | 1 | "Nieuwe Gezichten, Oude Gewoontes" | November 28, 2024 | N/A |
| 24 | 2 | "Het Verleden, Heden En De Toekomst" | November 28, 2024 | N/A |
| 25 | 3 | "Oude Vriendschap Roest Niet" | December 5, 2024 | N/A |
| 26 | 4 | "Een Kleurrijke Ontgroeningsfase" | December 12, 2024 | N/A |
| 27 | 5 | "Self(ish) Love" | December 19, 2024 | N/A |
| 28 | 6 | "Alle Kaarten Op Tafel" | December 26, 2024 | N/A |
| 29 | 7 | "Het Roze Hazenpad Kiezen" | January 2, 2025 | N/A |
| 30 | 8 | "Samen Uit, Samen Niet Naar Huis" | January 9, 2025 | N/A |
| 31 | 9 | "De Handdoek In De Ring Gooien" | January 16, 2025 | N/A |
| 32 | 10 | "Het Is De Toon Die De Muziek Maakt" | January 23, 2025 | N/A |
| 33 | 11 | "Samen Sta Je Sterker Dan Alleen" | January 30, 2025 | N/A |
| 34 | 12 | "Heibel In De Hoofdstad" | February 6, 2025 | N/A |
| 35 | 13 | "De Reünie" | February 13, 2025 | N/A |

=== Season 4 (2025–2026) ===
However Melcherts departed last season, she rejoined this season. Tailor, Elbaz, Van den Brink and Luijdendijk departed as a series regular. Niama Amhali, Floor Coster, Lilian Dziedzic, Elvira Penthesilea and Renée Vervoorn joined the cast.

| No. overall | No. in season | Title | Original release date | Viewers (millions) |
|---|---|---|---|---|
| 36 | 1 | "Amsterdam Praat" | November 28, 2025 | N/A |
| 37 | 2 | "Vergeten, Maar Niet Vergeven" | November 28, 2025 | N/A |
| 38 | 3 | "Water En Vuur" | December 5, 2025 | N/A |
| 39 | 4 | "La Dolce Vita" | December 12, 2025 | N/A |
| 40 | 5 | "Hoge Hoogtes, Diepe Dalen" | December 19, 2025 | N/A |
| 41 | 6 | "Tijdelijke Time-out" | December 26, 2025 | N/A |
| 42 | 7 | "Zelfreflectie En Zelfliefde" | January 2, 2026 | N/A |
| 43 | 8 | "Zo Lek Als Een Mandje" | January 9, 2026 | N/A |
| 44 | 9 | "Een 'Fling' Uit Het Verleden" | January 16, 2026 | N/A |
| 45 | 10 | "Het Zinkende Schip" | January 23, 2026 | N/A |
| 46 | 11 | "De Reünie: Part 1" | January 30, 2026 | N/A |
| 47 | 12 | "De Reünie: Part 2" | February 6, 2026 | N/A |

=== Season 5 (2027) ===
Penthesilea and Person departed as a series regular. Elbaz and Tailor rejoined the cast as a series regular.

| No. overall | No. in season | Title | Original release date | Viewers (millions) |
|---|---|---|---|---|
| 48 | 1 | "TBA" | 2027 | TBD |
| 49 | 2 | "TBA" | 2027 | TBD |

== Production ==
The series premiered on November 24, 2022, and starred Sheila Bergeik, Hella Huizinga, Susanna Klibansky, Djamila Celina, Kimmylien Nguyen, Cherry-Ann Person and Maria Tailor.

Magali Gorré, previously a full time cast member on The Real Housewives of Cheshire, appears in a friend of role, making her the first real housewife to transfer franchises.

On June 1, 2023, a second season of the series was announced alongside the announcement of the main cast members. Sheila Bergeik, who had previously announced her departure, does not return in the second season while Hella Huizinga, Susanna Klibansky, Djamila Celina, Kimmylien Nguyen, Cherry-Ann Person and Maria Tailor returned in a full time capacity. Tamara Elbaz was revealed to join the cast as a main cast member in season 2. It was reported that Merel von Carlsburg and one other woman were filming for season 2 before choosing to quit early into the production process. Magali Gorré, who appeared in a friend of capacity in season 1, appears in a guest capacity in season 2. The second season premiered on October 26, 2023, with the first two episodes airing on Videoland. The first season was available on Hayu in March 2024. Djamila Celina Melcherts would also appear on The Real Housewives of Munich in a "Friend of" capacity to the cast.

Season 3 of the hit show premiered November 28, 2024 on Videoland with returning Cast members Djamila Celina Melcherts, Maria Tailor, Tamara Elbaz, Kimmylien Nguyen, Cherry-Ann Person joined by new wives Deborah Luijendijk & Angela van den Brink (who starred as a guest in the first 2 seasons). While filming for the third season, Melcherts quits midseason (Episode 9). She returned for the reunion and set the records straight, that she will not return for the fourth Season. Deborah Luijendijk, who joint in the third season is also not returning for season 4 as a Main castmember. She will be joining The Real Housewives of Rotterdam. The second season was available on Hayu in March 2025.

Season 4 started filming in May 2025. Van de Brink departed the series and Tailor, Elbaz & Luijendijk were put on hold by the producer, with Melcherts, Nguyen and Person returning. Niama Amhali joined the cast after she made a guest appearance in season three. Three other new full-time housewives have been cast alongside Amhali to replace the departures as part of a shake-up for the show. The cast was officially announced on October 28, 2025. The housewives for the fourth season will be: Niama Amhali, Floor Coster, Lilian Dziedzic, Renée Vervoorn and Elvira Penthesilea. Alongside Melcherts, Nguyen and Person. The fourth season will premiere on November 28, 2025 on Videoland and conclude on February 6, 2026. During the season finale host Nikkie de Jager announced season 5.

Marjan Strijbosch from The Real Housewives of South Netherlands made a guest appearance in the Post-credits scene from the season finale of season four to announce the start of season 2 of The Real Housewives of South Netherlands.

On 1 July 2026, in the midst of production for season 5, the full-time and returning cast was announced. Melcherts, Nguyen, Amhali, Coster, Dziedzic and Vervoorn return from the previous season, whilst OG housewife Person and one-season newbie Penthesilea will not be returning. It was also announced that Tailor & Elbaz would be returning full-time for season 5 after sitting out season 4. Season 5 is expected to premiere in late 2026.
