= List of The Real Housewives of Melbourne episodes =

The Real Housewives of Melbourne is an Australian reality television series that premiered on 23 February 2014 on Arena. It chronicles the lives of six women—Jackie Gillies, Janet Roach, Gamble Wolfe (née Breaux), Cherry Dipietrantonio, Kyla Kirkpatrick, and Simone Elliott—in and around Melbourne as they socialize, work on their careers and spend time with their families.

Former cast members featured over the previous seasons are: Andrea Moss (1), Chyka Keebaugh (1–3), Gina Liano (1–4), Lydia Schivello (1–4), Pettifleur Berenger (2–3), Susie McLean (3), Venus Behbahani-Clark (4), Sally Bloomfield (4), and Anjali Rao (5).

As of 12 December 2021, 59 original episodes of The Real Housewives of Melbourne have aired over five seasons.

== Series overview ==
Series	Episodes	Originally released	
Series	Episodes	First released	Last released
1	12	23 February 2014	11 May 2014
2	13	22 February 2015	17 May 2015
3	12	21 February 2016	15 May 2016
4	12	6 December 2017	21 February 2018
5	10	10 October 2021	12 December 2021

== Episodes ==
=== Season 1 (2014) ===
Jackie Gillies, Chyka Keebaugh, Gina Liano, Andrea Moss, Janet Roach, and Lydia Schiavello are introduced as series regulars.

No. overall	No. in series	Title	Original release date	Overnight Australian viewers
1	1	"First Impressions"	23 February 2014	117,000
Lydia meets up with Andrea and Gina. Janet has a psychic reading by fellow housewife Jackie. Janet invites Jackie to the Liberty Belle party hosted by Andrea. All 6 women to come together for the first time. Jackie throws a spanner in the works with her unnerving psychic predictions.
2	2	"Pick a Side"	2 March 2014	103,000
Jackie is quizzed for psychic vibes, Gina heads straight to the States leaving the other girls speculating why. Lydia invites Jackie to a local gallery and Chyka invites the wives to food tasting where Gina is the topic of conversation. Jackie and Gina have a confrontation in a cafe.
3	3	"New Kids on the Block"	9 March 2014	83,000
Janet visits Dr Chris Moss for some 'freshening' and Jackie attends as support. Lydia and her husband Andrew fly to King Island for a spot of cheese tasting. Gina's back from the States, after making a life altering decision about her partner. Jackie and Ben host a Mexican-themed housewarming party and Ben confronts Gina about her issues with his wife.
4	4	"Ice Queens"	16 March 2014	85,000
Lydia invites Jackie and Andrea away for skiing in Thredbo. Andrea and Lydia share their insights on money and relationships, Jackie bemused. Back in Melbourne, Chyka and Gina help Janet chose outfits for her date that night with a younger man. Unbeknownst to Janet, the girls stick around for a quick spy while the couple have dinner.
5	5	"Birthday Girl"	23 March 2014	72,000
Bruce manages to steal Chyka away for a romantic date night. Janet celebrates her birthday by picking up her sparkling three carat diamond ring.
6	6	"Anyone for Tennis?"	30 March 2014	92,000
Lydia's studying design at Andrea's alarmed at the slow building progress at the new Liberty Belle Skin and Janet's reworking her increasingly expensive renovations at Red Hill. Andrea hosts a tennis day at her beach house on the Mornington Peninsula. Jackie suggests a late night salsa lesson.
7	7	"Travelling North"	6 April 2014	83,000
Chyka invites everyone to the Elandra resort at Mission Beach, QLD. The breathtaking helicopter ride there provides a welcome distraction from the growing tension.
8	8	"No Show or Go Show?"	13 April 2014	108,000
The ladies return from Mission Beach with more baggage than they started out with and all somewhat stunned at the turn of events.
9	9	"Pooch Party"	20 April 2014	92,000
Gina enlists the help of a dating agency. Chyka asks Andrea, Lydia and Gina homewares shopping, which doesn't go to plan. Chyka hosts a pooch party for the girls and their pooches. Jackie and Ben show business mentor Chyka the labels on their new cocktail line. At an Emirates party Lydia questions Janet about something Gina said in a phone call. Janet meets Gina for a drink and things quickly turn sour.
10	10	"Here's to Happy Endings"	27 April 2014	85,000
Jackie and Ben audition burlesque dancer, Bella de Jac, for the La Mascara launch. Andrea shoots the cover of her book, The Working Mother's Revenge. Gina hosts a Girls Night In fundraising evening in aid of cancer research. Chyka encourages Gina and Andrea to meet.
11	11	"Reunion – Part 1"	4 May 2014	149,000
Alex Perry hosts this drama filled reunion, as the housewives come together to discuss the series, their relationships, and also the contents of that frequently talked about email.
12	12	"Reunion – Part 2"	11 May 2014	95,000
The housewives continue to discuss the highs and lows of the series, the accusations, the Chinese whispers and everyone's favourite pampered pooch, Figaro.

=== Season 2 (2015) ===
Moss departed as a series regular. Pettifleur Berenger and Gamble Breaux joined the cast.

No. overall	No. in series	Title	Original release date	Overnight Australian viewers
13	1	"Fresh Start, New Faces"	22 February 2015	120,000
Jackie, Lydia and Chyka meet up for lunch while Janet organises her birthday party. The housewives attend Janets' birthday party and we are introduced to two new housewives, Gamble Breaux and Pettifleur Berenger.
2	2	"Murder Mystery Party"	1 March 2015	96,000
Pettifleur wants to buy a Bentley. Gamble hires a dog trainer to train her dog, Cash. Gamble is hosting a murder mystery party and has invited all the housewives. Jackie, Janet and Pettifleur try on costumes at The Costume Shop for the party, where Janet gets aggravated about Pettifleur, who is being rude to the costume stylist Imogen Que. Gamble and Rick get engaged and announce it at her Murder Mystery Party. Janet, Chyka and Gamble meet up for lunch and Chyka brings up a conversation about rumours and Janet says that Gamble was a stripper and a call girl.
15	3	"Fashion Flare Up"	8 March 2015	81,000
Jackie promotes her cocktail brand, La Máscara. Jackie, Janet, Gina and Gamble attend the Chadstone fashion show. Gamble confronts Janet about the rumours she told Gamble earlier. Lydia learns to play poker with Shane Warne for a charity event.
16	4	"Anyone for Golf?"	15 March 2015	85,000
Gina and Janet catch up for coffee. Gina brings up the rumours and Janet walks out. Janet invites Gamble, Jackie, Chyka and Gina for golf. Jackie and Janet go look for outfits for golf and Janet brings up the lunch with Gina, which makes her cry. The girls go to the Mornington Peninsula to play golf. Jackie predicted that Gina would lose her golf stick, which she did, which shocks the housewives. Gamble and Janet call a truce.
17	5	"Chef's Dinner"	22 March 2015	104,000
Chyka, Jackie and Pettifleur go for lunch and Pettifleur calls Gamble stupid. Chyka invites everyone for a dinner. Lydia comes back from Italy, where her son gets married. While Lydia tells a heart-breaking story, Gamble starts laughing. Gamble confronts Pettifleur about calling her stupid. Gamble and Janet start arguing about the rumours yet again.
18	6	"Look Out Sydney"	29 March 2015	81,000
Everyone attends the AFL Grand Final, except Gina and Jackie. Gamble invites Gina, Janet and Pettifleur to Sydney. Lydia confronts Gamble about when she laughed at the dinner. The ladies go to Sydney and attend the Billich Art Gallery. Gamble's sister, Tempest confronts Janet about the rumours. Janet walks out of the Art Gallery and Gamble and Gina run out after her, trying to drag her back inside. Everyone goes for dinner and makes a pact that they don't bring up the rumours again. Gina has a few digs against Pettifleur, which Pettifleur thinks are racist remarks.
19	7	"Manila Bound"	5 April 2015	77,000
Chyka and Jackie look for a venue for Gambles hens party, where strippers greet them. Janet invites everyone to Manila. The ladies arrive at Manila, and get settled into their rooms. Chyka, Gamble and Gina go for lunch and talk about Pettifleur's controversial book, 'Switch the Bitch'. The housewives go for dinner and Gina and Pettifleur come to blows when Pettifleur's book comes up.
20	8	"Philippines Part 2"	12 April 2015	110,000
Pettifleur states that Gina is being racist against her, which leaves a bad taste in Gamble's mouth. Jackie states that Gina called Gamble's partner, Rick, a lunatic and that she was going to throw Gamble and Pettifleur under the bus. Jackie and Gina have an argument which escalates and turns into a screaming match. The housewives go for drinks at the hotel bar and Gamble and Pettifleur have a disagreement.
21	9	"Gina's New Shoes"	19 April 2015	107,000
Janet launches her tea range. Gamble and Janet's friend Carlos get into an argument about the rumours. Gina launches her new shoe range, with shoes named after each housewife. Janet and Pettifleur are upset that she named a shoe about them. Jackie has a party launching her La Máscara High-Tea.
22	10	"A Day at the Races"	26 April 2015	83,000
Gamble and Rick purchase an engagement ring. The housewives attend the Spring Racing Carnival. Pettifleur launches her controversial book, 'Switch the Bitch'. Gamble and Gina confront Pettifleur about the book again, where Jackie disagrees with what Gamble and Gina are saying. Gamble has her hens night. Jackie and Chyka organised strippers, which Gamble disapproves of. Gina says to Gamble that Gamble's make-up artist started about rumours. Janet and Gamble get into another argument about the rumours.
23	11	"Wonderland"	3 May 2015	84,000
Pettifleur asks Chyka to organise her birthday party. Chyka and her staff struggle to keep up with Pettifleur's high demands for the event. As the party kicks off, Janet, Manuela and Gamble argue about the rumours and Gina and Jackie go at it again, leaving guests in shock.
24	12	"Reunion – Part 1"	10 May 2015	97,000
The housewives reunite to talk about the highs and the lows of the second season. Gina and Gamble's close relationship gets brought up and when everyone brings up Pettifleur being drunk off-camera, it sends her into a rage and walks off the set.
25	13	"Reunion – Part 2"	17 May 2015	99,000
The housewives reunite to talk about the highs and the lows of the second season. Pettifleur calms down from the accusations flying her way. Gina's racist remarks against Pettifleur gets brought up and when Manuela joins the couch, Gamble, Janet and Manuela argue about the rumours.

=== Season 3 (2016) ===
Susie McLean joined the cast.

No. overall	No. in series	Title	Original release date	Overnight Australian viewers
26	1	"Join The Club"	21 February 2016	133,000
All the women are back, but new girl, Susie, wonders what planet she's landed on after inviting them over for a day of baking, but a full on brawl ensues.
27	2	"Old Sparks, New Starts"	28 February 2016	122,000
Janet has dinner with her ex husband; Gamble promotes her dress designer to wedding planner; Lydia becomes the topic of conversation when the women go horse riding.
28	3	"By Invitation Only"	6 March 2016	86,000
Gamble hosts a cocktail party where she plans to issue the wedding invitations but simmering tensions surface before all hell breaks loose.
29	4	"Here Comes the Brides"	13 March 2016	95,000
Chyka throws Gamble a bridal shower with a twist thanks to the strict dress code: wedding dress only. Turns out wearing your old frock can be an emotional trigger.
30	5	"Gamble's Big Day"	20 March 2016	145,000
The ladies head to Byron for Gamble's wedding. But with wild weather threatening the beach ceremony and everyone at logger heads, it's not exactly the smoothest of wedding days.
31	6	"Bye Bye Byron"	27 March 2016	125,000
Gina's early departure the night before the wedding turns the wives into reception detectives. Once back in Melbourne family's the focus with bitter sweet life lessons to confront.
32	7	"Portrait Of Figaro"	3 April 2016	106,000
Chyka hosts a glamorous middle eastern dinner to extend an exciting invitation to the ladies but the thrill is somewhat dampened when Pettifleur and Jackie start sparring.
33	8	"Do Buy"	10 April 2016	117,000
The housewives arrive in lavish, resplendent Dubai. But not even the world's largest shopping mall can curtail their bickering which is fuelled to boiling point by scorching desert temps.
34	9	"Desert Storm"	17 April 2016	137,000
After an impassioned dinner in the Dubai desert that frightens the camels, the wives recover over retail therapy in the souks before heading off to another explosive group dinner.
35	10	"Gossip Girl"	24 April 2016	127,000
As Dubai recovers from the high drama that accompanied the housewives on their trip, the women return to normality back home with family. But it's a normal only they understand.
36	11	"Waterfront"	1 May 2016	162,000
Lydia's mum celebrates her 69th birthday, Gina launches her perfume line and the ladies all get together for a final dramatic dinner come showdown at the Waterfront Restaurant.
37	12	"Reunion"	15 May 2016	132,000
After the most explosive season ever, temperatures soar as the ladies reunite for a fiery reunion. The Housewives air their grievances with tears, tantrums and plenty of allegations. Hosted by Alex Perry.

=== Season 4 (2017–18) ===
Keebaugh, Berenger and McLean departed as series regulars. Venus Behbahani-Clark and Sally Bloomfield joined the cast.

No. overall	No. in series	Title	Original release date	Overnight Australian viewers
38	1	"Venus Rising"	6 December 2017	98,000
Gina and Lydia’s friendship has come full circle, with the two growing closer than ever. While Gina is grateful for Lydia’s support throughout a difficult time, it seems the same can’t be said for Gamble, who finds herself increasingly on the outs. Gina hosts a dinner for all the girls, except for Gamble, which prompts Jackie to question if Gina is replacing Gamble with new girl Venus. At dinner, Lydia confronts Jackie about their unresolved issues, and Gina is shocked when a mysterious gift arrives at the table.
39	2	"House of Lords"	13 December 2017	95,000
We are introduced to new girl Sally, a friend and associate of Janet's. Lydia shares her new cooking class concept with her husband Andrew, and Janet hosts a party at her new man's mansion with all the girls in attendance. It doesn't take long for tensions arise with Gamble's arrival, both confronting Gina and creating an awkward situation for Venus and her husband.
40	3	"Midsummer Madness"	20 December 2017	81,000
Venus and James are still smarting from Gamble's mockery of their 'lord and lady' titles despite Gina and Lydia's advice to let it go. Chyka invites Janet, Jackie and Sally to her huge country cottage to catch up on the girls' latest antics. Gamble hosts her stepson Luke's 21st fairy themed party where it is revealed that Venus allegedly has some compromising photographs of the girls on her phone.
41	4	"Dishing The Dirt"	27 December 2017	55,000
Sally and Gamble get together over lunch to discuss the mystery surrounding Venus and the photos. Venus advises her younger sister Rebecca that it’s time to tell their father that her wedding is off. Lydia organises a day of truffle hunting in the country, giving Sally the chance to confront Venus about the photos. Meanwhile Janet, Jackie and Gamble chopper off to Levantine Hill Vineyard. The three are determined to get to the bottom of the mystery surrounding Venus, and with Janet’s latest intel, things are set to get interesting.
42	5	"Sally Can't Wait"	3 January 2018	94,000
Sally invites the girls to celebrate the launch of her accessories line, but things go a little pear shaped when Gamble and Venus lock horns and Lydia stirs things up with Jackie and Janet.
43	6	"It’s My Party I’ll Invite Who I Want To"	10 January 2018	98,000
Venus, Lydia and Gina catch up but it’s the ongoing feud between Lydia and Jackie that dominates the conversation. Unsurprisingly, Jackie has a very different take on things to Lydia and she heads over to Chyka’s place for a chat. After successfully launching her accessories range Sally is now preparing to open her hotel in Bali. When Gamble shares her suspicions that their new house is haunted with Rick and Luke, the boys aren’t so sure. Then, the girls celebrate Jackie’s 37th birthday in style, with the notable exception of Lydia. Jackie takes everyone by surprise by inviting them on an overseas trip, motivating Venus to patch things up with Gamble.
44	7	"Tequila Sunrise"	17 January 2018	93,000
The housewives arrive in beautiful Cabo San Lucas, Mexico, ready to kick up their heels and have some fun, but while six of them are sipping cocktails, Venus is back in Melbourne desperately searching for her misplaced passport. Gina, Lydia and Sally decide to ease into holiday mode and stay by the pool. Feeling adventurous, Jackie, Gamble and Janet go in search of Cabo's best taco. In the evening, the ladies head out for a lovely dinner, but the party atmosphere sours quickly when Jackie confronts Lydia over the so-called rift between her and Janet. All the arguing overshadows Venus' arrival and Gina's treatment of Gamble prompts a clash with Sally, leading to Gina storming out of the dinner in a huff.
45	8	"Tequila Sunset"	24 January 2018	109,000
The housewives set sail for some fun in the sun on a catamaran off Cabo’s coast but beneath the calm waters a storm is brewing between Gina and Sally. At dinner that night, the girls put their differences aside and open up about past relationships, sharing the lessons they’ve learnt through heartache. But the love swiftly evaporates when Gina and Sally go head to head, with accusations of racism and bullying being thrown around.
46	9	"Getting into the Spirit"	31 January 2018	85,000
Jackie takes to the stage for her debut Shine It Up show in front of 300 eager fans. Venus holds a make-up masterclass showcasing her new contouring cosmetics, and reveals her true self. In an effort to bid farewell to the ghosts currently haunting her house, Gamble invites the girls to a seance.
47	10	"Happy Birthday Baby"	7 February 2018	85,000
Venus plans the ultimate fourth birthday party for her youngest daughter, Sophia. Jackie is the proud recipient of a great honour in her hometown of Newcastle. A nervous Gamble rehearses her surprise song for Rick, and Sally drops by for moral support. Sophia’s party enchants even the most hardened housewives, but Gamble’s attempt to compliment Venus backfires in her face.
48	11	"The Great Divide"	14 February 2018	98,000
Gamble brings Rick to tears with her anniversary gift. Later, Lydia hosts a dinner for the girls and the night descends into chaos after Lydia attempts to say a few words about each of the girls. Sally and Gina have another war of words over their blow up in Mexico.
49	12	"Reunion"	21 February 2018	73,000
The housewives come together with Alex Perry for the most explosive reunion yet. With bullying and body image on the agenda there are sure to be a few bombshells dropped.

=== Season 5 (2021) ===
Liano, Schiavello, Behbahani-Clark and Bloomfield departed as series regulars. Cherry Dipietrantonio, Simone Elliott, Kyla Kirkpatrick and Anjali Rao joined the cast. Rao departed as a series regular after episode 7.

No. overall	No. in series	Title	Original release date	Overnight Australian viewers
50	1	"Episode 1"	10 October 2021	41,000
Jackie, Janet, and Gamble reunite. A lunch at Janet’s house introduces Cherry and Kyla to the group. Jackie shares her emotional journey to fall pregnant. On at a trip to a day spa, the ladies meet Simone, a new friend of Jackie's. However, a tense exchange between Janet and Kyla gets heated.
51	2	"Episode 2"	17 October 2021	37,000
Tensions between Janet and Kyla are put aside, as Jackie confides in the group about her recent miscarriage. Gamble begins work on a new project, an exhibition of her late artist father's works. Jackie shares a life-changing secret with husband Ben. Kyla hosts a Champagne Masterclass, inviting friend Anjali along for support. But it's a drinking game at the Masterclass that soon turns sour, when Gamble accuses Anjali of spreading fake news.
52	3	"Episode 3"	24 October 2021	40,000
Anjali and Gamble smooth things over after their recent clash, when they bond over a shared experience of losing their fathers. Cherry invites Janet and Kyla shopping in the hope the two can resolve their differences. Meanwhile, following their recent miscarriage, Jackie and Ben attend a scan, before Jackie pulls best friend Janet aside for some emotional news. Anjali throws a pool party where Simone opens up to the group about her recent heartbreak, and Jackie finally reveals her life-changing news with the rest of the ladies.
53	4	"Episode 4"	31 October 2021	N/A
The housewives are settling into a newly-pregnant Jackie’s North Queensland ‘babymoon’ when Simone accuses Cherry of trying to steal her designer, and rumours abound Kyla’s not being honest about her past.
54	5	"Episode 5"	7 November 2021	N/A
Jackie’s well-being inspired ‘babymoon’ has yet to bring calm. Simone and Cherry’s squabble over a fashion designer continues and back in Melbourne the storm clouds part briefly, before another conflict kicks off.
55	6	"Episode 6"	14 November 2021	N/A
With the launch of her exhibition, Gamble fulfils a lifelong ambition to celebrate her late father's art, but where is Anjali? A naked man whose modesty is protected only by a stuffed bunny rabbit, provides a 'small' distraction. Miraculously, Janet and Kyla seem to be bonding at last, but the jury's out how long it will last. Meanwhile, Anjali's absence is still ruffling feathers, and tempers flare when Gamble reveals the ex-CNN anchor's been accusing the ladies of fake news. An old friend is back to help organise Jackie's baby shower and plans are afoot to reveal the gender of the twins. And after a romantic night out in the city and a successful charity event, Cherry is on a high, but with Anjali's dramas escalating tensions within the group; the mood soon comes back down to earth with a crash.
56	7	"Episode 7"	21 November 2021	42,000
A shocking rumour about Janet resurfaces, before Anjali makes a bombshell revelation of her own. Jackie’s baby shower goes off with a bang as the gender of her twins is finally revealed by a double cannon fire.
57	8	"Episode 8"	28 November 2021	33,000
Despite one glaring absence, the girls head out of town with high hopes for a tension-free weekend until a persistent rumour about Janet threatens the peace and one housewife makes another cataclysmic exit.
58	9	"Episode 9"	5 December 2021	N/A
59	10	"Episode 10"	12 December 2021	45,000

=== Season 6 2026 ===
Roach, Kirkpatrick, and Elliot departed as series regular. Liano rejoined the cast as series regular. Berenger served in a recurring capacity.
