= The Real Housewives of Melbourne season 5 =

The Real Housewives of Melbourne
- Season 5
- Starring: Jackie Gillies; Janet Roach; Gamble Breaux; Anjali Rao; Cherry Dipietrantonio; Kyla Kirkpatrick; Simone Elliott
- No. of episodes: 10

Release
- Original network: FOX Arena
- Original release: 10 October – 12 December 2021

Season chronology
- ← Previous; Season 4

The fifth season of The Real Housewives of Melbourne, an Australian reality television series, was broadcast on FOX Arena. It aired from 10 October 2021, until 12 December 2021 and was primarily filmed in Melbourne, Victoria. Executive Producers are Pip Rubira and Dan Munday, along with consulting Executive Producer Lisa Potasz for Matchbox Pictures, part of NBCUniversal International Studios, in conjunction with Foxtel.

The Real Housewives of Melbourne focuses on the lives of Jackie Gillies, Janet Roach, Gamble Breaux, Anjali Rao, Cherry Dipietrantonio, Kyla Kirkpatrick, and Simone Elliott; it consisted of ten episodes.

== Production and crew ==
Foxtel renewed The Real Housewives of Melbourne for a fifth season in September 2019, with the season set to premiere in 2020. Foxtel Executive Director of Television Brian Walsh confirmed casting discussions had commenced for the upcoming fifth season and would include "a big cast shake up."

Production on the fifth season was confirmed for July 2020, but was later pushed to January 2021, due to delays caused by the COVID-19 pandemic. In a statement released by Foxtel and Matchbox Pictures, “The Health and Safety of our cast and crew is our top priority.” Filming for the season concluded in July 2021.

An all cast reunion was not filmed for the fifth season, marking the first time in the series history to not feature a reunion.

== Cast and synopsis ==
On 19 February 2020, Foxtel announced the cast for the fifth season, confirming the return of Gamble Breaux, Gina Liano, Janet Roach and Lydia Schiavello, as well as the addition of newcomers Anjali Rao, Kyla Kirkpatrick and Cherry Dipietrantonio. Sally Bloomfield, Jackie Gillies and Venus Behbahani-Clark departed the cast.

The following year, Foxtel confirmed the cast for a second time in April 2021, with Roach and Breaux returning, as well as the previously announced additions of Rao, Kirkpatrick, and Dipietrantonio. Gillies, who had previously departed, was announced as returning to the series, along with new addition Simone Elliott. Liano and Schiavello, who were previously set to return, confirmed their departures from the series.

Liano confirmed in September 2021, she left the series to focus on her career as a barrister, stating "When season five got cancelled last year I threw myself into my career and when they spoke to me about the new series I thought, I can't take six months off my practice, it's just too destructive". In the same interview, Liano revealed she almost departed the series after the first season, however Real Housewives of Beverly Hills cast member Lisa Vanderpump convinced her to return.

Following the conclusion of the season's seventh episode, Rao departed the series after one season.

== Taglines ==
- Janet: "I don't like trouble unless I've caused it."
- Jackie: "Watch out world because I'm shining brighter than ever."
- Cherry: "Life is a journey, not a competition."
- Kyla: "Diamonds aren't a girl's best friend, champagne is."
- Gamble: "I'm no fool, but I don't mind acting like one."
- Anjali: "Fake news I can handle, fake people? Not in this life."
- Simone: "Keep your standards high and your stilettos higher."

== Episodes ==
No. overall	No. in series	Title	Original release date	Overnight Australian viewers
50	1	"Episode 1"	10 October 2021	41,000
Jackie, Janet, and Gamble reunite. A lunch at Janet’s house introduces Cherry and Kyla to the group. Jackie shares her emotional journey to fall pregnant. On at a trip to a day spa, the ladies meet Simone, a new friend of Jackie's. However, a tense exchange between Janet and Kyla gets heated.
51	2	"Episode 2"	17 October 2021	37,000
Tensions between Janet and Kyla are put aside, as Jackie confides in the group about her recent miscarriage. Gamble begins work on a new project, an exhibition of her late artist father's works. Jackie shares a life-changing secret with husband Ben. Kyla hosts a Champagne Masterclass, inviting friend Anjali along for support. But it's a drinking game at the Masterclass that soon turns sour, when Gamble accuses Anjali of spreading fake news.
52	3	"Episode 3"	24 October 2021	40,000
Anjali and Gamble smooth things over after their recent clash, when they bond over a shared experience of losing their fathers. Cherry invites Janet and Kyla shopping in the hope the two can resolve their differences. Meanwhile, following their recent miscarriage, Jackie and Ben attend a scan, before Jackie pulls best friend Janet aside for some emotional news. Anjali throws a pool party where Simone opens up to the group about her recent heartbreak, and Jackie finally reveals her life-changing news with the rest of the ladies.
53	4	"Episode 4"	31 October 2021	N/A
The housewives are settling into a newly-pregnant Jackie’s North Queensland ‘babymoon’ when Simone accuses Cherry of trying to steal her designer, and rumours abound Kyla’s not being honest about her past.
54	5	"Episode 5"	7 November 2021	N/A
Jackie’s well-being inspired ‘babymoon’ has yet to bring calm. Simone and Cherry’s squabble over a fashion designer continues and back in Melbourne the storm clouds part briefly, before another conflict kicks off.
55	6	"Episode 6"	14 November 2021	N/A
With the launch of her exhibition, Gamble fulfils a lifelong ambition to celebrate her late father's art, but where is Anjali? A naked man whose modesty is protected only by a stuffed bunny rabbit, provides a 'small' distraction. Miraculously, Janet and Kyla seem to be bonding at last, but the jury's out how long it will last. Meanwhile, Anjali's absence is still ruffling feathers, and tempers flare when Gamble reveals the ex-CNN anchor's been accusing the ladies of fake news. An old friend is back to help organise Jackie's baby shower and plans are afoot to reveal the gender of the twins. And after a romantic night out in the city and a successful charity event, Cherry is on a high, but with Anjali's dramas escalating tensions within the group; the mood soon comes back down to earth with a crash.
56	7	"Episode 7"	21 November 2021	42,000
A shocking rumour about Janet resurfaces, before Anjali makes a bombshell revelation of her own. Jackie’s baby shower goes off with a bang as the gender of her twins is finally revealed by a double cannon fire.
57	8	"Episode 8"	28 November 2021	33,000
Despite one glaring absence, the girls head out of town with high hopes for a tension-free weekend until a persistent rumour about Janet threatens the peace and one housewife makes another cataclysmic exit.
58	9	"Episode 9"	5 December 2021	N/A
59	10	"Episode 10"	12 December 2021	45,000

== Broadcast ==
Season five of The Real Housewives of Melbourne premiered on 10 October 2021, with episodes airing weekly, Sundays at 8:30pm AEST on FOX Arena. Episodes will also be available on demand via Foxtel Now and Binge. This is the first season of the Foxtel Original series to broadcast on FOX Arena, since the channels rebrand from Arena on 1 July 2020.

In November 2021, Foxtel Executive Director of Television Brian Walsh commented “The number one most-viewed show on Binge for the last three weeks has been The Real Housewives of Melbourne. Beating The Walking Dead, beating Succession.”

== Reception ==
=== Awards ===
In October 2021, The Real Housewives of Melbourne season five was nominated for Best Reality Series in the eleventh Australian Academy of Cinema and Television Arts Awards.
