= The Real Housewives of Melbourne season 2 =

The Real Housewives of Melbourne
- Season 2
- Promotional poster (Left to right) Breaux, Gillies, Schiavello, Liano, Keebaugh, Roach, and Berenger
- Starring: Jackie Gillies; Chyka Keebaugh; Gina Liano; Janet Roach; Lydia Schiavello; Pettifleur Berenger; Gamble Breaux
- No. of episodes: 13

Release
- Original network: Arena
- Original release: 22 February – 17 May 2015

Season chronology
- ← Previous; Season 1 Next → Season 3

The second season of The Real Housewives of Melbourne, an Australian reality television series, was broadcast on Arena. It aired from 22 February 2015, until 17 May 2015, and was primarily filmed in Melbourne, Victoria. Its executive producers are Kylie Washington and Lisa Potasz.

The Real Housewives of Melbourne focuses on the lives of Jackie Gillies, Chyka Keebaugh, Gina Liano, Janet Roach, Lydia Schiavello, Pettifleur Berenger, and Gamble Breaux; It consisted of thirteen episodes.

== Production and crew ==
Season two of The Real Housewives of Melbourne was officially commissioned 8 May 2014, prior to the conclusion of season 1. Filming for the season had begun by August 2014. On 7 December 2014, the full cast and premiere date were announced. A trailer depicting the returning wives picking up the new wives from an airport was released on 2 February 2015. The trailer featured a cover of These Boots Are Made for Walkin' by Australian artist Marcia Hines, recorded specifically for the trailer.

The series premiere "Fresh Start, New Faces" was aired on 22 February 2015, while the eleventh episode "Wonderland" served as the season finale, and was aired on 3 May 2015. It was followed by a two-part reunion which marked the conclusion of the season and was broadcast on 10 May and 17 May 2015.

Kylie Washington and Lisa Potasz are recognized as the series' executive producers, and Euan Jones, Virginia Hodgson, Philippa Rubira are recognized as series' producers. It is produced by Matchbox Pictures, and distributed by NBCUniversal International Television Production.

== Cast and synopsis ==
Five of the six housewives featured on the first season returned for the second installment. Prior to the conclusion of season one, cast member Andrea Moss expressed doubts in return for the second installment as she was taken aback by how publicised they had become saying, "It’s not what I expected. There’s a lot more attention on us. It’s a whole lot bigger than I ever thought (it would be)." Upon announcing the new season, Brian Walsh, Foxtel executive director of television, announced the departure of Moss revealing it was her decision to leave the show. Walsh spoke on behalf of production in wish Moss well and that they understand her decisions in leaving the show.

With the departure of Moss, The Real Housewives of Melbourne saw the introduction of two new full-time wives, Pettifleur Berenger and Gamble Breaux.

Breaux is a former art consultant, who now follows her passion of painting, is described as someone who marches to the beat of her woman drum as well as being quirky and entertaining. The former model is originally from Sydney, but now lives in Melbourne with her husband Dr. Richard Wolfe, one of Australia's respected cataract and laser refractive eye surgeons, along with her step-son, in their Mornington Peninsula home. In Sydney, Breaux worked as an art consultant for many places, which includes the Billich Gallery that is owned by Charles Billich. Now in Melbourne, Breaux spends her timing going for jogs, getting botox, designing her handbag range, and spoiling her Pomeranians, Cash and Wicket.

Berenger is a Sri Lankan-born property developer who is an aspiring author of her first book, Switch the Bitch. Berenger is described as determined, feisty and glamorous as well as somebody who lives the high life in more ways than one. Born in Sri Lanka, Berenger moved to Australia in her teenage years and settled in Melbourne. She describes herself as having Swiss, Portuguese, Dutch and Ceylonese ancestry. Since migrating to Australia, Berenger has gone on to work as property manager and runs her own property management business. She has been married twice and has three sons whose ages range between twelve and thirteen, and has been dating for eight years a man called Frank, whom she regards as her rock, soul mate and travelling companion.

Also featured in season two is recurring cast member, Manuela Pless-Bennett. Pless-Bennet is the first "friend of the housewives" to be featured in The Real Housewives of Melbourne and was featured in interviews and attended the reunion. Pless-Bennet is a Melbourne native who is described as someone with a sharp, creative, entrepreneurial mind, as well as a person who makes success of everything she puts her hand to. Pless-Bennet was educated in Melbourne as well as Switzerland and Los Angeles, which led to her shaping her career to be an international model that lasted for over a decades as well as working in several countries. Pless-Bennet moved to Los Angeles, where she stopped modelling and dedicated her time to journalism, which she studied at UCLA, and working towards her college credit as an intern on the Paramount Pictures lot at Entertainment Tonight, as well as the Los Angeles headquarters for channel 7 and channel 9. After college, Pless-Bennet pursued her passion of journalism which led to many jobs that included radio, live shows and television. Pless-Bennet landed her dream job at the time, hosting a prime-time television show which led her moving back to Australia. Away from journalism, Pless-Bennet has a passion for property, having sold, bought, renovated, and built many homes across Australia.

== Taglines ==
- Chyka: "Style is an attitude, not something you can buy."
- Gamble: "Gamble on me and you’re sure to win."
- Gina: "I deal in fact not friction."
- Jackie: "Make light of me all you want, but I’m still going to shine!"
- Janet: "Some people have ups and downs- I have roller coaster rides!"
- Lydia: "I love tradition but I’m no traditional housewife."
- Pettifleur: "This little flower is no shrinking violet!"

== Episodes ==
No. overall	No. in series	Title	Original release date	Overnight Australian viewers
13	1	"Fresh Start, New Faces"	22 February 2015	120,000
Jackie, Lydia and Chyka meet up for lunch while Janet organises her birthday party. The housewives attend Janets' birthday party and we are introduced to two new housewives, Gamble Breaux and Pettifleur Berenger.
2	2	"Murder Mystery Party"	1 March 2015	96,000
Pettifleur wants to buy a Bentley. Gamble hires a dog trainer to train her dog, Cash. Gamble is hosting a murder mystery party and has invited all the housewives. Jackie, Janet and Pettifleur try on costumes at The Costume Shop for the party, where Janet gets aggravated about Pettifleur, who is being rude to the costume stylist Imogen Que. Gamble and Rick get engaged and announce it at her Murder Mystery Party. Janet, Chyka and Gamble meet up for lunch and Chyka brings up a conversation about rumours and Janet says that Gamble was a stripper and a call girl.
15	3	"Fashion Flare Up"	8 March 2015	81,000
Jackie promotes her cocktail brand, La Máscara. Jackie, Janet, Gina and Gamble attend the Chadstone fashion show. Gamble confronts Janet about the rumours she told Gamble earlier. Lydia learns to play poker with Shane Warne for a charity event.
16	4	"Anyone for Golf?"	15 March 2015	85,000
Gina and Janet catch up for coffee. Gina brings up the rumours and Janet walks out. Janet invites Gamble, Jackie, Chyka and Gina for golf. Jackie and Janet go look for outfits for golf and Janet brings up the lunch with Gina, which makes her cry. The girls go to the Mornington Peninsula to play golf. Jackie predicted that Gina would lose her golf stick, which she did, which shocks the housewives. Gamble and Janet call a truce.
17	5	"Chef's Dinner"	22 March 2015	104,000
Chyka, Jackie and Pettifleur go for lunch and Pettifleur calls Gamble stupid. Chyka invites everyone for a dinner. Lydia comes back from Italy, where her son gets married. While Lydia tells a heart-breaking story, Gamble starts laughing. Gamble confronts Pettifleur about calling her stupid. Gamble and Janet start arguing about the rumours yet again.
18	6	"Look Out Sydney"	29 March 2015	81,000
Everyone attends the AFL Grand Final, except Gina and Jackie. Gamble invites Gina, Janet and Pettifleur to Sydney. Lydia confronts Gamble about when she laughed at the dinner. The ladies go to Sydney and attend the Billich Art Gallery. Gamble's sister, Tempest confronts Janet about the rumours. Janet walks out of the Art Gallery and Gamble and Gina run out after her, trying to drag her back inside. Everyone goes for dinner and makes a pact that they don't bring up the rumours again. Gina has a few digs against Pettifleur, which Pettifleur thinks are racist remarks.
19	7	"Manila Bound"	5 April 2015	77,000
Chyka and Jackie look for a venue for Gambles hens party, where strippers greet them. Janet invites everyone to Manila. The ladies arrive at Manila, and get settled into their rooms. Chyka, Gamble and Gina go for lunch and talk about Pettifleur's controversial book, 'Switch the Bitch'. The housewives go for dinner and Gina and Pettifleur come to blows when Pettifleur's book comes up.
20	8	"Philippines Part 2"	12 April 2015	110,000
Pettifleur states that Gina is being racist against her, which leaves a bad taste in Gamble's mouth. Jackie states that Gina called Gamble's partner, Rick, a lunatic and that she was going to throw Gamble and Pettifleur under the bus. Jackie and Gina have an argument which escalates and turns into a screaming match. The housewives go for drinks at the hotel bar and Gamble and Pettifleur have a disagreement.
21	9	"Gina's New Shoes"	19 April 2015	107,000
Janet launches her tea range. Gamble and Janet's friend Carlos get into an argument about the rumours. Gina launches her new shoe range, with shoes named after each housewife. Janet and Pettifleur are upset that she named a shoe about them. Jackie has a party launching her La Máscara High-Tea.
22	10	"A Day at the Races"	26 April 2015	83,000
Gamble and Rick purchase an engagement ring. The housewives attend the Spring Racing Carnival. Pettifleur launches her controversial book, 'Switch the Bitch'. Gamble and Gina confront Pettifleur about the book again, where Jackie disagrees with what Gamble and Gina are saying. Gamble has her hens night. Jackie and Chyka organised strippers, which Gamble disapproves of. Gina says to Gamble that Gamble's make-up artist started about rumours. Janet and Gamble get into another argument about the rumours.
23	11	"Wonderland"	3 May 2015	84,000
Pettifleur asks Chyka to organise her birthday party. Chyka and her staff struggle to keep up with Pettifleur's high demands for the event. As the party kicks off, Janet, Manuela and Gamble argue about the rumours and Gina and Jackie go at it again, leaving guests in shock.
24	12	"Reunion – Part 1"	10 May 2015	97,000
The housewives reunite to talk about the highs and the lows of the second season. Gina and Gamble's close relationship gets brought up and when everyone brings up Pettifleur being drunk off-camera, it sends her into a rage and walks off the set.
25	13	"Reunion – Part 2"	17 May 2015	99,000
The housewives reunite to talk about the highs and the lows of the second season. Pettifleur calms down from the accusations flying her way. Gina's racist remarks against Pettifleur gets brought up and when Manuela joins the couch, Gamble, Janet and Manuela argue about the rumours.

== Home media release ==
The second season was released on DVD in region 4 on 16 November 2015.

== Reception ==
=== U.S. ratings ===
The Real Housewives of Melbourne returned to Bravo for its second season on 5 March 2015, this time being upgraded to a prime-time time slot on, compared to its first season being airing during noon on Sundays. Season two of the series aired in the U.S. just two week after its Australian premiere. The second-season premiere, grew on the prior season's premiere attracting 534,000 viewers, whereas season one premiered attracted an approximately 414,000 total viewers.

The Real Housewives of Melbourne, season 2 ratings
No.	Episode	Air date	Time slot (EST)	Rating/Share (18–49)	Total viewers
1	Fresh Start, New Faces	5 March 2015	Sunday; 09:00 p.m.	0.20	534,000
2	Murder Mystery Party	12 March 2015	Sunday; 09:00 p.m.	0.20	458,000
3	Fashion Flare Up	19 March 2015	Sunday; 09:00 p.m.	0.16	411,000
4	Anyone for Golf?	26 March 2015	Sunday; 09:00 p.m.	0.17	399,000
5	Chef's Dinner	2 April 2015	Sunday 10:00 p.m.	0.10	312,000
6	Look Out Sydney	9 April 2015	Sunday; 09:00 p.m.	0.16	433,000
7	Manila Bound	16 April 2015	Sunday; 09:00 p.m.	0.17	423,000
8	Philippines Part 2	23 April 2015	Sunday; 09:00 p.m.	0.15	315,000
9	Gina's New Shoes	30 April 2015	Sunday; 09:00 p.m.	0.13	373,000
10	A Day at the Races	7 May 2015	Sunday; 09:00 p.m.	0.12	345,000
11	Wonderland	14 May 2015	Sunday; 09:00 p.m.	0.18	414,000
12	Reunion – Part 1	21 May 2015	Sunday; 09:00 p.m.	0.18	445,000
13	Reunion – Part 2	28 May 2015	Sunday; 09:00 p.m.	0.10	346,000

=== Awards ===
In 2015, The Real Housewives of Melbourne season two was nominated for Best Reality Television Series in the fifth Australian Academy of Cinema and Television Arts Awards, however the series was beaten by MasterChef Australia.
