= The Real Housewives of Melbourne season 3 =

The Real Housewives of Melbourne
- Season 3
- Promotional poster (Left to right) McLean, Gillies, Breaux, Roach, Liano, Berenger, Schiavello, and Keebaugh
- Starring: Jackie Gillies; Chyka Keebaugh; Gina Liano; Janet Roach; Lydia Schiavello; Pettifleur Berenger; Gamble Breaux; Susie McLean
- No. of episodes: 12

Release
- Original network: Arena
- Original release: 21 February – 15 May 2016

Season chronology
- ← Previous; Season 2 Next → Season 4

The third season of The Real Housewives of Melbourne, an Australian reality television series, was broadcast on Arena. It aired from 21 February 2016, until 15 May 2016, and was primarily filmed in Melbourne, Victoria. Its executive producers are Kylie Washington and Lisa Potasz.

The Real Housewives of Melbourne focuses on the lives of Jackie Gillies, Chyka Keebaugh, Gina Liano, Janet Roach, Lydia Schiavello, Pettifleur Berenger, Gamble Breaux, and Susie McLean; It consisted of twelve episodes.

== Production and crew ==
It was announced on 7 June 2015 that the series would returning for its third installment with cast member Gina Liano announcing her return and that filming for the season would begin in July 2015. On September 11, 2015, the cast of season three was announced as well as an order of a total of ten episodes, and on 22 December 2016 the premiere date was announced along with an increased episode order now with a total of eleven episodes. On February 6, 2016, Arena released an official trailer featuring footage of season three. Prior to the conclusion of the season, on 24 March 2016, it was announced the season would feature a reunion special. The reunion special was filmed on 3 April 2016.

The series premiere "Join The Club" was aired on 21 February 2016, while the eleventh episode "Waterfront" served as the season finale, and was aired on 1 May 2016. It was followed by a one-part reunion which marked the conclusion of the season and was broadcast on 15 May 2016.

Kylie Washington and Lisa Potasz are recognized as the series' executive producers, and Euan Jones, Virginia Hodgson, Philippa Rubira are recognized as series' producers. It is produced by Matchbox Pictures, and distributed by NBCUniversal International Television Production.

== Cast and synopsis ==
All seven housewives featured on the second season returned for the second installment, however it was revealed on by cast members Janet Roach and Gamble Breaux, that season two recurring cast member Manuela Pless-Bennett would not be returning for the third season. Although cast members Pettifleur Berenger and Lydia Schiavello returned for the third season of The Real Housewives of Melbourne, it was revealed after the conclusion of the third season by cast member, Roach and Chyka Keebaugh, that the two weren't initially set to return to the series.

The third season saw the introduction of a new wife, Susie McLean. McLean as a country born resident in Toorak who is described as resilient and open-hearted. Mclean joins the series having known Schiavello for thirty-years, Chyka Keebaugh for twenty-years, and Gina Liano for ten-years. Her country upbringing has instilled traditional values and good manners into McLean, as well as being very close to her large Italian family. With the values instilled, McLean aspired to open her own finishing school. McLean is a single, divorced mother of two boys, Monty, 19, and Rupert, 17. Having gone through two marriages, one to Rod Butterss that was highly publicised, McLean is embracing the single life. McLean devotes her time to being the current President of the Country Women's Association, in the Toorak branch. Away from raising her teenage boys and Country Women's Association, McLean spends her time to her passion of baking as well as her love of sport, which includes running, golf, skiing, boxing, horse-riding, wake-boarding and classical ballet.

== Reception ==
=== U.S. ratings ===
The Real Housewives of Melbourne returned to Bravo for its third season on 22 July 2016, this time airing prime-time on Friday, compared to season two which aired prime-time Sundays.

The Real Housewives of Melbourne, season 3 ratings
No.	Episode	Air date	Time slot (EST)	Rating/Share (18–49)	Total viewers
1	Join The Club	22 July 2016	Friday; 09:00 p.m.	0.11	317,000
2	Old Sparks, New Starts	29 July 2016	Friday; 09:00 p.m.	0.07	249,000
3	By Invitation Only	5 August 2016	Friday; 09:00 p.m.	0.11	271,000
4	Here Comes the Brides	12 August 2016	Friday; 09:00 p.m.	0.07	229,000
5	Gamble's Big Day	17 August 2016	Wednesday 10:00 p.m.	0.09	258,000
6	Bye Bye Byron	19 August 2016	Friday; 09:00 p.m.	0.16	477,000
7	Portrait Of Figaro	26 August 2016	Friday; 09:00 p.m.	0.10	345,000
8	Do Buy	31 August 2016	Wednesday 10:00 p.m.	0.10	345,000
9	Desert Storm	8 September 2016	Thursday 10:00 p.m.	0.12	445,000
10	Gossip Girl	16 September 2016	Friday; 09:00 p.m.	0.12	368,000
11	Waterfront	23 September 2016	Friday; 09:00 p.m.	0.09	305,000
12	Reunion	30 September 2016	Friday; 09:00 p.m.	0.09	347,000

=== Awards ===
In 2016, The Real Housewives of Melbourne season three was nominated for Reality Series Production in the Screen Producers Australia Awards, however the series was beaten by I’m A Celebrity Get Me Out Of Here! and The Great Australian Bake Off, who tied as winners.

== Taglines ==
- Chyka: "Honesty and integrity are my favourite accessories."
- Gamble: "I may run with the wolf pack but I tread my own path."
- Gina: "Persistence is king and I'm the queen of it."
- Jackie: "When you know who you are, you have nothing to prove."
- Janet: "I'm not everyone's drink of choice, but I'm my cup of tea."
- Lydia: "Yes I'm a flirt but home is where my heart is."
- Pettifleur: "I'm in the best shape of my life, who begs to differ?"
- Susie: "If you can't stand the heat, get out of my kitchen."

== Episodes ==
No. overall	No. in series	Title	Original release date	Overnight Australian viewers
26	1	"Join The Club"	21 February 2016	133,000
All the women are back, but new girl, Susie, wonders what planet she's landed on after inviting them over for a day of baking, but a full on brawl ensues.
27	2	"Old Sparks, New Starts"	28 February 2016	122,000
Janet has dinner with her ex husband; Gamble promotes her dress designer to wedding planner; Lydia becomes the topic of conversation when the women go horse riding.
28	3	"By Invitation Only"	6 March 2016	86,000
Gamble hosts a cocktail party where she plans to issue the wedding invitations but simmering tensions surface before all hell breaks loose.
29	4	"Here Comes the Brides"	13 March 2016	95,000
Chyka throws Gamble a bridal shower with a twist thanks to the strict dress code: wedding dress only. Turns out wearing your old frock can be an emotional trigger.
30	5	"Gamble's Big Day"	20 March 2016	145,000
The ladies head to Byron for Gamble's wedding. But with wild weather threatening the beach ceremony and everyone at logger heads, it's not exactly the smoothest of wedding days.
31	6	"Bye Bye Byron"	27 March 2016	125,000
Gina's early departure the night before the wedding turns the wives into reception detectives. Once back in Melbourne family's the focus with bitter sweet life lessons to confront.
32	7	"Portrait Of Figaro"	3 April 2016	106,000
Chyka hosts a glamorous middle eastern dinner to extend an exciting invitation to the ladies but the thrill is somewhat dampened when Pettifleur and Jackie start sparring.
33	8	"Do Buy"	10 April 2016	117,000
The housewives arrive in lavish, resplendent Dubai. But not even the world's largest shopping mall can curtail their bickering which is fuelled to boiling point by scorching desert temps.
34	9	"Desert Storm"	17 April 2016	137,000
After an impassioned dinner in the Dubai desert that frightens the camels, the wives recover over retail therapy in the souks before heading off to another explosive group dinner.
35	10	"Gossip Girl"	24 April 2016	127,000
As Dubai recovers from the high drama that accompanied the housewives on their trip, the women return to normality back home with family. But it's a normal only they understand.
36	11	"Waterfront"	1 May 2016	162,000
Lydia's mum celebrates her 69th birthday, Gina launches her perfume line and the ladies all get together for a final dramatic dinner come showdown at the Waterfront Restaurant.
37	12	"Reunion"	15 May 2016	132,000
After the most explosive season ever, temperatures soar as the ladies reunite for a fiery reunion. The Housewives air their grievances with tears, tantrums and plenty of allegations. Hosted by Alex Perry.

== Home media release ==
The third season was released on DVD in region 4 on 16 November 2016.
