= Gina Liano =

Italian-Australian barrister and television personality (born 1967)

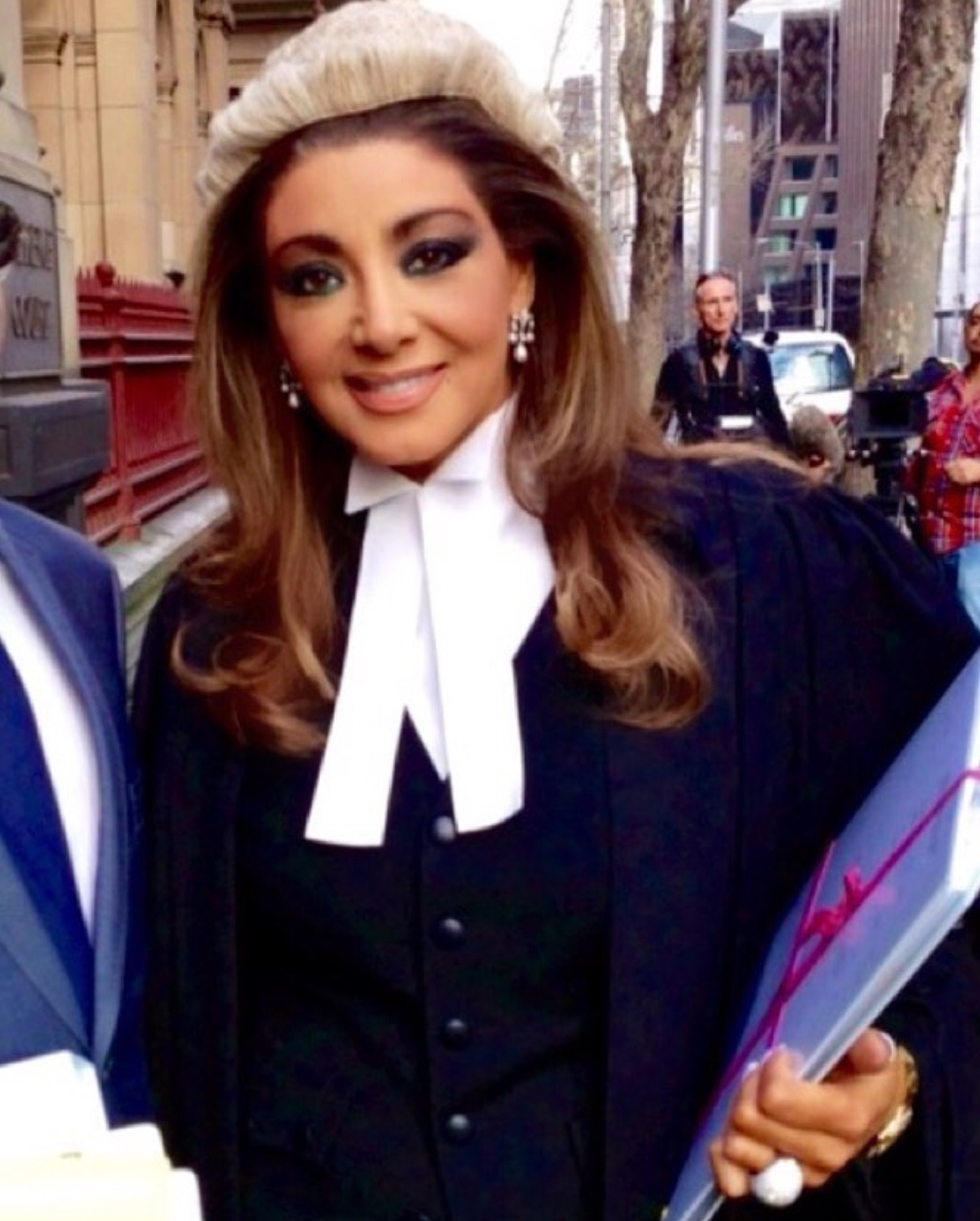
- Liano in 2016
- Born: Georgina Caroline Italiano; 18 May 1967 (age 59); Melbourne, Victoria, Australia
- Other name: Judge Gina
- Education: Monash University (BA); Monash University Faculty of Law (LLB)
- Occupations: Businesswoman, barrister, television personality, actress, wedding celebrant
- Years active: 1985–present
- Television: The Real Housewives of Melbourne (2014–2018); Neighbours (2015–2016)
- Partner: Dean Giannarelli (2005–2017)
- Children: 2
- Relatives: Bettina Liano (sister)
- Website: ginaliano.com

Signature
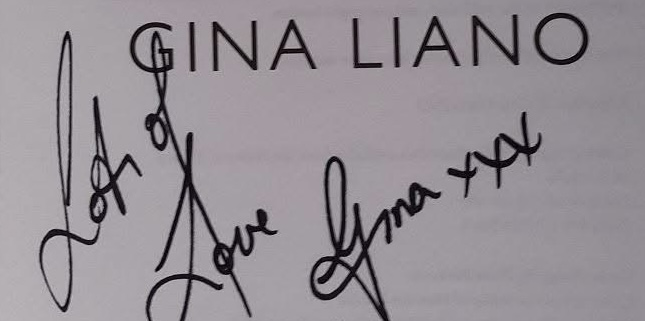

Georgina Caroline Italiano (born 18 May 1967), known professionally as Gina Liano, is an Italian-Australian businesswoman, barrister, television personality, actress, and wedding celebrant. She is best known as a former main cast member on the Arena reality television series The Real Housewives of Melbourne (2014–2018) and for her recurring role as Mary Smith in the 10 Peach soap opera Neighbours (2015–2016).

== Early life ==
Georgina Caroline Italiano was born in Melbourne, Victoria, Australia on 18 May 1967, as the youngest child to Nicola "Nick" Italiano and his wife, Anita Bonollo, a psychologist. Her parents are Italian immigrants. She has a brother, Ben, and two sisters, Teresa Liano and Bettina Liano; both her sisters are fashion designers. Her parents later divorced.

Liano attended Star of the Sea College, an independent Catholic day school for girls, in Brighton, Victoria. She graduated in 1983. She attended Monash University, where she gained her Bachelor of Arts (BA) degree in 1992, followed by her Bachelor of Laws (LLB) degree from Monash University Faculty of Law in 1995.

== Career ==
Liano began her professional career in 1985, at the age of 18, when she entered into business with her sisters, running a chain of boutiques.

Liano was admitted as a lawyer on 2 June 1997. She joined the Victorian Bar on 27 May 1999. She is a barrister who practices in criminal law, international torts, commercial law, family law, and employment law.

On 28 July 2013, it was announced that Liano had joined the main cast member of the Arena reality television series The Real Housewives of Melbourne, the first Australian installment in the American Real Housewives franchise, alongside Jackie Gillies, Chyka Keebaugh, Andrea Moss, Janet Roach, and Lydia Schiavello. She was handpicked by the producers from over 100 women during an eight-month process. Filming for the series began in July 2013. The first season premiered on 23 February 2014, marking her television debut. On 8 May 2014, the series was renewed for a second season. Filming for the series began in August 2014. The second season premiered on 22 February 2015, with Pettifleur Berenger and Gamble Breaux joining the cast. On 7 June 2015, the series was renewed for a third season. Filming for the series began in July 2015. The third season premiered on 21 February 2016, with Susie McLean joining the cast. On 22 June 2016, she confirmed there would be a fourth season but filming may be delayed to film the second Australian installment, The Real Housewives of Sydney, adding: "the original girls are out of contract now. They haven't approached us to renegotiate contracts yet." In December 2016, a fourth season was officially confirmed by Foxtel, while also reporting that filming was set to being in early 2017. The fourth season premiered on 6 December 2017, with Venus Behbahani-Clark and Sally Bloomfield joining the cast. In September 2019, Foxtel announced a fifth season, set to premiere in 2020. In February 2020, it was reported that she would be returning for the fifth season. Filming for the series was temporarily halted by the COVID-19 pandemic. In April 2021, she announced her departure from the series after four seasons.

On 6 April 2015, it was announced that Liano had joined the recurring cast of the 10 Peach soap opera Neighbours as Mary Smith, the adoptive mother of the already established character Paige Smith (Olympia Valance), marking her debut as an actress. Luke Dennehy of the Herald Sun reported that the casting directors hired her after she impressed them with a screen test. She began filming on 14 April 2015. Her look and style was not changed for the part and she said that it was one of the reasons she was chosen to play the role. She made her debut screen appearance in the episode broadcast on 30 June 2015, when Mary came to Erinsborough for her adopted daughter Paige's 21st birthday. Her debut screen appearance was first broadcast in the United Kingdom on 14 July 2015. She reprised the role of Mary, and made her final appearance in the episode broadcast on 11 February 2016.

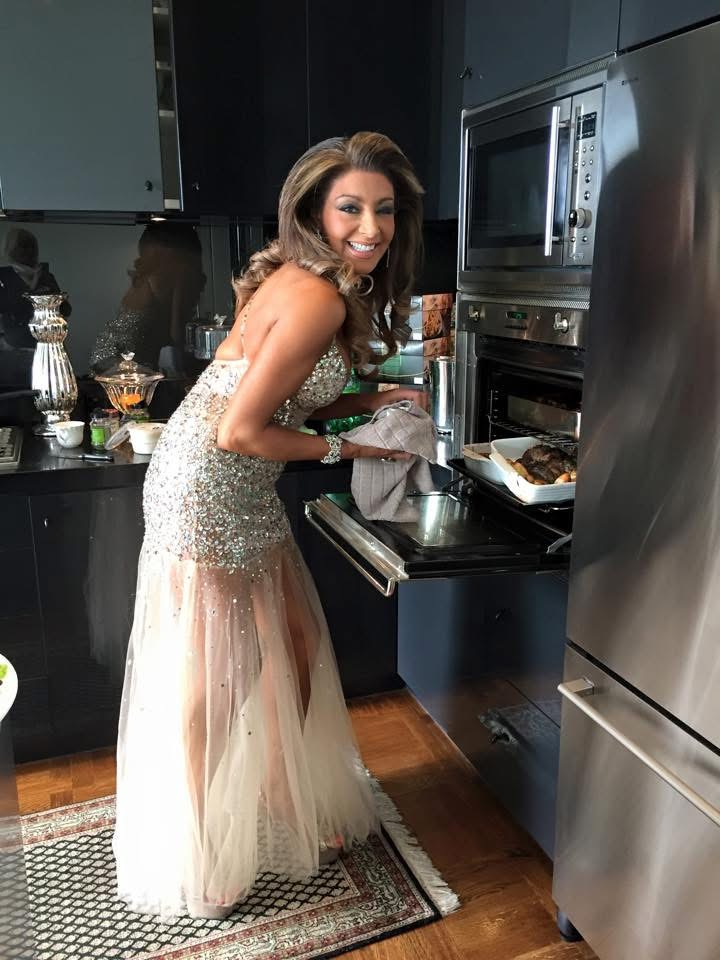
Liano in 2015

Liano authored her autobiography, Fearless: My Life, My Way (ISBN 9781743794937), which was published by Hardie Grant Books in April 2015.

Liano appeared as the guest quiz master on the premiere episode in the third season of the Network 10 panel quiz show Have You Been Paying Attention?, which was broadcast on 11 May 2015.

On 20 July 2015, it was announced the Liano would appear as a contestant in the fourth season of the Nine Network reality television series The Celebrity Apprentice Australia. The season debuted on 16 September 2015 and on the fourth week, she was hospitalised with "a nasty bug" during the challenge and did not participate, withdrawing from the competition in a video at the end of the episode, which was broadcast on 7 October 2015. She said she felt like she was unable to participate in the next challenge also. Her charity of choice was Cancer Council Victoria.

Liano released her own fragrance, Gina by Gina Liano, in 2016. After much success, she released two more fragrances, Fearless by Gina Liano and Luminous by Gina Liano. She has released her own jewellery range. In 2017, she released her own tanning range, Flawless by Gina Liano. She is also a successful property developer and is a qualified art gallery curator.

In January 2016, it was announced that Liano would make her theatre debut in July, as the Wicked Stepmother in the pantomime adaptation of Cinderella at the State Theatre in Sydney.

Liano has been an ordained wedding celebrant since 2017. She officiated her first same-sex marriage on Valentine's Day.

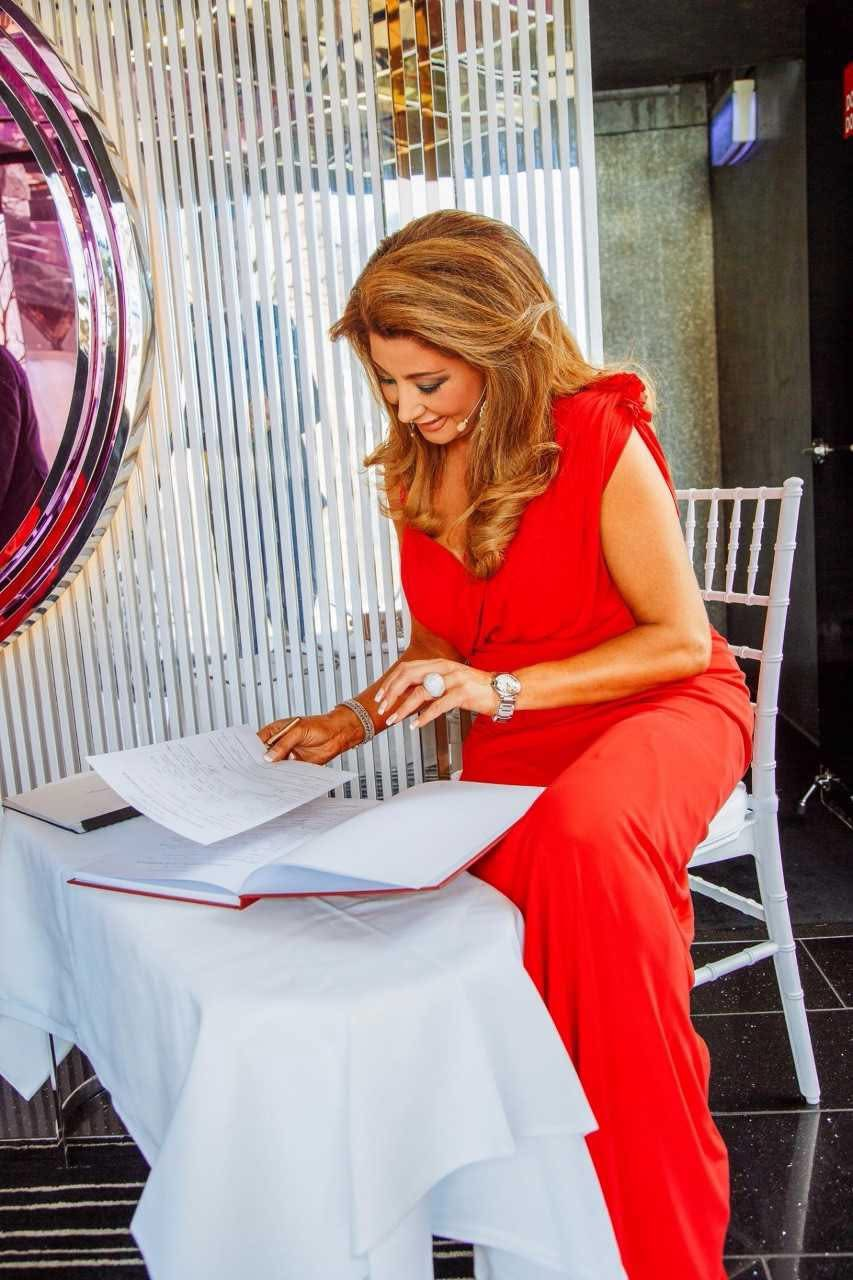
Liano officiating a wedding ceremony in 2018

Liano appeared as the celebrity with a problem to solve on the fifth episode in the second season of the Network 10 comedy panel series Hughesy, We Have a Problem. The episode was broadcast on 24 April 2018, and was presented by Dave Hughes, with guests Urzila Carlson, Merrick Watts, Em Rusciano, and Jason Byrne.

Liano appeared on the eighth episode of the Seven Network comedy game show Behave Yourself!, as a panellist. The episode was broadcast on New Year's Eve 2019. Liano and Lawrence Mooney (Team 3) won the episode, alongside Chloe Esposito and Jason Byrne (Team 1), and Nazeem Hussain and Michala Banas (Team 2).

Liano appeared on the fifth episode in the first season of the Network 10 comedy panel game show Would I Lie To You?, as a panellist. The episode was recorded in December 2021 and was broadcast on 28 March 2022. She was on Chris Taylor's team along with Lloyd Langford, competing against Daniel MacPherson and Claire Hooper on Frank Woodley's team.

Liano hosted her own weekly podcast series Judge Gina on ARN's iHeartPodcast Network from July to October 2023, which consisted of 12 episodes.

== Personal life ==
Gina Liano has been married and divorced twice. She has two sons, Christos Nicolas (born 1990) and Myles Reyntjes (born 1996), both of whom she raised as a single mother.

Liano was diagnosed with bowel cancer in 2003. She went into remission after 12 months of chemotherapy and radiation therapy. She is an ambassador for Cancer Council Victoria.

Liano was in an on-again, off-again relationship with Dean John Giannarelli from 2005 to 2017. She was the stepmother to his four children, including Dion Giannarelli, who appeared on the ninth season of the Nine Network reality television series Married at First Sight in 2022.

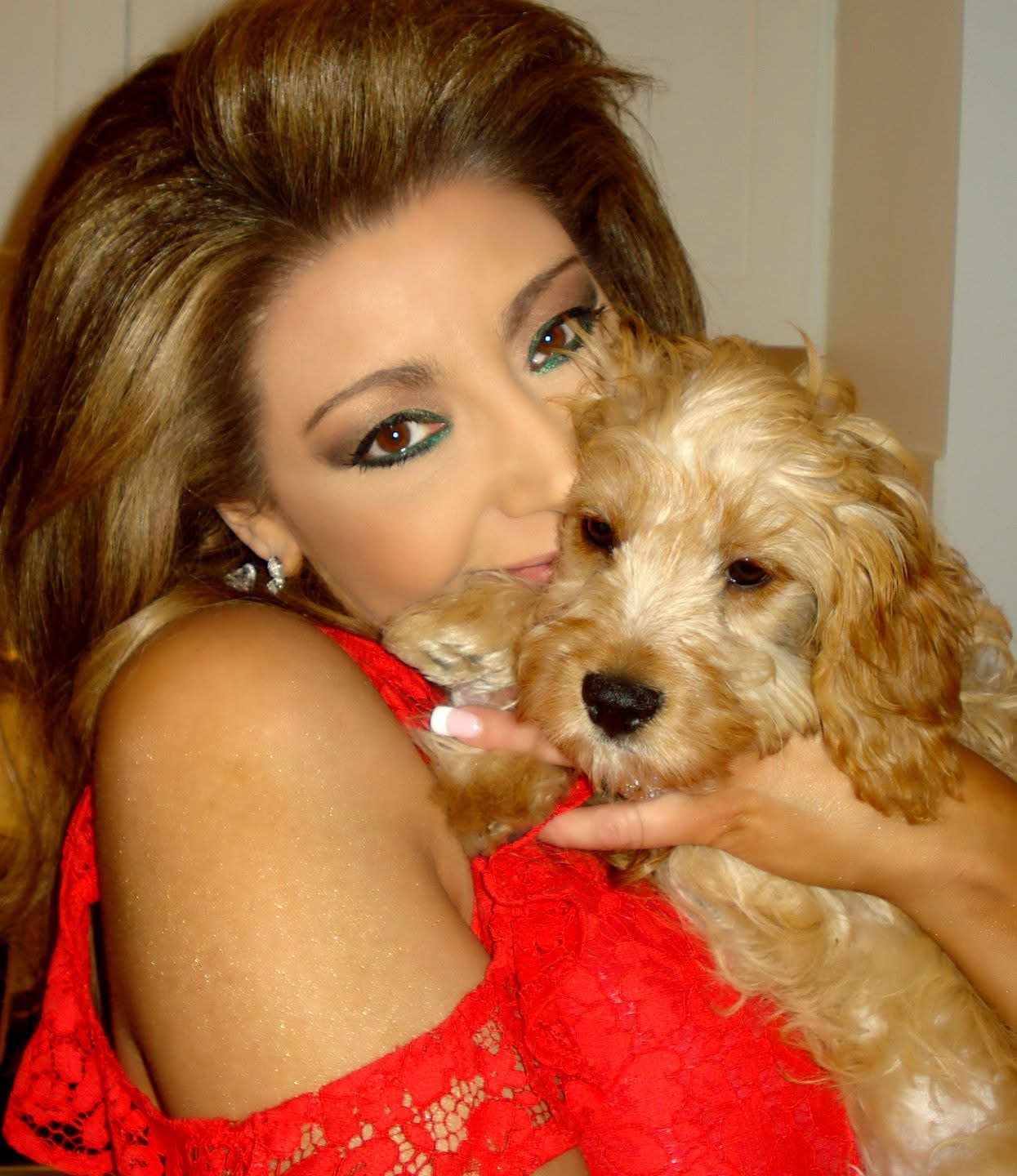
Liano in 2018

Liano purchased a $2.4M home in Brighton, Victoria in October 2022, where she lives with her Labradoodle, Ninja, and her two Cavoodles, Noodles and Chewie.

== Filmography ==
=== As herself ===
Year	Title	Notes
2014–2018	The Real Housewives of Melbourne	49 episodes
2015	The 57th Annual TV Week Logie Awards	Television special
2015	Have You Been Paying Attention?	1 episode
2015	The Celebrity Apprentice Australia	4 episodes
2016	Weekend Sunrise	1 episode
2018	Hughesy, We Have a Problem	1 episode
2019	Behave Yourself!	1 episode
2022	Would I Lie to You?	1 episode
2023	Judge Gina	Podcast series

=== As an actress ===
Year	Title	Role	Notes
2015–2016	Neighbours	Mary Smith	7 episodes
2018	Tara Tremendous	Queen Oceannia	Podcast series
