= The Real Housewives of Melbourne season 1 =

Season of television series

The Real Housewives of Melbourne
- Season 1
- Promotional poster (Left to right) Liano, Moss, Roach, Keebaugh, Gillies, and Schiavello
- Starring: Jackie Gillies; Chyka Keebaugh; Gina Liano; Andrea Moss; Janet Roach; Lydia Schiavello
- No. of episodes: 12

Release
- Original network: Arena
- Original release: 23 February – 11 May 2014

Season chronology
- Next → Season 2

The first season of The Real Housewives of Melbourne, an Australian reality television series, was broadcast on Arena. It aired from 23 February 2014, until 11 May 2014, and was primarily filmed in Melbourne, Victoria. Its executive producers are Kylie Washington and Lisa Potasz.

The Real Housewives of Melbourne focuses on the lives of Jackie Gillies, Chyka Keebaugh, Gina Liano, Andrea Moss, Janet Roach, and Lydia Schiavello; It consisted of twelve episodes.

== Production and crew ==
The Real Housewives of Melbourne was first announced by Matchbox Pictures as The Real Housewives of Australia and was set to air in 2013. On 28 July 2013 it was announced that the series had been renamed to The Real Housewives of Melbourne, along with the full cast. The six women featured on the first season were handpicked by the producers, from over one-hundred women during an eight-month process. Filming for the season began in July 2013. The official cast photo and premiere date for the series was announced on 21 January 2014. The series at the time was the second biggest local series launch following SoHo's Wentworth. The two-part reunion, hosted by Alex Perry, was filmed late March 2014.

The series premiere "First Impressions" was aired on 23 February 2014, while the tenth episode "Here's to Happy Endings" served as the season finale, and was aired on 27 April 2014. It was followed by a two-part reunion which marked the conclusion of the season and was broadcast on 4 May and 11 May 2014.

Kylie Washington and Lisa Potasz are recognized as the series' executive producers, and Euan Jones, Virginia Hodgson, Philippa Rubira are recognized as series' producers. It is produced by Matchbox Pictures, and distributed by NBCUniversal International Television Production.

== Cast and synopsis ==
Six housewives are featured during the first season of The Real Housewives of Melbourne, who are described as "sophisticated and affluent" women "who love to indulge in the finer things in life as well as high end drama." The six wives featured during the first season are Jackie Gillies, Chyka Keebaugh, Gina Liano, Andrea Moss, Janet Roach, and Lydia Schiavello.

Gillies is described as someone who is opinionated, spiritual and confident. The Croatian-born housewife is youngest of the housewives and has recently moved from Newcastle with her husband, Ben Gillies. Gillies had met her husband, the drummer of the Australian rock band Silverchair when she was fifteen years of age. The couple reconnected after their fourteen years of meeting and married in 2010, and since then the couple have endeavored to launch their own alcohol line, La Máscara. The pair own many properties across Australia, as well as along the coast in Croatia. Gillies is a professional psychic of which she has many clients including celebrities.

Keebaugh is a mother, businesswoman and socialite.She and her husband, Bruce have been married for twenty-two years and together they have two children; a daughter named Chrissy, 19 and a son named BJ, 18. The two have created and built a privately owned catering and event companies, The Big Group. The couple are now expanding their business across to additional locations in Melbourne. With such busy schedules the couple make sure they meet up at least once a week to connect and discuss which events they'll attend.

Liano is a divorced single mother of two teenage boys, as well her beloved poodle, Ninja, who has survived cancer. Although Liano loves fashion, she followed in her own footsteps and entered law, whereas her sisters, Teresa and Bettina Liano, are renowned fashion designers. Liano has been in law for fourteen years and now works as a criminal barrister, preferring to fight for the little guy. Liano not only knows about fashion and law, she also works as a property developer and is and a qualified art gallery curator. Away from raising her two sons and working, Liano spends her time looking for a home to live in as her apartment is currently under construction.

Moss previously worked in New York City for ABC and for Channel 7 in Sydney as a TV reporter prior to her marriage and is described to be generous as she gives at least a thousand dollars to charity on a weekly basis. Since marrying Dr. Chris Moss, one Australia's most successful plastic surgeons, the couple have gone on to have three children together. Moss has a busy schedule helping run her husband's skin center, Liberty Belle Skin Centre, managing the construction and planning of their new business as well as writing a book that is designed to help show other mothers how to get back to work.

Roach, who is described as a newly single bombshell who is fun-loving, spontaneous and a social butterfly, is a property developer who is self-made having never worked for anyone else. Recently divorced Roach, after catching her ex-husband cheating, is on a journey in a new chapter of her life. Roach is a mother of two boys, Paul, 29, and Jake, 25, as well as a step-mother of three who she remains close to. Roach is an active property developer who is currently working of developing a massive elderly lifestyle village in Mildura, as well as renovating her Red Hill property. Away from dating and working, Roach dedicates herself to overseeing her son's treatments, as Jake was burnt in a fire two years ago and received burns to 70% of his body which he barely survived.

Schiavello is a mother of three; two boys, one girl, and step-mother of three, who is described as honest, self-assured and someone that calls it as she sees it. Schiavello has recently married well-known architect and property developer, Andrew Norbury, in Florence, Italy. In Melbourne, the pair often fly around in their private jet, especially to their holiday home in Thredbo. Schiavello is currently following her passion of interior design by studying at the Royal Melbourne Institute of Technology. Schiavello often devotes her time to her philanthropic ventures such as Murdoch Children's Research Institute, as well as spoiling her beloved dog, Figaro.

== Reception ==
Season one of The Real Housewives of Melbourne, broke the record of the largest audience of a reality program to air on Foxtel, with a total of 542,000 viewers. It continued to average at least 428,000 viewers each episode. The season was described by Foxtel Executive Director of Television, Brian Walsh, as a game changer for Foxtel as well as obtaining blockbuster ratings, as huge social media impact, and an overall buzz surrounding the series.

=== U.S. ratings ===
The season premiered in the United States, 3 August 2014, on Bravo, the same network that initiated The Real Housewives franchise, during an afternoon time-slot. The premiere attracted an approximately 414,000 total viewers. The premiere was followed by the second episode and attracted approximately a total of 403,000 viewers. Compared the month prior the two hours of which the first and second episode aired, it saw a 39% increase in overall viewers and 42% in the younger demographic.

=== Awards ===
In 2015, Paula Zorgdrager, an editor for The Real Housewives of Melbourne, was nominated for Best Editing In Television in the fifth Australian Academy of Cinema and Television Arts Awards for the first episode, however the series was beaten by The Code. Later in 2015, The Real Housewives of Melbourne season one, was nominated for Most Outstanding Reality Program in the 2015 ASTRA Awards, however the series was beaten by The Recruit.

== Taglines ==
- Andrea: "Never come between a woman and her plastic surgeon."
- Chyka: "My fabulous life comes down to love and laughter- not luck."
- Gina: "I’ll give you my opinion, but you’d better be ready to hear it."
- Jackie: "My husband may be a rock star but now it’s my turn to shine, shine, shine!"
- Janet: "When life throws rocks, I melt them down into diamonds."
- Lydia: "I may look like a jetsetter, but my feet are firmly on the ground."

== Episodes ==
| No. overall | No. in series | Title | Original release date | Overnight Australian viewers |
|---|---|---|---|---|
| 1 | 1 | "First Impressions" | 23 February 2014 | 117,000 |
Lydia meets up with Andrea and Gina. Janet has a psychic reading by fellow housewife Jackie. Janet invites Jackie to the Liberty Belle party hosted by Andrea. All 6 women to come together for the first time. Jackie throws a spanner in the works with her unnerving psychic predictions.
| 2 | 2 | "Pick a Side" | 2 March 2014 | 103,000 |
Jackie is quizzed for psychic vibes, Gina heads straight to the States leaving the other girls speculating why. Lydia invites Jackie to a local gallery and Chyka invites the wives to food tasting where Gina is the topic of conversation. Jackie and Gina have a confrontation in a cafe.
| 3 | 3 | "New Kids on the Block" | 9 March 2014 | 83,000 |
Janet visits Dr Chris Moss for some 'freshening' and Jackie attends as support. Lydia and her husband Andrew fly to King Island for a spot of cheese tasting. Gina's back from the States, after making a life altering decision about her partner. Jackie and Ben host a Mexican-themed housewarming party and Ben confronts Gina about her issues with his wife.
| 4 | 4 | "Ice Queens" | 16 March 2014 | 85,000 |
Lydia invites Jackie and Andrea away for skiing in Thredbo. Andrea and Lydia share their insights on money and relationships, Jackie bemused. Back in Melbourne, Chyka and Gina help Janet chose outfits for her date that night with a younger man. Unbeknownst to Janet, the girls stick around for a quick spy while the couple have dinner.
| 5 | 5 | "Birthday Girl" | 23 March 2014 | 72,000 |
Bruce manages to steal Chyka away for a romantic date night. Janet celebrates her birthday by picking up her sparkling three carat diamond ring.
| 6 | 6 | "Anyone for Tennis?" | 30 March 2014 | 92,000 |
Lydia's studying design at Andrea's alarmed at the slow building progress at the new Liberty Belle Skin and Janet's reworking her increasingly expensive renovations at Red Hill. Andrea hosts a tennis day at her beach house on the Mornington Peninsula. Jackie suggests a late night salsa lesson.
| 7 | 7 | "Travelling North" | 6 April 2014 | 83,000 |
Chyka invites everyone to the Elandra resort at Mission Beach, QLD. The breathtaking helicopter ride there provides a welcome distraction from the growing tension.
| 8 | 8 | "No Show or Go Show?" | 13 April 2014 | 108,000 |
The ladies return from Mission Beach with more baggage than they started out with and all somewhat stunned at the turn of events.
| 9 | 9 | "Pooch Party" | 20 April 2014 | 92,000 |
Gina enlists the help of a dating agency. Chyka asks Andrea, Lydia and Gina homewares shopping, which doesn't go to plan. Chyka hosts a pooch party for the girls and their pooches. Jackie and Ben show business mentor Chyka the labels on their new cocktail line. At an Emirates party Lydia questions Janet about something Gina said in a phone call. Janet meets Gina for a drink and things quickly turn sour.
| 10 | 10 | "Here's to Happy Endings" | 27 April 2014 | 85,000 |
Jackie and Ben audition burlesque dancer, Bella de Jac, for the La Mascara launch. Andrea shoots the cover of her book, The Working Mother's Revenge. Gina hosts a Girls Night In fundraising evening in aid of cancer research. Chyka encourages Gina and Andrea to meet.
| 11 | 11 | "Reunion – Part 1" | 4 May 2014 | 149,000 |
Alex Perry hosts this drama filled reunion, as the housewives come together to discuss the series, their relationships, and also the contents of that frequently talked about email.
| 12 | 12 | "Reunion – Part 2" | 11 May 2014 | 95,000 |
The housewives continue to discuss the highs and lows of the series, the accusations, the Chinese whispers and everyone's favourite pampered pooch, Figaro.

== Home media release ==
The first season was released on DVD in region 4 on 6 November 2014.
