= The Real Housewives of Melbourne season 4 =

The Real Housewives of Melbourne
- Season 4
- Starring: Jackie Gillies; Gina Liano; Janet Roach; Lydia Schiavello; Gamble Breaux; Venus Behbahani Clark; Sally Bloomfield
- No. of episodes: 12

Release
- Original network: Arena
- Original release: 6 December 2017 – 21 February 2018

Season chronology
- ← Previous; Season 3 Next → Season 5

The fourth season of The Real Housewives of Melbourne, an Australian reality television series, was broadcast on Arena. It aired from 6 December 2017, until 21 February 2018, and was primarily filmed in Melbourne, Victoria. Its executive producers are Kylie Washington and Lisa Potasz for Matchbox Pictures, part of NBCUniversal International Studios, in conjunction with Foxtel.

The Real Housewives of Melbourne focuses on the lives of Jackie Gillies, Gina Liano, Janet Roach, Lydia Schiavello, Gamble Breaux, Sally Bloomfield and Venus Behbahani Clark; It consisted of twelve episodes.

== Production and crew ==
On 11 May 2016, Lydia Schiavello revealed there would be a fourth season but filming may be delayed to film The Real Housewives of Sydney first. A month later in June 2016, Liano also confirmed there would be a season four and the filming delay for the Sydney series, adding that "the original girls are out of contract now. They haven't approached us to renegotiate contracts yet." In December 2016, season four was officially confirmed by Foxtel, also being reported that filming is set to begin in early 2017.

== Cast and synopsis ==
Five of the eight housewives from season 3 returned for the new season. Prior to the conclusion of the third season, on 8 May 2016, original housewife Chyka Keebaugh announced that she would not be returning to the series. On 29 April 2017, Pettifeur Berenger announced that she would also not be returning to the new series. Shortly after, on 30 April 2017, Susie McLean also parted ways with the show deciding to focus on other projects. On 17 May 2017, the season 4 cast was announced, with Venus Behbahani-Clark and Sally Bloomfield joining the cast along with the returning cast members Liano, Schiavello, Gillies, Breaux and Roach. This also confirmed the departures of Keebaugh, Berenger and McLean. However, Keebaugh did make a guest appearance during one episode in the fourth season.

Venus Behbahani Clark, a 35-year-old mother of two is “Persian born. She grew up in Italy migrating to Australia in the ‘80s.” Venus is a housewife lawyer and is also currently working on her own line of contouring cosmetics. She is described as “incredibly competitive, opinionated, smart and confident” She has 2 children Giselle and Sophia both from a previous marriage. Venus and her husband James own property in Melbourne, Dubai and Lake Como.

Sally Bloomfield is a 51-year-old widow and mother of two boys Nic and Jules. She owns a homewares store, Bloomfield and Webber in Barwon Heads, and a boutique hotel in Bali. She is also set to launch her accessories range, Bloomfield - focussing on sunglasses and handbags later this year. Sally used to be the editor of the Melbourne edition of the Harper's Bazaar Magazine and has lived in Bali for the last five years.

== Taglines ==
- Gina: "I stand by what I say, but not how you interpret it."
- Gamble: "When you finally fall on your feet, people will still try to bring you down."
- Lydia: "I save my best pot stirring for the kitchen."
- Sally: "I've turned each painful ending into a big beautiful beginning."
- Janet: "If you're offended by what I say, imagine what i'm thinking."
- Venus: "When you're named after the hottest planet, things are sure to get fiery."
- Jackie: "I'll always follow my intuition and let the angels do the rest."

== Episodes ==
No. overall	No. in series	Title	Original release date	Overnight Australian viewers
38	1	"Venus Rising"	6 December 2017	98,000
Gina and Lydia’s friendship has come full circle, with the two growing closer than ever. While Gina is grateful for Lydia’s support throughout a difficult time, it seems the same can’t be said for Gamble, who finds herself increasingly on the outs. Gina hosts a dinner for all the girls, except for Gamble, which prompts Jackie to question if Gina is replacing Gamble with new girl Venus. At dinner, Lydia confronts Jackie about their unresolved issues, and Gina is shocked when a mysterious gift arrives at the table.
39	2	"House of Lords"	13 December 2017	95,000
We are introduced to new girl Sally, a friend and associate of Janet's. Lydia shares her new cooking class concept with her husband Andrew, and Janet hosts a party at her new man's mansion with all the girls in attendance. It doesn't take long for tensions arise with Gamble's arrival, both confronting Gina and creating an awkward situation for Venus and her husband.
40	3	"Midsummer Madness"	20 December 2017	81,000
Venus and James are still smarting from Gamble's mockery of their 'lord and lady' titles despite Gina and Lydia's advice to let it go. Chyka invites Janet, Jackie and Sally to her huge country cottage to catch up on the girls' latest antics. Gamble hosts her stepson Luke's 21st fairy themed party where it is revealed that Venus allegedly has some compromising photographs of the girls on her phone.
41	4	"Dishing The Dirt"	27 December 2017	55,000
Sally and Gamble get together over lunch to discuss the mystery surrounding Venus and the photos. Venus advises her younger sister Rebecca that it’s time to tell their father that her wedding is off. Lydia organises a day of truffle hunting in the country, giving Sally the chance to confront Venus about the photos. Meanwhile Janet, Jackie and Gamble chopper off to Levantine Hill Vineyard. The three are determined to get to the bottom of the mystery surrounding Venus, and with Janet’s latest intel, things are set to get interesting.
42	5	"Sally Can't Wait"	3 January 2018	94,000
Sally invites the girls to celebrate the launch of her accessories line, but things go a little pear shaped when Gamble and Venus lock horns and Lydia stirs things up with Jackie and Janet.
43	6	"It’s My Party I’ll Invite Who I Want To"	10 January 2018	98,000
Venus, Lydia and Gina catch up but it’s the ongoing feud between Lydia and Jackie that dominates the conversation. Unsurprisingly, Jackie has a very different take on things to Lydia and she heads over to Chyka’s place for a chat. After successfully launching her accessories range Sally is now preparing to open her hotel in Bali. When Gamble shares her suspicions that their new house is haunted with Rick and Luke, the boys aren’t so sure. Then, the girls celebrate Jackie’s 37th birthday in style, with the notable exception of Lydia. Jackie takes everyone by surprise by inviting them on an overseas trip, motivating Venus to patch things up with Gamble.
44	7	"Tequila Sunrise"	17 January 2018	93,000
The housewives arrive in beautiful Cabo San Lucas, Mexico, ready to kick up their heels and have some fun, but while six of them are sipping cocktails, Venus is back in Melbourne desperately searching for her misplaced passport. Gina, Lydia and Sally decide to ease into holiday mode and stay by the pool. Feeling adventurous, Jackie, Gamble and Janet go in search of Cabo's best taco. In the evening, the ladies head out for a lovely dinner, but the party atmosphere sours quickly when Jackie confronts Lydia over the so-called rift between her and Janet. All the arguing overshadows Venus' arrival and Gina's treatment of Gamble prompts a clash with Sally, leading to Gina storming out of the dinner in a huff.
45	8	"Tequila Sunset"	24 January 2018	109,000
The housewives set sail for some fun in the sun on a catamaran off Cabo’s coast but beneath the calm waters a storm is brewing between Gina and Sally. At dinner that night, the girls put their differences aside and open up about past relationships, sharing the lessons they’ve learnt through heartache. But the love swiftly evaporates when Gina and Sally go head to head, with accusations of racism and bullying being thrown around.
46	9	"Getting into the Spirit"	31 January 2018	85,000
Jackie takes to the stage for her debut Shine It Up show in front of 300 eager fans. Venus holds a make-up masterclass showcasing her new contouring cosmetics, and reveals her true self. In an effort to bid farewell to the ghosts currently haunting her house, Gamble invites the girls to a seance.
47	10	"Happy Birthday Baby"	7 February 2018	85,000
Venus plans the ultimate fourth birthday party for her youngest daughter, Sophia. Jackie is the proud recipient of a great honour in her hometown of Newcastle. A nervous Gamble rehearses her surprise song for Rick, and Sally drops by for moral support. Sophia’s party enchants even the most hardened housewives, but Gamble’s attempt to compliment Venus backfires in her face.
48	11	"The Great Divide"	14 February 2018	98,000
Gamble brings Rick to tears with her anniversary gift. Later, Lydia hosts a dinner for the girls and the night descends into chaos after Lydia attempts to say a few words about each of the girls. Sally and Gina have another war of words over their blow up in Mexico.
49	12	"Reunion"	21 February 2018	73,000
The housewives come together with Alex Perry for the most explosive reunion yet. With bullying and body image on the agenda there are sure to be a few bombshells dropped.
