= AACTA Award for Best Reality Television Series =

Category in the AACTA Awards, Australia

Best Reality Television Series AACTA Award
- Country: Australia
- Presented by: Australian Academy of Cinema and Television Arts (AACTA)
- First award: 2013
- Currently held by: MasterChef Australia (2021)
- Website: http://www.aacta.org

The AACTA Award for Best Reality Television Series is an award presented by the Australian Academy of Cinema and Television Arts (AACTA), a non-profit organisation whose aim is to "identify, award, promote and celebrate Australia's greatest achievements in film and television." The award is presented at the annual AACTA Awards, which hand out accolades for achievements in feature film, television, documentaries and short films. The award was first introduced in 2012, for the 2nd AACTA Awards in 2013, due to the growth of reality television productions in Australia. Reality television productions could previously be submitted in the Best Light Entertainment Series category.

To be eligible, the production being submitted must: be significantly non-scripted; "involve participants being placed in an environment or format in which the premise, circumstances or situations they encounter are manipulated for the purposes of creating the program"; be no less than four episodes of at least half an hour in length; not be a news, current affairs, light entertainment or documentary series; and not be a production that requires a producer to set up a situation "that is then observed with minimal further intervention by the producers". The winner of the award is the producer of the program.

Masterchef Australia has received six wins from ten nominations, more than any other program. Programs from the Network 10 have received the most nominations with 18. Network 10 have received the most overall wins, with eight.

== Winners and nominees ==
Winner

Year	Program	Network	Recipient
2012 (2nd)
2012 (2nd)	The Amazing Race Australia	Seven Network	David Gardner and Matthew Kowald
2012 (2nd)	Masterchef Australia (series 4)	Network Ten	Tim Toni
2012 (2nd)	My Kitchen Rules (series 3)	Seven Network	Matt Apps, Greg Swanborough and Evan Wilkes
2012 (2nd)	The Voice	Nine Network	Julie Ward
2013 (3rd)
2013 (3rd)	MasterChef Australia: The Professionals	Network Ten	Margaret Bashfield, David McDonald, Mark Barlin, and Tim Toni
2013 (3rd)	Australia's Got Talent (series 7)	Nine Network	Greg Beness and Steve Kelly
2013 (3rd)	My Kitchen Rules (series 4)	Seven Network	Rikkie Proost, Matt Apps, Evan Wilkes and Greg Swanborough
2013 (3rd)	The X Factor (series 4)	Seven Network	Jonathon Summerhayes
2014 (4th)
2014 (4th)	The Voice	Nine Network	Julie Ward
2014 (4th)	MasterChef Australia (series 6)	Network Ten	Margaret Bashfield, Dave Forrester, David McDonald, and Keely Sonntag
2014 (4th)	The Voice Kids	Nine Network	Julie Ward
2014 (4th)	The X Factor	Seven Network	Jonathon Summerhayes
2015 (5th)
2015 (5th)	MasterChef Australia (series 7)	Network Ten	Margaret Bashfield, Marty Benson, Tim Toni and Rob Wallace
2015 (5th)	My Kitchen Rules (series 6)	Seven Network	Rikkie Proost, Evan Wilkes and Matt Apps
2015 (5th)	The Real Housewives of Melbourne (season 2)	Arena	Kylie Washington, Lisa Potasz and Virginia Hodgson
2015 (5th)	The Voice	Nine Network	Richard Rietveld
2015 (5th)	The X Factor	Seven Network	Digby Mitchell
2016 (6th)
2016 (6th)	MasterChef Australia (series 8)	Network Ten	Marty Benson, Tim Toni and Rob Wallace
2016 (6th)	My Kitchen Rules (series 7)	Seven Network	Matt Apps, Joe Herdman and Rikkie Proost
2016 (6th)	First Dates	Seven Network	Geraldine Orrock, Bikkie Proost and Brad Gustafson
2016 (6th)	The Recruit	Fox8	Luke Tuncliffe and Lara Hopkins
2017 (7th)
2017 (7th)	MasterChef Australia (series 9)	Network Ten	Marty Benson, Adam Fergusson and Tim Toni
2017 (7th)	Australian Survivor (season 4)	Network Ten	Peter Newman, Amelia Fisk, Tim Toni, Mark Barlin
2017 (7th)	Little Big Shots	Seven Network	Shaun Murphy, Sophia Mogford, Nick Davies
2017 (7th)	My Kitchen Rules (series 8)	Seven Network	Joe Herdman, Matt Apps
2018 (8th)
2018 (8th)	Australian Survivor (Champions vs. Contenders)	Network Ten	Amelia Fisk, Georgina Hinds and Adam Fergusson
2018 (8th)	Masterchef Australia (series 10)	Network Ten	Marty Benson, Tim Toni, Adam Fergusson
2018 (8th)	My Kitchen Rules (series 9)	Seven Network	Matt Apps, Joe Herdman
2018 (8th)	The Real Housewives of Melbourne (season 4)	Arena	Kylie Washington, Lisa Potasz, Natalie Brosnan, Pip Rubira
2018 (8th)	The Single Wives	Seven Network	Paul Franklin, Chris Culvenor
2019 (9th)
2019 (9th)	Australian Survivor (Champions vs. Contenders II)	Network 10	Amelia Fisk and Adam Fergusson
2019 (9th)	The Block (season 15)	Nine Network	Julian Cress, David Barbour
2019 (9th)	Married at First Sight	Nine Network	Tara McWilliams, Emma Lamb, Kate Feely
2019 (9th)	Masterchef Australia (series 11)	Network 10	Marty Benson, Adam Fergusson
2019 (9th)	My Kitchen Rules (series 10)	Seven Network	Joe Herdman, David Dutton, Nicole Anthony, Therese Hegarty, Angus Ross
2020 (10th)
2020 (10th)	Masterchef Australia (Back To Win)	Network 10	Marty Benson and Adam Fergusson
2020 (10th)	The Amazing Race Australia (season 4)	Network 10	Paul Franklin, Chris Culvenor, Sophia Mogford, Stephen Tate
2020 (10th)	Australian Survivor (All Stars)	Network 10	Amelia Fisk, Keely Sonntag, Adam Fergusson
2020 (10th)	The Block (season 16)	Nine Network	David Barbour, Julian Cress
2020 (10th)	I'm A Celebrity... Get Me Out Of Here! (season 6)	Network 10	Ben Ulm, Clare Bath, Alex Mavroidakis, Riima Daher
2020 (10th)	The Real Dirty Dancing	Seven Network	Paul Franklin, Chris Culvenor, Sophia Mogford, Sonya Wilkes
2021 (11th)
2021 (11th)	Masterchef Australia (series 13)	Network 10	Marty Benson, Adam Fergusson, Eoin Maher
2021 (11th)	The Amazing Race Australia (season 5)	Network 10	Sophia Mogford, Rikkie Proost, Evan Wilkes, Cathie Scott
2021 (11th)	Australian Survivor (Brains V Brawn)	Network 10	Keely Sonntag, Di Yang, Amelia Fisk, Adam Fergusson
2021 (11th)	The Block (Fans v Faves)	Nine Network	David Barbour, Julian Cress
2021 (11th)	Luxe Listings Sydney	Amazon Prime Video	Paul Franklin, Chris Culvenor, Rikkie Proost
2021 (11th)	The Real Housewives of Melbourne (season 5)	Fox Arena	Pip Rubira, Neil Singh & Natalie Brosnan
