= The Real Housewives of Sydney =

Australian reality television series

- Genre: Reality television
- Based on: The Real Housewives
- Presented by: Alex Perry; Joel Creasey; Osher Günsberg
- Starring: AthenaX Levendi; Krissy Marsh; Lisa Oldfield; Nicole O'Neil; Victoria Rees; Matty Samaei; Melissa Tkautz; Dr Kate Adams; Terry Biviano; Caroline Gaultier; Victoria Montano; Sally Obermeder; Martine Chippendale
- Country of origin: Australia
- Original language: English
- No. of seasons: 3
- No. of episodes: 34 (list of episodes)

Production
- Executive producers: Lisa Potasz; Kylie Washington; Natalie Brosnan; Dan Sheldon; Alison Hubert-Burns; Howard Myers
- Producers: Philippa Rubira; Samantha Martin; Jess Hawkins; Stace Hollis; Dan Rees; Laura Ritchie; Jack Langdon
- Camera setup: Multiple
- Running time: 45–56 minutes
- Production company: Matchbox Pictures

Original release
- Network: Arena
- Release: 26 February – 14 May 2017
- Network: Binge
- Release: 10 October 2023 – 6 May 2025

Related
- The Real Housewives of Melbourne; The Real Housewives of Auckland

The Real Housewives of Sydney (abbreviated RHOS) is an Australian reality television series that premiered on Arena on 26 February 2017. Developed as an international installment of the American The Real Housewives franchise and the third installment of the franchise by Matchbox Pictures, following The Real Housewives of Melbourne and The Real Housewives of Auckland. It has three seasons and focuses on the personal and professional lives of women living in Sydney, Australia.

The series was cancelled in 2019 following one season, however a revival was announced on 28 April 2023. New episodes premiered exclusively on streaming service Binge, and aired same-day on Arena.

== Overview ==
=== 2017: Original series ===
On 3 September 2014, the production company for The Real Housewives of Melbourne, Matchbox Pictures, revealed they were filming another series, in Sydney or Gold Coast. A year later in September 2015, it was again reported that Matchbox Pictures were looking into filming a new series in the aforementioned cities, along with possible candidates. On 27 February 2016, The Real Housewives of Melbourne cast member, Gamble Breaux, revealed that she was assisting the production company on looking for talent in Sydney.

The Real Housewives of Sydney was officially announced on 16 May 2016. The Real Housewives of Sydney serves as the second spin-off of The Real Housewives of Melbourne following The Real Housewives of Auckland. In July 2016, AthenaX Levendi Krissy Marsh, Lisa Oldfield, Nicole O'Neil, Matty Samaei, Melissa Tkautz, and Victoria Rees were announced as the cast members for the show's debut season. The women are described by Foxtel as "charismatic and engaging" as well as women who enjoy "the extravagant, stylish and cosmopolitan lifestyle of Sydney." This marked the first time in the history of the franchise that a series has debuted with a total of seven women. The filming for the ten-part series began filming in September, having The Real Housewives of Melbourne filming put on hold until 2017. Filming concluded on 20 December 2016. The series premiered on 26 February 2017, and featured a total of twelve episodes. On 9 January 2017, a "meet the wives" trailer was released, which featured all housewives and their profession/notability in Sydney. The reunion for season one was filmed on 26 March 2017, taking 19 hours to film.

=== 2023–2025: Rebooted series ===
On 28 April 2023, a 10-part revival of the series was announced to stream exclusively on Binge. In August 2023, Binge confirmed the cast with Marsh and O'Neil returning to the series, joined by new housewives Kate Adams, Terry Biviano, Caroline Gaultier, Victoria Montano, and Sally Obermeder. The season premiered on 10 October 2023. A reunion special was announced on 28 November 2023, with comedian Joel Creasey set as host. O'Neil was not in attendance due to a family commitment.

In February 2024, a third season was reported to be in development. On 28 April 2024, it was announced that the series had been renewed for a third season, set to air in 2024. On 17 October 2024, the Foxtel Group confirmed the third season would now premiere in 2025, with first look footage confirming the entire returning cast, joined by new housewife Martine Chippendale.

Production on the third season was interrupted multiple times. In May 2024, Marsh, O'Neill and another cast member reportedly threatened to quit, after objecting to Biviano returning to the series midway of filming. In December 2024, reports of an alleged physical altercation saw production abandon filming. Unedited rushes were subsequently sent to NBCUniversal, owner of Matchbox Pictures, following complaints from several cast members. A reunion special hosted by Osher Günsberg was filmed, with O’Neil again not in attendance, instead appearing from a remote location. The third season premiered on 25 February 2025. Jackie Gillies of The Real Housewives of Melbourne made a guest appearance during the fourth and fifth episodes, and additionally the reunion.

In May 2025, O'Neil announced her departure from the show after three seasons. In August 2025, a decision on a fourth season was still undecided by Binge. In September 2025, the series was absent from Foxtel's 2026 Upfronts slate and was not renewed for a fourth season. On 17 February 2026, Universal International Studios announced that Matchbox Pictures would cease operations in Australia. In October 2026, following the announcement that The Real Housewives of Melbourne is set for a revival in 2027, a Binge representative confirmed the series would not return for a fourth season, however the network was open to returning to the series in future.

== Cast ==
=== Timeline of cast members ===
Main cast members
Cast member	Seasons		
Cast member	1	2	3
AthenaX Levendi	Main		
Krissy Marsh	Main	Main	Main
Lisa Oldfield	Main		
Nicole O'Neil	Main	Main	Main
Victoria Rees	Main		
Matty Samaei	Main		
Melissa Tkautz	Main		
Kate Adams		Main	Main
Terry Biviano		Main	Main
Caroline Gaultier		Main	Main
Victoria Montano		Main	Main
Sally Obermeder		Main	Main
Martine Chippendale			Main

== Episodes ==
Series	Episodes	Originally released	
Series	Episodes	First released	Last released
1	12	26 February 2017	14 May 2017
2	11	10 October 2023	19 December 2023
3	11	25 February 2025	6 May 2025

== Reception ==
=== Awards and nominations ===
Award nominations for The Real Housewives of Sydney
Year	Award	Category	Program	Result
2017	Screen Producers Australia Awards	Reality Series Production of the Year	The Real Housewives of Sydney – Matchbox Pictures (Foxtel Group)	Nominated
2024	13th AACTA Awards	Best Reality Television Series	The Real Housewives of Sydney; Samantha Martin, Natalie Brosnan, Dan Sheldon – Matchbox Productions (Binge, Foxtel)	Nominated
2024	Screen Producers Australia Awards	Reality Series Production of the Year	The Real Housewives of Sydney – Matchbox Pictures (Foxtel Group)	Nominated
2025	65th TV Week Logie Awards	Best Structured Reality Program	The Real Housewives of Sydney – Matchbox Pictures (Foxtel Group/Binge)	Nominated

== Spin-offs ==
=== Australian Ultimate Girls Trip series ===
In May 2025, an Australian spin-off of The Real Housewives Ultimate Girls Trip was revealed to be in development by Matchbox Pictures. The series was set to combine cast members from both The Real Housewives of Melbourne and The Real Housewives of Sydney franchises. In August 2025, Adams expressed interest in appearing in the series.
