= The Real Housewives of Melbourne =

Australian reality television series

- Genre: Reality television
- Based on: The Real Housewives
- Presented by: Alex Perry
- Starring: Jackie Gillies; Chyka Keebaugh; Gina Liano; Andrea Moss; Janet Roach; Lydia Schiavello; Pettifleur Berenger; Gamble Breaux; Susie McLean; Venus Behbahani-Clark; Sally Bloomfield; Cherry Dipietrantonio; Simone Elliott; Kyla Kirkpatrick; Anjali Rao
- Country of origin: Australia
- Original language: English
- No. of seasons: 5
- No. of episodes: 59 (list of episodes)

Production
- Executive producers: Kylie Washington; Lisa Potasz
- Producers: Euan Jones; Virginia Hodgson; Philippa Rubira
- Production location: Melbourne
- Camera setup: Multiple
- Running time: 40–59 minutes
- Production company: Matchbox Pictures

Original release
- Network: Arena
- Release: 23 February 2014 – 21 February 2018
- Network: Fox Arena
- Release: 10 October – 12 December 2021

Related
- The Real Housewives of Sydney

The Real Housewives of Melbourne (abbreviated RHOMelbourne) is an Australian reality television series that premiered 23 February 2014 on Arena. It was developed as one of the international installments of The Real Housewives, an American television franchise. The series chronicles the lives of several women living in Melbourne, Australia.

The series originally focused on Gina Liano, Jackie Gillies, Andrea Moss, Janet Roach, Chyka Keebaugh and Lydia Schiavello; the lineup currently consists of Gillies, Roach, Gamble Breaux, Cherry Dipietrantonio, Kyla Kirkpatrick and Simone Elliott. Of the original housewives, Moss left after the first season, whilst Keebaugh departed after the third and Liano and Schiavello after the fourth. The remaining housewives joined in later seasons: Breaux in the second, Dipietrantonio, Kirkpatrick and Elliott in the fifth. Other housewives include Pettifleur Berenger (seasons 2–3), Susie McLean (season 3), Sally Bloomfield (season 4), Venus Behbahani-Clark (season 4) and Anjali Rao (season 5).

Its success allowed for the development of The Real Housewives franchise by Matchbox Pictures and similar spin-off series based in Sydney and Auckland, New Zealand.

== Overview and casting ==
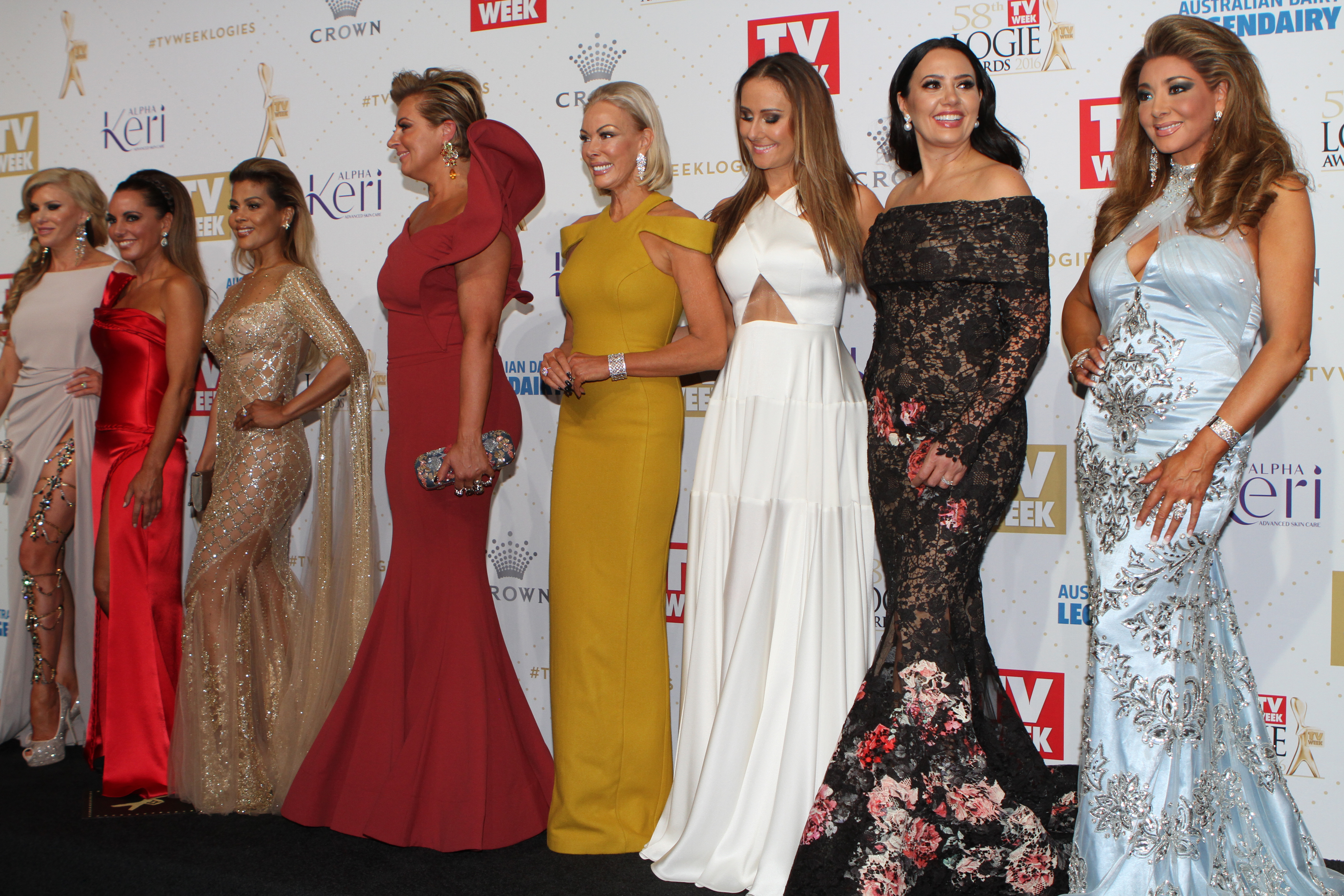
The cast at the 2016 Logie Awards

=== 2013–2017: Original run ===
The Real Housewives of Melbourne was first announced by Matchbox Pictures as The Real Housewives of Australia and was set to air in 2013. On 28 July 2013, it was announced that the series had been renamed The Real Housewives of Melbourne, along with the full cast of six women. The six women include Jackie Gillies, Chyka Keebaugh, Gina Liano, Andrea Moss, Janet Roach, and Lydia Schiavello. They were handpicked by the producers, from over one hundred women during an eight-month process. Filming for the series began in July 2013. On 21 January 2014, the official cast photo and premiere date of 23 February 2014 were announced. The series at the time was the second biggest local series launch following SoHo's Wentworth.

Moss departed the series after the first season. On 8 May 2014, the series was renewed for a second season. Brian Walsh, an executive director of Foxtel, discussed the renewal, "There is no doubt that The Real Housewives of Melbourne has been a game changer for Foxtel. The incredible reaction to our Housewives, including the blockbuster ratings, the huge social media impact and the overall buzz surrounding the series has meant the decision for another season was a very easy one." In season two, two newcomers joined the show, Gamble Breaux and Pettifleur Berenger, and premiered 22 February 2015. Manuela Pless-Bennett joined the series in a recurring capacity as a friend to Janet. Pless-Bennett was featured in interviews and attended the reunion. Friend to the wives Lisa Tonkin made more frequent guest appearances throughout the season and returned to her guest role for the second and third seasons.

The series was subsequently renewed for a third season. All the housewives returned from the previous season, along with newcomer with Susie McLean joining the cast and without Pless-Bennett. The third season premiered 21 February 2016. Prior to the conclusion of the third season, on 8 May 2016, original housewife Chyka Keebaugh confirmed that she would not be returning to the series.

On 11 May 2016, Lydia Schiavello revealed there would be a fourth season but filming may be delayed to film The Real Housewives of Sydney first. A month later in June 2016, Liano also confirmed there would be a season four and the filming delay for the Sydney series, adding that "the original girls are out of contract now. They haven't approached us to renegotiate contracts yet." In December 2016, season four was officially confirmed by Foxtel, also being reported that filming is set to begin in early 2017. On 29 April 2017, it was announced that Berenger would not return to the series. On 17 May 2017, the season 4 cast was announced, with Venus Behbahani-Clark and Sally Bloomfield joining the cast. This also confirmed the departures of Keebaugh, Berenger and McLean. However, Keebaugh did make a guest appearance during one episode in the fourth season.

=== 2019–2021: First rebooted series ===
In September 2019, Foxtel announced a fifth season, set to premiere in 2020. Foxtel Executive Brian Walsh also confirmed the upcoming fifth season would include 'a big cast shake up.' In February 2020, Bloomfield, Gillies & Behbahani-Clark announced they were departing the show, while Schiavello confirmed her return. On 19 February, the cast was released, confirming the return of Liano, Roach and Breaux, alongside the previously confirmed Schiavello, as well as the addition of Anjali Rao, Kyla Kirkpatrick and Cherry Dipietrantonio. According to cast member Janet Roach, Gillies was set to return to the show, however by deciding to leave and to start a family, she was replaced by Schiavello who wasn’t originally set to return to the series.

On 18 March 2020, Foxtel has announced that filming for season 5 had temporarily been paused due to the COVID-19 pandemic. In a statement released by Foxtel and Matchbox Pictures, “The Health and Safety of our cast and crew is our top priority”. On 11 June 2020, it was confirmed by cast member Janet Roach that filming for season 5 was to resume in July, however she announced that Foxtel had decided to push the filming dates back to January 2021.

On 14 April 2021, Foxtel re-confirmed the cast of the fifth season with Roach and Breaux reprising their roles as well as the additions of Anjali Rao, Kyla Kirkpatrick, Cherry Dipietrantonio (who all had been previously announced). Gillies (who had previously departed) also returned to the series with new addition Simone Elliott. This also confirmed the departures of Liano and Schiavello (who had been previously set to return). The fifth season premiered on 10 October 2021. Following the conclusion of the season's seventh episode, Rao departed the series after one season. An all cast reunion was not filmed for the fifth season, marking the first time in the series history to not feature a reunion.

=== 2022–present: Second rebooted series ===
In February 2022, Walsh confirmed The Real Housewives of Melbourne was “under review” with production company Matchbox Pictures. By January 2024, a sixth season was reported to be in development with a new cast. In March 2025, Gillies made a guest appearance on the third season of The Real Housewives of Sydney.

On 17 February 2026, Universal International Studios announced that Matchbox Pictures would cease operations in Australia. Five days later, casting for a new season was reported to be proceeding without Matchbox Pictures. In September 2026, Binge and Foxtel Group announced that the series would return for a sixth season in 2027. At the same time, it was announced that Liano would be returning to the franchise.

== Cast ==
=== Timeline of cast members ===
Main cast members
Cast member	Seasons				
Cast member	1	2	3	4	5
Jackie Gillies	Main	Main	Main	Main	Main
Chyka Keebaugh	Main	Main	Main	Guest	Guest
Gina Liano	Main	Main	Main	Main	
Andrea Moss	Main				
Janet Roach	Main	Main	Main	Main	Main
Lydia Schiavello	Main	Main	Main	Main	
Pettifleur Berenger		Main	Main		
Gamble Breaux		Main	Main	Main	Main
Susie McLean	Guest		Main		
Venus Behbahani-Clark				Main	
Sally Bloomfield				Main	
Cherry Dipietrantonio					Main
Simone Elliott					Main
Kyla Kirkpatrick					Main
Anjali Rao					Main
Friends of the housewives
Manuela Pless-Bennett		Friend			
Lisa Tonkin	Guest	Friend	Guest		

== Episodes ==
Series	Episodes	Originally released	
Series	Episodes	First released	Last released
1	12	23 February 2014	11 May 2014
2	13	22 February 2015	17 May 2015
3	12	21 February 2016	15 May 2016
4	12	6 December 2017	21 February 2018
5	10	10 October 2021	12 December 2021

== International broadcast ==
In the United States, the series premiered 3 August 2014, on Bravo, the same network that initiated The Real Housewives franchise. The series returned for a second season on 5 March 2015. However, unlike season one which aired during daytime on Sunday, season two aired during prime time – the first of the international The Real Housewives series to do so. In the United Kingdom, the series premiered 6 November 2014, and airs on ITVBe. In Sweden TV3 started airing the first series in early January 2016. The series returned to Bravo for a third season on 22 July 2016, but now airing during prime time on a Friday. In Canada, the series started airing on Slice in August 2016. In New Zealand, the series premiered 25 October 2016 on Bravo, the same network that initiated The Real Housewives franchise by Matchbox Pictures. On January 19, 2022, the first four seasons became available in the United States on Discovery+ with a subscription. While the first three seasons had previously aired on Bravo in the US, this marked the first time season 4 had officially premiered, albeit on a streaming service.

== Reception ==
In the United States, the premiere episode attracted 414,000 viewers, a 39% increase to the timeslot compared to the month prior. The second-season premiere, which for the first time saw the series air in primetime, grew on the prior season's premiere scoring 534,000 viewers.

=== Awards and nominations ===
Award nominations for The Real Housewives of Melbourne
Year	Type	Award	Result
2015	4th AACTA Awards	Best Editing In Television (to Paula Zorgdrager for season 1, episode 1)	Nominated
2015	ASTRA Awards	Most Outstanding Reality Program (for season 1)	Nominated
2015	5th AACTA Awards	Best Reality Television Series (for season 2)	Nominated
2016	Screen Producers Australia Awards	Reality Series Production (for season 3)	Nominated
2018	8th AACTA Awards	Best Reality Television Series (for season 4)	Nominated
2021	11th AACTA Awards	Best Reality Television Series (for season 5)	Nominated

== Spin-offs ==
=== Judge Gina ===
In September 2014, Real Housewives producer Matchbox Pictures announced that they were considering filming Real Housewives in a second location – namely Sydney or the Gold Coast. In addition, a Judge Judy-type show has been considered starring Real Housewives star Gina Liano, with a pilot episode filmed in December 2014. In September 2015, it was again reported that producer of the series, Matchbox Productions, was possibly searching for potential candidates for a The Real Housewives franchise to be based in Sydney, or the Gold Coast. On 27 February 2016 it was revealed that the producers were looking for potential cast mates in Brisbane. In June 2017, it was planned that Gina Liano would receive a Judge Judy style spin-off entitled "Judge Gina". The series was to contain 40 episodes of 30 minutes. This series didn't eventuate.

The concept was later redeveloped into a podcast with ARN Media's iHeartPodcast Network Australia in July 2023.

=== The Real Housewives of Brisbane ===
In June 2023, it was revealed that a Brisbane set series of The Real Housewives had been cast. However, the series did not move forward in favour of Matchbox Pictures reviving The Real Housewives of Sydney for a second season.

=== Australian Ultimate Girls Trip series ===
In May 2025, an Australian spin-off of The Real Housewives Ultimate Girls Trip was revealed to be in development by Matchbox Pictures. The series was set to combine cast members from both The Real Housewives of Melbourne and The Real Housewives of Sydney franchises.
