= Bettina Liano =

Australian fashion designer

- Born: 1966 (age 59–60); Melbourne, Victoria
- Occupations: Fashion designer, entrepreneur
- Known for: Fashion design
- Children: 2
- Relatives: Gina Liano (sister); Teresa Liano (sister)
- Website: www.bybettinaliano.com

Bettina Liano (born 1966) is an Italian-Australian fashion designer, creator and former owner of the "Bettina Liano" women's clothing and jeans label.

== Career ==
Liano's career in fashion started by chance in the early 1980s when Melbourne retailer Joe Silitto noticed a dress that she had made for her sister, and asked about selling the design. In 1983, Liano and her mother opened a shop, "Sempre L'Unico", in Toorak Village. The family business, which included Liano's two sisters, did well and they opened two more shops, in Chapel Street and the city.

After leaving Sempre L'Unico to start her own business, Liano, with her husband Roy Christou, launched the eponymous Bettina Liano label in 1989. Two years later they started making jeans – "spray-on-tight, hipster jeans", in contrast to the loose fitting styles of the time – which became one of her most popular items.

In 1999, Liano won a Federal Court injunction preventing Satch Clothing from selling clothes that had been made using her design in breach of copyright. She was one of the first designers in Australia to take such legal action to protect her intellectual property. She also won settlements against other stores copying of her designs.

In 2005, Liano designed a collection of clothes for young girls, sold exclusively by Myer, under the children's clothing brand Barbie.

In 2010, Liano launched a diffusion label "T by Bettina Liano", exclusive to Myer. She also won Cosmopolitan magazine's Fun Fearless Female award in the Designer category.

In 2011, the business went into administration, but in 2012 recovered after striking a licensing agreement with the Sydney-based Apparel Group. Liano retained control of the business.

At its peak, Liano had eight stores in Australia. In February 2013, Liano closed all except one of her Australian stores and opened one in SoHo, Manhattan.

In September 2013 the business again went into administration. Subsequently, the "Bettina Liano", "T by Bettina Liano" and "O Jeans" trademarks were acquired by the Apparel Group. In 2015 Liano created a new label "BYBL" ("By Bettina Liano").

== Personal life ==
Liano was born c. 1966, one of four children of Italian immigrant parents. She grew up in Brighton, Victoria.

At 23, she married Roy Christou; they have two daughters. Liano and Christou were also business partners. They later separated.

Liano is the sister of Gina Liano.
