= Chyka Keebaugh =

Australian television personality

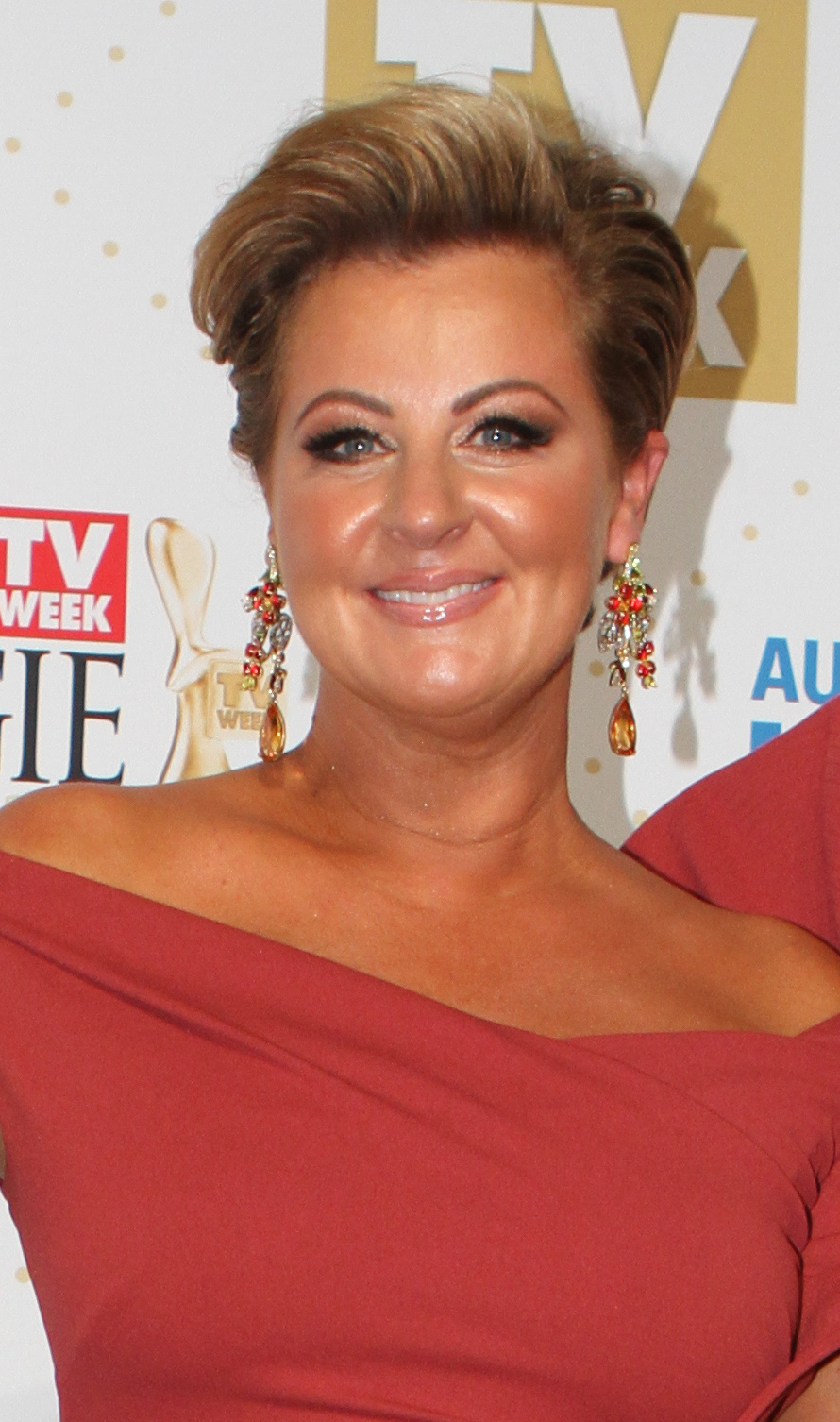
- Keebaugh in 2016
- Born: Chyka Siney; December 12, 1968 (age 57); Melbourne, Victoria
- Education: Camberwell Girls Grammar
- Occupations: Businesswoman, author, media personality
- Years active: 2014–present
- Known for: The Real Housewives of Melbourne
- Spouse: Bruce Keebaugh
- Children: 2
- Website: chyka.com

Chyka Keebaugh (née Siney; born 15 December 1968) is an Australian businesswoman, author, media and television personality. Keebaugh spent four years as the homemaking and styling expert on Good Morning Australia, and three series on The Real Housewives of Melbourne.

== Early life ==
Keebaugh was born in Melbourne, Australia and is the daughter of businessman Bruce Siney and Vannese Siney, sister to Piertra. She studied hospitality and gastronomy at Le Cordon Bleu in London and floristry at Constance Spry Floristry School.

== Career ==
In 2014, Keebaugh was cast in the Australian reality TV series The Real Housewives of Melbourne on Arena and Bravo. Fellow cast members included Jackie Gillies and Gina Liano. Keebaugh left the show in 2016 after three seasons.

Keebaugh is the author of two books published by Hardie Grant Books, Chyka Home (2018) and Chyka Celebrate (2019).
