= Brian Walsh (television executive) =

Australian media executive (1955–2023)

- Born: 20 November 1955
- Died: 16 March 2023 (aged 67); Sydney, New South Wales, Australia
- Education: University of Technology Sydney
- Occupations: Media executive and entertainment publicist
- Years active: 1978–2023
- Known for: Foxtel executive; Network Ten publicity director; Celebrity and sporting publicist; Company founder of "The Promotion Department" with artists services firm executive Steve Vizard
- Awards: Logie Hall of Fame

Brian Walsh (20 November 1955 – 16 March 2023) was an Australian media executive and publicist. Walsh was best known for his lengthy tenure as the executive director of television at Foxtel and for his work as a sports and entertainment publicist.

== Life and career ==
Walsh was born on 20 November 1955, and commenced his career in 1978, after he graduated from the University of Technology Sydney with a Bachelor of Communications. he worked for David Elfick Palm Beach Pictures

Walsh had an extensive career in Australia and overseas. He worked for 2SM, Network 10, Star TV in Hong Kong and BSkyB in the United Kingdom.

Walsh then joined 2SM as the station's promotions manager where he stayed for five years.

== Early career at Network 10 and Network Nine ==
Walsh then moved into television commencing work at Network 10.

As Network 10's publicity director, Walsh is credited with helping the evening soap Neighbours achieve success after it was axed by the Seven Network in 1985 due to poor viewership in Sydney, despite the show's solid ratings in Melbourne and Brisbane.

In an attempt to overcome the show's poor performance in Sydney, Walsh helped create the successful "Nominate Your Neighbour" campaign in which Sydneysiders were invited to nominate fellow locals for their inspiring neighbourliness. The Melbourne-based Neighbours actors then flew to Sydney to deliver brand new television sets to the winners. The campaign was credited with helping the ratings in Sydney immediately increase.

During his time at Network 10, Walsh is also credited with launching successful miniseries Vietnam, Bangkok Hilton and The Dirtwater Dynasty.

Walsh left Network 10 in June 1989.

In 1993, Walsh was hired by the Nine Network in an attempt to increase the ratings for their evening soap Paradise Beach.

== Foxtel executive ==
In 1995, Walsh was part of the foundation executive team at pay television company Foxtel when it was launched in Australia in 1995, appointed the company's executive director of television.

He was vehemently opposed to Foxtel merging with Optus Vision and spoke against suggestions the two companies should merge, stating: "As long as I draw breath, there will never be a merger between Foxtel and Optus Vision. The only reason companies merge is when both parties have something to offer the other. Optus Vision has nothing to offer Foxtel Group. Optus Vision is losing the pay-TV race and I think this merger is wishful thinking on their part."

In June 2022, Walsh was named as Foxtel's executive director of drama which entailed overseeing commissioned drama on both Binge and Foxtel.

Walsh is credited with commissioning much of Foxtel's original content such as Love My Way, Slide, Satisfaction, Australia's Next Top Model, Tangle, Selling Houses Australia, Spirited, The Great Australian Bake Off, The Real Housewives of Melbourne, Gogglebox Australia, A Place to Call Home, Secret City, Wentworth, Upright, Deadline Gallipoli, The Kettering Incident, The End, Love Me, Colin From Accounts and The Twelve.

In 2015, his work at Foxtel was recognised when he received the Industry Contribution Award at the Australian Subscription Television and Radio Association's ASTRA Awards - a one off award which was presented as part of the 20th anniversary of subscription television in Australia.

Walsh's last two commissioned series for Foxtel were Strife, and High Country.

== Publicity officer ==
Walsh founded promotions and publicity company The Promotions Department with Steve Vizard's company Artist Services in 1989, with Planet Hollywood and Triple M being among his high-profile clients.

As a sports publicist, Walsh coordinated the successful Simply the Best campaign for the New South Wales Rugby League premiership which featured American singer Tina Turner. He also is credited with staging the grand final entertainment for State of Origin games and rugby league grand finals including the 1989 NSWRL grand final.

Walsh was personally appointed by Barbra Streisand for her 2000 Australian concert tour. He was also the publicist for concerts by Mariah Carey, Neil Diamond, Michael Jackson and Ricky Martin.

As publicist for Jackson's 1996 Australian tour, Walsh was tasked with announcing Jackson's secret marriage to Debbie Rowe. Walsh made the announcement in the Sheraton on the Park hotel in Sydney after initially being told there was to be a media conference, but was instead told by Jackson's personal security to make the announcement about his marriage to Rowe.

Speaking in 2000 about being relatively unknown outside the industry, Walsh stated: "I'm a big believer that it's the clients which should get all the attention. The biggest mistake you can make in this game is when you think you're bigger than the act."

== Death and tributes ==
Walsh died in Sydney on 16 March 2023, at the age of 67.

His death prompted tributes from Foxtel, Paramount, Screen Australia, Media, Entertainment and Arts Alliance, and the Australian Writers' Guild.

Tributes to Walsh were also made on social media by a large number of Australian public figures including Steve Bastoni, Angela Bishop, Tony Burke, David Campbell, Danny Clayton, Peter Ford, Ben Fordham, Deborra-Lee Furness, Anita Jacoby, Yvie Jones, Prue MacSween, Tim Minchin, Guy Pearce, Richard Wilkins, and Jim Wilson.

On 17 October 2025, stars gathered in Sydney for the premiere of The Great Entertainer a documentary that showed Walsh's legacy for his work at Foxtel and the industry.

== Honours ==
Walsh is the 2023 inductee into the annual Logie Hall of Fame.

In November 2023, AACTA announced the Brian Walsh Award for Emerging Talent.

== Filmography ==
Notable Credits
Year	Title	Role	Notes
2024	High Country	Exec Producer/Executive Director TV	Final commissioned series
2023	Strife	Exec Producer/Executive Director TV	6 episodes
2022	Colin from Accounts	Exec Producer/Executive Director TV	8 episodes
2022	The Twelve (Australian TV series)	Exec Producer/Executive Director TV	10 episodes
2021-23	Love Me (Australian TV series)	Exec Producer/Executive Director TV	12 episodes
2019-22	Upright (TV series)	Exec Producer/Executive Director TV	16 episodes
2013-2021	Wentworth (TV series)	Exec Producer/Executive Director TV	100 episodes
2016-18	A Place to Call Home (TV series)	Exec Producer/Executive Director TV	33 episodes
2021	Wentworth Unlocked	Exec Producer/Executive Director TV	Special
2021	Wentworth Reunion Event	Exec Producer/Executive Director TV	Special
2020	The End	Exec Producer/Executive Director TV	10 episodes
2016-19	Secret City (TV series)	Exec Producer/Executive Director TV	11 episodes
2009-12	Tangle	Exec Producer/Executive Director TV	22 episodes
1987	Vietnam		10 episodes
198?	Neighbours	Publicist	
