= Pettifleur Berenger =

Australian author and reality television personality

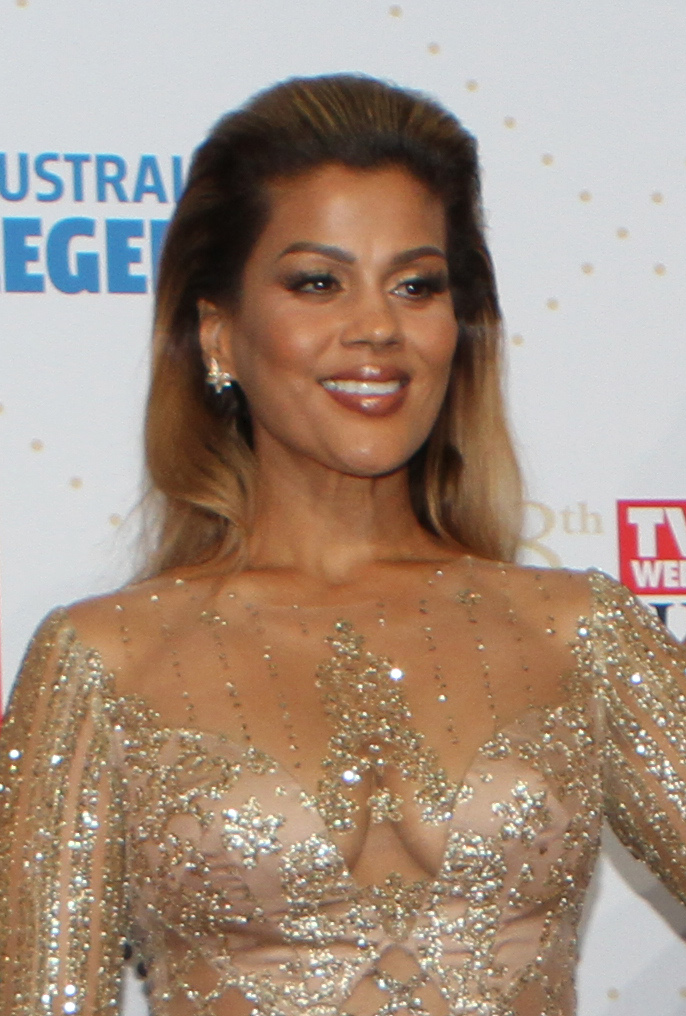
- Berenger in 2016
- Born: 20 December 1964 (age 61); Colombo, Dominion of Ceylon (now Sri Lanka)
- Occupation: Author
- Website: pettifleur.com

Pettifleur Berenger (born 20 December 1964) is an Australian author of Sri Lankan / Ceylonese Dutch Burgher descent.

== Career ==
She released her first book, Switch the Bitch, in April 2015.

She appeared on The Real Housewives of Melbourne in its second and third seasons.

Berenger appeared as a contestant on Hell's Kitchen Australia, which premiered in 2017. She finished in ninth place, being the second one eliminated.

In January 2021, Berenger was a contestant in the Australian version of I'm a Celebrity...Get Me Out of Here!, where she was eliminated second.
