= Arena (TV channel) =

- Country: Australia

Programming
- Language: English
- Picture format: 576i (SDTV 16:9); 1080i (HDTV 16:9)
- Timeshift service: Arena +2

Ownership
- Owner: Foxtel Networks
- Sister channels: Foxtel Networks channels

History
- Launched: 22 April 1995
- Former names: Arena (1995–2020, 2023–present); Fox Arena (2020–2023)

Availability

Streaming media
- Foxtel Go: Channel 111
- Binge: binge.com.au

Arena (formerly Fox Arena) is an Australian general entertainment cable and satellite channel available on Foxtel, and Optus Television's subscription platforms.

== History ==
In the late 1990s, Arena had the slogan "The Art of Television". It ran a mix of programs, including UK serial Coronation Street, and cult horror and science fictions films presented by Tabitha Clutterbuck. This included programs from E! prior to the launch of E! in Australia.

On 1 March 2001, it relaunched, with an added focus on talk shows and celebrities.

2005 logo

On 31 July 2005, its look was again updated, with a new logo and the new slogan, "Great TV Any time".

It was owned and operated by XYZnetworks until 1 October 2007, when management and programming were taken over by Foxtel, with XYZ Networks still retaining ownership.

2008-2020 Logo

In April 2008, Foxtel announced a partnership with Universal Networks International, where Arena would be re-branded as an Australian version of the American channel Bravo—featuring original series from the network, and adopting a variation of Bravo's branding and slogan, whilst retaining the previous Arena name.

On 1 June 2010, Arena TV switched from standard 4:3 to 16:9 widescreen programming. Many of Arena's programmes like Gilmore Girls, Two and a Half Men, How I Met Your Mother and One Tree Hill amongst other shows are originally presented in widescreen. Arena TV's switch to widescreen is part of Foxtel's plan to have every channel in widescreen by the end of 2010.

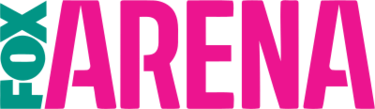
2020-2023 logo

On 3 November 2014, Arena launched a HD feed. In addition, Arena + 2 moved from channel 154 to channel 151.

On 1 July 2020, the channel rebranded as FOX Arena with a new logo and tagline ‘Live Out Loud.’ The channel now operates as part of Foxtel's LifeStyle suite of television networks.

On 28 September 2023, the channel rebranded to its former name, "Arena", with a new logo.

== Slogans ==
Slogan	Year(s)
The Art of Television	1995–2001
Get Into It	2001–2005
Great TV Any Time	2005–2008
Watch What Happens	2008–2020
Live Out Loud	2020–present

== Programming ==
=== Current syndicated programming ===
- Below Deck
- Dexter: Original Sin
- Divorce Court
- The Drew Barrymore Show
- Entertainment Tonight
- Hot Bench
- Jeopardy!
- Million Dollar Listing Los Angeles
- Project Runway
- The Real Housewives of Atlanta
- The Real Housewives of Beverly Hills
- The Real Housewives of Cheshire
- The Real Housewives of Melbourne
- The Real Housewives of New Jersey
- The Real Housewives of New York City
- The Real Housewives of Orange County
- The Real Housewives of Potomac
- The Real Housewives of Sydney
- Shortland Street
- TMZ on TV
- Top Chef
- Vanderpump Rules
- Vanderpump Villa
- Wheel of Fortune

=== Former original programming ===
- Kate & Julia (2001–2016)
- A Day in the Life (2002–2015)
- Confidential (2007 on FOX8, 2008 on Arena)
- Erotic Star (2007–2017)
- Park Street) (2011)
- Project Runway Australia (2008–2012)
- WAG Nation (2012)
- The Real Housewives of Melbourne (2014–2021)
- The Real Housewives of Sydney (2017, 2023–2025)

=== Former syndicated programming ===
- 2 Broke Girls
- 24 Hour Catwalk
- 99 - 1
- Alias
- All Saints
- The Amazing Race
- America's Next Top Model
- The Anna Nicole Show
- Auf Wiedersehen, Pet
- The Bachelor
- Bethenny
- Bethenny Getting Married
- Bridezillas
- Brookside
- Burn Notice
- Celebrity Apprentice
- Celebrity Name Game
- Chef Academy
- Coronation Street
- The Critic
- Days of Our Lives (2014–2020, now on 10 and 10Play)
- Defying Gravity
- Desperate Housewives
- Don't Trust the B— in Apartment 23
- Double Exposure
- The Dr. Oz Show
- Drop Dead Diva
- The Drew Carey Show
- Dukes of Melrose
- Duty Free
- The Ellen DeGeneres Show
- ER
- Entourage
- Everwood
- The Fairly OddParents!
- Flipping Out
- Friends
- Ghost Whisperer
- Gilmore Girls
- Go Girls
- Grey's Anatomy
- The Guardian
- Hey Paula
- Hill Street Blues
- Hitched
- Hope & Faith
- How I Met Your Mother
- I Dream of NeNe: The Wedding
- The Insider
- In Loving Memory
- It's a Brad, Brad World
- Jerry Springer
- Joan of Arcadia
- Judge Judy
- Kathy Griffin: My Life on the D-List
- Katie
- Kids in the Hall
- King Leek
- The L Word
- The Late Show with David Letterman
- Latin Grammy Awards 2000
- Las Vegas
- Lie to Me
- Louie Spence's Showbusiness
- Louis Theroux's Weird Weekends
- Make Me a Supermodel
- Malcolm in the Middle
- Maniac Mansion
- The Manageress
- Marriage Boot Camp
- The Maury Povich Show
- Melrose Place
- Mike & Molly
- Million Dollar Listing New York
- The Millionaire Matchmaker
- Mob Wives
- Mob Wives Chicago
- The Nate Berkus Show
- Neon Rider
- The New Adventures of Old Christine
- The New Atlanta
- The New Normal
- Nip/Tuck
- NYC Prep
- The Oblongs
- The O.C.
- One Tree Hill
- Outrageous Fortune
- Outside Edge
- Paul Merton in Galton & Simpson's
- The People's Court
- Police Rescue
- The Price Is Right (US version)
- Property Envy
- Queer Eye For The Straight Guy
- The Rachel Zoe Project
- The Real Housewives of Auckland
- The Real Housewives of D.C.
- The Real Housewives of Dallas
- The Real Housewives of Miami
- The Real Housewives of Vancouver
- Reba
- Rhoda
- Rita Rocks
- Road to Avonlea
- Robin of Sherwood
- Saturday Night Live
- Saving Hope
- The Secret Cabaret
- Secret Diary of a Call Girl
- Sex and the City
- Shahs of Sunset
- Shear Genius
- The Simple Life: Interns
- Six Feet Under
- The Sopranos
- Sorrell and Son
- Styled by June
- St. Elsewhere
- Suburgatory
- Super Dave
- Tabatha's Salon Takeover
- Tamra's OC Wedding
- Thintervention with Jackie Warner
- Tim Gunn's Guide To Style
- Top Chef: Just Desserts
- Top Chef Masters
- Top Design
- Tori & Dean: Home Sweet Hollywood
- Tru Calling
- True Tori
- Two and a Half Men
- The Tyra Banks Show
- Ugly Betty
- The Unit
- Urban Angel
- Valley of the Dolls
- The View
- Wahlburgers
- Weeds
- The West Wing
- Wheel of Fortune
- Will and Grace
- The Wire (moved from Fox8/Fox Arena)
- Winners and Losers
- Winston Churchill: The Wilderness Years
- Without a Trace
- Work Out
- The Young and the Restless (2014–2020, now on Foxtel One)
