= Jackie Gillies =

Australian psychic and reality television personality

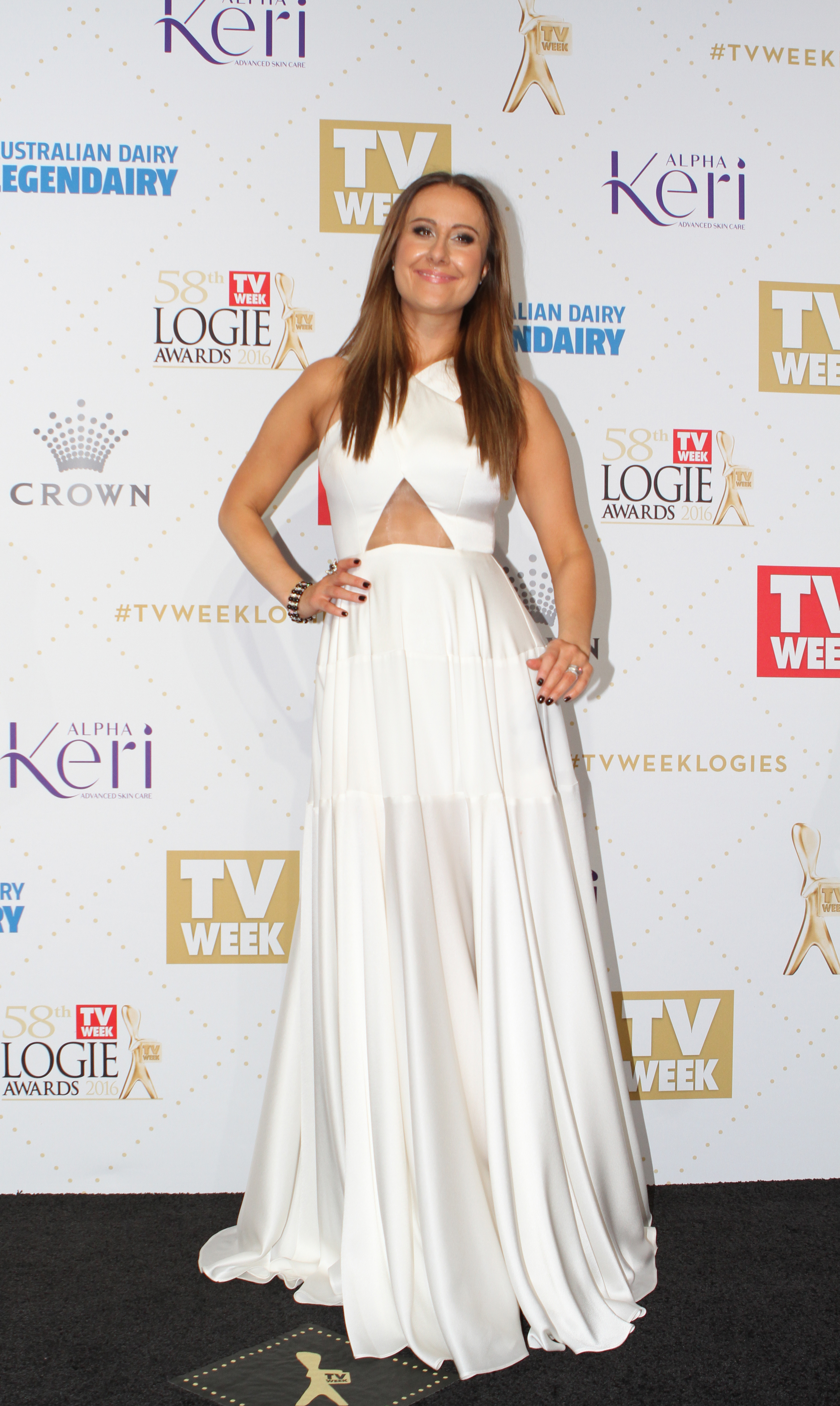
- Gillies in 2016
- Born: Jakica Ivančević; 11 June 1980 (age 46); Split, SR Croatia, SFR Yugoslavia
- Occupation: Psychic
- Known for: The Real Housewives of Melbourne
- Spouse: Ben Gillies (m. 2010)
- Children: 2
- Website: xojackie.com

Jakica Gillies (née Ivančević, [ˈjaːkit͡sa iˈʋaːnt͡ʃeʋit͡ɕ]; born 11 June 1980) is an Australian psychic and reality television personality, best known for being on The Real Housewives of Melbourne.

== Career ==
Gillies works as a professional psychic and is best known for her role in The Real Housewives of Melbourne, where she is featured as an original housewife. Previously, she worked in corporate banking as a casual relief teller but left her job to become a full-time psychic medium.

In January 2018, Gillies was revealed as a celebrity contestant on the fourth season of the Australian version of I'm a Celebrity...Get Me Out of Here!. On 6 March 2018, she was evicted after 39 days in the jungle, finishing in 7th place.

In 2023, Gilles and Ben Gilles competed on the seventh season of The Amazing Race Australia.

== Personal life ==
Gillies was born in Croatia and her family emigrated to Australia when she was a few weeks old . The family still has property in Croatia. She spent her childhood and early adult life in Newcastle, but now resides in Melbourne.

Gillies married Silverchair drummer Ben Gillies in 2010.

After many failed IVF attempts, Jackie gave birth to twins on 15 October 2021 through a successful IVF procedure.
