= The Real Housewives Ultimate Girls Trip: South Africa =

Reality Television series

- Genre: Reality
- Based on: The Real Housewives Ultimate Girls Trip
- Starring: Nonkanyiso "LaConco" Conco; Christall Kay; Lethabo Lejoy Mathatho; Liz Prins; Beverly Steyn; Melany "Mel" Viljoen; Nonkululeko "Nonku" Williams; Londiwe "Londie London" Zulu
- Country of origin: South Africa
- Original language: English
- No. of seasons: 1
- No. of episodes: 10

Production
- Production location: Jamaica
- Camera setup: Multi-camera
- Production company: GOAT Productions

Original release
- Network: Showmax
- Release: 27 May 2024 – present

Related
- The Real Housewives Ultimate Girls Trip: Africa

The Real Housewives Ultimate Girls Trip: South Africa, abbreviated RHUGTSA, is a South African reality television series that premiered May 27, 2024, on Showmax.

Developed as the first international installment of The Real Housewives Ultimate Girls Trip, the series unites several women from the South African Real Housewives franchises as they vacation together.

A second Ultimate series, The Real Housewives Ultimate Girls Trip: Africa was announced in October 2025 and brings together cast members from the South African entries, as well as women from both the Kenyan and Nigerian installments of the franchise.

== Overview ==
On March 28, 2024, a South African iteration of The Real Housewives Ultimate Girls Trip was announced by Showmax. The series follows multiple women from different South African Real Housewives installments living together while on vacation.

The series was filmed in Jamaica. The cast consists of Nonkanyiso "LaConco" Conco, Christall Kay, Lethabo Lejoy Mathatho, Liz Prins, Beverly Steyn, Melany "Mel" Viljoen, Nonkululeko "Nonku" Williams, and Londiwe "Londie London" Zulu. The season premiered on May 27, 2024.

== Cast ==
=== Timeline of cast members ===
Main cast members
Cast member	Franchise	Seasons
Cast member	Franchise	1
Nonkanyiso "LaConco" Conco	Durban	Main
Christall Kay	Johannesburg	Main
Lethabo LeJoy Mathatho	Johannesburg	Main
Liz Prins	Gqeberha	Main
Beverly Steyn	Cape Town	Main
Melany "Mel" Viljoen	Pretoria	Main
Nonkululeko "Nonku" Williams	Durban	Main
Londiwe "Londie London" Zulu	Durban	Main

== Episodes ==
The Real Housewives Ultimate Girls Trip: South Africa season 1 episodes
No.	Title	Original release date
1	"Welcome to Jamaica Man!"	May 27, 2024
Eight housewives are getting ready for the ultimate girl's trip to the island paradise of Jamaica. Their gracious host prepare to give them the experience of a lifetime.
2	"Not a Scammer"	June 3, 2024
Mel presents the ladies with a file of evidence defending her recent involvement in an international business scandal. Liz sends a compliment in Christall's direction, but it's not well received.
3	"Britney Spears"	June 10, 2024
Christall ignites the town with her ambitious dance moves and distinctive singing voice. Nonku meets a captivating gentleman. Bev and Mel decide to engage in a private conversation.
4	"What's in the Bag?"	June 17, 2024
Nonku questions the labels attached to her. Liz confronts Mel about her condescending attitude. Meanwhile, Bev is nosy about the contents of Mel's tag-a-long Gucci bag.
5	"Roll a Spliff"	June 24, 2024
The ladies are soaking in the Jamaican sun, but even the sweetest breeze can't stop small grudges from growling. Perhaps a visit to a Jamaican cannabis farm is just what the ladies need to set aside their differences.
6	"Let's Play a Game"	July 1, 2024
Liz surprises the girls with a titillating activity that has Nonku and Lethabo brimming with excitement. Mel suspects ulterior motives when coerced to divulge more about the dynamics of her marriage.
7	"Whatever Floats Your Boat!"	July 8, 2024
The excitement continues as the ladies dive into more adventures and unexpected encounters. Nonku finally embarks on her long-awaited date, adding to the island's romantic atmosphere.
8	"Black & White"	July 15, 2024
LeJoy and Laconco are happy to bring Londie up to speed with everything she's missed so far. Mel betrays Bev's confidence by revealing a shocking comment she made about Liz, who is left in complete disbelief.
9	"Where Were You?"	July 22, 2024
Londie Goes Horseriding With Mel & Christall. Nonku Wants To Know Why Londie Arrived Late In Jamaica. Christall Shares Her Rendition Of Bob Marley's One Love.
10	"From Me and My Team"	July 29, 2024
Will Londie eventually give Nonku the answer to the visa question? With only a few hours left on this spectacular trip, Lethabo checks in on Bev. Alton bids the ladies farewell.
