= The Real Housewives Ultimate Girls Trip: Africa =

Reality Television series

- Genre: Reality
- Based on: The Real Housewives Ultimate Girls Trip
- Presented by: MaBlerh
- Starring: Princess Jecoco; Christall Kay; Dr. Catherine Masitsa; Evodia "Madame" Mogase; Annie Mthembu; Angel Ndlela; Zena Nyambu; Jojo Robinson; Mariam Timmer
- Country of origin: South Africa
- Original language: English
- No. of seasons: 1
- No. of episodes: 12

Production
- Production location: Brazil
- Camera setup: Multi-camera
- Production company: GOAT Productions

Original release
- Network: Showmax; Mzansi Magic
- Release: 28 November 2025 – present

Related
- The Real Housewives Ultimate Girls Trip: South Africa

The Real Housewives Ultimate Girls Trip: Africa, abbreviated RHUGTA, is a South African reality television series that premiered on November 28, 2025, on Showmax.

Announced as the second international installment of The Real Housewives Ultimate Girls Trip, the series unites several women from the African Real Housewives franchises as they vacation together.

== Overview ==
On March 28, 2024, a South African iteration of The Real Housewives Ultimate Girls Trip was announced by Showmax. The series followed multiple women from different South African Real Housewives installments living together while on vacation in Jamaica.

In October 2025, Showmax announced a second Ultimate series that would bring together cast members from the South African entries, as well as include women from both the Kenyan and Nigerian installments of the franchise.

The series was filmed in Brazil. The cast consists of Princess Jecoco, Christall Kay, Dr. Catherine Masitsa, Evodia "Madame" Mogase, Annie Mthembu, Angel Ndlela, Zena Nyambu, Jojo Robinson, and Mariam Timmer. The series premiered on November 28, 2025.

== Cast ==
=== Timeline of cast members ===
Main cast members
Cast member	Franchise	Seasons
Cast member	Franchise	1
Princess Jecoco	Abuja	Main
Christall Kay	Johannesburg	Main
Dr. Catherine Masitsa	Nairobi	Main
Evodia "Madame" Mogase	Johannesburg	Main
Annie Mthembu	Durban	Main
Angel Ndlela	Durban	Main
Zena Nyambu	Nairobi	Main
Jojo Robinson	Durban	Main
Mariam Timmer	Lagos	Main

== Episodes ==
The Real Housewives Ultimate Girls Trip: Africa season 1 episodes
No.	Title	Original release date
1	"Welcome to Rio"	November 28, 2025
2	"Shades, Secrets & Caipirinhas"	December 5, 2025
3	"Receipts, Rumours & Reality Checks"	December 12, 2025
4	"A Surprise Guest"	December 19, 2025
5	"Truth, Tears & Therapy"	December 26, 2025
6	"Jungle Heat"	January 2, 2026
7	"Rollerblades & Red Flags"	January 9, 2026
8	"Itchy Secrets & Samba Nights"	January 16, 2026
9	"Apologies & Aftershocks"	January 22, 2026
10	"Redemption in Rio"	January 29, 2026
11	"Reunion Part 1"	February 20, 2026
12	"Reunion Part 2"	February 27, 2026
