= The Real Housewives of Gqeberha =

- Genre: Reality television
- Based on: The Real Housewives
- Starring: Unathi Faku; Ashleigh Mather; Buli G Ngomane; Norma Nicol; Liz Prins
- Country of origin: South Africa
- Original language: English
- No. of seasons: 1
- No. of episodes: 14

Production
- Production locations: Gqeberha, Eastern Cape, South Africa
- Production company: GOAT Originals Productions

Original release
- Network: 1Magic
- Release: 3 February 2023 – present

The Real Housewives of Gqeberha, often abbreviated as RHOGQ, is a South African reality television series. Developed as an international installment of the Real Housewives franchise, it documents the personal and professional lives of several women residing in Gqeberha, South Africa. The show premiered on 03 February 2023.

This franchise is the 5th franchise in South Africa after: Johannesburg, Durban and Cape Town in English and Pretoria in Afrikaans. This is the 18th international installment in The Real Housewives franchise and 6th in Africa alone.

The first and most recent season consisted of: Unathi Faku, Ashleigh Mather, Buli G Ngomane, Norma Nicol and Liz Prins as main cast members.

The series aired on 1Magic in South Africa and can be streamed on Showmax in Africa.

== Cast ==
- Unathi Faku
- Ashleigh Mather
- Buli G Ngomane
- Norma Nicol
- Liz Prins

== Episodes ==
Unathi Faku, Ashleigh Mather, Buli G Ngomane, Norma Nicol and Liz Prins are introduced as series regulars.

No.	Title	Original release date
1	"Episode 1"	3 February 2023
2	"Episode 2"	10 February 2023
3	"Episode 3"	17 February 2023
4	"Episode 4"	24 February 2023
5	"Episode 5"	3 March 2023
6	"Episode 6"	10 March 2023
7	"Episode 7"	17 March 2023
8	"Episode 8"	24 March 2023
9	"Episode 9"	31 March 2023
10	"Episode 10"	7 April 2023
11	"Episode 11"	14 April 2023
12	"Episode 12"	21 April 2023
13	"Episode 13"	28 April 2023
14	"Episode 14"	5 May 2023
