= The Real Housewives of Naples =

Italian reality television series

- The Real Housewives di Napoli
- Genre: Reality television
- Based on: The Real Housewives
- Starring: Daniela Sabella; Maria Consiglio Visco Marigliano del Monte; Noemi Letizia; Raffaella Siervo; Simonetta De Luca; Stella Giannicola; Alessandra Parlato; Januaria Piromallo
- Country of origin: Italy
- Original language: Italian
- No. of seasons: 2
- No. of episodes: 20

Production
- Production locations: Naples, Italy
- Production company: FTM Entertainment

Original release
- Network: DPlay Plus (Note: Season 1 Streaming Telecast); Real Time (Note: TV Telecast); Discovery+ (Note: Season 2 Streaming Telecast)
- Release: 29 November 2019 – 10 October 2021

The Real Housewives of Naples (Italian: The Real Housewives di Napoli) is an Italian reality television series. Developed as an international installment of the Real Housewives franchise, it documents the personal and professional lives of several women residing in Naples, Italy.

This series was the first in the Real Housewives franchise in Italy, with a second franchise in Italy being The Real Housewives di Roma. It was the eleventh international installment in the franchise and the fifth in Europe.

The second and final season on the series consisted of: Maria Consiglio Visco Marigliano del Monte, Simonetta De Luca, Stella Giannicola, Alessandra Parlato, Januaria Piromallo, Daniela Sabella and Raffaella Siervo as main cast members. For the first season, the cast consisted of: Consiglio Visco Marigliano del Monte, De Luca, Giannicola, Sabella, Siervo and Noemi Letizia.

The first season was first aired as streaming telecast on DPlay Plus, with a second airing as a TV telecast on Real Time. For Season 2, the show was moved to the Italian version of Discovery+ for the streaming telecast. Season 2 as a TV telecast was aired on Real Time like the first season of the series.

== Cast ==
Main cast members
Cast member	Seasons	
Cast member	1	2
Daniela Sabella	Main	Main
Maria Consiglio Visco Marigliano del Monte	Main	Main
Noemi Letizia	Main	
Raffaella Siervo	Main	Main
Simonetta De Luca	Main	Main
Stella Giannicola	Main	Main
Alessandra Parlato		Main
Januaria Piromallo		Main

== Episodes ==
Series	Episodes	Originally released	
Series	Episodes	First released	Last released
1	10	29 November 2019	29 November 2019
2	10	9 April 2021	10 October 2021

=== Season 1 (2019–2020) ===
Maria Consiglio Visco Marigliano del Monte, Simonetta De Luca, Stella Giannicola, Noemi Letizia, Daniela Sabella and Raffaella Siervo are introduced as series regulars.

No. overall	No. in season	Title	Original release date	Viewers (millions)
1	1	"Le protagoniste"	29 November 2019 (DPlay Plus); 24 January 2020 (Real Time)	N/A
2	2	"Tra Grasse ed Ercolano"	29 November 2019 (DPlay Plus); 31 January 2020 (Real Time)	N/A
3	3	"Limitless"	29 November 2019 (DPlay Plus); 7 February 2020 (Real Time)	N/A
4	4	"Vita a Napoli"	29 November 2019 (DPlay Plus); 14 February 2020 (Real Time)	N/A
5	5	"Tra party e filler"	29 November 2019 (DPlay Plus); 21 February 2020 (Real Time)	N/A
6	6	"C'è una talpa?"	29 November 2019 (DPlay Plus); 28 February 2020 (Real Time)	N/A
7	7	"Tra botox e party"	29 November 2019 (DPlay Plus); 6 March 2020 (Real Time)	N/A
8	8	"Amiche nemiche"	29 November 2019 (DPlay Plus); 13 March 2020 (Real Time)	N/A
9	9	"M'ama o non m'ama"	29 November 2019 (DPlay Plus); 20 March 2020 (Real Time)	N/A
10	10	"La verità sulla talpa"	29 November 2019 (DPlay Plus); 27 March 2020 (Real Time)	N/A

=== Season 2 (2021) ===
Noemi Letizia departed as a series regular. Alessandra Parlato and Januaria Piromallo joined the cast as series regulars.

No. overall	No. in season	Title	Original release date	Viewers (millions)
11	1	"Di nuovo amiche"	8 April 2021	N/A
12	2	"Nuove protagoniste"	15 April 2021	N/A
13	3	"Eventi speciali"	22 April 2021	N/A
14	4	"Maternità"	29 April 2021	N/A
15	5	"Sorprese in arrivo"	6 May 2021	N/A
16	6	"Fuga da Napoli"	10 September 2021	N/A
17	7	"La Dolce Vita"	19 September 2021	N/A
18	8	"Nemiche per la pelle"	26 September 2021	N/A
19	9	"Mamme alla riscossa"	2 October 2021	N/A
20	10	"La resa dei conti"	10 October 2021	N/A
