= Uthando Nes'thembu =

South African reality television series

- Genre: Reality television
- Starring: Mseleku family
- Country of origin: South Africa
- Original language: Zulu
- No. of seasons: 9

Production
- Production locations: KwaZulu-Natal, South Africa
- Running time: 24 min

Original release
- Network: Mzansi Magic
- Release: May 19, 2017 – present

Uthando neS'thembu (transl. Love and Polygamy) is a South African reality television series on Mzansi Magic that follows the polygamous family of businessman Musa Mseleku and his five wives, MaCele, MaYeni, MaKhumalo, MaNgwabe and MaKhwela.

Musa also hosts Mnakwethu, a show about men asking their wives for permission to take a second a wife. There's a talk show with the Mseleku wives on SABC 1 called Igumbi Lamakhosikazi. MaCele and MaKhumalo have a relationship advice show, Ezomshado. The older children appear on the spin-off show Izingane zeS'thembu. MaKhumalo also appears on the show The Real Housewives of Durban.

== Family ==
Musa Mseleku has 11 children: 3 with MaCele, 3 with MaYeni, 2 with MaNgwabe, and 2 with other women.

1. Busisiwe "MaCele" Mseleku, married in 2002, mother of Lwandle, Abongwe, and Owami, raising stepdaughter Snenhlanhla "Sne"
2. Nokukhanya "MaYeni" Mseleku, married in 2007, mother of Mpumelelo, Mnini, and Obanzi
3. Thobile "MaKhumalo" Mseleku, married in 2009, raising stepdaughter Mpilonhle "Mpilo"
4. Mbali "MaNgwabe" Mseleku, married in 2009, mother of Mawande and Zenande
5. Samke "MaKhwela" Mseleku, married in 2024, mother of Methuli

There was another wife, MaSaule, who died in a car crash before the show.

== See also ==
- Polygamy in South Africa
- Sister Wives, an American reality TV show about a Mormon polygamous family.
