= The Real Housewives of Rome =

- The Real Housewives di Roma
- Genre: Reality television
- Based on: The Real Housewives
- Starring: Camilla Ancilotto; Teresa Bolegnese; Vanessa Ciampa; Flora Pellino; Nicoletta Ricca Benedetti; Anadela Serra Visconti
- Country of origin: Italy
- Original language: Italian
- No. of seasons: 1
- No. of episodes: 5

Production
- Production locations: Rome, Italy
- Production company: FTM Entertainment

Original release
- Network: Real Time (Note: TV Telecast); Discovery+ (Note: Streaming Telecast)
- Release: 1 May – 22 May 2024

The Real Housewives of Rome (Italian: The Real Housewives di Roma) is an Italian reality television series. Developed as an international installment of the Real Housewives franchise, it documents the personal and professional lives of several women residing in Rome, Italy.

This franchise is the second franchise in Italy, with the first franchise in Italy being The Real Housewives di Napoli. This is the 25th international installment in The Real Housewives franchise and 12th in Europe.

The first and most recent season consisted of: Camilla Ancilotto, Teresa Bolegnese, Vanessa Ciampa, Flora Pellino, Nicoletta Ricca Benedetti and Anadela Serra Visconti as main cast members.

The series' first two episodes dropped as a preview of the show on the Italian version of Discovery+ on 24 April 2024, before those same two episodes then aired on Real Time on 1 May 2024. The show then aired on both Real Time and Discovery+ Italy weekly after that.

== Cast ==
- Camilla Ancilotto
- Teresa Bolegnese
- Vanessa Ciampa
- Flora Pellino
- Nicoletta Ricca Benedetti
- Anadela Serra Visconti

== Episodes ==
No.	Title	Original release date
1	"Protagoniste"	24 April 2024 (Discovery+); 1 May 2024 (Real Time)
2	"La tensione si taglia con un grissino"	24 April 2024 (Discovery+); 1 May 2024 (Real Time)
3	"Tanti auguri!"	8 May 2024
4	"Fuori città"	15 May 2024
5	"Pace o guerra?"	22 May 2024
