= The Real Housewives =

American reality television franchise

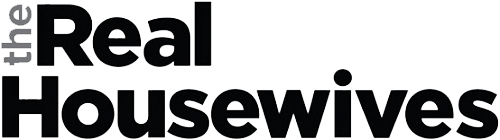
- Created by: Scott Dunlop
- Original work: The Real Housewives of Orange County
- Years: 2006–present
- Based on: Desperate Housewives

Films and television
- Television series: Orange County; New York City; Atlanta; New Jersey; D.C.; Beverly Hills; Miami; Potomac; Dallas; Salt Lake City; Dubai; Rhode Island

Miscellaneous
- Genre: Reality television
- Country of origin: United States

Official website
- bravotv.com/the-real-housewives

The Real Housewives is an American reality television franchise that began on March 21, 2006, with The Real Housewives of Orange County. Each installment of the franchise documents the personal and professional lives of a group of affluent women residing in a certain city or geopolitical region. Eleven different series have been produced in the United States, with one additional series set in the United Arab Emirates. In addition, there are 32 international adaptations. The American series is broadcast on Bravo. Previously, the Miami installment aired for a time on Peacock.

The first international adaptation, The Real Housewives of Athens, premiered on March 4, 2011. The longest-running international edition is The Real Housewives of Cheshire, which had just finished airing its nineteenth season.

The American franchise has led to 28 spin-off series in all, the most successful being Vanderpump Rules, which has itself had a number of spin-offs.

== History ==
"From Peyton Place to Desperate Housewives, viewers have been riveted by the fictionalized versions of such lifestyles on television. Now, here is a series that depicts real-life 'desperate' housewives with an authentic look at their compelling day-to-day drama."

— A press release by Bravo, describing the concept of The Real Housewives of Orange County.

The show was inspired by scripted soap operas, including Desperate Housewives and Peyton Place, and would document the lives of five to eight upper-class women who "lead glamorous lives in a picturesque Southern California gated community where the average home has a $1.6 million price tag and residents include CEOs and retired professional athletes."

On May 1, 2005, The Real Housewives was first announced as one of six reality television shows ordered by the American television network Bravo.

In January 2006, the show was announced as The Real Housewives of Orange County. However, filming began in 2005 under the title Behind the Gates. The first season aired on Bravo from March 21 to May 9, 2006. The original cast consisted of Kimberly Bryant, Jo De La Rosa, Vicki Gunvalson, Jeana Keough, and Lauri Waring. The show has had four spin-offs: Date My Ex: Jo & Slade, Tamra’s OC Wedding, Glitter Town, and Simply Gina.

In September 2007, the network started production for the show Manhattan Moms. In January 2008, the show was retitled as The Real Housewives of New York City became the second installment in the franchise. The first season aired on Bravo from March 4 to May 27, 2008. The original cast consisted of Bethenny Frankel, Luann de Lesseps, Alex McCord, Ramona Singer, and Jill Zarin. In 2022, the show was completely rebooted with a brand-new cast for the fourteenth season. The show has had four spin-offs: Bethenny Ever After, Bethenny & Fredrik, Luann & Sonja: Welcome to Crappie Lake, and The Golden Life.

In June 2008, the third installment in the franchise, The Real Housewives of Atlanta, was announced. The first season aired on Bravo from October 7 to November 25, 2008. The original cast consisted of NeNe Leakes, DeShawn Snow, Shereé Whitfield, Lisa Wu, and Kim Zolciak. The show has had ten spin-offs: Don't Be Tardy, The Kandi Factory, I Dream of NeNe: The Wedding, Kandi's Wedding, Kandi's Ski Trip, Xscape: Still Kickin' It, Kandi Koated Nights, Porsha's Having a Baby, Porsha's Family Matters and Kandi & The Gang.

In May 2008, the fourth installment in the franchise, The Real Housewives of New Jersey, was announced before the announcement of the Atlanta installment. The first season aired on Bravo from May 12 to July 8, 2009. The original cast consisted of Dina Manzo, Teresa Giudice, Jacqueline Laurita, Caroline Manzo, and Danielle Staub. The show has had three spin-offs: Boys to Manzo, Manzo'd with Children and Teresa Checks In.

In October 2009, the fifth installment in the franchise, The Real Housewives of D.C., was announced. The season aired on Bravo from August 5 to October 21, 2010. The cast consisted of Mary Amons, Lynda Erkiletian, Cat Ommanney, Michaele Salahi, and Stacie Scott Turner. The show ended after one season, becoming the first franchise to be canceled; its cancellation came after one of the cast members, Salahi, and her husband, Tareq, caused controversy by successfully entering the White House uninvited for a state dinner while being filmed for the show.

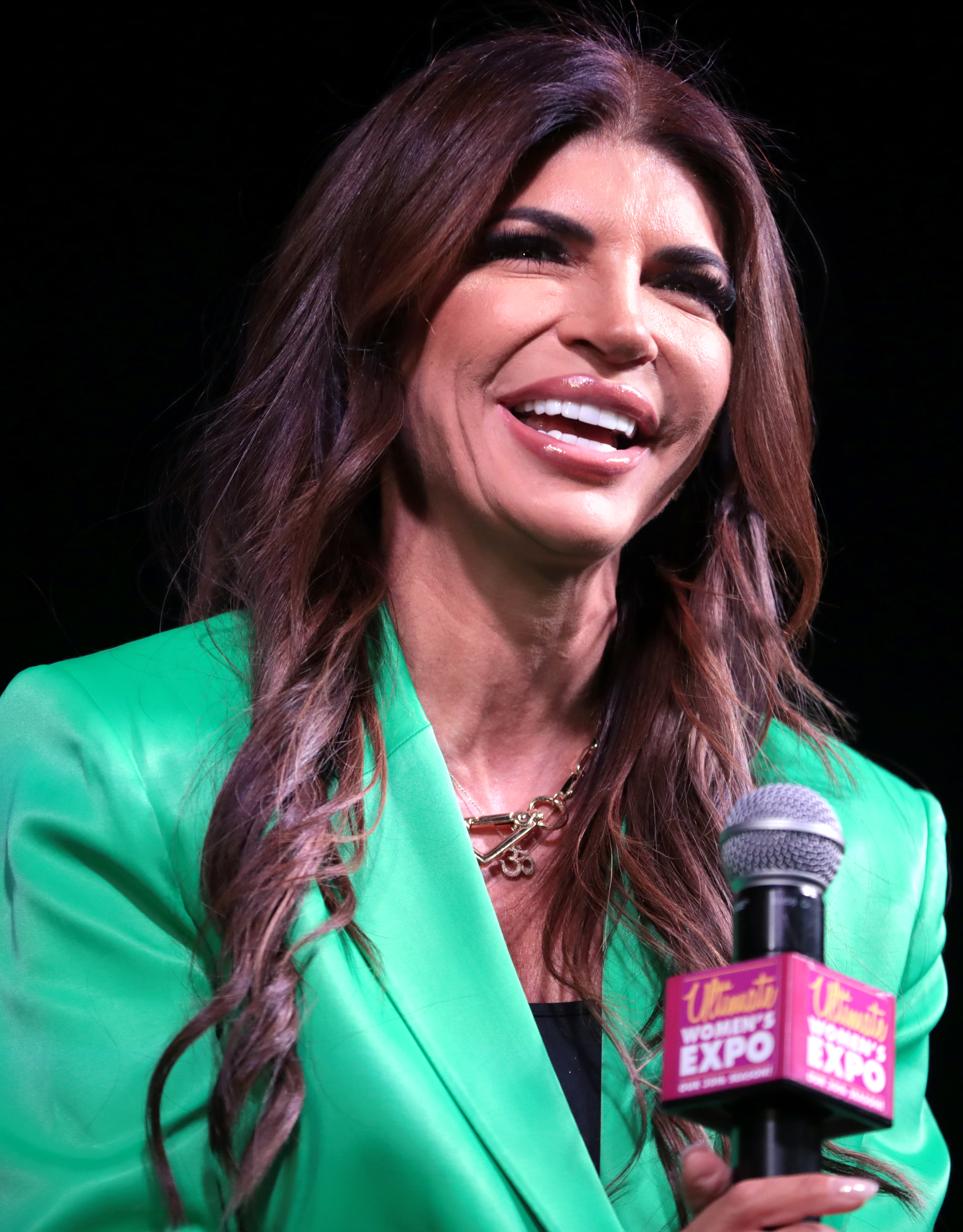
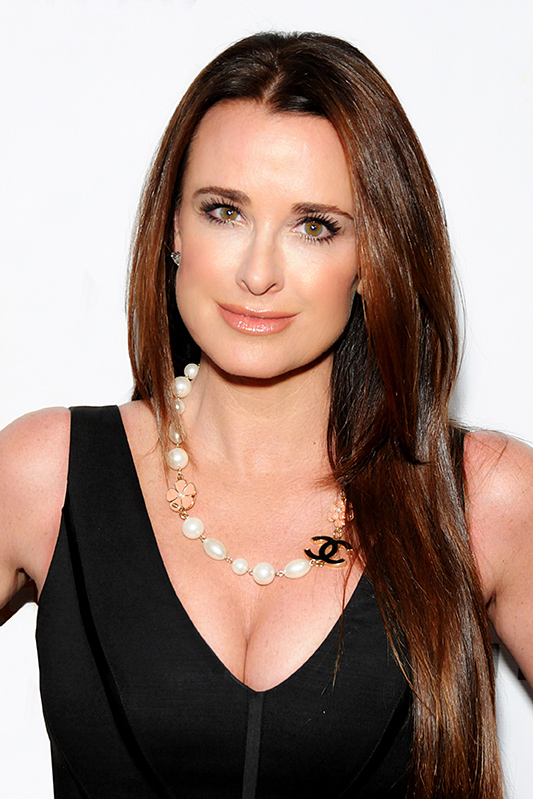
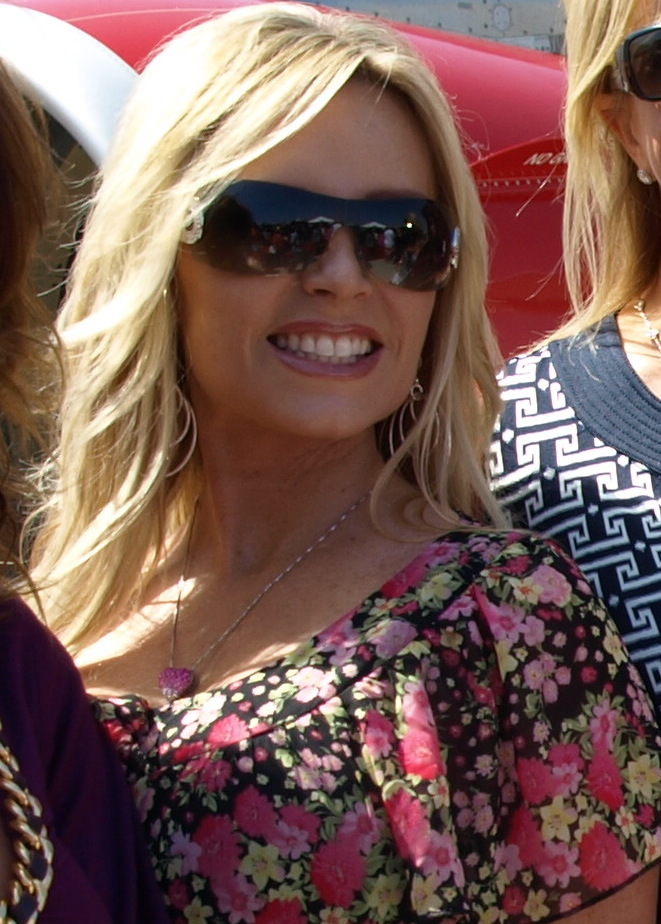
Teresa Giudice, Kyle Richards, and Tamra Judge serve as the longest-reigning cast members of The Real Housewives franchise.

In March 2010, the sixth installment in the franchise, The Real Housewives of Beverly Hills, was announced. The first season aired on Bravo from October 14, 2010, to February 15, 2011. The original cast consisted of Taylor Armstrong, Camille Grammer, Adrienne Maloof, Kim Richards, Kyle Richards, and Lisa Vanderpump. The show has had three spin-offs: Vanderpump Rules, Vanderpump Dogs, and Vanderpump Villa. Vanderpump Rules has had three additional spin-offs: Vanderpump Rules After Show, Vanderpump Rules: Jax & Brittany Take Kentucky, and The Valley, a show that premiered on March 19, 2024.

In March 2010, the network ordered a show titled Miami Social Club, which would serve as a reconstruction of Miami Social. The show was later retitled as The Real Housewives of Miami and became the seventh installment in the franchise. The first season aired on Bravo from February 22 to April 5, 2011. The original cast consisted of Lea Black, Adriana de Moura, Alexia Echevarria, Marysol Patton, Larsa Pippen, and Cristy Rice. The cast added Lisa Hochstein, Joanna Krupa, Ana Quincoces, and Karent Sierra as housewives in season 2. After an eight-year hiatus following season 3, the fourth season aired on Peacock from December 16, 2021, to March 10, 2022. The rebooted cast consisted of Guerdy Abraira, Lisa Hochstein, Julia Lemigova, Nicole Martin, Alexia Nepola née Echevarria, and Larsa Pippen. The show has had one spin-off: Havana Elsa.

In November 2015, the eighth installment in the franchise, The Real Housewives of Potomac, was announced. The series had the working title Potomac Ensemble prior to the announcement. The first season aired on Bravo from January 17 to April 17, 2016. The original cast consisted of Gizelle Bryant, Ashley Darby, Robyn Dixon, Karen Huger, Charrisse Jackson-Jordan, and Katie Rost. The show has had one spin-off: Karen's Grande Dame Reunion.

Prior to being announced, the ninth installment in the franchise, The Real Housewives of Dallas was initially titled Ladies of Dallas during its early production, a potential spin-off to Ladies of London. It was announced in November 2015. The first season aired on Bravo from April 11 to June 19, 2016. The original cast consisted of Cary Deuber, Tiffany Hendra, Stephanie Hollman, LeeAnne Locken, and Brandi Redmond. On August 17, 2021, the network announced that they had no plans to immediately renew the show for a sixth season, placing it on an indefinite hiatus.

At the first annual BravoCon is November 2019, the tenth installment in the franchise, The Real Housewives of Salt Lake City was announced. The first season aired on Bravo from November 11, 2020, to February 24, 2021. The original cast consisted of Lisa Barlow, Mary Cosby, Heather Gay, Meredith Marks, Whitney Rose and Jen Shah.

In November 2021, The Real Housewives of Dubai was announced as the network's eleventh and first original international installment of the franchise. The first season aired on Bravo from June 1, 2022, to September 7, 2022. The original cast consisted of Sara Al Madani, Nina Ali, Chanel Ayan, Caroline Brooks, Lesa Milan, and Caroline Stanbury. In November 2024, Bravo placed the series on hiatus.

In May 2025, the twelfth installment in the franchise, The Real Housewives of Rhode Island was announced at BravoCon. The first season premiered on Bravo on April 2, 2026. The original cast consisted of Alicia Carmody, Rosie DiMare, Ashley Iaconetti, Liz McGraw, Rulla Nehme Pontarelli, Kelsey Swanson, and Jo-Ellen Tiberi.

In June 2025, The Real Housewives franchise executive Lauren Miller died shortly after childbirth.

== List of installments and editions ==
Bravo has aired 12 series in the United States, of which 11 have been filmed in the country and one has been filmed internationally. The network has also licensed the brand to networks outside the United States, giving rise to several international installments, with varying levels of success.

The success of the American franchise has resulted in 28 spin-offs centered on specific housewives, with the longest-running being Vanderpump Rules, which focuses on the staff at the restaurants and bars owned by Lisa Vanderpump from The Real Housewives of Beverly Hills.

Indicates a series that is currently airing.
Indicates a series that has been confirmed for an upcoming season.
Indicates a series with an unknown status.
Indicates a series that has been put on hiatus.
Indicates a series that has been discontinued.

=== American installments ===
Produced by Bravo
| Series | Abbrev. | Location | Network | Premiere | Finale | Seasons | Specials | Ref. |
|---|---|---|---|---|---|---|---|---|
| The Real Housewives of Orange County | RHOC | California | Bravo | March 21, 2006 | —N/a | 20 | 2 | |
| The Real Housewives of New York City | RHONY | New York | Bravo | March 4, 2008 | —N/a | 16 | 5 | |
| The Real Housewives of Atlanta | RHOA | Georgia | Bravo | October 7, 2008 | —N/a | 18 | 10 | |
| The Real Housewives of New Jersey | RHONJ | New Jersey | Bravo | May 12, 2009 | —N/a | 15 | 5 | |
| The Real Housewives of D.C. | RHODC | Washington, D.C. | Bravo | August 5, 2010 | October 21, 2010 | 1 | —N/a | |
| The Real Housewives of Beverly Hills | RHOBH | California | Bravo | October 14, 2010 | —N/a | 16 | 2 | |
| The Real Housewives of Miami | RHOM | Florida | Bravo (Note: Season 1–3, 6–present) Peacock (Note: Season 4–5) | February 22, 2011 December 16, 2021 | November 14, 2013 October 16, 2025 | 7 | 2 | |
| The Real Housewives of Potomac | RHOP | Maryland | Bravo | January 17, 2016 | —N/a | 11 | 1 | |
| The Real Housewives of Dallas | RHOD | Texas | Bravo | April 11, 2016 | May 11, 2021 | 5 | —N/a | |
| The Real Housewives of Salt Lake City | RHOSLC | Utah | Bravo | November 11, 2020 | —N/a | 7 | 1 | |
| The Real Housewives of Dubai | RHODubai | United Arab Emirates | Bravo | June 1, 2022 | September 17, 2024 | 2 | —N/a | |
| The Real Housewives of Rhode Island | RHORI | Rhode Island | Bravo | April 2, 2026 | —N/a | 2 | —N/a | |

=== Ultimate editions ===
American-based
| Series | Abbrev. | Location | Network | Premiere | Finale | Total seasons | Total Specials | Ref. |
|---|---|---|---|---|---|---|---|---|
| The Real Housewives Ultimate Girls Trip | RHUGT | Various | Peacock | November 16, 2021 | —N/a | 6 (Note: A fourth produced season, The Real Housewives Ultimate Girls Trip: Morocco, remains unaired due to an ongoing legal dispute between Bravo and cast member Caroline Manzo.) | —N/a | |

Based internationally
| Series | Abbrev. | Location | Network | Premiere | Finale | Total seasons | Total Specials | Ref. |
|---|---|---|---|---|---|---|---|---|
| The Real Housewives Ultimate Girls Trip: South Africa | RHUGTSA | Jamaica | Showmax | May 27, 2024 | —N/a | 1 | —N/a | |
| The Real Housewives Ultimate Girls Trip: Africa | RHUGTA | Brazil | Showmax | November 28, 2025 | —N/a | 1 | —N/a | |

=== International installments ===
| Series | Abbrev. | Location | Network | Premiere | Finale | Seasons | Specials |
|---|---|---|---|---|---|---|---|
| The Real Housewives of Athens | RHOAthens | Greece | ANT1 | March 4, 2011 | May 27, 2011 | 1 | —N/a |
| Wealthy Women | RHOTLAVYF | Israel | Channel 10 | October 24, 2011 | July 24, 2013 | 3 | —N/a |
| The Real Housewives of Vancouver | RHOV | Canada | Slice | April 4, 2012 | April 9, 2013 | 2 | —N/a |
| The Real Housewives | LVH | France | NT1 | March 18, 2013 | April 1, 2013 | 1 | —N/a |
| The Real Housewives of Melbourne | RHOMelbourne | Australia | Arena (Note: Season 1–4); FOX Arena (Note: Season 5); Binge (Note: Season 6–) | February 23, 2014 | —N/a | 6 | —N/a |
| The Real Housewives of Cheshire | RHOCheshire | United Kingdom | ITVBe (Note: Seasons 1–18) ITV2 (Note: Season 19–present) | January 12, 2015 | —N/a | 19 | 3 |
| The Real Housewives of Auckland | RHOAKL | New Zealand | Bravo | August 22, 2016 | October 18, 2016 | 1 | 1 |
| The Real Housewives of Sydney | RHOS | Australia | Arena (Note: Season 1); Binge (Note: Season 2–3) | February 26, 2017 | May 6, 2025 | 3 | —N/a |
| The Real Housewives of Toronto | RHOT | Canada | Slice | March 7, 2017 | May 9, 2017 | 1 | —N/a |
| The Real Housewives of Hungary | FLK | Hungary | Viasat 3 | September 25, 2017 | December 21, 2020 | 4 | 1 |
| The Real Housewives of Johannesburg | RHOJ | South Africa | 1Magic | August 3, 2018 | August 18, 2023 | 3 | —N/a |
| The Real Housewives of Naples | RHODN | Italy | DPlay Plus (Note: Season 1 Streaming Telecast); Real Time (Note: TV Telecast); Discovery+ (Note: Season 2 Streaming Telecast) | November 29, 2019 | October 10, 2021 | 2 | —N/a |
| The Real Housewives of Jersey | RHOJersey | United Kingdom | ITVBe | December 28, 2020 | March 7, 2022 | 2 | —N/a |
| The Real Housewives of Durban | RHODurban | South Africa | Showmax | January 29, 2021 | —N/a | 5 | —N/a |
| The Real Housewives of Slovenia | RHOSlovenia | Slovenia | Planet TV | October 2, 2021 | December 4, 2021 | 1 | —N/a |
| The Real Housewives of Lagos | RHOLagos | Nigeria | Showmax | April 8, 2022 | —N/a | 3 | —N/a |
| The Real Housewives of Cape Town | RHOCT | South Africa | Mzansi Magic | July 10, 2022 | October 9, 2022 | 1 | —N/a |
| The Real Housewives of Pretoria | RHOPTA | South Africa | KykNET | October 13, 2022 | January 12, 2023 | 1 | —N/a |
| The Real Housewives of Amsterdam | RHOAMS | Netherlands | Videoland | November 24, 2022 | —N/a | 5 | —N/a |
| The Real Housewives of Gqeberha | RHOGQ | South Africa | 1Magic | February 3, 2023 | May 12, 2023 | 1 | —N/a |
| The Real Housewives of Abuja | RHOAbuja | Nigeria | Showmax | February 17, 2023 | June 2, 2023 | 1 | —N/a |
| The Real Housewives of Nairobi | RHONairobi | Kenya | Showmax | February 23, 2023 | August 23, 2024 | 2 | —N/a |
| The Real Housewives of the Cape Winelands | RHOWL | South Africa | KykNET | April 20, 2023 | July 20, 2023 | 1 | —N/a |
| The Real Housewives of Warsaw | RHOW | Poland | Polsat | September 6, 2023 | November 22, 2023 | 1 | —N/a |
| The Real Housewives of Budapest | RHOBudapest | Hungary | RTL (Hungary) | December 4, 2023 | December 22, 2023 | 1 | —N/a |
| The Real Housewives of Finland | RHOSuomi | Finland | Nelonen | February 14, 2024 | May 1, 2024 | 1 | —N/a |
| The Real Housewives of Rome | RHODR | Italy | Real Time; Discovery+ | April 24, 2024 | May 22, 2024 | 1 | —N/a |
| The Real Housewives of Munich | RHOMUC (Note: RTL+ used the hashtag RHOM under its posts on social media.) | Germany | RTL+ | July 6, 2024 | July 20, 2024 | 1 | —N/a |
| The Real Housewives of Antwerp | RHOANT | Belgium | Play4 (Note: Season 1 TV Telecast); Play (Note: TV Telecast since Season 2); Streamz (Note: Streaming Telecast) | March 17, 2025 | —N/a | 3 | —N/a |
| The Real Housewives of South Netherlands | RHVHZ | Netherlands | Videoland | April 18, 2025 | —N/a | 2 | —N/a |
| The Real Housewives of London | RHOLDN | United Kingdom | Hayu | August 18, 2025 | —N/a | 2 | —N/a |

=== American spin-offs ===
| Series | Cast member | Original series | Network | Series premiere | Series finale | No. of seasons | Ref. |
|---|---|---|---|---|---|---|---|
| Date My Ex: Jo & Slade | Jo De La Rosa | Orange County | Bravo | July 21, 2008 | September 8, 2008 | 1 | |
| Bethenny Ever After | Bethenny Frankel | New York City | Bravo | June 10, 2010 | May 28, 2012 | 3 | |
| Boys to Manzo | Albie Manzo; Chris Manzo (Note: Sons of Caroline Manzo) | New Jersey | BravoTV.com | May 30, 2011 | July 10, 2011 | 1 | |
| Don't Be Tardy | Kim Zolciak | Atlanta | Bravo | April 26, 2012 | December 29, 2020 | 8 | |
| Havana Elsa | Elsa Patton (Note: Mother of Marysol Patton) | Miami | BravoTV.com | September 17, 2012 | | 1 | |
| The Kandi Factory | Kandi Burruss | Atlanta | Bravo | April 9, 2013 | May 26, 2013 | 1 | |
| Joe & Rosie Explain | Joe Giudice (Note: Husband of Teresa Giudice); Rosie Pierri (Note: Cousin of Teresa Giudice) | New Jersey | BravoTV.com | May 6, 2013 | June 1, 2013 | 1 | |
| Vanderpump Rules | Lisa Vanderpump | Beverly Hills | Bravo | January 7, 2013 | —N/a | 12 | |
| Tamra's OC Wedding | Tamra Judge | Orange County | Bravo | September 2, 2013 | September 16, 2013 | 1 | |
| I Dream of NeNe: The Wedding | NeNe Leakes | Atlanta | Bravo | September 17, 2013 | October 27, 2013 | 1 | |
| Kandi's Wedding | Kandi Burruss | Atlanta | Bravo | June 1, 2014 | July 6, 2014 | 1 | |
| Manzo'd with Children | Caroline Manzo | New Jersey | Bravo | October 5, 2014 | October 30, 2016 | 3 | |
| Kandi's Ski Trip | Kandi Burruss | Atlanta | Bravo | May 17, 2015 | June 7, 2015 | 1 | |
| Teresa Checks In | Teresa Giudice | New Jersey | Bravo | October 11, 2015 | October 25, 2015 | 1 | |
| Xscape: Still Kickin' It | Kandi Burruss | Atlanta | Bravo | November 5, 2017 | November 26, 2017 | 1 | |
| Bethenny & Fredrik | Bethenny Frankel | New York City | Bravo | February 6, 2018 | March 20, 2018 | 1 | |
| Kandi Koated Nights | Kandi Burruss | Atlanta | Bravo | July 1, 2018 | July 15, 2018 | 1 | |
| Porsha's Having a Baby | Porsha Williams | Atlanta | Bravo | April 28, 2019 | May 12, 2019 | 1 | |
| Glitter Town | Lydia McLaughlin | Orange County | BravoTV.com | September 2, 2020 | | 1 | |
| Vanderpump Dogs | Lisa Vanderpump | Beverly Hills | Peacock | June 9, 2021 | | 1 | |
| Porsha's Family Matters | Porsha Williams | Atlanta | Bravo | November 28, 2021 | January 16, 2022 | 1 | |
| Kandi & The Gang | Kandi Burruss | Atlanta | Bravo | March 6, 2022 | May 8, 2022 | 1 | |
| Karen's Grande Dame Reunion | Karen Huger | Potomac | Bravo | April 17, 2022 | April 24, 2022 | 1 | |
| Luann & Sonja: Welcome to Crappie Lake | Luann de Lesseps; Sonja Morgan | New York City | Bravo | July 9, 2023 | August 20, 2023 | 1 | |
| Erika Jayne: Bet It All on Blonde | Erika Jayne | Beverly Hills | Bravo | March 6, 2024 | | 1 | |
| Bravo's Love Hotel | Various | | Bravo | April 27, 2025 | —N/a | 1 | |
| Wife Swap: The Real Housewives Edition | Various | | Bravo | October 21, 2025 | —N/a | 1 | |
| Surviving Mormonism with Heather Gay | Heather Gay | Salt Lake City | Bravo; Peacock | November 11, 2025 | November 12, 2025 | 1 | |

== Cast history ==
=== Longest-running cast members ===
Indicates a housewife currently starring on her franchise.
Indicates a housewife's status on her franchise is unknown.

Longest-running housewives from American installments
| Housewife | No. of seasons | Series | Seasons | UGT season | Spin-offs |
|---|---|---|---|---|---|
| Tamra Judge | 16 | Orange County | 3–14, 17–present | 2, 5 | 1 |
| Kyle Richards | 16 | Beverly Hills | 1–present, upcoming in 16 | 1, 5 | —N/a |
| Teresa Giudice | 15 | New Jersey | 1–present upcoming in 15 | 1, 5 | 1 |
| Vicki Gunvalson | 14 | Orange County | 1–13, 20–present | 2, 5 | —N/a |
| Kandi Burruss | 14 | Atlanta | 2–15 | —N/a | |
| Melissa Gorga | 13 | New Jersey | 3–present upcoming in 15 | 1, 5 | —N/a |
| Ramona Singer | 13 | New York City | 1–13 | 1, 4 | —N/a |
| Shannon Storms Beador | 12 | Orange County | 9–present | 5 | —N/a |
| Luann de Lesseps | 12 | New York City | 1–5, 7–13 | 1, 4 - 5 | 1 |
| Cynthia Bailey | 11 | Atlanta | 3–13 | 1, 5 | —N/a |
| Porsha Williams | 11 | Atlanta | 5–6, 8–13, 16–present, upcoming in 18 | 3, 5 | 2 |
| Gizelle Bryant | 11 | Potomac | 1–present, | 3, 5 | —N/a |
| Ashley Darby | 11 | Potomac | 1–present, | 5 | —N/a |
| Sonja Morgan | 11 | New York City | 3–13 | 4 | 1 |
| Erika Jayne | 11 | Beverly Hills | 6–present, upcoming in 16 | 5 | 1 |
| NeNe Leakes | 10 | Atlanta | 1–7, 10–12 | 5 | 1 |
| Phaedra Parks | 10 | Atlanta | 3-9, 16-present, upcoming in 18 | 2 | —N/a |
| Kenya Moore | 10 | Atlanta | 5–10, 12–15 | 1 | —N/a |
| Karen Huger | 10 | Potomac | 1–9, 11–present | - | 1 |
| Heather Dubrow | 10 | Orange County | 7–11, 16–present | 5 | —N/a |
| Dorit Kemsley | 10 | Beverly Hills | 7–present, upcoming in 16 | —N/a | —N/a |

Longest-running housewives from international installments
| Housewife | No. of seasons | Series | Seasons | UGT season |
|---|---|---|---|---|
| Lauren Simon | 17 | Cheshire | 1–8, 11–present | —N/a |
| Seema Malhotra | 17 | Cheshire | 3–19 | —N/a |
| Tanya Bardsley | 14 | Cheshire | 1–14 | —N/a |
| Rachel Lugo | 14 | Cheshire | 6–present | —N/a |
| Dawn Ward | 12 | Cheshire | 1–12 | —N/a |
| Hanna Kinsella | 9 | Cheshire | 8–16 | —N/a |
| Ester Dohnalová | 8 | Cheshire | 5–12 | —N/a |
| Nicole Sealey | 7 | Cheshire | 11–17 | —N/a |
| Lystra Adams | 7 | Cheshire | 12–18 | —N/a |
| Ampika Pickston | 6 | Cheshire | 1–5, 19–present | —N/a |
| Leanne Brown | 6 | Cheshire | 1–6 | —N/a |
| Sheena Lynch | 6 | Cheshire | 14–present | —N/a |
| Nonkululeko Nonku Williams | 6 | Durban | 1–present | 1 |
| Sorisha Naidoo | 5 | Durban | 1–present | —N/a |
| Jojo Robinson | 5 | Durban | 2-present | 1 |
| Gina Liano | 5 | Melbourne | 1-4, 6-present | —N/a |
| Janet Roach | 5 | Melbourne | 1-5 | —N/a |
| Jackie Gillies | 5 | Melbourne | 1-5 | —N/a |

Note: This list details Housewives that were featured as a friend of on another franchise.

| Housewife | Original series | Friend of | Season(s) |
|---|---|---|---|
| Taylor Armstrong | Beverly Hills | Orange County | 17 |
| Karen Loderick-Peace | Jersey | Cheshire | 15 |
| Magli Gorré | Cheshire | Amsterdam | 1 |
| Dolores Catania | New Jersey | Rhode Island | 1 |

== Format and elements ==
Each series focuses on the lives and social dynamics of a core group of around five to eight women in a particular city or geographic area. Cast members are typically relatively wealthy, middle-aged women. Scenes may depict cast members' personal and professional lives, and especially their social interactions with one another. Individual scenes may feature any combination of cast members (including solo scenes), though producers aim to include at least one "tent-pole" event per episode, which brings together the full cast. A single season typically consists of around 15–25 episodes.

The franchise has been described as a "docu-soap"— a hybrid of the reality television and soap opera genres. The shows are not scripted, but field producers often intervene to steer the direction of conversations or inflame conflicts.

=== Opening credits and taglines ===
A portion of the opening credits for the ninth season of The Real Housewives of New York City, showing the taglines of Luann de Lesseps, Tinsley Mortimer, and Bethenny Frankel. In the cast lineup at the end of the credits, the women hold golden apples (in reference to the "Big Apple" epithet of New York City), with Frankel occupying the center position. Cast members (L-R): Luann de Lesseps, Dorinda Medley, Ramona Singer, Bethenny Frankel, Sonja Morgan, Tinsley Mortimer and Carole Radziwill.

A highly recognizable and frequently parodied feature of the franchise is its opening credits, which feature clips and green screen footage of each housewife in turn, with each housewife delivering a "tagline"—a short quip alluding to some aspect of their personality or story. For example, for season six of The Real Housewives of Beverly Hills, Lisa Vanderpump, who runs a dog rescue organization, used the tagline "I'm passionate about dogs, just not crazy about bitches".

Housewives record several taglines for a given season, some of which may be written by the housewife herself and some given by producers, with the network having final say on which one is used. Actress Joyce Giraud, who had only appeared in the fourth season of the Beverly Hills installment, received backlash for her tagline of, "You can never be too young, too thin, or too honest," which was perceived as a signal to eating disorders. In an interview with Heather McDonald, Giraud admitted she was given the tagline by a producer who assured her the phrase would only be recorded as an option, but would not be picked. Upon receiving the first viewing for the season, Giraud contested the tagline and asked for its removal and replacement, which was denied.

The credits end with a title card showing a lineup of the entire cast holding in their outstretched hands an object symbolic or related to the show's location.

The Housewives of Orange County aptly hold oranges; the women of New York City hold apples as New York City's nickname is 'The Big Apple'; the women of Atlanta hold peaches as Georgia is referred to as the Peach State, and the women of Dallas held CGI stars as Texas is referred to as The Lone Star State. The only series' that have not held an object are the New Jersey, and D.C. franchises. This began as an allusion to the opening credits of Desperate Housewives, which featured the show's main actresses holding apples, and each object is often used as a symbolic reference for being a cast member on each respective show — for example, if a long-time guest on a franchise is finally cast to appear full time, her cast mates may say she has "finally earned her peach." The housewife in the center of the cast shot is generally chosen to be the cast member who had the greatest impact on the season.

=== Blogs and Aftershows ===
Beginning in the early seasons of the Orange County and New York City franchises, the women were required to write weekly blogs, uploaded to BravoTV.com, for each episode aligned with their season's airing. The blogs were often a center of conflict during each franchise's respective reunion. Due to the rise in social media use, the blogs were phased out around 2017.

In 2018, Bravo introduced the Real Housewives After Shows, beginning with the tenth season of the Atlanta franchise, and having continued with every franchise there on afterwards.

=== Reunion episodes ===
Each season of a Real Housewives series ends with a "reunion", in which the cast members convene to discuss the events of the season. The reunion is generally filmed after most of the season has aired, and the women have had a chance to view the season's episodes. Reunions are filmed in a single day over the course of around ten hours, but are generally edited into two or three one-hour episodes.

Housewives are typically paid for their participation in each season of the program in two separate amounts, with the second portion paid to the Housewives after the filming of the reunion. When Adrienne Maloof failed to show up for The Real Housewives of Beverly Hills season three reunion in 2013, a precedent was set where, with the exception of certain circumstances such as attending an alcohol rehabilitation facility, the Housewife's employment as a cast member on the program is terminated if she is a no-show. Housewives to skip the reunion and not return to the series in the next season include Maloof, Mary Cosby (Salt Lake City), and Lisa Vanderpump (Beverly Hills).

Cast members are seated on couches on either side of a host (Andy Cohen, in the case of the American editions) who asks the cast questions (sometimes viewer-submitted) about the events of the season. It is theorized that the closer a Housewife sits to the host, the more integral the part she played in the drama and storyline that season. By 2016, entertainment websites were analyzing the importance of the reunion seating charts, with Slice noting that the Housewives assigned to the "end spots", meaning the ones farthest away from the host, meant a near-certain end to their time on Real Housewives. (Note: This is likely not the case. For example, Phaedra Parks of Atlanta had been seated at the end for her first four reunions (Seasons 3-6) yet remained on the show. It was not until her final season that she was seated next to the host. However, she was fired following the conclusion of the season. This displays how being seated at the end does not mean an imminent firing. On the flip side, it also shows that being seated next to the host does not equate to automatic job security.) Housewives generally dress formally, in evening or cocktail dresses, for reunions.

In addition to answering questions, the Housewives are given the chance to look back on video clips of events from the season, with their reactions shown to the audience via picture-in-picture. "Friends of the Housewives", part-time cast members, typically only appear for a portion of the reunion time. (Note: This is assuming that they have been invited to the taping at all. The producers decide whether or not a "Friend Of" has contributed significantly enough to the season to attend the reunion for that season. For example, both Kathy Hilton and Sheree Zampino served as Friends Of on Season 12 of Beverly Hills. However, only Hilton was invited to the taping of the reunion.) In many but not all American Real Housewives installments, a segment of the reunion is filmed with the husbands of the Housewives joining their spouses on stage and giving their thoughts on what happened during the filming of the season. The first show to debut such a segment was The Real Housewives of Orange County in 2010, and many production companies now consider spouse participation to be standard fare on reunion day. The vast majority of reunion specials end with the cast making a toast, signifying a formal end to the season. In many cases production makes note of offering non-alcoholic toasts to Housewives who have quit drinking alcohol, or who are pregnant.

The final episode of the first season of The Real Housewives of Orange County, the franchise's original incarnation, diverged from the now-standard reunion format; it lacked a host, and the women dressed casually and cordially reminisced over the course of a single episode, set in the backyard of one of the women. The reunion for the second season, then titled "Real Housewives Confess: A Watch What Happens Special", was the first to feature Andy Cohen as host, and to use the talk show-like format which subsequent reunions would adopt. From then on, a standard season-ending reunion would play out across two episodes, with season three of The Real Housewives of New York City debuting the franchise's first-ever three-part reunion in June 2010. In the years since, three-part reunions have become commonplace on many American Housewives series, and in April 2017, The Real Housewives of Atlanta ended its ninth season with a four-part reunion special. The four-part reunion special format was later duplicated by the Potomac and Beverly Hills installments in 2021.

During the COVID-19 pandemic in 2020, the season 12 and season 10 reunions of Atlanta and Beverly Hills respectively were filmed virtually, on Zoom, from the homes of Cohen and the Housewives due to lockdown orders at the time.

== Production ==
Each Real Housewives program is made by a different production company, though some are responsible for more than one show. For example, Evolution Media produces both The Real Housewives of Orange County and The Real Housewives of Beverly Hills. A season is shot on location over the course of around four to six months. The typical field crew for a show consists of three production crews of around ten people, including one lead producer, several camera crew, and a sound technician. Small scenes, such as those centered on just one or two housewives, are shot by a single production crew, whereas multiple crews will cover larger events involving most of the cast.

The postproduction process of putting episodes together takes around ten to twelve weeks and begins near the end of filming. Estimates for the amount of raw footage recorded per hour-long episode have ranged from 40 to 85 hours.

=== Casting ===
While early seasons occasionally made use of open casting calls, potential housewives are more typically referred by existing cast members or invited to interview by casting agents as a result of their research into the city's social circles. Candidates must pass through three stages: a phone interview with a casting director, a video interview, and finally a filmed home visit, simulating the process of filming a scene for the show.

The casting of Housewives' family members as primary cast members has occurred many times, with The Real Housewives of New Jersey casting siblings in its first season. This particular installment of the franchise would later cast sisters-in-law, cousins, and even twin sisters. The first mother-daughter Housewives, Evodia and Mercy Mogase from The Real Housewives of Johannesburg, eventually received their own spinoff program in 2020.

=== Contracts ===
The compensation of Real Housewives cast members has been the subject of some speculation. In his book about the Housewives franchise, writer Brian Moylan estimates that, as of 2021, a cast member would receive around $60,000 for her first season, increasing year over year up to a cap of around $300,000 to $500,000. Certain "star" cast members have been rumored to be paid figures in the low millions, such as NeNe Leakes, and Kandi Burruss of The Real Housewives of Atlanta, Lisa Vanderpump of The Real Housewives of Beverly Hills, and Vicki Gunvalson of The Real Housewives of Orange County. In the early years of the franchise, cast members were paid considerably less, with Real Housewives of New York City cast member Bethenny Frankel stating that she was paid $7,250 for her appearance on the show's first season in 2008.

A notable provision of housewives' contracts is the so-called "Bethenny clause", which states that Bravo receives 10% of the sale price of any business a cast member starts while on the show, provided that it sells for more than 1 million dollars. The colloquial name for the clause is in reference to Bethenny Frankel, who sold her Skinnygirl cocktail line in 2011 for a reported $120 million.

=== Confessional interviews ===
Like many reality television shows, the Real Housewives franchise makes use of confessional interviews, in which scenes are interspersed with "talking head" commentary from the cast members. Confessional interviews were originally filmed at the housewives' homes, but are now mostly shot on a soundstage in front of a green screen, with an image of the cast member's home composited behind them. Interviews are filmed periodically during and after the filming of a season, sometimes over the course of a full day, and involve the women responding to questions from an off-screen producer. Over the years, cast members have adopted increasingly elaborate hair, makeup, and fashions for confessional interviews, and may spend between 45 minutes and three hours before filming in order to prepare their looks with the help of hair and makeup artists. Each cast member typically has three different confessional looks for a season, with some franchises adopting up to seven, which may need to be reproduced in multiple interview sessions for the sake of continuity. Confessional looks must be approved in advance by producers and the network.

=== Potential additional locations ===
On December 2, 2016, Cohen spoke on the future of the franchise, saying if there were to be a new installment to the franchise, it could potentially be set in Nashville. Cohen also stated that an All Star edition of the franchise would serve as an end-goal if ratings began to drop. Later in December 2016, during an interview with Harry Connick Jr., Cohen stated that they look for cities with strong personalities, and agreed that New Orleans fits that criterion.

Cities where Cohen and other producers began the casting process but ultimately decided not to create a series include Chicago, Greenwich, Houston and San Francisco.

== Criticism ==
Feminist leader Gloria Steinem has vociferously criticized the Real Housewives franchise for "presenting women as rich, pampered, dependent and hateful towards each other."

"It is women, all dressed up and inflated and plastic surgeried and false bosomed and incredible amount of money spent, not getting along with each other. Fighting with each other. It is a minstrel show for women. I don't believe it, I have to say. I feel like it's manufactured, that the fights between them are manufactured and they're supposed to go after each other in a kind of conflicting way."

— Steinem summed up her dislike of the franchise in 2013

Others have criticized the show for its promotion of conspicuous consumption. The franchise is often analyzed through a lens of feminist political economy, and how the show "creates rich women as objects of cultural derision, well-heeled jesters in a populist court."

In October 2019, The New York Times ran an article criticizing how the casts of the different Real Housewives installments appear "segregated" by skin color. Author Tracie Egan Morrissey pointed to Potomac and Atlanta for their almost entirely African American casts, while the other iterations, such as Beverly Hills, Orange County, Dallas, New York, and New Jersey, are overwhelmingly white and have featured few women of color. The Real Housewives of New York did not have an African-American cast member until 2021; while the addition of Kary Brittingham to Dallas in 2019 marked the show's first Hispanic cast member. Beverly Hills, with the exception of season four’s Joyce Giraud, featured "a racially homogeneous cast throughout its run", until the addition of Garcelle Beauvais in 2019 and Crystal Kung-Minkoff in 2021.

The Real Housewives of Dubai installment, which premiered on June 1, 2022, has been the subject of criticism due to its setting in Dubai, United Arab Emirates. On May 25, 2022, a group of 12 human rights organizations, including Freedom Forward, CODEPINK and FairSquare, wrote an open letter to Andy Cohen and other executives condemning the decision to film a show there, citing the Dubai and UAE governments purported homophobia and women's rights violations. The groups asked the producers to reveal the financial role of the UAE in the series' production, run a disclaimer, and publicly cite past human rights abuses committed by the emirate.

In January 2024, former The Real Housewives of New Jersey star Caroline Manzo filed a lawsuit against Bravo which alleged that the network and its affiliated companies—Forest Productions, Warner Bros. Entertainment, NBCUniversal Media, Shed Media and Peacock TV— would "regularly ply the Real Housewives cast with alcohol, cause them to become severely intoxicated, and then direct, encourage and/or allow them to sexually harass other cast members because that is good for ratings." The lawsuit was filed a year after it was reported Brandi Glanville gave Manzo "unwanted kisses" while they participated in season 5 of The Real Housewives Ultimate Girls Trip. The lawsuit also accused Bravo of knowing that Glanville, who was also previously a cast member of The Real Housewives of Beverly Hills, had a history of sexual misconduct, but hired her anyway for good ratings.

== Syndication ==
The first four installments entered weekday broadcast syndication in the majority of United States markets on September 13, 2010, with episodes of The Real Housewives of Orange County. The Real Housewives of Atlanta started airing episodes in the syndicated time slot on October 25, 2010; The Real Housewives of New York City on November 29, 2010; and The Real Housewives of New Jersey on January 17, 2011. More episodes of Orange County and an encore of Atlanta finished off the season.

== Parodies ==
Since the conception of the series, The Real Housewives franchise has been parodied in television, film, theatre and online media.

=== Television ===
==== Series ====
- Real Husbands of Hollywood is a reality television parody show broadcast on BET from January 15, 2013, to December 13, 2016, created by Kevin Hart. The show ran for five seasons, before being revived on BET+ in February 2022.
- The Hotwives is a sitcom parody show broadcast on Hulu from July 15, 2014, to September 15, 2015. Created by Dannah Phirman and Danielle Schneider, the show ran for two seasons. The first season was set in Orlando, Florida, while the second was set in Las Vegas.
- In Kenya, a parody of The Real Housewives began airing in July 2014, titled Real Househelps of Kawangware. The show was added to the South African mobile streaming service ShowMax in October 2016.

==== Episodes ====
- The 30 Rock episodes "Queen of Jordan" (2011) and "Queen of Jordan 2: Mystery of the Phantom Pooper" (2012) were both structured as episodes of a fictional reality show called Queen of Jordan which parodied several personalities and events of The Real Housewives franchise, particularly The Real Housewives of New Jersey. The 2012 episode "Idiots Are People Three!" also featured Denise Richards parodying LuAnn de Lesseps's song "Chic, C'est La Vie" as "J'adore La Piscine".
- The 2022 episode "The Real Rodents of Little Rodentia" of the Disney+ series Zootopia+ parodies the format of The Real Housewives; Crystal Kung Minkoff from Beverly Hills and Porsha Williams from Atlanta make guest appearances voicing two of Fru Fru's friends.

==== Sketches ====
- From 2009 to 2012, a recurring sketch titled The Real Housewives of Late Night aired on Late Night with Jimmy Fallon. The sketch featured the men dressing up as their wives in a parody of The Real Housewives franchise.
- On November 2, 2010, Saturday Night Live parodied The Real Housewives franchise as a whole, with a segment titled Women of SNL. The segment was stylized as though it were a reunion special, which guest starred Andy Cohen making a cameo as the host for the segment. The skit featured classic housewives moments spoofed by many women who are a part of Saturday Night Live, including Rachel Dratch, Nora Dunn, Tina Fey, Ana Gasteyer, Julia Louis-Dreyfus, Laraine Newman, Cheri Oteri, Amy Poehler, Maya Rudolph, Molly Shannon, and Kristen Wiig.
- Saturday Night Live parodied The Real Housewives again on March 3, 2012, with a sketch called Real Housewives of Disney guest starring Lindsay Lohan as Rapunzel.
- On November 5, 2014, a parody titled Housewives of Narromine aired in Australia, on ABC's Indigenous sketch show, Black Comedy. The skit featured back and forth comedy between two characters located in Narromine, played by Deborah Mailman and Elizabeth Wymarra.
- From May 24 to November 8, 2015, the Australian sketch show Open Slather frequently parodied the series with the sketch The Real Housewives of The World. The sketch featured prominent women in politics in the format of The Real Housewives. The cast included Marg Downey as Helen Clark, Gina Riley as Hillary Clinton and Magda Szubanski as Angela Merkel. In the same series, Gina Riley also played a parodied version of The Real Housewives of Melbourne cast member Gina Liano.
- On June 16, 2016, the franchise was parodied in episode 9 in the fourth season of Inside Amy Schumer. Amy Schumer parodied The Real Housewives' reunion with Andy Cohen making a guest appearance as himself, as the host.
- In New Zealand, a parody series called Fresh Housewives of South Auckland aired on TV2 during the Saturday morning segment Fresh and was released online. It ran for eight episodes from November September 11, to November 2, 2016.
- In January 2017, the BBC2 comedy show Revolting aired the sketch "The Real Housewives of ISIS", which featured women affiliated with the terrorist organization in the style of The Real Housewives franchise.

=== Film ===
- On February 25, 2011, Third Degree Films released a pornographic parody film of the franchise, titled The Real Housewives of San Fernando Valley.
- In February 2014, Michael Kulich produced a pornographic film called The Real Housewives of Westport featuring Nina Hartley.

=== Theatre ===
- The series was parodied in August 2012 by the musical The Real Drunk Housewives of the San Fernando Valley, which featured Rachel Reilly.
- The musical parody The Real Housewives of Walnut Creek ran in April and May 2014 at Lesher Center for the Arts in Walnut Creek, California. The musical was created by Molly Bell, who also starred, and was presented by the Center REPertory. In April 2016, the musical was restaged as Real Housewives of Toluca Lake at the Falcon Theatre in Burbank, California.
- In the United Kingdom, the theater production The Real Hoosewives - Fae Glesga ran from September 10 to September 14, 2014, at the Pavilion Theatre in Glasgow.
- From January to May 2016, a performance titled The Realish Housewives: A Parody toured cities across the United States. Each performance was titled "The Realish Housewives of [the city they performed in]".
- From July 16 to September 12, 2016, a parody theater piece called Housewives of Secaucus, a Suburban Travesty was shown in New Jersey and New York across several venues. The show also parodied reality television series Jersey Shore and Mob Wives
- In October 2016, a musical titled The Real Wicked Witches of Halloween Hills was performed over 2 nights on October 29 and October 30, at Westchester Broadway Theatre and Emelin Theatre in New York. The musical is a family-friendly Halloween take on The Real Housewives franchise.
- In May 2021, the play "This American Wife" parodied and reenacted characters from across The Real Housewives franchise. Written and directed by Pulitzer Prize for Drama nominees Michael Breslin and Patrick Foley, and produced by Jeremy O. Harris, the play was filmed on multiple cameras and livestreamed from an actual Long Island mansion during the COVID-19 pandemic.

=== Web series ===
- The 2009 online series The unReal Housewives of Kansas City had seven episodes in all. It was directed by Jon Davis, and starred Michelle Davidson, Meagan Flynn, Erin McGrane, Tasha Smith and Jennifer Plas. Davidson, Flynn and Plas also served as writers for the series.
- The Real Housewives of South Boston is a YouTube parody series created by Lucia Aniello and Paul W. Downs in October 2011.
- Real Housewives of Benning Road is a YouTube parody series created Brooks and Amon Williams of Hardhead Films. The series aired for 3 seasons between 2013 and 2014.
- Nerdist aired The Real Housewives of Horror, from October 29 to December 4, 2014. The series is written and created by Brea Grant, who also stars in the series, and is a mash-up of the horror movie genre and The Real Housewives franchise.
- On April 12, 2015, former Big Brother contestant Wil Hueser released a video titled The Real Housewives of Louisville on his YouTube channel, which went on to serve as the first season. On June 16, 2016, Hueser began airing a second season of his series. The series features Hueser parodying multiple women from Louisville, including his own mother.
- In late August 2016, Real Housewives of Christchurch began airing as an online series. The series is designed as a parody of The Real Housewives of Auckland and showcases everyday women, rather than the wealthy and polished women featured on the Auckland series. In September 2016, cast-members of The Real Housewives of Auckland, Gilda Kirkpatrick and Anne Batley-Burton, were featured in a video meeting with the ladies of The Real Housewives of Christchurch.
- In October 2016, a web series titled The Real Houseboys of Waiheke began airing as a parody of The Real Housewives and more specifically The Real Housewives of Auckland.
- In a collaboration with Bravo, Mashable began airing an online mini-series titled The Real Housekids. It began on August 1, 2016, and featured children recreating well-known scenes from the franchise. In total four episodes were released, three featuring scenes from The Real Housewives of Atlanta and one featuring a scene from The Real Housewives of Orange County.
- In 2017, Jimmy Tatro and Christian A. Pierce created The Real Bros of Simi Valley, which premiered on YouTube and later moved to Facebook Watch in season 2.

=== Web-based sketches ===
- On August 14, 2012, The Real Housekeepers of Long Island was released online as a parody of the series, created by Tyler Gildin.
- On October 12, 2012, a segment was published on Funny or Die titled The Real Dragwives: Very Rich. The video is a parody of a scene from The Real Housewives of Atlanta, with Latrice Royale in the role of NeNe Leakes and DiDa Ritz in the role of Sheree Whitfield.
- In June 2015, Dirty Cues Productions produced the parody The Real Housewives of Westeros, combining the popular HBO show Game of Thrones with the Real Housewives franchise.
- On October 14, 2016, a parody video was released online called The Real Housewitches of Salem. The video parodied The Real Housewives as well as Hocus Pocus and Mean Girls.

=== Other parodies and allusions ===
- In 2009, Amy Phillips began impersonating stars from Bravo and many other celebrities on her YouTube channel and eventually began parodying the women from The Real Housewives. Since she began, Phillips has since been endorsed by Bravo and has made several appearances on Watch What Happens Live!. In January 2016, Phillips parodied both The Real Housewives and Star Wars in Star Wars: The Housewives Awaken, during her segment Reality Checked with Amy Phillips, on SiriusXM's Radio Andy.
- On February 26, 2012, The Real Housewives was parodied during episode 2 of the fifth season of The Celebrity Apprentice, during a task sponsored by Medieval Times. Contestant and star of The Real Housewives of New Jersey Teresa Giudice recreated her table-flipping scene from The Real Housewives of New Jersey in a segment titled The Unreal Housewives of Camelot.
- In the 2013 film The Best Man Holiday, Melissa De Sousa's character "Shelby" is a star of the fictional reality show The Real Housewives of Westchester.
- In episode 9 of the fourth season of Hot in Cleveland, which aired on January 23, 2013, actress, and cast member of The Real Housewives of Orange County, Heather Dubrow guest starred as Nikki, the wife of Emmet (Alan Dale), who is trying to get on the fictional series True Housewives of Tampa St. Pete.
- SBS 2's The Feed parodied the franchise in August 2014, with a segment titled The Real Newsreaders of Sydney. The segment featured Sandra Sully, Lee Lin Chin and Natalie Barr.
- On May 4, 2015, The Real Housewives was parodied during the tenth episode in the seventh season of RuPaul's Drag Race. In a mini-challenge titled Fake Housewives of RuPaul's Drag Race, the contestants were challenged to create a tagline, replicating the taglines of The Real Housewives franchise, as well as replicating plastic surgery using tape.
- The Real Tradies of Melbourne is an online video released on July 29, 2015, created to promote awareness for Tradies National Health Month. The video features Shane Jacobson, as well as original The Real Housewives of Melbourne cast member Andrea Moss.
- On August 11, 2016, during an episode of Watch What Happens Live, Andy Cohen featured a segment titled The Real Housewives of Rio, inspired by the then-ongoing 2016 Summer Olympics. The segment featured current and former Olympians (like Nadia Comăneci) delivering Real Housewives-style taglines.
- On October 27, 2016, a scene from The Real Housewives of New York City, featuring Aviva Drescher throwing her prosthetic leg, was parodied by Alaska Thunderfuck 5000 during the reunion for the second season of RuPaul's Drag Race All Stars.
- On October 26, 2016, the We the Voters campaign released a video online titled Real Voters of the USA, which used the format of The Real Housewives franchise to display that people could discuss politics without fighting. The video featured three housewives who were portrayed by Anabelle Acosta, Charlotte McKinney and Analeigh Tipton.
- In the fifth episode of the Disney+ series High School Musical: The Musical: The Series, "The Real Campers of Shallow Lake", the characters are inspired by the Real Housewives franchise to act more dramatic so that the documentary crew filming them won't write them off as boring.

== Awards and nominations ==
The franchise has collectively won four National Reality Television Awards, a Critics' Choice Television Award, a Critics' Choice Real TV Award, and an MTV Movie & TV Award. It has also received nominations at the Primetime Emmy Awards, People's Choice Awards, AACTA Awards, Dorian Awards, Leo Awards, TCA Awards, Canadian Screen Awards, and TRIC Awards.

| Year | Award | Category | Program | Result |
|---|---|---|---|---|
| 2010 | Dorian Award | Campy TV Show of the Year | Real Housewives of New Jersey | Nominated |
| 2011 | People's Choice Awards | Favorite TV Guilty Pleasure | Real Housewives of New Jersey | Nominated |
| 2011 | Critics' Choice Television Awards | Best Reality Series | Real Housewives of Beverly Hills | Won |
| 2011 | Dorian Award | Campy TV Show of the Year | Real Housewives franchise | Nominated |
| 2013 | Canadian Screen Awards | Reality/Competition Program or Series | Real Housewives of Vancouver | Nominated |
| 2014 | AACTA Awards | Best Editing in Television | The Real Housewives of Melbourne | Nominated |
| 2015 | AACTA Awards | Best Reality Series | The Real Housewives of Melbourne | Nominated |
| 2015 | National Reality Television Awards | Best Reality Non-Competition Show | The Real Housewives of Cheshire | Nominated |
| 2015 | National Reality Television Awards | Best International Show | The Real Housewives of Beverly Hills | Nominated |
| 2016 | National Reality Television Awards | Outstanding Achievement Award | Lisa Vanderpump | Won |
| 2016 | National Reality Television Awards | Best International Show | Vanderpump Rules | Won |
| 2016 | National Reality Television Awards | Best Female Personality | Ampika Pickston (The Real Housewives of Cheshire) | Won |
| 2017 | National Reality Television Awards | Best Reality Non-Competition Show | Real Housewives of Cheshire | Nominated |
| 2017 | National Reality Television Awards | Best International Show | Vanderpump Rules | Nominated |
| 2017 | National Reality Television Awards | Best International Show | The Real Housewives of Atlanta | Nominated |
| 2017 | National Reality Television Awards | Best International Show | The Real Housewives of Beverly Hills | Nominated |
| 2017 | National Reality Television Awards | Celebrity Personality of the Year | Lisa Vanderpump (Vanderpump Rules) | Nominated |
| 2017 | National Reality Television Awards | Celebrity Personality of the Year | Ampika Pickston (Real Housewives of Cheshire) | Won |
| 2017 | National Reality Television Awards | Best Female Personality | Ampika Pickston (Real Housewives of Cheshire) | Nominated |
| 2018 | People's Choice Awards | The Reality Show of 2018 | Vanderpump Rules | Nominated |
| 2018 | MTV Movie & TV Awards | Best Reality Series/Franchise | Real Housewives | Nominated |
| 2018 | MTV Movie & TV Awards | Best Reality Series/Franchise | Vanderpump Rules | Nominated |
| 2018 | TRIC Awards | Reality Programme | The Real Housewives of Cheshire | Nominated |
| 2018 | AACTA Awards | Best Reality Series | The Real Housewives of Melbourne | Nominated |
| 2018 | Leo Awards | Best Sound (Information, Lifestyle, or Reality Series) | The Real Housewives of Toronto | Nominated |
| 2018 | National Reality Television Awards | Best International Show | The Real Housewives of New York City | Nominated |
| 2019 | People's Choice Awards | The Reality Show of 2019 | The Real Housewives of Atlanta | Nominated |
| 2019 | People's Choice Awards | The Reality Show of 2019 | The Real Housewives of Beverly Hills | Nominated |
| 2019 | People's Choice Awards | The Reality Show of 2019 | Vanderpump Rules | Nominated |
| 2019 | People's Choice Awards | The Reality Star of 2019 | Kandi Burruss (The Real Housewives of Atlanta) | Nominated |
| 2019 | People's Choice Awards | The Reality Star of 2019 | Nene Leakes (The Real Housewives of Atlanta) | Nominated |
| 2019 | People's Choice Awards | The Reality Star of 2019 | Kyle Richards (The Real Housewives of Beverly Hills) | Nominated |
| 2019 | People's Choice Awards | The Reality Star of 2019 | Lisa Vanderpump (The Real Housewives of Beverly Hills) | Nominated |
| 2019 | MTV Movie & TV Awards | Best Reality Royalty | Lisa Vanderpump (The Real Housewives of Beverly Hills) | Nominated |
| 2019 | Critics' Choice Real TV Award | Ensemble Cast in an Unscripted Series | The Real Housewives of New York City | Nominated |
| 2020 | People's Choice Awards | The Reality Show of 2020 | The Real Housewives of Atlanta | Nominated |
| 2020 | People's Choice Awards | The Reality Show of 2020 | The Real Housewives of Beverly Hills | Nominated |
| 2020 | People's Choice Awards | The Reality Star of 2020 | Kandi Burruss (The Real Housewives of Atlanta) | Nominated |
| 2020 | People's Choice Awards | The Reality Star of 2020 | Porsha Williams (The Real Housewives of Atlanta) | Nominated |
| 2020 | People's Choice Awards | The Reality Star of 2020 | Lisa Rinna (The Real Housewives of Beverly Hills) | Nominated |
| 2020 | National Reality Television Awards | Best Reality Non-Competition Show | The Real Housewives of Cheshire | Nominated |
| 2020 | National Reality Television Awards | Reality Personality of the Year | Seema Malhotra (The Real Housewives of Cheshire) | Nominated |
| 2020 | National Reality Television Awards | Reality Personality of the Year | Tanya Bardsley (The Real Housewives of Cheshire) | Nominated |
| 2020 | National Reality Television Awards | Best Female Personality | Tanya Bardsley (The Real Housewives of Cheshire) | Nominated |
| 2020 | National Reality Television Awards | Celebrity Personality of the Year | Nicole Sealey (The Real Housewives of Cheshire) | Nominated |
| 2021 | People's Choice Awards | The Reality Show of 2021 | The Real Housewives of Atlanta | Nominated |
| 2021 | People's Choice Awards | The Reality Show of 2021 | The Real Housewives of Beverly Hills | Nominated |
| 2021 | People's Choice Awards | The Reality Star of 2021 | Kandi Burruss (The Real Housewives of Atlanta) | Nominated |
| 2021 | People's Choice Awards | The Reality Star of 2021 | Lisa Rinna (The Real Housewives of Beverly Hills) | Nominated |
| 2021 | MTV Movie & TV Awards | Best Reality Cast | The Real Housewives of Atlanta | Nominated |
| 2021 | MTV Movie & TV Awards | Best New Unscripted Series | The Real Housewives of Salt Lake City | Nominated |
| 2021 | MTV Movie & TV Awards | Best Fight | Jackie Goldschneider vs. Teresa Giudice (The Real Housewives of New Jersey) | Nominated |
| 2021 | AACTA Awards | Best Reality Series | The Real Housewives of Melbourne | Nominated |
| 2021 | National Reality Television Awards | Best Reality Non-Competition Show | The Real Housewives of Cheshire | Nominated |
| 2021 | National Reality Television Awards | Reality Personality of the Year | Seema Malhotra (The Real Housewives of Cheshire) | Nominated |
| 2021 | National Reality Television Awards | Reality Personality of the Year | Tanya Bardsley (The Real Housewives of Cheshire) | Nominated |
| 2021 | National Reality Television Awards | Best Female Personality | Tanya Bardsley (The Real Housewives of Cheshire) | Nominated |
| 2021 | National Reality Television Awards | Celebrity Personality of the Year | Nicole Sealey (The Real Housewives of Cheshire) | Nominated |
| 2022 | MTV Movie & TV Awards | Best Docu-Reality Show | The Real Housewives of Beverly Hills | Nominated |
| 2022 | MTV Movie & TV Awards | Best Unscripted Series | The Real Housewives Ultimate Girls Trip | Nominated |
| 2022 | MTV Movie & TV Awards | Best Reality Star | Teresa Giudice (The Real Housewives of New Jersey) | Nominated |
| 2022 | MTV Movie & TV Awards | Best Fight | Candiace Dillard Bassett vs. Mia Thornton (The Real Housewives of Potomac) | Nominated |
| 2022 | MTV Movie & TV Awards | Best Fight | Margaret Josephs vs. Teresa Giudice (The Real Housewives of New Jersey) | Nominated |
| 2022 | MTV Movie & TV Awards | Best Reality Romance | Tom Sandoval and Ariana Madix (Vanderpump Rules) | Nominated |
| 2022 | Critics' Choice Real TV Awards | Unstructured Series | The Real Housewives of Beverly Hills | Nominated |
| 2022 | Critics' Choice Real TV Awards | Best Ensemble Cast in an Unscripted Series | The Real Housewives of Beverly Hills | Nominated |
| 2022 | TCA Award | Outstanding Achievement in Reality Programming | The Real Housewives of Salt Lake City | Nominated |
| 2022 | People's Choice Awards | The Reality Show of 2022 | The Real Housewives of Atlanta | Nominated |
| 2022 | People's Choice Awards | The Reality Show of 2022 | The Real Housewives of Beverly Hills | Nominated |
| 2022 | People's Choice Awards | The Reality TV Star of 2022 | Garcelle Beauvais (The Real Housewives of Beverly Hills) | Nominated |
| 2022 | People's Choice Awards | The Reality TV Star of 2022 | Kandi Burruss (The Real Housewives of Atlanta) | Nominated |
| 2022 | People's Choice Awards | The Reality TV Star of 2022 | Kenya Moore (The Real Housewives of Atlanta) | Nominated |
| 2022 | People's Choice Awards | The Reality TV Star of 2022 | Kyle Richards (The Real Housewives of Beverly Hills) | Nominated |
| 2022 | National Reality TV Awards | Best Reality Non-Competition Show | The Real Housewives of Cheshire | Nominated |
| 2023 | MTV Movie & TV Awards | Best Docu-Reality Show | The Real Housewives of Beverly Hills | Nominated |
| 2023 | MTV Movie & TV Awards | Best Docu-Reality Show | Vanderpump Rules | Nominated |
| 2023 | MTV Movie & TV Awards | Best Reality On-Screen Team | Garcelle Beauvais and Sutton Stracke (The Real Housewives of Beverly Hills) | Nominated |
| 2023 | MTV Movie & TV Awards | Best Reality On-Screen Team | Ariana Madix, Katie Maloney, Scheana Shay, LaLa Kent (Vanderpump Rules) | Won |
| 2023 | Critics' Choice Real TV Awards | Best Unscripted Series | Vanderpump Rules | Won |
| 2023 | Critics' Choice Real TV Awards | Best Ensemble Cast in an Unscripted Series | Vanderpump Rules | Nominated |
| 2023 | National Reality TV Awards | Best Reality Non-Competition Show | The Real Housewives of Cheshire | Pending |
| 2023 | National Reality TV Awards | Best Female Personality | Lystra Adams (The Real Housewives of Cheshire) | Pending |
| 2023 | National Reality TV Awards | Best Female Personality | Natasha Hamilton (The Real Housewives of Cheshire) | Pending |
| 2023 | Primetime Creative Arts Emmy Awards | Outstanding Unstructured Reality Program | Vanderpump Rules | Nominated |
| 2023 | Primetime Creative Arts Emmy Awards | Outstanding Picture Editing for an Unstructured Reality Program | Jesse Friedman, Tom McCudden, Ramin Mortazavi, Christian Le Guilloux, Paul Peltekian, Sax Eno and Robert Garry (Vanderpump Rules) | Nominated |

== See also ==
- List of The Real Housewives cast members
