= Die Real Housewives van die Wynlande =

2023 South African Afrikaans reality television series

- Genre: Reality television
- Based on: The Real Housewives
- Presented by: Armand Aucamp
- Starring: Candice Bester; Amy Kleinhans; Anita Lloyd; Karen Schwendtke; Mariska Thorpe; Michelle van Zyl
- Country of origin: South Africa
- Original language: Afrikaans
- No. of seasons: 1
- No. of episodes: 14

Production
- Production locations: Cape Winelands, Western Cape, South Africa
- Production company: Red Pepper Pictures

Original release
- Network: kykNET
- Release: 20 April – 20 July 2023

Die Real Housewives van die Wynlande (English: The Real Housewives of the Cape Winelands), often abbreviated as RHOWL, is an Afrikaans reality television series that premiered on kykNET on 20 April 2023. Created as an international installment of The Real Housewives franchise, it documents the personal and professional lives of several Afrikaans speaking women residing in the Cape Winelands in the Greater Metropolitan area of Cape Town as well as near and in Cape Town.

Developed as the sixth installment in The Real Housewives franchise to be produced in South Africa, it is the second Afikaans-language series of the franchise after The Real Housewives of Pretoria. This is also the second iteration of The Real Housewives in the Cape Winelands/Cape Town, South Africa after the English language franchise, The Real Housewives of Cape Town, on Mzansi Magic from July 2022.

The series consisted of original cast members: Candice Bester, Amy Kleinhans, Anita Lloyd, Karen Schwendtke, Mariska Thorpe, and Michelle van Zyl, with Nicole Wilmans serving as a "friend of the housewives".

The series is also available to stream on Showmax.

== Cast ==
=== Main ===
- Candice Bester
- Amy Kleinhans
- Anita Lloyd
- Karen Schwendtke
- Mariska Thorpe
- Michelle van Zyl

=== Recurring ===
- Nicole Wilmans

== Episodes ==
No.	Title	Original release date
1	"Vonkelwyn"	20 April 2023
Michelle heard a juicy story about Karen and Amy invites the women to the launch of her new sparkling wine. Mariska and Anita's first meeting does not go smoothly.
2	"Egskeidingspartytjie"	27 April 2023
At a spa day, Michelle shares some naughty aesthetic secrets with Anita and Amy. Karen throws a divorce party and the women find out why Karen is divorced.
3	"Naweek In Die Bos - Deel 1"	4 May 2023
Karen surprises the women with a weekend getaway in the bushveld but Candice is worried about the cell phone signal and Wi-Fi. Karen's patience is running out with the women who complain about everything.
4	"Naweek In Die Bos - Deel 2"	11 May 2023
The women tease Michelle about her ailments and Mariska arrives a day late. After a game drive, the temperatures are not only high in the bush but also in Karen's blood.
5	"TikTok Piekniek"	18 May 2023
Amy tries to bring peace between Karen and Mariska. Michelle has a surprise for the women at her picnic and Anita makes an unexpected announcement.
6	"Casino Royale"	25 May 2023
Mariska's secret comes out. Karen and Mariska tries to make peace. Some of the woman keeps a perfect poker face, and some just try to keep up with the game.
7	"Verjaarsdagpartyjie"	1 June 2023
Michelle goes on an inner journey to let go of issues from the past. The women roll some balls at Mariska's birthday party but is there a storm brewing in the winelands?
8	"Enigma Glanspartytjie"	8 June 2023
Amy invites the women on a yacht and Candice shares news about her career. The women go to a glamorous party at Amy's friend's famous Enigma Mansion in Camps Bay.
9	"De Vier"	15 June 2023
The women's cocktail party at Amy's friend, Gloria's, house comes to a dramatic end. Candice invites the women to a meal on the grounds of her new restaurant.
10	"Mauritius - Deel 1"	22 June 2023
Mariska suggests that the women go to Mauritius for a week. The women talk openly about their difficult pasts and tensions arise between two distinct factions in the group.
11	"Mauritius - Deel 2"	29 June 2023
The women go big in Mauritius and Amy opens up about an event in her past that had a big impact on her life. Tension between Amy and Anita runs high.
12	"Bekendstelling Funksie"	6 July 2023
It's the big event where Amy officially releases her MCC, Mariska gets all six women on the catwalk for the launch of 'SELF-ie' and Candice launches her new single.
13	"Reünie - Deel 1"	13 July 2023
In part one of the reunion episodes, the women get an opportunity to clear up what bothered them about each other and possible questions that the viewers had are addressed.
14	"Reünie - Deel 2"	20 July 2023
In part two of the reunion episodes, an unexpected guest surprises the women on set and later heated discussions take place between some of the women.
