= Date My Ex: Jo & Slade =

Television series

- Genre: Reality
- Starring: Jo De La Rosa; Slade Smiley
- Country of origin: United States
- Original language: English
- No. of seasons: 1
- No. of episodes: 8

Production
- Executive producers: Douglas Ross; Gregory Stewart; Kathleen French
- Running time: 42 minutes
- Production company: Evolution Media

Original release
- Network: Bravo
- Release: July 21 – September 8, 2008

Related
- The Real Housewives of Orange County

Date My Ex: Jo & Slade is an American reality television show that premiered on Bravo on July 21, 2008. Developed as the first spin-off in The Real Housewives franchise, it focuses on the dating life of Jo De La Rosa, from the reality television show The Real Housewives of Orange County.

== Premise ==
Three contestants are invited into Slade's house, every week to live with him and compete for Jo's heart. Every day, one of Jo's friends delivers to her house a red and white polka dot box containing a note and a clue hinting at the day's events. Each of the three guys takes Jo out on a unique date, close to his own heart. However, what none of them know is that Slade can watch the dates. After all of the dates, Jo chooses one of the guys to stay in Slade's house and go on a second date with her, while the others are told, "I think we should just be friends", and they have to leave the house immediately.

== Cast ==
- Jo De La Rosa
- Slade Smiley
- Myia Ingoldsby
- Katy Metz
- Lucas James Joyce
- Chris Gersch

== Episodes ==
No.	Title	Original release date
0	"Jo and Slade: The Break Up"	June 30, 2008
1	"I Can't Believe I'm On A Dating Show"	July 21, 2008
Winner: David; Eliminated: Martin, Michael, Nelson; Episode 1 starts out with the four guys' being brought to the house and introduced to Slade after the news that their brief residence is, in fact, his house. They are shown their small living quarters, 4 twin beds in a cramped room with one bathroom. They have all planned dates and Martin, the real estate salesman, goes first. He takes Jo to a restaurant, which he has shut down just for them. He cooks her a meal in the restaurant's kitchen with minimal help from Jo. They then go dancing in the restaurant. She reveals that she likes a man in an apron but doesn't like that she had hardly talked. Slade agrees with Myia that Jo has hardly put a word in. When Martin gets back he refuses to talk about the date. Slade wakes Michael up in the morning and Michael says, "It's weird to be woken up by the ex-fiance of the woman you are trying to pursue." He takes Jo out on a boat to teach her to fish. Jo only catches a small fish but seems satisfied. Michael teaches her how to gut a fish, much to her displeasure. They then go out on the bow of the boat and have breakfast. Not unlike Martin, Michael refuses to talk about his date. David's date starts with his blindfolding Joe with a Louis Vuitton scarf and leading her up to the roof, where awaiting them is a private helicopter and champagne. Jo calls Martin cocky. They enjoy champagne then climb into the helicopter for a ride around Los Angeles. It appears that Slade doesn't like David's date with Jo. It is dark when he returns to the house, but he is open and willing to talk about his date. Nelson's date with Jo is rockclimbing on a beach. Jo tells him that she has always wanted to rock climb. As Nelson climbs up the rock, Jo makes the comment, "Your butt looks cute from here". He makes it to the top then lets Jo try. Nelson gives Jo the same compliment as she climbs. The last part of the date is shooting each other with water guns on the beach. Slade approaches David before elimination and tells him that he doesn't feel that he can trust him and that he is to drop out. At elimination, the four guys are allowed one last comment to Jo and David appears to drop out but instead makes a comment like everyone else and is chosen in the end.
2	"I'm Ready To Be Romanticized"	July 28, 2008
Winner: Lucas; Eliminated: Ali, Tyler; Jo is nervous for her next round of dates with new suitors Tyler, Lucas and Ali. Meanwhile, Slade continues to agitate the guys back at the house. Tyler teaches Jo how to shoot a gun, but the only sparks that fly are from the gunpowder. Lucas and Jo flirt their way around a golf course. Ali and Jo bond over their shared passion for music. Later, at a BBQ at the house, the whole gang is upset when they learn that Lucas lied. In the end, Lucas is chosen by Jo to go on a second date with her.
3	"Katy, I Just Can't Decide"	August 4, 2008
Winner: Zack; Eliminated: Andre, Steve; Jo's next round of suitors is Zack, Steve and Andre. Model Zack arranges a sexy photo shoot with Jo, sweet Steve brings his Midwest charm to Los Angeles by creating a winter wonderland in the middle of a park, and Andre purchases expensive perfume for Jo. But a vicious rumor that one of the new guys has a crush on Jo's best friend, Myia, sends Jo over the edge at the pool party. At the same time, watching Jo flirt with her many past and present suitors proves to be too much for a jealous Slade, who storms out of the house. In the end, Jo gives Zack a second chance to impress her on their second date.
4	"A Typical Latina?"	August 11, 2008
5	"There is No Game, David"	August 18, 2008
6	"I'm Springing a Hot Date On You"	August 25, 2008
7	"I Think We Should Just Be Friends"	September 1, 2008
8	"I Have to Follow My Heart"	September 8, 2008
