= Thobile Khumalo =

South African television personality (born 1989)

- Khumalo in 2026
- Born: Thobile Khumalo; February 21, 1989 (age 37); KwaMadlala, KwaZulu Natal
- Education: University of Zululand
- Occupations: Television presenter; businesswoman; radio presenter
- Spouse: Musa Mseleku (m. 2008)
- Children: 1

Thobile Khumalo Mseleku (née Khumalo; born 21 February 1989) is a South African television personality, businesswoman and radio presenter. She rose to prominence after starring on the Mzansi Magic reality television series Uthando Nes'thembu.

== Life and career ==
Khumalo was born to a steady family in KwaZulu-Natal from KwaMadlala. She graduated from University of Zulu Land where she obtained a degree in Communication studies.

Khumalo made her debut television as starring in one of popular reality television series Uthando Nes'thembu. She has work in multiple television production including The Real Housewives of Durban in early 2022 as a starring cast, Ezomashado and serving as the executive producer of Uthando Nes'thembu. She also worked as an on air radio broadcaster on Vuma FM and the international acclaimed Ukhozi FM.

== Personal life ==
In 2008, Khumalo married with famous polygamist man Musa Mseleku when she was 19 years old. She was formally inducted as the Musa's 3rd wife after Nokukhanya MaYeni Mseleku as 2nd wife and Busisiwe MaCele Mseleku as the first wife, and she was later followed Mbali MaNgwabe Mseleku as the new sister wife inducted in 4th position. She has adopted Musa's daughter Mpiloenhle Zungu Mseleku as her only child.

Khumalo's fertility impediment has been major conversation in her in laws and the family reality television series Uthando Nes'thembu. In 2020, she was informed of the in vitro fertilisation procedure.
