= The Real Housewives of Athens =

Greek reality television series

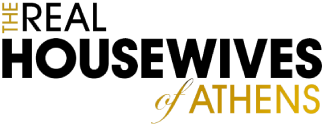
- Genre: Reality television
- Based on: The Real Housewives
- Starring: Ioanna Soulioti; Orthoula Papadakou; Annita Nathanail; Fofi Mastrokosta; Christina Papa; Joe Satratzemi Togou
- Country of origin: Greece
- Original language: Greek
- No. of seasons: 1
- No. of episodes: 12

Production
- Executive producer: Marc Jansen
- Producer: Vasiliki Kyriakopoulou
- Production location: Athens
- Camera setup: 48 minutes
- Production company: Big Sun Media Solutions

Original release
- Network: ANT1
- Release: March 4 – May 27, 2011

The Real Housewives of Athens (abbreviated RHOAthens) is a Greek reality television series that debuted on ANT1 on March 4, 2011, until May 27, 2011. Developed as the first international installment of the Real Housewives franchise, it aired only one season and documented the personal and professional lives of several women residing in Athens, Greece. After 13 years, the series came back in late 2024 with its second season on ANT1, as an external production in courtesy of Bravo.

== Overview and casting ==
The series chronicles the lives of six Greek women. The show aired in the midst of the Greek government-debt crisis and faced criticism for its tone of luxurious living in hard economic times. Writing after the show was cancelled, The New York Times commented that the show "barely lasted one season, and it doesn't take long to see why. The Greek adaptation had a depressive undertone that might have matched the national mood, but didn't provide viewers with a frothy escapist kick. Wealthy Greeks aren't flaunting their lifestyles these days..."

The series was not subsequently renewed and remained a one-season series.

== Cast ==
- Ioanna Soulioti
- Orthoula Papadakou
- Annita Nathanail
- Fofi Mastrokosta
- Christina Papa
- Joe Satratzemi Togou
