= The Real Housewives of Abuja =

Nigerian reality TV series

- Genre: Reality Television
- Based on: The Real Housewives
- Starring: Arafa; Comfort Booth; OJ Posharella; Princess Jecoco; Samantha Homossany; Tutupie
- Country of origin: Nigeria
- Original language: English
- No. of seasons: 1
- No. of episodes: 10

Production
- Production location: Abuja, Nigeria
- Camera setup: Multiple
- Production company: Delmedia Productions

Original release
- Network: Showmax
- Release: 17 February 2023

Related
- The Real Housewives of Lagos; The Real Housewives of Durban

The Real Housewives of Abuja, abbreviated as RHOAbuja, is a Nigerian reality television series that premiered on 17 February 2023, exclusively on Showmax. It is the second Nigerian installment of The Real Housewives franchise, following The Real Housewives of Lagos. The show follows the extravagant lifestyles, social connections, and personal stories of six influential women in Abuja, Nigeria's capital city known for its wealth and power.

== Overview ==
The Real Housewives of Abuja gives viewers a glimpse into the luxurious and high-profile lives of six women as they navigate friendships, businesses, relationships, and social events in Abuja. The cast includes Arafa, Comfort Booth, OJ Posharella, Princess Jecoco, Samantha Homossany, and Tutupie.

The show offers exclusive access to the elite circles of Abuja, showcasing its extravagant parties, high-end fashion, and dramatic conflicts among the women.

== Cast ==
- Arafa
- Comfort Booth
- OJ Posharella
- Princess Jecoco
- Samantha Homossany
- Tutupie

== Production ==
The series is produced by Delmwa Deshi-Kura of Delmedia Productions. It is available for streaming in over 40 African countries on Showmax.

== See also ==
- The Real Housewives of Lagos
- The Real Housewives of Durban
