= Phat Joe =

South African Radio personality and tv personality

- Born: Majota Mandlakayise Isaac Khambule; 4 December 1974 (age 51); Pretoria, South Africa
- Education: University of Cape Town; University of North Carolina
- Occupations: Radio personality; TV personality; Businessman
- Years active: 1995–present
- Spouse: Palesa Morgan (m. 2016)
- Children: 2

Phat Joe is a South African TV and radio personality. He is the host of a late night show, The Phat Joe Show.

The Phat Joe Live Show was on the free-to-air channel, eTV, from 1999 to 2001. It was a major spin-off for him as he was still hosting his popular show on the regional station YFM. The show then moved to the national broadcaster's channel SABC1 in 2001 and it lasted until 2005. He regularly featured David Kau on a comedy slot called "Little Brown Kau". Andy "Admiral" Kasrils, a popular Ragga DJ and artist (Admiral and Jahseed duo), reviewed movies on the show, weekly. Admiral is the son of politician Ronnie Kasrils. Deon "Grandmaster Ready D" Daniels was the resident DJ on the show when he was not on tour with any of his groups, one being Prophets Of the City (POC).

He was also host of the first season of the gossip show The Real Goboza, and the dating shows Take Me Out: South Africa, on SABC1 in 2014, and Take Me Out: Mzansi, on Vuzu Amp in 2017. He also presented the second season of The Real Housewives of Johannesburg and television show Temptation Island in 2021. In 2024, Joe, along with his wife Palesa Morgan, launched the 2 Ocean's International Film and Television Studio. The Studio will break ground in 2025 and include 10 soundstages with a mixed use precinct to be located in Cape Town South Africa.

== Filmography ==
=== Television ===
Year	Film	Role	Notes
1991 - 2001	The Phat Joe Live Show (eTV)	Himself	Host
2001 - 2005	The Phat Joe Live Show (SABC1)	Himself	Host
2010-2017	Real Goboza	Phat Joe	Host
2021	Temptation Island	Himself	Host
2021	The Real Housewives of Durban	Himself	Host (Reunion, 2 episodes)

== Awards and nominations ==
Year	Awards Ceremony	Category	Results	Ref.
2017	DStv Mzansi Viewers' Choice Awards	Favourite TV Presenter	Nominated	
