= The Real Housewives of Cape Town =

South African reality TV series

- Genre: Reality television
- Based on: The Real Housewives
- Presented by: Vusi Twala
- Starring: Beverley Steyn; Camilla McDowell; Kutazwa "Rooksy" Gqirana; Loveline "Mrs. Leo" Abinokhauno; Lulwando "Lue" Tukwayo; Rushda Moosajee; Thato Montse
- Country of origin: South Africa
- Original language: English
- No. of seasons: 1
- No. of episodes: 14

Production
- Production locations: Cape Town, Western Cape, South Africa
- Production company: Trace Studios

Original release
- Network: Mzansi Magic
- Release: 10 July 2022 – present

The Real Housewives of Cape Town, often abbreviated as RHOCT, is a South African reality television series that premiered on Mzansi Magic on 10 July 2022. Created as an international installment of the Real Housewives franchise, it documents the personal and professional lives of several English speaking women residing in Cape Town. This is also the third South African version of The Real Housewives. This series is the 26th international installment of the American series The Real Housewives.

This series is the fourth iteration of the Real Housewives format in Africa (third in South Africa alone), with the others including Johannesburg, Durban and Lagos. The second iteration of a Cape Town franchise for The Real Housewives will air in Afrikaans with The Real Housewives of the Cape Winelands airing on KykNET from April 2023.

The first season was produced by Trace Studios and directed by Kgosana Monchusi. The franchise is distributed internationally by NBCUniversal Formats, which is part of Universal International Studios, a division of Universal Studio Group.

The show follows the lives of 7 women living in Cape Town as they navigate personal and professional life. The series consisted of original cast members: Beverley Steyn, Camilla McDowell, Kutazwa "Rooksy" Gqirana, Loveline "Mrs Leo" Abinokhauno, Lulwando "Lue" Tukwayo, Rushada Moosajee and Thato Montse.

The series is also available to stream on Showmax in Africa, and on Hayu in Europe.

== Cast ==
Main cast members
Cast member	Seasons	
Cast member	1	2
Beverly Steyn	Main	TBA
Camilla McDowell	Main	TBA
Kutazwa "Rooksy" Gqirana	Main	TBA
Loveline "Mrs. Leo" Abinokhauno	Main	TBA
Lulwando "Lue" Tukwayo	Main	TBA
Rushda Moosajee	Main	TBA
Thato Montse	Main	TBA
Friends of the housewives
Laverne Turner-Manuel		TBA

== Episodes ==
No.	Title	Original release date
1	"Episode 1"	10 July 2022
2	"Episode 2"	17 July 2022
3	"Episode 3"	24 July 2022
4	"Episode 4"	31 July 2022
5	"Episode 5"	7 August 2022
6	"Episode 6"	14 August 2022
7	"Episode 7"	21 August 2022
8	"Episode 8"	28 August 2022
9	"Episode 9"	4 September 2022
10	"Episode 10"	11 September 2022
11	"Episode 11"	18 September 2022
12	"Episode 12"	25 September 2022
13	"Episode 13"	2 October 2022
14	"Episode 14"	9 October 2022
