= Dplay =

Former video streaming service by Discovery

- Developer: Discovery, Inc.
- Successor: Discovery+
- Available in: English (dplay.co.uk); Danish (dplay.dk); Dutch (nl.dplay.com); Finnish (dplay.fi); Italian (it.dplay.com); Japanese (dplay.jp); Norwegian (dplay.no); Spanish (es.dplay.com); Swedish (dplay.se)
- Website: www.dplay.com

Dplay (stylized as dplay) was a brand name of online video on demand services operated by Discovery, Inc. Discovery operated such services under the Dplay name in Italy, Japan, Netherlands, Nordic countries (Denmark, Finland, Norway and Sweden) and Spain. In October 2020, Discovery announced that it would rebrand its Dplay service as Discovery+ (stylized as discovery+) in the United Kingdom and Ireland, the new service commenced in November 2020 and also offers paid content as well as the free content from Dplay. In December 2020, Discovery announced that a separate version of Discovery+ would also be launching in other European countries and the United States in January 2021. On January 5, 2021, Dplay was replaced by Discovery+ in Europe.

== History ==
The British version of the service (also available in the Republic of Ireland) was originally launched as QuestOD in 2018 as a Video on Demand to Discovery's free-to-air television channels Quest and Quest Red. The launch of QuestOD, along with the HD simulcast version of Quest on July 31, 2018, was to coincide with the 2018–19 EFL season, which Quest had rights for free-to-air highlights beginning from that season.

In October 2019, QuestOD announced that the service would change its name to Dplay by the end of that month. The renaming coincided with the addition of programmes from Discovery's free-to-air sister channels in the UK, DMAX and Food Network, in addition to Home (later renamed HGTV) and Really — the latter two were then-recently acquired by Discovery, Inc. following the split of UKTV (who operates UKTV Play). The rebranding took place on October 22, 2019.

In October 2020, Dplay announced that the service would be renamed Discovery+ (stylized as discovery+) in the United Kingdom and Ireland in the following month. The rebranding coincided with the launch of a subscription tier, bringing Discovery's pay-TV and free-to-air channels all together.

In December 2020, Discovery announced that a separate version of Discovery+ would be officially launching in the United States in January 2021.

On January 4, 2021, Dplay was shut down in Japan. It was relaunched as Max on September 25, 2024 before it reverted into HBO Max on July 9, 2025.

On January 5, 2021, Dplay was replaced by Discovery+ in Europe.
