= The Real Housewives of Pretoria =

2022 South African Afrikaans reality television series

- Die Real Housewives van Pretoria
- Genre: Reality television
- Based on: The Real Housewives
- Presented by: Rian van Heerden
- Starring: Marié Bosman; Rhona Erasmus; Renske Lammerding; Talana Veren-Kuhn; Melany "Mel" Viljoen; Karlien "Kiki La Coco" Wentzel
- Country of origin: South Africa
- Original language: Afrikaans
- No. of seasons: 1
- No. of episodes: 14

Production
- Production locations: Pretoria, Gauteng, South Africa
- Production company: Provoco

Original release
- Network: kykNET
- Release: 13 October 2022 – 12 January 2023

The Real Housewives of Pretoria (Afrikaans: Die Real Housewives van Pretoria), often abbreviated as RHOPTA, is an Afrikaans reality television series that premiered on kykNET on 13 October 2022. Created as an international installment of The Real Housewives franchise, it documents the personal and professional lives of several women residing in Pretoria.

Developed as the fourth installment in The Real Housewives franchise to be produced in South Africa, it is also the first Afrikaans-language series of the franchise and is the twenty-seventh international installment overall. A second Afrikaans-language series, The Real Housewives of the Cape Winelands, premiered on kykNET in April 2023.

The series consisted of original cast members: Marié Bosman, Rhona Erasmus, Renske Lammerding, Talana Veren-Kuhn, Melany "Mel" Viljoen, and Karlien "Kiki La Coco" Wentzel.

On 12 March 2026, it was reported that Viljoen and her husband Petrus ("Peet") had shoplifted $5,300 worth of groceries from August 2025 to March 2026, which led to their arrests.

The series is also available to stream on Showmax.

== Cast ==
- Marié Bosman
- Rhona Erasmus
- Renske Lammerding
- Talana Veren-Kuhn
- Melany "Mel" Viljoen
- Karlien "Kiki La Coco" Wentzel

== Episodes ==
No.	Title	Original release date
1	"Stokvel"	13 October 2022
Karlien ("Kiki") is looking for a house in Pretoria. She meets Renske who invites her to a Stokvel where things don't turn out as planned.
2	"Geslag-onthulling"	20 October 2022
It's time for Talana's gender reveal and she's nervous about how things will turn out after the awkward situation at the stokvel. Melany ("Mel") and her husband, Petrus ("Peet"), discuss the night he was on everyone's lips.
3	"Wedren"	27 October 2022
It's almost time for Mel and Kiki's big race in their G-Wagons. Peet has a big surprise for Mel and Rhona has future plans for the women that will cause more drama.
4	"Staptog"	3 November 2022
Kiki meets with Afrikaans rapper Loufi to work on her song. Mel struggles to find the right clothes to take with her on the hike, which unfortunately ends with a big fight between the ladies.
5	"Kunsaand"	10 November 2022
Renske is more upset about the fight on the hike than she was about letting it go. Mel has to help out with a nail emergency. Everyone shows up for Marié's art night. What will they think of her surprise?
6	"Diamond Nail Day"	17 November 2022
Thembi joins Kiki to help with the house search, because they need to find something that Kiki's husband, Malcolm, will like too. It's the day of Mel's Diamond Nail Day and everyone wonders if Peet will show up.
7	"Ou Klere-funksie"	24 November 2022
Kiki and Mel attend a famous boxing match where Mel begins to question Kiki's true intentions. At Rhona's Old Clothes function, an uninvited guest shows up who doesn't impress everyone.
8	"Plaas Kuier"	1 December 2022
Everyone takes a private flight to Renske and Heinrich's game farm where a competition awaits that doesn't make everyone stick to the rules. Mel and Kiki confront Marié over a controversial video of her.
9	"Zanzibar Deel 1"	8 December 2022
Renske's suggestion that everyone go to Zanzibar turns out to be problematic. A skirmish between Rhona and Mel on the way to a boat trip is just the beginning of more drama on the high seas.
10	"Zanzibar Deel 2"	15 December 2022
The women are still in Zanzibar, reflecting on the drama during the boat trip. Mel wants to discuss an issue with Kiki that has been bothering her for a long time. During dinner, Rhona confronts Mel about Peet.
11	"Elegante Funksie"	22 December 2022
After the dramatic events in Zanzibar, the women return home and prepare for Kiki's elegant function. It's clear that Kiki is up to something and that a few surprises await.
12	"Markdag"	29 December 2022
Mel arrives at Rhona's spa where a big surprise awaits. Everyone is preparing for market day at Renske's house and Peet decides to invite himself. The question is on what note will this end?
13	"Reünie Deel 1"	5 January 2023
The Housewives come together for their reunion where they talk to the show's producer, Rian van Heerden, about their journey so far and what really happened behind the scenes.
14	"Reünie Deel 2"	12 January 2023
The 'seventh housewife', Peet (Melany's husband), makes an appearance. The shock of Zanzibar is discussed and Malcolm (Kiki's husband) has a few words for the critics.
