= Discovery+ =

American video streaming service

- Logo used since 2021

- Screenshot Discovery+ homepage on January 4, 2021
- Website type: OTT streaming platform
- Available in: 11 languages
- List of languages: Arabic; English; French; German; Hindi; Polish; Portuguese; Russian; Spanish; Tamil; Telugu
- Founded: March 23, 2020; 6 years ago
- Dissolved: List: April 27, 2023; 3 years ago (Philippines); December 9, 2024; 23 months ago (Denmark, Finland, the Netherlands, and Spain); February 6, 2025; 21 months ago (Brazil); April 15, 2025; 19 months ago (Turkey); November 3, 2026; 16 days ago (India)
- Predecessors: List: Dplay; MotorTrend+; GCN+; GolfTV; Eurosport Player; CNN+; B/R Live
- Successor: HBO Max (most countries)
- Country of origin: United States
- Area served: Austria, Germany, India, Ireland, Italy, Middle East and North Africa, Norway, Sweden, United Kingdom, United States (see full list of countries)
- Owners: Discovery, Inc. (2021-2022); Warner Bros. Discovery (2022-2026); Skydance (2026-present)
- Key people: Casey Bloys and Jean-Briac Perrette (co-CEOs, Skydance Direct-to-Consumer)
- Industry: Entertainment; mass media
- Products: Streaming media; video on demand; digital distribution
- Services: Film production; Film distribution; Television production; Television distribution
- Parent: Skydance Direct-to-Consumer
- Website: www.discoveryplus.com
- Registration: Required/Free (content varies in most countries)
- Users: ▲24 million (as of March 31, 2022)
- Launched: January 4, 2021; 5 years ago
- Current status: Active

Discovery+ is an American multinational subscription video on-demand over-the-top streaming service owned by Skydance. The service focuses on factual programming drawn from the libraries of Discovery's main channel brands, as well as original series (including spin-offs of programs from Discovery's television networks), and content from A&E Networks, NBCUniversal, and Discovery+'s corporate sibling CNN.

It was first launched in India on March 23, 2020. It launched in the United States on January 4, 2021, and replaced Discovery's Dplay and Eurosport Player services in Europe the next day. As of April 1, 2022, Discovery+ has 24 million subscribers.

Discovery+ became a sister service to HBO Max following the merger between HBO Max's parent company, WarnerMedia and Discovery, Inc. in April 2022, which formed Warner Bros. Discovery. HBO Max was relaunched as Max the following year (and reverted back to its original name in 2025), adding Discovery content to its library. While WBD originally planned to discontinue Discovery+ in favor of HBO Max, the company elected to continue offering Discovery+ because it was still profitable. Following the 2026 acquisition of WBD by Paramount Skydance (now Skydance), Discovery+ and HBO Max became sister services to Paramount+ and Pluto TV.

== History ==
Discovery first launched Discovery+ in India on March 23, 2020, and included content from Discovery's various brands. In September of the same year, Discovery announced plans to launch an international version of Discovery+ in early 2021.

In October 2020, it was announced that Dplay would be renamed Discovery+ in the United Kingdom and Ireland in the following month.

On January 4, 2021, Discovery+ launched in the U.S. with both a paid ad-supported plan and an ad-free plan. On January 5, 2021, Discovery+ launched in eight European territories, subsuming Dplay and the Eurosport Player services.

In an earnings call on November 3, 2021, president and CEO of Discovery Streaming and International JB Perrette discussed potential options for the service following the then-proposed spin-off and merger of AT&T's WarnerMedia into Discovery to form Warner Bros. Discovery. These involved a bundling and/or eventual merger of Discovery+ with WarnerMedia's streaming service HBO Max, and offering such a merged service in markets where Discovery+ has yet to launch, such as other parts of the Asia-Pacific region. On March 14, 2022, after Discovery shareholders approved the merger, CFO Gunnar Wiedenfels stated that the merged company planned to pursue a merger of HBO Max with Discovery+ as a long-term goal, following the process proposed by Perrette earlier. Following the merger, selected Discovery library programs had begun to appear on HBO Max.

In August 2022, Perrette announced that a merged service would launch in the United States "next summer", if not sooner, followed by Latin America in late 2023, HBO Max's European markets in early 2024, and additional Asia-Pacific and European markets. Perrette stated that HBO Max and Discovery+ had complimentary scopes targeting "appointment viewing" and "comfort viewing" respectively, and thus described the unified service as being "an unprecedented combination in an already crowded market." In November 2022, it was announced that the new service would now launch in spring 2023. In early December 2022, it was reported by CNBC via inside sources that the unified platform was being developed under the codename "BEAM", and that multiple names were being considered—including simply "Max".

In February 2023, Zaslav stated during an earnings call that WBD no longer planned to shut down Discovery+ in favor of the merged service, due to its profitability and low churn. He explained that its customers were "very happy with the product offering", and asked, "why would we shut that off?". The Wall Street Journal had reported earlier in the month that WBD had planned to continue operating Discovery+ in conjunction with the new service, which was expected to have a higher price than HBO Max, and would feature "most", but not all, of the content of Discovery+. Max was officially unveiled on April 12, 2023, for a US launch on May 23. In contrast to WBD's plans to keep Discovery+ operational in at least the United States, Warner Bros. Discovery Asia-Pacific announced in March 2023 that Discovery+ would be discontinued in the Philippines on April 27, 2023, in favor of the local HBO Go service; WBD had announced an Asia-Pacific launch for Max on November 19, 2024.

In mid-2024, Max launched in 25 European countries, integrating content from Eurosport and Discovery+. Consequently, Discovery+ continued to be wound down in other markets in favor of HBO Max; Discovery+ permanently closed in Denmark, Finland, the Netherlands, and Spain on December 9, 2024, and ceased operations in Brazil on February 6, 2025, and in Turkey on April 15, 2025. In February 2026, Discovery+ was wound down in Canada due to the acquisition of exclusive rights to its programming and brands by Rogers Communications (the service was previously a joint venture with Corus Entertainment).

In early 2026, HBO Max was expected to launch in Austria, Germany, Ireland, Italy, and the United Kingdom, with Discovery+ being integrated into the service. This was to follow the conclusion of the content and distribution agreement between Warner Bros. Discovery and Sky, which was set to expire at the end of 2025.

From 26 March 2026, A Discovery+ Entertainment pay subscription is no longer included for new EE TV customers.

From 3 November 2026, Discovery+ app and website will be discontinued in India.

== Programming ==
=== Original programming ===
Original programming carried by Discovery+ includes spin-offs of programs from Warner Bros. Discovery's networks.

=== Content library ===
The library of Discovery+ is drawn primarily from the original programming of Warner Bros. Discovery's channel brands, including but not limited to Discovery Channel, Animal Planet, TLC, Travel Channel, Magnolia Network, HGTV, Food Network, Investigation Discovery, CNN, and other international brands where applicable such as Asian Food Network.

In the U.S., Discovery+ has also licensed non-scripted programming from A&E Networks—including A&E, History, and Lifetime programs—and NBCUniversal Global Distribution—including American Ninja Warrior, The Biggest Loser, Flipping Out, Queer Eye, The Real Housewives of Melbourne, Cheshire, Johannesburg, Top Chef Canada (which is produced for the Canadian version of Food Network), and WAGS.

On August 4, 2022, WBD announced that a CNN content hub featuring a selection of its original series and documentaries would be added to the service. CNN had attempted to launch a streaming service, CNN+, during the lead-up to the WarnerMedia/Discovery merger, but it was discontinued by Perrette and new CNN head Chris Licht only a month after its launch due to its conflicts with the merged company's OTT strategy.

In October 2022, WBD announced an agreement with Philippine media company ABS-CBN to license lifestyle programming from its pay television channel Metro Channel in Central and Southeast Asia, with distribution via Discovery+, Discovery Asia, and Asian Food Network.

=== Sports ===
In selected European territories, Discovery+ offers sports content via Warner Bros. Discovery's Eurosport and TNT Sports networks, subsuming Eurosport's previous streaming platform Eurosport Player. The service began to subsume GolfTV following its December 2022 shutdown.

In October 2023, BT Group and Warner Bros. Discovery announced that the BT Sport app and web player would close, making Discovery+ the new streaming home for TNT Sports.

In February 2024, MotorTrend+ was shut down and its content and subscribers were migrated to Discovery+.

Since 2024 the sport section of Eurosport was migrated towards HBO Max, in the UK TNT Sports (United Kingdom) migrated from Discovery+ towards HBO Max on 26 March 2026 completing the European migration. But in some countries sport is still available in both Discovery+ and HBO Max.

== Device support and service features ==
Discovery+ is available through traditional Windows/macOS web browsers, the major digital media player platforms (such as Amazon Fire TV, Roku, Apple TV, and Chromecast), Android TV, Xbox One/Series X/S gaming consoles, and through Android and iOS apps.

== Launch ==
Launch rollout timeline
Release date	Country/territory	Status	Release partner(s)
March 23, 2020-November 3, 2026	India	Discontinued	None
October 10, 2020	Ireland	Available	None
October 10, 2020	United Kingdom	Available	BT Group
January 4, 2021	United States	Available	Verizon
January 5, 2021	Italy	Available	Ex-Dplay
January 5, 2021	Norway	Available to Existing subscribers only	Ex-Dplay
January 5, 2021	Sweden	Available to Existing subscribers only	Ex-Dplay
January 5, 2021–December 9, 2024			Ex-Dplay
January 5, 2021–December 9, 2024	Denmark	Discontinued	Ex-Dplay
January 5, 2021–December 9, 2024	Finland	Discontinued	Ex-Dplay
January 5, 2021–December 9, 2024	Netherlands	Discontinued	Ex-Dplay
January 5, 2021–December 9, 2024	Spain	Discontinued	Ex-Dplay
May 5, 2021–April 15, 2025	Turkey	Discontinued	BluTV
October 13, 2021–April 27, 2023	Philippines	Discontinued	Globe
November 9, 2021–February 6, 2025	Brazil	Discontinued	Globoplay, Claro
June 28, 2022	Austria	Available	Sky Group
June 28, 2022	Germany	Available	Sky Group

At the beginning of 2021 it was announced that Discovery+ would become available to Vodafone customers in Romania, Portugal, Greece, Czech Republic, Hungary, and Iceland sometime in the middle of 2022. However, the plans were halted as HBO Max was launched instead in those regions.

== Current distribution partners ==
In the countries below, Discovery+ has a distribution partnership with a local partner, and is unavailable as a standalone service:

Country/territory	Partner (main services)	Status
Azerbaijan Belarus Georgia Kazakhstan Kyrgyzstan Moldova Tajikistan Turkmenistan Ukraine Uzbekistan	MEGOGO	Discontinued
Canada	Rogers Communications	Available
Israel	yes, Sting+	Available
MENA	OSN (OSN+)	Available
Poland	Player (streaming service)	Available
India	Amazon Prime Video, JioTV, JioHotstar, Tata Play, Dish TV, Playbox TV	Available

== Criticism ==
There was criticism of the service at launch by some viewers of the networks and industry analysts, especially concerns that existing Discovery programming is being taken away from cable and satellite viewers and is being placed behind an additional paywall that may be inaccessible to viewers without robust broadband plans, or are in rural areas with little access to broadband, which in turn may imperil future carriage of those channels by Discovery's provider partners. Other viewers have criticized Discovery's bait-and-switch tactics in forcing them to sign up for Discovery+ to have the 'full experience' of a series, as is being done for various Discovery+ spin-offs of 90 Day Fiancé, along with obtrusive Discovery+ advertising throughout the broadcast day (including a lower third sized banner in the top-right corner during actual programming) of many Discovery networks.

== See also ==
- List of streaming media services
