= The Real Housewives of Johannesburg =

Television series

- Genre: Reality
- Based on: The Real Housewives
- Presented by: Moshe Ndiki; Phat Joe; MaBlerh
- Starring: Christall Kay; Brinnette Seopela; Evodia Mogase; Mercy Mogase; Naledi Willers; Busisiwe 'Lendy' Ter Mors; Mpumi Mophatlane; Lebo JoJo Mokoena; Tarina Patel; Lethabo LeJoy Mathatho; Mpho Merriweather; Keabetswe Marema; Thobekile Mdlalose; Nicole Watson; Mamus Koka; Mareli Bentley
- Country of origin: South Africa
- Original languages: English; Xhosa; Tswana
- No. of seasons: 3
- No. of episodes: 42

Production
- Executive producers: Pebbles Gqunta; Christall Kay; Sonia Mbele; Rebone Sesing
- Production locations: Johannesburg, Gauteng, South Africa
- Camera setup: Multiple
- Running time: ~45 minutes
- Production companies: RHOSA Productions (2018–2020); Sonia Mbele Films (2023)

Original release
- Network: 1Magic
- Release: 3 August 2018 – 18 August 2023

Related
- The Real Housewives of Cape Town

The Real Housewives of Johannesburg (abbreviated RHOJ) is a South African reality television series that premiered on M-Net's rebranded channel, 1Magic.

RHOJ was developed as an international installment of the American The Real Housewives franchise and was the first installment of the franchise set in Africa. It has aired three seasons and focuses on the personal and professional lives of several women living in Johannesburg, South Africa.

The cast of the third season consisted of Mareli Bentley, Mamus Koka, Keabetswe Marema, Lethabo LeJoy Mathatho, Lebo JoJo Mokoena, Thobekile Mdlalose and Nicole Watson with Tarina Patel serving as a friend of the housewives. Previously featured cast members included noticeably absent original housewife Christall Kay, original housewives mother and daughter Evodia and Mercy Mogase, Brinnette Seopela, Naledi Willers, Busisiwe 'Lendy' Ter Mors and Sophomore housewives Mpho Merriweather and Mpumi Mophatlane.

== Cast ==
=== Timeline of cast members ===
Main cast members
Cast member	Seasons		
Cast member	1	2	3
Christall Kay	Main	Main	
Brinnette Seopela	Main	Main	
Evodia Mogase	Main		
Mercy Mogase	Main		
Busisiwe 'Lendy' Ter Mors	Main		
Naledi Willers	Main		
Mpumi Mophatlane		Main	
Lebo JoJo Mokoena		Main	Main
Tarina Patel		Main	Friend
Lethabo LeJoy Mathatho		Main	Main
Mpho Merriweather		Main	
Mareli Bentley			Main
Keabetswe Marema			Main
Thobekile Mdlalose			Main
Nicole Lee Watson			Main
Mamus Koka			Main
Friends of the housewives
Lerika Kleinhans	Friend	Guest	
Olwethu Leshabane	Friend		
Nthabiseng "Chef Nti" Ramaboa	Friend		
Bridgette Sutter		Friend	

== Episodes ==
=== Series overview ===
Season	Episodes	Originally released	
Season	Episodes	First released	Last released
1	14	August 3, 2018	October 26, 2018
2	14	October 18, 2019	January 17, 2020
3	14	May 19, 2023	August 18, 2023

=== Season 1 (2018) ===
Christall Kay, Brittnette Seopela, Evodia Mogase, Mercy Mogase, Lendy Ter Mors, and Naledi Willers introduced as series regulars Lerika Kleinhans, Olwethu Leshabane and Nthabiseng "Chef" "Nti" Ramaboa severd in recurring capacities.

No. overall	No. in season	Title	Original release date
1	1	"Welcome to the Good Life"	3 August 2018
The six South African Jozi wives welcome people into their rich lives as first time African housewives Brinnette prepares for her traditional wedding as she struggles to invite her arch - enemy in the group Christall meanwhile mother and daughter Evodia and Mercy shock Brinnette when Mercy wants vegan food at an African wedding as at the traditional wedding Lendy gets very furious with Christall after an issue regarding outfits.
2	2	"The Real Private Jet"	10 August 2018
Naledi invites the girls to her hometown country Botswana for her mother's 50th birthday as Christall's lies about a private jet catch up with her as Evodia confronts her and when the ladies get to Botswana the class, lavishness and lifestyle they hoped and prepared for is completely the opposite as Christall feels misunderstood by the girls.
3	3	"Dinner from Hell"	17 August 2018
The girls come back from Botswana as Christall prepares to host the wives at her house as more housewives try to mingle with each other Naledi invites her friend Lerika to join the girls at Christall's tea party at her mansion when she insults Evodia and Mercy about the bugs and untidiness at their home earlier in the day when she was hosted causing a lot of racial controversy.
4	4	"Apology Gone Wrong"	24 August 2018
5	5	"Vegan Fever"	31 August 2018
6	6	"Fashion Show Disaster"	7 September 2018
7	7	"Still Water Run Deep"	14 September 2018
8	8	"The Bachelorette"	21 September 2018
9	9	"Shopping Spree Showdown"	28 September 2018
10	10	"Haarties"	5 October 2018
11	11	"The Big Day"	12 October 2018
12	12	"Season Finale"	19 October 2018
13	13	"Reunion - Part 1"	26 October 2018
14	14	"Reunion - Part 2"	26 October 2018

=== Season 2 (2019–2020) ===
Evodia, Mercy, Ter Mors and Willers departed as series regulars. Mpumi Mophatlane, Lebo JoJo Gunguluza, Tarina Patel, Lethabo Mathatho and Mpho Merriweather joined the cast. Bridgette Sutter served in a recurring capacity.

No. overall	No. in season	Title	Original release date
15	1	"Bye to be"	18 October 2019
Christall and Brinette prepare for their divorces as they are the only ones who returned from the first season as the four new girls Mpumi, Lebo, Lethabo and Tarina gives us a look to their glamorous lives.
16	2	"Friendships & Wives"	25 October 2019
Lethabo and Lebo try to navigate their friendship as the drama between Lebo's bestie might ruin their friendship and Lebo's birthday party as Mpumi considers acting.
17	3	"Cape Town Breakdown"	1 November 2019
The girls take a weekend away in Cape town as Christall becomes attached to Tarina and all fun ends when the girls confront Christall which leads to a mighty breakdown.
18	4	"No Sip, No Shade"	8 November 2019
Brinnette tries to get an understanding of Mpumi's mixed feelings towards her as Lebo looks to the last resort of her friendship with Lethabo and Lydia and Lethabo addresses her issue with Christall and Brinnette becomes turned off by Christall.
19	5	"Liar, Liar Pants on Fire"	15 November 2019
Tarina invites the girls to her sendoff party as Lebo prepares for her husband's big event and Lethabo and Christall's beef cool down as Christall shares her opinion on Brinnette's ex marriage and Mpumi and Lebo confront Tarina about not inviting them to her sendoff party.
20	6	"Miss Breezy's Thirsty"	22 November 2019
Lebo invites the girls to her 60s icon party as new girl Mpho joins the mix and while on a spa date Lethabo and Mpumi gossips about Brinnette's love life.
21	7	"Durban July, Here We Come Baby"	29 November 2019
The girls go to Durban for the durban July as Mpho finally get to meet the girls and at the actual Durban July event Brinnette and Lethabo have a heated altercation.
22	8	"Blonde's & Billionaires"	6 December 2019
The girls rehash Brinnette and Lethabo's heated argument as Christall plans her Blondes and Billionaires party and at the party Lethabo's love life becomes the topic as Lebo throughs shade.
23	9	"Champagne On Chrissy Baby"	13 December 2019
Sick Lethabo confronts Christall about her love life being centre topic at her party as at Mpho's 40th Mpho's friend Bridgette and Christall clash.
24	10	"Champagne Gate & Dirvorcettes"	20 December 2019
The champagne saga continues as Mpumi opens up her home to the girls and Christall becomes miss understood after the altercation with Bridgette and at the divorcette party Christall and Bridgette give each other the cold shoulder.
25	11	"Can It Be Squashed"	27 December 2019
Tarina invites the girls to her music video shooting as he Brinnette's birthday comes up the girls think of a way where they could squash the beef and Lethabo hosts the girls to her house but Lebo becomes furious with Mpumi.
26	12	"Limpopo Girls Trip & Reunion - Part 1"	3 January 2020
The girls go on a girls trip to Limpopo without Mpho as Lebo and Lethabo have a heated argument and the girls explore Limpopo with sick Lethabo and at the Reunion host Phat Joe tries to get to the bottom of the Brinnette rumours as Brinnette and Christall clash.
27	13	"Reunion - Part 2"	10 January 2020
Brinnette confronts Mpumi and Lethabo with the rumours as Mpumi claps back as Bridgette comes out to set the record straight which sets Christall on fire.
28	14	"Reunion - Part 3"	17 January 2020
Mpumi and Brinnette clash over cheating rumours as the reunion continues without Tarina and Lethabo discuss her issue with Brinnette and Lebo and Brinnette clash as the girls rehash on their trips and phat Joe's asks the girls about the season and who might return for season 3.

=== Season 3 (2023) ===
Kay, Seopela, Patel, Mophatlane, and Merriweather departed as series regulars. Keabetswe Marema, Thobekile Mdlalose, Nicole Watson, Mamus Koka, and Marelli Bentley joined the cast. Tarina Patel served in a recurring capacity.

No. overall	No. in season	Title	Original release date
29	1	"Episode 1"	19 May 2023
Nicole hosts a "Four Seasons" Flowetry get-together. All goes well until Nicole's friend, Leon, comes for everyone.
30	2	"Episode 2"	26 May 2023
All hell breaks loose when Lethabo takes photos in Mamus's shoes during a photo shoot. Later, Leon sticks his nose into other people's business yet again.
31	3	"Episode 3"	2 June 2023
There's a new troublemaker in town. Leon wants to set up an apology session between himself and Mamus. Lethabo arranges a "Bubbles, Burgers & Botox" event.
32	4	"Episode 4"	9 June 2023
Lebo takes the ladies to Zambia, where they are given the royal treatment. While the ladies enjoy Zambia, Leon is not happy and threatens to leave. There's a visit to a traditional healer.
33	5	"Episode 5"	16 June 2023
The ladies haven't fully unpacked when Lethabo must leave abruptly. Thobekile takes the ladies to the Zambezi River, where they experience and witness her ancestral calling for the first time.
34	6	"Episode 6"	23 June 2023
There's much catching up to do post the Zambia trip. Mamus, Leon and Success have their own session. Mamus invites her neighbor to Thobekile's skincare launch event.
35	7	"Episode 7"	30 June 2023
Mamus and Leon have come a long way since the cupcake incident. Now the frenemies are planning an event together. Mamus, Lebo and Mareli decide to take Nicole dress shopping.
36	8	"Episode 8"	7 July 2023
The sibling rivalry between Thobekile and Leon leaves them wondering if they could be related. Mareli decides to host a Halloween party that ends with the ghosts of Halloween showing up and shutting things down.
37	9	"Episode 9"	14 July 2023
At the Halloween party, Success tells Lethabo that the ladies were discussing her new body, with nothing positive to say. Trying to own up to his 'mess', Success invites Kea and Lethabo to a gym session.
38	10	"Episode 10"	21 July 2023
Kea is ready to launch her children's pajamas clothing line. She invites Leon for some last minute inspection. Lebo and Thobekile discuss the latest gossip while test-driving the latest Land Rover.
39	11	"Episode 11"	28 July 2023
40	12	"Episode 12"	4 August 2023
41	13	"Reunion Part 1"	11 August 2023
42	14	"Reunion Part 2"	18 August 2023

== Production ==
The Real Housewives of Johannesburg was first reported about in 2014. Another company took over production – repurposing some of the footage and reshooting with an added cast member to create the critically panned Divas of Jozi, which premiered on SABC3 in 2016.

In January 2018, as part of M-Net's ongoing rebrand of their Vuzu Amp channel to 1Magic – it was announced that they had secured an official version of The Real Housewives franchise, to premiere within the year.

In July 2018, the season one cast was announced. The first season premiered on August 3, 2018, with Christall Kay, mother and daughter Evodia and Mercy Mogase, Brinnette Seopela, Naledi Willers, and Busisiwe 'Lendy' Ter Mors joining the cast. That November, the series was renewed for a second season. In May 2019, Evodia and Mercy Mogase, announced their departure from the show.

On September 18, 2019, the cast of the second season was announced. The second season premiered on October 18, 2019, with Lebo JoJo Mokoena, Lethabo Mathatho, Mpho Merriweather, Mpumi Mophatlane and Tarina Patel joining Kay and Seopela.

In April 2021, it was revealed that production for the third season had been halted due to a physical altercation between Kay and Seopela. On December 7 of the same year, Willers died at the age of 30 following a battle with breast cancer.

In November 2022, it was announced the series would return in the following year. The third season premiered on May 19, 2023, with Mokoena and Mathatho reprising their roles, alongside new additions Mamus Koka, Keabetswe Marema, Thobekile Mdlalose, Nicole Watson, and Marelli Bentley. In May 2024, the series was put on a hiatus ahead of the fourth season.

== Broadcast ==
In South Africa, the first season began airing episodes on 1Magic on 3 August 2018. The second season premiered on 18 October 2019.

The show also airs on Media24's Honey on 10 May 2021.

=== International broadcast ===
In Australia, the series premiered on Arena, on subscription service Foxtel, on 7 July 2019.

In Canada, the series airs on cable channel Slice.

On January 19, 2022, the first two seasons became available in the United States for the first time on Discovery+ with a subscription. It had also been available to Tubi on April 1, 2022, but is no longer available on neither since May 2023.

In Africa as a whole, the show can be streamed on Showmax. While in Europe and multiple other Countries across the globe, the show can be streamed on Hayu.
