= The Real Housewives of Durban =

South African reality television series

- Genre: Reality Television
- Based on: The Real Housewives
- Presented by: Phat Joe; Donovan Goliath; MaBlerh
- Starring: Sorisha Naidoo; Nonkululeko Williams; Annie Ludick; Ayanda Ncwane; Nonkanyiso Conco; Kgomotso Ndungane; JoJo Robinson; Londiwe Zulu; Thobile Mseleku; Slindile Wendy Ndlovu; Maria Valaskatzis; Mbali Ngiba; Angel Nqobile Ndlela; Zama Ngcobo; Ameigh Sibahle Thompson; Kwanele Kubheka; Ayanda Mthembu; Lorraine Sithole
- Country of origin: South Africa
- Original languages: English; Zulu; Tswana
- No. of seasons: 5
- No. of episodes: 56

Production
- Production locations: Durban, KwaZulu-Natal, South Africa
- Camera setup: Multiple
- Running time: ~45 minutes
- Production company: Let It Rain Films

Original release
- Network: Showmax
- Release: 29 January 2021 – present

Related
- The Real Housewives of Johannesburg; The Real Housewives of Lagos

The Real Housewives of Durban, abbreviated RHODurban, is a South African reality television series that premiered on 29 January 2021, on Showmax.

The show is developed as the 24th international installment of the American The Real Housewives franchise and the second installment of the franchise set in South Africa. The Real Housewives of Durban focuses on the personal and professional lives of several women living in Durban, South Africa.

The series originally focused on Sorisha Naidoo, Nonkululeko Williams, Annie Ludick, Nonkanyiso Conco, Ayanda Ncwane and Kgomotso Ndungane; the lineup currently consists of Naidoo, Williams, Robinson, Ndlela, Kubheka, Mthembu and Sithole. Of the original housewives, Ncwane and Kgomotso left after the first season, whilst Conco departed after the second and Ludick after the third. The remaining housewives joined in later seasons: Robinson in the second, Ndlela in the fourth, Kubheka, Mthembu and Sithole in the fifth. Other housewives include Londiwe Zulu (seasons 2), Thobile Mseleku (season 2), Maria Valaskatzis (season 3-4), Slindile Ndlovu (season 3-4), Mbali Ngiba (season 3), Zama Ngcobo (season 4) Ameigh Sibahle Thompson (season 4).

== Overview and casting ==
The cast of the upcoming fifth season consists of Sorisha Naidoo, Nonkululeko "Nonku" Williiams, Jo - Anne "JoJo" Robinson, Nqobile “Angel” Ndlela, Kwanele Kubheka, Ayanda Mthembu, and Lo Sithole. Previously-featured cast members include original housewives Kgomotso Ndungane, Ayanda Ncwane, Nonkanyiso Conco, and Annie Mthembu; and subsequent housewives Londiwe Zulu, Thobile Khumalo Mseleku, Mbaliyesizwe Ngiba, Slindile Wendy "Slee" Ndlovu, Maria Valaskatzis, Zamaswazi "Zama" Ngcobo, and Ameigh Sibahle Thompson.

Main cast members
Cast member	Seasons					
Cast member	1	2	3	4	5	6
Sorisha Naidoo	Main	Main	Main	Main	Main	Main
Nonkululeko "Nonku" Williams	Main	Main	Main	Main	Main	
Nonkanyiso "LaConco" Conco	Main	Main				
Anne-Toni "Annie" Mthembu	Main	Main	Main	Guest		
Ayanda Ncwane	Main					
Kgomotso Ndungane	Main	Guest				
Londiwe "Londie London" Zulu		Main	Guest		Friend	Main
Jo-Anne "JoJo" Robinson		Main	Main	Main	Main	Main
Thobile Khumalo Mseleku		Main			Guest	Friend
Maria Valaskatzis			Main	Main		
Slindile Wendy "Slee" Ndlovu			Main	Main		
Mbaliyesizwe "Mbali" Ngiba			Main			
Zamaswazi "Zama" Ngcobo				Main		
Nqobile Angel Ndlela				Main	Main	Main
Ameigh Sibahle Thompson				Main		
Kwanele "Fafa" Kubheka					Main	Main
Ayanda Mthembu					Main	
Lorraine "Lo" Sithole					Main	
TBA						Main
TBA						Main
Friends of the housewives
Thobekile Ndlovu	Friend					
Busisiwe "Mabusi" Seme	Friend	Friend		Guest		
Sanelisiwe "Sane" Bhengu			Friend			
Minenhle "Minnie" Ntuli					Friend	
Andile Pieterson					Friend	
Precious Udoye					Friend	

== Episodes ==
Season	Episodes	Originally released	
Season	Episodes	First released	Last released
1	14	January 29, 2021	April 30, 2021
2	14	January 28, 2022	May 13, 2022
3	14	February 1, 2023	May 17, 2023
4	14	February 9, 2024	May 22, 2024
5	14	March 28, 2025	July 11, 2025

=== Season 1 (2021) ===
Sorisha Naidoo, Nonku Williams, Annie Ludick, Ayanda Ncwane, Laconco Conco, and Kgomotso Ndungane introduced as series regulars. Thobekile Ndlovu and Busisiwe "Mabusi" Seme served in recurring capacities.

No. overall	No. in series	Title	Original release date	Viewers (millions)
1	1	"Can the Real Housewives of Durban Please Stand Up?"	29 January 2021	N/A
2	2	"Baby Momma"	5 February 2021	N/A
3	3	"For the Sake of the Children"	12 February 2021	N/A
4	4	"Google Me, Baby"	19 February 2021	N/A
5	5	"Kulungile Baba"	26 February 2021	N/A
6	6	"The Low Down"	5 March 2021	N/A
7	7	"Backhander"	12 March 2021	N/A
8	8	"Smoke & Mirrors"	19 March 2021	N/A
9	9	"Purposefully"	26 March 2021	N/A
10	10	"Uninvited"	2 April 2021	N/A
11	11	"The Streets"	9 April 2021	N/A
12	12	"Say It To Her Face"	16 April 2021	N/A
13	13	"Reunion Part One"	30 April 2021	N/A
14	14	"Reunion Part Two"	30 April 2021	N/A

=== Season 2 (2022) ===
Ayanda Ncwane and Kgomotso Ndungane departed as series regulars. Londie London, JoJo Robinson and Thobile Mseleku joined the cast. Busisiwe "Mabusi" Seme served in a recurring capacity.

No. overall	No. in series	Title	Original release date	Viewers (millions)
15	1	"New Faces, Old Secrets"	28 January 2022	N/A
16	2	"The Icing on the Cake"	4 February 2022	N/A
17	3	"It's a Black Tie Affair"	11 February 2022	N/A
18	4	"A New Friend in Town"	18 February 2022	N/A
19	5	"Sexy Scary"	25 February 2022	N/A
20	6	"Time for an Intervention"	4 March 2022	N/A
21	7	"The Long Journey"	11 March 2022	N/A
22	8	"Confession on the Table"	18 March 2022	N/A
23	9	"The Aftermath"	25 March 2022	N/A
24	10	"A Tale of Virgins"	1 April 2022	N/A
25	11	"Betrayal at the Palace"	8 April 2022	N/A
26	12	"Friends to Foes"	15 April 2022	N/A
27	13	"Reunion Part One"	6 May 2022	N/A
28	14	"Reunion Part Two"	13 May 2022	N/A

=== Season 3 (2023) ===
LaConco Conco, Londie London and Thobile Mseleku departed as series regulars. Maria Valaskatzis, Slee Ndlovu and Mbali Ngiba joined the cast. Sanelisiwe "Sane" Bhengu served in a recurring capacity.

No. overall	No. in series	Title	Original release date	Viewers (millions)
29	1	"Meet My Friend"	1 February 2023	N/A
30	2	"Leave My Husband"	8 February 2023	N/A
31	3	"Romantic/Goodbye"	15 February 2023	N/A
32	4	"Answer For Your Actions!"	22 February 2023	N/A
33	5	"Boo Bitch"	1 March 2023	N/A
34	6	"I Am Sorry"	8 March 2023	N/A
35	7	"Let's Pray"	15 March 2023	N/A
36	8	"A Bad Weed"	22 March 2023	N/A
37	9	"Let's Get In The Ring"	29 March 2023	N/A
38	10	"Giving Back"	5 April 2023	N/A
39	11	"Hit, Run & Cry"	12 April 2023	N/A
40	12	"Let's Go Back Home"	19 April 2023	N/A
41	13	"Reunion Part One"	10 May 2023	N/A
42	14	"Reunion Part Two"	17 May 2023	N/A

=== Season 4 (2024) ===
Annie Ludick and Mbali Ngiba departed as series regulars. Zama Ngcobo, Angel Ndlela and Ameigh Sibahle joined the cast.

No. overall	No. in series	Title	Original release date	Viewers (millions)
43	1	"The Housewives have Spoken"	9 February 2024	N/A
44	2	"You're looking for a moment"	14 February 2024	N/A
45	3	"It's a Peacock"	21 February 2024	N/A
46	4	"The Hoe Down"	28 February 2024	N/A
47	5	"Glow Up"	6 March 2024	N/A
48	6	"In Fertility"	13 March 2024	N/A
49	7	"Drakensberg again???"	20 March 2024	N/A
50	8	"No Angel"	27 March 2024	N/A
51	9	"The Great Divide"	3 April 2024	N/A
52	10	"Fashion No Show"	10 April 2024	N/A
53	11	"Away We Go Again"	17 April 2024	N/A
54	12	"Desert Dinner"	24 April 2024	N/A
55	13	"Reunion Part One"	15 May 2024	N/A
56	14	"Reunion Part Two"	22 May 2024	N/A

=== Season 5 (2025) ===
Maria Valaskatzis, Slee Ndlovu, Zama Ngcobo, and Ameigh Sibahle departed as series regulars. Kwanele Kubheka, Ayanda Mthembu, and Lo Sithole joined the cast. Londie London, Minenhle "Minnie" Ntuli, Andile Pieterson, and Precious Udoye served in recurring capacities.
