= List of The Real Housewives of Miami episodes =

The Real Housewives of Miami is an American reality television series that premiered on Bravo on February 22, 2011. After an eight-year hiatus, the series was brought back by streaming service Peacock with a premiere of December 2021. The series' seventh season chronicles the lives of six women in and around several communities in Miami— Alexia Nepola, Larsa Pippen, Lisa Hochstein, Guerdy Abraira, Julia Lemigova and Stephanie Shojaee —as they balance their personal and business lives, along with their social circle.

Former cast members featured over the previous seasons are: Lea Black (1–3), Adriana de Moura (1–3), Marysol Patton (1–2), Cristy Rice (1), Joanna Krupa (2–3), Ana Quincoces (2), Karent Sierra (2) and Dr. Nicole Martin (4–6).

As of October 16, 2025, a total of 114 original episodes of The Real Housewives of Miami have aired.

== Series overview ==
The Real Housewives of Miami episodes
Season	Episodes	Originally released			Average Viewers
Season	Episodes	First released	Last released	Network	Average Viewers
1	7	February 22, 2011	April 5, 2011	Bravo	1.09
2	18	September 13, 2012	January 8, 2013	Bravo	1.07
3	16	August 12, 2013	November 14, 2013	Bravo	1.02
4	14	December 16, 2021	March 10, 2022	Peacock	0.28
5	19	December 8, 2022	March 23, 2023	Peacock	0.25
6	20	November 1, 2023	March 7, 2024	Bravo	0.42
7	20	June 11, 2025	October 16, 2025	Bravo	0.29

== Episodes ==
=== Season 1 (2011) ===
Lea Black, Adriana de Moura, Alexia Nepola, Marysol Patton, Larsa Pippen and Cristy Rice are introduced as series regulars.

The Real Housewives of Miami season 1 episodes
No. overall	No. in season	Title	Original release date	U.S. viewers (millions)
1	1	"Paradise Cost"	February 22, 2011	1.21
2	2	"Black Ball'd"	March 1, 2011	1.03
3	3	"Optical Delusion"	March 8, 2011	1.30
4	4	"Waterfront and Center"	March 15, 2011	1.10
5	5	"Beach Slap"	March 22, 2011	1.19
6	6	"Miami Mamis Know Best"	March 29, 2011	1.09
7	7	"Watch What Happens Live: Miami Housewives Reunion"	April 5, 2011	0.72

=== Season 2 (2012–2013) ===
Alexia Nepola, Larsa Pippen and Cristy Rice departed as series regulars; Nepola continued to appear in a recurring capacity. Lisa Hochstein, Joanna Krupa, Ana Quincoces and Karent Sierra joined the cast.

The Real Housewives of Miami season 2 episodes
No. overall	No. in season	Title	Original release date	U.S. viewers (millions)
8	1	"A Tale of Two Miamis"	September 13, 2012	1.06
9	2	"Text, Lies and Your Smile Is Fake"	September 20, 2012	1.02
10	3	"A Mynt Meltdown"	September 27, 2012	0.96
11	4	"She Beat Me to the Tweet!"	October 4, 2012	0.84
12	5	"Eager Beaver"	October 11, 2012	0.87
13	6	"Sexting Candles"	October 18, 2012	0.76
14	7	"Bras and Brawls: Part 1"	October 25, 2012	0.85
15	8	"Bras and Brawls: Part 2"	October 28, 2012	1.35
16	9	"Conflicting Conflict"	November 1, 2012	1.09
17	10	"A Better or Bitter Place"	November 11, 2012	1.63
18	11	"Uncomfortably Public Relations"	November 15, 2012	1.13
19	12	"Parents Fly South"	November 29, 2012	1.02
20	13	"Elsa Foretells a Storm"	December 6, 2012	0.95
21	14	"Surrounded by Hot Water"	December 13, 2012	1.12
22	15	"Healing Hole"	December 20, 2012	1.25
23	16	"Reunion: Part 1"	December 27, 2012	1.21
24	17	"Reunion: Part 2"	January 3, 2013	1.28
25	18	"Lost Footage"	January 8, 2013	0.93

=== Season 3 (2013) ===
Marysol Patton, Ana Quincoces and Karent Sierra departed as series regulars; Patton and Quincoces continued to appear in recurring capacities. Alexia Nepola rejoined the cast as a series regular.

The Real Housewives of Miami season 3 episodes
No. overall	No. in season	Title	Original release date	U.S. viewers (millions)
26	1	"Til Lies Do Us Part"	August 12, 2013	1.35
27	2	"Hurricane Adriana"	August 19, 2013	1.39
28	3	"Booby-Trapped"	August 26, 2013	1.32
29	4	"Black Magic"	September 2, 2013	1.01
30	5	"A Cause for Concern"	September 9, 2013	1.01
31	6	"A Ple-Thora of Lies"	September 16, 2013	1.06
32	7	"La La Land"	September 23, 2013	0.81
33	8	"Mama Elsa Comes Home"	September 30, 2013	0.65
34	9	"Birkin Buddies"	October 7, 2013	0.80
35	10	"Brazilian Bridezilla"	October 14, 2013	0.86
36	11	"The Black Sheep"	October 21, 2013	0.83
37	12	"Bridesmaid Breakdown"	October 28, 2013	0.76
38	13	"Blame It on the Alcohol"	November 3, 2013	1.37
39	14	"Mrs. Zago"	November 4, 2013	0.95
40	15	"Reunion – Part 1"	November 11, 2013	1.07
41	16	"Reunion – Part 2"	November 14, 2013	1.00

=== Season 4 (2021–2022) ===
Lea Black, Adriana de Moura and Joanna Krupa departed as series regulars; de Moura continued to appear in a recurring capacity. Larsa Pippen rejoined the cast as a series regular. Guerdy Abraira, Julia Lemigova and Nicole Martin joined the cast. Marysol Patton and Kiki Barth also served in recurring capacities.

The Real Housewives of Miami season 4 episodes
No. overall	No. in season	Title	Original release date	U.S. viewers (millions)
42	1	"¡Bienvenidos! Same Beaches, New Shade"	December 16, 2021	0.37
43	2	"Sushi Rolls and Wedding Woes"	December 16, 2021	0.31
44	3	"Painted With Pride"	December 23, 2021	0.34
45	4	"It’s Your Party and I’ll Cry if I Want To"	December 30, 2021	0.32
46	5	"Family Therapy"	January 6, 2022	0.24
47	6	"Flirting at the Faena"	January 13, 2022	0.24
48	7	"Bling, Boobs and Bickering"	January 20, 2022	0.25
49	8	"Le Fin?"	January 27, 2022	0.24
50	9	"Hamptons Hangover"	February 3, 2022	0.29
51	10	"Looking for Trouble"	February 10, 2022	0.27
52	11	"Versace and Venom"	February 17, 2022	0.25
53	12	"No Wedding and a Funeral"	February 24, 2022	0.34
54	13	"Reunion Part 1"	March 3, 2022	0.20
55	14	"Reunion Part 2"	March 10, 2022	0.30

=== Season 5 (2022–2023) ===
Marysol Patton, Adriana de Moura and Kiki Barth served in recurring capacities.

The Real Housewives of Miami season 5 episodes
No. overall	No. in season	Title	Original release date	U.S. viewers (millions)
56	1	"Not So New Beginnings"	December 8, 2022	0.266
57	2	"Rock the Boat"	December 8, 2022	0.249
58	3	"Date Night Disaster"	December 8, 2022	0.221
59	4	"Hot Mic in Miami"	December 8, 2022	0.282
60	5	"Destination: Divorce"	December 15, 2022	0.299
61	6	"Dumped and Dumbfounded"	December 22, 2022	0.290
62	7	"Stars and Cigars"	December 29, 2022	0.212
63	8	"Sing & Shout"	January 5, 2023	0.268
64	9	"Hot off the Press"	January 12, 2023	0.285
65	10	"Diamond Rings and Rumours"	January 19, 2023	0.288
66	11	"Black Card Energy"	January 26, 2023	0.252
67	12	"Apology Not Accepted"	February 2, 2023	0.298
68	13	"Brujerìa in The Bahamas"	February 9, 2023	0.268
69	14	"Rage, Release, Repeat"	February 16, 2023	0.221
70	15	"Lines in the Sand"	February 23, 2023	N/A
71	16	"Melting Pot Meltdown"	March 2, 2023	N/A
72	17	"Reunion Part 1"	March 9, 2023	N/A
73	18	"Reunion Part 2"	March 16, 2023	N/A
74	19	"Reunion Part 3"	March 23, 2023	N/A

=== Season 6 (2023–2024) ===
Marysol Patton, Adriana de Moura and Kiki Barth served in recurring capacities.

The Real Housewives of Miami season 6 episodes
No. overall	No. in season	Title	Original release date	U.S. viewers (millions)
75	1	"Nuevos Horizontes"	November 1, 2023	0.38
76	2	"Champagne Confessions"	November 8, 2023	0.43
77	3	"Loose Lips"	November 15, 2023	0.46
78	4	"Slam Dunks and Friendship Flunks"	November 22, 2023	0.31
79	5	"A Night at the Opera"	November 29, 2023	0.41
80	6	"Farmer of the Opera"	December 6, 2023	0.42
81	7	"Dildo & Dildon't"	December 13, 2023	0.44
82	8	"Palm Beach Pandemonium"	December 20, 2023	0.35
83	9	"Mamacita Madness Part 1"	December 27, 2023	0.34
84	10	"Mamacita Madness Part 2"	January 3, 2024	0.52
85	11	"Invite Only"	January 10, 2024	0.46
86	12	"Sink or Swim"	January 17, 2024	0.49
87	13	"Miami in Mexico"	January 24, 2024	0.50
88	14	"Row, Row, Row Me Off This Boat"	January 31, 2024	0.44
89	15	"Get Me Off This Gondola!"	February 7, 2024	0.46
90	16	"Adios Mexico!"	February 14, 2024	0.40
91	17	"Havana Nights"	February 21, 2024	0.47
92	18	"Reunion Part 1"	February 28, 2024	0.47
93	19	"Reunion Part 2"	February 29, 2024	0.31
94	20	"Reunion Part 3"	March 7, 2024	0.33

=== Season 7 (2025) ===
Nicole Martin departed as a series regular. Stephanie Shojaee joined the cast. Marysol Patton, Adriana de Moura and Kiki Barth served in recurring capacities.

The Real Housewives of Miami season 7 episodes
No. overall	No. in season	Title	Original release date	U.S. viewers (millions)
95	1	"MIA Back in Action"	June 11, 2025	0.29
96	2	"Miami Takes Milan"	June 18, 2025	0.31
97	3	"Worst Wedding Ever"	June 25, 2025	0.28
98	4	"Boogers and Birkins"	July 2, 2025	0.28
99	5	"Miami Goddesses"	July 9, 2025	0.29
100	6	"Major Red Flags"	July 16, 2025	0.28
101	7	"Textual Tension"	July 23, 2025	0.28
102	8	"Dueling Yachts"	July 30, 2025	0.27
103	9	"Preppy, Petty People"	August 6, 2025	0.26
104	10	"The Thrill of Seville"	August 13, 2025	0.29
105	11	"Unfollow or Unfriend"	August 14, 2025	0.27
106	12	"Uncivil in Seville"	August 21, 2025	0.32
107	13	"Next Stop, Marbella"	August 28, 2025	0.30
108	14	"Navigating Friend Ships"	September 4, 2025	0.30
109	15	"Birthday Blues Cruise"	September 11, 2025	0.29
110	16	"The Art of Arguing"	September 18, 2025	0.27
111	17	"Frosty Friendships"	September 25, 2025	0.26
112	18	"Reunion Part 1"	October 2, 2025	0.31
113	19	"Reunion Part 2"	October 9, 2025	0.31
114	20	"Reunion Part 3"	October 16, 2025	0.29
