= The Real Housewives of Miami season 6 =

Season of television series

The Real Housewives of Miami
- Season 6
- Promotional poster via Peacock
- Starring: Alexia Nepola; Larsa Pippen; Lisa Hochstein; Guerdy Abraira; Julia Lemigova; Nicole Martin
- No. of episodes: 20

Release
- Original network: Bravo
- Original release: November 1, 2023 – March 7, 2024

Season chronology
- ← Previous; Season 5 Next → Season 7

The sixth season of The Real Housewives of Miami, an American reality television series, is broadcast on Bravo. It premiered on November 1, 2023. The season was primarily filmed in Miami, Florida. Its executive producers are Matt Anderson, Nate Green, Cooper Green, Maty Buss, Bill Fritz, James Brangert and Andy Cohen.

The season focuses on the lives of Alexia Nepola, Larsa Pippen, Lisa Hochstein, Guerdy Abraira, Julia Lemigova, and Nicole Martin. Adriana de Moura, Marysol Patton and Kiki Barth are also featured in a recurring capacity.

This was the first season since the third season, where episodes premiered on Bravo. However, episodes would still be streamed on Peacock the next day.

This season marked the final regular appearance of Nicole Martin.

== Cast ==
For the sixth season, all cast members from the fourth and fifth season returned, making it the first time in the show's history where the cast was unchanged for three consecutive seasons. In addition, former housewife Ana Quincoces made guest appearances throughout the season.

== Episodes ==
The Real Housewives of Miami season 6 episodes
No. overall	No. in season	Title	Original release date	U.S. viewers (millions)
75	1	"Nuevos Horizontes"	November 1, 2023	0.38
76	2	"Champagne Confessions"	November 8, 2023	0.43
77	3	"Loose Lips"	November 15, 2023	0.46
78	4	"Slam Dunks and Friendship Flunks"	November 22, 2023	0.31
79	5	"A Night at the Opera"	November 29, 2023	0.41
80	6	"Farmer of the Opera"	December 6, 2023	0.42
81	7	"Dildo & Dildon't"	December 13, 2023	0.44
82	8	"Palm Beach Pandemonium"	December 20, 2023	0.35
83	9	"Mamacita Madness Part 1"	December 27, 2023	0.34
84	10	"Mamacita Madness Part 2"	January 3, 2024	0.52
85	11	"Invite Only"	January 10, 2024	0.46
86	12	"Sink or Swim"	January 17, 2024	0.49
87	13	"Miami in Mexico"	January 24, 2024	0.50
88	14	"Row, Row, Row Me Off This Boat"	January 31, 2024	0.44
89	15	"Get Me Off This Gondola!"	February 7, 2024	0.46
90	16	"Adios Mexico!"	February 14, 2024	0.40
91	17	"Havana Nights"	February 21, 2024	0.47
92	18	"Reunion Part 1"	February 28, 2024	0.47
93	19	"Reunion Part 2"	February 29, 2024	0.31
94	20	"Reunion Part 3"	March 7, 2024	0.33

== External References ==
- Official website
- The Real Housewives of Miami at IMDb
