= The Real Housewives of Miami season 5 =

Season of television series

The Real Housewives of Miami
- Season 5
- Cover used by Peacock
- Starring: Alexia Nepola; Larsa Pippen; Lisa Hochstein; Guerdy Abraira; Julia Lemigova; Nicole Martin
- No. of episodes: 19

Release
- Original network: Peacock
- Original release: December 8, 2022 – March 23, 2023

Season chronology
- ← Previous; Season 4 Next → Season 6

The fifth season of The Real Housewives of Miami, an American reality television series, premiered on Peacock on December 8, 2022. The season was primarily filmed in Miami, Florida. Its executive producers are Matt Anderson, Nate Green, Cooper Green and Andy Cohen.

The season focuses on the lives of Guerdy Abraira, Alexia Nepola, Lisa Hochstein, Julia Lemigova, Nicole Martin and Larsa Pippen. Adriana De Moura, Marysol Patton and Kiki Barth are also featured in a recurring capacity.

This was the final season to release new episodes on Peacock before airing on Bravo months after, as Bravo announced in May 2023 that the series would return to the network for the show's sixth season, with episodes streaming on Peacock the next day.

== Cast ==
For the fifth season, all cast members from the conclusion of the fourth season returned, making it the first time in the show's history the cast was unchanged between seasons. In addition, former housewife Lea Black made a guest appearance during the season.

== Episodes ==
The Real Housewives of Miami season 5 episodes
No. overall	No. in season	Title	Original release date	U.S. viewers (millions)
56	1	"Not So New Beginnings"	December 8, 2022	0.266
A grudge between Guerdy and Alexia taints her long awaited wedding celebration. Larsa hosts a “new beginnings” party, but falls into old habits when she discovers a joke made at her expense. On Star Island, trouble bubbles in Lisa’s marriage.
57	2	"Rock the Boat"	December 8, 2022	0.249
Julia struggles with empty nesting in her marriage. Nicole’s mom gives her some tough love. After a year of tragedy, Alexia finally celebrates her nuptials with her family and friends on a luxe yacht, but Lisa and Larsa rock the boat.
58	3	"Date Night Disaster"	December 8, 2022	0.221
Alexia struggles with her son’s life decisions. Julia decides to restart her modelling career. Nicole hosts a beach day where Alexia questions if Adriana’s wedding date is married. Lisa’s romantic night with Lenny turns out to be anything but perfect.
59	4	"Hot Mic in Miami"	December 8, 2022	0.282
Larsa hosts a paw-ty for her dog’s birthday. Nicole receives upsetting and possibly threatening news from her father. Julia worries that Martina may leave her. Lisa hosts a pool party for the ladies where Lenny’s true intentions are revealed.
60	5	"Destination: Divorce"	December 15, 2022	0.299
Tensions rise between Julia and Martina during a family dinner with their daughter. Nicole takes the girls out on her private boat for the day. As the ladies head to Key West, they wonder what’s wrong with Lisa.
61	6	"Dumped and Dumbfounded"	December 22, 2022	0.290
In Key West, Lisa goes into detail about Lenny leaving her for a younger woman. While celebrating her birthday, Alexia insults Julia and her birthplace. Lisa panics is that Lenny is bringing his girlfriend into her home with her children there.
62	7	"Stars and Cigars"	December 29, 2022	0.212
Guerdy reaches a boiling point with the group; on the final night of the trip. Adriana tries to get to the bottom of her date’s marital status. Lisa and Larsa confront Lenny and his girlfriend at the Formula 1 event.
63	8	"Sing & Shout"	January 5, 2023	0.268
Adriana films a music video for her new single, “Fyah,” on a yacht. Alexia and Guerdy rock the boat when they come to final blows. Julia hosts a housewarming party. Larsa confronts Julia about kissing a man.
64	9	"Hot off the Press"	January 12, 2023	0.285
65	10	"Diamond Rings and Rumours"	January 19, 2023	0.288
66	11	"Black Card Energy"	January 26, 2023	0.252
67	12	"Apology Not Accepted"	February 2, 2023	0.298
68	13	"Brujerìa in The Bahamas"	February 9, 2023	0.268
69	14	"Rage, Release, Repeat"	February 16, 2023	0.221
70	15	"Lines in the Sand"	February 23, 2023	N/A
71	16	"Melting Pot Meltdown"	March 2, 2023	N/A
72	17	"Reunion Part 1"	March 9, 2023	N/A
73	18	"Reunion Part 2"	March 16, 2023	N/A
74	19	"Reunion Part 3"	March 23, 2023	N/A
