= Larsa Pippen =

American television personality (born 1974)

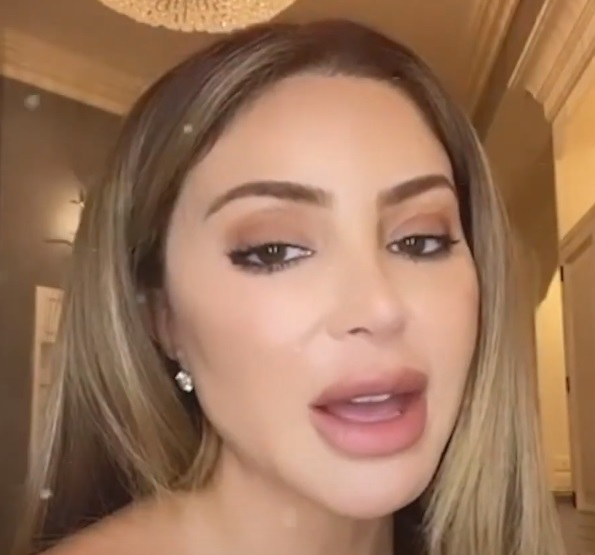
- Born: Larsa Marie Younan; July 6, 1974 (age 52); Chicago, Illinois, U.S.
- Education: University of Illinois, Chicago (BA)
- Occupations: Television personality; businesswoman
- Years active: 2011–present
- Known for: The Real Housewives of Miami; Keeping Up with the Kardashians; The Traitors; House of Villains
- Spouse: Scottie Pippen (m. 1997; div. 2021)
- Children: 4, including Scotty Jr. & Justin
- Website: larsamarie.com

Larsa Marie Pippen (née Younan; born July 6, 1974) is an American reality television personality. She is an original cast member of the Bravo reality television series The Real Housewives of Miami, starring in five of its seven seasons since premiering in 2011. She is the ex-wife of former NBA player Scottie Pippen.

== Career ==
=== Television ===
In February 2011, The Real Housewives of Miami debuted its first season, featuring Pippen alongside Lea Black, Adriana de Moura, Alexia Nepola, Marysol Patton and Cristy Rice as they balanced their personal and professional lives, following a "work hard, play hard" lifestyle, while living in Miami, Florida. Pippen departed the first season after only 7 episodes, reportedly due to her being "too level-headed" for the Miami housewives cast. The show ended after its third season due to the declining ratings leading up to the reunion. After Bravo re-ran the first 3 seasons of the show in 2020, rumours circulated in November 2020 of a potential fourth season. In 2021, a fourth season was confirmed by Bravo in February, with a cast announcement made by streaming service Peacock in October, featuring Pippen alongside Lisa Hochstein and Nepola, with newcomers Guerdy Abraira, Julia Lemigova and Nicole Martin; joined by de Moura, Patton and new friend Kiki Barth. Pippen returned for the show's fifth season, which premiered in December 2022, the show's sixth season and seventh season, which premiered in November 2023 and June 2025 on Bravo.

In addition to Pippen's housewives return, she has made frequent appearances on Keeping Up with the Kardashians over the years, notably due to her friendship with Kim Kardashian and the rest of the Kardashian-Jenner family. She appeared on the second season's fifth episode of Selling Sunset where Chrishell Stause gave her a house tour. She was also present alongside her then-husband, Scottie Pippen, as they supported their daughter Sophia on Dancing with the Stars: Juniors. Pippen has made guest appearances on talk shows, including The Nick Cannon TV Series, The Wendy Williams Show, Watch What Happens Live with Andy Cohen and Tamron Hall.

In September 2023, it was announced that Pippen would be a contestant on Peacock's second season of The Traitors. The season was released in January 2024. Later the same year, Pippen competed on season 2 of House of Villains.

=== Jewelry ===
In August 2020, Pippen launched and modeled her high-end jewelry line, Larsa Marie. She detailed that the line offers a wide variety of pieces that focus on "self-love and empowering women to feel like their best selves". In 2021, Pippen scored the cover of Harper's Bazaar Vietnam's August issue, as she debuted her latest collection, discussed her personal life in the public eye and provided fashion advice.

== Personal life ==
Pippen's parents are ethnically Assyrian; her mother is from Lebanon and her father from Syria. She is a mother to Scotty Jr., Preston, Justin and Sophia, all of whom she shares with her ex-husband Scottie Pippen. Scottie and Larsa first split in 2016 after almost two decades of marriage but reconciled. They began their separation process again in 2018. Their divorce was finalized on December 15, 2021, with all issues resolved amicably, and both continuing to focus on "co-parenting their remaining minor children". From November 2020 to April 2021, Larsa briefly dated former NBA player Malik Beasley.

In 2022, she began a widely-publicized relationship with Marcus Jordan, the son of Scottie Pippen's ex-teammate Michael Jordan. Larsa Pippen and Marcus Jordan dated for approximately a year and a half before ending the relationship in early 2024. In April 2025, she began dating former professional basketball player and Columbia graduate Jeff Coby. The couple broke up in April 2026.

== Filmography ==
Year	Title	Notes
2011, 2021–present	The Real Housewives of Miami	Main cast; seasons 1, 4–present
2011, 2022	Watch What Happens Live!	Guest; seasons 4 and 18–19
2011, 2014–15, 2017–19	Keeping Up with the Kardashians	Guest; seasons 6, 9–10, and 14–16
2018	Dancing with the Stars: Juniors	Guest; season 1
2020	Selling Sunset	Guest; season 2
2021	The Nick Cannon TV Series	Guest
2022	The Wendy Williams Show	Guest
2023	Tamron Hall	Guest
2023	The Real Housewives of Beverly Hills	Guest; S13 EP5: "Sutton-ly Suspicious"
2024	The Traitors	Contestant - Faithful; Season 2
2024	House of Villains	Contestant; Season 2
2026	The Real Housewives Ultimate Girls Trip	Guest; Season 5, Episode 7

== See also ==
- The Real Housewives
- The Real Housewives of Miami
