= Havana Elsa =

Web series

- Genre: Reality television
- Starring: Elsa Patton
- Country of origin: United States
- Original language: English
- No. of seasons: 1
- No. of episodes: 9

Production
- Executive producers: Matt Anderson; Nate Green; Maty Buss
- Production company: Purveyors of Pop

Original release
- Network: Bravo
- Release: September 17, 2012

Related
- The Real Housewives of Miami

Havana Elsa is an American reality television web series that was released on September 17, 2012, on Bravotv.com, the official website for Bravo. A spin-off to The Real Housewives of Miami, the series featured Elsa Patton, also known as Mama Elsa, the mother of then full-time cast member of The Real Housewives of Miami Marysol Patton, embarking on launching her own coffee line, also titled Havana Elsa.

== Development ==
Bravo released the web series titled Havana Elsa on September 17, 2012, while season 2 of The Real Housewives of Miami was airing. The series starred Elsa Patton, known as Mama Elsa, the mother of full-time cast member of The Real Housewives of Miami Marysol Patton. The series depicted Patton launching her own coffee line, also titled Havana Elsa. The series consists of 9 episodes. After the conclusion of the second season of The Real Housewives of Miami, Patton's health had deteriorated when she suffered a brain injury after a fall in her home. Despite her health issues, Patton continued to appear on the third season of The Real Housewives of Miami. Patton died on May 12, 2019, aged 84; she was predeceased by her husband of 50 years, Donald Patton, who died in February 2018.

== Episodes ==
No.	Title	Original release date
1	"From Mama to Coffee Maven"	September 17, 2012
Elsa begins the journey of developing her very own coffee line, Havana Elsa.
2	"Elsa is Rollin'!"	September 17, 2012
Elsa heads out for the day in Miami to raise awareness for her coffee and to let people experience it.
3	"Meet Elsa's Boyfriend"	September 17, 2012
After Darden, Elsa's friend, takes her out for a drive, she is left shocked by the lack of air-conditioning in her friend's truck.
4	"Elsa's First Customer!"	September 17, 2012
Elsa's business reaches a milestone as she receives her first customer.
5	"Seeing the Competition"	September 17, 2012
Elsa takes a trip to her local grocery store and compares the coffee brands on the shelves with her own while imagining hers in store.
6	"Market Research"	September 17, 2012
Still in the grocery store, Elsa asks several customers if they would have Havana Elsa in their home.
7	"Surprising Marysol"	September 17, 2012
Elsa and Darden pay Marysol a visit and show off the coffee truck, leaving her shocked.
8	"Elsa's Past"	September 17, 2012
Elsa opens up to her friend and driver, Darden about her childhood
9	"Show and Tell"	September 17, 2012
Elsa takes pride in her coffee and enjoys showing it off to people.
