= The Real Housewives of Miami season 7 =

Season of television series

The Real Housewives of Miami
- Season 7
- Promotional poster via Peacock
- Starring: Alexia Nepola; Larsa Pippen; Lisa Hochstein; Guerdy Abraira; Julia Lemigova; Stephanie Shojaee
- No. of episodes: 20

Release
- Original network: Bravo
- Original release: June 11 – October 16, 2025

Season chronology
- ← Previous; Season 6

The seventh season of The Real Housewives of Miami, an American reality television series, is broadcast on Bravo. It premiered on June 11, 2025, and concluded on October 16, 2025. The season was primarily filmed in Miami, Florida. Its executive producers are Matt Anderson, Nate Green, Cooper Green, Maty Buss, Bill Fritz, James Brangert and Andy Cohen.

The season focuses on the lives of Alexia Nepola, Larsa Pippen, Lisa Hochstein, Guerdy Abraira, Julia Lemigova, and Stephanie Shojaee. Adriana de Moura, Marysol Patton and Kiki Barth are also featured in a recurring capacity.

== Cast ==
All cast members from the previous season returned except for Nicole Martin who departed the series to focus on her family. However, she made a guest appearance during the season. In November 2024, Bravo announced Stephanie Shojaee had joined the cast as a full-time housewife.

== Episodes ==
The Real Housewives of Miami season 7 episodes
No. overall	No. in season	Title	Original release date	U.S. viewers (millions)
95	1	"MIA Back in Action"	June 11, 2025	0.29
Alexia reels after Todd moves out. Tension brews between Guerdy and Julia over an awkward text exchange. Lisa and Larsa argue about loyalty in the wake of Larsa's split with Marcus.
96	2	"Miami Takes Milan"	June 18, 2025	0.31
Lisa and Larsa continue to feud when they attend a fashion show in Milan. Alexia reveals some harsh truths about her marriage.
97	3	"Worst Wedding Ever"	June 25, 2025	0.28
Alexia throws a party to celebrate Marysol's wedding but the evening is derailed by a heated argument between Julia and Guerdy.
98	4	"Boogers and Birkins"	July 2, 2025	0.28
At Adriana's baby shower for Julia and Martina, the ladies meet Larsa's friend Stephanie and Lisa makes a bad first impression.
99	5	"Miami Goddesses"	July 9, 2025	0.29
Julia sits down with Guerdy to apologize. On their way to Alexia's Goddess Party, Stephanie confronts Lisa for being two hours late.
100	6	"Major Red Flags"	July 16, 2025	0.28
At Alexia's Greek Goddess party, Lisa feels ganged up on during a narcissist exercise and Julia's recent feud with Guerdy is resurrected. Later, Lisa and Larsa sit down in an attempt to hash out their differences.
101	7	"Textual Tension"	July 23, 2025	0.28
At Guerdy's celebration of life party, Stephanie goes back and forth with Alexia about Todd, and Guerdy shocks the ladies by publicly displaying text messages between herself and Julia.
102	8	"Dueling Yachts"	July 30, 2025	0.27
Guerdy reconnects with Nicole. Later, on dueling yachts, Adriana heckles Marysol. Stephanie and Alexia continue to clash.
103	9	"Preppy, Petty People"	August 6, 2025	0.26
Julia confides in Stephanie that she's estranged from her daughters. Later, at Marysol's preppy party, various feuds are set aside as the group prepares for their upcoming trip to Spain.
104	10	"The Thrill of Seville"	August 13, 2025	0.29
The ladies embark for Seville. On their first night in Spain, Stephanie and Alexia clash. Lisa shows up late after missing her flight.
105	11	"Unfollow or Unfriend"	August 14, 2025	0.27
As the Spain trip continues, Lisa and Larsa's argument about Marcus is reignited, and Lisa's boyfriend Jody gets involved.
106	12	"Uncivil in Seville"	August 21, 2025	0.32
The women finally convince Lisa to unfollow Marcus. Adriana and Kiki clash at dinner. Stephanie makes plans with her private jet.
107	13	"Next Stop, Marbella"	August 28, 2025	0.30
Alexia and Marysol decide to skip Julia's Marbella trip to avoid Stephanie's jet rules. Lisa announces that she's finally divorced. Later, Kiki and Adriana reconcile while Stephanie confronts Alexia and Marysol at the Plaza de España.
108	14	"Navigating Friend Ships"	September 4, 2025	0.30
Back in Miami, Kiki confronts her father and Lisa talks to Jody about the future. Later, the ladies embark on a cruise.
109	15	"Birthday Blues Cruise"	September 11, 2025	0.29
On the cruise, Lisa and Larsa make amends; Alexia tells Stephanie that Marysol is the reason for their issues in Spain; and the ladies force Adriana to celebrate her birthday. Later, Guerdy goes to therapy, and Stephanie meets with Adriana to discuss Marysol.
110	16	"The Art of Arguing"	September 18, 2025	0.27
After learning that Kiki was responsible for her cheeky birthday cake, Adriana seeks to counter allegations of racism.
111	17	"Frosty Friendships"	September 25, 2025	0.26
Tensions mount between Adriana and Julia at Stephanie's party, where Adriana performs her new song.
112	18	"Reunion Part 1"	October 2, 2025	0.31
113	19	"Reunion Part 2"	October 9, 2025	0.31
114	20	"Reunion Part 3"	October 16, 2025	0.29
