= The Real Housewives of Miami season 1 =

Season of television series

The Real Housewives of Miami
- Season 1
- Cover used by iTunes (Left to right) Echevarria, Patton, Pippen, Rice, Black and De Moura
- Starring: Lea Black; Adriana de Moura; Alexia Echevarria; Marysol Patton; Larsa Pippen; Cristy Rice
- No. of episodes: 7

Release
- Original network: Bravo
- Original release: February 22 – April 5, 2011

Season chronology
- Next → Season 2

The first season of The Real Housewives of Miami, an American reality television series, was broadcast on Bravo. It aired from February 22, 2011, until April 5, 2011, and was primarily filmed in Miami, Florida. Its executive producers are Matt Anderson, Nate Green and Andy Cohen.

The Real Housewives of Miami focuses on the lives of Lea Black, Adriana De Moura, Alexia Echevarria, Marysol Patton, Larsa Pippen and Cristy Rice. It consisted of seven episodes.

This season marked the final appearances of Cristy Rice.

This season marked the first departure of Alexia Echevarria. She eventually returned for the show's 3rd season.

This season marked the first departure of Larsa Pippen. She eventually returned for the show's 4th season.

== Production and crew ==
On March 10, 2010, Bravo announced the series (then titled Miami Social Club) had been picked up as a restructuring of the 2009 series, Miami Social. Later, after filming was completed, Bravo chose instead to make it another installment in the network's The Real Housewives franchise. Bravo announced on February 3, 2011, that the series would premiere later that month and that the fourth-season premiere of The Real Housewives of New York City, originally scheduled for February 15, would be pushed back until April. Shortly after the season aired, Andy Cohen went on the record stating the reason for the series broadcast, "we put it on because everyone in America was going through such a horrible winter and we just kind of realized we had Miami on the shelf." Cohen also claimed the series had few episodes to be "a six-week kind of antidote to all the winter madness."

The season premiered with "Paradise Cost" on February 22, 2011, while the sixth episode "Miami Mamis Know Best" served as the season finale, and was aired on March 29, 2011. It was followed by a reunion special that aired on April 5, 2011, on Watch What Happens Live, which marked the conclusion of the season. Matt Anderson, Nate Green and Andy Cohen are recognized as the series' executive producers; it is produced and distributed by Purveyors of Pop.

== Cast and synopsis ==
Six housewives were featured during the first season of The Real Housewives of Miami, who were described as "homemakers, businesswomen, and philanthropists" and "six of the most connected and influential women of Miami". Shortly after the season aired, Andy Cohen described the women as "great characters".

Cristy Rice is recently divorced from NBA superstar Glen Rice, but she does not let that hold her back. Cristy balances her new phase of life being a single mom of three, running her own clothing store and living out loud while enjoying the nightlife. Larsa Pippen is an Assyrian Lebanese beauty who is a close friends to Cristy and wife of Scottie Pippen, another NBA superstar. Larsa balances her life successfully from being a wife, a mother to her four young kids, three boys and 1 girl, and a boss to her nannies she keeps firing. When Larsa is not focusing on being a wife, mother, or boss, she enjoys spending a little time on herself. Lea Black, who is originally from Texas, is a maven of Miami, juggling family, business and social events. When Lea is not raising her son, RJ, with her husband Roy Black, a top criminal defense attorney, she is running her businesses and raising money for charity. Lea has raised millions of dollars over nineteen years for troubled teens through The Blacks' Annual Gala, of which she is a founder of. Adriana De Moura, an art curator who is well-known in Miami for being the Brazilian Bombshell of the Miami art scene. Before settling in Miami and in one of Miami's most exclusive areas, Hibiscus Island, she studied French Art and Civilization at Paris' Sorbonne Institute, as well as Italian Art in Florence. De Moura takes pride in being a polyglot and cultured, knowing how to speak five languages and having traveled to over 40 countries. Alexia Echevarria, the Executive Editor of Venue Magazine is often referred to as the "Cuban Barbie." Alexia and her husband, Herman, are the epitome of the “Who's Who” in Miami as they share photo shoots with Marc Anthony to luncheons with Barack Obama. Alexia is mother to her two sons, Peter and Frankie, however she admits at times she is more of an older sister to them. Marysol Patton is a native to Miami, and having been divorced for 10 years it allows her the time and energy to focus on her career. Marysol has created and continues to run one of the premiere public relations firms in town, The Patton Group. When Marysol is not work or throwing a party for her A-list clients, she is at home with her mother, Elsa.

== Episodes ==
The Real Housewives of Miami season 1 episodes
No. overall	No. in season	Title	Original release date	U.S. viewers (millions)
1	1	"Paradise Cost"	February 22, 2011	1.21
The housewives are invited to Lea's home for a bite to eat and some catching up. The night quickly goes downhill once Adriana reveals the details about her failing marriage.
2	2	"Black Ball'd"	March 1, 2011	1.03
The time has come for the Black's Annual Gala, and the highest of the Miami society are attending. Cristy stirs the pot when she shows up with no RVSP and two uninvited friends.
3	3	"Optical Delusion"	March 8, 2011	1.30
Adriana invites the housewives to her Miami Art show. A few days prior, the artist Adriana hired isn't even close to completing the paintings she hired him to do. The night ends with everyone talking about the drama, and not the art.
4	4	"Waterfront and Center"	March 15, 2011	1.10
Alexia has kindly opened up her home and invites the ladies for a Cuban-style dinner. However, the menu isn't what vegetarian Lea expected and she throws some unnecessary words out during dinner. Adriana opens up to Lea about her relationship and financial dilemma. Simultaneously, Cristy is perplexed as to why she was delivered an invoice from Lea for being a party crasher at the Black's annual gala.
5	5	"Beach Slap"	March 22, 2011	1.19
Larsa has all the ladies attend her Italian cooking lesson at Scottie's and her private restaurant. While all the women are there, Adriana starts to put Cristy on the spot about a rumor she heard regarding Lea's gala. Lea says what's on her mind, which only adds more fuel to the fire, until Larsa's luncheon is ruined. Meanwhile, Marysol and Philippe return to Miami from their trip to Aspen, happy to start their new life together. Alexia and Cristy are participants in a charitable fashion show, but everything goes downhill once Alexia gets into a horrible car accident on her way to the event. Cristy is left to pick up the pieces and finish the show.
6	6	"Miami Mamis Know Best"	March 29, 2011	1.09
Marysol hosts her own dinner party and spices things up by inviting her mother, Elsa. Elsa is challenged by the ladies to read their energy, and Elsa says Larsa is "emotionally immature", which pushes Larsa off the deep end. Concurrently, Alexia is working to extremes to set the foundation for Peter's future as a model, which includes taking him to get signed at a modeling agency. All the while, Lea concocts a dinner party with Chef Michelle Bernstein. She has a surprise for the other housewives, and none of them know what they're about to get into.
7	7	"Watch What Happens Live: Miami Housewives Reunion"	April 5, 2011	0.72
The ladies of Miami get together live at the Watch What Happens Live studio to set the record straight with Andy Cohen.
