= Scotty Pippen Jr. =

American basketball player (born 2000)

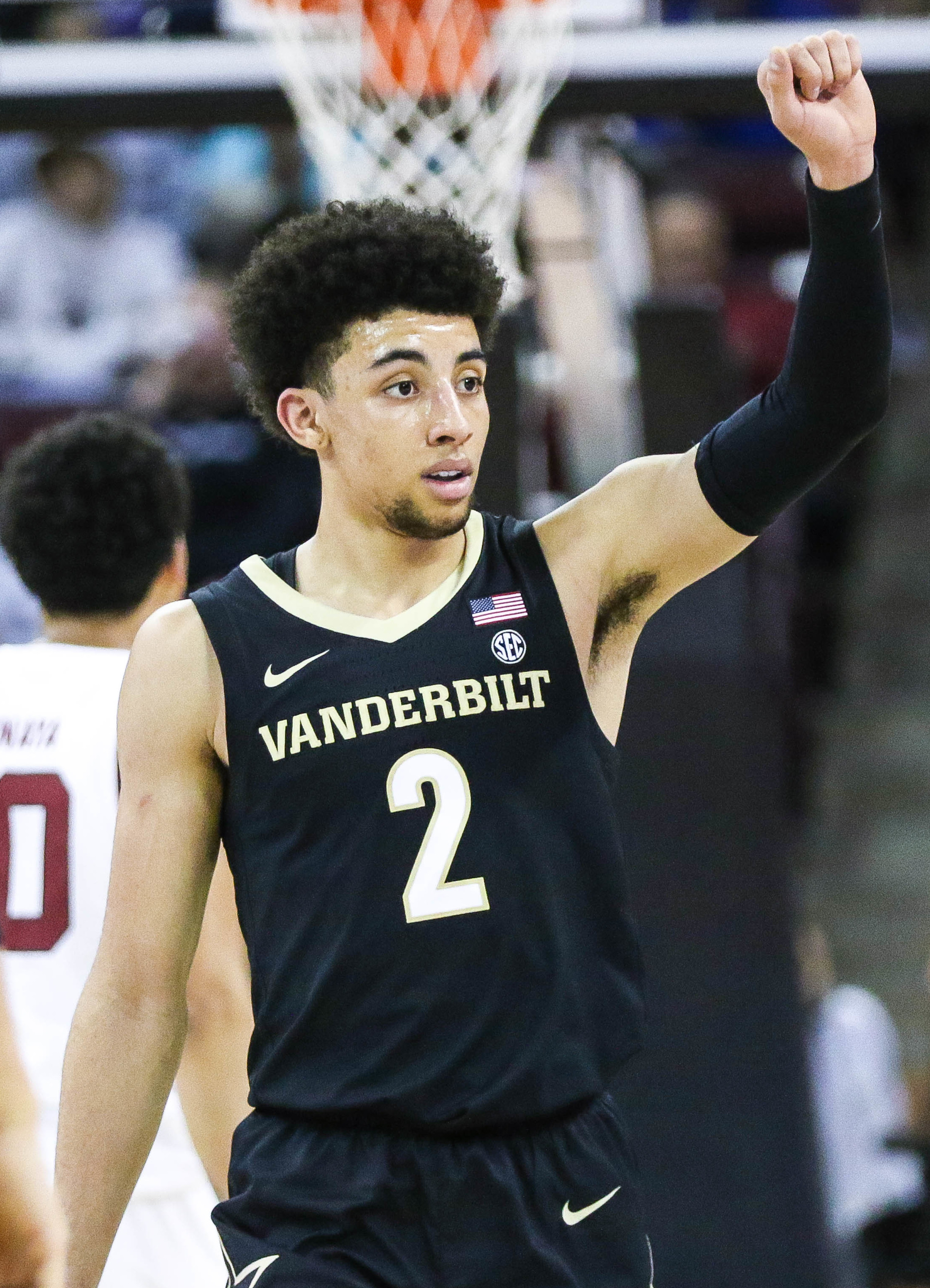
- Pippen with Vanderbilt in 2020

No. 1 – Memphis Grizzlies
- Position: Point guard
- League: NBA

Personal information
- Born: November 10, 2000 (age 26) Portland, Oregon, U.S.
- Listed height: 6 ft 1 in (1.85 m)
- Listed weight: 170 lb (77 kg)

Career information
- High school: Pine Crest School (Fort Lauderdale, Florida); Sierra Canyon (Chatsworth, California)
- College: Vanderbilt (2019–2022)
- NBA draft: 2022: undrafted
- Playing career: 2022–present

Career history
- 2022–2023: Los Angeles Lakers
- 2022–2023: →South Bay Lakers
- 2023–2024: South Bay Lakers
- 2024–present: Memphis Grizzlies

Career highlights
- NBA G League Next Up Game (2023); 2× First-team All-SEC (2021, 2022); SEC All-Freshman Team (2020)
- Stats at NBA.com
- Stats at Basketball Reference

Scotty Maurice Pippen Jr. (born November 10, 2000) is an American professional basketball player for the Memphis Grizzlies of the National Basketball Association (NBA). He played college basketball for the Vanderbilt Commodores, where he earned Southeastern Conference (SEC) All-Freshman Team recognition in 2020 and First-team All-conference recognition in 2021 and 2022.

== Early life ==
Pippen was born in Portland, Oregon, while his father, future Hall-of-Fame small forward Scottie Pippen, was playing for the Portland Trail Blazers. From kindergarten to tenth grade, Scotty attended Pine Crest School in Florida. Before his junior year, his family moved to the L.A. area, and he transferred to Sierra Canyon School in Chatsworth, California, which had a more competitive basketball team. At Sierra, he played alongside future NBA players such as Marvin Bagley III, Kenyon Martin Jr., and Cassius Stanley. As a senior, he averaged 16.3 points, 4.6 assists, and 3.6 rebounds per game and helped his team win the California Interscholastic Federation Open Division state title. Pippen competed for the Oakland Soldiers on the Amateur Athletic Union circuit. He committed to a future playing college basketball for Vanderbilt over offers from Washington State, San Francisco, Colorado State, UC Santa Barbara, and Hofstra.

== College career ==
On November 20, 2019, Pippen scored a freshman season-high 21 points in a 90–72 win over Austin Peay. In his regular season finale on March 7, 2020, he scored 21 points for a second time in an 83–74 victory over South Carolina. As a freshman, Pippen averaged 12 points and 3.6 rebounds per game, earning Southeastern Conference (SEC) All-Freshman Team honors.

The impending departures of future NBA players Aaron Nesmith and Saben Lee led to a future expectation of a leading role on the team, which came to fruition in his sophomore season. On December 27, 2020, Pippen scored 30 points in an 87–50 win over Alcorn State. On January 9, 2021, he recorded his first double-double, with 18 points and 12 assists in an 84–81 loss to Mississippi State. On January 27, 2021, Pippen scored 32 points in a 78–71 loss to Florida. As a sophomore, he averaged 20.8 points, 2.8 rebounds, and 4.9 assists per game. On April 10, 2021, Pippen declared for the 2021 NBA draft while maintaining his future college eligibility. He later withdrew from the draft returning to Vanderbilt for his junior season. On December 7, 2021, Pippen made a last second three-pointer to tie the game against Temple. As a junior, he averaged 20.4 points, 4.5 assists, 3.6 rebounds, and 1.9 steals per game. He was named to the First Team All-SEC as a junior. That season, he led the SEC in scoring. On April 18, 2022, Pippen declared for the 2022 NBA draft, forgoing his remaining future college eligibility.

== Professional career ==
=== Los Angeles Lakers (2022–2023) ===
After going undrafted in the 2022 NBA draft, Pippen signed a two-way contract with the Los Angeles Lakers on July 1, 2022, splitting time with their G-League affiliate, the South Bay Lakers, subsequently joining Los Angeles for the 2022 NBA Summer League. In his Summer League debut, Pippen scored 14 points, 6 rebounds, 3 assists, and a block in a 100–66 win over the Miami Heat. He was named to the G League's inaugural Next Up Game for the 2022–23 season.

On September 7, 2023, Pippen re-signed with the Lakers on an Exhibit 10 contract, but was waived on October 16.

=== South Bay Lakers (2023–2024) ===
On October 28, 2023, Pippen rejoined the South Bay Lakers.

=== Memphis Grizzlies (2024–present) ===
On January 16, 2024, Pippen signed a two-way contract with the Memphis Grizzlies. On October 15, Pippen's contract was converted to a standard four–year contract.

On November 2, 2024, Pippen recorded 12 points and a career-high 13 assists in a 124–107 win over the Philadelphia 76ers. On November 8, Pippen recorded his first career triple-double with 11 points, 10 rebounds, and 11 assists in a 128–104 win over the Washington Wizards. He and his father, Scottie, became the first father-son duo in NBA history to each record a triple-double. On November 23, Pippen recorded a career-high 30 points along with 10 assists in a 142–131 win over the Chicago Bulls. He made 79 appearances (21 starts) for Memphis during the 2024–25 NBA season, averaging 9.9 points, 3.3 rebounds, and 4.4 assists.

On April 20, 2025, Pippen made his playoff debut in the first round of the NBA playoffs, recording two points and four assists in a 131–80 Game 1 loss to the Oklahoma City Thunder. On April 24, he had a team-high 28 points, alongside five rebounds, five assists and three steals, in a 114–108 Game 3 loss. On April 26, Pippen had a team-high 30 points, alongside 11 rebounds and four assists, in a 117–115 Game 4 loss, eliminating the Grizzlies from the playoffs.

On October 18, 2025, it was announced that Pippen would miss at least 12 weeks after undergoing a sesamoidectomy to address a lingering left big toe injury. On February 6, 2026, Pippen made his season debut, recording 13 points, three rebounds, and six assists in a 115-135 loss to the Portland Trail Blazers. On February 21, Pippen was involved in an altercation with Myron Gardner during a 120–136 loss to the Miami Heat, one which resulted in both of their ejections; the pair were ultimately fined $35,000 each for the incident. He would appear in 10 games (including six starts) for Memphis during the regular season, averaging 11.4 points, 2.2 rebounds, and 4.7 assists. On March 13, Pippen was ruled out for the remainder of the season after undergoing another sesamoidectomy procedure.

== Career statistics ==
Legend
GP	Games played	GS	Games started	MPG	Minutes per game
FG%	Field goal percentage	3P%	3-point field goal percentage	FT%	Free throw percentage
RPG	Rebounds per game	APG	Assists per game	SPG	Steals per game
BPG	Blocks per game	PPG	Points per game	**Bold**	Career high

=== NBA ===
==== Regular season ====
Year	Team	GP	GS	MPG	FG%	3P%	FT%	RPG	APG	SPG	BPG	PPG
2022–23	L.A. Lakers	6	0	5.3	.333	.333	.556	.7	.3	.3	.2	2.3
2023–24	Memphis	21	16	**25.1**	**.493**	**.417**	.745	3.2	**4.7**	1.7	**.5**	**12.9**
2024–25	Memphis	**79**	**21**	21.3	.480	.397	.713	**3.3**	4.4	1.3	.4	9.9
2025–26	Memphis	10	6	21.2	.448	.313	**.783**	2.2	**4.7**	**1.9**	.4	11.4
Career		116	43	21.2	.477	.393	.721	3.0	4.3	1.4	.4	10.2

==== Playoffs ====
Year	Team	GP	GS	MPG	FG%	3P%	FT%	RPG	APG	SPG	BPG	PPG
2025	Memphis	4	4	32.3	.379	.357	1.000	5.5	3.5	1.0	.3	18.3
Career		4	4	32.3	.379	.357	1.000	5.5	3.5	1.0	.3	18.3

=== College ===
Year	Team	GP	GS	MPG	FG%	3P%	FT%	RPG	APG	SPG	BPG	PPG
2019–20	Vanderbilt	32	31	29.8	.393	**.362**	.709	2.8	3.6	1.1	.1	12.0
2020–21	Vanderbilt	22	22	31.8	**.428**	.358	**.850**	2.9	**4.9**	1.8	**.2**	**20.8**
2021–22	Vanderbilt	**36**	**36**	**33.1**	.416	.325	.749	**3.6**	4.5	**1.9**	**.2**	20.4
Career		90	89	31.6	.414	.343	.763	3.1	4.3	1.6	.2	17.5

== Personal life ==
Pippen is the son of Hall of Fame basketball player Scottie Pippen, who won six NBA championships with the Chicago Bulls during his 17-year career in the league, and media personality Larsa Pippen, a cast member on The Real Housewives of Miami. His mother is of Assyrian descent.

He is the cousin of Kavion Pippen who is an American professional basketball player.

His younger brother, Justin Pippen, played for the 2024–25 Michigan Wolverines basketball team before transferring to play for California Golden Bears men's basketball.

== See also ==
- List of second-generation NBA players
