= Miss USSR =

Beauty pageant

- Мисс CCCP
- Formation: 1989
- Dissolved: 1991
- Type: Beauty pageant
- Headquarters: Moscow
- Location: Soviet Union
- Members: Miss Universe; Miss World; Miss International
- Official language: Russian

Miss USSR (Russian: Мисс CCCP) was a national beauty contest held in the Soviet Union. The first winner was crowned in May 1989. It ran for three years through to the dissolution of the Union in 1991.

== Titleholders ==
Year	Miss USSR	Hometown	Notes	Ref.
1991	Ilmira Shamsutdinova	Saratov, Russian SFSR	Top 6, Miss Universe 1996 (as Miss Russia)	
1990	Yulia Lemigova	Moscow, RSFSR	2nd runner-up, Miss Universe 1991	
1990	Maria Kezha	Vitebsk, Byelorussian SSR	Dethroned following marriage decision	
1989	Yulia Sukhanova	Moscow, Russian SFSR		

== Representatives at International Beauty Pageants ==
=== Representatives at Miss Universe ===
Year	Miss Universe USSR	Placement	Special Awards
1990	Evia Staļbovska	Unplaced	
1991	Yulia Lemigova	2nd Runner-Up	

=== Representatives at Miss World ===
Year	Miss World USSR	Placement	Special Awards
1989	Anna Gorbunova	Unplaced	Miss Photogenic
1990	Lauma Zemzare	Unplaced	

=== Representatives at Miss International ===
Year	Miss International USSR	Placement	Special awards
1990	Irina Vassilenko	3rd Runner-Up	

=== Representatives at Miss Charm International ===
Year	Miss Charm USSR	Placement	Special awards
1989	Olga Perminova	Top 16	
1990	Mariya Smirnova	Unplaced	
