= The Real Housewives of Miami season 4 =

Season of television series

The Real Housewives of Miami
- Season 4
- Cover used by Peacock
- Starring: Alexia Nepola; Larsa Pippen; Lisa Hochstein; Guerdy Abraira; Julia Lemigova; Nicole Martin
- No. of episodes: 14

Release
- Original network: Peacock
- Original release: December 16, 2021 – March 10, 2022

Season chronology
- ← Previous; Season 3 Next → Season 5

The fourth season of The Real Housewives of Miami, an American reality television series, premiered on Peacock on December 16, 2021. The season was primarily filmed in Miami, Florida. Its executive producers are Matt Anderson, Nate Green, Cooper Green and Andy Cohen.

The season focuses on Guerdy Abraira, Alexia Nepola, Lisa Hochstein, Julia Lemigova, Nicole Martin and Larsa Pippen. Adriana De Moura, Marysol Patton and Kiki Barth are also featured in a recurring capacity.

== Production and crew ==
In November 2020, The Real Housewives executive producer Andy Cohen said that there were talks to return the show for a fourth season on the streaming service Peacock. In February 2021, the series was confirmed to be making a return. Shortly after the announcement previous cast members Joanna Krupa and Lea Black both stated that they were not interested in appearing on the new season. The complete redesign of the intro and taglines was the first intro redesign since The Real Housewives of Dallas’ in 2019.

== Cast ==
In October 2021, Peacock confirmed season 4 would premiere in December 2021 with returning housewives Alexia Nepola, Lisa Hochstein and Larsa Pippen being joined by Guerdy Abraira, Julia Lemigova and Nicole Martin. It was also announced that Adriana de Moura and Marysol Patton would return as friends of the housewives with Kiki Barth also joining as a friend.

== Episodes ==
The Real Housewives of Miami season 4 episodes
No. overall	No. in season	Title	Original release date	U.S. viewers (millions)
42	1	"¡Bienvenidos! Same Beaches, New Shade"	December 16, 2021	0.37
The ladies reunite with an old friend and meet new ones; Alexia seeks closure about her marriage.
43	2	"Sushi Rolls and Wedding Woes"	December 16, 2021	0.31
Alexia plans her wedding but hits multiple roadblocks; sushi night reveals Todd and Peter's drama.
44	3	"Painted With Pride"	December 23, 2021	0.34
Alexia meets Herman’s lover; Adriana hosts Martina’s first art show while juggling two dates.
45	4	"It’s Your Party and I’ll Cry if I Want To"	December 30, 2021	0.32
Julia and Guerdy share shocking revelations about their past; Larsa goes house hunting; Adriana receives a foot massage that rubs Martina the wrong way; the ladies celebrate Julia's birthday, but Adriana and Guerdy come to blows.
46	5	"Family Therapy"	January 6, 2022	0.24
Julia aims to resolve her birthday drama; Nicole contemplates rebuilding a relationship with her dad; Alexia's family is torn apart as her fiancé and son go head-to-head.
47	6	"Flirting at the Faena"	January 13, 2022	0.24
Alexia finally finds her perfect wedding venue, only for it to fall through; Lisa hosts a flirtatious slumber party at the Faena Hotel; Nicole hopes to reconcile with her father, but it's not the reunion she had hoped for.
48	7	"Bling, Boobs and Bickering"	January 20, 2022	0.25
The ladies head to the Hamptons, but Lisa wants to go back home when she learns they have to share rooms; Nicole confronts Alexia about her snappy attitude; Marysol drops a bomb that leaves everyone wondering whether they can trust Nicole.
49	8	"Le Fin?"	January 27, 2022	0.24
The ladies try to put last night's drama behind them; Julia blindsides Adriana with a proposal.
50	9	"Hamptons Hangover"	February 3, 2022	0.29
The house panics as Julia has a medical emergency; Adriana threatens to derail Larsa’s work event.
51	10	"Looking for Trouble"	February 10, 2022	0.27
A single ladies’ night goes wrong after Larsa’s celebrity friend is brought up.
52	11	"Versace and Venom"	February 17, 2022	0.25
The ladies throw Alexia a bachelorette party, but the fun quickly descends into chaos.
53	12	"No Wedding and a Funeral"	February 24, 2022	0.34
As her mother’s health takes a turn for the worse, Alexia’s dream wedding begins to crumble.
54	13	"Reunion Part 1"	March 3, 2022	0.20
The ladies reunite; Julia makes shocking revelations; Larsa defends her looks and OnlyFans.
55	14	"Reunion Part 2"	March 10, 2022	0.30
As the reunion concludes, Adriana and Larsa go head-to-head over a certain someone’s penis.
