= Justin Pippen =

American basketball player (born 2005)

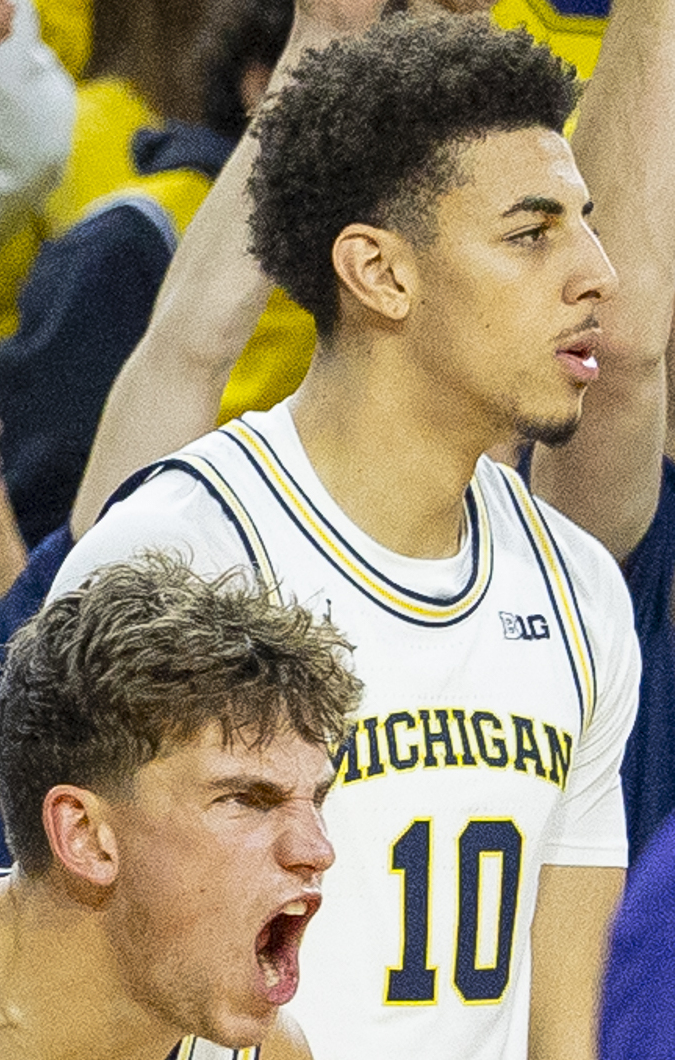
- Pippen (No. 10) in 2024

No. 10 – Ohio State Buckeyes
- Position: Point guard
- Conference: Big Ten Conference

Personal information
- Born: July 11, 2005 (age 21) Los Angeles, California, U.S.
- Listed height: 6 ft 3 in (1.91 m)
- Listed weight: 190 lb (86 kg)

Career information
- High school: Sierra Canyon (Los Angeles, California)
- College: Michigan (2024–2025); California (2025–2026); Ohio State (2026–present)

Justin Pippen (born July 11, 2005) is an American college basketball player for the Ohio State Buckeyes of the Big Ten Conference. He previously played for the Michigan Wolverines and California Golden Bears. He is the son of Hall of Fame NBA player Scottie Pippen and reality television personality Larsa Pippen, as well as the younger brother of current Memphis Grizzlies player, Scotty Pippen Jr.

== Life and career ==
Pippen is the sixth of Scottie Pippen's seven children and his fourth son. Born on July 11, 2005 in California, he is the third son and third of four children Pippen has with Larsa Pippen and younger brother of Scotty Pippen Jr. He is first-cousins with Kavion Pippen. His half-sister, Taylor Pippen, was an All-American volleyball player at Southern Illinois University. In four seasons playing for the Sierra Canyon School Trailblazers, the team achieved three 20-win seasons and an overall four-year record of 91-22. The 2022—23 team saw senior Ashton Hardaway (son of Penny Hardaway) join Bronny James and Bryce James (sons of LeBron James) during Pippen's junior year. In October 2022, Pippen was on an Overtime Elite team of California players featuring the James brothers, Hardaway and Drew Fisher (son of Derek Fisher).

Rather than play on the AAU summer circuit before his senior year, he spent time practicing with his older brother, Scotty Pippen Jr., doing NBA offseason workout sessions that at times included Kenyon Martin Jr., Devin Booker, Jalen Green and Kevin Durant. Among Pippen's teammates in high school were Isaiah Elohim, Bronny James and Amari Bailey, and he attributes his defensive skills to practicing against James and Bailey, especially as an on-ball defender. Like his older brother, who had no offers until the end of his junior year of high school, he was a basketball late bloomer. His father averaged just 4.3 points per game as a freshman in college.

One of his biggest games was a 24-point (21-point second half) performance in a 74–68 win over USA Today number three ranked Harvard-Westlake to bring Sierra Canyon's record to 21–1 on January 19, 2024. Pippen made 6 three-point shots. Sierra trailed the defending state Open Division champions and Los Angeles Times number one ranked team by 8 points with six minutes left before posting an 18–0 run.

As a senior, Pippen averaged 16.5 points, 4.9 assists & 4.5 rebounds, and he was a top 100 member of the national class of 2024. 247Sports listed him with a 71st in its composite ranking for the 2024 class. He took official visits to UC Santa Barbara, Texas A&M and Michigan before choosing Michigan over offers from Cal, Florida, Texas A&M and Stanford. Pippen was going to sign with Cal, but Michigan became a late contender for his services when Dusty May was hired to replace Juwan Howard as head coach and recruited Pippen as a combo guard.

College recruiting
Name	Hometown	School	Height	Weight	Commit date
Justin Pippen; CG	Chatsworth, California	Sierra Canyon	6 ft 3 in (1.91 m)	180 lb (82 kg)	Apr 19, 2024
Justin Pippen; CG	Recruit ratings: Rivals: 247Sports: On3: ESPN: (84)				
Overall recruit ranking: Rivals: 73 247Sports: 70 On3: 103 ESPN: 73
Note: In many cases, Scout, Rivals, 247Sports, On3, and ESPN may conflict in their listings of height and weight.; In these cases, the average was taken. ESPN grades are on a 100-point scale.; Sources: "Michigan 2024 Basketball Commitments". Rivals.; "2024 Team Ranking". Rivals.

== College career ==
=== Michigan ===
Pippen played in 28 games off the bench for the 2024–25 Michigan Wolverines averaging 1.6 points in 6.7 minutes per game. He only played 10 or more minutes five times. On December 22, 2024, Pippen posted his season high 10 points against the Purdue-Fort Wayne Mastodons. He also posted career bests at the time in rebounds (4) and assists (2). Pippen's last game appearance for Michigan was in the March 9, 2025 regular season finale against Michigan State in the rivalry game, where he chipped in two points and an assist. On March 24, 2025, Pippen entered the NCAA transfer portal. He left the team while they were still participating in the 2025 NCAA tournament and did not travel with the Wolverines for any postseason games, including the 2025 Big Ten tournament. Michigan won the Big Ten tournament championship and reached the Sweet Sixteen round of the NCAA tournament in 2025.

=== California ===
During the 2025 offseason, Cal did a near complete overhaul of its roster, which included Pippen returning to his home state from the transfer portal. In his first 10 appearances for the 2025–26 Cal Bears, he started at point guard, scored at least 13 points in nine of them, and took the team lead in assists, steals, and blocked shots. On December 2, Pippen contributed 23 points against Utah to lead Cal to a 79–72 victory and the school's first 7–1 start since the 2016–17 Bears team. On December 9, Pippen posted a game-high and career-high 24 points in a 93–71 victory against NCAA Division II Dominican Penguins. Pippen was sidelined for the December 13 victory over Northwestern State and his efforts were missed on both ends of the court. The victory gave Cal its first 10–1 start since the 2014–15 team. After being sidelined for two games, Pippen returned on December 21 to help Cal defeat Columbia to reach 12–1. The last time the school started 12–1 had been the 1959–60 team that entered the 1960 NCAA University Division basketball tournament with one loss and were national runner-up. Pippen, who was averaging 14.6 points per game, was leading the team with a 4.3 assists per game at the time of the hot 12–1 start. Pippen twice tallied 5 steals: Against No. 23 Virginia on January 7 (along with 17 points) and versus No. 6 Duke on January 14 (along with 10 points). On January 17, Pippen posted 19 points, including 2 free throws with 10 seconds remaining, and 5 assists in an 84–78 victory against No. 14-ranked North Carolina. He followed that up with 18 points and 6 assists in the January 24 rivalry game victory against Stanford. On February 25, Pippen tied his career high with 24 points (19 in the second half) including a jump shot and 4 out of 4 free throws as part of a comeback in the final minute of the victory against SMU. Following the regular season, he was an All-ACC honorable mention selection. In the 2026 National Invitation Tournament, Pippen posted 18 points, 6 assists and 4 steals in the opening game against UIC. Pippen finished his first season at Cal with 61 steals which ranks fourth all-time on the school's single-season list. Following the season, he entered the NCAA transfer portal for the second time in as many years. Pippen averaged 14.2 points, 4.6 assists and 3.9 rebounds for Cal.

=== Ohio State ===
On April 10, 2026, Pippen committed to play for the Ohio State Buckeyes. He was the first player since Roddy Gayle Jr. to transfer within the Michigan-Ohio State rivalry. Pippen was also head coach Dusty May's first high school signee at Michigan, leaving one year after joining the program and one year before the Wolverines won the 2026 national championship.
