= Kavion Pippen =

American basketball player (born 1996)

Free agent
- Position: Center

Personal information
- Born: October 15, 1996 (age 30) Hamburg, Arkansas, U.S.
- Listed height: 6 ft 10 in (2.08 m)
- Listed weight: 240 lb (109 kg)

Career information
- High school: Hamburg (Hamburg, Arkansas)
- College: Three Rivers (2015–2017); Southern Illinois (2017–2019)
- NBA draft: 2019: undrafted
- Playing career: 2019–present

Career history
- 2019–2020: Austin Spurs
- 2021: Al Sadd
- 2021: Étoile Sportive de Radès
- 2021–2022: Real Valladolid
- 2022: Soles de Mexicali
- 2022–2023: Long Island Nets
- 2023: Nelson Giants
- 2024–2025: Maine Celtics

Career highlights
- 2× Third-team All-MVC (2018, 2019); MVC All-Defensive Team (2019); MVC All-Newcomer Team (2018)
- Stats at Basketball Reference

Kavion Pippen (born October 15, 1996) is an American professional basketball player who last played for the Maine Celtics of the NBA G League. He played college basketball for the Southern Illinois Salukis.

== High school and college career ==
Pippen attended Hamburg High School in Hamburg, Arkansas, and then played his first two college basketball seasons for Three Rivers College.

In 2017, Pippen transferred to Southern Illinois. In two seasons for the Salukis, Pippen averaged 12.4 points, 5.8 rebounds and 1.7 blocks per game.

== Professional career ==
=== Austin Spurs (2019–2020) ===
After going undrafted in the 2019 NBA draft, Pippen spent preseason with the Golden State Warriors. On October 26, 2019, he was acquired by the Austin Spurs of the NBA G League. In 27 games during the 2019–20 season, he averaged 7.2 points and 4.0 rebounds per game.

=== Al Sadd (2021) ===
In January 2021, Pippen joined Al Sadd of the Qatari Basketball League. He appeared in one game for Al Sadd.

=== Étoile Sportive de Radès (2021) ===
In March 2021, Pippen joined Étoile Sportive de Radès of the Tunisian Championnat National A. In 14 games, he averaged 17.7 points, 10.1 rebounds, 1.1 assists and 2.4 blocks per game.

=== Real Valladolid (2021–2022) ===
On August 13, 2021, Pippen signed with Real Valladolid Baloncesto of the LEB Oro. In 34 games during the 2021–22 season, he averaged 11.0 points and 5.1 rebounds per game.

=== Soles de Mexicali (2022) ===
In August 2022, Pippen joined Mexican team Soles de Mexicali. In 14 games during the 2022 LNBP season, he averaged 9.4 points and 5.0 rebounds per game.

=== Long Island Nets (2022–2023) ===
In October 2022, Pippen joined the Long Island Nets for the 2022–23 NBA G League season. In 23 games, he averaged 8.0 points, 5.0 rebounds and 1.4 assists per game.

=== Nelson Giants (2023) ===
On April 15, 2023, Pippen signed with the Nelson Giants for the rest of the 2023 New Zealand NBL season. He parted ways with the Giants on June 8, 2023. In nine games, he averaged 15.3 points, 5.1 rebounds and 1.7 assists per game.

On October 28, 2023, Pippen returned to the Long Island Nets, but was waived on November 8.

=== Maine Celtics (2024–2025) ===
On October 26, 2024, Pippen was selected by the Maine Celtics in the 2024 NBA G League draft.

== Personal life ==
Pippen is the nephew of former NBA player Scottie Pippen. His cousin are fellow basketball players Scotty Pippen Jr. and Justin Pippen. He is also cousins with volleyball player Taylor Pippen.
