= The Real Housewives of Miami season 2 =

Season of television series

The Real Housewives of Miami
- Season 2
- Cover used by iTunes (Left to right) De Moura, Patton, Quincoces, Krupa, Black, Sierra and Hochstein
- Starring: Lea Black; Adriana de Moura; Marysol Patton; Lisa Hochstein; Joanna Krupa; Ana Quincoces; Karent Sierra
- No. of episodes: 18

Release
- Original network: Bravo
- Original release: September 13, 2012 – January 8, 2013

Season chronology
- ← Previous; Season 1 Next → Season 3

The second season of The Real Housewives of Miami, an American reality television series, was broadcast on Bravo. It aired from September 13, 2012, until January 8, 2013, and was primarily filmed in Miami, Florida. Its executive producers are Matt Anderson, Nate Green and Andy Cohen.

The Real Housewives of Miami focuses on the lives of Lea Black, Adriana De Moura, Marysol Patton, Lisa Hochstein, Joanna Krupa, Ana Quincoces and Karent Sierra. It consisted of eighteen episodes.

This season marked the final regular appearances of Marysol Patton and Ana Quincoces. It also marked the final regular appearance of Karent Sierra.

== Production and crew ==
The Real Housewives of Miami was officially green-lit for the return of the series for a second season by Bravo, after averaging 1.09 million total viewers for its first season. The reunion was filmed on November 30, 2012, and later aired in two-parts. The season premiered with "A Tale of Two Miamis" on September 13, 2012, while the fifteenth episode "Healing Hole" served as the season finale, and was aired on December 20, 2012. It was followed by a two-part reunion special that aired on December 27, 2012 and January 3, 2013, and a "Lost Footage" episode on January 8, 2013, which marked the conclusion of the season. Matt Anderson, Nate Green and Andy Cohen are recognized as the series' executive producers; it is produced and distributed by Purveyors of Pop.

== Cast and synopsis ==
Three of the six housewives featured on the first season of The Real Housewives of Miami returned for the second installment. Larsa Pippen and Cristy Rice were let go from the series. Alexia Echevarria stepped back during the second series and was reduced to a recurring role. Echevarria decided to focus most of her time looking after her 13-year-old son after he had been injured in a car accident. With the departure of 2 main cast members and the demotion of another, it allowed room for 4 new cast members to join the series which included, bombshell Lisa Hochstein, supermodel Joanna Krupa, successful lawyer and chef Ana Quincoces and celebrity dentist Karent Sierra.

== Episodes ==
The Real Housewives of Miami season 2 episodes
No. overall	No. in season	Title	Original release date	U.S. viewers (millions)
8	1	"A Tale of Two Miamis"	September 13, 2012	1.06
The veteran housewives are met with a new set of socialites.
9	2	"Text, Lies and Your Smile Is Fake"	September 20, 2012	1.02
Joanna and Karent each take different approaches when discussing the future with the special men in their lives, while Adriana has difficulty being vulnerable with her fiancé. The ladies attend the South Beach Wine & Food Festival, where Karent questions Ana's past behavior.
10	3	"A Mynt Meltdown"	September 27, 2012	0.96
Adriana persists in diverting attention away from discussing marriage with Frederic, while one model couple shows signs that not everything is picture perfect. Tensions build up at Mynt Lounge's 10th anniversary celebration, where Adriana flirts with Joanna's fiancé.
11	4	"She Beat Me to the Tweet!"	October 4, 2012	0.84
Romain sets the boundaries with Joanna after her meltdown at his club's anniversary celebration. Adriana poses in a revealing photo shoot and participates in the Dali Miami Art exhibit. Joanna receives some cooking advice from Ana. After Elaine makes some serious claims directed at Marysol, Ana comes to her friend's defense.
12	5	"Eager Beaver"	October 11, 2012	0.87
Joanna tries to mend a struggling relationship. Karent receives some advice on how to deal with the mean-spirited people in her life. Meanwhile, drama flows when all the ladies attend the Hearts & Stars Gala. Karent gets a warning about Adriana, and Alexia throws her first bash in months.
13	6	"Sexting Candles"	October 18, 2012	0.76
Alexia hosts Venue Magazine's cover party, where tensions start to boil. Adriana plans to confront Karent, but the conversation unexpectedly escalates. Marysol expresses her frustration with Lea and Joanna discovers the downside to being a supermodel. Hidden e-mails are discovered, leaving a relationship in the balance.
14	7	"Bras and Brawls: Part 1"	October 25, 2012	0.85
Karent continues to rub some of the ladies the wrong way, which makes things worse when Adriana discovers comments made in a newspaper article featuring Karent. Lisa and Lea are in high gear preparing for their charity functions. On the night of Lisa's lingerie event, no one expects what can happen with Miami socialites in skimpy underwear and Joe Francis in town.
15	8	"Bras and Brawls: Part 2"	October 28, 2012	1.35
Lisa's lingerie party revs up when Elaine Lancaster and Karent's friend have a confrontation. Adriana takes it upon herself to put a stop to Karent, who is seen as the source of drama. Joanna, on the warpath after Joe Francis levies heavy allegations against her and her sister, comes to Karent's defense, building to a shocking climax. Note: This episode aired on a special night — Sunday at 10PM.
16	9	"Conflicting Conflict"	November 1, 2012	1.09
Tensions still run high between Joanna and Adriana as everyone prepares for the Black's Annual Gala. Lea calls on her friend, "cosmic cheerleader" Norman Baker, to re-balance everyone's energy. Marysol and Ana choose not to attend the Gala and have a little girl time where divorce is the big topic of conversation.
17	10	"A Better or Bitter Place"	November 11, 2012	1.63
Alexia invites the ladies for a summit dinner to get to the root of the drama that has fractured the group. Lea puts on a brave face and attends despite the heartbreaking news about her dog. Joanna participates in the Model Beach Volleyball Tournament, but Romain isn't there to support her.
18	11	"Uncomfortably Public Relations"	November 15, 2012	1.13
Lea is advised to patch things up with Marysol, but discord takes center stage when the ladies attend Miami socialite Lisa Pliner's shoe showcase. Marta moves back to Joanna and Romain's home and Karent tries to smooth things over with the ladies by organizing a dinner party.
19	12	"Parents Fly South"	November 29, 2012	1.02
Joanna's mother comes to Miami and a mother-daughter heart-to-heart about the future leads to tears. Adriana continues to mull over a possible future as Frederic's wife while she organizes a 50th wedding anniversary party in Frederic's parents' honor. Elaine and Marysol meet face to face in an attempt to settle their differences. Lisa invites the ladies and their families to her home for a Passover Seder and goes out of her way to honor her in-laws' high expectations when they stop by for a visit.
20	13	"Elsa Foretells a Storm"	December 6, 2012	0.95
The ladies get ready for their trip to Bimini which they hope will be a relaxing time of fun and repairing open wounds. But Elsa predicts that the trip will hit a snag. Lea unleashes her fun side and new alliances begin to take shape but one housewife gets some unsettling news that sets the drama back in motion.
21	14	"Surrounded by Hot Water"	December 13, 2012	1.12
When a family emergency arises Karent puts the article surrounding Rodolfo on the backburner. A peaceful dinner ends in a heated discussion when Lea and Marysol finally get to the bottom of their problems with each other.
22	15	"Healing Hole"	December 20, 2012	1.25
The trip to Bimini concludes as the girls find peace amidst the stormy weather and return to Miami with a new outlook on the future and their personal relationships.
23	16	"Reunion: Part 1"	December 27, 2012	1.21
The ladies of The Real Housewives of Miami sit down with Andy Cohen to discuss the past season.
24	17	"Reunion: Part 2"	January 3, 2013	1.28
The ladies of The Real Housewives of Miami sit down with Andy Cohen to discuss the past season.
25	18	"Lost Footage"	January 8, 2013	0.93
Andy Cohen opens the Bravo vault and reveals all the clips that didn't make it into this season, which includes Lea's friendship with her housekeeper, and Adriana attempting to act. Parts of the reunion that weren't inserted into already aired reunion are also included in this episode.
