= The Real Housewives of Miami =

American reality television series

- Genre: Reality television
- Starring: Lea Black; Adriana de Moura; Alexia Nepola; Marysol Patton; Larsa Pippen; Cristy Rice; Lisa Hochstein; Joanna Krupa; Ana Quincoces; Karent Sierra; Guerdy Abraira; Julia Lemigova; Nicole Martin; Stephanie Shojaee
- Country of origin: United States
- Original language: English
- No. of seasons: 7
- No. of episodes: 114 (list of episodes)

Production
- Executive producers: Matt Anderson; Nate Green; Cooper Green; Maty Buss; Drew Hogl; Swaga Deb; Bill Fritz; Darren Ward; James Brangert; Andy Cohen
- Camera setup: Multiple
- Running time: 41–43 minutes
- Production company: Purveyors of Pop

Original release
- Network: Bravo
- Release: February 22, 2011 – November 14, 2013
- Release: November 1, 2023 – present
- Network: Peacock
- Release: December 16, 2021 – March 23, 2023

Related
- Miami Social; Havana Elsa

The Real Housewives of Miami, abbreviated RHOM, is an American reality television series broadcast on Bravo. The Miami series is the seventh installment of The Real Housewives franchise, and it follows the personal and professional lives of women who live in or near Miami, Florida. It has aired seven seasons in total; with the first season having premiered on February 22, 2011, and the most recent season, seventh season, premiered on June 11, 2025.

The first season consisted of original cast members: Lea Black, Adriana de Moura, Alexia Nepola, Marysol Patton, Larsa Pippen and Cristy Rice. The shows current cast includes Guerdy Abraira, Lisa Hochstein, Julia Lemigova, Nepola, Pippen and Stephanie Shojaee, with Kiki Barth, de Moura and Patton appearing as friends of the housewives. Previous housewives who have left the show include Black, Joanna Krupa, Rice, Ana Quincoces, Karent Sierra, and Nicole Martin.

Bravo broadcast the first three seasons, after which the show was effectively cancelled. It was revived in 2021 by Peacock, which aired seasons 4 and 5 before Bravo rebroadcast it for season six. Commercially, season one had the highest average viewership of 1.09 million, while season five had the lowest at 0.25 million, despite being aired several months prior on Peacock.

== Overview ==
=== 2010–2013: Original run ===
On March 10, 2010, Bravo announced a new series called Miami Social Club, which was a restructure of the 2009 series Miami Social. However, after filming, the network decided to turn it into an installment of the network's The Real Housewives franchise. Lea Black, Adriana de Moura, Alexia Echevarria, Marysol Patton, Larsa Pippen, and Cristy Rice were announced as the show's main cast members, with no recurring characters. The first season premiered on February 22, 2011, and concluded on April 5, 2011. After the first season, both Pippen and Rice left the show for undisclosed reasons.

Bravo renewed the show for a second season, which began on September 13, 2012, and concluded on January 8, 2013. Black, de Moura, and Patton returned as the series' main cast members, while four new housewives were added: Joanna Krupa, Lisa Hochstein, Ana Quincoces and Karent Sierra. Echevarria returned to the show as a recurring cast member to focus on her son Frankie, who had been injured in a car accident in 2011.

The third season was renewed by Bravo and aired from August 12 to November 14, 2013. Black, de Moura, Hochstein, and Krupa returned as the show's main cast members. Echevarria was promoted back to a full-time cast member, Quincoces and Patton returned as recurring characters. Additionally, Sierra appeared as a guest throughout the season. After season three, Bravo confirmed the cancellation of the Miami series, making it the franchise's second cancellation after The Real Housewives of D.C..

=== 2020–present: Revival ===
Andy Cohen, the show's executive producer and reunion host, stated in November 2020 that talks were underway to return the show to Peacock. The series' return date was confirmed in February 2021. Season four premiered on December 16, 2021, and ended on March 10, 2022. The entire cast was rebooted, including six housewives as main cast members: Lisa Hochstein, Alexia Nepola (formerly Echevarria), and Larsa Pippen from previous seasons, as well as Guerdy Abraira, Julia Lemigova and Nicole Martin as new cast members. Adriana de Moura and Marysol Patton, both from the original cast, appeared in recurring roles, as did Kiki Barth, who was added to the rebooted cast. Previous cast members, Lea Black and Joanna Krupa, were asked but declined in returning to the show.

Peacock renewed the show for a fifth season in October 2022, confirming its premiere date in December 2022. All of the main housewives returned for the fifth season, as did all of the recurring cast members. Black, who was a main cast member in the first three original seasons, appeared as a guest throughout the season. The fifth season began on December 8, 2022, and ended on March 23, 2023; the first four episodes aired on Thursday, December 8, with new episodes released weekly thereafter.

Bravo announced in May 2023 that the sixth season would premiere on their network, and also distributed through Peacock. All of the main housewives returned for the sixth season, as did all of the recurring cast members. Ana Quincoces, who was a main cast member in season two, appeared as a guest. The sixth season premiered on November 1, 2023.

Bravo renewed the show for a seventh season in May 2024. In July 2024, Larsa Pippen confirmed that she would be returning for the seventh season. In August 2024, Lisa Hochstein confirmed her return for the seventh season. In September 2024, Nicole Martin announced her decision to depart the show as a full-time cast member, to focus on her family. In November 2024, it was announced that new housewife Stephanie Shojaee would be joining the cast as a full-time cast member.

The first teaser trailer for the seventh season was aired during the season fourteen finale of The Real Housewives of Beverly Hills, on April 15, 2025. The rest of the main housewives returned for the seventh season, as did all of the recurring cast members. Martin, who was a main cast member in seasons four through six, appeared as a guest during the season. The seventh season premiered on June 11, 2025. Following the conclusion of the seventh season, it was reported the series was placed on hiatus by Bravo.

== Cast ==
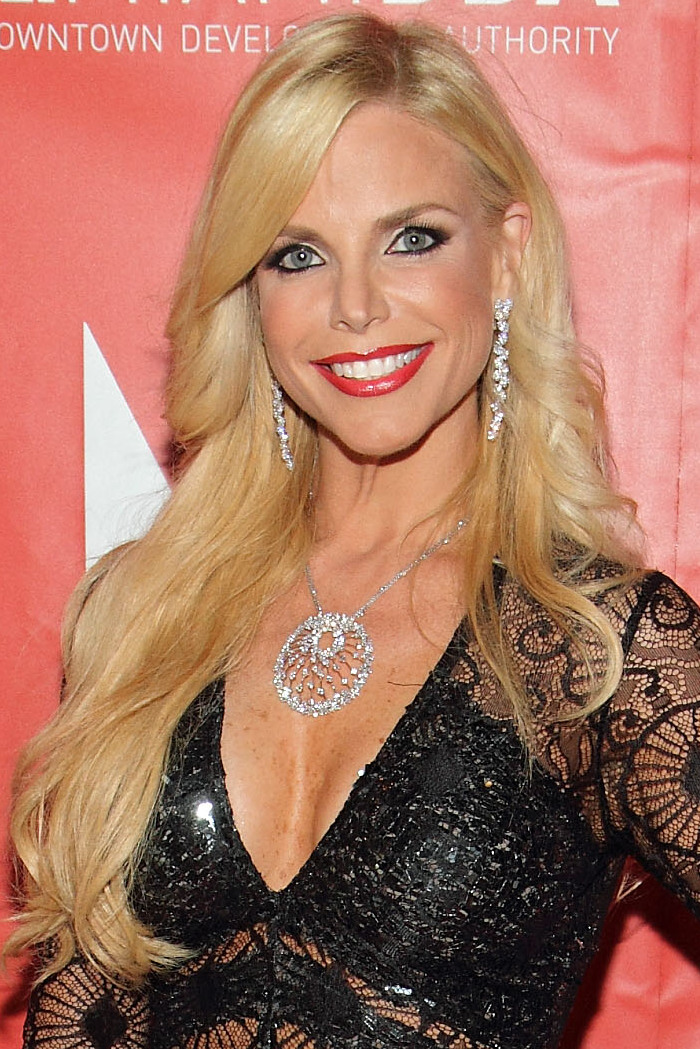
Alexia Nepola

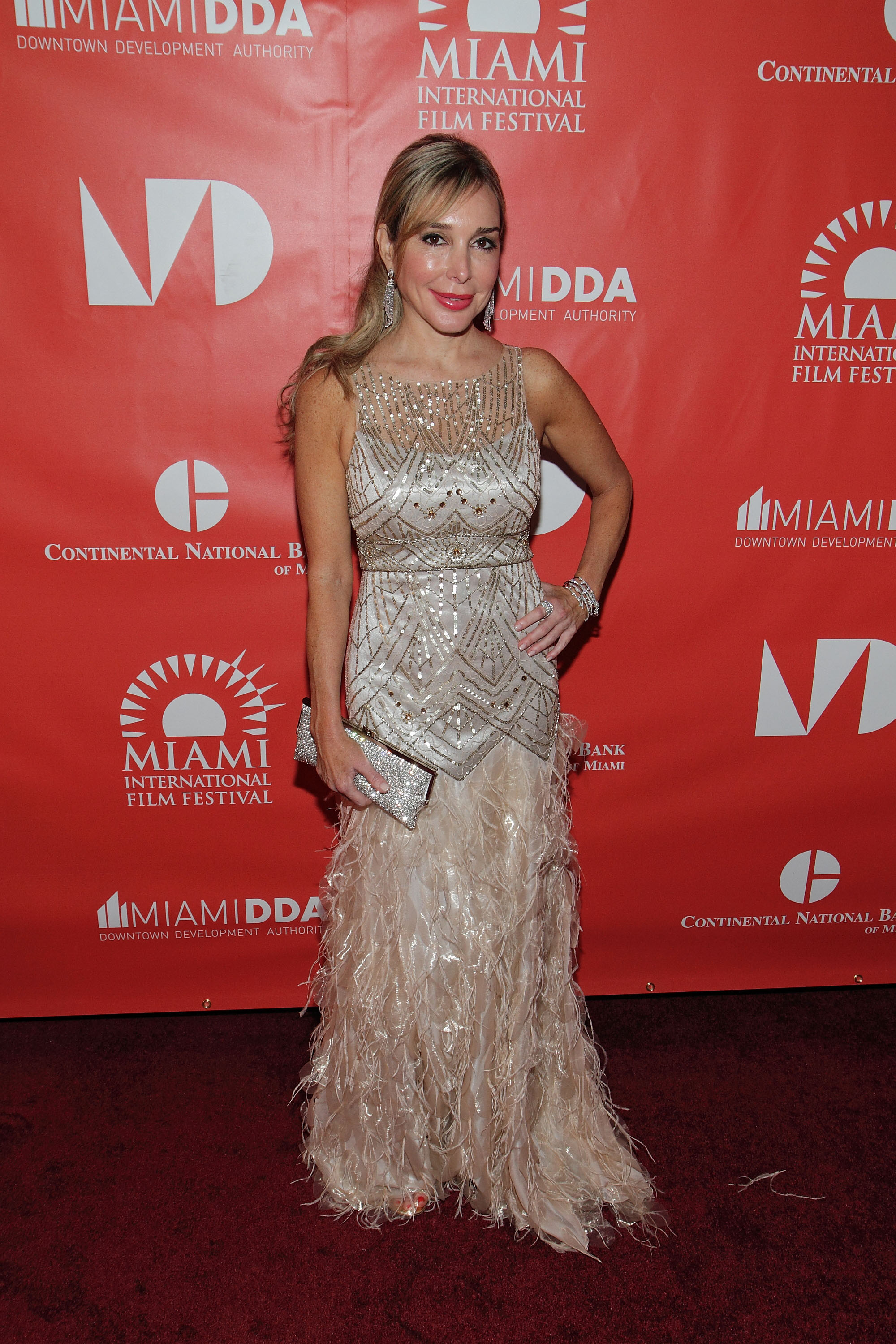
Marysol Patton

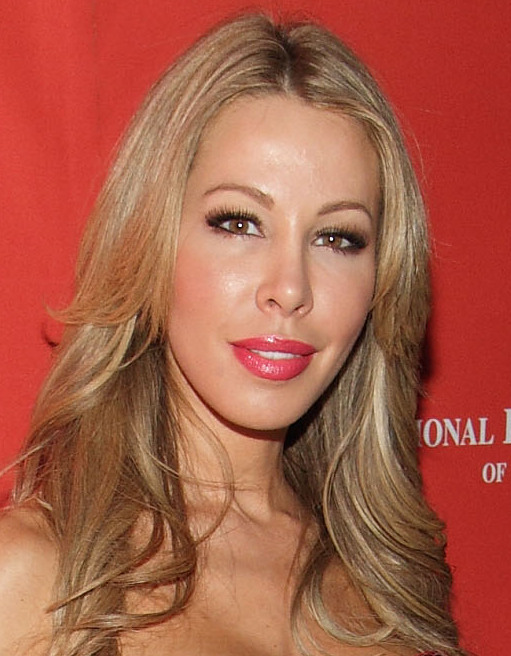
Lisa Hochstein

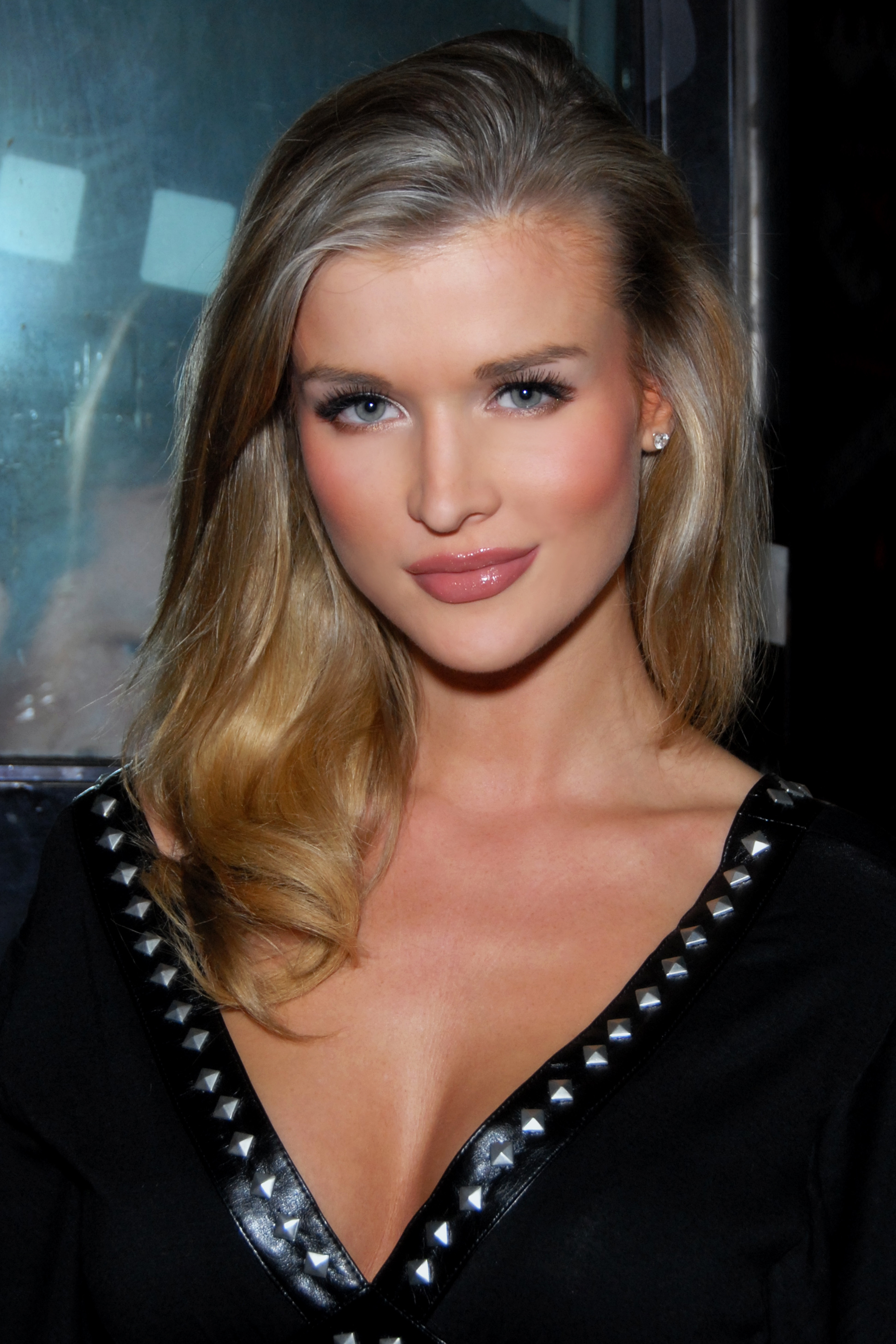
Joanna Krupa

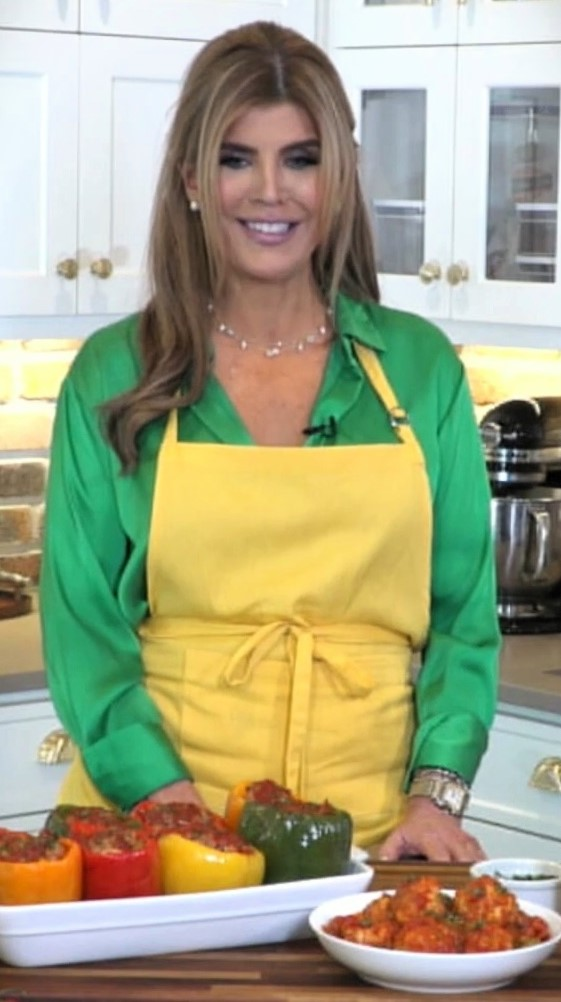
Ana Quincoces

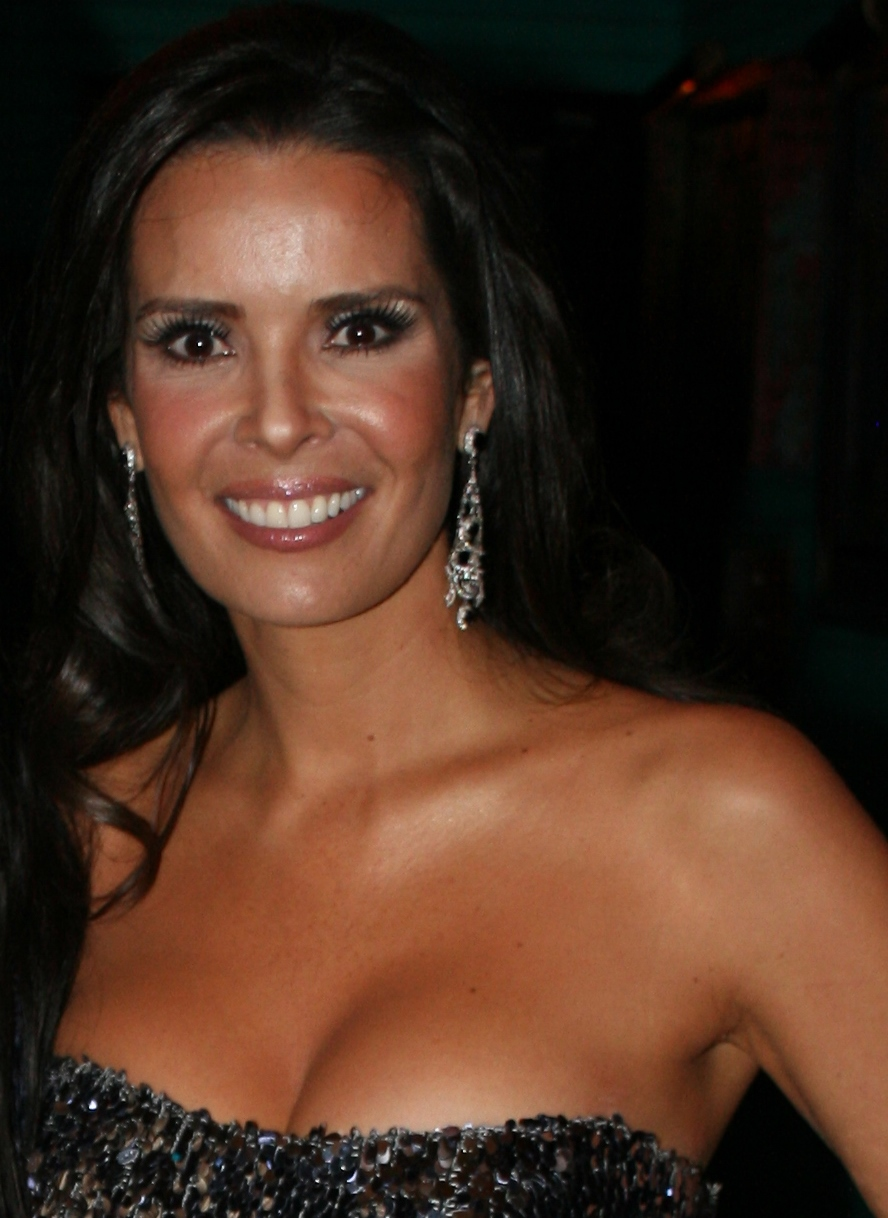
Karent Sierra

Main cast members
Cast member	Seasons							
Cast member	1	2	3	4	5	6	7	8
Lea Black	Main	Main	Main		Guest			
Adriana de Moura	Main	Main	Main	Friend	Friend	Friend	Friend	Friend
Alexia Nepola	Main	Friend	Main	Main	Main	Main	Main	Main
Marysol Patton	Main	Main	Friend	Friend	Friend	Friend	Friend	Friend
Larsa Pippen	Main			Main	Main	Main	Main	Main
Cristy Rice	Main							
Lisa Hochstein		Main	Main	Main	Main	Main	Main	Main
Joanna Krupa		Main	Main					
Ana Quincoces	Guest	Main	Friend			Guest		
Karent Sierra		Main	Guest					
Guerdy Abraira				Main	Main	Main	Main	Main
Julia Lemigova				Main	Main	Main	Main	Main
Nicole Martin				Main	Main	Main	Guest	
Stephanie Shojaee							Main	Main
								Main
Friends of the housewives
Kiki Barth				Friend	Friend	Friend	Friend	Friend

== Episodes ==
The Real Housewives of Miami episodes
Season	Episodes	Originally released			Average Viewers
Season	Episodes	First released	Last released	Network	Average Viewers
1	7	February 22, 2011	April 5, 2011	Bravo	1.09
2	18	September 13, 2012	January 8, 2013	Bravo	1.07
3	16	August 12, 2013	November 14, 2013	Bravo	1.02
4	14	December 16, 2021	March 10, 2022	Peacock	0.28
5	19	December 8, 2022	March 23, 2023	Peacock	0.25
6	20	November 1, 2023	March 7, 2024	Bravo	0.42
7	20	June 11, 2025	October 16, 2025	Bravo	0.29

== Havana Elsa ==
While season two of The Real Housewives of Miami was airing, Bravo released a web series titled Havana Elsa. The series featured Elsa Patton, the mother of full-time cast member, Marysol Patton, embarking on launching her own coffee line, also titled Havana Elsa. The web series aired a total of 9 episodes.

== Reception ==
=== Ratings ===
The Real Housewives of Miami : U.S. viewers per episode (millions)

Season	Episode number																				Average
Season	1	2	3	4	5	6	7	8	9	10	11	12	13	14	15	16	17	18	19	20	Average
1	1.21	1.03	1.30	1.10	1.19	1.09	0.72	–													1.09
2	1.06	1.02	0.96	0.84	0.87	0.76	0.85	1.35	1.09	1.63	1.13	1.02	0.95	1.12	1.25	1.21	1.28	0.93	–		1.07
3	1.35	1.39	1.32	1.01	1.01	1.06	0.81	0.65	0.80	0.86	0.83	0.76	1.37	0.95	1.07	1.00	–				1.02
4	0.37	0.31	0.34	0.32	0.24	0.24	0.25	0.24	0.29	0.27	0.25	0.34	0.20	0.30	–						0.28
5	0.26	0.24	0.22	0.28	0.28	0.29	0.29	0.21	0.26	0.28	0.28	0.25	0.29	0.26	0.22	0.24	0.25	0.23	0.26	–	0.26
6	0.38	0.43	0.46	0.31	0.41	0.42	0.44	0.35	0.34	0.52	0.46	0.49	0.50	0.44	0.46	0.40	0.47	0.47	0.31	0.33	0.42
7	0.29	0.31	0.28	0.28	0.29	0.28	0.28	0.27	0.26	0.29	0.27	0.32	0.30	0.30	0.29	0.27	0.26	0.31	0.31	0.29	0.29

Audience measurement performed by Nielsen Media Research
