= Joanna Krupa =

Polish-born American model and actress

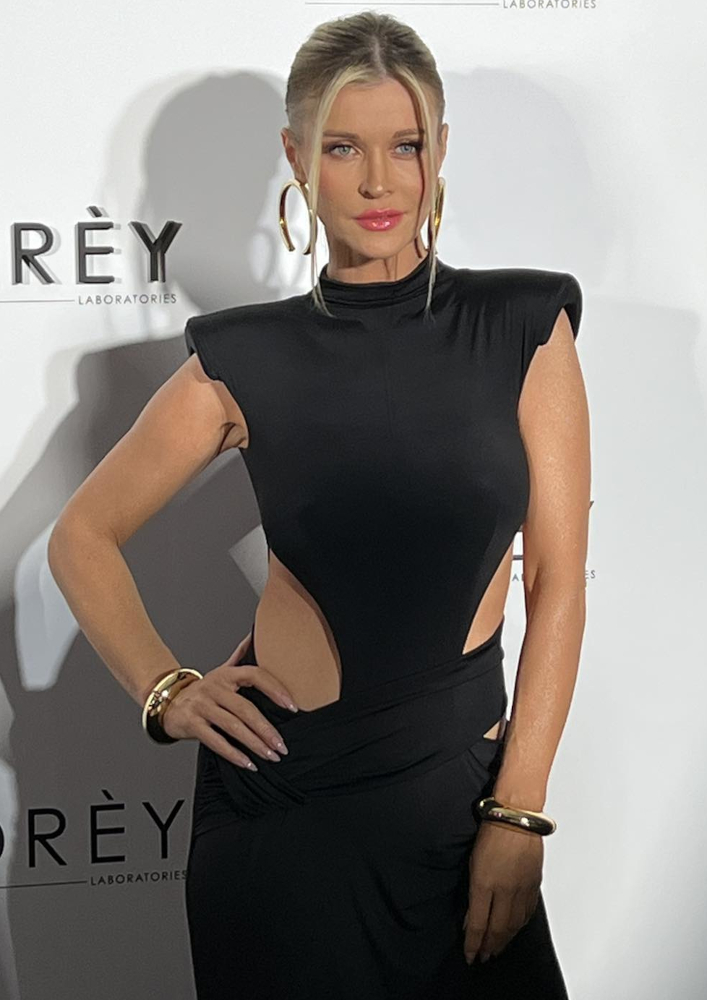
- Krupa in 2025
- Born: April 23, 1979 (age 47); Warsaw, Poland
- Occupations: Actress; model; television presenter; activist
- Years active: 1994–present
- Spouses: Romain Zago (m. 2013; div. 2017) Douglas Nunes (m. 2018; div. 2023)
- Children: 1
- Modeling information
- Height: 5 ft 7 in (1.70 m)
- Hair color: Blonde
- Eye color: Blue
- Agency: Avant Management

Joanna Krupa (born April 23, 1979) is a Polish-born American model, actress, and television presenter. She is the host and head judge of Polish Top Model (2010–present) and has appeared on the US reality television series Dancing with the Stars (2009) and The Real Housewives of Miami (2012–2013).

== Early life ==
Krupa was born in Warsaw to father Zbigniew and mother Jolanta. Her father is an electrical engineer and her mother, who is originally from Tarnów, worked as a nurse in Poland. She has a younger sister, Marta, who is also a model. At the age of five, she and her family moved to the United States, settling in Lombard, Illinois. She trained in ballet until the age of nine, and at the age of 13, her mother enrolled her in a modeling school. She graduated from Glenbard East High School in 1997.

== Career ==
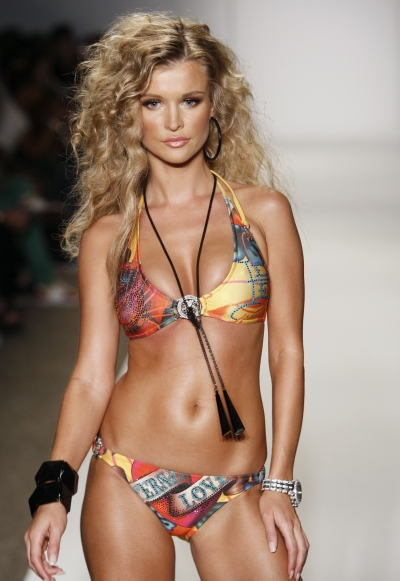
Krupa modeling for Ed Hardy in 2008

At the age of 20, Krupa moved to Los Angeles to pursue modeling, also working as a secretary to support herself. She was initially rejected by modeling agencies for her height and weight, however, her breakthrough came when she appeared on the cover of Maxim in the Netherlands. In addition to Maxim, she appeared on covers for Playboy, FHM, Ocean Drive. Inside Sport, Stuff, and Steppin' Out. She also made appearances in the film Max Havoc: Curse of the Dragon and the television series Las Vegas and CSI: Crime Scene Investigation.

In June 2009, she participated in The Superstars, partnering with Terrell Owens. Two months later, she was featured on the cover of Maxim and was announced as a contestant on the ninth season of Dancing with the Stars, partnering Derek Hough. They came in fourth place. She began hosting Top Model, the Polish spin-off of the reality television series America's Next Top Model, in 2010. In 2012, she joined the cast of The Real Housewives of Miami in its second season. That year, she also co-hosted After Party, a Dancing with the Stars post-show web series. She was included on the Maxim Hot 100 in 2014.

In March 2017, she starred in the film You Can't Have It alongside Rob Gronkowski. Later that year, she published a book titled Psie sprawki, was a contestant on Battle of the Network Stars, and was featured on the cover of Viva! in Poland. She hosted an episode of SNL Polska, the Polish version of Saturday Night Live, in 2018.

== Activism ==
Krupa advocates for animal rights, and has appeared in several campaigns for animal rights organization People for the Ethical Treatment of Animals (PETA). On December 2, 2009, PETA released a campaign for dog adoption which featured Krupa as an angel holding a crucifix to cover her breasts and genitalia. The campaign drew criticism from the Catholic League and the Anti-Defamation League, who deemed it offensive.

In 2012, she organized a protest outside Dash, a Los Angeles boutique owned by the Kardashian sisters, after Khloé Kardashian renounced her support of PETA.

In 2015, she posed in body paint for PETA's campaign to boycott SeaWorld.

In 2013, she co-founded an animal rescue group, Angels For Animal Rescue. She has also promoted several animal shelters in her native Poland.

== Personal life ==
Krupa was raised Roman Catholic. After several years of dating, she became engaged to nightclub owner and businessman Romain Zago in 2010. They married on June 13, 2013, in Aviara, Carlsbad, California, US. On July 10, 2017, she filed for divorce. The divorce was finalized several weeks later on August 17. On March 25, 2018, she announced her engagement to Douglas Nunes via Instagram. They married on August 4, 2018, in a private ceremony at the Benedictine Abbey in Tyniec, Poland. Their daughter was born in November 2019. In March 2023, Nunes filed for divorce. The divorce was finalized in October 2023.

== Dancing with the Stars results ==
Week #	Dance	Song	Judges' score			Result
Week #	Dance	Song	Inaba	Goodman	Tonioli	Result
1	Salsa	"Meddle"	8	8	8	Safe
1	Foxtrot	"The Best Is Yet to Come"	Awarded 10 points			Added to Week 1 score
2	Jive	"What I Like About You"	6	7^{*}	7	Safe
3	Samba	"La Bomba"	7	8	8	Safe
4	Lambada	"Dançando Lambada"	9	8	9	Safe
5	Argentine Tango	"Whatever Lola Wants"^{**}	8	8	8	Safe
6	Waltz	"Be Here To Love Me"	8	9	9	Safe
6	Mambo	"Ran Kan Kan"	Awarded 10 points			Added to Week 6 score
7	Rumba	"The Look of Love"	9	9	9	Safe
7	Tango	"You Give Love a Bad Name"	9	9	10	Added to Week 7 score
8	Quickstep	"Valerie"	8	7	8	Safe
8	Paso Doble	"Living on Video"	9	10	10	Safe
9	Viennese Waltz	"Hallelujah"	9	9	9	Eliminated
9	Cha-Cha-Cha	"Can't Get You Out of My Head	9	9	9	Eliminated
9	Salsa	"La Luz del Ritmo"	9	9	9	Eliminated

^*Due to Len Goodman's absence in week 2, the 7 was awarded by stand-in guest judge Baz Luhrmann.
^**Due to illness, Derek Hough was unable to perform; Joanna Krupa performed this dance with Maksim Chmerkovskiy.

== Filmography ==
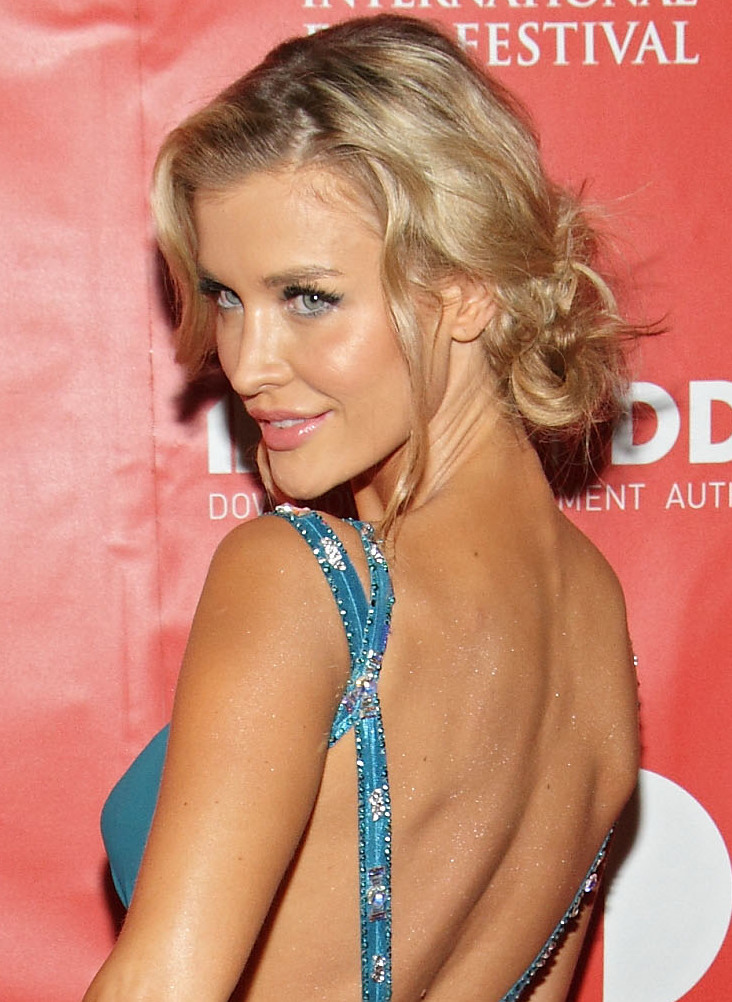
Krupa at the Miami Film Festival in 2012

=== Film ===
Year	Title	Role	Ref.
1999	The Underground Comedy Movie	Beautiful Girl	
2001	Planet of the Apes	Friend at Leo's party	
2004	Max Havoc: Curse of the Dragon	Jane Goody	
2006	The Dog Problem	Taffy	
2007	Ripple Effect	Vicky	
2010	Six Days in Paradise	Ginger	
2013	Inappropriate Comedy	Beautiful Girl #2	
2016	Another Day in Paradise	Stacy	
2017	You Can't Have It	Jackie	

=== Television ===
Year	Title	Role	Notes	Ref.
2000–2001	Son of the Beach	Hot Girl	2 episodes	
2002–2003	The Man Show	Juggy Dancer	17 episodes	
2003	Star Search	Herself	Contestant	
2004	Las Vegas	Nicole	Episode: "Degas Away with It"	
2006	CSI: Crime Scene Investigation	Waitress	Episode: "Kiss Kiss, Bye Bye"	
2007	Work Out	Herself	Episode: "Unhealthy Truths"	
2009	The Superstars	Herself	Contestant	
2009	Dancing with the Stars	Herself	Contestant (season 9)	
2010	Ultimate Women Challenge	Herself	Host	
2010–present	Top Model	Herself	Host and judge	
2012	Wedding Band	Beth	Episode: "Time of My Life"	
2012–2013	The Real Housewives of Miami	Herself	Main cast member (seasons 2–3)	
2017	In the Blink of an Eye	Katie	Television film	
2017	Hollywood Medium with Tyler Henry	Herself	1 episode	
2017	Battle of the Network Stars	Herself	Contestant; 1 episode	
2018	SNL Polska	Herself	Host; 1 episode	
