= Miami Social =

2009 American reality TV series

- Katrina, Ariel, Maria, and George (top row, from left); Hardy, Sorah, and Michael (bottom row, from left)
- Genre: Reality
- Country of origin: United States
- Original language: English
- No. of seasons: 1
- No. of episodes: 7

Production
- Executive producers: John Ehrhard; Kimberly Cowin
- Production locations: South Beach; Miami, Florida
- Running time: 42 minutes
- Production company: Pink Sneakers Productions

Original release
- Network: Bravo
- Release: July 14 – August 18, 2009

Related
- The Real Housewives of Miami

Miami Social is an American reality television television series on Bravo that debuted on July 14, 2009. The series chronicled the lives of seven friends in South Beach, Miami.

== Cast ==
- Sorah Daiha
- Michael Cohen
- Maria Lankina
- Katrina Campins
- Hardy Hill
- George French
- Ariel Stein

== Episodes ==
No.	Title	Original release date
1	"Liar, Liar"	July 14, 2009
George's girlfriend, Lina, goes off on a business trip but lies to George about the location and reason for the trip; George turns to his ex-wife Sorah for advice and solace. Katrina and her husband Ben decide to separate, news that shocks the group. Meanwhile, Ariel works on an important fashion event.
2	"Single in Sobe"	July 21, 2009
Maria is in tears as she says goodbye to 13-year-old Angelika, who is heading to boarding school in Switzerland. After six years of dating, Hardy's girlfriend Trixia gets impatient at Hardy's reluctance to propose. Katrina attempts to maintain her friendship with her husband and business partner Ben after they separate. Michael plans a large birthday party and vacillates over whether to invite Ariel. George and Lina's relationship continues to show signs of stress, culminating with George showing up to Michael's party with another woman.
3	"The Better Lover"	July 28, 2009
George asks an uncomfortable Sorah about the intimate details of her relationship with Gonzalo over a one-on-one dinner. Katrina juggles the competing desires of two clients as she attempts to sell several muti-million dollar homes. Ariel checks on a desk he is having custom built, and Hardy and Katrina later try to have an intervention with Ariel about his arrogant personality. Michael later offends Lina while teasing her about the girl George brought to his party in place of her. George proceeds to gets drunk at an open house that Katrina threw, while Lina was at home giving herself a pregnancy test.
4	"False Positives"	August 4, 2009
Lina announces to George that she is pregnant, but George soon gets word from a friend that her story is contrived. Ariel tries unsuccessfully to bring Maria in as a photographer on his latest project. Michael and Maria are excited at the prospects of 20/20 vision as they undertake Lasik eye surgery. Katrina tells her (separated) husband Ben that she's moving to a new home on the beach, but he appears nonplussed.
5	"All About Me"	August 11, 2009
Michael and Maria take Katrina out on the town for the first time since her separation, but Katrina is reluctant to live a single life. Sorah tells George that he will have to move out of his apartment (which is in her name) after talking things over with her boyfriend, Gonzalo. Michael dates Diego, a friend of Gonzalo and Sorah, but has second thoughts after looking up Diego's Facebook account. Hardy and Trixia throw a charity event, and Ariel hosts a fashion show for his new clothing line; both events are sparsely attended by the hosts' friends.
6	"It's Over"	August 18, 2009
Each of the cast members does something to better themselves in this episode. Perhaps the least profound is Ariel, who stands up for the auditioning models while doing a casting session for a Los Angeles-based designer. Michael takes the anticipated step of getting hair plugs. As Katrina finalizes her divorce papers, Maria, three years out from her own divorce, goes on her first date in a long time. And while Hardy and Trixia celebrate their sixth anniversary, George finally breaks up with Lina after a visit from his mother. After the breakup, George tries to turn to Sorah for support, only to find that she has pulled away from their friendship for the sake of her relationship with Gonzalo.
7	"Reunion"	August 25, 2009

== Ratings ==
Miami Social attracted few viewers, received low ratings, and garnered negative press coverage. The network attempted to revitalize the show with a second season where the show would be recompiled into another series called Miami Social Club, but by February 2011 the network decided to instead use the Miami Social Club idea in The Real Housewives franchise. The filmed footage premiered as The Real Housewives of Miami on February 22, 2011.
