= The Real Housewives of Miami season 3 =

Season of television series

The Real Housewives of Miami
- Season 3
- Cover used by iTunes (Left to right) Krupa, Hochstein, Black, De Moura and Echevarria
- Starring: Lea Black; Adriana de Moura; Alexia Echevarria; Lisa Hochstein; Joanna Krupa
- No. of episodes: 16

Release
- Original network: Bravo
- Original release: August 12 – November 14, 2013

Season chronology
- ← Previous; Season 2 Next → Season 4

The third season of The Real Housewives of Miami, an American reality television series, was broadcast on Bravo. It aired from August 12, 2013, until November 14, 2013, and was primarily filmed in Miami, Florida. Its executive producers are Matt Anderson, Nate Green and Andy Cohen.

The Real Housewives of Miami focuses on the lives of Lea Black, Adriana De Moura, Alexia Echevarria, Lisa Hochstein and Joanna Krupa. It consisted of sixteen episodes.

This season marked the final regular appearances of Lea Black and Adriana de Moura. It also marked the final appearance of Joanna Krupa.

== Production and crew ==
A third season was confirmed when controversy arose when the production company, Purveyors of Pop, proposed using drones to film B-roll aerial shots. Season 3 was officially announced the renewal of The Real Housewives of Miami on April 2, 2013. The cast and the premiere date were officially revealed on June 24, 2013. The reunion for the third season was filmed in New York City on October 17, 2013, and later aired in two-parts.

The season premiered with "Til Lies Do Us Part" on August 12, 2013, while the fourteenth episode "Mrs. Zago" served as the season finale, and was aired on November 4, 2013. It was followed by a two-part reunion special that aired on November 11, and November 14, 2013, which marked the conclusion of the season. Matt Anderson, Nate Green and Andy Cohen are recognized as the series' executive producers; it is produced and distributed by Purveyors of Pop.

The third season is the last season of The Real Housewives of Miami to air and has not been on air until 2021. In an article published by Bravo's The Daily Dish on September 29, 2016, it stated that The Real Housewives of Miami had "ended".

== Cast and synopsis ==
Four of the seven housewives featured on the second season of The Real Housewives of Miami returned for the third installment. Karent Sierra, who joined during the second season, was let go from the series due to being bicoastal, filming The Doctors in L.A., as well as casting for some films. Marysol Patton and Ana Quincoces, who respectively joined the series during the first and second seasons, were both reduced to a recurring role. Original cast member Alexia Echevarria returned to the series in full capacity after being reduced to a recurring in season 2. Throughout the season, rival cast members, Joanna Krupa and Adriana De Moura's feud was at an all-time high as they were planning for their wedding.

== Episodes ==
The Real Housewives of Miami season 3 episodes
No. overall	No. in season	Title	Original release date	U.S. viewers (millions)
26	1	"Til Lies Do Us Part"	August 12, 2013	1.35
In the Season 3 premiere, Adriana and Lea try to make sense of things in the wake of Adriana's marriage certificate surfacing in the media. Lisa's plans to invite the ladies to her home for a get together fall through after surprising information is revealed.
27	2	"Hurricane Adriana"	August 19, 2013	1.39
Lea and Adriana's argument reaches its peak. Romain asks Joanna a question that could put the wedding on hold. Lisa's Star Island home faces some issues with preservationists.
28	3	"Booby-Trapped"	August 26, 2013	1.32
The fallout from Adriana and Lea's feud leaves the ladies divided. Lisa tries to reunite the warring women, only to have Joanna and Lea expose a web of deceit surrounding Adriana's marriage mayhem. Later, Alexia chooses to reveal to the ladies a secret from her past.
29	4	"Black Magic"	September 2, 2013	1.01
Joanna and Romain start couples therapy but Romain doesn't show up. Lea reveals some news to Lisa. Marysol visits a psychic for a tarot card reading. Frederic and Romain get into a heated argument.
30	5	"A Cause for Concern"	September 9, 2013	1.01
It's the time of the year for the Black's annual gala, Lea begins preparations for the event while juggling socializing with the ladies. With all the drama going on in the group, Alexia is forced to choose a side. Lisa has a difficult time coping with the fact that she and Lenny need a surrogate.
31	6	"A Ple-Thora of Lies"	September 16, 2013	1.06
Adriana and Lea still can't resolve their issues. Lisa receives another visit from Lenny's parents. The housewives come together at Lea's home for a birthday party.
32	7	"La La Land"	September 23, 2013	0.81
Alexia's ex-husband has another run in with the law. Joanna and Adriana continue to plan their weddings when Adrianna has a major setback.
33	8	"Mama Elsa Comes Home"	September 30, 2013	0.65
Adrianna and Joanna come together in an attempt to put their differences side and become friends. Mama Elsa returns home from the hospital. Romain and Joanna attend another sex therapy appointment. Alexia and Peter try to work out their problems.
34	9	"Birkin Buddies"	October 7, 2013	0.80
With Adriana demanding over the top items for her wedding, Alexia and Marysol work on preventing Adriana from destroying her own wedding. Joanna and Romain discover more faults in their relationship. Lisa swoops in to defend some allegations against Lea.
35	10	"Brazilian Bridezilla"	October 14, 2013	0.86
Adriana finally wed Fredric in the eyes of the church, and forces her guests to wait for her and her "bridezilla" antics.
36	11	"The Black Sheep"	October 21, 2013	0.83
It's the time of the year for Lea and RJ to make their annual trip back home to Texas. Lea decides to invite Lisa on the trip. Alexia and Herman celebrate their anniversary. Alexia begins to reflect on the past 10 years of her life and the changes that have been brought to her. With all the celebration going on around her, Marysol can't seem to stay happy due to Mama Elsa's declining health. Joanna and Romain are surprised when Romain's parents make an unexpected announcement.
37	12	"Bridesmaid Breakdown"	October 28, 2013	0.76
Lisa is determined to bring Lea and Adriana's friendship back to the way it was. With the stress of her upcoming wedding, Joanna snaps at Lisa which leaves Lisa questioning their friendship. Adriana and Lea come head-to-head at Lea's ballroom reveal party.
38	13	"Blame It on the Alcohol"	November 3, 2013	1.37
The housewives fly to Las Vegas for Joanna's bachlorette party. Adriana tries to fix her friendship with Lea. Adriana and Joanna begin to bond.
39	14	"Mrs. Zago"	November 4, 2013	0.95
Joanna and Romain's wedding has finally arrived. Alexia and Lisa receive some promising news. Adriana starts to see a brighter side of Lea.
40	15	"Reunion – Part 1"	November 11, 2013	1.07
The ladies of Miami reunite to set the record straight on some of the most talked about antics of the season.
41	16	"Reunion – Part 2"	November 14, 2013	1.00
Lisa is on the attack, after Joanna makes accusations about her. Special guest, Marysol Patton, makes an appearance and gets to the bottom of her feud with Lea.
