= Julia Lemigova =

Russian model (born 1972)

- Born: Yulia Andreevna Lemigova; 26 June 1972 (age 54); Moscow, Russian SFSR, Soviet Union (now Russia)
- Occupation: Former fashion model
- Spouse: Martina Navratilova (m. 2014)
- Children: 5
- Beauty pageant titleholder
- Title: Miss USSR 1990
- Major competitions: Miss USSR 1990 (Winner); Miss Universe 1991 (2nd Runner-up)

Yulia Andreevna "Julia" Lemigova (Russian: Юлия Андреевна Лемигова; born 26 June 1972) is a Russian former model and beauty pageant titleholder who was crowned Miss USSR 1990 and is married to Martina Navratilova. She was a cast member of the Bravo reality television series The Real Housewives of Miami.

== Career ==
Julia Lemigova is the daughter of a Red Army colonel.

Lemigova was first runner-up at Miss USSR in 1990, elevated to be crowned Miss USSR following the disqualification of the original winner, Maria Kezha, for being underage.

As Miss USSR 1990, Lemigova represented the Soviet Union at the Miss Universe 1991 pageant, where she placed 2nd runner-up.

Lemigova moved to Western Europe after being crowned Miss USSR, eventually basing herself in Paris, where she opened her first well-being center, Joiya spa, in 2003, and launched a skincare and spa line, Russie Blanche, in 2009.

In 2021, Lemigova was announced as a cast member on season 4 of The Real Housewives of Miami, making her the first cast member in the history of the Real Housewives franchise to be married to a woman; Lemigova's wife is tennis player Martina Navratilova. Lemigova is the third former Miss Universe finalist to join a Real Housewives franchise after Kenya Moore (Miss USA 1993, Miss Universe 1993 Top 6 Finalist) from Atlanta (seasons 5–10, 12–16) and Joyce Giraud (Miss Universe Puerto Rico 1998, Miss Universe 1998 2nd Runner-up) from Beverly Hills (season 4).

In December 2023, Lemigova was scheduled to perform at the Wilton Manors Holiday Spectacular before being uninvited by the Wilton Manors Business Association (WMBA) due to her wife Martina Navratilova's views on transgender topics.

== Personal life ==
In 1997, Lemigova became romantically linked to banker Édouard Stern, with whom she had a son, Maximilian, who died of shaken baby syndrome while in the care of a new nanny. She has two daughters. Lemigova married her long-term partner former professional tennis player Martina Navratilova in New York on 15 December 2014.

In August 2024, Lemigova and her wife adopted two boys.
