= Lisa Hochstein =

Canadian-American television personality (born 1982)

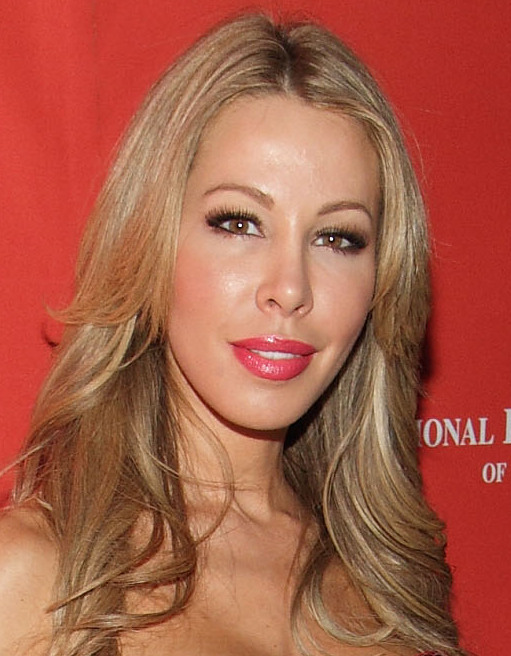
- Hochstein at the 2012 Miami Film Festival
- Born: Lisa Marie MacCallum; July 24, 1982 (age 43); Toronto, Ontario, Canada
- Occupations: Television personality; entrepreneur; socialite
- Spouse: Leonard Hochstein (m. 2009; div. 2024)
- Children: 2

Lisa Marie Hochstein (née MacCallum; born July 24, 1982) is a Canadian-American television personality and entrepreneur. She is best known for appearing as a main cast member on the reality television series, The Real Housewives of Miami, appearing in that capacity since the show's second season.

== Life and career ==
Hochstein was born in Toronto, Canada to parents Roger & Jean (Wedemire) MacCallum. She has a younger brother named Phillip.

In her early twenties, Lisa embarked on a career as a model and actress, initially participating in beauty pageants like Miss Swimsuit Canada, a title she won in 2002. She soon set her focus primarily on modeling, adopting the stage name "Lisa MacKay." In 2006, she made her debut appearance in Playboy, a decision she later came to regret.

Lisa met her husband, Dr. Leonard "Lenny" Hochstein, in 2007, while he was visiting Las Vegas. Shortly after meeting, she decided to relocate to Miami, and just six months later, the couple was engaged. They were wed in the backyard of their Sunset Island home exactly two years after they met.

Hochstein's career moved to reality television, when she made her debut on the second season of The Real Housewives of Miami in 2012. Early on, the show focused on the challenges that Lisa and Lenny faced while trying to conceive a child. The couple's fertility struggles resulted in three miscarriages and four unsuccessful IVF attempts. Eventually, they decided to pursue surrogacy, and in July 2015, they became parents to their first child, Logan Marc. Four years later, they welcomed their second child, Elle Marie.

The Hochsteins were noted residents of the exclusive Star Island neighborhood for over 10 years. The couple purchased the then historic 1920s estate in 2012, with plans to immediately demolish the house and construct a 20,000 square foot mansion in its place. Their plans sparked strong resistance from the Miami Design Preservation League, attempting to save the iconic Walter De Garmo home. However, despite the opposition, Lisa and Lenny ultimately succeeded in their battle against the preservationists, completing construction of their palatial home in 2016.

As a result of the former couple's very public and contentious divorce, Lisa decided to launch a divorce services company called Splitwell in 2023.

In November 2023, Lisa moved out of her and Lenny's marital property and into a 5,000 square foot condominium nearby.

== Legal issues ==
In April 2026, Hochstein was charged with one count of interception of wire, oral, or electronic communications in Miami-Dade County. The charge stemmed from allegations that she and her then-boyfriend, Jody Glidden, installed a hidden recording device in the vehicle of her ex-husband, Leonard Hochstein, during their divorce proceedings in 2023. According to an arrest warrant, the device allegedly recorded private conversations related to family matters, finances, and business activities without consent.

Authorities reported that forensic analysis recovered both active and deleted recordings from the device, including audio purportedly capturing the installation of the recorder. Investigators also alleged that Glidden had purchased similar recording devices prior to the incident.

Hochstein and Glidden were both arrested in April 2026 and later released on bond. Both have pleaded not guilty, and Hochstein's attorney stated that the matter is related to a contentious divorce and should be handled as a civil issue rather than a criminal case.

== See also ==
- The Real Housewives
- The Real Housewives of Miami
