= List of Live with Kelly and Michael episodes =

Live with Kelly and Michael was the 2012–2016 title of a long-running American syndicated morning talk show. Kelly Ripa and Michael Strahan were the hosts in that period.

== Season 25 (2012–13) ==
=== September 2012 ===
Date	Co-Hosts	"Host Chat"	Guests/Segments	"Kelly and Michael's Inbox"
September 4	Kelly Ripa & Michael Strahan	Yes	Claire Danes, Phillip Phillips, Challenge with the Champions – Jordyn Wieber & Aly Raisman	No
September 5	Kelly Ripa & Michael Strahan	Yes	Meredith Vieira, Demi Lovato, Challenge with the Champions – Amar'e Stoudemire	No
September 6	Kelly Ripa & Michael Strahan	Yes	Katie Couric, James Marsden, Challenge with the Champions – Carli Lloyd & Alex Morgan	No
September 7	Kelly Ripa & Michael Strahan	Yes	Melissa Etheridge, Kristin Chenoweth, Challenge with the Champions – Ryan Lochte	No
September 10	Kelly Ripa & Michael Strahan	Yes	Blake Shelton, Josh Radnor, Serena Williams, LIVE's Cutest Kid Search Week	Yes
September 11	Kelly Ripa & Michael Strahan	Yes	Matthew Perry, Olivia Wilde, Andy Murray, LIVE's Cutest Kid Search Week	Yes
September 12	Kelly Ripa & Michael Strahan	Yes	Jeremy Irons, Owl City, LIVE's Cutest Kid Search Week	Yes
September 13	Kelly Ripa & Michael Strahan	Yes	Emma Watson, LIVE's Cutest Kid Search Week	Yes
September 14	Kelly Ripa & Michael Strahan	Yes	Tyra Banks, Theresa Caputo, Obie the Dachshund, LIVE's Cutest Kid Search Week	Yes
September 17	Kelly Ripa & Michael Strahan	Yes	Lucy Liu, Penny Marshall, Nelly Furtado	No
September 18	Kelly Ripa & Michael Strahan	Yes	Kelsey Grammer, Mitt & Ann Romney	Yes
September 19	Kelly Ripa & Michael Strahan	Yes	Maya Rudolph, Elizabeth Olsen, Neon Trees	Yes
September 20	Kelly Ripa & Michael Strahan	Yes	Jake Gyllenhaal, Archie Panjabi, Austin Mahone	No
September 21	Kelly Ripa & Michael Strahan	Yes	Michael Chiklis, America Ferrera, Richie Sambora	Yes
September 24	Kelly Ripa & Michael Strahan	Yes	Maggie Gyllenhaal, Billy Gardell, Lawrence Zarian, Bow Wow Week	Yes
September 25	Kelly Ripa & Michael Strahan	Yes	Jimmy Fallon, NeNe Leakes, Bow Wow Week	No
September 26	Kelly Ripa & Michael Strahan	Yes	Ty Burrell, Terry O'Quinn, Bow Wow Week	No
September 27	Kelly Ripa & Michael Strahan	Yes	Sara Ramirez, Lana Parrilla, Bow Wow Week	No
September 28	Kelly Ripa & Michael Strahan	Yes	Julianna Margulies, Emily VanCamp, Bow Wow Week	No

=== October 2012 ===
Date	Co-Hosts	"Host Chat"	Guests/Segments	"Kelly and Michael's Inbox"
October 1	Kelly Ripa & Michael Strahan	Yes	Liam Neeson, Rachel Bilson, Diana Krall	Yes
October 2	Kelly Ripa & Michael Strahan	Yes	Tom Selleck, Mamie Gummer, Heart, Kelly's Birthday Surprise	No
October 3	Kelly Ripa & Michael Strahan	Yes	Stephen Colbert, Leighton Meester, Cher Lloyd, Behind the Scenes of Kelly's Birthday Surprise	Yes
October 4	Kelly Ripa & Michael Strahan	Yes	Samantha Giancola, Deena Cortese, Jenny Farley, Louise Strahan	No
October 5	Kelly Ripa & Michael Strahan	Yes	Chace Crawford, Mindy Kaling, Kelly visits David Blaine	No
October 8	Kelly Ripa & Michael Strahan	Yes	Ben Affleck, John Cena	No
October 9	Kelly Ripa & Michael Strahan	Yes	Christopher Walken, Connie Britton, Rick Springfield	No
October 10	Kelly Ripa & Michael Strahan	Yes	Kevin James, Kristin Kreuk, The Script	No
October 11	Kelly Ripa & Michael Strahan	Yes	Bryan Cranston, Stanley Tucci	Yes
October 12	Kelly Ripa & Michael Strahan	Yes	Salma Hayek Pinault, FamilyFun Toys of the Year	No
October 15	Kelly Ripa & Michael Strahan	Yes	Cynthia Nixon, Max Greenfield	Yes
October 16	Kelly Ripa & Michael Strahan	Yes	Ben Stiller, Gavin DeGraw, World's Largest Pumpkin	No
October 17	Kelly Ripa & Michael Strahan	Yes	Kaley Cuoco, Jason Aldean, Wife Carrying Champions Taisto Miettinen & Kristiina Haapenan	No
October 18	Kelly Ripa & Michael Strahan	Yes	Shaquille O'Neal, Isaac Mizrahi	No
October 19	Kelly Ripa & Michael Strahan	Yes	Michelle Obama, Brandy	Yes
October 22	Kelly Ripa & Michael Strahan	Yes	Elisha Cuthbert, Victoria Justice, Science Bob	Yes
October 23	Kelly Ripa & Michael Strahan	Yes	Gerard Butler, Krysten Ritter, Animals from San Diego Zoo	No
October 24	Kelly Ripa & Michael Strahan	Yes	Ted Danson, Jack McBrayer, Little Big Town	No
October 25	Kelly Ripa & Michael Strahan	Yes	Usher, Nicole "Snooki" Polizzi, Cher Lloyd	No
October 26	Kelly Ripa & Michael Strahan	Yes	Ellen Barkin, Adam Levine	Yes
October 29	Kelly Ripa & Michael Strahan	Yes	Don Cheadle, Jimmy Kimmel, Kids of LIVE Halloween Fashion Show	No
October 31	Kelly Ripa & Michael Strahan	Yes	Diane Sawyer, Caroline Rhea	No

=== November 2012 ===
Date	Co-Hosts	"Host Chat"	Guests/Segments	"Kelly and Michael's Inbox"
November 1	Kelly Ripa & Michael Strahan	Yes	Gary Sinise, Jennifer Carpenter	Yes
November 2	Kelly Ripa & Michael Strahan	Yes	Sarah Silverman, Judi Dench	Yes
November 5	Kelly Ripa & Michael Strahan	Yes	LIVE's Halloween Hurricane Telethon: Pauly D, Winner of LIVE's Annual Halloween Costume Contest	No
November 6	Kelly Ripa & Michael Strahan	Yes	Andre Braugher, Andy Grammer, Let's Get Physical Week – Gabby Douglas	No
November 7	Kelly Ripa & Michael Strahan	Yes	Kristen Stewart, Josh Peck, Let's Get Physical Week – Alicia Graf Mack	No
November 8	Kelly Ripa & Michael Strahan	Yes	Robert Pattinson, Let's Get Physical Week – Bellydance Superstars	No
November 9	Kelly Ripa & Michael Strahan	Yes	Taylor Lautner, Let's Get Physical Week – Brooklyn Nets Kids	No
November 12	Kelly Ripa & Michael Strahan	Yes	Robert De Niro, Isla Fisher, Connor Cruise, LIVE's Thanksgiving Family Recipe Week – Kelly	Yes
November 13	Kelly Ripa & Michael Strahan	Yes	Bradley Cooper, Jason Cameron, LIVE's Thanksgiving Family Recipe Week – Nicole Murphy	No
November 14	Kelly Ripa & Michael Strahan	Yes	Hayden Panettiere, Kellan Lutz, Behind the Scenes of Michael's Photo Shoot, LIVE's Thanksgiving Family Recipe Week – Michael	No
November 15	Kelly Ripa & Michael Strahan	Yes	Chris Tucker, Ashley Greene, Bridgit Mendler, LIVE's Thanksgiving Family Recipe Week – Gelman	No
November 16	Kelly Ripa & Michael Strahan	Yes	Zooey Deschanel, Jason Cameron & Tony Siragusa, LIVE's Thanksgiving Family Recipe Week – Camilla Consuelos	No
November 19	Kelly Ripa & Michael Strahan	Yes	Katie Holmes, Dave Salmoni, Healthy Holiday Eating – Dr. Wendy Bazillian	No
November 20	Kelly Ripa & Michael Strahan	Yes	Amy Poehler, Rico Rodriguez, Elaine Kramer	Yes
November 21	Kelly Ripa & Michael Strahan	Yes	Alec Baldwin, Nicki Minaj, Michael's Birthday Surprise	Yes
November 23	Kelly Ripa & Michael Strahan	Yes	Helen Mirren, Miranda Cosgrove, Animals from Mutual of Omaha's Wild Kingdom	No
November 26	Kelly Ripa & Michael Strahan	Yes	Jack Black, Carrot Top, LIVE's Holiday Gift Guide – Lori Bergamotto	No
November 27	Kelly Ripa & Michael Strahan	Yes	Helen Hunt, Bryan Adams, LIVE's Holiday Gift Guide – Carley Roney	No
November 28	Kelly Ripa & Michael Strahan	Yes	Dolly Parton, Kevin McKidd, LIVE's Holiday Gift Guide – Chris Byrne	No
November 29	Kelly Ripa & Michael Strahan	Yes	Patricia Heaton, Scott Speedman, LIVE's Holiday Gift Guide – Clint Carter	No
November 30	Kelly Ripa & Michael Strahan	Yes	Tracy Morgan, Rod Stewart, LIVE's Holiday Gift Guide – David Pogue	Yes

=== December 2012 ===
Date	Co-Hosts	"Host Chat"	Guests/Segments	"Kelly and Michael's Inbox"
December 3	Kelly Ripa & Michael Strahan	Yes	Neil Patrick Harris, Sir Ian McKellen, Holidays in New York Week – Jersey Boys sing Christmas Songs	No
December 4	Kelly Ripa & Michael Strahan	Yes	Jane Fonda, Gabby Douglas, Ed Sheeran, Holidays in New York Week – Holiday Tweets from the Audience	No
December 5	Kelly Ripa & Michael Strahan	Yes	Elijah Wood, Katherine Jenkins, Holidays in New York Week – Kelly visits The Nutcracker	No
December 6	Kelly Ripa & Michael Strahan	Yes	Laura Linney, Scott Baio, Holidays in New York Week – Michael's Broadway Debut in Elf	No
December 7	Kelly Ripa & Michael Strahan	Yes	Keira Knightley, Donnie Wahlberg, Holidays in New York Week – Michael and his Daughters Tour New York	No
December 10	Kelly Ripa & Michael Strahan	Yes	Hugh Jackman, Howie Mandel, LIVE's Holiday Hits Week – Richard Marx	No
December 11	Kelly Ripa & Michael Strahan	Yes	Mandy Patinkin, LIVE's Holiday Hits Week – Lifehouse	No
December 12	Kelly Ripa & Michael Strahan	Yes	Anne Hathaway, Alan Cumming, LIVE's Holiday Hits Week – Ashanti	Yes
December 13	Kelly Ripa & Michael Strahan	Yes	Don Johnson, Eddie Redmayne, LIVE's Holiday Hits Week – Colbie Caillat	No
December 14	Kelly Ripa & Michael Strahan	Yes	Ewan McGregor, Kerry Washington, LIVE's Holiday Hits Week – Jackie Evancho	No
December 17	Kelly Ripa & Michael Strahan	Yes	Paul Rudd, Christoph Waltz, LIVE's Countdown to Christmas – Lizzie Post	No
December 18	Kelly Ripa & Michael Strahan	Yes	Seth Rogen, LIVE's Countdown to Christmas – Lilla Crawford	Yes
December 19	Kelly Ripa & Michael Strahan	Yes	John Travolta & Olivia Newton-John, LIVE's Countdown to Christmas – Lance Ulanoff	No
December 20	Kelly Ripa & Michael Strahan	Yes	Samuel L. Jackson, Cassadee Pope, LIVE's Countdown to Christmas – Katie Brown	No
December 21	Kelly Ripa & Michael Strahan	Yes	Richard Gere, Disney on Ice: Rockin' Ever After, LIVE's Countdown to Christmas – Love Chef	Yes
December 24	Kelly Ripa & Michael Strahan	Yes	LIVE's Christmas Eve Special: Matt Damon, Aretha Franklin, Santa	No

=== January 2013 ===
Date	Co-Hosts	"Host Chat"	Guests/Segments	"Kelly and Michael's Inbox"
January 2	Kelly Ripa & Michael Strahan	Yes	Matthew Morrison, Whitney Cummings, Michael asks New Yorkers about New Year's Resolutions	Yes
January 7	Kelly Ripa & Michael Strahan	Yes	Betty White, Sean Lowe, Kick Start the New Year Week – Prevention Magazine	No
January 8	Kelly Ripa & Michael Strahan	Yes	Jessica Chastain, Busy Philipps, Kick Start the New Year Week – Farnoosh Torabi	No
January 9	Kelly Ripa & Michael Strahan	Yes	David Duchovny, Marlon Wayans, Kick Start the New Year Week – Dr. Melina Jampolis	No
January 10	Kelly Ripa & Michael Strahan	Yes	William H. Macy, Jenna Elfman, Kick Start the New Year Week – Kristen Brown	No
January 11	Kelly Ripa & Michael Strahan	Yes	Ginnifer Goodwin, Dr. Greg Yapalater, Kick Start the New Year Week – Carley Roney	No
January 14	Kelly Ripa & Michael Strahan	Yes	Chris Colfer, AnnaSophia Robb, Workout With Us Week – Michael	Yes
January 15	Kelly Ripa & Michael Strahan	Yes	Mark Wahlberg, Kim and Khloé Kardashian, Workout With Us Week – Fitness Apps	No
January 16	Kelly Ripa & Michael Strahan	Yes	Ryan Seacrest, Workout With Us Week – Kelly	Yes
January 17	Kelly Ripa & Michael Strahan	Yes	Catherine Zeta-Jones, Matt Bomer, Workout With Us Week – Presidential Fitness Test Challenge	No
January 18	Kelly Ripa & Michael Strahan	Yes	Kevin Bacon, Allison Williams, Workout With Us Week – Gelman	No
January 22	Kelly Ripa & Michael Strahan	Yes	Jeremy Renner, Taye Diggs	No
January 23	Kelly Ripa & Michael Strahan	Yes	Jason Statham, Christine Baranski, Olly Murs	No
January 24	Kelly Ripa & Michael Strahan	Yes	Jennifer Lawrence, Anthony Anderson	No
January 25	Kelly Ripa & Michael Strahan	Yes	Lena Dunham, Nicholas Hoult	Yes
January 28	Kelly Ripa & Michael Strahan	Yes	Dustin Hoffman, Linda Gray	Yes
January 29	Kelly Ripa & Michael Strahan	Yes	Melissa McCarthy, Stephen Amell	No
January 30	Kelly Ripa & Michael Strahan	Yes	Keri Russell, Chris Harrison	Yes
January 31	Kelly Ripa & Michael Strahan	Yes	Jason Bateman, Jonny Lee Miller	No

=== February 2013 ===
Date	Co-Hosts	"Host Chat"	Guests/Segments	"Kelly and Michael's Inbox"
February 1	Kelly Ripa & Michael Strahan	Yes	Sarah Jessica Parker, Kate Mara	Yes
February 4	Kelly Ripa & Michael Strahan	Yes	Russell Brand, Pauley Perrette, Super Bowl Retrospective with Michael	No
February 5	Kelly Ripa & Michael Strahan	Yes	Katharine McPhee, Leeza Gibbons, Announcement of Girl's Night Out: Oscar Edition Winners	No
February 6	Kelly Ripa & Michael Strahan	Yes	Eric Stonestreet, Reba, Ray Rice	Yes
February 7	Kelly Ripa & Michael Strahan	Yes	Rooney Mara, Josh Groban, Kelly's Recap of the Empire State Building Run-Up	Yes
February 8	Kelly Ripa & Michael Strahan	Yes	Jennifer Hudson, Madeline Stowe, Joe Flacco	Yes
February 11	Kelly Ripa & Michael Strahan	Yes	Emmy Rossum, Jane Lynch, Lori Bergamotto	No
February 12	Kelly Ripa & Michael Strahan	Yes	Viola Davis, Neon Trees, Chris Byrne	No
February 13	Kelly Ripa & Michael Strahan	Yes	Josh Duhamel, Anthony Edwards, Jillian Michaels	No
February 14	Kelly Ripa & Michael Strahan	Yes	Bruce Willis, Molly Shannon, Andrew Zimmern	No
February 15	Kelly Ripa & Michael Strahan	Yes	Heidi Klum, Snooki and JWoww, Quvenzhané Wallis	No
February 18	Kelly Ripa & Michael Strahan	Yes	LIVE! at Walt Disney World Resort: Jon Cryer, Kat Graham, Michael Tours Fantasyland with his Daughters, LIVE's Disney Family Face Off – Day 1	No
February 19	Kelly Ripa & Michael Strahan	Yes	LIVE! at Walt Disney World Resort: Howie Mandel, Gary Allan, Howie pranks Park Visitors, LIVE's Disney Family Face Off – Day 2	No
February 20	Kelly Ripa & Michael Strahan	Yes	LIVE! at Walt Disney World Resort: Johnny Galecki, Chris Wallace, Kelly rides the Test Track, LIVE's Disney Family Face Off – Day 3	No
February 21	Kelly Ripa & Michael Strahan	Yes	LIVE! at Walt Disney World Resort: Zach Braff, Ne-Yo, Michael has a Boy's Night Out, LIVE's Disney Family Face Off – Day 4	No
February 22	Kelly Ripa & Michael Strahan	Yes	LIVE's Pre-Oscar Celebration: Oscar Recap, Carley Roney, Girls of Girls' Night Out: Oscar Edition, Kelly looks for an Oscar Dress	No
February 25	Kelly Ripa & Michael Strahan	Yes	LIVE! with Kelly and Michael After Oscar Show: Jabbawockeez, Christoph Waltz, Jimmy Kimmel, Maria Menounos, Carson Kressley, Lawrence Zarian	No
February 26	Kelly Ripa & Michael Strahan	Yes	Scarlett Johansson, Megan Hilty, Girls' Night Out: Oscar Edition Recap	No
February 27	Kelly Ripa & Michael Strahan	Yes	Donald Trump, Taraji P. Henson	No
February 28	Kelly Ripa & Michael Strahan	Yes	Cheryl Hines, Dr. Ian Smith, OneRepublic	Yes

=== March 2013 ===
Date	Co-Hosts	"Host Chat"	Guests/Segments	"Kelly and Michael's Inbox"
March 1	Kelly Ripa & Michael Strahan	Yes	Mariah Carey, Maggie Q, Ryan Seacrest	No
March 4	Kelly Ripa & Michael Strahan	Yes	Matthew Fox, Zosia Mamet	Yes
March 5	Kelly Ripa & Michael Strahan	Yes	Tina Fey, Gillian Jacobs, Announcement of LIVE's Top Teacher Search	No
March 6	Kelly Ripa & Michael Strahan	Yes	James Franco, Tom Coughlin, Jennifer Love Hewitt	No
March 7	Kelly Ripa & Michael Strahan	Yes	Goran Visnjic, Peter Gros	Yes
March 8	Kelly Ripa & Michael Strahan	Yes	Nicole Richie, Jesse Metcalfe, Announcement of LIVE's Search for Unstoppable Moms Finalists	Yes
March 11	Kelly Ripa & Michael Strahan	Yes	Angela Bassett, Bridgit Mendler, LIVE's Search for Unstoppable Moms Finalists Week – Mary Lou King	No
March 12	Kelly Ripa & Michael Strahan	Yes	Josh Charles, Sean Lowe, LIVE's Search for Unstoppable Moms Finalists Week – Katie Broadus	No
March 13	Kelly Ripa & Michael Strahan	Yes	Ian Somerhalder, Abigail Breslin, LIVE's Search for Unstoppable Moms Finalists Week – Trelawney McCoy	Yes
March 14	Kelly Ripa & Michael Strahan	Yes	Josh Henderson, Jeff Probst, LIVE's Search for Unstoppable Moms Finalists Week – Andrea Cortes	No
March 15	Kelly Ripa & Michael Strahan	Yes	Ryan Reynolds, James Purefoy, LIVE's Search for Unstoppable Moms Finalists Week – Winner Announced	No
March 18	Kelly Ripa & Michael Strahan	Yes	Emma Stone, Timothy Olyphant	Yes
March 19	Kelly Ripa & Michael Strahan	Yes	Gerard Butler, Latest Prom Trends from Teen Vogue Magazine	Yes
March 25	Michael Strahan & Kristin Chenoweth	Yes	Usher, Paul Jolley, LIVE's Auto Show Week – Environmentally Green Cars	No
March 26	Michael Strahan & Kristin Chenoweth	Yes	Kim Kardashian, Dido, Clip from Family Weekend, LIVE's Auto Show Week – Sporty Cars	No
March 27	Michael Strahan & Vanessa Williams	Yes	Dwayne Johnson, Florida Georgia Line, Clip from Temptation, LIVE's Auto Show Week – Hatchbacks	No
March 28	Michael Strahan & Maria Menounos	Yes	Jeremy Piven, Blake Shelton, LIVE's Auto Show Week – Versatility Vehicles	No
March 29	Michael Strahan & Erin Andrews	Yes	Tyler Perry, Ed Sheeran, LIVE's Auto Show Week – Michael visits the Auto Show	No

=== April 2013 ===
Date	Co-Hosts	"Host Chat"	Guests/Segments	"Kelly and Michael's Inbox"
April 1	Michael Strahan & Robin Roberts	Yes	Laurence Fishburne, Stana Katic, Devin Velez	No
April 2	Kelly Ripa & Michael Strahan	Yes	Rosario Dawson, Andy Cohen, The Bacon Brothers	No
April 3	Kelly Ripa & Michael Strahan	Yes	Jeremy Irons, Jeremy Sisto, Juanes	No
April 4	Kelly Ripa & Michael Strahan	Yes	Shia LaBeouf, Rita Wilson, Lisa Vanderpump & Gleb Savchenko	Yes
April 5	Kelly Ripa & Michael Strahan	Yes	Chelsea Handler, Jane Levy	Yes
April 8	Kelly Ripa & Michael Strahan	Yes	John Cena, Eva Longoria, Jordana Brewster, Burnell Taylor	No
April 9	Kelly Ripa & Michael Strahan	Yes	Alexander Skarsgård, Jason O'Mara, Kenya Moore	No
April 10	Kelly Ripa & Michael Strahan	Yes	Joan Rivers, Ashley Tisdale	Yes
April 11	Kelly Ripa & Michael Strahan	Yes	Demi Lovato, Kurt Warner	No
April 12	Kelly Ripa & Michael Strahan	Yes	David Hyde Pierce, Josh Dallas, Avery Molek, Announcement of LIVE's Top Teacher Search Semi-Finalists	No
April 15	Kelly Ripa & Randy Jackson	Yes	Mark Wahlberg, Emilia Clarke, Lazaro Arbos	Yes
April 16	Kelly Ripa & Peter Facinelli	Yes	Alan Cumming, Caroline Kennedy, Clip from Nurse Jackie, Announcement of Top 5 Teachers in LIVE's Top Teacher Search	Yes
April 17	Kelly Ripa & Mark Feuerstein	Yes	Brad Garrett, Nick Lachey	No
April 18	Kelly Ripa & Carrie Ann Inaba	Yes	Zac Efron, The Jonas Brothers, Caring for Unusual Pets	No
April 19	Kelly Ripa & Carson Kressley	Yes	Susan Sarandon, Cher Lloyd, Performers from Totem	Yes
April 22	Kelly Ripa & Michael Strahan	Yes	Pierce Brosnan, Jake Johnson, Janelle Arthur	No
April 23	Kelly Ripa & Michael Strahan	Yes	Kate Hudson, Christina Hendricks, Roger Goodell	No
April 24	Kelly Ripa & Michael Strahan	Yes	Jon Hamm, Snoop Lion, AJ Clemente	No
April 25	Kelly Ripa & Michael Strahan	Yes	Laura Linney, Michael Bublé, Victor Ortiz & Lindsay Arnold, AJ Clemente at Love is All You Need	No
April 26	Kelly Ripa & Michael Strahan	Yes	Don Cheadle, Geraldo Rivera, Emeli Sandé, Announcement of Top Teacher Grand Prize	No
April 29	Kelly Ripa & Michael Strahan	Yes	Lauren Graham, Hugh Dancy, Top Teacher Week – Rick Zano	No
April 30	Kelly Ripa & Michael Strahan	Yes	Robert Downey Jr., Carl Edwards, Top Teacher Week – Kathy Green	No

=== May 2013 ===
Date	Co-Hosts	"Host Chat"	Guests/Segments	"Kelly and Michael's Inbox"
May 1	Kelly Ripa & Michael Strahan	Yes	Jim Parsons, Carly Rae Jepsen, Top Teacher Week – Ann Marie Rooney	No
May 2	Kelly Ripa & Michael Strahan	Yes	Ben Kingsley, Andy Dick & Sharna Burgess, Top Teacher Week – Suzette Steward	No
May 3	Kelly Ripa & Michael Strahan	Yes	Isla Fisher, Chris O'Dowd, Top Teacher Week – Erin Palonen	No
May 6	Kelly Ripa & Michael Strahan	Yes	Kerry Washington, Psy, Amber Holcomb, New You in New York Makeover Week	No
May 7	Kelly Ripa & Michael Strahan	Yes	Zooey Deschanel, Zachary Quinto, Suzette Steward Announced as 2013 Top Teacher Winner, New You in New York Makeover Week	No
May 8	Kelly Ripa & Michael Strahan	Yes	Jessica Alba, Katie Couric, New You in New York Makeover Week	No
May 9	Kelly Ripa & Michael Strahan	Yes	Tobey Maguire, Sean Lowe & Peta Murgatroyd, Massage Envy Audience Giveaway, New You in New York Makeover Week	Yes
May 10	Kelly Ripa & Michael Strahan	Yes	Carey Mulligan, Rod Stewart, New You in New York Makeover Week	No
May 13	Kelly Ripa & Michael Strahan	Yes	Jimmy Kimmel, Alyson Hannigan, Kelly & Michael's Fitness Challenge Week – Animal Flow Workout with Mike Fitch	No
May 14	Kelly Ripa & Michael Strahan	Yes	Mark Harmon, Huey Lewis and the News, Kelly & Michael's Fitness Challenge Week – Baby Bootie Camp with Nikki Gor	No
May 15	Kelly Ripa & Michael Strahan	Yes	Jesse Tyler Ferguson, Kelly & Michael's Fitness Challenge Week – CrossFit Challenge with Megan May	Yes
May 16	Kelly Ripa & Michael Strahan	Yes	Zoe Saldaña, Ingo Rademacher & Kym Johnson, Kelly & Michael's Fitness Challenge Week – Super Bowl Bet Payoff Workout with Anna Kaiser	No
May 17	Kelly Ripa & Michael Strahan	Yes	Connie Britton, Michael visits Houston and receives his Honorary Doctorate, Kelly & Michael's Fitness Challenge Week – Acroyoga	No
May 20	Kelly Ripa & Michael Strahan	Yes	Colin Farrell, Elisabeth Moss, Winners Week – Candice Glover	No
May 21	Kelly Ripa & Michael Strahan	Yes	Psy, Kree Harrison, Winners Week – Trace Adkins	No
May 22	Kelly Ripa & Michael Strahan	Yes	Morgan Freeman, Angie Miller, Winners Week – Kellie Pickler & Derek Hough	Yes
May 23	Kelly Ripa & Carson Kressley	Yes	Ken Jeong, Zendaya & Val Chmerkovskiy, Winners Week – National Geographic Bee Winner	No
May 24	Kelly Ripa & Michael Strahan	Yes	Ethan Hawke, Jacoby Jones & Karina Smirnoff, Alexandra Raisman & Mark Ballas, LIVE's Truckin' Amazing Cook-Off, Winners Week – MathCounts Winner	No
May 27	Kelly Ripa & Michael Strahan	Yes	Heather Graham, Desiree Hartsock, Demi Lovato	No
May 28	Kelly Ripa & Michael Strahan	Yes	Tyler Perry, Oprah Winfrey, Trisha Yearwood	No
May 29	Kelly Ripa & Michael Strahan	Yes	Clive Owen, Khloé Kardashian Odom, Il Volo	Yes
May 30	Kelly Ripa & Michael Strahan	Yes	Anderson Davis, Steven Tyler, The Wanted	No
May 31	Kelly Ripa & Michael Strahan	Yes	Mark Ruffalo, Melissa Joan Hart, Jason Miller, LIVE's Truckin' Amazing Cook-Off	No

=== June 2013 ===
Date	Co-Hosts	"Host Chat"	Guests/Segments	"Kelly and Michael's Inbox"
June 3	Kelly Ripa & Michael Strahan	Yes	Alyssa Milano, Arvind Mahankali	Yes
June 4	Kelly Ripa & Michael Strahan	Yes	Neil Patrick Harris, Rose Byrne, Barenaked Ladies	Yes
June 5	Kelly Ripa & Michael Strahan	Yes	Vince Vaughn, Rick Schwartz and Animals from the San Diego Zoo	No
June 6	Kelly Ripa & Michael Strahan	Yes	Jeffrey Donovan, Beth Behrs	Yes
June 7	Kelly Ripa & Michael Strahan	Yes	Rebecca Romijn, LIVE's Truckin' Amazing Cook-Off	Yes
June 10	Kelly Ripa & Howie Mandel	Yes	Henry Cavill, Little Mix	Yes
June 11	Kelly Ripa & Andy Samberg	Yes	Seth Rogen, Judith Light	Yes
June 12	Kelly Ripa & Lucy Liu	Yes	Mark Feuerstein, Caroline Rhea, The Goo Goo Dolls	Yes
June 13	Kelly Ripa & Jerry Seinfeld	Yes	Kevin Costner, Leo Howard, Matchbox Twenty	No
June 14	Kelly Ripa & Mark Consuelos	Yes	Russell Crowe, Brad Keselowski, Avril Lavigne, LIVE's Truckin' Amazing Cook-Off	No
June 17	Kelly Ripa & Michael Strahan	Yes	Bret Michaels, LIVE's Truckin' Amazing Cook-Off	No
June 18	Kelly Ripa & Michael Strahan	Yes	Mark Cuban, Gabriel Mann	Yes
June 24	Michael Strahan & Carrie Ann Inaba	Yes	Melissa McCarthy, Armie Hammer	No
June 25	Michael Strahan & Carrie Ann Inaba	Yes	Channing Tatum, Eric McCormack	Yes
June 26	Michael Strahan & Kristin Chenoweth	Yes	Steve Carell, Miley Cyrus, The Backstreet Boys	No
June 27	Michael Strahan & Erin Andrews	Yes	Sandra Bullock, Ginny Blackmore	Yes
June 28	Michael Strahan & Erin Andrews	Yes	Jamie Foxx, Allison Janney, LIVE's Truckin' Amazing Cook-Off	No

=== July 2013 ===
Date	Co-Hosts	"Host Chat"	Guests/Segments	"Kelly and Michael's Inbox"
July 1	Kelly Ripa & Michael Strahan	Yes	Miranda Cosgrove, Aaron Tveit	Yes
July 2	Kelly Ripa & Michael Strahan	Yes	Mike Campbell, Nick Cannon, Sasha Alexander, Juicing with Dr. Wendy Bazillian	No
July 3	Kelly Ripa & Michael Strahan	Yes	Jane Lynch, Nicole Murphy	No
July 4	Kelly Ripa & Michael Strahan	Yes	Benjamin Bratt, Sig Hansen & Keith Colburn, Guy Fieri	No
July 5	Kelly Ripa & Michael Strahan	Yes	Liev Schreiber, Mary Murphy, LIVE's Truckin' Amazing Cook-Off	No
July 8	Kelly Ripa & Michael Strahan	Yes	Olivia Munn, Cory Booker, LIVE's Bow Wow Week: Puppy Edition	No
July 9	Kelly Ripa & Michael Strahan	Yes	David Spade, Bear Grylls, LIVE's Bow Wow Week: Puppy Edition	No
July 10	Kelly Ripa & Michael Strahan	Yes	Adam Sandler, Ciara, LIVE's Bow Wow Week: Puppy Edition	No
July 11	Kelly Ripa & Michael Strahan	Yes	Salma Hayek Pinault, LIVE's Bow Wow Week: Puppy Edition	Yes
July 12	Kelly Ripa & Michael Strahan	Yes	Kevin James, LIVE's Truckin' Amazing Cook-Off, LIVE's Bow Wow Week: Puppy Edition	No
July 15	Kelly Ripa & Michael Strahan	Yes	Helen Mirren, Howie Mandel, John Cena	No
July 16	Kelly Ripa & Michael Strahan	Yes	Mary-Louise Parker, Cody Simpson	No
July 17	Kelly Ripa & Michael Strahan	Yes	Josh Duhamel, Sara Bareilles	Yes
July 18	Kelly Ripa & Michael Strahan	Yes	Jeff Bridges, Marc Anthony, Shaquille O'Neal	Yes
July 19	Kelly Ripa & Michael Strahan	Yes	Ryan Reynolds, Ross Lynch, LIVE's Truckin' Amazing Cook-Off	No
July 22	Kelly Ripa & Michael Strahan	Yes	Octavia Spencer, Daniel Sunjata, LIVE on Broadway Week – Backstage at Pippin	Yes
July 23	Kelly Ripa & Michael Strahan	Yes	Heidi Klum, LIVE on Broadway Week – Motown: The Musical	Yes
July 24	Kelly Ripa & Michael Strahan	Yes	Hugh Jackman, LIVE on Broadway Week – Kelly performs with Broadway's Cinderella	No
July 25	Kelly Ripa & Michael Strahan	Yes	Stanley Tucci, LIVE on Broadway Week – Backstage at Kinky Boots	No
July 26	Kelly Ripa & Michael Strahan	Yes	Selena Gomez, LIVE's Truckin' Amazing Cook-Off, LIVE on Broadway Week – Matilda: The Musical	No
July 29	Kelly Ripa & Michael Strahan	Yes	Mark Wahlberg, Chloë Grace Moretz, LIVE's Truckin' Amazing Cook-Off Top 4 Finalists	Yes
July 30	Kelly Ripa & Michael Strahan	Yes	Denzel Washington, Hank Azaria, Robert Randolph & the Family Band	No
July 31	Kelly Ripa & Michael Strahan	Yes	Matt Damon, Jayma Mays, LIVE's Truckin' Amazing Cook-Off Top 2 Finalists	Yes

=== August 2013 ===
Date	Co-Hosts	"Host Chat"	Guests/Segments	"Kelly and Michael's Inbox"
August 1	Kelly Ripa & Michael Strahan	Yes	Bryan Cranston, Poppy Montgomery, Passenger	No
August 2	Kelly Ripa & Michael Strahan	Yes	Sharon Stone, Matthew Morrison, LIVE's Truckin' Amazing Cook-Off Top 2 Finalists Compete	No
August 5	Michael Strahan & Robin Roberts	Yes	Liam Hemsworth, Jason Sudeikis	Yes
August 6	Michael Strahan & Erin Andrews	Yes	Oprah Winfrey, Desiree Hartsock	No
August 7	Michael Strahan & Erin Andrews	Yes	Amanda Seyfried, Chris Colfer	No
August 8	Michael Strahan & Nicole Richie	Yes	Lenny Kravitz, Emma Roberts	Yes
August 9	Michael Strahan & Nicole Richie	Yes	Ashton Kutcher, Brett Eldredge	Yes
August 12	Michael Strahan & Rebecca Romijn	Yes	Jeff Daniels, Jennifer Coolidge	No
August 13	Michael Strahan & Rebecca Romijn	Yes	Jason Dufner, Joe Manganiello, Keri Russell, Carrie Underwood	No
August 14	Michael Strahan & Maria Menounos	Yes	Forest Whitaker, Cast of Duck Dynasty	No
August 15	Michael Strahan & Maria Menounos	Yes	Harrison Ford, Cooking with Maria	Yes
August 16	Michael Strahan & Whitney Cummings	Yes	Cuba Gooding Jr., Lucy Danziger	Yes

== Season 26 (2013–14) ==
=== September 2013 ===
Date	Co-hosts	"Host chat"	Guests / segments	"Kelly and Michael's Inbox"
September 2	Kelly Ripa & Michael Strahan	Yes	Lisa Kudrow, Selena Gomez, Dr. Wendy Bazilian	No
September 3	Kelly Ripa & Michael Strahan	Yes	Demi Lovato, Cedric the Entertainer, Jennifer Nettles, The Anniversary Games	No
September 4	Kelly Ripa & Michael Strahan	Yes	Zachary Quinto, Mel B, Tamar Braxton, The Anniversary Games	No
September 5	Kelly Ripa & Michael Strahan	Yes	Arsenio Hall, Jennifer Hudson, Ariana Grande, The Anniversary Games	No
September 6	Kelly Ripa & Michael Strahan	Yes	FOX NFL Sunday Broadcasters, Jake Johnson, John Legend, The Anniversary Games	No
September 9	Kelly Ripa & Michael Strahan	Yes	Serena Williams, Katie Couric, Stacy Keibler, The Anniversary Games	No
September 10	Kelly Ripa & Michael Strahan	Yes	Howie Mandel, Sean Kingston, The Anniversary Games	No
September 11	Kelly Ripa & Michael Strahan	Yes	Michelle Pfeiffer, Rachael Ray, The Anniversary Games	No
September 12	Kelly Ripa & Michael Strahan	Yes	Ricky Gervais, LIVE's Biggest Fan Trivia Showdown	No
September 13	Kelly Ripa & Michael Strahan	Yes	'LIVE's First Anniversary Viewer's Choice Show'	No
September 16	Kelly Ripa & Michael Strahan	Yes	Julia Louis-Dreyfus, Emily Deschanel	No
September 17	Kelly Ripa & Michael Strahan	Yes	Taye Diggs, Mindy Kaling, Nina Davuluri	No
September 18	Kelly Ripa & Michael Strahan	Yes	Jake Gyllenhaal, Mike Tyson, Science Bob	No
September 19	Kelly Ripa & Michael Strahan	Yes	Tom Selleck, Toni Collette	Yes
September 20	Kelly Ripa & Michael Strahan	Yes	Dylan McDermott, Andre Braugher	No
September 23	Kelly Ripa & Michael Strahan	Yes	Scarlett Johansson, James Spader, Lawrence Zarian	No
September 24	Kelly Ripa & Michael Strahan	Yes	Joseph Gordon-Levitt, Clark Gregg, Jason Derulo	No
September 25	Kelly Ripa & Michael Strahan	Yes	Michael J. Fox, Sofía Vergara, Blake Shelton	No
September 26	Kelly Ripa & Michael Strahan	Yes	Robin Williams, Peter Krause	No
September 27	Kelly Ripa & Michael Strahan	Yes	Julianna Margulies, Floyd Mayweather, Emily VanCamp	No
September 30	Kelly Ripa & Michael Strahan	Yes	Daniel Radcliffe, Jerry O'Connell	No

=== October 2013 ===
Date	Co-hosts	"Host chat"	Guests / segments	"Kelly and Michael's Inbox"
October 1	Kelly Ripa & Michael Strahan	Yes	Cher, Theresa Caputo	No
October 2	Kelly Ripa & Michael Strahan	Yes	Rebel Wilson, Blair Underwood, Peter Gros	No
October 3	Kelly Ripa & Michael Strahan	Yes	Sandra Bullock, Tony Goldwyn	Yes
October 4	Kelly Ripa & Michael Strahan	Yes	Kimberly Williams-Paisley, Hilaria Baldwin	No
October 7	Kelly Ripa & Michael Strahan	Yes	Tom Hanks, Diana Nyad	No
October 8	Kelly Ripa & Michael Strahan	Yes	Sarah Michelle Gellar, Jessica Seinfeld	No
October 9	Kelly Ripa & Michael Strahan	Yes	Hayden Panettiere, Max Irons	Yes
October 10	Kelly Ripa & Michael Strahan	Yes	Sandra Oh, David Boreanaz	Yes
October 11	Kelly Ripa & Michael Strahan	Yes	Donnie Wahlberg, Elizabeth Olsen	Yes
October 14	Kelly Ripa & Michael Strahan	Yes	Julianne Hough, Matt Bomer, Natalie Savant, John Legend	No
October 15	Kelly Ripa & Michael Strahan	Yes	CeeLo Green, Anna Faris, Cher Lloyd	No
October 16	Kelly Ripa & Michael Strahan	Yes	Elton John, Matt Czuchry	No
October 17	Kelly Ripa & Michael Strahan	Yes	Ian Somerhalder, Chloë Grace Moretz, World's Largest Pumpkin	No
October 18	Kelly Ripa & Michael Strahan	Yes	Arnold Schwarzenegger, Barkhad Abdi	No
October 21	Kelly Ripa & Michael Strahan	Yes	Ted Danson, Jennifer Morrison	No
October 22	Kelly Ripa & Michael Strahan	Yes	Johnny Knoxville, Alyssa Milano, Fifth Harmony	No
October 23	Kelly Ripa & Michael Strahan	Yes	John Lithgow, Natalie Dormer, Dr. Greg Yapalater	No
October 24	Kelly Ripa & Michael Strahan	Yes	Javier Bardem, Jenna Dewan-Tatum	Yes
October 25	Kelly Ripa & Michael Strahan	Yes	Orlando Bloom, Malin Åkerman, Science Bob	No
October 28	Kelly Ripa & Michael Strahan	Yes	Robert De Niro, Jackson Nicoll	No
October 29	Kelly Ripa & Michael Strahan	Yes	Mary Steenburgen, Animals from San Diego Zoo, Kids of LIVE Halloween Fashion Show	No
October 30	Kelly Ripa & Michael Strahan	Yes	Will Arnett, Minka Kelly	Yes
October 31	Kelly Ripa & Michael Strahan	Yes	'LIVE's Best Halloween Show Ever'	No

=== November 2013 ===
Date	Co-hosts	"Host chat"	Guests / segments	"Kelly and Michael's Inbox"
November 1	Kelly Ripa & Michael Strahan	Yes	Michael Douglas, Abigail Breslin	No
November 4	Kelly Ripa & Michael Strahan	Yes	Jason Statham, Pharrell Williams, Behind-the-Scenes Week – Halloween Show	No
November 5	Kelly Ripa & Michael Strahan	Yes	Chris Hemsworth, The Wanted, David Ortiz, Behind-the-Scenes Week – Kelly	No
November 6	Kelly Ripa & Michael Strahan	Yes	Rob Lowe, Behind-the-Scenes Week – Michael	Yes
November 7	Kelly Ripa & Michael Strahan	Yes	Kevin Kline, Jane Lynch, Behind-the-Scenes Week – The LIVE Staff	No
November 8	Kelly Ripa & Michael Strahan	Yes	Bruce Dern, Carrie Ann Inaba, Behind-the-Scenes Week – The Audience	No
November 11	Kelly Ripa & Michael Strahan	Yes	Mark Consuelos, Jessica Lange, Andrew Zimmern	No
November 12	Kelly Ripa & Michael Strahan	Yes	Ricky Martin, Idina Menzel	No
November 13	Kelly Ripa & Michael Strahan	Yes	Naomi Watts, Evan Rachel Wood, Dima Shine	No
November 14	Kelly Ripa & Michael Strahan	Yes	Seth Meyers, Idris Elba, María Gabriela Isler	No
November 15	Kelly Ripa & Michael Strahan	Yes	Adam Levine, Cobie Smulders, Daughtry	No
November 18	Kelly Ripa & Michael Strahan	Yes	Vince Vaughn, David Blaine, LIVE's Thanksgiving Family Recipe Week – Nicole Murphy	No
November 19	Kelly Ripa & Michael Strahan	Yes	Josh Hutcherson, Anjelica Huston, Jimmie Johnson, LIVE's Thanksgiving Family Recipe Week – Kelly	No
November 20	Kelly Ripa & Michael Strahan	Yes	Jennifer Lawrence, Chiwetel Ejiofor, LIVE's Thanksgiving Family Recipe Week – Camilla Consuelos	No
November 21	Kelly Ripa & Michael Strahan	Yes	Liam Hemsworth, James Brolin, LIVE's Thanksgiving Family Recipe Week – Louise Strahan	No
November 22	Kelly Ripa & Michael Strahan	Yes	Jennifer Hudson, Nicole Polizzi & Jenni Farley, LIVE's Thanksgiving Family Recipe Week – Gelman	No
November 25	Kelly Ripa & Michael Strahan	Yes	Stanley Tucci, Amber Tamblyn, John Cena	No
November 26	Kelly Ripa & Michael Strahan	Yes	Billy Crystal, Bridget Moynahan	Yes
November 27	Kelly Ripa & Michael Strahan	Yes	Woody Harrelson, Jena Malone, Sarah Silverman	No
November 29	Kelly Ripa & Michael Strahan	Yes	Forest Whitaker, Damian Lewis, Colbie Caillat	No

=== December 2013 ===
Date	Co-hosts	"Host chat"	Guests / segments	"Kelly and Michael's Inbox"
December 2	Kelly Ripa & Michael Strahan	Yes	Stephen Moyer, Sheryl Crow	Yes
December 3	Kelly Ripa & Michael Strahan	Yes	Claire Danes, Joe Manganiello, Goo Goo Dolls	No
December 4	Kelly Ripa & Michael Strahan	Yes	Mark Wahlberg, NeNe Leakes	Yes
December 5	Kelly Ripa & Michael Strahan	Yes	Zoe Saldaña, Mandy Patinkin, Leona Lewis	No
December 6	Kelly Ripa & Michael Strahan	Yes	John Goodman, Lupita Nyong'o	No
December 9	Kelly Ripa & Mark Consuelos	Yes	Tyler Perry, Faith Ford, LIVE's Holiday Gift Guide – Eva Chen	No
December 10	Kelly Ripa & Michael Strahan	Yes	Amy Adams, Jimmy Smits, LIVE's Holiday Gift Guide – Chris Byrne	No
December 11	Kelly Ripa & Michael Strahan	Yes	Emma Thompson, Guy Fieri, LIVE's Holiday Gift Guide – Katie Brown	No
December 12	Kelly Ripa & Michael Strahan	Yes	Jonah Hill, Ylvis, LIVE's Holiday Gift Guide – Amy Astley	Yes
December 13	Kelly Ripa & Michael Strahan	Yes	Evangeline Lilly, Larry the Cable Guy, LIVE's Holiday Gift Guide – David Pogue	No
December 16	Kelly Ripa & Michael Strahan	Yes	Christina Applegate, John Leguizamo, All-Star Chef's Holiday Home Cooking Week – Alfred Portale	No
December 17	Kelly Ripa & Michael Strahan	Yes	Will Ferrell, Candice Glover, All-Star Chef's Holiday Home Cooking Week – Jean-Georges Vongerichten	No
December 18	Kelly Ripa & Michael Strahan	Yes	Paul Rudd, Bradley Cooper, All-Star Chef's Holiday Home Cooking Week – Daniel Boulud	No
December 19	Kelly Ripa & Michael Strahan	Yes	Keanu Reeves, Tessanne Chin, All-Star Chef's Holiday Home Cooking Week – Andrew Carmellini	No
December 20	Kelly Ripa & Michael Strahan	Yes	Jeremy Renner, Lenny Kravitz, All-Star Chef's Holiday Home Cooking Week – Marc Forgione	No
December 23	Kelly Ripa & Michael Strahan	Yes	Steve Carell, American Authors	Yes
December 24	Kelly Ripa & Michael Strahan	Yes	'LIVE's Cozy Christmas Eve': Ben Stiller, Trans-Siberian Orchestra, Disney on Ice, Baking with Kelly's Kids, Santa	No
December 30	Kelly Ripa & Michael Strahan	Yes	Kristen Wiig, Juliette Lewis	No
December 31	Kelly Ripa & Michael Strahan	No	'LIVE's End of the Year Special'	No

=== January 2014 ===
Date	Co-hosts	"Host chat"	Guests / segments	"Kelly and Michael's Inbox"
January 6	Kelly Ripa & Michael Strahan	Yes	Carey Mulligan, Allison Williams, Juan Pablo Galavis, Kick Start the New Year: Fitness Edition Week – Fitness IQ Test	No
January 7	Kelly Ripa & Michael Strahan	Yes	Ryan Seacrest, Gabrielle Union, Kick Start the New Year: Fitness Edition Week – Trampoline/Bar Hopping	No
January 8	Kelly Ripa & Michael Strahan	Yes	Jessica Simpson, Kellan Lutz, Kick Start the New Year: Fitness Edition Week – Doonya Bollywood Dance	No
January 9	Kelly Ripa & Michael Strahan	Yes	Joel McHale, Oscar Isaac, Kick Start the New Year: Fitness Edition Week – Parkour	No
January 10	Kelly Ripa & Michael Strahan	Yes	Lena Dunham, Kick Start the New Year: Fitness Edition Week – Anti-Gravity Yoga	No
January 13	Kelly Ripa & Michael Strahan	Yes	Christina Ricci, Tom Mison, Kick Start the New Year: Diet Edition Week – Dr. Wendy Bazilian	No
January 14	Kelly Ripa & Michael Strahan	Yes	Debra Messing, Lucy Hale, Kick Start the New Year: Diet Edition Week – Dr. Heidi Skolnik	Yes
January 15	Kelly Ripa & Michael Strahan	Yes	Kevin Hart, Ana Gasteyer, Kick Start the New Year: Diet Edition Week – Dr. Ian Smith	No
January 16	Kelly Ripa & Michael Strahan	Yes	William H. Macy, Kick Start the New Year: Diet Edition Week – Dr. Melina Jampolis	Yes
January 17	Michael Strahan & Robin Roberts	Yes	Heather Graham, Daniel Dae Kim, Kick Start the New Year: Diet Edition Week – Mitzi Dulan	No
January 20	Kelly Ripa & Michael Strahan	Yes	Kevin Bacon, Troian Bellisario, Kick Start the New Year: Medical Edition Week – CPR with Jason Jacobsen	No
January 21	Kelly Ripa & Michael Strahan	Yes	Andy Samberg, Stephen Amell, Kick Start the New Year: Medical Edition Week – The Younger Games with Dr. Henry Lodge	No
January 22	Kelly Ripa & Michael Strahan	Yes	Rosario Dawson, Michael B. Jordan, Kick Start the New Year: Medical Edition Week – Who's Got the Beat? Heart Health Quiz with Dr. Richard Besser	No
January 23	Kelly Ripa & Anderson Cooper	Yes	Aaron Eckhart, A Great Big World, Kick Start the New Year: Medical Edition Week – The Test Test with Dr. Roshini Raj	No
January 24	Kelly Ripa & Anderson Cooper	Yes	Patrick Stewart, James Purefoy, Kick Start the New Year: Medical Edition Week – Cancer Prevention with Dr. Taz Bhatia	No
January 27	Kelly Ripa & Michael Strahan	Yes	Sara Ramirez, Jeff Garlin, LIVE's Football Frenzy Week – Budweiser Clydesdales	No
January 28	Kelly Ripa & Michael Strahan	Yes	Kate Hudson, Mindy Kaling, LIVE's Football Frenzy Week – Super Bowl Commercials	No
January 29	Kelly Ripa & Michael Strahan	Yes	Sarah Hyland, James Blunt, LIVE's Football Frenzy Week – Victor Cruz	No
January 30	Kelly Ripa & Michael Strahan	Yes	FOX NFL Sunday broadcasters, Barry Gibb, LIVE's Football Frenzy Week – Football Quiz & Super Bowl of Questions	No
January 31	Kelly Ripa & Michael Strahan	Yes	Johnny Knoxville, Drew Brees, LIVE's Football Frenzy Week – Carley Roney	No

=== February 2014 ===
Date	Co-hosts	"Host chat"	Guests / segments	"Kelly and Michael's Inbox"
February 3	Kelly Ripa & Michael Strahan	Yes	Josh Groban, Kermit the Frog	No
February 4	Kelly Ripa & Michael Strahan	Yes	Eric Stonestreet, Lance Ulanoff	No
February 5	Kelly Ripa & Michael Strahan	Yes	Nick Cannon, Rachel Bilson	Yes
February 6	Kelly Ripa & Michael Strahan	Yes	George Clooney, Karmin	No
February 7	Kelly Ripa & Michael Strahan	Yes	Matt Damon, Kenny "Babyface" Edmonds & Toni Braxton	No
February 10	Kelly Ripa & Michael Strahan	Yes	Jennifer Connelly, Ruben Studdard, #EndWinterNow Week – Leah Wyar	No
February 11	Kelly Ripa & Michael Strahan	Yes	Colin Farrell, Honey Boo Boo & Mama June, #EndWinterNow Week – Mike Hartwick	No
February 12	Kelly Ripa & Michael Strahan	Yes	Alan Cumming, Carly Rae Jepsen, #EndWinterNow Week – Men's Swimsuit Fashion Show with Lawrence Zarian	No
February 13	Kelly Ripa & Michael Strahan	Yes	Denzel Washington, Sage Kotsenburg, Joel Kinnaman, #EndWinterNow Week – Anthony Johnson & Todd Tongen	No
February 14	Kelly Ripa & Michael Strahan	Yes	Ian McKellen, Adewale, #EndWinterNow Week – Women's Swimsuit Fashion Show with Lawrence Zarian	No
February 17	Kelly Ripa & Michael Strahan	Yes	Kiefer Sutherland, Amber Heard, Brad Keselowski	No
February 18	Kelly Ripa & Michael Strahan	Yes	Matt LeBlanc, John Legend, Kit Harington	No
February 19	Kelly Ripa & Michael Strahan	Yes	Mandy Patinkin, Diogo Morgado	No
February 20	Kelly Ripa & Michael Strahan	Yes	Christian Slater, Kate Mara, The Vamps	No
February 21	Kelly Ripa & Michael Strahan	Yes	Howie Mandel, Norman Reedus, Kaitlyn Farrington	Yes
February 24	Kelly Ripa & Michael Strahan	Yes	Beth Behrs, Josh Henderson, LIVE's Look as Young as You Feel Makeover Week	No
February 25	Kelly Ripa & Michael Strahan	Yes	Chandra Wilson, Roma Downey, LIVE's Look as Young as You Feel Makeover Week	No
February 26	Kelly Ripa & Michael Strahan	Yes	Julianne Moore, Keri Russell, LIVE's Look as Young as You Feel Makeover Week	No
February 27	Kelly Ripa & Michael Strahan	Yes	Liam Neeson, Kat Dennings, LIVE's Look as Young as You Feel Makeover Week	Yes
February 28	Kelly Ripa & Michael Strahan	Yes	'LIVE's Pre-Oscar Celebration': Ben Affleck, Katie Brown, Oscar Fashion Look Back with Isaac Mizrahi and Joan Rivers, Announcement of LIVE's Look as Young as You Feel Makeover Winner	No

=== March 2014 ===
Date	Co-hosts	"Host chat"	Guests / segments	"Kelly and Michael's Inbox"
March 3	Kelly Ripa & Michael Strahan	Yes	'LIVE! with Kelly and Michael After Oscar Show': Amaluna, Lupita Nyong'o, American Authors, Maria Menounos, Carson Kressley, Lawrence Zarian	No
March 4	Kelly Ripa & Michael Strahan	Yes	Chelsea Handler, Kristen O'Connor, Oscar Night Recap	Yes
March 5	Kelly Ripa & Michael Strahan	Yes	Annette Bening, Ralph Fiennes	Yes
March 6	Kelly Ripa & Michael Strahan	Yes	Ty Burrell, Scott Foley	Yes
March 7	Kelly Ripa & Michael Strahan	Yes	Lea Michele, Patrick Duffy, Lawrence Zarian	Yes
March 10	Kelly Ripa & Michael Strahan	Yes	Kristen Bell, American Authors, LIVE's Search for Unstoppable Moms Finalists Week	No
March 11	Kelly Ripa & Michael Strahan	Yes	Robert Wagner, Kyle MacLachlan, LIVE's Search for Unstoppable Moms Finalists Week	No
March 12	Kelly Ripa & Michael Strahan	Yes	Aaron Paul, Shailene Woodley, LIVE's Search for Unstoppable Moms Finalists Week	No
March 13	Kelly Ripa & Michael Strahan	Yes	Emmy Rossum, Deion Sanders, Arthur Chu, LIVE's Search for Unstoppable Moms Finalists Week	No
March 14	Kelly Ripa & Michael Strahan	Yes	Drew Carey, Miss Piggy, LIVE's Search for Unstoppable Moms Finalists Week	No
March 17	Kelly Ripa & Michael Strahan	Yes	Tina Fey, Theo James, Prom Fashion Trends	No
March 18	Kelly Ripa & Michael Strahan	Yes	Usher, Gillian Anderson, John Legend	No
March 24	Michael Strahan & Robin Roberts	Yes	Joan & Melissa Rivers, John Cena, MK Nobilette	No
March 25	Michael Strahan & Maria Menounos	Yes	Zach Braff, Rachel Zoe, Aloe Blacc	No
March 26	Michael Strahan & Maria Menounos	Yes	Jude Law, Christopher Meloni	Yes
March 27	Michael Strahan & Mel B	Yes	Arnold Schwarzenegger, Steven Yeun	No
March 28	Michael Strahan & Kristin Chenoweth	Yes	Russell Crowe, James Van Der Beek	Yes
March 31	Kelly Ripa & Michael Strahan	Yes	Seth Meyers, Cedric the Entertainer, Majesty Rose	Yes

=== April 2014 ===
Date	Co-hosts	"Host chat"	Guests / segments	"Kelly and Michael's Inbox"
April 1	Kelly Ripa & Michael Strahan	Yes	Daniel Radcliffe, Minnie Driver, Nick Cannon	No
April 2	Kelly Ripa & Michael Strahan	Yes	Samuel L. Jackson, Connie Britton, Peter Gros	No
April 3	Kelly Ripa & Michael Strahan	Yes	Anna Chlumsky, Omar Epps	Yes
April 4	Kelly Ripa & Michael Strahan	Yes	James Franco, Poppy Montgomery	No
April 7	Kelly Ripa & Michael Strahan	Yes	Edie Falco, Colin Hanks	Yes
April 8	Kelly Ripa & Michael Strahan	Yes	Anne Hathaway, Brooklyn Decker	Yes
April 9	Kelly Ripa & Michael Strahan	Yes	Kristin Chenoweth, Jeff Perry	Yes
April 10	Kelly Ripa & Michael Strahan	Yes	Kevin Costner, Tracy Morgan	Yes
April 11	Kelly Ripa & Michael Strahan	Yes	Jennifer Garner, Merritt Wever, R5	No
April 14	Kelly Ripa & Michael Strahan	Yes	Jeremy Piven, Malaya Watson, LIVE's New York Auto Show Week – Versatility Vehicles	No
April 15	Kelly Ripa & Michael Strahan	Yes	Billy Bob Thornton, Alicia Silverstone, LIVE's New York Auto Show Week – Environmentally Friendly Vehicles	No
April 16	Kelly Ripa & Michael Strahan	Yes	Nicolas Cage, Whoopi Goldberg, LIVE's New York Auto Show Week – Sport-Utility Vehicles	No
April 17	Kelly Ripa & Michael Strahan	Yes	David Duchovny, Ingrid Michaelson, LIVE's New York Auto Show Week – Sedans	No
April 18	Kelly Ripa & Michael Strahan	Yes	Colin Firth, Margo Martindale, LIVE's New York Auto Show Week – Special Edition Anniversary Models	Yes
April 21	Kelly Ripa & Michael Strahan	Yes	Michelle Obama, Jim Carrey, Christina Hendricks, Debby Ryan, Dexter Roberts	No
April 22	Kelly Ripa & Michael Strahan	Yes	Robin Roberts, Jon Jones	No
April 23	Kelly Ripa & Michael Strahan	Yes	Kate Upton, Paul Wesley, Meb Keflezighi, Neon Trees	No
April 24	Kelly Ripa & Michael Strahan	Yes	Cameron Diaz, Emily VanCamp	No
April 25	Kelly Ripa & Michael Strahan	Yes	Leslie Mann, Christine Baranski, Announcement of Top Teacher Search Semi-Finalists	No
April 28	Kelly Ripa & Michael Strahan	Yes	Andrew Garfield, Nicole Murphy, C.J. Harris	No
April 29	Kelly Ripa & Michael Strahan	Yes	Emma Stone, Keith Urban, Announcement of Top Teacher Search Finalists	Yes
April 30	Kelly Ripa & Michael Strahan	Yes	Lucy Liu, Dane DeHaan	Yes

=== May 2014 ===
Date	Co-hosts	"Host chat"	Guests / segments	"Kelly and Michael's Inbox"
May 1	Kelly Ripa & Michael Strahan	Yes	Kiefer Sutherland, Bellamy Young, David Gray	Yes
May 2	Kelly Ripa & Michael Strahan	Yes	Jamie Foxx, Idina Menzel	Yes
May 5	Kelly Ripa & Michael Strahan	Yes	Zac Efron, Sam Woolf, Moms Week – Kids of New York	Yes
May 6	Kelly Ripa & Michael Strahan	Yes	Neil Patrick Harris, Rick Springfield, Moms Week – Celebrities	No
May 7	Kelly Ripa & Michael Strahan	Yes	Jenny McCarthy, MKTO, Moms Week – Louise Strahan	No
May 8	Kelly Ripa & Michael Strahan	Yes	John Hamm, Roger Goodell, Moms Week – Camilla Consuelos	No
May 9	Kelly Ripa & Michael Strahan	Yes	Zoe Saldaña, John Slattery, Moms Week – Rhoda Gelman	No
May 12	Kelly Ripa & Michael Strahan	Yes	Mark Ruffalo, Jimmy Kimmel, Top Teacher Week – Athena Davis	No
May 13	Kelly Ripa & Michael Strahan	Yes	Matt Bomer, Willie Randolph, Jessica Meuse, Top Teacher Week – John Motchkaviz	No
May 14	Kelly Ripa & Michael Strahan	Yes	Harry Connick Jr., Santana, Top Teacher Week – Wendy Tickel	No
May 15	Kelly Ripa & Michael Strahan	Yes	Drew Barrymore, Theresa Caputo, Top Teacher Week – Stacie Starr	No
May 16	Kelly Ripa & Michael Strahan	Yes	Adam Sandler, Top Teacher Week – Nebojsa "Neb" Stojkovic	No
May 19	Kelly Ripa & Michael Strahan	Yes	Jennifer Lopez, Andi Dorfman, Blondie	No
May 20	Kelly Ripa & Michael Strahan	Yes	Charlize Theron, Josh Hartnett, Stacie Starr Announced as 2014 Top Teacher Winner	No
May 21	Kelly Ripa & Michael Strahan	Yes	Hugh Jackman, Amy Purdy & Derek Hough, Meryl Davis & Maks Chmerkovskiy	No
May 22	Kelly Ripa & Michael Strahan	Yes	Patrick Stewart, Chris O'Dowd, Akhil Rekulapelli	No
May 23	Kelly Ripa & Michael Strahan	Yes	Jennifer Lawrence, Phillip Phillips, Chef Francis Anthony	No
May 26	Kelly Ripa & Michael Strahan	Yes	Clive Owen, Bella Thorne, Lily Allen, LIVE's Top Fitness Instructor Week – Adam Shuty	No
May 27	Kelly Ripa & Michael Strahan	Yes	Howie Mandel, Caleb Johnson, LIVE's Top Fitness Instructor Week – Tammy Harris	No
May 28	Kelly Ripa & Michael Strahan	Yes	Elle Fanning, Jena Irene, LIVE's Top Fitness Instructor Week – Julie Weisman	No
May 29	Kelly Ripa & Michael Strahan	Yes	John Malkovich, Alex Preston, Swapnil Garg, LIVE's Top Fitness Instructor Week – Michael Wollpert	No
May 30	Kelly Ripa & Michael Strahan	Yes	President Barack Obama, LIVE's Top Fitness Instructor Week – Sarah Tiefenthaler, LIVE's Superstar Chefs Farm-to-Table Challenge – Marc Forgione	No

=== June 2014 ===
Date	Co-hosts	"Host chat"	Guests / segments	"Kelly and Michael's Inbox"
June 2	Kelly Ripa & Michael Strahan	Yes	Shailene Woodley, 50 Cent, Ansun Sujoe & Sriram Hathwar	No
June 3	Kelly Ripa & Michael Strahan	Yes	Ricky Gervais, Kendall & Kylie Jenner	Yes
June 4	Kelly Ripa & Michael Strahan	Yes	Jonah Hill, Laura Dern	Yes
June 5	Kelly Ripa & Michael Strahan	Yes	Channing Tatum, Daughtry	No
June 6	Kelly Ripa & Michael Strahan	Yes	Ice Cube, Fran Drescher, LIVE's Superstar Chefs Farm-to-Table Challenge – Guy Fieri	No
June 9	Kelly Ripa & Taye Diggs	Yes	Adam Savage & Jamie Hyneman, Nicki Minaj, Colbie Caillat	No
June 10	Kelly Ripa & Jim Parsons	Yes	Kit Harington, John Lloyd Young, Animals from San Diego Zoo	No
June 11	Kelly Ripa & Anderson Cooper	Yes	America Ferrera, Nia Sanchez, Aretha Franklin	Yes
June 12	Kelly Ripa & Anderson Cooper	Yes	Laurence Fishburne, Taylor Schilling, Martina McBride	No
June 13	Kelly Ripa & Mark Consuelos	Yes	Gerard Butler, Josh Groban, LIVE's Superstar Chefs Farm-to-Table Challenge – Éric Ripert	No
June 16	Kelly Ripa & Michael Strahan	Yes	Jason Biggs, Cher Lloyd, Summer Injuries & Bug Bite Treatment	No
June 17	Kelly Ripa & Michael Strahan	Yes	Jennifer Lopez, Ian Ziering	Yes
June 23	Michael Strahan & Beth Behrs	Yes	Adam Levine, Joe Manganiello	No
June 24	Michael Strahan & Beth Behrs	Yes	Obie the Dachshund, Susan Sarandon, Joel McHale, Nico & Vinz	No
June 25	Michael Strahan & Brooklyn Decker	Yes	Melissa McCarthy, Kawhi Leonard, Susan Boyle	No
June 26	Michael Strahan & Chrissy Teigen	Yes	Tony Goldwyn, Ben Falcone	Yes
June 27	Michael Strahan & Whitney Cummings	Yes	Mark Wahlberg, Michelle Wie, Clip from I Love You, LIVE's Superstar Chefs Farm-to-Table Challenge – Daniel Boulud	No
June 30	Kelly Ripa & Michael Strahan	Yes	Toni Collette, Summer Fun Week – Chris Byrne	Yes

=== July 2014 ===
Date	Co-hosts	"Host chat"	Guests / segments	"Kelly and Michael's Inbox"
July 1	Kelly Ripa & Michael Strahan	Yes	Kelly Osbourne, Summer Fun Week – Joey Chestnut & Sonya Thomas	No
July 2	Kelly Ripa & Michael Strahan	Yes	Liv Tyler, Maia Mitchell, Summer Fun Week – Vern Yip	No
July 3	Kelly Ripa & Michael Strahan	Yes	Pierce Brosnan, Terry O'Quinn, Summer Fun Week – Science Bob	No
July 4	Kelly Ripa & Michael Strahan	Yes	'LIVE's Fourth of July Party': Amy Brenneman, Caroline Rhea, Summer Fun Week – LIVE's Independence Day Games, LIVE's Superstar Chefs Farm-to-Table Challenge – Scott Conant	No
July 7	Kelly Ripa & Michael Strahan	Yes	Nicole Richie, Bernadette Peters	Yes
July 8	Kelly Ripa & Michael Strahan	Yes	Diane Keaton, Keri Russell, O.A.R.	No
July 9	Kelly Ripa & Michael Strahan	Yes	Halle Berry, Florida Georgia Line	Yes
July 10	Kelly Ripa & Michael Strahan	Yes	Justin Theroux, Steven Yeun, Lyle Lovett	No
July 11	Kelly Ripa & Michael Strahan	Yes	Michael Douglas, Colbie Caillat, LIVE's Superstar Chefs Farm-to-Table Challenge – Wylie Dufresne	No
July 14	Kelly Ripa & Michael Strahan	Yes	Eric Dane, Tori Amos, Hot Summer Health Tips	No
July 15	Kelly Ripa & Michael Strahan	Yes	Jason Segel, Willem Dafoe	Yes
July 16	Kelly Ripa & Anderson Cooper	Yes	Zach Braff, Andie MacDowell	Yes
July 17	Kelly Ripa & Michael Strahan	Yes	Cameron Diaz, Mark Feuerstein	No
July 18	Kelly Ripa & Michael Strahan	Yes	Kurt Russell, Stephen Moyer, LIVE's Superstar Chefs Farm-to-Table Challenge – Alton Brown	No
July 21	Kelly Ripa & Michael Strahan	Yes	Dan Aykroyd, Julia Stiles	Yes
July 22	Kelly Ripa & Michael Strahan	Yes	Dwayne Johnson, Sarah McLachlan	No
July 23	Kelly Ripa & Michael Strahan	Yes	Hank Azaria, Jennifer Morrison, Lance Ulanoff	No
July 24	Kelly Ripa & Michael Strahan	Yes	Morgan Freeman, Mira Sorvino, Shawn Mendes	No
July 25	Kelly Ripa & Michael Strahan	Yes	Kelsey Grammer, Kesha, LIVE's Superstar Chefs Farm-to-Table Challenge – Anita Lo	No
July 28	Kelly Ripa & Michael Strahan	Yes	Zoe Saldaña, Bethany Mota	No
July 29	Kelly Ripa & Michael Strahan	Yes	James Franco, Andi Dorfman	Yes
July 30	Kelly Ripa & Michael Strahan	Yes	Heidi Klum, Chris Pratt	Yes
July 31	Kelly Ripa & Michael Strahan	Yes	Martin Lawrence, Dan + Shay	No

=== August 2014 ===
Date	Co-hosts	"Host chat"	Guests / segments	"Kelly and Michael's Inbox"
August 1	Kelly Ripa & Michael Strahan	Yes	Vin Diesel, Maggie Gyllenhaal, LIVE's Superstar Chefs Farm-to-Table Challenge – Jean Georges	No
August 4	Michael Strahan & Maria Menounos	Yes	Daniel Radcliffe, Nina Dobrev, Recap of Michael's Induction Into Pro Football Hall of Fame	No
August 5	Michael Strahan & Maria Menounos	Yes	Helen Mirren, Sean Bean	Yes
August 6	Michael Strahan & Rebecca Romijn	Yes	Katie Holmes, Mark-Paul Gosselaar	Yes
August 7	Michael Strahan & Rebecca Romijn	Yes	Jeff Bridges, Sasha Alexander, Meghan Trainor	No
August 8	Michael Strahan & Kate Upton	Yes	Will Arnett, Nick Cannon	Yes
August 11	Michael Strahan & Brooklyn Decker	Yes	Ethan Hawke, Elisabeth Moss	No
August 12	Michael Strahan & Whitney Cummings	Yes	Jessica Alba, Patrick J. Adams	No

== Season 27 (2014–15) ==
=== September 2014 ===
Date	Co-hosts	"Host chat"	Guests / segments	"Kelly and Michael's Inbox"
September 1	Kelly Ripa & Michael Strahan	Yes	Lea Michele, Dr. Wendy Bazilian – Healthy School Lunches	No
September 2	Kelly Ripa & Michael Strahan	Yes	Mandy Patinkin, David Muir	No
September 3	Kelly Ripa & Michael Strahan	Yes	Liev Schreiber, Jesse Metcalfe, Nick Carter & Jordan Knight	No
September 4	Kelly Ripa & Michael Strahan	Yes	Ray Liotta, Ricky Ubeda, Counting Crows	No
September 5	Kelly Ripa & Michael Strahan	Yes	Kevin Kline, Juliette Lewis, Kelly & Michael Compete in Tough Mudder	No
September 8	Kelly Ripa & Michael Strahan	Yes	Steve Buscemi, Max Greenfield	No
September 9	Kelly Ripa & Michael Strahan	Yes	Jason Bateman, Jenna Dewan-Tatum, Marin Čilić	No
September 10	Kelly Ripa & Michael Strahan	Yes	Ashley Judd, Justin Long	No
September 11	Kelly Ripa & Michael Strahan	Yes	Katharine McPhee, Taraji P. Henson	Yes
September 12	Kelly Ripa & Michael Strahan	Yes	Connie Britton, Mindy Kaling	Yes
September 15	Kelly Ripa & Michael Strahan	Yes	Octavia Spencer, Dylan O'Brien, Lara Spencer	No
September 16	Kelly Ripa & Michael Strahan	Yes	Rose Byrne, Jason Mraz, Kira Kazantsev	Yes
September 17	Kelly Ripa & Michael Strahan	Yes	Julianna Margulies, Jeff Probst, Éric Ripert	No
September 18	Kelly Ripa & Michael Strahan	Yes	Liam Neeson, Tea Leoni, Mat Franco	No
September 19	Kelly Ripa & Michael Strahan	Yes	Tina Fey, Luke Wilson	No
September 22	Kelly Ripa & Michael Strahan	Yes	James Spader, Jim Caviezel, Mary Lambert	No
September 23	Kelly Ripa & Michael Strahan	Yes	Kerry Washington, Bill O'Reilly	No
September 24	Kelly Ripa & Michael Strahan	Yes	Denzel Washington, Rosamund Pike	Yes
September 25	Kelly Ripa & Michael Strahan	Yes	Sofía Vergara, Terry Crews	No
September 26	Kelly Ripa & Michael Strahan	Yes	Andy Samberg, Omar Epps, AJR	No
September 29	Kelly Ripa & Michael Strahan	Yes	Ben Affleck, Bryan Adams	No
September 30	Kelly Ripa & Michael Strahan	Yes	Mark Harmon, Taye Diggs	No

=== October 2014 ===
Date	Co-hosts	"Host chat"	Guests / segments	"Kelly and Michael's Inbox"
October 1	Kelly Ripa & Michael Strahan	Yes	Tyler Perry, Ana Gasteyer	No
October 2	Kelly Ripa & Michael Strahan	Yes	Jennifer Garner, Blake Shelton	No
October 3	Kelly Ripa & Michael Strahan	Yes	Claire Danes, Emily Ratajkowski	Yes
October 6	Kelly Ripa & Michael Strahan	Yes	Matthew Broderick, Ansel Elgort	Yes
October 7	Kelly Ripa & Michael Strahan	Yes	Nathan Lane, Martina McBride, La Roux	No
October 8	Kelly Ripa & Michael Strahan	Yes	Robert Downey Jr., Alan Cumming, Hilary Duff	No
October 9	Kelly Ripa & Michael Strahan	Yes	Steve Carell, Emmy Rossum	No
October 10	Kelly Ripa & Michael Strahan	Yes	Jeremy Renner, Jennifer Morrison	No
October 13	Kelly Ripa & Michael Strahan	Yes	Neil Patrick Harris, Jessie J	No
October 14	Kelly Ripa & Michael Strahan	Yes	Michael Keaton, Minnie Driver	No
October 15	Kelly Ripa & Josh Groban	Yes	Emma Stone, Suzanne Somers, Neon Trees	No
October 16	Kelly Ripa & Mark Consuelos	Yes	Glenn Close, Julianne Hough, Paloma Faith	No
October 17	Kelly Ripa & David Muir	Yes	Bridget Moynahan, Jason Schwartzman, Tony Gemignani	No
October 20	Kelly Ripa & Michael Strahan	Yes	Naomi Watts, Jenny McCarthy	No
October 21	Kelly Ripa & Michael Strahan	Yes	Keanu Reeves, Tom Cavanagh, Kiesza	No
October 22	Kelly Ripa & Michael Strahan	Yes	Hugh Jackman, Danai Gurira	No
October 23	Kelly Ripa & Michael Strahan	Yes	Mark Consuelos, Jessica Capshaw, Annie Lennox	No
October 24	Kelly Ripa & Michael Strahan	Yes	Howie Mandel, Ginnifer Goodwin	No
October 27	Kelly Ripa & Michael Strahan	Yes	Emma Thompson, Stanley Tucci	Yes
October 28	Kelly Ripa & Michael Strahan	Yes	Amy Poehler, Joey McIntyre, Top Halloween Moments	Yes
October 29	Kelly Ripa & Michael Strahan	Yes	Lucy Liu, Deion Sanders, Top Halloween Moments	Yes
October 30	Kelly Ripa & Michael Strahan	Yes	Rene Russo, Caroline Wozniacki, Sam Hunt	No
October 31	Kelly Ripa & Michael Strahan	Yes	'LIVE's Best Halloween Show Ever... Seriously'	No

=== November 2014 ===
Date	Co-hosts	"Host chat"	Guests / segments	"Kelly and Michael's Inbox"
November 3	Kelly Ripa & Michael Strahan	Yes	Jessica Chastain, Michael C. Hall, LIVE's Paw-fect Pet Week	No
November 4	Kelly Ripa & Michael Strahan	Yes	Matthew McConaughey Felicity Jones, LIVE's Paw-fect Pet Week	No
November 5	Kelly Ripa & Michael Strahan	Yes	Anne Hathaway, Kristen Johnston, LIVE's Paw-fect Pet Week	No
November 6	Kelly Ripa & Michael Strahan	Yes	Jeff Daniels, Eddie Redmayne, LIVE's Paw-fect Pet Week	No
November 7	Kelly Ripa & Michael Strahan	Yes	Beth Behrs, Bette Midler, LIVE's Paw-fect Pet Week	No
November 10	Kelly Ripa & Michael Strahan	Yes	Ewan McGregor, Ioan Gruffudd	No
November 11	Kelly Ripa & Michael Strahan	Yes	Alicia Keys, Andy Cohen, Shawn Mendes	No
November 12	Kelly Ripa & Michael Strahan	Yes	Josh Hutcherson, Anjelica Huston, Aretha Franklin	No
November 13	Kelly Ripa & Michael Strahan	Yes	Channing Tatum, Estelle	No
November 14	Kelly Ripa & Michael Strahan	Yes	Liam Hemsworth, Katherine Heigl, Tony Robbins	Yes
November 17	Kelly Ripa & Michael Strahan	Yes	Benedict Cumberbatch, Allison Janney	Yes
November 18	Kelly Ripa & Michael Strahan	Yes	Keira Knightley, Charlie Day, Kevin Harvick	No
November 19	Kelly Ripa & Michael Strahan	Yes	Russell Brand, Matt Czuchry, Katie Brown	No
November 20	Kelly Ripa & Michael Strahan	Yes	Mark Ruffalo, Kristin Chenoweth, Thanksgiving Tips	Yes
November 21	Kelly Ripa & Michael Strahan	Yes	Kate Walsh, Anna Camp, Kelly Cooks, Thanksgiving Tips	No
November 24	Kelly Ripa & Michael Strahan	Yes	Tim Allen, Ben McKenzie, Michael Cooks at Telepan	No
November 25	Kelly Ripa & Michael Strahan	Yes	John Goodman, Russell Brand Learns About Thanksgiving, Thanksgiving Tips	Yes
November 26	Kelly Ripa & Michael Strahan	Yes	Taylor Swift, Marie Haycox	No
November 28	Kelly Ripa & Michael Strahan	Yes	Craig Ferguson, Diane von Furstenberg, Jessie J	No

=== December 2014 ===
Date	Co-hosts	"Host chat"	Guests / segments	"Kelly and Michael's Inbox"
December 1	Kelly Ripa & Michael Strahan	Yes	Chris Rock, Alfre Woodard, LIVE's Holiday Gift Guide – Amy Astley	No
December 2	Kelly Ripa & Michael Strahan	Yes	Seth MacFarlane, Gabrielle Union, LIVE's Holiday Gift Guide – Carley Roney	Yes
December 3	Kelly Ripa & Michael Strahan	Yes	Meryl Streep, Laura Dern, LIVE's Holiday Gift Guide – Lawrence Zarian	No
December 4	Kelly Ripa & Michael Strahan	Yes	Rosario Dawson, LIVE's Holiday Gift Guide – Chris Byrne	No
December 5	Kelly Ripa & Michael Strahan	Yes	Jake Gyllenhaal, Megan Boone, LIVE's Holiday Gift Guide – Lance Ulanoff	No
December 8	Kelly Ripa & Michael Strahan	Yes	Cameron Diaz, Nick Cannon, LIVE's Holiday Hits Week – Renee Fleming	No
December 9	Kelly Ripa & Michael Strahan	Yes	Joaquin Phoenix, Anna Kendrick, LIVE's Holiday Hits Week – Sara Evans	Yes
December 10	Kelly Ripa & Michael Strahan	Yes	Ricky Gervais, Austin Mahone, LIVE's Holiday Hits Week – Johnnyswim	Yes
December 11	Kelly Ripa & Michael Strahan	Yes	Jamie Foxx, Jeffrey Tambor, LIVE's Holiday Hits Week – Anthony Hamilton	No
December 12	Kelly Ripa & Michael Strahan	Yes	Mark Wahlberg, LIVE's Holiday Hits Week – Idina Menzel	Yes
December 15	Kelly Ripa & Michael Strahan	Yes	Amy Adams, Larry the Cable Guy	Yes
December 16	Kelly Ripa & Michael Strahan	Yes	Chris Pine, David Oyelowo	Yes
December 17	Kelly Ripa & Michael Strahan	Yes	Nene Leakes, Quvenzhané Wallis	Yes
December 18	Kelly Ripa & Michael Strahan	Yes	Oprah Winfrey, Christoph Waltz	No
December 19	Kelly Ripa & Michael Strahan	Yes	Emily Blunt, Rupert Friend, Harlem Globetrotters	No
December 22	Kelly Ripa & Michael Strahan	Yes	Reese Witherspoon, Christine Baranski, LIVE's Year-End Look Back Challenge	Yes
December 23	Kelly Ripa & Michael Strahan	Yes	Sting, Nick Jonas, LIVE's Year-End Look Back Challenge	No
December 24	Kelly Ripa & Michael Strahan	Yes	'LIVE's Cozy Christmas Eve': Dwayne Johnson, Caroline Rhea, Disney on Ice, Earth, Wind & Fire, Santa	No
December 26	Kelly Ripa & Michael Strahan	Yes	Denzel Washington, Bradley Cooper, Shawn Mendes, LIVE's Year-End Look Back Challenge	No
December 29	Kelly Ripa & Michael Strahan	Yes	'LIVE's Year End Viewers' Choice Show'	No

=== January 2015 ===
Date	Co-hosts	"Host chat"	Guests / segments	"Kelly and Michael's Inbox"
January 5	Kelly Ripa & Michael Strahan	Yes	Taraji P. Henson, Chris Soules, Kick Start the New Year: Fitness Edition – Dolvett Quince	No
January 6	Kelly Ripa & Michael Strahan	Yes	Jessica Lange, Lucy Hale, Kick Start the New Year: Fitness Edition – Chris Powell	No
January 7	Kelly Ripa & Michael Strahan	Yes	Forest Whitaker, J. K. Simmons, Kick Start the New Year: Fitness Edition – Shaun T	No
January 8	Kelly Ripa & Michael Strahan	Yes	Liam Neeson, Matt LeBlanc, Kick Start the New Year: Fitness Edition – Jessie Pavelka	No
January 9	Kelly Ripa & Michael Strahan	Yes	Lena Dunham, Victoria Justice, Kick Start the New Year: Fitness Edition – Chalene Johnson	No
January 12	Kelly Ripa & Michael Strahan	Yes	Patricia Heaton, Hugh Bonneville, Kick Start the New Year: Nutrition Edition – Dr. Loren Cordain	No
January 13	Kelly Ripa & Michael Strahan	Yes	Chris Hemsworth, Ella Henderson, Kick Start the New Year: Nutrition Edition – Dr. Joel Fuhrman	No
January 14	Kelly Ripa & Michael Strahan	Yes	Julianne Moore, Angela Bassett, Kick Start the New Year: Nutrition Edition – Nina Teicholz	No
January 15	Kelly Ripa & Anderson Cooper	Yes	Bradley Cooper, Olivia Munn, Kick Start the New Year: Nutrition Edition – Dr. David Perlmutter	No
January 16	Kelly Ripa & Michael Strahan	Yes	Nicole Kidman, Sienna Miller, Train, Kick Start the New Year: Nutrition Edition – Dr. Wendy Bazilian	No
January 19	Kelly Ripa & Michael Strahan	Yes	Jennifer Lopez, Kick Start the New Year – Shawn Achor	No
January 20	Kelly Ripa & Michael Strahan	Yes	Anne Hathaway, Taylor Schilling, New Kids on the Block, Kick Start the New Year – Daniel Hsu	No
January 21	Kelly Ripa & Michael Strahan	Yes	Jude Law, Allison Williams, Kick Start the New Year – Dr. Richard Besser	No
January 22	Kelly Ripa & Michael Strahan	Yes	Don Cheadle, Simon Helberg, Kick Start the New Year – Michael Breus	No
January 23	Kelly Ripa & Michael Strahan	Yes	Ryan Seacrest, Fall Out Boy, Kick Start the New Year – Dr. Greg Yapalater	No
January 26	Kelly Ripa & Michael Strahan	Yes	Kristen Stewart, Grant Gustin	Yes
January 28	Kelly Ripa & Michael Strahan	Yes	Donald Trump, Katherine Jenkins	Yes
January 29	Kelly Ripa & Michael Strahan	Yes	Joanne Froggatt, Tony Goldwyn, Paulina Vega	No
January 30	Kelly Ripa & Michael Strahan	Yes	Antonio Banderas, Ruth Wilson, Toma Dobrosavljevic	No

=== February 2015 ===
Date	Co-hosts	"Host chat"	Guests / segments	"Kelly and Michael's Inbox"
February 2	Kelly Ripa & Michael Strahan	Yes	Jeff Bridges, Busy Philipps, Diana Krall	Yes
February 3	Kelly Ripa & Michael Strahan	Yes	Glenn Close, Matthew Rhys	Yes
February 4	Kelly Ripa & Michael Strahan	Yes	David Duchovny, Leeza Gibbons, Lance Ulanoff	No
February 5	Kelly Ripa & Michael Strahan	Yes	Ryan Reynolds, Bob Odenkirk	No
February 6	Kelly Ripa & Michael Strahan	Yes	Seth Meyers, Rob Gronkowski, Adam Savage & Jamie Hyneman	No
February 9	Kelly Ripa & Michael Strahan	Yes	Samuel L. Jackson, Christina Perri	No
February 10	Kelly Ripa & Michael Strahan	Yes	Colin Firth, Patricia Arquette, Julian Edelman	No
February 11	Kelly Ripa & Michael Strahan	Yes	Hugh Grant, Terrence Howard	Yes
February 12	Kelly Ripa & Michael Strahan	Yes	Dakota Johnson, Shaquille O'Neal	No
February 13	Kelly Ripa & Michael Strahan	Yes	Jamie Dornan, Dale Earnhardt Jr., Katie Brown	No
February 16	Kelly Ripa & Michael Strahan	Yes	William H. Macy, Rainn Wilson, LIVE's Oscar Countdown: Audience Challenge	No
February 17	Kelly Ripa & Michael Strahan	Yes	Dylan McDermott, Angie Harmon, LIVE's Oscar Countdown: Audience Challenge	No
February 18	Kelly Ripa & Michael Strahan	Yes	Mary J. Blige, Travis Fimmel, LIVE's Oscar Countdown: Audience Challenge	No
February 19	Kelly Ripa & Michael Strahan	Yes	Matthew Perry, Mae Whitman, LIVE's Oscar Countdown: Audience Challenge	No
February 20	Kelly Ripa & Michael Strahan	Yes	'LIVE's Pre-Oscar Celebration': Kevin Costner, Oscar Memories, Look Back at Past Oscar Hosts, LIVE's After Oscar Show Recap	Yes
February 23	Kelly Ripa & Michael Strahan	Yes	'LIVE! with Kelly and Michael After Oscar Show': Dancing with the Stars Dancers, Neil Patrick Harris, Flo Rida, Maria Menounos, Carson Kressley, Lawrence Zarian	No
February 24	Kelly Ripa & Michael Strahan	Yes	Martin Short, Anthony Anderson, After Oscar Show Recap	Yes
February 25	Kelly Ripa & Michael Strahan	Yes	Josh Duhamel, Lisa Rinna, Chris Byrne	No
February 26	Kelly Ripa & Michael Strahan	Yes	Ryan Phillipe, Will Forte, MisterWives	Yes
February 27	Kelly Ripa & Michael Strahan	Yes	Jason Biggs, Lana Parrilla, Echosmith	No

=== March 2015 ===
Date	Co-hosts	"Host chat"	Guests / segments	"Kelly and Michael's Inbox"
March 2	Kelly Ripa & Michael Strahan	Yes	Kevin Bacon, Juliette Lewis, LIVE's Healthy Hearty Cooking Week – Daniel Boulud	No
March 3	Kelly Ripa & Michael Strahan	Yes	Sigourney Weaver, Ansel Elgort, LIVE's Healthy Hearty Cooking Week – Dr. Ian Smith	No
March 4	Kelly Ripa & Michael Strahan	Yes	Felicity Huffman, Theresa Caputo, LIVE's Healthy Hearty Cooking Week – Dr. Joel Fuhrman	No
March 5	Kelly Ripa & Michael Strahan	Yes	Hugh Jackman, Peter Gros, Henrik Lundqvist, LIVE's Healthy Hearty Cooking Week – Éric Ripert	No
March 6	Kelly Ripa & Michael Strahan	Yes	Jada Pinkett Smith, Ginnifer Goodwin, Rixton	No
March 9	Kelly Ripa & Michael Strahan	Yes	Liam Neeson, Lily James, Chelsea Clinton	No
March 10	Kelly Ripa & Michael Strahan	Yes	Elizabeth Hurley, Richard Madden, Chris Soules	No
March 11	Kelly Ripa & Michael Strahan	Yes	Common, Abbi Jacobson, Olly Murs	No
March 12	Kelly Ripa & Michael Strahan	Yes	Ethan Hawke, Elisabeth Moss, Mike Tyson	No
March 13	Kelly Ripa & Michael Strahan	Yes	Steve Martin; Bruno Tonioli, Carrie Ann Inaba & Julianne Hough; Sheppard	No
March 16	Michael Strahan & Taraji P. Henson	Yes	Shailene Woodley, Jerry O'Connell	No
March 17	Michael Strahan & Emmy Rossum	Yes	Theo James, Kyle Chandler	No
March 18	Michael Strahan & Erin Andrews	Yes	Will Ferrell, Derek Hough	No
March 19	Michael Strahan & Erin Andrews	Yes	Kevin Hart, Carey Mulligan	No
March 20	Michael Strahan & Whitney Cummings	Yes	Octavia Spencer, Plain White T's, Dog Grooming with Andrea Arden	No
March 23	Michael Strahan & Maria Menounos	Yes	Ben Stiller, Prom Fashion Trends	No
March 24	Kelly Ripa & Michael Strahan	Yes	Julie Andrews, Zoë Kravitz	No
March 30	Kelly Ripa & Jerry O'Connell	Yes	Sissy Spacek, Billy Gardell, LIVE's Auto Show Week – Convertibles	No
March 31	Kelly Ripa & Mark Cuban	Yes	Helen Mirren, Charlotte McKinney & Keo Motsepe, LIVE's Auto Show Week – Luxury Vehicles	No

=== April 2015 ===
Date	Co-hosts	"Host chat"	Guests / segments	"Kelly and Michael's Inbox"
April 1	Kelly Ripa & Mark Consuelos	Yes	Pharrell Williams, Vanessa Hudgens, LIVE's Auto Show Week – Concept Cars	No
April 2	Kelly Ripa & Mark Consuelos	Yes	Timothy Hutton, Chrissy Teigen, LIVE's Auto Show Week – SUVs and Crossovers	No
April 3	Kelly Ripa & David Duchovny	Yes	Jordana Brewster, Ciara, LIVE's Auto Show Week – Sedans	No
April 6	Kelly Ripa & Michael Strahan	Yes	Michelle Obama, Connie Britton, Anthony Anderson, Caroline Wozniacki, Jeff Gordon	No
April 7	Kelly Ripa & Michael Strahan	Yes	Jon Cryer, Jane Lynch, Michael Sam & Peta Murgatroyd	No
April 8	Kelly Ripa & Michael Strahan	Yes	Edie Falco, Kat Dennings, Science Bob	No
April 9	Kelly Ripa & Michael Strahan	Yes	Kit Harington, Scott Eastwood, Johnnyswim	No
April 10	Kelly Ripa & Michael Strahan	Yes	Candice Bergen, Nikolaj Coster-Waldau, Qaasim Middleton	No
April 13	Kelly Ripa & Michael Strahan	Yes	Kevin James, Oscar Isaac, Fifth Harmony	No
April 14	Kelly Ripa & Michael Strahan	Yes	Matthew Morrison, Pauley Perrette, Suzanne Somers & Tony Dovolani	No
April 15	Kelly Ripa & Michael Strahan	Yes	Nathan Lane, David Burtka, Vance Joy	No
April 16	Kelly Ripa & Michael Strahan	Yes	John Slattery, Anna Chlumsky	Yes
April 17	Kelly Ripa & Michael Strahan	Yes	Patricia Arquette, James Purefoy, Peter Gros	No
April 20	Kelly Ripa & Michael Strahan	Yes	LL Cool J, Rachael Ray, Joey Cook	No
April 21	Kelly Ripa & Michael Strahan	Yes	Blake Lively, James Oseland, Announcement of Top Teacher Finalists	Yes
April 22	Kelly Ripa & Michael Strahan	Yes	Russell Crowe, Hayden Panettiere	No
April 23	Kelly Ripa & Michael Strahan	Yes	Kelsey Grammer, Guillermo Díaz	Yes
April 24	Kelly Ripa & Michael Strahan	Yes	Robert Downey Jr., Diane Sawyer, Quentin Alexander	No
April 27	Michael Strahan & Robin Roberts	Yes	James Spader, Nene Leakes	No
April 28	Kelly Ripa & Michael Strahan	Yes	Mark Ruffalo, Jonny Lee Miller, Who Is Fancy	No
April 29	Kelly Ripa & Michael Strahan	Yes	Josh Groban, Cobie Smulders	No
April 30	Kelly Ripa & Michael Strahan	Yes	Jeff Perry, Kate McKinnon, Magic!	No

=== May 2015 ===
Date	Co-hosts	"Host chat"	Guests / segments	"Kelly and Michael's Inbox"
May 1	Kelly Ripa & Michael Strahan	Yes	Helen Hunt, Kunal Nayyar, Tyanna Jones	No
May 4	Kelly Ripa & Michael Strahan	Yes	Elizabeth Banks, Darren Criss, Top Teacher Week – Lori Killino	No
May 5	Kelly Ripa & Michael Strahan	Yes	Kristin Chenoweth, Lily Tomlin, Top Teacher Week – Tal Thompson	No
May 6	Kelly Ripa & Michael Strahan	Yes	Reese Witherspoon, Chris Soules & Witney Carson, Top Teacher Week – Donn Harrison	No
May 7	Kelly Ripa & Michael Strahan	Yes	John Legend, Bellamy Young, Top Teacher Week – Kristie Downing	No
May 8	Kelly Ripa & Michael Strahan	Yes	Jim Parsons, Trisha Yearwood, Kelly & Michael Interview Kids about Mother's Day, Top Teacher Week – Donn Harrison Announced as Winner	No
May 11	Kelly Ripa & Michael Strahan	Yes	Charlize Theron, Tom Brokaw, Kevin Liu	No
May 12	Kelly Ripa & Michael Strahan	Yes	Rebel Wilson, Rosie Huntington-Whitely, Kelli O'Hara & Cast of The King and I	Yes
May 13	Kelly Ripa & Michael Strahan	Yes	Jane Fonda, Tatiana Maslany, Nastia Luikin & Derek Hough	No
May 14	Kelly Ripa & Michael Strahan	Yes	Matt Dillon, Anna Camp, David Duchovny	No
May 15	Kelly Ripa & Michael Strahan	Yes	Queen Latifah, Alex Trebek	No
May 18	Kelly Ripa & Michael Strahan	Yes	'LIVE! at Disneyland Resort': The Cast of Frozen, Christina Aguilera, Riker Lynch & Allison Holker, History of Disneyland, LIVE's Anniversary Games – Day 1	No
May 19	Kelly Ripa & Michael Strahan	Yes	'LIVE! at Disneyland Resort': Jimmy Kimmel, Scott Foley, Nick Fradiani, The Cast of Cars, LIVE's Anniversary Games – Day 2	No
May 20	Kelly Ripa & Michael Strahan	Yes	'LIVE! at Disneyland Resort': Patricia Heaton, James Van Der Beek, Ne-Yo, Kelly Visits World of Color, LIVE's Anniversary Games – Day 3	No
May 21	Kelly Ripa & Michael Strahan	Yes	'LIVE! at Disneyland Resort': Dwayne Johnson, Disneyland Memories, LIVE's Anniversary Games – Day 4	No
May 22	Kelly Ripa & Michael Strahan	Yes	'LIVE! at Disneyland Resort': Mariah Carey, Michael Explores Cars Land, LIVE's Anniversary Games – Day 5	No
May 25	Kelly Ripa & Michael Strahan	Yes	Kim Kardashian West, Ray Liotta, Kevin McKidd	No
May 26	Kelly Ripa & Michael Strahan	Yes	Kevin Dillon, Jennifer Arnold & Bill Klein, Clark Beckham, LIVE's Fitness Countdown	No
May 27	Kelly Ripa & Michael Strahan	Yes	Kevin Conolly, Paula Abdul, LIVE's Fitness Countdown	No
May 28	Kelly Ripa & Michael Strahan	Yes	Adrian Grenier, Joan Jett & the Blackhearts, LIVE's Fitness Countdown	No
May 29	Kelly Ripa & Michael Strahan	Yes	Jeremy Piven, Carla Gugino, LIVE's Fitness Countdown, Winner of Fitspiration Photo Contest, LIVE's Search for America's Next Grill Star	No

=== June 2015 ===
Date	Co-hosts	"Host chat"	Guests / segments	"Kelly and Michael's Inbox"
June 1	Kelly Ripa & Michael Strahan	Yes	James Corden, Bryce Dallas Howard, Gokul Venkatachalam & Vanya Shivashankar	No
June 2	Kelly Ripa & Michael Strahan	Yes	Jesse Tyler Ferguson, Ross Lynch, Animals from San Diego Zoo	No
June 3	Kelly Ripa & Michael Strahan	Yes	Jason Statham, Robert Duvall, Barenaked Ladies	No
June 4	Kelly Ripa & Michael Strahan	Yes	Jude Law, Jeff Gordon, Lifehouse	Yes
June 5	Kelly Ripa & Michael Strahan	Yes	Ricky Martin, Rose Byrne, LIVE's Search for America's New Grill Star Finalist	No
June 8	Kelly Ripa & Michael Strahan	Yes	Molly Shannon, Hugh Dancy	No
June 9	Kelly Ripa & Michael Strahan	Yes	Hugh Jackman, Victor Espinoza, American Authors	No
June 10	Kelly Ripa & Michael Strahan	Yes	50 Cent, Ali Wentworth	No
June 11	Kelly Ripa & Michael Strahan	Yes	Jason Alexander, Joe Jonas, Katharine McPhee	No
June 12	Kelly Ripa & Michael Strahan	Yes	Melissa McCarthy, Josh Hartnett, LIVE's Search for America's New Grill Star Finalist	No
June 15	Michael Strahan & Erin Andrews	Yes	Taylor Schilling, Alan Rickman	Yes
June 16	Michael Strahan & Erin Andrews	Yes	Eric Dane, Uzo Aduba, Behind-the-Scenes of Magic Mike XXL	No
June 17	Michael Strahan & Emmy Rossum	Yes	Mark Ruffalo, James Taylor, Chris Byrne	No
June 18	Michael Strahan & Busy Philipps	Yes	Holly Hunter, Laverne Cox, Hilary Duff	No
June 19	Michael Strahan & NeNe Leakes	Yes	Colin Farrell, Adam Lambert, LIVE's Search for America's New Grill Star Finalist	No
June 22	Kelly Ripa & Michael Strahan	Yes	Joe Manganiello, Deion Sanders, LIVE's Social Countdown – Facebook	No
June 23	Kelly Ripa & Michael Strahan	Yes	Matt Bomer, Laura Prepon, LIVE's Social Countdown – Instagram	No
June 24	Kelly Ripa & Michael Strahan	Yes	Channing Tatum, Fifth Harmony, LIVE's Social Countdown – Vine	No
June 25	Kelly Ripa & Michael Strahan	Yes	Robert Downey Jr., Chris Pratt, LIVE's Social Countdown – AOL.com	No
June 26	Kelly Ripa & Michael Strahan	Yes	Liam Neeson, Jim Parsons, Rixton, LIVE's Social Countdown – YouTube	No
June 29	Kelly Ripa & Michael Strahan	Yes	Denis Leary, Tori Kelly, LIVE's Stars and Stripes Games	No
June 30	Kelly Ripa & Michael Strahan	Yes	Jon Hamm, Jason Derulo, LIVE's Stars and Stripes Games	Yes

=== July 2015 ===
Date	Co-hosts	"Host chat"	Guests / segments	"Kelly and Michael's Inbox"
July 1	Kelly Ripa & Michael Strahan	Yes	Amy Poehler, Miguel, LIVE's Stars and Stripes Games	No
July 2	Kelly Ripa & Michael Strahan	Yes	Marg Helgenberger, Jennifer Morrison, LIVE's Stars and Stripes Games	No
July 3	Kelly Ripa & Michael Strahan	Yes	'LIVE's Stars and Stripes Celebration': Josh Groban, LIVE's Search for America's New Grill Star Finalist, LIVE's Stars and Stripes Games	No
July 6	Kelly Ripa & Michael Strahan	Yes	Taye Diggs, Melissa Leo, Summer Health Tips, LIVE's Just Kidding Week	No
July 7	Kelly Ripa & Michael Strahan	Yes	Ryan Reynolds, Bernadette Peters, LIVE's Just Kidding Week	No
July 8	Kelly Ripa & Michael Strahan	Yes	Laura Linney, Jane Lynch, LIVE's Just Kidding Week	No
July 9	Kelly Ripa & Michael Strahan	Yes	Carli Lloyd, Kyle MacLachlan, Rachel Platten, LIVE's Just Kidding Week	No
July 10	Kelly Ripa & Michael Strahan	Yes	Nick & Drew Lachey, LIVE's Search for America's New Grill Star Finalist, LIVE's Just Kidding Week	No
July 13	Kelly Ripa & Michael Strahan	Yes	Ian McKellen, Ryan Seacrest, O.A.R.	No
July 14	Kelly Ripa & Michael Strahan	Yes	Michael Douglas, John Cena	No
July 15	Kelly Ripa & Michael Strahan	Yes	Paul Rudd, Bill Hader, Shawn Mendes	No
July 16	Kelly Ripa & Michael Strahan	Yes	Amy Schumer, R5	No
July 17	Kelly Ripa & Michael Strahan	Yes	Ben Kingsley, Cast of An American in Paris, LIVE's Search for America's New Grill Star Finalist	No
July 20	Kelly Ripa & Michael Strahan	Yes	Kevin James, Bo Derek, Jill Scott	No
July 21	Kelly Ripa & Michael Strahan	Yes	Adam Sandler, Cara Delevingne, Silento	No
July 22	Kelly Ripa & Michael Strahan	Yes	Katie Holmes, Jane Krakowski, MKTO	No
July 23	Kelly Ripa & Michael Strahan	Yes	Jake Gyllenhaal, Ashley Benson, Dr. Wendy Bazilian	Yes
July 24	Kelly Ripa & Michael Strahan	Yes	Christina Applegate, Josh Gad, LIVE's Search for America's New Grill Star Finalist	No
July 27	Kelly Ripa & Michael Strahan	Yes	Jeremy Renner, Dove Cameron, LIVE's Picture Perfect Makeover Week	No
July 28	Kelly Ripa & Michael Strahan	Yes	Parker Posey, Kaitlyn Bristowe, LIVE's Picture Perfect Makeover Week	Yes
July 29	Kelly Ripa & Michael Strahan	Yes	Ed Helms, Joss Stone, LIVE's Picture Perfect Makeover Week	No
July 30	Kelly Ripa & Michael Strahan	Yes	David Muir, Leona Lewis, LIVE's Picture Perfect Makeover Week	No
July 31	Kelly Ripa & Michael Strahan	Yes	Kevin Bacon, Elle King, LIVE's Picture Perfect Makeover Week	No

=== August 2015 ===
Date	Co-hosts	"Host chat"	Guests / segments	"Kelly and Michael's Inbox"
August 3	Kelly Ripa & Michael Strahan	Yes	Meryl Streep, Michael B. Jordan	No
August 4	Kelly Ripa & Michael Strahan	Yes	Jason Segel, Kate Mara	Yes
August 5	Kelly Ripa & Michael Strahan	Yes	Salma Hayek, Mamie Gummer	No
August 6	Kelly Ripa & Michael Strahan	Yes	Miles Teller, Rick Springfield	Yes
August 7	Kelly Ripa & Michael Strahan	Yes	Alexander Skarsgard, Peter Facinelli, LIVE's Search for America's New Grill Star Finalists Announced	No
August 10	Michael Strahan & Ciara	Yes	Henry Cavill, LIVE's Summer School Week – Double Dutch	No
August 11	Michael Strahan & Lucy Liu	Yes	Armie Hammer, LIVE's Summer School Week – Scrambled Eggs with Chopsticks	No
August 12	Michael Strahan & Busy Philipps	Yes	Heidi Klum, Brad Keselowski, LIVE's Summer School Week – Building Terrariums	No
August 13	Michael Strahan & Busy Philipps	Yes	Connie Britton, Rupert Friend, LIVE's Summer School Week – Cheeseburger Cupcakes	No
August 14	Michael Strahan & Sara Haines	Yes	Zachary Quinto, LIVE's Search for America's New Grill Star Finalists Compete, LIVE's Summer School Week – Basketball Drills	No
August 17	Michael Strahan & Jane Lynch	Yes	Kristen Stewart, Oscar Isaac	No
August 18	Michael Strahan & Ana Gasteyer	Yes	Howie Mandel, Patricia Clarkson, R5	No

== Season 28 (2015–16) ==
Episodes starting May 16, 2016, was rebranded as LIVE! with Kelly.

=== September 2015 ===
Date	Co-hosts	"Host chat"	Guests / segments	"Kelly and Michael's Inbox"
September 7	Kelly Ripa & Michael Strahan	Yes	Mel B, Kunal Nayyar, Shawn Mendes	No
September 8	Kelly Ripa & Michael Strahan	Yes	Tyra Banks, Hank Azaria, LIVE's We Said Whaaat? Week – Kelly Raises Chickens	No
September 9	Kelly Ripa & Michael Strahan	Yes	Craig Ferguson, Kate Bosworth, LIVE's We Said Whaaat? Week – Michael Faces Snakes	No
September 10	Kelly Ripa & Michael Strahan	Yes	Steven Tyler, Chrissy Teigen, Lauren Williams, LIVE's We Said Whaaat? Week – Kelly Tries Cryotherapy	No
September 11	Kelly Ripa & Michael Strahan	Yes	Ben McKenzie, Billy Gardell, LIVE's We Said Whaaat? Week – Michael Cooks Breakfast	No
September 14	Kelly Ripa & Michael Strahan	Yes	Novak Djokovic, Neil Patrick Harris, Chris Harrison, Russell Westbrook	No
September 15	Kelly Ripa & Michael Strahan	Yes	Carol Burnett, Dylan O'Brien, Betty Cantrell	No
September 16	Kelly Ripa & Michael Strahan	Yes	Benicio Del Toro, Gaby Diaz, Brett Eldredge	Yes
September 17	Kelly Ripa & Michael Strahan	Yes	Andy Samberg, Naomi Watts, Paul Zerdin	No
September 18	Kelly Ripa & Anderson Cooper	Yes	Richard Gere, Colin Hanks, School Pictures Dos and Don'ts	No
September 21	Kelly Ripa & Michael Strahan	Yes	Ryan Reynolds, Scott Bakula, Yo-Yo Ma	No
September 22	Kelly Ripa & Michael Strahan	Yes	Keke Palmer, Terrence Howard, Stephen Curry	No
September 23	Kelly Ripa & Michael Strahan	Yes	Anne Hathaway, Trevor Noah	Yes
September 24	Kelly Ripa & Michael Strahan	Yes	Kerry Washington, Bill O'Reilly	No
September 25	Kelly Ripa & Michael Strahan	Yes	Don Johnson, Priyanka Chopra	Yes
September 28	Kelly Ripa & Michael Strahan	Yes	Rob Lowe, Hayden Panettiere	Yes
September 29	Kelly Ripa & Michael Strahan	Yes	Joseph Gordon-Levitt, Cindy Crawford, Dr. Wendy Bazilian	No
September 30	Kelly Ripa & Michael Strahan	Yes	Julianna Margulies, Ariana Grande, Amy Robach	No

=== October 2015 ===
Date	Co-hosts	"Host chat"	Guests / segments	"Kelly and Michael's Inbox"
October 1	Kelly Ripa & Michael Strahan	Yes	Julianne Moore, Kate McKinnon, Rumer Willis	No
October 2	Kelly Ripa & Michael Strahan	Yes	Idris Elba, Ken Jeong, Peter Gros	No
October 5	Kelly Ripa & Michael Strahan	Yes	Hugh Jackman, Shay Mitchell	No
October 6	Kelly Ripa & Michael Strahan	Yes	Sarah Michelle Gellar, Shaquille O'Neal	Yes
October 7	Kelly Ripa & Michael Strahan	Yes	Rooney Mara, Gina Rodriguez, Abby Wambach	No
October 8	Kelly Ripa & Michael Strahan	Yes	Seth Rogen, Billy Eichner, The Vamps	Yes
October 9	Kelly Ripa & Michael Strahan	Yes	Kate Winslet, Ted Danson, Sara Bareilles	No
October 12	Kelly Ripa & Michael Strahan	Yes	Clive Owen, Jussie Smollett, Ronda Rousey	No
October 13	Michael Strahan & Ciara	Yes	Gabrielle Union, LIVE's Pump Up Your Pumpkin	No
October 14	Kelly Ripa & Michael Strahan	Yes	Tom Hanks, Carey Mulligan	No
October 15	Kelly Ripa & Michael Strahan	Yes	Tom Selleck, Jennifer Carpenter, Andra Day	Yes
October 16	Kelly Ripa & Michael Strahan	Yes	Jack Black, Amy Brenneman	No
October 19	Kelly Ripa & Michael Strahan	Yes	Jimmy Kimmel, Robin Thicke, LIVE's Superstar Chef Challenge – Daniel Boulud	No
October 20	Kelly Ripa & Michael Strahan	Yes	Vin Diesel, Amanda Peet, LIVE's Superstar Chef Challenge – Alfred Portale	No
October 21	Kelly Ripa & Michael Strahan	Yes	Michael J. Fox, Sarah Paulson, LIVE's Superstar Chef Challenge – Alex Guarnaschelli	Yes
October 22	Kelly Ripa & Michael Strahan	Yes	Patricia Heaton, Ed Westwick, LIVE's Superstar Chef Challenge – Marc Forgione	Yes
October 23	Kelly Ripa & Michael Strahan	Yes	Kate Hudson, Kat Dennings, America's Biggest Pumpkin, LIVE's Superstar Chef Challenge – Éric Ripert	No
October 26	Kelly Ripa & Michael Strahan	Yes	Stanley Tucci, Wesley Snipes	Yes
October 27	Kelly Ripa & Michael Strahan	Yes	Adam Levine, Mike Tyson	No
October 28	Kelly Ripa & Michael Strahan	Yes	Seth Meyers, Stephen Moyer, Andrea Bocelli	Yes
October 29	Kelly Ripa & Michael Strahan	Yes	Sandra Bullock, Jamie Oliver	No
October 30	Kelly Ripa & Michael Strahan	No	'LIVE's Best Halloween Show Ever: Nightmare on 67th Street'	No

=== November 2015 ===
Date	Co-hosts	"Host chat"	Guests / segments	"Kelly and Michael's Inbox"
November 2	Kelly Ripa & Michael Strahan	Yes	Allison Janney, Steve Martin & Edie Brickell, Behind the Scenes of Halloween Show, LIVE's Paw-fect Pet Week – Andrea Arden	No
November 3	Kelly Ripa & Michael Strahan	Yes	Gwen Stefani, Ralph Fiennes, LIVE's Paw-fect Pet Week – Dr. Jennifer Jellison	Yes
November 4	Kelly Ripa & Michael Strahan	Yes	Andy Cohen, Bryan Adams, LIVE's Paw-fect Pet Week – Dr. Karen Halligan	No
November 5	Kelly Ripa & Michael Strahan	Yes	Daniel Craig, Harry Connick Jr. LIVE's Paw-fect Pet Week – Bernadette Peters	No
November 6	Kelly Ripa & Michael Strahan	Yes	Christoph Waltz, Antonio Banderas, LIVE's Paw-fect Pet Week – Paw-fect Pet Photo Contest	No
November 9	Kelly Ripa & Michael Strahan	Yes	Daniel Radcliffe, Bryshere Gray, Seal	No
November 10	Kelly Ripa & Michael Strahan	Yes	Jennifer Connelly, Rainn Wilson, James Bay	Yes
November 11	Kelly Ripa & Michael Strahan	Yes	Viola Davis, James McAvoy, Lance Ulanoff	No
November 12	Kelly Ripa & Michael Strahan	Yes	Ethan Hawke, Emma Roberts, Tim McGraw	No
November 13	Kelly Ripa & Michael Strahan	Yes	John Stamos, Dr. Melina Jampolis, A Great Big World	No
November 16	Kelly Ripa & Michael Strahan	Yes	Blake Shelton, Kyle Chandler, We Said Whaaat? Week – French Fry Tasting	No
November 17	Kelly Ripa & Michael Strahan	Yes	Cate Blanchett, Burt Reynolds, We Said Whaaat? Week – Gift Wrapping	No
November 18	Kelly Ripa & Michael Strahan	Yes	Liam Hemsworth, Cee Lo Green, We Said Whaaat? Week – Pajama Fashion Show	No
November 19	Kelly Ripa & Michael Strahan	Yes	Hillary Clinton, Josh Hutcherson, We Said Whaaat? Week	No
November 20	Kelly Ripa & Michael Strahan	Yes	Elizabeth Banks, Shawn Mendes, We Said Whaaat? Week – Kelly & Michael perform with A Great Big World	No
November 23	Kelly Ripa & Michael Strahan	Yes	Pharrell Williams, Jena Malone, Holly Holm	No
November 24	Kelly Ripa & Michael Strahan	Yes	Jennifer Hudson, Josh Groban, Kyle Busch	No
November 25	Kelly Ripa & Michael Strahan	Yes	Mariah Carey, Melissa Benoist, Kelly Cooks Thanksgiving Leftovers	No
November 27	Kelly Ripa & Michael Strahan	Yes	Jesse Tyler Ferguson, Beth Behrs, Joss Stone	No
November 30	Kelly Ripa & Michael Strahan	Yes	Michael Chiklis, Uzo Aduba, LIVE's Holiday Gift Guide – Michelle Tan	No

=== December 2015 ===
Date	Co-hosts	"Host chat"	Guests / segments	"Kelly and Michael's Inbox"
December 1	Kelly Ripa & Michael Strahan	Yes	Harrison Ford, Frank Grillo, LIVE's Holiday Gift Guide – Monica Mangin	No
December 2	Kelly Ripa & Michael Strahan	Yes	Mary J. Blige, Faith Ford & Ted McGinley, LIVE's Holiday Gift Guide – Lawrence Zarian	No
December 3	Kelly Ripa & Michael Strahan	Yes	Carrie Fisher, LIVE's Holiday Gift Guide – Chris Byrne	No
December 4	Kelly Ripa & Michael Strahan	Yes	Justin Theroux, LIVE's Holiday Gift Guide – Lance Ulanoff	No
December 7	Kelly Ripa & Anderson Cooper	Yes	Chris Hemsworth, Billie Lourd	Yes
December 8	Kelly Ripa & Michael Strahan	Yes	Maya Rudolph, Daisy Ridley, Gigi Hadid	No
December 9	Kelly Ripa & Michael Strahan	Yes	Donald Trump, John Boyega, Chris Isaak	No
December 10	Kelly Ripa & Michael Strahan	Yes	Amy Poehler, Mandy Patinkin, High Tech Holiday Decorations	No
December 11	Kelly Ripa & Michael Strahan	Yes	Lupita Nyong'o, Kirsten Dunst	Yes
December 14	Kelly Ripa & Michael Strahan	Yes	Mark Wahlberg, Gwendoline Christie, Sara Bareilles	No
December 15	Kelly Ripa & Michael Strahan	Yes	Jennifer Lawrence, Raymond Crowe	No
December 16	Kelly Ripa & Michael Strahan	Yes	Will Ferrell, Bella Thorne	No
December 17	Kelly Ripa & Michael Strahan	Yes	Kurt Russell, Daya	No
December 18	Kelly Ripa & Michael Strahan	Yes	Robert De Niro, Natalie Dormer, Winner of #liveAOK Announced	Yes
December 21	Kelly Ripa & Michael Strahan	Yes	Bruce Willis, Kevin Zraly Disney on Ice	No
December 22	Kelly Ripa & Michael Strahan	Yes	'LIVE's Cozy Christmas Eve': Channing Tatum, CeeLo Green, The Radio City Rockettes, Santa	Yes
December 28	Kelly Ripa & Michael Strahan	Yes	James Spader, Elizabeth McGovern, Carly Simon, LIVE's Most Popular Social Media Posts	No
December 29	Kelly Ripa & Michael Strahan	Yes	LIVE's Viewers' Choice End of the Year Show	No

=== January 2016 ===
Date	Co-hosts	"Host chat"	Guests / segments	"Kelly and Michael's Inbox"
January 4	Kelly Ripa & Michael Strahan	Yes	Samuel L. Jackson, Ben Higgins, Pia Wurtzbach	No
January 5	Kelly Ripa & Michael Strahan	Yes	Ryan Seacrest, Jennifer Jason Leigh, LIVE's New Year, New You Week – Viewers' Resolutions	No
January 6	Kelly Ripa & Michael Strahan	Yes	Felicity Huffman, Damian Lewis, LIVE's New Year, New You Week – James Oseland	No
January 7	Kelly Ripa & Michael Strahan	Yes	Emmy Rossum, LIVE's New Year, New You Week – Shaun T	Yes
January 8	Kelly Ripa & Michael Strahan	Yes	Tyler Perry, LIVE's New Year, New You Week – Ian Smith	Yes
January 11	Kelly Ripa & Michael Strahan	Yes	John Krasinski, Heather Graham	Yes
January 12	Kelly Ripa & Michael Strahan	Yes	Ray Liotta, Lucy Hale, LIVE's New Year, New You – Dr. Melina Jampolis	No
January 13	Kelly Ripa & Michael Strahan	Yes	Ice Cube, Brie Larson, LIVE's New Year, New You – Jason Jacobsen	No
January 14	Kelly Ripa & Michael Strahan	Yes	Hugh Bonneville, Olivia Munn	No
January 15	Kelly Ripa & Michael Strahan	Yes	Khloe Kardashian, San Diego Zoo Animals	No
January 18	Kelly Ripa & Michael Strahan	Yes	Patricia Arquette, Megan Boone, LIVE's New Year, New You – Lance Ulanoff	No
January 19	Kelly Ripa & Michael Strahan	Yes	Vanessa Hudgens, R. City, LIVE's New Year, New You – Michelle Geilan	No
January 20	Kelly Ripa & Michael Strahan	Yes	Jenna Fischer, Josh Radnor	Yes
January 21	Kelly Ripa & Michael Strahan	Yes	Kelsey Grammer, Daymond John	No
January 22	Kelly Ripa & Michael Strahan	Yes	Julianne Hough, LIVE's New Year, New You – Dr. Tasneem Bhatia	Yes
January 25	Kelly Ripa & Michael Strahan	Yes	Christian Slater, Sullivan Stapleton, LIVE's New Year, New You – Rupa Mehta	No
January 26	Kelly Ripa & Michael Strahan	Yes	Kate Hudson, Carly Rae Jepsen	Yes
January 27	Kelly Ripa & Michael Strahan	Yes	Chris Pine, Lily James, Shawn Hook	Yes
January 28	Kelly Ripa & Michael Strahan	Yes	Josh Brolin, Lili Taylor	Yes
January 29	Kelly Ripa & Michael Strahan	Yes	Joshua Jackson, Michelle Dockery, LIVE's New Year, New You – Aaron Tolson	Yes

=== February 2016 ===
Date	Co-hosts	"Host chat"	Guests / segments	"Kelly and Michael's Inbox"
February 1	Kelly Ripa & Michael Strahan	Yes	Cuba Gooding Jr., LIVE's Big Game Week – Predicting the Winners	No
February 2	Kelly Ripa & Michael Strahan	Yes	John Travolta, Kermit the Frog, LIVE's Big Game Week – Kelly Makes Artichoke Dip	No
February 3	Kelly Ripa & Michael Strahan	Yes	Rebel Wilson, L.A. Reid, LIVE's Big Game Week – Michael Makes Sweet Potato Fries	No
February 4	Kelly Ripa & Michael Strahan	Yes	Dakota Johnson, Malin Åkerman, LIVE's Big Game Week – Gelman Makes Guacamole	No
February 5	Kelly Ripa & Michael Strahan	Yes	Leslie Mann, Morena Baccarin, LIVE's Big Game Week – Kelly Burkhardt Makes Dessert	No
February 8	Kelly Ripa & Michael Strahan	Yes	Katie Holmes, Vanna White, MyM&Ms Giveaway	Yes
February 9	Kelly Ripa & Michael Strahan	Yes	Ryan Reynolds, Fred Savage	No
February 10	Kelly Ripa & Michael Strahan	Yes	Ben Stiller, Bob Odenkirk	Yes
February 11	Kelly Ripa & Michael Strahan	Yes	Penélope Cruz, Bobby Cannavale, Maddie & Tae	No
February 12	Kelly Ripa & Michael Strahan	Yes	Kelly's Sweet 15 Anniversary Celebration	No
February 15	Kelly Ripa & Michael Strahan	Yes	Allison Williams, Danai Gurira, Rick Springfield	Yes
February 16	Kelly Ripa & Michael Strahan	Yes	Jeff Probst, Lauren Cohan	No
February 17	Kelly Ripa & Michael Strahan	Yes	Anthony Anderson, Derek Hough, Lance Ulanoff	No
February 18	Kelly Ripa & Michael Strahan	Yes	Kiefer Sutherland, Travis Fimmel, Jazmine Sullivan	Yes
February 19	Kelly Ripa & Michael Strahan	Yes	Jeremy Irons, Lori Loughlin, Chris Byrne	Yes
February 22	Kelly Ripa & Michael Strahan	Yes	Angela Bassett, Rachael Harris, LIVE's Oscar Countdown Games	No
February 23	Kelly Ripa & Michael Strahan	Yes	Chelsea Handler, Denny Hamlin, Roberto Hernandez, LIVE's Oscar Countdown Games	Yes
February 24	Kelly Ripa & Michael Strahan	Yes	Taraji P. Henson, Nikolaj Coster-Waldau, LIVE's Oscar Countdown Games	Yes
February 25	Kelly Ripa & Michael Strahan	Yes	Ginnifer Goodwin, Jodie Sweetin, LIVE's Oscar Countdown Games	No
February 26	Kelly Ripa & Michael Strahan	Yes	LIVE's Pre-Oscar Celebration: Forest Whitaker, Cocktails & Mocktails, Oscar Memories and Flashbacks	No
February 29	Kelly Ripa & Michael Strahan	Yes	LIVE's After Oscar Show: Andy Grammer & Dancing with the Stars Dancers, Fifth Harmony, Carson Kressley & Lawrence Zarian, Brie Larson	No

=== March 2016 ===
Date	Co-hosts	"Host chat"	Guests / segments	"Kelly and Michael's Inbox"
March 1	Kelly Ripa & Michael Strahan	Yes	Gerard Butler, Chrissy Teigen	Yes
March 2	Kelly Ripa & Michael Strahan	Yes	Joan Allen, Laura Prepon	Yes
March 3	Kelly Ripa & Michael Strahan	Yes	John Stamos, Lana Parrilla, Daughtry	Yes
March 4	Kelly Ripa & Michael Strahan	Yes	Tina Fey, Priyanka Chopra	Yes
March 7	Kelly Ripa & Michael Strahan	Yes	Octavia Spencer, Max Greenfield, Nathan Sykes	No
March 8	Kelly Ripa & Michael Strahan	Yes	Will Arnett, Maria Menounos	Yes
March 9	Kelly Ripa & Michael Strahan	Yes	Trisha Yearwood, Chris Meloni	Yes
March 10	Kelly Ripa & Michael Strahan	Yes	Sacha Baron Cohen, Louie Anderson, Rachel Platten	No
March 11	Kelly Ripa & Michael Strahan	Yes	David Muir. Neve Campbell, Enya	No
March 14	Kelly Ripa & Michael Strahan	Yes	Shaliene Woodley, William H. Macy, Jordan Spieth	No
March 15	Kelly Ripa & Michael Strahan	Yes	Ansel Elgort, Ben Higgins & Lauren B, 2016 Prom Trends	No
March 16	Kelly Ripa & Michael Strahan	Yes	Jussie Smollett, Holly Robinson Peete, Zara Larsson	Yes
March 17	Kelly Ripa & Michael Strahan	Yes	Jennifer Garner, Zoë Kravitz, Sabrina Carpenter	No
March 18	Kelly Ripa & Michael Strahan	Yes	Henry Cavill, Miranda Cosgrove	Yes
March 21	Michael Strahan & Malin Åkerman	Yes	Jeff Daniels, Nia Vardalos, LIVE's Auto Show Week – Luxury Vehicles	No
March 22	Michael Strahan & Rebecca Romijn	Yes	Jeremy Piven, Jane Krakowski, LIVE's Auto Show Week – Green Cars	No
March 23	Michael Strahan & Erin Andrews	Yes	Jake Gyllenhaal, LIVE's Auto Show Week – Sedans	No
March 24	Michael Strahan & Erin Andrews	Yes	Don Cheadle, Paul Reubens, LIVE's Auto Show Week – High Performance Vehicles	No
March 25	Michael Strahan & Charissa Thompson	Yes	Amy Adams, Peter Facinelli, LIVE's Auto Show Week – SUVs	No
March 28	Kelly Ripa & Michael Strahan	Yes	Craig Ferguson, Rachel Bloom, LIVE's Flashback Games	No
March 29	Kelly Ripa & Michael Strahan	Yes	Jennifer Lopez, Taylor Kinney, LIVE's Flashback Games	No

=== April 2016 ===
Date	Co-hosts	"Host chat"	Guests / segments	"Kelly and Michael's Inbox"
April 4	Kelly Ripa & Anderson Cooper	Yes	Matthew Perry, Darby Stanchfield, MacKenzie Bourg	No
April 5	Kelly Ripa & Anderson Cooper	Yes	Cameron Diaz, Ben Falcone, Gloria Vanderbilt	No
April 6	Kelly Ripa & David Duchovny	Yes	Melissa McCarthy, Jon Favreau	No
April 7	Kelly Ripa & Mark Consuelos	Yes	Naomi Watts, Ashley Greene	No
April 8	Kelly Ripa & Fred Savage	Yes	Kerry Washington, Sam Heughan, Charlie Puth	No
April 11	Kelly Ripa & Michael Strahan	Yes	Chris O'Donnell, Cedric the Entertainer, Trent Harmon	Yes
April 12	Kelly Ripa & Michael Strahan	Yes	Gwyneth Paltrow, Jennifer Arnold & Bill Klein, Marla Maples & Tony Dovolani, La'Porsha Renae	No
April 13	Kelly Ripa & Michael Strahan	Yes	Kevin Costner, Ken Jeong, Dalton Rapattoni	Yes
April 14	Kelly Ripa & Michael Strahan	Yes	Lupita Nyong'o, Regina Hall	Yes
April 15	Kelly Ripa & Michael Strahan	Yes	Common, Saoirse Ronan	No
April 18	Kelly Ripa & Michael Strahan	Yes	Katharine McPhee, Terry Crews, LIVE's Take Charge of Your Health Week – Amy E. Goodman	No
April 19	Kelly Ripa & Michael Strahan	Yes	Jason Bateman, LIVE's Take Charge of Your Health Week – Dr. Melina Jampolis	Yes
April 20	Michael Strahan & Ana Gasteyer	Yes	Von Miller & Witney Carson, LIVE's Take Charge of Your Health Week – Dr. Taz Bhalia	Yes
April 21	Michael Strahan & Erin Andrews	Yes	Daniel Dae Kim, LIVE's Take Charge of Your Health Week –	Yes
April 22	Michael Strahan & Erin Andrews	Yes	Julia Louis-Dreyfus, LIVE's Take Charge of Your Health Week – Lance Ulanoff	Yes
April 25	Michael Strahan & Shay Mitchell	Yes	Tim Daly, Donnie Wahlberg	Yes
April 26	Kelly Ripa & Michael Strahan	Yes	Bellamy Young, Conor McGregor, Jackie Evancho	No
April 27	Kelly Ripa & Michael Strahan	Yes	Ricky Gervais, Josh Hartnett	No
April 28	Kelly Ripa & Michael Strahan	Yes	Kate Hudson, Keegan-Michael Key, Peter Gros	No
April 29	Kelly Ripa & Michael Strahan	Yes	Adam Levine, Jordan Peele	No

=== May 2016 ===
Date	Co-hosts	"Host chat"	Guests / segments	"Kelly and Michael's Inbox"
May 2	Kelly Ripa & Michael Strahan	Yes	Chadwick Boseman, Adrien Brody, Ruth B	No
May 3	Kelly Ripa & Michael Strahan	Yes	Lucy Liu, Morris Chestnut	No
May 4	Kelly Ripa & Michael Strahan	Yes	Jeremy Renner, Carrie Ann Inaba	Yes
May 5	Kelly Ripa & Michael Strahan	Yes	Robert Downey Jr., Jason Derulo, Marcela Valladolid	No
May 6	Kelly Ripa & Michael Strahan	Yes	Tony Goldwyn, Anthony Mackie	No
May 9	Kelly Ripa & Michael Strahan	Yes	Jodie Foster, Megyn Kelly	No
May 10	Kelly Ripa & Michael Strahan	Yes	Jessica Lange, Laura Bush & Jenna Bush Hager, Edward Wan	Yes
May 11	Kelly Ripa & Michael Strahan	Yes	Chelsea Handler, Lana Parrilla	Yes
May 12	Kelly Ripa & Michael Strahan	Yes	Joe Morton, Kate Beckinsale, Kelsea Ballerini	No
May 13	Kelly Ripa & Michael Strahan	Yes	Michael's Flashback Friday Farewell: Matt Bomer, Carmelo Anthony	No
