= Taisto Miettinen =

Finnish athlete (born 1965)

Taisto Miettinen (born 20 June 1965) is a Finnish athlete. He has won the World champion gold medals for the Water Running 2004, Iron Bar Walking 2012 and Bog Snorkelling 2012, and Kicksled 2014 and was also the winner of the Wife Carrying World Championships in 2009, 2010, 2011, 2012, 2013, 2017, 2022, 2023 and 2026. He has been the oldest contestant, who has won World Championship in wife carrying. He has won 14 medals in wife-carrying World Championship competitions. He has also won a gold medal in the Finnish championship of snowshoe running in 2010, 2011, 2012 and 2014, winter swimming in 2010, silver in the WC competition, and many Finnish champions in the sprint. Miettinen has reached a total of 10 World Championship titles, 19 World Champion medals, 11 Finnish Championship titles, 19 Finnish Championship medals, 9 foreign countries championships as well as 17 foreign countries championship medals, many other titles and records, as well as two world record time (water running 50 m and Wife Carrying 100 m). Miettinen has also won f.ex. Finnish fear factor super man race. CraveOnline has 2012 chosen Miettinen as the world's greatest reigning stupendous unknown champion number 1. He was also the Finnish's most interesting person (final candidate) in 2013.

Miettinen has been selected as the first Finnish Folkparty member of the municipal council in 2012 for the period 2013–2016 in the city of Kauniainen. He was also a candidate for the Finnish parliament 2015.
