= The Little Couple =

- Genre: Reality
- Starring: Bill Klein; Jennifer Arnold-Klein; William Rijin Klein; Zoey Nidhi Klein
- Country of origin: United States
- Original language: English
- No. of seasons: 14
- No. of episodes: 205

Production
- Executive producers: Eric Schotz; Ruth Rivin; Melissa Tallerine
- Producers: Elizabeth Massie; Oliver Oertel; Sonya Gay Bourn
- Editors: Adrian Herrera; Paul Yates; Ryan Ely; Scott Reynolds
- Camera setup: Multiple
- Running time: 22 to 24 minutes
- Production company: LMNO Productions

Original release
- Network: TLC
- Release: May 26, 2009 – September 24, 2019

The Little Couple is an American reality television series on TLC that debuted May 26, 2009. The series features Bill Klein, a businessman, and Dr. Jennifer Arnold, a neonatologist, who both have skeletal dysplasia. Arnold is 96.5 cm (3 ft 2.0 in) and Klein 122 cm (4.00 ft) tall. They moved from New York City, after Jen completed her pediatric residency and masters of medical education at University of Pittsburgh Medical Center.

== Production ==
The show begins with the couple having just moved to Houston, Texas, where the series has documented the customized building of their home and attempts to have a child. Arnold is a neonatologist who works at the Texas Children's Hospital, and Klein is a medical supplies and telemarketing businessman.

They were originally introduced in a one-hour TLC special, Little People: Just Married. Season 1 of the show premiered on May 26, 2009. Season 2 premiered on October 27, 2009. On February 22, 2010, TLC renewed The Little Couple for a third season consisting of 20 episodes. The mid-season finale aired after 9 episodes on July 27, 2010, and season 3 returned on October 12, 2010. It was announced on Facebook that the show would be returning for its 4th season on May 31, 2011. Again, the season was split, with the second half of season 4 premiering on September 27, 2011.

In February 2012, Klein opened Rocky&Maggie in Rice Village Houston. named after their pets Chihuahua Rocky and rescue mutt terrier Maggie. Arnold's mother Judy manages the store. Season 5 began on March 20, 2012, and follows Klein and Arnold as they move into their custom-built dream home and launch a brand-new business. In March 2013, they adopted their son, Will, from Hohhot, China. The adoption of their son, who also has dwarfism, is featured in Season 5. On October 15, 2013, they adopted a daughter, Zoey, also a little person, from Delhi, India. The series went on hiatus on June 4, 2013, and returned on August 13, 2013.

In December 2013, Arnold revealed that she was diagnosed with a rare form of cancer, stage 4 choriocarcinoma, due to a non-viable pregnancy she had suffered in September 2013. She allowed the cameras to document her struggle.

Season 6 premiered on March 4, 2014. It features Zoey's adoption, Arnold's cancer treatment, Will's fourth birthday, baptisms, the holiday season, and Arnold's 40th birthday.

The twelfth season premiered on August 6, 2019.

== Episodes ==
=== Series overview ===
Season	Episodes	Originally released	
Season	Episodes	First released	Last released
1	14	May 26, 2009	August 4, 2009
2	18	October 27, 2009	February 23, 2010
3	19	June 1, 2010	December 7, 2010
4	24	May 31, 2011	November 1, 2011
5	14	March 20, 2012	May 15, 2012
6	21	April 30, 2013	October 15, 2013
7	16	March 4, 2014	June 17, 2014
8	12	December 2, 2014	June 30, 2015
9	10	January 5, 2016	March 8, 2016
10	10	September 19, 2017	November 21, 2017
11	13	October 9, 2018	December 4, 2018
12	10	August 6, 2019	September 24, 2019

=== Season 1 (2009) ===
No. overall	No. in season	Title	Original release date
0	0	"Little People: Just Married"	January 19, 2009
1	1	"Bill Moves to Houston"	May 26, 2009
2	2	"Jen's Birthday"	May 26, 2009
3	3	"Gym, Spa, Shop 'Til Bill Drops"	June 2, 2009
4	4	"Work & Play in Galveston"	June 2, 2009
5	5	"House Hunting"	June 9, 2009
6	6	"One Year Anniversary"	June 9, 2009
7	7	"Leavin' on a Jet Plane"	June 16, 2009
8	8	"While the Cat's Away"	June 23, 2009
9	9	"Bill's Honey-Do List"	June 30, 2009
10	10	"Hawaii Here We Come: Part 1"	July 7, 2009
11	11	"Hawaii Here We Come: Part 2"	July 14, 2009
12	12	"The Big Bang Theory"	July 21, 2009
13	13	"Wedding Bells Are Ringing"	July 28, 2009
14	14	"Maybe a Baby?"	August 4, 2009

=== Season 2 (2009–10) ===
No. overall	No. in season	Title	Original release date
1	15	"Waiting to Exhale"	October 27, 2009
2	16	"Take Me Out to the Ball Game"	October 27, 2009
3	17	"Rocky's Revenge"	November 3, 2009
4	18	"Fish Tales"	November 10, 2009
5	19	"Off to See Dr. Oz"	November 17, 2009
6	20	"New York State of Mind"	November 24, 2009
7	21	"Boston Bound"	December 1, 2009
8	22	"All Work and Some Play"	December 8, 2009
9	23	"To Build or Buy?"	December 15, 2009
10	24	"On Track for Bill's Birthday"	December 22, 2009
11	25	"Honey, Are You Wearing That?"	January 5, 2010
12	26	"The Grand Opening"	January 12, 2010
13	27	"Now We're Cooking"	January 19, 2010
14	28	"Houston, We Have a Problem"	January 26, 2010
15	29	"Baby Steps"	February 2, 2010
16	30	"Three Shops and a Baby Doc"	February 9, 2010
17	31	"Family Matters"	February 16, 2010
18	32	"Before We Build, We Rent"	February 23, 2010

=== Season 3 (2010) ===
No. overall	No. in season	Title	Original release date	U.S. viewers (millions)
1	33	"Breaking New Ground"	June 1, 2010	N/A
2	34	"Testing, Testing"	June 8, 2010	N/A
3	35	"There's an Art to It"	June 15, 2010	N/A
4	36	"Runway Dreams"	June 22, 2010	N/A
5	37	"Spotlight on Jen"	June 29, 2010	N/A
6	38	"It's Comedy Tonight!"	July 13, 2010	N/A
7	39	"A House Taking Shape"	July 20, 2010	N/A
8	40	"Just the Facts, Please"	July 27, 2010	N/A
9	41	"A Little FAQ"	July 27, 2010	N/A
10	42	"New House, New Hormones!"	October 12, 2010	N/A
11	43	"Cruisin' to the Caribbean"	October 12, 2010	N/A
12	44	"We Have a Project"	October 19, 2010	1.14
13	45	"Rocky's Companion"	October 26, 2010	1.15
14	46	"What's Up Doctors?"	November 2, 2010	1.29
15	47	"Great Egg-Spectations"	November 9, 2010	1.14
16	48	"Las Vegas Tails"	November 16, 2010	N/A
17	49	"24 Hours in the NICU"	November 23, 2010	1.14
18	50	"Pushing the House Forward"	November 30, 2010	1.59
19	51	"This Changes Everything"	December 7, 2010	N/A

=== Season 4 (2011) ===
No. overall	No. in season	Title	Original release date	U.S. viewers (millions)
1	52	"Third Time's a Charm?"	May 31, 2011	1.19
2	53	"Any Way We Want It"	May 31, 2011	1.23
3	54	"Yee Haw!"	June 7, 2011	N/A
4	55	"Off the Deep End"	June 7, 2011	N/A
5	56	"Home Stretch"	June 14, 2011	1.09
6	57	"Dr. Arnold Goes to Washington"	June 14, 2011	1.01
7	58	"Hooray for Hollywood!"	June 21, 2011	1.40
8	59	"It's Valentine's Day?"	June 28, 2011	1.22
9	60	"In-Laws! Incoming!"	July 5, 2011	1.01
10	61	"Another Egg-Cellent Attempt"	July 12, 2011	1.12
11	62	"Big Apple Anniversary"	July 19, 2011	1.08
12	63	"New House Delays"	July 26, 2011	1.07
13	64	"The Match Game"	August 2, 2011	1.20
14	65	"Will You Be My Surrogate?"	September 27, 2011	1.31
15	66	"See You Later, Alligator?"	September 27, 2011	1.01
16	67	"Uncle Bill"	October 4, 2011	1.09
17	68	"Mother Knows Best"	October 4, 2011	1.04
18	69	"There's No Place Called Home"	October 11, 2011	1.14
19	70	"You Bowl Me Over"	October 11, 2011	1.21
20	71	"Home at Last"	October 18, 2011	1.15
21	72	"It's All by Design!"	October 18, 2011	1.25
22	73	"The Start of Something Big"	October 25, 2011	1.12
23	74	"A Little More Q & A"	October 25, 2011	1.14
24	75	"Are We Pregnant?"	November 1, 2011	1.50

=== Season 5 (2012) ===
No. overall	No. in season	Title	Original release date	U.S. viewers (millions)
1	76	"Getting Back on Track"	March 20, 2012	1.11
2	77	"A Little Thanks"	March 20, 2012	1.01
3	78	"Can We Deck the Halls?"	March 27, 2012	1.28
4	79	"Man Cave; Woman Cave"	March 27, 2012	1.21
5	80	"Four Little Embryos"	April 3, 2012	0.80
6	81	"A Store is Born"	April 3, 2012	0.82
7	82	"A Very Klein Christmas"	April 10, 2012	0.87
8	83	"Ready, Set, Relax!"	April 10, 2012	0.84
9	84	"Grand Opening Weekend"	April 17, 2012	0.68
10	85	"New Leash on Life"	April 17, 2012	0.87
11	86	"The Cocktail Party"	April 24, 2012	0.76
12	87	"A Little Bit Country"	May 1, 2012	0.81
13	88	"A Little State Pride"	May 8, 2012	0.72
14	89	"Adopting a New Approach"	May 15, 2012	0.77

=== Season 6 (2013) ===
No. overall	No. in season	Title	Original release date	U.S. viewers (millions)
1	90	"The Golden Son"	April 30, 2013	1.48
2	91	"And His Name Is..."	April 30, 2013	1.55
3	92	"An Adoption Twist"	May 7, 2013	1.55
4	93	"Baby Proofing"	May 7, 2013	1.79
5	94	"Countdown to China"	May 14, 2013	1.49
6	95	"Road to Parenthood"	May 14, 2013	1.52
7	96	"William, Here We Come!"	May 21, 2013	2.01
8	97	"Best Day Yet!"	May 28, 2013	1.20
9	98	"Finally a Family"	June 4, 2013	2.01
10	99	"Welcome Home, Will!"	August 13, 2013	2.50
11	100	"Family Fun in Florida"	August 20, 2013	1.92
12	101	"Our Five Year Anniversary"	August 20, 2013	1.86
13	102	"Back to Work!"	August 27, 2013	2.13
14	103	"Check-Up Time"	August 27, 2013	2.18
15	104	"A Mother's Day Surprise"	September 3, 2013	1.80
16	105	"Will on Wheels"	September 10, 2013	1.69
17	106	"Bill's First Father's Day"	September 17, 2013	2.18
18	107	"Will's First Surgery"	September 24, 2013	2.22
19	108	"Time Out for Will"	October 1, 2013	2.07
20	109	"Making a Splash"	October 8, 2013	2.01
21	110	"Countdown to India"	October 15, 2013	2.19

=== Season 7 (2014) ===
No. overall	No. in season	Title	Original release date	U.S. viewers (millions)
1	111	"Zoey Makes 4"	March 4, 2014	3.89
2	112	"The Unexpected"	March 11, 2014	3.16
3	113	"We're in This Together"	March 18, 2014	3.21
4	114	"Our First Christmas"	March 25, 2014	3.28
5	115	"Our New Normal"	April 1, 2014	3.27
6	116	"Ring the Bell!"	April 8, 2014	2.83
7	117	"San Fran, Here We Come!"	April 15, 2014	2.76
8	118	"Tea Time with Zoey"	April 22, 2014	2.65
9	119	"Will's Birthday Party"	April 29, 2014	2.28
10	120	"Just What the Doctor Ordered"	May 6, 2014	2.54
11	121	"A Grand Time with Grandma"	May 13, 2014	2.79
12	122	"Back to Business"	May 20, 2014	2.06
13	123	"All You Wanted to Know"	May 27, 2014	2.53
14	124	"First Easter Together"	June 3, 2014	2.85
15	125	"Jen's Big 4-0"	June 10, 2014	2.90
16	126	"I Do...Again"	June 17, 2014	3.06

=== Season 8 (2014–15) ===
No. overall	No. in season	Title	Original release date	U.S. viewers (millions)
1	127	"Have a Little Faith"	December 2, 2014	2.61
2	128	"Device Free Day"	December 9, 2014	2.09
3	129	"First Week of School"	December 16, 2014	2.00
4	130	"Zoey's Birthday Party"	December 23, 2014	1.65
5	131	"Bill's Birthday Surprise"	December 30, 2014	2.48
6	132	"Bill's Surgery"	January 6, 2015	2.46
7	133	"Lift Off!"	May 26, 2015	2.17
8	134	"A Little Holiday Spirit"	June 2, 2015	1.70
9	135	"New Adventures"	June 9, 2015	1.64
10	136	"Will's 5th Birthday!"	June 16, 2015	1.59
11	137	"An Open Book"	June 23, 2015	1.66
12	138	"A Little Q&A"	June 30, 2015	1.44

=== Season 9 (2016) ===
No. overall	No. in season	Title	Original release date	U.S. viewers (millions)
1	139	"Zoey's 4th Birthday"	January 5, 2016	2.61
2	140	"Back to School"	January 12, 2016	2.09
3	141	"Safety First!"	January 19, 2016	N/A
4	142	"A Fashion Show"	January 26, 2016	N/A
5	143	"Big Family Changes"	February 2, 2016	N/A
6	144	"A Little Trip to the Big Easy"	February 9, 2016	N/A
7	145	"All Aboard!"	February 16, 2016	N/A
8	146	"Mr. Mom"	February 23, 2016	N/A
9	147	"New Challenges"	March 1, 2016	N/A
10	148	"A Little 4-1-1"	March 8, 2016	N/A

=== Season 10 (2017) ===
No. overall	No. in season	Title	Original release date	U.S. viewers (millions)
1	149	"A Sheep Is Going to Eat Us!"	September 19, 2017	N/A
2	150	"Hold on Everybody"	September 26, 2017	N/A
3	151	"He Peed! He Peed!"	October 3, 2017	N/A
4	152	"I'm a Little Boss"	October 10, 2017	N/A
5	153	"I Want to Be President"	October 17, 2017	N/A
6	154	"Quack! Quack! Quack!"	October 24, 2017	N/A
7	155	"I Love Candy!"	October 31, 2017	N/A
8	156	"I'm Not a Baby!"	November 7, 2017	N/A
9	157	"Dear Santa, I Love You"	November 14, 2017	N/A
10	158	"Let's Go In The Snow!"	November 21, 2017	N/A

=== Season 11 (2018) ===
No. overall	No. in season	Title	Original release date	U.S. viewers (millions)
1	159	"Why Do We Have to Move?"	October 9, 2018	N/A
2	160	"Where's The Flyin' Lion"	October 9, 2018	N/A
3	161	"And I Don't Like Alligators!"	October 16, 2018	N/A
4	162	"Yellow Eggs!"	October 16, 2018	N/A
5	163	"Time To Leave!"	October 23, 2018	N/A
6	164	"It's A Big, Family Road Trip!"	October 30, 2018	N/A
7	165	"We Can Stay Here! Forever!"	October 30, 2018	N/A
8	166	"The Toilet Exploded!"	November 6, 2018	N/A
9	167	"I'm Gonna Catch The Biggest Fish!"	November 13, 2018	N/A
10	168	"A Storm To Be Reckoned With"	November 20, 2018	N/A
11	169	"You're A Fish Approver!"	November 27, 2018	N/A
12	170	"Will Returns To China"	December 4, 2018	N/A
13	171	"I Don't Want to Leave!"	December 4, 2018	N/A

=== Season 12 (2019) ===
No. overall	No. in season	Title	Original release date	U.S. viewers (millions)
1	172	"Wait, They're Cutting You Open?"	August 6, 2019	N/A
2	173	"Let's Have a Bravo to Dad!"	August 6, 2019	N/A
3	174	"This Is How a Dude Does It"	August 13, 2019	N/A
4	175	"I'm a Real Pirate!"	August 13, 2019	N/A
5	176	"Surprise!"	August 20, 2019	N/A
6	177	"We Part-Tay!"	August 27, 2019	N/A
7	178	"The "Scare" Boat"	September 3, 2019	N/A
8	179	"Namaste"	September 10, 2019	N/A
9	180	"It's Definitely Gator Water"	September 17, 2019	N/A
10	181	"This Is How We Party"	September 24, 2019	N/A
