= Lance Ulanoff =

American tech and social media commentator

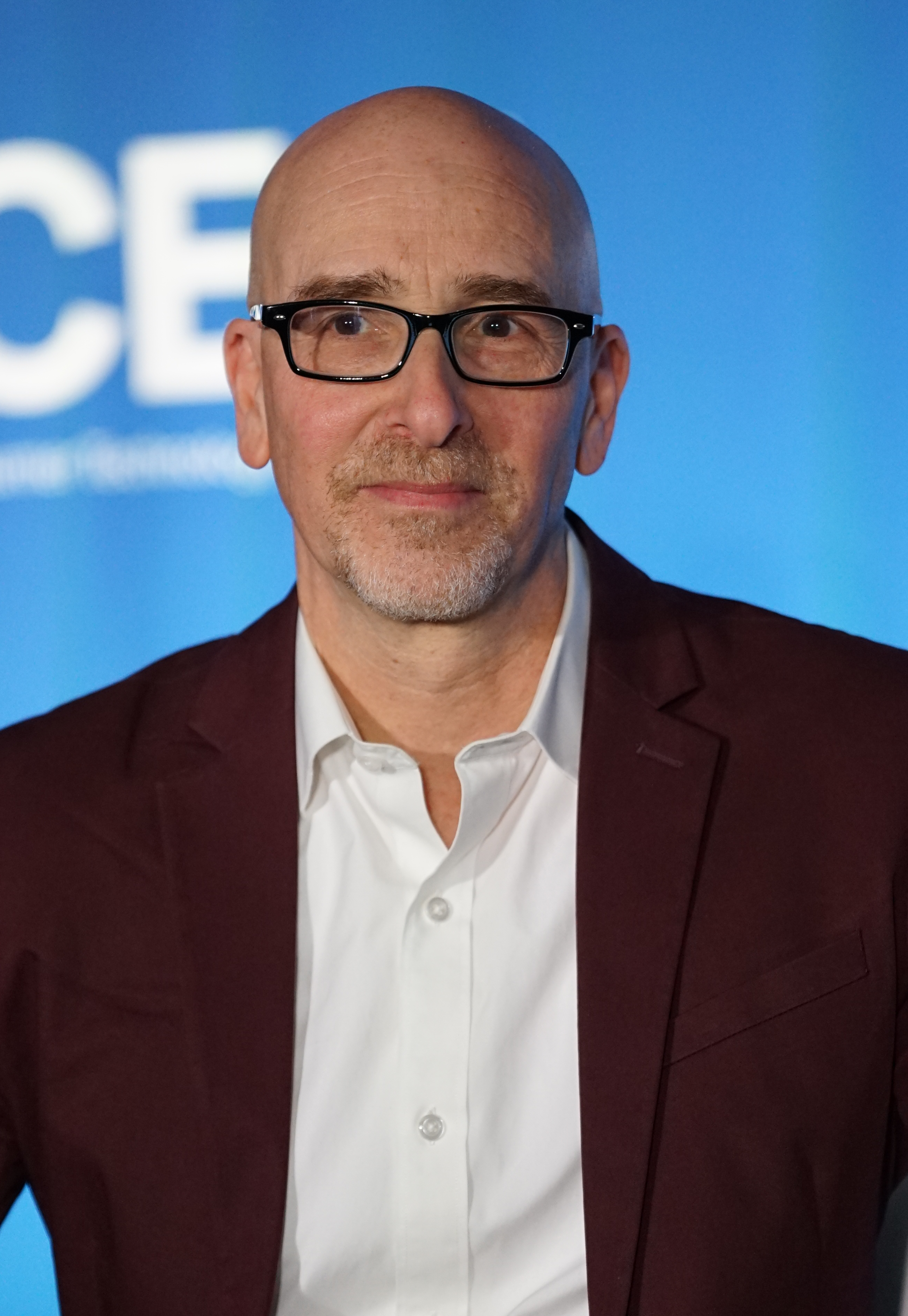
- Ulanoff at CES 2026
- Education: Hofstra University (BA)
- Occupations: Journalist, tech analyst, editor
- Years active: 1980s–present
- Known for: Tech journalism, social media commentary
- Title: Editor-at-Large at TechRadar
- Website: www.lanceulanoff.com

Lance Ulanoff is an American tech and social media commentator. He is U.S. editor-in-chief of TechRadar. His previous positions include editor-in-chief of PCMag.com, PC Magazine, and Mashable; senior vice-president of content for PCMag Digital Network; editor at Mashable; and editor of PCMag.com.

Ulanoff attended Hofstra University and started his journalism career as a newspaper reporter on Long Island. In 1996, Ulanoff became the online editor at popular computing magazine, HomePC, and whilst there launched AskDrPC.com and KidRaves.com. In 1998 he was appointed by Windows Magazine as their online version's senior editor. Winmag.com drew 6,000,000 page hits a month, and was the runner-up in the Computer Press Association's "Best Overall Website" category. In August 1999 Ulanoff moved to Deja.com as producer for the Computing and Consumer Electronics channels, and was named senior director for content.

In November 2000, PC Magazine rehired Ulanoff; the website was relaunched in July 2001. It won an ASBPE in 2004, and was runner-up for "Best Web Site" at the 2002 American Business Media's Annual Neal Awards. In August 2007 he became the editor-in-chief of PC Magazine.

For three years, Ulanoff also appeared on the syndicated radio show Rover's Morning Glory on a segment called Tech Tuesday.

He also appears on national television news shows, including CNBC, Fox News, PBS NewsHour, MSNBC, CNNHLN and others as a tech and social media expert.
