= 34th Daytime Emmy Awards =

- Date: June 15, 2007 (Ceremony); June 14, 2007 (Creative Arts Awards)
- Location: Kodak Theatre, Los Angeles, California
- Presented by: National Academy of Television Arts and Sciences

Highlights
- Outstanding Drama Series: Guiding Light and The Young and the Restless (tie)
- Outstanding Game Show: The Price is Right

Television/radio coverage
- Network: CBS

The 34th Daytime Emmy Awards, commemorating excellence in American daytime programming from 2006, was held on June 15, 2007 at the Kodak Theatre in Los Angeles, California. CBS televised the ceremonies in the United States, their last time doing so as of 2017. Meanwhile, Creative Arts Emmy Awards were presented one day earlier on June 14 at the Hollywood and Highland Ballroom.

Nominations for the children's series categories were announced on February 7, 2007. The rest of the nominations were released on March 14.

The "Service Show" award categories were renamed the "Lifestyle" categories. Also a new award for Outstanding Morning Programming debuted. The Creative Arts Awards were held the day before the regular ceremony.

== Nominations and winners ==
The following is a partial list of nominees, with winners in bold:

=== Outstanding Drama Series ===
A first-place tie was recorded in this category.

- The Bold and the Beautiful
- **Guiding Light**
- One Life to Live
- **The Young and the Restless**

=== Outstanding Lead Actress in a Drama Series ===
- Crystal Chappell (Olivia Spencer, Guiding Light)
- Jeanne Cooper (Katherine Chancellor, The Young and the Restless)
- Michelle Stafford (Phyllis Summers Newman, The Young and the Restless)
- **Maura West (Carly Tenney Snyder, As the World Turns)**
- Kim Zimmer (Reva Shayne, Guiding Light)

=== Outstanding Lead Actor in a Drama Series ===
- Peter Bergman (Jack Abbott, The Young and the Restless)
- Anthony Geary (Luke Spencer, General Hospital)
- Ricky Paull Goldin (Gus Aitoro, Guiding Light)
- **Christian LeBlanc (Michael Baldwin, The Young and the Restless)**
- Michael Park (Jack Snyder, As the World Turns)

=== Outstanding Supporting Actress in a Drama Series ===
- **Genie Francis (Laura Spencer, General Hospital)**
- Renée Elise Goldsberry (Evangeline Williamson, One Life to Live)
- Rebecca Herbst (Elizabeth Webber, General Hospital)
- Lesli Kay (Felicia Forrester, The Bold and the Beautiful)
- Gina Tognoni (Dinah Marler, Guiding Light)
- Heather Tom (Kelly Cramer, One Life to Live)

=== Outstanding Supporting Actor in a Drama Series ===
- Trent Dawson (Henry Coleman, As the World Turns)
- Dan Gauthier (Kevin Buchanan, One Life to Live)
- **Rick Hearst (Ric Lansing, General Hospital)**
- Greg Rikaart (Kevin Fisher, The Young and the Restless)
- Kristoff St. John (Neil Winters, The Young and the Restless)

=== Outstanding Younger Actress in a Drama Series ===
- Julie Marie Berman (Lulu Spencer, General Hospital)
- Alexandra Chando (Maddie Coleman, As the World Turns)
- Stephanie Gatschet (Tammy Winslow Randall, Guiding Light)
- **Jennifer Landon (Gwen Norbeck Munson, As the World Turns)**
- Leven Rambin (Lily Montgomery, All My Children)

=== Outstanding Younger Actor in a Drama Series ===
- Van Hansis (Luke Snyder, As the World Turns)
- **Bryton McClure (Devon Hamilton, The Young and the Restless)**
- Tom Pelphrey (Jonathan Randall, Guiding Light)
- Jesse Soffer (Will Munson, As the World Turns)
- James Stevenson (Jared Casey, Passions)

=== Outstanding Drama Series Writing Team ===
- The Bold and the Beautiful
- General Hospital
- **Guiding Light**
- The Young and the Restless

=== Outstanding Drama Series Directing Team ===
- **As the World Turns**
- General Hospital
- Guiding Light
- One Life to Live

=== Outstanding Game/Audience Participation Show ===
- Jeopardy!
- **The Price is Right**
- Who Wants to be a Millionaire

=== Outstanding Game Show Host ===
- Ben Bailey, Cash Cab
- **Bob Barker, The Price is Right**
- Pat Sajak, Wheel of Fortune
- Alex Trebek, Jeopardy!
- Meredith Vieira, Who Wants to be a Millionaire

=== Outstanding Talk Show ===
- Dr. Phil
- **The Ellen DeGeneres Show**
- Rachael Ray
- The Tyra Banks Show
- The View

=== Outstanding Talk Show Host ===
- Phil McGraw, Dr. Phil
- **Ellen DeGeneres, The Ellen DeGeneres Show**
- Rachael Ray, Rachael Ray
- Lisa Rinna and Ty Treadway, Soap Talk
- Tyra Banks, The Tyra Banks Show
- Barbara Walters, Rosie O'Donnell, Joy Behar and Elisabeth Hasselbeck, The View

=== Outstanding Morning Programming ===
A first-place tie was recorded in this category.

- **Good Morning America**
- Live with Regis and Kelly
- **The Today Show**

=== Outstanding Lifestyle Program ===
- Barefoot Contessa
- The Martha Stewart Show
- **Paula's Home Cooking**
- Sell This House
- This Old House

=== Outstanding Lifestyle Host ===
- Cathie Filian and Steve Piacenza, Creative Juice
- Emeril Lagasse, Essence of Emeril
- Martha Stewart, The Martha Stewart Show
- **Paula Deen, Paula's Home Cooking**

=== Outstanding Special Class Series ===
- Animal Rescue with Alex Paen
- A Baby Story
- Judge Judy
- **Made**
- Starting Over

=== Outstanding Children's Animated Program ===
- **Arthur**
- Curious George
- Peep and the Big Wide World
- Time Warp Trio
- Toddworld

=== Outstanding Special Class Animated Program ===
- The Batman
- Bigfoot Presents: Meteor and the Mighty Monster Trucks
- Growing Up Creepie
- **Tutenstein**

=== Outstanding Performer In An Animated Program ===
- Danica Lee (Ming-Ming Duckling, Wonder Pets)
- Jim Conroy (Ruff Ruffman, FETCH! with Ruff Ruffman)
- Maile Flanagan (Piggley Winks, Jakers! The Adventures of Piggley Winks)
- Russi Taylor (Fernando "Ferny" Toro, Jakers! The Adventures of Piggley Winks)
- **Eartha Kitt (Yzma, The Emperor's New School)**

=== Outstanding Pre-School Children's Series ===
- Hi-5
- Hip Hop Harry
- It's a Big Big World
- The Paz Show
- **Sesame Street**

=== Outstanding Children's Series ===
- Assignment Discovery
- Endurance: High Sierras
- **Reading Rainbow**
- Strange Days at Blake Holsey High

=== Outstanding Performer In A Children's Series ===
A first-place tie was recorded in this category.

- LeVar Burton (Himself, Reading Rainbow)
- **Kevin Clash (Elmo, Sesame Street)**
- **Caroll Spinney (Oscar the Grouch, Sesame Street)**

=== Outstanding Sound Editing - Live Action and Animation ===
- **Timothy J. Borquez, Thomas Syslo, Keith Dickens, Doug Andham, Erik Foreman, Eric Freeman, Mark Keatts, Mark Keefer and Mike Garcia (The Batman)**
- Robert Hargreaves, Mark Keatts, Mark Keefer and Mike Garcia (Legion of Super Heroes)
- Timothy J. Borquez, George Nemzer, Thomas Syslo, Doug Andham, Daisuke Sawa, Keith Dickens, Mark Keatts, Mark Keefer and Mike Garcia (Loonatics Unleashed)
- Blake Norton, Jim Czak, Bill Moss, Bob Schott, Carla Bandini-Lory and Dick Maitland (Sesame Street)
- Thomas Syslo, Timothy J. Borquez, Brian F. Mars, Doug Andham, Eric Freeman, Mark Keatts, Mark Keefer and Mike Garcia (Shaggy & Scooby-Doo Get a Clue!)
- Daisuke Sawa, Timothy J. Borquez, Thomas Syslo, Doug Andham, Eric Freeman and Mark Keatts (Xiaolin Showdown)

=== Outstanding Sound Mixing - Live Action and Animation ===
- Ed Collins, Robert Hargreaves and John Hegedes (Legion of Super Heroes)
- Billy Gardner (Reading Rainbow)
- **Blake Norton, Bob Schott, Jim Czak and Dick Maitland (Sesame Street)**
- Ed Collins and Doug Andham (Shaggy & Scooby-Doo Get a Clue!)

=== Lifetime Achievement Award ===
- **Lee Phillip Bell**
- **James Lipton**
