= Delilah Belle =

American model, actress, and singer

- Born: Delilah Belle Hamlin; June 10, 1998 (age 28); Los Angeles, California, U.S.
- Occupations: Model; actress; singer
- Years active: 2016–present
- Parents: Harry Hamlin (father); Lisa Rinna (mother)
- Relatives: Amelia Gray Hamlin (sister)
- Modeling information
- Height: 5 ft 7 in (1.70 m)
- Hair color: Blonde
- Eye color: Green
- Agency: Elite Model Management; IMG Models; The Lions Management

Delilah Belle Hamlin (born June 10, 1998) is an American model, actress, and singer. The eldest daughter of actors Harry Hamlin and Lisa Rinna, Hamlin began her modeling career at 18, and has modeled for brands such as Skims, Michael Kors, and Steve Madden. She's appeared on the covers of Vogue Japan & Czechoslovakia, and has walked runways for Tommy Hilfiger and Dolce & Gabbana.

== Early life and education ==
Delilah Belle Hamlin was born on June 10, 1998, in Los Angeles, California, to actor Harry Hamlin and actress Lisa Rinna. She has a younger sister, model Amelia Gray Hamlin, and an older paternal half-brother, Dimitri Alexander Hamlin, the son of Harry Hamlin and Swiss actress Ursula Andress.

She attended Halfstrom Academy, a one-on-one individualized study program in Los Angeles, and graduated from high school in June 2017. In January 2018, she enrolled at New York University to study criminal psychology, but withdrew shortly afterward due to mental health difficulties.

== Career ==
In 2010, when Hamlin was 12, she made her television debut in her parents' 2010 reality series Harry Loves Lisa, which followed her parents' family life. Subsequently, she appeared in approximately 45 episodes of The Real Housewives of Beverly Hills (2014–2022) during her mother's tenure as a main cast member.

Hamlin was discovered through Instagram when modeling agencies noticed her posts. In August 2016, Hamlin signed with Elite Model Management. The same month, she appeared in an editorial for Teen Vogue. She would make her runway debut the following month at New York Fashion Week, walking in the Tommy Hilfiger × Gigi Hadid fashion show. In February 2017, she walked in Milan Fashion Week for Dolce & Gabbana in the Baja East runway. In March, she appeared in a editorial for W Magazine, which described her as "the Next Millennial Model to Watch". In April, she signed with IMG Models.

In January 2018, she modeled for the cover of Vogue Japan for its February issue. In February 2019, Hamlin appeared in a fashion editorial for Paper Magazine, photographed by Jasper Soloff. In October 2019, Hamlin and her sister Amelia co-founded a clothing line called DNA in partnership with L.A. Collective, an 18-piece athleisure collection.

In February 2020, she and her sister signed with United Talent Agency and Digital Brand Architects (DBA) for representation across modeling, endorsements, and digital content. The same month, she and her sister Amelia walked for The Blonds brand, debuting the Motorola razr in "Blush Gold", and closed the Dennis Basso Fall 2020 show during New York Fashion Week with their mother. In September, both she and her sister appeared in a SKIMS campaign for the brand's one-year-anniversary. In May 2021, she appeared in the British Phoenix Magazine. In October 2021, she collaborated with London-based jewelry brand Tada & Toy on a limited-edition 10-piece capsule, with a portion of profits donated to The Aspinall Foundation.

In March 2023, Hamlin released her debut single "Nothing Lasts Forever" under the artist name Delilah Belle. She describes her musical style as "ethereal pop." The music video premiered via Paper magazine. During filming, she suffered a seizure on set but continued production the following day. Also that year, she made her acting debut as Joyce Peterson in the Lifetime movie How She Caught a Killer (2023). In December, she signed to The Lions Management. In 2024, she co-starred with her mother in the Lifetime film Mommy Meanest, marking their first time acting together in a scripted project. In October 2024, she was the cover of Vogue Czechoslovakia. In late November, she appeared in the Michael Kors holiday short film "It's Lit".

In April 2025, Hamlin collaborated with Ukrainian brand Guzema to create the "Metamorphosis" jewelry capsule. In July 2025, both she and her sister modeled for their V Magazine profile. Together, the sisters then modeled for H&M's Summer 2025 campaign. In April 2026, she modeled Express' "It Couple, It Looks" campaign alongside Love Island Australia contestant Mick Maio. In May, she partnered with Steve Madden through the brands summer "Bait & Switch" campaign, after appearing in the brands spring campaigns.

== Personal life ==
=== Relationships ===
Hamlin dated Love Island UK contestant Eyal Booker from April 2019 to late 2021. The couple were first linked publicly at Coachella and confirmed their relationship in May 2019. In 2023, she began dating actor Henry Eikenberry, known for Euphoria; the pair made their red carpet debut in June 2023.

=== Health ===
Hamlin was diagnosed with PANDAS as a child, which led to severe anxiety and panic attacks beginning around age 11. Upon her enrollment at New York University, Hamlin began suffering with depression. Eight months later, she returned to Los Angeles and entered a rehabilitation center for mental health issues.

In November 2021, Hamlin was hospitalized following an accidental xanax overdose. She later said that she had previously been diagnosed with Lyme disease, Epstein–Barr virus, and encephalitis, and explained the accidental overdose resulting from prescribed benzodiazepine medication. She achieved sobriety in mid-2021 and publicly celebrated six months sober in February 2022.

In 2025, she disclosed a diagnosis of endometriosis and underwent surgery in August of that year. She discussed her experience on the She MD podcast in December 2025, noting that the condition had been linked to her seizures.

== Filmography ==
Year	Title	Role	Notes
2010	Harry Loves Lisa	Herself	TV Land reality series; 6 episodes
2014–2022	The Real Housewives of Beverly Hills	Herself	Recurring; approx. 45 episodes
2017	Access Hollywood	Herself	2 episodes
2023	How She Caught a Killer	Joyce Peterson	Lifetime television film
2023	In the Kitchen with Harry Hamlin: A Holiday Special	Herself	AMC+/IFC
2024	Mommy Meanest	Summer	Lifetime television film

== Discography ==
Year	Title	Type
2023	"Nothing Lasts Forever"	Single
