= Amelia Gray Hamlin =

American model and television personality

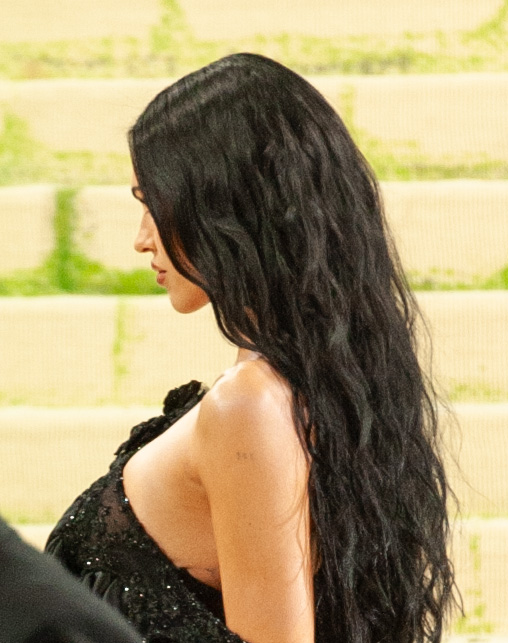
- Hamlin in 2026
- Born: June 13, 2001 (age 25); Los Angeles, California, U.S.
- Other name: Amelia Gray
- Occupation: Model
- Years active: 2017–present
- Parents: Harry Hamlin (father); Lisa Rinna (mother)
- Relatives: Delilah Belle Hamlin (sister)
- Modelling information
- Height: 5 ft 9 1/2 in (1.77 m)
- Hair colour: Brown
- Eye color: Brown
- Agencies: The Lions (New York); Ford Models Paris (Paris)

Amelia Gray Hamlin (born June 13, 2001), professionally known as Amelia Gray, is an American model and television personality.

== Early life ==
Amelia Gray Hamlin was born on June 13, 2001, in Los Angeles, California, to actor Harry Hamlin and actress Lisa Rinna. She has an older sister, Delilah Belle, and an older paternal half-brother, Dimitri Alexander. Hamlin made her first television appearance in an episode of Harry Loves Lisa.

== Career ==
Hamlin began her career as a television personality appearing on The Real Housewives of Beverly Hills.

Hamlin made her runway debut at the Dennis Basso Spring/Summer 2018 show, where she opened and closed the show. In April 2023, Hamlin appeared on the cover of Vogue Japan and Harper's Bazaar France.

Hamlin has appeared in advertising campaigns for Vivienne Westwood, Miu Miu, Courrèges, H&M, Givenchy, Versace, Hugo Boss, and in a Victoria's Secret show. In 2023, Hamlin appeared in 23 fashion shows.

In 2024, Hamlin was recognized as Daily Front Row's model of the year.

== Filmography ==
| Year | Title | Role | Note |
|---|---|---|---|
| 2026 | The Beauty | Harper Rose | Guest star, episode 3: "Beautiful Christopher Cross" |
| 2026 | The Devil Wears Prada 2 | Herself | Cameo, movie |

Music Videos
| Year | Title | Artist | Role | Note |
|---|---|---|---|---|
| 2025 | Gorgeous | Doja Cat | Herself | |
