= Harry Hamlin =

American actor (born 1951)

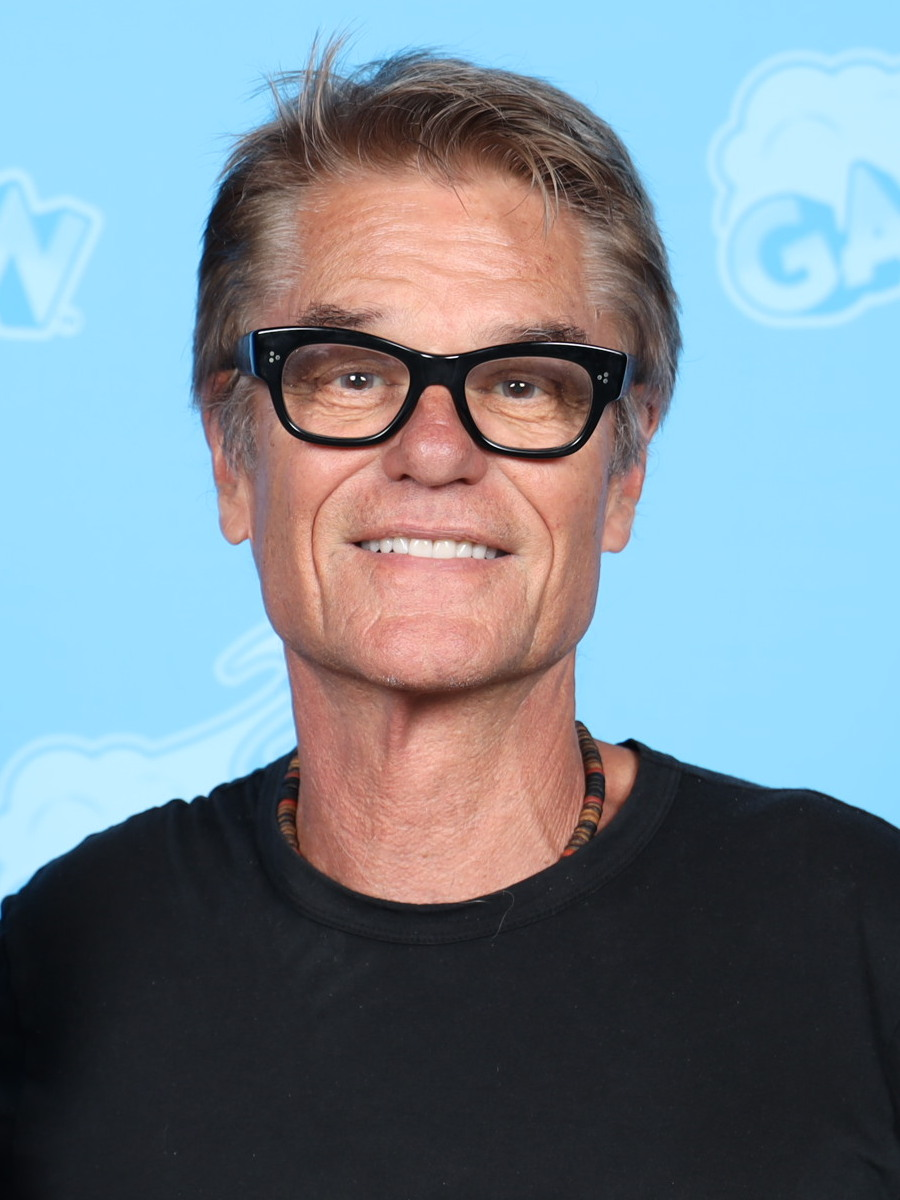
- Hamlin in 2023
- Born: Harry Robinson Hamlin; October 30, 1951 (age 75); Pasadena, California, U.S.
- Education: Yale University (BA); American Conservatory Theater (MFA)
- Occupation: Actor
- Years active: 1976–present
- Known for: L.A. Law; Clash of the Titans; Shameless; Mad Men
- Spouses: Laura Johnson (m. 1985; div. 1989) Nicollette Sheridan (m. 1991; div. 1992) Lisa Rinna (m. 1997)
- Partner: Ursula Andress (1979–1983)
- Children: 3, including Delilah and Amelia
- Website: harryhamlin.com

Harry Robinson Hamlin (born October 30, 1951) is an American actor, author, and entrepreneur. He is widely known for his roles as Perseus in the 1981 fantasy film Clash of the Titans, a role he reprised in 2007's Santa Monica Studio video game God of War II, and as Michael Kuzak in the legal drama series L.A. Law, for which he received three Golden Globe nominations. For his recurring role as Jim Cutler on the AMC drama series Mad Men, Hamlin received a Primetime Emmy nomination for Outstanding Guest Actor in a Drama Series.

== Early life ==
Hamlin was born October 30, 1951, in Pasadena, California, the son of Bernice (née Robinson), a socialite, and Chauncey Jerome Hamlin, Jr., an aeronautical engineer.

Hamlin graduated from Yale University in 1974 with dual Bachelor of Arts degrees in drama and psychology. He then attended the American Conservatory Theater's advanced actor training program, from which he was awarded a Master of Fine Arts degree in acting in 1976. There, Hamlin starred in a production of Equus, attracting the attention of director Stanley Donen.

== Career ==
=== Film and television ===
Hamlin appeared in the 1976 television production of Taming of the Shrew and also had the title role in the 1979 television miniseries Studs Lonigan. He starred in Movie Movie with George C. Scott in 1978, for which he received his first Golden Globe Award nomination. His big-screen break was a starring role in the 1981 Greek mythology fantasy epic Clash of the Titans. Afterwards, his career faltered somewhat with such controversial films as Making Love in 1982 (the first gay themed love story to be produced by a major studio, Twentieth Century Fox) and Blue Skies Again (1983). He returned to television appearing in the miniseries Master of the Game (based on the novel by Sidney Sheldon) in 1984 and Space (based on the novel by James A. Michener) in 1985.

Hamlin appeared on the NBC legal drama series L.A. Law, playing attorney Michael Kuzak. He remained on the series from 1986 to 1991 during which time he was voted People magazine's "Sexiest Man Alive" in 1987. Hamlin left the series at the end of the fifth season having been nominated three times for Best Actor in a Television Series - Drama by the Hollywood Foreign Press Association.

In early 1991 Hamlin appeared in the music video and sang in the choir on the song "Voices That Care" which was made in support of U.S. troops who were stationed in the Middle East and involved in Operation Desert Storm. In 1992, Hamlin guest starred in two episodes of Batman: The Animated Series as Cameron Kaiser and Anthony Romulus. In 1995, he participated in the documentary film, The Celluloid Closet where he discussed his role in the film Making Love.

In 2001, he starred in the television comedy Bratty Babies, and in 2002 he reprised the role of Michael Kuzak in an L.A. Law reunion television film.

In 2004, Hamlin began a recurring role on the television series Veronica Mars. He played fading action hero Aaron Echolls, father to central show character Logan Echolls who had a turbulent relationship with him. Hamlin's character states that he (like the real-life Hamlin) was People magazine's 'Sexiest Man Alive' in 1987. Aaron's wife, Lynn, was played by Hamlin's real-life wife, Lisa Rinna. Hamlin appeared beginning in the sixth episode of the first season, "Return of the Kane", and made his last appearance in the second season finale, "Not Pictured". In 2006, Hamlin took part in the third season of Dancing with the Stars with Ashly DelGrosso, but was voted off the show in the third week.

In 2009, Hamlin starred in the series Harper's Island as Uncle Marty. He was killed abruptly in the first episode by being cut in half while he dangled from a broken wooden bridge.

In June 2010, Hamlin guest-starred in an episode of Army Wives and then became a recurring cast member.

In June 2010, Hamlin starred in the Hallmark Channel film You Lucky Dog.

On December 4, 2008, TV Guide reported that Hamlin and Rinna signed a deal to create a reality television series called Harry Loves Lisa that is based around their family life. The series was developed by TV Land and premiered on October 6, 2010.

In 2012, Hamlin began playing Lloyd Lishman, an older lover to Ian Gallagher (Cameron Monaghan) on the US version of Shameless (7 episodes before the end of Season 3).

Hamlin appeared in an adult diaper commercial with his wife during a primetime television program.

Beginning on April 28, 2013, Hamlin appeared in several episodes of season six (1968) of Mad Men as ad executive Jim Cutler after the merger of Sterling Cooper Draper Pryce and Cutler Gleason and Chaough. Hamlin was nominated for a 2013 Primetime Emmy Award for Outstanding Guest Actor in a Drama Series for his appearance in "A Tale of Two Cities".

In 2016, Hamlin was cast in the Epix comedy Graves starring Nick Nolte, and in 2017, Hamlin was cast as Addison Hayes, a mysterious and powerful mastermind whose agenda collides with Swagger, in the USA Network show Shooter.

In 2022, Hamlin was cast as Cortland Mayfair in AMC's Mayfair Witches, based on the gothic supernatural trilogy Lives of the Mayfair Witches by author Anne Rice.

=== Stage ===
Hamlin made his Broadway debut in 1984 playing Moe Axelrod opposite Frances McDormand in the Broadway revival of Clifford Odets' Awake and Sing!

An avid Shakespearean actor, Hamlin played the title role in Hamlet at the McCarter Theatre in Princeton, New Jersey, where he played Faust in Doctor Faustus the following year.

In 1994, Hamlin received a Helen Hayes Award nomination for his portrayal of the title role in Henry V at the Shakespeare Theater Company in Washington, D.C.

In 1996, Hamlin returned to Broadway as Michael Buchanan in Tennessee Williams' Summer and Smoke at the Roundabout Theater. In 2018, Hamlin starred in A Shakespeare Jubilee! directed by Louis Fantasia at The Wallis in Beverly Hills.

=== Other work ===
In 2010, Hamlin authored Full Frontal Nudity: The Making of an Accidental Actor, published by Scribner, wherein he shares stories of his early life before becoming a film actor. (ISBN 1-4391-6999-3)

=== Entrepreneurship ===
Hamlin is an advocate for fusion power and was an angel investor and co-founder of TAE Technologies, formerly known as Tri Alpha Energy. TAE Technologies states that it is in the final stages of the research and development of a clean, non-radioactive fusion power generator.

Hamlin delivered a talk on fusion at the TEDX LA conference in 2016 entitled, "You Don't Have To Be a Rocket Scientist To Be a Futurist!" Hamlin was also a board member of Advanced Physics Corporation.

Hamlin was president and CEO of the Belle Gray women's clothing boutiques in Los Angeles. Hamlin launched The Lisa Rinna Collection with Lisa Rinna for QVC in 2012.

Hamlin is also on the board of governors of the National Space Society.

== Personal life ==
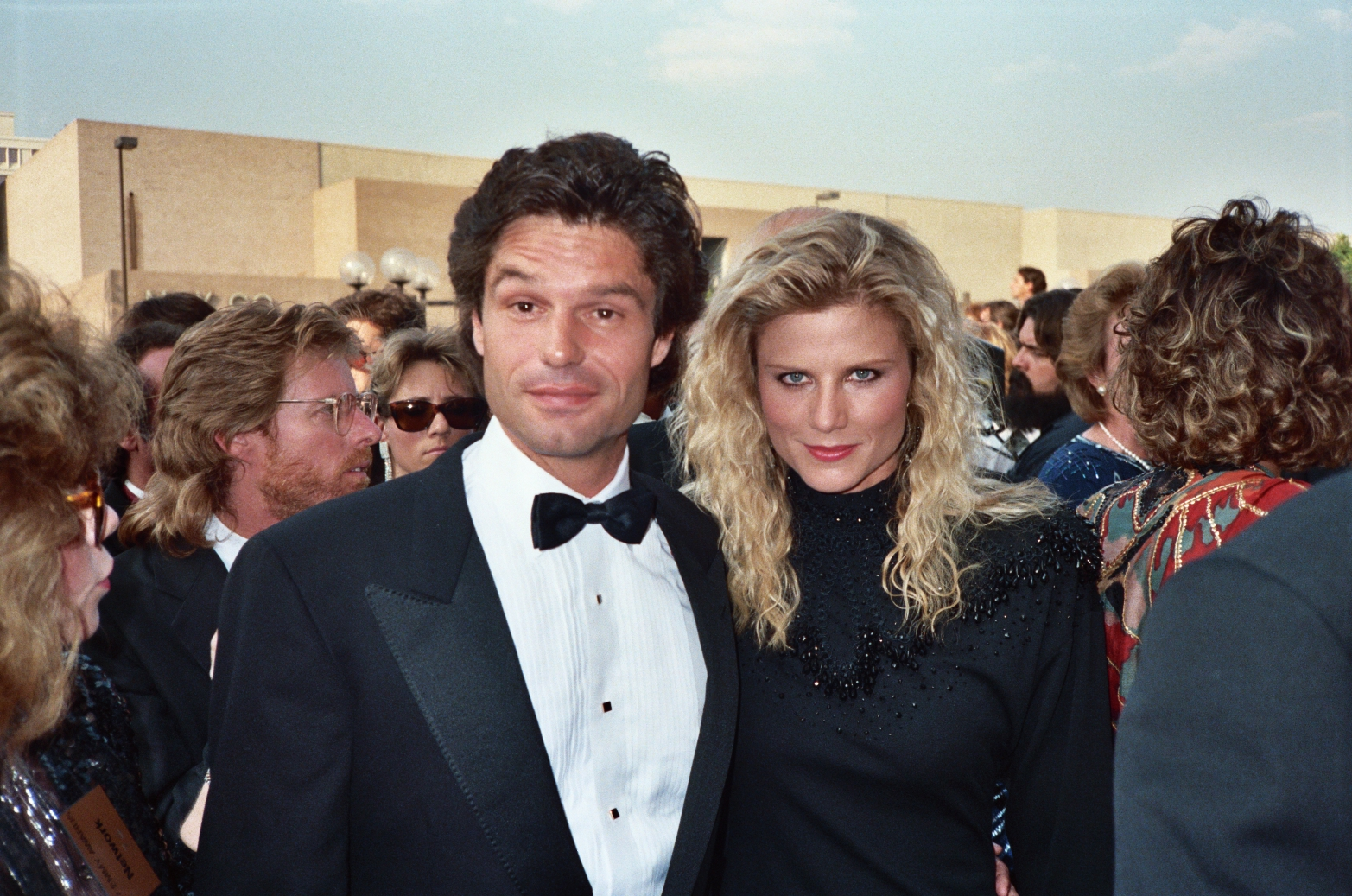
Hamlin with then-wife Laura Johnson at the 1987 Emmy Awards

Hamlin was in a relationship with actress Ursula Andress after meeting on the set of Clash of the Titans in 1979. They had a son, Dimitri Hamlin, in 1980. Although an engagement was announced, the couple never married. In 1983, Hamlin ended their relationship.

From 1985 to 1989, he was married to actress Laura Johnson and, between 1991 and 1992, to actress Nicollette Sheridan.

Since 1997, Hamlin has been married to actress Lisa Rinna, whom he met in 1992. They have two daughters, Delilah (born 1998) and Amelia (born 2001), who both appeared in the reality shows Harry Loves Lisa and The Real Housewives of Beverly Hills with their parents. Hamlin and Rinna starred as married couples in the first season of Veronica Mars and in the 2001 Lifetime film Sex, Lies & Obsession.

Hamlin's wives have all been prime time soap-opera actresses: Rinna starred on Melrose Place, Sheridan was a regular on Knots Landing, Desperate Housewives, and the Dynasty reboot, and Johnson was a regular on Falcon Crest (on which Andress later made guest appearances).

== Filmography ==
=== Film ===
Year	Title	Role	Notes
1978	Movie Movie	Joey Popchik	
1981	Clash of the Titans	Perseus	
1981	King of the Mountain	Steve	
1982	Making Love	Bart McGuire	
1983	Blue Skies Again	Sandy Mendenhall	
1985	Maxie	Himself	
1993	Save Me	Jim Stevens	
1993	Under Investigation	Detective Harry Keaton	
1994	Ebbtide	Jeff Warren	
1997	Allie & Me	Dustin Halaburton	
1998	Frogs for Snakes	Klench	
2001	Perfume	Hancock	
2002	Shoot or Be Shot	Jack Yeager	
2002	Roads to Riches	Dan Smith	
2008	Strange Wilderness	Sky Pierson	
2015	Bleeding Heart	Ed	
2015	The Meddler	TV Dad	
2016	Director's Cut	Godfrey Winters	
2016	Rebirth	Gabe	
2016	The Bronx Bull	Lenny	
2018	No Alternative	William Harrison	
2023	80 for Brady	Dan O'Callahan	

=== Television films ===
Year	Title	Role	Notes
1987	Laguna Heat	Tom Shephard	
1989	Dinner at Eight	Larry Renault	
1990	Deceptions	Nick Gentry	
1991	Deadly Intentions... Again?	Charles Raynor	
1992	Deliver Them from Evil: The Taking of Alta View	Richard Worthington	
1993	Poisoned by Love: The Kern County Murders	Steve Catlin	Also known as Murder So Sweet
1994	In the Best of Families: Marriage, Pride & Madness	Fritz Klenner	
1995	Tom Clancy's 'OP Center'	Paul Hood	
1995	Her Deadly Rival	Jim Lansford	
1997	Badge of Betrayal	Sheriff Dave Ward	
1997	Night Sins	Chief Mitch Holt	
1998	Like Father, Like Santa	Tyler Madison	
1998	The Hunted	Doc Kovac	
1998	Stranger in Town	Jack	
1999	Silent Predators	Vic Rondelli	
2000	Quarantine	President Kempers	
2001	Sex, Lies and Obsession	Cameron Thomas	
2002	Disappearance	Jim Henley	
2002	L.A. Law: The Movie	Michael Kuzak	
2010	You Lucky Dog	Jim Rayborn	
2012	Christmas High School Reunion	Mr. Taylor	
2012	Shadow of Fear	Richard Steele	

=== Television series ===
Year	Title	Role	Notes
1979	Studs Lonigan	Bill 'Studs' Lonigan	3 episodes
1984	Master of the Game	Anthony James 'Tony' Blackwell	3 episodes
1985	Space	John Pope	5 episodes
1986–91	L.A. Law	Michael Kuzak	102 episodes
1988	Favorite Son	Senator Terry Fallon	Episode: "Part One"
1992	Batman: The Animated Series	Anthony Romulus, Cameron Kaiser	Voice, 2 episodes
1992	The Legend of Prince Valiant	Sir Lymon	Voice, episode: "The Traitor"
1997	Ink	Brian	4 episodes
1997	The Nanny	Professor Steve	Episode: "Educating Fran"
1998	The Outer Limits	Ford Maddox	Episode: "Monster'
1999–2000	Movie Stars	Reese Hardin	21 episodes
2001	Touched by an Angel	Liam	Episode: "Winners, Losers & Leftovers"
2004–06	Veronica Mars	Aaron Echolls	12 episodes
2005	Arrested Development	Himself	Episode: "For British Eyes Only"
2007	Law & Order	Randall Bailey	Episode: "The Family Hour"
2009	Harper's Island	Uncle Marty Dunn	2 episodes
2010–11	Army Wives	Professor Chandler	8 episodes
2010	Harry Loves Lisa	Himself	2 episodes
2011	Curb Your Enthusiasm	Dino	Episode: "The Smiley Face"
2011	Franklin & Bash	Rick Paxton	Episode: "Bro-Bono"
2012–14	Shameless	Lloyd "Ned" Lishman	8 episodes
2013–14	Mad Men	Jim Cutler	15 episodes
2014	Rush	Dr. Warren Rush	4 episodes
2014–15	Law & Order: Special Victims Unit	Chief Charles Patton	2 episodes
2014–22	The Real Housewives of Beverly Hills	Himself	Appearing as Lisa Rinna's husband (guest)
2015	Glee	Walter	4 episodes
2016	Mom	Fred Hayes	2 episodes
2016–17	Graves	Jonathan Dalton	5 episodes
2017–18	Shooter	Addison Hayes	3 episodes
2017	Law & Order True Crime	Barry Levin	2 episodes
2018	Angie Tribeca	Leonard Scholls	Episode: "Heading to the Legal Beagle"
2021	Bless the Harts	Rod	Voice, episode: "Hot Tub-Tation"
2021	The Hot Zone: Anthrax	Tom Brokaw	2 episodes
2022	Flowers in the Attic: The Origin	Mr. Winfield	Episode: "Part One: The Marriage"
2023–present	Mayfair Witches	Cortland Mayfair	Main role

=== Video games ===
Year	Title	Role	Notes
2007	God of War II	Perseus	

== Awards and nominations ==
Year	Association	Category	Nominated work	Result
1979	Golden Globe Awards	New Star of the Year – Actor	Movie Movie	Nominated
1988	Golden Globe Awards	Best Actor – Television Series Drama	L.A. Law	Nominated
1989	Golden Globe Awards	Best Actor – Television Series Drama	L.A. Law	Nominated
1990	Golden Globe Awards	Best Actor – Television Series Drama	L.A. Law	Nominated
2013	Primetime Emmy Awards	Outstanding Guest Actor in a Drama Series	Mad Men	Nominated
