= Shoot or Be Shot =

- Directed by: J. Randall Argue
- Screenplay by: J. Randall Argue; Steve Catanzaro; Alistair Salton
- Produced by: J. Randall Argue; Ralph Linhardt; Michael Tarzian; Ralph Winter
- Starring: William Shatner; Harry Hamlin; Scott Rinker; Julianne Christie; Marcus Ashley
- Cinematography: Ralph Linhardt
- Edited by: Tom Dignan; Rich Mikan
- Music by: Joseph Alfuso
- Production company: PorchLight Entertainment
- Distributed by: 20th Century Fox Home Entertainment
- Release date: January 25, 2002 (Minneapolis–Saint Paul)
- Running time: 90 minutes
- Country: United States
- Language: English
- Budget: $1.5 million

Shoot or Be Shot is a low-budget independent film that premiered in Minneapolis–Saint Paul, Minnesota on January 25, 2002. This comedy film satirizes the filmmaking movement Dogme 95. The idea for the film was inspired by The Producers and An Alan Smithee Film: Burn Hollywood Burn.

Shoot or Be Shot has a runtime of 90 minutes and was directed by J. Randall Argue. At the time of the film's theatrical release, two other films Shatner was involved with were nearing their release dates: Showtime, in which he acted as himself, and Groom Lake, which he directed.

== Premise ==
William Shatner stars in the film as Harvey Wilkes, a patient who escapes from a psychiatric hospital to a desert, kidnaps a film crew there, and forces them to make a movie.

== Release and reception ==
Shoot or Be Shot was released on DVD by 20th Century Fox Home Entertainment in May 2004. Ian Jane of DVD Talk gave the film a negative review, saying that the film is "just not funny". Michelle Fajkus of Hybrid Cinema, who also gave the film a negative review, wrote that the film promotes stereotypes with its use of stock characters, such as the dumb blonde. Jeff Strickler of the Star Tribune called the film "a low-rent version of Bowfinger".
