= Juliette Marshall =

American actress and playwright

- Occupations: Actress, playwright, solo performer
- Years active: 1979–present

Juliette Marshall is an American actress, playwright, and solo theatre performer known for autobiographical one-woman stage shows. Her theatre works include Something in Her Genes, Something in His Genes, and Shift Happens, which have been performed in Los Angeles and San Francisco theatre venues.

Marshall began her screen career in the late 1970s and appeared as one of the muses in the musical fantasy film Xanadu (1980). She has also appeared in films including King of the Mountain (1981), Eating (1990), and Mrs. Doubtfire (1993), as well as in television productions such as Poisoned by Love: The Kern County Murders (1993) and Nash Bridges.

== Early life ==
Marshall's father, Sidney Marshall, was born in the Bronx in 1928 and moved to California as a teenager. After attending the University of California, Los Angeles, he began working at the advertising agency Young & Rubicam and later rose to become chief executive of Y&R / Dentsu USA.

In the late 1970s she worked as a dance instructor, teaching disco and jazz dance classes for teenagers at the East Valley YMCA in North Hollywood.

== Career ==
Marshall began working professionally in film and television in the late 1970s. Among her earliest screen appearances were roles on the television series The White Shadow and Trapper John, M.D.. Around the same time she appeared as one of the mythological muses in the musical fantasy film Xanadu (1980), starring Olivia Newton-John. She later appeared in the drama King of the Mountain (1981) and the ensemble comedy film Eating (1990). In 1993 she appeared as Miranda's attorney in the comedy Mrs. Doubtfire, starring Robin Williams.

During the early 1990s Marshall became increasingly involved in theatre, particularly in the San Francisco Bay Area. She performed autobiographical solo pieces and comedic sketches at venues including The Marsh and Bindlestiff Studio. She also performed with the improvisational comedy group Skirts, which staged regular performances in San Francisco.

Marshall also appeared in ensemble theatre productions. In 1995 she played Candy Starr in a production of One Flew Over the Cuckoo's Nest at Marin Theatre Company. A review in the San Francisco Chronicle described her performance as “fragile, fluttery and very funny,” noting it as one of the highlights of the production.

By the mid-1990s Marshall had begun developing original solo shows based on personal experience and character comedy. One of her best-known works was Something in Her Genes (1997), written and performed by Marshall and directed by Mark W. Travis. The production was staged at the Court Theater in Los Angeles. A review in the Daily Bruin noted Marshall's ability to portray multiple characters in the production, describing how she “breathes life into seven characters” during the performance.

Marshall followed this with Something in His Genes (1999), a companion solo show presented at the Other Space at Santa Monica Playhouse. The autobiographical comedy recounts an unlikely romance that begins with a disastrous blind date and develops into an unexpected relationship. Coverage in the Los Angeles Times and other outlets highlighted Marshall's energetic physical comedy and character work in the one-woman production. The popularity of the show led to an extension of its run at Santa Monica Playhouse.

Following the success of these productions, Marshall continued to perform her solo work in Los Angeles theatre venues including the Odyssey Theatre, Hudson Theatre, and Santa Monica Playhouse, and appeared in events connected with the Los Angeles Theatre Festival. In 2001 she produced and hosted the Juliette Marshall Variety Hour at Santa Monica Playhouse.

Marshall continued writing for the stage in the 2000s. In 2004 she co-wrote the romantic comedy Dr. Tango with Anthony Caldarella and starred in the production at the Edgemar Center for the Arts in Santa Monica.

Her later solo show Shift Happens combined autobiographical storytelling with cabaret-style performance and explored themes of divorce, dating and personal reinvention. The show was performed at the Improv Comedy Lab in Los Angeles and later featured at the Los Angeles Women's Theatre Festival in 2010.

Marshall continued developing new solo theatre work during the 2010s, including Wavy and Blurry, which premiered at the Hollywood Fringe Festival in 2016.

== Filmography ==
=== Film ===
Year	Title	Role	Notes
1979	The Muppet Movie	Beauty pageant model	Uncredited
1980	Xanadu	Muse #5	
1981	King of the Mountain	Big Tom's girl	
1990	Eating	Party guest	
1993	Mrs. Doubtfire	Miranda's attorney	

=== Television ===
Year	Title	Role	Notes
1980	The White Shadow	Dancer	1 episode
1980	Trapper John, M.D.	Candy Striper #1	1 episode
1993	Poisoned by Love: The Kern County Murders	Lynda	Television film
1994	Web of Deception	Detective Adrienne Hays	Television film
1998	Nash Bridges	Beverly	1 episode

== Stage ==
Year	Production	Role	Venue
1993	Monday Night Marsh	Performer	The Marsh, San Francisco
1994	Solo Sunday Stars of Summer	Performer	Bindlestiff Studio, San Francisco
1995	One Flew Over the Cuckoo's Nest	Candy Starr	Marin Theatre Company
1996	From Here to Maternity	Writer / Performer	Cable Car Theater, San Francisco
1997	Something in Her Genes	Writer / Performer	Court Theater, Los Angeles
1999	Something in His Genes	Writer / Performer	Santa Monica Playhouse
2001	Juliette Marshall Variety Hour	Host	Santa Monica Playhouse
2004	Dr. Tango	Co-writer / Performer	Edgemar Center for the Arts
2010	Shift Happens at the Los Angeles Women's Theatre Festival	Performer	Electric Lodge
2016	Wavy and Blurry	Writer / Performer	Hollywood Fringe Festival
