= Poisoned by Love: The Kern County Murders =

1993 American television film

- Genre: Drama; Thriller
- Written by: Caliope Brattlestreet; Stephen Glantz
- Directed by: Larry Peerce
- Starring: Harry Hamlin; Helen Shaver; K.T. Oslin; Terence Knox; Ed Lauter; Frances Lee McCain; Daphne Ashbrook; William Lucking; Faith Ford; Eileen Brennan
- Music by: Steve Dorff
- Country of origin: United States
- Original language: English

Production
- Executive producer: Jennifer Alward
- Producer: Richard Briggs
- Cinematography: Tony Imi
- Editors: Michael Berman; Harvey Stambler
- Production companies: Hearst Entertainment Productions; Morgan Hill Films

Original release
- Network: CBS
- Release: February 2, 1993

Poisoned by Love: The Kern County Murders, also known as Murder So Sweet, (1993) is an American TV movie starring Harry Hamlin and Helen Shaver that aired on CBS on February 2, 1993. It is based on the real-life murders carried out by Steven David Catlin that occurred in Bakersfield, California in the 1980s.

== Plot ==
Steve Catlin was known as a womanizer. After his new bride dies in mysterious circumstances, his former wife, Edie Ballew, questions whether that reputation was accurate. Acting on little more than a suspicion, and with help from an out-of-town detective, Edie secretly gathers clues that implicate her ex-husband as a methodical killer.

== Cast ==
- Harry Hamlin as Steve Catlin
- Helen Shaver as Edie Ballew
- K.T. Oslin as Candy
- Terence Knox as Bobby Ballew
- Ed Lauter as Glen Emory
- Frances Lee McCain as Bea Emory
- Daphne Ashbrook as Dyna
- William Lucking as Detective Sandy Harris
- Faith Ford as Joyce Catlin
- Eileen Brennan as Martha Catlin
- Juliette Marshall as Lynda
- Michael Bowen as Detective Culberton
- Steven Anthony Jones as Dr. Fortin
- James Hawley Rickman as John Ballew
- Ed Hooks as Lewis Berger
- Mario Yedidia as Glen Emory Jr.
- William Nilon as Sheriff Deputy (uncredited)
