= Soap Talk =

- Genre: Talk show
- Presented by: Ty Treadway; Lisa Rinna
- Country of origin: United States
- Original language: English

Production
- Running time: 60 minutes

Original release
- Network: SOAPnet
- Release: 2002 – 2006

Soap Talk is a television talk show on SOAPnet hosted by Lisa Rinna and Ty Treadway. It debuted in 2002 and ended in 2006. The reason for the show's cancellation was due to SOAPnet expanding its programming away from a soap opera-related focus.

== History ==
Lisa Rinna was chosen to host the show after executives at ABC (which owned SOAPnet) were impressed by her on-screen auditions to take over the spot left open by Kathie Lee Gifford on Live with Regis and Kathie Lee. She was actually Regis Philbin's first choice, but the network went with then ABC Daytime soap star Kelly Ripa. Rinna also had a background in soaps. She was Billie Reed on NBC Daytime's Days of Our Lives in the 1990s, as well as a stint on Melrose Place. Ty Treadway was starring on One Life to Live at the time.

The show taped at ABC Prospect Studios in Hollywood, California. Treadway lived on the east coast and had to fly in every weekend. The show taped three episodes on Saturdays and then three more on Sundays before changing it to taping on Friday and Saturday.

The show's format was almost always the same. Much like Live with Regis & Kelly, Lisa and Ty would come out, take a seat, drink coffee and discuss what was going in the world. Topics ranged from the world of soap operas, television in general, movies, celebrities, and the lives of the two hosts. After that a soap star would come out and give an interview. They would also do cooking segments from time to time as well as fashion shows, instructions from experts on skin and health care, and would often have editors from Soap Opera Digest come out to discuss the state of daytime.

On the occasion that either presenter was unavailable, another soap star would fill in. Alison Sweeney, Melissa Reeves and Catherine Hickland often filled in for Rinna, among others including Melody Thomas Scott and Hillary B. Smith. Extra's Jerry Penacoli or All My Children's Cameron Mathison would often fill in for Treadway.

The show frequently went on location as well. Soap Talk filmed a week's worth of episodes in Hawaii and would also film live from Super Soap Weekend at Disney World in Florida and at Disney California Adventure Park in Anaheim, California. Rinna and Treadway also hosted an annual show for ABC Daytime that would air in place of The View called ABC Soaps Present: Soap Secrets.

Soap Talk would occasionally dedicate an entire episode to a single soap opera. In celebration of SOAPNet getting Another World reruns, Linda Dano hosted an episode full of former stars of the soap. In celebration of having reruns of the television series Dallas, they had most of the original cast reunite. As shows would celebrate anniversaries they would do these types of shows and sometimes bring in ex-members from the shows such as Days of Our Lives, General Hospital, One Life to Live and The Young and the Restless.

Soap Talk was also used by soap stars to make the first public announcement of various personal news. Actress Jennifer Finnigan announced on the show that she would be leaving her three-time Daytime Emmy Award-winning role of Bridget Forrester on The Bold and the Beautiful. Tracey E. Bregman from The Young and the Restless premiered her fashion line on the show as well. Alison Sweeney revealed she was having a baby boy.
