= Center for Head Injury Services =

American health organization

- Founded: 1986
- Type: Charitable
- Purpose: Rehabilitation counseling and independent living services for disabled persons
- Location: Maryland Heights, Missouri, U.S.
- Region served: St. Louis area
- Key people: Donna Gunning (Executive Director)
- Website: www.headinjuryctr-stl.org

The Center for Head Injury Services was a nonprofit organization in St. Louis, Missouri which serves people who are living with a brain injury or disability. In 2024 the organization was sold to Rise. The organization provided community-based programs including therapies, counseling, vocational and employment services, adult day services and social enterprises. Among all clients placed in jobs, 90% are still in that job after 3 months. One of the organization's social enterprises, Destination Desserts, has received attention for its approach to employment solutions for disabled people. The Center for Head Injury Services is a 501(c)(3) organization governed by a board of directors and led by an executive director.

In 2011, actor Gary Busey selected the Center for Head Injury Services as his charity while competing on the reality television show Celebrity Apprentice 4. Busey, who survived a motorcycle accident in December 1988 that resulted in a severe brain injury, was able to raise $40,000 for the Center for Head Injury Services before being fired in episode 7.
