= Lisa Rinna =

American actress and television personality (born 1963)

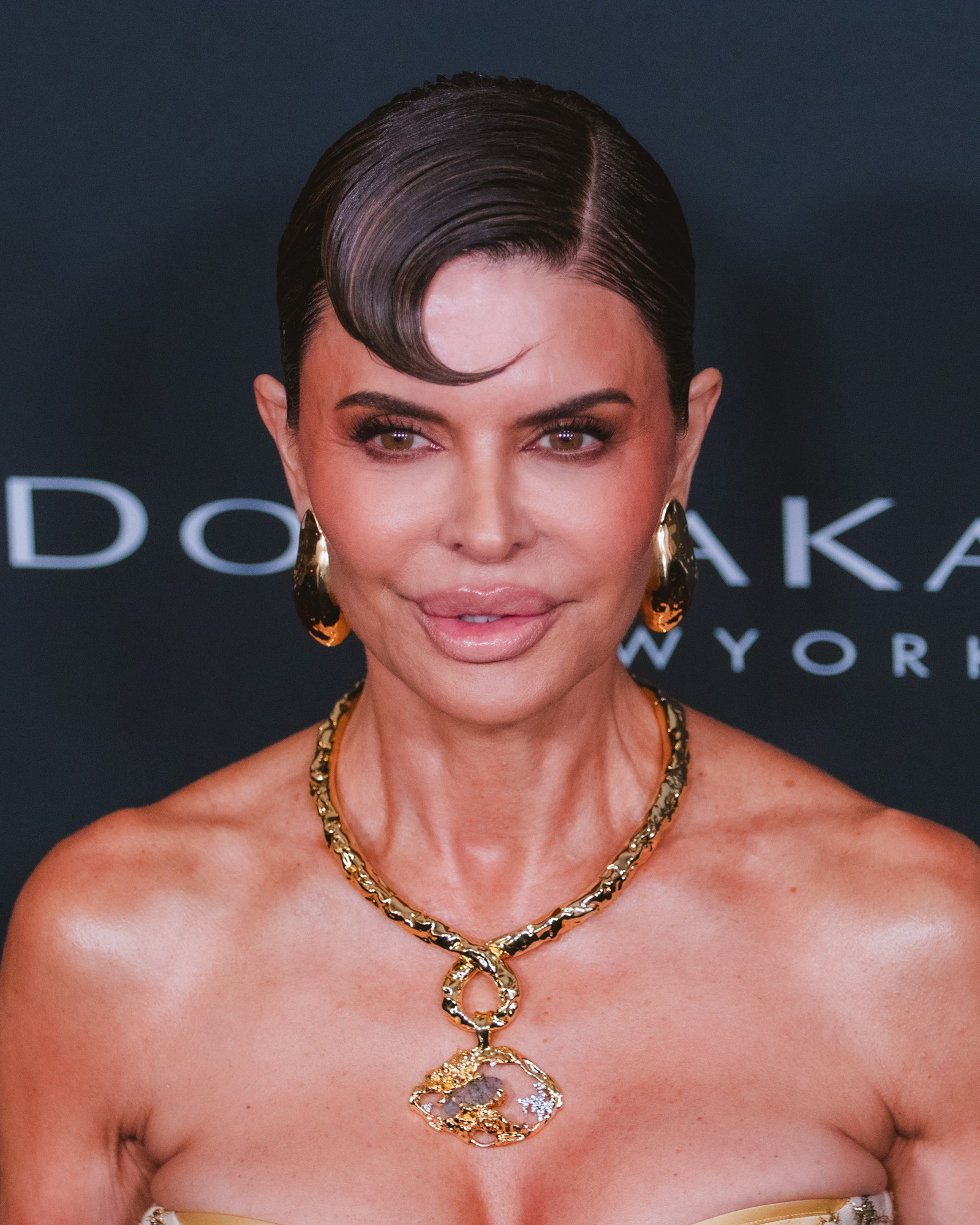
- Rinna in 2026
- Born: July 11, 1963 (age 63); Newport Beach, California, U.S.
- Occupations: Actress; television personality; model
- Years active: 1985–present
- Known for: The Real Housewives of Beverly Hills; Days of Our Lives; Melrose Place; The Traitors
- Spouse: Harry Hamlin (m. 1997)
- Children: Delilah Belle Hamlin; Amelia Gray Hamlin
- Website: lisarinna.com

Lisa Rinna (born July 11, 1963) is an American actress, television personality, author, and model. She portrayed Billie Reed on the NBC daytime soap opera Days of Our Lives and Taylor McBride on Fox's television drama Melrose Place. Between 2014 to 2022, Rinna starred on Bravo's reality television series The Real Housewives of Beverly Hills. Other television credits include being a contestant on NBC's The Celebrity Apprentice, ABC's Dancing with the Stars, and Peacock's The Traitors, as well as guest-starring roles on Entourage, Hannah Montana, Veronica Mars, Community, The Middle, and American Horror Stories. Rinna made her Broadway debut in Chicago as Roxie Hart in June 2007.

She was the host of Soapnet's talk show Soap Talk (2002–2006), for which she earned four Emmy nominations for Outstanding Talk Show Host. Rinna has written four books: the self-help and lifestyle book Rinnavation: Getting Your Best Life Ever (2009); the novel Starlit (2010); the sexual health guide The Big, Fun, Sexy Sex Book (2012); and the memoir You Better Believe I'm Gonna Talk About It (2026). Her other ventures include a fashion line for QVC named The Lisa Rinna Collection, the cosmetics collection Rinna Beauty, and the beverage company Rinna Wines.

== Early life ==
Lisa Deanna Rinna Hamlin was born July 11, 1963, in Newport Beach, California, to Lois Irene (née DeAndrade) and Frank Rinna. She is of Portuguese and Italian descent. Before Lisa's birth, her mother was brutally attacked by American serial killer David Carpenter, with whom she had worked. Lois was saved by a military police officer, who followed Carpenter's car after it went in a prohibited area. When Lisa was seven, her older half-sister Laurene died. During that same year, her family relocated to Medford, Oregon, when her father was transferred there for job-related reasons, and she spent the remainder of her childhood there. Rinna graduated from North Medford High School in 1981.

== Career ==
=== 1984–1999: Career beginnings and early work in soap opera ===
After graduating from high school, Rinna moved to San Francisco to pursue a career as a model. She started her career by appearing in commercials and believed she obtained her SAG card "doing a Mervyn's commercial". At age 21, Rinna appeared in the music video for John Parr's single "Naughty Naughty," as the passenger in Parr's car. Rinna later made her television debut appearing as the girlfriend of Jason Bateman's character in several episodes of The Hogan Family in 1990.

Rinna achieved her breakthrough in 1992, after she landed the role of Billie Reed in the NBC soap opera Days of Our Lives. Her portrayal of Billie earned her the award for Outstanding Female Newcomer at the 1994 Soap Opera Digest Awards. In 1995, she and Robert Kelker-Kelly won the award for Hottest Soap Couple at the 1995 Soap Opera Digest Awards. She departed from Days the same year. She transitioned into primetime television in 1996, portraying Taylor McBride on the Aaron Spelling-produced soap opera Melrose Place until 1998.

In 1998, Rinna, while six months pregnant with her first daughter, posed nude for the Playboy magazine pictorial "Melrose Mom," (its title paid tribute to her role in Melrose Place) for the September issue. She later recounted the instructions given to her by Playboy photographer Deborah Anderson: "'I do not want you long and sinewy and angular and muscular. I want you soft...' This was really hard for me because being 35 years old and posing for Playboy, you want to amp it up."

Through the late 1990s, Rinna appeared in a series of television films, including Lifetime's Sex, Lies & Obsession opposite her husband Harry Hamlin, based on Hamlin's real life sex addiction and alcoholism.

=== 2000–2013: Continued work in television and hosting ===
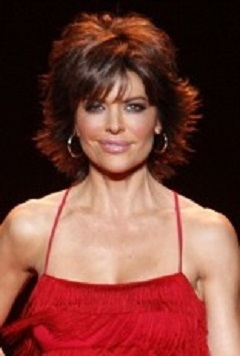
Rinna in 2008

In 2000, Rinna starred in the Lifetime film, Another Woman's Husband, which boasted one of the highest ratings for a movie on Lifetime since 1999. In 2001, Rinna played the role of Veronica Simpson in the comedy film Good Advice, which starred Charlie Sheen and Denise Richards.

From 2002 to 2006, Rinna co-hosted the Soapnet flagship daily lifestyle talk show Soap Talk alongside Ty Treadway; the show went to receive four consecutive Daytime Emmy Award nominations for their work. In 2003, Rinna began hosting Lifetime's home makeover program Merge (2003–2005), as well as hosted The 18th Annual Soap Opera Digest Awards with Soap Talk co-host Ty Treadway.

In 2004, Rinna guest-starred on the ABC sitcom 8 Simple Rules and the CW drama Veronica Mars, playing the recurring role of Lynn Echolls on the latter. In 2006, Rinna competed in the second season of Dancing with the Stars with professional dancer Louis van Amstel. She was eliminated in round seven based on audience voting, despite having higher marks from the judges than fellow celebrity dancer Jerry Rice. She was a regular guest co-host on Live with Regis and Kelly. In 2007, she portrayed Drama's ex-girlfriend Donna Devaney on HBO's Entourage, in the episode "Malibooty."

Throughout the summer of 2007, Rinna starred as Roxie Hart in the Broadway production of Chicago alongside her husband, who played the role of Billy Flynn. She also hosted Oxygen's Tease, a reality competition series for hairstylists. From 2007 to 2009, she was the host of TV Guide Network's awards season red carpet coverage, replacing Joan Rivers.

In 2008, she guest starred in Disney Channel's musical comedy television series Hannah Montana, in the role of Mr. Dontzig's cousin, Francesca. That same year, she released a series of workout videos called Dance Body Beautiful. In December, TV Guide reported that Rinna and Hamlin had signed a deal to create a reality television series based on their family life. The series, titled Harry Loves Lisa, premiered on TV Land on October 6, 2010, and ran for 6 episodes.

In 2009, Rinna campaigned for her reprisal of Taylor McBride on the CW's revival Melrose Place, however, the series was cancelled after only one season. In May 2009, she posed again for Playboy and once again was also its cover model. She also graced the covers of CVLUX, Living Well, Soap Opera Magazine and Soap Opera Digest.

In 2011, Rinna competed in the fourth season of the reality competition series The Celebrity Apprentice; she was eliminated after being the project manager on the second task, writing and performing a children's book. In May, she guest starred on Nickelodeon's musical sitcom Big Time Rush as James Maslow's character's mother, Brooke Diamond.

Rinna and her husband Harry Hamlin jointly owned the Belle Gray clothing boutique in Sherman Oaks, California in 2011. They closed the store in 2012 because, both had grown too busy with their respective acting careers to manage it.

In 2012, Rinna appeared in an infomercial for abdominal muscle toner "The Flex Belt" alongside Adrianne Curry, Denise Richards and Janet Evans. She has appeared in a television commercial for Taco Bell and an infomercial for Winsor Pilates. In 2012 to benefit the charity Dress for Success, she modeled an adult incontinence brief made by Depend under a tight-fitting evening gown. According to reports, Depend paid her $2 million to be their celebrity spokesperson.

In April 2012, Rinna brought her collection to QVC as the Lisa Rinna Collection. In 2013, she returned to The Celebrity Apprentice for its "All-Stars" season.

=== 2014–present: Further appearances in reality television ===
In 2014, Rinna appeared as one of the contestants on ABC's game show Sing Your Face Off. The same year, she joined the main cast of The Real Housewives of Beverly Hills for the show's fifth season. Her casting is often credited with 'saving' the series midway through its run, delivering a substantial boost in ratings. She acknowledged in a 2019 Los Angeles Times interview that being a Housewife brought her unprecedented attention: "I've never been more famous than I am at this point, because of the show."

In June 2019, Rinna launched an activewear collaboration with retailer Goldsheep. Proceeds from the collaboration benefited The Trevor Project, a national organization providing crisis intervention and suicide-prevention services to LGBTQ youth. In September 2019, she walked the runway for Kyle Richards' and Shahida Clayton's new women's clothing brand at New York Fashion Week.

In September 2020, Rinna announced that she will be launching Rinna Beauty, with its lip kits named Birthday Suit, Legends Only, and No Apologies.

In 2021, Rinna reprised her role of Billie Reed for a special Peacock miniseries, Days of Our Lives: Beyond Salem, alongside costars Deidre Hall, Eileen Davidson, and Jackée Harry. She has continued to appear in television roles, with guest parts on series including C.S.I., The Middle, The Guest Book, Awkward. and This Close.

In August 2022, Rinna announced on an episode of The Real Housewives of Beverly Hills she is in the process of entering the alcoholic beverage industry with a product called Rinna Rosé.

On January 6, 2023, Rinna announced her departure from The Real Housewives of Beverly Hills after eight seasons. She appeared as a regular guest co-host on CBS's The Talk throughout the year. In June, she guest starred in episodes on So Help Me Todd, Lopez vs. Lopez, and American Horror Stories. She also co-starred with daughter Delilah Belle Hamlin in the Lifetime television film Mommy Meanest, loosely based on the true story of Kendra Gail Licari.

In 2026, Rinna competed in the fourth season of the Emmy-winning competition series The Traitors. She won Female Star of the Year for her performance on The Traitors at the Critics' Choice Awards. That same year, she will appear alongside RuPaul in the theatrical comedy film Stop! That! Train!. She also appeared in the second season of Running Point, as herself.

Beginning November 2026, she will be returning to Broadway as Lana Sherwood/Violet Bick in It's a Wonderful Life A Radio Play, performing alongside her husband Harry Hamlin at the Broadhurst Theatre.

== Personal life ==
Rinna married actor Harry Hamlin on March 29, 1997, in Beverly Hills, California. They have two daughters, Delilah Belle and Amelia Gray.

She has acknowledged having plastic surgery and having silicone, Botox, and Juvéderm injections.

On November 15, 2021, Rinna announced that her mother Lois, who was featured in The Real Housewives franchise, died of a stroke. Lois Rinna had survived being attacked by the Trailside serial killer David Carpenter in 1960, three years before Lisa was born.

== Filmography ==
Year	Title	Role	Notes
1988	Captive Rage	Lucy Delacorte	
1990	Monday Morning	Susan Pevensie	
1990	The Hogan Family	Annie Derrick	4 episodes
1991	Lies Before Kisses	Adrianne Arness	TV movie
1991	Shades of L.A.	Holly	Episode: "Send Up the Clowns"
1991	Baywatch	Kelly	Episode: "Thin or Die"
1992	Night Sins	Billie Reed	TV movie
1992–1995, 2002–2003, 2012–2013, 2018	Days of Our Lives	Billie Reed	606 episodes
1993	Robot Wars	Annie	
1994	Winter Heat	Billie Reed	TV movie
1995	Vanished	Marielle Delauney	TV movie
1996–1998	Melrose Place	Taylor McBride	Main cast; 66 episodes
1997	Close to Danger	Jennifer Cole	TV movie
1998	House Rules	Cassiopa "Cassie" Devine	Episode: "Pilot"
1998	Nick Fury: Agent of S.H.I.E.L.D.	Contessa Valentina "Val" Allegra de Fontaine	TV movie
2000	Another Woman's Husband	Laurel McArthur	TV movie
2000	Movie Stars	Amy Wells Hunter	Episode: "The Seduction of Reese Hardin"
2001	Oh, Baby	Michelle Grant	TV movie
2001	Sex, Lies & Obsession	Joanna Thomas	TV movie
2001	Good Advice	Veronica Simpson	
2002	My Adventures in Television	Samantha	Episode: "The Chinese Baby"
2002–2006	Soap Talk	Herself / co-host	Main cast; 104 episodes
2003–2005	Merge	Herself / co-host	Main cast; 56 episodes
2004	8 Simple Rules	Holly	Episode: "YMCA"
2004–2005	Veronica Mars	Lynn Echolls	3 episodes
2006	Dancing with the Stars	Herself	Season 2
2006	Wheel of Fortune	Herself	Soap Stars Week; Episode 2
2006–2023	Live with Regis and Kelly	Herself / Guest / Guest Co-Host	24 episodes
2007	Tease	Herself / Host	
2007	Entourage	Donna Devaney	Episode: "Malibooty"
2008	Hannah Montana	Francesca	Episode: "Killing Me Softly with His Height"
2010	Community	Chantelle Cahill	Episode: "The Art of Discourse"
2010	Harry Loves Lisa	Herself	Main role; 6 episodes
2010	The Real Housewives of New York City	Herself	Episode: "Fashion and Fighting"
2010–2020	RuPaul's Drag Race	Herself / Guest Judge	2 episodes
2011	Big Time Rush	Brooke Diamond	Episode: "Big Time Moms"
2011	The Celebrity Apprentice 4	Herself	Season 11
2013	All-Star Celebrity Apprentice	Herself	Season 13
2013	The Tonight Show with Jay Leno	Amanda's Mother	Episode: "Episode #22.22"
2014	Sing Your Face Off	Herself	Contestant; season 1
2014	Awkward	Eva Mansfield	Episode: "Snow Job: Part 1"
2014–2022	The Real Housewives of Beverly Hills	Herself	Main role; 180 episodes
2015	Bound & Babysitting	Jane	TV movie
2015	The Real Housewives of Orange County	Herself	Episode: "Suspicious Minds"
2015	C.S.I.: Crime Scene Investigation	Tori Nolan	Episode: "Under My Skin"
2015	The Hotwives of Las Vegas	Kendra	Episode: "What Happens in Vegas... Seriously, What Happens There?"
2017	The Middle	Tammy Brooks	Episode: "Meet the Parents"
2017	Grannie	Miss Hanigan	Short film
2018	The Guest Book	Loretta	Episode: "Invisible Son"
2019	This Close	Priscilla	Episode: "Three's Company"
2020	Celebrity Family Feud	Herself	Episode: "Andy Cohen vs. Real Housewives of Beverly Hills and Kevin Nealon vs. Drew Carey"
2021	Days of Our Lives: Beyond Salem	Billie Reed	Main role; 5 episodes
2021	The Shrink Next Door	Lisa Rinna	2 episodes
2021	The Prince	Lisa Rinna	Episodes: "Playdate" and "Beverly Hills"
2022	The Great North	Lisa Rinna	Episode: "Dances with Wolfs Adventure"
2023	American Horror Stories	Sheila Klein	Episode: "Tapeworm"
2023	The Talk	Herself / Guest Co-Host	9 episodes
2024	So Help Me Todd	Jennifer Gianola	Episode: "Iceland Was Horrible"
2024	Mommy Meanest	Madelyn	TV movie
2024	Lopez vs Lopez	Lisa Perry	Episode: "Lopez vs Lisa"
2024	Canada's Drag Race: Canada vs. the World	Herself / Guest Judge	Season 2, Episode 2: "The Hole"
2025	King of Drag	Judge	Episode: "Showbiz"
2026	The Traitors	Herself	Season 4
2026	Running Point	Lisa Rinna	
2026	Stop! That! Train!	Sceney Celebrity	

=== Theater ===
Year	Title	Role	Venue
2007	Chicago	Roxie Hart (replacement)	Ambassador Theatre, Broadway
2026	It's a Wonderful Life A Radio Play	Lana Sherwood / Violet Bick & Others	Broadhurst Theatre, Broadway

== Bibliography ==
List of books
Date of publication	Title
2009	Rinnavation: Getting Your Best Life Ever
2010	Starlit: A Novel
2012	The Big, Fun, Sexy Sex Book
2026	You Better Believe I'm Gonna Talk About It

== Awards and nominations ==
Year	Award	Category	Title of work	Result
1994	Soap Opera Digest Award	Outstanding Female Newcomer	Days of Our Lives	Won
1995	Soap Opera Digest Award	Hottest Soap Couple	Days of Our Lives	Won
2003	Daytime Emmy Awards	Outstanding Talk Show Host	Soap Talk	Nominated
2005	Daytime Emmy Awards	Outstanding Talk Show Host	Soap Talk	Nominated
2006	Daytime Emmy Awards	Outstanding Talk Show Host	Soap Talk	Nominated
2007	Daytime Emmy Awards	Outstanding Talk Show Host	Soap Talk	Nominated
2026	Critics' Choice Real TV Awards	Female Star of The Year	The Traitors	Won
