= The Apprentice (American TV series) season 11 =

The Apprentice
- Season 11
- No. of contestants: 16
- Winner: John Rich
- Runner-up: Marlee Matlin
- No. of episodes: 12

Release
- Original network: NBC
- Original release: March 6 – May 22, 2011

Additional information
- Filming dates: October 18, 2010 – May 22, 2011

Season chronology
- ← Previous; Season 10 Next → Season 12

The Celebrity Apprentice 4 (also known as The Apprentice 11) is the eleventh installment of the reality game show The Celebrity Apprentice, which premiered March 6, 2011. Country music star John Rich was named the winner defeating actress Marlee Matlin. Lil Jon, La Toya Jackson, Gary Busey, and Lisa Rinna all returned for All-Star Celebrity Apprentice. Jackson and Busey placed twelfth and sixth, respectively, and both won $20,000 for their charities while Lil Jon and Rinna were both semifinalists placing third and fourth, respectively; Jon raised $160,000 and Rinna raised $504,500 resulting in her improving immensely from her first season.

== Candidates ==
The candidates were divided into two teams, males versus females. The women named their team A.S.A.P., an acronym for Artists, Singers, Authors, and Professionals for a Purpose. The men named their team Backbone.

Celebrity	Background	Original team	Age	Hometown	Charity	Result	Raised
John Rich	Singer-songwriter	Backbone	37	Dickson, Tennessee	St. Jude Children's Research Hospital	The Celebrity Apprentice (5–22–2011)	$1,261,908
Marlee Matlin	Film & television actress	A.S.A.P.	45	Arlington Heights, Illinois	The Starkey Hearing Foundation	Fired in the season finale (5–22–2011)	$1,050,000
Meat Loaf	Singer	Backbone	63	Dallas, Texas	The Painted Turtle	Fired in task 12 (5–15–2011)	$204,580
Lil Jon	Rapper & entrepreneur	Backbone	40	Atlanta, Georgia	The United Methodist Children's Home of North Georgia Conference	Fired in task 12 (5–15–2011)	$80,000
Star Jones	Former The View panelist	A.S.A.P.	49	Trenton, New Jersey	American Heart Association	Fired in task 11 (5–08–2011)	$169,372
La Toya Jackson	Singer, author & businesswoman	A.S.A.P.	54	Gary, Indiana	AIDS Project L.A.	Fired in task 8 & 10^{1} (05–08–2011)	$65,000
NeNe Leakes	The Real Housewives of Atlanta star	A.S.A.P.	43	Athens, Georgia	Atlanta Mission: My Sister's House	Quit in task 10 (5–08–2011)	
Hope Dworaczyk	Playboy model	A.S.A.P.	26	Port Lavaca, Texas	Best Buddies	Fired in task 9 (5–01–2011)	$20,000
Gary Busey	Actor	Backbone	66	Goose Creek, Texas	The Center for Head Injury Services	Fired in task 7 (4–17–2011)	$40,000
Mark McGrath	Sugar Ray singer & television host	Backbone	43	Newport Beach, California	Save the Music Foundation	Fired in task 6 (4–10–2011)	
Richard Hatch	Survivor winner	Backbone	49	Newport, Rhode Island	Grassroot Soccer	Fired in task 5 (4–03–2011)	
Jose Canseco	Former MLB outfielder	Backbone	46	Havana, Cuba	Baseball Assistance Team (B.A.T.)	Quit in task 5 (4–03–2011)	$25,000
Dionne Warwick	Singer	A.S.A.P.	70	East Orange, New Jersey	The Hunger Project	Fired in task 4 (3–27–2011)	
Niki Taylor	Model	A.S.A.P.	36	Pembroke Pines, Florida	American Red Cross	Fired in task 3 (3–20–2011)	$35,000
Lisa Rinna	Television host & actress	A.S.A.P.	47	Medford, Oregon	Entertainment Industry Foundation: Women's Cancer Research Fund	Fired in task 2 (3–13–2011)	
David Cassidy	Actor & singer	Backbone	60	West Orange, New Jersey	The Alzheimer's Research and Prevention Foundation	Fired in task 1 (3–6–2011)	

== Weekly results ==
Candidate	Original team	Task 10 team	Final Task team	Application result	Record as project manager
John Rich	Backbone	Backbone	Backbone	The Celebrity Apprentice	2–1 (win in tasks 8 & 11, loss in task 5)
Marlee Matlin	A.S.A.P.	A.S.A.P.	A.S.A.P.	Fired in the season finale	1–1 (win in task 5, loss in task 11)
Meat Loaf	Backbone	A.S.A.P	A.S.A.P.	Fired in task 12	2–0 (win in tasks 2 & 10)
Lil Jon	Backbone	Backbone	Backbone	Fired in task 12	2–0 (win in tasks 4 & 9)
Star Jones	A.S.A.P.	A.S.A.P.	Backbone	Fired in task 11	1–1 (win in task 1, loss in task 8)
La Toya Jackson	A.S.A.P.	Backbone	A.S.A.P.	Fired in task 8 & 10^{1}	1–1 (win in task 6, loss in task 10)
NeNe Leakes	A.S.A.P.	Backbone		Quit in task 10	0–2 (loss in tasks 4 & 9)
Hope Dworaczyk	A.S.A.P.			Fired in task 9	1–0 (win in task 7)
Gary Busey	Backbone			Fired in task 7	1–1 (win in task 3, loss in task 7)
Mark McGrath	Backbone		Backbone	Fired in task 6	0–1 (loss in task 6)
Richard Hatch	Backbone		A.S.A.P.	Fired in task 5	0–1 (loss in task 1)
Jose Canseco	Backbone			Quit in task 5	
Dionne Warwick	A.S.A.P.			Fired in task 4	
Niki Taylor	A.S.A.P.			Fired in task 3	0–1 (loss in task 3)
Lisa Rinna	A.S.A.P.			Fired in task 2	0–1 (loss in task 2)
David Cassidy	Backbone			Fired in task 1	

^1La Toya Jackson was originally fired in task eight, but was brought back into the competition during the boardroom of task nine.

No.	Elimination chart													
No.	Candidate	1	2	3	4	5	6	7	8	9	10	11	12	13
1	John	IN	IN	IN	IN	LOSE	IN	IN	WIN	IN	IN	WIN	IN	CA
2	Marlee	IN	IN	IN	IN	WIN	IN	IN	IN	IN	IN	LOSE	IN	FIRED
3	Meat Loaf	IN	WIN	IN	IN	IN	IN	IN	IN	IN	WIN	BR	FIRED	
4	Lil Jon	IN	IN	IN	WIN	IN	IN	IN	IN	WIN	IN	IN	FIRED	
5	Star	WIN	BR	IN	IN	IN	IN	IN	LOSE	BR	IN	FIRED		
6	La Toya	IN	IN	IN	IN	IN	WIN	IN	FIRED	IN	FIRED			
7	NeNe	IN	IN	IN	LOSE	IN	IN	IN	BR	LOSE	QUIT			
8	Hope	IN	IN	IN	IN	IN	IN	WIN	IN	FIRED				
9	Gary	IN	IN	WIN	IN	IN	BR	FIRED						
10	Mark	IN	IN	IN	IN	IN	FIRED							
11	Richard	LOSE	IN	IN	IN	FIRED								
12	Jose	BR	IN	IN	IN	QUIT								
13	Dionne	IN	BR	IN	FIRED									
14	Niki	IN	IN	FIRED										
15	Lisa	IN	FIRED											
16	David	FIRED												

The contestant on the losing team.
The contestant won as project manager on his/her team.
The contestant lost as project manager on his/her team.
The contestant was on the losing team and brought to the final boardroom.
The contestant was fired.
The contestant lost as project manager and was fired.
The contestant withdrew from the show.
The contestant did not participate in the task.
The contestant winner of the competition.

== Episodes ==
=== Episode 1: Pepperoni Profit ===
Task 1

- Air date: March 6, 2011
- Task scope: To sell pizzas and earn as much money as possible.
- Backbone project manager: Richard Hatch
- A.S.A.P. project manager: Star Jones
- Judges: Donald Trump; Ivanka Trump; Donald Trump Jr.
- Dramatic tension: On Backbone, Jose Canseco was put off by Richard Hatch's leadership, and when Richard felt that David Cassidy was being a distraction, he practically pushed him out of the way at one point. Richard eventually apologized for the incident, even though he touched David more than once. On A.S.A.P., Star Jones and Lisa Rinna did not get along, and Dionne Warwick was slow while she was manning the register. Lisa and Marlee Matlin struggled making all the deliveries that Star had made due to New York City traffic, and they were not able to make a $35,000 delivery that was personally arranged by Curtis Stone. In the boardroom, Star blamed Lisa for not making Stone's delivery, and called Lisa a "little girl". Also, Jose spoke out against Richard, calling him a liar and a bully, and claiming that Richard struck David.
- Winning team: A.S.A.P.
  - Reasons for win: Although they didn't make the $35,000 delivery from Curtis Stone, they earned $115,268 regardless, and had many celebrity donors.
- Losing team: Backbone
  - Reasons for loss: Although they had received celebrity donors from Richard Hatch, Lil Jon, John Rich, Mark McGrath, and Meat Loaf, the men only earned $54,104 and lost by $61,164. Jose Canseco and Gary Busey failed to bring in any donations at all, while David Cassidy only brought in a single, small donation from his daughter Katie.
  - Sent to boardroom: Richard Hatch, David Cassidy, and Jose Canseco
- Fired: David Cassidy – for not putting up a fight and not being as passionate about the task as Jose Canseco and Richard Hatch. Trump was unhappy with Richard's leadership, but fired David instead for not contributing enough to this task and for being unable to defend himself, relying on Jose to back him up against Richard in the boardroom. Although Richard was disrespectful to him, David did not take responsibility for his own actions which led to his dismissal.
  - Cameo appearances by Russell Simmons, Wendy Williams, Heidi Bressler, Marc Ecko, Ethan Zohn and Jenna Morasca.
- Notes:
  - Donald Trump asked Star Jones who her most valuable player was; she said Niki. Therefore, Trump gave Niki's charity the $35,000 which would have been given to Star's charity by Curtis Stone, had they made his delivery.
  - While Trump was critical of Canseco's failure to bring in any donors, he even more heavily criticised Richard Hatch for bringing him back after claiming during the initial boardroom that Jose worked the hardest on the task. Trump hinted that Gary Busey should have been brought back instead of Jose, since he had also failed to bring in any money and his attempt to promote the sale while playing the character of the "Pepperoni Prophet" had ultimately achieved nothing. Ultimately, Richard was spared due to his having been the top fundraiser on Backbone, and Trump having a policy of never firing the top fundraiser on a task.
  - Gary's phone went off at the start of the boardroom. Trump fired him, then less than half a second later said he was joking.

=== Episode 2: Child's Play ===
Task 2

- Airdate: March 13, 2011
- Task scope: Create a children's book and perform it to a group consisting of four to five year olds. The story must also revolve around at least one team member. The teams will be judged based on three criteria: originality, age appropriateness, and creativity.
- Backbone project manager: Meat Loaf
- A.S.A.P. project manager: Lisa Rinna
- Result: A.S.A.P came up with a story revolving around La Toya Jackson about a lion who couldn't roar. Backbone came up with a story based on Lil Jon about him becoming a superhero.
- Judges: Donald Trump; Eric Trump; Donald Trump Jr.
- Dramatic tension: Lisa Rinna lost control of her team early on and struggled to maintain any sort of harmony, which eventually culminated in Star Jones openly ridiculing Lisa's leadership just before their performance. Dionne Warwick caused additional friction by behaving in a condescending manner toward Marlee Matlin throughout the task, and instead of speaking directly to Marlee insisted on talking to her through her assistant Jack Jason, which infuriated her. There was also a major argument over who would be credited as the author, with Lisa wanting it to be credited to "Team A.S.A.P." and Star and Dionne feeling that they were the only ones deserving of credit (despite the original concept for the book actually having come from Hope Dworaczyk). On Backbone, Jose Canseco argued with John Rich over the details of the team's book, and then got into an argument with Meat Loaf after Jose and Gary Busey got lost on their way to the venue (though Meat Loaf mistakenly sent them to the wrong address.)
- Winning team: Backbone
  - Reasons for win: John Rich and Mark McGrath were able to effectively organize their book and performance, and despite criticism for Jose Canseco's wooden performance in the stage play and Meat Loaf's failure to actually show the book to the audience, guest judge Holly Robinson Peete thought their concept was very original, age appropriate and entertaining.
- Losing team: A.S.A.P.
  - Reasons for loss: Even though they gave a stellar performance on stage and had showcased their actual book to the audience (unlike Backbone), Holly Robinson Peete thought that their theme of "being yourself" was too sophisticated for children. In addition, the font on each page in the book was way too small for children (and even some of the adults) to read.
  - Sent to boardroom: Lisa Rinna, Star Jones, Dionne Warwick
  - Fired: Lisa Rinna – for having poor leadership skills, inability to control her team, losing the respect of her entire team, and for acknowledging that she crumbled under the pressure.
- Notes:
  - NeNe Leakes admitted during the episode that the team knew that Lisa Rinna would not be able to handle the role of being a project manager and that they were setting her up for failure.
  - Trump noted the difference in how the teams reacted prior to the result when he gave the teams copies of each other's book to read. While the women all found the men's book charming and Marlee Matlin even said she'd buy it for her kids, most of the men struggled to even read the women's book at all due to the small typeface, and the ones who could read it weren't impressed by it.
  - Meat Loaf won $20,000 for his charity. In addition, Trump told him that Backbone's story would be published as an eBook on Amazon.com, and any profits would also go to the charity.

=== Episode 3: Unhappy Campers ===
Task 3

- Airdate: March 20, 2011
- Task scope: The celebrities must create an outdoor camping experience.
- Task sponsor: Camping World
- Backbone project manager: Gary Busey
- A.S.A.P. project manager: Niki Taylor
- Result: The men selected the two bigger tour buses, while the women picked two RVs that were more family oriented.
- Judges: Donald Trump; Ivanka Trump; Donald Trump Jr.
- Dramatic tension: Both teams suffered from leadership troubles during the task. Niki Taylor proved indecisive and was hampered by her admitted lack of knowledge about RVs, resulting in Star Jones and La Toya Jackson taking over most of the creative decisions. On Backbone, Gary Busey did not even seem focused on the task at hand and spent most of the day playing baseball with Jose Canseco, resulting in the other men sharing out the workload among themselves.
- Winning team: Backbone
  - Reasons for win: While their interiors paled in comparison to A.S.A.P.'s, they had dynamic exteriors along with team members such as John Rich (who sang a song) and Jose Canseco (who tossed around a baseball with onlookers) contributing to the presentation. Overall, they showcased the company's image and a more outdoor camping experience better than A.S.A.P. did.
- Losing team: A.S.A.P.
  - Reasons for loss: Despite terrific interiors for the campers, their exteriors were bland due to an absence of greenery and signage. Their tours were also badly organized and they did not properly explain the features of the campers.
  - Sent to boardroom: No final boardroom – Niki humbly took responsibility for her team's loss, saying that all the other girls worked very hard and did an amazing job. She also said that she couldn't blame anyone else, even though Trump felt there were valid reasons for Niki to bring back both Dionne Warwick and Hope Dworaczyk (Niki had argued with Dionne several times in the task, while Ivanka and the Camping World executives both named Hope as the team's weakest performer). Trump admired Niki's integrity, but fired her on the spot.
  - Fired: Niki Taylor – for losing the task as project manager and taking total accountability for her team's failure.
- Notes:
  - Gary Busey won $40,000 for his charity
  - Gary Busey nearly exceeded Backbone's budget, which would have caused the team to automatically lose the task. Mark McGrath was able to avert this by negotiating to get an order of greenery for nothing, which brought the team back into budget.
  - The Camping World executives were very impressed by La Toya Jackson's speaking skills and product knowledge of the RVs, much to the annoyance of Star Jones, who felt that she was the strongest member of the team and was being short-changed on the credit. By contrast, the executives were extremely critical of Hope Dworaczyk's work in organizing the tours.

=== Episode 4: Off the Hook ===
Task 4

- Airdate: March 27, 2011
- Task scope: To produce a commercial for ACN's new video phone, the IRIS 5000.
- Task sponsor: ACN Inc.
- Backbone project manager: Lil Jon
- A.S.A.P. project manager: NeNe Leakes
- Result: Backbone made a humorous commercial involving an older couple on Christmas talking to their son and his gay lover, while A.S.A.P. made a heartfelt video of a girl in Paris communicating with her father and deaf mother.
- Judges: Donald Trump; Ivanka Trump; Donald Trump Jr.
- Dramatic tension: Dionne Warwick and Gary Busey continued to cause problems for their respective teams; Gary by lacking consistent focus and then inadvertently exposing himself during filming of Backbone's advert, and Dionne by repeatedly complaining about A.S.A.P.'s concept, then refusing to attend the team's editing session, claiming that she was too tired to do so.
- Winning team: Backbone
  - Reasons for win: Although the men took a comedic approach to their video and ran with a more risque concept, they earned 53% of the vote of the ACN representatives.
- Losing team: A.S.A.P.
  - Reasons for loss: While the women had a more heartwarming commercial, they had earned only 47% of the vote of the ACN representatives, losing by a 6% deficit.
  - Sent to boardroom: No final boardroom – Dionne Warwick took offense to the criticisms that NeNe Leakes and Hope Dworaczyk made about her work ethic and essentially volunteered to be fired. After some further discussion, Dionne retracted her remarks, but Trump told her that it was too late to do so.
  - Fired: Dionne Warwick – for implicating herself in the boardroom, stating that she would fire herself and hinting to Trump that he should, which insulted him.
- Notes:
  - Lil Jon won $40,000 for his charity.
  - Early in the boardroom there was a discussion of La Toya Jackson's role in the task, which had been severely curtailed due to her having an eye infection. Partly because of this, Star Jones and Marlee Matlin deemed her the weakest member of the team and hinted that she should be fired. Before any further discussion on the matter could take place, though, the subject of Dionne Warwick's contribution was raised, which ultimately led to Dionne's firing. Ivanka noted how foolish it was for Dionne to have volunteered herself to be fired, given that most of the prior criticism had been aimed at La Toya, and Trump felt that Dionne's tiredness was actually a valid reason for her not to attend the editing session.
  - After Dionne's firing, there was a major argument between her and NeNe Leakes before Dionne took the elevator down to the street. The two argued so loudly that even Trump, Ivanka and Donald Jr. (who were still in the boardroom) overheard it, and were taken aback.

=== Episode 5: The Art of the Deal ===
Task 5

- Airdate: April 3, 2011
- Task scope: Celebrities must create their own work(s) of art and sell them for charity.
- Backbone project manager: John Rich
- A.S.A.P. project manager: Marlee Matlin
- Judges: Donald Trump; George H. Ross; Donald Trump Jr.
- Quit: Jose Canseco - Shortly after the task began, Jose was informed that the health of his father Jose Sr., who was battling cancer, had significantly deteriorated, and that he was on the verge of death. After briefly meeting with Trump in the boardroom to confirm his departure, Jose left the show. Given the reason to his quitting, Trump gave Jose $25,000 for his charity. This was an Apprentice first, as Trump usually despises "quitters."
- Dramatic tension: Early in the day Meat Loaf exploded at Gary Busey, under the mistaken assumption that Gary had stolen his art supplies. John Rich eventually managed to defuse the situation and found the lost supplies, and Meat Loaf gave a heartfelt apology to Gary later on in the task.
- Winning team: A.S.A.P
  - Reasons for win: Despite setting up the gallery 5 minutes prior to opening, the team raised a total of $986,000. Every member of the team brought in huge amounts of money, with Marlee Matlin, Star Jones and La Toya Jackson in particular doing well, and even their lowest contributor, NeNe Leakes bringing in over $40,000.
- Losing team: Backbone
  - Reasons for loss: They raised over $626,000, but ended up losing by $360,000. Despite an overall strong effort, Backbone were simply outperformed massively by A.S.A.P., and in fact only even came as close to the women as they did because of a $470,000 donation from one of John Rich's contacts (their total without this donation would have been around $156,000). Richard Hatch and Gary Busey also brought in rather small amounts compared to the rest of the team.
  - Sent to boardroom: No final boardroom – Trump had even let the A.S.A.P. team stay during the internal review and advise Trump on whom to fire.
  - Firing verdict: Despite brief consideration being given to Meat Loaf due to the argument he caused early in the task, Richard Hatch and Gary Busey quickly became the obvious choices for bringing in the least money and being generally agreed to be the two weakest members of the team. Despite the men arguing that Richard would be stronger going forward, Marlee Matlin persuaded Trump that money raised should be the sole deciding factor. As Richard brought in less than half Gary's total, he was therefore fired.
  - Fired: Richard Hatch – for raising the least money in the task.
- Notes:
  - Before Jose Canseco left, Trump gave $25,000 to his charity. This was the third time on The Apprentice that a male celebrity decided to leave the show on the fifth episode. The others were Vincent Pastore in Season 7 and Michael Johnson in Season 9.
  - This was the first task in Apprentice history in which Trump kept the winning team in the boardroom and allowed them to advise him on the firing. Though Trump said that he could be persuaded not to fire anyone from Backbone, since Jose Canseco had already left for personal reasons, Marlee Matlin refused this notion and said that she did not believe the men would choose to spare her team from firing were their situations reversed.
  - The total amount raised for charity in this episode, including the totals of both teams and also the money given to Jose Canseco's and La Toya Jackson's charities, was $1,676,000, which is more than has previously been raised on any season in the show's history.
  - Because Marlee let John Rich keep the $626,000 he raised, Trump decided to level Marlee's earnings to an even $1 million, instantly giving her the record for the most money ever raised by a single contestant. The previous record holder had been Piers Morgan, who raised $754,000 in the first Celebrity Apprentice. This also made Matlin the first person to ever earn $1 million on the show. She held the record until the end of the season, when John Rich surpassed her total. If Marlee decided to keep the money for her own charity she would have been the highest fundraiser in the history of the entire show amongst every season.
  - La Toya Jackson won an award for having the "best hat", which earned her $25,000 for her charity. Her hat was dedicated to her brother, Michael.
  - John Rich made an Apprentice record by raising the most money from a single transaction by selling his guitar for $470,000.

=== Episode 6: Australian Gold ===
Task 6

- Airdate: April 10, 2011
- Task scope: The celebrities must promote a promotional display for the Australian Gold suntan lotion
- Task sponsor: Australian Gold
- Backbone project manager: Mark McGrath
- A.S.A.P. project manager: La Toya Jackson
- Judges: Donald Trump; Ivanka Trump; Donald Trump Jr.
- Winning team: A.S.A.P.
  - Reasons for win: Even though the executives thought the team did not utilize their team as well as they could have (specifically not having Hope Dworaczyk as their model, which would better promote the product and draw a larger crowd), they liked the integration of different sports and seasonal themes, along with the company theme ("live the gold life") and their live mascot, Sydney the Koala.
- Losing team: Backbone
  - Reasons for loss: Despite liking a song that the men created, and the draw of crowds to their booth, executives felt that the main theme and their brand of the company were not communicated well enough. The executives did not like their themes of pirate and treasure and also disliked the fact that Gary Busey offered to be a pitchman for the company when they visited the booth, which they felt was inappropriate.
  - Sent to boardroom: Mark McGrath & Gary Busey
  - Fired: Mark McGrath – for taking full responsibility for the pirate concept, which primarily caused the team to lose. Although the team unanimously felt that Gary should be fired, Mark could not defend himself enough to reverse his actions and save himself.

=== Episode 7: Raising the Steaks ===
Task 7

- Airdate: April 17, 2011
- Task scope: The celebrities must create a 20-minute live cooking demonstration for Omaha Steaks at The Institute of Culinary Education. They were additionally tasked with creating and naming an original Omaha Steaks variety pack.
- Task sponsor: Omaha Steaks
- Backbone project manager: Gary Busey
- A.S.A.P. project manager: Hope Dworaczyk
- Judges: Donald Trump; Ivanka Trump; Donald Trump Jr.
- Winning team: A.S.A.P
- Reasons for win: The executives felt the women's presentation was much more cohesive and that their "Poker Night" variety pack was well done.
- Losing Team: Backbone
  - Reason for loss: The executives much preferred the women's presentation, even though the men had a solid theme for the cooking demonstration and had actually cooked their meals live on stage (unlike the women.) The executives also felt that Gary's story regarding a family on Father's Day had been rambling and incomprehensible. They also felt that their "Variety Pack" lacked focus, and they didn't like having the audience members come up to actually eat the meals.
  - Sent to boardroom: No final boardroom – while Gary Busey had argued with the other men (particularly John Rich) several times during the task, he said that none of them deserved to come back to the boardroom and took full responsibility for the loss.
  - Fired: Gary Busey – for his very poor performance as a project manager and for his inability to function well with his teammates.
- Notes:
  - Hope Dworaczyk won $20,000 for her charity, and was told that the women's variety pack would be produced and sold by Omaha Steaks, with all profits from the pack going to the charity as well.
  - Barack Obama referenced this episode during his speech at the White House Correspondents Dinner in 2011, which Trump attended. It was clear that Obama did not make the reference in a complimentary manner.

=== Episode 8: Bitter Suites ===
Task 8

- Airdate: April 24, 2011
- Task scope: The teams must create a four-page pictorial and an advertising campaign for the Trump Hotel Collection.
- Task sponsor: Trump Hotel
- Backbone project manager: John Rich
- A.S.A.P. project manager: Star Jones
- Judges: Donald Trump; Eric Trump; Donald Trump Jr.
- Dramatic tension: The executives from the Trump Hotel Collection disliked both pictorials and their ad campaigns. They felt both teams did a mediocre job and didn't think there was a winner amongst both teams. It was up to Trump's decision as to which team had "lost", and who had a better presentation and sales pitch.
- Winning team: Backbone
  - Reasons for win: Despite the fact that they had a lousy ad with various typos and did not even include contact information or a phone number for Trump Hotel, the men's team had a better sales pitch and a smaller list of errors.
- Losing team: A.S.A.P.
  - Reason for loss: The executives felt that their presentation was too rehearsed. In addition, the women had an information folder that had multiple flaws with their graphics.
  - Sent to boardroom: Star Jones, La Toya Jackson, and NeNe Leakes
  - Fired: La Toya Jackson – though Trump did not feel she performed significantly better or worse on the task than the other team members, he took into account that the sense among the women was that La Toya was their overall weakest link and felt firing her would give A.S.A.P. a more fair chance to compete against Backbone.
- Notes:
  - John Rich won $20,000 for his charity.
  - Despite her victory as team leader the previous week, Trump strongly implied that he would have fired Hope Dworaczyk had she been brought back into the boardroom, and said that Star Jones should have brought Hope back instead of NeNe Leakes. This was one of several major errors that Trump thought Star made, but there was still a general feeling that she was the strongest member of A.S.A.P. (with the possible exception of Marlee Matlin), and Trump decided that he could not fire her based on her past record in the contest.

=== Episode 9: Shear Madness ===
Task 9

- Airdate: May 1, 2011
- Task scope: The teams must each produce a hair show promoting hair styling products produced by Farouk Systems, including CHI hair straighteners and BioSilk hair products, emphasizing the safety of the products and the fact that they are made in America.
- Task sponsor: Farouk Systems
- Backbone project manager: Lil Jon
- A.S.A.P. project manager: NeNe Leakes
- Judges: Donald Trump; Eric Trump; Ivanka Trump
- Dramatic tension: Prior to the task, NeNe Leakes had a massive argument with Star Jones in front of Trump and Farouk, because NeNe felt Star had pushed her into becoming the Project Manager. Star attempted to explain that she did this because NeNe was the only remaining contestant who had not won any money for their charity, but NeNe felt Star was trying to set her up for failure, claiming Star picks the project manager every single week. This continued into the boardroom, where NeNe repeatedly and viciously attacked Star's reputation and personality. NeNe also repeatedly insulted Hope Dworaczyk during her initial outburst, accusing her of contributing nothing to the team and being Star's "puppet."
- Winning team: Backbone
  - Reasons for win: Farouk loved the men's focus on the brand and their cosmopolitan theme. Although he felt that they didn't address the safety of the products well enough, Farouk enjoyed having Lil Jon as the MC.
- Losing team: A.S.A.P.
  - Reasons for loss: While the women did focus on the safety of the products and Farouk loved the representation of the products and having Marlee Matlin as their model, he felt that the women's team did not have much of a theme. Farouk also felt that NeNe was a weak emcee who did not address the brand well and he was not impressed with Hope Dworaczyk's modeling. Despite praise for their stylists, Farouk also believed that they were the ones running the show, and not the women of A.S.A.P.
  - Sent to boardroom: NeNe Leakes, Star Jones, and Hope Dworaczyk
  - Fired: Hope Dworaczyk – for being seen as a weaker competitor than NeNe Leakes and Star Jones, for playing the game low-key for too long, and for her self-confessed lack of focus on the task after the argument during the task briefing, along with not defending herself after NeNe repeatedly insulted her during the argument. Despite NeNe's unprofessional outburst at the very beginning of the task and her two failures as a project manager, Trump felt that NeNe and Star could join Marlee Matlin to be a dominant force to beat the opposing team.
- Notes:
  - Lil Jon won $40,000 for his charity. The prize for the winning project manager in this task was originally supposed to be just $20,000, but Farouk decided to add another $20,000 out of his own pocket.
  - This was the first time in the history of The Apprentice that a previously fired candidate had been reinstated into the competition; La Toya Jackson, who had been fired in the previous episode, was brought back to the show as a replacement for Jose Canseco.
  - John Rich called Niki Taylor to come back and help his team out.
  - This was the second time Lil Jon and NeNe Leakes faced off as project managers.
  - The ending of this episode was disrupted during its airing in some time zones in North America due to breaking news coverage of the death of Osama bin Laden.

=== Episode 10: Laugh On ===
- Airdate: May 8, 2011

Task 10

- Task scope: Produce and sell tickets to a Live Comedy Event.
- Corporate shuffle: Prior to the task announcement, Star Jones told Trump that she was no longer willing to work with NeNe Leakes due to the massive arguments they had in the two previous tasks. Trump therefore moved NeNe over to Backbone, and sent Meat Loaf to fill her place on A.S.A.P.
- Backbone project manager: La Toya Jackson
- A.S.A.P. project manager: Meat Loaf
- Judges: Donald Trump, Ivanka Trump, Jim Cramer
- Quit: NeNe Leakes - She failed to show up to Backbone's initial team meeting, and refused to answer repeated calls from Lil Jon. When Trump eventually got in contact with NeNe, she angrily accused him of bias toward Star Jones, and that he had "accommodated" Star by moving NeNe onto Backbone. Despite Trump trying to persuade her to stay, she contacted Backbone separately and confirmed that she would not return to the show.
- Winning team: A.S.A.P.
  - Reasons for win: Star Jones was able to secure a video cameo by Tracy Morgan, and all the team members were able to bring in large donations. A.S.A.P. raised $102,080.
- Losing team: Backbone
  - Reasons for loss: While Backbone were able to secure the services of Jimmy Fallon, and actually had him host the show rather than just making a cameo, only John Rich and Lil Jon brought in any donors. NeNe Leakes quit the show at the start of the task, and while La Toya Jackson organized their comedy event well, she wasn't able to secure any donations. Backbone raised $82,500
- Sent to the boardroom: No final boardroom; La Toya Jackson half-heartedly tried to persuade Trump not to fire anyone due to NeNe Leakes having quit the team at the start of the episode, but Trump refused the suggestion, pointing out that Backbone still had as many members as A.S.A.P. did after she quit. La Toya then took full responsibility for the loss, leading to Trump firing her.
- Fired: La Toya Jackson – for admitting that she had been the weakest member of Backbone and that John Rich and Lil Jon were not responsible for the loss. Despite this being the second time she was fired this season, Trump commended her for coming back and still giving the task her all, and La Toya was happier with the manner of her exit this time than she had been the first time she was fired.
- Notes:
  - When informed of NeNe Leakes' departure, La Toya Jackson sympathised with her decision to leave, though said it was something she wouldn't have done in NeNe's position. John Rich and Lil Jon were far more critical of NeNe, however, with John deriding her decision as "amateur hour", and Lil Jon pointing out that by quitting, she had effectively allowed Star Jones to win their conflict. In the boardroom, Trump retroactively fired NeNe, calling her a quitter.
  - Trump also claimed in the boardroom that all the people who have previously quit the show (which include Verna Felton, Michelle Sorro, Vincent Pastore, and Michael Johnson) have called him personally and told him it was the worst mistake of their lives, because everyone calls them a "loser" and a "quitter". Given that Michelle Sorro continues to use the phrase "Quit to Win" as part of her brand as recently as 2019, it is highly likely that Trump's claim is false.
  - This is the first season of The Apprentice to feature two people leaving the show on their own accord.
  - This is the only episode this season to feature a team change.

Task 11

- Task scope: Create a 60-second commercial for the new OnStar Mirror.
- Task sponsor: OnStar
- Backbone project manager: John Rich
- A.S.A.P. project manager: Marlee Matlin
- Judges: Donald Trump; George H. Ross; Donald Trump Jr.
- Winning team: Backbone
  - Reasons for win: Although the OnStar representatives had numerous problems with Backbone's commercial, including Lil Jon's over the top performance, along with the fact that a woman was depicted driving without a seatbelt, they felt that the advert clearly communicated the features of the product. Allowances were also made for the fact that Lil Jon effectively had to do the first half of the task single-handed, after John Rich fell ill with a sinus infection.
- Losing team: A.S.A.P.
  - Reasons for loss: Their advert, which starred and was written by Meat Loaf, failed to make clear what was being advertised and came across as a general advert for the company rather than one specifically made for the OnStar Mirror. It also contained what the OnStar executives considered an offensive stereotype of police officers.
- Sent to boardroom: Marlee Matlin, Star Jones, and Meat Loaf
  - Trump Thoughts: While Marlee Matlin was criticised somewhat by George for lacking leadership and allowing Meat Loaf to take over the entire task, Trump refused to seriously contemplate firing Marlee, due to her exceptionally strong track record in the prior tasks. Star Jones did not help her case when she insisted that Meat Loaf had made a sexist insult by calling her "sweetie" in the boardroom. Trump found it strange that Star seemed more upset by this than the repeated insults that NeNe Leakes had aimed at her over the last few weeks (especially considering Star's legal background), and Donald Jr. pointed out that he had heard Meat Loaf refer to John Rich and Lil Jon as "sweetie" in the previous tasks, but Star refused to back down on the matter. While Trump questioned whether Star was being opportunistic to get Meat Loaf fired, he decided he had grounds to fire her regardless, as both he and George felt that Star had failed in her role in charge of branding, which was seen as the main reason for the loss.
- Fired: Star Jones – for failing to put the information about the OnStar Mirror in the commercial and making a big deal about a comment Meat Loaf made.
- Notes:
  - This episode featured two tasks and three people exiting the show. Also, this was the first episode of the season to be three hours long.

=== Episode 11: Retro Rumble ===
Task 12

- Airdate: May 15, 2011
- Task scope: Individual interviews with the past winners of The Celebrity Apprentice, who will later advise Donald Trump on who should advance to the final two.
- Interviewers: Piers Morgan, Joan Rivers, Bret Michaels
- Fired:
  - Lil Jon - for demonstrating a lack of self-belief by admitting that he did not think he would make it to this final stage at the start of the process.
  - Meat Loaf – for his overly emotional nature & being unable to control his emotions which Trump and the interviewers did not see as being appropriate for the business world.
- Finalists: Marlee Matlin & John Rich

Task 13

- Task scope: The final two, with teams of three previously fired candidates to help, each finalist must produce a launch campaign for 7UP Retro, design a new can, produce a 30-second commercial, create an editorial, and present the entire campaign at a gala.
- John's Team: Lil Jon, Star Jones, Mark McGrath
- Marlee's Team: Meat Loaf, La Toya Jackson, Richard Hatch
- Notes:
  - This is a two-part episode. The first part are the interviews, where the final four celebrities will be whittled down to just two finalists. The second part will be aired live where the winner will be chosen on live television by Donald Trump.
  - 7UP thought that both contestants were considered winners so before the task started, 7UP gave both Marlee Matlin and John Rich $50,000 for each of their charities.
  - The final task was the third task featuring Marlee Matlin and John Rich as opposing project managers. Coincidentally John Rich was the opposing project manager in 2 of 3 non-finale tasks that Marlee Matlin stints as a project manager. Their records are 2-1 (John Rich) and 1-1 (Marlee Matlin) prior to the finale.

=== Episode 12: Sweet Victory (Season Finale) ===
- Airdate: May 22, 2011
- Prologue: This is a continuation of the previous episode, Retro Rumble, which is interspersed with commentary by Trump from the telecast of the live finale. The Celebrity Apprentice will be crowned live at the end of the episode. Also Don Jr. made the comment to John Rich about the Stetson hat that John gave to Trump.
- Tension: Marlee's team is frustrated because in addition to her lack of leadership, their celebrity Geoffrey Holder may not appear to film the commercial due to contractual issues. On the other hand, John Rich may have sabotaged himself because he announces the beginning of the Def Leppard concert before they are ready to appear.
- The Celebrity Apprentice: John Rich – For his very strong track record throughout the season, his quick thinking in salvaging the concert after the Def Leppard mishap, and for having made up what looked like an insurmountable gap to Marlee Matlin's total at the start of the task.
- Runner Up: Marlee Matlin – While Trump said that she would have easily won any previous season of the show, he deemed her to simply not have done as strong of a job as John Rich on this task. Marlee also didn't help her cause by failing to carry out any fundraising on the task, with Trump strongly implying that had she raised any appreciable amount of funds, she would have won.
- Notes:
  - John Rich decided to carry out additional fundraising at his event, and earned approximately $300,000 more for his charity, bringing his total before being awarded the final prize to $1,036,908, which put him just $13,092 behind Marlee Matlin. In contrast, Marlee focused solely on running her event and didn't raise any additional money. In the live finale Marlee attempted to argue that the extra money raised by John should be disallowed, since the two finalists were never told to raise money, but John countered by pointing out that fundraising had been a part of all three prior Celebrity Apprentice finales, and Trump added that he never told either of them not to raise funds.
  - Dionne Warwick and Jose Canseco were not present for the live reunion portion of the show, as Dionne was performing at a charity event in London, while Jose was busy with his duties as coach of the Yuma Scorpions. Richard Hatch was also not present, due to his incarceration at the time.
  - After announcing that he would "do something different", Trump simply announced John Rich as the winner of The Celebrity Apprentice 2011.
  - During the finale, Star Jones accused NeNe Leakes of threatening her and claimed that her behavior made "every African-American woman" look bad, while NeNe continued her attacks on Star's personality.

== U.S. ratings ==
Episode	Rating	Share	Rating/share (18–49)	Viewers (millions)	Rank (Timeslot)	Rank (Night)
1	4.9	8	2.8/7	7.93		
2	5.0	8	2.8/8	8.13		
3	5.1	8	2.8/8	8.17		
4	5.4	9	3.0/8	8.58		
5	5.2	8	3.1/8	8.65		
6	5.0	8	3.0/8	8.23		
7	4.7	7	2.6/7	7.66		
8	4.8	8	3.0/8	8.26		
9	5.1	8	3.1/8	8.65		
10	4.4	7	2.4/7	7.18		
11			2.5/6	6.8		
12			3.0/7	8.61		
