= ABC Super Soap Weekend =

ABC Super Soap Weekend (1996–2008) was an event organized in conjunction with Disney and ABC to bring soap opera actors from various ABC shows to visit and mingle with their fans.

The first ABC Super Soap Weekend was organized and held at Disney's Hollywood Studios near Orlando in 1996 (the same year Disney merged with ABC). The event was traditionally held around Veterans Day weekend each year. In addition, a summertime Super Soap Weekend was held at Disney California Adventure Park on the West Coast in 2002 and 2003.

The final edition of the event was held November 15–16, 2008. A new event titled "Soap Nation" began in January 2009 and featured many events across the country that allowed guests to meet their favorite actors and actresses. It proved not to be as successful as Super Soap Weekend and was discontinued briefly after, especially as ABC's daytime division experienced budget cuts and many of the network's programs ended.

== All My Children (Florida) ==
- Kelly Ripa (1996–2001)
- Mark Consuelos (1996–2001)
- John Callahan (1996–2002)
- Eva La Rue (1996, 2002–2004)
- Walt Willey (1996–2005)
- Michael E. Knight (1996–2001, 2003–2007)
- Susan Lucci (1996–2008)
- Michael Lowry (1997)
- Marcy Walker (1997–1999)
- David Canary (1997–1999, 2001 & 2007)
- Robin Mattson (1998)
- Michael Nader (1998)
- Cady McClain (1998 - 2000 & 2006)
- Cameron Mathison (1998 - 2001 & 2003 - 2008)
- Julia Barr (1999)
- Finola Hughes (1999 & 2001)
- Josh Duhamel (1999–2001)
- Vincent Irizarry (1999 - 2004 & 2008)
- Esta TerBlanche (2000)
- Eden Riegel (2000, 2001, 2003, 2004, 2006 & 2008)
- Rebecca Budig (2000 - 2004 & 2008)
- Jack Scalia (2001 & 2002)
- Samuel Page (2002)
- Alicia Minshew (2002–2008)
- Aiden Turner (2002–2008)
- Tomy Dunster (2003)
- Michael Jordan (2003)
- Jacob Young (2003–2007)
- James Scott (2004)
- Justin Bruening (2004–2006)
- Alexa Havins (2004–2006)
- Bobbie Eakes (2004, 2007 & 2008)
- Thorsten Kaye (2004–2008)
- Leven Rambin (2005)
- Tanisha Lynn (2005)
- Jeff Branson (2005)
- Sydney Penny (2005)
- Kelli Giddish (2005)
- Colin Egglesfield (2006)
- Melissa Claire Egan (2007 & 2008)
- Darnell Williams (2008)
- Ricky Paull Goldin (2008)

== All My Children (California) ==
- Susan Lucci (2002 & 2003)
- John Callahan (2002 & 2003)
- Walt Willey (2002 & 2003)
- Finola Hughes (2002 & 2003)
- Vincent Irizarry (2002 & 2003)
- Eden Riegel (2002 & 2003)
- Rebecca Budig (2002 & 2003)
- Alicia Minshew (2002 & 2003)
- Aiden Turner (2002 & 2003)
- Amelia Heinle (2002 & 2003)
- Jill Larson (2002 & 2003)
- Julia Barr (2002 & 2003)
- Elizabeth Hendrickson (2002 & 2003)
- Cameron Mathison (2002)
- David Canary (2002)
- Jack Scalia (2002)
- Michael E. Knight (2002)
- J. Eddie Peck (2002)
- Marcy Walker (2002)
- Terri Ivens (2002)
- Marj Dusay (2002)
- Tomy Dunster (2003)
- Michael Jordan (2003)
- Maximillian Alexander (2003)
- William DeVry (2003)
- Eva La Rue (2003)
- Marc Menard (2003)

== One Life to Live ==
- Christopher Douglas (1996)
- Nathan Fillion (1996)
- Robin Strasser (1996)
- Gina Tognoni (1996)
- Thorsten Kaye (1996)
- Erin Torpey (1996–2000)
- James DePaiva (1996–2002)
- Kassie DePaiva (1996–2008)
- Timothy D. Stickney (1997)
- Laura Koffman (1997)
- Kevin Stapleton (1997)
- Robert S. Woods (1997, 1999 & 2001)
- Hillary B. Smith (1997–2001, 2003–2004)
- David Fumero (1998–2002, 2005–2006)
- Catherine Hickland (1998–2002)
- Linda Dano (1999–2003)
- Jason-Shane Scott (2000)
- Erika Page (2000)
- Ty Treadway (2000–2002)
- Kamar de los Reyes (2000–2007)
- Laurence Lau (2001)
- Ilene Kristen (2002)
- Kristen Alderson (2002 & 2006 - 2008)
- Dan Gauthier (2003)
- Tuc Watkins (2003)
- Kathy Brier (2003–2007)
- Trevor St. John (2003–2007)
- Bree Williamson (2003–2008)
- Renée Elise Goldsberry (2004–2006)
- Michael Easton (2004–2008)
- Melissa Archer (2005)
- Heather Tom (2005)
- Erika Slezak (2005–2008)
- John-Paul Lavoisier (2005–2008)
- Melissa Gallo (2005 & 2006)
- Forbes March (2006 & 2007)
- Tika Sumpter (2007)
- Susan Haskell (2008)
- Brittany Underwood (2008)
- Jason Tam (2008)
- Farah Fath (2008)

== General Hospital (Florida) ==
- Lynn Herring (1996)
- John J. York (1996–1998)
- Ingo Rademacher (1996–1999, 2001 & 2003)
- Tyler Christopher (1996 & 1997, 2003 - 2005 & 2008)
- Vanessa Marcil (1996, 1997 & 2002)
- Steve Burton (1996, 1997, 2002 & 2005)
- Stephen Nichols (1997)
- Jacklyn Zeman (1996–2002)
- Wally Kurth (1996–2003)
- Brad Maule (1996–1998)
- Jonathan Jackson (1998)
- Nancy Lee Grahn (1998–2001 & 2003)
- Rebecca Herbst (1998-2002 & 2004 - 2008)
- Stuart Damon (1999)
- Billy Warlock (1999)
- Stephen Nichols (1999)
- Amber Tamblyn (1999)
- Michael Saucedo (1999)
- Sarah Brown (1996 & 2000)
- A Martinez (2000)
- Coltin Scott (2000–2002)
- John Ingle (2000–2002)
- Jacob Young (2000–2002)
- Chad Brannon (2000–2003)
- Maurice Benard (2001)
- Marisa Remirez (2001)
- Tamara Braun (2001 & 2002)
- Robin Christopher (2001 & 2002)
- Rick Hearst (2003)
- Alicia Leigh Willis (2003–2005)
- Natalia Livingston (2003–2005)
- Scott Clifton (2003–2006)
- Kelly Monaco (2003 & 2005 - 2008)
- Greg Vaughan (2003–2006 & 2008)
- Ted King (2004)
- Lesli Kay (2004)
- Adrianne Leon (2004)
- Kirsten Storms (2005 & 2008)
- Kimberly McCullough (2005–2008)
- Laura Wright (2005–2008)
- Tristan Rogers (2006)
- Genie Francis (2006)
- Anthony Geary (2006)
- Jason Thompson (2006–2008)
- Julie Marie Berman (2006–2008)
- Josh Duhon (2007)
- Sonya Eddy (2007)
- Bradford Anderson (2007 & 2008)
- Brandon Barash (2008)
- Jason Cook (2008)

== General Hospital (California) ==
- Tyler Christopher (2002 & 2003)
- Nancy Lee Grahn (2002 & 2003)
- Rebecca Herbst (2002 & 2003)
- Chad Brannon (2002 & 2003)
- Tamara Braun (2002 & 2003)
- Steve Burton (2003)
- Stuart Damon (2003)
- Billy Warlock (2003)
- Lane Davies (2003)
- John Ingle (2003)
- Cynthia Preston (2003)
- Kin Shiner (2003)
- Rick Hearst (2003)
- Alicia Leigh Willis (2003)
- Natalia Livingston (2003)
- Greg Vaughan (2003)
- Leslie Charleson (2003)
- Robin Christopher (2003)

== General Hospital: Night Shift ==
- Nazanin Boniadi (2007)
- Dominic Rains (2007)
- Kent Masters King (2007)
