= Steven David Catlin =

American serial killer on death row (born 1944)

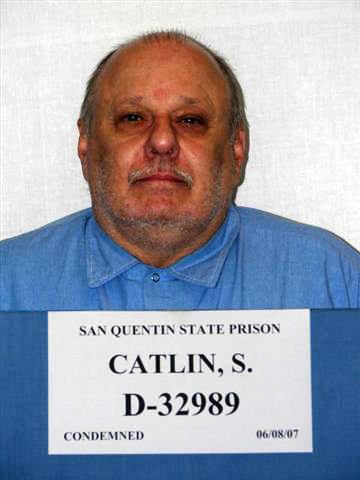
- Catlin at San Quentin State Prison in 2007
- Born: 1944 (age 81–82); Kern County, California, United States
- Spouses: Joyce Catlin; Glenna Kaye
- Convictions: First degree murder with special circumstances (2 counts); First degree murder
- Penalty: Death

Details
- Victims: 3–4
- Span of crimes: 1976–1984
- Country: United States
- States: California; Nevada
- Imprisoned at: California State Prison, Corcoran

Steven David Catlin (born 1944) is a convicted American serial killer who murdered two wives and his adoptive mother in California and Nevada from 1976 until 1984. Sentenced to death in 1990, he is currently housed in California State Prison, Corcoran.

== Early life ==
In 1944, Catlin was adopted as an infant by Glenn and Martha Catlin of Kern County, California, and was living in Bakersfield with his parents in the early 1950s. Dropping out of high school, he showed no interest in honest work. He was arrested on forgery charges at age 19, serving nine months in a California Youth Authority camp.

Catlin's first marriage was stormy and violent, and his abuse of drugs exacerbated domestic problems. In 1966, he married a second wife without divorcing the first, employing a pseudonym on the marriage license.

A few months after the second marriage, he was arrested for stealing a credit card at the gas station where he worked. The judge called Catlin an addict and sentenced him to serve time in the state prison at Chino, where he spent the next three years.

When he was released, Catlin divorced his first wife and remarried his second, using his real name, but the relationship was already doomed. The couple separated after ten months, and Catlin was married a third time, divorcing eight months later. A fourth wife, Joyce, was acquired in short order, but she would prove less fortunate than her predecessor in escaping from a dead-end marriage.

Catlin's fascination with cars led to a job with the pit crew of racer Glendon Emery, based in Fresno, California. Infatuated with Emery's stepdaughter, Catlin began to court her while still married to Joyce.

== Murders ==
In April 1976, Joyce Catlin was admitted to Bakersfield's Mercy Hospital with a severe "flu"; she seemed to improve, then took a sudden turn for the worse and died of "pneumonia" in May 1976. Also, in the same month, Catlin married his fifth wife, Glenna Kaye, and moved to Fresno, finding employment at a local garage. Quick promotions placed him in charge of 40 employees, but Catlin had expensive tastes, and cash was always short. On October 28, 1980, his adoptive father died suddenly, and the fluid in his lungs was attributed to cancer. Once again, the body was swiftly cremated on orders from Catlin.

In 1981, Catlin's employers at the Fresno garage noticed missing auto parts. A subsequent background check turned up his criminal record, and he was forced to resign, though no charges were filed. Financially, the strain began to mount. On February 17, 1984, Glenna Kaye Catlin suddenly fell ill while visiting Las Vegas with her mother. Returning to Fresno, she was hospitalized with fluid in her lungs. Physicians were still trying to diagnose her illness when she died on March 14.

Catlin, meanwhile, had received $57,000 from life insurance payments and acquired another fiancée, encountered on a visit to the hospital. Back in Bakersfield, his third ex-wife had followed the series of deaths in Catlin's life, and she approached the local sheriff with suspicions. Joyce Catlin had been cremated, but the hospital retained some of her tissue samples, which were submitted for analysis in November 1984.

A few days later, on December 8, Catlin's mother, Martha, collapsed and died from a "stroke," shortly after a visit by Steven and his fiancée. Catlin had ordered that his mother's body be cremated, but the process was postponed until an autopsy could be performed.

== Arrest and convictions ==
Analysis of tissue samples from his mother and his two late wives revealed that all had suffered poisoning from paraquat, a highly toxic herbicide. A bottle of paraquat, complete with Catlin's fingerprints, was found in his garage.

On December 23, 1985, Catlin was charged in Kern County with the 1976 murder of Joyce Catlin, his fourth wife, and the 1984 murder of Martha Catlin, his mother.

Shortly after marrying his sixth and final wife, Catlin was indicted for the murder of his fifth wife, Glenna Kaye Catlin. Catlin's trial for this murder was held in Monterey County (owing to pretrial publicity) before the Kern County trial. In April 1986, Catlin was convicted of Glenna Kaye's murder, and the jury fixed a penalty of life imprisonment without the possibility of parole.

On June 1, 1990, a Kern County jury returned a guilty verdict on the murder counts of Joyce and Martha Catlin. The jury agreed with the prosecution's allegations of special circumstances (murder for financial gain, murder by poison, and multiple murders). On June 6, 1990, the jury fixed Catlin's penalty as death. The fact that Catlin had already been convicted for Glenna Kaye's murder was not introduced until after the verdict.

== See also ==
- List of serial killers in the United States
- Poisoned by Love: The Kern County Murders
