= Creative Juice =

American television series

Creative Juice is a crafting television show hosted by Cathie Filian and Steve Piacenza on HGTV and DIY Network. The program features art projects, home decorating ideas, and cooking. Filian and Piacenza were nominated for a Daytime Emmy in the Best Lifestyle Host category in 2006. The program spawned a Halloween-themed spinoff called Witch Crafts in 2007.

== Season 1 ==
Episode #	Episode	Original airdate	Season	Featured Crafts
DCRJ-101L	Aloha	February 6, 2006	1	Easter Island Tiki Masks, Beaded Bamboo Curtains, Pineapple Spirits & Hawaiian Print Luminaries
DCRJ-102L	Treasure Junking	February 13, 2006	1	Revamped Chair, Vintage Tea Tray & Revamped Lamp
DCRJ-103L	Bloom	February 20, 2006	1	Spaghetti Herb Garden, Rustic Pots, Preppy Painted Pots, Rock 'n' Roll Pots, & Topiary Birthday Cake
DCRJ-104L	Speed Racer	February 27, 2006	1	License-Plate Scrapbooks, Lucky Flower Key Rings, Dice Tire Valve Caps & Hubcap Folk-Art Candelabra
DCRJ-105L	The Under-$5 Gift	March 6, 2006	1	Coffee Liqueur, Flower Candleholders, Decorated Mirrors & Covered Chinese Takeout
DCRJ-106L	Aromatherapy	March 13, 2006	1	Lavender Eye Pillow, Lavender and Rosemary Heating Pad, Fizzing Rose Petals, Herbal Tea Soaps & Lavender Dryer Pillows
DCRJ-107L	Dogs Rock	March 20, 2006	1	Animal Tags, Dog Biscuits, Fleece Pet Beds & Fancy Leashes
DCRJ-108L	New Looks for Books	March 27, 2006	1	Book Candelabra, Book-Lover's Napkin Rings, Altered Books Tape Transfers & Sewn Bookmarks
DCRJ-109L	Swank Attire Please	April 3, 2006	1	Paper-Punched Invitations, Monogrammed Napkins, Beaded Hors d'Oeuvres Picks, Fabric-Covered Tube Vases, Ice Bowl, & Chocolate Martinis With Fancy-Rimmed Glasses
DCRJ-110L	Fantasy Crafts	April 10, 2006	1	Coffee Filter Flowers, Fairy Wings, Fairy Flower Dolls & Treasure Chest
DCRJ-111L	Sparkle	April 17, 2006	1	Sparkling Hair Flowers, Disco Balls, Metallic Leather Bird Pin & Twinkle Tiaras
DCRJ-112L	Wall Flower	April 24, 2006	1	Lime Wash, Projector Art, Polka-Dot Walls & Roman Clay
DCRJ-113L	Get Glowing	May 1, 2006	1	Etched Barware, Soy Container Candles & Secret Glowing Love Messages

== Season 2 ==
Episode #	Episode	Original airdate	Season	Featured Crafts
DCRJ-201L (14)	Bridal Shower	Unknown	2	Daisy Invitations, Daisy Placemats, Daisy Chicken-Salad Sandwiches, Daisy Pens and Party-Favor Stationery, & Pocket-Fold Napkin
DCRJ-202L (15)	Record Mania	Unknown	2	Bleached Rocker T-shirts, Record-Album Room Divider, Folded-Paper CD Covers, & Record-Album Scrapbook
DCRJ-203L (16)	Apples & Pears	Unknown	2	Gilded Apples and Pears, Apple-Stamped Stationery, Infused Vodka & Auntie's Apple Crisp
DCRJ-204L (17)	Recess	Unknown	2	Art Smocks, Monster Cube Chairs, Crazy Crayons & Art-Supply Roll-Up
DCRJ-205L (18)	Film Noir	Unknown	2	Homemade Root Beer, Filmstrip Lampshade, Painted Popcorn Bowls & Funky Director's Chair
DCRJ-206L (19)	Go Team	Unknown	2	Artificial-Turf Coffee Table, Pompons, Stadium Cushions, Caramel Popcorn and Peanuts With Prizes & Bratwurst Dogs With Grilled Onions
DCRJ-207L (20)	Wardrobe Revival	Unknown	2	T-shirt Quilt, Tie-Dyed Slip Dress, Jeweled Home Frames, Jeweled Home Pillows & Denim Wine Bags
DCRJ-208L (21)	Backyard Fun	Unknown	2	Bubbles and Bubble Wands, Towel Tote Bag, Painted Patio Furniture & Lavender Lemonade
DCRJ-209L (22)	Being Picasso	Unknown	2	Children's Art Books, Crayon-Transferred T-shirts, Pulp Book Panels, Marbleized Paper & Paper Punched-Art Cherry Blossoms
DCRJ-210L (23)	Travel Time	Unknown	2	Cigar-Box Travel Checkerboard, Cigar-Box Travel Backgammon, Passport Covers, & Travel Shadow Boxes
DCRJ-211L (24)	Bottles Up	Unknown	2	Bottle-Cap Jewelry, Recycled-Bottle Vases, Snow Globes, & Juice-Box Placemats
DCRJ-212L (25)	Are You Game?	Unknown	2	Vegas Game Clock, Game-Piece Necklaces, & Poker Tablecloth
DCRJ-213L (26)	Giddy Up	Unknown	2	Western Shirts, Rustic Floral Arrangement, Soup-Can Luminaries, Peach Tea Sangria, Bandanna Napkin Fold, Cowboy Utensil Holder, Cowboy Party Favors, Cowboy's Tablecloth, & Grilled Banana Splits

== Season 3 ==
Episode #	Episode	Original airdate	Season	Featured Crafts
DCRJ-301L (27)	Rockabilly	December 4, 2006	3	Bubble Jet Set Image Transferring and Rocking T-shirt, Rockabilly Handbag, Men's Cuff Bracelets, & Personalized Patches
DCRJ-302L (28)	Global Shipping	December 5, 2006	3	Shipping-Tag Scrapbook, Vintage Stamp Shipping Caddy, Sealing Wax Candles, & Wax Glue Sticks
DCRJ-303L (29)	Beads by Hand	December 6, 2006	3	Clay Bead Making and Bracelet, Paper Beads, Paper Bead Necklace, Beaded Beads Necklace, & Fabric-Covered Beads
DCRJ-304L (30)	Say Cheese	December 7, 2006	3	Funky Frames, Photo-Tinting and Metallic-Wax Polish, Metallic-Wax Polishing, Indulgent Chocolate-Mint Cheesecake, & Silhouetted Wall Hangings
DCRJ-305L (31)	Wine Country	December 8, 2006	3	Wine-Label Scrapbook, Wine-Bottle Soap Dispenser, Etched Wine Glasses, & Custom Cork Stoppers
DCRJ-306L (32)	Mixed Up Paper	December 11, 2006	3	Paper Mosaic Tray, Natural Paper Jewelry Box, Natural Paper-Wrapped Candles, Vintage Label Tiles, & Paper Confetti Egg Poppers
DCRJ-307L (33)	Wardrobe Redo	December 12, 2006	3	Jeans Pocket Organizer, Corduroy Pants Purse, Critter Hat Puppets, T-shirt Scarf
DCRJ-308L (34)	Cabin Fever	December 13, 2006	3	Leather Log Carrier, Decorative Matches, Bean-Ball Candleholder, Hot-Tea Toddies, Shortbread and Rum-Frosting Sandwiches, & Homemade Fire Logs
DCRJ-309L (35)	Babies	December 14, 2006	3	Chick" Painted Baby T-shirt, "Kurta" Painted Baby T-shirt, Fleece Booties, Bathtime Puppet, & Smoothie Pops
DCRJ-310L (36)	Alphabits	December 15, 2006	3	Front Door Plaques, Personalized Coat Hangers, Alphabet Soup, Cookie Cutter Alphabits Toasts, & Embroidered Silver-Cloth Bags
DCRJ-311L (37)	Mod Modern	December 18, 2006	3	Plexiglas™ Mobile à la Calder, Citrine Necklace and Earrings, Color-Blocked Artwork à la Warhol, & Beatnik Blaster With Melon Garnish
DCRJ-312L (38)	Buttoned Up!	December 19, 2006	3	Layered Button Rings and Pins, Floral Bundle Cards, Framed Buttons, & Fruity Table Linens
DCRJ-313L (39)	New Looks for Old Containers	December 20, 2006	3	Tic-Tac-Toe Game, Ice-Sculpture Centerpiece, Lipgloss Cases, & Crafty Solutions

== Season 4 ==
Episode #	Episode	Original airdate	Season	Featured Crafts
DCRJ-401L (40)	Family History	December 21, 2006	4	Organic Twig-and-Wire Family Tree, Heirloom Locket and Pearl Bracelet, Family Recipe Box, & Paper Family-Tree Recipe Cards
DCRJ-402L (41)	Bohemian	December 21, 2006	4	Patchwork Tack Board and Pins, Bohemian Beaded Lamp, Cluster Ring, & Red Wine Spritzers
DCRJ-403L (42)	Faux Fun	December 22, 2006	4	Monogrammed Looking-Glass Mirror, Paper Couture Butterfly Necklaces, Faux Leather Lampshade, & Faux Fur Stole
DCRJ-404L (43)	Homemade Hardware	December 27, 2006	4	Pipe-Part Candlesticks: Patina Finish, Pipe-Part Candlesticks: Painted Finish, Washer Jewelry, '70s Storage Locker, & Tool Pegboard
DCRJ-405L (44)	Pink Paris	December 28, 2006	4	Velvet Stamped Shawl, Chunky Gemstone Ring, Kir Royale, Sugared Grapes, & Eiffel Tower Appliquéd Pillow
DCRJ-406L (45)	Under $10	December 29, 2006	4	Batik Silk Scarf, Monogram Doormat, & Silk-and-Ribbon Photo Album
DCRJ-407L (46)	It's a Doll's World	January 2, 2007	4	Painted Tea Table and Chairs, Felt Pizza, Miniature Sponge Cake, Miniature Pies, Felt Fortune Cookies, Mini Cupcakes, Doll's Bed and Quilt, Mod Fashion Doll Sofa
DCRJ-408L (47)	Rings and Things	January 3, 2007	4	Hippie Disk Belt, Ring-Stamped Tote Bag, Banana Bundt Cake, & Disk Keyring
DCRJ-409L (48)	70s Groove	January 4, 2007	4	Cork and Magnetic Board, Tie-Dyed, Stamped Pillowcases, Funky Leather Belts and Velvet-Wrapped Bracelets, Velvet-Covered Bracelet, & Lava-Lamp and Disco-Ball Greeting Cards
DCRJ-410L (49)	Art Around the World	January 5, 2007	4	Stretched Fabrics, Relief Map Painting, Modern Grass Painting, & Recycled Art
DCRJ-411L (50)	Bridal Bunch	January 8, 2007	4	Monogrammed Wood-Burned Chargers, Découpaged Glass Brunch Plates, Pesto, Toasted Garlic Bread, Drizzled Tomato Slices, Bloody Mary, Egg Strata, Fruit Kebabs, Floral Centerpieces, & Birds' Nest Party Favors
DCRJ-412L (51)	Felt	January 9, 2007	4	Felt Ball Necklace and Toys, Kids' Felt Travel Book, Felt Flower Pins and Stems, & Felt Needle Case
DCRJ-413L (52)	Wrap It Up	January 10, 2007	4	Wrapped Box, Mini Gift Box, Mini Gift Pillow, Punched Wrapping Paper, Waxed-Paper Envelope, Blooming Branch, Beaded Letter, Decorator Bow, & Recycled Gift Bags

== Season 5 ==
Episode #	Episode	Original airdate	Season	Featured Crafts
DCRJ-501L (53)	Lost and Found	February 5, 2007	5	Antique Window With Faux Stained Glass, Vintage Eyeglass Frames and Funky Pins, Message Center, & Framed Found Objects
DCRJ-502L (54)	Citrus in the City	February 6, 2007	5	Pompon Scarf, Citrus Twist, Greyhound, Kids' Citrus Smoothie, Fabulous Orange Carnelian Earrings, Orange Candle, Pomander Centerpiece
DCRJ-503L (55)	Beautiful India	February 7, 2007	5	Hammered-Silver Jewelry Box, Henna-Stenciled Napkin Rings and Napkins, Indian Paper Poms With Potpourri and Spice, Chai and Indian Sweets
DCRJ-504L (56)	Pamper Yourself Gift Basket	February 8, 2007	5	Homemade Lip Balms, Simple Soaps With Not-So-Simple Packaging, Sugar Scrub, Salt Scrub, Basket Building Techniques
DCRJ-505L (57)	Paper Recycling	February 9, 2007	5	Handmade Paper Embedded with Flowers, Magazine Bowls, Eyeleted Greeting- and Note-Card Projects, Funky Folded Envelopes
DCRJ-506L (58)	Teen Time	February 12, 2007	5	Gumball Slippers, Crochet Charm Necklaces, Liquid Beadz Storage Hatboxes, Tattoo T-shirts, Graffiti Clothes Hook
DCRJ-507L (59)	When in Rome	February 13, 2007	5	Infused Olive Oil, Painted Glass Olive Oil Bottles, Italian Puppets, Rosemary Focaccia, Homemade Limoncello
DCRJ-508L (60)	Crafters' Caddies	February 14, 2007	5	Vintage Craft Book Magazine Rack, Paper Pattern Storage Boxes, Easy-Peasy Pincushion, Shrunken Flower Pins, Quilters' and Scrapbookers' Clipboard
DCRJ-509L (61)	Assemblage Art	February 15, 2007	5	Hex-Nut Drink Coasters, Velvet Hammer Cocktail, Romance Novel Puzzle Love Note, Hollowed-Out Book Puzzle Holder, Racetrack Art Piece, Surgically Altered Stuffed Animals
DCRJ-510L (62)	Appetizer Accessories	February 16, 2007	5	Appetizer Serving Platter, Slow-Cooker Crab Dip in a Sourdough Bowl, Herbed and Toasted Mixed Nuts, Olive Tapenade Cups With Crème Fraîche, Flower-Glazed Brie, Radish Roses, Carrot and Beet Shapes, Cucumber Cups, Setting the Table, Frayed-Edge Cocktail Napkins
DCRJ-511L (63)	Dresser Me Up	February 19, 2007	5	French Poster Art Dresser, Mod Parsons Table, "Cool Cube" Dorm Refrigerator, Dresser Maintenance: Paper and Wax
DCRJ-512L (64)	Coffee Cafe	February 20, 2007	5	Painted and Antiqued Tin Coffee Sign, Cappuccinos 101, Lattes 101, Easy Biscotti, Vintage Travel Souvenir Spoons Dipped in Chocolate
DCRJ-513L (65)	Paint the Town Prom	February 21, 2007	5	Boutonniere-Making 101, Layered Bead and Freshwater-Pearl Necklace, Embellishing Tricks for Garments, Custom-Made Cufflinks

== Season 6 ==
Episode #	Episode	Original airdate	Season	Featured Crafts
DCRJ-601L (66)	Plastic Fantastic	April 2, 2007	6	Oilcloth Table Runner, Napkin Rings and Silverware Caddy, Shrink-Plastic Link Bracelet and Backpack Charms, Vinyl Fabric Flower Hairpins, Painted Plastic Storage Tubs
DCRJ-602L (67)	Rock Out	April 6, 2007	6	Pebble Paintings, Garden Steppingstones, Lucky Bamboo, Rock Paperweights and Tacks, Firefly Cocktail and Lemon Daisy Mocktail
DCRJ-603L (68)	Vegas Baby	April 9, 2007	6	Vegas Dice Bracelet, Playing Card Purse, Poker Party Snack Plates and Other Vegas Table Accessories, Jumbo Card Note Pad
DCRJ-604L (69)	Monkey Business	April 13, 2007	6	Stuffed Sock Monkeys, Business Card Cases, Banana Cream Pie, Funky Monkey Art, Kitchen Items Monkey, Fabric Monkey
DCRJ-605L (70)	Favorite Bridal Favors	April 16, 2007	6	Charmed Thank-You Cards, Party Favors, Tasty Treats, Mini Shell Candles, Porcelain Ornaments, Message in a Bottle
DCRJ-606L (71)	Kids Birthday Party	April 20, 2007	6	Fabric "Happy Birthday" Banner, Custom Party Hats and Noisemakers, Peanut Butter and Chocolate Chip Ice Cream Cake
DCRJ-607L (72)	Flower Power	April 23, 2007	6	Pressed Flower Window Suncatchers, Drying Flowers, Framed Sun Prints with Photo Paper, Flower Salad and Vinaigrette, Flower Drying Techniques
DCRJ-608L (73)	Cha Cha Cha	April 27, 2007	6	Chalk and Resist Wall Hangings, Paper Lanterns, Puff-Pastry Meat Rolls, Fancy Recycled Jar Coasters
DCRJ-609L (74)	Blue Ribbon	April 30, 2007	6	Ribbon Photo Mat, Ribbon Bookmark, Ribbon Sachets, Funky Ribbon Pillows, Ribbon Hair Accessories, Velvet Flower Barrettes, Rhinestone Ribbon Headband, Bow Tying 101
DCRJ-610L (75)	State Fair	May 4, 2007	6	"Firecracker" Bean Bag Toss, Ticket Bowls, Quilted Cards, Cherry Cheesecake Pie, "You're a Winner" Ribbons
DCRJ-611L (76)	Kids Explore	May 7, 2007	6	Backyard or Livingroom Tipi, "Seek and Find" Backyard Bugs, "Seek and Find" Binoculars, S'Mores on a Stick, Grizzly Bear Granola, Personalized Flashlights and Hand Shadow Chart
DCRJ-612L (77)	Country Kitchen	May 11, 2007	6	Funky Printed and Personalized Dishtowels, Vintage-Style Apron; Dill Sweet Pickles, Cucumber Sandwiches
DCRJ-613L (78)	Potted Surprises	May 14, 2007	6	Clay Pot Birdbath, Painted Pots and Blooming Napkins, Flowerpot Dirt Dessert, Clay Pot Garden Bell

== Season 7 ==
Episode #	Episode	Original airdate	Season	Featured Crafts
DCRJ-701L (79)	Fiesta	January 8, 2008	7	Milk Jug Piñata, Rag Rug Party Pillows, Chicken Mole, Mango Margaritas
DCRJ-702L (80)	Rock Star	January 10, 2008	7	Resin Jewelry, Rocker Belt Buckles, Cutaway T-shirts, Cutaway Pillows
DCRJ-703L (81)	Farmers Market	January 15, 2008	7	Picket Fence Planter Box With Mint, Organic Garden Markers, Painted Garden Gloves and Bag, Raspberry and Orange Smoothies
DCRJ-704L (82)	Antiqued	January 17, 2008	7	Textured and Sculptured Mirror, Victorian Deconstructed Ruffle Top
DCRJ-705L (83)	Crafty Space	February 11, 2008	7	Trip to the Moon Scrapbook Page, Pulp Book Cover Laptop Case, Area 51 Cupcakes, Rocket
DCRJ-706L (84)	Water, Wind & Fire	February 12, 2008	7	Indoor Garden Fountain, Backyard Votive Fire Pit, Shell Chimes, Painted Watering Cans
DCRJ-707L (85)	Nail It Up	February 13, 2008	7	Punched Soda Can Lanterns, Rhinestone Tote, Nail-Studded Jeans, Studded Hoodie, String Art, Sour Beer Punch
DCRJ-708L (86)	Stamp Style	February 14, 2008	7	Wine, Bleach and Dye Stamping, Stamped and Rolled Beeswax Candles, Stamped Mailbox, Cleaning Rubber Stamps
DCRJ-709L (87)	Nature's Gifts	February 15, 2008	7	Gardener Lotion Bar, Edible Gold-Leaf Pears and Chocolates, Paper Gift Bags and Clay Tags, Silk Flower Gift Tags
DCRJ-710L (88)	Bathtime Jungle	February 17, 2008	7	Kids' Painted Shower Curtain, Kid's Leopard Towel Wrap, Tissue Box Cover, Ribbon-Embellished Towels, Nightlight Redo
DCRJ-711L (89)	Derby Days	February, 2008	7	Derby Shadow Box, Embellished "Fancy Hats", Kentucky Derby Mint Juleps, Derby-Watching Party Invitations
DCRJ-712L (90)	Table Full of Flowers	February, 2008	7	Hydrangea and Roses Urn Arrangement, Silk Hydrangea Urn Arrangement, Artificial Succulent Resin Arrangement, Tall Vase Arrangements, Rejuvenating Roses and Clear Tape Arrangement
DCRJ-713L (91)	Charming Babies	February, 2008	7	New Mom Necklaces, Buddha-ful Onesie, Baby Play Mat, Baby Sling, BabyPrint Scrapbook and Baby Accessory Sewing Patterns

== Season 8 ==
Episode #	Episode	Original airdate	Season	Featured Crafts
DCRJ-801L (92)	Mini Gifts	2008	8	Flower 'Mocktails', Earrings on Vintage Card, Mini Zucchini Bread, Mini Notes
DCRJ-802L (93)	Midsummer Night's Dinner	2008	8	Glittery, Gauzy Table Canopy, Buttonhole Floor Pillows and Woodsy Placemats, Pistachio-Crusted Salmon and Cucumber Soup, Rose Water Cocktail
DCRJ-803L (94)	Window Dressing	2008	8	Simple Kitchen Curtains, Custom Fabric Roller Shade, Paper Café Curtains, Mini Window Vases
DCRJ-804L (95)	From the Sea	2008	8	Plaster Mermaid Wall Ornament, Ribbon Mermaid Doll, Magnetic Pearl Bracelet and Beach Glass Pendant, Sea-Style Bath Salts
DCRJ-805L (96)	Medieval Lights	2008	8	Stamped and Studded Candles, Stained Glass Candles, Gothic Candelabra, Ribbon Votive Cups
DCRJ-806L (97)	Star Bright	2008	8	Mod Starburst Mirror, Star Fruit, Wire Mesh Star Lights, "You're My Star" Card
DCRJ-807L (98)	Asian Inspiration	2008	8	Beaded Hatpins, Hair Sticks and Bookmarks, Elegant Origami Stationery, Infused Sake and Custom Sake Set, Polymer Clay Sushi Magnets
DCRJ-808L (99)	Sunny Daze	2008	8	Floral Beaded Salad Set, Pounded Pansy Napkins, Wine Chiller and Wine Stopper, Homemade Peach Ice Cream, Bread Basket Liners
DCRJ-809L (100)	Keeping Time	2008	8	Scrapbook Clock, Record Clock, Turquoise Pendant Watch, Thyme Cheese Balls and Crackers, Oversized Wall Clock
DCRJ-810L (101)	Bon Voyage	2008	8	Eye-Catching Luggage Tags, Custom Travel Toiletry Hanger, Bon Voyage Cookie Bouquet, Travel Document Holder and Bleach-Art Tote
DCRJ-811L (102)	Beach Bums	2008	8	Stick-in-the-Sand Table, Secret Stash Beach Roll-Up, Bagel Chips and Hummus, Can Cozie Decorations
DCRJ-812L (103)	Kitties and Birdies	2008	8	Royal Cat Bed, Homemade Cat Toys, Recycled Bird Feeder, Kid-Friendly Bird Feeders
DCRJ-813L (104)	Sweet Tooth	2008	8	Sweet Tooth Fairy Pillow, Fruit Pizza, Double-Chocolate Brownie Bowls, Fun Toothbrush Holders

== Witch Crafts ==
Episode #	Episode	Original airdate	Season	Featured Crafts
DWCR-101	Halloween Home Décor	October 1, 2007	1	Glitzy Candles, EEK & BOO Candle, Spider Lanterns, Specimen Jars, Ghoulish Gourds, Creepy Tombstones, Halloween Tree, Halloween Ornaments
DWCR-102	Costumes	October 2, 2007	1	Punk Mummy, Glam Witch, Fairy Costume, Pirate Costumes, Spooky Bat Necklace, Halloween Pet T-shirts, Decorated Dog Leashes
DWCR-103	Tricks & Treats	October 3, 2007	1	
DWCR-104	Fall Harvest	October 4, 2007	1	
DWCR-105	Halloween Party	October 5, 2007	1	
