= Harry Loves Lisa =

- Genre: Reality
- Starring: Harry Hamlin; Lisa Rinna
- Country of origin: United States
- Original language: English
- No. of seasons: 1
- No. of episodes: 6

Production
- Executive producer: Jason Carbone
- Running time: 22 minutes
- Production company: Good Clean Fun

Original release
- Network: TV Land
- Release: October 6 – November 10, 2010

Harry Loves Lisa is an American reality television series on TV Land starring married couple Harry Hamlin and Lisa Rinna. The series follows the couple and their two preteen daughters as they live a hectic Hollywood lifestyle.

The series premiered on TV Land on October 6, 2010, at 10pm and ran for six episodes. The series was produced by Good Clean Fun.

== Episodes ==
No.	Title	Original release date
1	"Comedy Club"	October 6, 2010
2	"Camping"	October 13, 2010
3	"Belle Gray Party"	October 20, 2010
4	"Anniversary"	October 27, 2010
5	"Harry's Audition"	November 3, 2010
6	"Finale"	November 10, 2010

== Ratings ==
At the time of its airing, the premiere was the highest rated TVLand reality premiere since 2007.
