= Ty Treadway =

American game show host, actor, and talk show host

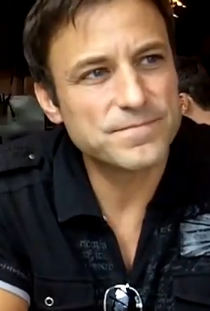
- Treadway in 2010
- Born: Tyrus Richard Treadway; February 11, 1967 (age 59); Trenton, New Jersey, U.S.
- Occupations: Actor; game show host; talk show host
- Years active: 1998–present
- Spouse: Monica Surratt (m. 2003)
- Children: 2

Tyrus Richard Treadway (born February 11, 1967) is an American game show host, actor, and talk show host, best known for hosting the game show Merv Griffin's Crosswords until the show’s end on May 16, 2008. Treadway also co-hosted Soap Talk with Lisa Rinna.

== Biography ==
Ty was born and raised in Trenton, New Jersey, to Richard and Mary Lou Treadway. Ty was the youngest of six siblings.

After high school, Ty received a scholarship for soccer and attended a couple of colleges before graduating with a degree in accounting. He went to work for the New Jersey Office of the State Auditor as an auditor and computer systems engineer but took part in bodybuilding competitions on the side. He eventually won the title of Mr. Natural Pennsylvania. He often had a "Ty Training" segment on his later talk show, Soap Talk.

However, Ty found his job boring and depressing so he decided to start modeling and acting. He appeared in several magazines, theater productions, and commercials.

In May 2000, Ty landed the role of Dr. Colin MacIver on the ABC soap opera One Life to Live. His character was killed off after a year, but he returned as his nicer twin brother, Troy MacIver, (who eventually went insane) and appeared off and on from 2001 to 2004.

In June 2002, Ty pulled double duty as soap star and talk show host. He began co-hosting Soapnet's Soap Talk with Lisa Rinna.

That year, he and his girlfriend Monica got engaged at the Eiffel Tower. They married in 2003, and their first child, a daughter named Samantha Raine, was born in February 2005. Their second child, a son named Ryder, was born March 7, 2006.

In March 2006, the series American Idol Extra debuted, featuring Treadway as host. Treadway interviewed various American Idol personalities, including producers, contestants, vocal coaches, and celebrity guests.

On April 30, 2007, Ty was chosen to host the game show Merv Griffin's Crosswords, created by Merv Griffin.

In 2009, he and his family moved to Frisco, Texas.

In 2010, he was offered a recurring role as Dr. Ben Walters on Days of Our Lives that lasted from September to February 2011.

In 2012, he resumed his role as Troy MacIver for the final episodes of One Life to Live. He also had a short-lived stint as a co-host on "Good Morning Texas," which airs throughout the Dallas–Fort Worth metroplex on WFAA. Recently he has been a real estate agent.

== Soap Talk ==
In 2002, the American cable network SOAPnet launch a soap opera talk show called Soap Talk and Treadway became a co-host along with Lisa Rinna. He and Rinna received a Daytime Emmy nomination for outstanding talk show host alongside such shows as Live with Regis and Kelly, The View and Dr. Phil. Ultimately, they lost to Wayne Brady. Further nominations occurred in 2005 and 2006.

In 2004, Treadway and Rinna hosted a TV special that pre-empted The View for one day during the 2004 Summer Olympics called SOAPnet Reveals ABC Soap Secrets. This special gave scoops about what was going to happen in the near future on All My Children, General Hospital, and One Life to Live. ABC commissioned this special in an attempt to keep its daytime Nielsen ratings up during the Olympic season. Statistically soap operas lose ten percent of their viewership in Olympic years.

Soap Talk was canceled in 2006 but returned periodically for specials.
