= Live with Regis and Kelly season 20 =

Yes	denotes that a particular segment WAS aired.
No	denotes that a particular segment WAS NOT aired.
- denotes a "Special Week" (usually a week in which the show is taken on location)
- denotes a "Special Episode"
- denotes a "Theme Week"

This is a list of Live with Regis and Kelly episodes which were broadcast during the show's 20th season, ordered by air date.

Although the co-hosts may have read a couple of emails during the broadcast, it does not necessarily count as a "Regis and Kelly Inbox" segment.

== September 2007 ==
Date	Co-Hosts	"Host Chat"	Guests/Segments
September 3	Regis Philbin & Kelly Ripa	Yes	Glenn Close, Dylan and Cole Sprouse and a segment on the series' history
September 4	Regis Philbin & Kelly Ripa	Yes	Daniel Radcliffe, Jerome Bettis, a montage of comical moments over the years
September 5	Regis Philbin & Kelly Ripa	Yes	David Duchovny, Jimmie Johnson, a segment on Regis' health
September 6	Regis Philbin & Kelly Ripa	Yes	Alan Alda, Teri Hatcher, places the show has visited over the years
September 7	Regis Philbin & Kelly Ripa	Yes	Richard Gere, Avril Lavigne, a segment on past dance trends
September 10	Regis Philbin & Kelly Ripa	Yes	Michael Douglas, Terrence Howard, Roger Federer, a look at executive producer Michael Gelman's contributions to the show over the years
September 11	Regis Philbin & Kelly Ripa	Yes	Jodie Foster, Lyle Lovett, a look at daring feats attempted on the show over the years
September 12	Regis Philbin & Kelly Ripa	Yes	Billy Bob Thornton, Fall Out Boy, a look at Art Moore through the years
September 13	Regis Philbin & Kelly Ripa	Yes	Patricia Heaton, Chris Daughtry, memorable host chats over the years
September 14	Regis Philbin & Kelly Ripa	No	LIVE's 20th Anniversary, Kathie Lee Gifford
September 17	Regis Philbin & Kelly Ripa	Yes	Morgan Freeman, Ashanti, Diana Krall
September 18	Regis Philbin & Kelly Ripa	Yes	Kelsey Grammer, Brad Garrett, KT Tunstall
September 19	Regis Philbin & Kelly Ripa	Yes	Jessica Alba, Jeff Probst, Kenneth Edmonds
September 20	Regis Philbin & Kelly Ripa	Yes	Courtney Thorne-Smith, John Edward, Rusty Wallace
September 21	Regis Philbin & Kelly Ripa	No	LIVE's 2007 Relly Awards
September 24	Regis Philbin & Kelly Ripa	Yes	Hayden Panettiere, Judy Sheindlin
September 25	Regis Philbin & Kelly Ripa	Yes	Jamie Foxx, Peter Krause
September 26	Regis Philbin & Kelly Ripa	Yes	Dwayne Johnson, Queen Latifah, Carrot Top
September 27	Regis Philbin & Kelly Ripa	Yes	Tony Bennett, Jennifer Garner, Diane Sawyer
September 28	Kelly Ripa & Pat Sajak	Yes	Sally Field, Molly Sims, Melissa Etheridge

== October 2007 ==
Date	Co-Hosts	"Host Chat"	Guests/Segments
October 1	Regis Philbin & Kelly Ripa	Yes	Adrien Brody, Christopher Meloni, animal expert Jarod Miller
October 2	Regis Philbin & Kelly Ripa	Yes	Alyssa Milano, Jerry O'Connell, a recipe by The Love Chef
October 3	Regis Philbin & Kelly Ripa	Yes	Ted Danson, Ted Koppel
October 4	Regis Philbin & Kelly Ripa	Yes	Tina Fey, Jude Law
October 5	Kelly Ripa & Sam Champion	Yes	Kyra Sedgwick, Brooks & Dunn
October 8	Regis Philbin & Kelly Ripa	Yes	Cate Blanchett, NASCAR drivers Jeff Gordon, Denny Hamlin, Kevin Harvick, Jimmie Johnson and Matt Kenseth
October 9	Regis Philbin & Kelly Ripa	Yes	Faith Ford, Mark Wahlberg, Vanessa Carlton
October 10	Regis Philbin & Kelly Ripa	Yes	Tyler Perry, Joaquin Phoenix, Taylor Swift
October 11	Regis Philbin & Kelly Ripa	Yes	Josh Hartnett, Cameron Mathison, Jill Scott
October 12	Kelly Ripa & Jeff Probst	Yes	Janet Jackson, Eva Mendes
October 15	Regis Philbin & Kelly Ripa	Yes	Christina Applegate, Jessica Seinfeld, CFA-Iams Cat Championship
October 16	Regis Philbin & Kelly Ripa	Yes	Jake Gyllenhaal, Dominic Purcell
October 17	Regis Philbin & Kelly Ripa	Yes	Anthony Hopkins, Casey Affleck
October 18	Regis Philbin & Kelly Ripa	Yes	Ben Affleck, Rebecca Romijn, LeAnn Rimes
October 19	Kelly Ripa & Mark Consuelos	Yes	Denzel Washington, interior designer Vern Yip
October 22	Kelly Ripa & Jimmy Kimmel	Yes	Ashley Tisdale, Vanna White, Adrian Pasdar
October 23	Kelly Ripa & Jimmy Kimmel	Yes	Halle Berry, Anderson Cooper
October 24	Kelly Ripa & Jimmy Kimmel	Yes	Blake Lively, Steve Carell, Carrie Underwood
October 25	Kelly Ripa & Jimmy Kimmel	Yes	Renée Zellweger, Barenaked Ladies
October 26	Kelly Ripa & Jimmy Kimmel	Yes	Kevin Bacon, Brian McKnight, Halloween treats
October 29	Regis Philbin & Kelly Ripa	Yes	Ethan Hawke, Bill O'Reilly, Halloween masks
October 30	Regis Philbin & Kelly Ripa	Yes	William Baldwin, John O'Hurley
October 31	Regis Philbin & Kelly Ripa	Yes	LIVE's 3D Halloween Spectacular, Phil McGraw, Backstreet Boys

== November 2007 ==
Date	Co-Hosts	"Host Chat"	Guests/Segments
November 1	Regis Philbin & Kelly Ripa	Yes	Jerry Seinfeld, Amanda Peet
November 2	Regis Philbin & Kelly Ripa	Yes	Marisa Tomei, Baby Bash, Damien Fahey
November 5	Regis Philbin & Kelly Ripa	Yes	Taye Diggs, James Pickens, Jr., chef Nigella Lawson
November 6	Regis Philbin & Kelly Ripa	Yes	Portia de Rossi, Dylan McDermott, Regis gets a flu shot
November 7	Regis Philbin & Kelly Ripa	Yes	Eric Dane, Tom Brokaw, Seal
November 8	Regis Philbin & Kelly Ripa	Yes	John Stamos, Vince Vaughn
November 9	Regis Philbin & Kelly Ripa	Yes	Jonathan Rhys Meyers, Paul Giamatti
November 12	Regis Philbin & Kelly Ripa	Yes	David Boreanaz, Heidi Klum, Thanksgiving Recipe Week
November 13	Regis Philbin & Kelly Ripa	Yes	Dustin Hoffman, Thanksgiving Recipe Week
November 14	Regis Philbin & Kelly Ripa	Yes	Benjamin Bratt, Alicia Keys, Thanksgiving Recipe Week
November 15	Regis Philbin & Kelly Ripa	Yes	Natalie Portman, Boyz II Men, Thanksgiving Recipe Week
November 16	Regis Philbin & Kelly Ripa	Yes	Richard Gere, Michael C. Hall, David Duchovny, Thanksgiving Recipe Week
November 19	Regis Philbin & Kelly Ripa	Yes	Dana Delany, Neil Patrick Harris
November 20	Regis Philbin & Kelly Ripa	Yes	Patrick Dempsey
November 21	Regis Philbin & Kelly Ripa	Yes	Donald Trump, Jordin Sparks
November 23	Regis Philbin & Kelly Ripa	Yes	Nicole Kidman, James Blunt
November 26	Regis Philbin & Kelly Ripa	Yes	Jessica Alba, Jimmie Johnson, Menudo
November 27	Regis Philbin & Kelly Ripa	Yes	LIVE! in The Bahamas, Tim Gunn, Jonas Brothers, Project Runway: Bahamas Edition
November 28	Regis Philbin & Kelly Ripa	Yes	LIVE! in The Bahamas, Kellie Pickler, Regis tests his tennis skills with Venus Williams as they take on Gelman and the world's #3 ranked Doubles player, Mark Knowles
November 29	Regis Philbin & Kelly Ripa	Yes	LIVE! in The Bahamas, Kyle MacLachlan, Sean Kingston, Kelly and her son Michael swim with the dolphins and visit the Aquarium's animal hospital
November 30	Regis Philbin & Kelly Ripa	Yes	LIVE! in The Bahamas, Jane Krakowski, Billy Ray Cyrus, Regis spends some quality time in the Bahamas with the children of Live, Jonny P transforms a group of audience members into smokin' hot dancers

== December 2007 ==
Date	Co-Hosts	"Host Chat"	Guests/Segments
December 3	Regis Philbin & Kelly Ripa	Yes	Keira Knightley, Masi Oka, High-Tech Gift Week
December 4	Regis Philbin & Kelly Ripa	Yes	Mario Lopez, Ben Affleck, High-Tech Gift Week
December 5	Regis Philbin & Kelly Ripa	Yes	Jennifer Jason Leigh, Laura Linney, High-Tech Gift Week
December 6	Regis Philbin & Kelly Ripa	Yes	Megan Mullally, Rob Morrow, High-Tech Gift Week
December 7	Kelly Ripa & Ted McGinley	Yes	Holly Hunter, Blake Lewis, High-Tech Gift Week
December 10	Regis Philbin & Kelly Ripa	Yes	Jason Lee, Jim Cramer, Josh Groban
December 11	Regis Philbin & Kelly Ripa	Yes	Jon Voight, Lucas Grabeel, Mannheim Steamroller
December 12	Regis Philbin & Kelly Ripa	Yes	Will Smith, Rick Springfield
December 13	Regis Philbin & Kelly Ripa	Yes	Hilary Swank, America's Next Top Model, Darlene Love
December 14	Kelly Ripa & Anderson Cooper	Yes	Nicolas Cage, Michael Bolton
December 17	Regis Philbin & Kelly Ripa	Yes	Nick Lachey, winner of Survivor: China, Holiday Survival Week
December 18	Regis Philbin & Kelly Ripa	Yes	Helen Mirren, Jenna Fischer, Holiday Survival Week
December 19	Regis Philbin & Kelly Ripa	Yes	Tom Hanks, Holiday Survival Week
December 20	Regis Philbin & Kelly Ripa	Yes	John C. Reilly, Emile Hirsch, Holiday Survival Week
December 21	Regis Philbin & Kelly Ripa	Yes	Denzel Washington, Charles Grodin, Holiday Survival Week
December 24	Regis Philbin & Kelly Ripa	Yes	LIVE's Holiday Celebration, Brad Pitt, Disney On Ice

== January 2008 ==
Date	Co-Hosts	"Host Chat"	Guests/Segments
January 7	Kelly Ripa & Pat Sajak	Yes	Carson Kressley, Hulk Hogan, Staff Fitness Challenge Week
January 8	Kelly Ripa & Pat Sajak	Yes	Lisa Rinna, Chace Crawford, Staff Fitness Challenge Week
January 9	Kelly Ripa & Mark Consuelos	Yes	Ice Cube, Kirk Franklin, Staff Fitness Challenge Week
January 10	Kelly Ripa & Howie Mandel	Yes	Donald Trump, James Marsden, Staff Fitness Challenge Week
January 11	Kelly Ripa & Howie Mandel	Yes	Edward Burns, Drew Lachey, Staff Fitness Challenge Week
January 14	Regis Philbin & Kelly Ripa	Yes	Katie Holmes, Dylan Walsh, Finger Eleven
January 15	Regis Philbin & Kelly Ripa	Yes	Hank Azaria, KT Tunstall
January 16	Regis Philbin & Kelly Ripa	Yes	Ted Danson, Catherine Bell, Soulja Boy Tell 'Em
January 17	Regis Philbin & Kelly Ripa	Yes	Queen Latifah, Katherine Heigl
January 18	Kelly Ripa & Jeff Gordon	Yes	Mario Lopez, Michael Urie
January 21	Regis Philbin & Kelly Ripa	Yes	Lucy Liu, Sophia Bush, Natasha Bedingfield
January 22	Regis Philbin & Kelly Ripa	Yes	Michael Kors, The Amazing Race winners
January 23	Regis Philbin & Kelly Ripa	Yes	Sarah Michelle Gellar, Bret Michaels
January 24	Regis Philbin & Joy Philbin	Yes	Diane Lane, Nathan Lane, Lisa Rinna
January 28	Regis Philbin & Kelly Ripa	Yes	Miss America 2008, Sara Bareilles, Healthy Hearty Football Party Week
January 29	Regis Philbin & Kelly Ripa	Yes	Carmen Electra, Jessica Alba, Healthy Hearty Football Party Week
January 30	Regis Philbin & Kelly Ripa	Yes	Susan Lucci, Julia Louis-Dreyfus, Healthy Hearty Football Party Week
January 31	Regis Philbin & Kelly Ripa	Yes	Eva Longoria, Charles Gibson, Healthy Hearty Football Party Week

== February 2008 ==
Date	Co-Hosts	"Host Chat"	Guests/Segments
February 1	Regis Philbin & Kelly Ripa	Yes	Jeffrey Tambor, Jeff Probst, Healthy Hearty Football Party Week
February 4	Regis Philbin & Kelly Ripa	Yes	Martin Lawrence, Wedding Week
February 5	Regis Philbin & Kelly Ripa	Yes	Matthew McConaughey, Bow Wow & Omarion, Wedding Week
February 6	Regis Philbin & Kelly Ripa	Yes	Kate Hudson, k.d. lang, Michael Strahan, Wedding Week
February 7	Regis Philbin & Kelly Ripa	Yes	Vince Vaughn, Brooke Shields, Lenny Kravitz, Wedding Week
February 8	Regis Philbin & Kelly Ripa	No	LIVE's Wedding 2008
February 11	Regis Philbin & Kelly Ripa	Yes	Rachel Bilson, Enrique Iglesias, Beautiful Baby Week
February 12	Regis Philbin & Kelly Ripa	Yes	Samuel L. Jackson, Maroon 5, Beautiful Baby Week
February 13	Regis Philbin & Kelly Ripa	Yes	Colin Farrell, Evangeline Lilly, Beautiful Baby Week
February 14	Regis Philbin & Kelly Ripa	Yes	Hayden Christensen, Isla Fisher, Beautiful Baby Week
February 15	Regis Philbin & Kelly Ripa	Yes	Ryan Reynolds, Ingrid Michaelson, Neil Patrick Harris, Beautiful Baby Week
February 18	Regis Philbin & Kelly Ripa	Yes	Lauren Conrad, John Larroquette, Salt-n-Pepa
February 19	Regis Philbin & Kelly Ripa	Yes	Matthew Fox, Larry the Cable Guy, Daytona 500 winner
February 20	Regis Philbin & Kelly Ripa	Yes	Dennis Quaid, four finalists of Project Runway
February 21	Regis Philbin & Kelly Ripa	Yes	Forest Whitaker, Ian Ziering
February 22	Regis Philbin & Kelly Ripa	Yes	Scarlett Johansson, Richard Roeper, Chris Byrne the Toy Guy
February 25	Regis Philbin & Kelly Ripa	Yes	LIVE! in Los Angeles, Sean Combs, Scott Baio, Regis at the Academy Awards
February 26	Regis Philbin & Kelly Ripa	Yes	LIVE! in Los Angeles, Patricia Heaton, Scott Baio, Kelly visits the set of American Idol
February 27	Regis Philbin & Kelly Ripa	Yes	LIVE! in Los Angeles, Reese Witherspoon, Simon Cowell, Anastasia the balloon-popping dog
February 28	Regis Philbin & Kelly Ripa	Yes	LIVE! in Los Angeles, Drew Carey, Raven-Symoné, Regis tours exclusive L.A. neighborhoods
February 29	Regis Philbin & Kelly Ripa	Yes	LIVE! in Los Angeles, Courteney Cox, Josh Kelley, L.A. workout at Point Mugu

== March 2008 ==
Date	Co-Hosts	"Host Chat"	Guests/Segments
March 3	Regis Philbin & Kelly Ripa	Yes	David Hyde Pierce, Jason Statham
March 4	Regis Philbin & Kelly Ripa	Yes	Amy Adams, Ivanka Trump, Michael McDonald
March 5	Regis Philbin & Kelly Ripa	Yes	Lindsay Price, Steve Carell
March 6	Regis Philbin & Kelly Ripa	Yes	Tom Colicchio, winner of Project Runway
March 7	Kelly Ripa & Bryant Gumbel	Yes	Paul Giamatti, Julianna Margulies
March 10	Regis Philbin & Kelly Ripa	Yes	Jim Carrey, animal expert Peter Gros
March 11	Regis Philbin & Kelly Ripa	Yes	Alyssa Milano, Skeet Ulrich, John Howe of the U.S. Pizza Team
March 12	Regis Philbin & Kelly Ripa	Yes	Kate Beckinsale, Parker Posey
March 13	Kelly Ripa & Anderson Cooper	Yes	Cheryl Hines, Charlize Theron, Cowboy Mouth
March 24	Regis Philbin & Joy Philbin	Yes	Emily Procter, 11th American Idol Finalist, New York Auto Show Week
March 25	Regis Philbin & Joy Philbin	Yes	Demi Moore, New York Auto Show Week
March 26	Regis Philbin & Megan Mullally	Yes	Kate Bosworth, Tom Cavanagh, New York Auto Show Week
March 27	Regis Philbin & Bernadette Peters	Yes	Four couples from Dancing with the Stars, Celebrity Apprentice finalists, New York Auto Show Week
March 31	Regis Philbin & Kelly Ripa	Yes	10th American Idol Finalist, winners of Randy Jackson Presents America's Best Dance Crew, Staff Fitness Challenge Week

== April 2008 ==
Date	Co-Hosts	"Host Chat"	Guests/Segments
April 1	Regis Philbin & Kelly Ripa	Yes	Julie Andrews, Lifehouse, Staff Fitness Challenge Week
April 2	Regis Philbin & Kelly Ripa	Yes	Jodie Foster, Avril Lavigne, Staff Fitness Challenge Week
April 3	Regis Philbin & Joy Philbin	Yes	George Clooney, Mario, Staff Fitness Challenge Week
April 4	Kelly Ripa & Anderson Cooper	Yes	Renée Zellweger, Staff Fitness Challenge Week
April 7	Regis Philbin & Kelly Ripa	Yes	Brittany Snow, 9th American Idol Finalist, Green Week
April 8	Regis Philbin & Kelly Ripa	Yes	Leona Lewis, Diane Sawyer, Green Week
April 9	Kelly Ripa & Pat Sajak	Yes	Keanu Reeves, Green Week
April 10	Kelly Ripa & Pat Sajak	Yes	Josh Radnor, Green Week
April 11	Kelly Ripa & Bryant Gumbel	Yes	David Boreanaz, Green Week, Keyshia Cole
April 14	Regis Philbin & Kelly Ripa	Yes	Laurence Fishburne, 8th American Idol Finalist, Miss USA 2008
April 15	Regis Philbin & Kelly Ripa	Yes	Milo Ventimiglia, Trevor Immelman
April 16	Regis Philbin & Kelly Ripa	Yes	Kristen Bell, Heidi Montag
April 17	Regis Philbin & Kelly Ripa	Yes	Fergie, Dancing with the Stars castoffs
April 18	Kelly Ripa & Kyle MacLachlan	Yes	Willem Dafoe, Katie Lee Joel, Prom dresses
April 21	Regis Philbin & Kelly Ripa	Yes	Neil Patrick Harris, 7th American Idol Finalist, 10-year-old chess master Nicholas Nip
April 22	Regis Philbin & Kelly Ripa	Yes	Colin Firth, Amy Poehler, Kat DeLuna
April 23	Regis Philbin & Kelly Ripa	Yes	Helen Hunt, Eric Mabius
April 24	Regis Philbin & Kelly Ripa	Yes	Sigourney Weaver, Dancing with the Stars castoffs
April 25	Regis Philbin & Kelly Ripa	Yes	Chris Meloni, John Walsh, Mariah Carey
April 28	Regis Philbin & Kelly Ripa	Yes	Robert Downey, Jr., Hilary Duff, 6th American Idol Finalist
April 29	Regis Philbin & Kelly Ripa	Yes	Patrick Dempsey, Terrence Howard, Lil Mama
April 30	Regis Philbin & Kelly Ripa	Yes	Gwyneth Paltrow, Gordon Ramsay, Taylor Swift

== May 2008 ==
Date	Co-Hosts	"Host Chat"	Guests/Segments
May 1	Regis Philbin & Kelly Ripa	Yes	Matthew Broderick, Evan Handler, Dancing with the Stars castoffs
May 2	Regis Philbin & Kelly Ripa	Yes	Carly Simon, Jeff Probst, Penn Badgley
May 5	Regis Philbin & Kelly Ripa	Yes	John Goodman, 5th American Idol Finalist
May 6	Regis Philbin & Kelly Ripa	Yes	John Walsh, Gavin DeGraw, Melina Kanakaredes
May 7	Regis Philbin & Kelly Ripa	Yes	Ashton Kutcher, Barenaked Ladies
May 8	Regis Philbin & Kelly Ripa	Yes	Liam Neeson, Emile Hirsch, Dancing with the Stars castoffs
May 9	Regis Philbin & Kelly Ripa	No	LIVE's Mom's Dream Come True Special
May 12	Regis Philbin & Kelly Ripa	Yes	Eric Dane, Survivor: Micronesia winner, 4th American Idol Finalist
May 13	Regis Philbin & Kelly Ripa	Yes	Jimmy Buffett, Mario Lopez, Duffy
May 14	Regis Philbin & Kelly Ripa	Yes	John McCain, Paulie Litt
May 15	Regis Philbin & Kelly Ripa	Yes	Montel Williams, America's Next Top Model, Dancing with the Stars castoffs
May 16	Regis Philbin & Kelly Ripa	Yes	Alyson Hannigan, Bryan Adams, the winner of the MathCounts competition for middle-school students Darryl Wu
May 19	Regis Philbin & Kelly Ripa	Yes	Jonathan Rhys Meyers, Natasha Bedingfield, Only in New York Week
May 20	Regis Philbin & Kelly Ripa	Yes	Shia LaBeouf, Sara Bareilles, Only in New York Week
May 21	Regis Philbin & Kelly Ripa	Yes	Kevin Spacey, second and third-place couples on Dancing with the Stars, Only in New York Week
May 22	Regis Philbin & Kelly Ripa	Yes	Harrison Ford, winners of Dancing with the Stars, Only in New York Week
May 23	Kelly Ripa & Neil Patrick Harris	Yes	Jesse McCartney, Alan Alda, Only in New York Week
May 26	Regis Philbin & Kelly Ripa	Yes	Dustin Hoffman, Audrina Patridge, Augustana
May 27	Regis Philbin & Kelly Ripa	Yes	Kim Cattrall, American Idol winner
May 28	Regis Philbin & Kelly Ripa	Yes	Kristin Davis, American Idol runner-up, Indianapolis 500 winner
May 29	Regis Philbin & Kelly Ripa	Yes	Sarah Jessica Parker, American Idol third-place finisher, Gardening Tips
May 30	Kelly Ripa & Pat Sajak	Yes	Cynthia Nixon

== June 2008 ==
Date	Co-Hosts	"Host Chat"	Guests/Segments
June 2	Kelly Ripa & Jeff Probst	Yes	Catherine Bell, John Leguizamo, Cirque Dreams Jungle Fantasy
June 3	Regis Philbin & Kelly Ripa	Yes	Seann William Scott, Scripps Spelling Bee, The B-52s
June 4	Regis Philbin & Kelly Ripa	Yes	Julianne Moore, Jewel, Memory Expert Brad Williams
June 5	Regis Philbin & Kelly Ripa	Yes	Adam Sandler, Mehmet Oz
June 6	Regis Philbin & Kelly Ripa	Yes	Jack Black, Grilling with the Stars
June 9	Kelly Ripa & Mario Lopez	Yes	S. Epatha Merkerson, Broadway Week
June 10	Regis Philbin & Kelly Ripa	Yes	Marisa Tomei, Cat Deeley, Broadway Week
June 11	Regis Philbin & Kelly Ripa	Yes	Michael Strahan, Broadway Week
June 12	Regis Philbin & Kelly Ripa	Yes	Jonas Brothers, Broadway Week
June 13	Regis Philbin & Kelly Ripa	Yes	Liv Tyler, Broadway Week, Grilling with the Stars
June 16	Kelly Ripa & Emeril Lagasse	Yes	Jordin Sparks, Brittany Snow
June 17	Regis Philbin & Kelly Ripa	Yes	Kelly Preston, Melanie Brown, Idina Menzel
June 18	Regis Philbin & Kelly Ripa	Yes	Steve Carell, Kate Voegele
June 19	Regis Philbin & Kelly Ripa	Yes	Mike Myers, Yael Naim
June 20	Regis Philbin & Kelly Ripa	Yes	Neil Diamond, Jack McBrayer, Grilling with the Stars
June 23	Kelly Ripa & Mark Consuelos	Yes	Chris O'Donnell, JC Chasez, Angie Stone, Dangers posed by ticks and mosquitoes
June 30	Kelly Ripa & Sam Champion	Yes	Abigail Breslin, Molly Ringwald, Summer Fun Week

== July 2008 ==
Date	Co-Hosts	"Host Chat"	Guests/Segments
July 1	Regis Philbin & Kelly Ripa	Yes	Montgomery Gentry, Summer Fun Week
July 2	Regis Philbin & Kelly Ripa	Yes	Sigourney Weaver, Summer Fun Week
July 3	Regis Philbin & Kelly Ripa	Yes	Vanessa Hudgens, Luke Perry, Summer Fun Week
July 4	Regis Philbin & Kelly Ripa	Yes	Billy Ray Cyrus, Oscar De La Hoya, Summer Fun Week, Grilling with the Stars
July 7	Regis Philbin & Kelly Ripa	Yes	Ben Kingsley, Kevin Nealon, Demi Lovato
July 8	Regis Philbin & Kelly Ripa	Yes	Kyra Sedgwick, Bernadette Peters
July 9	Regis Philbin & Kelly Ripa	Yes	LIVE's High Heel-a-thon in Central Park, Brendan Fraser
July 10	Regis Philbin & Kelly Ripa	Yes	Josh Hartnett, winner of Hell's Kitchen
July 11	Regis Philbin & Kelly Ripa	Yes	Gabrielle Union, Selma Blair, Colbie Caillat, Grilling with the Stars
July 14	Regis Philbin & Kelly Ripa	Yes	James Denton, David Ortiz, Monumental Makeover Week
July 15	Regis Philbin & Kelly Ripa	Yes	Colin Firth, Monumental Makeover Week
July 16	Regis Philbin & Kelly Ripa	Yes	Meryl Streep, Heidi Klum, Monumental Makeover Week
July 17	Regis Philbin & Kelly Ripa	Yes	Maggie Gyllenhaal, Randy Travis, Monumental Makeover Week
July 18	Regis Philbin & Kelly Ripa	Yes	Pierce Brosnan, Monumental Makeover Week
July 21	Regis Philbin & Kelly Ripa	Yes	Nick Lachey, Miss Universe 2008, Phil Mickelson
July 22	Regis Philbin & Kelly Ripa	Yes	Will Ferrell, Caroline Rhea
July 23	Regis Philbin & Kelly Ripa	Yes	Amanda Peet, Jennifer Hudson
July 24	Regis Philbin & Kelly Ripa	Yes	Aaron Eckhart, Jim Cramer
July 25	Regis Philbin & Kelly Ripa	Yes	Kasey Kahne, Grilling with the Stars
July 28	Regis Philbin & Kelly Ripa	Yes	Carson Kressley, Amber Tamblyn, Akon & Colby O'Donis
July 29	Regis Philbin & Kelly Ripa	Yes	Tim Gunn, Rick Springfield
July 30	Regis Philbin & Kelly Ripa	Yes	Kevin Costner
July 31	Regis Philbin & Kelly Ripa	Yes	Nathan Lane, Selena Gomez

== August 2008 ==
Date	Co-Hosts	"Host Chat"	Guests/Segments
August 1	Kelly Ripa & Cameron Mathison	Yes	Joan Allen, Tatum O'Neal, Grilling with the Stars
August 4	Kelly Ripa & George Lopez	Yes	America Ferrera
August 5	Kelly Ripa & Anderson Cooper	Yes	Luke Wilson, Blake Lively
August 6	Kelly Ripa & Emeril Lagasse	Yes	Dennis Hopper, Sharon Osbourne
August 7	Kelly Ripa & Seann William Scott	Yes	Penélope Cruz
August 8	Kelly Ripa & Mark Consuelos	Yes	Kiefer Sutherland, Laurie Berkner, Grilling with the Stars
August 11	Regis Philbin & Kelly Ripa	Yes	Rainn Wilson, Natasha Bedingfield, Jay Manuel
August 12	Regis Philbin & Emily Procter	Yes	Susan Sarandon, Jonas Brothers
August 13	Regis Philbin & Becki Newton	Yes	Ben Stiller
August 14	Regis Philbin & Lisa Rinna	Yes	Anna Faris, Ana Ortiz
August 15	Regis Philbin & Joanna Philbin	Yes	Robert Downey Jr., Katharine McPhee, Will Ferrell, Grilling with the Stars

== See also ==
- Live with Regis and Kelly (season 18)
- Live with Regis and Kelly (season 19)
- Live with Regis and Kelly (season 21)
- Live with Regis and Kelly (season 22)
