= Live with Regis and Kelly season 18 =

Yes	denotes that a particular segment WAS aired.
No	denotes that a particular segment WAS NOT aired.
- denotes a "Special Week" (usually a week in which the show is taken on location)
- denotes a "Special Episode"
- denotes a "Theme Week"

This is a list of Live with Regis and Kelly episodes which were broadcast during the show's 18th season. The list is ordered by air date.

Although the co-hosts may have read a couple of e-mails during the broadcast, it does not necessarily count as a "Regis and Kelly Inbox" segment.

== September 2005 ==
Date	Co-hosts	"Host Chat"	Guests/segments
September 5	Regis Philbin & Kelly Ripa	Yes	Paul Reiser, Kristin Cavallari, Avenue Q
September 6	Regis Philbin & Kelly Ripa	Yes	Doug Savant, Jamie Lynn Spears, Jamie Oliver
September 7	Regis Philbin & Kelly Ripa	Yes	Morgan Freeman, Susan Lucci, Joss Stone
September 8	Regis Philbin & Kelly Ripa	Yes	Samuel L. Jackson, Tony Danza
September 9	Regis Philbin & Kelly Ripa	Yes	Jennifer Lopez, Eugene Levy
September 12	Regis Philbin & Kelly Ripa	Yes	Eva Longoria, Hugh Laurie, Michael Bolton, Guinness World Record Breaker Week
September 13	Regis Philbin & Kelly Ripa	Yes	Joan Rivers, The Dandy Warhols, Guinness World Record Breaker Week
September 14	Regis Philbin & Kelly Ripa	Yes	Jodie Foster, Jeff Probst, Guinness World Record Breaker Week
September 15	Regis Philbin & Kelly Ripa	Yes	Reese Witherspoon, Guinness World Record Breaker Week
September 16	Regis Philbin & Kelly Ripa	Yes	Anthony Hopkins, Lara Flynn Boyle, Guinness World Record Breaker Week
September 19	Regis Philbin & Kelly Ripa	Yes	Caroline Rhea, Eddie Cibrian
September 20	Regis Philbin & Kelly Ripa	Yes	Donald Trump, Jo Frost, Ryan Cabrera
September 21	Regis Philbin & Kelly Ripa	Yes	Benjamin Bratt, Julian McMahon
September 22	Regis Philbin & Kelly Ripa	Yes	Marg Helgenberger
September 23	Regis Philbin & Kelly Ripa	No	LIVE's 2005 Relly Awards
September 26	Regis Philbin & Kelly Ripa	Yes	Denise Richards, George Lopez, Boz Scaggs
September 27	Regis Philbin & Kelly Ripa	Yes	Geena Davis, Emma Roberts, Toni Braxton
September 28	Regis Philbin & Kelly Ripa	Yes	Jessica Alba, Amanda Bynes, Gretchen Wilson
September 29	Regis Philbin & Kelly Ripa	Yes	Matt LeBlanc, Shia LaBeouf, So You Think You Can Dance castoff
September 30	Regis Philbin & Kelly Ripa	Yes	Teri Hatcher, Raven-Symoné

== October 2005 ==
Date	Co-hosts	"Host Chat"	Guests/segments
October 3	Regis Philbin & Kelly Ripa	Yes	Bill O'Reilly, Faith Ford
October 4	Regis Philbin & Kelly Ripa	Yes	Julianne Moore, Brooke Shields, Air Supply
October 5	Regis Philbin & Kelly Ripa	Yes	Freddie Prinze Jr., Clint Black, Top of the Year Awards
October 6	Regis Philbin & Kelly Ripa	Yes	Matthew McConaughey, Shannon Elizabeth, So You Think You Can Dance winner
October 7	Regis Philbin & Kelly Ripa	Yes	Common
October 10	Regis Philbin & Kelly Ripa	Yes	Denis Leary, George Huff
October 11	Regis Philbin & Kelly Ripa	Yes	Orlando Bloom, Gloria Estefan
October 12	Regis Philbin & Kelly Ripa	Yes	Kirsten Dunst
October 13	Regis Philbin & Kelly Ripa	Yes	Charlize Theron, Rev Run
October 14	Regis Philbin & Kelly Ripa	Yes	Dylan Walsh
October 17	Regis Philbin & Kelly Ripa	Yes	Dakota Fanning, Simply Red, Project Schulewis
October 18	Regis Philbin & Kelly Ripa	Yes	Stevie Wonder, Ashlee Simpson, Project Schulewis
October 19	Regis Philbin & Kelly Ripa	Yes	Woody Harrelson, Sumo Wrestlers, Project Schulewis
October 20	Regis Philbin & Kelly Ripa	Yes	Dwayne Johnson, Ricky Martin, Amerie, Project Schulewis
October 21	Regis Philbin & Kelly Ripa	Yes	Val Kilmer, Melissa Etheridge, Project Schulewis
October 24	Regis Philbin & Kelly Ripa	Yes	William Shatner, Frankie J
October 25	Regis Philbin & Kelly Ripa	Yes	Uma Thurman, Tom Joyner
October 26	Regis Philbin & Kelly Ripa	Yes	Antonio Banderas, Zach Braff
October 27	Regis Philbin & Kelly Ripa	Yes	Nicolas Cage, Courtney Thorne-Smith, Animal expert Peter Gros
October 28	Regis Philbin & Kelly Ripa	Yes	Jay Leno, a Halloween fashion show
October 31	Regis Philbin & Kelly Ripa	Yes	LIVE's Halloween Spectacular, Jamie Foxx

== November 2005 ==
Date	Co-hosts	"Host Chat"	Guests/segments
November 1	Regis Philbin & Kelly Ripa	Yes	Billy Crystal, Mike Wallace
November 2	Regis Philbin & Kelly Ripa	Yes	Terrence Howard, Philip Seymour Hoffman, Kirk Franklin
November 3	Regis Philbin & Kelly Ripa	Yes	James Spader
November 4	Regis Philbin & Kelly Ripa	Yes	Jake Gyllenhaal
November 7	Regis Philbin & Kelly Ripa	Yes	Josh Duhamel, Simon Cowell
November 8	Regis Philbin & Kelly Ripa	Yes	50 Cent, Peter Gallagher
November 9	Regis Philbin & Kelly Ripa	Yes	Melina Kanakaredes, LeAnn Rimes, Keira Knightley
November 10	Regis Philbin & Kelly Ripa	Yes	Robert Downey Jr., Carrot Top, Daniel Radcliffe
November 11	Regis Philbin & Kelly Ripa	Yes	Steve Martin, Nicole Richie, Anderson Cooper
November 14	Regis Philbin & Kelly Ripa	Yes	Richard Gere, Donald Sutherland, Joy Philbin
November 15	Regis Philbin & Kelly Ripa	Yes	Reese Witherspoon, Emma Watson
November 16	Regis Philbin & Kelly Ripa	Yes	Joaquin Phoenix, Jesse L. Martin
November 17	Regis Philbin & Kelly Ripa	Yes	Rosario Dawson
November 18	Regis Philbin & Kelly Ripa	Yes	Patricia Arquette
November 21	Regis Philbin & Kelly Ripa	Yes	Usher, Alanis Morissette
November 22	Regis Philbin & Kelly Ripa	Yes	Judy Sheindlin, Bradley Cooper
November 23	Regis Philbin & Kelly Ripa	Yes	A Seinfeld reunion featuring Jerry Seinfeld, Julia Louis-Dreyfus, Jason Alexander and Michael Richards
November 25	Regis Philbin & Kelly Ripa	Yes	Lake Bell, John Leguizamo, Jeff Garlin
November 28	Regis Philbin & Kelly Ripa	Yes	Felicity Huffman, Carl Edwards
November 29	Regis Philbin & Kelly Ripa	Yes	Barbara Walters, Tom Arnold, Scott Stapp
November 30	Regis Philbin & Kelly Ripa	Yes	Naomi Watts, Chris Brown, a segment on The Biggest Loser

== December 2005 ==
Date	Co-hosts	"Host Chat"	Guests/segments
December 1	Regis Philbin & Kelly Ripa	Yes	Alan Alda, Click Five
December 2	Regis Philbin & Kelly Ripa	Yes	Jerry Lewis
December 5	Regis Philbin & Kelly Ripa	Yes	Adrien Brody, Gisele Bündchen, Anthony Hamilton, Holiday Gift Giving Week
December 6	Regis Philbin & Kelly Ripa	Yes	Lindsay Lohan, Ashanti, Holiday Gift Giving Week
December 7	Regis Philbin & Kelly Ripa	Yes	Holiday Gift Giving Week
December 8	Regis Philbin & Kelly Ripa	Yes	Michael Rosenbaum, Anthony Hamilton, Holiday Gift Giving Week
December 9	Kelly Ripa & Mark Consuelos	Yes	Ellen Pompeo, Bo Bice, Holiday Gift Giving Week
December 12	Regis Philbin & Kelly Ripa	Yes	Charles Barkley, Il Divo, a segment on Survivor
December 13	Regis Philbin & Kelly Ripa	Yes	Jack Black, Dermot Mulroney, Constantine Maroulis
December 14	Regis Philbin & Kelly Ripa	Yes	Sarah Jessica Parker, Donald Trump
December 15	Regis Philbin & Kelly Ripa	Yes	Luke Wilson, Howie Mandel, Trans-Siberian Orchestra
December 16	Regis Philbin & Kelly Ripa	Yes	Jennifer Aniston, Michael McDonald
December 19	Regis Philbin & Joy Philbin	Yes	Johnny Knoxville, Jason Kidd, the winner of The Apprentice
December 20	Regis Philbin & Bonnie Hunt	Yes	Steve Martin, Vanessa Minnillo, B5
December 21	Regis Philbin & Kelly Ripa	Yes	Téa Leoni, Jamie Foxx
December 22	Regis Philbin & Kelly Ripa	Yes	Sienna Miller, Triple H, Claudia Cohen discusses celebrities' holiday plans
December 23	Regis Philbin & Kelly Ripa	Yes	LIVE's Holiday Celebration, Glenn Close, Barenaked Ladies, Disney on Ice

== January 2006 ==
Date	Co-hosts	"Host Chat"	Guests/segments
January 9	Regis Philbin & Kelly Ripa	Yes	Heather Graham, John Stamos
January 10	Regis Philbin & Kelly Ripa	Yes	Vanessa Williams, Anne Hathaway
January 11	Regis Philbin & Kelly Ripa	Yes	Scarlett Johansson, Evangeline Lilly, Terrence Howard
January 12	Regis Philbin & Kelly Ripa	Yes	Queen Latifah, Emily Procter
January 13	Regis Philbin & Kelly Ripa	Yes	Kyle MacLachlan, Kiefer Sutherland
January 16	Regis Philbin & Kelly Ripa	Yes	Terrence Howard, Chad Michael Murray
January 17	Regis Philbin & Kelly Ripa	Yes	Martin Lawrence, Jason Priestley
January 18	Regis Philbin & Kelly Ripa	Yes	Josh Lucas, S. Epatha Merkerson
January 19	Regis Philbin & Kelly Ripa	Yes	Rose McGowan
January 20	Kelly Ripa & Jeff Gordon	Yes	Jeff Gordon
January 23	Kelly Ripa & Sam Champion	Yes	Tia Carrere, Barney the purple dinosaur & Jennifer Berry
January 24	Kelly Ripa & D. L. Hughley	Yes	Anthony Hopkins, Natasha Bedingfield
January 25	Kelly Ripa & Bernie Mac	Yes	Emma Thompson, Il Divo
January 26	Kelly Ripa & John O'Hurley	Yes	Enya, an Oscar report by Claudia Cohen
January 30	Regis Philbin & Kelly Ripa	Yes	Kristin Cavallari, Dancing with the Stars castoffs
January 31	Regis Philbin & Kelly Ripa	Yes	Meredith Vieira, Randy Jackson

== February 2006 ==
Date	Co-hosts	"Host Chat"	Guests/segments
February 1	Regis Philbin & Kelly Ripa	Yes	Jeff Probst
February 2	Regis Philbin & Kelly Ripa	Yes	Bette Midler
February 3	Regis Philbin & Kelly Ripa	Yes	Sean Paul
February 6	Regis Philbin & Kelly Ripa	Yes	Roseanne Barr, Dancing with the Stars castoffs, Wedding Week
February 7	Regis Philbin & Kelly Ripa	Yes	Harrison Ford, Rachel Bilson, Wedding Week
February 8	Regis Philbin & Kelly Ripa	Yes	Josh Holloway, Collective Soul, Wedding Week
February 9	Regis Philbin & Kelly Ripa	Yes	Nicollette Sheridan, Wedding Week
February 10	Regis Philbin & Kelly Ripa	No	LIVE's Wedding 2006
February 13	Regis Philbin & Kelly Ripa	Yes	Diddy
February 14	Regis Philbin & Kelly Ripa	Yes	Edie Falco, Harry Connick Jr.
February 15	Regis Philbin & Kelly Ripa	Yes	Julianne Moore, INXS
February 16	Regis Philbin & Kelly Ripa	Yes	Joan Rivers
February 17	Regis Philbin & Kelly Ripa	Yes	Simon Cowell
February 20	Regis Philbin & Kelly Ripa	Yes	Cuba Gooding Jr.
February 22	Regis Philbin & Kelly Ripa	Yes	Matthew Fox, Heidi Klum
February 23	Regis Philbin & Kelly Ripa	Yes	Jimmy Fallon, Tyler Perry
February 24	Regis Philbin & Kelly Ripa	Yes	Whoopi Goldberg, Lynn Whitfield
February 27	Regis Philbin & Kelly Ripa	Yes	Donald Trump, Roger Ebert, Ray J
February 28	Regis Philbin & Kelly Ripa	Yes	LIVE! in Los Angeles, Howie Mandel, Eva Longoria, a visit to the American Idol set

== March 2006 ==
Date	Co-hosts	"Host Chat"	Guests/segments
March 1	Regis Philbin & Kelly Ripa	Yes	LIVE! in Los Angeles, Melina Kanakaredes, Jimmy Kimmel, Brian McKnight
March 2	Regis Philbin & Kelly Ripa	Yes	LIVE! in Los Angeles, Anthony LaPaglia, Bo Bice, Sasha Cohen, a visit to the set of CSI: Crime Scene Investigation
March 3	Regis Philbin & Kelly Ripa	Yes	LIVE! in Los Angeles, Raven-Symoné, William H. Macy, Behind the Scenes with Kobe Bryant and other Los Angeles Lakers
March 6	Regis Philbin & Kelly Ripa	Yes	Bill Paxton, an Oscar recap by Claudia Cohen
March 7	Regis Philbin & Kelly Ripa	Yes	Jo Frost, Dennis Haysbert, Ne-Yo
March 8	Regis Philbin & Kelly Ripa	Yes	Matthew McConaughey, Gretchen Wilson
March 9	Regis Philbin & Kelly Ripa	Yes	Salma Hayek, Bradley Cooper
March 10	Regis Philbin & Kelly Ripa	Yes	Kristin Davis, Idina Menzel
March 13	Regis Philbin & Kelly Ripa	Yes	Julia Louis-Dreyfus, Ashley Parker Angel
March 14	Regis Philbin & Kelly Ripa	Yes	Pat Sajak, Carrie Underwood
March 15	Regis Philbin & Kelly Ripa	Yes	Ice-T
March 16	Regis Philbin & Kelly Ripa	Yes	Vin Diesel, Ludacris, A report from the American International Toy Fair
March 17	Regis Philbin & Kelly Ripa	Yes	Celtic Woman
March 20	Regis Philbin & Joy Philbin	Yes	Wentworth Miller, Clive Owen, Chris Brown
March 21	Regis Philbin & Joy Philbin	Yes	Michael Chiklis, Denzel Washington
March 22	Regis Philbin & Joy Philbin	Yes	Dominic Chianese, Kurt Busch
March 23	Regis Philbin & Lisa Rinna	Yes	Frankie Muniz, Cascada
March 24	Regis Philbin & Wendie Malick	Yes	Jamie-Lynn Sigler, animal expert Peter Gros, a segment on Consumer Reports' Oyster Awards for packaging that is difficult to open
March 27	Regis Philbin & Kelly Ripa	Yes	Shakira & Wyclef Jean, Chris Kattan, Larry the Cable Guy
March 28	Regis Philbin & Kelly Ripa	Yes	Ray Romano, psychic Char Margolis
March 29	Regis Philbin & Kelly Ripa	Yes	Queen Latifah, Richard Ashcroft
March 30	Regis Philbin & Kelly Ripa	Yes	Josh Hartnett, Tori Spelling, the winner of the National Spelling Bee

== April 2006 ==
Date	Co-hosts	"Host Chat"	Guests/segments
April 3	Regis Philbin & Kelly Ripa	Yes	Antonio Banderas, Spring Fashion Week
April 4	Regis Philbin & Kelly Ripa	Yes	Rebecca Romijn, Jon Voight, Spring Fashion Week
April 5	Regis Philbin & Kelly Ripa	Yes	Lucy Liu, Spring Fashion Week
April 6	Regis Philbin & Kelly Ripa	Yes	Julianna Margulies, Mario Batali, Spring Fashion Week
April 7	Kelly Ripa & Randy Jackson	Yes	Spring Fashion Week
April 10	Regis Philbin & Kelly Ripa	Yes	Carmen Electra, New York Auto Show Week
April 11	Regis Philbin & Kelly Ripa	Yes	p!nk, Billy Crystal, New York Auto Show Week
April 12	Regis Philbin & Kelly Ripa	Yes	Vanna White, New York Auto Show Week
April 13	Regis Philbin & Kelly Ripa	Yes	Chris Rock, New York Auto Show Week
April 14	Regis Philbin & Kelly Ripa	Yes	Hugh Grant, New York Auto Show Week
April 17	Regis Philbin & Kelly Ripa	Yes	David Schwimmer, Barry Watson
April 18	Regis Philbin & Kelly Ripa	Yes	Michael Douglas, Daniel Powter
April 19	Regis Philbin & Kelly Ripa	Yes	Willem Dafoe, Drew Lachey, Avant
April 20	Regis Philbin & Kelly Ripa	Yes	Craig Ferguson, Mandy Moore, Toto
April 21	Regis Philbin & Kelly Ripa	Yes	Dennis Quaid, Rachael Ray, Cirque du Soleil
April 24	Kelly Ripa & D. L. Hughley	Yes	Brooke Burns
April 25	Regis Philbin & Kelly Ripa	Yes	Kristin Chenoweth, Rihanna
April 26	Regis Philbin & Kelly Ripa	Yes	Robin Williams, Jenny McCarthy, Michael Eisner
April 27	Regis Philbin & Kelly Ripa	Yes	Laurence Fishburne, Cheryl Hines, Paula Deen
April 28	Regis Philbin & Kelly Ripa	Yes	Tom Selleck, Goo Goo Dolls, Ashley Tisdale

== May 2006 ==
Date	Co-hosts	"Host Chat"	Guests/segments
May 1	Regis Philbin & Kelly Ripa	Yes	Ving Rhames, a report on computer-imagined hairstyles
May 2	Regis Philbin & Kelly Ripa	Yes	Jonathan Rhys Meyers, David Blaine, KT Tunstall
May 3	Regis Philbin & Kelly Ripa	Yes	Tom Cruise
May 4	Regis Philbin & Kelly Ripa	Yes	Michelle Rodriguez, Judy Sheindlin
May 5	Regis Philbin & Kelly Ripa	Yes	Teri Hatcher, Jimmy Buffett, Sam Champion
May 8	Regis Philbin & Kelly Ripa	Yes	Josh Lucas
May 9	Regis Philbin & Kelly Ripa	Yes	Jaime Pressly, Nick Lachey
May 10	Regis Philbin & Kelly Ripa	Yes	Michelle Monaghan
May 11	Regis Philbin & Kelly Ripa	Yes	Celebrating moms
May 12	Regis Philbin & Kelly Ripa	No	LIVE's Mom's Dream Come True Special
May 15	Regis Philbin & Kelly Ripa	Yes	Nicollette Sheridan, Terry O'Quinn, Jeff Probst
May 16	Regis Philbin & Kelly Ripa	Yes	James Spader, Christina Milian
May 17	Regis Philbin & Kelly Ripa	Yes	Eric McCormack, Jennifer Garner
May 18	Regis Philbin & Kelly Ripa	Yes	Jimmy Kimmel, Debra Messing
May 19	Regis Philbin & Kelly Ripa	Yes	Tom Hanks, Patricia Arquette
May 22	Regis Philbin & Kelly Ripa	Yes	LIVE! in Niagara Falls, Mary Lynn Rajskub, Ashley Parker Angel, America's Next Top Model
May 23	Regis Philbin & Kelly Ripa	Yes	LIVE! in Niagara Falls, Dean Cain
May 24	Regis Philbin & Kelly Ripa	Yes	Halle Berry
May 25	Regis Philbin & Kelly Ripa	Yes	Hugh Jackman
May 26	Regis Philbin & Kelly Ripa	Yes	LIVE! at Charlotte Motor Speedway, Paul Newman, Owen Wilson, Jesse James, Phil Vassar
May 29	Kelly Ripa & Bryant Gumbel	Yes	Jennifer Aniston, Jeanne Tripplehorn, animal expert Peter Gros
May 30	Kelly Ripa & Anderson Cooper	Yes	Mariah Carey, Larry the Cable Guy
May 31	Kelly Ripa & Donald Trump	Yes	Patricia Heaton, Indianapolis 500 winner

== June 2006 ==
Date	Co-hosts	"Host Chat"	Guests/segments
June 1	Kelly Ripa & Vince Vaughn	Yes	Denis Leary
June 2	Kelly Ripa & Jimmy Kimmel	Yes	Famke Janssen, Sandra Bernhard, Grill Friday
June 5	Regis Philbin & Kelly Ripa	Yes	Kevin Connolly, Anna Paquin, Broadway Week
June 6	Regis Philbin & Kelly Ripa	Yes	Ludacris, Julia Stiles, Broadway Week
June 7	Regis Philbin & Kelly Ripa	Yes	Liev Schreiber, winner of The Apprentice, Broadway Week
June 8	Regis Philbin & Kelly Ripa	Yes	Charles Gibson, Kyra Sedgwick, Broadway Week
June 9	Regis Philbin & Kelly Ripa	Yes	Kevin Dillon, Bonnie Hunt, Broadway Week, Grill Friday
June 12	Regis Philbin & Kelly Ripa	Yes	Julie Andrews, Lauren Conrad
June 13	Regis Philbin & Kelly Ripa	Yes	Paris Hilton, Janice Dickinson
June 14	Regis Philbin & Kelly Ripa	Yes	Rita Wilson
June 15	Regis Philbin & Kelly Ripa	Yes	Keanu Reeves, a Father's Day report by Claudia Cohen
June 16	Regis Philbin & Kelly Ripa	Yes	Sandra Bullock, David Krumholtz, Grill Friday
June 20	Kelly Ripa & Jeff Gordon	Yes	Miley Cyrus, Wendie Malick, Corinne Bailey Rae
June 21	Regis Philbin & Kelly Ripa	Yes	All-American Rejects
June 22	Regis Philbin & Kelly Ripa	Yes	Adam Sandler, The Toy Guy Chris Byrne
June 23	Regis Philbin & Kelly Ripa	Yes	Kate Beckinsale, Grill Friday
June 26	Kelly Ripa & Carson Kressley	Yes	Def Leppard
June 27	Regis Philbin & Kelly Ripa	Yes	Meryl Streep, Brandon Routh
June 28	Regis Philbin & Kelly Ripa	Yes	Kate Bosworth
June 29	Regis Philbin & Kelly Ripa	Yes	Anne Hathaway, India.Arie
June 30	Regis Philbin & Kelly Ripa	Yes	Stanley Tucci, an update on Britain's royal family by Claudia Cohen, Grill Friday

== July 2006 ==
Date	Co-hosts	"Host Chat"	Guests/segments
July 3	Regis Philbin & Kelly Ripa	Yes	Jeremy Piven, Alexis Bledel, summer-entertainment advice
July 4	Regis Philbin & Kelly Ripa	Yes	Performances by 2006 American Idol contestants including Kevin Covais, Mandisa, Kellie Pickler, Paris Bennett, Chris Daughtry, Elliott Yamin, Katharine McPhee and Taylor Hicks
July 5	Regis Philbin & Kelly Ripa	Yes	Robert Downey Jr., James Marsden
July 6	Regis Philbin & Kelly Ripa	Yes	Orlando Bloom
July 7	Regis Philbin & Kelly Ripa	Yes	Bernadette Peters, piñata-party tips from Ingrid Hoffmann, psychic John Edward, Grill Friday
July 10	Regis Philbin & Kelly Ripa	Yes	Tristan Rogers, Sugar Ray Leonard
July 11	Regis Philbin & Kelly Ripa	Yes	Marlon, Shawn & Keenen Ivory Wayans, Venus Williams
July 12	Regis Philbin & Kelly Ripa	Yes	Heidi Klum, Cheyenne Kimball
July 13	Regis Philbin & Kelly Ripa	Yes	Owen Wilson, Rainn Wilson
July 14	Regis Philbin & Kelly Ripa	Yes	Grill Friday
July 17	Regis Philbin & Kelly Ripa	Yes	Luke Wilson
July 18	Regis Philbin & Kelly Ripa	Yes	Paul Giamatti, Kevin Smith
July 19	Regis Philbin & Kelly Ripa	Yes	Rosario Dawson
July 20	Regis Philbin & Kelly Ripa	Yes	Bo Bice, Uma Thurman
July 21	Regis Philbin & Kelly Ripa	Yes	Rescue Me Dream Team Ambush Makeovers, Grill Friday
July 24	Regis Philbin & Kelly Ripa	Yes	Cameron Mathison, Dulé Hill
July 25	Regis Philbin & Kelly Ripa	Yes	Ashanti, Colin Farrell, a kids soapbox derby
July 26	Regis Philbin & Kelly Ripa	Yes	Jamie Foxx, Miss Universe
July 27	Regis Philbin & Kelly Ripa	Yes	Jesse Metcalfe
July 28	Kelly Ripa & Geraldo Rivera	Yes	Flavor Flav, LeToya, a kids bowling competition, Grill Friday
July 31	Regis Philbin & Kelly Ripa	Yes	Jewel, Christopher Meloni, Raven-Symoné

== August 2006 ==
Date	Co-hosts	"Host Chat"	Guests/segments
August 1	Regis Philbin & Kelly Ripa	Yes	Will Ferrell, Paula DeAnda
August 2	Regis Philbin & Kelly Ripa	Yes	John C. Reilly, Stephon Marbury, Cherish
August 3	Regis Philbin & Kelly Ripa	Yes	Danny DeVito, Five for Fighting
August 4	Kelly Ripa & Martin Short	Yes	Dale Earnhardt Jr., Ziggy Marley, Michael Nouri, Grill Friday
August 7	Regis Philbin & Kelly Ripa	Yes	Maggie Gyllenhaal, Kristen Bell, Jody Watley
August 8	Regis Philbin & Kelly Ripa	Yes	Christina Milian, Hulk Hogan, Eddie Money
August 9	Regis Philbin & Kelly Ripa	Yes	Elisha Cuthbert
August 10	Regis Philbin & Kelly Ripa	Yes	Michelle Wie, Rick Springfield, winner of Last Comic Standing
August 11	Kelly Ripa & Emeril Lagasse	Yes	Loverboy, Grill Friday
August 14	Regis Philbin & Kelly Ripa	Yes	Julianna Margulies, Cassie, The World's Greatest Family Recipe Search
August 15	Regis Philbin & Kelly Ripa	Yes	Samuel L. Jackson, George Thorogood
August 16	Regis Philbin & Kelly Ripa	Yes	Hilary Duff, Joan Rivers
August 17	Kelly Ripa & Chris Isaak	Yes	Dominic Purcell, Fantasia Barrino

== See also ==
- Live with Regis and Kelly
- Live with Regis and Kelly (season 19)
- Live with Regis and Kelly (season 20)
- Live with Regis and Kelly (season 21)
- Live with Regis and Kelly (season 22)
