= Live with Regis and Kelly season 21 =

Yes	denotes that a particular segment WAS aired.
No	denotes that a particular segment WAS NOT aired.
- denotes a "Special Week" (usually a week in which the show is taken on location)
- denotes a "Special Episode"
- denotes a "Theme Week"

This is a list of Live with Regis and Kelly episodes which were broadcast during the show's 21st season. The list is ordered by air date.

Although the co-hosts may have read a couple of emails during the broadcast, it does not necessarily count as a "Regis and Kelly Inbox" segment.

== September 2008 ==
Date	Co-Hosts	"Host Chat"	Guests/Segments
September 1	Regis Philbin & Kelly Ripa	Yes	Benjamin Bratt, Leighton Meester, and LaDainian Tomlinson
September 2	Regis Philbin & Kelly Ripa	Yes	Jeremy Piven, Lori Loughlin, and Live's A Beach Travel Trivia Grand Prize Drawing
September 3	Regis Philbin & Kelly Ripa	Yes	Kevin Connolly, David Boreanaz, and Leona Lewis
September 4	Regis Philbin & Kelly Ripa	Yes	Jerry O'Connell, Dr. Phil, and Vivica A. Fox
September 5	Regis Philbin & Kelly Ripa	Yes	Shannen Doherty and Rachael Ray
September 8	Regis Philbin & Kelly Ripa	Yes	Howie Mandel and Chace Crawford
September 9	Regis Philbin & Kelly Ripa	Yes	Keira Knightley and Gavin DeGraw
September 10	Regis Philbin & Kelly Ripa	Yes	Shirley MacLaine and Wayne Brady
September 11	Regis Philbin & Kelly Ripa	Yes	Meg Ryan and Jon Hamm
September 12	Kelly Ripa & Jeff Probst	Yes	Eva Mendes and Chris Meloni
September 15	Regis Philbin & Kelly Ripa	Yes	Ricky Gervais and Guinness World Record Breaker Week
September 16	Regis Philbin & Kelly Ripa	Yes	Samuel L. Jackson and Guinness World Record Breaker Week
September 17	Regis Philbin & Kelly Ripa	Yes	Andrew McCarthy and Guinness World Record Breaker Week
September 18	Regis Philbin & Kelly Ripa	Yes	Dana Delany, Dwyane Wade, and Guinness World Record Breaker Week
September 19	Kelly Ripa & Kyle MacLachlan	Yes	Michael Chiklis, Kristy Lee Cook, and Guinness World Record Breaker Week
September 22	Regis Philbin & Kelly Ripa	Yes	Kevin Dillon, David Blaine, and 2008 Relly Awards
September 23	Regis Philbin & Kelly Ripa	Yes	Diane Lane, Poppy Montgomery, and 2008 Relly Awards
September 24	Regis Philbin & Kelly Ripa	Yes	Richard Gere, America Ferrera, and 2008 Relly Awards
September 25	Regis Philbin & Kelly Ripa	Yes	Chris Rock, Vanessa Williams, and 2008 Relly Awards
September 26	Kelly Ripa & Nick Lachey	Yes	Victoria Beckham, Usain Bolt, and 2008 Relly Awards
September 29	Regis Philbin & Kelly Ripa	Yes	Brooke Shields and Ali Larter
September 30	Regis Philbin & Kelly Ripa	Yes	Julia Louis-Dreyfus and Alonzo Mourning

== October 2008 ==
Date	Co-Hosts	"Host Chat"	Guests/Segments	"Regis and Kelly Inbox"
October 1	Regis Philbin & Kelly Ripa	Yes	Kate Walsh, Kellie Pickler, and Quaker Oatmeal Dance Your Heart Out	No
October 2	Regis Philbin & Kelly Ripa	Yes	Jo Frost, Diane Sawyer, and Quaker Oatmeal Dance Your Heart Out	No
October 3	Kelly Ripa & Mark Consuelos	Yes	Blair Underwood, Jon & Kate Plus 8, and Robin Thicke	No
October 6	Regis Philbin & Kelly Ripa	Yes	Alicia Keys, John Lithgow, and Quaker Oatmeal Dance Your Heart Out	No
October 7	Regis Philbin & Kelly Ripa	Yes	Toy of the year Awards, Gary Sinise, and Sarah McLachlan	No
October 8	Regis Philbin & Kelly Ripa	Yes	Debra Messing, Bill O'Reilly, and Project Runway Finalists	No
October 9	Regis Philbin & Kelly Ripa	Yes	Molly Shannon and Peter Gros	No
October 10	Regis Philbin & Kelly Ripa	Yes	Russell Crowe and Isaac Mizrahi	No
October 13	Kelly Ripa & Randy Jackson	Yes	Christian Slater and Ed Westwick	Yes
October 14	Kelly Ripa & Anderson Cooper	Yes	Queen Latifah, Rusty Wallace, and Nobu Matsuhisa	No
October 15	Kelly Ripa & Anderson Cooper	Yes	James Marsden and Michael Urie	Yes
October 16	Kelly Ripa & Bryant Gumbel	Yes	Edward Norton, Bernadette Peters, and Project Runway Winner	Yes
October 17	Kelly Ripa & Howie Mandel	Yes	Kim Raver and Billy Bob Thornton & The Boxermasters	Yes
October 20	Regis Philbin & Kelly Ripa	Yes	Judge Judy, Corbin Bleu, and CFA-Iams Cat Championship	No
October 21	Regis Philbin & Kelly Ripa	Yes	Vanessa Hudgens, Jason O'Mara, and Gavin Rossdale	No
October 22	Regis Philbin & Kelly Ripa	Yes	Zac Efron and Shawn Johnson	No
October 23	Regis Philbin & Kelly Ripa	Yes	Whoopi Goldberg and Ashley Tisdale	Yes
October 24	Kelly Ripa & Michael Chiklis	Yes	Gisele Bündchen and John Slattery	No
October 27	Regis Philbin & Kelly Ripa	Yes	Marcia Cross and Katie Brown	Yes
October 28	Regis Philbin & Kelly Ripa	Yes	Charles Gibson, Tom Nardone, and Craig Horner	No
October 29	Regis Philbin & Kelly Ripa	Yes	Jane Krakowski, Halloween Masks!, and Dorothy Peterson	No
October 30	Regis Philbin & Kelly Ripa	Yes	Tina Fey and "Kids of Live" Fashion Show	Yes
October 31	Regis Philbin & Kelly Ripa	Yes	LIVE's Star Studded Halloween, Mario Lopez, Guy Fieri, and Halloween Costume Contest	No

== November 2008 ==
Date	Co-Hosts	"Host Chat"	Guests/Segments	"Regis and Kelly Inbox"
November 3	Regis Philbin & Kelly Ripa	Yes	David Schwimmer and Plain White T's	Yes
November 4	Regis Philbin & Kelly Ripa	Yes	Robert Wagner and Miranda Cosgrove	Yes
November 5	Regis Philbin & Kelly Ripa	Yes	Seann William Scott and Cedric the Entertainer	No
November 6	Regis Philbin & Kelly Ripa	Yes	Paul Rudd and Dr. Laura Fisher	No
November 7	Regis Philbin & Kelly Ripa	Yes	Ben Stiller and Dido	Yes
November 10	Regis Philbin & Kelly Ripa	Yes	Jeff Goldblum and Regis & Kelly Do It Week	No
November 11	Regis Philbin & Kelly Ripa	Yes	Misty May-Treanor, Seal, and Regis & Kelly Do It Week	No
November 12	Regis Philbin & Kelly Ripa	Yes	Daniel Craig, David Archuleta, and Regis & Kelly Do It Week	Yes
November 13	Regis Philbin & Kelly Ripa	Yes	Don Rickles, Miley Cyrus, and Regis & Kelly Do It Week	No
November 14	Regis Philbin & Kelly Ripa	Yes	John Travolta, Quincy Jones, and Regis & Kelly Do It Week	No
November 17	Regis Philbin & Kelly Ripa	Yes	Jenny McCarthy, Milo Ventimiglia, Miss J. Alexander, and Holiday S.O.S. Week	No
November 18	Regis Philbin & Kelly Ripa	Yes	2008 NASCAR Sprint Cup Series, Enrique Iglesias, and Holiday S.O.S. Week	No
November 19	Regis Philbin & Kelly Ripa	Yes	David Cook and Holiday S.O.S. Week	Yes
November 20	Regis Philbin & Kelly Ripa	Yes	Jimmy Smits, America's Next Top Model Winner, and Holiday S.O.S. Week	No
November 21	Regis Philbin & Kelly Ripa	Yes	Kiefer Sutherland, Il Divo, and Holiday S.O.S. Week	No
November 24	Regis Philbin & Kelly Ripa	Yes	Reese Witherspoon, and Thanksgiving Three Ways	No
November 25	Regis Philbin & Kelly Ripa	Yes	Nicole Kidman, Thanksgiving Three Ways, and Tom Jones	No
November 26	Regis Philbin & Kelly Ripa	Yes	Hugh Jackman, Kristen Stewart, and Thanksgiving Three Ways	Yes
November 28	Regis Philbin & Kelly Ripa	Yes	Felicity Huffman, Paula Deen, and Carrot Top	No

== December 2008 ==
Date	Co-Hosts	"Host Chat"	Guests/Segments	"Regis and Kelly Inbox"
December 1	Regis Philbin & Kelly Ripa	Yes	Marisa Tomei and Jesse McCartney	Yes
December 2	Regis Philbin & Kelly Ripa	Yes	Heidi Klum, Barenaked Ladies, and Terry Fator	No
December 3	Regis Philbin & Kelly Ripa	Yes	John Leguizamo and Aretha Franklin	No
December 4	Regis Philbin & Kelly Ripa	Yes	Kevin Bacon, The Bacon Brothers, and George Hamilton	No
December 8	Regis Philbin & Kelly Ripa	Yes	William Shatner and The Amazing Race Winners	Yes
December 9	Regis Philbin & Kelly Ripa	Yes	Jennifer Connelly and Freddy Rodriguez	Yes
December 10	Regis Philbin & Kelly Ripa	Yes	Amy Adams and Jason Mraz	No
December 11	Regis Philbin & Kelly Ripa	Yes	Keanu Reeves and Anderson Cooper	No
December 12	Kelly Ripa & Anderson Cooper	Yes	Debra Messing and Michael Phelps	No
December 15	Regis Philbin & Kelly Ripa	Yes	Rosario Dawson, Ken Mink, and Survivor: Gabon Winner	Yes
December 16	Regis Philbin & Kelly Ripa	Yes	Kelly's Holiday Show Tour and Adam Sandler	Yes
December 17	Regis Philbin & Kelly Ripa	Yes	Tom Cruise and Jamie Foxx	No
December 18	Regis Philbin & Kelly Ripa	Yes	Jennifer Aniston and Enya	No
December 19	Regis Philbin & Kelly Ripa	Yes	Eva Mendes and Alan Alda	No
December 22	Regis Philbin & Kelly Ripa	Yes	Dustin Hoffman, Frank Gifford, Masi Oka, and Il Divo	No
December 23	Regis Philbin & Kelly Ripa	Yes	LIVE's Holiday Celebration, Eric Dane, Faith Ford, Disney On Ice, Jason Mraz	No
December 24, 2008	Regis Philbin & Kelly Ripa	Yes	LIVE's Christmas Eve Flashback	No

== January 2009 ==
Date	Co-Hosts	"Host Chat"	Guests/Segments	"Regis and Kelly Inbox"
January 5	Regis Philbin & Kelly Ripa	Yes	Anne Hathaway, Lisa Rinna, and Feeling Fine in '09	Yes
January 6	Regis Philbin & Kelly Ripa	Yes	Kate Hudson and Feeling Fine in '09	Yes
January 7	Regis Philbin & Kelly Ripa	Yes	Glenn Close and Feeling Fine in '09	Yes
January 8	Regis Philbin & Kelly Ripa	Yes	Kevin James and Feeling Fine in '09	Yes
January 9	Kelly Ripa & Howie Mandel	Yes	Kiefer Sutherland and Feeling Fine in '09	No
January 12	Regis Philbin & Kelly Ripa	Yes	Joan Rivers and Save a Dime in '09	Yes
January 13	Regis Philbin & Kelly Ripa	Yes	Zach Braff and Save a Dime in '09	Yes
January 14	Regis Philbin & Kelly Ripa	Yes	Daniel Craig and Save a Dime in '09	Yes
January 15	Regis Philbin & Kelly Ripa	Yes	Kate Winslet and Save a Dime in '09	Yes
January 16	Regis Philbin & Kelly Ripa	Yes	Brendan Fraser and Save a Dime in '09	Yes
January 19	Regis Philbin & Kelly Ripa	Yes	Kyra Sedgwick, Brody Jenner, and Kara DioGuardi	No
January 21	Regis Philbin & Kelly Ripa	Yes	George Stephanopoulos, William H. Macy, and Watch to Win Contest Winner	Yes
January 22	Regis Philbin & Kelly Ripa	Yes	Mira Sorvino and Fall Out Boy	No
January 23	Kelly Ripa & Anderson Cooper	Yes	Eric McCormack	No
January 26	Regis Philbin & Kelly Ripa	Yes	Miss America 2009, Joshua Jackson, and Ultimate Game Day Grub Week	No
January 27	Regis Philbin & Kelly Ripa	Yes	Harry Connick, Jr. and Ultimate Game Day Grub Week	Yes
January 28	Regis Philbin & Kelly Ripa	Yes	Evangeline Lilly and Ultimate Game Day Grub Week	Yes
January 29	Regis Philbin & Kelly Ripa	Yes	Renée Zellweger, Demi Lovato, and Ultimate Game Day Grub Week	No
January 30	Kelly Ripa & Ted McGinley	Yes	Mary-Louise Parker and Ultimate Game Day Grub Week	No

== February 2009 ==
Date	Co-Hosts	"Host Chat"	Guests/Segments	"Regis and Kelly Inbox"
February 2	Regis Philbin & Kelly Ripa	Yes	Teri Hatcher and Mel B	Yes
February 3	Regis Philbin & Kelly Ripa	Yes	Steve Martin and Anil Kapoor	No
February 4	Regis Philbin & Kelly Ripa	Yes	Katie Couric and Joe Torre	No
February 5	Regis Philbin & Kelly Ripa	Yes	Stockard Channing and Dierks Bentley	Yes
February 9	Regis Philbin & Kelly Ripa	Yes	Tony Parker, Andy Samberg, and Will You Marry Me Week	No
February 10	Regis Philbin & Kelly Ripa	Yes	Isla Fisher, Chef Gordon Ramsay, and Will You Marry Me Week	No
February 11	Regis Philbin & Kelly Ripa	Yes	Santonio Holmes, Annie Lennox, and Will You Marry Me Week	No
February 12	Regis Philbin & Kelly Ripa	Yes	Naomi Watts, Eliza Dushku, and Will You Marry Me Week	No
February 16	Regis Philbin & Kelly Ripa	Yes	Jonas Brothers, Freida Pinto, and Dating with the Stars Week	No
February 17	Regis Philbin & Joy Philbin	Yes	Molly Sims, Dating with the Stars, and Daytona 500 Winner	No
February 18	Regis Philbin & Becki Newton	Yes	Barbara Walters, Neal McDonough, and Dating with the Stars	No
February 19	Regis Philbin & Kelly Ripa	Yes	Kevin Bacon, New Kids on the Block, and Dating with the Stars Week	No
February 20	Kelly Ripa & Randy Jackson	Yes	Selma Blair, Chris Byrne, and Dating with the Stars Week	Yes
February 26	Kelly Ripa & Anderson Cooper	Yes	Donald Trump and 3 Doors Down	No
February 27	Kelly Ripa & Anderson Cooper	Yes	Tom Selleck and Top Chef Winner	No

== March 2009 ==
Date	Co-Hosts	"Host Chat"	Guests/Segments	"Regis and Kelly Inbox"
March 2	Regis Philbin & Kelly Ripa	Yes	David Spade	No
March 3	Regis Philbin & Kelly Ripa	Yes	Cynthia Nixon and Van Morrison	No
March 4	Regis Philbin & Kelly Ripa	Yes	Carla Gugino and Caroline Rhea	No
March 5	Regis Philbin & Kelly Ripa	Yes	Ted Danson and Bruno Tonioli	No
March 6	Regis Philbin & Kelly Ripa	Yes	Felicity Huffman and Dylan and Cole Sprouse	No
March 9	Regis Philbin & Kelly Ripa	Yes	Dwayne Johnson and Beautiful Baby Week	No
March 10	Regis Philbin & Kelly Ripa	Yes	Marcia Cross, Whitney Port and Beautiful Baby Week	No
March 11	Regis Philbin & Kelly Ripa	Yes	David Boreanaz, Corbin Bleu and Beautiful Baby Week	No
March 12	Regis Philbin & Kelly Ripa	Yes	Paul Rudd, Pussycat Dolls and Beautiful Baby Week	No
March 13	Regis Philbin & Kelly Ripa	Yes	Larry the Cable Guy, Kelly Clarkson and Beautiful Baby Week	No
March 16	Regis Philbin & Kelly Ripa	Yes	Drew Carey and 12th American Idol Finalist	Yes
March 17	Regis Philbin & Kelly Ripa	Yes	Nicolas Cage and The Priests	No
March 18	Regis Philbin & Kelly Ripa	Yes	Julia Roberts and LeAnn Rimes	No
March 19	Regis Philbin & Kelly Ripa	Yes	Craig Ferguson, Jason Segel, and Dancing with the Stars	No
March 20	Regis Philbin & Kelly Ripa	Yes	Clive Owen, Keke Palmer, and Gavin DeGraw	No
March 23	Regis Philbin & Kelly Ripa	Yes	Kathryn Morris, 11th American Idol Finalist, and Bad Hair Week	No
March 24	Regis Philbin & Kelly Ripa	Yes	Kiefer Sutherland and Bad Hair Week	No
March 25	Regis Philbin & Kelly Ripa	Yes	Reese Witherspoon, Martina McBride, and Bad Hair Week	No
March 26	Regis Philbin & Kelly Ripa	Yes	Christina Applegate, Dancing with the Stars, and Bad Hair Week	No
March 27	Regis Philbin & Kelly Ripa	Yes	Seth Rogen and Bad Hair Week	No
March 30	Regis Philbin & Kelly Ripa	Yes	Hugh Laurie, 10th American Idol Finalist and Are You Kidding Me? Whiz Kid Challenge	No
March 31	Regis Philbin & Kelly Ripa	Yes	Sharon and Ozzy Osbourne, John Cena and Are You Kidding Me? Whiz Kid Challenge	No

== April 2009 ==
Date	Co-Hosts	"Host Chat"	Guests/Segments	"Regis and Kelly Inbox"
April 1	Regis Philbin & Kelly Ripa	Yes	Michael J. Fox, Cloris Leachman, Diana Krall and Are You Kidding Me? Whiz Kid Challenge	No
April 2	Regis Philbin & Kelly Ripa	Yes	Marg Helgenberger, Dancing with the Stars and Are You Kidding Me? Whiz Kid Challenge	No
April 3	Kelly Ripa & Nick Lachey	Yes	Vin Diesel, Prom dresses and Are You Kidding Me? Whiz Kid Challenge	No
April 6	Regis Philbin & Kelly Ripa	Yes	LIVE! in New Orleans, Emeril Lagasse, Chris Paul, 9th American Idol Finalist and The Rebirth Brass Band	No
April 7	Regis Philbin & Kelly Ripa	Yes	LIVE! in New Orleans, Faith Ford, Reggie Bush, Jesse McCartney and The Storyville Stompers	Yes
April 8	Regis Philbin & Kelly Ripa	Yes	LIVE! in New Orleans, Billy Ray Cyrus, Harry Hamlin and Big Sam's Funky Nation	Yes
April 9	Regis Philbin & Kelly Ripa	Yes	LIVE! in New Orleans, Miley Cyrus, Faith Ford and Rockin' Dopsie Jr. & The Zydeco Twisters	No
April 10	Regis Philbin & Kelly Ripa	Yes	Diane Sawyer, Chelsea Handler, Brenda Song, Annie Lennox	No
April 13	Regis Philbin & Kelly Ripa	Yes	Nancy O'Dell, 8th American Idol Finalist, and New York Auto Show Week	No
April 14	Regis Philbin & Kelly Ripa	Yes	Kathie Lee Gifford and New York Auto Show Week	No
April 15	Kelly Ripa & Mark Consuelos	Yes	Russell Crowe and New York Auto Show Week	No
April 16	Regis Philbin & Joy Philbin	Yes	Ben Affleck and New York Auto Show Week	No
April 17	Kelly Ripa & Mark Consuelos	Yes	Drew Barrymore and New York Auto Show Week	Yes
April 20	Regis Philbin & Kelly Ripa	Yes	Chevy Chase, Daniel Dae Kim, and Green Week	No
April 21	Regis Philbin & Kelly Ripa	Yes	Jimmy Fallon, Neil Sedaka, and Green Week	No
April 22	Regis Philbin & Kelly Ripa	Yes	Jennifer Lopez, Brooke Shields, Cirque du Soleil, and Green Week	No
April 23	Regis Philbin & Kelly Ripa	Yes	Amy Poehler, Roselyn Sánchez, and Green Week	No
April 24	Kelly Ripa & Neil Patrick Harris	Yes	Jamie Foxx, Ali Larter, and Green Week	No
April 27	Regis Philbin & Kelly Ripa	Yes	Allison Janney, 7th American Idol Finalist, 6th American Idol Finalist, and Broadway Week	No
April 28	Regis Philbin & Kelly Ripa	Yes	Matthew Fox, Jill Hennessy, and Broadway Week	No
April 29	Regis Philbin & Kelly Ripa	Yes	Matthew McConaughey and Broadway Week	Yes
April 30	Regis Philbin & Kelly Ripa	Yes	Hugh Jackman, Dancing with the Stars and Broadway Week	No

== May 2009 ==
Date	Co-Hosts	"Host Chat"	Guests/Segments	"Regis and Kelly Inbox"
May 1	Regis Philbin & Kelly Ripa	Yes	Jennifer Garner and Broadway Week	Yes
May 4	Regis Philbin & Kelly Ripa	Yes	Jonathan Rhys Meyers, Zachary Quinto, and Ciara	Yes
May 5	Regis Philbin & Kelly Ripa	Yes	LIVE! in Miami, Nicole Richie, Dr. Ana Maria Polo, DJ Danny Daze and Regis visits some of the most legendary spots of Miami Beach then and now	No
May 6	Regis Philbin & Kelly Ripa	Yes	LIVE! in Miami, Rob Lowe, 5th American Idol Finalist, Marlins Manatees, DJ Danny Daze and Kelly Goes Miami Wild	No
May 7	Regis Philbin & Kelly Ripa	Yes	LIVE! in Miami, Eric Dane, Dancing with the Stars, DJ Danny Daze and Regis and Kelly Spoil Miami's Moms	Yes
May 8	Regis Philbin & Kelly Ripa	No	LIVE's Mom's Dream Come True Special	No
May 11	Regis Philbin & Kelly Ripa	Yes	Eric Bana, 4th American Idol Finalist, and Winners Week	Yes
May 12	Regis Philbin & Kelly Ripa	Yes	Tom Hanks and Winners Week	No
May 13	Regis Philbin & Kelly Ripa	Yes	Ewan McGregor, Jewel, and Winners Week	No
May 14	Regis Philbin & Kelly Ripa	Yes	Jeff Probst, Winners Week	Yes
May 15	Regis Philbin & Kelly Ripa	Yes	Nathan Lane and Winners Week	Yes
May 18	Regis Philbin & Kelly Ripa	Yes	Simon Baker and Survivor winner	Yes
May 19	Regis Philbin & Kelly Ripa	Yes	Ben Stiller and Jesse James	Yes
May 20	Regis Philbin & Kelly Ripa	Yes	Ricky Gervais and Dancing with the Stars	Yes
May 21	Regis Philbin & Kelly Ripa	Yes	Susan Sarandon and Dancing with the Stars	Yes
May 22	Regis Philbin & Kelly Ripa	Yes	Matthew Broderick and Bridget Regan	No
May 25	Kelly Ripa & Jimmy Kimmel	Yes	Heidi & Spencer Pratt, and Chris Byrne	Yes
May 26	Regis Philbin & Kelly Ripa	Yes	American Idol winner and Indianapolis 500 winner	Yes
May 27	Regis Philbin & Kelly Ripa	Yes	American Idol Runner-Up and Dr. Greg Yapalater	Yes
May 28	Regis Philbin & Kelly Ripa	Yes	American Idol 3rd Place and Jeff Daniels	Yes
May 29	Regis Philbin & Kelly Ripa	Yes	Marcia Gay Harden, Cat Deeley and The Love Chef	Yes

== June 2009 ==
Date	Co-Hosts	"Host Chat"	Guests/Segments	"Regis and Kelly Inbox"
June 1	Kelly Ripa & Pat Sajak	Yes	John Goodman and Jillian Harris	No
June 2	Kelly Ripa & Pat Sajak	Yes	Kyra Sedgwick and Scripps Spelling Bee	No
June 3	Kelly Ripa & Will Ferrell	Yes	Peter Gros and MC Hammer	Yes
June 4	Kelly Ripa & Anderson Cooper	Yes	Denise Richards and Jeffrey Donovan	No
June 5	Kelly Ripa & Anderson Cooper	Yes	Bradley Cooper, Catherine Bell, and Ultimate Hometown Grill Off	No
June 8	Kelly Ripa & Mark Consuelos	Yes	Wilmer Valderrama and Imagination Movers	No
June 9	Regis Philbin & Kelly Ripa	Yes	Jeff Gordon and Michael Vartan	No
June 10	Regis Philbin & Kelly Ripa	Yes	Alan Alda and Dr. Greg Yapalater	No
June 11	Regis Philbin & Kelly Ripa	Yes	John Krasinski and Betty White	No
June 12	Regis Philbin & Kelly Ripa	Yes	Denzel Washington and Ultimate Hometown Grill Off	No
June 15	Regis Philbin & Megan Mullally	Yes	Jack Black and Summer School Pop Quiz	Yes
June 16	Regis Philbin & Molly Shannon	Yes	Selena Gomez and Summer School Pop Quiz	No
June 17	Regis Philbin & Joy Philbin	Yes	Sandra Bullock and Summer School Pop Quiz	No
June 18	Regis Philbin & Joy Philbin	Yes	Ryan Reynolds, Summer School Pop Quiz and Ultimate Hometown Grill Off	No
June 23	Regis Philbin & Kara DioGuardi	Yes	Nick Cannon, Lucas Glover, and Ashanti	No
June 24	Regis Philbin & Bernadette Peters	Yes	Cameron Diaz and Mark Feuerstein	Yes
June 25	Regis Philbin & Joanna Philbin	Yes	Shia LaBeouf and Il Divo	No
June 26	Regis Philbin & William Shatner	Yes	Ray Romano, Megan Fox, and Ultimate Hometown Grill Off	No
June 29	Kelly Ripa & Mark Consuelos	Yes	Josh Duhamel and Star Spangled Savings: 4 July Entertaining Week	Yes
June 30	Kelly Ripa & Anderson Cooper	Yes	Seann William Scott, Kristinia DeBarge and Star Spangled Savings: 4 July Entertaining Week	Yes

== July 2009 ==
Date	Co-Hosts	"Host Chat"	Guests/Segments	"Regis and Kelly Inbox"
July 1	Kelly Ripa & Bryant Gumbel	Yes	John Leguizamo and Star Spangled Savings: 4 July Entertaining Week	No
July 2	Kelly Ripa & Jerry O'Connell	Yes	The Real Housewives of New Jersey and Star Spangled Savings: 4 July Entertaining Week	No
July 3	Kelly Ripa & Jerry O'Connell	Yes	Brad Paisley, Neal E. Boyd and Ultimate Hometown Grill Off	No
July 6	Regis Philbin & Kelly Ripa	Yes	Jonas Brothers, Mary McCormack, Nigella Lawson and Sleep Week	No
July 7	Regis Philbin & Kelly Ripa	Yes	Serena Williams, Rainn Wilson, and Sleep Week	No
July 8	Regis Philbin & Kelly Ripa	Yes	Hayden Panettiere, 100 Year-old Tennis Champ, and Sleep Week	No
July 9	Regis Philbin & Kelly Ripa	Yes	Rupert Grint, Sugar Ray, and Sleep Week	No
July 10	Regis Philbin & Kelly Ripa	Yes	Daniel Radcliffe, Tom Cavanagh, Ultimate Hometown Grill Off, and Sleep Week	No
July 13	Regis Philbin & Kelly Ripa	Yes	Emma Watson and Celebrity Look-Alike Week	Yes
July 14	Regis Philbin & Kelly Ripa	Yes	Dylan McDermott and Celebrity Look-Alike Week	No
July 15	Regis Philbin & Kelly Ripa	Yes	David Beckham and Celebrity Look-Alike Week	No
July 16	Regis Philbin & Kelly Ripa	Yes	Adrian Grenier, Twisted Sister, and Celebrity Look-Alike Week	No
July 17	Regis Philbin & Kelly Ripa	Yes	Heidi Klum, Celebrity Look-Alike Week, and Ultimate Hometown Grill Off	No
July 20	Regis Philbin & Kelly Ripa	Yes	Alanis Morissette, New York Yankees, and Date Night Makeover Week	No
July 21	Regis Philbin & Kelly Ripa	Yes	Katherine Heigl, Jordin Sparks and Date Night Makeover Week	No
July 22	Regis Philbin & Kelly Ripa	Yes	Anna Paquin and Date Night Makeover Week	Yes
July 23	Regis Philbin & Kelly Ripa	Yes	Kevin Nealon, Flo Rida and Date Night Makeover Week	No
July 24	Regis Philbin & Kelly Ripa	Yes	Gerard Butler, Ultimate Hometown Grill Off, and Date Night Makeover Week	No
July 27	Regis Philbin & Kelly Ripa	Yes	Holly Hunter and Top Dog Week	No
July 28	Regis Philbin & Kelly Ripa	Yes	Jonah Hill and Top Dog Week	No
July 29	Kelly Ripa & Anderson Cooper	Yes	Jillian Harris and Top Dog Week	No
July 30	Kelly Ripa & Anderson Cooper	Yes	Amy Adams, Leslie Mann, and Top Dog Week	No
July 31	Kelly Ripa & Bette Midler	Yes	Adam Sandler, Top Dog Week and Ultimate Hometown Grill Off	No

== August 2009 ==
Date	Co-Hosts	"Host Chat"	Guests/Segments	"Regis and Kelly Inbox"
August 3	Kelly Ripa & Louis Aguirre	Yes	Sienna Miller, and Joan Rivers	No
August 4	Kelly Ripa & Pat Tomasulo	Yes	Vanessa Hudgens	No
August 5	Kelly Ripa & Chris Parente	Yes	Steve Zahn and Channing Tatum	Yes
August 6	Kelly Ripa & Jason Colthorp	Yes	Jeremy Piven	Yes
August 7	Kelly Ripa & Jeff Varner	Yes	David Cook, Susan Lucci, and Ultimate Hometown Grill Off	No
August 10	Kelly Ripa & Ashton Kutcher	Yes	Lisa Kudrow and So You Think You Can Dance	No
August 11	Regis Philbin & Kelly Ripa	Yes	Jesse L. Martin and Anne Heche	Yes
August 12	Regis Philbin & Kelly Ripa	Yes	Rachel McAdams, Karina Smirnoff & Maksim Chmerkovskiy, and David Cassidy	No
August 13	Regis Philbin & Kelly Ripa	Yes	Jon Hamm and Kate Gosselin	Yes
August 14	Regis Philbin & Kelly Ripa	Yes	Stanley Tucci, Candy Spelling, and Ultimate Hometown Grill Off	No
August 17	Regis Philbin & Lucy Bustamante	Yes	Carrie Ann Inaba, Diane Kruger, and Jordin Sparks	Yes
August 18	Regis Philbin & Janelle Wang	Yes	James Spader and School Lunch Makeovers	Yes
August 19	Regis Philbin & Sandra Shaw	Yes	Tim Gunn and Skin Myths: True or False	Yes
August 20	Regis Philbin & Tram Mai	Yes	Edie Falco, and Trinny Woodall & Susannah Constantine	Yes
August 21	Regis Philbin & Tamara Taggart	Yes	Renée Zellweger, Geraldo Rivera, and Ultimate Hometown Grill Off	No

== See also ==
- Live with Regis and Kelly (season 18)
- Live with Regis and Kelly (season 19)
- Live with Regis and Kelly (season 20)
- Live with Regis and Kelly (season 22)
