= Live with Regis and Kelly season 19 =

Yes	denotes that a particular segment WAS aired.
No	denotes that a particular segment WAS NOT aired.
- denotes a "Special Week" (usually a week in which the show is taken on location)
- denotes a "Special Episode"
- denotes a "Theme Week"

This is a list of Live with Regis and Kelly episodes which were broadcast during the show's 19th season. The list is ordered by air date.

Although the co-hosts may have read a couple of emails during the broadcast, it does not necessarily count as a "Regis and Kelly Inbox" segment.

== September 2006 ==
Date	Co-Hosts	"Host Chat"	Guests/Segments
September 4	Regis Philbin & Kelly Ripa	Yes	Michael Bolton, Cheetah Girls, Dikembe Mutombo
September 5	Regis Philbin & Kelly Ripa	Yes	Julianne Moore, Brad Garrett, KT Tunstall
September 6	Regis Philbin & Kelly Ripa	Yes	David Duchovny, Daniel Powter, Mary Hart
September 7	Regis Philbin & Kelly Ripa	Yes	Alan Alda, Rachel Bilson
September 8	Regis Philbin & Kelly Ripa	Yes	Tommy Lee, David Boreanaz, John O'Hurley
September 12	Regis Philbin & Kelly Ripa	Yes	Zach Braff, Toby Keith, Guinness World Record Breaker Week
September 13	Regis Philbin & Kelly Ripa	Yes	Ashton Kutcher, Barenaked Ladies, Guinness World Record Breaker Week
September 14	Regis Philbin & Kelly Ripa	Yes	Dwayne Johnson, Guinness World Record Breaker Week
September 15	Kelly Ripa & Wilmer Valderrama	Yes	Usher, Guinness World Record Breaker Week
September 18	Regis Philbin & Kelly Ripa	Yes	Ben Affleck, Howie Mandel
September 19	Regis Philbin & Kelly Ripa	Yes	Martin Short, Jesse McCartney, James Franco, Rusty Wallace
September 20	Regis Philbin & Kelly Ripa	Yes	Patrick Dempsey, Kenny Chesney, Caroline Rhea
September 21	Regis Philbin & Kelly Ripa	Yes	Jason Lee, Claudia Cohen
September 22	Regis Philbin & Kelly Ripa	No	LIVE's 2006 Relly Awards
September 25	Regis Philbin & Kelly Ripa	Yes	Marcia Cross, Nelly Furtado
September 26	Regis Philbin & Kelly Ripa	Yes	Ted Danson, Chris Noth, Ludacris
September 27	Regis Philbin & Kelly Ripa	Yes	Billy Bob Thornton, Barney the purple dinosaur
September 28	Regis Philbin & Kelly Ripa	Yes	John Stamos, Vanessa Hudgens, Marg Helgenberger
September 29	Kelly Ripa & Jesse L. Martin	Yes	Nick Carter, Aaron Carter, Carrot Top

== October 2006 ==
Date	Co-Hosts	"Host Chat"	Guests/Segments
October 2	Regis Philbin & Kelly Ripa	Yes	Emily Procter, Lorenzo Borghese, Monica
October 3	Regis Philbin & Kelly Ripa	Yes	Mark Wahlberg, Dominic Monaghan, Top of the Year awards
October 4	Regis Philbin & Kelly Ripa	Yes	Kate Winslet, Alex Trebek
October 5	Regis Philbin & Kelly Ripa	Yes	Jo Frost, Jerome Bettis, ophthalmologist Dr. Sandra Belmont
October 6	Regis Philbin & Kelly Ripa	Yes	Amber Tamblyn, Emeril Lagasse
October 9	Regis Philbin & Joy Philbin	Yes	Donald Trump, John Cena, James Blunt
October 10	Regis Philbin & Kelly Ripa	Yes	Robin Williams, Robert Randolph and the Family Band
October 11	Regis Philbin & Kelly Ripa	Yes	Dana Delany, Sarah Michelle Gellar
October 12	Regis Philbin & Kelly Ripa	Yes	Christopher Walken, Forest Whitaker, Teddy Geiger
October 13	Kelly Ripa & Sam Champion	Yes	Jane Krakowski, Frankie J
October 16	Regis Philbin & Kelly Ripa	Yes	Ryan Phillippe
October 17	Regis Philbin & Kelly Ripa	Yes	Kirsten Dunst, Ice-T
October 18	Regis Philbin & Kelly Ripa	Yes	Tina Fey, JoJo
October 19	Regis Philbin & Kelly Ripa	Yes	Hugh Jackman, Danity Kane, Regis plays tennis with an 86-year-old opponent
October 20	Kelly Ripa & Tim Gunn	Yes	Michael Caine, Tim McGraw
October 23	Regis Philbin & Kelly Ripa	Yes	Annette Bening, Peter Falk
October 24	Regis Philbin & Kelly Ripa	Yes	Sharon Osbourne, Paula Deen, Miley Cyrus
October 25	Regis Philbin & Kelly Ripa	Yes	Sarah Jessica Parker, last-minute Halloween costumes
October 26	Regis Philbin & Kelly Ripa	Yes	James Belushi, The Wiggles
October 27	Kelly Ripa & Mark Consuelos	Yes	Shannen Doherty, Molly Sims, Halloween party ideas
October 30	Regis Philbin & Kelly Ripa	Yes	Adrian Pasdar, Nigella Lawson, Claudia Cohen
October 31	Regis Philbin & Kelly Ripa	Yes	LIVE's Halloween Spectacular, Judy Sheindlin, Bowling for Soup

== November 2006 ==
Date	Co-Hosts	"Host Chat"	Guests/Segments
November 1	Regis Philbin & Kelly Ripa	Yes	Tim Allen, Jerry Springer
November 2	Regis Philbin & Kelly Ripa	Yes	Denzel Washington, Jeff Gordon, Adewale Akinnuoye-Agbaje
November 3	Regis Philbin & Kelly Ripa	Yes	Madonna, Chevy Chase, Gretchen Wilson
November 6	Regis Philbin & Kelly Ripa	Yes	Sacha Baron Cohen, Sting
November 7	Regis Philbin & Kelly Ripa	Yes	Russell Crowe
November 8	Regis Philbin & Kelly Ripa	Yes	Will Ferrell, David James Elliott, a preview of Regis' appearance on "Jeopardy!"
November 9	Regis Philbin & Kelly Ripa	Yes	Dustin Hoffman, John O'Hurley, Kelly takes a turn as a weather forecaster
November 10	Regis Philbin & Kelly Ripa	Yes	Josh Groban, Howie Mandel, John Leguizamo
November 13	Regis Philbin & Kelly Ripa	Yes	Julia Louis-Dreyfus, Christian Slater, Thanks-for-Giving Dream Team Ambush Makeover Week
November 14	Regis Philbin & Kelly Ripa	Yes	Emilio Estevez, Terrell Owens, Thanks-for-Giving Dream Team Ambush Makeover Week
November 15	Regis Philbin & Kelly Ripa	Yes	Penélope Cruz, Taye Diggs, Thanks-for-Giving Dream Team Ambush Makeover Week
November 16	Regis Philbin & Kelly Ripa	Yes	Julianne Moore, Daniel Craig, Thanks-for-Giving Dream Team Ambush Makeover Week
November 17	Kelly Ripa & Clay Aiken	Yes	Dancing with the Stars winners, Thanks-for-Giving Dream Team Ambush Makeover Week
November 20	Regis Philbin & Kelly Ripa	Yes	Val Kilmer, Noah Wyle
November 21	Regis Philbin & Kelly Ripa	Yes	Morgan Freeman, Rachel Weisz, crafts for kids
November 22	Regis Philbin & Kelly Ripa	Yes	Kristin Davis, Chris Daughtry, Regis gets a flu shot
November 24	Regis Philbin & Kelly Ripa	Yes	Wilmer Valderrama, Jimmie Johnson, Ricky Martin
November 27	Regis Philbin & Kelly Ripa	Yes	Kyle Chandler, Lucy Liu
November 28	Regis Philbin & Kelly Ripa	Yes	Jude Law, Prince Lorenzo Borghese
November 29	Regis Philbin & Kelly Ripa	Yes	Dan Rather, Carson Kressley
November 30	Regis Philbin & Kelly Ripa	Yes	Eva LaRue, Drake Bell

== December 2006 ==
Date	Co-Hosts	"Host Chat"	Guests/Segments
December 4	Regis Philbin & Kelly Ripa	Yes	Dakota Fanning, Derek Jeter, Sarah McLachlan
December 5	Regis Philbin & Kelly Ripa	Yes	Cate Blanchett, Ciara
December 6	Regis Philbin & Kelly Ripa	Yes	Shawn Wayans, Taylor Hicks
December 7	Regis Philbin & Kelly Ripa	Yes	Rob Lowe, America's Next Top Model
December 8	Kelly Ripa & Anderson Cooper	Yes	Jennifer Connelly, Kermit the Frog, Brian McKnight
December 11	Regis Philbin & Kelly Ripa	Yes	Matthew Fox, Fantasia Barrino, winners of The Amazing Race
December 12	Regis Philbin & Kelly Ripa	Yes	Matthew McConaughey, Trans-Siberian Orchestra
December 13	Regis Philbin & Kelly Ripa	Yes	George Clooney, Susan Lucci
December 14	Regis Philbin & Kelly Ripa	Yes	Naomi Watts, 50 Cent, Aimee Mann
December 15	Regis Philbin & Kelly Ripa	Yes	Will Smith, Clay Aiken
December 18	Regis Philbin & Kelly Ripa	Yes	Sylvester Stallone, Chris Brown & Bow Wow
December 19	Regis Philbin & Kelly Ripa	Yes	Ben Stiller, Survivor: Cook Islands winner
December 20	Regis Philbin & Kelly Ripa	Yes	Beyoncé Knowles, Cameron Mathison
December 21	Regis Philbin & Kelly Ripa	Yes	Jamie Foxx, Clive Owen
December 22	Regis Philbin & Kelly Ripa	Yes	LIVE's Holiday Celebration, Robert De Niro, Ashanti, Disney on Ice

== January 2007 ==
Date	Co-Hosts	"Host Chat"	Guests/Segments
January 8	Regis Philbin & Kelly Ripa	Yes	Donald Trump, Bill O'Reilly
January 9	Regis Philbin & Kelly Ripa	Yes	Patricia Heaton, Corbin Bleu, Allen Carr
January 10	Regis Philbin & Kelly Ripa	Yes	Renée Zellweger, Joan & Melissa Rivers, Andrew Weil
January 11	Regis Philbin & Kelly Ripa	Yes	America Ferrera, Madonna, Dr. Robi Ludwig
January 12	Regis Philbin & Kelly Ripa	Yes	Kiefer Sutherland, Jill Hennessy
January 15	Regis Philbin & Kelly Ripa	Yes	Paula Abdul, Jimmy Fallon
January 16	Regis Philbin & Kelly Ripa	Yes	Diana Ross, Rupert Everett, Jamie Oliver
January 17	Regis Philbin & Kelly Ripa	Yes	Sophia Bush, Jerry Rice
January 18	Regis Philbin & Kelly Ripa	Yes	Tony Danza, Tony Shalhoub, Todd English
January 19	Kelly Ripa & Emeril Lagasse	Yes	Ali Larter
January 22	Regis Philbin & Kelly Ripa	Yes	Carmen Electra, Robert Knepper
January 23	Regis Philbin & Kelly Ripa	Yes	Jeremy Piven, Paul, Sr., Paul, Jr. & Michael Teutul
January 24	Regis Philbin & Kelly Ripa	Yes	Jennifer Garner, Ryan Reynolds
January 25	Regis Philbin & Kelly Ripa	Yes	Edward Norton
January 26	Kelly Ripa & Mark Consuelos	Yes	Julianne Moore, Mandy Moore
January 29	Regis Philbin & Kelly Ripa	Yes	Sheryl Crow
January 30	Regis Philbin & Kelly Ripa	Yes	Brad Garrett, Guy Pearce
January 31	Kelly Ripa & Pat Sajak	Yes	Dylan McDermott, Miss America 2007

== February 2007 ==
Date	Co-Hosts	"Host Chat"	Guests/Segments
February 1	Regis Philbin & Kelly Ripa	Yes	Sienna Miller, Katharine McPhee
February 2	Regis Philbin & Kelly Ripa	Yes	Jeff Probst, Charlize Theron
February 5	Regis Philbin & Kelly Ripa	Yes	Chad Lowe
February 6	Regis Philbin & Kelly Ripa	Yes	Phil McGraw, Alex Rodriguez
February 7	Regis Philbin & Kelly Ripa	Yes	Ashley Tisdale
February 8	Regis Philbin & Kelly Ripa	Yes	Tyler Perry, Carly Simon
February 9	Regis Philbin & Kelly Ripa	No	LIVE's Wedding 2007
February 12	Regis Philbin & Kelly Ripa	Yes	Hugh Grant, Hayden Panettiere
February 13	Regis Philbin & Kelly Ripa	Yes	Drew Barrymore, Ruth Westheimer
February 14	Regis Philbin & Kelly Ripa	Yes	Nicolas Cage, Katherine Heigl, a hidden-camera report from a lingerie store, last-minute Valentine's Day gifts
February 15	Regis Philbin & Kelly Ripa	Yes	Eva Mendes, Hi-5, Regis talks to youngsters about love
February 16	Regis Philbin & Kelly Ripa	Yes	Martin Lawrence, Gabrielle Union, Daniel G. Amen
February 19	Regis Philbin & Kelly Ripa	Yes	Marisa Tomei, bubble scientist Fan Yang, Beautiful Baby Week
February 20	Regis Philbin & Kelly Ripa	Yes	Heather Graham, Daytona 500 winner, Beautiful Baby Week
February 21	Regis Philbin & Kelly Ripa	Yes	William H. Macy, Beautiful Baby Week
February 22	Regis Philbin & Kelly Ripa	Yes	John Travolta, Richard Roeper, Beautiful Baby Week
February 23	Regis Philbin & Kelly Ripa	Yes	Billy Bob Thornton, Jesse L. Martin, Geraldo Rivera, Chris Byrne the Toy Guy, Beautiful Baby Week
February 26	Regis Philbin & Kelly Ripa	Yes	LIVE! in Los Angeles, Tim Allen, Masi Oka, Joan & Melissa Rivers' Oscar recap
February 27	Regis Philbin & Kelly Ripa	Yes	LIVE! in Los Angeles, Courteney Cox, David Boreanaz, Five for Fighting, Regis visits some of his favorite places in L.A.
February 28	Regis Philbin & Kelly Ripa	Yes	LIVE! in Los Angeles, Emily Procter, Ryan Seacrest, Regis visits the set of Deal or No Deal

== March 2007 ==
Date	Co-Hosts	"Host Chat"	Guests/Segments
March 1	Regis Philbin & Kelly Ripa	Yes	LIVE! in Los Angeles, James Denton, Jewel, Kelly meets the cast of Dancing with the Stars
March 2	Regis Philbin & Kelly Ripa	Yes	LIVE! in Los Angeles, Robert Downey, Jr., Paula DeAnda, Anastasia the balloon-popping dog
March 5	Regis Philbin & Kelly Ripa	Yes	Kelsey Grammer, Kyle MacLachlan
March 6	Regis Philbin & Kelly Ripa	Yes	Liev Schreiber, Tracee Ellis Ross, animal expert Peter Gros
March 7	Regis Philbin & Kelly Ripa	Yes	John Walsh, Oliver Hudson
March 8	Regis Philbin & Kelly Ripa	Yes	Julia Louis-Dreyfus
March 9	Kelly Ripa & Mark Consuelos	Yes	Mayumana perform excerpts from their off-Broadway show "Be".
March 12	Regis Philbin & Kelly Ripa	Yes	James Belushi, Amazing Race castoffs
March 13	Kelly Ripa & Anderson Cooper	Yes	Chris Rock, Robin Thicke
March 14	Kelly Ripa & Anderson Cooper	Yes	Andy Richter, Mark Wahlberg
March 15	Kelly Ripa & Damien Fahey	Yes	Sandra Bullock, Jeff Goldblum
March 16	Kelly Ripa & Damien Fahey	Yes	Robin Miller
March 19	Kelly Ripa & Howie Mandel	Yes	Christopher Meloni, Rainn Wilson, 12th American Idol Finalist
March 20	Kelly Ripa & Howie Mandel	Yes	Kirk Douglas, Bernie Mac, Elliott Yamin
March 21	Kelly Ripa & Howie Mandel	Yes	Adam Sandler, Terrence Howard, Bucky Covington
March 22	Kelly Ripa & Neil Patrick Harris	Yes	Jada Pinkett Smith, Bridget Moynahan, Josh Gracin
March 23	Kelly Ripa & Neil Patrick Harris	Yes	Liv Tyler, Poppy Montgomery, 11th American Idol Finalist

== April 2007 ==
Date	Co-Hosts	"Host Chat"	Guests/Segments
April 9	Kelly Ripa & Martin Short	Yes	Shia LaBeouf, 9th American Idol Finalist, New York Auto Show Week
April 10	Kelly Ripa & Pat Sajak	Yes	Halle Berry, Robin Roberts, Zach Johnson, New York Auto Show Week
April 11	Kelly Ripa & Pat Sajak	Yes	David Duchovny, Tina Fey, New York Auto Show Week
April 12	Kelly Ripa & Pat Sajak	Yes	Edie Falco, New York Auto Show Week
April 13	Kelly Ripa & Pat Sajak	Yes	Kevin Spacey, Andrew Zimmern, New York Auto Show Week
April 16	Kelly Ripa & Mark Consuelos	Yes	Julie Andrews, 8th American Idol Finalist, Green Week
April 17	Kelly Ripa & Jeff Probst	Yes	Sigourney Weaver, Mims, Green Week
April 18	Kelly Ripa & Jeff Probst	Yes	Avril Lavigne, Diane Sawyer, Green Week
April 19	Kelly Ripa & Jeff Probst	Yes	Jane Krakowski, Adam Brody, Green Week
April 20	Kelly Ripa & Donald Trump	Yes	Garry Shandling, Taylor Hicks, Green Week
April 23	Kelly Ripa & Bryant Gumbel	Yes	Julianne Moore, 7th American Idol Finalist
April 24	Kelly Ripa & Bryant Gumbel	Yes	Julia Stiles, winner of The Apprentice
April 25	Kelly Ripa & Bryant Gumbel	Yes	Russell Simmons, Carla Gugino
April 26	Regis Philbin & Kelly Ripa	Yes	David Letterman
April 27	Regis Philbin & Kelly Ripa	Yes	Steve Austin
April 30	Regis Philbin & Kelly Ripa	Yes	Amanda Peet, Cardiologist Arthur Agatston

== May 2007 ==
Date	Co-Hosts	"Host Chat"	Guests/Segments
May 1	Regis Philbin & Kelly Ripa	Yes	Tobey Maguire, Carmen Electra, Ne-Yo
May 2	Regis Philbin & Kelly Ripa	Yes	Kirsten Dunst, Mehmet Oz
May 3	Regis Philbin & Kelly Ripa	Yes	Kate Walsh, Eric Bana
May 4	Regis Philbin & Kelly Ripa	Yes	Tori Amos, Drew Barrymore, a CPR lesson
May 7	Regis Philbin & Kelly Ripa	Yes	Zach Braff, Howie Mandel, 6th American Idol Finalist, 5th American Idol Finalist
May 8	Regis Philbin & Kelly Ripa	Yes	Felicity Huffman, The Amazing Race winners, Joy Philbin
May 9	Regis Philbin & Kelly Ripa	Yes	Jane Fonda, Kelly Clarkson
May 10	Regis Philbin & Kelly Ripa	Yes	Freddie Prinze, Jr., Larry the Cable Guy
May 11	Regis Philbin & Kelly Ripa	No	LIVE's Mom's Dream Come True Special
May 14	Regis Philbin & Kelly Ripa	Yes	Survivor: Fiji winner, 4th American Idol Finalist
May 15	Regis Philbin & Kelly Ripa	Yes	Eric Dane, Milo Ventimiglia
May 16	Regis Philbin & Kelly Ripa	Yes	Don Rickles, Rebecca Romijn
May 17	Regis Philbin & Kelly Ripa	Yes	America Ferrera, Mike Myers
May 18	Regis Philbin & Kelly Ripa	Yes	Nicollette Sheridan, Tom Selleck, Jimmy Kimmel
May 21	Regis Philbin & Kelly Ripa	Yes	Evangeline Lilly, Sendhil Ramamurthy, Gretchen Wilson
May 22	Regis Philbin & Kelly Ripa	Yes	LIVE! in New Orleans, Emeril Lagasse, Pete Fountain, Kyle Busch
May 23	Regis Philbin & Kelly Ripa	Yes	LIVE! in New Orleans, John Stamos, Tenney Flynn, Preservation Hall Jazz Band
May 24	Regis Philbin & Kelly Ripa	Yes	LIVE! in New Orleans, Martina McBride, America's Next Top Model, Paul Prudhomme, Dirty Dozen Brass Band
May 25	Regis Philbin & Kelly Ripa	Yes	LIVE! in New Orleans, Luke Wilson, Cowboy Mouth, Leah Chase, Rockin' Dopsie
May 28	Regis Philbin & Kelly Ripa	Yes	Joey Lawrence, Brenda Song, Swimwear
May 29	Regis Philbin & Kelly Ripa	Yes	Kevin Costner, American Idol winner, Indianapolis 500 winner
May 30	Regis Philbin & Kelly Ripa	Yes	Charles Gibson, American Idol runner-up, the winner of the MathCounts competition for middle-school students
May 31	Regis Philbin & Kelly Ripa	Yes	Elisabeth Shue, American Idol third-place finisher, animal expert Peter Gros

== June 2007 ==
Date	Co-Hosts	"Host Chat"	Guests/Segments
June 1	Regis Philbin & Kelly Ripa	Yes	Fantasia Barrino, Becki Newton
June 4	Kelly Ripa & Bryant Gumbel	Yes	Tyler Perry, Miss Universe 2007, Broadway Week
June 5	Kelly Ripa & Bryant Gumbel	Yes	Marg Helgenberger, Jerry Springer, Broadway Week
June 6	Kelly Ripa & Ted McGinley	Yes	Jessica Alba, Bindi Irwin, Broadway Week
June 7	Kelly Ripa & Neil Patrick Harris	Yes	Jimmie Johnson, Broadway Week
June 8	Kelly Ripa & Neil Patrick Harris	Yes	Nicole Richie, Broadway Week, Grill Friday
June 11	Regis Philbin & Mario Lopez	Yes	Bill Paxton, Matt Dallas, Top Dog Week
June 12	Regis Philbin & Kelly Ripa	Yes	Kevin Connolly, Vanessa L. Williams, Top Dog Week
June 13	Regis Philbin & Kelly Ripa	Yes	Kyra Sedgwick, Emma Roberts, Top Dog Week
June 14	Regis Philbin & Kelly Ripa	Yes	Michael Chiklis, Joan Rivers, Top Dog Week
June 15	Regis Philbin & Kelly Ripa	Yes	Jeremy Piven, Joss Stone, Top Dog Week, Grill Friday
June 18	Kelly Ripa & Mark Consuelos	Yes	Enrique Iglesias, Tyrese Gibson
June 19	Regis Philbin & Kelly Ripa	Yes	Steve Carell, Mandy Moore
June 20	Regis Philbin & Kelly Ripa	Yes	John Cusack, Jeanne Tripplehorn, DJ JS-1
June 21	Regis Philbin & Kelly Ripa	Yes	Elisha Cuthbert, Lisa Rinna & Harry Hamlin, Drake Bell
June 22	Regis Philbin & Kelly Ripa	Yes	Téa Leoni, John Krasinski, Grill Friday

== July 2007 ==
Date	Co-Hosts	"Host Chat"	Guests/Segments
July 2	Regis Philbin & Kelly Ripa	Yes	Claire Danes, Jerry Mathers, Shaquille O'Neal
July 3	Regis Philbin & Kelly Ripa	Yes	Josh Duhamel, Anneliese van der Pol
July 4	Regis Philbin & Kelly Ripa	Yes	Aly and AJ, Petra Němcová, Jim Cramer
July 5	Regis Philbin & Kelly Ripa	Yes	Kevin Dillon, Connie Britton, Lloyd
July 6	Regis Philbin & Kelly Ripa	Yes	Miley Cyrus, Pamela Anderson & Hans Klok, DJ JS-1, Grill Friday
July 9	Regis Philbin & Kelly Ripa	Yes	Jason Priestley, Alan Cumming, Jeff Gordon, Kat DeLuna
July 10	Regis Philbin & Kelly Ripa	Yes	Don Cheadle, Bernadette Peters, James Blake
July 11	Regis Philbin & Kelly Ripa	Yes	Daniel Radcliffe, Sienna Miller, T-Pain
July 12	Regis Philbin & Kelly Ripa	Yes	Emma Watson, Finola Hughes, Maroon 5
July 13	Regis Philbin & Kelly Ripa	Yes	Abigail Breslin, Joey Fatone, Grill Friday
July 16	Regis Philbin & Kelly Ripa	Yes	Queen Latifah, Blair Underwood, Family Fitness Week
July 17	Regis Philbin & Kelly Ripa	Yes	John Travolta, Family Fitness Week
July 18	Regis Philbin & Kelly Ripa	Yes	Adam Sandler, Zac Efron, Family Fitness Week
July 19	Regis Philbin & Kelly Ripa	Yes	Jessica Biel, Hi-5, Family Fitness Week
July 20	Regis Philbin & Kelly Ripa	Yes	Kevin James, Family Fitness Week, Grill Friday
July 23	Regis Philbin & Kelly Ripa	Yes	Scott Baio, Lifehouse
July 24	Regis Philbin & Kelly Ripa	Yes	Christopher Walken, Kellie Pickler, Jennifer Hudson
July 25	Regis Philbin & Kelly Ripa	Yes	Katharine McPhee, Aaron Eckhart
July 26	Regis Philbin & Kelly Ripa	Yes	Jennifer Lopez, Nikki Blonsky
July 27	Regis Philbin & Kelly Ripa	Yes	Catherine Zeta-Jones, Paul Rudd, Grill Friday
July 30	Regis Philbin & Kelly Ripa	Yes	James Belushi, Michael Bublé, Sharon Osbourne
July 31	Regis Philbin & Kelly Ripa	Yes	John Leguizamo, Catherine Bell, Rev. Joseph Orsini

== August 2007 ==
Date	Co-Hosts	"Host Chat"	Guests/Segments
August 1	Regis Philbin & Kelly Ripa	Yes	Anne Hathaway, Seth Rogen, Plain White T's
August 2	Regis Philbin & Kelly Ripa	Yes	Chris O'Donnell, Clint Black, Ashley Tisdale
August 3	Regis Philbin & Kelly Ripa	Yes	Jackie Chan, Andy Samberg, Grill Friday
August 6	Kelly Ripa & Carson Kressley	Yes	Chris Tucker, Steve Buscemi, Guinness World Record Breaker Week
August 7	Regis Philbin & Kelly Ripa	Yes	Tori Spelling, Drew Carey, Guinness World Record Breaker Week
August 8	Regis Philbin & Kelly Ripa	Yes	Michelle Pfeiffer, Guinness World Record Breaker Week
August 9	Regis Philbin & Kelly Ripa	Yes	Cuba Gooding, Jr., Guinness World Record Breaker Week
August 10	Regis Philbin & Kelly Ripa	Yes	Lance Bass, Guinness World Record Breaker Week, Grill Friday
August 13	Kelly Ripa & Enrique Iglesias	Yes	Lauren Conrad, Nick Cannon
August 14	Regis Philbin & Kelly Ripa	Yes	Tony Shalhoub, Brad Paisley, Laura Linney
August 15	Regis Philbin & Kelly Ripa	Yes	Aisha Tyler, Def Leppard
August 16	Regis Philbin & Joy Philbin	Yes	Vanessa Hudgens, Denis Leary, Good Charlotte
August 17	Regis Philbin & Joy Philbin	Yes	Star Jones, Grill Friday

== See also ==
- Live with Regis and Kelly (season 18)
- Live with Regis and Kelly (season 20)
- Live with Regis and Kelly (season 21)
- Live with Regis and Kelly (season 22)
