= Live with Regis and Kelly season 22 =

Yes	denotes that a particular segment WAS aired.
No	denotes that a particular segment WAS NOT aired.
- denotes a "Special Week" (usually a week in which the show is taken on location)
- denotes a "Special Episode"
- denotes a "Theme Week"

This is a list of Live with Regis and Kelly episodes which were broadcast during the show's 22nd season. The list is ordered by air date.

Although the co-hosts may have read a couple of emails during the broadcast, it does not necessarily count as a "Regis and Kelly Inbox" segment.

== September 2009 ==
Date	Co-Hosts	"Host Chat"	Guests/Segments	"Regis and Kelly Inbox"
September 7	Regis Philbin & Kelly Ripa	Yes	Stephen Moyer, Jerry Ferrara, and Rachel Zoe	No
September 8	Regis Philbin & Kelly Ripa	Yes	Queen Latifah and AnnaLynne McCord	Yes
September 9	Regis Philbin & Kelly Ripa	Yes	Tyler Perry and Michael Douglas	No
September 10	Regis Philbin & Kelly Ripa	Yes	Jason Bateman, Amber Tamblyn, and Smokey Robinson	Yes
September 14	Regis Philbin & Kelly Ripa	Yes	Chace Crawford, Michael Strahan, Kim Clijsters, and Guinness World Record Breaker Week	No
September 15	Regis Philbin & Kelly Ripa	Yes	Aaron Eckhart, Laura Leighton, and Guinness World Record Breaker Week	No
September 16	Regis Philbin & Kelly Ripa	Yes	Megan Fox, Serena Williams, and Guinness World Record Breaker Week	Yes
September 17	Regis Philbin & Kelly Ripa	Yes	Dennis Quaid, 2009 NASCAR Sprint Cup Series, and Guinness World Record Breaker Week	No
September 18	Kelly Ripa & David Duchovny	Yes	America's Got Talent winner Kevin Skinner, Ricky Gervais, and Guinness World Record Breaker Week	No
September 21	Regis Philbin & Kelly Ripa	Yes	Julianna Margulies and David Gray	Yes
September 22	Regis Philbin & Kelly Ripa	Yes	Christian Slater and LL Cool J	Yes
September 23	Regis Philbin & Kelly Ripa	Yes	Clive Owen and Melina Kanakaredes	Yes
September 24	Regis Philbin & Kelly Ripa	Yes	Laurence Fishburne and Whitney Port	Yes
September 25	Kelly Ripa & Jeff Probst	Yes	Jude Law, John Krasinski, and Jo Frost	Yes
September 28	Regis Philbin & Kelly Ripa	Yes	Eli Manning and 2009 Relly Awards	No
September 29	Regis Philbin & Kelly Ripa	Yes	Patricia Heaton and 2009 Relly Awards	No
September 30	Regis Philbin & Kelly Ripa	Yes	Kelsey Grammer and 2009 Relly Awards	No

== October 2009 ==
Date	Co-Hosts	"Host Chat"	Guests/Segments	"Regis and Kelly Inbox"
October 1	Regis Philbin & Kelly Ripa	Yes	Woody Harrelson and 2009 Relly Awards	No
October 2	Kelly Ripa & Mark Consuelos	Yes	Selena Gomez, Disney Familyfun's 18th Annual Toy of the Years Awards, and 2009 Relly Awards	No
October 5	Regis Philbin & Kelly Ripa	Yes	Eddie Cibrian and Melissa Etheridge	Yes
October 6	Regis Philbin & Kelly Ripa	Yes	Larry David and John Stamos	No
October 7	Regis Philbin & Kelly Ripa	Yes	Chevy Chase and Julie Andrews	Yes
October 8	Regis Philbin & Kelly Ripa	Yes	Vince Vaughn and Michael Kors	No
October 9	Kelly Ripa & Anderson Cooper	Yes	Padma Lakshmi and Joss Stone	Yes
October 12	Regis Philbin & Kelly Ripa	Yes	Forest Whitaker and Alicia Keys	Yes
October 13	Regis Philbin & Kelly Ripa	Yes	Uma Thurman and Ivanka Trump	No
October 14	Regis Philbin & Kelly Ripa	Yes	Minnie Driver, Colbie Caillat, and Regis gets a flu shot	No
October 15	Regis Philbin & Kelly Ripa	Yes	Mario Lopez and Monty Python	Yes
October 16	Kelly Ripa & Anderson Cooper	Yes	Penn Badgley and Halloween Masks	No
October 19	Regis Philbin & Kelly Ripa	Yes	Hilary Swank, Memory Expert Dave Farrow, and CFA Iams Cat Championship	No
October 20	Regis Philbin & Kelly Ripa	Yes	Garry Shandling and Jane Krakowski	No
October 21	Regis Philbin & Kelly Ripa	Yes	Ewan McGregor and Jim Cramer	No
October 22	Regis Philbin & Kelly Ripa	Yes	Willem Dafoe and Tracy Morgan	No
October 23	Kelly Ripa & Kyle MacLachlan	Yes	Jason Alexander and Eugene Levy	No
October 26	Regis Philbin & Kelly Ripa	Yes	Judge Judy and Halloween Week	No
October 27	Regis Philbin & Kelly Ripa	Yes	Courteney Cox, Creed, and Halloween Week	No
October 28	Regis Philbin & Kelly Ripa	Yes	Patrick Dempsey, Brody Jenner, and Halloween Week	No
October 29	Regis Philbin & Kelly Ripa	Yes	Daniel Craig, Don Rickles, and Halloween Week	No
October 30	Regis Philbin & Kelly Ripa	Yes	LIVE's Reality Bites Halloween Spectacular, Donald Trump, and Carrie Ann Inaba	No

== November 2009 ==
Date	Co-Hosts	"Host Chat"	Guests/Segments	"Regis and Kelly Inbox"
November 2	Regis Philbin & Kelly Ripa	Yes	Jenny McCarthy and Ted Danson	Yes
November 3	Regis Philbin & Kelly Ripa	Yes	Reba McEntire and Emeril Lagasse	Yes
November 4	Regis Philbin & Kelly Ripa	Yes	Julia Louis-Dreyfus and Sean Kingston	Yes
November 5	Regis Philbin & Kelly Ripa	Yes	Bernadette Peters and Carrie Underwood	Yes
November 6	Regis Philbin & Kelly Ripa	Yes	James Marsden and Project Runway Finalists	No
November 9	Regis Philbin & Kelly Ripa	Yes	Meredith Vieira, Dana Delany, and Home for the Holiday Makeovers Week	No
November 10	Regis Philbin & Kelly Ripa	Yes	John Cusack, Robin Roberts, and Home for the Holiday Makeovers Week	No
November 11	Regis Philbin & Kelly Ripa	Yes	Andre Agassi, Martin Short, and Home for the Holiday Makeovers Week	No
November 12	Regis Philbin & Kelly Ripa	Yes	Kate Walsh and Home for the Holiday Makeovers Week	No
November 13	Regis Philbin & Kelly Ripa	Yes	Jimmy Smits, Jamie Oliver, and Home for the Holiday Makeovers Week	No
November 16	Regis Philbin & Kelly Ripa	Yes	Anderson Cooper and The Hayes Family	No
November 17	Regis Philbin & Kelly Ripa	Yes	Keanu Reeves and Heidi & Spencer Pratt	No
November 18	Regis Philbin & Kelly Ripa	Yes	Kristen Stewart and Kris Allen	Yes
November 19	Regis Philbin & Kelly Ripa	Yes	Robert Pattinson, America's Next Top Model Winner, and Thanksgiving Food with Joy	No
November 20	Regis Philbin & Kelly Ripa	Yes	Penélope Cruz, Taylor Lautner, and Kelly & Mark go back to "All My Children"	No
November 23	Regis Philbin & Kelly Ripa	Yes	LIVE! in Las Vegas, Mark Harmon, David Cook, Project Runway winner Irina Shabayeva makes Kelly a wedding dress and Kelly learns some of the acrobatic moves that make the unbelievable show La Rêve such a sensational attraction	No
November 24	Regis Philbin & Kelly Ripa	Yes	LIVE! in Las Vegas, Jimmy Kimmel, Carrot Top and Kelly relives her trip down the aisle at the popular "Chapel of the Bells"	No
November 25	Regis Philbin & Kelly Ripa	Yes	LIVE! in Las Vegas, Thomas Gibson, Regis & Joy and Kelly visits the cast of "The Beatles Love" by Cirque du Soleil	No
November 27	Regis Philbin & Kelly Ripa	Yes	LIVE! in Las Vegas, Thanksgiving Leftovers, Neil Patrick Harris, Uncle Kracker and Regis takes a special helicopter ride above the Vegas strip and stops at the breathtaking Grand Canyon	No
November 30	Regis Philbin & Kelly Ripa	Yes	Matt Dillon, Ashley Greene, Miranda Cosgrove, and Pete Yorn and Scarlett Johansson	No

== December 2009 ==
Date	Co-Hosts	"Host Chat"	Guests/Segments	"Regis and Kelly Inbox"
December 1	Kelly Ripa & Howie Mandel	Yes	Cheryl Hines	No
December 2	Kelly Ripa & Michael Bublé	Yes	Morgan Freeman and Lance Armstrong	Yes
December 3	Kelly Ripa & Anderson Cooper	Yes	Meg Ryan, Jermaine, Tito, Jackie and Marlon Jackson	Yes
December 4	Kelly Ripa & Christian Slater	Yes	Kate Beckinsale and Sting	Yes
December 7	Kelly Ripa & Bryant Gumbel	Yes	Ray Romano, John Lithgow, and Inside The Chef's Kitchen	No
December 8	Kelly Ripa & Bryant Gumbel	Yes	Julianne Hough, Terrence Howard, and Inside The Chef's Kitchen	No
December 9	Kelly Ripa & Jeff Probst	Yes	Catherine Zeta-Jones, The Biggest Loser Winner, and Inside The Chef's Kitchen	Yes
December 10	Kelly Ripa & Jeff Probst	Yes	Mariah Carey, Billy Ray Cyrus, and Inside The Chef's Kitchen	Yes
December 11	Kelly Ripa & Jeff Probst	Yes	Kate Hudson, Kerry Washington, Inside The Chef's Kitchen	Yes
December 14	Kelly Ripa & Anderson Cooper	Yes	Colin Firth and Holiday Savings Gift Guide Week	Yes
December 15	Kelly Ripa & Anderson Cooper	Yes	Fergie, Ne-Yo, and Holiday Savings Gift Guide Week	Yes
December 16	Kelly Ripa & Anderson Cooper	Yes	Hugh Grant, Judi Dench, and Holiday Savings Gift Guide Week	Yes
December 17	Kelly Ripa & Mark Consuelos	Yes	Sarah Jessica Parker and Holiday Savings Gift Guide Week	Yes
December 18	Kelly Ripa & Mark Consuelos	Yes	Robert Downey, Jr. and Holiday Savings Gift Guide Week	Yes
December 21	Kelly Ripa & Mark Consuelos	Yes	Jude Law, Sting, Disney on Ice, Perfect Tree	Yes
December 22	Kelly Ripa & Mark Consuelos	Yes	LIVE's Holiday Celebration, Nicole Kidman, David Archuleta, The Rockettes and Tavern on the Green	No

== January 2010 ==
Date	Co-Hosts	"Host Chat"	Guests/Segments	"Regis and Kelly Inbox"
January 4	Regis Philbin & Kelly Ripa	Yes	Chris Meloni, Jake Pavelka, and New Year, New You: Guide to Better Eating Week	No
January 5	Regis Philbin & Kelly Ripa	Yes	Jenna Elfman, Chesley Sullenberger, and New Year, New You: Guide to Better Eating Week	No
January 6	Regis Philbin & Kelly Ripa	Yes	Tim Allen, Katharine McPhee, and New Year, New You: Guide to Better Eating Week	Yes
January 7	Regis Philbin & Kelly Ripa	Yes	Amy Adams, Gabourey Sidibe, and New Year, New You: Guide to Better Eating Week	No
January 8	Kelly Ripa & Nick Jonas	Yes	Zach Braff, Marion Cotillard, and New Year, New You: Guide to Better Eating Week	Yes
January 11	Regis Philbin & Kelly Ripa	Yes	Valerie Bertinelli and Nathan Fillion	Yes
January 12	Regis Philbin & Kelly Ripa	Yes	Jennifer Connelly	Yes
January 13	Regis Philbin & Kelly Ripa	Yes	Freddie Prinze, Jr. and Tim Gunn	Yes
January 14	Regis Philbin & Kelly Ripa	Yes	Kiefer Sutherland and Norah Jones	No
January 15	Kelly Ripa & Mark Consuelos	Yes	Denzel Washington, Matt Bomer, and Fitness Friday	No
January 18	Regis Philbin & Kelly Ripa	Yes	Jeff Bridges, Ian Somerhalder, Carrie Underwood and Peter Gros	No
January 19	Regis Philbin & Kelly Ripa	Yes	Randy Jackson and Ashley Judd	Yes
January 20	Regis Philbin & Kelly Ripa	Yes	Dwayne Johnson and Becki Newton	Yes
January 21	Regis Philbin & Kelly Ripa	Yes	Brendan Fraser, Masi Oka, and Richard "Ack Ack" Ackerman	Yes
January 22	Kelly Ripa & Jerry O'Connell	Yes	Harrison Ford, Lucy Lawless, and Fitness Friday	Yes
January 25	Kelly Ripa & Mark Consuelos	Yes	Glenn Close and Tracey Ullman	Yes
January 26	Kelly Ripa & Martin Short	Yes	Josh Duhamel and Home Remedies	Yes
January 27	Kelly Ripa & David Duchovny	Yes	Claire Danes	Yes
January 28	Kelly Ripa & Jeff Probst	Yes	Julianne Moore and Nick Thompson	No
January 29	Kelly Ripa & Mark Consuelos	Yes	Kristen Bell, Christine Baranski, Project Ack Ack, and Fitness Friday	No

== February 2010 ==
Date	Co-Hosts	"Host Chat"	Guests/Segments	"Regis and Kelly Inbox"
February 1	Regis Philbin & Kelly Ripa	Yes	Jonathan Rhys Meyers	Yes
February 2	Regis Philbin & Kelly Ripa	Yes	Jesse Tyler Ferguson and Vanessa Williams	Yes
February 3	Regis Philbin & Kelly Ripa	Yes	Jessica Alba and Channing Tatum	No
February 4	Regis Philbin & Kelly Ripa	Yes	Michael Strahan, John Travolta, and Project Ack Ack	Yes
February 5	Regis Philbin & Kelly Ripa	Yes	Robin Thicke, Pierce Brosnan, Project Ack Ack, and Fitness Friday	Yes
February 8	Regis Philbin & Kelly Ripa	Yes	Bill Paxton, Project Ack Ack, and Inside the Chef's Kitchen - Chocolate Challenge	No
February 9	Regis Philbin & Kelly Ripa	Yes	Rosario Dawson, Project Ack Ack, and Inside the Chef's Kitchen - Chocolate Challenge	No
February 10	Regis Philbin & Kelly Ripa	Yes	Jennifer Garner, Ruby Gettinger, Project Ack Ack and Inside the Chef's Kitchen - Chocolate Challenge	No
February 11	Regis Philbin & Kelly Ripa	Yes	Kim Kardashian and Inside the Chef's Kitchen - Chocolate Challenge	No
February 12	Regis Philbin & Kelly Ripa	Yes	Jessica Biel, Inside the Chef's Kitchen - Chocolate Challenge, and Fitness Friday	No
February 15	Regis Philbin & Kelly Ripa	Yes	Reggie Bush, Taye Diggs, Corbin Bleu, Project Ack Ack, and Regis & Kelly's Crash Course	No
February 16	Regis Philbin & Kelly Ripa	Yes	Nicole Richie, Regis & Kelly's Crash Course, and Daytona 500 Winner	No
February 17	Regis Philbin & Kelly Ripa	Yes	Lauren Fix, Michelle Williams, Christoph Waltz, and Regis & Kelly's Crash Course	Yes
February 18	Regis Philbin & Kelly Ripa	Yes	Sir Ben Kingsley, Shenae Grimes, and Regis & Kelly's Crash Course	No
February 19	Regis Philbin & Kelly Ripa	Yes	Ewan McGregor, Regis & Kelly's Crash Course, and Fitness Friday	No
February 22	Regis Philbin & Kelly Ripa	Yes	Ethan Hawke, Shaun White, and Coast to Coast Makeovers	No
February 23	Regis Philbin & Kelly Ripa	Yes	Diane Sawyer and Coast to Coast Makeovers	Yes
February 24	Regis Philbin & Kelly Ripa	Yes	Jeffrey Donovan, Joan Rivers, and Coast to Coast Makeovers	No
February 25	Regis Philbin & Kelly Ripa	Yes	Bruce Willis and Coast to Coast Makeovers	Yes
February 26	Regis Philbin & Kelly Ripa	Yes	Maggie Gyllenhaal, Coast to Coast Makeovers, and Fitness Friday	No

== March 2010 ==
Date	Co-Hosts	"Host Chat"	Guests/Segments	"Regis and Kelly Inbox"
March 1	Regis Philbin & Kelly Ripa	Yes	Chris O'Donnell, Carrie Ann Inaba, and Beautiful Baby Week	Yes
March 2	Regis Philbin & Kelly Ripa	Yes	Jake Pavelka, Johnny Weir and Beautiful Baby Week	No
March 3	Regis Philbin & Kelly Ripa	Yes	Heidi Klum, Jeff Garlin, Corinne Bailey Rae, and Beautiful Baby Week	Yes
March 4	Regis Philbin & Kelly Ripa	Yes	Tom Hanks, Tom Brokaw, and Beautiful Baby Week	No
March 5	Kelly Ripa & Anderson Cooper	Yes	Apolo Ohno, Beautiful Baby Week, John Walsh, Fitness Friday	No
March 8	Kelly Ripa & Mark Consuelos	Yes	Chace Crawford and Jason & Molly	Yes
March 9	Kelly Ripa & Andy Richter	Yes	Chelsea Handler, James Spader, and Chris Byrne the Toy Guy	Yes
March 10	Kelly Ripa & Ludacris	Yes	America Ferrera and Bret Michaels	No
March 11	Kelly Ripa & Jerry Seinfeld	Yes	Donald Trump and Peter Gros	No
March 12	Kelly Ripa & Anderson Cooper	Yes	Guy Fieri, Ted Danson and Fitness Friday	Yes
March 15	Regis Philbin & Kelly Ripa	Yes	Jennifer Aniston and The Script	No
March 16	Regis Philbin & Kelly Ripa	Yes	Kristen Stewart and Kirstie Alley	Yes
March 17	Regis Philbin & Kelly Ripa	Yes	Jude Law, Mindy Kaling, and Celtic Woman	No
March 18	Regis Philbin & Kelly Ripa	Yes	Gerard Butler and Toni Collette	No
March 19	Kelly Ripa & Kyle MacLachlan	Yes	Edie Falco, Joseph Fiennes and Fitness Friday	Yes
March 29	Regis Philbin & Kara DioGuardi	Yes	Kelsey Grammer, New York Auto Show Week	Yes
March 30	Regis Philbin & Joy Philbin	Yes	Jeff Goldblum, Daughtry, New York Auto Show Week	Yes
March 31	Regis Philbin & Cat Deeley	Yes	Tyler Perry, Barenaked Ladies, New York Auto Show Week	Yes

== April 2010 ==
Date	Co-Hosts	"Host Chat"	Guests/Segments	"Regis and Kelly Inbox"
April 1	Regis Philbin & Carrie Ann Inaba	Yes	Janet Jackson, Dancing with the Stars castoffs Shannen Doherty & Mark Ballas, New York Auto Show Week	Yes
April 2	Regis Philbin & Carrie Ann Inaba	Yes	Donald Trump, Mario Lopez, New York Auto Show Week, Fitness Friday	No
April 5	Regis Philbin & Kelly Ripa	Yes	Tori Spelling & Dean McDermott, Peter Krause, David Gray	No
April 6	Regis Philbin & Kelly Ripa	Yes	Carol Burnett, Michael Kors, Ringling Brothers Circus	No
April 7	Regis Philbin & Kelly Ripa	Yes	Tina Fey & Andie MacDowell	Yes
April 8	Kelly Ripa & Bruno Tonioli	Yes	Steve Carell, Dancing with the Stars castoffs Buzz Aldrin & Ashly Costa	Yes
April 9	Regis Philbin & Kelly Ripa	Yes	Anthony LaPaglia, Prom dresses, Fitness Friday	Yes
April 12	Regis Philbin & Kelly Ripa	Yes	Megan Mullally, Jane Lynch, CC Sabathia	No
April 13	Regis Philbin & Kelly Ripa	Yes	Michael J. Fox, Seth Meyers	Yes
April 14	Regis Philbin & Kelly Ripa	Yes	Demi Moore, Hilary Duff	Yes
April 15	Regis Philbin & Kelly Ripa	Yes	Chris Rock, Dancing with the Stars castoffs Aiden Turner & Edyta Śliwińska	No
April 16	Kelly Ripa & Nathan Lane	Yes	Tracy Morgan, three Project Runway finalists, Fitness Friday	No
April 19	Regis Philbin & Kelly Ripa	Yes	Sharon Osbourne, Train, Spring Into Gardening Week	No
April 20	Regis Philbin & Kelly Ripa	Yes	Jennifer Lopez, Sarah Silverman, Spring Into Gardening Week	Yes
April 21	Regis Philbin & Kelly Ripa	Yes	Susan Sarandon, Spring Into Gardening Week	Yes
April 22	Regis Philbin & Kelly Ripa	Yes	Zoe Saldaña, Dancing with the Stars castoffs Kate Gosselin & Tony Dovolani, Spring Into Gardening Week	No
April 23	Kelly Ripa & Anderson Cooper	Yes	Drew Brees, Project Runway winner, Spring Into Gardening Week, Fitness Friday	No
April 26	Regis Philbin & Kelly Ripa	Yes	Kristin Cavallari, Broadway Week	No
April 27	Regis Philbin & Kelly Ripa	Yes	Molly Ringwald, Brooke Shields, Broadway Week	Yes
April 28	Regis Philbin & Kelly Ripa	Yes	The Real Housewives of New Jersey, Broadway Week	No
April 29	Regis Philbin & Kelly Ripa	Yes	Robert Downey, Jr., Dancing with the Stars castoffs Jake Pavelka & Chelsie Hightower, Broadway Week	No
April 30	Regis Philbin & Kelly Ripa	Yes	David Letterman, Regis and Michael Strahan babysit Kelly's kids, Broadway Week, Fitness Friday	No

== May 2010 ==
Date	Co-Hosts	"Host Chat"	Guests/Segments	"Regis and Kelly Inbox"
May 3	Regis Philbin & Kelly Ripa	Yes	Betty White, Michael Weatherly, Halfway to Halloween Week	No
May 4	Regis Philbin & Kelly Ripa	Yes	Damon Wayans, Halfway to Halloween Week	No
May 5	Regis Philbin & Kelly Ripa	Yes	Tom Selleck, Joanna Philbin, Halfway to Halloween Week	No
May 6	Regis Philbin & Kelly Ripa	Yes	Joel McHale, Dancing with the Stars castoffs Pamela Anderson & Damian Whitewood, Halfway to Halloween Week	Yes
May 7	Regis Philbin & Kelly Ripa	Yes	Russell Crowe, Mario Lopez, Halfway to Halloween Week, Fitness Friday	No
May 10	Regis Philbin & Kelly Ripa	Yes	Denzel Washington, New Mom Makeovers Week	No
May 11	Regis Philbin & Kelly Ripa	Yes	Lucy Liu, New Mom Makeovers Week	Yes
May 12	Regis Philbin & Kelly Ripa	Yes	Queen Latifah, Beth Ostrosky Stern, New Mom Makeovers Week	No
May 13	Regis Philbin & Kelly Ripa	Yes	Teri Hatcher, Dancing with the Stars castoffs Niecy Nash & Louis van Amstel, New Mom Makeovers Week	No
May 14	Regis Philbin & Kelly Ripa	Yes	Amanda Seyfried, America's Next Top Model winner, New Mom Makeovers Week, Fitness Friday	No
May 17	Regis Philbin & Kelly Ripa	Yes	Jimmy Kimmel, Survivor: Heroes vs. Villains winner, Top Teacher Week	Yes
May 18	Regis Philbin & Kelly Ripa	Yes	Matthew Fox, Matthew Morrison, Top Teacher Week	No
May 19	Regis Philbin & Kelly Ripa	Yes	Ashton Kutcher, Miss USA, Top Teacher Week	No
May 20	Regis Philbin & Kelly Ripa	Yes	Mike Myers, Dancing with the Stars castoffs Chad Ochocinco & Cheryl Burke, Top Teacher Week	No
May 21	Regis Philbin & Kelly Ripa	Yes	Cameron Diaz, Top Teacher Week, Fitness Friday	No
May 24	Regis Philbin & Kelly Ripa	Yes	Kim Cattrall, Bret Michaels	No
May 25	Regis Philbin & Kelly Ripa	Yes	Jonas Brothers, Cynthia Nixon, Jewel	No
May 26	Regis Philbin & Kelly Ripa	Yes	Jake Gyllenhaal, Dancing with the Stars champions Nicole Scherzinger & Derek Hough, Biggest Loser winner	No
May 27	Regis Philbin & Kelly Ripa	Yes	Sarah Jessica Parker, Dancing with the Stars runners-up Evan Lysacek & Anna Trebunskaya, Dancing with the Stars castoffs Erin Andrews & Maksim Chmerkovskiy	No
May 28	Kelly Ripa & Anderson Cooper	Yes	Kristin Davis, Fitness Friday, Coast-to-Coast Firehouse Cook-Off	No
May 31	Regis Philbin & Kelly Ripa	Yes	Kim Kardashian, Jonah Hill, Keane	Yes

== June 2010 ==
Date	Co-Hosts	"Host Chat"	Guests/Segments	"Regis and Kelly Inbox"
June 1	Regis Philbin & Kelly Ripa	Yes	Chris Noth, American Idol winner Lee DeWyze	No
June 2	Regis Philbin & Kelly Ripa	Yes	Mark Feuerstein, American Idol runner-up Crystal Bowersox	Yes
June 3	Regis Philbin & Kelly Ripa	Yes	Demi Lovato, Carrot Top, Taio Cruz	No
June 4	Regis Philbin & Kelly Ripa	Yes	Katherine Heigl, John Corbett, Coast-to-Coast Firehouse Cook-Off	No
June 7	Kelly Ripa & Neil Patrick Harris	Yes	Molly Shannon, winner of Scripps National Spelling Bee	No
June 8	Kelly Ripa & Emeril Lagasse	Yes	Jessica Biel, Chris Byrne the Toy Guy	Yes
June 9	Kelly Ripa & Jerry Seinfeld	Yes	Liam Neeson, Kourtney & Khloé Kardashian	No
June 10	Kelly Ripa & Mark Consuelos	Yes	Bradley Cooper, Christina Aguilera, Coast-to-Coast Firehouse Cook-Off	No
June 14	Regis Philbin & Kelly Ripa	Yes	Sofía Vergara, Henry Winkler, Sarah McLachlan, Matthew Benson shares tips for growing an Upside-down garden.	Yes
June 15	Regis Philbin & Joy Philbin	Yes	Lea Michele, Jillian Michaels	No
June 16	Regis Philbin & Carrie Ann Inaba	Yes	Lisa Kudrow, David James Elliott, Charice Pempengco	No
June 17	Regis Philbin & Jane Krakowski	Yes	Jason Lee, Audrina Patridge	Yes
June 18	Regis Philbin & Joy Philbin	Yes	Miley Cyrus, Devo, Coast-to-Coast Firehouse Cook-Off	No
June 22	Regis Philbin & Lucy Liu	Yes	Salma Hayek Pinault, Padma Lakshmi	No
June 23	Regis Philbin & Joy Philbin	Yes	Tom Cruise, Miranda Cosgrove	No
June 24	Regis Philbin & Kristin Chenoweth	Yes	Adam Sandler, Cyndi Lauper	Yes
June 25	Regis Philbin & Bernadette Peters	Yes	Cameron Diaz, Coast-to-Coast Firehouse Cook-Off	No
June 28	Kelly Ripa & Mark Consuelos	Yes	Taylor Lautner, Michael Vartan	Yes
June 29	Regis Philbin & Kelly Ripa	Yes	Kristen Stewart, Rob Schneider	No
June 30	Regis Philbin & Kelly Ripa	Yes	Dolly Parton, Landon Donovan, Vern Yip	No

== July 2010 ==
Date	Co-Hosts	"Host Chat"	Guests/Segments	"Regis and Kelly Inbox"
July 1	Regis Philbin & Kelly Ripa	Yes	Dev Patel, Zach Braff	Yes
July 2	Regis Philbin & Kelly Ripa	Yes	Blair Underwood, Coast-to-Coast Firehouse Cook-Off	No
July 5	Regis Philbin & Kelly Ripa	Yes	Denis Leary, Hutch Dano, Summer School Week	No
July 6	Regis Philbin & Kelly Ripa	Yes	Nikki Reed, Julianne Moore, Summer School Week	No
July 7	Regis Philbin & Kelly Ripa	Yes	Bryce Dallas Howard, Russell Brand, Summer School Week	No
July 8	Regis Philbin & Kelly Ripa	Yes	Steve Carell, Squeeze, Summer School Week	No
July 9	Regis Philbin & Kelly Ripa	Yes	Jason Segel, Lamar & Khloé Odom, Summer School Week, Coast-to-Coast Firehouse Cook-Off	No
July 12	Regis Philbin & Kelly Ripa	Yes	LIVE! in Prince Edward Island, Peter Facinelli, Lady Antebellum, Kelly goes horseback riding around PEI with Carson Kressley	No
July 13	Regis Philbin & Kelly Ripa	Yes	LIVE! in Prince Edward Island, Harry Hamlin & Lisa Rinna, Caroline Rhea, Kelly Anne of Green Gables with Mark Consuelos, Michael Gelman & Art Moore	No
July 14	Regis Philbin & Kelly Ripa	Yes	LIVE! in Prince Edward Island, Stephen Moyer, Melanie Fiona, Regis becomes a fisherman for a day on the magnificent province of PEI	Yes
July 15	Regis Philbin & Kelly Ripa	Yes	LIVE! in Prince Edward Island, John Corbett, Elisha Cuthbert, OneRepublic, Regis throws a beach bash clambake	No
July 16	Regis Philbin & Kelly Ripa	Yes	Nicolas Cage, Jersey Shore cast, Coast-to-Coast Firehouse Cook-Off	No
July 19	Regis Philbin & Kelly Ripa	Yes	Paul Rudd, Enrique Iglesias, Get Wiggy With It: Summer Hair Week	Yes
July 20	Regis Philbin & Kelly Ripa	Yes	Robert Duvall, Get Wiggy With It: Summer Hair Week	Yes
July 21	Regis Philbin & Kelly Ripa	Yes	Kevin Connolly, Blue Man Group, Get Wiggy With It: Summer Hair Week	No
July 22	Regis Philbin & Kelly Ripa	Yes	January Jones, Dennis Haysbert, Get Wiggy With It: Summer Hair Week	No
July 23	Regis Philbin & Kelly Ripa	Yes	John O'Hurley, Get Wiggy With It: Summer Hair Week, Coast-to-Coast Firehouse Cook-Off	No
July 26	Regis Philbin & Kelly Ripa	Yes	Anne Heche, Matt Bomer	Yes
July 27	Regis Philbin & Kelly Ripa	Yes	Zac Efron, Cybill Shepherd	Yes
July 28	Regis Philbin & Kelly Ripa	Yes	Heidi Klum, Wilmer Valderrama	Yes
July 29	Regis Philbin & Kelly Ripa	Yes	Michael Keaton, Ann-Margret	Yes
July 30	Regis Philbin & Kelly Ripa	Yes	Kevin Kline, 3OH!3, Coast-to-Coast Firehouse Cook-Off	No

== August 2010 ==
Date	Co-Hosts	"Host Chat"	Guests/Segments	"Regis and Kelly Inbox"
August 2	Kelly Ripa & Piers Morgan	Yes	Eva Mendes, Rachel Zoe, Doggie Do's and Don'ts Week	No
August 3	Regis Philbin & Kelly Ripa	Yes	Cat Deeley, Mike Posner, Doggie Do's and Don'ts Week	No
August 4	Regis Philbin & Kelly Ripa	Yes	Will Ferrell, Doggie Do's and Don'ts Week	Yes
August 5	Regis Philbin & Kelly Ripa	Yes	Christiane Amanpour, The Bachelorette, Doggie Do's and Don'ts Week	No
August 6	Regis Philbin & Kelly Ripa	Yes	Dylan McDermott, Doggie Do's and Don'ts Week, Coast-to-Coast Firehouse Cook-Off	No
August 9	Kelly Ripa & Anderson Cooper	Yes	Julia Roberts, Buddy Valastro	No
August 10	Regis Philbin & Kelly Ripa	Yes	Sylvester Stallone, Gabourey Sidibe	Yes
August 11	Regis Philbin & Kelly Ripa	Yes	Anthony Edwards, Jessica Szohr	Yes
August 12	Regis Philbin & Kelly Ripa	Yes	Jason Bateman, Chris Bosh	No
August 13	Regis Philbin & Kelly Ripa	Yes	Jimmy Fallon, Sara Rue, Coast-to-Coast Firehouse Cook-Off	No
August 16	Regis Philbin & Kelly Ripa	Yes	Jonah Hill, Jane Lynch and Sarah McLachlan	No
August 17	Regis Philbin & Shannon Murphy	Yes	Emma Thompson, Joey Lawrence, winner of So You Think You Can Dance	Yes
August 18	Regis Philbin & Jayde Donovan	Yes	Maggie Gyllenhaal, Yo Gabba Gabba!, Hat Trends	No
August 19	Regis Philbin & Kristin Cruz	Yes	Jennifer Aniston, Kyle MacLachlan, Jordin Sparks	No
August 20	Regis Philbin & Jenn Hobby	Yes	Hayden Christensen, Melissa Joan Hart, Coast-to-Coast Firehouse Cook-Off	No

== See also ==
- Live with Regis and Kelly (season 18)
- Live with Regis and Kelly (season 19)
- Live with Regis and Kelly (season 20)
- Live with Regis and Kelly (season 21)
