= Live with Regis and Kelly season 23 =

Yes	denotes that a particular segment WAS aired.
No	denotes that a particular segment WAS NOT aired.
- denotes a "Special Week" (usually a week in which the show is taken on location)
- denotes a "Special Episode"
- denotes a "Theme Week"

This is a list of Live with Regis and Kelly episodes which were broadcast during the show's 23rd season. The list is ordered by air date.

Although the co-hosts may have read a couple of emails during the broadcast, it does not necessarily count as a "Regis and Kelly Inbox" segment.

== September 2010 ==
Date	Co-Hosts	"Host Chat"	Guests/Segments	"Regis and Kelly Inbox"
September 6	Regis Philbin & Kelly Ripa	Yes	Laura Linney, Bethenny Frankel, Train	Yes
September 7	Regis Philbin & Kelly Ripa	Yes	Katie Holmes, Tim Gunn	No
September 8	Regis Philbin & Kelly Ripa	Yes	Philip Seymour Hoffman, Ashley Tisdale, Sara Bareilles	Yes
September 9	Regis Philbin & Kelly Ripa	Yes	David Boreanaz, Fantasia Barrino	No
September 10	Kelly Ripa & Anderson Cooper	Yes	Kate Gosselin, Dara Torres	Yes
September 13	Regis Philbin & Kelly Ripa	Yes	Donald Trump, Steve Buscemi, Guinness World Record Breaker Week	No
September 14	Regis Philbin & Kelly Ripa	Yes	Blake Lively, Will Arnett, Guinness World Record Breaker Week	No
September 15	Regis Philbin & Kelly Ripa	Yes	Ben Affleck, Meredith Vieira, Guinness World Record Breaker Week	Yes
September 16	Regis Philbin & Kelly Ripa	Yes	Jon Hamm, Rachael Ray, Guinness World Record Breaker Week	No
September 17	Kelly Ripa & Anderson Cooper	Yes	Josh Brolin, Carey Mulligan, Guinness World Record Breaker Week	No
September 20	Regis Philbin & Kelly Ripa	Yes	Julianna Margulies, Sofia Vergara, Cory Monteith	No
September 21	Regis Philbin & Kelly Ripa	Yes	Shia LaBeouf, James Belushi	No
September 22	Regis Philbin & Kelly Ripa	Yes	LIVE's High Heel-a-thon, Kristin Chenoweth, AnnaLynne McCord	No
September 23	Regis Philbin & Kelly Ripa	Yes	Judy Sheindlin, Amy Poehler	No
September 24	Kelly Ripa & Bryant Gumbel	Yes	Susan Sarandon, Tom Selleck	No
September 27	Regis Philbin & Kelly Ripa	Yes	Katherine Heigl, Victoria Justice, Perfect Fit Week	Yes
September 28	Regis Philbin & Kelly Ripa	Yes	Michael Chiklis, Michael C. Hall, Perfect Fit Week	No
September 29	Regis Philbin & Kelly Ripa	Yes	Vanessa Williams and Perfect Fit Week	Yes
September 30	Regis Philbin & Kelly Ripa	Yes	Simon Baker, Jason Derulo, Perfect Fit Week	Yes

== October 2010 ==
Date	Co-Hosts	"Host Chat"	Guests/Segments	"Regis and Kelly Inbox"
October 1	Kelly Ripa & Michael Strahan	Yes	Sally Field, Perfect Fit Week	Yes
October 4	Regis Philbin & Kelly Ripa	Yes	Jennifer Hudson, Blair Underwood	Yes
October 5	Regis Philbin & Kelly Ripa	Yes	Bruce Willis, Michael Imperioli	Yes
October 6	Regis Philbin & Kelly Ripa	Yes	Diane Lane, David Archuleta	Yes
October 7	Regis Philbin & Kelly Ripa	Yes	Melina Kanakaredes, Michael Kors	Yes
October 8	Kelly Ripa & Guy Fieri	Yes	Mary-Louise Parker, Emma Roberts	Yes
October 11	Regis Philbin & Kelly Ripa	Yes	Helen Mirren, Lauren Conrad, Nicki Minaj & will.i.am	No
October 12	Regis Philbin & Kelly Ripa	Yes	Condoleezza Rice, Hilary Duff	Yes
October 13	Regis Philbin & Kelly Ripa	Yes	Morgan Freeman, Ivanka Trump	Yes
October 14	Regis Philbin & Kelly Ripa	Yes	Hilary Swank, James Earl Jones	Yes
October 15	Kelly Ripa & Mark Consuelos	Yes	Richard Dreyfuss, Elisabeth Moss	Yes
October 18	Regis Philbin & Kelly Ripa	Yes	Keri Russell, Nicole Polizzi & Jenni Farley	Yes
October 19	Regis Philbin & Kelly Ripa	Yes	Kristen Stewart, Jesse McCartney, Pee-Wee Herman	No
October 20	Regis Philbin & Kelly Ripa	Yes	Chris Meloni, Maggie Q, Plain White T's	Yes
October 21	Regis Philbin & Kelly Ripa	Yes	Jim Parsons, Judith Light, Dierks Bentley	No
October 22	Kelly Ripa & Shaun White	Yes	Cynthia Nixon, Juliette Lewis	No
October 25	Regis Philbin & Kelly Ripa	Yes	Michael Caine, Ed Westwick, Halloween Week	No
October 26	Regis Philbin & Kelly Ripa	Yes	Teri Hatcher, Halloween Week	Yes
October 27	Regis Philbin & Kelly Ripa	Yes	David Arquette, Taylor Swift, Halloween Week	No
October 28	Regis Philbin & Kelly Ripa	Yes	Jimmy Smits, Seal, Halloween Week	Yes
October 29	Regis Philbin & Kelly Ripa	Yes	LIVE's Halloween Bites Again: Chomped from the Headlines Spectacular, Will Ferrell	No

== November 2010 ==
Date	Co-Hosts	"Host Chat"	Guests/Segments	"Regis and Kelly Inbox"
November 1	Regis Philbin & Kelly Ripa	Yes	Jonah Hill, the winner of Project Runway, Thanksgiving with a Twist Week	Yes
November 2	Regis Philbin & Kelly Ripa	Yes	Robert Downey, Jr., Robin Roberts, Thanksgiving with a Twist Week	Yes
November 3	Regis Philbin & Kelly Ripa	Yes	Rosario Dawson, Jason Schwartzman, Thanksgiving with a Twist Week	No
November 4	Regis Philbin & Kelly Ripa	Yes	Tina Fey, Neon Trees, Thanksgiving with a Twist Week	Yes
November 5	Regis Philbin & Kelly Ripa	Yes	Jo Frost, Jesse Tyler Ferguson, Thanksgiving with a Twist Week	Yes
November 8	Regis Philbin & Kelly Ripa	Yes	Rachel McAdams, Jason Ritter, BFF Dream Team Makeover Week	No
November 9	Regis Philbin & Kelly Ripa	Yes	Harrison Ford, Olivia Wilde, BFF Dream Team Makeover Week	No
November 10	Regis Philbin & Kelly Ripa	Yes	Denzel Washington, Rainn Wilson, BFF Dream Team Makeover Week	No
November 11	Regis Philbin & Kelly Ripa	Yes	Russell Crowe, Ty Burrell, BFF Dream Team Makeover Week	No
November 12	Regis Philbin & Kelly Ripa	Yes	Tracy Morgan, BFF Dream Team Makeover Week	Yes
November 15	Regis Philbin & Kelly Ripa	Yes	Russell Brand, Rupert Grint	Yes
November 16	Regis Philbin & Kelly Ripa	Yes	Anne Hathaway, Emma Watson, Lee DeWyze	No
November 17	Regis Philbin & Kelly Ripa	Yes	Daniel Radcliffe, Chris Byrne the Toy Guy	No
November 18	Regis Philbin & Kelly Ripa	Yes	Jake Gyllenhaal, Anderson Cooper, Mark Sanchez	No
November 19	Regis Philbin & Kelly Ripa	Yes	Cher, Mandy Moore	No
November 22	Regis Philbin & Kelly Ripa	Yes	Steve Martin, Scott Caan, Sarah McLachlan	No
November 23	Regis Philbin & Kelly Ripa	Yes	Jessica Simpson, Cloris Leachman	Yes
November 24	Regis Philbin & Kelly Ripa	Yes	Colin Firth, Elton John & Leon Russell	No
November 26	Regis Philbin & Kelly Ripa	Yes	Billy Bob Thornton, Paul Shaffer	Yes
November 29	Regis Philbin & Kelly Ripa	Yes	LIVE! in Las Vegas, Jabbawockeez, Joel McHale, David Copperfield, Nicki Minaj, Regis remembers classic Las Vegas and shares highlights of present Las Vegas	No
November 30	Regis Philbin & Kelly Ripa	Yes	LIVE! in Las Vegas, Jersey Boys, Jimmy Kimmel, Cheryl Burke & Derek Hough, Kelly attempts to perform in Cirque du Soleil's Kà	No

== December 2010 ==
Date	Co-Hosts	"Host Chat"	Guests/Segments	"Regis and Kelly Inbox"
December 1	Regis Philbin & Kelly Ripa	Yes	LIVE! in Las Vegas, Blue Man Group, Selena Gomez, Terry Fator, Regis wakes from his own Vegas hangover	No
December 2	Regis Philbin & Kelly Ripa	Yes	LIVE! in Las Vegas, Jubilee Showgirls, Howie Mandel, Rod Stewart, See what happens on Kelly's Vegas-style girls night out!	No
December 6	Regis Philbin & Kelly Ripa	Yes	Ray Romano, Alyssa Milano, Perfect Holiday Gift Week	No
December 7	Regis Philbin & Kelly Ripa	Yes	James Franco, Daniel Dae Kim, Perfect Holiday Gift Week	No
December 8	Regis Philbin & Kelly Ripa	Yes	Amy Adams, Natasha Bedingfield, Perfect Holiday Gift Week	No
December 9	Regis Philbin & Kelly Ripa	Yes	Owen Wilson, Lucy Liu, Perfect Holiday Gift Week	Yes
December 10	Kelly Ripa & Nick Lachey	Yes	Aaron Eckhart, Mike Sorrentino, Perfect Holiday Gift Week	No
December 13	Regis Philbin & Kelly Ripa	Yes	Jessica Alba, Ice-T, Crystal Bowersox	Yes
December 14	Regis Philbin & Kelly Ripa	Yes	Jeff Bridges, Ricky Gervais, Annie Lennox	Yes
December 15	Regis Philbin & Kelly Ripa	Yes	Paul Rudd, Biggest Loser winner	Yes
December 16	Regis Philbin & Kelly Ripa	Yes	Reese Witherspoon, Teri Polo	Yes
December 17	Regis Philbin & Kelly Ripa	Yes	Robert De Niro, Michael Eisner	Yes
December 20	Regis Philbin & Kelly Ripa	Yes	Ben Stiller	Yes
December 21	Regis Philbin & Kelly Ripa	Yes	LIVE's Holiday Skating Party, Bette Midler, Katharine McPhee, Disney On Ice	No
December 22	Regis Philbin & Kelly Ripa	No	LIVE's Holiday Flashback Special: Raiding the Live Vault	No
December 31	Regis Philbin & Kelly Ripa	Yes	2010 Farewell Special: A Year In Review	No

== January 2011 ==
Date	Co-Hosts	"Host Chat"	Guests/Segments	"Regis and Kelly Inbox"
January 3	Regis Philbin & Kelly Ripa	Yes	Michelle Williams, Brad Womack, Happy New You Week	No
January 4	Regis Philbin & Kelly Ripa	Yes	Gwyneth Paltrow, Paula Abdul, Happy New You Week	No
January 5	Regis Philbin & Kelly Ripa	Yes	Kevin Spacey, Happy New You Week	Yes
January 6	Regis Philbin & Kelly Ripa	Yes	Roseanne Barr; Ronnie Ortiz-Magro, Paul DelVecchio & Vinny Guadagnino, Happy New You Week	No
January 7	Kelly Ripa & Neil Patrick Harris	Yes	Matt LeBlanc, Garrett Hedlund, Happy New You Week	Yes
January 10	Regis Philbin & Kelly Ripa	Yes	Seth Meyers, Suzanne Somers, Jennifer Connelly	Yes
January 11	Regis Philbin & Kelly Ripa	Yes	Seth Rogen, Leighton Meester	Yes
January 12	Regis Philbin & Kelly Ripa	Yes	Vince Vaughn, Minnie Driver	Yes
January 13	Regis Philbin & Kelly Ripa	Yes	Kevin James, Patti Stanger	Yes
January 14	Kelly Ripa & Randy Jackson	Yes	George Stephanopoulos, Ginnifer Goodwin	Yes
January 17	Regis Philbin & Kelly Ripa	Yes	David Duchovny, Kathy Bates	Yes
January 18	Regis Philbin & Kelly Ripa	Yes	Steven Tyler, Angie Dickinson, Leo Laporte gives Regis and Kelly a tech lesson with the coolest gadgets	Yes
January 19	Regis Philbin & Kelly Ripa	Yes	Kourtney & Kim Kardashian, Joan & Melissa Rivers, The Script	No
January 20	Regis Philbin & Kelly Ripa	Yes	Martin Short, Olivia Munn	Yes
January 21	Kelly Ripa & Ashton Kutcher	Yes	Jason Statham, Buddy Valastro	Yes
January 24	Kelly Ripa & Cory Fitzner	Yes	Anthony Hopkins	Yes
January 25	Kelly Ripa & Jeff Mauler	Yes	Alan Cumming	Yes
January 26	Kelly Ripa & Bobby Bones	Yes	Kyle Richards, Rico Rodriguez	Yes
January 27	Kelly Ripa & Eric Ferguson	Yes	Kelsey Grammer, Mark Feuerstein	Yes
January 28	Kelly Ripa & Mike Catherwood	Yes	Brooke Shields, Bryan Adams	Yes
January 31	Regis Philbin & Joy Philbin	Yes	Barbara Walters, Johnny Galecki, Twitter Week	Yes

== February 2011 ==
Date	Co-Hosts	"Host Chat"	Guests/Segments	"Regis and Kelly Inbox"
February 1	Regis Philbin & Kelly Ripa	Yes	Lisa Kudrow, Brooke Burke, Twitter Week	Yes
February 2	Regis Philbin & Kelly Ripa	Yes	Julianne Hough, Minka Kelly, Larry the Cable Guy, Twitter Week	Yes
February 3	Regis Philbin & Kelly Ripa	Yes	Justin Bieber, Twitter Week	Yes
February 4	Regis Philbin & Kelly Ripa	Yes	Bill Paxton, Annette Bening, Twitter Week	No
February 7	Regis Philbin & Kelly Ripa	Yes	Matthew Perry, Chris Colfer, Char Margolis, Regis and Kelly's 10th Anniversary Week	No
February 8	Regis Philbin & Kelly Ripa	Yes	Martin Lawrence, Donald Trump, Regis and Kelly's 10th Anniversary Week	No
February 9	Regis Philbin & Kelly Ripa	Yes	Michelle Obama, David Letterman, Regis and Kelly's 10th Anniversary Week	Yes
February 10	Regis Philbin & Kelly Ripa	Yes	Elton John, Jerry Seinfeld, Regis and Kelly's 10th Anniversary Week	No
February 11	Regis Philbin & Kelly Ripa	Yes	Adam Sandler, Anderson Cooper, Regis and Kelly's 10th Anniversary Week	No
February 14	Regis Philbin & Kelly Ripa	Yes	Michael Caine, Diane Kruger, World's Greatest Love Story Week	No
February 15	Regis Philbin & Kelly Ripa	Yes	Jeff Probst, Josh Groban, World's Greatest Love Story Week	No
February 16	Regis Philbin & Kelly Ripa	Yes	Forest Whitaker, Alex Trebek, World's Greatest Love Story Week	Yes
February 17	Regis Philbin & Kelly Ripa	Yes	William H. Macy, World's Greatest Love Story Week	Yes
February 18	Regis Philbin & Kelly Ripa	Yes	January Jones, World's Greatest Love Story Week	Yes
February 21	Regis Philbin & Kelly Ripa	Yes	David Spade, Hayden Panettiere, Good Charlotte	No
February 22	Regis Philbin & Kelly Ripa	Yes	Kiefer Sutherland, Betty White	No
February 23	Regis Philbin & Kelly Ripa	Yes	Amy Poehler, Nicole Polizzi	No
February 24	Regis Philbin & Kelly Ripa	Yes	Kim Cattrall, Jason Patric	No
February 25	Regis Philbin & Kelly Ripa	Yes	Thomas Gibson, Regis and Kelly's Run Across America with Dean Karnazes begins	No
February 28	Regis Philbin & Kelly Ripa	Yes	Emily Blunt, Topher Grace	No

== March 2011 ==
Date	Co-Hosts	"Host Chat"	Guests/Segments	"Regis and Kelly Inbox"
March 1	Regis Philbin & Kelly Ripa	Yes	Isla Fisher, Matt Bomer	Yes
March 2	Regis Philbin & Kelly Ripa	Yes	Donald Trump, Abigail Breslin	Yes
March 3	Regis Philbin & Kelly Ripa	Yes	Vanessa Hudgens, Josh Radnor	No
March 4	Kelly Ripa & Josh Groban	Yes	Heather Locklear, La Toya Jackson	Yes
March 7	Regis Philbin & Kelly Ripa	Yes	Matthew McConaughey, Darren Criss	No
March 8	Regis Philbin & Kelly Ripa	Yes	Robin Williams, Peter Gros	No
March 9	Regis Philbin & Kelly Ripa	Yes	Amanda Seyfried, Donnie Wahlberg	Yes
March 10	Regis Philbin & Kelly Ripa	Yes	Jennifer Lopez, Miguel	Yes
March 11	Kelly Ripa & Andy Cohen	Yes	Aaron Eckhart, John Leguizamo	No
March 14	Regis Philbin & Kelly Ripa	Yes	Edie Falco, Matthew Morrison, American Idol castoff Ashthon Jones	No
March 15	Regis Philbin & Kelly Ripa	Yes	Jason Bateman	Yes
March 16	Regis Philbin & Kelly Ripa	Yes	Bradley Cooper, Jennifer Beals	No
March 17	Regis Philbin & Kelly Ripa	Yes	Daniel Radcliffe, Bridget Moynahan	No
March 18	Kelly Ripa & Michael Bublé	Yes	Paul Giamatti	No
March 28	Regis Philbin & Joy Philbin	Yes	Sela Ward, Bindi Irwin, American Idol castoff Karen Rodriguez	Yes
March 29	Regis Philbin & Lisa Rinna	Yes	Sara Ramirez, Susan Lucci	Yes
March 30	Regis Philbin & Cat Deeley	Yes	James Marsden, Dana Delany	Yes
March 31	Regis Philbin & Carrie Ann Inaba	Yes	Jake Gyllenhaal, Howie Mandel, Dancing with the Stars castoffs Mike Catherwood & Lacey Schwimmer	No

== April 2011 ==
Date	Co-Hosts	"Host Chat"	Guests/Segments	"Regis and Kelly Inbox"
April 4	Regis Philbin & Kelly Ripa	Yes	Chris Rock, American Idol castoffs Naima Adedapo & Thia Megia	No
April 5	Regis Philbin & Kelly Ripa	Yes	Uma Thurman, Barbara Eden	No
April 6	Regis Philbin & Kelly Ripa	Yes	Jennifer Garner, Jesse Tyler Ferguson, Caroline Kennedy	Yes
April 7	Regis Philbin & Kelly Ripa	Yes	Jim Belushi, Ian Somerhalder, Dancing with the Stars castoffs Wendy Williams & Tony Dovolani	Yes
April 8	Kelly Ripa & Russell Brand	Yes	Kristin Davis, Trudie Styler	Yes
April 11	Regis Philbin & Kelly Ripa	Yes	Paul Reiser, Bridgit Mendler, American Idol castoff Pia Toscano	No
April 12	Regis Philbin & Kelly Ripa	Yes	Bret Michaels, Elisha Cuthbert	Yes
April 13	Regis Philbin & Kelly Ripa	Yes	Gwyneth Paltrow, John Larroquette	Yes
April 14	Regis Philbin & Kelly Ripa	Yes	Courteney Cox, Amar'e Stoudemire, Dancing with the Stars castoffs Sugar Ray Leonard & Anna Trebunskaya	Yes
April 15	Kelly Ripa & Mike Catherwood	Yes	David Arquette	Yes
April 18	Kelly Ripa & Seth Meyers	Yes	Robert Pattinson, American Idol castoff Paul McDonald, New York Auto Show Week	No
April 19	Kelly Ripa & Michael Strahan	Yes	Reese Witherspoon, New York Auto Show Week	Yes
April 20	Kelly Ripa & Christian Slater	Yes	Ben Stiller, Christoph Waltz, New York Auto Show Week	Yes
April 21	Kelly Ripa & Bruno Tonioli	Yes	Kathleen Turner, Dancing with the Stars castoffs Petra Němcová & Dmitry Chaplin, New York Auto Show Week	No
April 22	Kelly Ripa & Josh Groban	Yes	Kirstie Alley, Olivia Wilde, New York Auto Show Week	Yes
April 25	Regis Philbin & Mel B	Yes	Mark Ruffalo, American Idol castoff Stefano Langone, Royal Wedding Week	No
April 26	Regis Philbin & Kelly Ripa	Yes	Kara DioGuardi, Royal Wedding Week	Yes
April 27	Regis Philbin & Kelly Ripa	Yes	Orlando Bloom, Martha Plimpton, Royal Wedding Week	No
April 28	Regis Philbin & Kelly Ripa	Yes	Alec Baldwin, Nina Dobrev, Dancing with the Stars castoffs, Royal Wedding Week	No
April 29	Regis Philbin & Kelly Ripa	Yes	Eva La Rue, Finola Hughes, Royal Wedding Week	No

== May 2011 ==
Date	Co-Hosts	"Host Chat"	Guests/Segments	"Regis and Kelly Inbox"
May 2	Regis Philbin & Kelly Ripa	Yes	Eva Mendes, American Idol castoff Casey Abrams, Whiz Kids Week	Yes
May 3	Regis Philbin & Kelly Ripa	Yes	Andy Samberg, Melissa McCarthy, Whiz Kids Week	No
May 4	Regis Philbin & Kelly Ripa	Yes	John Krasinski, Maggie Q, Whiz Kids Week	No
May 5	Regis Philbin & Kelly Ripa	Yes	Kate Hudson, Jennifer Hudson, Dancing with the Stars castoffs, Whiz Kids Week	No
May 6	Regis Philbin & Kelly Ripa	Yes	Jodie Foster, Ginnifer Goodwin, Whiz Kids Week	No
May 9	Regis Philbin & Kelly Ripa	Yes	Chelsea Handler, American Idol castoff Jacob Lusk, Top Teacher Week	No
May 10	Regis Philbin & Kelly Ripa	Yes	Keira Knightley, Top Teacher Week, Regis and Kelly's Run Across America with Dean Karnazes ends	No
May 11	Regis Philbin & Kelly Ripa	Yes	Patricia Heaton, TAmazing Race winners, Top Teacher Week	No
May 12	Regis Philbin & Kelly Ripa	Yes	Penélope Cruz, Chris Hemsworth, Top Teacher Week	Yes
May 13	Regis Philbin & Kelly Ripa	Yes	Will Ferrell, Chris Colfer, Top Teacher Week	No
May 16	Regis Philbin & Kelly Ripa	Yes	Jimmy Kimmel, Jane Lynch, American Idol castoff James Durbin	No
May 17	Regis Philbin & Kelly Ripa	Yes	Chris O'Donnell, Tom Welling, Ellie Goulding	No
May 18	Regis Philbin & Kelly Ripa	Yes	Eric Stonestreet, Survivor: Redemption Island winner, Matthew Morrison	Yes
May 19	Regis Philbin & Kelly Ripa	Yes	Tom Selleck, Dancing with the Stars castoffs, Dream Home Giveaway winners, The Garrity's, are selected	No
May 20	Regis Philbin & Kelly Ripa	Yes	Geoffrey Rush, Dream Home Giveaway family, The Garrity's, move into their new house	Yes
May 23	Regis Philbin & Kelly Ripa	Yes	Jimmy Fallon, American Idol castoff Haley Reinhart, Winning Week featuring The Celebrity Apprentice	No
May 24	Regis Philbin & Kelly Ripa	Yes	Jack Black, Julie Bowen, Winning Week featuring LIVE! Run Across America Watch to Win finalists	No
May 25	Regis Philbin & Kelly Ripa	Yes	Lucy Liu, Winning Week featuring The Biggest Loser and Dancing with the Stars champions	Yes
May 26	Regis Philbin & Kelly Ripa	Yes	Dancing with the Stars castoffs, Winning Week featuring National Geographic Bee champion	No
May 27	Kelly Ripa & Pat Tomasulo	Yes	Heather Graham, Plain White T's, Winning Week featuring Top Chef: All Stars winner	No
May 30	Regis Philbin & Kelly Ripa	Yes	Christina Aguilera, James McAvoy, Allstar Weekend, Miss USA contestants	No

== June 2011 ==
Date	Co-Hosts	"Host Chat"	Guests/Segments	"Regis and Kelly Inbox"
June 1	Regis Philbin & Kelly Ripa	Yes	Kevin Bacon, American Idol runner-up Lauren Alaina	No
June 2	Regis Philbin & Kelly Ripa	Yes	Barbara Sinatra, American Idol winner Scotty McCreery	No
June 3	Regis Philbin & Kelly Ripa	Yes	Ellen Barkin, Buddy Valastro	Yes
June 4	Regis Philbin & Kelly Ripa	Yes	Ewan McGregor, Mike Rowe, Francis Anthony	No
June 6	Kelly Ripa & Mark Consuelos	Yes	Kyle Chandler, Matt Bomer	Yes
June 7	Regis Philbin & Kelly Ripa	Yes	Marc Anthony, Kourtney & Khloé Kardashian, Carl Edwards	No
June 8	Regis Philbin & Kelly Ripa	Yes	Jim Parsons, Faith Ford, World Ocean Day	No
June 9	Regis Philbin & Kelly Ripa	Yes	Carla Gugino, Natasha Bedingfield	No
June 10	Regis Philbin & Kelly Ripa	Yes	Jason Lee, Jennifer Lawrence, Kenny Callaghan	Yes
June 13	Regis & Joy Philbin	Yes	Angela Bassett, Emma Roberts	Yes
June 14	Regis Philbin & Betty White	Yes	Blake Lively, Jeff Gordon, Jordin Sparks	Yes
June 15	Regis Philbin & Kristin Chenoweth	Yes	Ryan Reynolds, Larry the Cable Guy	No
June 16	Regis Philbin & Michelle Beadle	Yes	Jim Carrey, Michael Bolton	No
June 17	Regis Philbin & Kara DioGuardi	Yes	Ryan & Tatum O'Neal, Carson Kressley	No
June 27	Regis Philbin & Kelly Ripa	Yes	Patrick Dempsey, Mark Feuerstein, David Gray, Regis and Kelly win Daytime Emmy Awards	Yes
June 28	Regis Philbin & Kelly Ripa	Yes	Selena Gomez, Rosie Huntington-Whiteley	No
June 29	Regis Philbin & Kelly Ripa	Yes	Tom Hanks, Ken Jeong, David Cook	No
June 30	Regis Philbin & Kelly Ripa	Yes	Shia LaBeouf, Jill Scott	Yes

== July 2011 ==
Date	Co-Hosts	"Host Chat"	Guests/Segments	"Regis and Kelly Inbox"
July 1	Regis Philbin & Kelly Ripa	Yes	Josh Duhamel, The Real Housewives of New Jersey, Andrew Carmellini	No
July 4	Regis Philbin & Kelly Ripa	Yes	Rosario Dawson, Julie Andrews, Summer in the City Week	No
July 5	Regis Philbin & Kelly Ripa	Yes	Kevin James, Rose Byrne, Summer in the City Week	No
July 6	Regis Philbin & Kelly Ripa	Yes	Larry David, Bernadette Peters, Summer in the City Week	No
July 7	Regis Philbin & Kelly Ripa	Yes	Jennifer Aniston, Rick Springfield, Summer in the City Week	No
July 8	Regis Philbin & Kelly Ripa	Yes	Jason Bateman, Poppy Montgomery, Summer in the City Week	No
July 11	Regis Philbin & Kelly Ripa	Yes	Kyra Sedgwick, Rupert Grint, Fix My Man Week	Yes
July 12	Regis Philbin & Kelly Ripa	Yes	Emma Watson, Fix My Man Week	No
July 13	Regis Philbin & Kelly Ripa	Yes	Glenn Close, Blake Shelton, Fix My Man Week	No
July 14	Regis Philbin & Kelly Ripa	Yes	Daniel Radcliffe, Joss Stone, Fix My Man Week	No
July 15	Regis Philbin & Kelly Ripa	Yes	Lisa Kudrow, Tom Felton, Fix My Man Week	No
July 18	Regis Philbin & Kelly Ripa	Yes	Mila Kunis, Do It Week	No
July 19	Regis Philbin & Kelly Ripa	Yes	Marisa Tomei, Hot Chelle Rae, Do It Week	No
July 20	Regis Philbin & Kelly Ripa	Yes	Justin Timberlake, Andy Grammer, Do It Week	No
July 21	Regis Philbin & Kelly Ripa	Yes	Adrian Grenier, Aretha Franklin, Do It Week	No
July 22	Regis Philbin & Kelly Ripa	Yes	Jeremy Piven, Thomas Kelly, Do It Week	No
July 25	Kelly Ripa & Neil Patrick Harris	Yes	Heidi Klum, Jayma Mays, Rescue Me! Ambush Makeovers Week	No
July 26	Regis Philbin & Kelly Ripa	Yes	Steve Carell, Ray Davies, Rescue Me! Ambush Makeovers Week	No
July 27	Regis Philbin & Kelly Ripa	Yes	Sofia Vergara, OneRepublic, Rescue Me! Ambush Makeovers Week	No
July 28	Regis Philbin & Kelly Ripa	Yes	Julianne Moore, 3 Doors Down, Rescue Me! Ambush Makeovers Week	No
July 29	Regis Philbin & Kelly Ripa	Yes	Craig Ferguson, Michael Psilakis, Rescue Me! Ambush Makeovers Week	No

== August 2011 ==
Date	Co-Hosts	"Host Chat"	Guests/Segments	"Regis and Kelly Inbox"
August 1	Kelly Ripa & Josh Groban	Yes	Colin Farrell, Ashley Fink, Science Bob	Yes
August 2	Regis Philbin & Kelly Ripa	Yes	Cory Monteith, Ashley Hebert & J.P. Rosenbaum	No
August 3	Regis Philbin & Kelly Ripa	Yes	Alexander Skarsgård, Melissa Joan Hart	Yes
August 4	Regis Philbin & Kelly Ripa	Yes	Bryce Dallas Howard, Caroline Rhea	Yes
August 5	Regis Philbin & Kelly Ripa	Yes	Viola Davis, Kevin McHale, Marcela Valladolid	No
August 9	Regis Philbin & Kelly Ripa	Yes	Jane Fonda, Jennifer Farley, Luke Bryan	No
August 10	Regis Philbin & Kelly Ripa	Yes	Elijah Wood, Paul DelVecchio	Yes
August 11	Regis Philbin & Kelly Ripa	Yes	Emma Stone, Nicole Polizzi	No
August 15	Regis Philbin & Kelly Ripa	Yes	Paul Rudd, Henry Winkler, Dog Days of Summer Week	Yes
August 16	Regis & Joy Philbin	Yes	Joel McHale, Pia Toscano, Dog Days of Summer Week	No
August 17	Regis Philbin & Erin Andrews	Yes	Jeff Bridges, So You Think You Can Dance winner, Dog Days of Summer Week	Yes
August 18	Regis Philbin & Cat Deeley	Yes	Anne Hathaway, Nicole Scherzinger, Dog Days of Summer Week	No
August 19	Regis Philbin & Jane Krakowski	Yes	Helen Mirren, Dog Days of Summer Week	No
