= Derek Murphy =

Derek Murphy may refer to:

- Derek Murphy (musician), American drummer and session musician
- Sadat X (Derek Murphy, born 1968), American rapper
- Derek Murphy (blogger), blogger and journalist
