= Homemade Millionaire =

2010 American television series

- Presented by: Kelly Ripa
- Judges: Huck Nicola; Jennifer Cotter
- Country of origin: United States
- No. of series: 1
- No. of episodes: 6

Production
- Production location: New York City

Original release
- Network: TLC
- Release: November 19 – December 24, 2010

Homemade Millionaire is a reality television series featuring aspiring inventors and entrepreneurs drawn from public auditions. Each week, three entrepreneurs and their products are tested and advised by coaches Ed Evangelista or Wendy Robbins as they pitch their product to the executives of Home Shopping Network (HSN) in New York. One product each week is selected to be featured and sold on the network, which gains the inventors exposure, professional product guidance, and potential sales to over 90 million HSN customers.

== Format ==
Each week, three entrepreneurs and their products are tested. First, the contestants are introduced to either Ed Evangelista or Wendy Robbins, who will coach them through the process of refining their product and sales pitch for their final presentation to HSN.

The first stage consists of the contestant presenting their product in a three-minute pitch to a focus group of consumers, while Kelly Ripa and their coach watch from a separate room and discuss concerns they have with the contestant's product or presentation. Each contestant is given feedback by the focus group and by the coaches, and one contestant is eliminated based on focus group scores.

In the second stage, spread over two days, the inventors' products and sales skills are evaluated in a two task challenge. The particular tasks depend on the products featured in each episode, and the inventors are given additional feedback and guidance from a guest advisor from the field (generally someone with experience selling products from that field on HSN). The first task may range from staging a photo shoot for promotional materials for their product, to developing further variations of their product to build a marketable product line, and is judged by the guest advisor. The second task involves having the products evaluated for sales potential, which may range from pitching the product to potential customers in stores, staging a fashion show, or having their products tested and rated by Good Housekeeping.

The third stage occurs two weeks later after contestants have been given time to refine their product and pitches using the feedback received during the first two stages in order to increase their chances of their product being added to the HSN lineup. The inventors present their product to Kelly Ripa, Jennifer Cotter (HSN Senior VP, Television), Huck Nicola (HSN VP, Merchandising and Product Development), and a judge with experience in the field of product is targeting. The executive board selects one product to be added to the HSN lineup based upon product uniqueness, how well they expect it to sell, how profitable it may be, and how well the product is pitched (as the inventor will be presenting the product on HSN to potential buyers).

== Episodes ==
=== Episode 1 ===
- Product category: Beauty
- Original Air Date: November 19, 2010
- Inventors:
  - Stefany DiManno: DiManno Designs Hair Cuffs (decorative hair ties)
  - Marcy McKenna: The Styling Station (a cabinet to organize hair care supplies)
  - Tonya Englebrecht: MagicKurl (hair rollers that do not require clips or a hairdryer to use)
- Focus Group: Stefany was eliminated, as the focus group thought her product was not very original or unique.
- Second Stage:
  - Guest Advisor: Stacey Schieffelin, founder of ybf Cosmetics at HSN
  - Task One: Contestants had half an hour to produce a set of before and after photos of the use of their product, to demonstrate how it solved a problem for consumers. The guest advisor decided that Marcy's photos for the Styling Station were the most compelling, out of the two products.
  - Task Two: Contestants had to use their before-and-after shots and the product itself to poll customers around Ricky's NYC beauty supply store as to whether or not they would purchase the product. Customers voted for whether they would purchase the product or not by dropping hair curlers into marked jars. Marcy received 24 yeses and 1 no; Tonya received 19 yeses and 0 nos.
- Final Pitch: The executives selected Marcy and the Styling Station as the winner.
  - Guest Executive Judge: Jennifer Flavin-Stallone, co-founder, Serious Skin Care line at HSN

=== Episode 2 ===
- Product category: Kitchen
- Original Air Date: November 26, 2010
- Inventors:
  - Kitty Stallings: Portion Perfect Glassware & Dinnerware (plates and glasses with pre-measured portions marked; for the final pitch it was expanded into the Kitty's Lighter Weigh program, which also includes a cookbook/diet guide)
  - Debra Koplish: Cake Huggers (edible liners for cupcakes; for the final pitch it was rebranded Bake Huggers and expanded to include edible liners for other baked goods and decorating kits)
  - Kim Maguire and Eileen Walker: Bevi Bags (refillable, disposable beverage pouches)
- Focus Group: Kim and Eileen were eliminated as the focus group had concerns about potential spillage, environmental waste (due to the disposable nature of the product), and the originality of the product (as it was similar in concept to non-refillable drink pouches already on the market).
- Second Stage:
  - Guest Advisor: Ingrid Hoffman, cook and cookbook author; creator of the "Simply Delicioso" Cooking line at HSN
  - Task One: Contestants had to produce four food presentation images that best illustrate their product and its diverse uses. The guest advisor decided that Debra's photos for Cake Huggers were the most compelling, out of the two products.
  - Task Two: Contestants had to use their images and their products to poll customers at the Time Warner Center as to whether or not they'd purchase the product. Customers would drop a spoon into a correspondingly labeled jar to indicate whether they would buy the product or not. Kitty received 26 yeses and 2 nos; Debra received 52 yeses and 0 nos.
- Final Pitch: The executives selected Debra and the rebranded Bake Huggers as the winner.
  - Guest Executive Judge: Emeril Lagasse, celebrity chef and restaurateur; founder of Emeril Collection at HSN

=== Episode 3 ===
- Product category: Fashion
- Original Air Date: December 3, 2010
- Inventors:
  - Carissa Brown: "Carissa Rose" Full-Bust Clothing Line (shirts designed for women with full busted figures)
  - Jennifer Martinson: Magic Dress (a wrap dress in various lengths that can be worn in a wide variety of configurations)
  - Erika Wilson: Purse Flats (a clutch purse that contains a pair of foldable ballet flats and an expandable bag for carrying the switched-out footwear)
- Focus Group: Erika was eliminated. The focus group thought the idea wasn't new (many already carried flats in their own, larger purses, and so didn't need two more bags to worry about).
- Second Stage:
  - Guest Advisor: Diane Gilman, designer of the Diane Gilman Collection at HSN
  - Task One: Contestants had the assistance and resources of The Style Council design and manufacturing studio to produce three new distinctive design concepts for the garments, one of which would be produced in a unique print designed by the contestants. The guest advisor decided that Jennifer was the most successful in this task.
  - Task Two: Contestants had to stage a fashion show using their products, as well as the new design concepts and patterns produced in the previous task. Viewers of the fashion show would vote as to which fashion line they preferred. Jennifer received 75% of the audience votes.
- Final Pitch: The executives selected Jennifer and the Magic Dress as the winner.
  - Guest Executive Judge: Mark Badgley and James Mischka, designers of the Badgley Mischka fashion line at HSN

=== Episode 4 ===
- Product category: Home
- Original Air Date: December 10, 2010
- Inventors:
  - Sarah Haviland: "Think" Natural Cleaning Products (a cleaning product line with natural ingredients, originally advertised to have health benefits)
  - Haris Lender: Luv A Cuva (a blanket with each side being a different thickness, to compensate for couples who share beds but disagree on blanket thickness for sleeping)
  - Robyn Zimmer: Window Origami (curtains with buttons, hooks, and decorative clips that can be folded and set up in a variety of styles to decorate a room)
- Focus Group: Haris was eliminated, as the focus group didn't find the product aesthetically pleasing.
- Second Stage:
  - Guest Advisor: Colin Cowie, designer and creator of the Colin Cowie Home Collection at HSN
  - Task One: Contestants were challenged to create a concept board for their product using a product image and text to highlight its top five most compelling benefits. The guest advisor decided that Sarah was the most successful in this task.
  - Task Two: The products from each contestant are tested by Good Housekeeping's research institute by staff and recruited consumers. Sarah's products were rated as follows: 3/5 to 3.5/5 (laundry detergent), 2.5/5 (window cleaner), and 3.5 (all-purpose cleaner). Robyn's product was rated: 1/5 (fabric one), 5/5 (fabric two), and 4.5/5 (ease of use), with the other three fabrics performing well (but with no mentioned ratings).
- Final Pitch: The executives selected Sarah and the "Think" Natural Cleaning Products as the winner. (The final pitch for Sarah was presented by her husband Mike, as Sarah was experiencing pregnancy complications.)
  - Guest Executive Judge: Jeffrey Banks, designers of the Jeffrey Banks Home Collection at HSN
