= Ed Evangelista =

Ed Evangelista is an American executive creative director, visual designer in branded content and communication. He worked as a judge on the ABC reality television show American Inventor. He also starred with Kelly Ripa on Homemade Millionaire, which aired on TLC. He is also an executive creative director at HAVAS WW in New York City.

== Career ==
Evangelista is known for his work building platforms for branded entertainment, mobile content, and integrated communication. His expertise is in the content and delivery of alternative, digital, and traditional media by bringing brands, ideas, and entertainment together to create new experiences that engage consumers.

Evangelista was a judge on ABC-TV reality show American Inventor, which was produced by Simon Cowell. On TLC's Homemade Millionaire TV Show, Evangelista starred with Ripa as a coach and mentor helping women win contracts to sell their new inventions on the Home Shopping Network.

Evangelista is best known for his creative work for DeBeers, particularly the successful launch of Three Stone Jewelry and the Right Hand Ring. He has worked with many famous brands, including Smirnoff, Rolex, MCI, Philips Electronics, Volvo, Elizabeth Arden, Life magazine, Sunsilk, Sony, Merrill Lynch, NY Life, Atlantic City, Coppertone and Dr.Scholls to name a few.

He combined marketing and entertainment for the launch of Unilever's Sunsilk, called "LoveBites" for TBS. These were 65 two-minute TV episodes that ran after Sex and the City and kept over 70% of viewers engaged. He was also instrumental in the launch of Sunsilk's Colorshowdown and colorshowdown.com, which features the blondes versus brunettes debate. He is involved in a variety of branding, TV, web, and mobile projects. He has won major advertising awards, including the One Show Gold and the Cannes Lion. Evangelista and his work have been quoted and profiled in the WSJ, NYT, Archive, Graphis, Adweek, AdAge, and Entrepreneur.com.

Evangelista graduated from the School of Visual Arts in New York City with a Bachelor of Fine Arts.
