= Derek Murphy (blogger) =

Derek Murphy is an American blogger and journalist known for writing the Marathon Investigation blog, which investigates suspected cheaters at marathons, triathlons and other running events.

== Marathon Investigation Blog ==
Murphy became interested in investigating suspected marathon cheats after reading posts on LetsRun.com about Mike Rossi, suspected of cheating at the 2014 LeHigh Valley Marathon. This led him to start the Marathon Investigation website and blog in 2015, and to begin looking at individuals who might have cheated in order to qualify for the Boston Marathon. Over time, he began to look at cheats as well as so-called 'bib bandits' in other events.

Murphy compares race times to find likely cheaters, and assesses publicly available Strava data as well as race photos, chip splits and eyewitness statements to determine whether runners have cheated. His investigations are regularly picked up by national and international press, notably in the case of Murphy identifying over 300 cheats at the Honolulu Marathon.

An investigation by Murphy and others on running forums of Frank Meza, a "lifelong runner", also attracted widespread press. Meza supposedly ran "faster than the official world record" for his age group and was disqualified and banned from multiple races for suspected cheating. He subsequently took his own life, leading some to criticize an online culture that 'hounded' and 'bullied' suspected cheats.

=== Criticism ===
Murphy's approach has attracted criticism within the running community and from external commentators who feel his investigations expose people to disproportionate backlash for a relatively minor offense.

== Personal life ==
Murphy lives in Cincinnati, Ohio, where he works as a business analyst. He is married with two children and is a former runner himself.
