= Cynthia Basinet =

American actress and singer

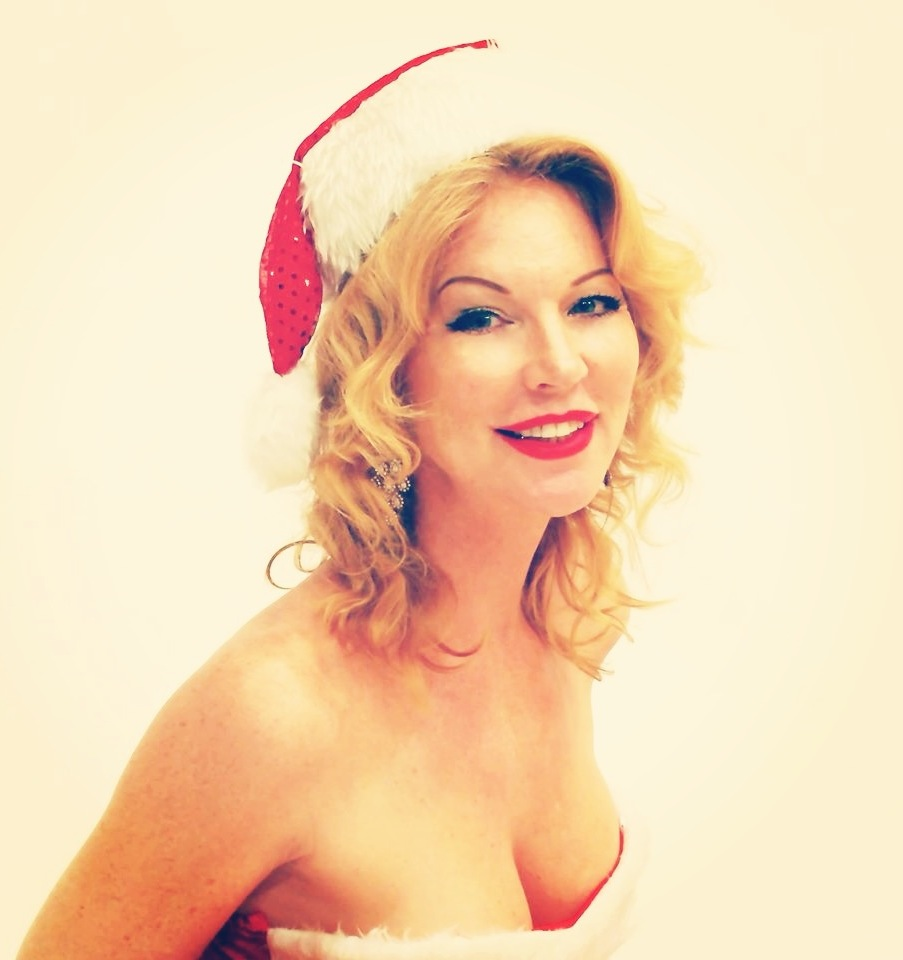

Background information
- Born: San Fernando Valley, Los Angeles, United States
- Genre: Pop
- Occupations: Singer, actress
- Website: www.cynthiabasinet.com

Cynthia Basinet is an American actress and singer, born in the San Fernando Valley in Los Angeles. She is also noted for being a friend and lover of Jack Nicholson.

== Career ==
She started as a model for I. Magnin and later became a model for Bob Mackie. After that, she worked in a San Francisco modeling agency. She spent the next five years in Europe modeling, including campaigns for Benetton with photographer, Oliviero Toscani. In the 1990s, she starred in the movies Last Dance, The Making of a Hollywood Madam, A Hard Death, and has also appeared in the "Last Man on Earth" segment of the Beyond Belief: Fact or Fiction TV series.

Basinet released her first album, For You With Love in 2001 under the name "C. Basinet". It included "Santa Baby", which was originally recorded as a gift to actor Jack Nicholson in 1997. In 2006, she released her first full-length album, The Collection, which contains a decade of songs that she had recorded as singles for Dreamsville, including "Santa Baby," "Haunted Heart", "Water's Edge", and "God." In 2007, she released a tenth anniversary version of "Santa Baby".

=== Filmography ===
| Year | Title | Episode | Role |
|---|---|---|---|
| 2014 | Blue Gold: American Jeans | | Herself |
| 2011 | Onion SportsDome (TV series) | Episode #1.4 (2011) | Cheryl |
| 1999 | The Big Tease | | Hotel Clerk (uncredited) |
| 1997 | Beyond Belief: Fact or Fiction (TV series) | Last Man on Earth (1997); The Prophecy; Couch Potato; Love over the Counter; Imaginary Friend | |
| 1996 | A Hard Death (video) | | Leslie Miller |
| 1996 | The Making of a Hollywood Madam (TV movie) | | Caroline |
| 1992 | Last Dance | | Jamie (as Cynthia Stanton) |
| 1991 | The Bold and the Beautiful (TV series) | Episode #1.1161 (1991) | |

=== Discography ===
| Year | Album |
|---|---|
| 2011 | "The Christmas Song" (single) |
| 2010 | Remixed |
| 2007 | "Santa Baby" (10th Anniversary Edition) (single) |
| 2007 | Uncovered |
| 2006 | The Collection |
| 2001 | For You with Love |
