= Live with Regis and Kelly season 24 =

Yes	denotes that a particular segment WAS aired.
No	denotes that a particular segment WAS NOT aired.
- denotes a "Special Week" (usually a week in which the show is taken on location)
- denotes a "Special Episode"
- denotes a "Theme Week"

This is a list of Live! with Regis and Kelly and Live! with Kelly episodes which were broadcast during the show's 24th season. The list is ordered by air date.

Although the co-hosts may have read a couple of emails during the broadcast, it does not necessarily count as an "Inbox" segment.

== LIVE! with Regis and Kelly ==
=== September 2011 ===
Date	Co-Hosts	"Host Chat"	Guests/Segments	"Regis and Kelly Inbox"
September 5	Regis Philbin & Kelly Ripa	Yes	Hank Azaria, Kevin Connolly and "Real Housewives of Beverly Hills"	No
September 6	Regis Philbin & Kelly Ripa	Yes	Stephen Moyer and Rachel Zoe	No
September 7	Regis Philbin & Kelly Ripa	Yes	Matt Damon and La La and Carmello Anthony	No
September 8	Regis Philbin & Kelly Ripa	Yes	Salma Hayek and Joe Jonas	No
September 9	Kelly Ripa & Seth Meyers	Yes	Lauren Graham, Kara DioGuardi and "Swamp Brothers" Stephen and Robbie Keszey	No
September 12	Regis Philbin & Kelly Ripa	Yes	Greg Kinnear, Paul Wesley, Guinness World Record Breaker Week	Yes
September 13	Regis Philbin & Kelly Ripa	Yes	Sarah Michelle Gellar, Diane Sawyer, Guinness World Record Breaker Week	No
September 14	Regis Philbin & Kelly Ripa	Yes	Pierce Brosnan, Meredith Vieira, Guinness World Record Breaker Week	No
September 15	Regis Philbin & Kelly Ripa	Yes	Zooey Deschanel, Tim Gunn, Guinness World Record Breaker Week	No
September 16	Kelly Ripa & Andy Cohen	Yes	James Marsden, Gavin Degraw, Guinness World Record Breaker Week	No
September 19	Regis Philbin & Kelly Ripa	Yes	Tom Selleck, Eddie Cibrian and Lawrence Zarian	No
September 20	Regis Philbin & Kelly Ripa	Yes	Julianna Margulies, Paula Abdul and Anna Kournikova	No
September 21	Regis Philbin & Kelly Ripa	Yes	Jonah Hill, Jane Lynch and Kelly Monaco	No
September 22	Regis Philbin & Kelly Ripa	Yes	Taylor Lautner, Celine Dion and Minka Kelly	No
September 23	Kelly Ripa & Dana Carvey	Yes	Elizabeth Hurley, Christina Ricci and Marc Santa Maria	No
September 26	Regis Philbin & Kelly Ripa	Yes	Melissa McCarthy, Cloris Leachman and Blake Shelton	No
September 27	Regis Philbin & Kelly Ripa	Yes	Taye Diggs, Morgan Freeman and Colbie Caillat	No
September 28	Regis Philbin & Kelly Ripa	Yes	Ted Danson, Anna Faris and Allstar Weekend	No
September 29	Regis Philbin & Kelly Ripa	Yes	Claire Danes, Alton Brown and Jason Derulo	No
September 30	Kelly Ripa & Mark Consuelos	Yes	Brooke Shields and Rob Mariano	No

=== October 2011 ===
Date	Co-Hosts	"Host Chat"	Guests/Segments	"Regis and Kelly Inbox"
October 3	Regis Philbin & Kelly Ripa	Yes	Tim McGraw, Dana Delany	Yes
October 4	Regis Philbin & Kelly Ripa	Yes	Hugh Jackman, Kaley Cuoco, Scotty McCreery	No
October 5	Regis Philbin & Kelly Ripa	Yes	Simon Cowell, Sugar Ray Leonard, Dr. Greg Yapalater	No
October 6	Regis Philbin & Kelly Ripa	Yes	George Clooney, Rachel Bilson	No
October 7	Kelly Ripa & Carson Kressley	Yes	Madeleine Stowe, Emilio Estevez, Martin Sheen	No
October 10	Kelly Ripa & Larry the Cable Guy	Yes	Evan Rachel Wood, "The Situation", Co-Host Cook-Off Week	No
October 11	Kelly Ripa & Katie Couric	Yes	Dylan McDermott, Anna Torv, Co-Host Cook-Off Week	No
October 12	Kelly Ripa & Michael Strahan	Yes	Chace Crawford, Jewel, Co-Host Cook-Off Week	No
October 13	Kelly Ripa & Jerry O'Connell	Yes	Taylor Swift, Lauren Alaina, Co-Host Cook-Off Week	No
October 14	Kelly Ripa & Mark Feuerstein	Yes	David Boreanaz, Zachary Quinto, Co-Host Cook-Off Week	No
October 17	Regis Philbin & Kelly Ripa	Yes	Simon Baker, Jessica Capshaw	No
October 18	Regis Philbin & Kelly Ripa	Yes	Kevin Spacey, Disney FamilyFun Magazine: Top Toys	No
October 19	Regis Philbin & Kelly Ripa	Yes	Ricky Gervais, Penn Badgley	No
October 20	Regis Philbin & Kelly Ripa	Yes	Kelsey Grammer, Carrot Top	No
October 21	Kelly Ripa & Josh Groban	Yes	Orlando Bloom, Ginnifer Goodwin, Largest Pumpkin	No
October 24	Regis Philbin & Kelly Ripa	Yes	Matthew Broderick, LeAnn Rimes, Halloween Flashback	No
October 25	Regis Philbin & Kelly Ripa	Yes	Téa Leoni, Halloween Creatures	No
October 26	Regis Philbin & Kelly Ripa	Yes	Salma Hayek, Kids of LIVE Halloween Fashion Show	No
October 27	Regis Philbin & Kelly Ripa	Yes	Eva Longoria, Nicole Polizzi	No
October 28	Regis Philbin & Kelly Ripa	Yes	Nightmares Fear Factory, Judge Judy	No
October 31	Kelly Ripa & Nick Lachey	No	Halloween Headliner's Ball	No

=== November 2011 ===
Date	Co-Hosts	"Host Chat"	Guests/Segments	"Regis and Kelly Inbox"
November 1	Regis Philbin & Kelly Ripa	Yes	Brian Williams, Char Margolis, So Wrong, So Right Week	No
November 2	Regis Philbin & Kelly Ripa	Yes	Billy Bob Thornton, Miranda Lambert, So Wrong, So Right Week	No
November 3	Regis Philbin & Kelly Ripa	Yes	Eddie Murphy, So Wrong, So Right Week	No
November 4	Regis Philbin & Kelly Ripa	Yes	Michael J. Fox, So Wrong, So Right Week	No
November 7	Regis Philbin & Kelly Ripa	Yes	Michael Bublé, Regis's Farewell Celebration, Surprise Guest Robert De Niro	No
November 8	Regis Philbin & Kelly Ripa	Yes	Katie Holmes, Peter Facinelli, Regis's Farewell Celebration, Surprise Guest Michael Douglas	No
November 9	Regis Philbin & Kelly Ripa	Yes	Taylor Lautner, People's Choice Awards, Regis's Farewell Celebration, Surprise Guest Liam Neeson	No
November 10	Regis Philbin & Kelly Ripa	Yes	Robert Pattinson, Regis's Farewell Celebration, Surprise Guest Lou Holtz	No
November 11	Regis Philbin & Kelly Ripa	Yes	Adam Sandler, Regis's Farewell Celebration, Surprise Guest Joy Philbin	No
November 14	Regis Philbin & Kelly Ripa	Yes	Jimmy Fallon, Don Rickles, LIVE's Ultimate Fan	No
November 15	Regis Philbin & Kelly Ripa	Yes	Donald Trump, Tony Bennett	No
November 16	Regis Philbin & Kelly Ripa	Yes	David Letterman, Bret Michaels	No
November 17	Regis Philbin & Kelly Ripa	Yes	Kathie Lee Gifford, Josh Groban	No
November 18	Regis Philbin & Kelly Ripa	No	Regis's Final Show	No

== LIVE! with Kelly (2011-2012) ==
=== November 2011 ===
Date	Guest Co-Host	"Host Chat"	Guests/Segments	"Kelly's Inbox"
November 21	Jerry Seinfeld	Yes	LIVE! with Kelly Premiere Episode, Jason Segel	No
November 22	Jerry Seinfeld	Yes	Kim Cattrall, Tony Stewart, Jamie Oliver	No
November 23	Jerry Seinfeld	Yes	Howie Mandel, Miss Piggy, Holiday Gift Ideas	No
November 25	Jerry O'Connell	Yes	Nathan Fillion, Jane Lynch, Josh Capon	No
November 28	Neil Patrick Harris	Yes	Angie Harmon, Avril Lavigne	Yes
November 29	Neil Patrick Harris	Yes	Betty White, Molly Sims, Cobra Starship featuring Sabi	No
November 30	Neil Patrick Harris	Yes	Jaime Pressly, Kristen Johnston, Hot Chelle Rae	No

=== December 2011 ===
Date	Guest Co-Host	"Host Chat"	Guests/Segments	"Kelly's Inbox"
December 1	Neil Patrick Harris	Yes	Marcia Cross, Science Bob	No
December 2	Neil Patrick Harris	Yes	Maya Rudolph, Matt Czuchry	Yes
December 5	Derek Hough	Yes	Jeffrey Donovan, Elizabeth Olsen, LIVE's Holiday Feast Week	No
December 6	Jonah Hill	Yes	Sarah Jessica Parker, Emily VanCamp, LIVE's Holiday Feast Week	No
December 7	Josh Groban	Yes	Zac Efron, LIVE's Holiday Feast Week	No
December 8	Josh Groban	Yes	Jessica Biel, LIVE's Holiday Feast Week	Yes
December 9	Josh Groban	Yes	Charlize Theron, Abigail Breslin, Cody Simpson, LIVE's Holiday Feast Week	No
December 12	Taye Diggs	Yes	David Hyde Pierce, The Amazing Race Winners, Holiday Gift Guide - Chris Byrne	No
December 13	Kevin Jonas	Yes	Michelle Pfeiffer, Anthony Hamilton, Holiday Gift Guide - Matt Bean	No
December 14	Bryant Gumbel	Yes	Jude Law, The Biggest Loser Winner, Rachel Crow, Holiday Gift Guide - Lawrence Zarian	Yes
December 15	Michael Bublé	Yes	Robert Downey, Jr., Lady Antebellum, Holiday Gift Guide - David Pogue	No
December 16	Michael Bublé	Yes	Daniel Craig, Holiday Gift Guide - Kelly	No
December 19	Mark Consuelos	Yes	Rooney Mara, Disney on Ice, Lady Antebellum	No
December 20	Mark Consuelos	Yes	LIVE's Home for the Holidays Special, Scarlett Johansson, Radio City Rockettes, Joaquin Consuelos, Voca People	No
December 23	Mark Consuelos	Yes	LIVE's Holiday Memories Special	No

=== January 2012 ===
Date	Guest Co-Host	"Host Chat"	Guests/Segments	"Kelly's Inbox"
January 2	Mark Consuelos	Yes	Tyra Banks, Ben Flajnik, New Year's Fitness Week - Turbo Kick	No
January 3	Jim Parsons	Yes	William H. Macy, Isaac Mizrahi, New Year's Fitness Week - P90X	No
January 4	David Duchovny	Yes	Terrence Howard, New Year's Fitness Week - Brooke Burke	Yes
January 5	Rob Lowe	Yes	Darren Criss, New Year's Fitness Week - Zumba	No
January 6	Rob Lowe	Yes	Kristen Bell, Jennifer Morrison, New Year's Fitness Week - TRX Suspension Training	No
January 9	Reggie Bush	Yes	Mark Wahlberg, Meal Makeover Week - Jorge Cruise	No
January 10	Carl Edwards	Yes	Kate Beckinsale, Laura Prepon, Meal Makeover Week - Tanya Zuckerbrot	No
January 11	Boomer Esiason	Yes	Jane Krakowski, Mike "The Situation" Sorrentino, Meal Makeover Week - Melina Jampolis	No
January 12	Jesse Palmer	Yes	Dolly Parton, Miranda Cosgrove, Meal Makeover Week - Wendy Bazilian, Lucy the World's Smallest Working Dog, LIVE's Hawaiian Dream Wedding Giveaway Finalists	No
January 13	Apolo Anton Ohno	Yes	Lana Parrilla, Common, Meal Makeover Week - Heidi Skolnik	No
January 16	Seth Meyers	Yes	Simon Baker, Kevin Hart, LIVE's Hawaiian Dream Wedding Giveaway Week	No
January 17	Seth Meyers	Yes	Jessica Alba, Matt Bomer, LIVE's Hawaiian Dream Wedding Giveaway Week	Yes
January 18	Mario Lopez	Yes	Marg Helgenberger, Mark Feuerstein, LIVE's Hawaiian Dream Wedding Giveaway Week	No
January 19	Dana Carvey	Yes	Ewan McGregor, Elizabeth Banks, LIVE's Hawaiian Dream Wedding Giveaway Week	No
January 20	Dana Carvey	Yes	Carla Gugino, Building a Better Toolbox, LIVE's Hawaiian Dream Wedding Giveaway Week	No
January 23	Kim Kardashian	Yes	Lucy Lawless, Kevin McHale, Peter Gros' Animals, Announcement of LIVE's Hawaiian Dream Wedding Winners	No
January 24	Mary J. Blige	Yes	Cynthia Nixon, Chris Harrison	No
January 25	Kristin Chenoweth	Yes	Alan Cumming, Emmy Rossum, Ingrid Michaelson	No
January 26	Cat Deeley	Yes	Nick Jonas, Rachael Ray	Yes
January 27	Carrie Ann Inaba	Yes	Chelsea Handler, Winter Health Tips for Dogs, Check-In with Las Vegas GNO	No
January 30	Dan Abrams	Yes	Channing Tatum, Announcement of Girl's Night Out: New York Edition Winners	Yes
January 31	Daniel Radcliffe	Yes	Rachel McAdams, Preview of The Women in Black, Carson Kressley with Winners of LIVE's Hawaiian Dream Wedding Giveaway	No

=== February 2012 ===
Date	Guest Co-Host	"Host Chat"	Guests/Segments	"Kelly's Inbox"
February 1	Howie Mandel	Yes	Jennifer Lopez, Girls' Generation, Preview of Mobbed, Kelly's GNO: New York Edition	No
February 2	Peter Facinelli	Yes	Michelle Williams, Nicole Polizzi & Jenni Farley, Kelly's GNO: New York Edition	Yes
February 3	D. L. Hughley	Yes	Ashley Greene, Leo Laporte, Kelly's GNO: New York Edition Recap	No
February 6	Derek Hough	Yes	Debra Messing, Atticus Shaffer, Sally Hogshead	No
February 7	Michael Strahan	Yes	Sarah Michelle Gellar, Michael Weatherly	Yes
February 8	Michael Strahan	Yes	Denzel Washington, Justin Tuck, Vanessa Hudgens	No
February 9	Jerry O'Connell	Yes	Ryan Reynolds, Sammi Giancola & Deena Cortese	No
February 10	Jerry O'Connell	Yes	Dwayne Johnson, Rebecca Romijn, ReallyWed vs. NearlyWed	No
February 13	Randy Jackson	Yes	Reese Witherspoon, Katharine McPhee	No
February 14	Randy Jackson	Yes	Idris Elba, Christina Perri, DC Cupcakes	No
February 15	Tony Potts	Yes	Ricky Martin & Nicki Minaj, Khloé Kardashian	No
February 16	Josh Groban	Yes	Tracy Morgan, Paul DelVecchio, Ronnie Ortiz-Magro & Vinny Guadagnino	No
February 17	Josh Groban	Yes	Nicolas Cage, Chris Byrne, Wedding Gown Shopping with Carson Kressley	No
February 20	Daniel Dae Kim	Yes	LIVE! at Aulani in Hawaii: Jon Cryer, Kelly goes Whale-Watching with Carson Kressley, Derek Hough dances with the Wedding Couple	No
February 21	Matthew Morrison	Yes	LIVE! at Aulani in Hawaii: Jorge Garcia, Kelly and Matthew get a Hula Lesson, Tour of Pearl Harbor, Wedding Preview	No
February 22	Carrie Ann Inaba	Yes	LIVE! at Aulani in Hawaii: Patricia Heaton, Carson Kressley, Tastes of Hawaii, Rehearsal Dinner Preview	No
February 23	Mark Consuelos	Yes	LIVE! at Aulani in Hawaii: Rico Rodriguez, Cobra Starship, Hawaiian Wedding Traditions, Mark takes the wedding party surfing	No
February 24	Mark Consuelos	Yes	LIVE! at Aulani in Hawaii: LIVE's Hawaiian Dream Wedding including Colbie Caillat	No
February 27	Neil Patrick Harris	Yes	LIVE! with Kelly After Oscar Show: Octavia Spencer, Jean Dujardin, The Cast of The Artist, Isaac Mizrahi, Maria Menounos, Lawrence Zarian, Uggie	No
February 28	Lucy Liu	Yes	Kristin Chenoweth, Poppy Montgomery, Hawaiian Dream Wedding Reception, Nokia Phone Giveaway	No
February 29	Alec Baldwin	Yes	Larry the Cable Guy, Taylor Kitsch, Leaping Animals from SeaWorld and Busch Gardens	No

=== March 2012 ===
Date	Guest Co-Host	"Host Chat"	Guests/Segments	"Kelly's Inbox"
March 1	Dan Abrams	Yes	Don Cheadle, Ben McKenzie, 5-Minute Mug Cake	No
March 2	Dan Abrams	Yes	Anjelica Huston, Donnie Wahlberg	Yes
March 5	Nick Lachey	Yes	Kristin Davis, Alison Sweeney, Spring Cleaning Week - Kristin Van Ogtrop, A Big Announcement	No
March 6	Nick Lachey	Yes	Fran Drescher, Chris Paul, Spring Cleaning Week - Stephen Fanuka	No
March 7	Pat Kiernan	Yes	Willem Dafoe, Leslie Bibb, Spring Cleaning Week - Carley Roney	No
March 8	Martin Short	Yes	Ewan McGregor, Spring Cleaning Week - Katie Brown	No
March 9	Martin Short	Yes	Kathy Bates, Big Time Rush, Spring Cleaning Week - Viewer Tips	No
March 12	Kyle MacLachlan	Yes	Nicole Richie, Cee Lo Green, Jeremy Rosado	Yes
March 13	Mark Consuelos	Yes	Will Ferrell, Elle Macpherson, Lindzi Cox, Mark in I Hate My Teenage Daughter	No
March 14	Michael Strahan	Yes	Susan Sarandon, Jeremy Sisto	Yes
March 15	Michael Strahan	Yes	Ashley Judd, Whitney Cummings	Yes
March 16	Michael Strahan	Yes	John Larroquette, Mary McCormack	No
March 19	Nick Lachey	Yes	Ice Cube, Joan Collins, Jennifer Goldstein	No
March 26	Jerry O'Connell	Yes	Kate Winslet, Lily Collins	No

=== April 2012 ===
Date	Guest Co-Host	"Host Chat"	Guests/Segments	"Kelly's Inbox"
April 2	Mark Consuelos	Yes	LIVE! in Banff, Alberta: Jason Biggs, Heejun Han, Scott Harrison, Mark goes Dogsledding	No
April 3	Chris Harrison	Yes	LIVE! in Banff, Alberta: Caroline Rhea, Jayma Mays, Far East Movement, The Calgary Fiddlers, Gelman goes Catskiing	No
April 4	Peter Facinelli	Yes	LIVE! in Banff, Alberta: Johnny Galecki, Melanie Fiona, Kelly goes Snowshoeing	No
April 5	Ben Mulroney	Yes	LIVE! in Banff, Alberta: David James Elliott, Chef Martin Luthi, Kelly goes Torchlight Skiing	No
April 9	Howie Mandel	Yes	Sofía Vergara, L.A. Reid, DeAndre Brackensick, Debut of LIVE's New Set, House DJ Week - Samantha Ronson	No
April 10	Howie Mandel	Yes	Christina Applegate, Gabourey Sidibe, House DJ Week - DJ Pauly D	No
April 11	Carson Kressley	Yes	Cheryl Hines, Monica & Brandy, New York International Auto Show, House DJ Week - DJ Cassidy	No
April 12	Joel McHale	Yes	Laura Linney, Bradley Whitford, New York International Auto Show - Wow! Cars, House DJ Week - Chrissie Miller	No
April 13	Joel McHale	Yes	John Slattery, Martha Plimpton, New York International Auto Show - SUVs, House DJ Week - DJ Twist	No
April 16	D. L. Hughley	Yes	Ice T, Paul Wesley	Yes
April 17	D. L. Hughley	Yes	Julia Louis-Dreyfus, Ronnie Wood, Jane Goodall	No
April 18	Mike Greenberg	Yes	Olivia Wilde, Kevin Hart, Science Bob	No
April 19	Seth Meyers	Yes	Zac Efron, Ana Gasteyer, Karina Smirnoff and Gavin DeGraw	No
April 20	Seth Meyers	Yes	Candice Bergen, Eva LaRue, Peter Gros	Yes
April 23	Jesse Palmer	Yes	Kate Walsh, Colton Dixon, 5-Minute French Toast	No
April 24	Jesse Palmer	Yes	Hugh Grant, Blair Underwood, Latest Prom Trends	No
April 25	Mario Lopez	Yes	Kathleen Turner, James Van Der Beek, Ashanti	Yes
April 26	Matthew Broderick	Yes	Jenna Fischer, Garry Marshall, Katherine Jenkins and Mark Ballas	No
April 27	Mark Consuelos	Yes	Maggie Q, Daughtry, Announcement of LIVE's Top Teacher Search Finalists	Yes
April 30	Pat Kiernan	Yes	Donald Trump, Elise Testone, Face Yoga	Yes

=== May 2012 ===
Date	Guest Co-Host	"Host Chat"	Guests/Segments	"Kelly's Inbox"
May 1	Pat Kiernan	Yes	Daniel Dae Kim, Samantha Ronson, Guide to Sunglasses, Top 5 Finalists in LIVE's Top Teacher Search	No
May 2	Josh Groban	Yes	Mark Ruffalo, Lisa Rinna, Jeremy Britt	No
May 3	Josh Groban	Yes	Sissy Spacek, Beth Behrs	Yes
May 4	Ben Mulroney	Yes	Nathan Fillion, Chef Aarón Sánchez, William Polley	No
May 7	Michael Strahan	Yes	Cameron Diaz, Skylar Laine, Money for Moms Week	No
May 8	Michael Strahan	Yes	Stephen Colbert, Miss USA 2012 Contestants, Money for Moms Week	No
May 9	Michael Strahan	Yes	Chace Crawford, Karmin, Money for Moms Week	Yes
May 10	Nick Lachey	Yes	Ginnifer Goodwin, Roshon Fegan & Chelsie Hightower, Money for Moms Week	Yes
May 11	Nick Lachey	Yes	Felicity Huffman, Vanessa Lachey, Kip Moore, Money for Moms Week	No
May 14	Jimmy Kimmel	Yes	Chris Colfer, Hollie Cavanagh, Top Teacher Week - Danielle Greco	No
May 15	Sam Champion	Yes	LL Cool J, James Morrison, Top Teacher Week - Wendy Martin	No
May 16	Chris Harrison	Yes	Billy Bob Thornton, Eli Manning, Top Teacher Week - Monica Dunn	No
May 17	Chris Harrison	Yes	Christina Hendricks, Maria Menounos & Derek Hough, Top Teacher Week - Bryan Sawyer	Yes
May 18	Reggie Bush	Yes	Tom Selleck, Krysten Ritter, Top Teacher Week - Kristin Golia	No
May 21	Taye Diggs	Yes	Robin Thicke, Emily Maynard, Chad Qian	No
May 22	L. A. Reid	Yes	Jimmy Fallon, Kris Allen, Announcement of Top Teacher Week Winner	Yes
May 23	Seth Meyers	Yes	Josh Brolin, Donald Driver & Peta Murgatroyd	Yes
May 24	Seth Meyers	Yes	Kevin Costner, Katherine Jenkins & Mark Ballas, William Levy & Cheryl Burke	Yes
May 25	Seth Meyers	Yes	Bill Paxton, Judith Light, Road Trip Car Games	No
May 28	Mark Consuelos	Yes	Jim Parsons, Pawn Stars, Outdoor Games	No
May 29	Ed Robertson	Yes	Amy Brenneman, Jessica Sanchez	Yes
May 30	Martin Short	Yes	Melissa Joan Hart, Joshua Ledet, Clip from Madagascar 3	No
May 31	Mike Greenberg	Yes	Kristen Stewart, Bill Hader	Yes

=== June 2012 ===
Date	Guest Co-Host	"Host Chat"	Guests/Segments	"Kelly's Inbox"
June 1	Mike Greenberg	Yes	Chris Hemsworth, Cirque du Soleil's Zarkana, Grilling with the Stars - Joey Lawrence	No
June 4	Bryant Gumbel	Yes	Cat Deeley, Gavin DeGraw, Snigdha Nandipati	No
June 5	Bryant Gumbel	Yes	Jenny McCarthy, Olivia Culpo, Healthy Grilling Tips	No
June 6	Neil Patrick Harris	Yes	Julianne Hough, Kerry Washington, Animal Super Dads from SeaWorld and Busch Gardens	No
June 7	Neil Patrick Harris	Yes	Jessica Chastain, Emeli Sandé, Chris Byrne	No
June 8	Andy Samberg	Yes	Chris Rock, Patrick Duffy, Grilling with the Stars - Marilu Henner, Clip from That's My Boy	No
June 11	Jerry O'Connell	Yes	Noah Wyle, Bristol Palin, Summer Dog Care Tips	No
June 12	Jerry O'Connell	Yes	Ben Stiller, Michael Ealy, Grilling with the Stars - Raven-Symoné	No
June 18	Bryant Gumbel	Yes	Michelle Obama, Marc Forgione, Cary Family YMCA Superskippers	No
June 19	Nick Lachey	Yes	Mary J. Blige, Mark Feuerstein, Rita Wilson, Cat Cora	No
June 25	Carrie Ann Inaba	Yes	Chris Pine, Andy Cohen, Blues Traveler	No
June 26	Tyler Perry	Yes	Emma Stone, Joe Manganiello, Chris Bosh, Psychic Week - Sylvia Browne	Yes
June 27	Michael Strahan	Yes	Andrew Garfield, Seth MacFarlane, Psychic Week - Theresa Caputo	No
June 28	Michael Strahan	Yes	Channing Tatum, Carly Rae Jepsen, Psychic Week - Char Margolis	No
June 29	Michael Strahan	Yes	Matthew McConaughey, Grilling with the Stars - Ashanti, Psychic Week - Sonya Fitzpatrick	No

=== July 2012 ===
Date	Guest Co-Host	"Host Chat"	Guests/Segments	"Kelly's Inbox"
July 2	Michael Strahan	Yes	Sally Field, Exotic Rainforest Animals from San Diego Zoo	Yes
July 3	Michael Strahan	Yes	John Travolta, will.i.am & Eva Simons	Yes
July 4	Kevin Jonas	Yes	LIVE's 4 July Party: Blake Lively, Cody Simpson, LIVE's Independence Day Games	No
July 5	Carrie Ann Inaba	Yes	Salma Hayek, Rhys Ifans	Yes
July 6	Mark Feuerstein	Yes	Rose Byrne, Grilling with the Stars - Caroline Manzo	Yes
July 9	Seth Meyers	Yes	Kyra Sedgwick, Eric McCormack, Date Night Makeover Week	No
July 10	Seth Meyers	Yes	Matt Bomer, Allison Williams, Date Night Makeover Week	Yes
July 11	Seth Meyers	Yes	Glenn Close, Elijah Wood, Date Night Makeover Week	Yes
July 12	Seth Meyers	Yes	Anne Hathaway, John Leguizamo, Date Night Makeover Week	Yes
July 13	Seth Meyers	Yes	Ray Romano, Grilling with the Stars - Kristen Johnston, Date Night Makeover Week	No
July 16	Josh Groban	Yes	Kristin Davis, LIVE's Coast-to-Coast Co-Host Search Challenge #1	Yes
July 17	Josh Groban	Yes	Gary Oldman, Nicole Polizzi & Jenni Farley, LIVE's Coast-to-Coast Co-Host Search Challenge #2	Yes
July 18	Josh Groban	Yes	Jesse Metcalfe, Victor Cruz, LIVE's Coast-to-Coast Co-Host Search Challenge #3	No
July 19	Jerry O'Connell	Yes	Heidi Klum, LIVE's Coast-to-Coast Co-Host Search Challenge #4	No
July 20	Rob Thomas	Yes	John Stamos, Grilling with the Stars - Carla Gugino, LIVE's Coast-to-Coast Co-Host Search Challenges #5 & #6	No
July 23	Mark Consuelos	Yes	Vince Vaughn, Grilling with the Stars - Mike "The Situation" Sorrentino	No
July 24	Michael Buckley	Yes	Will Ferrell, Emily Maynard, Andrew Zimmern	Yes
July 25	Joel McHale	Yes	Zach Galifianakis, John Rich	Yes
July 26	Joel McHale	Yes	Dylan McDermott, Josh Henderson	Yes
July 27	Joel McHale	Yes	Olivia Munn, Grilling with the Stars - Lou Diamond Phillips, Skipper Bivins & Trent Jackson	No
July 30	Chris Harrison	Yes	Jeremy Renner, Zachary Gordon, Diet Week - Dr. William Davis	No
July 31	Chris Harrison	Yes	Rachel Weisz, Diet Week - Dr. Mark Hyman	No

=== August 2012 ===
Date	Guest Co-Host	"Host Chat"	Guests/Segments	"Kelly's Inbox"
August 1	Nick Lachey	Yes	Carson Kressley, Joss Stone, Diet Week - Dr. Mike Moreno	Yes
August 2	Nick Lachey	Yes	Caroline Rhea, Joey Fatone, Diet Week - Dr. Joel Fuhrman	Yes
August 3	Nick Lachey	Yes	Amy Adams, Vanessa L. Williams, Marilu Henner wins Grilling with the Stars, Diet Week - Dr. Arthur Agatston	Yes
August 13	Carrie Ann Inaba	Yes	Lisa Kudrow, Larry Hagman	No
August 14	Chris Harrison	Yes	Jordin Sparks, Dr. Greg Yapalater	No
August 20	Nick Lachey	Yes	Shia LaBeouf, Tim Gunn	No
