= Married to Jonas =

Television series

- Genre: Reality television
- Starring: Kevin Jonas; Danielle Jonas
- Country of origin: United States
- No. of seasons: 2
- No. of episodes: 16

Production
- Executive producers: Adam Sher; Ryan Seacrest; Stephanie Bloch Chambers
- Camera setup: Multiple
- Running time: 20 to 23 minutes
- Production company: Ryan Seacrest Productions

Original release
- Network: E!
- Release: August 19, 2012 – May 26, 2013

Married to Jonas is an American reality documentary television series on E! that debuted on August 19, 2012. It primarily focuses on Kevin Jonas, the eldest of the Jonas Brothers and his married life with his wife Danielle Jonas. However, the first season also focused on the 2012 "comeback" of the Jonas Brothers.

In November 2012, E! announced that the series was renewed for a second season, which premiered April 21, 2013. The second season follows the couple as the Jonas Brothers finish their would-be fifth studio album and head back on their final United States tour after three years in hiatus, before the unexpected breakup of the band. Dani also jump-starts her own business endeavors by opening her own business in New Jersey and the Jonas and Deleasa families become closer. The show was cancelled after the end of the second season.

== Cast ==
=== Main ===
- Kevin Jonas Jr.
- Danielle "Dani" Deleasa Jonas

=== Recurring ===
- Kevin Jonas Sr.
- Denise Jonas
- Joe Jonas
- Nick Jonas
- Frankie Jonas
- Bucky Deleasa
- Angela Deleasa
- Dina Deleasa Gonsar
- Michael "Mikey" Deleasa
- Kathleen "Katie" Deleasa
- Brian Gonsar

== Episodes ==
=== Series overview ===
| Season | Episodes | Originally released | |
| Season | Episodes | First released | Last released |
|---|---|---|---|
| 1 | 10 | August 19, 2012 | October 28, 2012 |
| 2 | 6 | April 21, 2013 | May 26, 2013 |

=== Season 1 (2012) ===
| No. overall | No. in season | Title | Original release date | U.S. viewers (millions) |
|---|---|---|---|---|
| 1 | 1 | "Dinner with the In-Laws" | August 19, 2012 | 1.73 |
Dani is surprised when Kevin volunteers her to cook dinner for the whole Jonas family.
| 2 | 2 | "Prom Night with the In-Laws" | August 26, 2012 | 1.99 |
Dani's family is worried about their youngest daughter going too far on prom night. Kevin helps Bucky accept that his little girl is growing up.
| 3 | 3 | "Texas With the In-Laws" | September 2, 2012 | 1.79 |
Kevin and Dani fly down to the Jonas' Texas house, and Kevin's mother pressures them to have a child.
| 4 | 4 | "In-Law-tervention" | September 9, 2012 | 1.48 |
The family holds an intervention to discuss Bucky's unhealthy lifestyle. Kevin tries a few home-improvement projects.
| 5 | 5 | "Emergency In-Law" | September 16, 2012 | 2.21 |
The Jonas brothers award their father with a trophy for Father of the Year. Kevin later co-hosts Live! with Kelly and receives nerve racking news related to Dani.
| 6 | 6 | "In-Laws & In-Studio" | September 30, 2012 | 1.03 |
Kevin is tired after a long day in the studio and snaps at Dani. Dani works hard planning her sister's graduation festivities.
| 7 | 7 | "In-Laws & Outdoors" | October 7, 2012 | 0.80 |
Dani and Kevin get unexpected reactions after they announce some news while camping with the family.
| 8 | 8 | "Italy With the In-Laws: Part One" | October 14, 2012 | 0.76 |
The family takes a trip to Italy, but the mood completely changes when there's an unexpected phone call and a secret.
| 9 | 9 | "Italy With the In-Laws: Part Two" | October 21, 2012 | 0.72 |
Kevin unexpectedly has to depart from Italy which leaves Dani alone to endure questions related to her health from Dina.
| 10 | 10 | "When In-Laws Collide" | October 28, 2012 | 0.95 |
The Jonas and Deleasa families spend time together. Kevin, and his brothers work hard in the studio to record a new song for their upcoming album.

=== Season 2 (2013) ===
| No. overall | No. in season | Title | Original release date | U.S. viewers (millions) |
|---|---|---|---|---|
| 11 | 1 | "Escape to New York" | April 21, 2013 | 0.99 |
Kevin tries to convince Dani on the idea of moving to New York City. Mikey makes a surprise announcement.
| 12 | 2 | "Pom Pom's and Circumstance" | April 28, 2013 | 0.61 |
Kevin, Joe, and Nick take a trip down to Louisiana while Dani completes her photo shoot and solves family issues.
| 13 | 3 | "The New Dani" | May 5, 2013 | 0.71 |
Dani is offered the chance to write a column for a magazine. Mikey receives an offer that he can't refuse.
| 14 | 4 | "Fandemonium" | May 12, 2013 | 0.74 |
Kevin and the Jonas Brothers begin the South American leg of their 2012/2013 World Tour while Dani begins working with Cosmo.
| 15 | 5 | "Los Jonas Hermanos" | May 19, 2013 | 0.57 |
Joe is worried that Mikey's anxiousness is bringing him down. Meanwhile, Dani's newest career puts a dampener on her trip plans.
| 16 | 6 | "Lights, Camera, Cosmo" | May 26, 2013 | 0.67 |
Dani's upcoming photo shoot with Cosmopolitan is put on the line after a family problem rises. Mikey and Bucky's bond is on the rocks after some tension arises.

== Awards and nominations ==
| Year | Title | Award | Nominated work | Result |
|---|---|---|---|---|
| 2013 | Teen Choice Awards | Choice Television: Reality Show | Married to Jonas | Nominated |
| 2013 | Teen Choice Awards | Choice Television: Female Reality Star | Danielle Jonas | Nominated |
| 2013 | Teen Choice Awards | Choice Television: Male Reality Star | Kevin Jonas | Won |
