= Dan McKeown =

American record producer (born 1954)

- Born: 1954 (age 70–71)
- Genres: Rock / R&B
- Occupation: Record producer
- Years active: 42 years
- Labels: produced for BMG, CBS, Sutra, Chit, Lazar, Planet Entertainment, Power-Up Records, Worden
- Website: DanMcKeown.com

Dan McKeown (born 1954) is an American, Philadelphia-based record producer, who has gained international fame with his music and television productions. His credits include artists such as Billy Paul, The Intruders, Dee Dee Sharp, The Trammps, Frankie Smith, plus the Philly rockers Hit the Ground Runnin, and many more.

== Life and career ==
Hit the Ground Runnin's first album Sudden Impact was produced by McKeown and Paul Piccari.

McKeown also worked with long-time friend Michael Nise in Camden, New Jersey, where he was in charge of the entertainment division for the television shows Dancin' on Air and Dance Party USA. He also composed and recorded the theme songs for both shows at Powerhouse Studio, which he built and managed from 1981 through 1992. The 1983 version of the Dancin' on Air theme was released as a single on both a picture disc and 45 RPM on the Wordan label, owned by The Tonight Show's band leader Doc Severinsen, and also co-owned by the show's producer Michael Nise. His musical compositions were used on national commercials from JCPenney, Owens Corning and also made an appearance on a Bud Light commercial during the 1997 Super Bowl, in which he did an impromptu beat-box scat that was seen by millions. McKeown was also seen and heard on many television and radio commercials during the 1980s and 1990s, appearing in auto infomercials in the Philadelphia Tri-State area such as Miami Motor's, Jeff D'Ambrosio, Desimone's, and Auto Depot.

In May 1985, a two city block in Philadelphia was destroyed due to the police bombing a bunker on top of a row home on Osage Ave., occupied by the back to Africa group MOVE. Families were left homeless and in need of support for food and shelter. Looking to provide support, Nise reached out to McKeown to write and produce a song that could be sold to raise money for the victims. Within one day, McKeown penned "In the Name of Brotherly Love" and booked a week-long recording session at which over 100 artists, news and television personalities including disc jockeys and musicians from Philadelphia volunteered their talent for this project.

McKeown also worked with long time friend Billy Paul, producing such tracks as the disco version of Paul's 1972 hit song "Me and Mrs. Jones". In 2005 - 2007, McKeown produced a podcast with Paul along with his wife and soulmate Blanche Williams called "Philly Sounds and Beyond".

From 1980 through 2018, McKeown was also employed with the military division of Boeing Defense, Space & Security in Philadelphia, where he worked as a representative in Product Support and a Program Manager in New Business. He received multiple awards from the company and Army customer for his contributions in cost avoidance, creating processes that are still in use since his retirement after 38 years of service. In 1984, McKeown had mitigated an emergent issue for a couple of CH-47D aircraft in Korea, both needing Aft Pylon Assemblies with a manufacturing lead time of over two years. Knowing that similar parts from a Boeing CH-47 Chinook aircraft were being scrapped during the Chinook modernization program, McKeown found out that the scrapped parts could immediately resolve the customer's problem. McKeown's actions resulted with a successful mission, making national news including a letter from the Pentagon commending him on his support. He was also visited by Boeing's then president Mal Stamper, who presented him with a large cash award for his dedication and thinking out of the box.

Since his retirement, McKeown has been working with long time friend, Tony Bongiovi, where he is currently involved in a new and revolutionary audio technology, created by Bongiovi and his current company Bongiovi Acoustics, located in South Florida. But after spending over 45 years in the entertainment business, he still gets opportunities to produce music for movies, radio and television, while spending the other half of his time with his extended family.
