= Lola Consuelos =

American singer-songwriter and Mark Consuelos and Kelly Ripa's daughter (born 2001)

- Born: Lola Grace Consuelos; June 16, 2001 (age 25); New York, New York, U.S.
- Genres: Alternative R&B
- Years active: 2022–present

Lola Grace Consuelos (born June 16, 2001) is an American rhythm and blues singer and songwriter.

== Early life ==
Consuelos was born Lola Grace Consuelos on June 16, 2001, to actors Kelly Ripa and Mark Consuelos in New York City. Her name was inspired by the line, "Her name was Lola," from Barry Manilow's Copacabana, which was played on a radio station while her parents, Ripa and Mark Consuelos, were taking a taxi to the hospital on the way to deliver her. She attended the New York University Tisch School of the Arts and graduated in 2023.

== Musical career ==
Lola Consuelos began her music career in 2022 with the release of her debut single, Paranoia Silverlining, a pop-R&B track. The song was featured in the 2025 Pretty Thing, an American erotic thriller directed by Justin Kelly. Released in theaters on July 4, 2025, by Shout! Studios, the film stars Alicia Silverstone and Karl Glusman.

In 2023, she released her follow-up single, Divine Timing. In 2024, she released the single The Watcher. She described the music as "soulful" and "a little R&B."

Lola cites artists like Amy Winehouse, SZA, and Erykah Badu as influences.

== Discography ==
- Paranoia Silverlining (2022) – Single
- Divine Timing (2023) – Single
- Roles (2023) – Single
- The Watcher (2024) – Single
- Lola (2025) – Single
