= Jorge Cruise =

Mexican author and fitness trainer

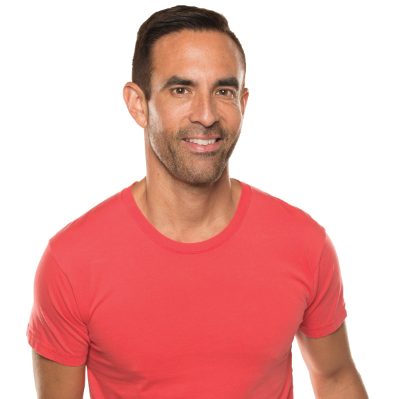
- Born: March 6, 1971 (age 55); Mexico City, Mexico
- Education: University of California, San Diego
- Occupations: Fitness trainer, author

Jorge Cruise (born March 6, 1971, in Mexico City) is a Mexican author, fitness trainer and proponent of intermittent fasting and low-carbohydrate dieting. He is the author of The Cruise Control Diet (2019) as well as books on The New York Times bestseller list: The 100 (2013), The Belly Fat Cure (2010), Body at Home (2009), The 12-Second Sequence (2009), The 3-Hour Diet (2006), and 8 Minutes in the Morning (2002).

== Career ==
Cruise began his career working for Tony Robbins and was inspired by Robbins to launch his career as a trainer. Several years later, he got his big break when Oprah Winfrey both hired him as her personal trainer and featured him on her televised show and in her magazine. Cruise has created a number of different diet plans over the last decade, his philosophy evolving over the years from heavy emphasis on increasing metabolism through building lean muscle (8 Minutes in the Morning, The 12-Second Sequence) to advocating smaller-yet-more-frequent meals (The 3-Hour Diet, Body at Home) to recommending low-carb/low-sugar meal plans (The Belly Fat Cure). His most recent work, The Cruise Control Diet, advocates a "better than keto" intermittent fasting technique in conjunction with a keto diet.

Cruise's The 3-Hour Diet has been labelled a fad diet. It was criticized by Rebecca Foster of the British Nutrition Foundation who noted that eating meals every three hours would increase over-eating and cause negative effects on dental health. Cruise has authored The 100 diet in 2013, which restricts the consumption of sugar calories to 100 per day for quick weight loss. It has also been criticized as a fad diet. Dietician Laura Jeffers commented that "this is basically a super low-carb diet. You may very well lose that weight, but it will be difficult to keep the weight off long-term. If a diet is filled with unsustainable restrictions, weight that comes off fast will be fast coming back on."

== Filmography ==
=== Television ===
Year	Title	Role	Notes
2005	The View (talk show)	Himself	Episode dated 3 November 2005
2005–06	The Tony Danza Show (2004 talk show)	Himself	3 episodes
2006	Good Morning America with Al Roker	Himself	1 episode
2008	Today (U.S. TV program)	Himself	1 episode
2011	Rachael Ray (talk show)	Himself	Episode: "Weight Loss Wonders"
2012	Live! with Regis and Kelly (season 24)	Himself	Episode dated 9 January 2012
2013	Anderson Cooper 360°	Himself	1 episode
2014	Bethenny (talk show)	Himself	Episode: "Diet Debate with Jorge Cruise"
2015	Extra (TV program)	Himself	2 episodes
2016	Celebrity Page (TV Series)	Himself	Episode dated 28 January 2016
2016	Home and Family	Himself	Episode featuring: Diana Maria Riva/Hugh Scott/Jorge Cruise
2016	Access Hollywood	Himself	Episode dated 4 April 2016
2016	The Meredith Vieira Show	Himself	Episode: "Eat Sweets, Lose Weight!"
2013–2016	The Steve Harvey Show	Himself	6 episodes
2015–2017	The Doctors (talk show)	Himself	Numerous episodes
2013–17	The Dr. Oz Show (TV Series)	Himself	Numerous episodes
2017	Revenge Body with Khloé Kardashian	Trainer	Episode: "The Former Addict & the Future Bride"
2018	Entertainment Tonight	Himself	Episode: "Intermittent Fasting: Why Experts Say It's the Hottest Thing in Hollywood"
2019	Rachael Ray	Himself	Episode: "Celeb Trainer Jorge Cruise Explains How "Cruise Control" Diet Is Different Than Intermittent Fasting"
2019	KTLA 5	Himself	Episode: "Jorge Cruise on How to Put Your Weight on Cruise Control in New Book "The Cruise Control Diet"
2019	Strahan and Sara	Himself	Episode: "Fitness Expert Jorge Cruise On Intermittent Fasting And Guilty Pleasures"
