= Dancin' on Air =

Television series

Dancin' On Air was a 1980s television dance music reality show. It was the forerunner of the TV show Dance Party USA of the same genre. Both shows were produced and created by Michael Nise and his father Frank. The show started with US$100,000 from a small group of investors that included The Tonight Show Band leader Doc Severinsen. The program earned a 128% return on investment (ROI) within the first six months. Dancin' On Air was shot live at WPHL-TV Channel 17 studios in Philadelphia. The production staff worked out of the Nises' production offices and studios located in Camden, NJ.

== History ==
Dancin' On Air broadcast from October 12, 1981, to December 31, 1987. The program reached seven East Coast states. The program was usually broadcast live Monday - Friday from WPHL-TV studios in Philadelphia, but occasionally broadcast live on-location from other locations such as Penn's Landing in Philadelphia; Ocean City, NJ; Wildwood, NJ; Six Flags Great Adventure; Dorney Park & Wildwater Kingdom; and Hersheypark.

In 1986, Dancin' on Air was syndicated by KDOC-TV in Los Angeles. The show doubled KDOC's ratings in its first week and was then picked up by the fledgling USA Network. Shortly thereafter, USA Network hired the Nises to produce Dance Party USA for the Network. Two years later, Michael Nise learned form USA Network that his production company was chosen over Dick Clark to produce Dance Party USA for the USA Network.

During 1986 and 1987, the Dancin' On Air studio & set was the same one used for Dance Party USA. As a result, during the 1986–87 season, audiences saw the same regulars, guest dancers, and celebrities on both shows on the same days. The programs also shared a weekly talk radio show, Talkin' On Air, hosted by Michael Nise.

Some of the Adult Hosts of the show included Eddie Bruce, Bill O'Brien, Chris Trane, Andy Gury, Annette Godfrey, Christy Springfield, Mike Rossi and Dave Raymond (the original Phillie Phanatic). Mike Rossi was a former dancer who transitioned to being a host and in 1986 became one of the youngest hosts of a live daily television program in American TV history. Regular dancers included Kelly Ripa and Tom Verica.

Performers on Dancin' On Air (some of whom also appeared on Dance Party USA during 86–87) included Madonna in 1983 (her first television appearance), Will Smith (as DJ Jazzy Jeff & The Fresh Prince), Duran Duran (with their first American TV appearances), Menudo (including a young Ricky Martin), Stevie Wonder, Nine Inch Nails, The Jets, New Edition, Sweet Sensation, LL Cool J, Exposé, Jody Watley, New Kids on the Block, and many other popular recording artists of the era.

The show's theme song was written by Philadelphia writer/producer Dan McKeown and Michael Nise. The song was published by Nise Productions Inc. Dan was also responsible for the show's entertainment division. Dancin' On Air would give selected unknown bands and artists an opportunity to perform in front of millions of dedicated viewers and was responsible for launching the careers of some of today's major super stars!

== Revival ==
On July 23, 2011, PHL-17 re-aired Dancin' On Air as part of a special marathon celebrating the show's 30th anniversary. During the marathon, special vignettes were featured with former regular dancers, hosts of the show, and executive producer Michael Nise sharing their memories, experiences and thoughts from the show and also talked about how the show became a major influence and how it changed their lives.

On November 4, 2011, Mike Rossi, Princess, Jimmy Jam (James Ferguson), Andy Gury and Eddie Bruce hosted a 30th reunion dance party celebration. The show was rated #1 in its time slot.

On March 6, 2012, WPHL announced that Dancin' On Air would return to the air on March 31, where it would air Saturday mornings at 10 a.m. WRDW-FM has been tapped as the official radio station for the program. Core group members include Brittainy Taylor, DeAnna Marie, Jeanna Zettler, Mikey P, Paulie Scalia, Anthony Vee, Anthony Franzzo (AKA DJ ZO), Nicole Peraino, Nicole Zell, Ian Ashanti, John Haslett, Kobi Kearney, Casey on Wired, Michael (Mikey P) Pericoloso and DJ Josiah. The show was produced by Michael Nise, Executive Producer and Chrystel Eberts, Supervising Producer.

On Jan 27th 2016, "Dancin' On Air" returned to TV on the cable music channel FUSE TV. The show was co-executive produced by Michael Nise and Chrystel Eberts and directed by Michael Nise and Rob Schwartz. There was a reality show based on "Dancin' On Air" called "Saturday Morning Fever" which also aired on FUSE TV by executive producers Michael Nise, Chrystel Eberts and Tom Forman, Relativity Real. Both shows lasted one season.

(All Dancin' On Air and Dance Party USA copyrights and trademarks solely held by OMNI 2000 Inc., Michael Nise, President/CEO. Website: www.omni2000.biz.)

== Controversy ==
On April 10, 2016, Philadelphia magazine published an article detailing a new feud between many of the people who were on Dancin' On Air in their teens and the producer of the show.
