= Dance Party USA =

- Genre: Dance; Variety; Reality; Music
- Presented by: See list
- Country of origin: United States
- Original language: English
- No. of seasons: 1986 to 1992

Production
- Executive producers: Frank Nise; Michael Nise
- Production locations: Philadelphia, Pennsylvania, United States; Camden, New Jersey, United States
- Running time: 30 minutes (1986–87); 45–48 minutes (1987–92)
- Production companies: Nise Productions Inc; On Air Entertainment

Original release
- Network: USA Network
- Release: April 12, 1986 – June 27, 1992

Dance Party USA is an American dance television show that aired daily on cable's USA Network from April 12, 1986, to June 27, 1992. It was originally a half-hour, but was expanded to an hour in 1987.

The program was always shot at various TV studios including WPHL-TV/17 and WGBS in Philadelphia from 1986–1992. The show was not always filmed live and often filmed multiple shows in one day for different days of the week. When 3 shows were recorded on the same day, the guests appearing on those show were told to bring 3 changes of clothes for each episode. The production staff worked at the Nise's production offices and studios located in Camden, New Jersey. For the first few episodes, Dance Party USA's original name was Dancin' USA. Dance Party USA was formatted like its predecessor, the highly rated Dancin' On Air, a daily TV dance show broadcast from 1981 to 1986 on Philadelphia's WPHL-TV.

In 1986, Dancin' On Air was syndicated by KDOC-TV in Los Angeles. The show doubled KDOC's ratings in its first week and was then picked up by the fledgling USA Network. Shortly thereafter, USA Network hired the Nises to produce Dance Party USA for the Network. Two years later, Michael Nise learned from USA Network that his production company was chosen over Dick Clark to produce Dance Party USA for the USA Network.

During 1986 and 1987, the Dancin' On Air studio and set were also used for Dance Party USA. As a result, during the 1986–87 season, audiences saw the same regulars, guest dancers, and celebrities on both shows on the same days. The programs also shared a weekly talk radio show, Talkin' On Air, hosted by Michael Nise.

== Hosts ==
- 1985–1986: Dave Raymond
- 1986–1989, 1992: Andy Gury,
- 1989–1991: Bobby Catalano, Heather "Princess" Day
- 1989–1990: Amy Brady, Alvin "Spicy" Ramirez, Cindy Stark, Romeo King, Tyrone "Mr. Mitch" Mitchell
- 1989: Christy Springfield
- 1990: Aubrey Ayala, Kelly Berridge, Chris Bustard, Pete Conicelli, Joanna Mistretta, Matt Robbins, Desiree Wynder

== Noteworthy regulars ==
- Kelly Ripa, actress and host of Live with Kelly and Mark: Following a 3-year run as a dancer / segment host 1st on Dancin' On Air and then Dance Party USA, in 1990 she landed what would be her most recognized acting role, Hayley Vaughn on All My Children.
- Heather Henderson known as Baby Heather on the show, is a professional burlesque, singer, model, filmmaker, producer and host for Ardent Atheists and Skeptically Yours podcasts. She currently is a member of Penn Jillette's No God Band and is a vocal activist for atheism and against psychics.

== Theme song ==
The show's theme song was written by Philadelphia writer/producer Dan McKeown and Michael Nise and published by Nise Productions Inc.

== Controversy ==
On April 10, 2016, Philadelphia magazine published an article detailing a new feud between many of the people who were on Dance Party USA in their teens and the producer of the show.
