= Blue Gold: American Jeans =

- Directed by: Christian D. Bruun
- Written by: Christian D. Bruun, John H. Marks
- Produced by: Christian D. Bruun; Mark A. Romeo; Theis Jessen
- Narrated by: Edward Burns
- Cinematography: Christian D. Bruun
- Edited by: Jason Watkins
- Music by: P.T. Walkley
- Release dates: May 31, 2014 (Berkshire); April 4, 2017 (North America)
- Running time: 98 minutes
- Country: United States
- Language: English

Blue Gold: American Gold is a 2014 American documentary film directed and written by Christian D. Bruun and narrated by Edward Burns. The film is weaving together the story of how one unlikely garment ended up connecting us all. Starting in the American West the film travels around the world following jeans hunter and vintage jeans expert, Eric Schrader. An ambassador of Americana, Eric is trading in the history, myth, and intrinsic values that have made blue jeans one of the most expensive and fetishised piece of vintage clothing on the planet. From fashion history and subculture aspiration, to the lost tradition of American manufacturing, Blue Gold explores Americana in a globalized world, where cultural exchange and greater transparency demand social responsibility and inspire innovation.

== Production ==
The film was made over five years, filming throughout the United States, Europe, the Middle East, Asia, and Japan. The film mixes various video formats and filming techniques. Some interviews were conducted remotely over Skype with a local crew present and one scene directly recorded via webcam.

== Featuring ==
Besides the global journey of Eric Schrader, the film features interviews with many seminal designers and cultural icons. Featured people include: Adriano Goldschmied, Renzo Rosso, Elio Fiorucci, Tommy Hilfiger, Marc Ecko, Isaac Mizrahi, Daryl Hall, Marky Ramone, Calvin Klein, Brooke Shields, Keanan Duffty, Henry Duarte, Yo-Yo Ma, Judy Collins, Steven Cojocaru, Daymond John, Andrew Bolton, Harold Koda, Grandmaster Caz, Anthony Haden-Guest, Diane Gilman and many more.

== Original score ==
The film has an original score by New York artist P.T. Walkley with additional songs, also by P. T. Walkley. The film also features the song "Amulet Reprise" by Natacha Atlas and "Make Some Noise" by Grandmaster Caz, as well as the 1927 "Rock Island Blues" by Furry Lewis.

== Release ==
The film opened at the Berkshire International Film Festival on May 31, 2014. It has since screened at the Hollywood Film Festival and Starz Denver Film Festival. In 2016 Blue Gold: American Jeans was the opening night film of the Cebu International Film Festival.

Blue Gold: American Jeans premiered in North America on most Video On Demand platforms including iTunes and Amazon, and will be available on DVD and Blu-ray on April 4, 2017.

On April 7, 2017 the film had its theatrical premiere in Los Angeles.

On June 2, 2017 Blue Gold: American Jeans was released on Netflix.
