= Science of Love =

- Starring: Mark Consuelos
- Country of origin: United States

Production
- Executive producers: J.D. Roth; Todd Nelson; Jennifer O'Connell; Joke Fincioen; Biagio Messina
- Production companies: 3 Ball Productions; Joke Productions

Original release
- Network: NBC
- Release: June 25, 2007

Science of Love: A Modern Dating Experiment is an NBC reality dating special hosted by Mark Consuelos and starring NFL football player Adam Johnson. The show was produced by 3 Ball Productions and Joke Productions. It premiered on Monday, June 25, 2007.

The one-hour TV special explored whether science could offer a method of achieving love, and pitted experimental methods against a more instinctual approach.

After choosing a woman he was initially attracted to, Adam was then presented with a date chosen by him for science. After dating both, Adam had to choose whether or not he wanted to continue with the woman he originally chose, or the option presented to him by science.

On the special, the scientific match, Casey Dee, won Adam's heart. As a prize, the two were flown to Hawaii.

== Link ==
Official Website
