= LetsRun.com =

Website and forum on track and field

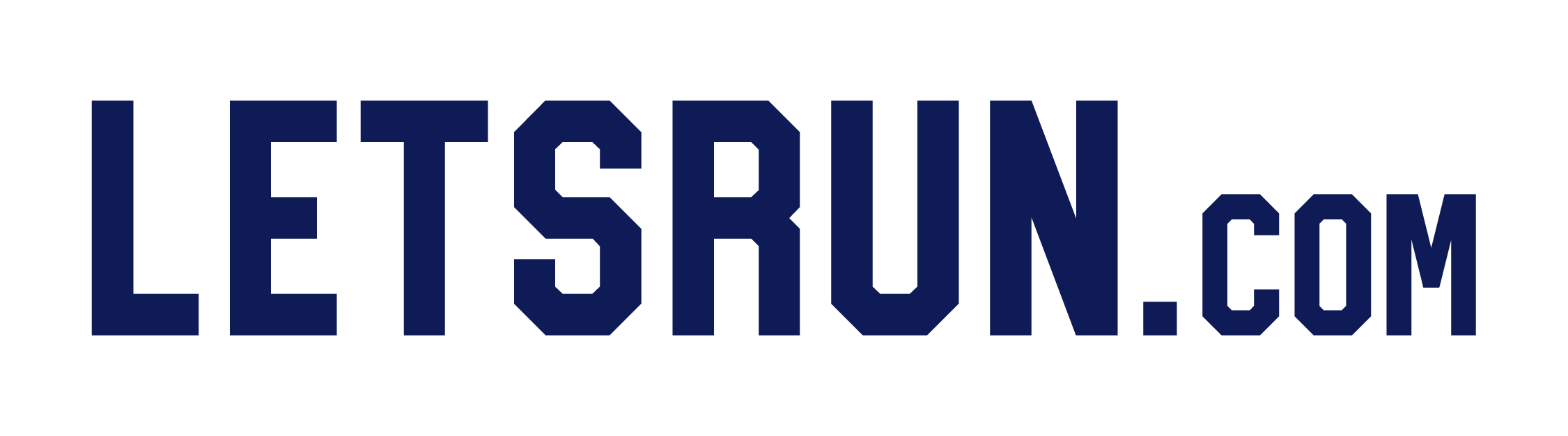
- Website type: News and online community for track and field
- Available in: English
- Founders: Robert Johnson & Weldon Johnson
- Website: www.letsrun.com
- Launched: 2000
- Current status: Active

LetsRun.com is a Fort Worth-based news website and internet forum for information and discussion related to track and field, especially long-distance running. The website provides pre-race previews, covers races, and interviews athletes.

Despite concerns over limited moderation on the message boards, LetsRun.com has been praised for its positive impact on American running and source of importance for the field. It has also become known for the quality of training information on its boards, and a number of internationally recognized coaches and athletes have posted information on their workout plans on the site, including Renato Canova and Henry Rono.

== History ==
Brothers Robert and Weldon Johnson founded LetsRun.com in the spring of 2000 while Weldon was training for the U.S. Olympic Trials in Flagstaff, Arizona, with the goal of creating an online community to facilitate discussion of race results and training as well as to help promote track and field in the United States. According to the Johnsons, in 2009 the website was receiving over 200,000 unique visitors per month, and as of 2020 there have been nearly ten million posts on its message board.

== Coverage ==
=== Doping ===
The site extensively covered allegations of ethically gray activities surrounding the Nike Oregon Project and coach Alberto Salazar, who was banned in 2019 for offenses related to doping. LetsRun co-founder Robert Johnson shared his perspective with the New York Times on one of the most prominent individuals associated with the group, athlete Galen Rupp. Johnson said about Rupp, “I think we should evaluate his career like everyone else but with more skepticism since one athlete is tied more closely to Alberto than anyone else.”

LetsRun provided coverage and analysis of the doping allegations against Shelby Houlihan. Houlihan, a prominent American middle-distance runner, tested positive for an anabolic steroid, which she attributed to consuming a contaminated burrito. The plausibility of this explanation was discussed on the site.

=== Intersex and gender identity ===
The website frequently addresses complex issues, including articles on intersex athletes like Caster Semenya and transgender athletes like CeCe Telfer. A piece on Caster Semenya highlighted her XY chromosome configuration, a detail that the site contended was not widely covered in mainstream media.

A November 2022 article from LetsRun opposed the inclusion of gender identity in sports, arguing instead for competitions based on biological sex. The article criticized the NYC Marathon's non-binary category, claiming it conflates gender identity with biological sex and discriminates against female athletes.

=== Running controversies ===
LetsRun has also appeared at the center of several controversies in running. In 2015, following a viral post made by Mike Rossi justifying his children's absences from school while watching him run at the Boston Marathon, Robert Johnson wrote a 5,000 word article on LetsRun describing "overwhelming" evidence that Rossi had cheated in an earlier qualifying race, based in part on information discovered by various users and posted to the LetsRun message boards. The organizers of that qualifying race wrote that they could not disqualify Rossi's time "simply because they received no reports of wrongdoing as the race took place," but also stated that "there is data from Rossi’s participation in other racing events indicating that Rossi’s time may not be accurate."

LetsRun was also involved in scrutiny of Robert Young's attempt to break the record for the fastest run across the United States in 2016. As skepticism of some of Young's splits grew, one anonymous poster attempted to meet Young in the middle of his run, but instead found Young's support R.V. driving slowly down the road at running speed with no one outside, leading the poster to accuse Young of riding in the R.V. while claiming to be running. Young's performance deteriorated as additional observers began following his progress, and he eventually abandoned the attempt.

=== Other issues ===
LetsRun played a role in covering the Boston Marathon bombing in 2013. The website's forum became a hub for speculations regarding the identities of the perpetrators before they were officially identified. A user uploaded a photo to a forum thread of one of the eventual suspects that showed him near the finish line before the bombings occurred. This posting to the website's forum contributed to the photograph gaining widespread online attention during the criminal investigation.

At the 2016 Rio Olympics, a journalist for the website, Jon Gault, asked Ethiopian medalist Feyisa Lilesa why he raised his hands above his head in an X at the finish line. Lilesa responded to Gault that he did the gesture to protest the Ethiopian government's treatment of the Oromo ethnic group. Lilesa's political statement garnered extensive coverage, with numerous stories citing LetsRun.

The website covered Guatemalan runner Luis Grijalva's quest for American citizenship, and the challenges he faced regarding his participation in the 2020 Tokyo Olympics due to his DACA (Deferred Action for Childhood Arrivals) status.

== Reception ==
Coverage of LetsRun has been generally positive. A New York Times article called the website "something of a superego for American running", while an article in the New Yorker described it as one of the "most knowledgeable and active site for running fans".

The website has come under criticism, however, for the content on its message board. Writing for Outside Magazine, Huber Martin noted that anonymity allows for a broad range of discussions, some of have been fueled by misogyny, racism, and homophobia. The site acknowledged these issues, and in 2020, it attempted to reduce trolling and astroturfing by putting in place new rules for moderation.

== See also ==
- List of Internet forums
