= Robert Young (runner) =

English endurance runner

Robert Young is an English endurance runner, who was originally known for multiple high profile marathons and long distance runs. He later took part in a failed trans-United States attempt, in which he was found to have cheated.

Young grew up in Yorkshire, England. In interviews, he alleges he suffered abuse from his father, and that his attempts to cope with this gave him a resilient attitude. He went to an orphanage at the age of eight and then spent four years with foster parents.

In 2014, according to Young, on a 20p wager from his girlfriend, he ran two marathons around Richmond Park in 24 hours, though he had undergone no training for distance running. He went on to become a long-distance runner, while still working in a car parts store, and claims to have logged 370 marathons and ultras in a year, amounting to 11,000 miles, although there has been no verification of this claim.

Starting in May 2016 he attempted to break the record for the fastest run across the United States. Suspicions arose that he might be cheating, after a fan posted on 7 June that he went to run alongside Young, and could not find him. For five days later in June, a team of volunteers followed Young to observe his pursuit of the record, and noted that he was not performing at the level necessary to beat the record. The group disbanded, with one of its members saying, "I do not want to be a party to putting Robert Young in the hospital". Young abandoned the project on 20 June in Indianapolis, purportedly due to suffering a fractured toe and cellulitis.

Young's sponsor, Skins, commissioned two independent experts from the University of Colorado, Boulder and University of the Free State to track telemetry data and determine if cheating had taken place. The experts reported: "The evidence that we reviewed for this investigation indicates that Rob Young received unauthorized assistance in his attempt to run across the United States. We have identified no alternative plausible explanation for the data-of-record other than assistance, most likely in the form of riding in or on a vehicle for large parts of the attempt."
