= Mike Rossi (DJ) =

Marathon cheater

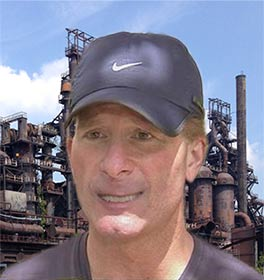
Rossi in 2015

Mike Rossi (born May 1967) is a disc jockey and former television host who gained national notoriety in 2015 after qualifying for the Boston Marathon with a time that later came under heavy scrutiny, resulting in widespread accusations that he had cheated in his qualifying race.

== Career ==
In the 1980s, Rossi was one of the dancers on Dancin' On Air. In 1986, one of the hosts quit, and 36 hours later Rossi was appointed one of the co-hosts of the show at the age of 18. The show was canceled in 1987.

== Boston Marathon ==
In 2015, Rossi ran in the Boston Marathon, and brought his wife and nine-year-old twins on the trip to Boston from their hometown of Abington, Pennsylvania. He subsequently received a form letter from his children's principal informing him that a family vacation was not an excusable reason for absence, and that the school days his children missed would be marked as unexcused. Rossi then wrote a response to the principal, which he never mailed, but did post on Facebook; the post went viral, and was shared by over 28,700 people within a week.

After appearances on the Today show and Fox & Friends, controversy erupted over how Rossi qualified for the Boston Marathon. Rossi had submitted a qualifying time of 3:11 that he had supposedly run in the Lehigh Valley Health Network Via Marathon. The organizers of the Lehigh Valley marathon, in turn, asked USA Track & Field to assist with investigating allegations from other marathoners that Rossi had cheated in the marathon. In exploring Rossi's race history, other marathoners noticed that a 3:11 marathon was inconsistent with all of Rossi's previous publicly-available marathon results. There also were no photos of Rossi actually participating in the Lehigh Valley marathon except at the finish line; he was the only finisher who was not photographed on the course. Most other runners were seen in 10 or more pictures taken along the way by a company hired to take photographs of the runners.

The editors of LetsRun.com concluded that the evidence was "overwhelming" that "Rossi did not run the entire 2014 Lehigh Valley Marathon." The organizers of the Lehigh Valley Via Marathon sent LetsRun a statement explaining why they could not disqualify Rossi's time, stating it was "simply because they received no reports of wrongdoing as the race took place." They also stated that "there is data from Rossi's participation in other racing events indicating that Rossi's time may not be accurate."

=== Aftermath ===
The founders of LetsRun.com publicly offered Rossi $100,000 if he could repeat his 3:11 performance within one year of the offer. Meanwhile, the organizers of the Lehigh Valley Via Marathon announced that they had taken several steps to verify runner participation and timing accuracy after the Rossi incident. The only prior timing mats at the Via marathon were at the start and finish lines. The marathon committee added four on-course timing mats and video surveillance at several locations that Via began archiving.

Rossi was twice elected as "Philadelphia's Biggest Loser" by Philadelphia magazine, once in 2015 and once in 2016.

== Arrest at Kenny Chesney concert ==
On June 25, 2016, Rossi was tailgating prior to a Kenny Chesney concert at Lincoln Financial Field in Philadelphia in Lot K, which opened up to tailgaters at 10 am. Around 5 pm, when he was asked to "move along" several times by venue security, he refused, and when police arrived on the scene and made the same request, Rossi refused again, and was arrested for criminal trespass. At his court appearance two weeks later, a Philadelphia magazine reporter approached Rossi, who told reporters that he was not Mike Rossi. Rossi's identity was immediately confirmed by a court official.

== Arrest at a McGraw/Hill concert ==
On August 19, 2017, Rossi was arrested outside the Wells Fargo Center for allegedly punching a 47-year-old woman following a Tim McGraw and Faith Hill concert. Rossi later posted to his Facebook page admitting he had "a hellish past 2 1/2 years," and "most of it I brought on myself, and I take full responsibility."

== Arrest after assaulting two officers ==
On January 5, 2020, Upper Gwynedd Township law enforcement officers were called to the scene of a domestic disturbance. Upon their arrival, Rossi physically assaulted both officers, who sustained minor injuries. Rossi punched one of the officers in the face, which led to her colleague tasering him. The officers took Rossi into custody and charged him with aggravated assault, simple assault, harassment, disorderly conduct, and resisting arrest. Rossi spent three days in jail and was freed after posting $25,000 bail.

In August 2021, Rossi pleaded guilty to one count of aggravated assault and was sentenced to three years' probation.
