= Mark Consuelos =

American actor and talk show host (born 1971)

- Consuelos in 2026
- Born: Mark Andrew Consuelos; March 30, 1971 (age 55); Zaragoza, Spain
- Citizenship: United States
- Education: University of South Florida (BA)
- Spouse: Kelly Ripa (m. 1996)
- Children: 3, including Lola

Mark Andrew Consuelos (/kənˈswɛloʊs/; born March 30, 1971) is an American actor and talk show host. He rose to prominence as a television actor on the ABC soap opera All My Children for his portrayal of Mateo Santos (1995–2002, 2010), and subsequently as Hiram Lodge on The CW drama Riverdale (2017–2023). Consuelos currently co-hosts the daytime talk show Live with Kelly and Mark with his wife Kelly Ripa.

== Early life ==
Mark Consuelos was born in Zaragoza, Spain, to an Italian mother, Camilla, and a Mexican father, Saul Consuelos. He is the youngest of three children: he has one older brother, who is a doctor, and one older sister, who is a lawyer. Consuelos was raised in Italy and the United States, growing up in Lebanon, Illinois, and later in Brandon, Florida. He attended Bloomingdale Senior High School in Valrico, Florida, and then went to University of Notre Dame before transferring to and graduating from the University of South Florida with a degree in marketing in 1994.

== Career ==
Consuelos had a starring role in the educational serial Connect With English, which aired on public television stations as part of the Annenberg/CPB Project.

In the early 1990s, Consuelos was a dancer with the Suncoast Calendar Men, based in Clearwater, Florida. He left in 1995 when he got the part on All My Children.

In February 1995, Consuelos had his breakthrough when he landed the role of Mateo Santos on the soap opera All My Children. There, he fell in love with his on-screen love interest Kelly Ripa, and secretly married her in Las Vegas, in May 1996. At the time, he lived on co-star Winsor Harmon's sofa; Harmon was one of the few to know that co-stars Ripa and Consuelos were not only dating, but married.

Ripa and Consuelos continued to tape episodes of All My Children until 2002, when Ripa wished to focus more on her other job: taking over for Kathie Lee Gifford as host of what then became Live! with Regis and Kelly (later known as Live! with Kelly, and subsequently as Live! with Kelly and Michael and even later became Live with Kelly and Ryan). Consuelos was a regular guest co-host. On April 17, 2023, Consuelos became the regular co-host, and the show was renamed Live! with Kelly and Mark.

Since leaving All My Children, Consuelos has starred in the feature film The Great Raid, which debuted in theatres in 2005. In 2006, he appeared in the movies My Super Ex-Girlfriend, as Steve, and Wedding Daze. He has been seen on the Lifetime series Missing, with Vivica A. Fox. He also had a part in Ugly Betty.

Consuelos hosted two reality dating shows, Age of Love and Science of Love, both airing on NBC in 2007. He guest-starred on Third Watch, Friends, American Family, Fortune Hunter, SeaQuest and Hope & Faith.

A weekly live episode of the Oprah Winfrey Show premiered in the show's 23rd season with a panel consisting of Mark Consuelos, Ali Wentworth, Oprah Winfrey, and Gayle King. The panel discussed the week's news and highlighted events in the media and on the show. In the 2009–10 season, Winfrey hosted this segment on her own. Fridays Live did not return for the show's 25th season.

In 2010, Consuelos attended the Cop Out premiere in New York where he had a pleasant conversation with Bryan Johnson in view of a spying Walt Flanagan.

In 2012, Consuelos guest-starred on an episode of Law & Order: Special Victims Unit titled "Justice Denied". He played Michael, the prime suspect in a brutal rape during Fleet Week. Consuelos is not new to the Law & Order franchise, he had guest-starred in the sixth-season episode "Albatross" of Law & Order: Criminal Intent as the U.S. Attorney involved in a case where the judge's life is threatened.

Consuelos portrayed Spivey, a recurring character, in American Horror Story: Asylum, the second season of the anthology horror series.

In 2013, Consuelos co-starred as Florida Senator Andy Guzman in Amazon's Alpha House, a political comedy written by Doonesbury creator Garry Trudeau. Along with John Goodman, Consuelos plays one of four Republican senators living together in a house on Capitol Hill. He has spent the summer of 2014 filming the second season.

In 2016, Consuelos landed a role on a new FOX series, Pitch, as Oscar Arguella.

In 2017, Consuelos was cast in the series regular role of Hiram Lodge on The CW drama Riverdale. His oldest son, Michael Consuelos, plays a younger Hiram Lodge starting in the third season. His final episode as a series regular was the fifth-season finale, departing after four seasons.

On February 16, 2023, Consuelos was announced as Ryan Seacrest's successor as co-host of Live.

== Personal life ==
In 1995, Consuelos met Kelly Ripa, his co-star on All My Children. The two eloped on May 1, 1996. The couple have three children: Michael Joseph (born June 2, 1997), Lola Grace (born June 16, 2001) and Joaquin Antonio (born February 24, 2003).

On October 3, 2008, he performed the marriage ceremony for Howard Stern and model/actress Beth Ostrosky at the Le Cirque restaurant in New York City.

For many years, Consuelos and Ripa lived on Crosby Street in SoHo, Manhattan. They sold the apartment in 2015 for $20 million and moved to a townhouse on East 76th Street purchased from fashion designer Luca Orlandi and his wife, Oluchi Onweagba, for $27 million, making it the second-most expensive townhouse sold in New York City that year.

== Awards and honors ==
In 1998 and 1999, Consuelos won the American Latino Media Arts Award for "Outstanding Actor in a Daytime Soap Opera." Consuelos won "Hottest Romance" along with Ripa in 1997 at the Soap Opera Awards. He also won the Teen's Choice Award for Choice TV Villain in 2018.

In 2024, he won his first Emmy Award, winning the Daytime Emmy Award for Outstanding Entertainment Talk Show Host for Live with Kelly and Mark along with his co-host Kelly Ripa.

== Filmography ==
=== Film ===
Year	Title	Role	Notes
2002	The Last Place on Earth	Party Toast	
2002	Pride & Loyalty	Bill the Cop	
2005	The Great Raid	Cpl. Guttierez	
2006	My Super Ex-Girlfriend	Steve Velard	
2006	Wedding Daze	Morty	
2008	Husband for Hire	Bo/Normando	
2008	For the Love of Grace	Steve Lockwood	
2010	Cop Out	Manuel	
2014	A Walk Among the Tombstones	Reuben	
2016	All We Had	Vic	
2016	Nine Lives	Ian Cox	
2026	Scream 7	Robbie Rivers	

=== Television ===
Year	Title	Role	Notes
1995–2002, 2010	All My Children	Mateo Santos	104 episodes ALMA Award for Outstanding Actor in a Daytime Drama (1998–1999); Soap Opera Digest Award for Outstanding Male Newcomer (1996); Soap Opera Digest Award for Hottest Romance (shared with Kelly Ripa) (1998); Soap Opera Digest Award for Outstanding Younger Lead Actor (2000); Nominated — ALMA Award for Outstanding Actor in a Daytime Drama (2000–2002); Nominated — Daytime Emmy Award for Outstanding Supporting Actor in a Drama Series (2002)
1997	Road Rules	Himself	Episode: "Road Rules on All My Children"
1997	Connect With English	Alberto Mendoza	8 episodes
2001	Third Watch	Daddy	Episode: "Childhood Watch"
2001	Friends	Policeman #1 (Officer Hanson)	Episode: "The One with Chandler's Dad"
2002	American Family	Eduardo	2 episodes
2003	Third Watch	Detective Ramon Valenzuela	Episode: "Everybody Lies"
2003	Beautiful Girl	Adam Lopez	Television movie
2004–2006	Missing	Antonio Cortez	37 episodes Nominated — Imagen Award for Best Supporting Actor on Television (2005)
2005–2006	Hope & Faith	Gary Gucharez	10 episodes
2007	Law & Order: Criminal Intent	US Attorney Berner	Episode: "Albatross"
2007	Age of Love	Himself / Host	8 episodes
2008	Ugly Betty	Detective Averaimo	Episode: "Crimes of Fashion"
2011	The Protector	Chuck Wyatt	Episode: "Bangs"
2012	I Hate My Teenage Daughter	Alejandro Castillo	2 episodes
2012	Law & Order: Special Victims Unit	Mike Martinez	Episode: "Justice Denied"
2012–2013	American Horror Story: Asylum	Spivey	5 episodes
2013	The New Normal	Chris	Episode: "Gaydar"
2013	Guys with Kids	Andy	Episode: "The Will"
2013–2014	Alpha House	Andy Guzman	21 episodes Nominated — Imagen Award for Best Actor on Television (2015)
2015	Kingdom	Sean Chapas	5 episodes
2016	Pitch	Oscar	10 episodes
2016	Queen of the South	Teo Aljarafe	7 episodes
2016	Difficult People	Joey	Episode: "Italian Piñata"
2016	Nightcap	Himself	Episode: "Babymaker"
2017–2023	Riverdale	Hiram Lodge	75 episodes Main cast (seasons 2–5); Guest role (seasons 6–7); Teen Choice Award for Choice TV Villain (2018)
2017	The Night Shift	Dr. Cain Diaz	8 episodes
2019	Broad City	Brad	Episode: "Bitcoin & the Missing Girl"
2020	Katy Keene	Hiram Lodge	Episode: "Chapter Thirteen: Come Together"
2022	Only Murders in the Building	Mabel's late father	Episode: "Flipping the Pieces"
2023	How I Met Your Father	Juan	Episode: "Ride or Die"
2023–present	Live with Kelly and Mark	Himself / Host	Substitute host and recurring guest Daytime Emmy Award for Outstanding Daytime Talk Series Host (2024); Nominated — Daytime Emmy Award for Outstanding Daytime Talk Series Host (2025)
2024	The Girls on the Bus	Biff de la Peña	Recurring role
2024–2025	Primos	Tio Ivan (voice)	Recurring role
2025	Running with the Wolves	Himself	Recurring role
2025	9-1-1	Tripp	4 episodes

=== Theatre ===
Year	Title	Role	Venue(s)
2026	Fallen Angels	Maurice	Todd Haimes Theatre, New York City
