= Diane Gilman (clothing designer) =

American fashion designer

Diane Gilman is an American clothing designer and shopping channel television personality on HSN, where she is known as the "Jean Queen". May 2014 marked her 20th anniversary on the retail network, where she built her $150 million jeans empire. She is the number one selling fashion brand on HSN, and also appears regularly on TSC, QVCItaly, and QVCuk.

She began specializing in jeans after noticing the denim industry's void in catering to baby boomer women like herself. Since then, she has expanded her offerings to a highly successful line of tops and separates

In 2013, Diane authored a book called Good Jeans: 10 Simple Truths about Feeling Great, Staying Sexy, & Aging Agelessly. While her book is largely biographical in nature, she uses her story to encourage and inspire women to go after their dreams and regain a greater sense of self-entitlement that may have been withered by societal expectations and pressures placed upon women past a certain age.

She was interviewed by Cathy Horyn of The New York Times and CBS This Morning. She also regularly blogs for The Huffington Post. Diane has received multiple awards for her success in the fashion industry, as well as for her inspirational voice.
