= Kelly Ripa =

American actress and talk show host (born 1970)

- Ripa in 2026
- Born: Kelly Maria Ripa; October 2, 1970 (age 56); Stratford, New Jersey, U.S.
- Occupations: Actress; talk show host; television producer; dancer
- Years active: 1986–present
- Spouse: Mark Consuelos (m. 1996)
- Children: 3, including Lola

Kelly Maria Ripa (/ˈrɪpə/; born October 2, 1970) is an American actress and talk show host. Since 2001, she has been the co-host of the syndicated morning talk show Live! with Kelly and Mark in various formats. Her co-hosts have included Regis Philbin, Michael Strahan, Ryan Seacrest, and her husband Mark Consuelos.

As an actress, Ripa's best known roles include Hayley Vaughan on the ABC daytime soap opera All My Children (1990–2002, 2010) and Faith Fairfield on the ABC sitcom Hope & Faith (2003–2006). Ripa and her husband, Mark Consuelos, own a New York–based production company, Milojo. In 2014, The Hollywood Reporter named her one of the Most Powerful People in Media.

== Early life ==
Kelly Maria Ripa was born in Stratford, New Jersey, to Esther, a homemaker, and Joseph Ripa, a labor union president (Amalgamated Transit Union Local 880) and bus driver who attended Rutgers University. Her father, active in Democratic politics, served as the county clerk for Camden County from 2009 to 2024.

Ripa grew up Catholic. She has three-quarters Italian and one quarter Irish ancestry.

Ripa graduated from Eastern Regional High School in Voorhees Township, New Jersey. During high school she was a cheerleader and was encouraged by her drama teacher to pursue acting. "I owe so much of my career to Jim Boeckle," she said. "He thought I was a natural performer and so he gave me the lead in the next show." She starred in local theater productions and was discovered while performing in The Ugly Duckling during her senior year. She attended Camden County College in Blackwood, New Jersey studying psychology, but dropped out and moved to New York City to pursue an acting career.

== Career ==
=== Dancin' on Air, Dance Party USA and All My Children ===
Aside from local TV gigs, Ripa's first national television exposure came in 1986 when she appeared as a regular dancer on Dancin' On Air, leading into Dance Party USA. Her career goal at the time was to be a newscaster and she often did the cast news reports.

Ripa was cast in her first major acting role in 1990 as Hayley Vaughan, a troubled party girl, on All My Children. She concluded her 12-year role in 2002, but returned for two episodes in 2010 to help celebrate the soap opera's 40th anniversary.

=== Live! ===
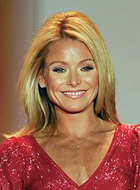
Ripa at the Red Dress Collection, 2007

After co-host Kathie Lee Gifford's final show on Live! with Regis and Kathie Lee, Regis Philbin began holding on-air auditions to find her replacement. In his autobiography, How I Got This Way, Philbin says of discovering Ripa:

There was one guest we'd had on with us a few years before who had [a certain sparkle]. Hers was a natural, quick-witted, unaffected, confident, fun-loving kind of sparkle that both [Michael] Gelman and I remembered very well. We decided to invite her back, this time to consider her as a possible co-host. So that was when this smiling, petite ball of fire named Kelly Ripa made her return to Live! for a test run at the rotating, up-for-grabs hot seat to my left... my God, who knew what spontaneous combustion we'd make together?

On the day of Ripa's initial Live! with Regis tryout (November 1, 2000), psychic Char Margolis was among the guests. During this segment, Margolis guessed that Ripa was pregnant with her second child. Ripa replied, "I haven't told my boss yet!" Philbin later said that Ripa was first among the potential candidates including Valerie Bertinelli, Jane Krakowski, Dolly Parton, and Bernadette Peters: "[I]t could only be Kelly. We knew that from her memorable debut onward." Ripa was announced as the official replacement on February 5, 2001. Within months, the renamed Live! with Regis and Kelly's young-audience demographics increased by 80 percent with Ripa credited for bringing "a new life to the show."

The chemistry between Philbin and Ripa (or "Pippa" as he nicknamed her), their banter, interviews, and conversations about their families, personal lives, and New York City attracted a successful, strong, and loyal viewership averaging 6 million viewers daily. In January 2011, Philbin, 80, announced that he would be retiring from Live! at the end of the year. His final show aired Friday, November 18, 2011, during which Ripa tearfully reminisced about her first day, the 43 steps they walked together from her dressing room onto set each day for 11 years, and how those 43 steps changed her life. "Thank you for everything! It's been just great, my Pippa," Philbin told her in an embrace. Ripa responded, "Thank you for everything. I love you." "I love you, too," said Philbin.

Ripa replaced Philbin as the head of the show and returned the following Monday, November 21, 2011, to continue the show, which was re-titled Live! with Kelly. In a process similar to the one in which she was selected to replace Gifford, a rotating lineup of co-hosts auditioned on-air with Ripa to take over her former co-hosting duties. In the end, Strahan was announced as the new co-host, and Live! with Kelly and Michael premiered September 4, 2012.

Live! won its first Daytime Emmy Award for Outstanding Talk Show on June 23, 2012.

On May 16, 2016, the show's name was changed to Live! with Kelly again after Strahan's last show before his move to Good Morning America. Another round of guest co-hosts ensued. On May 1, 2017, the show became Live with Kelly and Ryan, after Ryan Seacrest took over as Strahan's permanent replacement.

On February 16, 2023, Seacrest announced that he would be leaving Live with Kelly and Ryan after six years in April 2023, primarily due to traveling as his primary residence is in Los Angeles, while the show tapes in New York City. Mark Consuelos, Kelly Ripa's husband, replaced him. However, Seacrest has stated that he will return to guest host whenever Consuelos is unavailable, meaning he is not permanently leaving the show.

=== Hope & Faith ===
Ripa ventured into primetime in September 2003 on Hope & Faith, playing Faith Fairfield, an unemployed ex-soap star. The half-hour sitcom, co-starring Faith Ford, Ted McGinley, and Megan Fox, gave ABC its best Friday premiere score since 1996. The show ended in May 2006 with Ripa declaring she "never wanted to work that hard again."

=== Film ===
Best known for her television work, Ripa also has several feature films to her credit. She appeared in the acclaimed Miramax feature Marvin's Room in 1996, alongside Meryl Streep and Leonardo DiCaprio.

=== Other ventures ===
==== Production company ====
In 2007, Ripa and her husband Mark Consuelos founded Milojo, the production company, named for their children Michael, Lola, and Joaquin. It began with the feature documentary The Streak, which told the story of the Brandon High School wrestling team and its 34-year winning streak. It premiered at the Tribeca Film Festival in 2008. In addition, Milojo launched a first look development deal with Discovery Channel for non-scripted series' including Homemade Millionaire, hosted by Ripa, and the docu-series Masters of Reception. Their next film, Off the Rez, was also accepted to the Tribeca Film Festival and premiered on TLC in May 2011. In 2012, the company premiered its first short film, a collaboration with Will Ferrell's Funny or Die entitled "The Bensonhurst Spelling Bee" featuring Ripa, Consuelos, and their son, Michael. The video has had over 1,000,000 views. In 2021, Ripa and Consuelos served as co-executive producers of the Oxygen series Exhumed, which debuted on January 17.

== Awards and honors ==
In 1999, she won the Best Actress Award at the New York International Independent Film and Video Festival for her work in The Stand-In.

In 2007 and 2012, Ripa hosted the TV Land Awards to very positive reviews. She, herself, is an award winner, garnering five Soap Opera Digest Awards and three Daytime Emmy Award nominations for playing Hayley Vaughan on All My Children.

Ripa was also recognized for her work on the Disney Parks Christmas Day Parade, which she co-hosted from 2001 to 2009, with the Emmy Award for Outstanding Special Class Special in 2006. She and co-host Regis Philbin also twice won the Daytime Emmy Award for Outstanding Talk Show Host for Live! with Regis and Kelly, for which they also received 12 Emmy Award nominations and 4 People's Choice Award nominations.

Subsequently, for Live! with Kelly and Michael, she and co-host Michael Strahan won the Daytime Emmy Award for Outstanding Entertainment Talk Show Host for their work in 2015 and 2016.

The Broadcast Pioneers inducted Ripa into their Hall of Fame for her tremendous success in the television industry on November 19, 2010, and also honoured her as their Person of the Year.

On October 12, 2015, the Hollywood Chamber of Commerce honored Kelly Ripa with a star on the Hollywood Walk of Fame.

On September 15, 2006, Ripa broke the Guinness World Record as twenty-four banana-cream pies were tossed at her mouth in one minute, as part of a Guinness World Record Breaker theme week on Live!. On September 16, 2011, Ripa broke the Guinness World Record for Most Grapes Trodden in 1 Minute, of 5.4 litres, as she extracted 8.4 litres. However, her competitor, Martina Servaty of Germany, extracted even more (8.6 litres), preventing Ripa from holding the new record.

In 2008, Cowboy Mouth, a New Orleans, Louisiana–based rock band, honored Ripa by writing a song in tribute, entitled "Kelly Ripa", that appeared on their album Fearless. The band performed the song on Live! on March 13, 2008.

In 2017, Ripa was inducted into the New Jersey Hall of Fame.

In 2019, she was honored with her sixth Daytime Emmy Award, winning the Daytime Emmy Award for Outstanding Entertainment Talk Show Host along with her co-host Ryan Seacrest.

In 2024, she was honored with her seventh Daytime Emmy Award, winning the Daytime Emmy Award for Outstanding Entertainment Talk Show Host along with her co-host Mark Consuelos.

== Personal life ==
In 1995, Ripa met Mark Consuelos, her co-star on All My Children. The two eloped on May 1, 1996. The couple have three children: Michael Joseph (b. June 2, 1997), Lola Grace (b. June 16, 2001), and Joaquin Antonio (b. February 24, 2003).

For many years, they lived on Crosby Street in SoHo, Manhattan, and sold the home in 2015 for $20 million. In 2015, they moved to a townhouse on East 76th Street, purchased in 2013 for $27 million from fashion designer Luca Orlandi and his wife, Oluchi Onweagba, making it the second-most-expensive townhouse sold in NYC that year.

In 2011, Ripa revealed she had misophonia.

== Filmography ==
Year	Title	Role	Notes
1986–1992	Dance Party USA	Dancer	
1990–2002, 2010	All My Children	Hayley Vaughan	Soap Opera Digest Award for Outstanding Younger Lead Actress (1996, 2000); Soap Opera Digest Award for Hottest Romance (shared with Mark Consuelos) (1998); Nominated — Daytime Emmy Award for Outstanding Younger Actress in a Drama Series (1993); Nominated — Daytime Emmy Award for Outstanding Supporting Actress in a Drama Series (1999, 2002); Nominated — Soap Opera Digest Award for Outstanding Younger Lead Actress (1993–1994); Nominated — Soap Opera Digest Award for Hottest Female Star (1993)
1996	Marvin's Room	Coral	
1999	The Stand-In	Jenni	New York International Independent Film and Video Festival Award for Best Actress
2001	Someone to Love	Michelle	
February 12, 2001–present	Live! with Regis and Kelly; Live! with Kelly; Live! with Kelly and Michael; Live with Kelly and Ryan; Live with Kelly and Mark	Co-Host	Daytime Emmy Award for Outstanding Talk Show Host (2011–2012); Daytime Emmy Award for Outstanding Entertainment Talk Show Host (2015–2016, 2019); Daytime Emmy Award for Outstanding Daytime Talk Series Host (2024); Daytime Emmy Award for Outstanding Daytime Talk Series (2025); Nominated — Daytime Emmy Award for Outstanding Talk Show Host (2002–2006, 2008–2010); Nominated — Daytime Emmy Award for Outstanding Entertainment Talk Show Host (2017–2022); Nominated — Daytime Emmy Award for Outstanding Daytime Talk Series Host (2023, 2025); Nominated — Daytime Emmy Award for Outstanding Talk Show Entertainment (2017–2018); Nominated — People's Choice Award for Favorite Daytime Talk Show Host (2005–2006); Nominated — People's Choice Award for Favorite Talk Show Host (2009); Nominated — People's Choice Award for Favorite Daytime TV Host (2012–2015, 2017)
2001–2009	Disney Parks Christmas Day Parade	Co-Host	Daytime Emmy Award for Outstanding Special Class Special (2006); Nominated — Daytime Emmy Award for Outstanding Special Class Special (2005, 2007–2009)
2002	Ed	Jennifer Bradley	4 episodes
2002	Family Guy	Herself	Voice, episode: "Viewer Mail #1"
2002	It's a Very Merry Muppet Christmas Movie	Herself	Cameo
2003–2006	Hope & Faith	Faith Fairfield	Main cast, 73 episodes
2003	Kim Possible: A Sitch in Time	Future Bonnie	Voice
2003	Batman: Mystery of the Batwoman	Dr. Roxanne "Rocky" Ballantine	Voice, direct-to-video
2003	Saturday Night Live	Host	Episode: "Kelly Ripa/Outkast"
2003	Cheaper by the Dozen	Herself	Cameo
2005	Duck Dodgers	The New Cadet/Herself	Voice, 2 episodes
2005	1-800-Missing	Melody	Episode: "Looking for Mr. Wright"
2006, 2007	Go, Diego, Go!	Maned Wolf	Voice, 2 episodes
2007	50 Funniest Women Alive	Host	
2007	The Knights of Prosperity	Herself	Episode: "Operation: Oswald Montecristo"
2007, 2012	TV Land Awards	Host	
2008	The Great Buck Howard	Herself	Cameo
2008	Delgo	Kurrin	Voice
2008	Fly Me to the Moon	Nat's mom	Voice
2008	Ugly Betty	Herself	Episode: "The Manhattan Project"
2009	Damages	Herself	Episode: "I Lied, Too."
2009	Brothers & Sisters	Herself	Episode: "Sibling Rivalry"
2010	The Marriage Ref	Panelist	3 episodes
2010	Homemade Millionaire	Host	Executive Producer
2011	Hannah Montana	Herself	Episode: "I Am Mamaw, Hear Me Roar!"
2011	30 Rock	Herself	Episode: "100"
2011	Live from Lincoln Center	Host	Episode: "New York City Ballet: George Balanchine's 'The Nutcracker'"
2013	Google+ Hangout	Host	Episode: "First Lady Michelle Obama's Let's Move! Fireside Hangout"
2015	Broad City	Herself	Episode: "Coat Check"
2016	Nightcap	Herself	Episode: "Babymaker"
2016–present	CNN Heroes	Co-Host	with Anderson Cooper
TBA	Geek Girl Rising TV Series	Producer	Based on the book of the same name by Heather Cabot and Samantha Walravens
2018–2019	American Housewife	Whitney	4 episodes (3 voice only)
2019	Riverdale	Ms. Mulwray	Episode: "Chapter Forty-Six: The Red Dahlia"
2020	The Stand In	Herself	
2023	Generation Gap	Herself (host)	
2022	Home Economics	Herself	Episode: "Live with Kelly and Ryan Hoodie, Complimentary")
TBA	Pine Valley	Hayley Vaughan	

== See also ==
- List of All My Children cast members
- List of American film actresses
- List of American television actresses
- List of people from New Jersey
- List of people from New York City
- List of talk show hosts
- New Yorkers in journalism

== Books ==
- Ripa, Kelly (2022). Live Wire: Long-Winded Short Stories. New York: Dey Street Books. ISBN 978-0063073302.
