= List of NBCUniversal television programs =

This is a list of television productions produced by Universal Television and other NBCUniversal-owned companies, including television series, streaming television series, and television films.

== Universal Television ==
Formerly known as Revue Studios until 1963.

Title	Years	Network	Notes
The Adventures of Kit Carson	1951–1955	Syndication	
Schlitz Playhouse of Stars	1951–1959	CBS	co-production with Meridian Productions
Biff Baker, U.S.A.	1952–1953	CBS	
Meet Mr. McNutley	1953–1955	CBS	
General Electric Theater	1953–1962	CBS	
Studio 57	1954–1958	DuMont Television Network/Syndication	
Star Stage	1955–1956	NBC	
Alfred Hitchcock Presents	1955–1965	CBS/NBC	co-production with Shamley Productions
State Trooper	1956–1959	Syndication	
Tales of Wells Fargo	1957–1962	NBC	co-production with Overland Productions (seasons 1–5) and Juggernaut, Inc. (season 6)
Bachelor Father	1957–1962	CBS/NBC/ABC	co-production with Bachelor Productions
M Squad	1957–1960	NBC	co-production with Latimer Productions
The Restless Gun	1957–1959	NBC	co-production with Window Glen Productions
Suspicion	1957–1958	NBC	co-production with Shamley Productions
Leave It to Beaver	1957–1963	CBS/ABC	co-production with Gomalco Productions (seasons 1–4) and Kayro Productions (seasons 5–6)
Mickey Spillane's Mike Hammer	1958–1959	Syndication	
Buckskin	1958–1959	NBC	
Cimarron City	1958–1959	NBC	
Startime	1959–1960	NBC	
Johnny Staccato	1959–1960	NBC	
Markham	1959–1960	CBS	co-production with Markham Productions
The Deputy	1959–1961	NBC	co-production with Top Gun Co.
Riverboat	1959–1961	NBC	co-production with Meladre Co.
Laramie	1959–1963	NBC	
Shotgun Slade	1959–1961	Syndication	
Overland Trail	1960	NBC	
The Tall Man	1960–1962	NBC	
Thriller	1960–1962	NBC	
Checkmate	1960–1962	CBS	
Bringing Up Buddy	1960–1961	CBS	co-production with Kayro Productions
Alcoa Premiere	1961–1963	ABC	
The Investigators	1961	CBS	
Ichabod and Me	1961–1962	CBS	co-production with Kayro-J&M Productions
The New Bob Cummings Show	1961–1962	CBS	
Whispering Smith	1961	NBC	co-production with Whispering Co.
87th Precinct	1961–1962	NBC	
It's a Man's World	1962–1963	NBC	
Wide Country	1962–1963	NBC	co-production with Ralph Edwards Productions
Going My Way	1962–1963	ABC	co-production with My Way Co.
Wagon Train	1957–1965	NBC/ABC	
McHale's Navy	1962–1966	ABC	co-production with Sto-Rev Co.
The Virginian	1962–1971	NBC	
Kraft Suspense Theatre	1963–1965	NBC	co-production with Roncom Films
Arrest and Trial	1963–1964	ABC	
Destry	1964	ABC	
Broadside	1964–1965	ABC	
The Munsters	1964–1966	CBS	co-production with Kayro-Vue Productions
90 Bristol Court	1964–1965	NBC	co-production with Kayro-Vue Productions
Convoy	1965	NBC	
The John Forsythe Show	1965–1966	NBC	
Tammy	1965–1966	ABC	co-production with Uni-Bet Productions
Laredo	1965–1967	NBC	
Run for Your Life	1965–1968	NBC	co-production with Roncom Films
The Jean Arthur Show	1966	CBS	
The Road West	1966–1967	NBC	
Pistols 'n' Petticoats	1966–1967	CBS	co-production with Kayro-UTV Productions
Family Affair	1966–1971	CBS	International distributor; produced by Don Fedderson Productions and The Family Affair Company
Mr. Terrific	1967	CBS	
Dragnet	1967–1970	NBC/Syndication/ABC	co-production with Mark VII Limited
Ironside	1967–1975	NBC	co-production with Harbour Productions Unlimited
It Takes a Thief	1968–1970	ABC	
The Name of the Game	1968–1971	NBC	
Adam-12	1968–1975	NBC	co-production with Mark VII Limited
Blondie	1968–1969	CBS	co-production with Kayro-Vue Productions and King Features Syndicate
The Outsider	1968–1969	NBC	co-production with Universal-Public Arts Productions
The Bold Ones: The Lawyers	1968–1972	NBC	co-production with Public Art Films
The Bold Ones: The Protectors	1969–1970	NBC	
Harold Robbins' The Survivors	1969–1970	ABC	co-production with The Harold Robbins Company
The Bold Ones: The New Doctors	1969–1973	NBC	co-production with Harbour Productions Unlimited
Marcus Welby, M.D.	1969–1976	ABC	
Paris 7000	1970	ABC	
Matt Lincoln	1970–1971	ABC	
The Bold Ones: The Senator	1970–1971	NBC	
McCloud	1970–1977	NBC	
San Francisco International Airport	1970–1971	NBC	
The Psychiatrist	1970–1971	NBC	
Night Gallery	1970–1973	NBC	
The Man and the City	1971–1972	ABC	
O'Hara, U.S. Treasury	1971–1972	CBS	co-production with Mark VII Limited and David Janssen Enterprises Inc.
The D.A.	1971–1972	NBC	co-production with Mark VII Limited
The Partners	1971–1972	NBC	co-production with Don/Lee Productions
Alias Smith and Jones	1971–1973	ABC	co-production with Universal-Public Arts Productions
Columbo	1971–2003	NBC/ABC	
McMillan & Wife	1971–1977	NBC	co-production with Talent Associates-Norton Simon
Owen Marshall: Counselor at Law	1971-1974	ABC	co-production with Groverton Productions, Ltd.
Sarge	1971	NBC	co-production with Harbour Productions Unlimited
Cool Million	1972	NBC	co-production with Public Arts Films
The Sixth Sense	1972	ABC	
Jigsaw	1972–1973	ABC	
Madigan	1972–1973	NBC	
Banacek	1972–1974	NBC	
Hec Ramsey	1972–1974	NBC	co-production with Mark VII Limited
Emergency!	1972–1977	NBC	co-production with Mark VII Limited
Escape	1973	NBC	co-production with Mark VII Limited
The Snoop Sisters	1973–1974	NBC	co-production with Talent Associates-Norton Simon
Tenafly	1973–1974	NBC	
Faraday and Company	1973–1974	NBC	co-production with Talent Associates-Norton Simon
Griff	1973–1974	ABC	co-production with Groverton Productions
Toma	1973–1974	ABC	co-production with Roy Huggins-Public Arts Productions
Emergency +4	1973–1974	NBC	co-production with Mark VII Limited and Fred Calvert Productions
Chase	1973–1974	NBC	co-production with Mark VII Limited
Kojak	1973–1978	CBS	
The Six Million Dollar Man	1973–1978	ABC	Seasons 1–3 co-produced by Silverton Productions Inc.; Seasons 4–5 co-produced by Harve Bennett Productions
Frankenstein: The True Story	1973	NBC	miniseries
Kolchak: The Night Stalker	1974–1975	ABC	co-production with Francy Productions Inc.
Lucas Tanner	1974–1975	NBC	
Amy Prentiss	1974–1975	NBC	co-production with Francy Productions Inc.
Get Christie Love!	1974–1975	ABC	co-production with Wolper Productions
The Rockford Files	1974–1980	NBC	co-production with Roy Huggins-Public Arts Productions and Cherokee Productions
Sierra	1974	NBC	co-production with Mark VII Limited
Sons and Daughters	1974	CBS	
Saturday Night Live	1975–present	NBC	continued from NBC Studios co-production with Broadway Video produced as SNL Studios (1999–present)
Baretta	1975–1978	ABC	co-production with Roy Huggins-Public Arts Productions
Sunshine	1975	NBC	
Mobile One	1975	ABC	co-production with Mark VII Limited
Don Adams' Screen Test	1975–1976	Syndication	
The Invisible Man	1975–1976	NBC	co-production with Silverton Productions Inc.
McCoy	1975–1976	NBC	
Doctors' Hospital	1975–1976	NBC	co-production with Bing Crosby Productions
Fay	1975–1976	NBC	co-production with Witt/Thomas Productions
Ellery Queen	1975–1976	NBC	co-production with Fairmount/Foxcroft Productions and Tom Ward Enterprises
Switch	1975–1978	CBS	co-production with Glen A. Larson Productions
Sara	1976	CBS	
Rich Man, Poor Man	1976	ABC	co-production with Harve Bennett Productions
Gemini Man	1976	NBC	co-production with Harve Bennett Productions
City of Angels	1976	NBC	co-production with Roy Huggins Public Arts Productions
Delvecchio	1976–1977	CBS	co-production with Crescendo Productions, Inc.
Holmes & Yo-Yo	1976–1977	ABC	co-production with Heyday Productions Inc.
Rich Man, Poor Man Book II	1976–1977	ABC	
Sirota's Court	1976–1977	NBC	
Quincy, M.E.	1976–1983	NBC	co-production with Glen A. Larson Productions
Baa Baa Black Sheep	1976–1978	NBC	co-production with Stephen J. Cannell Productions
The Bionic Woman	1976–1978	ABC/NBC	
The Oregon Trail	1977	NBC	
Kingston: Confidential	1977	NBC	co-production with R.B. Productions, Inc. and Groverton Productions, Inc.
Lanigan's Rabbi	1977	NBC	co-production with Heyday Productions
Rosetti and Ryan	1977	NBC	co-production with Heyday Productions
What Really Happened to the Class of '65?	1977–1978	NBC	
The Hardy Boys/Nancy Drew Mysteries	1977–1979	ABC	co-production with Glen A. Larson Productions
Operation Petticoat	1977–1979	ABC	co-production with Heyday Productions (season 1) and Kukoff-Harris Boiney Stoones Productions (season 2)
Richie Brockelman, Private Eye	1978	NBC	co-production with Stephen J. Cannell Productions and Bunky Productions, Inc.
The Eddie Capra Mysteries	1978–1979	NBC	
Sword of Justice	1978–1979	NBC	co-production with Glen A. Larson Productions
The Incredible Hulk	1978–1982	CBS	
Battlestar Galactica	1978–1979	ABC	co-production with Glen A. Larson Productions
The Duke	1979	NBC	co-production with Stephen J. Cannell Productions
Delta House	1979	ABC	co-production with Marty Simmons-Ivan Reitman Productions
Cliffhangers	1979	NBC	
Turnabout	1979	NBC	co-production with Sam Denoff Productions
Harris and Company	1979	NBC	
Shirley	1979–1980	NBC	co-production with Procter & Gamble Productions
Mrs. Columbo	1979–1980	NBC	co-production with Gambit Productions
Buck Rogers in the 25th Century	1979–1981	NBC	co-production with Glen A. Larson Productions, Bruce Lansbury Productions, Ltd. (1979–80) John Mantley Productions (1980-81); Buck Rogers based on characters by courtesy of Leisure Concepts Inc. and Robert C. Dille
B. J. and the Bear	1979–1981	NBC	co-production with Glen A. Larson Productions
The Misadventures of Sheriff Lobo	1979–1981	NBC	co-production with Glen A. Larson Productions
House Calls	1979–1982	CBS	co-production with Alex Winitsky-Arlene Sellers Productions
Galactica 1980	1980	ABC	co-production with Glen A. Larson Productions
Stone	1980	ABC	co-production with Stephen J. Cannell Productions and Gerry Productions, Inc.
When the Whistle Blows	1980	ABC	co-production with Daydreams Productions
Good Time Harry	1980	NBC	
Nobody's Perfect	1980	ABC	
Magnum, P.I.	1980–1988	CBS	distributor; co-production with Belisarius Productions, Inc., Glen A. Larson Productions and also later episodes T.W.S. Productions, Inc.
Fitz and Bones	1981	NBC	co-production with Glen A. Larson Productions
The Gangster Chronicles	1981	NBC	
Darkroom	1981–1982	ABC	
Shannon	1981–1982	CBS	co-production with The Aubrey Company
Harper Valley PTA	1981–1982	NBC	co-production with Ten-Four Productions
Simon & Simon	1981–1989	CBS	
Voyagers!	1982–1983	NBC	co-production with James D. Parriott Productions and Scholastic Productions
Tales of the Gold Monkey	1982–1983	ABC	co-production with Belisarius Productions
Knight Rider	1982–1986	NBC	co-production with Glen A. Larson Productions
The A-Team	1983–1987	NBC	co-production with Stephen J. Cannell Productions
Whiz Kids	1983–1984	CBS	
The New Leave It to Beaver	1983–1989	CBS/Disney Channel/TBS	co-production with Sprocket Films (season 1), Telvan Productions and Qintex Productions
Legmen	1984	NBC	
Domestic Life	1984	CBS	co-production with 40 Share Productions
Hawaiian Heat	1984	ABC	co-production with James D. Parriott Productions
Miami Vice	1984–1989	NBC	co-production with Michael Mann Productions
Airwolf	1984–1987	CBS; USA Network	co-production with Belisarius Productions (seasons 1–3) and Atlantis Films (season 4)
Murder, She Wrote	1984–1996	CBS	co-production with Corymore Productions
Charles in Charge	1984–1990	CBS/Syndication	co-production with Al Burton Productions and Scholastic Productions
Street Hawk	1985	ABC	co-production with Limekiln and Templar Productions
Otherworld	1985	CBS	
Code Name: Foxfire	1985	NBC	
Code of Vengeance	1985–1986	NBC	
Misfits of Science	1985–1986	NBC	co-production with James D. Parriott Productions
The Insiders	1985–1986	ABC	
Amazing Stories	1985–1987	NBC	co-production with Amblin Television
The Equalizer	1985–1989	CBS	
Alfred Hitchcock Presents	1985–1989	NBC/USA Network	co-production with Paragon Motion Pictures, Inc. and Michael Sloan Productions
He's the Mayor	1986	ABC	
Fast Times	1986	CBS	
Leo & Liz in Beverly Hills	1986	CBS	co-production with 40 Share Productions
Blacke's Magic	1986	NBC	
Outlaws	1986–1987	CBS	co-production with Mad Dog Productions
Together We Stand	1986–1987	CBS	co-production with Al Burton Productions and The Sherwood Schwartz Company
Hard Copy	1987	CBS	
A Year in the Life	1987–1988	NBC	co-production with Falahey/Austin Street Productions
Private Eye	1987–1988	NBC	co-production with Yerkovich Productions
Family Man	1988	ABC	co-production with S.B.B. Productions
The Law & Harry McGraw	1988	CBS	co-production with Corymore Productions
Coming of Age	1988–1989	CBS	co-production with Bungalow 78 Productions
Almost Grown	1988–1989	CBS	
Gideon Oliver	1989	ABC	co-production with Wolf Films
Men	1989	ABC	
Christine Cromwell	1989–1990	ABC	co-production with Wolf Films
Nasty Boys	1989–1990	NBC	co-production with Wolf Films
B.L. Stryker	1989–1990	ABC	co-production with Blue Period Productions, Inc. and T.W.S. Productions, Inc.
Quantum Leap	1989–1993	NBC	co-production with Belisarius Productions
Major Dad	1989–1993	CBS	co-production with S.B.B. Productions and Spanish Trail Productions
Coach	1989–1997	ABC	co-production with Bungalow 78 Productions
H.E.L.P.	1990	ABC	co-production with ABC Productions, Wolf Films and Christopher Crowe Productions
Parenthood	1990–1991	NBC	co-production with Imagine Television; Based on the 1989 film of same name by Universal Pictures and Imagine Entertainment
Uncle Buck	1990–1991	CBS	co-production with Verbatim Productions; Based on the 1989 film of the same name by Universal Pictures
Over My Dead Body	1990–1991	CBS	
Shannon's Deal	1990–1991	NBC	
Northern Exposure	1990–1995	CBS	produced by Cine-Nevada Productions (1990); (season 1), Finnegan-Pinchuk Productions (1991–95); (seasons 2–6), Falahey/Austin Street Productions (1991–92); (seasons 1–3) and Brand/Falsey Productions (1992–95); (seasons 2–6)
Law & Order	1990–2010; 2022–present	NBC	co-production with Wolf Films; Seasons 9–13 were produced by Studios USA
Princesses	1991	CBS	co-production with Bungalow 78 Productions
The Antagonists	1991	CBS	
Harry and the Hendersons	1991–1993	Syndication	co-production with Amblin Television
Shelley Duvall's Bedtime Stories	1991–1994	Showtime	produced by MCA/Universal Family Entertainment, Think Entertainment and Universal Cartoon Studios
Tequila and Bonetti	1992	CBS	co-production with Belisarius Productions
Mann & Machine	1992	NBC	co-production with Wolf Films
The Human Factor	1992	CBS	co-production with Wolf Films
Delta	1992–1993	ABC	co-production with Perseverance Inc. and Bungalow 78 Productions
The Tonight Show with Jay Leno	1992–2014	NBC	continued from NBC Studios co-production with Big Dog Productions
Family Dog	1993	CBS	co-production with Amblin Television, Tim Burton Productions, Nelvana and Warner Bros. Television; Distributed outside of the U.S. by Warner Bros. Television Distribution
Johnny Bago	1993	CBS	co-production with Chicago Five Productions and Papazian-Hirsch Entertainment
Late Night with Conan O'Brien	1993–2009	NBC	continued from NBC Studios co-production with Broadway Video and Conaco
South Beach	1993	NBC	co-production with Wolf Films
Fallen Angels	1993–1995	Showtime	co-production with Propaganda Films and Mirage Enterprises
SeaQuest DSV	1993–1996	NBC	co-production with Amblin Television
Mrs. Piggle-Wiggle	1993–1994	Showtime	produced by Universal Family Entertainment and Think Entertainment
Blue Skies	1994	ABC	co-production with Bungalow 78 Productions
M.A.N.T.I.S.	1994–1995	Fox	co-production with Renaissance Pictures and Wilbur Force Productions
Earth 2	1994–1995	NBC	co-production with Amblin Television
TekWar	1994–1996	Syndication/USA Network/Sci-Fi Channel; CTV Television Network	co-production with Atlantis Films Limited, CTV Television Network, Lemli Productions, Inc., USA Network and Western International Communications; Distributed under MCA TV; currently owned by Echo Bridge Entertainment
New York Undercover	1994–1998	Fox	co-production with Wolf Films
Weird Science	1994–1998	USA Network	co-production with St. Clare Entertainment
The Adventures of Timmy the Tooth	1995–1996	Direct-to-video; Syndication/Nick Jr.	co-production with Bomp Productions
A Whole New Ballgame	1995	ABC	co-production with Greengrass Productions and Bungalow 78 Productions
Partners	1995–1996	Fox	co-production with Jeff & Jeff Productions
American Gothic	1995–1996	CBS	co-production with Renaissance Pictures
Sliders	1995–2000	Fox/Sci-Fi	co-production with St. Clare Entertainment
The Steve Harvey Show	1996–2002	The WB	co-production with Brillstein-Grey Communications/Brillstein-Grey Entertainment (seasons 1–4), Brad Grey Television (seasons 4–6), Winifred Hervey Productions, Stan Lathan Television and Columbia Pictures Television/Columbia TriStar Television Distribution/Columbia TriStar Domestic Television; Universal co-produced the series from Season 4–6
Swift Justice	1996	UPN	co-production with Wolf Films
The Burning Zone	1996–1997	UPN	co-production with Sandstar Productions
Mr. Rhodes	1996–1997	NBC	co-production with NBC Studios
EZ Streets	1996–1997	CBS	co-production with Paul Haggis Productions
Something So Right	1996–1998	NBC/ABC	co-production with Big Phone Productions
Feds	1997	CBS	co-production with Wolf Films
Spy Game	1997	ABC	co-production with McNamara Paper Products, Inc., Renaissance Pictures and Warner Bros. Television
The Tom Show	1997–1998	The WB	co-production with Clean Break Productions and Floating Cork Productions
Timecop	1997–1998	ABC	co-production Lawrence Gordon Productions, December 3 Productions and Dark Horse Entertainment
Players	1997–1998	NBC	co-production with Wolf Films and NBC Studios
Team Knight Rider	1997–1998	Syndication	co-produced by McAboy-Wadsworth Productions, Sterling Pacific Films, Copp & Goodman Television and Pacific Bay Entertainment
Just Shoot Me!	1997–2003	NBC	co-production with Brillstein-Grey Communications/Brillstein-Grey Entertainment (seasons 1–4), Brad Grey Television (seasons 4–7), Steven Levitan Productions, and Columbia Pictures Television/Columbia TriStar Television/Sony Pictures Television; Universal co-produced seasons 4–7
Will & Grace	1998–2006; 2017–2020	NBC	continued from NBC Studios co-production with KoMut Entertainment, 3 Sisters Entertainment (1998–2006) and 3 Princesses and a P Productions (2017–2020)
Law & Order: Special Victims Unit	1999–present	NBC	continued from Studios USA; co-production with Wolf Entertainment
Passions	1999–2008	NBC/Audience	continued from NBC Studios; co-production with Outpost Farm Productions seasons 1-4 distributed outside of the U.S. by Amazon MGM Studios Distribution
Work with Me	1999	CBS	co-production with Stephen Engel Productions, Nat's Eye Productions, Calm Down Productions and CBS Productions
The District	2000–2004	CBS	continued from Studios USA; co-production with Di Novi Pictures and CBS Productions; Distributed outside of the U.S. by Paramount Global Content Distribution
Crossing Jordan	2001–2007	NBC	continued from NBC Studios; co-production with Tailwind Productions and Kaledo Dritte Productions; Distributed outside of the U.S. by Amazon MGM Studios Distribution
The Agency	2001–2003	CBS	continued from Studios USA; co-production with Radiant Productions and CBS Productions
Sitting Ducks	2001–2003	Cartoon Network	co-production with The Krislin Company, Creative Capers Entertainment, Krislin/Elliot Digital and Sitting Ducks Productions
Last Call with Carson Daly	2002–2019	NBC	continued from NBC Studios; co-production with Carson Daly Productions
Robbery Homicide Division	2002–2003	CBS	co-production with Forward Pass
Crime & Punishment	2002–2004	NBC	continued from Studios USA; co-production with Wolf Films and Shape Pictures
American Dreams	2002–2005	NBC	co-production with Once a Frog Productions, Dick Clark Productions and NBC Studios; Distributed outside of the U.S. by Amazon MGM Studios Distribution
Nashville Star	2003–2008	USA Network/NBC	co-production with 495 Productions and Reveille Productions
Las Vegas	2003–2008	NBC	continued from NBC Studios; co-production with DreamWorks Television and Gary Scott Thompson Productions; Distributed outside of the U.S. by Amazon MGM Studios Distribution
Mister Sterling	2003	NBC	co-production with Lawrence O'Donnell, Jr. Productions and NBC Studios
L.A. Dragnet	2003–2004	ABC	co-production with Wolf Films. Revival of the 1967–70 television series
Karen Sisco	2003–2004	ABC	co-production with Jersey Television and Eighty-D Productions
Average Joe	2003–2005	NBC	co-produced by Krasnow Productions
Boo!	2003–2006	BBC Two/CBeebies	distributor; produced by Tell-Tale Productions
Century City	2004	CBS	co-production with Heel and Toe Films
Medical Investigation	2004–2005	NBC	co-production with Landscape Entertainment and Paramount Television; Distributed in the U.S. by CBS Media Ventures
LAX	2004–2005	NBC	co-production with The Mark Gordon Company and Nick Thiel Productions; Distributed outside of the U.S. by Amazon MGM Studios Distribution
Hawaii	2004	NBC	co-production with Jeff Eastin Films
Complete Savages	2004–2005	ABC	co-production with Nothing Can Go Wrong Now Productions and Icon Productions
House	2004–2012	Fox	co-production with Heel and Toe Films, Shore Z Productions and Bad Hat Harry Productions
NBC's New Year's Eve	2004–2021	NBC	co-production with Irwin Entertainment and Carson Daly Productions
Committed	2005	NBC	co-production with Blackie and Blondie Productions; Distributed outside of the U.S. by Amazon MGM Studios Distribution
Revelations	2005	NBC	miniseries; co-production with Stillking Films and Pariah Films; Distributed outside of the U.S. by Amazon MGM Studios Distribution
Kojak	2005	NBC	co-production with Traveler's Rest Films and Playa Inc.
Law & Order: Trial by Jury	2005–2006	NBC	co-production with Wolf Films
Surface	2005–2006	NBC	co-production with Rock Fish Productions
Three Wishes	2005	NBC	co-production with Glassman Media, June Road Productions and Furry Prawn Productions
The Office	2005–2013	NBC	co-production with Deedle-Dee Productions, 3 Arts Entertainment (uncredited), Reveille Productions (seasons 1–8) and Shine America (season 9); Based on the British series by Ricky Gervais and Stephen Merchant
The Book of Daniel	2006	NBC	co-production with Flody Co., Bumpy Night Productions and Sony Pictures Television; Distributed outside of the U.S. by Sony Pictures Television
Conviction	2006	NBC	co-production with Wolf Films
Sons & Daughters	2006–2007	ABC	co-production with Broadway Video
Heist	2006	NBC	co-production with Sony Pictures Television, Cullen Bros. Television and Dutch Oven Productions
Teachers	2006	NBC	co-production with Two Soups Productions
Treasure Hunters	2006	NBC	co-production with Magical Elves, Imagine Television and Madison Lane Entertainment
Heroes	2006–2010	NBC	co-production with Tailwind Productions
30 Rock	2006–2013	NBC	co-production with Broadway Video and Little Stranger
Friday Night Lights	2006–2011	NBC/101 Network	co-production with Imagine Television and Film 44. Based on the 2004 film by Universal Pictures and Imagine Entertainment
The Black Donnellys	2007	NBC	co-production with Blackfriars Bridge and IMPACTS Entertainment
Andy Barker, P.I.	2007	NBC	co-production with Red Pulley Productions and Conaco
Raines	2007	NBC	co-production with Nemo Films
The Starter Wife	2007	USA Network	co-production with Haypop Productions, 3 Arts Entertainment, and McGibbon/Parriott Productions
Life	2007–2009	NBC	co-production with Ravich-Shariat Productions
Bionic Woman	2007	NBC	co-production with GEP Productions and David Eick Productions. Revival of the 1976–1978 TV series by Harve Bennett Productions and Universal Television
Lipstick Jungle	2008–2009	NBC	co-production with Blackie and Blondie Productions
Worst Week	2008–2009	CBS	co-production with Two Soups Productions, Hat Trick Productions and CBS Paramount Network Television; Distributed outside of the U.S. by Paramount Global Content Distribution
Knight Rider	2008–2009	NBC	co-production with Dutch Oven Productions and Gary Scott Thompson Productions. Revival of the 1982–1986 TV series
Kath & Kim	2008–2009	NBC	co-production with Reveille Productions and Shaky Gun Productions
My Own Worst Enemy	2008	NBC	co-production with Dark & Stormy
Crusoe	2008–2009	NBC	co-production with Muse Entertainment
Kings	2009	NBC	co-production with 3 Arts Entertainment and J.A. Green Construction Corp.
Late Night with Jimmy Fallon	2009–2014	NBC	co-production with Broadway Video
The Tonight Show with Conan O'Brien	2009–2010	NBC	co-production with Conaco and Broadway Video
Parks and Recreation	2009–2015	NBC	co-production with Deedle-Dee Productions, Fremulon, 3 Arts Entertainment and Open 4 Business Productions
The Philanthropist	2009	NBC	co-production with The Levinson/Fontana Company, Original Media and Carnival Films
Virtuality	2009	Fox	co-production with Look Ma! No Hands Productions, Tall Ship Productions, BermanBraun and Film 44
Community	2009–2015	NBC/Yahoo! Screen	co-production with Krasnoff/Foster Entertainment, Sony Pictures Television, Open 4 Business Productions, Dan Harmon Productions (seasons 1–3), Russo Brothers Films (seasons 1–3), Harmonious Claptrap (seasons 5–6) and Yahoo! Studios (season 6)
Mercy	2009–2010	NBC	co-production with Selfish Mermaid, BermanBraun and Open 4 Business Productions
Trauma	2009–2010	NBC	co-production with False Mirror Films, Film 44 and Open 4 Business Productions
The Jay Leno Show	2009–2010	NBC	co-production with Big Dog Productions
Minute to Win It	2010–2011	NBC	co-production with Friday TV and Smart Dog Media
Parenthood	2010–2015	NBC	co-production with Imagine Television, True Jack Productions and Open 4 Business Productions. Based on the 1989 film of same name by Universal Pictures and Imagine Entertainment and the 1990–91 TV series of the same name
100 Questions	2010	NBC	co-production with Bicycle Path Productions and TagLine Television and Open 4 Business Productions
Outlaw	2010	NBC	co-production with Conaco
The Event	2010–2011	NBC	co-production with Steve Stark Productions and Open 4 Business Productions
Law & Order: LA	2010–2011	NBC	co-production with Wolf Films
Outsourced	2010–2011	NBC	co-production with Open 4 Business Productions and In Cahoots Productions
Perfect Couples	2010–2011	NBC	co-production with Open 4 Business Productions
The Cape	2011	NBC	co-production with BermanBraun, Arcanum and Open 4 Business Productions
Love Bites	2011	NBC	co-production with Open 4 Business Productions, Loud Blouse Productions and Working Title Television
Prime Suspect	2011–2012	NBC	co-production with Open 4 Business Productions, ITV Studios America and Film 44
Whitney	2011–2013	NBC	co-production with Stuber Television (2011–2012); Bluegrass Television (2012–2013)
Up All Night	2011–2012	NBC	co-production with Broadway Video and Open 4 Business Productions
Who's Still Standing?	2011–2012	NBC	co-production with Armoza Formats and Smart Dog Media
Free Agents	2011	NBC	co-production with Very Small Realm, Dark Toy Entertainment, Big Talk Productions and Open 4 Business Productions
Grimm	2011–2017	NBC	co-production with GK Productions, Hazy Mills Productions and Open 4 Business Productions
Smash	2012–2013	NBC	co-production with DreamWorks Television and Madwoman in the Attic, Inc. (season 1)
Bent	2012	NBC	co-production with Quill Productions and Open 4 Business Productions
Best Friends Forever	2012	NBC	co-production with Open 4 Business Productions, Parham St. Clair Productions and American Work, Inc.
The Mindy Project	2012–2017	Fox/Hulu	co-production with Open 4 Business Productions, 3 Arts Entertainment and Kaling International
Animal Practice	2012	NBC	co-production with Open 4 Business Productions and American Work, Inc.
Mockingbird Lane	2012	NBC	co-production with LivingDeadGuy and Bad Hat Harry Productions
Guys with Kids	2012–2013	NBC	co-production with Holiday Road, Charlie Grandy Productions and Open 4 Business Productions
Go On	2012–2013	NBC	co-production with Open 4 Business Productions, Silver & Gold Productions and Dark Toy Entertainment
Chicago Fire	2012–present	NBC	co-production with Wolf Entertainment and Open 4 Business Productions
Deception	2013	NBC	co-production with BermanBraun
Ready for Love	2013	NBC	co-production with Renegade 83 Entertainment and UnbeliEVAble Entertainment
Do No Harm	2013	NBC	co-production with Open 4 Business Productions, Mount Moriah and The Best Day Entertainment
Bates Motel	2013–2017	A&E	co-production with American Genre, Carlton Cuse Productions (seasons 1–3), Cuse Productions (seasons 4–5), and Kerry Ehrin Productions
Camp	2013	NBC	co-production with Matchbox Pictures, Selfish Mermaid and BermanBraun
Hollywood Game Night	2013–2020	NBC	co-production with Hazy Mills Productions and Mission Control Media
The Million Second Quiz	2013	NBC/NBC.com	co-production with All3Media America, Studio Lambert, Ryan Seacrest Productions and Bill's Market & Television Productions
Brooklyn Nine-Nine	2013–2021	Fox/NBC	co-production with Dr. Goor Productions, Fremulon and 3 Arts Entertainment
The Blacklist	2013–2023	NBC	co-production with Sony Pictures Television, Open 4 Business Productions and Davis Entertainment
Ironside	2013	NBC	co-production with Yellow Brick Road, Post 109 and Davis Entertainment. Revival of the 1968–75 series
Sean Saves the World	2013–2014	NBC/iTunes	co-production with Garfield Grove Productions and Hazy Mills Productions
Dracula	2013–2014	NBC	co-production with Carnival Films, Flame Ventures and Playground Entertainment
Chicago P.D.	2014–present	NBC	co-production with Wolf Entertainment
The Tonight Show Starring Jimmy Fallon	2014–present	NBC	co-production with Broadway Video (2014–present) and Electric Hot Dog (2021–present)
Late Night with Seth Meyers	2014–present	NBC	co-production with Broadway Video and Sethmaker Shoemeyers Productions
About a Boy	2014–2015	NBC	co-production with Working Title Television, Tribeca Productions and True Jack Productions. Based on the 2002 film by Universal Pictures and StudioCanal
Growing Up Fisher	2014	NBC	co-production with Aggregate Films and Next Thing You Know Productions
American Dream Builders	2014	NBC	co-production with Steele Mill Productions
Crossbones	2014	NBC	co-production with P+M Image Nation and Mr. Cross
Food Fighters	2014–2015	NBC	co-production with Electus and Rio Bravo
Bad Judge	2014–2015	NBC	co-production with Gary Sanchez Productions
Mulaney	2014–2015	Fox	co-production with 3 Arts Entertainment, Broadway Video and Jurny Mulurny Television
State of Affairs	2014–2015	NBC	co-production with STX Entertainment, Abishag Productions and Aardwolf Productions
Allegiance	2015	NBC	co-production with Keshet International, Nolfi Productions and yes
The Slap	2015	NBC	co-production with Matchbox Pictures, P+M Image Nation and Scratchpad Productions
The Jack and Triumph Show	2015	Adult Swim	co-production with Poochie Doochie Productions, WDM Productions and Bomp Entertainment
Unbreakable Kimmy Schmidt	2015–2019	Netflix	co-production with 3 Arts Entertainment, Bevel Gears and Little Stranger, Inc
American Odyssey	2015	NBC	co-production with Fabrik Entertainment and Red Arrow Entertainment Group
I Can Do That	2015	NBC	co-production with Open 4 Business Productions, Armoza Formats and Live Animals Productions
Mr. Robinson	2015	NBC	co-production with 3 Arts Entertainment and Cullen Bros. Television
The Carmichael Show	2015–2017	NBC	co-production with 20th Century Fox Television, A24, Morningside Entertainment (pilot only), Stoller Global Solutions and Lunch Bag Snail Productions (episode 2 onwards); Distributed in the U.S. by Disney Platform Distribution
The Player	2015	NBC	co-production with Sony Pictures Television, Davis Entertainment and King Fu Monkey Productions
Heroes Reborn	2015–2016	NBC	miniseries; co-production with Tailwind Productions (episode 1 only); Imperative Entertainment (episode 2 onwards)
Truth Be Told	2015	NBC	co-production with Will Packer Productions and Next Thing You Know Productions
Master of None	2015–2021	Netflix	co-production with Alan Yang Pictures, Oh Brudder Productions, Fremulon and 3 Arts Entertainment
Chicago Med	2015–present	NBC	co-production with Wolf Entertainment
Superstore	2015–2021	NBC	co-production with Spitzer Holding Company, The District and Miller Green Broadcasting (seasons 5–6)
Telenovela	2015–2016	NBC	co-production with Tall and Short Productions and UnbeliEVAble Entertainment
Shades of Blue	2016–2018	NBC	co-production with Nuyorican Productions, EGTV Productions, Ryan Seacrest Productions, Jack Orman Productions and Adi TV Studios
Crowded	2016	NBC	co-production with Hazy Mills Productions and SamJen Productions
Heartbeat	2016	NBC	co-production with P.D. Oliver, Inc., Molly Bloom Productions and Reveal Productions
Game of Silence	2016	NBC	co-production with David Hudgins Productions, Carol Mendelsohn Productions, and Sony Pictures Television
The Path	2016–2018	Hulu	co-production with True Jack Productions and Refuge, Inc.
Maya & Marty	2016	NBC	co-production with Broadway Video, 3 Arts Entertainment and Brillstein Entertainment Partners
Uncle Buck	2016	ABC	co-production with Will Packer Productions, Unaccountable Freaks Productions and ABC Studios; Based on the 1989 film of the same name by Universal Pictures and a remake of the 1990–91 series
The Good Place	2016–2020	NBC	with 3 Arts Entertainment and Fremulon
Timeless	2016–2018	NBC	with MiddKid Productions, Kripke Enterprises, Davis Entertainment and Sony Pictures Television
Sender Mandosc	2016-2019	NBC	co-production with The Cloudland Company, 5 Mutts Productions and CSMO
Pure Genius	2016–2017	CBS	co-production with True Jack Productions and CBS Television Studios
Emerald City	2017	NBC	co-production with Shaun Cassidy Productions, Oedipus Productions and Mount Moriah
The Blacklist: Redemption	2017	NBC	co-production with Open 4 Business Productions, Davis Entertainment, The Jo(h)ns and Sony Pictures Television
Taken	2017–2018	NBC	co-production with FLW Films (season 1), Boomerang Productions, Matthew Gross Entertainment (season 2) and EuropaCorp. Based on the Taken film series by Luc Besson and Robert Mark Kamen
Chicago Justice	2017	NBC	co-production with Wolf Films
Great News	2017–2018	NBC	co-production with 3 Arts Entertainment, Bevel Gears, Big Wig Productions and Little Stranger, Inc. Netflix distributed the series in selected international markets
Gypsy	2017	Netflix	co-production with Rhythm Arts Entertainment, Working Title Television and Pen and Paper Industries
Midnight, Texas	2017–2018	NBC	co-production with Moorish Dignity Productions (season 1), Discord and Rhyme (season 2) and David Janollari Entertainment
Marlon	2017–2018	NBC	co-production with Bicycle Path Productions, Baby Way Productions and 3 Arts Entertainment. Netflix distributed the series in selected international markets
The Bold Type	2017–2021	Freeform	co-production with The District, Sarah Watson Productions and Freeform Original Productions
The Brave	2017–2018	NBC	co-production with Kesch Studios
Law & Order: True Crime	2017	NBC	co-production with Wolf Films
Wisdom of the Crowd	2017–2018	CBS	co-production with Algorithm Entertainment, Keshet International, and CBS Television Studios; Distributed outside of the U.S. by Paramount Global Content Distribution
A.P. Bio	2018–2021	NBC/Peacock	co-production with Broadway Video, Human Rabbit (seasons 2–4) and Sethmaker Shoemeyer Productions
Good Girls	2018–2021	NBC	co-production with Minnesota Logging Co. Netflix distributed the series in selected international markets
Champions	2018	NBC	co-production with Kaling International, Charlie Grandy Productions and 3 Arts Entertainment. Netflix distributed the series in selected international markets
Rise	2018	NBC	co-production with True Jack Productions and Seller/Suarez Productions
Reverie	2018	NBC	co-production with Extant Storytech, Energy Entertainment, Cheap Theatrics Inc. (episode 2 onward) and Amblin Television
Forever	2018	Amazon Prime Video	co-production with Amazon Studios, Alan Yang Pictures, Normal Sauce, 3 Arts Entertainment and Brillstein Entertainment Partners
I Feel Bad	2018	NBC	co-production with Paper Kite Productions, CannyLads Productions, Seemu! Inc. and 3 Arts Entertainment
Manifest	2018–2023	NBC/Netflix	co-production with Compari Entertainment, Jeff Rake Productions and Warner Bros. Television Studios.
Magnum P.I.	2018–2023	CBS/NBC	co-production with 101st Street Entertainment (seasons 1–2), Perfect Storm Entertainment, Davis Entertainment, and CBS Studios. Remake of the 1980–1988 TV series Distributed in the U.S. by CBS Media Ventures
New Amsterdam	2018–2023	NBC	co-production with Pico Creek Productions and Mount Morah
FBI	2018–present	CBS	co-production with CBS Studios and Wolf Entertainment; Distributed outside of the U.S. by Paramount Global Content Distribution
Russian Doll	2019–2022	Netflix	co-production with Paper Kite Productions, Jax Media, 3 Arts Entertainment, Animal Pictures and Shoot to Midnight
The Enemy Within	2019	NBC	co-production with 82nd West
The Village	2019	NBC	co-production with 6107 Productions
Abby's	2019	NBC	co-production with Fremulon and 3 Arts Entertainment
The InBetween	2019	NBC	co-production with Heyday Television and Look at My New Bag Productions
Tales of the City	2019	Netflix	co-production with NBCUniversal International Studios, Sweatpants Productions and Working Title Television
A Little Late with Lilly Singh	2019–2021	NBC	co-production with Unicorn Island Productions and Irwin Entertainment (season 1)
Four Weddings and a Funeral	2019	Hulu	co-production with MGM Television, Kalling International, 3 Arts Entertainment and Philoment Media; Based on the 1994 film of the same name by PolyGram Filmed Entertainment/Gramercy Pictures; International co-distributor alongside MGM Worldwide Television Distribution
Bluff City Law	2019	NBC	co-production with Dean Georgaris Entertainment 2.0 and David Janollari Entertainment
Perfect Harmony	2019–2020	NBC	co-production with Hungry Mule Amusement Corp., Introvert Hangover Productions, Small Dog Picture Company and 20th Century Fox Television
Sunnyside	2019	NBC	co-production with Panther Co., Fremulon and 3 Arts Entertainment
Almost Family	2019–2020	Fox	co-production with Parasox, True Jack Productions, Endemol Shine North America, Fox Entertainment and XOF Productions
Fast & Furious: Spy Racers	2019–2021	Netflix	co-production with DreamWorks Animation Television; Based on the 2001 film The Fast and the Furious and its sequels by Universal Pictures
FBI: Most Wanted	2020–2025	CBS	co-produced with Wolf Entertainment and CBS Studios; Distributed outside of the U.S. by Paramount Global Content Distribution
Zoey's Extraordinary Playlist	2020–2021	NBC	co-production with Zihuatanejo Productions, The Tannenbaum Company, Feigco Entertainment, PolyGram Entertainment and Lionsgate Television; Distributed outside of the U.S. by Lionsgate
Lincoln Rhyme: Hunt for the Bone Collector	2020	NBC	co-production with Sony Pictures Television Studios, Keshet Studios, Signal Hill Productions, Pernomium, and Sin Video (pilot). Previously titled 'Lincoln'; Based on the novel The Bone Collector by Jeffrey Deaver; Distributed outside of the U.S. by Sony Pictures Television
Little America	2020–2022	Apple TV+	co-production with Alan Yang Productions, Quantity Entertainment and Epic
Indebted	2020	NBC	co-production with Sony Pictures Television Studios, Screaming Elliot Productions and Doug Robinson Productions
Duncanville	2020–2022	Fox	co-production with Paper Kite Productions, Scullys, 3 Arts Entertainment, Bento Box Entertainment, Fox Entertainment, 20th Television (seasons 1–2) and 20th Television Animation (season 3)
Amazing Stories	2020	Apple TV+	co-production with ABC Signature, Kitsis/Horowitz and Amblin Television
Council of Dads	2020	NBC	co-production with Jerry Bruckheimer Television and Midwest Livestock Productions
The Baker and The Beauty	2020	ABC	co-production with Dean Georgaris Entertainment 2.0, Keshet Studios and ABC Studios. Co-distributed with Keshet International; Distributed outside the U.S. by Disney Platform Distribution
Never Have I Ever	2020–2023	Netflix	co-production with Kaling International, Original Langster and 3 Arts Entertainment
Mapleworth Murders	2020	Quibi	co-production with Broadway Video and Sethmaker Shoemeyers
Ted Lasso	2020–present	Apple TV+	co-production with Ruby's Tuna, Doozer and Warner Bros. Television Studios; Based on format and characters from NBC Sports
Away	2020	Netflix	co-production with True Jack Productions and 6th & Idaho
Jurassic World: Camp Cretaceous	2020–2022	Netflix	co-production with DreamWorks Animation Television and Amblin Entertainment; Based on the 2015 film and its sequels by Universal Pictures/Amblin Entertainment/Legendary Entertainment
Wilmore	2020	Peacock	co-production with Jax Media
The Amber Ruffin Show	2020–2022	Peacock	co-production with Sethmaker Shoemeyers Productions
Connecting	2020	NBC/Peacock	co-production with Wide Awake Productions and Quinn's House
Saved by the Bell	2020–2021	Peacock	co-production with Big Wig Productions; A revival of the original series created by Sam Bobrick
Mr. Mayor	2021–2022	NBC	co-production with Little Stranger, Bevel Gears and 3 Arts Entertainment
The Equalizer	2021–2025	CBS	co-production with CBS Studios, Davis Entertainment, Martin Chase Productions, Milmar Pictures (season 1–2), Wilson Avenue (season 3–5), Shattered Glass (season 3–5) and Flavor Unit Entertainment; Distributed in the U.S. by CBS Media Ventures
Young Rock	2021–2023	NBC	co-production with Matchbox Pictures, World Wrestling Entertainment, Grit & Superstition, Fierce Baby Productions and Seven Bucks Productions
Kenan	2021–2022	NBC	co-production with Broadway Video and Shark vs. Bear Productions
Punky Brewster	2021	Peacock	co-production with Armogida Brothers Productions, Main Event Media and Universal Content Productions; A revival of the 1984–88 series by NBC Productions
Debris	2021	NBC	co-production with Legendary Television and Frequency Films
Law & Order: Organized Crime	2021–present	NBC/Peacock	co-production with Wolf Entertainment
Rutherford Falls	2021–2022	Peacock	co-production with Pacific Electric Picture Company, Fremulon and 3 Arts Entertainment
Girls5eva	2021–2024	Peacock/Netflix	co-production with Little Stranger, Bevel Gears, 3 Arts Entertainment and Scardino and Sons
That Damn Michael Che	2021–2022	HBO Max	co-production with Broadway Video, Leather Suit Inc., Irony Point and Samana Pictures
Hacks	2021–2026	HBO Max/Max	co-production with 3 Arts Entertainment, Fremulon, Pauliu Productions and First Thought Productions
Schmigadoon!	2021–2023	Apple TV+	co-production with Broadway Video and Out of Cinc
Q-Force	2021	Netflix	co-production with Fremulon, 3 Arts Entertainment, Titmouse, Inc., LOL... Send and Hazy Mills Productions
The Lost Symbol	2021	Peacock	co-production with CBS Studios, Dworkin/Beattie and Imagine Television Studios; Distributed outside of the US by Paramount Global Content Distribution
Ordinary Joe	2021–2022	NBC	co-production with 20th Television, 6th & Idaho, 3 Arts Entertainment and Friend & Lerner Productions; Distributed in the U.S. by Disney Platform Distribution
FBI: International	2021–2025	CBS	co-production with CBS Studios and Wolf Entertainment; Distributed outside of the US by Paramount Global Content Distribution
La Brea	2021–2024	NBC	co-production with Keshet Studios, Bad Apple and Matchbox Pictures
Harlem	2021–2025	Amazon Prime Video	co-production with Amazon Studios, Tracy Yvonne Productions, Paper Kite Productions, 3 Arts Entertainment
Saturday Morning All Star Hits!	2021	Netflix	co-production with Broadway Video and Bento Box Entertainment
American Auto	2021–2023	NBC	co-production with Spitzer Holding Company and Kapital Entertainment
Grand Crew	2021–2023	NBC	co-production with P-Jack Industries and Dr. Goor Productions
MacGruber	2021	Peacock	co-production with Broadway Video and Forte Solomon Taccone Productions; Based on the Saturday Night Live skit and the 2010 film by Rogue Pictures
As We See It	2022	Amazon Prime Video	co-production with Amazon Studios, True Jack Productions, and yes Studios
The Gilded Age	2022–present	HBO	co-production with Neamo Film and Television and HBO Entertainment; Originally ordered and developed at NBC
Bel-Air	2022–2025	Peacock	co-production with Arbolada Roads, Ra Shines Inc., Cooper Films, The 51 and Westbrook Studios; A drama reboot of the 1990–96 series The Fresh Prince of Bel-Air by NBC Productions
The Endgame	2022	NBC	co-production with My So-Called Company, Nicholas Wootton Productions, Jake Coburn Productions and Perfect Storm Entertainment
Bust Down	2022	Peacock	co-production with Broadway Video
Killing It	2022–2023	Peacock	co-production with Dr. Goor Productions
Loot	2022–present	Apple TV+	co-production with 3 Arts Entertainment, Normal Sauce, Animal Pictures and Alan Yang Pictures
Vampire Academy	2022	Peacock	co-production with Angry Films Entertainment, Kintop Pictures, My So-Called Company and Big Whoop Productions
Quantum Leap	2022–2024	NBC	co-production with Universal Content Productions, Dean Georgaris Entertainment 2.0 and Quinn's House
Blockbuster	2022	Netflix	co-production with Davis Entertainment, Foe Paws and Shark vs Bear Productions
Lopez vs Lopez	2022–2025	NBC	co-production with Mi Vida Loba, Mohawk Productions, Travieso Productions and 3 Arts Entertainment
The Calling	2022	Peacock	co-production with Keshet Studios and David E. Kelley Productions
Pitch Perfect: Bumper in Berlin	2022	Peacock	co-production with Gold Circle Films, Brownstone Productions and Mne. Anagram; Based on the film series created by Kay Cannon
The Best Man: The Final Chapters	2022	Peacock	co-production with Blackmaled Productions and Loud Sis Productions; Based on the characters by Malcolm D. Lee
Night Court	2023–2025	NBC	co-production with Warner Bros. Television Studios, After January Productions and Secret Bird
Mulligan	2023–2024	Netflix	co-production with Little Stranger, Bevel Gears, Means End Productions, 3 Arts Entertainment and Bento Box Entertainment
Bupkis	2023	Peacock	co-production with Broadway Video and Any Color Dolls
Primo	2023	Amazon Freevee	co-production with Amazon Studios, Fremulon and 3 Arts Entertainment; Originally ordered and developed at ABC
Twisted Metal	2023–present	Peacock	co-production with Reese Wernick Productions, Electric Avenue, Artists First, Inspire Entertainment, PlayStation Productions, and Sony Pictures Television
The Irrational	2023–2025	NBC	co-production with Simon-Binx Productions, Samuel Baum Productions, and Off the Cliff Entertainment
Found	2023–2025	NBC	co-production with Berlanti Productions, Rock My Soul Productions and Warner Bros. Television Studios
Extended Family	2023–2024	NBC	co-production with O'Malley Ink, Werner Entertainment and Lionsgate Television
In the Know	2024	Peacock	co-production with Bandera Entertainment, Oregon Film and ShadowMachine
Jurassic World: Chaos Theory	2024–2025	Netflix	co-production with DreamWorks Animation Television and Amblin Entertainment; Based on the 2015 film and its sequels by Universal Pictures/Amblin Entertainment/Legendary Entertainment
Mr. Throwback	2024	Peacock	co-production with Unanimous Media, Bro Bro and Shark vs. Bear
Fight Night: The Million Dollar Heist	2024	Peacock	co-production with HartBeat Productions and Will Packer Media
Brilliant Minds	2024–2026	NBC	co-production with Warner Bros. Television Studios, Berlanti Productions, 1107 Productions, 72nd Street, Fabel Entertainment and The Imaginarium
Mighty MonsterWheelies	2024–2025	Netflix	co-production with DreamWorks Animation Television; Based on the Universal Monsters franchise by Universal Pictures
Happy's Place	2024–present	NBC	co-production with RM Business Inc., NestEgg Productions and Acme Productions
St. Denis Medical	2024–present	NBC	co-production with Spitzer Holding Company and More Bees
A Man on the Inside	2024–present	Netflix	co-production with Fremulon, 3 Arts Entertainment, Dunshire Productions, Micromundo Producciones and Motto Pictures; Based on the documentary film The Mole Agent
Laid	2024	Peacock	co-production with Porchlight Films, All3Media International, Davis Entertainment, That's Bananas and Fierce Baby Productions; Based on the Australian series by Marieke Hardy and Kirsty Fisher
Grosse Pointe Garden Society	2025	NBC	co-production with Minnesota Logging Company and Dark Chocolate Bunny Inc.
The Four Seasons	2025–present	Netflix	co-production with Little Strangers, 3 Arts Entertainment, Original Langster and Big Wig Productions; Based on the 1981 film by Universal Pictures
The Waterfront	2025	Netflix	co-production with Outerbanks Entertainment
Songs and Stories with Kelly Clarkson	NBC	Based on the segment from the NBCUniversal Syndication Studios talk show The Kelly Clarkson Show created by Paul Telegdy	
The Paper	2025–present	Peacock	co-production with Deedle-Dee Productions and Banijay Americas
Stumble	2025–2026	NBC	co-production with Mama Look! Productions, Defining Eve Productions, Other Shoe Productions (episodes 2-13) and Candy Button Suppository (episode 11)
Ponies	2026	co-production with Exaggerated Pictures, Big Adventure, 6107 Productions, Magical Thinking Pictures and Pacesetter Productions	
The Fall and Rise of Reggie Dinkins	2026-present	NBC	co-production with Little Stranger, 3 Arts Entertainment, Bevel Gears, Means End Productions and Streetlife Productions, Inc.
CIA	2026-present	CBS	co-production with Wolf Entertainment and CBS Studios
Dang!	2026-present	Netflix	co-production with Rodeoscope, Panther Co., Fremulon, Titmouse, Inc., Alan Yang Pictures and 3 Arts Entertainment
Line of Fire	2026-present	NBC	co-production with Random Acts Productions and Thousand Voices
Dig	November 23, 2026	Peacock	co-production with Paper Kite Productions, 3 Arts Entertainment, and Ocean Avenue
Law & Order: Hate Crimes	TBA	Peacock	co-production with Wolf Entertainment
Dead Day	TBA	Peacock	co-production with AfterShock Media, My So-Called Company, and Outerbanks Entertainment
Field of Dreams	TBA	Peacock	co-production with Fremulon and The Gordon Company; Based on the 1989 film by Universal Pictures
Blank Slate	TBA	NBC	co-production with Davis Entertainment
Untitled Julie Bowen project	TBA	NBC	co-production with Bowen & Sons
Unbroken	TBA	NBC	

== Universal Television Enterprises ==
Formerly known as MCA TV.

Title	Years	Network	Notes
The Jack Benny Program	1950–1965	CBS/NBC	1954–1965 produced by MCA Television
Dragnet	1951–1959	NBC	distributor; produced by Mark VII Limited
My Three Sons	1960–1965	ABC	co-production with Don Fedderson Productions and Gregg-Don, Inc
Court Martial	1966	Associated Television/ABC	co-production with ITC Entertainment and Roncom Films, Inc.
The Big Showdown	1974–1975	ABC	co-production with Don Lipp Productions and Ron Greenberg Productions
That's Incredible!	1980–1984	ABC	distributor; produced by Alan Landsburg Productions
Those Amazing Animals	1980–1981	ABC	distributor; produced by Alan Landsburg Productions
The Krypton Factor	1981	ABC	co-production with Alan Landsburg Productions; Based on the game show of the same name by Jeremy Fox
Gimme a Break!	1981–1987	NBC	distributor; produced by Alan Landsburg Productions (seasons 1–4); Reeves Entertainment Group (seasons 5–6)
Donkey Kong/Donkey Kong Jr.	1983–1984	CBS	international distribution; produced by Ruby-Spears Productions
Foul-Ups, Bleeps & Blunders	1984–1985	ABC	distributor; produced by Bob Booker Productions
Puttin' on the Hits	1984–1988	Syndication	distributor; produced by Chris Bearde Productions and Dick Clark Productions
Kate & Allie	1984–1989	CBS	distributor; produced by Alan Landsburg Productions (1984–85), (seasons 1-2); Reeves Entertainment Group (1985–1989), (seasons 3-6)
FTV	1985–1987	Syndication	distributor; produced by Chris Bearde Productions
The Blinkins	1986–1987	Syndication	four specials
Amen	1986–1991	NBC	distributor; produced by Carson Productions and Stein & Illes Productions (season 5)
Home Shopping Game	1987	Syndication	co-production with Home Shopping Network
Bionic Six	1987	Syndication	co-production with TMS Entertainment
Out of This World	1987–1991	Syndication	distributor; produced by Bob Booker Productions
Probe	1988	ABC	
The Munsters Today	1988–1991	Syndication	co-production with The Arthur Company
My Secret Identity	1988–1991	CTV/Syndication	co-production with Sunrise Films and Scholastic Productions
The New Dragnet	1989–1990	Syndication	co-production with The Arthur Company
The New Lassie	1989–1992	Syndication	co-production with Al Burton Productions and Palladium Entertainment
Pictionary	1989	Syndication	co-production with Barry & Enright Productions
Adam-12	1990–1991	Syndication	co-production with The Arthur Company
Shades of L.A.	1990–1991	Syndication	distributor; produced by Papazian-Hirsch Entertainment
Roggin's Heroes	1991–1993	Syndication	co-production with Jennon Productions and KNBC; Currently owned by Fred Roggin
The Suzanne Somers Show	1994	Syndication	
Vanishing Son	1995	Syndication	co-production with Rob Cohen/Raffaella De Laurentiis Productions, Stu Segall Productions
American Gothic	1995–1996	CBS	co-production with Renaissance Pictures
Alright Already	1997–1998	The WB	distributor; produced by Brillstein-Grey Communications

== Studios USA Pictures ==
Formerly known as MCA Television Entertainment and Universal Television Entertainment.

Title	Original run	Network	Co-production with	Notes
Swamp Thing	1990–1993	USA Network	Batfilm Productions, Inc., DIC Entertainment and BBK Productions, Inc.	based on the DC Comics character of the same name Co-owned and co-distributed with Warner Bros. Television
She-Wolf of London	1990–1991	Syndication	The Finnegan-Pinchuk Company and ITV Cymru Wales	later titled "Love and Curses"
They Came from Outer Space	1990–1991	Syndication	The Finnegan-Pinchuk Company	
Dream On	1990–1996	HBO	Kevin Bright Productions and St. Clare Entertainment	
Fudge	1995	ABC	Kevin Slattery Productions, Inc. and Amblin Television	
Campus Cops	1996	USA Network	Chelsey Avenue Productions and St. Clare Entertainment	

=== Studios USA Television/USA Cable Entertainment ===
Title	Original run	Network	Notes
Hercules: The Legendary Journeys	1995–1999	Syndication	co-production with Renaissance Pictures distributed by MCA TV (1995–1996) and Universal Television Enterprises (1997–1998)
Xena: Warrior Princess	1995–2001	Syndication	co-production with Renaissance Pictures distributed by MCA TV (1995–1996) and Universal Television Enterprises (1997–1998)
Young Hercules	1998–1999	Fox Kids	co-production with Renaissance Pictures
Brother's Keeper	1998–1999	ABC	co-production with Axelrod/Widdoes Entertainment and Donald Todd Productions
Turks	1999	CBS	co-production with December 3rd Productions
Happy Hour	1999	USA Network	
Payne	1999	CBS	co-production with Big Phone Productions and Port Street Films
G vs E	1999–2000	USA Network/Sci-Fi	co-production with Rockfish Films
Jack of All Trades	2000	Syndication	co-production with Renaissance Pictures
Cleopatra 2525	2000–2001	Syndication	co-production with Renaissance Pictures
Cover Me	2000–2001	USA Network	co-production with Shaun Cassidy Productions and Panomore Productions
D.C.	2000	The WB	co-production with Wolf Films
The Invisible Man	2000–2002	Sci-Fi	co-production with Stu Segall Productions
Manhattan, AZ	2000	USA Network	co-production with Bats Left Throws Left Productions
The War Next Door	2000	USA Network	co-production with Wellsville Films
The Huntress	2000–2001	USA Network	co-production with C.C. Lyons Productions and Chelsey Avenue Productions
Deadline	2000–2001	NBC	co-production with Wolf Films
Arrest & Trial	2000–2001	Syndication	co-production with MoPo Entertainment and Wolf Films
Welcome to New York	2000–2001	CBS	co-production with Worldwide Pants, Crazy Canyon Productions and CBS Productions
First Days	2001	NBC	co-production with P.D. Oliver, Inc. and NBC Studios
Tremors	2003	Sci Fi	Based on the 1990 film of the same name and its sequels by Universal Pictures co-production with Stampede Entertainment
Peacemakers	2003	USA Network	co-produced by Michael R. Joyce Productions and Outpost Productions
Battlestar Galactica	2003	Sci Fi	miniseries
Touching Evil	2004	USA Network	co-production with Granada America and Cheyenne Enterprises
Wonder Showzen	2005–2006	MTV2	season 1; co-production with PFFR for MTV/MTV2 Music Group

=== NBC Studios ===
Formerly known as NBC Productions until 1996. CBS Media Ventures currently distributes most of NBC's pre-1973 series. Most NBC programs after that point are distributed by NBCUniversal Syndication Studios in the United States and MGM Worldwide Television Distribution outside of the United States.

Title	Years	Network	Notes
Fireside Theatre	1949–1958	NBC	co-production with General Television Enterprises, Hal Roach Studios and Lewman Productions/Revue Studios
Cameo Theatre	1950–1955	NBC	
You Bet Your Life	1950–1961	NBC	Still distributed by NBCUniversal
Victory at Sea	1952–1953	NBC	
The Loretta Young Show	1953–1961	NBC	co-production with Lewislor Films and Toreto Enterprises
Inner Sanctum	1954–1955	NBC	
People are Funny	1954–1960	NBC	
Big Town	1955–1956	NBC	
The Great Gildersleeve	1955–1956	NBC	
Tonight Starring Jack Paar	1957–1962	NBC	
Continental Classroom	1958–1963	NBC	
Fibber McGee and Molly	1959–1960	NBC	
Bonanza	1959–1973	NBC	
The Tab Hunter Show	1960–1961	NBC	co-produced with Shunto Productions
The Americans	1961	NBC	
Car 54, Where Are You?	1961–1963	NBC	co-produced with Eupolis Productions
The Funny Manns	1961–1963	NBC	
The Tonight Show Starring Johnny Carson	1962–1992	NBC	co-produced with Carson Productions (1980–1992)
Temple Houston	1963–1964	NBC	co-produced with Warner Bros. Television and Apollo Productions
Kentucky Jones	1964–1965	NBC	
Get Smart	1965–1970	NBC/CBS	co-produced with Talent Associates and CBS Productions (season 5)
The Dean Martin Show	1965–1974	NBC	Still distributed by NBCUniversal
Animal Secrets	1966–1967	NBC	
T.H.E. Cat	1966–1967	NBC	
Captain Nice	1967	NBC	
Accidental Family	1967–1968	NBC	co-production with Sheldon Leonard Productions
The High Chaparral	1967–1971	NBC	co-produced with Xanadu Productions
My Friend Tony	1969	NBC	co-production with Sheldon Leonard Productions
My World and Welcome to It	1969–1970	NBC	co-production with Sheldon Leonard Productions
Hot Dog	1970–1971	NBC	
Make Your Own Kind of Music	1971	NBC	co-production with Tomka Productions
Go/Go-U.S.A.	1973–1976	NBC	
The Tomorrow Show	1973–1982	NBC	
Little House on the Prairie	1974–1983	NBC	co-production with Ed Friendly Productions
Saturday Night Live	1975–present	NBC	co-production with Broadway Video. NBC only produced from 1975 to 1999; later produced as SNL Studios (1999–present)
Supertrain	1979	NBC	co-production with Dan Curtis Productions
Father Murphy	1981–1983	NBC	
Late Night with David Letterman	1982–1993	NBC	co-production with Carson Productions and Space Age Meats Productions (1982–1990); Worldwide Pants (1990–1993)
Rage of Angels	1983	NBC	miniseries; co-production with Furia-Oringer Productions
Princess Daisy	1983	NBC	miniseries; co-production with Steve Krantz Productions
Friday Night Videos	1983-2002	NBC	
Fatal Vision	1984	NBC	miniseries
Hot Pursuit	1984	NBC	co-production with Kenneth Johnson Productions
Punky Brewster	1984–1988	NBC/Syndication	1984–1986 produced by NBC Productions; 1987–1988 produced by Columbia Pictures Television
It's Punky Brewster	1985–1986	NBC	co-produced by Ruby-Spears Enterprises. Based on the series Punky Brewster
Sara	1985	NBC	co-production with Ubu Productions
Kissyfur	1986–1990	NBC	co-production with DIC Entertainment and Saban International (season 2)
Rage of Angels: The Story Continues	1986	NBC	miniseries; co-production with Furia-Oringer Productions
Good Morning, Miss Bliss	1987	Disney Channel	co-production with Peter Engel Productions
Later	1988–2001	NBC	
Favorite Son	1988	NBC	miniseries
Hardball	1989–1990	NBC	co-production with Columbia Pictures Television
Mancuso, F.B.I.	1989–1990	NBC	co-production with Steve Sohmer Productions
True Blue	1989–1990	NBC	co-production with Grosso-Jacobson Productions
Generations	1989–1991	NBC	co-production with Old Forest Hill Productions
Saved by the Bell	1989–1993	NBC	co-production with Peter Engel Productions
Blind Faith	1990	NBC	miniseries
House Party	1990	Syndication	co-production with Group W Productions
Shannon's Deal	1990–1991	NBC	co-production with Stan Rogow Productions
Gravedale High	1990–1991	NBC	co-production with Hanna-Barbera Productions
A Family for Joe	1990	NBC	co-production with Grosso-Jacobson Productions
The Fresh Prince of Bel-Air	1990–1996	NBC	co-production with The Stuffed Dog Company, Quincy Jones Entertainment (1990–93); (seasons 1–3) and Quincy Jones/David Salzman Entertainment (1993–96); (seasons 4–6); Distributed worldwide by Warner Bros. Television
Guys Next Door	1990–1991	NBC	
Lucky Chances	1990	NBC	miniseries
Johnny B...On the Loose	1991	Syndication	co-production with The Pierce/Silverman Company, Brandmeier Productions and Viacom Enterprises
Man of the People	1991–1992	NBC	co-production with Neal and Gary Productions
Space Cats	1991–1992	NBC	co-production with Marvel Productions and Paul Fusco Productions
Chip & Pepper's Cartoon Madness	1991–1992	NBC	co-production with DIC Entertainment and Rainforest Entertainment
Double Up	1992	NBC	co-production with Slam Dunk Productions
Here and Now	1992–1993	NBC	co-production with SAH Productions, Inc.
Secret Service	1992–1993	NBC	co-production with Grosso-Jacobson Productions and Skyvision Entertainment
Out All Night	1992–1993	NBC	co-production with PAZ, Inc., Alan Haymon Productions and The Stuffed Dog Company
Name Your Adventure	1992–1995	NBC	co-production with Big Daddy Productions
California Dreams	1992–1996	NBC	co-production with Peter Engel Productions
Brains & Brawn	1993	NBC	
Running the Halls	1993	NBC	co-production with Steve Slavkin Productions
Saved by the Bell: The College Years	1993–1994	NBC	co-production with Peter Engel Productions
Homicide: Life on the Street	1993–1999	NBC	co-production with Baltimore Pictures, Reeves Entertainment (1993, Season 1), MCEG Sterling Incorporated (1994–1999, Seasons 2–7), and Fatima Productions distributed worldwide by NBCUniversal; first season co-owned with Fremantle
Saved by the Bell: The New Class	1993–2000	NBC	co-production with Peter Engel Productions
Message from Nam	1993	NBC	miniseries
The Martin Short Show	1994	NBC	co-production with Dolshor Productions
Winnetka Road	1994	NBC	co-production with Spelling Television
Family Album	1994	NBC	miniseries
Amazing Grace	1995	NBC	
JAG	1995–2005	NBC/CBS	co-production with Belisarius Productions and Paramount Network Television. NBC only co-produces for the first season.
In the House	1995–1999	NBC/UPN	co-production with Winifred Hervey Productions, Quincy Jones/David Salzman Entertainment and Warner Bros. Television (1999); Distributed worldwide by Warner Bros. Television
Hang Time	1995–2000	NBC	co-production with Peter Engel Productions (1996–2000, seasons 2-6)
The Single Guy	1995–1997	NBC	co-production with Hall of Production (season 1) and Castle Rock Entertainment.
Mr. Rhodes	1996–1997	NBC	co-production with Universal Television
The Pretender	1996–2000	NBC	co-production with Mitchell/Van Sickle Productions, MTM Enterprises (season 1) and 20th Century Fox Television (seasons 2–4); International distributor; distributed in North America by Disney–ABC Domestic Television
Profiler	1996–2000	NBC	co-production with Three Putt Productions (1998–2000) (seasons 3–4) and Sander/Moses Productions
Doomsday Virus	1996	NBC	miniseries
Sunset Beach	1997–1999	NBC	co-production with Spelling Daytime Television
The Tony Danza Show	1997	NBC	co-production with Katie Face Productions, Kokoro Productions and Columbia TriStar Television
Union Square	1997–1998	NBC	co-production with Barron/Pennette Productions and Three Sisters Entertainment
Sleepwalkers	1997–1998	NBC	co-production with Columbia TriStar Television
Players	1997–1998	NBC	co-production with Wolf Films and Universal Television
Working	1997–1999	NBC	co-production with Davidoff/Rosenthal Productions
USA High	1997–1999	USA Network	co-production with Peter Engel Productions and Rysher Entertainment
City Guys	1997–2001	NBC	co-production with Peter Engel Productions
House Rules	1998	NBC	co-production with Christopher Thompson Productions and Columbia TriStar Television
Conrad Bloom	1998	NBC	co-production with Pennette Productions and Sister Entertainment
Malibu, CA	1998–2000	Syndication	co-produced by Peter Engel Productions and Tribune Entertainment
One World	1998–2001	NBC	co-production with Peter Engel Productions
Everything's Relative	1999	NBC	co-production with Witt/Thomas Productions and Warner Bros. Television
Cold Feet	1999	NBC	co-production with Kerry Ehrin Productions and Granada Entertainment USA
The Mike O'Malley Show	1999	NBC	
Providence	1999–2002	NBC	co-production with John Masius Productions (until season 5)
World's Most Amazing Videos	1999–2001	NBC	co-production with Nash Entertainment; Distributed by Alfred Haber Distribution
Twenty-One	2000	NBC	co-production with The Fred Silverman Company and The Gurin Company. Revival of the 1956–1958 game show by Jack Barry-Dan Enright Productions
The Others	2000	NBC	co-production with Delusional Films and DreamWorks Television
God, the Devil and Bob	2000	NBC/Adult Swim	co-production with Vanity Logo Productions for Carsey-Werner Productions
M.Y.O.B.	2000	NBC	co-production with Charade Productions
Titans	2000	NBC	co-production with Spelling Television
Tucker	2000	NBC	co-production with Sudden Entertainment and Regency Television
DAG	2000–2001	NBC	co-production with Gordon & Conn Productions and Double Wide Productions
Cursed/The Weber Show	2000–2001	NBC	co-production with Artists Television Group and Captain Shadow And Steve
Just Deal	2000–2002	NBC	co-production with Lynch Entertainment and GEP Productions
Ed	2000–2004	NBC	co-production with Worldwide Pants and Viacom Productions
Three Sisters	2001–2002	NBC	co-production with Blackie and Blondie Productions
First Years	2001	NBC	co-production with P.D. Oliver, Inc. and Studios USA Television
The Fighting Fitzgeralds	2001	NBC	co-production with Artists Television Group, Irish Twins Productions and Mauretania Productions
Emeril	2001	NBC	co-produced with Mozark Productions
The Downer Channel	2001	NBC	co-production with Carsey-Werner Productions
All About Us	2001	NBC	co-production with Peter Engel Productions
Lost	2001	NBC	co-production with Conaco
UC: Undercover	2001–2002	NBC	co-production with Jersey Television, Chasing Time Pictures, Regency Television and 20th Century Fox Television
Inside Schwartz	2001–2002	NBC	co-production with Stephen Engel Productions and 20th Television
Weakest Link	2001–2003	NBC/Syndication	co-production with Laurelwood Entertainment (first episodes), The Gurin Company (later episodes) and BBC Worldwide Americas
Leap of Faith	2002	NBC	co-production with Perkins Street Productions
The Rerun Show	2002	NBC	co-production with David Salzman Enterprises, John Davies Enterprises, Inc. and Columbia TriStar Television
Boomtown	2002–2003	NBC	co-production with Nemo Films and DreamWorks Television
In-Laws	2002–2003	NBC	co-production with Grammnet Productions and Paramount Network Television
Dog Eat Dog	2002–2003	NBC	co-production with BBC Worldwide Americas
Watching Ellie	2002–2003	NBC	co-production with Hammond's Reef Productions
Hidden Hills	2002–2003	NBC	co-production with Primarily Entertainment and Rude Mood Productions
America's Most Talented Kid	2003–2005	NBC/PAX	NBC only produces the first season.
A.U.S.A.	2003	NBC	co-production with Persons Unknown Productions and 20th Century Fox Television
Hunter	2003	NBC	co-production with 20th Century Fox Television and Stu Segall Productions
Lost at Home	2003	ABC	co-production with Michael Jacobs Productions and Touchstone Television
Mister Sterling	2003	NBC	co-production with Lawrence O'Donnell, Jr. Productions and Universal Network Television
Kingpin	2003	NBC	co-production with Knee Deep Productions and Spelling Television
Coupling	2003	NBC	co-production with Reveille Productions, Hartswood Films, BBC Worldwide and Universal Network Television
Whoopi	2003–2004	NBC	co-production with One Ho Productions and Carsey-Werner-Mandabach Productions
The Tracy Morgan Show	2003–2004	NBC	co-production with Broadway Video and Carsey-Werner-Manadbach Productions
Happy Family	2003–2004	NBC	co-production with Guarascio/Port Productions
Average Joe	2003–2005	NBC	co-produced with Krasnow Productions
Come to Papa	2004	NBC	co-production with Stan Allen Productions and Warner Bros. Television
Next Action Star	2004	NBC	co-production with Warner Bros. Television, Silver Pictures Television, Brass Ring Productions and GRB Entertainment; Last NBC produced series before its merger with Universal

== Universal Content Productions ==
Formerly known as Universal Cable Productions until 2019.

Title	Years	Network	Notes
Law & Order: Criminal Intent	2001–2011	NBC/USA Network	co-production with Wolf Films; UCP co-produced the series from 2008 to 2011 when it moved to NBC's sister channel USA
Monk	2002–2009	USA Network	co-production with Mandeville Films and Touchstone Television; UCP only co-produced the final two seasons.
Battlestar Galactica	2004–2009	Syfy	continued from Universal Television co-production with David Eick Productions, R&D TV and Sky UK; UCP only co-produced the final season Revival of the 1978–1979 series of the same name by Glen A. Larson.
Psych	2006–2014	USA Network	co-production with Pacific Mountain Productions and Tagline Television. UCP only co-produced seasons 3–8.
Eureka	2006–2012	Syfy	continued from Universal Television; UCP only handled the final three seasons.
In Plain Sight	2008–2012	USA Network	co-production with Pirates' Cove Entertainment (seasons 1–2), Tiny Clambake Productions (season 2), McNamara Paper Products (season 3) and Frontier Pictures (seasons 4–5); UCP handled the rest of the series with Universal Media Studios handling the first few episodes.
The Starter Wife	2008	USA Network	co-production with Haypop Productions, 3 Arts Entertainment and McGibbon-Parriott Productions
Royal Pains	2009–2016	USA Network	co-production with 34 Films, Prospect Park and Open 4 Business Productions
Warehouse 13	2009–2014	Syfy	
Caprica	2010	Syfy	
Covert Affairs	2010–2014	USA Network	co-production with Corman & Ord and Hypnotic Films & Television
Being Human	2011–2014	Syfy	co-production.with Muse Entertainment Enterprises; UCP replaced Zodiak Media as the co-production company for the International release of the show's fourth season.
Fairly Legal	2011–2012	USA Network	co-production with Steve Stark Productions, Garfield St. Productions, and Ocko & Company
Suits	2011–2019	USA Network	co-production with Untitled Korsh Company and Hypnotic Films & Television
Necessary Roughness	2011–2013	USA Network	co-production with Still Married Productions and Sony Pictures Television
Alphas	2011–2012	Syfy	co-production with BermanBraun
Against the Wall	2011	Lifetime	co-production with Paid My Dues Productions and Open 4 Business Productions
I Just Want My Pants Back	2011–2012	MTV	co-production with Hypnotic
Battlestar Galactica: Blood & Chrome	2012	Machinima.com	
Defiance	2013–2015	Syfy	co-production with Five & Dime Productions
Playing House	2014–2017	USA Network	co-production with A24, Parham St. Clair Productions and Open 4 Business Productions
Satisfaction	2014–2015	USA Network	co-production with Krasnoff/Foster Entertainment, Rhythm Arts Entertainment and Sony Pictures Television
Dominion	2014–2015	Syfy	co-production with FanFare Productions, Film Afrika, Bold Films, and Sony Pictures Television; Based on the 2010 film Legion by Screen Gems
Ascension	2014	Syfy	co-production with Sea to Sky Entertainment, Levens, Blumhouse Productions and Lionsgate Television
Girlfriends' Guide to Divorce	2014–2018	Bravo	co-production with Tiny Pyro Productions
12 Monkeys	2015–2018	Syfy	co-production with Division Street and Atlas Entertainment; Based on the 1995 film of the same name by Universal Pictures
Dig	2015	USA Network	co-production with Tailwind Productions, G. Raff Productions, The Jackal Group and Keshet International
The Royals	2015–2018	E!	co-production with Mastermind Laboratories, Varsity Pictures and Lionsgate Television
Killjoys	2015–2019	Syfy	co-production with Mendacity Pictures, Bell Media and Temple Street Productions; UCP only handles the International release of the series.
Mr. Robot	2015–2019	USA Network	co-production with Anonymous Content and Esmail Corp
Difficult People	2015–2017	Hulu	co-production with Paper Kite Productions, 3 Arts Entertainment and Jax Media
Childhood's End	2015	Syfy	co-production with Michael De Luca Productions, Monastic Productions and Weed Road Pictures
The Magicians	2015–2020	Syfy	co-production with McNamara Moving Company, Man Sewing Dinosaur and Groundswell Productions
Colony	2016–2018	USA Network	co-production with Carlton Cuse Productions, (season 1) Cuse Productions (season 2), Genre Arts (season 3) and Legendary Television
Hunters	2016	Syfy	co-production with Gangtackle Entertainment and Valhalla Entertainment
Queen of the South	2016–2021	USA Network	co-production with Frequency Films, Friendly Films, Skeeter Rosenbaum Productions, Touchstone Television (seasons 1–4) and 20th Television (season 5)
HarmonQuest	2016–2019	Seeso/VRV	co-production with Harmonious Claptrap and Starburns Industries
Falling Water	2016–2018	USA Network	co-production with Gangtackle Productions and Valhalla Entertainment
Aftermath	2016	Syfy	co-production with Bell Media and Halfire Entertainment
Channel Zero	2016–2018	Syfy	co-production with Eat The Cat and UTMK Limited
Eyewitness	2016	USA Network	co-production with Adi TV Studios
Shooter	2016–2018	USA Network	co-production with Leverage Entertainment, Closest to the Hole Productions and Paramount Television; Based on the 2007 film of the same name by Paramount Pictures
Incorporated	2016–2017	Syfy	co-production with Pearl Street Films, Algorithm Entertainment and CBS Television Studios
Imposters	2017–2018	Bravo	co-production with Villa Walk Productions and Riverrun Films
The Arrangement	2017–2018	E!	co-production with Sneaky Pictures, Inc., All3Media America and Main Event Media
Blood Drive	2017	Syfy	co-production with Strong & Dobbs
The Sinner	2017–2021	USA Network	co-production with Iron Ocean
Damnation	2017–2018	USA Network	co-production with No Possum Productions, Entertainment 360, Turnpike and Netflix
Happy!	2017–2019	Syfy	co-production with Original Film, Littleton Road and Hypernormal (season 2); Netflix distributed the series in other countries
Unsolved	2018	USA Network	co-production with HemingwayTaylor
Impulse	2018–2019	YouTube Premium	co-production with Hypnotic
The Purge	2018–2019	USA Network	co-production with Blumhouse Television, Platinum Dunes, Man in a Tree Productions and Racket Squad Productions (season 1); Based on the 2013 film of the same name and its sequels by Universal Pictures
Dirty John	2018–2020	Bravo/USA Network	co-production with Atlas Entertainment, Los Angeles Times Studios and Nutmegger
Homecoming	2018–2020	Amazon Prime Video	co-production with Amazon Studios, Anonymous Content, Esmail Corp, Gimlet Media, Red Om Films and We Here At
Deadly Class	2019	Syfy	co-production with Gozie AGBO, Chipmunk Hill, Getaway Entertainment, Giant Generator, 2 Miles Entertainment and Sony Pictures Television
The Act	2019	Hulu	co-production with Eat the Cat and Writ Large
The Umbrella Academy	2019–2024	Netflix	co-production with Dark Horse Entertainment, Borderline Entertainment (seasons 1–2) and Irish Cowboy (seasons 3–4)
Pearson	2019	USA Network	co-production with Untitled Korsh Company, Hypnotic Films & Television and Major Migraine, Inc.
Treadstone	2019–2020	USA Network	co-production with Captivate Entertainment, Tailwind Productions and Imperative Entertainment
Dare Me	2019–2020	USA Network	co-production with Megan Abbott, Drowning Girl Productions, Fair Harbour Productions and Film 44
Briarpatch	2020	USA Network	co-production with Anonymous Content, Voodoo Ltd., Esmail Corp and Paramount Television Studios
The At Home Variety Show Featuring Seth MacFarlane	2020	Peacock	co-production with Jax Media and Fuzzy Door Productions
Brave New World	2020	Peacock	co-production with Amblin Television and David Wiener
A Wilderness of Error	2020	FX	co-production with Truth Media, Rachael Horovitz Prods., Blumhouse Television and FXP
Resident Alien	2021–2025	Syfy/USA Network	co-production with Jocko Productions, Amblin Television and Dark Horse Entertainment
Punky Brewster	2021	Peacock	co-production with Armogida Brothers Productions, Main Event Media and Universal Television; Remake of the 1984–88 series of the same name by NBC Productions
Dr. Death	2021–2023	Peacock	co-production with Littleton Road Productions, Escape Artists and Wondery
Dr Death: The Undoctored Story	2021	Peacock	co-production with Wondery and Peacock Media Productions
One of Us Is Lying	2021–2022	Peacock	co-production with 5MM
Chucky	2021–2024	Syfy; USA Network	co-production with Pheidippides, David Kirschner Productions and Eat The Cat; Based on the 1988 film Child's Play by United Artists, as well as its sequels by Universal Pictures and Rogue Pictures
Joe vs. Carole	2022	Peacock	co-production with Matchbox Pictures and Wondery
The Girl from Plainville	2022	Hulu	co-production with Happy Friday Productions, Lewellen Pictures, Echo Lake Entertainment and Littleton Road Productions
Gaslit	2022	Starz	co-production with Esmail Corp., Anonymous Content, Red Om Films, and Slate
Candy	2022	Hulu	co-production with Eat The Cat, Iron Ocean, Boss Clown Productions and 20th Television
Angelyne	2022	Peacock	co-production with Esmail Corp, Compostition 8, The Hollywood Reporter and Anonymous Content
Queer as Folk	2022	Peacock	co-production with Red Production Company, All3Media International, Piece of Work and Furnace Room Films
The Resort	2022	Peacock	co-production with Esmail Corp, Anonymous Content, Quadraturin and All for Ramonez
The End Is Nye	2022	Peacock	co-production with Universal Television Alternative Studio, Fuzzy Door Productions and Beetlecod Productions
Quantum Leap	2022–2024	NBC	co-production with Universal Television, Dean Georgaris Entertainment 2.0 and Quinn's House
A Friend of the Family	2022	Peacock	co-production with Eat the Cat
Based on a True Story	2023–2024	Peacock	co-production with Overlook Productions and Aggregate Films
Scott Pilgrim Takes Off	2023	Netflix	co-production with Marc Platt Productions, Complete Fiction, Faust Av and Science Saru
Ted	2024–2026	Peacock	co-production with Fuzzy Door Productions and MRC Television; Based on the 2012 film of the same name by Seth MacFarlane
Apples Never Fall	2024	Peacock	co-production with Matchbox Pictures, Call Me Mel Productions Inc., Universal International Studios and Heyday Television
Teacup	2024	Peacock	co-production with Parkside Baroo, Inc., Atomic Monster and Population
Hysteria!	2024	Peacock	co-production with Good Fear Content, GoldDay, Drive–Thru Productions and Cat Dead, Details Later, Inc.
Suits LA	2025	NBC	co-production with Untitled Korsh Company and Hypnotic Films & Television
Long Bright River	2025	Peacock	co-production with Original Film, Pascal Pictures, Black Mass Productions and Sony Pictures Television
Devil in Disguise: John Wayne Gacy	2025	Peacock	co-production with NBC News Studios and Littleton Road Productions; Based on the documentary of the same name by NBC News Studios
The Copenhagen Test	2025	Peacock	co-production with Atomic Monster and Bully Pile Productions
The 'Burbs	2026	Peacock	co-production with Fuzzy Door Productions, Imagine Entertainment and Out of the Blue Productions; Based on the 1989 film of the same name by Joe Dante
Cape Fear	2026	Apple TV	co-production with Eat the Cat and Amblin Television; Based on the 1991 film of the same name by Universal Pictures
The Five-Star Weekend	2026	Peacock	co-production with Dinner Party Productions
Ted: The Animated Series	TBA	Peacock	co-production with Fuzzy Door Productions and MRC Television; Based on the 2012 film of same name by Seth MacFarlane
Untitled Casper the Friendly Ghost live-action series	TBA	Disney+	co-production with DreamWorks Animation Television
The Von Bulow Affair	TBA	Investigation Discovery	Based on the book of the same name by William Wright
All the Colors of the Dark	TBA	TBA	co-production with Thousand Voices and Dinner Party Productions; Based on the novel of the same name by Chris Whitaker
1313	TBA	TBA	co-production with Atomic Monster and LAB Brew; Based on the 1964 TV series The Munsters by Allan Burns and Chris Hayward

== Universal International Studios ==
Title	Years	Network	Notes
Top Chef Canada	2011–present	Flavour Network	co-production with Insight Productions
The Worricker Trilogy	2011–2014	BBC Two	co-production with Heyday Films, Carnival Films, Runaway Fridge TV, Beagle Pug Films and Masterpiece
True Love	2012	BBC One	co-production with Working Title Television
The Hollow Crown	2012–2016	BBC Two; PBS (United States)	co-production with Neal Street Productions, Carnival Films and WNET
The Real Housewives of Melbourne	2014–2021	Fox Arena	co-production with Matchbox Entertainment
The Real Housewives of Cheshire	2015–present	ITVBe	co-production with Universal Television Alternative Studio UK
You, Me and the Apocalypse	2015	Sky One; NBC (United States)	co-production with Sky UK, Working Title Television and BigBalls Films
London Spy	2015	BBC Two	co-production with Working Title Television and BBC America
Gone	2017–2018	TF1 (France); VOX (Germany)	co-production with The Colleton Company and The Neptune Way.
Tamara's World	2017	ITVBe	co-production with Monkey Kingdom
Suits South Korea	2018	KBS2	co-production with Monster Union and EnterMedia
Suits Japan	2018–present	Fuji TV	A Japanese adaptation of Suits created by Aaron Korsh; co-production with Kyodo Television
Hanna	2019–2021	Amazon Prime Video	co-production with Amazon Studios, Tomorrow Studios, Working Title Television and Focus Features; Based on the film of the same name by David Farr and Seth Lochhead
The Case Against Adnan Syed	2019	HBO	co-production with Working Title Television, HBO Documentary Films, Instinct Productions and Disarming Films
Tales of the City	2019	Netflix	co-production with Universal Television, Sweatpants Productions and Working Title Television
The Capture	2019–present	BBC One	co-production with Heyday Television
Fortunate Son	2020	CBC	co-production with Lark Productions and Seven24 Films
Transplant	2020–2024	CTV	co-production with Sphere Media and Bell Media
Pretty Hard Cases	2021–2023	CBC	co-production with Cameron Pictures
Creamiere	2021–present	TVNZ 2	co-production with Tony Ayres Productions, Flat 3 Productions and Kevin & Co.
Clickbait	2021	Netflix	co-production with Matchbox Pictures, Heyday Television and Tony Ayres Productions
Fires	2021	ABC TV	co-production with Matchbox Pictures and Tony Ayres Productions
Dodger	2022–present	CBBC	
Supertitlán	2022	Azteca 7	co-production with Dopamine
The Undeclared War	2022–present	Channel 4; Peacock (United States)	co-production with Playground Entertainment and Stonehedge Films
Everyone Else Burns	2023–present	Channel 4	co-production with Jax Media
One Day	2024	Netflix	co-production with Drama Republic and Focus Features
Allegiance	2024–present	CBC	co-production with Lark Productions
Law & Order Toronto: Criminal Intent	2024–present	CityTV	co-production with Lark Productions and Cameron Pictures; Based on the American TV series Law & Order: Criminal Intent by Dick Wolf
Apples Never Fall	2024	Peacock	co-production with Universal Content Productions, Heyday Television, Matchbox Pictures and Call Me Mel Productions Inc.
Too Much	2025	Netflix	co-production with Working Title Television and Good Thing Going Productions
All Her Fault	2025	Peacock	co-production with Carnival Films
Moral Injuries	TBA	TBA	co-production with Monumental Television
Dungeon Crawler Carl	TBA	TBA	co-production with Fuzzy Door Productions; Based on the novel of the same name by Matt Dinniman

=== Working Title Television ===
Title	Original run	Network	Notes
Further Tales of the Riverbank	1992	Channel 4	co-production with Delroy
Tales of the City	1993	Channel 4	co-production with Propaganda Films
The Baldy Man	1995–1998	ITV	co-production with Central Independent Television
More Tales of the City	1998	Channel 4/Showtime	co-production with Propaganda Films
Randall & Hopkirk (Deceased)	2000–2001	BBC One	
Further Tales of the City	2001	Channel 4/Showtime	co-production with BBR Productions and Équipe SPECTRA
The Tudors	2007–2010	Showtime; CBC Television; BBC Two	International distribution only with Sony Pictures Television, co-production with Reveille Eire, Octagon Films and Peace Arch Entertainment
Love Bites	2011	NBC	co-production with Open 4 Business Productions, Loud Blouse Productions and Universal Media Studios
True Love	2012	BBC One	
Yonderland	2013–2016	Sky One	
About a Boy	2014–2015	NBC	co-production with TriBeCa Productions and Universal Television. based on the 2002 film by Universal Pictures/StudioCanal
You, Me and the Apocalypse	2015	Sky One; NBC	co-production with BigBalls Films, Sky UK and NBCUniversal International Studios
London Spy	2015	BBC Two	co-production with NBCUniversal International Studios and BBC America
Gypsy	2017	Netflix	co-production with Rhythm Arts Entertainment, Pen and Paper Industries and Universal Television
Hanna	2019–2021	Amazon Prime Video	co-production with Amazon Studios, Tomorrow Studios, Focus Features and NBCUniversal International Studios; Based on the 2011 film of the same name by Focus Features
The Case Against Adnan Syed	2019	HBO	co-production with HBO Documentary Films, Instinct Productions, Disarming Films and NBCUniversal International Studios
Tales of the City	2019	Netflix	co-production with Sweatpants Productions, Universal Television and NBCUniversal International Studios
The Luminaries	2020	TVNZ 1/BBC One	co-production with Southern Light Pictures, TVNZ, Fremantle and Silver Reel
We Are Lady Parts	2021–2024	Channel 4 Peacock	
Everything I Know About Love	2022	BBC One	
Too Much	2025	Netflix	co-production with Working Title Television and Good Thing Going Productions

=== Chocolate Media ===
Title	Years	Network	Notes
Baggage	2012	Channel 4	
Raymond Blanc: How to Cook Well	2013	BBC Two	
The 21st Question	2014	ITV	
Driving School of Mum and Dad	2015	Sky One	
Inside Manchester's Midland Hotel	2015	Channel 5	
Great British Buildings: Restoration of the Year	2017	Channel 4	

=== Lark Productions ===
Title	Original run	Network	Notes
Gastown Gamble	2012	OWN	
The Real Housewives of Vancouver	2012–2013	Slice	
Motive	2013–2016	CTV	co-production with Foundation Partners
Crash Gallery	2015–2017	CBC	
The Real Housewives of Toronto	2017	Slice	
Paramedics: Life on the Line	2019	Knowledge Network	
Fortunate Son	2020	CBC	co-production with Universal International Studios and Seven24 Films
Farming for Love	2023–2024	CTV	
Allegiance	2024–present	CBC	co-production with Universal International Studios
Law & Order Toronto: Criminal Intent	2024–present	CityTV	co-production with Universal International Studios and Cameron Pictures; Based on the American TV series Law & Order: Criminal Intent by Dick Wolf

=== Matchbox Pictures ===
Title	Network	Years	Notes
Anatomy	ABC TV	2008–2013	
Darwin's Lost Paradise	—N/a	2009	Documentary
Saved	—N/a	2009	Tele-movie
My Place	ABC Me	2009–2011	
Miss South Sudan Australia	ABC TV	2010	
Leaky Boat	ABC TV	2011	
Sex: An Unnatural History	SBS	2011	
The Slap	ABC TV	2011	
The Straits	ABC TV	2012	
Underground: The Julian Assange Story	Network Ten	2012	Tele-movie
Next Stop Hollywood	ABC TV	2013	
Camp	NBC	2013	co-production with BermanBraun, Selfish Mermaid and Universal Television
Formal Wars	Seven Network	2013	
Zuzu & the Supernuffs	KidsCo	2013	
Nowhere Boys	ABC Me	2013–2018	
Young, Lazy and Driving Us Crazy	Seven Network	2014	
Old School	ABC TV	2014	
Devil's Playground	Showcase	2014	
The Real Housewives of Melbourne	Fox Arena	2014–2021	
The Slap US	NBC	2015	co-production with Universal Television, P+M Image Nation and Scratchpad Productions
Room 101	SBS	2015	
Maximum Choppage	ABC TV Plus	2015	
Deadline Gallipoli	Fox Showcase	2015	Limited series. Co-production with Full Clip Productions
Glitch	ABC TV	2015–2019	Second season co-production with Netflix
The Family Law	SBS	2016–2019	
Wanted	Seven Network	2016–2018	co-production with R&R Productions
Secret City	Fox Showcase	2016–2019	
The Real Housewives of Auckland	Bravo	2016	
The Real Housewives of Sydney	Arena; Binge	2017, 2023–2025	
Mustangs FC	ABC Me	2017–2020	
Australian Spartan	Seven Network	2018–2019	
Safe Harbour	SBS	2018	
Everyone's a Critic	ABC TV	2018	
The Heights	ABC TV	2019–2020	co-production with For Pete's Sake Productions
Stateless	ABC TV	2020	
Hungry Ghosts	SBS	2020	
Young Rock	NBC	2021–2023	co-production with World Wrestling Entertainment, Grit & Superstition, Fierce Baby Productions, Seven Bucks Productions and Universal Television
Clickbait	Netflix	2021	Co-production with Tony Ayres Productions, Heyday Television and NBCUniversal International Studios
Making It Australia	Network 10	2021	co-production with Eureka Productions
Fires	ABC TV	2021	co-production with Tony Ayres Productions and NBCUniversal International Studios
La Brea	NBC	2021–2024	co-production with Bad Apple, Keshet Studios and Universal Television
Joe vs. Carole	Peacock	2022	co-production with Universal Content Productions and Wondery
Irreverent	Netflix; Peacock	2022	
Bad Behaviour	Stan	2023	
Class of '07	Amazon Prime Video	2023	
Turn Up the Volume	ABC Me	2023	co-production with Film Camp
House of Gods	ABC TV	2024	

==== Tony Ayres Productions ====
Title	Network	Years	Notes
Creamerie	TVNZ 2	2021–present	Co-production with NBCUniversal International Studios, Kevin & Co. and Flat 3 Productions
Clickbait	Netflix	2021	co-production with Matchbox Pictures, Heyday Television and NBCUniversal International Studios
Fires	ABC TV	2021	co-production with Matchbox Pictures and NBCUniversal International Studios

=== Carnival Films ===
Title	Original run	Network	Notes
Sea of Souls	2004–2007	BBC One	co-production with BBC Scotland and Sony Pictures Television International
Hotel Babylon	2006–2009	BBC Four	
Midnight Man	2008	ITV	
Harley Street	2008	ITV	
Whitechapel	2009–2013	ITV	
The Philanthropist	2009	NBC	co-production with The Levinson/Fontana Company, Original Media and Universal Television
Material Girl	2010	BBC One	
Downton Abbey	2010–2015	ITV	co-production with Masterpiece
Any Human Heart	2010	Channel 4	
The Worricker Trilogy	2011–2014	BBC Two	co-production with NBCUniversal, Heyday Films, Runaway Fridge TV, Beagle Pug Films and Masterpiece
The Last Weekend	2012	ITV	
Murder on the Home Front	2013	ITV	
Dracula	2013–2014	NBC; Sky Living	co-production with Universal Television, Flame Ventures and Playground Entertainment
The 7.39	2014	BBC One	
The Last Kingdom	2015–2022	BBC Two/Netflix	
Stan Lee's Lucky Man	2016–2018	Sky One	co-production with POW! Entertainment
Jamestown	2017–2019	Sky One	
Belgravia	2020	ITV; Epix	
Belgravia: The Next Chapter	2024	MGM+	Sequel to Belgravia
The Day of the Jackal	2024–present	Sky Atlantic; Peacock	co-production with Sky Studios
Lockerbie: A Search for Truth	2025	Sky Atlantic; Peacock	co-production with Universal Content Productions and Sky Studios

=== Heyday Television ===
Title	Years	Network	Notes
The Long Song	2018	BBC One	
The InBetween	2019	NBC	co-production with Universal Television and Look at My New Bag
The Capture	2019–2022	BBC One	co-production with NBCUniversal International Studios
Clickbait	2021	Netflix	co-production with Matchbox Pictures, Tony Ayres Productions and NBCUniversal International Studios

=== Universal Television Alternative Studio UK ===
Title	Years	Network	Notes
Make My Day	2002–2003	Channel 4	co-production with SKA Films
Swag	2002–2004	Channel 5	co-production with SKA Films
Rather Good Videos	2003–2004	Channel 4	
Ed vs. Spencer	2004–2005	Sky One	
Favouritism	2005	Channel 4	
My Kind of Town	2005	ABC	co-production with Embassy Row and Greengrass Productions
Swinging	2005–2006	Channel 5	
Girls Aloud: Off the Record	2006	E4	co-production with Globe Productions
Whatever	2006	Channel 4	
The Charlotte Church Show	2006–2008	Channel 4	co-production with Chickflicks Productions
Fist of Zen	2007	MTV	
The Passions of Girls Aloud	2008	ITV2	co-production with Globe Productions
Man vs. Cartoon	2009	TruTV	co-production with Pilgrim Film & Television and Warner Horizon Television
Young, Dumb and Living Off Mum	2009–2011	BBC Three	
A Comedy Roast	2010–2011	Channel 4	
Made in Chelsea	2011–present	E4	
Home for the Holidays	2011	Channel 4	
Newlyweds: The First Year	2013–2016	Bravo	
Trust Me, I'm a Game Show Host	2013	TBS	co-production with One Three Media; Originally ordered at ABC
The Real Housewives of Cheshire	2015–present	ITVBe	co-production with Universal International Studios
In Bed with Jamie	2015–2017	E4	
TFI Friday	2015	Channel 4	co-production with STV Productions and Olga TV
The Question Jury	2016–2017	Channel 4	
Don't Hate the Playaz	2018–present	ITV2	
The Bi Life	2018	E!	
Ministry of Justice	2018	Channel 4	
Comedy Game Night	2018–present	Channel 5/Comedy Central UK	Previously known as Celebrity Game Night; Based on Hollywood Game Night created by Sean Hayes and Todd Milliner
Britain's Best Parent?	2020	Channel 4	
Celebrity Karaoke Club	2020–2022	ITV2	
The Emily Atack Show	2020–2022	ITV2	
The Real Housewives of Jersey	2020–2022	ITVBe	
The Complaints Department	2021–present	Comedy Central UK	
Rob Beckett's Undeniable	2021–present	Comedy Central UK	Previously titled "Fact Off"
That's My Jam	2022–2023	BBC One	co-production with Universal Television Alternative Studio
Know Your S***: Inside Our Guts	2023–present	Channel 4	
The Real Housewives of London	2025–present	Hayu	Third British installment in The Real Housewives franchise

=== Lucky Giant ===
Title	Years	Network	Notes
Family Tree	2013	BBC Two; HBO (United States)	co-production with NBCUniversal International Studios, Crystal Palace Entertainment and Pale Morning Dun Industries
Quacks	2017	BBC Two	co-production with Wellcome

== Universal Television Alternative Studio ==
Title	Years	Network	Notes
Weakest Link	2001–2003; 2020–present	NBC/Syndication	co-production with BBC Studios
Better Late Than Never	2016–2018	NBC	co-production with Storyline Entertainment, CJ E&M and Small World International Format Television
World of Dance	2017–2020	NBC	co-production with Nuyorican Productions
Making It	2018–2021	NBC	co-production with Paper Kite Productions, 3 Arts Entertainment and Open 4 Business Productions; Originally titled The Handmade Project
The Titan Games	2019–2020	NBC	co-production with A. Smith & Co. Productions and Seven Bucks Productions
Songland	2019–2020	NBC	co-production with Live Animals, Dave Stewart Entertainment and 222 Productions
Bring the Funny	2019	NBC	co-production with Just for Laughs and Open 4 Business Productions
Blind Date	2019–2020	Bravo	co-production with Bravo Media Productions
The Biggest Loser	2020	USA Network	co-production with Endemol Shine North America and USA Network Media Productions
Thanks A Millon	2020–present	Quibi/The Roku Channel	co-production with B17 Entertainment and Nuyorican Productions
Small Fortune	2021	NBC	co-production with Youngest Media
Capital One College Bowl	2021–2022	NBC	co-production with Richard Reid Productions, Tough Lamb Media and Village Roadshow Television
Clash of the Cover Bands	2021	E!	co-production with Electric Hot Dog
The Kids Tonight Show	2021	Peacock	co-production with Matador Content and Electric Hot Dog
That's My Jam	2021–present	NBC	co-production with Electric Hot Dog and Open 4 Business Productions
Baking It	2021–2023	Peacock	co-production with Paper Kite Productions, 3 Arts Entertainment and Open 4 Business Productions
American Song Contest	2022	NBC	co-production with Propagate Content; Based on Eurovision Song Contest
Dancing with Myself	2022	NBC	co-production with Irwin Entertainment and Shakira
Password	2022–present	NBC	co-production with Electric Hot Dog and Fremantle; A reboot of the 1960s game show by Bob Stewart and Mark Goodson-Bill Todman Productions
The End Is Nye	2022	Peacock	co-production with Universal Content Productions, Fuzzy Door Productions and Beetlecord Productions
That's My Jam UK	2022–2023	BBC One	co-production with Monkey Kingdom
The Gentle Art of Swedish Death Cleaning	2023–present	Peacock	co-production with Paper Kite Productions, Scout Productions and S M3 L Productions
LA Fire & Rescue	2023	NBC	co-production with Wolf Entertainment and 44 Blue Productions
Prosecuting Evil with Kelly Siegler	2023–present	Oxygen	co-production with Wolf Entertainment, Magical Elves and Green Lakes Productions
Face to Face with Scott Peterson	2024	Peacock	
Scare Tactics	2024	USA Network	co-production with Monkeypaw Productions and WMTI Productions
The Americas	2025	NBC	co-production with BBC Studios Natural History Unit
Destination X	2025–present	NBC	co-production with Twofour
Billionaire Boys Club	2025	CNN	co-production with Green Lakes Productions
Death Row Confidential: Secrets of a Serial Killer	2025–present	Oxygen	co-production with Wolf Entertainment, Fireside Pictures and Vanity Fair Studios
The Death Investigator with Barbara Butcher	2025–present	Oxygen	co-production with Wolf Entertainment and Alfred Street Industries

== Universal Animation Studios ==
Formerly known as Universal Cartoon Studios.

Title	Original run	Network	Notes
Back to the Future	1991–1992	CBS	co-production with Amblin Television, BIG Pictures, Zaloom/Mayfield Productions, based on the 1985 film and its sequels by Universal Pictures.
Fievel's American Tails	1992	CBS	co-production with Amblimation/Amblin Television/Nelvana, based on the 1986 film An American Tail and its sequels by Universal Pictures
Exosquad	1993–1994	Syndication	
Problem Child	1993–1994	USA Network	co-production with D'Ocon Films Productions (Season 1) / Lacewood Productions (Season 2) based on the 1990 film and its sequels by Universal Pictures
Monster Force	1994	Syndication	co-production with Lacewood Productions
Beethoven	1994	CBS	co-production with Northern Lights Entertainment, based on the 1992 film and its sequels by Universal Pictures
Earthworm Jim	1995–1996	Kids' WB	co-production with Shiny Entertainment and Flextech Television Limited
Savage Dragon	1995–1996	USA Network	co-production with Lacewood Productions (season 1), Studio B Productions (season 2), and P3 Entertainment
The Spooktacular New Adventures of Casper	1996–1998	Fox Kids	co-production with Amblin Television/The Harvey Entertainment Group, based on the 1995 film by Universal Pictures
Wing Commander Academy	1996	USA Network	based on the video game franchise Wing Commander by Origin Systems/Electronic Arts
Vor-Tech: Undercover Conversion Squad	1996	Syndication	co-produced by Lacewood Productions, Edition Dupuis France and Media Toon
The New Woody Woodpecker Show	1999–2002	Fox Kids	based on the character created by Walter Lantz
The Mummy	2001–2003	Kids' WB	co-production with The Sommers Company, Rough Draft Studios and Sunwoo Entertainment, based on the 1999 film and its sequel by Universal Pictures
Curious George	2006–2022	PBS Kids/Peacock	co-production with Imagine Entertainment and WGBH Boston (2006-2015) based on the 2006 film by Universal Pictures and Imagine Entertainment; Production transferred to Universal Pictures Home Entertainment and Universal Animation Studios for season 12 upon its move to Peacock
The Land Before Time	2007–2008	Cartoon Network	co-production with Amblin Entertainment, based on the 1988 film and its sequels by Universal Pictures
Woody Woodpecker (2018)	2018–2020	YouTube	co-production with Splash Entertainment and Universal Pictures Home Entertainment

== NBCUniversal Media, LLC ==
Title	Years	Network	Notes
American Ninja Warrior	2009–present	G4/NBC	co-production with A. Smith and Co. Productions, Lake Paradise Entertainment (2009–2013) and Tokyo Broadcasting System
Knife Fight	2013–2015	Esquire Network	co-production with Flower Films and Authentic Entertainment
The Getaway	2013–2014	Esquire Network	co-production with Zero Point Zero Production
The Girl in the Woods	2021	Peacock	co-production with Crypt TV

=== NBC News ===
- Project XX (1954–1970)
- Meet the Press Now (2022–present)

==== Peacock Productions ====
Title	Years	Network	Notes
Why Planes Crash	2009–2015	MSNBC	
Ministry of Evil: The Twisted Cult of Tony Alamo	2019	SundanceTV	co-production with World of Wonder
Killer Motive	2019–2021	Oxygen	
Relentless with Kate Snow	2019	Oxygen	

==== NBC News Studios ====
Title	Years	Network	Notes
John Wayne Gacy: Devil in Disguise	2021	Peacock	co-production with Witchcraft Motion Picture Company
The Thing About Pam	2022	NBC	co-production with Blumhouse Television, Weird Egg Productions and Big Picture Co.
The Hillside Strangler: Devil in Disguise	2022	Peacock	
Model America	2022	MSNBC	co-production with Anchor Entertainment and Psycho Films
Leguizamo Does America	2023–present	MSNBC	
Black Pop: Celebrating the Power of Black Culture	2023	E!	co-production with Unanimous Media

=== Peacock TV ===
Title	Original run	Network	Notes
Lost Speedways	2020	Peacock	co-production with Dirty Mo Media
John Wayne Gacy: Devil in Disguise	2021	Peacock	co-production with Witchcraft Motion Picture Company and NBC News Studios
Epstein's Shadow: Ghislaine Maxwell	2021	Peacock	co-production with Blue Ant Media, Sky and Altair Productions
Dr Death: The Undoctored Story	2021	Peacock	co-production with Universal Content Productions and Wondery
Olympic Highlights with Kevin Hart and Snoop Dogg	2021	Peacock	co-production with LOL Studios and Snoopadelic Films
Frogger	2021	Peacock	co-production with Eureka Productions and Konami Cross Media NY
Top Chef Family Style	2021	Peacock	co-production with Magical Elves Productions
Hart to Heart	2021–present	Peacock	co-production with LOL Studios
Backyard Blowout	2021	Peacock	co-production with Departure Films
Unidentified with Demi Lovato	2021	Peacock	co-production with Goodstory Productions and SB Projects
The Siwa Dance Pop Revolution	2021	Peacock	co-production with Evolution Media, Stinson Media and Team Siwa, Inc.
Poker Face	2023–2025	Peacock	produced by Zucks., Animal Pictures, T-Street, and MRC

=== Bravo Media Productions ===
Title	Original run	Network	Notes
Bravo Profiles	2000–2002	Bravo	
Queer Eye	2003–2007	Bravo	co-production with Scout Productions
The 100 Scariest Movie Moments	2004	Bravo	co-production with Kaufman Films
Top Chef	2006–present	Bravo	co-production with Magical Elves Productions
The Real Housewives of Orange County	2006–present	Bravo	co-production with Dunlop Entertainment, Kaufman Films (season 1), Wholly Cow Productions (season 1) and Evolution Media (season 2–present)
Million Dollar Listing Los Angeles	2006–2024	Bravo	co-production with World of Wonder
30 Even Scarier Movie Moments	2006	Bravo	co-production with Sharp Entertainment
Flipping Out	2007–2018	Bravo	co-production with Authentic Entertainment
The Millionaire Matchmaker	2008–2015	Bravo	co-production with Bayonne Entertainment and Intuitive Entertainment
The Real Housewives of New York City	2008–present	Bravo	co-production with Ricochet
The Real Housewives of Atlanta	2008–present	Bravo	co-production with Truly Original
Top Chef Masters	2009–2013	Bravo	co-production with Magical Elves Productions
The Real Housewives of New Jersey	2009–present	Bravo	co-production with Sirens Media
Watch What Happens Live with Andy Cohen	2009–present	Bravo	co-production with Embassy Row and Sony Pictures Television
13 Scarier Movie Moments	2009	Bravo	co-production with Sharp Entertainment
Bethenny Ever After	2010–2012	Bravo	co-production with Shed Media
The Real Housewives of D.C.	2010	Bravo	Half Yard Productions
The Real Housewives of Beverly Hills	2010–present	Bravo	co-production with Evolution Media
The Real Housewives of Miami	2011–present	Bravo/Peacock	co-production with Purveyors of Pop
Million Dollar Decorators	2011–2013	Bravo	co-production with Goodbye Pictures
Most Eligible Dallas	2011	Bravo	co-production with Pink Sneakers Productions
Fashion Hunters	2011	Bravo	co-production with Leftfield Pictures
Million Dollar Listing New York	2012–2021	Bravo	co-production with World of Wonder
Shahs of Sunset	2012–2021	Bravo	co-production with Ryan Seacrest Productions and Truly Original
Interior Therapy with Jeff Lewis	2012–2013	Bravo	co-production with Authentic Entertainment
Vanderpump Rules	2013–present	Bravo	co-production with Evolution Media
Married to Medicine	2013–present	Bravo	co-production with Fremantle and Purveyors of Pop
Below Deck	2013–present	Bravo	co-production with 51 Minds Entertainment
The People's Couch	2013–2016	Bravo	co-production with All3Media America and Studio Lambert
Thicker Than Water	2013–2016	Bravo	co-production with Sirens Media and John Doe Media
Blood, Sweat & Heels	2014–2015	Bravo	co-production with Leftfield Pictures
Southern Charm	2014–present	Bravo	co-production with Haymaker Productions
Ladies of London	2014–2017	Bravo	co-production with Adjacent Productions
Game of Crowns	2014	Bravo	co-production with Shed Media
Extreme Guide to Parenting	2014	Bravo	co-production with Punching In The Head Productions
The Singles Project	2014	Bravo	co-production with All3Media America, Lime Pictures and Goodbye Pictures
Manzo'd with Children	2014–2016	Bravo	co-production with Sirens Media
Euros of Hollywood	2014	Bravo	co-production with CORE Media Group and Bayonne Entertainment
Mother Funders	2015	Bravo	co-production with Wholly Cow Productions and True Entertainment
Après Ski	2015	Bravo	co-production with Tricon Films & Television and Tollbooth TV
Vanderpump Rules After Show	2015–2016	Bravo	co-production with Evolution Media
Work Out New York	2015–2016	Bravo	co-production with All3Media America and Lime Pictures
Then and Now with Andy Cohen	2015	Bravo	co-production with World of Wonder and Most Talkative Productions
The Real Housewives of Potomac	2016–present	Bravo	co-production with Truly Original
The Real Housewives of Dallas	2016–present	Bravo	co-production with Goodbye Pictures
There Goes the Motherhood	2016	Bravo	co-production with Magical Elves Productions
Below Deck Mediterranean	2016–present	Bravo	co-production with 51 Minds Entertainment
Married to Medicine: Houston	2016	Bravo	co-production with FremantleMedia North America and Purveyors of Pop
Summer House	2017–present	Bravo	co-production with Truly Original and Left Hook Media
A Night with My Ex	2017	Bravo	co-production with Twofour America
Vanderpump Rules: Jax & Brittany Take Kentucky	2017	Bravo	co-production with Evolution Media
Top Chef Junior	2017–2018	Universal Kids	co-production with Magical Elves Productions
Relative Success with Tabatha	2018	Bravo	co-production with All3Media America and Lime Pictures
Southern Charm New Orleans	2018–2019	Bravo	co-production with Invent TV
Kandi Koated Nights	2018	Bravo	co-production with Embassy Row, Sony Pictures Television, Kandi Koated Entertainment and TTucker Productions
Bravo's Play by Play	2018	Bravo	co-production with Embassy Row and Most Talkative Productions
Welcome to Waverly	2018	Bravo	co-production with Our House Media
Cash Cab	2019–2020	Bravo	co-production with Lion Television
Married to Medicine: Los Angeles	2019–2020	Bravo	co-production with Fremantle and Purveyors of Pop
Blind Date	2019–2020	Bravo	co-production with Universal Television Alternative Studio
Below Deck Sailing Yacht	2020–present	Bravo	co-production with Little Wooden Boat Productions and 51 Minds Entertainment
Family Karma	2020–2023	Bravo	co-production with Truly Original
The Real Housewives of Salt Lake City	2020–present	Bravo	co-production with Invent TV and Shed Media
Top Chef Amateurs	2021	Bravo	co-production with Magical Elves Productions
Vanderpump Dogs	2021	Peacock	co-production with Evolution Media
The Real Housewives Ultimate Girls Trip	2021–present	Peacock	co-production with Shed Media

=== G4 Media ===
Title	Original run	Network	Co-producer(s)
Blister	2002–2004	G4techTV	
Arena	2002–2005	G4techTV	
Cheat!	2002–2009	G4	
Cinematech	2002–2007	G4	
Filter	2002–2006	G4	
G4tv.com	2002–2005	G4	
Game On	2002	G4	
Icons	2002–2007	G4	
Judgment Day	2002–2006	G4	
Players	2002–2004	G4techTV	
Portal	2002–2004	G4techTV	
Pulse	2002–2004	G4techTV	
The Block	2007–2008	G4	

=== Wilshire Studios ===
Title	Years	Network	Notes
E! True Hollywood Story	1996–2021	E!	
Mysteries and Scandals	1998–2001; 2018	E! Oxygen	
The Soup	2004–2020	E!	co-production with Mission Control Media
Giuliana and Bill	2009–2014	Style Network/E!	co-production with You & I Productions
Baggage	2010–2015	Game Show Network	
Fashion Police	2010–2017	E!	
Ice and Coco	2011–2013	E!	
You Gotta See This	2012–2014	Nickelodeon/Nicktoons	co-production for Nickelodeon Productions
Chasing the Saturdays	2013	E!	co-production with Peter Engel Productions and Ambassador Entertainment
The Comment Section	2015	E!	co-production with Free Period and Pygmy Wolf Productions
Hacking Robot	2016	USA Network	co-production with USA Network Media Productions
The Cromarties	2017–2018	USA Network	co-production with USA Network Media Productions
Red Carpet Icons	2018	E!	co-production with E! Entertainment Television
Unspeakable Crime: The Killing of Jessica Chambers	2018	Oxygen	co-production with Third Eye Motion Picture Company, Buzzfeed Motion Pictures and Oxygen Media Productions
The Curious Creations of Christine McConnell	2018	Netflix	co-production with Regan Arts and Henson Alternative
Busy Tonight	2018–2019	E!	co-production with Little Stranger, Inc., Busy Bee Productions and E! Entertainment Television
Real Country	2018	USA Network	co-production with USA Network Media Productions
A Lie to Die For	2019	Oxygen	co-production with Oxygen Media Productions
Straight Up Steve Austin	2019–2021	USA Network	co-production with Steve Austin and USA Network Media Productions
The DNA of Murder with Paul Holes	2019–2020	Oxygen	

=== Sprout/Universal Kids Productions ===
Title	Original run	Network	Notes
The Good Night Show	2005–2017	Sprout	interstitial series
Musical Mornings with Coo	2007–2009	Sprout	interstitial series
Sprout Sharing Show	2008–2014	Sprout	interstitial series
Noodle and Doodle	2010–2013	Sprout	
The Chica Show	2012–2015	Sprout	
Nina's World	2015–2018	Universal Kids	co-production with Pipeline Studios
Terrific Trucks	2016–2017	Universal Kids	
Beat the Clock	2018–2019	Universal Kids	co-production with Fremantle
Get Out of My Room	2018–2019	Universal Kids	co-production with Departure Films
Norman Picklestripes	2019–2021	Universal Kids	co-production with Factory
Powerbirds	2020	Universal Kids	co-production with Brown Bag Films

== NBCUniversal Telemundo Enterprises ==
Title	Original run	Network	Notes
Caso Cerrado	2001–2019	Telemundo	
Don Francisco te invita	2016–2018	Telemundo	

=== Telemundo Studios ===
Title	Original run	Network	Notes
El magnate	1990	Telemundo	co-production with Capitalvision International Corporation
Amantes del Desierto	2001	Telemundo; Caracol Televisión	co-production with RTI Colombia
Adrián está de visita	2001–2002	Telemundo; Caracol Televisión	co-production with RTI Colombia
Amor Descarado	2003–2004	Telemundo	
Pasión de Gavilanes	2003–2022	Telemundo; Caracol Televisión (season 1)	co-production with RTI Producciones (season 1)
El alma herida	2003–2004	Telemundo	co-production with Argos Comunicación
Prisionera	2004	Telemundo	
Pecados ajenos	2007	Telemundo	
El Juramento	2008	Telemundo	
Doña Barbara	2008–2009	Telemundo	co-production with RTI Producciones and Sony Pictures Television
El Rostro de Analía	2008–2009	Telemundo	
Victorinos	2009–2010	Telemundo	co-production with RTI Producciones
Más sabe el diablo	2009–2010	Telemundo	
Perro Amor	2010	Telemundo	
El clon	2010	Telemundo; Caracol Televisión	co-production with RTI Producciones and Rede Globo
¿Dónde esta Elisa?	2010	Telemundo	
El fantasma de Elena	2010–2011	Telemundo	
La Diosa Coronada	2010	Telemundo; Caracol Televisión	co-production with RTI Producciones
Alguien te mira	2010–2011	Telemundo	
Aurora	2010–2011	Telemundo	
Eye for an Eye	2010–2011	Telemundo	co-production with RTI Colombia
Los herederos del Monte	2011	Telemundo	co-production with RTI Producciones
La Reina del Sur	2011–2023	Telemundo	co-production with RTI Producciones (season 1) and Netflix (season 2)
Mi corazón insiste en Lola Volcán	2011	Telemundo	
La casa de al lado	2011–2012	Telemundo	
Amar de Nuevo	2011–2012	Telemundo	co-production with Imagina US
Flor Salvaje	2011–2012	Telemundo	co-production with RTI Producciones
Una Maid en Manhattan	2011–2012	Telemundo	co-production with Sony Pictures Television
Relaciones Peligrosas	2012	Telemundo	
Corazón Valiente	2012–2013	Telemundo	
Rosa Diamante	2012–2013	Telemundo	co-production with Argos Comunicación
El Rostro de la Venganza	2012–2013	Telemundo	
La Patrona	2013	Telemundo	co-production with Argos Comunicación
Pasión Prohibida	2013	Telemundo	
El Señor de los Cielos	2013–2024	Telemundo	co-production with Argos Comunicación and Caracol Internacional (season 1)
Marido en Alquiler	2013–2014	Telemundo	co-production with Rede Globo
Dama y obrero	2013	Telemundo	
La Impostora	2014	Telemundo	co-production with Argos Comunicación
Part of Me	2014	Telemundo	
Reina de corazones	2014	Telemundo	
Santa Diabla	2013–2014	Telemundo	
Senora Acero	2014–2019	Telemundo	co-production with Argos Comunicación
Los Miserables	2014–2015	Telemundo	co-production with Argos Comunicación
Tierra de reyes	2014–2015	Telemundo	
Dueños del paraíso	2015	Telemundo	co-production with Televisión Nacional de Chile
Bajo el mismo cielo	2015–2016	Telemundo	
¿Quién es quién?	2015–2016	Telemundo	
La querida del Centauro	2016–2017	Telemundo	co-production with Sony Pictures Television and Teleset
Eva la Trailera	2016	Telemundo	
Silvana sin lana	2016–2017	Telemundo	
Sin senos sí hay paraíso	2016–2018	Telemundo	co-production with Fox Telecolombia
La Doña	2016–2020	Telemundo	co-production with Argos Comunicación
El Chema	2016–2017	Telemundo	co-production with Argos Comunicación
La Fan	2017	Telemundo	
Guerra de ídolos	2017	Telemundo	co-production with Fox Telecolombia, Estudios TeleMéxico and Netflix
Mariposa de Barrio	2017	Telemundo	co-production with Jenni Rivera Enterprises
Milagros de Navidad	2017	Telemundo	
Sangre de mi tierra	2017–2018	Telemundo	
José José, el príncipe de la canción	2018	Telemundo	co-production with Estudios TeleMéxico
Al otro lado del muro	2018	Telemundo	co-production with Argos Comunicación
Enemigo íntimo	2018–2020	Telemundo	co-production with Argos Comunicación
Mi familia perfecta	2018	Telemundo	
Falsa Identidad	2018–2021	Telemundo	co-production with Argos Comunicación
El Barón	2019	Telemundo	co-production with Sony Pictures Television
Betty en NY	2019	Telemundo	
Preso No. 1	2019	Telemundo	co-production with Keshet International and Argos Comunicación
El final del paraíso	2019	Telemundo	co-production with Fox Telecolombia
Decisiones: Unos ganan, otros pierden	2019–2020	Telemundo	co-production with Argos Comunicación and Cinemat
Operación Pacífico	2020	Telemundo	co-production with Fox Telecolombia
100 días para enamorarnos	2020–2021	Telemundo	
La suerte de Loli	2021	Telemundo	
Buscando a Frida	2021	Telemundo	co-production with Argos Comunicación
Malverde: El Santo Patrón	2021–2022	Telemundo	co-production with EFD Internacional
Parientes a la fuerza	2021–2022	Telemundo	co-production with Punta Fina and 11:11 Films & TV
Juego de mentiras	2023	Telemundo	Originally titled Cuplable o inocente
Vuelve a mí	2023–2024	Telemundo	
El doctor del pueblo	2023–2024	Telemundo	Originally titled El doctor de los milagros
El Conde: Amor y honor	2024	Telemundo	co-production with Sony Pictures Television

==== Telemundo International Studios ====
Title	Original run	Network	Notes
The Inmate	2018	Telemundo; Netflix	
Playing with Fire	2019	Telemundo; Netflix	co-production with Rede Globo; Based on the Brazilian miniseries Amores Roubados by George Moura
You Cannot Hide	2019	Telemundo; Netflix	co-production with Isla Audiovisual
Dime Quién Soy: Mistress of War	2020–2021	Movistar+ Peacock	co-production with DOL Producciones and Beta Film
El Inmortal. Gangs of Madrid	2021	Movistar+	co-production with DOL Producciones
Natural Born Narco	2022	The Roku Channel	

==== Telemundo Streaming Studios ====
Title	Years	Network	Notes
Diary of a Gigolo	2022	Netflix	co-production with Underground Producciones
'Til Jail Do Us Part	2022	Peacock	
El Secreto de la Familia Greco	2022	Telemundo	co-production with Underground Producciones

==== Underground Producciones ====
Title	Original run	Network	Notes
Amo de Casa	2006	El Nueve	
Gladiadores de Pompeya	2006	El Nueve	
El Tiempo no para	2006	El Nueve	
Lalola	2007–2008	América TV	
Botineras	2009–2010	Telefe	co-production with Telefe Contenidos and Endemol
Educando a Nina	2016	Telefe	co-production with Telefe Contenidos
Fanny la Fan	2017	Telefe	
100 días para enamorarse	2018	Telefe	co-production with Telefe Contenidos
Diary of a Gigolo	2022	Netflix	co-production with Telemundo Streaming Studios
El Secreto de la Familia Greco	2022	Telemundo	co-production with Telemundo Streaming Studios

== Versant Media ==
Title	Original run	Network	Notes
Killer Contact	2013	Syfy	produced by Pilgrim Films and Television and Syfy Media Productions
HarmonQuest	2017–2019	VRV	seasons 2-3; produced by Harmonious Claptrap, Starburns Industries, Universal Content Productions, and Syfy Media Productions (owner)

=== Oxygen Media Productions ===
Title	Original run	Network	Notes
Snapped	2004–present	Oxygen	co-production with Jupiter Entertainment
Campus Ladies	2006–2007	Oxygen	co-production with Principato-Young Entertainment
Bad Girls Club	2006–2017	Oxygen	co-production with Bunim/Murray Productions
Tori & Dean: Home Sweet Hollywood	2007–2012	Oxygen	co-production with World of Wonder and Life in the Bowl Productions
Fight Girls	2007	Oxygen	co-production with Mess Media
Deion & Pilar: Prime Time Love	2008	Oxygen	co-production with Primetime Media Ventures, Toolbooth TV and SokoLobi Entertainment
Running Russell Simmons	2010	Oxygen	co-production with Picture This Television and Simmons-Lathan Media Group
All About Aubrey	2011	Oxygen	co-production with Ish Entertainment
The World According to Paris	2011	Oxygen	co-production with Paris Hilton Entertainment and A. Smith & Co. Productions
The Glee Project	2011–2012	Oxygen	co-production with Embassy Row and Ryan Murphy Productions
Snapped: Killer Couples	2013–present	Oxygen	co-production with Jupiter Entertainment
Preachers of L.A.	2013–2014	Oxygen	co-production with L. Plummer Media and Relevé Entertainment
Celebrities Undercover	2014	Oxygen	co-production with T Group Productions and Wendy Williams Productions
Street Art Throwdown	2015	Oxygen	co-production with Embassy Row, Sony Pictures Television and Ugly Pretty Productions
Preachers of Detroit	2015	Oxygen	co-production with L. Plummer Media, Relevé Entertainment and Relativity Television
Boss Nails	2015	Oxygen	co-production with Jarrett Creative and Rock Shrimp Productions
Snapped: She Made Me Do It	2015–2016	Oxygen	co-production with Joke Productions
Preachers of Atlantia	2016	Oxygen	co-production with L. Plummer Media and Relevé Entertainment
Living with Funny	2016	Oxygen	co-production with L. Plummer Media
Douglas Family Gold	2016	Oxygen	co-production with WV Enterprises and Lionsgate Television
Strut	2016	Oxygen	co-production with 44 Blue Productions, One Hoe Productions and Thigh High Productions
Homicide for the Holidays	2016–2019	Oxygen	co-production with Emerge Pictures and Jarrett Creative
Three Days to Live	2017	Oxygen	co-production with Joke Productions and Lusid Media
Unprotected	2017	Oxygen	co-production with Propagate Content
The Jury Speaks	2017	Oxygen	co-production with Glass Entertainment Group
The Disappearance of Natalie Holloway	2017	Oxygen	co-production with Brian Graden Media
Mysteries and Scandals	2018	Oxygen	co-productioh with Wilshire Studios
Final Appeal	2018	Oxygen	co-production with Peacock Productions
Aaron Hernandez: Uncovered	2018	Oxygen	co-production with MA Film Office and Renegade 83
Abuse of Power	2018	Oxygen	co-production with Lucky8 TV and Storyville Entertainment
The Case of: Caylee Anthony	2018	Oxygen	co-production with XG Productions and Critical Content
A Wedding and A Murder	2018–2019	Oxygen	co-production with Leepson Bounds Productions
Buried in the Backyard	2018–2021	Oxygen	co-production with Renegade 83
In Defense Of	2018	Oxygen	co-production with Magical Elves Productions
The Disappearance of Crystal Rogers	2018	Oxygen	co-production with Peacock Productions
Unspeakable Crime: The Killing of Jessica Chamber	2018	Oxygen	co-production with Wilshire Studios, Third Eye Motion Picture Company and Buzzfeed Motion Pictures
Smiley Face Killers: The Hunt for Justice	2019	Oxygen	co-production with 44 Blue Productions and Blumhouse Television
Mark of a Killer	2019–present	Oxygen	co-production with Jarrett Creative and Motiv8 Media
Deadly Cults	2019–2020	Oxygen	co-production with The Intellectual Property Corporation and Eureka Productions
The Disappearance of Susan Cox Powell	2019	Oxygen	co-production with Texas Crew Productions and EveryWhere Studios
A Lie to Die For	2019	Oxygen	co-production with Wilshire Studios
Killer Motive	2019–2021	Oxygen	co-production with Peacock Productions
Relentless with Kate Snow	2019	Oxygen	co-production with Peacock Productions
Killer Siblings	2019–2021	Oxygen	co-production with Scott Sternberg Productions

=== E! Entertainment Television ===
Title	Original run	Network	Notes
E! News	1991–2020	E!	
Talk Soup	1991–2002	E!	
E! True Hollywood Story	1996–2021	E!	co-production with Wilshire Studios
Celebrity Profile	1997–2001	E!	
Wild On!	1997–2003	E!	
Revealed with Jules Asner	2001–03	E!	
The Look for Less	2001–2003	Esquire Network	
The Anna Nicole Show	2002–2004	E!	
Star Dates	2002–2003	E!	
The Michael Essany Show	2003–2004	E!	
Celebrities Uncensored	2003–2004	E!	
Whose Wedding Is It Anyway?	2003–2010	Style	
Clean House	2003–2011	Style	
The Soup	2004–2020	E!	Wilshire Studios and Mission Control Media
Dr. 90210	2004–2008; 2020	E!	
How Do I Look?	2004–2012	Style	Left-Right Productions
The Gastineau Girls	2005–2006	E!	
Taradise	2005–2006	E!	
Sunset Tan	2007–2008	E!	Intuitive Entertainment
Chelsea Lately	2007–2014	E!	Borderline Amazing Productions
Keeping Up with the Kardashians	2007–2021	E!	co-production with Bunim/Murray Productions and Ryan Seacrest Productions
Ruby	2008–2012	Esquire Network	Gay Rosenthal Productions
Kourtney and Kim Take Miami	2009–2013	E!	co-production with Bunim/Murray Productions and Ryan Seacrest Productions
Jerseylicious	2010–2014	Style	Endemol USA
Fashion Police	2010–2017	E!	co-production with Wilshire Studios
Kourtney and Kim Take New York	2011–2012	E!	co-production with Ryan Seacrest Productions and Bunim/Murray Productions
After Lately	2011–2013	E!	Borderline Amazing Productions
Khloé & Lamar	2011–2012	E!	Ryan Seacrest Productions and Bunim/Murray Productions
Big Rich Texas	2011–2013	Esquire Network	Fly on the Wall Productions
Glam Fairy	2011–2012	Style	Endemol USA
Mrs. Eastwood & Company	2012	E!	Bunim/Murray Productions
Opening Act	2012	E!	Nigel Lythgoe Productions
Chicagolicious	2012–2013	Style	Endemol USA
Married to Jonas	2012–2013	E!	Ryan Seacrest Productions
Chasing the Saturdays	2013	E!	
Playing with Fire	2013	E!	Atlas Media Corp.
What Would Ryan Lochte Do?	2013	E!	co-production with Intuitive Entertainment and Wright Entertainment and Sports
The Wanted Life	2013	E!	co-production with Global TV UK, Ryan Seacrest Productions and SB Productions
Total Divas	2013–2019	E!	co-production with Bunim/Murray Productions and WWE
Eric & Jessie: Game On	2013–2014; 2017	E!	
Party On	2013–2014	E!	
Rich Kids of Beverly Hills	2014–2016	E!	co-production with ITV Studios America, Gennfier Gardiner TV and Leepson Bounds Entertainment
Escape Club	2014	E!	
Botched	2014–2024	E!	co-production with Evolution Media
The Comment Section	2015	E!	co-production with Wilshire Studios, Pygmy Wolf Productions and Free Period
Christina Milian Turned Up	2015–2016	E!	co-production with Banca Studio, G3 Production and Lionsgate Television
Good Work	2015	E!	co-production with World of Wonder
Total Bellas	2016–2021	E!	co-production with Bunim/Murray Productions and WWE
Daily Pop	2017–2022	E!	
Second Wives Club	2017	E!	co-production with All3Media America and Lime Pictures
Ashlee+Evan	2018	E!	
Red Carpet Icons	2018	E!	Wilshire Studios
Busy Tonight	2018–2019	E!	Little Stranger, Inc., Busy Bee Productions and Wilshire Studios
Nightly Pop	2018–2022	E!	
Celebrity Game Face	2020–present	E!	co-production with Hartbeat Productions and Critical Content
10 Things You Don't Know	2020	E!	co-production with Jupiter Entertainment
Overserved with Lisa Vanderpump	2021	E!	co-production with Evolution Media

=== USA Network Media Productions ===
Title	Original run	Network	Co-production with
Calliope	1978–1993	USA Network	
USA Tuesday Night Fights	1982–1998	USA Network	
Commander USA's Groovie Movies	1985–1989	USA Network	
USA Up All Night	1989–1998	USA Network	
Summer Camp	2013	USA Network	Fly Off the Wall Entertainment and Sony Pictures Television
Chrisley Knows Best	2014–2023	USA Network	Maverick Television and All3Media America
Hacking Robot	2016	USA Network	Wilshire Studios
Big Star Little Star	2017	USA Network	Curly One Productions and ITV Entertainment
According to Chrisley	2017	USA Network	Curly One Productions, Maverick Television and All3Media America
The Cromaties	2017–2018	USA Network	Wilshire Studios
The Secret Life of Kids	2018	USA Network	Banijay Studios North America
Miz & Mrs	2018–2022	USA Network	Bunim/Murray Productions and WWE
American Ninja Warrior Junior	2018–2021	Universal Kids/Peacock	A Smith & Co. Productions and Tokyo Broadcasting System
Real Country	2018	USA Network	Wilshire Studios
Temptation Island	2019–2023	USA Network	Banijay Studios North America
Growing Up Chrisley	2019–2022	USA Network	Maverick Television and All3Media America
Straight Up Steve Austin	2019–2021	USA Network	Wilshire Studios and Steve Austin
Cannonball	2020	USA Network	ITV Entertainment and ITV Studios

=== USA Sports ===
- USA Sports (1977–2007) § Programs throughout the years
- NBC Sports on USA Network § Programming

=== CNBC/MSNBC ===
CNBC

- Market Wrap (1989–2002)
- The Money Wheel (1989–1998)
- Steals and Deals (1990–1997)
- Today's Business (1994–2002)
- Squawk Box (1995–present)
- Power Lunch (1996–present)
- Street Signs (1996–2002, 2003–2015)
- Bull Session (1997–1998)
- Business Center (1997–2003)
- Market Watch (1998–2002)
- America Now (2001–2002)
- Morning Call (2002–2007)
- Wake Up Call (2002–2005)
- Closing Bell (2002–present)
- Kudlow & Cramer (2002–2005)
- The News on CNBC (2002–2004)
- Bullseye (2003–2005)
- Kudlow & Company (2005–2008)
- Mad Money (2005–present)
- On the Money (2005–2007, 2008–2009)
- Squawk on the Street (2005–present)
- Worldwide Exchange (2005–present)
- Fast Money (2006–present)
- The Call (2007–2011)
- Squawk Alley (2014–2021)
- TechCheck (2021–23)

MSNBC

- Hardball with Chris Matthews (1994–2020)
- MSNBC Live (1996–present)
- The News with Brian Williams (1996–2002)
- The Site (1996–1997)
- The Edge (1997–2002)
- Andrea Mitchell Reports (2000–present)
- The Abrams Report (2001–2006)
- Alan Keyes Is Making Sense (2002)
- Buchanan & Press (2002–2003)
- Donahue (2002–2003)
- Jesse Ventura's America (2003)
- Scarborough Country (2003–2007)
- Morning Joe First Look (2004–2020)
- Connected: Coast to Coast (2005)
- MSNBC at the Movies (2005)
- Rita Cosby: Live & Direct (2005–2006)
- Tucker (2005–2008)
- Weekends with Maury and Connie (2006)
- The Most with Alison Stewart (2006–2007)
- Your Business (2006–2018)
- Morning Joe (2007–present)
- Verdict with Dan Abrams (2007–2008)
- 1600 Pennsylvania Avenue (2008–2009)
- Dateline on ID (2008–2017)
- The Rachel Maddow Show (2008–present)
- Andrea Mitchell Reports (2008–present)
- Caught on Camera (2008–present)
- Dr. Nancy (2009)
- The Dylan Ratigan Show (2009–2012)
- The Ed Show (2009–2015)
- The Kudlow Report (2009–2014)
- Why Planes Crash (2009–2015)
- Way Too Early with Kasie Hunt (2009–2016; 2020–present)
- Disappeared (2009–2018)
- Jansing and Company (2010–2014)
- True Crime with Aphrodite Jones (2010–2016)
- NewsNation with Tamron Hall (2010–2018)
- Beyond The Headlines (2010–2020)
- The Last Word with Lawrence O'Donnell (2010–present)
- Killer Instinct (2011)
- Twist of Fate (2011–2012)
- Martin Bashir (2011–2013)
- Weather Caught on Camera (2011–2014)
- Now with Alex Wagner (2011–2015)
- Alex Witt Reports (2011–present)
- From the Edge with Peter Lik (2011)
- PoliticsNation with Al Sharpton (2011–present)
- Up (2011–2016; 2018–2020)
- Fatal Encounters (2012–2013)
- Caught on Camera Presents the Hitmen Tapes (2012–2015)
- The Cycle (2012–2015)
- Melissa Harris-Perry (2012–2016)
- All In with Chris Hayes (2013–present)
- Disrupt with Karen Finney (2013–2014)
- Up Late with Alec Baldwin (2013)
- The Presidents' Gatekeepers (2013) (co-production with CCWHIP Productions and Goldfish Pictures)
- More (2013) (co-production with Prospect Park and Tomorrow Productions)
- More All My Children (2013) (co-production with Prospect Park and Tomorrow Productions)
- More One Life to Move (2013) (co-production with Prospect Park and Tomorrow Productions)
- I'd Kill for You (2013–2016)
- Dead of Night (2013–2016)
- Deadline: Crime with Tamron Hall (2013–2019)
- Partners in Crime (2014)
- The Reid Report (2014–2015)
- Ronan Farrow Daily (2014–2015)
- Caught on Camera with Nick Cannon (2014–2016)
- Behind Closed Doors: Shocking Secrets (2015)
- Unraveled (2015–2016)
- Meet the Press Daily (2015–2022)
- Dateline Extra (2016–2018)
- Behind Closed Doors (2016–2019)
- The 11th Hour (2016–present)
- Hate in America (2016)
- For the Record with Greta (2017)
- Behind Closed Doors: The American Family (2017)
- Navy SEALs: America's Secret Warriors (2017–2018)
- Deadline: White House (2017–present)
- Hugh Hewitt (2017–present)
- Dateline: Secrets Uncovered (2017–present)
- Kasie DC (2017–present)
- Final Appeal (2018) (co-production with Oxygen Media Productions)
- The Disappearance of Crystal Rogers (2018) (co-production with Oxygen Media Productions)
- Saturday Night Politics with Donny Deutsch (2019)
- Relentless with Kate Snow (2019) (co-production with Oxygen Media Productions)
- Ministry of Evil: The Twisted Cult of Tony Alamo (2019)
- American Swamp (2019)
- Killer Motive (2019–2021)
- Velshi (2020–present)
- The Overview (2021–present)

== NBCUniversal Syndication Studios ==
Title	Original run	Network	Notes
On The Money	1970–2019	CNBC/Syndication	formerly as The Wall Street Journal Report (1970–2013)
In Search of...	1977–1982; 2002	Syndication; Sci Fi	distributor; produced by Alan Landsburg Productions
Sally	1983–2002	Syndication	continued from Multimedia Entertainment and Universal Television Entertainment
The George Michael Sports Machine	1984–2007	WRC-TV; Syndication	Produced by WRC-TV; previously distributed by ITC Entertainment (1991–95), Group W Productions (1995), Eyemark Entertainment (1995–2000) and KingWorld (2000–01)
Jerry Springer	1991–2018	Syndication	continued from Multimedia Entertainment, Universal Television, and Studios USA. produced by Richard Dominick Productions (Season 17).
Maury	1991–2022	Syndication	produced by MoPo Productions and Faulhaber Media (2009–2022); NBCU assumed distribution beginning in 1998; pre-1998 episodes distributed by Paramount Television owned by CBS Media Ventures
Access Hollywood	1996–2026	Syndication	previously distributed by 20th Television (1997–1999) and Warner Bros. Domestic Television Distribution (1999–2001)
Crossing Over with John Edward	1999–2004	Syndication	distribution continued from Studios USA
Blind Date	1999–2006	Syndication	co-production with Gold Coast Television Entertainment
Arrest & Trial	2000–2001	Syndication	co-production with Wolf Films
Fear Factor	2001–2006; 2011	NBC	Distribution for off-network syndication only; produced by Pulse Creative, Evolution Media (season 1) and Endemol USA.
The 5th Wheel	2001–2004	Syndication	produced by Bobwell Productions (Renegade Division)
The Other Half	2001–2003	Syndication	co-produced by Blanki & Bodi Productions and Fisher Entertainment
The Chris Matthews Show	2002–2013	Syndication	
The John Walsh Show	2002–2004	Syndication	
Starting Over	2003–2006	Syndication	co-production with Bunim/Murray Productions
The Jane Pauley Show	2004–2005	Syndication	produced by Michael Weisman Productions and Polliwog Media
Your Total Health	2004–2008	Syndication	
The Biggest Loser	2004–2016	NBC	produced by 3 Ball Productions (2004–2012), 25/7 Productions and Reveille Productions/Shine America/Endemol Shine North America
Deal or No Deal	2005–2010	NBC/Syndication	produced by Endemol USA
The Martha Stewart Show	2005–2012	Syndication/Hallmark Channel	produced by Mark Burnett Productions and MSLO Productions; Distributed outside of the U.S. by Fremantle
The Megan Mullally Show	2006–2007	Syndication	produced by Curly One Productions
1 vs. 100	2006–2008	NBC	produced by Endemol USA
The Steve Wilkos Show	2007–2026	Syndication	produced by Stamford Media Center Productions. Spinoff of Jerry Springer
Lyons & Bailes Reel Talk	2007–2009	Syndication	
Ghost Hunters International	2008–12	Syfy	produced by Pilgrim Films & Television
Estate of Panic	2008	Sci Fi	produced by Endemol USA
The Brian McKnight Show	2009–2010	Syndication	
Ghost Hunters Academy	2009–10	Syfy	produced by Pilgrim Films & Television
Access Daily	2010–2026	Syndication	
Mrs. Brown's Boys	2011–present	RTÉ/BBC	co-production with BBC Studios Comedy Productions, BBC Scotland, BOC-PIX and Raidio Teilifis Élreann; Distributed outside of North America by BBC Studios
America's Next Great Restaurant	2011	NBC	co-production with Magical Elves, Inc.
Steve Harvey	2012–2017	Syndication	produced by Endemol USA (2012–2014); Endemol Shine North America (2014–2017) with Nu Opp Inc. (2012–2015) (seasons 1–3), E. 112th St. Productions (2015–2017) (seasons 4–5) and A Better Machine Productions
Stars Earn Stripes	2012	NBC	produced by One Three Media, Wolf Reality LLC and Bill's Market & Television Productions
The Trisha Goddard Show	2012–2014	Syndication	produced by Faulhaber Media
Motive	2013–2016	CTV Television Network/ABC/USA Network	distributor; produced by Foundation Features, Lark Productions and Bell Media
The Meredith Vieira Show	2014–2016	Syndication	co-production with Meredith Vieira Productions
Crazy Talk	2015–2016	Syndication	produced by Faulhaber Media
The Expanse	2015–2022	Syfy/Amazon Prime Video	produced by Penguin in a Parka, SeanDanielCo (seasons 1–3; 2015–2018), Just So (seasons 4–present; 2019–present), Hivemind (seasons 4–present; 2019–present), Amazon Studios (seasons 4–present; 2019–present), and Alcon Entertainment; NBCU stopped international distribution after Syfy cancelled the series, international distribution of the series is now transferred to Legendary Television Distribution.
S.T.R.O.N.G.	2016	NBC	co-production with 25/7 Productions, Lake Paradise Entertainment and Sony Pictures Television
Harry	2016–2018	Syndication	co-production with HC Productions, Kurtzy Productions and Strangel Bros. Productions
Dateline	2017–present	NBC	re-cuts of true crime episodes for syndication
Steve	2017–2019	Syndication/Facebook Watch	co-production with SH Productions, IMG Original Content (2017–2019) (seasons 1–2) and Endeavor Content (2019) (season 2)
Papaya Bull	2017–2018	Nickelodeon Brazil	as NBCUniversal International Distribution; co-production with Boutique Filmes and Ancine
Culinary Bluprint	2018	N/A	Distributor during NBCU's ownership of Craftsy (formerly Bluprint); Currently owned by TN Marketing
The Kelly Clarkson Show	2019–2026	Syndication	
Judge Jerry	2019–2022	Syndication	
All Access	2019–2021	Syndication	
The Capture	2019–present	BBC One/Peacock	distributor; Produced by Heyday Television for the BBC
Karamo	2022–2026	Syndication	

=== Multimedia Entertainment ===
Title	Years	Network	Notes
The Phil Donahue Show/Donahue	1970–1996	Syndication	
Young People's Specials	1984–1985	Syndication	
Sweethearts	1988–1989	Syndication	
The $100,000 Pyramid	1991	Syndication	Distribution for season 2 only Produced by Stewart Tele Enterprises
Rush Limbaugh: The Television Show	1992–1996	Syndication	Produced by Ailes Productions, Inc. and Rush Limbaugh Productions
The Dennis Prager Show	1994–1995	Syndication	
The Susan Powter Show	1994–1995	Syndication	co-production with Woody Fraser Productions and Katz-Rush Entertainment

=== Universal Worldwide Television/Visual Programming ===
Formerly PolyGram Television from 1997-1999 and ITC Entertainment from 1955-1997.

Title	Years	Network	Notes
Fallen Angels	1993–1995	Showtime	produced by Mirage Enterprises and Propaganda Films
Earth: Final Conflict	1997–2002	CTV/NewNet; Syndication	Non-US/Canadian TV and home media distribution to first two seasons produced by Alliance Atlantis, Roddenberry/Kirschner Productions and Tribune Entertainment
The Crow: Stairway to Heaven	1998–1999	Syndication	Distribution outside of Canada co-produced with Alliance Atlantis and Crescent Entertainment
Motown Live	1998–1999	Syndication	
Total Recall: 2070	1999–2000	Syndication	Distribution outside of Canada co-produced with Alliance Atlantis, WIC Entertainment and TEAM Communications Group
Maisy	1999–2000	ITV	co-production with King Rollo Films
Sitting Ducks	2001–2003	Cartoon Network	co-production with The Krislin Company, Creative Capers Entertainment, Krislin/Elliot Digital and Sitting Ducks Productions

== DreamWorks Classics ==
Title	Years	Network	Notes
Roger Ramjet	1965	Syndication	produced by Pantomime Pictures and Hero Entertainment
Postman Pat	1981–1982; 1996–1997; 2004–2008; 2013–2017	BBC One; CBeebies	continued from Woodland Animations and Entertainment Rights co-production with Cosgrove Hall Films (2004–2008) and Mackinnon and Saunders (2013–2017)
Voltron	1984–1985	Syndication	produced by World Events Productions
Noddy's Toyland Adventures	1992–1994; 2000	BBC One/BBC Two	produced by Cosgrove Hall Films and Enid Blyton Ltd.
Theodore Tugboat	1993–2001	CBC Television	produced by Cochran Entertainment
Voltron: The Third Dimension	1998–2000	Syndication	produced by World Events Productions, Netter Digital Entertainment, Mike Young Productions and The Summit Media Group
Make Way for Noddy	2002–2007	Channel 5 PBS Kids	produced by Chorion and SD Entertainment
Gerald McBoing-Boing	2005–2007	Cartoon Network; Teletoon	co-production with Cookie Jar Entertainment
George of the Jungle	2007–2008; 2016–2017	Teletoon	co-production with Bullwinkle Studios, Studio B Productions (season 1), Switch Animation (season 2), August Media (season 2) and August Rights (season 2)
Lassie's Pet Vet	2007	PBS	co-production with Popular Arts Entertainment
Olivia	2009–2015	Nickelodeon	co-production with Brown Bag Films
Casper's Scare School	2009–2012	TF1; Cartoon Network	co-production with Harvey Entertainment, MoonScoop and DQ Entertainment
Noddy in Toyland	2009	Channel 5	co-production with Brown Bag Films
Guess with Jess	2009–2010	CBeebies	continued from Entertainment Rights co-production with Nelvana
Tinga Tinga Tales	2010–2011	CBeebies	co-production with Tiger Aspect Productions and Homeboyz Animation
My Life Me	2010–2011	Teletoon; France 2	co-production with OD Media and Carpediem Film & Television
Raa Raa the Noisy Lion	2011–2018	CBeebies	continued from Chapman Entertainment co-production with Mackinnon & Saunders
Voltron Force	2011–2012	Nicktoons	co-production with World Events Productions and Kickstart Productions
The Owl and Co	2014–2016	France 3	co-production with Studio Hari
Team Franco	2014	Beyond TV	co-production with Formula One Entertainment, DQ Entertainment and Telegael
The New Adventures of Lassie	2014–2020	TF1; ZDF (Germany)	co-production with Superprod Animation, DQ Entertainment and ZDF Enterprises
Mr. Magoo	2019–2023	France 4	co-production with Xilam Animation
Underdog and the Canine Defenders	2025–present	Gulli & M6; Rai Gulp (Italy)	co-production with Superprod Animation, Red Monk Studio and DeAPlaneta Entertainment; A reboot of the 1960s series by W. Watts Biggers

=== UPA ===
Title	Original run	Network	Notes
The Roy Rogers Show	1951–1957	NBC	distribution; produced by Roy Rogers Productions
The Boing Boing Show	1958	CBS	
Mister Magoo	1960–1961	Syndication	
The Dick Tracy Show	1961–1962	Syndication	
The Famous Adventures of Mr. Magoo	1964–1965	NBC	
What's New Mr. Magoo?	1977	CBS	co-production with DePatie-Freleng Enterprises

=== Harvey Entertainment ===
- Noveltoons (1950–1962)
- Screen Songs (1950–1951)
- Casper the Friendly Ghost (1950–1959)
- Herman and Katnip (1950–1959)
- Kartunes (1951–1953)
- Modern Madcaps (1958–1962)
  - Jeepers and Creepers (1960)
  - The Cat (1960–1961)
- Abner the Baseball (1961; two-reeler special)
- The Baby Huey Show (1994–1995)
- The Spooktacular New Adventures of Casper (1996–1998)
- Richie Rich (1996)

=== Big Idea Entertainment ===
Title	Original run	Network	Co-producer(s)
VeggieTales	1993–2015	Direct-to-video	DKP Effects (2002-2004)/DKP Studios (2004-2007)/Starz Animation (2006-2008); Huhu Studios (2009-2015); Bardel Entertainment (2015)
3-2-1 Penguins!	2000–2003; 2006–2008	Direct-to-video (2000-2003); Qubo (2006-2008)	Cornerstone Animation (2002-2003)
Larryboy: The Cartoon Adventures	2002–2003	Direct-to-video	DKP Effects
VeggieTales in the House	2014–2016	Netflix	Bardel Entertainment; DreamWorks Animation Television
VeggieTales in the City	2017	Netflix	Bardel Entertainment; DreamWorks Animation Television
The VeggieTales Show	2019–2022	Trinity Broadcasting Network	Trilogy Animation Group; Prana Studios; 88 Studios

=== Golden Books Family Entertainment ===
Title	Years	Network	Notes
Girl Talk	1989	Syndication	
Lamb Chop's Play-Along	1992–1995	PBS	produced by Paragon Entertainment Corporation and WTTW
The Little Lulu Show	1995–1999	CTV; Family Channel; HBO	co-production for Cinar and TMO-Loonland
Lassie	1997–1999	YTV/Animal Planet	co-production with Cinar and PolyGram Filmed Entertainment
The Charlie Horse Music Pizza	1998–1999	PBS	co-production with KCET
Poky and Friends	1998	Direct-to-video; Playhouse Disney	co-production with Varga Studio and TVC London

==== Rankin/Bass Animated Entertainment (pre-1974) ====
Title	Years	Network	Notes
The New Adventures of Pinocchio	1961	Syndication	
Tales of the Wizard of Oz	1961	Syndication	co-production with Crawley Films
The King Kong Show	1966–1969	ABC; TV Asahi	co-production with Toei Animation
The Smokey Bear Show	1969–1971	ABC	
The Tomfoolery Show	1970–1971	NBC	
The Reluctant Dragon and Mr. Toad Show	1970–1971	ABC	
Jackson 5ive	1971–1972	ABC	co-production with Motown Productions
The Osmonds	1972	ABC	
Kid Power	1972–1973	ABC	
Festival of Family Classics	1972	Syndication	

==== Color Systems Technology, Inc. ====
Title	Years	Network	Notes
Felix the Cat	1958–60	Syndication	produced by Trans-Lux Television, Adventure Cartoon Productions and Paramount Cartoon Studios
Mack & Myer for Hire	1963–64	Syndication	produced by Trans-Lux Television
The Mighty Hercules	1963–66	Syndication	produced by Trans-Lux Television and Adventure Cartoon Productions
American Caesar	1983	Syndication	

==== Palladium Entertainment ====
- The Lone Ranger (1949–57)
- Lassie (1954 TV series) (1954–73)
- Sergeant Preston of the Yukon (1955–58)
- The Lone Ranger (animated TV series) (1966–68)
- Skippy the Bush Kangaroo (1968–70)
- Lassie's Rescue Rangers (1972–73)
- The Lone Ranger (1980 TV series) (1980–82)
- The New Lassie (1989–92) (co-production with Al Burton Productions and MCA TV)

==== Total Television ====
Title	Years	Network	Notes
King Leonardo and His Short Subjects	1960–1963	NBC	Production ceased in 1961.
Tennessee Tuxedo and His Tales	1963–1966	CBS	
Underdog	1964–1967	NBC/CBS	Moved to CBS starting in 1966.
The Beagles	1966–1967	CBS	

=== Entertainment Rights ===
Formerly known as Sleepy Kids (1989–1999) and SKD Media (1999–2000).

Title	Original run	Network	Notes
Potsworth & Co.	1990	Children's BBC	co-production with Hanna-Barbera
Budgie the Little Helicopter	1994–1996	CITV	co-production with HTV and Fred Wolf Films
Dr. Zitbag's Transylvania Pet Shop	1994–1997	CITV	co-production with Fairwater Films, PMMP Productions and Carlton Television
Molly's Gang	1994	CITV	distribution; produced by Martin Gates Productions
Titch	1997–2000	CITV	produced by Hutchins Film Company and Yorkshire Television
Meeow!	2000	CITV	co-production with Siriol Productions, Scottish Television, and Comataidh Craolaidh Gaidhlig
Cubeez	2000–2001	GMTV	co-production with Starsound B.V. and Cubeedobeedo Ltd
Merlin the Magical Puppy	2001	CITV	co-production with the Little Entertainment Co.
Inuk	2001	CBC Television	co-production with Tube Studios
Dr Otter	2001–2002	CBBC	produced by Red Balloo and Ealing Animation
The Basil Brush Show	2002–2007	CBBC	co-production with The Foundation
Little Red Tractor	2004–2007	CBeebies	co-production with the Little Entertainment Co.
Jim Jam and Sunny	2006–2008	CITV	co-production with Wish Films
Rupert Bear, Follow the Magic...	2006–2008	Channel 5	co-production with Cosgrove-Hall Films

==== Carrington Productions International ====
Title	Years	Network	Notes
The New Adventures of Zorro	1997–1998	Syndication	co-production with Warner Bros. International Television Production, Zorro Productions, Inc., Harvest Entertainment and Fred Wolf Films Dublin
The Fantastic Voyages of Sinbad the Sailor	1998	Cartoon Network	co-production with Warner Bros. International Television Production, WW Productions and Fred Wolf Films Dublin
Lavender Castle	1999–2000	CITV	co-production with Cosgrove Hall Films and Gerry Anderson Productions

==== Link Entertainment ====
- Orm and Cheep (1983–1985)
- The Family-Ness (1984–1985) (distribution; produced by Maddocks Animation)
- The Trap Door (1984) (distribution; produced by CMTB Animation and Queensgate Productions)
- Jimbo and the Jet-Set (1986) (distribution; produced by Maddocks Animation)
- Bill the Minder (1987) (produced by Bevanfield Films)
- Stoppit and Tidyup (1988) (distribution; CMTB Animation and Queensgate Productions)
- Penny Crayon (1989–1990) (distribution; produced by Maddocks Animation)
- Tales of a Wise King (1989)
- Jane Speakman's Tiny Tales (1989)
- What-a-Mess (1990) (co-produced with Bevanfield Films)
- Just So Stories (1991) (produced by Bevanfield Films)
- Christopher Crocodile (1993) (co-produced with Mixpix and BBC)
- Pirates (1994–1997) (produced by Childsplay Productions)
- Caribou Kitchen (1995–1997) (distribution; produced by Maddocks Animation)
- Grabbit the Rabbit (1996)
- Chatterhappy Ponies
- The Forgotten Toys (1997–1999) (co-produced with United Productions, Hibbert Ralph Entertainment, and Meridian Broadcasting)
- Teddybears (1997–2000) (co-produced with United Productions)
- Preston Pig (2000) (co-produced with Varga London)
- Ethelbert the Tiger (2001) (co-produced with Millimages)
- Fairy Tales (produced by Bevanfield Films)
- Eye of the Storm (produced by Childsplay Productions)
- Jack and Marcel

==== Woodland Animations ====
Title	Original run	Network	Notes
Gran	1983	BBC One	
Bertha	1985–1986	BBC One/BBC Two	
Charlie Chalk	1988–1989	BBC One	

==== Tell-Tale Productions ====
Title	Original run	Network	Notes
Fun Song Factory	1994–1998; 2004	Direct-to-video; CITV	co-production with Entertainment Rights
Boo!	2003–06	CBeebies	distributed by Universal Television
BB3B	2005	CBBC	co-production with Entertainment Rights

==== Filmation ====
NOTE: This list does not include shows not owned by DreamWorks Animation.

- The Archie Show (1968)
- The Archie Comedy Hour (1969)
- The Hardy Boys (1969)
- Sabrina and the Groovie Goolies (1970) (Co-produced with The Sabrina Company)
- Archie's Funhouse (live-action/animation hybrid) (1970)
- Archie's TV Funnies (1971)
- Fat Albert and the Cosby Kids (1972-1976)
- Lassie's Rescue Rangers (1972–1973)
- The U.S. of Archie (1974)
- The Secret Lives of Waldo Kitty (1975)
- The Ghost Busters (live-action) (1975)
- Uncle Croc's Block (1975) (featuring Fraidy Cat, Wacky and Packy, and M*U*S*H)
- Ark II (live-action) (1976)
- Space Academy (live-action) (1977)
- The New Archie and Sabrina Hour (1977) (divided in midseason into Sabrina Superwitch and Archie's Bang Shang Lollapalooza Show)
- Fabulous Funnies (1978)
- The New Fat Albert Show (1979–1982)
- The New Adventures of Flash Gordon (1979)
- Sport Billy (1980)
- Blackstar (1981)
- The New Adventures of Zorro (1981)
- He-Man and the Masters of the Universe (1983–1985) (co-production with Mattel)
- The Adventures of Fat Albert and the Cosby Kids (1984–1985)
- She-Ra: Princess of Power (1985–1987) (co-production with Mattel)
- Ghostbusters (1986–1988) (co-production with Tribune Entertainment)
- BraveStarr (1987–1988)
- The Gamesman (live-action) (1988–1989)
- The International Outdoorsman (live-action) (1988–1989)

=== Felix the Cat Productions ===
Title	Original run	Network	Notes
Felix the Cat	1958–1961	Syndication	co-production with Paramount Cartoon Studios and Trans-Lux
The Twisted Tales of Felix the Cat	1995–1997	CBS	co-production with Film Roman
Baby Felix	2000–2001	JBC	co-production with Radix, AEON Inc and NEC Interchannel

=== Chapman Entertainment ===
Title	Original run	Network	Notes
Fifi and the Flowertots	2005–2009	Five	
Roary the Racing Car	2007–2011	Five	
Little Charley Bear	2011–2015	CBeebies	co-production with Annix Studios

== Sky Studios ==
Title	Original run	Network	Notes
The Wine Show	2016–present	ITV	Distribution only produced by Infinity Creative Media
Riviera	2017–2020	Sky Atlantic	co-production with Archery Pictures, Primo Productions and Altice Studio
The Russell Howard Hour	2017–2022	Sky One/Sky Max	co-production with Avalon Television
Britannia	2018–2021	Sky Atlantic; Amazon Prime Video (season 1)/Epix (season 3–)	co-production with Vertigo Films and Neal Street Productions
Save Me	2018–2020	Sky Atlantic	co-production with World Productions
A Discovery of Witches	2018–2022	Sky One/Sky Max	co-production with Bad Wolf and Sky UK
Das Boot	2018–2023	Sky One (Germany)	co-production with Bavaria Film, Bavaria Fiction, Stillking and Latina Pictures
Brassic	2019–2025	Sky One/Sky Max	co-production with Calamity Films
Frayed	2019–2021	Sky One/Sky Max	co-production with Guesswork Television and Merman Television
The New Pope	2020	Sky Atlantic (Italy); HBO; Canal+	co-production with The Apartment Pictures, Wildside, Haut et Court and The Mediapro Studio
COBRA	2020–2023	Sky One/Sky Max	co-production with New Pictures
ZeroZeroZero	2020	Sky Atlantic (Italy); Canal+ Amazon Prime Video	co-production with Cattelya, Bartleby Film and Sky Italia
Breeders	2020–2023	FX; Sky One/Sky Comedy	co-production with Avalon Television and FXP
Gangs of London	2020–present	Sky Atlantic	co-production with Pulse Films, Sister, OneMoreOne and AMC Networks
Bloodline Detectives with Nancy Grace	2020–present	Quest Red; Broadcast syndication	uncredited; co-production with FilmRise and Peninsula Television; Distributed in the US by FilmRise and Genesis International
Little Birds	2020	Sky Atlantic	co-production with Warp Films
Two Weeks to Live	2020	Sky One	co-production with Kudos
The Third Day	2020	Sky Atlantic; HBO	co-production with Punchdrunk International, Plan B Entertainment, Scott Free Productions and HBO Entertainment
We Are Who We Are	2020	Sky Atlantic (Italy); HBO	co-production with The Apartment Pictures, Wildside and Small Forward Productions
Intergalactic	2021	Sky One	co-production with Sky UK, Moonage Pictures, Motion Content Group and Tiger Aspect Productions
Domina	2021–2023	Sky Atlantic	co-production with Fifty Fathoms
The Rising	2022	Sky Max	Based on the Belgian television series 'Hotel Beau Séjour'
The Baby	2022	HBO; Sky Atlantic	co-production with Sister and Proverbial Pictures
The Lazarus Project	2022–2023	Sky Max	co-production with Urban Myth Films
Funny Woman	2023–2024	Sky Max	co-production with Rebel Park Productions and Potboiler
Dreamland	2023	Sky Atlantic	
The Lovers	2023	Sky Atlantic	co-production with Drama Republic

=== Jupiter Entertainment ===
Title	Original run	Network	Notes
Modern Marvels	1993–2014; 2021–2022	A&E/History/H2	
City Confidential	1998–2023	A&E	
Dominick Dunne's Power, Privilege, and Justice	2002–2009	TruTV	
Snapped	2004–present	Oxygen	co-production with Oxygen Media Productions
Live Through This	2008	Fuse TV	
Welcome to Myrtle Manor	2012–2013	TLC	co-production with The Weinstein Company
Fatal Attraction	2013–present	TV One	
Snapped: Killer Couples	2013–present	Oxygen	co-production with Oxygen Media Productions
ATL Homicide	2018–2023	TV One	co-production with Wide Net Productions
Storm of Suspicion	2018–2020	The Weather Channel	
The Missing	2019–2020	Investigation Discovery	
Southern Gothic	2020	Investigation Discovery	
10 Things You Don't Know	2020	E!	co-production with E! Entertainment Television
American Detective	2021	Discovery+	
Snapped: Behind Bars	2021	Oxygen	co-production with Oxygen Media Productions
Finding Andrea	2021–present	Discovery+	

=== Sky Group ===
Title	Original run	Network	Notes
Noel's Christmas Presents	2007–2012	Sky 1	co-production with Twofour
Noel's HQ	2008–2009	Sky1	co-production with Twofour
A League of Their Own	2010–2025	Sky One; Sky Max	co-production with CPL
Bedlam	2011–2012	Sky Living	co-production with Red Production Company
This is Jinsy	2011–2014	Sky Atlantic	co-production with Welded Tandem Picture Company and Tiger Aspect Productions
Trollied	2011–2018	Sky One	co-production with Roughcut TV
The Café	2011–2013	Sky 1	co-production with Jellylegs
Stella	2012–2017	Sky One	co-production with Tidy Productions
Hit & Miss	2012	Sky Atlantic	co-production with Red Production Company and AbbottVision
Styled to Rock	2012	Sky Living	co-production with Twenty Twenty, Fenty Films, Overbrook Entertainment and Marcy Media Films
A Touch of Cloth	2012–2014	Sky 1	co-production with Zeppotron
Moone Boy	2012–2015	Sky 1	co-production with Baby Cow Productions, Sprout Pictures, Hot Cod Productions, and Grand Pictures
John Bishop's Only Joking	2013	Sky 1	co-production with Channel X and Lola Entertainment
The Moaning of Life	2013–2015	Sky 1	co-production with me & you and rounded Productions
Yonderland	2013–2016	Sky 1	co-production with Working Title Television
Mr. Sloane	2014	Sky Atlantic	co-production with Whyaduck Productions and Big Talk Productions

=== Living TV Group ===
Title	Original run	Network	Notes
Travel Sick	2001–2003	Bravo; Comedy Central	co-production with Class Films
Most Haunted	2002–2010	Living	co-production with Antix Productions
6ixth Sense	2002–2003	LivingTV	co-production with IPM
Jane Goldman Investigates	2003–2004	LivingTV	co-production with Flame Television
I'm Famous and Frightened!	2004–2005	LivingTV	co-production with Scream Films
Dead Famous	2004–2006	LivingTV	co-production with Twofour
Booze Britain	2004–2005	Bravo	co-production with Lab (season 1) and Granada (season 2)
When Games Attack	2004–2005	Bravo	co-production with Gamer.TV
Football Italia	2005–2006	Bravo	co-production with North One Television
Derek Acorah's Ghost Towns	2005–2006	LivingTV	co-production with RuggieMedia
Man's Work	2006	Bravo	co-production with Shine

== Television specials ==
=== Universal Television ===
- Carnival Nights (1968) (co-production with J.B. Productions)
- The Sound of Music Live! (2013) (co-production with Sony Pictures Television and Storyline Entertainment.
  Based on the musical of same name by Rodgers & Hammerstein)
- Peter Pan Live! (2014) (co-production with Sony Pictures Television and Storyline Entertainment.
  Based on the 1954 musical of the same name by Jerome Robbins and a remake of the 1955, 1956 and 1960 live musical broadcasts by NBC)
- How Murray Saved Christmas (2014) (co-production with Rough Draft Studios and Universal Animation Studios)
- The Wiz Live! (2015) (co-production with Sony Pictures Television and Cirque du Soleil.
  Based on the 1978 film by Universal Pictures)
- Adele Live in New York City (2015)
- Must See TV: A Tribute to James Burrows (2016)
- Hairspray Live! (2016) (co-production with Warner Bros. Television, New Line Cinema, Storyline Entertainment and Sony Pictures Television. Based on the 1988 film and the 2007 remake by New Line Cinema)
- The Paley Center Salutes NBC's 90th Anniversary (2017)
- The David S. Pumpkins Halloween Special (2017) (co-production with Bento Box Entertainment, Broadway Video and SNL Studios)
- Jesus Christ Superstar Live in Concert (2018) (co-production with Sony Pictures Television, Storyline Entertainment and Marc Platt Productions.
  Based on the stage musical of the same name produced by Really Useful Group and the 1973 film of the same name by Universal Pictures)
- 70th Primetime Emmy Awards (2018) (co-production with Done and Dusted, Broadway Video and Academy of Television Arts & Sciences)
- A Very Wicked Halloween: Celebrating 15 Years on Broadway (2018) (co-production with Marc Platt Productions and White Cherry Entertainment)
- Illumination Presents Minions Holiday Special (2020) (co-production with Illumination)
- 5 More Sleeps 'Til Christmas (2021) (co-production with ShadowMachine and Electric Hot Dog)

=== Universal Television Alternative Studio ===
- Elvis' 1968 Special's 50th Anniversary (All Star Tribute) (1968) (co-production with AEG/Ehrlich Productions and Authentic Brands Group
  Distributed outside the US by Alfred Haber Distribution)
- Celebrity Escape Room (2020) (co-production with Red Hour Productions and Electric Dynamite)
- Alex Murdaugh: Death. Deception. Power (2021) (co-production with Wolf Entertainment and Left/Right Productions)
- Good One: A Show About Jokes (2024) (Vox Media Studios, Sethmaker Shoemeyer Productions and Eddie Schmidt)

=== NBC Studios ===
- Macy's Thanksgiving Day Parade (1939-present)
- Babes in Toyland (1955)
- The Bob Hope Vietnam Christmas Show (1972)
- Women Who Rate a 10 (1981)
- Macy's 4th of July Fireworks (1983-present)
- NBC's 60th Anniversary Celebration (1986)
- TV's Funniest Friends & Neighbors (1995) (co-production with Big Daddy Productions)
- The World's Most Dangerous Magic (1998)
- Confirmation: The Hard Evidence of Aliens Among Us? (1999)
- The World's Most Dangerous Magic (1999)
- 50 Years of NBC Late Night (2001)
- NBC 75th Anniversary Special (2002)
- Secrets of the Psychics Revealed (2003) (co-production with Nash Entertainment and Don Weiner Productions. Distributed internationally by Alfred Haber Distribution)
- Harry for the Holidays (2003)

=== PolyGram Television ===
- Barney's First Adventures (1998) (co-produced with Gold Coast Television Entertainment and Lyrick Studios Based on the 1998 film Barney's Great Adventure by PolyGram Filmed Entertainment Mattel owns the rights to the Barney IP)

=== Universal International Studios ===
==== Carnival Films ====
- The Manners of Downton Abbey (2015) (co-production with Chocolate Media and Masterpiece)

==== Universal Television Alternative Studio UK ====
- Pushy Parents (2005)
- X-Rated: The TV They Tried to Ban (2005)
- X-Rated: Top 20 Most Controversial TV Moments (2005)
- The Curse of Superman (2006)
- Raised by the Hand of God (2006)
- The 9/11 Liars (2006)
- Cutting Edge: Trapped by My Twin (2007)
- Elton John: Me, Myself & I (2007) (co-production with Globe Productions)
- Hitler's Favourite Royal (2007)
- Face the Music: The Feeling (2008)
- Prince Charles' Other Mistress (2008)
- Alan Carr's Grease Night (2016)
- Meet the Markles (2018)
- Courtney Act's Christmas Extravaganza (2018)
- The Inbetweeners: Fwiends Reunited (2019) (co-production with Fudge Park)
- Miranda's Games with Showbiz Names (2020)

==== Chocolate Media ====
- Britain's Greatest Gold Medalists (2012)
- Raymond Blanc: The Very Hungry Frenchman (2012)
- Blenheim Palace: Great War House (2014)
- The Manners of Downton Abbey (2015) (co-production with Carnival Films and Masterpiece)

=== NBCUniversal News Group ===
- Gangs, Corps & Drugs (1989)
- Drug Bust: The Longest War (1999)
- Justice for All: A Gerald Rivera Special (2000)
- Watergate: Legacy of Secrets (2002)
- Secrets of Supervolcanoes (2005)
- Shark Attack: Predator in the Panhandle (2005)
- The Law That Changed America (2005)
- From the Files of People Magazine: 50 Crimes That Captivated America (2005)
- When the Leavees Failed (2005)
- Hurricanes: Deadly Secrets (2005)
- Biography of the Year (2005)
- New York's Secret War (2006)
- Under Investigation; Mansions, Murder & Mystery (2006)
- America's Top Sleuths (2006) (co-production with Universal Television)
- Virginia Tech: Eyewitness to Tragedy (2007)
- Candle to Grave? (2008)
- Doomed to Die? 13 Most Shocking Hollywood Curses (2008)

==== Peacock Productions ====
- The Kennedy Brothers: A Hardball Documentary (2009)
- Kate: Her Story (2009)
- Intervention with Death: Addiction with Uniform (2009) (co-production with GRB Entertainment)
- Storm Stories: Missing Family (2009) (co-production with Towers Productions)
- Travel Like A President (2012)
- My Big Fat American Gypsy Wedding: The Aftermath (2012) (co-production with Firecracker Films)
- America's Got Talent: Wild Card (2012) (co-production with FremantleMedia North America and Syco Entertainment)
- Breaking Amish: The Stunning Truth (2012) (co-production with Hot Snaked Media)
- Sister Wives Tell All (2013–2019) (co-production with Figure 8 Films and Puddle Monkey Productions)
- Skywire Live (2013)
- Why We Did It (2014)
- A Toast to 2014 (2014)
- Whitney Houston Live: Her Greatest Performances (2015)
- Bobby Brown: Remembering Whitney (2015)
- Sister Wives: Best of Tell All (2015) (co-production with Figure 8 Films and Puddle Monkey Productions)
- The Rise and Fall of El Chapo (2016)
- 90 Day Fiancé: Happily Ever After?: Tell All (2016) (co-production with Sharp Entertainment)
- 10th Date: Girls Night In (2017)
- Surviving Harvey: Animals After the Storm (2017)
- Phelps Vs. Shark: Great Gold Vs. Great White (2017)
- Shark School with Michael Phelps (2017)
- USS Indianapolis Live: From The Deep (2017)
- Surviving R. Kelly: The Impact (2019)
- Memory Box: Echos of 9/11 (2021)

=== Peacock Media Productions ===
- Snoop & Martha's Very Tasty Halloween (2021) (co-production with Magical Elves Productions, Buzzfeed Studios and Snoopadelic Films)

=== DreamWorks Animation ===
==== UPA ====
- Mr. Magoo's Christmas Carol (1962)
- Uncle Sam Magoo (1970)

==== Golden Books Family Entertainment ====
- To Lassie with Love (1974)
- 101 Things for Kids To Do (1987) (co-owned with the Peter Rodgers Organization)
- Little Golden Book Land (1989)
- The Poky Little Puppy's First Christmas || (1992)
- Goldilocks and the Three Bears Sing Their Little Bitty Hearts Out (1994)
- Three Little Pigs Sing A Gig (1994)

===== Rankin/Bass Animated Entertainment (pre-1974) =====
- Return to Oz (1964) (produced as Videocraft)
- Rudolph the Red-Nosed Reindeer (1964) (produced as Videocraft)
- The Edgar Bergen & Charlie McCarthy Show (1965)
- The Ballad of Smokey the Bear (1966)
- The Cricket on the Hearth (1967)
- Mouse on the Mayflower (1968)
- The Little Drummer Boy (1968)
- Frosty the Snowman (1969)
- The Mad, Mad, Mad Comedians (1970)
- Santa Claus Is Comin' To Town (1970)
- Here Comes Peter Cottontail (1971)
- The Enchanted World of Danny Kaye: The Emperor's New Clothes (1972)
- Puss in Boots (1972)
- Mad Mad Mad Monsters (1972)
- Willie Mays and the Say-Hey Kid (1972)
- The Red Baron (1972)
- That Girl in Wonderland (1973)

===== Tomorrow Entertainment (pre-January 1, 1975) =====
- The Glass House (1972)
- Gargoyles (1972)
- A War of Children (1972)
- Birds of Prey (1973)
- A Brand New Life (1973)
- The Fabulous Doctor Fable (1973)
- The Man Who Could Talk to Kids (1973)
- I Heard the Owl Call My Name (1973)
- The Autobiography of Miss Jane Pittman (1974)
- Tell Me Where It Hurts (1974)
- Nicky's World (1974)
- Larry (1974)
- Born Innocent (1974)
- Things in Their Season (1974)
- Miles to Go Before I Sleep (1975)
- Queen of the Stardust Ballroom (1975)
- In This House of Brede (1975)

==== Entertainment Rights ====
- Second Star to the Left (2001) (co-production with Silver Fox Films and BBC)
- Postman Pat:
  - Postman Pat and the Greendale Rocket (2003)
  - Postman Pat's Magic Christmas (2003)
  - Postman Pat Clowns Around (2004)
  - Postman Pat and the Pirate Treasure (2004)
  - Postman Pat's Great Big Birthday (2005)

===== Carrington Productions International =====
- A Monster Christmas (1994) (co-production with Fat City Films and JWP Entertainment International)

===== Link Entertainment =====
- Postman Pat:
  - Postman Pat's ABC (1990)
  - Postman Pat's 123 (1990)
  - Postman Pat Takes The Bus (1991)
  - Postman Pat And The Toy Soldiers (1991)
  - Postman Pat And The Tuba (1994)
  - Postman Pat And The Barometer (1994)
  - Read Along With Postman Pat (1994)
- The Forgotten Toys (1995) (co-production with United Productions, Hibbert Ralph Entertainment, and Meridian Broadcasting)
- The First Snow of Winter (1997) (co-production with Hibbert Ralph Entertainment and BBC)

===== Filmation =====
- Archie and His New Pals (1969)
- Hey, Hey, Hey, It's Fat Albert (1969)
- The Archie, Sugar Sugar, Jingle Jangle Show (1970)
- Lassie and the Spirit of Thunder Mountain (1972)
- The Fat Albert Halloween Special (1977)
- The Fat Albert Christmas Special (1977)
- A Snow White Christmas (1980)
- The Fat Albert Easter Special (1982)
- Flash Gordon: The Greatest Adventure of All (1982)

== Television movies ==
=== Universal Television ===
- Fame Is the Name of the Game (1966)
- The Doomsday Flight (1966)
- How I Spent My Summer Vacation (1967)
- The Longest Hundred Miles (1967)
- Wings of Fire (1967)
- The Borgia Stick (1967)
- Winchester '73 (1967)
- Ironside (1967)
- Valley of Mystery (1967)
- Sullivan's Empire (1967)
- Ready and Willing (1967)
- Stranger on the Run (1967)
- The Outsider (1967)
- Prescription: Murder (1968)
- Shadow Over Elveron (1968)
- Split Second to an Epitaph (1968)
- Istanbul Express (1968)
- Now You See It, Now You Don't (1968)
- Companions in Nightmare (1968)
- Something for a Lonely Man (1968)
- Escape to Mindanao (1968)
- The Sound of Anger (1968)
- The Sunshine Patriot (1968)
- The Smugglers (1968)
- The Last of the Powerseekers (1969)
- Trial Run (1969)
- Dragnet 1966 (1969)
- Any Second Now (1969)
- Fear No Evil (1969)
- The Whole World Is Watching (1969)
- This Savage Land (1969)
- The Lonely Profession (1969)
- Destiny of a Spy (1969)
- Run a Crooked Mile (1969)
- D.A.: Murder One (1969)
- Silent Night, Lonely Night (1969)
- My Sweet Charlie (1970)
- The Movie Murderer (1970)
- The Challengers (1970)
- Ritual of Evil (1970)
- The Young Country (1970)
- Lost Flight (1970)
- Company of Killers (1970)
- Dial Hot Line (1970)
- Me and Benjie (1970)
- A Clear and Present Danger (1970)
- The Other Man (1970)
- The Aquarians (1970)
- Berlin Affair (1970)
- The Intruders (1970)
- Hauser's Memory (1970)
- Breakout (1970)
- D.A.: Conspiracy to Kill (1971)
- Do You Take This Stranger? (1971)
- Who Killed the Mysterious Mr. Foster? (1971)
- The Neon Ceiling (1971)
- Hitched (1971)
- The City (1971)
- The Birdmen (1971)
- Lock, Stock and Barrel (1971)
- The Deadly Dream (1971)
- River of Mystery (1971)
- The Impatient Heart (1971)
- Don't Push, I'll Charge When I'm Ready (1971)
- Marriage: Year One (1971)
- Death Takes a Holiday (1971)
- A Little Game (1971)
- Two on a Bench (1971)
- A Howling in the Woods (1971)
- The Harness (1971)
- Duel (1971)
- The Snow Goose (1971)
- Ellery Queen: Don't Look Behind You (1971)
- The Failing of Raymond (1971)
- The Devil and Miss Sarah (1971)
- How to Steal an Airplane (1971)
- See the Man Run (1971)
- What's a Nice Girl Like You...? (1971)
- The Astronaut (1972)
- The Bravos (1972)
- Cutter (1972)
- The Screaming Woman (1972)
- The Hound of the Baskervilles (1972)
- Evil Roy Slade (1972)
- Adventures of Nick Carter (1972)
- A Very Missing Person (1972)
- Jigsaw (1972)
- The Longest Night (1972)
- Lieutenant Schuster's Wife (1972)
- Short Walk to Daylight (1972)
- Family Flight (1972)
- That Certain Summer (1972)
- Magic Carpet (1972)
- The Victim (1972)
- All My Darling Daughters (1972)
- The Bull of the West (1972)
- The Man Who Came to Dinner (1972)
- The Judge and Jake Wyler (1972)
- The Couple Takes a Wife (1972)
- The Woman I Love (1972)
- Set This Town on Fire (1973)
- Hernandez (1973)
- Female Artillery (1973)
- Lady Luck (1973)
- The Great Man's Whiskers (1973)
- I Love a Mystery (1973)
- You'll Never See Me Again (1973)
- Brock's Last Case (1973)
- The Six Million Dollar Man (1973)
- The Marcus-Nelson Murders (1973)
- Applause (1973)
- The Red Pony (1973)
- Beg, Borrow ... or Steal (1973)
- Tom Sawyer (1973)
- Partners in Crime (1973)
- Chase (1973)
- Savage (1973)
- Drive Hard, Drive Fast (1973)
- She Cried Murder (1973)
- Runaway! (1973)
- The Alpha Caper (1973)
- Double Indemnity (1973)
- The Six Million Dollar Man: Wine, Woman and War (1973)
- Money to Burn (1973)
- Linda (1973)
- My Darling Daughters' Anniversary (1973)
- Sunshine (1973)
- Death Race (1973)
- Trapped (1973)
- The Six Million Dollar Man: The Solid Gold Kidnapping (1973)
- Scream, Pretty Peggy (1973)
- Maneater (1973)
- Legend in Granite (1973)
- If I Had a Million (1973)
- Bad Men of the West (1974)
- Indict and Convict (1974)
- Skyway to Death (1974)
- The Questor Tapes (1974)
- Heatwave! (1974)
- Killdozer (1974)
- The Elevator (1974)
- Live Again, Die Again (1974)
- A Case of Rape (1974)
- Hitchhike! (1974)
- Houston, We've Got a Problem (1974)
- Mousey (1974)
- The Man from Independence (1974)
- The Execution of Private Slovik (1974)
- House of Evil (1974)
- A Cry in the Wilderness (1974)
- Pete 'n' Tillie (1974)
- The Chadwick Family (1974)
- Rex Harrison Presents Stories of Love (1974)
- The Story of Pretty Boy Floyd (1974)
- The California Kid (1974)
- Aloha Means Goodbye (1974)
- The Cay (1974)
- The Law (1974)
- The Greatest Gift (1974)
- The Gun (1974)
- The Tribe (1974)
- This Is the West That Was (1974)
- The Rangers (1974)
- The Log of the Black Pearl (1975)
- Target Risk (1975)
- The Specialists (1975)
- Let's Switch! (1975)
- Sarah T. - Portrait of a Teenage Alcoholic (1975)
- A Cry for Help (1975)
- The Family Nobody Wanted (1975)
- You Lie So Deep, My Love (1975)
- The Desperate Miles (1975)
- Force Five (1975)
- Crime Club (1975)
- One of Our Own (1975)
- Man on the Outside (1975)
- Mobile Two (1975)
- Long Way Home (1975)
- The UFO Incident (1975)
- Guilty or Innocent: The Sam Sheppard Murder Case (1975)
- The Art of Crime (1975)
- Dark Victory (1976)
- Mallory: Circumstantial Evidence (1976)
- Farewell to Manzanar (1976)
- Hazard's People (1976)
- The Keegans (1976)
- Stranded (1976)
- The Return of the World's Greatest Detective (1976)
- Perilous Voyage (1976)
- Territorial Men (1976)
- The Invasion of Johnson Country (1976)
- Bridger (1976)
- Scott Free (1976)
- Amelia Earhart (1976)
- Richie Brockelman: The Missing 24 Hours (1976)
- Benny and Barney: Las Vegas Undercover (1977)
- Stonestreet: Who Killed the Centerfold Model? (1977)
- Tail Gunner Joe (1977)
- Pine Canyon Is Burning (1977)
- The Man with the Power (1977)
- Ransom for Alice! (1977)
- Charlie Cobb: Nice Night for a Hanging (1977)
- The 3,000 Mile Chase (1977)
- Exo-Man (1977)
- Sex and the Married Woman (1977)
- Just a Little Inconvenience (1977)
- The Storyteller (1977)
- It Happened One Christmas (1977)
- Sunshine Christmas (1977)
- Confessions of the D.A. Man (1978)
- Dr. Scorpion (1978)
- The Two-Five (1978)
- The Gypsy Warriors (1978)
- The Bastard (1978)
- Windows, Doors & Keyholes (1978)
- Love Is Not Enough (1978)
- Funny Business (1978)
- Dr. Strange (1978)
- The Islander (1978)
- The Immigrants (1978)
- The Jordan Chance (1978)
- Amateur Night at the Dixie Bar and Grill (1979)
- Captain America (1979)
- Mandrake (1979)
- The Horror Show (1979)
- Women in White (1979)
- The Chinese Typewriter (1979)
- Samurai (1979)
- The Castaways on Gilligan's Island (1979)
- The Night Rider (1979)
- The Ultimate Impostor (1979)
- The Rebels (1979)
- Battlestar Galactica (1979)
- The Return of Charlie Chan (1979)
- Stone (1979)
- The Golden Gate Murders (1979)
- The Thirteenth Day: The Story of Esther (1979)
- Captain America II: Death Too Soon (1979)
- Beggarman, Thief (1979)
- High Midnight(1979)
- Conquest of the Earth (1980)
- Once Upon a Family (1980)
- Brave New World (1980)
- Battles: The Murder That Wouldn't Die (1980)
- Where the Ladies Go (1980)
- The Gossip Columnist (1980)
- Off the Minnesota Strip (1980)
- Nightside (1980)
- The Secret War of Jackie's Girls (1980)
- Midnight Lace (1981)
- The Munsters' Revenge (1981)
- Hellinger's Law (1981)
- Madame X (1981)
- The Archer: Fugitive from the Empire (1981)
- Peter and Paul (1981)
- The Harlem Globetrotters on Gilligan's Island (1981)
- The Miracle of Kathy Miller (1981)
- Advice to the Lovelorn (1981)
- Terror at Alcatraz (1982)
- Moonlight (1982)
- E.T. and Friends: Magical Movie Visitors (1982)
- Memories Never Die (1982)
- The Invisible Woman (1983)
- M.A.D.D.: Mothers Against Drunk Drivers (1983)
- Still the Beaver (1983)
- The Jerk, Too (1984)
- Airwolf (1984)
- The Red-Light Sting (1984)
- Time Bomb (1984)
- The Return of Marcus Welby, M.D. (1984)
- The Outlaws (1984)
- Kojak: The Belarus File (1985)
- Code of Vengeance (1985)
- J.O.E. and the Colonel (1985)
- Streets of Justice (1985)
- Annihilator (1986)
- Dalton: Code of Vengeance II (1986)
- The Alan King Show (1986)
- Kojak: The Price of Justice (1987)
- Deadly Care (1987)
- Desperado (1987)
- Island Sons (1987)
- The Return of the Six Million Dollar Man and the Bionic Woman (1987)
- Bates Motel (1987)
- The Return of Desperado (1988)
- Longarm (1988)
- I Saw What You Did (1988)
- Desperado: Avalanche at Devil's Ridge (1988)
- Desert Rats (1988)
- Deadline: Madrid (1988)
- Marcus Welby, M.D.: A Holiday Affair (1988)
- The Road Raiders (1989)
- Bionic Showdown: The Six Million Dollar Man and the Bionic Woman (1989)
- Nasty Boys (1989)
- Desperado: The Outlaw Wars (1989)
- The Hollywood Detective (1989)
- High Desert Kill (1989)
- Kojak: Ariana (1989)
- The Return of Sam McCloud (1989)
- Kojak: Fatal Flaw (1989)
- Desperado: Badlands Justice (1989)
- Kojak: Flowers for Matty (1990)
- Kojak: It's Always Something (1990)
- Kojak: None So Blind (1990)
- Buried Alive (1990)
- Revealing Evidence: Stalking the Honolulu Strangler (1990)
- Curiosity Kills (1990
- Psycho IV: The Beginning (1990)
- Vestige of Honor (1990)
- Tagget (1991)
- Shadow of a Doubt (1991)
- Knight Rider 2000 (1991)
- Silverfox (1991)
- A Wish for Wings That Work (1991)
- The Broken Cord (1992)
- Steel Justice (1992)
- The Keys (1992)
- Stompin' at the Savoy (1992)
- Coopersmith (1992)
- Relentless: Mind of a Killer (1993)
- The Last Hit(1993)
- Class of '61 (1993)
- The Disappearance of Christina (1993)
- TekWar (1994)
- M.A.N.T.I.S. (1994)
- Bandit: Bandit Goes Country (1994)
- Another Midnight Run (1994)
- Knight Rider 2010 (1994)
- TekWar: TekLords (1994)
- TekWar: TekLab (1994)
- Vanishing Son (1994)
- Bandit: Bandit Bandit (1994)
- Midnight Runaround (1994)
- Bandit: Beauty and the Bandit (1994)
- Bandit: Bandit's Silver Angel (1994)
- Hercules: The Legendary Journeys - Hercules and the Lost Kingdom (1994)
- TekWar: TekJustice (1992)
- Midnight Run for Your Life (1994)
- Vanishing Son III (1994)
- Vanishing Son IV (1994)
- Hercules in the Maze of the Minotaur (1994)
- The Rockford Files: I Still Love L.A. (1994)
- The Rockford Files: A Blessing in Disguise (1995)
- The Man Who Wouldn't Die (1995)
- The Rockford Files: If the Frame Fits... (1996)
- The Rockford Files: Godfather Knows Best (1996)
- The Rockford Files: Friends and Foul Play (1996)
- The Universal Story (1996)
- Doctor Who the Movie (1996)
- The Rockford Files: Punishment and Crime (1996)
- An Unexpected Family (1996)
- Things That Go Bump (1997)
- Escape from Atlantis (1997)
- Daughters (1997)
- Murder, She Wrote: South by Southwest (1997)
- The Rockford Files: Shoot-Out at the Golden Pagoda (1997)
- The Ripper (1997)
- Last Rites (1998)
- Brave New World (1998)
- An Unexpected Life (1998)
- Universal Horror (1998)
- The Rockford Files: If It Bleeds... It Leads (1999)
- Kidnapped in Paradise (1999)
- Anya's Bell (1999)
- Murder, She Wrote: A Story to Die For (2000)
- The Last of the Blonde Bombshells (2000)
- Murder, She Wrote: The Last Free Man (2001)
- Murder, She Wrote: The Celtic Riddle (2003)
- The Celebrity Look-Alike Show (2003)
- Stealing Christmas (2003)
- America's Top Sleuths (2006)
- Copperhead (2008)
- Unbreakable Kimmy Schmidt: Kimmy vs the Reverend (2020)
- Zoey's Extraordinary Christmas (2021)

=== Revue Studios ===
- The Slowest Gun in the West (1960)
- Gunfight at Black Horse Canyon (1961)
- See How They Run (1964)
- The Hanged Man (1964)

=== Universal Television Entertainment ===
- Trapped (1989)
- Murder by Night (1989)
- Nightlife (1989)
- The China Lake Murders (1990)
- The Take (1990)
- Dead Reckoning (1990)
- I'm Dangerous Tonight (1990)
- Blind Vengeance (1990)
- Somebody Has to Shoot the Picture (1990)
- Running Against Time (1990)
- Silhouette (1990)
- The Lookalike (1990)
- This Gun for Hire (1991)
- Murder 101 (1991)
- Red Wind (1991)
- Sweet Poison (1991)
- Into the Badlands (1991)
- Lies of the Twins (1991)
- The Last Prostitute (1991)
- Keeping Secrets (1991)
- Brotherhood of the Gun (1991)
- Dead in the Water (1991)
- Strays (1991)
- Black Magic (1992)
- Legacy of Lies (1992)
- Ladykiller (1992)
- Indecency (1992)
- Jack Benny: Comedy in Bloom (1992)
- Wild Card (1992)
- In the Company of Darkness (1993)
- Blindsided (1993)
- When a Stranger Calls Back (1993)
- The Return of Ironside (1993)
- Sex, Love and Cold Hard Cash (1993)
- A Case for Murder (1993)
- Caught in the Act (1993)
- Trouble Shooters: Trapped Beneath the Earth (1993)
- New Eden (1994)
- Dangerous Heart (1994)
- The Birds II: Land's End (1994)
- Dead Man's Revenge (1994)
- Don't Talk to Strangers (1994)
- Incident at Deception Ridge (1994)
- The Haunting of Seacliff Inn (1994)
- Dead Air (1994)
- The Companion (1994)
- Bionic Ever After? (1994)
- Breach of Conduct (1994)
- Lily in Winter (1994)
- Simon & Simon: In Trouble Again (1995)
- The Android Affair (1995)
- Problem Child 3: Junior in Love (1995)
- A Mother's Prayer (1995)
- Letter to My Killer (1995)
- The Colony (1995)
- Sharon's Secret (1995)
- Here Come the Munsters (1995)
- It Came from Outer Space II (1996)
- Rattled (1996)
- Death Benefit (1996)
- Evil Has a Face (1996)
- The Assassination File (1996)
- The Beast (1996)
- The Crying Child (1996)
- The Perfect Daughter (1996)
- The Munsters' Scary Little Christmas (1996)
- Any Place But Home (1997)
- Divided by Hate (1997)
- No Laughing Matter (1998)

=== Studios USA Pictures/USA Cable Entertainment ===
- My Husband's Secret Life (1998)
- Every Mother's Worst Fear (1998)
- Exiled: A Law & Order Movie (1998)
- Killers in the House (1998)
- The Color of Courage (1999)
- Funny Valentines (1999)
- Resurrection (1999)
- Hefner: Unauthorized (1999)
- The Chippendales Murder (2000)
- Return to Cabin by the Lake (2001)
- Prancer Returns (2001)
- Saint Sinner (2002)
- Webs (2003)

=== Multimedia Motion Pictures ===
- Deadly Medicine (1991)
- Deadly Matrimony (1992)
- Desperate Rescue: The Cathy Mahone Story (1993)
- Torch Song (1993)
- Donato and Daughter (1993)
- House of Secrets (1993)
- Jack Reed: Badge of Honor (1993)
- Murder Between Friends (1994)
- Children of the Dark (1994)
- Judith Krantz's Dazzle (1995)

=== NBC Studios ===
- Hay Fever (1939)
- Satins and Spurs (1954)
- Lady in the Dark (1954)
- A Connecticut Yankee (1955)
- The Yeomen of the Guard (1957)
- Annie Get Your Gun (1957)
- Hans Brinker and the Silver Skates (1958)
- The Return of the Smothers Brothers (1970)
- It Couldn't Be Done (1970)
- The Teaching (1970)
- George M! (1970)
- Swing Out, Sweet Land (1970)
- Scotland Yard: The Golden Thread (1971)
- Once Upon a Tour (1971)
- Decisions! Decisions! (1971)
- Festival at Ford's (1971)
- Johnny Carson Presents the Sun City Scandals '72 (1972)
- Dr. Jekyll and Mr. Hyde (1973)
- Saga of Sonora (1973)
- Cotton Club '75 (1974)
- First Ladies Diaries: Rachel Jackson (1975)
- The Beach Boys: It's OK (1976)
- The Loneliest Runner (1976)
- Emily, Emily (1977)
- Peter Lundy and the Medicine Hat Stallion (1977)
- Killing Stone (1978)
- Mrs. R's Daughter (1979)
- Little House Years (1979)
- Cry of the Innocent (1980)
- The Acorn People (1981)
- The Member of the Wedding (1952)
- Wait till Your Mother Gets Home! (1983)
- Rage of Angels (1983)
- When Your Lover Leaves (1983)
- Little House: Look Back to Yesterday (1983)
- Little House: The Last Farewell (1984)
- Mister Roberts (1984)
- Welcome to the Fun Zone (1984)
- Little House: Bless All the Dear Children (1984)
- Poison Ivy (1985)
- Love on the Run (1985)
- An Early Frost (1985)
- C.A.T. Squad (1986)
- Rage of Angels: The Story Continues (1986)
- Blue de Ville (1986)
- The Abduction of Kari Swenson (1987)
- Convicted: A Mother's Story (1988)
- The Little Match Girl (1987)
- The Child Saver (1988)
- C.A.T. Squad: Python Wolf (1988)
- A Father's Homecoming (1988)
- Winnie (1988)
- Take My Daughters, Please (1988)
- I'll Be Home for Christmas (1988)
- Brotherhood of the Rose (1989)
- Those She Left Behind (1989)
- Roe vs. Wade (1989)
- Shannon's Deal (1989)
- The Gifted One (1989)
- Mothers, Daughters and Lovers (1989)
- Turn Back the Clock (1989)
- Chameleons (1989)
- Follow Your Heart (1990)
- Fall from Grace (1990)
- Last Flight Out (1990)
- Johnny Ryan (1990)
- Camp Cucamonga (1990)
- Kaleidoscope (1990)
- Fine Things (1990)
- Daughters of Privilege (1991)
- Changes (1991)
- Murder in High Places (1991)
- Danielle Steel's 'Palomino' (1991)
- One Special Victory (1991)
- The Story Lady (1991)
- In the Best Interest of the Children (1992)
- Secrets (1992)
- In the Shadow of a Killer (1992)
- Cruel Doubt (1992)
- Danger Island (1992)
- Saved by the Bell: Hawaiian Style (1992)
- Shadow of a Stranger (1992)
- Heartbeat (1993)
- Triumph Over Disaster: The Hurricane Andrew Story (1993)
- Double Deception (1993)
- Danielle Steel's Star (1993)
- Message from Nam (1993)
- Remember (1993)
- Bonanza: The Return (1993)
- Bermuda Grace (1994)
- The Cosby Mysteries (1994)
- Once in a Lifetime (1994)
- One Woman's Courage (1994)
- A Time to Heal (1994)
- Tonya & Nancy: The Inside Story (1994)
- Saved by the Bell: Wedding in Las Vegas (1994)
- Roseanne & Tom: Behind the Scenes (1994)
- A Burning Passion: The Margaret Mitchell Story (1994)
- Abbott and Costello Meet Jerry Seinfeld (1994)
- While Justice Sleeps (1994)
- Bonanza: Under Attack (1995)
- Awake to Danger (1995)
- Vanished (1995)
- Zoya (1995)
- Fight for Justice: The Nancy Conn Story (1995)
- She Fought Alone (1995)
- Her Hidden Truth (1995)
- Mixed Blessings (1995)
- No Greater Love (1996)
- Jack Reed: A Killer Among Us (1996)
- Her Last Chance (1996)
- Seduced by Madness (1996)
- Thrill (1996)
- Full Circle (1996)
- Sweet Dreams (1996)
- Remembrance (1996)
- Night Visitors (1996)
- The Ring (1996)
- Friends 'Til the End (1997)
- Asteroid (1997)
- Murder Live! (1997)
- Born Into Exile (1997)
- Killing Mr. Griffin (1997)
- Sleeping with the Devil (1997)
- Perfect Body (1997)
- Cloned (1997)
- I've Been Waiting for You (1998)
- Witness to the Mob (1998)
- Crime and Punishment (1998)
- The Wrong Girl (1999)
- Vanished Without a Trace (1999)
- The '60s (1999)
- Mutiny (1999)
- Atomic Train (1999)
- The Jesse Ventura Story (1999)
- The Promise (1999)
- Cruel Justice (1999)
- Road Rage (1999)
- A Touch of Hope (1999)
- Countdown to Chaos (1999)
- The David Cassidy Story (2000)
- Homicide: The Movie (2000)
- The '70s (2000)
- In His Life: The John Lennon Story (2000)
- Livin' for Love: The Natalie Cole Story (2000)
- The Pretender 2001 (2001)
- Semper Fi (2001)
- The Judge (2001)
- Submerged (2001)
- The Pretender: Island of the Haunted (2001)
- Dying to Dance (2001)
- Hunter: Return to Justice (2002)
- It's a Very Merry Muppet Christmas Movie (2002)
- War Stories (2003)
- Critical Assembly (2003)
- Saving Jessica Lynch (2003)
- Homeland Security (2004)

=== Universal Content Productions ===
- Operating Constructions (2009)
- Red Faction: Origins (2011)
- Horizon (2013)
- Rewind (2013)
- The Arrangement (2013)
- High Moon (2015)
- Psych: The Movie (2017)
- Psych 2: Lassie Come Home (2020)

=== Sky Studios ===
- Steve McQueen: The Lost Movie (2021)
- Bruno v Tyson (2021)
- Hawking: Can You Hear Me? (2021)
- Haval (2021)

== See also ==
- Universal Television
- Universal Content Productions
