= List of Vanderpump Rules episodes =

Vanderpump Rules is an American reality television series which has been broadcast on Bravo since January 7, 2013. Developed as the first spin-off from The Real Housewives of Beverly Hills, it has aired eleven seasons and focuses on Lisa Vanderpump and the staff at her restaurants and bars; SUR Restaurant & Lounge, Pump Restaurant and Tom Tom, in West Hollywood, California.

== Series overview ==
Season	Episodes	Originally released	
Season	Episodes	First released	Last released
1	10	January 7, 2013	March 11, 2013
2	17	November 4, 2013	February 25, 2014
3	21	November 3, 2014	March 23, 2015
4	24	November 2, 2015	April 11, 2016
5	24	November 7, 2016	April 17, 2017
6	25	December 4, 2017	May 28, 2018
7	24	December 3, 2018	May 20, 2019
8	24	January 7, 2020	June 16, 2020
9	17	September 28, 2021	January 26, 2022
10	19	February 8, 2023	June 14, 2023
11	19	January 30, 2024	May 29, 2024
12	14	December 2, 2025	March 10, 2026

== Episodes ==
=== Season 1 (2013) ===
Lisa Vanderpump from The Real Housewives of Beverly Hills stars. Kristen Doute, Katie Maloney, Tom Sandoval, Stassi Schroeder, Scheana and Jax Taylor are introduced as series regulars.

No. overall	No. in season	Title	Original release date	US viewers (millions)
1	1	"Welcome to SUR"	January 7, 2013	1.85
Lisa Vanderpump's new hire for SUR, Scheana, is ostracized because of her past affair with a married man. Scheana's co-worker, Stassi, the self-proclaimed "leader of the pack" leads the charge against Scheana, labeling her a "homewrecker." Eventually, Scheana, with Lisa's encouragement, stands up to Stassi, serving notice that she's at the restaurant to stay.
2	2	"This Is a Break-Up"	January 14, 2013	1.45
Lisa enlists the help of her SUR staff to celebrate Gay pride with an over-the-top parade float, but when Stassi catches Scheana and Jax flirting, the fighting and fallout threaten to ruin the day. Jax desperately wants to get his relationship with Stassi back on track, but his drunken behavior at a SUR birthday party might be the final straw that ends his relationship with Stassi for good.
3	3	"You Don't Know Jax"	January 21, 2013	1.46
After the blow up at the "Gay pride" event, Lisa struggles to keep the staff's personal conflicts outside of their work at SUR. At a photo shoot, Kristen has an awkward encounter with someone from Tom's past. Jax makes a bold play to win back Stassi, but a shocking revelation pushes her to a new man.
4	4	"Vegas With a Vengeance"	January 28, 2013	1.67
The SUR staff heads to Las Vegas for Stassi's birthday and leaves Lisa very short handed at the restaurant on her busiest night of the week, but Scheana stays back to make sure things run smoothly. Stassi disinvites Jax from Vegas so she can spend the weekend with her new boyfriend Frank, but when Jax crashes the party, a fight breaks out that will divides the group and threatens strong friendships.
5	5	"I'm Not a Bitch"	February 4, 2013	1.67
Stassi comes back from Vegas to find that SUR is not the same, as Jax has started dating one of her friends, and Katie and Kristen have turned against her. When Lisa calls a staff meeting to put a stop to the infighting, Laura-Leigh explodes on Stassi for sending her bullying texts. Scheana nervously prepares for her first live performance at the world-famous Roxy, where after a rocky start, she not only steals the show but makes a very unexpected friend.
6	6	"Caught With Your Trousers Down"	February 11, 2013	1.53
When Jax and Laura-Leigh are caught having sex in SUR's bathroom and Frank insults a customer, Lisa is forced to crack the whip on her staff, resulting in a firing. Stassi thinks her life is back on track when she makes up with her old friend Katie and introduces her new boyfriend Frank to her parents, but when an unexpected argument escalates, Stassi finds herself headed for her second break-up of the summer.
7	7	"In Love With Someone Else"	February 18, 2013	1.39
When Lisa threatens to fire Stassi for neglecting her responsibilities at SUR and as a writer for Lisa's website, Stassi must plead to keep her jobs. Scheana has an emotional breakdown at work when Lisa forbids her to work a party Brandi is attending. Jax makes a bold move to win Stassi back, causing Laura-Leigh to attack Jax for dumping her without an explanation.
8	8	"Last Call"	February 25, 2013	1.45
Lisa organizes a sexy photo-shoot for the staff of SUR, bringing everyone together for an explosive season finale. Scheana attempts to win back Lisa's respect after storming out of her V.I.P. dinner. After a summer of bitter fighting, Kristen and Stassi try to bury the hatchet, and the truth is finally revealed about the rumors surrounding Jax.
9	9	"Reunion"	March 4, 2013	1.45
10	10	"Reunion Secrets"	March 11, 2013	0.91

=== Season 2 (2013–14) ===
No. overall	No. in season	Title	Original release date	US viewers (millions)
11	1	"Tooth or Consequences"	November 4, 2013	1.19
Lisa Vanderpump struggles to keep the unpredictable staff of SUR in line as they cater a Beverly Hills party for Kyle Richards. Jax works to win Stassi back, Kristen deals with a shocking revelation in her relationship with Tom, and Scheana’s birthday ends in a fight that once again turns SUR against her.
12	2	"Branded"	November 11, 2013	1.16
Jax gets a tattoo of Stassi's name to prove his love, but before the ink is even dry, a romantic dinner turns into a shouting match when Stassi reveals there's another guy in her life. Later, Stassi attacks Scheana for turning Lisa against her, and Tom attempts to put together the pieces of his broken relationship with Kristen but finds the instructions hard to follow.
13	3	"Only the Lonely"	November 18, 2013	1.40
Stassi rekindles her romance with Jax when the SUR staff heads to her mom’s house in Lake Arrowhead. Tom prepares for the biggest performance of his career, but a late-night battle with Kristen threatens to derail the weekend. When Scheana complains of yet another injury, Lisa smacks her down for playing the sympathy card.
14	4	"Rumors"	November 25, 2013	1.29
When Stassi finds out about Jax's sexy photo shoot with a female model, she questions whether she can trust him enough to ever love him again. Just when Kristen’s work life and love life appear to be back on track, Lisa brings in a sexy female bartender who may have a romantic past with Tom.
15	5	"Surlesque"	December 2, 2013	1.41
Lisa enlists Stassi and Katie to perform a sexy dance at Guillermo's surprise burlesque birthday party. Jax is confronted with a health scare but receives scorn instead of sympathy from Stassi. Then, Kristen picks a fight to stop the gossiping about Tom and the new bartender.
16	6	"Lisa's Angels"	December 9, 2013	1.38
Lisa and the SUR staff take part in the Gay Pride Parade. Things turn ugly when Stassi finds out that Jax is back to his womanizing ways. Kristen finds new evidence about Tom and Ariana's relationship and confronts them both.
17	7	"Addicted"	December 16, 2013	1.46
Lisa tries to wish Peter a happy 30th birthday, but when Scheana gives Peter an inappropriate lap dance, Katie and Kristen pick a fight and run Scheana out of the party. Stassi accuses Jax of being a sex addict, only to learn that Jax may have slept with one of her best friends.
18	8	"Sherlock Stassi"	December 23, 2013	1.37
After Katie reveals the rumor that Kristen slept with Jax, Stassi hatches an elaborate plan to trick them into confessing. Lisa hires a "secret diner" to evaluate the service at SUR, but the staff is more focused on rumors than customers.
19	9	"Rich People Annoy Me"	December 30, 2013	1.50
When The Real Housewives of Beverly Hills gather for a dinner party at SUR, Stassi and Jax witness firsthand that Lisa's high-class friends can be just as spiteful and vicious as their own. Kristen's obsession over rumors that Tom is hooking up with the pretty new bartender leads to a five-girl shouting match on the night of Lisa's dinner.
20	10	"SUR of the Border"	January 6, 2014	1.49
Lisa's staff heads to Cabo for Stassi's 25th birthday, but a vulgar comment from Scheana turns the celebration into a catfight. When a drunken argument ends with a drink thrown in Katie's face, Stassi lashes out at her friends for taking the spotlight away from her birthday.
21	11	"Ultimatum"	January 13, 2014	1.44
Stassi's Cabo birthday continues to unravel as Jax crashes her booze cruise and brings uninvited guests. Kristen gives Lisa an ultimatum that doesn't sit well with her boss. After a final night of drinking, Kristen's shocking decision forever changes her friendships.
22	12	"Til Death Do Us Part"	January 20, 2014	1.53
Lisa and Stassi throw Scheana the perfect surprise engagement. Tom lashes out at Jax for his part in the cheating rumors, but later shocks Stassi with his own news. Kristen’s meltdown at SUR causes her friends to retreat and support her archrival, Ariana.
23	13	"Bitch Slap"	January 27, 2014	1.87
When Stassi believes that Kristen committed the ultimate betrayal, she devises a plan to expose her in front of all of her friends. Lisa struggles to keep SUR's working dynamics under control when tensions between Jax, Tom, Stassi and Kristen reach all-time highs.
24	14	"I Lied"	February 3, 2014	1.91
SUR's sexy annual photo shoot turns tearful as Stassi attacks Jax for his womanizing, and Lisa helps Tom deal with the growing evidence of Kristen's infidelity. Things come to an explosive head at Scheana's engagement party when Kristen and Tom finally face off with Stassi and Jax.
25	15	"Reunion — Part 1"	February 10, 2014	2.24
26	16	"Reunion — Part 2"	February 17, 2014	1.78
27	17	"Secrets Revealed"	February 25, 2014	1.30

=== Season 3 (2014–15) ===
Ariana Madix and Tom Schwartz are promoted to series regulars.

No. overall	No. in season	Title	Original release date	US viewers (millions)
28	1	"Instafight"	November 3, 2014	1.25
Lisa Vanderpump still rules over everything at SUR, but no longer rules over Stassi, who returns from New York to find everything has changed between her and her former friends. Meanwhile, Jax prepares for plastic surgery, Scheana plans her perfect birthday party, and Tom Sandoval sparks a romance with Ariana, but all happiness is jeopardized when Kristen digs up a secret that will rock everyone.
29	2	"All Fired Up"	November 10, 2014	1.37
On the eve of her largest restaurant opening yet, Lisa must dole out harsh punishments to the SUR staff for their appalling behavior at Scheana's birthday party. Jax tries to do the right thing by choosing between his two girlfriends, but finds honesty has its downfalls. Stassi coaches Tom Schwartz on how to charm Lisa into giving him a fair shot at his new job at PUMP.
30	3	"Grand Opening and Closure"	November 17, 2014	1.29
After going over the budget and past schedule, Lisa struggles to make the grand opening of PUMP a huge success. Stassi confronts Scheana over her mean-spirited tweets, but Scheana maintains she only retweeted what someone else already said. Kristen seeks closure with Tom Sandoval, but watching Ariana take her place triggers her innermost feelings for her ex-boyfriend.
31	4	"Jax 'Nose' Best"	November 24, 2014	1.02
Stassi reconnects with the SUR crowd at a Hollywood party, but Scheana and Kristen make sure she doesn't enjoy a happy homecoming. Jax learns who his real friends are when he undergoes a painful nose job. Tom Schwartz suffers a panic attack and runs out on his job at PUMP, infuriating both Katie and Lisa Vanderpump.
32	5	"In the Doghouse"	December 1, 2014	1.38
Kristen and Tom Sandoval return to SUR after their suspensions. Tom Schwartz adopts a puppy to delay marriage talks with Katie, but their relationship is tested when Jax spreads rumors that Katie cheated. And Lisa gives Stassi a special opportunity to style her for a cover photo shoot, which ends up with both women feeling underappreciated by the other.
33	6	"Kiss and Tell"	December 8, 2014	1.14
Kristen reveals that Tom Schwartz may be cheating on Katie. Katie interrogates the SUR staff about Schwartz's infidelity and discovers they know more than expected. Lisa hosts the "50 Gay Mayors" event at PUMP.
34	7	"New Girl, Old Grudges"	December 15, 2014	1.23
With Gay Pride coming up, Lisa hires a new hostess named Vail, who immediately catches the attention of Jax. Stassi slams Tom Schwartz for remaining friends with Jax, but Schwartz believes her anger is just a grudge against her ex-boyfriend. James feels the strain of Kristen's ongoing obsession with Tom and Ariana.
35	8	"Don't Mind the Jax"	December 22, 2014	1.18
Jax pursues new SUR hostess Vail, but gets caught up in a lie about his current girlfriend. James tries to clear the air with Tom Sandoval before Scheana's bachelorette party in Miami, but Kristen's lingering obsession is too much for them to overcome. Katie and Tom seek couples' therapy to save their relationship.
36	9	"What Happens in San Diego"	December 29, 2014	1.25
Lisa advises Scheana to invite Stassi and Katie to her bachelorette party in Miami, but Stassi wants to boycott the celebration. Jax's girlfriend Tiffany hooks the guys up with a VIP weekend in San Diego; however, a night of drinking and debauchery leaves Tom Sandoval accusing Jax of going too far.
37	10	"Bachelorette Beach Party"	January 5, 2015	1.31
The SUR crew puts aside their differences to celebrate Scheana's bachelorette party in Miami with sun, sand, and a lot of liquor. Jax pursues Vail, but Tom Sandoval calls him out for his lying, womanizing ways. When a PUMP manager quits, Lisa calls on the one person she knows can fill the important role: her daughter, Pandora.
38	11	"Tears Over Miami"	January 12, 2015	1.19
Jax reunites with an old friend at Scheana's Miami Beach bachelorette party, making the group wonder if Jax is hiding secrets about his sexual past. Tom Sandoval makes a tearful plea to Kristen to stop harassing Ariana, and Lisa confronts Stassi for cutting Katie out of her life.
39	12	"Stand Against Stassi"	January 19, 2015	1.37
When Stassi refuses to forgive Katie for attending Scheana's bachelorette party, Katie must either fight for her friendship or cut Stassi out of her life. Peter mistakes Vail's flirting for interest and asks her on a date that quickly turns awkward. Kristen connects with the girl Tom Sandoval allegedly cheated with in hopes of finally breaking up his relationship with Ariana.
40	13	"Miami Vices"	January 26, 2015	1.58
Kristen creates chaos at SUR when she ambushes Tom Sandoval with the girl he allegedly slept with in Miami. Scheana erupts at Kristen over her actions, causing a huge scene in front of customers. Lisa jumps to action to keep SUR running and discipline her staff after Miami Girl's disruption. Katie adjusts to life without Stassi.
41	14	"Judgement Day"	February 2, 2015	1.69
Lisa confronts Kristen over her disrespect of management and arrives at a final decision on her future at SUR. Tom Schwartz makes a shocking revelation to Katie about the past. Scheana debates whether to disinvite Kristen from her wedding.
42	15	"For Better or Worse"	February 9, 2015	1.58
The SUR crew comes together for Scheana's wedding, but Scheana melts down as the day of her dreams spirals into a nightmare. James confronts Kristen over her continued obsession with Tom Sandoval. Jax, Tom Sandoval, and Tom Schwartz debate the merits of marriage.
43	16	"Ring on a String"	February 16, 2015	1.49
Scheana breaks down when her plan for a perfect wedding falls apart. Kristen lives up to everyone's worst expectations when she fights with James at the reception. Tom Schwartz makes a bad situation worse when his apology gift to Katie leads to tears.
44	17	"Jax Cracks"	February 23, 2015	1.48
Jax struggles to stay loyal to Tom, but Stassi teaches Kristen how to make Jax reveal Tom's alleged cheating. James apologizes to Kristen to salvage their relationship. Lisa teams up with Lance Bass to host a puppy adoption at PUMP.
45	18	"Dethroned"	March 2, 2015	1.55
SUR's annual photo shoot turns tense as Tom Sandoval confronts Jax for stabbing him in the back. Katie forces Tom Schwartz to take action in their relationship, while Tom Sandoval and Ariana take their own relationship to a whole new level. While Stassi accepts Lisa's invitation to the restaurant's anniversary party, she finds returning to SUR more tense than nostalgic.
46	19	"Reunion — Part 1"	March 9, 2015	1.44
47	20	"Reunion — Part 2"	March 16, 2015	1.46
48	21	"Secrets Revealed"	March 23, 2015	0.95

=== Season 4 (2015–16) ===
James Kennedy is promoted to series regular.

No. overall	No. in season	Title	Original release date	US viewers (millions)
49	1	"Playtime's Over"	November 2, 2015	1.24
Lisa Vanderpump vows to take SUR restaurant to new heights. Scheana throws a costume party for her 30th birthday, but when Kristen shows up Ariana and Sandoval accuse Scheana of being a fake friend. James's reckless behavior threatens his DJ career, Schwartz realizes he's ready to commit to Katie, and a visit from Jax's mother offers rare insight into his life before SUR. Lisa Vanderpump and Tom Sandoval also have a verbal dispute, which results in Ken Todd confronting him. The Sur staff also have a triple birthday party. Scheana Turns 30. Jax's mother turns 60 in her debut on the show.
50	2	"New Blood"	November 9, 2015	1.14
When Lisa Vanderpump brings new blood to the shark-infested waters of SUR, Katie and Scheana quickly teach new girl Lala that there's no such thing as a secret at Lisa's restaurant. Rumors spread that James was unfaithful to Kristen, and Kristen must make a tough choice about whom to believe. Jax imports a new girlfriend from Kentucky and Scheana continues to feel the heat from Ariana over her friendship with Kristen.
51	3	"Pretty Little Lies"	November 16, 2015	1.26
When Scheana and Katie bust Lala for lying about a modeling job in Italy, Lisa Vanderpump turns the table on them for picking on the new girl. Scheana worries her marriage may be in danger when it's revealed that her husband has been keeping secrets. Tom and Ariana try "adulting," Jax and James compete for Lala's affection and Tom Schwartz makes a big step towards committing to Katie.
52	4	"Happily Never After"	November 23, 2015	1.20
Lisa Vanderpump and the SUR crew force Scheana to reassess her marriage now that Shay's secret life is out in the open. Jax campaigns to get his new flame a job at SUR, even while things heat up between him and Lala. Sandoval and Schwartz pitch Lisa a business plan. Kristen and James seek couple's therapy.
53	5	"Cock of the Walk"	November 30, 2015	1.35
Convinced that Kristen is cheating on him, James seeks revenge by hooking up with Lala. Lisa schools her staff on fine wine, Katie and Ariana urge Scheana not to sweep marital problems under the rug, Peter chops his ponytail, and a jealous Jax recruits Kristen in his scheme to pull Lala away from James.
54	6	"Love Bites"	December 7, 2015	1.37
Lisa tries to outdo herself by throwing not one but two huge parties for Gay Pride. When James shows up flaunting fresh love bites, everyone wants to know which SUR girl was responsible. Sandoval and Schwartz kickstart Shay's makeover, Scheana doubles down on her marriage, and Jax seizes an opportunity to move in on Lala.
55	7	"Spit Take"	December 14, 2015	1.29
Lisa treats a group of underprivileged kids to the full SUR experience, including a serving of bad behavior from her staff. Jax stands up for Kristen when her break up with James turns ugly. Ariana's mood sours when Sandoval contemplates going to Vegas without her, Schwartz and Sandoval fail to impress with their business plan, and Jax asks Brittany to move in with him.
56	8	"Dirty Thirty"	December 21, 2015	1.27
Ariana reveals the emotional reasons why she wants Tom Sandoval to stick around after her birthday, to little effect. Lisa advises the girls to get back at their boyfriends for going to Vegas, so Lala, Katie and Ariana literally kiss and make up at Scheana's sleepover. Jax, Schwartz and Sandoval strive to be loyal to their girlfriends, but struggle to keep their pants on in Sin City.
57	9	"What Happened in Vegas"	December 28, 2015	1.53
Sandoval and Schwartz learn that not all that happens in Vegas stays in Vegas when they surprise their girlfriends with shocking news from their trip. Kristen returns to SUR and apologizes to Ariana, but Ariana is not ready to forgive and forget. Lisa helps Katie examine Schwartz's commitment issues, Sandoval and Ariana take the stage at the Improv, James tries to sabotage Jax's love life, and a visit from Sandoval's mom sheds light on his pre-SUR life.
58	10	"No Strings Attached"	January 4, 2016	1.45
Tom Schwartz finally mans up and plans to get down on one knee for Katie, but Lisa Vanderpump worries that his complicated proposal scheme will end in disaster. Brittany moving in with Jax doesn't stop him from moving in on Lala. Ariana's attitude drives Scheana and Katie closer to Kristen, Sandoval tries to correct a huge mistake, and Kristen and James get left out in the cold when the SUR crew plans a tropical vacation.
59	11	"Fully Engaged"	January 11, 2016	1.47
Stassi has been sniffing around SUR, but Lisa Vanderpump wants her to keep her distance. Scheana and Ariana discover that their friendship may be more damaged than they ever knew. With the SUR crew headed to Hawaii for Jax and Tom's birthdays, James plots to get invited on the trip. Kristen attempts to make peace with Sandoval, newly engaged Katie takes her engagement ring on a victory lap at SUR, and Faith and Lala skinny dip in the most unlikely of places.
60	12	"Leis, Liquor and Lies"	January 18, 2016	1.78
The SUR gang travels to Hawaii to celebrate Jax and Tom's birthdays, bringing their conflicts with them. Lala tries to come clean about her flirtation with Jax, but Jax refuses to accept any blame. Tom discovers Scheana sent negative texts about him to Ariana's mom. Katie lashes out when Lala skinny dips in front of Schwartz, and Lisa Vanderpump frets over Max from 3,000 miles away.
61	13	"The Bitch Is Back"	January 25, 2016	1.60
While the SUR crew parties in Hawaii, Stassi visits Kristen in LA and finally reveals the truth about her sex tape. Ariana rejects Scheana's fake apologies, and Tom strikes back with an attack on Scheana's marriage. Lala kicks James out of bed for an equipment malfunction, Scheana worries about Shay's drinking, and just hours before leaving paradise, Jax winds up in jail.
62	14	"Sex, Lies and Stassi's Videotape"	February 1, 2016	1.53
Accused of felony shoplifting, Jax must answer to the courts, his girlfriend, and Lisa Vanderpump. Stassi finally tells the whole story of her sex tape crisis, and returns to SUR to repay Lisa for helping her keep the tape from leaking. James and Lala can't keep their hands off each other at a racy photoshoot, Scheana and Shay toast the end of a rocky first year of marriage, and Kristen deals with a "Stage 5 Clinger" boyfriend.
63	15	"Pucker & Pout"	February 8, 2016	1.52
After months of hard work, Katie launches her website with a high-profile party, but a surprise appearance from James and an unexpected text message from Stassi threaten to ruin the event. Jax adjusts to his new life as an unemployed outlaw while Brittany adjusts to her new life as sole breadwinner. Lisa Vanderpump puts James in his place, Lala reacts to an ugly rumor, and Tom Schwartz takes Stassi to task.
64	16	"Bitch Ghost"	February 15, 2016	1.45
When Stassi runs into her old SUR crew at Lala's house party, Scheana must finally answer for her part in Stassi's sex tape scandal. A humiliated Jax brags about his girlfriend's breast enhancement and tries to assert his social dominance, but his friends are not impressed. Tom Sandoval works on a new single, Kristen continues her serial dating, and Tom Schwartz lands in hot water with Katie when he quits his job for Lisa Vanderpump.
65	17	"Beach, Please"	February 22, 2016	1.55
After Tom Sandoval forces Jax to answer for his recent bad behavior, Jax cheers himself up by buying Brittany a boob job. Lisa is faced with a big decision when James makes a scene at PUMP. Sandoval lasers the tattoo off his butt, Katie's beach party gets even hotter when Kristen and Ariana have it out, and Ariana makes a stunning statement that leaves both Scheana and Katie speechless.
66	18	"Too Little, Too Late"	February 29, 2016	1.42
Against Lisa's better advice, Katie surprises Stassi in Palm Springs. James convinces himself that Kristen is still the answer to all his problems, even after getting him fired. Scheana worries that she's losing her friends, Tequila Katie rears her ugly head, and Jax, Tom Schwartz and Peter try their hand at babysitting.
67	19	"Just the T.I.P"	March 7, 2016	1.51
Katie begs Lisa Vanderpump to have her engagement party at Villa Rosa, but Lisa balks at having Stassi and Kristen on the guest list. Faced with a looming criminal court date, Jax questions everything in his life, including moving in with girlfriend Brittany. Katie enlists Scheana to help plan her engagement party, Sandoval hopes to launch his music career by shooting a video, and James and Kristen pour gasoline on their old flame.
68	20	"Push Comes to Shove"	March 14, 2016	1.44
Lisa Vanderpump hosts the biggest party of the year: Katie and Tom Schwartz's engagement. Guests of dishonor Kristen and Stassi stir up trouble, and trash-talking Lala creates a scene. Jax must atone for his crimes first in a criminal court, then in a much-anticipated reunion with Stassi. Tom Sandoval debuts his new song in a live performance at SUR, Scheana confronts Ariana, and Lala gets close to both Kristen and James.
69	21	"Reunion Part 1"	March 21, 2016	1.43
70	22	"Reunion Part 2"	March 28, 2016	1.44
71	23	"Reunion Part 3"	April 4, 2016	1.18
72	24	"Secrets Revealed"	April 7, 2016	0.75

=== Season 5 (2016–17) ===
Stassi Schroeder returns as a series regular.

No. overall	No. in season	Title	Original release date	US viewers (millions)
73	1	"Summer Bodies"	November 7, 2016	1.44
Lisa Vanderpump's SUR Restaurant is hotter than ever, but the conflict within her staff is at an all-time high when Jax jeopardizes the best relationship he's ever had after spreading a shocking rumor involving his girlfriend Brittany and Kristen. Meanwhile, Stassi rallies the girls against James and Lala for fat shaming bride-to-be Katie, but Schwartz worries Stassi's return has brought out the worst in his fiancée. Finally, the group uncovers a bit of scandalous gossip about Lala's love life.
74	2	"What Went Down"	November 14, 2016	1.42
Lisa organizes a huge dog charity event with the help of the SUR staff and Katie on board as her assistant. Later, Brittany threatens to leave Jax for spreading rumors of her sexual encounter with Kristen all over SUR, and James embarks on an "apology tour" for the horrible things he said to Scheana and Katie. Meanwhile, Tom Schwartz asks for a pre-nuptial agreement as he panics at the skyrocketing budget of his upcoming wedding.
75	3	"Call It Like I See It"	November 21, 2016	1.36
Stassi, Brittany, Scheana and Kristen are all asked to be a part of Katie's bridal party, but Ariana is left out in the cold as a result of her friendship with Lala. Meanwhile, Schwartz serves up Jax and Sandoval a spicy revenge for their years of hazing, and Katie questions Scheana's loyalty after spotting her getting cozy with Lala.
76	4	"Thirsty Girls"	November 28, 2016	1.25
Scheana shuts down Lala's attempts at friendship in an effort to please Katie and her bridesmaids. Meanwhile, James is flying high when his pageant queen girlfriend comes to town for the summer, but the fun doesn't last after the new SUR hostess claims she slept with him. Later, Katie lashes out at Schwartz after learning he's secretly seeking therapy, causing him serious concern for the upcoming wedding. Finally, Jax eagerly watches as James puts his job at SUR in jeopardy.
77	5	"Cold Feet"	December 5, 2016	1.60
Katie and Schwartz take a trip to scout their wedding venue, but when Schwartz shows signs of cold feet, Katie hits him below the belt. Meanwhile, Tom takes Ariana on a romantic date but discovers that he wants marriage and kids more than she does. Scheana learns a scandalous rumor about Lala, while Lala learns two scandalous rumors about James. Lisa advises Katie to mend her relationship before the wedding.
78	6	"Pride"	December 12, 2016	1.40
When terrorism strikes the Orlando gay community and threatens West Hollywood, Lisa puts her own safety aside to ride in the Pride Parade, rally SUR, and bring the community together. Meanwhile, Tom's jealousy over Ariana's bartending book sparks the nastiest fight of their relationship. Stassi plans a birthday trip to Montauk and James questions his friendship with Lala when the stories about her boyfriend continue to change.
79	7	"The Sociopath Test"	December 19, 2016	1.44
Scheana and Kristen throw a surprise party for Shay and Carter, but Scheana gets surprised when Stassi and Katie attack her for sympathizing with Lala. Jax reveals himself to be a certifiable sociopath on Stassi's podcast. Lisa gives Brittany advice on how to deal with relationship jealousy, and Ariana stands up for Scheana.
80	8	"No Show"	December 26, 2016	1.27
After a vicious fight with Stassi and Katie, Scheana must decide whether she'll still go with them on Stassi's birthday trip to Montauk. Meanwhile, Lala begins to dread Ariana's Sonoma birthday trip when she learns she'll be stuck in close quarters with Jax. Lisa must decide whether to rehire James after he makes a sincere plea to get his DJ job back.
81	9	"The Talk of Montauk"	January 2, 2017	1.21
Sandoval, Schwartz and Jax vow not to let Lala's no-show ruin Ariana's birthday weekend in Sonoma. Meanwhile, Stassi's Montauk birthday trip is off to a rocky start when she breaks down in tears over her recent split, and Katie and Kristen fail to find Stassi an eligible Hamptons suitor. Later, Lisa learns troubling news about Lala's situation, and Scheana feels like an outsider when she doesn't embrace Stassi's birthday traditions.
82	10	"Summer House Rules"	January 9, 2017	1.17
Stassi continues her birthday trip at a Montauk clambake, where Katie finds Stassi potential new bachelors and Scheana and Kristen commit some seafood faux pas. Lala finally resurfaces to explain her disappearance, but Lisa isn't buying her wild lies. Ariana celebrates her birthday with Sandoval and Schwartz at a thrilling NASCAR race, but things grow tense after Jax disrespects Brittany. Later, Kristen, Katie and Scheana party at the Wirkus Twins' summer house, and sparks fly when Stassi finds herself alone in a hot tub with a handsome, young and successful New Yorker. The second half of the episode served as a series preview for Summer House.
83	11	"The D Pic"	January 16, 2017	1.31
Kristen upsets Brittany by using a picture of Jax's genitals in her comedy show. Meanwhile, Lala returns to SUR to apologize for missing Ariana's birthday, but Tom refuses to forgive her. Later, Brittany's mom arrives from Kentucky and puts the pressure on Jax to join a church and marry her daughter. Lisa surprises Katie with a risqué bridal shower gift and Ariana drops a bomb on Stassi, leaving her stunned.
84	12	"Jax's Roast"	January 23, 2017	1.32
Sandoval decides to celebrate his birthday with a "Fund-Rager" to raise money for a good cause, but things go south when Scheana accuses James of cheating in front of his girlfriend. Meanwhile, Kristen hosts a roast for Jax, but Jax isn't too thrilled when Brittany's mom reacts to a rumor from his past. Later, Scheana reveals that her marriage isn't perfect, Lisa chastises Katie and Schwartz for constantly fighting, and Katie decides to get a medical marijuana card in an attempt to mellow out.
85	13	"Ambush"	January 30, 2017	1.41
Schwartz tries to make peace between Ariana and Stassi, but Katie gets annoyed when Ariana refuses to play nice. Meanwhile, James is excited to play his biggest DJ set since being fired from SUR, but the gig is ruined when Jax, Scheana, Kristen and two alleged mistresses ambush James to expose his cheating ways. Finally, Lisa gives Katie valuable wedding advice and Schwartz gets his prenup, only to learn that he doesn't have much to protect.
86	14	"Into the Closet"	February 6, 2017	1.30
A tearful Stassi gets some hard relationship advice from her little brother. Meanwhile, Sandoval attempts to reignite his career by diving back into modeling and acting in Peter's sci-fi movie. Later, Pandora throws Katie a relaxing spa day but things grow tense when Ariana refuses to apologize to Stassi and Katie's attacks brings Scheana to tears. Finally, Sandoval, Jax and Ariana raid Lisa's fabulous closet to fulfill Schwartz's dream of dressing in drag for his bachelor party.
87	15	"Beads, Beers and Tears"	February 13, 2017	1.17
Scheana throws a pre-New Orleans pool party but when Tom and Katie's fighting reaches a new level, the group wonders if they should get married at all. Meanwhile, when Lisa allows James to DJ a party at PUMP James makes a play to get his old job back. Later, the bachelor/bachelorette party kicks off with plenty of Bourbon Street debauchery, but Sandoval stirs up trouble when he tells Katie she needs therapy. Stassi confronts Jax about his past mistakes resulting in tears from Jax and jealousy from Brittany.
88	16	"Man Tears and Braziers"	February 20, 2017	1.46
Ariana and the groomsmen go on a manly gator tour, but when talk turns to Schwartz's relationship troubles the boys are reduced to tears. Meanwhile, gender stereotypes are flipped when Kristen hires a female stripper for the girls while the boys tuck in, tape up, and get beautiful in full drag. Back at SUR, Lisa tests out new dishes in hopes of spicing up the menu. Finally, Kristen reveals the root of Katie's anger towards Schwartz all summer, sparking a massive fight between angry drag queens, bitter boyfriends and scorned fiancés.
89	17	"Drag Battle"	February 27, 2017	1.43
The epic New Orleans blowout continues late into the night, with Schwartz and Sandoval – still in full drag – fiercely refuting the cheating accusations. Meanwhile, Stassi realizes her past fights with Katie caused her to miss a painful moment when Katie needed her most. Later, Kristen confronts Sandoval about trying to ruin her new relationship, and Stassi pays her dad and grandmother a nostalgic visit on the day they're moving out of her childhood home. Finally, Katie and Schwartz bury their issues on a wild last night in Nola, featuring a scandalous game of spin the bottle. Back in LA, Lisa talks to Ken about partnering up with Tom Sandoval to open a new bar.
90	18	"Regrets Only"	March 6, 2017	1.34
Lisa forces Katie and Tom to reexamine their entire relationship when she declines to officiate their wedding. Meanwhile, Stassi fumbles through her first blind date with the help of Kristen's questionable romantic advice. Lisa organizes another sexy SUR photo shoot, with Tom and Ariana wearing nothing but food.
91	19	"Triple Trouble"	March 13, 2017	1.33
When Lala returns to SUR, Lisa makes it clear that her behavior will no longer be tolerated. Jax and Sandavol arrange to fly in Schwartz's brothers a surprise. Scheena announces her plan to have a baby despite her relationship issues with Shay. And Stassi poses for a nearly nude photo shoot. Katie and Tom arrive at their wedding venue.
92	20	"Taco Tuesday, Wedding Wednesday"	March 20, 2017	1.41
Katie and Tom's wedding is finally here and the whole group comes together to show their support. Jax and Tom give Schwartz the ultimate wedding surprise when they fly in his triplet brothers. Meanwhile, Stassi is moved to tears when she and Lisa finally bury the hatchet. Finally, Scheana insists her relationship with Shay is perfect, but Lisa suspects she may be hiding something.
93	21	"Introducing Mr. & Mrs. Schwartz"	March 27, 2017	1.56
Lisa officiates the woodsy elegant ceremony that only Katie and Tom could pull off. Jax re-evaluates his relationship with Brittany, and Ariana considers taking her relationship to the next step with Sandoval. Meanwhile, Lisa offers the Toms the business opportunity of a lifetime, but Schwartz fears making two commitments in one day. Scheana reveals a dark secret about her marriage that will change the rest of her life.
94	22	"Reunion Part 1"	April 3, 2017	1.38
95	23	"Reunion Part 2"	April 10, 2017	1.26
96	24	"Reunion Part 3"	April 17, 2017	1.43

=== Season 6 (2017–18) ===
Brittany Cartwright and Lala Kent are promoted to series regulars.

No. overall	No. in season	Title	Original release date	US viewers (millions)
—	—	"How They Got Here 2017"	November 27, 2017	0.91
97	1	"Masquerade"	December 4, 2017	1.39
Freshly divorced Scheana throws a lavish masquerade birthday party to show off her new boyfriend, but things get tense when she leaves Katie and Stassi off the guest list. Sandoval jeopardizes his and Schwartz's new restaurant partnership with Lisa when she overhears him complaining about her management style. Finally, a vicious rumor circulates that could destroy a relationship for good.
98	2	"UnFaithful"	December 11, 2017	1.50
A painful revelation makes Brittany flee L.A., leaving her relationship with Jax in question. Stassi reconnects with her ex-boyfriend Patrick and ex-boss Lisa Vanderpump, while James attempts to reclaim his DJ job at SUR. Lisa proudly serves as grand marshal of the Long Beach Gay Pride parade, where Sandoval discovers a new fetish he hopes will revive his and Ariana's lagging sex life.
99	3	"Back in the Saddle"	December 18, 2017	1.28
Brittany's girlfriends put aside their differences and throw a Kentucky-themed party to help cure her heartache, but the group learns Jax's indiscretion may not have been a one-time thing. When Ariana gets thrown off of her horse during practice, she must learn how to get back in the saddle. Lala returns to SUR to ask for Lisa's forgiveness—and her old job.
100	4	"Absinthe-Minded"	January 1, 2018	1.28
When Lala learns Katie has been talking about her relationship again, she drops a bombshell that could break Katie's heart. Schwartz and Sandoval try to prove their commitment to partnering with Lisa Vanderpump by making the biggest investment of their lives. Stassi struggles as SUR's new event planner, while Jax and James forge an unlikely friendship with the help of some absinthe.
101	5	"Sex, Lies and Audiotape"	January 8, 2018	1.53
Jax convinces Brittany to host a housewarming party in an attempt to prove their relationship is mended, but the evening devolves into madness when a devastating audio recording surfaces. Lisa and Katie take Schwartz to task after his latest drunken blackout, while Kristen must tell Scheana that her boyfriend Rob may not be as perfect as he seems. Ariana reveals the heartbreaking reason for her body image struggles.
102	6	"See You Next Tuesday"	January 15, 2018	1.48
Ariana's role in releasing Jax's scandalous audio recording leads to a fight with Sandoval that threatens their relationship, while Scheana and Katie strike a truce to stay out of each other’s relationships. At SUR, James hustles to make sure his first DJ event is a smashing success, Lisa marvels at Brittany's dedication to Jax, and Lala bonds with Billie, the restaurant's new hostess.
103	7	"It's Not About the Pasta"	January 22, 2018	1.64
Scheana spirals out of control when she suspects Rob is pulling away, forcing Lisa to come to her rescue. Stassi assists in dressing the staff for SUR's annual Gay Pride celebration, while James erupts on Lala after she insults his girlfriend. Jax turns to an unlikely form of therapy in order to come to terms with his anger and infidelity.
104	8	"Best Mates"	January 29, 2018	1.54
Kristen tests Jax's patience when she flies out Brittany's mom for a visit, especially when it turns out that she has another surprise up her sleeve. Lala finds her inner feminist and schemes to repair Scheana and Katie's friendship, Lisa rewards Peter for years of loyal service, and a salacious rumor about James and his best friend makes the rounds at SUR.
105	9	"Call Me Jason"	February 5, 2018	1.48
Stassi helps organize a party to honor Lisa Vanderpump's new role at Beverly Hills Lifestyle magazine, but struggles to convince her bitter ex-coworkers to lend a hand. Schwartz's triplet brothers come for a visit and a Tom Sandoval makeover, Jax's anger issues send him running back to reiki therapy, and Katie finds herself the victim of body-shaming comments. Lisa must find a way to reopen SUR after a fire nearly puts the restaurant permanently out of commission.
106	10	"Screams and Queens"	February 12, 2018	1.35
Birthday twins and perpetual rivals Stassi and Ariana plan extravagant parties on the same night, but while Ariana shines as the belle of the ball, an embarrassed Stassi runs off in tears. Meanwhile, Schwartz and Sandoval celebrate the approval of TomTom's permits by writing hefty checks, Lisa punishes Jax for ruining her big night, and Sandoval and Ariana work through their intimacy issues.
107	11	"It's All Happening"	February 19, 2018	1.36
Lisa channels all her energy into restoring SUR after the devastating fire. On the heels of her birthday meltdown, Stassi consults a tarot card reader about her future with Patrick, while Scheana invites a select group of friends to visit Rob's prized cabin in Big Bear. James makes a startling admission about his feelings for Lala, and Jax feels left behind in the wake of Tom and Tom's success.
108	12	"Wishful Sinking"	February 26, 2018	1.35
In Big Bear, Jax cheats death when an attempt to show off goes horribly wrong. Raquel questions whether James still harbors romantic feelings for Lala, Ariana gets upset when Sandoval doesn’t invite her on a business trip to Las Vegas, and Rob reveals that he doesn't tell Scheana he loves her – providing Jax with fresh gossip to spread. Back in Los Angeles, Stassi interviews Lisa for her podcast, and Katie and Schwartz share date night.
109	13	"Vegas! Baby?"	March 5, 2018	1.30
Lisa takes Sandoval and Schwartz on a business trip to Las Vegas to design their new bar, but when the guys focus more on partying than professionalism, Lisa questions the whole partnership. Meanwhile in Vegas, Brittany tells Katie and Ariana she needs to take a pregnancy test, and everyone is shocked by Jax's reaction to the results. Back in L.A., Lala reaches out to former frenemy, Stassi, to help plan her debut musical event, and Stassi urges Lala to confront the wildcard that could sabotage her performance, James Kennedy.
110	14	"Watch Your Back"	March 12, 2018	1.43
Brittany spoils Jax on his 38th birthday, but he shows his lack of maturity when confronted with a reminder of his infidelity. Seeking revenge on Jax for telling people Rob doesn't love her, Scheana sets Brittany up with SUR's hottest new model and bartender. Ariana's brother asks out new SUR hostess Billie Lee, but when Stassi questions Jeremy's character, Ariana responds with fierce sisterly protection. James has an emotional reunion with his Dad, and Sandoval and Schwartz must redeem themselves with Lisa after a disastrous Vegas business trip.
111	15	"Nothing Here for Me"	March 19, 2018	1.50
Brittany tries to get her relationship back on track by taking the group to Mexico for Jax's birthday, but Jax blindsides Brittany with the news he's considering moving to Florida for a job. James delights in being invited on Jax's trip, Sandoval and Schwartz finally impress Lisa by creating innovative cocktails for TomTom, and Stassi and Lala take Jax to task for always putting his needs above Brittany's.
112	16	"SUR Going South"	March 26, 2018	1.36
The Mexico adventure continues as the group explores a natural water park, Playa del Carmen nightlife, and a little local spot called "SUR". James tries to remain in Jax's favor by exposing Scheana's role in hooking up Brittany with the hot new barback, Stassi and Kristen clash over Kristen's vacation meltdowns, and Lisa predicts that a volatile romantic triangle at SUR will end explosively.
113	17	"The Smoking Gun"	April 2, 2018	1.49
James takes over the DJ booth at a Mexican club. Jax confronts Scheana for setting up Brittany with another man. Stassi realizes her relationship is in trouble, and the rumor mill works overtime when exes Kristen and James share a night on the beach.
114	18	"Karma's a Bitch"	April 9, 2018	1.59
After returning to LA, Kristen must tell her boyfriend about the night she spent with James. Sandoval convinces Lisa to throw a "progress party" to show off the TomTom space. Jax has an epic meltdown in front of staff, customers, and Lisa herself.
115	19	"Reiki Breaky Heart"	April 16, 2018	1.59
Ariana and Brittany seek relationship advice from Lisa, while Stassi throws a party to relaunch Katie's beauty blog. Carter, questions Sandoval about Kristen's night in Mexico with James. Katie and Tom celebrate their first wedding anniversary.
116	20	"Lost Cause"	April 23, 2018	1.44
After a painful breakup, Brittany bounces back with new swagger, a new outlook, and her sights set on a new man. Ariana blows up at Sandoval for choosing to support Jax over spending time with her, Lisa gives Stassi relationship advice, and Kristen tries to convince Carter of her loyalty. Lala takes the stage with James for the biggest musical performance of her career.
117	21	"Welcome to TomTom"	April 30, 2018	1.51
Sandoval and Schwartz give their friends a sneak peek at TomTom, but a cloud hangs over the party as Lisa must decide Jax's future at SUR. Scheana makes a last-ditch effort to connect with Rob, James receives huge news about his DJ career, and Stassi introduces Lisa to her boyfriend with catastrophically awkward results. Brittany unleashes three months of pent up anger and frustration at Jax.
118	22	"Reunion Part One"	May 7, 2018	1.58
119	23	"Reunion Part Two"	May 14, 2018	1.46
120	24	"Reunion Part Three"	May 21, 2018	1.37
121	25	"Secrets Revealed"	May 28, 2018	0.75

=== Season 7 (2018–19) ===
No. overall	No. in season	Title	Original release date	US viewers (millions)
122	1	"A Decent Proposal"	December 3, 2018	1.25
Lisa Vanderpump finds herself behind schedule on TomTom, the new bar she's opening with Tom Sandoval and Tom Schwartz. James finds himself in hot water with the group after he upsets Jax and Brittany with an offensive rap, Scheana settles into single life, and Stassi revels in the "honeymoon phase" of her new romance. Jax makes a grand gesture to prove he's a new man when he proposes marriage to Brittany.
123	2	"Hope and Pride"	December 10, 2018	1.17
Stassi plans an epic surprise party to celebrate Jax and Brittany's engagement, but Sandoval and Ariana question Jax's ability to commit to one woman for the rest of his life. James attempts to work his way back into the group's good graces, unaware that Kristen has hatched a plan that might ruin his romance and banish him for good. Stassi seeks Lisa's approval for her new beau Beau, and Lisa must decide whether Jax deserves another chance to work at SUR.
124	3	"Either Him or Me"	December 16, 2018	1.27
James spirals out of control after being ambushed by Kristen at Pride, while his girlfriend Raquel struggles to accept new rumors about his alleged infidelity. Jax and Brittany decide to start a beer cheese company together, Tom Schwartz takes James to task for insulting Katie, and Scheana feels threatened by Stassi and Ariana's newfound friendship. When Katie is the victim of body-shaming comments, she gives Lisa Vanderpump an ultimatum that will send reverberations throughout the SUR community.
125	4	"Lisa's Dilemma"	December 23, 2018	1.08
Katie's ultimatum forces Lisa Vanderpump to reconsider employing James at SUR, while Scheana tries to prove her loyalty to Katie, Kristen and Stassi by cutting ties with him. Tom Schwartz and Tom Sandoval differ in their methods of interviewing potential TomTom staff, Jax and Brittany host a dinner party to debut their beer cheese, and Lala resents having to return to the hostess stand after enjoying a glamorous life outside of SUR.
126	5	"Ice Queens"	January 7, 2019	1.30
Stassi and Ariana put their rivalry aside to throw an epic winter-themed birthday party, but Stassi's new boyfriend Beau gets his first taste of Stassi's famously bad birthday behavior. Jax confronts Tom Sandoval for questioning his engagement to Brittany, while Scheana finds herself attracted to her "best friend" Adam Spott. James Kennedy finds himself cut off from everyone at SUR, but Lisa vows not to give up on her former DJ.
127	6	"Love Thy Mother"	January 14, 2019	1.10
Stassi struggles to make amends with Beau after her birthday meltdown, while a newly sober James attempts to rekindle his friendship with Lala. Kristen celebrates the relaunch of her t-shirt line, Jax causes trouble at a SUR staff meeting, and the Toms present their cocktails to Lisa in hopes of getting them on the TomTom menu. Finally, when Katie, Kristen, and Stassi's mothers all come to town, the girls learn growing older doesn't always mean growing up.
128	7	"Girls' Night In"	January 21, 2019	1.26
Katie convinces Lisa to let her host a "Girls' Night In" party on James's former night, but Billie Lee lashes out at Katie for not including her in the planning. Brittany throws an unexpected tantrum, causing her friends to speculate she's stressed over her engagement to Jax. Lala decides James is moving too fast in rebuilding their friendship, and Stassi creates her own personal holiday: National Outfit of the Day Day.
129	8	"A Housewarming Divided"	January 28, 2019	1.35
The group journeys to Marina del Rey for Scheana's housewarming, where they learn Scheana and her "best friend" Adam have made their relationship physical, and Lala calls out Billie Lee. Ariana erupts on Tom for gossiping to the guys about her past romantic encounters with women, and Lisa Vanderpump finally reveals the fully finished TomTom to a giddy Sandoval and Schwartz.
130	9	"Tom and Tommer"	February 4, 2019	1.22
Lisa Vanderpump entrusts Sandoval and Schwartz with major responsibility as they scramble to get TomTom ready for its opening event, but Kristen is devastated when she learns she's not allowed to come. James erupts when Raquel considers attending "Girls' Night In," Lala advises Scheana not to overshare with Stassi, Katie and Kristen, and Jax celebrates his first birthday without of his parents.
131	10	"So Vain in Solvang"	February 11, 2019	1.15
Lala shows her girlfriends a glimpse of the good life when she takes them to Solvang on a private jet, but Kristen's mounting travel anxiety threatens to derail the trip. Jax looks forward to an epic boys' night with Sandoval and Schwartz, but first Brittany brings Jax to therapy to deal with his past infidelities. When James has an explosive fight with his mother over money, his mother reaches out to Lisa to employ a different Kennedy brother.
132	11	"Return of Crazy Kristen"	February 18, 2019	1.11
Kristen's bizarre vacation behavior threatens to spoil the girls' trip to wine country, while Scheana breaks down over the fact that she's no longer close with Stassi and Katie. Back in LA, James is overjoyed when he gets a last-minute invite to the guys' wild "staycation", and Jax fears he may revert to his bad boy ways when Tom Sandoval invites girls back to their hotel room.
133	12	"PJs on the PJ"	February 25, 2019	1.17
Stassi gives Kristen tough love about her relationship with Carter, while Sandoval and Schwartz worry that Lisa may not put their cocktails on the TomTom menu. When Lisa gives James permission to DJ an event at PUMP, he makes a play to regain his full-time job at SUR. Finally, upon returning home from the girls' trip, Lala faces a betrayal from her boyfriend that may end their three-year relationship.
134	13	"Reptilian Brain"	March 4, 2019	1.20
Stassi desperately wants to make a good impression when she first meets Beau's mom, but her hopes are dashed when Kristen and Carter cause a huge fight with Stassi and Katie in front of everyone. Sandoval and Ariana finally have an honest discussion about having kids, Jax dotes on Brittany after her dental surgery, and Lala dishes some dirt about the tawdry beginnings of her relationship with Randall.
135	14	"Tom vs. Tom"	March 11, 2019	1.17
The Toms plan a Puerto Vallarta vacation for their friends, but Katie explodes on Sandoval when she learns they have also invited James Kennedy. Kristen and Carter share an awkward dinner on their three-year anniversary, Lisa Vanderpump doles out some wisdom that might salvage a friendship and business partnership, and Tom and Tom are forced to confront James with some bad news.
136	15	"Trouble in Lala-land"	March 18, 2019	1.26
Still grieving over her father, Lala breaks down and lashes out at James, Raquel, and Billie Lee in front of customers at SUR. Lisa, Sandoval and Schwartz throw all their effort into preparing TomTom for the grand opening, while Jax complains about the mounting expense of his upcoming engagement party. James struggles to hold it together after being disinvited from Mexico, while Scheana hosts an enchilada night to reconnect with Stassi, Katie and Kristen.
137	16	"I Don't Like the Sound of Your Voice"	March 25, 2019	1.23
On the day of TomTom's official opening party, Sandoval surprises Schwartz with his grandest gesture yet, while Lisa confronts Lala about her behavior at Billie Lee's brunch. Katie sees the group's vacation to Mexico as a chance to reconnect with her busy husband, but ends up exploding when Schwartz takes a seat in first class without her. Still smarting from his exclusion from the trip, James makes a shocking revelation about his sobriety.
138	17	"FOMO in Mexico"	April 1, 2019	1.36
As the Mexico trip continues, Stassi unleashes her insecurities on Beau, while Ariana attempts to show Lala the error of her mean girl ways. Lisa oversees TomTom's first dinner service back in West Hollywood, while Schwartz and Sandoval celebrate their bar's big success from afar. A blissful Kristen finally conquers her travel anxiety, but her temper is tested when Jax dredges up old accusations against her.
139	18	"End of an Era"	April 8, 2019	1.46
On their final night in Mexico, Lala's decision to return to drinking leads to a public panic attack, while Schwartz finds a unique way to rekindle the romance with Katie. Stassi and Beau try to repair their relationship after their epic fight, while Kristen and Ariana take a step forward in their newfound friendship. Back in LA, Lisa contemplates firing a long time staff member, Raquel decides to throw a "puppy shower" to win some friends, and Billie Lee gets yelled at by Lisa for disrespecting her at work.
140	19	"The Exorcism of Stassi Schroeder"	April 15, 2019	1.31
Tom Schwartz finds a spectacular way to make good on his financial obligation to Lisa, while Stassi visits a real-life witch to exorcise the demons threatening her relationship with Beau. Lala stages a musical performance in honor of her father and comes to a realization about alcohol, James throws a fit when he learns he won’t be DJing Billie Lee's brunch, and Jax reveals some troubling issues during his and Brittany's couple's therapy.
141	20	"Brittany and the Beast"	April 22, 2019	1.33
Scheana goes out with a hot young model in an attempt to make Adam jealous, while James accuses Lala of being insincere in her attempt to save their friendship. Ariana vows to confront Lisa Vanderpump when she hears she has been criticizing Tom Sandoval's work ethic. When Brittany's big Kentucky family descends on West Hollywood in preparation for the engagement party, Jax puts his foot in his mouth during a tense conversation with her father.
142	21	"Rules of Engagement"	April 29, 2019	1.39
Jax and Brittany celebrate their engagement at an elaborate fairy-tale themed party, even as Brittany's father expresses doubts about his future son-in-law. Ariana confronts Lisa Vanderpump about not respecting Tom and Tom as business partners, while Brittany must inform Lala that she's excluded from her wedding party. Finally, the simmering tensions between Scheana and Adam boil over after Scheana reveals she's been with another guy.
143	22	"Reunion Part 1"	May 6, 2019	1.87
144	23	"Reunion Part 2"	May 13, 2019	1.34
145	24	"Reunion Part 3"	May 20, 2019	1.32

=== Season 8 (2020) ===
Beau Clark is promoted to a series regular. Max Boyens, Brett Caprioni and Dayna Kathan are introduced as series regulars.

No. overall	No. in season	Title	Original release date	US viewers (millions)
—	—	"How They Got Here 2019"	December 24, 2019	0.30
146	1	"There Goes the Neighborhood"	January 7, 2020	1.27
Jax, Brittany, Schwartz, Katie, Sandoval and Ariana all move into their very first "grown-up" houses, while Stassi struggles to rebuild her broken friendship with Kristen. Newly sober Lala confides in Lisa Vanderpump about her desire to make amends with an old friend, and TomTom general manager Max breaks the rules by dating the new hostess Dayna, much to his ex Scheana's dismay. Jax retaliates when Tom Sandoval skips one of his wedding events.
147	2	"Training Days"	January 14, 2020	1.05
Scheana claims she no longer has feelings for her ex Max, but when the new server Dayna starts dating him, Scheana makes Dayna's life at SUR very difficult. Stassi, Katie and Brittany grow frustrated with Kristen's refusal to cut ties with Carter, so Jax takes it upon himself to disinvite Carter from the bachelor/bachelorette trip to Miami. After an icy year of animosity, Lala and James finally find a way to put their differences aside, and Ariana opens up to Lisa Vanderpump about her struggles with depression.
148	3	"Next Level Rage Texts"	January 21, 2020	1.05
Stassi throws a book party at TomTom, but when Sandoval rage texts her for excluding him from the planning, it leads to an epic explosion between the two and forces Schwartz to pick sides between his two friends. Scheana bonds with new SUR server Charli over their mutual dislike for Dayna, while Dayna and Max's relationship continues to blossom. Finally, with Lisa Vanderpump away on a business trip, Schwartz must try to mend the rift in his friend group before everyone heads to Miami to celebrate Jax and Brittany.
149	4	"Don't Do It, Brittany"	January 28, 2020	1.19
When the group heads to Miami for a wild bachelor/bachelorette party weekend, Beau confronts Sandoval for attacking Stassi at her book signing. Meanwhile, Ariana accuses Schwartz of not pulling his weight at TomTom, and Brittany has a meltdown triggered by an unexpected reminder of Jax's infidelity. Back in Los Angeles, Lisa Vanderpump conducts her own investigation into what went wrong at TomTom, and Dayna turns to Lisa for advice on how to handle Scheana.
150	5	"Grumpy Old Men"	February 4, 2020	1.09
Jax and Brittany's dual bachelor/bachelorette trip charges on as Sandoval, Schwartz, Jax, and Beau plan a surprise disguise for the girls, while Stassi finds herself caught in the middle of a friendship-ending fight between Katie and Kristen. Back at SUR, Danica warns Dayna about Max's reputation as a womanizer, while Lisa Vanderpump must decide whether to allow volatile James Kennedy to DJ at TomTom for Gay Pride.
151	6	"Your Pride's Showing"	February 11, 2020	1.06
Schwartz and Sandoval gear up for TomTom's first Gay Pride celebration, but their decision to hire James as DJ backfires when he gets Raquel in trouble at SUR and Lisa suspects he is drinking again. Meanwhile, Dayna finally stands up to Scheana, Lisa helps Ariana come to terms with depression, Jax fumbles through the busiest day at SUR, and Scheana tries to convince everyone that she is not jealous of Dayna.
152	7	"It's Not About the Pastor"	February 18, 2020	1.05
Stassi, Katie, and Lala throw Brittany a princess-themed bridal shower, while James gets disinvited from Peter's birthday party. Lisa Vanderpump takes Raquel to task for walking out on her shift during Pride, and Dayna and Max decide to take the next step in their relationship. Finally, when a scandal erupts concerning Jax and Brittany's pastor, Sandoval and Ariana take a moral stance that threatens to tear the bridal parties apart and ruin their friendships forever.
153	8	"Ex-Best Man, Ex-Best Friend"	February 25, 2020	1.08
In the wake of their fight, Jax kicks Sandoval out of his wedding party and considers disinviting him from Kentucky completely. Meanwhile, Ariana pushes Lala and Stassi away as she spirals into a dark place, Scheana sabotages Brett and Charli's date, Brittany must figure out if Ariana is still her bridesmaid, and Lisa Vanderpump receives some devastating news.
154	9	"If You're Going to Drink, I Can't Stop You"	March 3, 2020	1.16
With the wedding in Kentucky days away, Jax must decide whether or not to forgive Tom Sandoval, while Ariana struggles to find the enthusiasm to attend her own birthday party. Katie and Kristen argue over whether Carter should attend the wedding, while Charli accuses Brett of being hung up on his ex. Finally, after James sends Raquel a string of hurtful text messages, Raquel gives James an ultimatum either to give up drinking or lose her forever.
155	10	"Jax's Last Hurrah"	March 10, 2020	1.07
On the eve of Jax and Brittany's wedding, the rehearsal dinner is disrupted when Stassi, Katie, and Lala clash with Kristen, and Jax spills a juicy secret about Katie and Schwartz's marriage. Meanwhile, back in Los Angeles, Lisa Vanderpump orchestrates a big surprise for the bride and groom, Dayna learns that Max may have cheated on her, and James and Max have a boys' night to commiserate over their girl troubles.
156	11	"Introducing Mr. and Mrs. Cauchi"	March 17, 2020	1.20
Jax and Brittany tie the knot in a lavish Kentucky ceremony surrounded by friends, while Stassi questions if Beau will ever propose to her at all. Lisa takes Katie and Schwartz to task for failing to make their marriage official, Sandoval throws himself into his best man duties to prove himself to Jax, and Kristen clashes with Carter over the future of their relationship. Back at SUR, Danica tries to talk Dayna out of giving Max another chance.
157	12	"All Daugs Go to Heaven"	March 24, 2020	1.22
Tom Sandoval throws an "extra" themed birthday party to encourage his friends to be their best selves, while Stassi and Katie learn they must work with Kristen even though their friendship has ended. Max tries to ban Danica from TomTom for meddling in his relationship, Lisa reconnects with James in the wake of his new sobriety, and Lala's attempt to make amends with Raquel doesn't go as planned. Tom Schwartz hosts an unusual memorial for his dead lizard, Daug.
158	13	"Prank Wars"	March 31, 2020	1.16
Brett insults Scheana while interviewing her for his YouTube channel, while Katie hosts a girls' night complete with wine, cheese, and a guest list that doesn't include Kristen. Raquel stands up for her boyfriend James when Lala questions his sobriety, and Lisa travels home to England to attend her mother's funeral. Finally, Tom Sandoval and Max toilet paper Jax's house in honor of his 40th birthday, but their actions spark the beginning of an epic prank battle that threatens to derail Schwartz and Katie's relationship.
159	14	"Shame Hangover"	April 7, 2020	1.23
Schwartz makes amends with Katie after their blowout fight, while Beau opens up to them about his plans to propose to Stassi. Lisa reprimands Danica about improving her attitude, Kristen learns she isn't invited to Las Vegas for Schwartz and Katie's second wedding, and Brett sets his sights on a newly single Dayna, despite Scheana's emotional objections.
160	15	"Mr. & Mrs. Schwartz, Take Two"	April 14, 2020	1.26
The group travels to Las Vegas to celebrate Schwartz and Katie's second wedding, but leave a heartbroken Kristen behind. Lisa shows off the Vanderpump Cocktail Garden, Beau calls Stassi's father to ask permission to propose, Schwartz finds a bra in his bag that doesn't belong to Katie, and Max sets his sights on a cocktail waitress who looks eerily similar to Scheana. Meanwhile, back in Los Angeles, Dayna and Brett grow closer during a double date with James and Raquel.
161	16	"Witches of Weho Whine"	April 21, 2020	1.27
Lisa helps Beau plan a secret engagement party for Stassi, but Stassi's insecurities threaten everything when she explodes on Kristen at a wine event. Meanwhile, Lala and James make music together and bond over their sobriety struggles, Danica takes Brett to task for dating his friend's ex, and Scheana presents Dayna with an unwanted gift.
162	17	"Til Death Do Us Not Part"	April 28, 2020	1.35
Beau stuns Stassi with a quirky but romantic engagement proposal, and when Lisa hosts an elaborate party to celebrate the happy couple, Jax and Brittany comfort Kristen when she's left out of the festivities. Finally, Danica and the SUR staff go head to head with Sandoval, Schwartz, and the team from TomTom during an epic softball game to determine restaurant dominance, ending with James giving Katie the apology she's always wanted.
163	18	"Mercury's in Gatorade"	May 5, 2020	1.16
Stassi and Beau revel in their post-engagement bliss, while Scheana enlists Brett to a shoot a sexy video. Brittany must again answer for Jax's bad behavior when he lashes out at Max, and Raquel tries to persuade Lisa to give James one last chance. Finally, when Kristen refuses to admit she made a sex tape with someone other than Carter, Jax begins to spiral out of control and no one is safe from his wrath.
164	19	"A Tale of Two Pool Parties"	May 12, 2020	1.32
Tom Sandoval throws a competing pool party on the same day as Jax, forcing everyone to choose sides once and for all. Brittany blames Katie for the rift in their friendship, while Max and Brett nearly come to blows over their feelings for Dayna. Schwartz and Sandoval must decide whether to double down on their investment with Lisa, James makes a surprising ally, and Ariana erupts when Kristen tells her that Stassi has been making fun of her house.
165	20	"Unfriended"	May 19, 2020	1.34
Lisa Vanderpump throws a party to celebrate TomTom's one-year anniversary, but relationships are tested when Kristen confronts Katie and Stassi for abandoning her, and Jax and Sandoval face off over the future of their friendship. Meanwhile, Dayna calls out Max's womanizing ways, Brett confronts Scheana for stirring the pot, and Danica gets into a physical altercation. After years of hostility, Lala arranges for James and Randall to have a man-to-man talk.
166	21	"Secrets Revealed"	May 26, 2020	0.91
167	22	"Reunion Part 1"	June 2, 2020	1.07
168	23	"Reunion Part 2"	June 9, 2020	1.19
169	24	"Reunion Part 3"	June 16, 2020	1.05

=== Season 9 (2021–22) ===
Doute, Schroeder, Taylor, Cartwright, Boyens, Caprioni, Clark and Kathan departed as series regulars. Charli Burnett and Raquel Leviss are promoted to series regulars. Brock Davies is introduced as a series regular.

No. overall	No. in season	Title	Original release date	US viewers (millions)
—	—	"How They Got Here 2021"	September 21, 2021	0.24
170	1	"We're Back Baby"	September 28, 2021	0.64
171	2	"The Schwartz Shuffle"	October 5, 2021	0.63
172	3	"Welcome to Rachella!"	October 12, 2021	0.61
173	4	"Palm Springs and Tiffany Rings"	October 19, 2021	0.58
174	5	"Drink the Tea, Spill the Tea"	October 26, 2021	0.55
175	6	"Poker Faces"	November 2, 2021	0.60
176	7	"Anger Mismanagement"	November 9, 2021	0.61
177	8	"Pitch Not-So-Perfect"	November 16, 2021	0.64
178	9	"It's a Mad, Mad Pool Party"	November 30, 2021	0.68
179	10	"Sexy Unique Feet"	December 7, 2021	0.65
180	11	"Best Friends for Never"	December 14, 2021	0.72
181	12	"Give Them Lala"	December 28, 2021	0.70
182	13	"Unprogress Party"	January 4, 2022	0.66
183	14	"Between a Brock and a Hard Place"	January 11, 2022	0.70
184	15	"Engagement Party Crashers"	January 18, 2022	0.78
185	16	"Reunion Part 1"	January 25, 2022	0.88
186	17	"Reunion Part 2"	January 26, 2022	0.86

=== Season 10 (2023) ===
Burnett and Davies departed as series regulars, whilst Burnett served in a recurring capacity. Kristina Kelly and Ally Lewber served in recurring capacities.

No. overall	No. in season	Title	Original release date	US viewers (millions)
—	—	"How They Got Here 2023"	February 1, 2023	0.22
187	1	"Breaking Bubbas"	February 8, 2023	0.84
188	2	"Was It Worth It?"	February 15, 2023	0.73
189	3	"Troll Mates"	February 22, 2023	0.66
190	4	"No Home Left to Wreck"	March 1, 2023	0.64
191	5	"Lovestruck at the Discopussy"	March 8, 2023	0.87
192	6	"Divorce Party Crashers"	March 15, 2023	1.07
193	7	"Galaxy Gaslighting"	March 22, 2023	1.05
194	8	"By Invitation Only"	March 29, 2023	1.17
195	9	"Forbidden Fruit"	April 5, 2023	1.14
196	10	"It's All Happening ... Again"	April 12, 2023	1.12
197	11	"Mistress in Distress"	April 19, 2023	1.17
198	12	"Beach, Don't Kill My Vibe"	April 26, 2023	1.16
199	13	"Lady and the Glamp"	May 3, 2023	1.41
200	14	"There's Something About Her"	May 10, 2023	1.44
201	15	"#Scandoval"	May 17, 2023	1.89
202	16	"Reunion Part 1"	May 24, 2023	2.04
203	17	"Reunion Part 2"	May 31, 2023	1.87
204	18	"Reunion Part 3"	June 7, 2023	2.00
205	19	"Secrets Revealed"	June 14, 2023	1.13

=== Season 11 (2024) ===
Leviss departed as a series regular. Brock Davies and Ally Lewber served in recurring capacities.

No. overall	No. in season	Title	Original release date	US viewers (millions)
—	—	"A Decade of Rumors and Lies"	December 12, 2023	0.34
206	1	"Notes on a Scandal"	January 30, 2024	1.39
207	2	"The Ultimate Betrayal"	February 6, 2024	1.09
208	3	"You're Not the Queen of the Group"	February 13, 2024	0.96
209	4	"Dog Days of Summer"	February 20, 2024	0.97
210	5	"Lake It or Break It"	February 27, 2024	0.93
211	6	"Saw It on the Graham"	March 5, 2024	0.93
212	7	"Written in the Stars"	March 12, 2024	0.93
213	8	"Peaks and Valleys"	March 19, 2024	0.99
214	9	"Kiss Kiss, Revenge Bang"	March 26, 2024	0.96
215	10	"Line in the Sand"	April 2, 2024	0.95
216	11	"May the Best Woman Win"	April 9, 2024	0.98
217	12	"How'd You Like Them Apples?"	April 16, 2024	0.92
218	13	"Jax Attack"	April 23, 2024	0.92
219	14	"For Old Tom's Sake"	April 30, 2024	0.86
220	15	"Plot Twist"	May 7, 2024	1.02
221	16	"Reunion Part 1"	May 14, 2024	1.02
222	17	"Reunion Part 2"	May 21, 2024	0.99
223	18	"Reunion Part 3"	May 28, 2024	1.05
224	19	"Secrets Revealed"	May 29, 2024 (Note: Season 11, Episode 19 was released exclusively on Peacock and did not air on Bravo.)	N/A

=== Season 12 (2025–26) ===
Shay, Maloney, Sandoval, Schwartz, Madix, Kennedy and Kent departed as series regulars. Venus Binkley, Jason Cohen, Shayne Davis, Chris Hahn, Angelica Jensen, Marcus Johnson, Audrey Lingle, Natalie Maguire, Demy Selem and Kim Suarez are introduced as series regulars.

No. overall	No. in season	Title	Original release date	US viewers (millions)
—	—	"Vanderpump Rules: Raise Your Glass to 11 Seasons"	November 25, 2025	N/A
225	1	"Sur-ving Drama"	December 2, 2025	0.30
226	2	"Manifest and Chill"	December 9, 2025	0.24
227	3	"Crash Out Queens"	December 16, 2025	0.20
228	4	"Pour Decisions"	December 30, 2025	0.17
229	5	"Seeing Red (Flags)"	January 6, 2026	0.19
230	6	"Pump Fiction"	January 13, 2026	0.20
231	7	"Paso Aggressive"	January 20, 2026	0.22
232	8	"Speakerphone Suckerpunch"	January 27, 2026	0.25
233	9	"Rosé All Day"	February 3, 2026	0.24
234	10	"Threesome's a Crowd"	February 10, 2026	0.23
235	11	"Back Alley Betrayals"	February 17, 2026	0.23
236	12	"Pride and Joy"	February 24, 2026	0.21
237	13	"Reunion Part 1"	March 3, 2026	0.27
238	14	"Reunion Part 2"	March 10, 2026	0.23
