= Vanderpump =

Vanderpump may refer to:

- Lisa Vanderpump, British television personality (born 1960)
  - Vanderpump Rules, American reality television series (2013–present)
  - Vanderpump Rules After Show, American reality talk show (2015–2016)
  - Vanderpump Rules: Jax & Brittany Take Kentucky, American reality television series (2017)
  - Overserved with Lisa Vanderpump, American reality television series (2021)
  - Vanderpump Dogs, American reality television series (2021)
