= Tom Sandoval =

American reality television personality

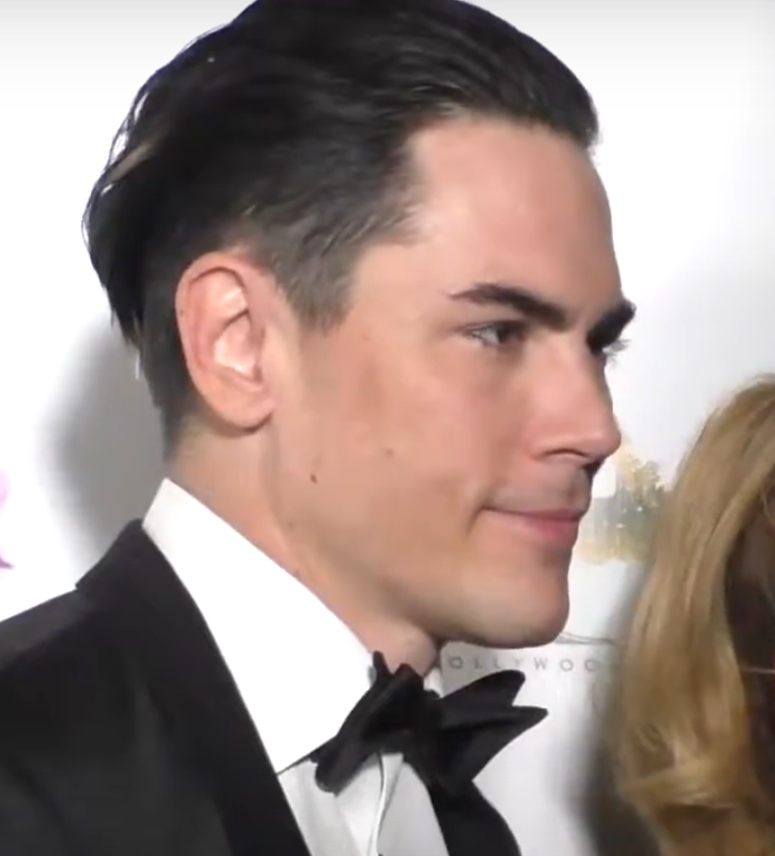
- Sandoval in 2016
- Born: Thomas Anthony Sandoval; July 7, 1982 (age 44); St. Louis, Missouri, U.S.
- Occupations: Television personality; actor; musician; restaurateur; businessman
- Years active: 1998–present
- Television: Vanderpump Rules, The Traitors

Thomas Anthony Sandoval (born July 7, 1983) is an American television personality, restaurateur and musician. He was a cast member on Bravo's reality television series Vanderpump Rules and the third season of Peacock's The Traitors.

== Early Life ==
Thomas Anthony Sandoval was born in St. Louis, Missouri to his mother, Terri Green, and his father, Anthony "Tony". His parents divorced when he was young. He has a brother, Brian.

He grew up in Florissant, Missouri and went to school at St. Ferdinand Catholic School, Russell High School, and eventually Hazelwood West High School, where he graduated.

Sandoval originally moved to New York City and was homeless for a bit, before moving to Los Angeles, California.

== Career ==
Sandoval appears as Jack in the 2002 music video for "Misunderstood" by Bon Jovi, and reprised his role as Jack in the 2003 video for Bon Jovi's "All About Lovin' You". From 2013 to 2024, Sandoval was a main cast member on Bravo's reality television series Vanderpump Rules. He was a former bartender, having previously worked at Villa Blanca before moving to SUR Restaurant & Lounge, two West Hollywood eateries co-owned by Lisa Vanderpump and her husband Ken Todd.

In August 2018, Sandoval opened a restaurant that he co-founded named "Tom Tom" with friend (also Vanderpump Rules co-star) Tom Schwartz, (Vanderpump Rules producers) Lisa Vanderpump and Ken Todd. Both Schwartz and Sandoval invested $50,000 each for a five percent stake in the restaurant.

Sandoval is a co-author of the mixology book, Fancy AF Cocktails: Drink Recipes from a Couple of Professional Drinkers, written with Ariana Madix and Danny Pellegrino. The book was published by Houghton Mifflin Harcourt in 2019. In December 2020, the trio were faced with a lawsuit filed by author Alison Baker over an alleged breach of contract. The lawsuit was settled in May 2022.

In 2023, Sandoval competed in season ten of The Masked Singer as "Diver". He was eliminated on "NFL Night". In 2025 he appeared on season three of the U.S. version of The Traitors.

In 2025, Sandoval auditioned on the twentieth season of America's Got Talent with his band, Tom Sandoval and the Most Extras. They received four yeses from judges (Simon Cowell, Sofía Vergara, Mel B, and Howie Mandel). The group made it to the live shows, but was eliminated in the first week after being buzzed by Cowell who stated the performance "did not sound good."

Sandoval was cast in the third season of the reality competition show House of Villains, which premiered in February 2026.

== Personal life ==
Sandoval was in a relationship with SUR co-worker/Vanderpump Rules co-star Kristen Doute from 2007 to 2013. Sandoval was in a relationship with Ariana Madix from 2014 to 2023. Sandoval and Madix very publicly separated after she discovered that he had been cheating on her with her friend and Vanderpump Rules co-star Rachel "Raquel" Leviss. The shocking breakup was dubbed "Scandoval" by the media.

From February 2024 to mid-2026, he was in a relationship with model Victoria Lee Robinson.

Sandoval and Robinson supported Spencer Pratt in his Los Angeles mayoral run.

=== Controversies ===
While dating Doute, Sandoval allegedly cheated on her with Madix. Both denied the rumors, until Sandoval told friend and co-star Stassi Schroeder that they kissed at the Golden Nugget Casino in Las Vegas, Nevada, three years before season 2 and before he and Doute were together. Doute herself was cheating on Sandoval with costar Jax Taylor, who was Sandoval's best friend.

In 2023, Sandoval and Madix very publicly separated after she discovered that he had been cheating on her with her friend and Vanderpump Rules co-star Rachel "Raquel" Leviss. The shocking breakup was dubbed "Scandoval" by the media.

On June 3, 2026, Sandoval and Robinson got into a domestic violent fight that was captured on CCTV in Robinson's Los Angeles home. In the CCTV footage, Sandoval is seen pushing her father into a fire pit after verbally arguing with both father and daughter. After getting up, Will charged at Sandoval, who ran into the house. Sandoval claimed that after he ran, Will and Victoria both verbally and physically abused him.

Robinson was arrested for corporal injury to a spouse or cohabitant. Sandoval filed a restraining order against her and her father, J. Will Robinson, who Sandoval claimed also attacked him. Will filed his own restraining order against Sandoval for civil harassment.

== Filmography ==
=== Music videos ===
Year	Song	Artist	Role	Notes
2002	"Misunderstood"	Bon Jovi	Jack	Uncredited
2003	"All About Lovin' You"	Bon Jovi	Jack	

=== As himself ===
Year	Title	Notes
2006	The Hills	1 episode; uncredited
2011	Film Fiend	1 episode
2012–2014	The Real Housewives of Beverly Hills	6 episodes
2013–2024	Vanderpump Rules	173 episodes
2013	2 Miles in 20 Minutes	Short
2015–2023	Watch What Happens Live! with Andy Cohen	17 episodes
2015	The Playboy Morning Show	1 episode
2016	Bravo After Hours with Carrie Keagan	1 episode
2016	E! News Daily	1 episode
2017	Vanderpump Rules After Show	1 episode
2018	Hollywood Medium	1 episode
2018	Poker Night Live	1 episode
2019	Vanderpumped	
2019	Celebrity Page	1 episode
2019	Celebrity Family Feud	2 episodes
2019	Migz interviews Tom Sandoval & Tom Schwartz	Video
2019	National Film & Television Awards USA	TV Special
2019	GMA Day	1 episode
2019–2022	1st Look	2 episodes
2020	The Morning Show	1 episode
2020	Click Bait with Batchelor Nation	1 episode
2020–2021	The Kelly Clarkson Show	2 episodes
2021	For Real: The Story of Reality TV	1 episode
2021	Migz Across America: The Idea	
2022	Nick Cannon	1 episode
2022	2022 MTV Movie & TV Awards: Unscripted	TV Special
2022	Winter House	2 episodes
2022–2023	Entertainment Tonight	2 episodes
2023	Dish Nation	2 episodes
2023	Extra	1 episode
2023	Special Forces: World's Toughest Test	8 episodes
2023	The Masked Singer	Season 10, 2 episodes (as ‘Diver’)
2025	The Traitors	Season 3
2025	America’s Got Talent	Season 20
2026	House of Villains	Season 3

=== Film and television ===
Year	Title	Role	Notes
2008	Playing with Fire	Miles	
2008	Reflection	Darien	Short
2009	Alien Presence	Doug	
2009	The Pit and the Pendulum	Vinnie	
2010	Puppet Master: Axis of Evil	Ben / Max	Video
2011	Behind Your Eyes	Steven Carlyle	
2012	23 Minutes to Sunrise	Donald	
2014	Tango Amargo	Javi	Short
2015	Social Status	Zach	1 episode
2016	The Raiven Destiny	Staka	Short
2019	The Other Two	Tom Sandoval	1 episode
2019	Dying for a Baby	Dave	TV Movie
2021	Killer in the Attic	Connor	TV Movie
2021	Scare Us	Peter Metus	
2022	Bee and PuppyCat	Crispin Wizard (voice)	Main role
2026	Home Makeover Nightmare	Billy	TV Movie

== See also ==
- Schwartz & Sandy's
- Tom Tom (restaurant)
