= Ariana Madix =

American television personality, businesswoman and model (born in 1985)

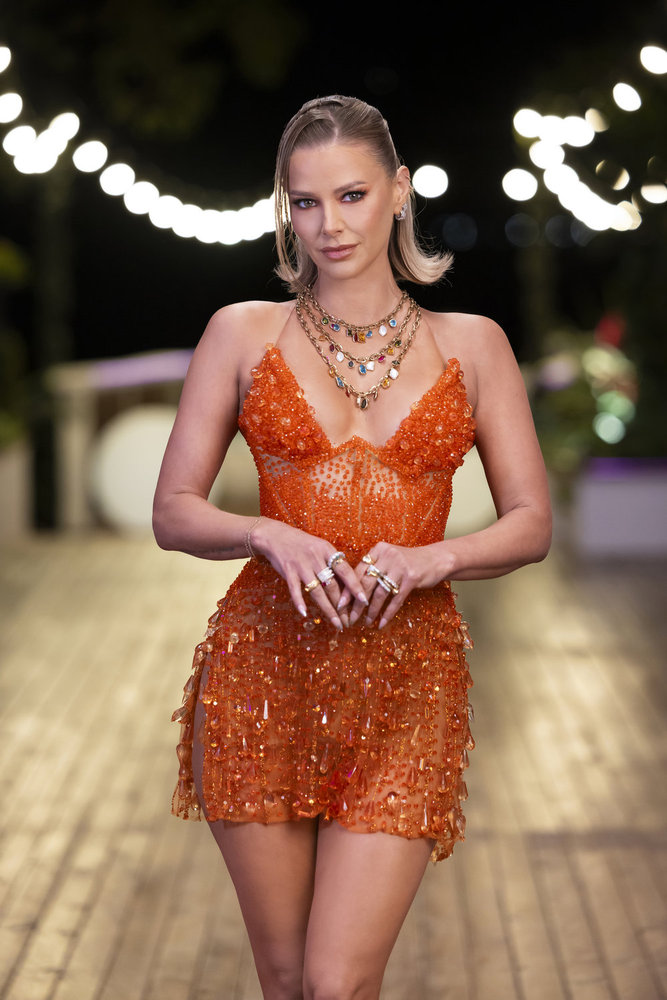
- Madix in July 2025
- Born: June 24, 1985 (age 41); Melbourne, Florida, U.S.
- Education: Flagler College
- Occupations: Television personality; presenter; actress; businesswoman
- Years active: 2008–present
- Television: Vanderpump Rules; Love Island USA
- Partner: Daniel Wai (2023–present)

Ariana Madix (born June 24, 1985) is an American media personality, television presenter, actress, and businesswoman. She first gained recognition as a cast member on the Bravo reality program Vanderpump Rules (2013–2024). Her cocktail book, Single AF Cocktails, was released on December 5, 2023, and became a New York Times best seller.

After filming season eleven of Vanderpump Rules, Madix competed on the thirty-second season of ABC's Dancing with the Stars; she and professional partner Pasha Pashkov finished in third place. She made her Broadway debut as Roxie Hart in the musical Chicago (2024) and is the host of the Peacock dating series Love Island USA (2024–present), where she earned a nomination for the Primetime Emmy Award for Outstanding Host for a Reality or Reality Competition Program.

== Early life and education ==
Madix was born on June 24, 1985, in Melbourne, Florida, and raised by her father, James, and mother, Tanya. She lived with both of her parents as well as her younger brother, Jeremy Madix. James is of Irish descent. In a Glamour interview, Madix said: "My dad would not come home. He's no longer with us and I love him and feel like he was going through some stuff and doing his best in a lot of ways, but he would have a tendency to be done with work and be at the dive bar as opposed to helping us with our homework. And my mom did everything." In therapy, she realized that overachieving was a coping mechanism, saying "If I'm perfect, then he'll want to be there."

She began riding horses at age six and had a competitive equestrian career. She also won two national dance championships. She graduated from Eau Gallie High School in 2003. In 2007, she graduated from Flagler College, where she received a dual bachelor's degree in theatre and broadcast communications. She worked as costumed characters such as Ariel, Cinderella and Aurora (Sleeping Beauty) at Disney World while she was studying in college. After college, she moved to New York City with a dream to "be on Broadway." She stayed for five years and worked as a bartender and hostess at restaurant Butter.

== Career ==
=== 2008–2023: Career beginnings and Vanderpump Rules ===
Early in her career, she was frequently cast in videos for comedy website CollegeHumor. Madix struggled to get television roles in New York City, so she decided to move to Los Angeles, saying: "I was doing acting stuff, but I couldn't push past whatever [I needed to] because I didn't have legitimate television credits or anything to be able to move into the next level." She started working at Lisa Vanderpump's restaurants SUR and Villa Blanca, which earned her a spot on the reality television series Vanderpump Rules in 2013, following the lives of the SUR, PUMP, and Villa Blanca servers. She appeared on Vanderpump Rules for eleven seasons, until it was announced that the show's twelfth season would feature a new cast.

She had guest roles on several television series, including Fox's live-action sitcom Dads and FX's sitcom Anger Management. She also appeared in films Working It Out (2010), Killer Eye: Halloween Haunt (2011), Attack of the 50 Foot Cheerleader (2012), Dirty Dealing 3D (2018) and Dead End (2019). In 2019, she appeared as herself in the comedy television series The Other Two, in the episode "Chase Shoots a Music Video". On December 3, 2019, Madix and Tom Sandoval released their cocktail book Fancy AF Cocktails: Drink Recipes from a Couple of Professional Drinkers by Houghton Mifflin Harcourt.

In March 2023, Madix began filming Lifetime film Buying Back My Daughter (2023) in Vancouver. She plays a police officer Karen, investigating a sex trafficking case. The film is part of the messaging of the network's "Stop Violence Against Women" campaign. On June 7, 2023, People published first photos of Madix as Karen on Buying Back My Daughter. For her role on Vanderpump Rules, Madix and her co-stars Scheana Shay, Katie Maloney and Lala Kent won the "Best Reality On-Screen Team" award at the 2023 MTV Movie & TV Awards. On July 7, 2023, Dancing with the Stars judge Derek Hough announced on Good Morning America that Madix would appear on season 32 of ABC's dance competition series Dancing with the Stars. Madix and her dance partner Pasha Pashkov finished in third place. On July 11, 2023, streaming service Peacock announced that Madix would make a special guest appearance on the fifth season of Love Island. She headed to Fiji to surprise the new cast of ten singles during week two of the show, which aired daily starting July 18, 2023. In November 2023, she was a special guest host in three episodes on the first season of Love Island Games.

Her second cocktailbook, Single AF Cocktails, was released on December 5, 2023 by Clarkson Potter, an imprint of the Crown Publishing Group. The book debuted at 10 on The New York Times advice, how-to & miscellaneous best seller list for the week ending December 24, 2023.

=== 2024–present: Broadway theatre and television hosting ===
On December 6, 2023, Madix announced that she will make her Broadway debut in the role of Roxie Hart in the musical Chicago. She played the role for eight weeks starting on January 29, 2024. Broadway theatre has been a long-time goal for Madix, saying: "It's just the biggest dream come true. I cannot believe this is real life. I'm going to cry." BroadwayWorld reported that Madix's debut week had its highest grossing non-holiday performance week in the show's history. The ongoing production of Chicago is Broadway's second longest-running American musical in history, which has run for 27 years. It trails only Phantom of the Opera, which ran for 35 years. The production grossed $939,177.40 for the week ending February 4, 2024. Her Broadway run was extended from March 24, 2024 to April 7, 2024 due to popular demand.

Her Broadway performance received positive reviews, Refinery29 wrote: "Now, I am no theater critic, but if I were, I'd give Madix five stars. She hit her notes, danced her steps, and nailed her jokes. Her physical comedy was spectacular, her chemistry was palpable, and her stage presence was magnetic." People magazine reported that Madix "gave a killer performance with the polish and skill of a Broadway veteran. She received standing ovations by curtain's close and smiled brightly for the crowd as she took her bows."

Madix replaced actress Sarah Hyland as host for the sixth season of the dating reality series Love Island. On May 6, 2024, it was announced that Madix would be reprising the role of Roxie Hart once again in the musical Chicago. Her second Broadway run spanned August 1 through September 1, 2024. She was a host at Live From E!: Emmy After Party with NeNe Leakes and Justin Sylvester on September 15, 2024. In October 2024, Variety announced that Madix has a guest role in the third season of ABC's police procedural television series Will Trent. In the episode, she plays a fictionalized version of herself and helps to stage an intervention for a friend. In August 2025, Deadline announced that she landed a guest role as Dr. Emerson on the second season of NBC's sitcom St. Denis Medical.

== Dancing with the Stars performances ==
Average: 26.6

Week #	Dance / Song	Judges' scores					Result
Week #	Dance / Song	Inaba	Hough	Guest	Tonioli	Total	Result
1	Tango / "Love Myself (Riddler Remix)"	7	7	—N/a	7	21	Safe
2	Samba / "Me Porto Bonito"	6	7	—N/a	7	20	Safe
3	Quickstep / "You Can't Hurry Love"	9	8	9	8	34	Safe
4	Contemporary / "Into the Unknown"	8	9	—N/a	8	25	Safe
5	Viennese waltz / "Happier Than Ever"	8	8	8	8	32	Safe
6	Argentine tango / "Bad Guy"	9	9	9	10	37	Safe
7	Cha-cha-cha / "I'm a Slave 4 U"; Team Freestyle / "Everybody (Backstreet's Back)"	9; 9	9; 9	10; 10	9; 9	37; 37	Safe
8	Paso doble / "Queen of the Night"	9	10	10	10	39	Safe
9	Rumba / "Cruel Summer"	9	9	9	10	37	Safe
10	Jive / "Runaway Baby"; Foxtrot / "Trampoline"	9; 10	9; 10	—N/a	10; 10	28; 30	No elimination
11	Samba / "Spice Up Your Life"; Freestyle / "Run the World (Girls)" & "Level Up"	9; 10	10; 10	—N/a	10; 10	29; 30	3rd place

== Business ventures ==
In November 2017, she released a holiday lip kit, "Ariana Nudist Lip Set" with Frankie Rose Cosmetics, consisting of three nude-colored lipsticks. On July 21, 2023, Madix announced a lipstick collaboration with Lip Lab, consisting of four lipsticks. She worked with color experts and the collection is inspired by her life, interests and ideals she stands for. On April 12, 2024, Madix released an exclusive shoe collection, "The Ariana Madix Collection" with Designer Shoe Warehouse. The collection includes her favorite styles from DSW, but does not include shoes designed by Madix.

List of product lines by Ariana Madix
Year	Title	Brand	Notes
2017	"Ariana Nudist Lip Set"	Frankie Rose Cosmetics	Lipstick collection
2023	"Ariana Madix x Lip Lab"	Lip Lab	Lipstick collection
2024	"The Ariana Madix Collection"	DSW	

=== Sandwich shop ===
In 2022, Madix and her Vanderpump Rules co-star Katie Maloney announced plans to open a sandwich shop and wine bar called Something About Her. In November 2023, Something About Her teamed up with Lay's chips to release an exclusive flavor called Lay's Grilled Cheese & Tomato Soup. The sandwich shop opening faced numerous setbacks and delays. On May 22, 2024, the Something About Her sandwich shop officially opened to the public with their grand opening. The restaurant opened in high demand and guests queued for up to three hours on the opening day. Something About Her received positive reviews upon opening.

Product lines by Something About Her
Year	Title	Brand	Notes
2023	"Something About Her x Hippy Feet Socks"	Hippy Feet Socks	Sock collaboration
2023	"Lay’s Grilled Cheese & Tomato Soup"	Lay's	Exclusive flavor

== Public image ==
In March 2023, Madix became a subject of widespread media attention, after her partner of almost 10 years, Tom Sandoval, was caught having a months-long affair with Madix's best friend and Vanderpump Rules co-star Raquel Leviss. Madix has successfully parlayed her media fame into numerous business endeavors. After the breakup, Madix appeared on the Today show, Call Her Daddy podcast, The New York Times newspaper and on the cover of the June 2023 issue of Glamour. Madix has partnered with numerous brands to create sponsored online content such as Bic, Uber 1, Fernanda Cosmetics, Lay's, Bloomingdale's, SoFi, Duracell, T-Mobile and Nutrafol.

Madix wore a red cut-out Mônot dress at the Vanderpump Rules season 10 reunion that left her torso nearly fully exposed apart from bands across her chest and waist. The garment instantly received significant media coverage and the dress was discussed by those in the fashion and entertainment industry for weeks. The dress was dubbed "The Revenge Dress" by the media. On May 26, 2023, in an interview with Madix's stylist, Emily Men, Rolling Stone noted that "Madix has been serving standout looks" since the scandal and her "outfits have garnered a lot of attention and praise." Grazia magazine wrote: "Ariana Madix showed up in a look that redefines the term 'revenge dress.' (Remember, the whole phrase started when Princess Diana wore the off-the-shoulder LBD by Christina Stambolian at the time when Prince Charles' affair was being exposed, which ushered in her post-divorce era style.)" Insider wrote: "Pictures of her quickly went viral on social media, with many hailing Madix as the new queen of revenge dressing."

In October 2023, Madix was placed at number one on Us Weekly's "Top 10 Reality Stars of the Year" list, and appeared on the magazine cover with an accompanying interview. She was also one of the women included on Variety's "40 Most Powerful Women on Reality TV in 2023" list, with the magazine writing: "Madix emerged from the #Scandoval a hero, and has managed to turn the unwanted exposure into incalculable brand deals, an appearance at the White House Correspondents Dinner and a turn on Dancing With the Stars." Madix was one of the celebrities on People's 2023 25 Most Intriguing People of the Year list.

== Personal life ==
In a 2023 interview with Us Weekly, Madix revealed that in the future she would like to own a home, be on Broadway, and be the host of a dating show. She had accomplished all of the three goals by March 2024, when she became the host of Love Island, made her Broadway debut, and bought a home.

=== Relationships ===
Madix was in a relationship with Tom Sandoval from 2014 to 2023. Madix separated publicly from Sandoval after it was revealed that he had cheated on Madix with her friend and co-star Raquel (now Rachel) Leviss for seven months. The break-up and its aftermath were referred to as "Scandoval".

As of June 2023, Madix was dating New York City-based fitness coach Daniel Wai. The pair met at a mutual friend's wedding in Mexico and maintain a long distance relationship as Madix lives in Los Angeles and Wai in New York City.

In 2020, Madix came out as bisexual.

=== Health ===
In 2018, she had surgery to remove a tumor after being diagnosed with skin cancer. She became an ambassador for The Skin Cancer Foundation and Madix uses her public platform to advocate and bring awareness to skin cancer. She discussed the foundation's services in an episode of E!'s Daily Pop.

In February 2022, Madix revealed that she had been struggling with an eating disorder when she joined Vanderpump Rules but has recovered since.

== Filmography ==
Film
Year	Title	Role	Notes
2008	Swing Vote: What Side Are You On?	Jackie	Short film
2010	Working It Out	Bar girl #1	
2011	Killer Eye: Halloween Haunt	Catalina	
2012	The Dead Want Women	Danni	
2012	Reparations	Hope	Short film
2012	Attack of the 50 Foot Cheerleader	Pledge #2	
2018	Dirty Dealing	Raine	
2019	Dead End	Amanda	
2025	City of Demons	Danni	
2026	Hexed †	TBA	Voice

Television
Year	Title	Role	Notes
2009	The CollegeHumor Show	Lexi Meyers	Episode: "The Morning After"
2009	NFL Writers Room	Ariana	2 episodes
2009–15	CollegeHumor Originals	Hot girl / Alexis / Lexi	10 episodes
2011	Tilt-A-World	Ruby	6 episodes
2011	LoveFinder	Amanda	Television film
2012–14	The Real Housewives of Beverly Hills	Herself	3 episodes; Uncredited
2013	Single Siblings	Hot burping girl	Episode: "More Than Facebook Friends?"
2013	Dads	Female employee	Episode: "My Dad's Hotter Than Your Dad"
2013–2024	Vanderpump Rules	Herself	Series regular; 208 episodes
2014	Anger Management	Melanie	Episode: "Charlie's Living the Dream"
2016	Adam Ruins Everything	Herself	Episode: "Adam Ruins Hollywood"
2016	Lonely and Horny	Brianne	Episode: "Threesome"
2018	Waking Up With Strangers	Chloe Shrager	Episodes: "Legend" and "Pretty in Pink"
2019	Celebrity Family Feud	Herself	Contestant; 2 episodes
2019	The Other Two	Ariana Madix	Episode: "Chase Shoots a Music Video"
2021	Paradise City	Bobbi	Episode: "The Man of the Hour"
2023	Buying Back My Daughter	Officer Karen	Lifetime television film
2023	Dancing with the Stars	Herself	Contestant on season 32; 3rd place
2023–present	Love Island USA	Herself	Special guest on season 5; 2 episodes Host on seasons 6–8; 36 episodes
2023–present	Love Island Games	Herself	Special guest host on season 1; 3 episodes Host on season 2; 15 episodes
2024	Live From E!: Emmy After Party	Herself	Host; Television special
2024	The 2024 Primetime Creative Arts Emmy Awards	Herself	Presenter; Television special
2025	Will Trent	Herself	Episode: "Abigail B."
2025	Love Island: Beyond the Villa	Herself	Episode: "A Bombshell Has Entered Los Angeles"
2025	St. Denis Medical	Dr. Emerson	
2025	The Voice	Co-host	Finale preshow; Season 28

Theatre
Year	Title	Role	Venue	Notes
2024	Chicago	Roxie Hart	Ambassador Theatre	Runtime: January 29, 2024 – April 7, 2024
2024	Chicago	Roxie Hart	Ambassador Theatre	Runtime: August 1 − September 1, 2024
2026	Just in Time	Connie Francis	Circle in the Square Theatre	Runtime: September 12, 2026 - November 22, 2026

Music videos
Year	Title	Artist	Role
2015	"T.I.P."	Charles McMansion	Girl at Library
2021	"Oops!"	Yung Gravy	Tracy

Podcasts
Year	Title	Role	Notes
2022	Earth To Ariana	Host	21 episodes

Other credits
Year	Title	Role	Notes
2012	Late Lunch	Animal trainer	Short film
2016	The Raiven Destiny	Associate producer	Short film

== Accolades ==
List of awards and nominations received by Ariana Madix
Year	Ceremony	Award	Work	Result
2022	MTV Movie & TV Awards	Best Reality Romance (shared with Tom Sandoval)	Vanderpump Rules	Nominated
2023	MTV Movie & TV Awards	Best Reality Onscreen Team (shared with Katie Maloney, Scheana Shay, Lala Kent)	Vanderpump Rules	Won
2023	Us Weekly	Top 10 Reality Stars of the Year	Herself	1st place
2023	Variety	40 Most Powerful Women on Reality TV in 2023	Herself	Listed
2023	People	25 Most Intriguing People of the Year	Herself	Listed
2023	The New York Times	71 Most Stylish 'People' of 2023	Herself	Listed
2024	People's Choice Awards	The Reality TV Star of the Year	Vanderpump Rules	Nominated
2024	People's Choice Awards	The Competition Contestant of the Year	Dancing with the Stars	Won
2026	Primetime Creative Arts Emmy Awards	Outstanding Host for a Reality or Reality Competition Program	Love Island USA	Nominated

== Bibliography ==
Madix has written one book and co-written one cocktail book so far.

- Madix, Ariana; Sandoval, Tom (2019). Fancy AF Cocktails: Drink Recipes from a Couple of Professional Drinkers. Houghton Mifflin Harcourt.
- Madix, Ariana (2023). Single AF Cocktails. Clarkson Potter.

Media offices
Preceded by Sarah Hyland	Love Island host 2024–present	Succeeded by –
