= Danny Pellegrino =

American podcaster and writer

- Born: United States
- Citizenship: United States
- Occupations: Podcaster, writer, author, actor

Danny Pellegrino is an American podcaster, writer, author and actor.

He is perhaps best known for his podcast Everything Iconic.

Pellegrino has also written such books as the essay collection The Jolliest Bunch.

Television personality and actor Tom Sandoval is a co-author of the mixology book, Fancy AF Cocktails: Drink Recipes from a Couple of Professional Drinkers, which was written with Ariana Madix and Danny Pellegrino.
