= Vanderpump Dogs =

American reality television series

- Genre: Reality
- Starring: Lisa Vanderpump; Andrew Y. Kushnir; Summer Loftis; Brian L. Marshall; Patrick Miller-Wren; Madeline Quint; Kendall Young
- Music by: Signature Tracks
- Country of origin: United States
- Original language: English
- No. of seasons: 1
- No. of episodes: 6

Production
- Executive producers: Alex Baskin; Bill Langworthy; Brian McCarthy; Douglas Ross; Ken Todd; Lisa Vanderpump
- Producer: Mikayla Ferrin
- Editor: David Nippert
- Running time: 22 minutes
- Production company: Evolution Media

Original release
- Network: Peacock
- Release: June 9, 2021

Related
- The Real Housewives of Beverly Hills; Vanderpump Rules; Vanderpump Villa

Vanderpump Dogs is an American reality television series released on Peacock on June 9, 2021. Developed as the second spin-off of The Real Housewives of Beverly Hills, it focuses on Lisa Vanderpump and her staff as they run her dog foundation/rescue center of the same name.

== Plot ==
The series follows Lisa Vanderpump as she runs her dog foundation/rescue center, Vanderpump Dogs, along with her staff, and those who come to the foundation to adopt a new pet.

== Cast ==
- Andrew Y. Kushnir, the veterinarian at Vanderpump Dogs
- Summer Loftis, the director of marketing at Vanderpump Dogs
- Brian L. Marshall, a pet stylist at Vanderpump Dogs
- Patrick Miller-Wren, a pet stylist at Vanderpump Dogs
- Madeline Quint, the dog trainer at Vanderpump Dogs
- Lisa Vanderpump, the owner and manager of The Vanderpump Dog Foundation Rescue Center
- Kendall Young, the communications director at Vanderpump Dogs

== Episodes ==
No.	Title	Original release date
1	"A Paw-fect Perposal"	June 9, 2021
2	"The Doggy Wears Prada"	June 9, 2021
3	"Twinsies"	June 9, 2021
4	"10 Is the New 5"	June 9, 2021
5	"The Princess and the Pup"	June 9, 2021
6	"Cheaper by the Vanderdozen"	June 9, 2021

== Production ==
In July 2020, it was announced Peacock had ordered a series revolving around Lisa Vanderpump and her dog foundation, The Vanderpump Dog Foundation. The show was not renewed for a second season. Vanderpump, Ken Todd, Douglas Ross, Alex Baskin, Bill Langworthy and Brian McCarthy serve as executive producers, with Evolution Media serving as the studio on the series.
