= Tom Schwartz =

American television personality

- Born: Thomas William Schwartz; October 16, 1982 (age 43); Woodbury, Minnesota, U.S.
- Education: Florida State University
- Occupations: Television personality, restaurateur
- Years active: 2011–present
- Spouse: Katie Maloney (m. 2016; div. 2022)

Thomas William Schwartz (born October 16, 1982) is an American television personality and restaurateur.

== Early life and education ==
Schwartz was born and raised in Woodbury, Minnesota, alongside multiple siblings. He studied pre-medical at Florida State University.

== Career ==
Schwartz has appeared on multiple television shows, including Vanderpump Rules and The Valley.

In August of 2018, Schwartz opened a restaurant that he co-founded named Tom Tom in West Hollywood, California with friend (also Vanderpump Rules co-star) Tom Sandoval and Vanderpump Rules producers Lisa Vanderpump and Ken Todd. Both Schwartz and Sandoval invested $50,000 each for a five percent stake in the restaurant.

His restaurant Schwartz & Sandy's closed permanently.
