= Overserved with Lisa Vanderpump =

American reality television series

- Genre: Reality
- Starring: Lisa Vanderpump; Ken Todd; Pandora Vanderpump; Jason Sabo
- Theme music composer: Musicmind Group
- Country of origin: United States
- Original language: English
- No. of seasons: 1
- No. of episodes: 12

Production
- Executive producers: Alex Baskin; Bill Langworthy; Brian McCarthy; Douglas Ross; Aliyah Silverstein; Lisa Vanderpump
- Production location: Beverly Hills, California
- Editor: Jesse Friedman
- Running time: 21 minutes
- Production company: Evolution Media

Original release
- Network: E!
- Release: March 18 – May 27, 2021

Overserved with Lisa Vanderpump is an American reality television series which was broadcast on E! from March 18 to May 27, 2021. The series focuses on Vanderpump as she hosts celebrity guests and cooks intimate meals.

== Overview ==
In February 2021, People magazine confirmed the series has been picked up by the basic cable channel E!.

Overserved with Lisa Vanderpump focuses on Lisa Vanderpump as she invites viewers to her estate, Villa Rosa, in Beverly Hills, California, for an al fresco evening full of surprises and revealing moments, as she hosts two to three celebrity guests for an unforgettable night full of stiff cocktails, devilish fun and delicious feasts crafted entirely by Lisa herself.

== Cast ==
=== Main cast ===
- Lisa Vanderpump, host, television personality, businesswoman, and former actress
- Ken Todd, Lisa's husband, businessman, and executive producer
- Pandora Vanderpump, Lisa and Ken's daughter
- Jason Sabo, Lisa and Ken's son-in-law
- Puffy, Lisa's main dog (a pomeranian)
- Schnooky, Lisa's dog
- Hanky and Panky, Lisa's two swans
- Diamonds and Rosé, Lisa's two miniature horses

=== Guests ===
==== Episode 1 ====
- Lance Bass, singer and actor
- Vivica A. Fox, actress and producer
- Michael Turchin, Lance Bass' husband

==== Episode 2 ====
- Cheryl Hines, actress and director
- Joel McHale, actor and comedian

==== Episode 3 ====
- Trixie Mattel, drag queen and musician
- Iggy Azalea, rapper

==== Episode 4 ====
- Tori Spelling, heiress, actress and author
- Jeff Lewis, real estate speculator, interior designer and television and radio personality

==== Episode 5 ====
- Jeannie Mai, television host and stylist
- Meagan Good, actress
- Mama Mai, Jeannie's mother
- Nick Viall, television personality

==== Episode 6 ====
- Lala Kent, from Vanderpump Rules
- Anna Camp, actress and singer

==== Episode 7 ====
- Mario Lopez, actor, host and journalist
- Courtney Lopez, Mario Lopez's wife
- Sheryl Underwood, comedian, actress and television host

==== Episode 8 ====
- James Kennedy, from Vanderpump Rules
- Jim Jefferies, stand-up comedian, actor and writer
- Scheana, from Vanderpump Rules

==== Episode 9 ====
- Steve-O, entertainer, television personality and stunt performer
- Margaret Cho, comedian and actress

==== Episode 10 ====
- Heather Dubrow, actress and cast member on The Real Housewives of Orange County
- Dr. Terry Dubrow, plastic surgeon and television personality
- Loni Love, actress, comedian and television personality

==== Episode 11 ====
- Gabriel "Fluffy" Iglesias, stand-up comedian
- Cheryl Burke, dancer, model and television host

==== Episode 12 ====
- Jaleel White, actor
- Kym Whitley, comedian and actress

== Episodes ==
No.	Title	Original release date
1	"An Evening in Provence"	March 18, 2021
Lisa transports her best friend Lance Bass and actress Vivica A. Fox to the South of France with a Provence-themed party, and serial pranker Lance gets a taste of his own medicine.
2	"A Tuscan Feast"	March 25, 2021
Lisa creates an al fresco Tuscan feast for Italian-born Joel McHale and actress Cheryl Hines; the day includes a mystery blindfold game, flaming cheese pasta and Lisa playfully confronting Joel about things he's said about her in the past.
3	"Diva Tea"	April 1, 2021
Lisa throws a proper English tea with some very improper conversation, as Iggy Azalea and Trixie Mattel share tales of red carpet underwear fails, one-night stands, and a famous baby daddy.
4	"Cabo Fiesta"	April 8, 2021
Lisa re-creates her favourite moments from years of vacationing in Mexico with a night of margaritas, seafood, surprise secrets and wild dares with Tori Spelling and Jeff Lewis.
5	"A Night in Morocco"	April 15, 2021
Things get wild on the Villa Rosa dance floor. Lisa welcomes Jeannie Mai and Meagan Good to her home for an evening of Moroccan-inspired food, drink and dares.
6	"Ladies Who Brunch"	April 22, 2021
Lisa hosts a decadent weekend brunch for her busy friends - a very candid Anna Camp and a very pregnant Lala Kent (from Vanderpump Rules) - and we'll learn why you don't want to cross any of these ladies.
7	"Traditional English Roast"	April 29, 2021
Lisa brings London to Beverly Hills with an English Roast dinner for dear friend Mario Lopez and the hilarious Sheryl Underwood. The evening gets wild with Rosé Pong, Spotted Dick, and some roasting of the host courtesy of Sheryl.
8	"Very Vanderpump"	May 6, 2021
Lisa rolls out the best of signature Vanderpump style, decor and food for a reformed James Kennedy (from Vanderpump Rules) and the outrageous Jim Jefferies. It's all about the (lobster) pasta! Surprise guest Scheana joins via FaceTime.
9	"Go Greek"	May 13, 2021
Lisa transforms her olive grove for a trip to Greece - complete with a ten-dish feast and an Olympic game. Fearless guests Steve-O and Margaret Cho serve up unexpected moments, like an impromptu BDSM lesson and highly inappropriate temporary tattoos.
10	"Beverly Hills Comfort Food"	May 20, 2021
Lisa proves the best things in life aren't always the fanciest, as she treats Heather, Dr. Terry Dubrow and comic Loni Love to a night of indulgent comfort food, decadent drinks and even a 20-foot beer bong — filled with champagne, of course.
11	"Back to Ibiza"	May 27, 2021
Dancing with the Stars Cheryl Burke and comedian Gabriel "Fluffy" Iglesias join Lisa in celebrating her love of the food and culture of Ibiza, Spain.
12	"A Trip to Japan"	May 27, 2021
Lisa welcomes Jaleel White and Kym Whitley to an evening of Japanese culinary delights.

== Production ==
Alex Baskin, Bill Langworthy, Brian McCarthy, Douglas Ross, Aliyah Silverstein, and Lisa Vanderpump serve as executive producers, with Evolution Media serving as the studio.
