= Schwartz & Sandy's =

Defunct bar and restaurant in Los Angeles, California, U.S.

- Interactive map of Schwartz & Sandy's

Restaurant information
- Established: November 2022
- Closed: 2024
- Owners: Tom Sandoval; Tom Schwartz
- Location: 1917 North Bronson Avenue, Los Angeles, California, United States
- Coordinates: 34°06′21″N 118°19′07″W

Schwartz & Sandy's was a bar and restaurant in Los Angeles, California, United States. It was established by co-owners Tom Sandoval and Tom Schwartz in November 2022. The restaurant closed permanently in 2024, operating for approximately two years.

== Description ==
The bar and restaurant Schwartz & Sandy's operated in a strip mall in Franklin Village, Los Angeles. It served American cuisine. The menu included chicken tenders, lobster corndogs, and Strawberry Schwartz cake. Other food options included beignets with Gruyère cheese and wild mushrooms, steak with French fries and chimichurri, a tahini Caesar salad with falafel croutons, and "Juicy Lucy" sliders with American cheese and ale-braised onions. The drink menu included tropical drinks such as a Mai Tai with spiced wine syrup and a Manhattan with Thai tea, as well as wine by the glass or bottle.

== History ==
Schwartz & Sandy's opened in November 2022, ahead of the premiere of the tenth season of Vanderpump Rules. It operated in the space previously occupied by La Villita Cantina.

On November 25, 2024, Sandoval and Schwartz announced that Schwartz & Sandy's would close in late December.

== Reception ==
In 2024, Brant Cox of The Infatuation wrote, "Schwartz & Sandy’s is the best of the Vanderpump Rules restaurants, which is like being the fastest walker at the Broken Foot Convention... During a recent visit for dinner and drinks, we were the only people in the place for nearly two hours (except for a bored bartender). Even the solid lobster corn dogs can't salvage what is an objectively depressing environment."

== See also ==
- List of defunct restaurants of the United States
- Pump Restaurant
- Tom Tom (restaurant)
