= Buying Back My Daughter =

2023 American TV film by Troy Scott

- Official release poster
- Written by: Barbara Marshall
- Directed by: Troy Scott
- Starring: Meagan Good; Ariana Madix; Faith Wright
- Countries of origin: United States; Canada
- Original language: English

Production
- Executive producers: Megan Good; Orly Adelson; Allen Lewis
- Producer: Charles Cooper
- Cinematography: Adam Sliwinski
- Editor: Arlein Wharf-Garcia
- Production company: Front Street Pictures

Original release
- Network: Lifetime
- Release: October 7, 2023

Buying Back My Daughter is a 2023 American-Canadian drama television film directed by Troy Scott, and starring Meagan Good, Ariana Madix. Based on a true story of a mother trying to get her daughter back when she goes missing and is forced into sex trafficking. It premiered on Lifetime on October 7, 2023.

The film was produced by Front Street Pictures and distributed by Lifetime, as part of the network's "Stop Violence Against Women Campaign".

== Plot ==
When sixteen-year-old Alicia goes missing after attending a party, her parents spend almost a year searching for her. Dana and Curtis ultimately find Alicia in the horrifying world of online escort services and must do whatever it takes to retrieve her from her abductors.

== Cast ==
- Meagan Good as Dana
- Roger Cross as Curtis
- Ariana Madix as Karen
- Faith Wright as Alicia
- Brenna O'Brien as Lori
- Aaron Douglas as Ron
