= Tom Tom (restaurant) =

Restaurant in West Hollywood, California, U.S.

- Interactive map of Tom Tom

Restaurant information
- Established: August 9, 2018
- Location: 8932 Santa Monica Boulevard, West Hollywood, California, 90069, United States
- Coordinates: 34.0840°N 118.3848°W
- Website: tomtombar.la

Tom Tom (also known as TomTom) is a bar and restaurant in West Hollywood, California, United States. The restaurant's name was derived from two of the founders' first names, Tom Sandoval and Tom Schwartz.

== Description ==
The bar and restaurant Tom Tom operates in West Hollywood, California. The interior has a large bar, chandeliers, and a "rustic Victorian" theme, according to People magazine. Out magazine said Tom Tom has "an intimate ambiance is complemented by an industrial romantic motif" and "beckons old Hollywood for a generation of social media influencers".

== History ==
Tom Tom opened on August 9, 2018. The business was created by Tom Sandoval and Tom Schwartz, as well as Lisa Vanderpump and her husband Ken Todd. Sandoval has been the "chief mixologist".

== Reception ==
In 2022, Brant Cox of The Infatuation wrote, "Compared to Lisa Vanderpump’s other restaurant (SUR), the food and cocktails at Tom Tom are actually pretty good. But everything at this spot is still pretty terrible. The tandoori chicken is just grilled chicken on top of room temperature pita, and the sliders are 95% hamburger bun. The cocktails are weak and uninventive, and the steampunk/clock aesthetic just kind of feels like you’re on the Snow White ride at Disneyland." He continued, "None of this even matters though because if you’re here in the first place, it's to watch not-famous people pretend they are famous. And that’s all the nourishment you need."

== See also ==
- Pump Restaurant
- Schwartz & Sandy's
- Villa Blanca
