= Ken Todd (entrepreneur) =

British-American restaurateur

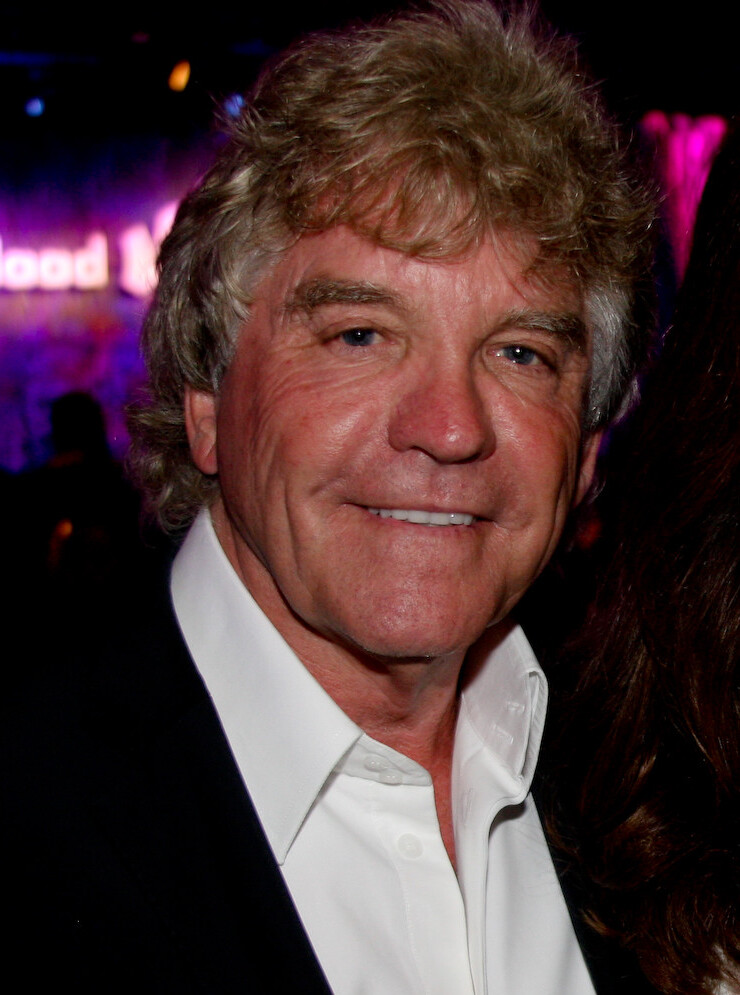
- Ken Todd in 2012
- Occupations: Entrepreneur; restaurateur
- Spouse(s): Pamela Todd (c. 1964–c. 1966); Lisa Vanderpump (m. 1982)

Ken Todd is a British-American entrepreneur and restaurateur. He is married to Lisa Vanderpump. The couple have co-owned multiple restaurants, including Pump Restaurant, SUR Restaurant & Lounge, Tom Tom, and Villa Blanca.

== Early life ==
Todd was born in the United Kingdom.

== Career ==
Todd and his wife Lisa Vanderpump have owned multiple restaurants together, including Pump Restaurant, SUR Restaurant & Lounge, Tom Tom, and Villa Blanca. In 2025, the couple reached a settlement with former employees of Pump.

Todd produced the album Pump Sessions for James Kennedy of Vanderpump Rules.

== Personal life ==
Todd was previously married to Pamela Todd. The couple were together for approximately two years and had a son Warren in 1966.

Todd and Vanderpump got married in 1982. The couple have two children together, a daughter, Pandora, and son Max. Max is adopted.

== Filmography ==
- The Real Housewives of Beverly Hills
- Vanderpump Rules
