= Pump Restaurant =

Defunct restaurant in West Hollywood, California, U.S.

- Interactive map of Pump Restaurant

Restaurant information
- Location: West Hollywood, California, United States
- Coordinates: 34.0837°N 118.3853°W

Pump Restaurant, or simply Pump, was a restaurant in West Hollywood, California, United States. It was operated by Lisa Vanderpump. It was described as an "offshoot" of SUR Restaurant & Lounge.

== History ==
A car crashed into the restaurant's entrance in 2020. Pump closed in 2023.

== See also ==
- List of defunct restaurants of the United States
- Schwartz & Sandy's
- Tom Tom (restaurant)
- Villa Blanca
