= Villa Blanca =

Defunct restaurant in Beverly Hills, California, U.S.

- Interactive map of Villa Blanca

Restaurant information
- Location: 9601 Brighton Way, Beverly Hills, California, United States
- Coordinates: 34°04′07″N 118°24′15″W

Villa Blanca was a restaurant in Beverly Hills, California, United States. It closed permanently in 2020, after operating for approximately twelve years.

== Description ==
The restaurant Villa Blanca operated in Beverly Hills, California. It served Mediterranean (especially Italian) cuisine.

== History ==
The restaurant opened in 2008 or 2009. Lisa Vanderpump attempted to sell the business in 2014.

The business faced a sexual discrimination lawsuit, as well as lease issues.

Villa Blanca closed in 2020, as a result of the impact of the COVID-19 pandemic.

== See also ==
- Impact of the COVID-19 pandemic on the restaurant industry in the United States
- List of defunct restaurants of the United States
- Pump Restaurant
- SUR Restaurant & Lounge
- Tom Tom (restaurant)
