= SUR Restaurant & Lounge =

Restaurant in West Hollywood, California, U.S.

- Interactive map of SUR Restaurant & Lounge

Restaurant information
- Owners: Ken Todd; Lisa Vanderpump; Guillermo Zapata
- Food type: American
- Location: 606-614 North Robertson Boulevard, West Hollywood, California, 90069, United States
- Coordinates: 34.0812°N 118.3854°W
- Website: surrestaurant.com

SUR Restaurant & Lounge is a restaurant in West Hollywood, California, United States. It serves American cuisine and has been featured on the American reality television series Vanderpump Rules.

== Description and history ==
"SUR" is an acronym for Sexy Unique Restaurant. According to Delish, the restaurant was co-owner Lisa Vanderpump's second in Greater Los Angeles and SUR "became the setting for raucous parties, explosive arguments, and plenty of iconic TV moments". Vanderpump's husband Ken Todd is also a co-owner. Guillermo Zapata is a co-owner.

== Reception ==
The Infatuation has said, "Simply by walking into this place, you feel duped. There's a significant chance your reservation was lost the second you made it. The food is tasteless and served exclusively at room temperature. You'll see a few catatonic employees staring off into space. That's it. Nobody here is in on the joke because there's no joke being told. SUR truly believes it's one of LA's great restaurants, and that's not ironic, it’s just delusional."

== See also ==
- Pump Restaurant
- Tom Tom (restaurant)
- Villa Blanca
