= Lisa Vanderpump =

English television personality and actress (born 1960)

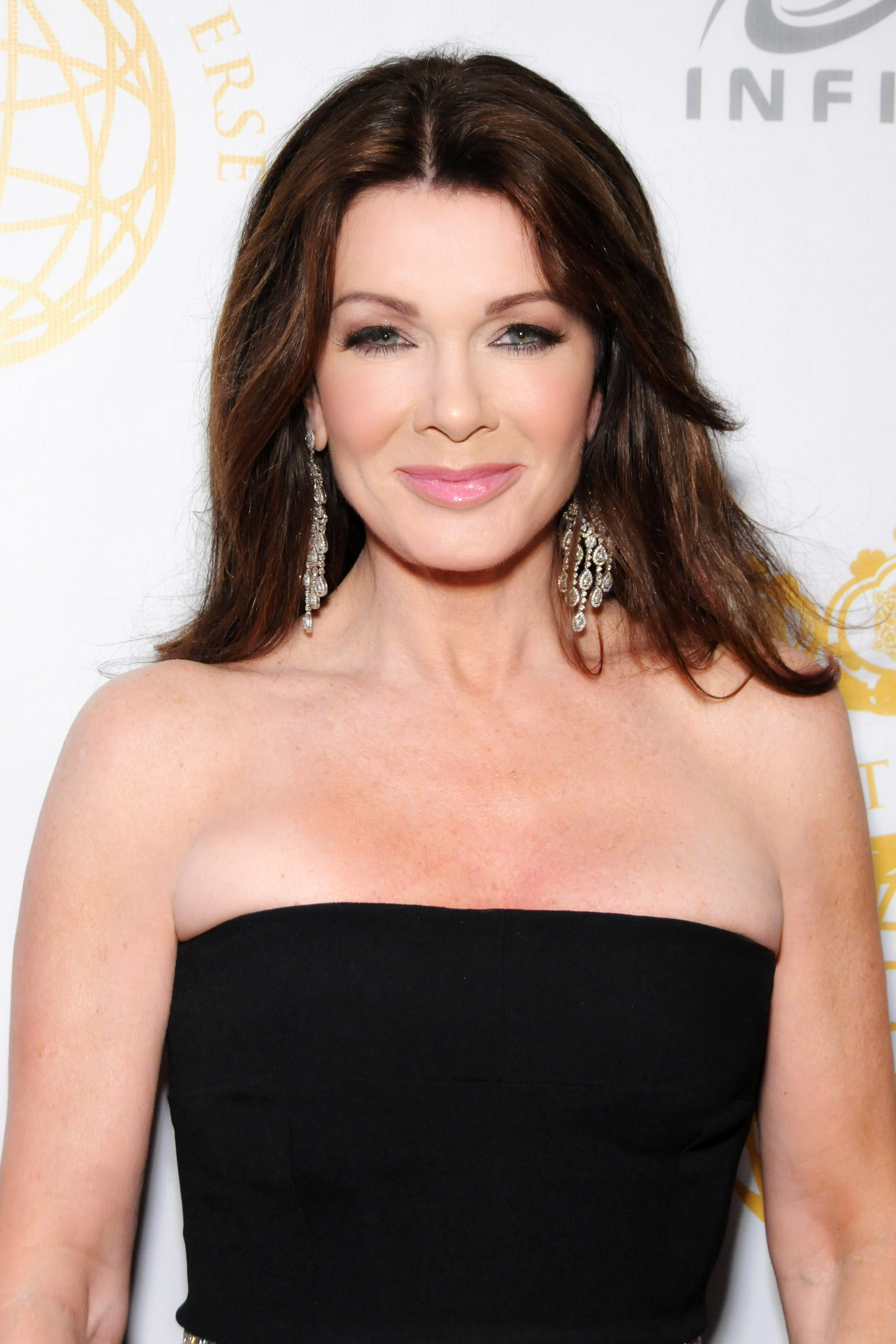
- Vanderpump in 2014
- Born: Lisa Jane Vanderpump; 15 September 1960 (age 66); Dulwich, London, England
- Education: Corona Academy
- Occupations: Businesswoman; restaurateur; entrepreneur; television personality; activist
- Years active: 1973–present
- Organization: The Vanderpump Dog Foundation
- Television: The Real Housewives of Beverly Hills; Vanderpump Rules; Overserved with Lisa Vanderpump; Vanderpump Dogs; Vanderpump Villa
- Spouse: Ken Todd (m. 1982)
- Children: 2
- Honours: Palm Springs Walk of Stars; Keys to Beverly Hills & Las Vegas
- Website: vanderpumpfamilybrands.com

Signature
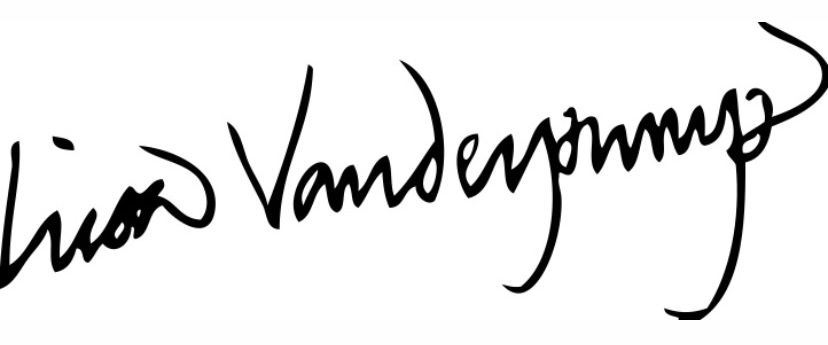

Lisa Jane Vanderpump (born 15 September 1960) is an English restaurateur, businesswoman, entrepreneur, activist and television personality. Since emigrating to the United States from the United Kingdom, Vanderpump has been in the restaurant industry, along with her husband Ken Todd. She initially gained fame as a main cast member on The Real Housewives of Beverly Hills (2010–2019). Her West Hollywood, California restaurant and lounge, SUR (short for Sexy Unique Restaurant), along with its staff, are the premise to Bravo's Vanderpump Rules (2013–present), in which she is a cast member and executive producer.

Other producing television projects include E!'s Overserved with Lisa Vanderpump, Peacock's Vanderpump Dogs (both 2021), and Hulu's Vanderpump Villa (2024–present), all of which she executively produced. Vanderpump is an animal rights activist and the founder of The Vanderpump Dog Foundation, a 501(c)(3) non-profit animal rescue organization that works with domestic and international fronts. In 2026, Vanderpump expanded her hospitality by opening The Vanderpump Hotel in Las Vegas, Nevada, overtaking the former site of The Cromwell.

== Early life ==
Lisa Jane Vanderpump was born in Dulwich, London. on 15 September 1960, Her father was an art director at an advertising agency. She had one twin brother, Mark, who was a DJ and businessman. Vanderpump started ballet lessons at three. She attended Riverston School in Lee Green, South London. She was enrolled in the Corona Academy drama school at the age of nine.

By the age of 19, she had a flat in Fulham, West London. Vanderpump says she was financially self-sufficient after leaving home, with "just a good education and a kick in the arse."

== Career ==
=== Acting ===
Vanderpump made her film debut at the age of 13, as an uncredited extra in the 1973 romantic comedy A Touch of Class. She portrayed Julia Allessio, the daughter of Glenda Jackson's character. Her credited film debut was as Anne in the 1978 horror Killer's Moon. At the age of 14, she made her television debut with the role of Ursula Marsh in John Halifax, Gentleman on its premier episode in 1974. She had small roles in various episodic television programmes throughout the 1970s, 80s, and 90s, including Silk Stalkings and Baywatch Nights. Vanderpump has been featured in over 100 commercials for brands including Maltesers, Lilt, Britvic 55 and Hamlet cigars. Vanderpump appeared in the 1980s music videos "Poison Arrow" and "Mantrap" by the pop band ABC and "(What) In The Name of Love" by the duo Naked Eyes. She also appeared in the 2014 music video for "G.U.Y." by Lady Gaga.

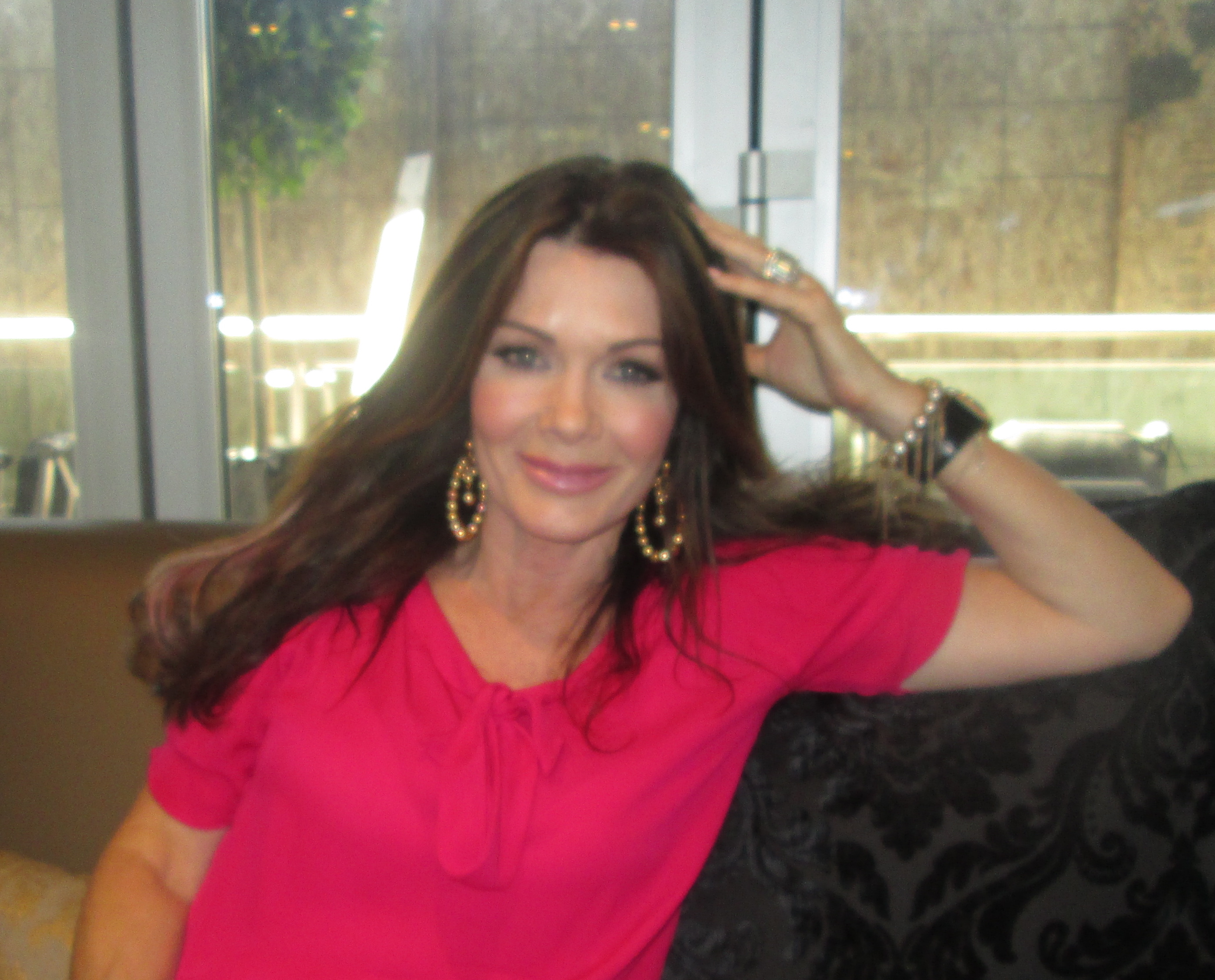
Lisa Vanderpump at PUMP restaurant one day before opening night party, 2014

=== Hospitality ===
Vanderpump and her husband partnered with husband-and-wife team Guillermo Zapata and Nathalie Pouille Zapata to be co-owners of SUR Restaurant & Lounge in May 2005. The restaurant was the original focus of Vanderpump Rules and is located in West Hollywood, California. In August 2009, she opened Villa Blanca, a Mediterranean inspired restaurant. Vanderpump contrasted SUR and Villa Blanca by saying, "Villa Blanca's where you take your wife, and SUR's where you take your mistress." Villa Blanca closed in July 2020 during the COVID-19 pandemic. Vanderpump opened her third restaurant, Pump Restaurant & Lounge in May 2014; her second restaurant in West Hollywood. She closed the establishment in July 2023. Vanderpump and her husband partnered with Tom Sandoval and Tom Schwartz to open Tom Tom, her fourth restaurant, once again in West Hollywood, in July 2018. In February 2019, the restaurant was named Best Bar in Southern California by Los Angeles Travel Magazine.

In March 2019, she opened Vanderpump Cocktail Garden, her first Las Vegas venue, located in Caesars Palace. In April 2022, Vanderpump opened Vanderpump à Paris, her second Las Vegas venue located in the Paris Las Vegas casino hotel. In April 2024, she launched Wolf by Vanderpump, her third Nevada venture located at Harvey's Lake Tahoe. Vanderpump opened her third Las Vegas restaurant, Pinky's at the Flamingo, on 6 December 2024.

==== The Vanderpump Hotel ====
In 2025, plans were announced that Vanderpump had partnered with Caesars Entertainment to renovate the former location of The Cromwell Hotel on the Las Vegas Strip to reopen as the Vanderpump Hotel, marking Vanderpump's debut as a hotelier, and fourth Nevada venue. The Vanderpump Hotel Las Vegas held its grand opening on 11 June 2026, where Vanderpump was presented with a Key to The Strip by Clark County Commissioner Tick Segerblom. The 188-room boutique hotel was designed by Vanderpump alongside Nick Alain through the pair's design company Vanderpump Alain. In its first three months of operations, The Vanderpump Hotel earned the AAA Four Diamond designation.

=== Unscripted television and producing ===
She debuted on Bravo's reality television series The Real Housewives of Beverly Hills on 14 October 2010, and is an original main cast member of the series. On 3 June 2019, she announced her departure from the series after nine seasons following controversy widely referred to as "Puppygate." The controversy centered on a dog that Dorit Kemsley adopted from Vanderpump's rescue organization and subsequently re-homed in violation of the adoption contract. When the story became public, the cast accused Vanderpump of leaking the story which she denied. Vanderpump took a polygraph test on camera. Socially isolated from the group, Vanderpump stopped filming with other cast members for the remainder of the season and declined to attend the season-end reunion.

Vanderpump has been a cast member and an executive producer on a spin-off of The Real Housewives of Beverly Hills, Vanderpump Rules, since the shows inception on 7 January 2013. She competed in the 16th season of Dancing with the Stars, partnered with professional dancer Gleb Savchenko, debuting on 18 March 2013. They were the second couple eliminated, leaving in tenth place on 9 April.

Vanderpump began hosting E!'s Overserved with Lisa Vanderpump in March 2021. The series focuses on Vanderpump as she hosts celebrity guests and cooks intimate meals. Also in March 2021 she featured as a judge on ABC's Pooch Perfect. The series was hosted by Rebel Wilson and featured Jorge Bendersky and Dr. Callie Harris as judges. Vanderpump was featured in a second spin-off from The Real Housewives of Beverly Hills, Peacock's Vanderpump Dogs, in June 2021. The series focuses on Vanderpump and her staff as they run her dog foundation/rescue centre in Los Angeles. Vanderpump is a main cast member and an executive producer on Hulu's Vanderpump Villa. The series premiered on 1 April 2024.

=== Business ventures ===
Vanderpump launched Vanderpump Vodka, her first alcoholic beverage, in 2013. She later launched LVP Sangria, her second alcoholic beverage, in February 2014, and later rebranded the beverage to Vanderpump Sangria. She launched Vanderpump Rosé, her first wine, in April 2017. After the success of her rosé, she launched Vanderpump Wines in April 2020.

In November 2014, she released Vanderpump Beverly Hills by Pop Culture Promotions, a line of homewares. In July 2019, Vanderpump, partnered with Nick Alain, an industrial designer and creative director who helped her design her restaurant Tom Tom, launched Vanderpump Alain, a home collections line.

=== Other ventures ===
In November 2012, Vanderpump launched Very Vanderpump, a lifestyle blog. Vanderpump was named editor-in-chief of Beverly Hills Lifestyle Magazine in March 2017. She left the position in October 2018.

== Activism and recognition ==
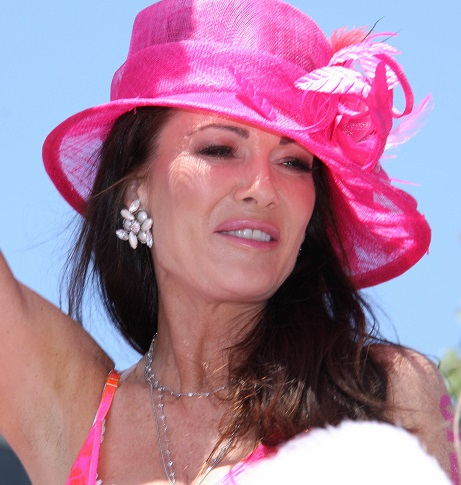
Lisa Vanderpump at the 2013 West Hollywood Pride Parade

Vanderpump received the Key to the City of Beverly Hills, California in March 2013, from then mayor Jimmy Delshad, who also declared 1 March 'Lisa Vanderpump Day', in recognition of her charitable and philanthropic work. In July 2014, Vanderpump was honoured with a Golden Palm Star on the Palm Springs Walk of Stars. In December, she served as the city's Celebrity Grand Marshal for the 23rd annual Palm Springs Festival of Lights Parade. In October 2014, Vanderpump led the 30th Annual AIDS Walk in Los Angeles. In August 2015, Vanderpump received the Ally Leadership Award from the LGBT rights organisation, Equality California. In March 2015, Vanderpump was named 'Woman of the Year' by the California State Assembly Assemblyman Richard Bloom for her lesbian and gay activism.

In March 2015, Vanderpump spoke about Ebola at the United Nations' "Stop Ebola and Build For the Future" relief concert.

She organised a peaceful protest march against the Yulin Dog Meat Festival in October 2015. The march went from MacArthur Park to the Chinese Consulate General in Los Angeles and started a movement to end the abuse, torture and slaughter of dogs worldwide. Together with her husband Ken and their partner, John Sessa, they launched the Stop Yulin Forever campaign. Vanderpump went on to address Congress about the same issues. Vanderpump produced a documentary, The Road To Yulin… And Beyond, in March 2018, to draw attention to the Yulin Dog Meat Festival and bring it to an end.

=== The Vanderpump Dog Foundation ===
The Vanderpump Dog Foundation was launched online in 2016. On 1 March 2017, Vanderpump opened the Vanderpump Dogs rescue center in Los Angeles. She also owns and operates two rescue centers in China. During the COVID-19 pandemic hit the United States, Vanderpump raised US$383,511.14 through Cameo for her foundation, as of February 2023. Vanderpump Dogs has saved "approximately 3,000 dogs domestically from kill shelters to date", as of February 2023. In February 2023, The Vanderpump Dog Foundation rescued and rehomed 3,000 dogs in the Los Angeles area.

== Personal life ==
Vanderpump met her husband, businessman Ken Todd, at his first bar, Cork's Wine Bar in Kensington, London, in May 1982. The couple wed on 28 August 1982, at a United Reformed Church. Together they have two children: a daughter, and an adopted son. She has one stepson from her husband's first marriage. She has two grandsons.

She primarily resides in Beverly Hills, California. She has lived in London, Cheltenham, Monaco, and the South of France. She also owns property in Montecito. Vanderpump sold her Beverly Park home in 2011 for US$18.8 million and bought her US$12 million estate, Villa Rosa, in the Beverly Crest neighbourhood. In 2024, she purchased a home in the Southern Highlands Golf Club neighborhood in Las Vegas, Nevada.

== Filmography ==
=== As an actress ===
| Year | Show | Role | Notes |
|---|---|---|---|
| 1973 | A Touch of Class | Julia Allessio | Uncredited |
| 1974 | John Halifax, Gentleman | Ursula March, as a girl | Episode: "Episode #1.1" |
| 1975 | Tommy | Girl at Christmas Party | Uncredited |
| 1975 | Lisztomania | Audience member | Uncredited |
| 1976 | Bugsy Malone | Girl at Fat Sam's Speakeasy | Uncredited |
| 1976 | Katy | Mary | 2 episodes |
| 1978 | Killer's Moon | Anne | |
| 1979 | Kids | Lucille Wyatt | 5 episodes |
| 1980 | The Wildcats of St Trinian's | Ursula | |
| 1980 | Leap in the Dark | Jackie | Episode: "Jack Be Nimble" |
| 1981 | Sunday Night Thriller | Young Eliane Label | Episode: "I Thought They Died Years Ago" |
| 1981 | Storybook International | Cap | Episode: "Cap O' Rushes" |
| 1982 | Something in Disguise | Sandra Mount | 2 episodes |
| 1983 | Arena | Caroline | 1 episode |
| 1983 | Kelly Monteith | Sarah Wright | 6 episodes |
| 1993 | Silk Stalkings | Coleen Osgood | Episode: "Team Spirit" |
| 1995 | Separate Lives | Heidi Porter | |
| 1995 | Baywatch Nights | Margo Curtis | Episode: "Just a Gigolo" |
| 2014 | The Comeback | Lisa Vanderpump | Episode: "Valerie Makes a Pilot" |
| 2016 | The Royal Hangover | Lisa Vanderpump | 1 episode |
| 2016 | Almost Royal | Lisa Vanderpump | Episode: "Work" |
| 2020 | American Housewife | Lisa Vanderpump | Episode: "Vacation!" |

=== As herself ===
| Year | Show | Notes |
|---|---|---|
| 2010–2019 | The Real Housewives of Beverly Hills | 197 episodes |
| 2011 | 2011 New Now Next Awards | TV special |
| 2012 | 2012 Hero Dog Awards | TV special |
| 2012 | Miss Universe 2012 | Judge |
| 2013–present | Vanderpump Rules | 198 episodes; also Creator and Executive Producer |
| 2013 | Dancing with the Stars | Season 16 contestant; 8 episodes |
| 2014 | Kitten Bowl | Television film |
| 2014 | E! News Special: Closet Envy | TV Movie |
| 2015 | The World Dog Awards | TV special |
| 2015 | Miss Universe 2014 | Judge |
| 2015 | Reality Television Awards | TV special |
| 2017 | Hollywood Medium With Tyler Henry | 1 episode |
| 2017 | Then and Now with Andy Cohen | 2 episodes |
| 2017 | The Road To Yulin And Beyond | Documentary, also Producer |
| 2019 | World's Most Amazing Dog | Facebook TV series – 9 episodes |
| 2019 | MasterChef | MasterChef: Celebrity Family Showdown |
| 2019 | Celebrity Family Feud | 2 episodes |
| 2019–2022 | Celebrity Page | 7 episodes |
| 2020 | Celebrities with Hearts | 1 episode |
| 2020 | Harry & Meghan: The Royals in Crisis | Contributor |
| 2020 | Los Angeles City of Dreams and Fallen Angels | Short |
| 2020 | Barkitecture | 1 episode |
| 2020 | Hell's Kitchen | 1 episode |
| 2021 | Pooch Perfect US | Judge |
| 2021 | For Real: The Story of Reality TV | 2 episodes |
| 2021 | Overserved with Lisa Vanderpump | 12 episodes; Host |
| 2021 | Vanderpump Dogs | 6 episodes; |
| 2022 | On Tour on Course | 1 episode |
| 2022 | Trixie Motel | Episode: "Pink Flamingo" |
| 2023 | 2023 White House Correspondents' Dinner | TV Special |
| 2024–present | Vanderpump Villa | 22 episodes; also Executive Producer |
| 2024 | Gordon Ramsay's Food Stars | Co-host with Gordon Ramsay |
| 2025 | Made in Chelsea | 1 episode |

== Published works ==
- Vanderpump, Lisa (2011). Simply Divine: A Guide to Easy, Elegant, and Affordable Entertaining. Running Press. ISBN 978-0-7624-4923-1.

== State honors ==
City Keys given to Lisa Vanderpump
| Year | Recipient | Category | Notes | Ref |
|---|---|---|---|---|
| 2011 | Lisa Vanderpump | Key to the City of Beverly Hills, California | Granted by Jimmy Delshad, who declared March 1 "Lisa Vanderpump Day" | |
| 2026 | Lisa Vanderpump | Key to the City of Las Vegas, Nevada | Granted by Tick Segerblom at the grand opening of The Vanderpump Hotel | |

== Honours and awards ==
In December 2019, she won the NFTA National Film & TV Award for Best Female Reality TV Star.

In April 2026, Vanderpump was honoured as the Nevada Ballet Theatre Woman of the Year.

| Year | Award | Category | Work | Result |
|---|---|---|---|---|
| 2018 | MTV Movie & TV Award | Best Reality Series/Franchise | Vanderpump Rules | Nominated |
| 2019 | People's Choice Award | The Reality TV Star of 2019 | Herself | Nominated |
| 2019 | People's Choice Award | The Reality Show of 2019 | Vanderpump Rules | Nominated |
| 2019 | MTV Movie & TV Award | Best Reality Royalty | Vanderpump Rules | Nominated |
| 2023 | TCA Award | Outstanding Achievement in Reality | Vanderpump Rules | Nominated |
| 2023 | Critics' Choice Real TV Award | Best Unstructured Series | Vanderpump Rules | Won |
| 2023 | Critics' Choice Real TV Award | Best Ensemble Cast in an Unscripted Series | Vanderpump Rules | Nominated |
| 2023 | Critics' Choice Real TV Award | Impact Award | Herself | Honored |
| 2023 | MTV Movie & TV Award | Best Docu-Reality Show | Vanderpump Rules | Nominated |
| 2023 | Primetime Emmy Award | Outstanding Unstructured Reality Program | Vanderpump Rules | Nominated |
| 2024 | Primetime Emmy Award | Outstanding Unstructured Reality Program | Vanderpump Rules | Nominated |
| 2024 | Critics' Choice Real TV Award | Best Ensemble Cast in an Unscripted Series | Vanderpump Rules | Nominated |
| 2024 | People's Choice Award | The Show of the Year | Vanderpump Rules | Nominated |
| 2024 | People's Choice Award | The Reality Show of the Year | Vanderpump Rules | Nominated |
