= Kristen Doute =

American television personality

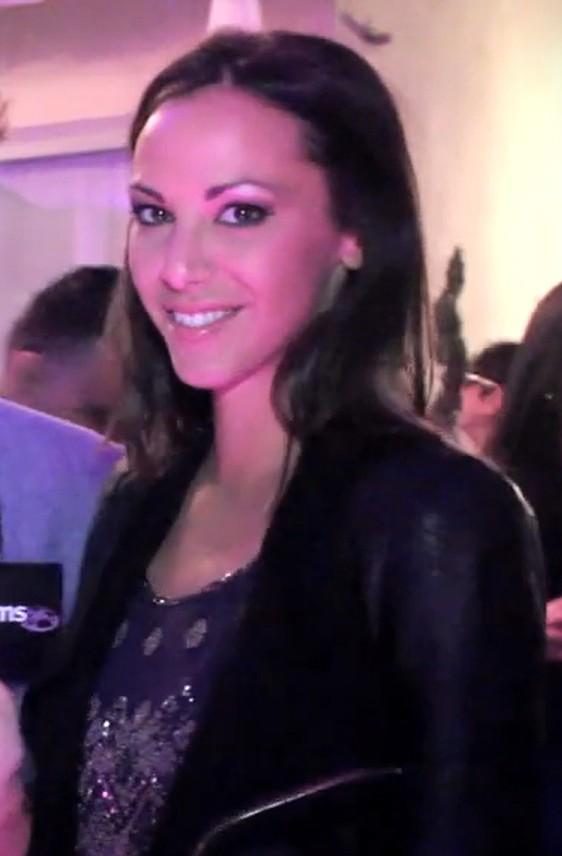
- Doute in 2014
- Born: February 17, 1983 (age 43); Dearborn, Michigan, U.S.
- Occupations: Television personality, clothing designer, entrepreneur, actress, author, podcast host
- Television: Vanderpump Rules (2013–2020); The Valley (2024–present)
- Partner(s): Luke Broderick (2022–present; engaged)
- Children: 1

Kristen Doute (born February 17, 1983) is an American television personality, entrepreneur, actress and author. She was a series regular on the Bravo reality television series Vanderpump Rules (2013–2020) for eight seasons and currently stars in its spin-off series The Valley (2024–present).

== Early life ==
Doute was born and raised in Dearborn, Michigan in Metro Detroit. She is of Lebanese and Irish descent.

== Career ==
=== Television ===
As an aspiring actress, Doute began working as a server at Lisa Vanderpump's restaurant SUR in West Hollywood, California. There, she was cast as an original series regular on Bravo TV's Vanderpump Rules, a spin-off of The Real Housewives of Beverly Hills. The series follows Vanderpump's employees as they work on building their futures in show business and become entangled in interpersonal drama. On June 9, 2020, it was announced that Kristen was fired for calling the police multiple times on Faith Stowers. Doute and co-star Stassi Schroeder filed a false police report against Stowers for a crime she did not commit. Bravo announced in March 2023, that Doute would return to Vanderpump Rules during season 10 as fans watched the "Scandoval" love triangle play out on their screens.

On May 1, 2023, The Hollywood Reporter announced that Doute would appear in Amazon Freevee's upcoming competition series, The Goat. The show follows fan favorite reality television personalities going through a series of mental, physical, and social challenges with a chance to win a cash prize. The series premiered on May 9, 2024. She was the fourth contestant to be voted off the competition.

On June 28, 2023, Variety reported that a Vanderpump Rules spin-off starring Jax Taylor, Brittany Cartwright and Doute was in early development at Bravo. On January 18, 2024, Bravo released a trailer for the reality series called The Valley, which premiered on March 19, 2024. In May 2024, The Valley was renewed for a second season, with the full cast returning.. Season 3 aired in 2026, with Doute in the main cast in all episodes.

=== Writing ===
On October 21, 2019, it was announced that Doute's first book, He's Making You Crazy, a humorous autobiographical guide to relationships, would be published by Chicago Review Press on June 2, 2020. The book is a collaboration with Michele Alexander. Doute first reported she was working on the book in 2016.

=== Businesses ===
In 2014, Doute launched a clothing line, James Mae, named after her nephew and niece. The line features graphic tees and sweatshirts for men and women, with classic and vintage rock and roll designs. Doute relaunched James Mae in 2019 with business partner Magen Mattox, maintaining a vintage rock aesthetic and expanding the product line.

In February 2019, Doute and her Vanderpump Rules co-stars, Schroeder and Katie Maloney, launched a pinot grigio wine in partnership with actor Stephen Amell's company Nocking Point Wines, called "Basic Witch Potion No. 1". Their second collaboration with Nocking Point Wines, a rosé called "Basic Witch Potion No. 2", was launched in June 2019. In June 2020, "Basic Witch Potion No.1" and "Basic Witch Potion No.2" were removed from Nocking Point Wines' store following the firings of Doute and Schroeder. On April 13, 2023, Nocking Point Wines announced a relaunch of "Basic Witch Potion No. 1" with Maloney and Doute.

=== Podcasts ===
In November 2022, Kristen launched a podcast titled, "Sex, Love...and What Else Matters" with her boyfriend Luke Broderick.

== Personal life ==
Doute dated Tom Sandoval from 2007 to 2013, but the two ended their relationship after it was revealed that Doute had an affair with Vanderpump Rules co-star, Jax Taylor. Sandoval also cheated on her with co-star Ariana Madix. Following her breakup with Sandoval, Doute dated another Vanderpump Rules co-star, James Kennedy, in 2014. From 2016 to 2019, she dated Brian Carter, and from 2020 to June 2022, she dated realtor Alex Menache.

In December 2022, Doute confirmed that she was in a relationship with Luke Broderick. The couple became engaged in September 2024 and announced Doute's pregnancy in November 2024. In June 2025, they announced Doute had given birth to a daughter named Kaia.

== Filmography ==
Film and television
| Year | Title | Role | Notes |
|---|---|---|---|
| 2010 | The Loneliness of the Long Distance Dreamer | Tripping Bikini Girl | Short film |
| 2011 | Behind Your Eyes | Katie Richter | |
| 2011–2013 | The Real Housewives of Beverly Hills | Herself | 4 episodes |
| 2012 | 23 Minutes to Sunrise | Grace | |
| 2013 | Blood on Canvas | Emma | |
| 2013 | Cha Cha Diva | Show Girl | |
| 2013–2020; 2023 | Vanderpump Rules | Herself | Main cast: seasons 1-8; guest: season 10; 167 episodes |
| 2015 | L.A. Femmes Fatale(s) | Scarlet | |
| 2016 | Donnie Baker's World | Candice | Short film |
| 2017 | Summer House | Herself | Episode: "Summer House" |
| 2017 | Hollywood Medium | Herself | Episode: "Stassi Schroeder & Kristen Doute/Johnny Weir/Nancy Grace" |
| 2018 | LadyGang | Herself | Episode: "I Woke Up Like This... Single" |
| 2019 | Ex-Housewife | Herself | Episode: "Episode #1.2" |
| 2024 | The Goat | Herself | Contestant on season 1; 4 episodes |
| 2024–present | The Valley | Herself | Main cast; 41 episodes |

== Bibliography ==
- Doute, Kristen (with Michele Alexander). He's Making You Crazy. Chicago: Chicago Review Press, June 2020.
