= Vanderpump Villa =

American reality TV series

- Genre: Reality television
- Starring: Lisa Vanderpump; Stassi Schroeder; Stephen Alsvig; Anthony Bar; Marciano Brunette; Caroline Byl; Grace Cottrell; Priscila Ferrari; Hannah Fouch; Eric Funderwhite; Telly Hall; Emily Kovacs; Nikki Millman; Andre Mitchell; Gabriella Sanon; Tyler Agajan; Ashley Angel; Hagen Bach; Lexee Berdiago; Dominic DeAngelis; Tyler Grawn; Alyssa Johnston; Bridget Keefe; Aidan McHugh; Siadi; Sianna Renee; Sher Suarez; Sam Terry
- Country of origin: United States
- Original language: English
- No. of seasons: 3
- No. of episodes: 33

Production
- Executive producers: Lisa Vanderpump; Julie Pizzi; Erica Ross; Jacob Lane; Michael Beck; Jenna Moshell Rosenfeld
- Producers: Michael J. Driscoll; Diane Perrotta
- Production locations: Château St. Joseph, Mazerolles-du-Razès, France; Orvieto, Umbria, Italy; Tyringham Hall, Tyringham, United Kingdom; Salzburg, Austria
- Production companies: Bunim/Murray Productions; Entertainment 360; Villa Rosa Productions

Original release
- Network: Hulu
- Release: April 1, 2024 – present

Related
- Vanderpump Rules; Vanderpump Rules After Show; Vanderpump Rules: Jax & Brittany Take Kentucky; The Real Housewives of Beverly Hills; Vanderpump Dogs; The Valley

Vanderpump Villa is an American reality television series starring Lisa Vanderpump. The show focuses on the personal lives of Vanderpump's staff and premiered on the streaming service Hulu on April 1, 2024.

== Cast ==
Cast member	Role	Seasons		
Cast member	Role	1	2	3
Lisa Vanderpump	British businesswoman and restaurateur	Main	Main	Main
Ken Todd	Lisa's husband	Main	Main	Main
Anthony Bar	Executive chef	Main	Main	Main
Gabriella Sanon	Events coordinator	Main	Main	Main
Hannah Fouch	Server	Main	Main	Main
Marciano Brunette	Lead server (season 1); Server	Main	Main	Main
Grace Cottrell	Housekeeper	Main	Main	
Andre Mitchell	Bartender	Main	Main	
Stephen Alsvig	Events coordinator	Main		
Caroline Byl	Sous chef	Main		
Priscila Ferrari	Server	Main		
Eric Funderwhite	Chateau manager	Main		
Telly Hall	Mixologist	Main		
Emily Kovacs	Housekeeper	Main		
Nikki Millman	Server	Main		
Hagen Bach	Housekeeper/butler		Main	Main
Marciano Brunette	Server		Main	Main
Dominic DeAngelis	Cook		Main	Main
Alyssa Johnston	Server		Main	Main
Stassi Schroeder	Special VIP		Main	Main
Sher Suarez	Server		Main	Main
Sam Terry	Bartender		Main	Main
Tyler Agajan	Events coordinator		Main	
Ashley Angel	Cook		Main	
Lexee Berdiago	Bartender		Main	
Beau Clark	Stassi's husband		Main	
Tyler "TJ" Grawn	Server		Main	
Bridget Keefe	Sous chef		Main	
Aidan McHugh	Server		Main	
Andre Mitchell	Bartender		Main	
Sianna Renee	Events coordinator		Main	
Siadi	Guest services		Main	
Mike Catuosco	Cook			Main
Keviah Healy	Server			Main
Lewis Herring	Server			Main
J.J. Jolaoso	Cook			Main
Nicholas "Nick" King	Bartender			Main
Merredith Lambert	Bartender			Main
Sage Smith	Housekeeper			Main
Charlie Tiedemann	Bartender			Main
Adair Werley	Housekeeper			Main
Tyler Winston	Events coordinator			Main

== Episodes ==
=== Series overview ===
Season	Episodes	Originally released	
Season	Episodes	First released	Last released
1	11	April 1, 2024	May 20, 2024
2	11	April 24, 2025	May 8, 2025
3	11	April 16, 2026	April 30, 2026

=== Season 1 (2024) ===
Location: Chateau Rosabelle, France

No. overall	No. in season	Title	Original release date
1	1	"Welcome to Chateau Rosabelle"	April 1, 2024
2	2	"No Room For Error"	April 1, 2024
3	3	"From One Queen to Another"	April 8, 2024
4	4	"A Naughty Night in Versailles"	April 8, 2024
5	5	"Revenge of Les Dames"	April 15, 2024
6	6	"An Unforgettable Night in Carcassonne"	April 22, 2024
7	7	"A Divorce Party"	April 29, 2024
8	8	"Love, Death, and Beyond"	May 6, 2024
9	9	"Reunited and It Feels So Good"	May 13, 2024
10	10	"Bon Voyage, Bollywood Style"	May 20, 2024
11	11	"The Reunion"	May 20, 2024

=== Season 2 (2025) ===
Location: Castello Rosato, Italy

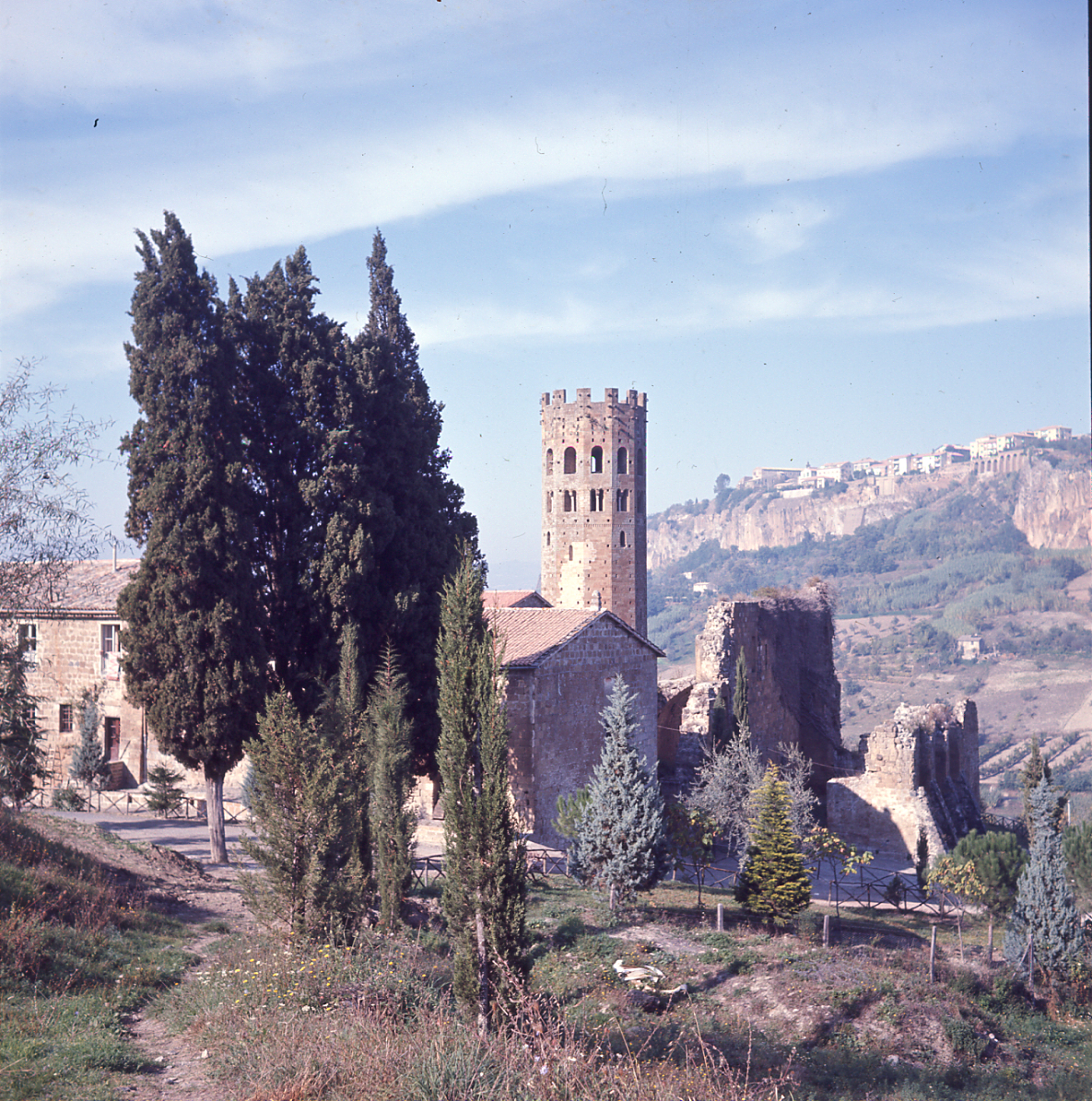
"Castello Rosato", La Badia Di Orvieto, Italy

No. overall	No. in season	Title	Original release date
12	1	"New Staff, New Secrets...New Stassi"	April 24, 2025
13	2	"Gold Medal Drama"	April 24, 2025
14	3	"Momtoks and Mormons, Oh My!"	April 24, 2025
15	4	"Fireworks and Falling Apart"	April 24, 2025
16	5	"Castello Catastrophe"	April 24, 2025
17	6	"Brewing and Boiling Over"	April 24, 2025
18	7	"Stassi's Birthday Meltdown"	April 24, 2025
19	8	"The Haunted Castle"	April 24, 2025
20	9	"Who Is This Guy?"	April 24, 2025
21	10	"A Surprising Twist"	April 24, 2025
22	11	"The Reunion"	May 8, 2025

=== Season 3 (2026) ===
Location: Rosecroft Park, Tyringham near Newport Pagnell, England

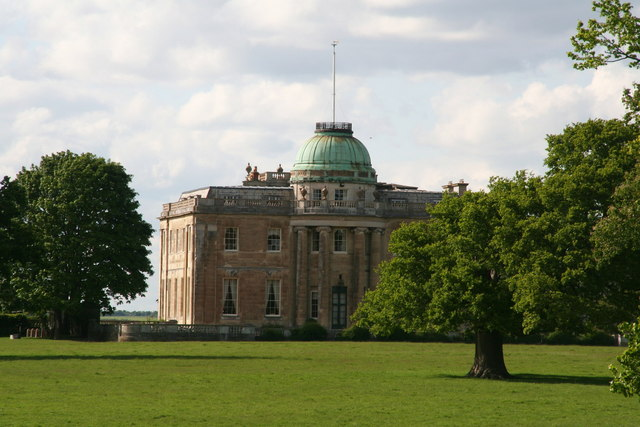
Tyringham Hall

No. overall	No. in season	Title	Original release date
23	1	"The Butler Did It"	April 16, 2026
24	2	"Delulu Is the Solulu"	April 16, 2026
25	3	"Horniest Boat Ride Eve"	April 16, 2026
26	4	"Up for the Challenge"	April 16, 2026
27	5	"Rosecroft at War"	April 16, 2026
28	6	"Most Dramatic Rose(croft) Ceremony Ever"	April 16, 2026
29	7	"Crossing Jordan"	April 16, 2026
30	8	"The Secret Lives of #DadTok"	April 16, 2026
31	9	"Kitchen Nightmares"	April 16, 2026
32	10	"Rocking the Boat"	April 16, 2026
33	11	"The Reunion"	April 30, 2026
