= Vanderpump Rules season 11 =

Vanderpump Rules
- Season 11
- Promotional poster via Peacock
- Starring: Lisa Vanderpump; Scheana Shay; Tom Sandoval; Katie Maloney; Ariana Madix; Tom Schwartz; James Kennedy; Lala Kent
- No. of episodes: 19

Release
- Original network: Bravo
- Original release: January 30 – May 29, 2024

Additional information
- Filming dates: June 28 – September 1, 2023

Season chronology
- ← Previous; Season 10 Next → Season 12

The eleventh season of Vanderpump Rules, an American reality television series, is broadcast on Bravo. It aired from January 30, 2024, until May 29, 2024. The season was primarily filmed in West Hollywood, California from June to September 2023. Additional footage was filmed in Lake Tahoe, Las Vegas, Nevada, and San Francisco.

The season focuses on the personal and professional lives of Katie Maloney, Tom Sandoval, Scheana Shay, Ariana Madix, Tom Schwartz, James Kennedy and Lala Kent, along with Lisa Vanderpump.

The season's executive producers are Alex Baskin, Jen McClure-Metz, Natalie Neurauter, Douglas Ross, Jeremiah Smith, Ken Todd and Lisa Vanderpump.

This marked the final regular appearances of Scheana Shay, Tom Sandoval, Katie Maloney, Ariana Madix, Tom Schwartz, James Kennedy and Lala Kent.

== Cast and synopsis ==
In August 2023, it was confirmed that Raquel Leviss would not return after appearing on six seasons of the show, following the "Scandoval" drama.

In October 2023, it was confirmed that all other main cast members would return, in addition to Ally Lewber remaining and Brock Davies in a recurring role. Former cast members Brittany Cartwright, Jax Taylor, and Dayna Kathan made guest appearances during the season.

== Episodes ==
No. overall	No. in season	Title	Original release date	US viewers (millions)
—	—	"A Decade of Rumors and Lies"	December 12, 2023	0.34
206	1	"Notes on a Scandal"	January 30, 2024	1.39
207	2	"The Ultimate Betrayal"	February 6, 2024	1.09
208	3	"You're Not the Queen of the Group"	February 13, 2024	0.96
209	4	"Dog Days of Summer"	February 20, 2024	0.97
210	5	"Lake It or Break It"	February 27, 2024	0.93
211	6	"Saw It on the Graham"	March 5, 2024	0.93
212	7	"Written in the Stars"	March 12, 2024	0.93
213	8	"Peaks and Valleys"	March 19, 2024	0.99
214	9	"Kiss Kiss, Revenge Bang"	March 26, 2024	0.96
215	10	"Line in the Sand"	April 2, 2024	0.95
216	11	"May the Best Woman Win"	April 9, 2024	0.98
217	12	"How'd You Like Them Apples?"	April 16, 2024	0.92
218	13	"Jax Attack"	April 23, 2024	0.92
219	14	"For Old Tom's Sake"	April 30, 2024	0.86
220	15	"Plot Twist"	May 7, 2024	1.02
221	16	"Reunion Part 1"	May 14, 2024	1.02
222	17	"Reunion Part 2"	May 21, 2024	0.99
223	18	"Reunion Part 3"	May 28, 2024	1.05
224	19	"Secrets Revealed"	May 29, 2024 (Note: Season 11, Episode 19 was released exclusively on Peacock and did not air on Bravo.)	N/A
