= Nia Sanchez =

American beauty pageant titleholder (born 1990)

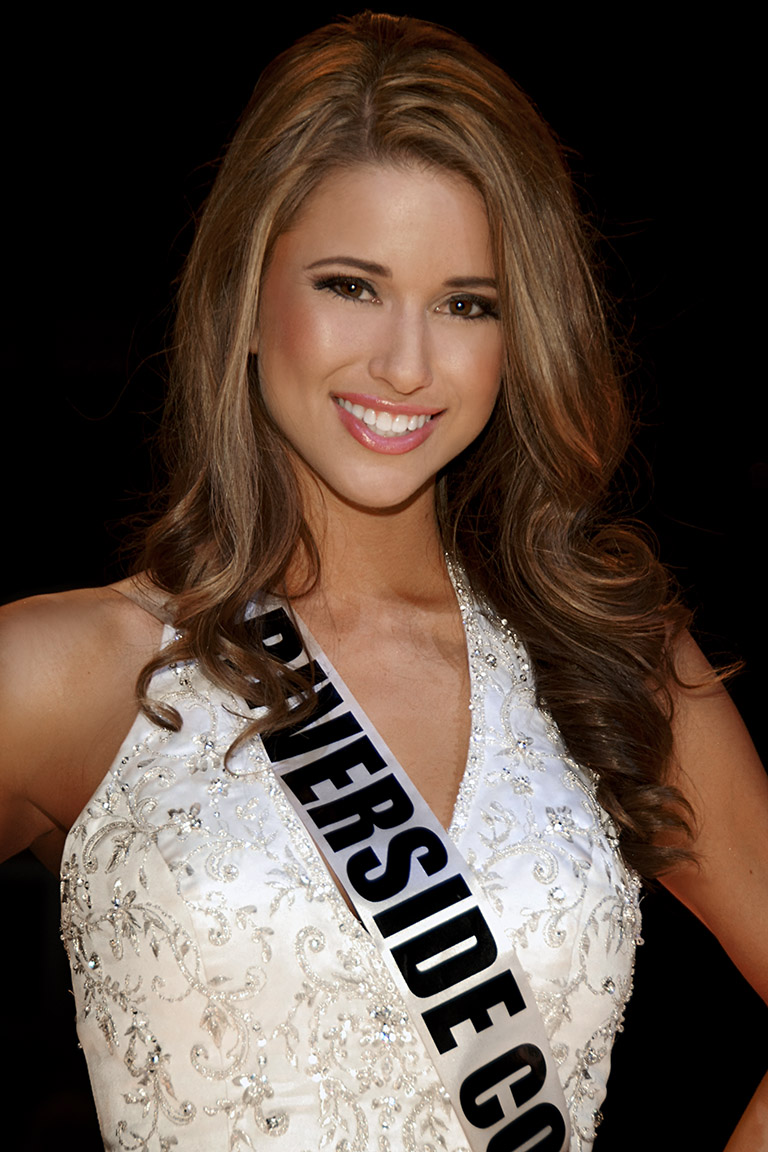
- Sanchez in 2010
- Born: Nia Temple Sanchez; February 15, 1990 (age 36); Sacramento, California, U.S.
- Spouse: Daniel Booko (m. 2015)
- Children: 4
- Beauty pageant titleholder
- Title: Miss Nevada USA 2014; Miss USA 2014
- Major competitions: Miss Nevada USA 2014; (Winner); Miss USA 2014; (Winner); Miss Universe 2014; (1st Runner-Up)

Nia Temple Booko (née Sanchez; born February 15, 1990) is an American reality television personality and former beauty pageant titleholder who won Miss USA 2014. Sanchez represented the United States at Miss Universe 2014, where she was the first runner-up.

From 2024 to 2026, she appeared in the Bravo reality television series The Valley, a spinoff of Vanderpump Rules.

== Early life ==
Nia Temple Sanchez was born in Sacramento, California on February 15, 1990, to David Sanchez, and Nicole Sanford. Her paternal grandfather, Wilbur Sanchez, is an American of Mexican descent and her paternal grandmother is German, while her mother is of Spanish, English, and other European heritage. Her parents divorced when she was six. When she was eight, she and her brother moved to Menifee, California with their father, and she went on to graduate from Paloma Valley High School in 2008.

== Career ==
=== 2003–2017: Pageantry ===
Her first beauty pageant was the Miss San Jacinto Valley, when she was 13. At 19, she won Miss Citrus Valley USA, which qualified her for Miss Turismo Latino in Ecuador in 2009.

==== Miss California USA ====
Sanchez was second runner-up at Miss California USA 2010 (as Miss Citrus Valley USA), against 132 contestants. Sanchez has also competed in and won Miss Riverside County USA 2011 and Miss Hollywood USA 2012.

==== Miss Nevada USA ====
As Miss South Las Vegas USA, Sanchez won Miss Nevada USA on January 12, 2014, at Artemus W. Ham Concert Hall at the University of Nevada, Las Vegas.

==== Miss USA 2014 ====
Sanchez won Miss USA 2014 in Baton Rouge, Louisiana, on June 8, 2014, representing Nevada. She was crowned by the outgoing titleholder Erin Brady of Connecticut. During the final question portion of the competition, she was asked by judge Rumer Willis about the high rate of sexual assault among undergraduate women to which she replied that it is important to be able to defend yourself.

==== Miss Universe 2014 ====
Sanchez represented the United States at Miss Universe 2014 on January 25, 2015, at the U.S. Century Bank Arena at Florida International University in Doral, Miami, Florida and was first runner-up to Paulina Vega of Colombia. Her national costume was a Vegas showgirl.

=== 2018–present: Media roles ===
Sanchez hosted the documentary film Budget or Baller (2018) and co-hosted Miss Teen USA 2019 with Tim Tialdo.

In January 2024, she launched a podcast called Hold My Crown with Nia Sanchez. On March 19, 2024, she began appearing in Bravo's reality television series The Valley (2024), a spin-off of Vanderpump Rules. The series follows the lives of five couples as they navigate parenthood, family, businesses and relationships. In May 2024, The Valley was renewed for a second season, with the entire cast returning.

== Personal life ==
Sanchez is a fifth-degree black belt in taekwondo, which she began practicing when she was 8 years old. She was the first Miss USA ever featured on the cover of Tae Kwon Do Times. She also studied jazz and ballet for five years. After her high school graduation she spent time working as a nanny in Europe, and spent three months serving on a mission in Mexico. She acted in the roles of various Disney princess characters at Hong Kong Disneyland where she worked for seven months in 2012.

Sanchez married actor Daniel Booko on October 17, 2015, in Temecula, California. She and Booko have four children, a son and three daughters together, including one set of identical twins.

== Filmography ==
Film and television
Year	Title	Role	Notes
2014	Miss USA	Herself	Contestant as Miss Nevada 2014 Winner as Miss USA 2014
2015	Miss Universe 2014	Herself	Contestant as Miss USA 2014; 1st runner-up
2016	Say Yes to the Dress	Herself	Season 14 Episode 21
2018	Budget or Baller	Herself	Documentary; Host
2019	Miss Teen USA 2019	Herself	Television special; Co-host
2024–2026	The Valley	Herself	Main cast; 30 episodes

Podcasts
Year	Title	Role	Notes
2024–present	Hold My Crown with Nia Sanchez	Host	65 episodes as of September 28, 2025

Awards and achievements
Preceded by Patricia Rodríguez	Miss Universe 1st Runner-Up; 2014	Succeeded by Ariadna Gutierrez
Preceded by Erin Brady (Connecticut)	Miss USA; 2014	Succeeded by Olivia Jordan (Oklahoma)
Preceded by Chelsea Caswell	Miss Nevada USA; 2014	Succeeded by Brittany McGowan
