= The Valley (TV series) =

- Genre: Reality television
- Starring: Brittany Cartwright; Jax Taylor; Kristen Doute; Luke Broderick; Danny Booko; Nia Booko; Jesse Lally; Michelle Saniei; Jasmine Goode; Zack Wickham; Janet Caperna; Jason Caperna; Lala Kent; Tom Schwartz
- Country of origin: United States
- Original language: English
- No. of seasons: 3
- No. of episodes: 51

Production
- Executive producers: Alex Baskin; Jeremiah Smith; Keith Burke; Jessica Chesler; Lucilla D'Agostino; Jeff Festa; Josh Halpert; Chaz Morgan; Barry Poznick; Ryan Revel; Aaron Rothman; Anne Swan; Lisa Vanderpump
- Production locations: San Fernando Valley, California
- Production companies: 32 Flavors Entertainment; Haymaker East; Evolution Media

Original release
- Network: Bravo
- Release: March 19, 2024 – present

Related
- Vanderpump Rules; Vanderpump Rules After Show; Vanderpump Rules: Jax & Brittany Take Kentucky; The Valley: Persian Style

The Valley is an American reality television series which premiered on Bravo on March 19, 2024. Developed as a spin-off from Vanderpump Rules, the series follows five couples who are "taking a shot at adulting."

== Overview ==
The Valley was first announced by Bravo on January 17, 2024, during the premiere party for the 11th season of Vanderpump Rules. Lisa Vanderpump serves as an executive producer, with 32 Flavors Entertainment, Haymaker East and Evolution Media attached as the production companies.

The series is the fourth spin-off from Vanderpump Rules; the eighth episode in the 11th season serves as a cross-over preview to The Valley.

=== Season 1 ===
Filming for the first season started in July and concluded on September 16, 2023. Cameras went back up in March 2024 following the news of Jax and Brittany's separation.

The full cast for the first season was announced and a teaser for the season was released on January 17, 2024. An extended first look was released on February 27 and the premiere date was announced as March 19, 2024.

The first season premiered on Bravo on March 19 and the series was broadcast through June 4, 2024. The original cast consist of: Brittany Cartwright, Jax Taylor, Kristen Doute, Luke Broderick, Danny Booko, Nia Booko, Janet Caperna, Jason Caperna, Jesse and Michelle Lally. Jasmine Goode and Zack Wickham joined the cast in a recurring capacity. Tom Schwartz made a guest appearance.

=== Season 2 ===
In May 2024, the series was renewed for a second season, with the entire cast from the first season returning. Bravo then posted a teaser trailer for the season on Instagram in February 2025. The second season premiered on April 15, 2025, and concluded on August 12, 2025. Jasmine Goode and Zack Wickham were upgraded to a full-time capacity. Melissa Carelli, Aaron Nosler and Benji Quach joined the series as recurring cast members. Scheana Shay, Brock Davies, Lala Kent and Tom Schwartz made guest appearances. The reunion was taped on May 2, 2025. In July 2025, Jax Taylor announced that he would not be returning for the third season in order to focus on his sobriety, mental health, and coparenting.

=== Season 3 ===
On November 14, 2025, it was announced at BravoCon that Lala Kent and Tom Schwartz would be joining the cast in a full-time capacity.

The majority of the cast returned for the third season, with the exception of Jax Taylor and Aaron Nosler, alongside Kent and Schwartz. Lacy Nicole joined the cast in a friend capacity. The third season premiered on April 1, 2026, and concluded on August 19, 2026. The reunion was taped on June 18, 2026. In mid-July 2026, cameras went back up after Jax Taylor was photographed with his and Cartwright's publicist, Lori Krebs. Cartwright dropped Krebs as her publicist upon the photos' release.

=== Season 4 ===
On September 1, 2026, Booko and Sanchez announced in a joint statement, that they would be leaving the series after three seasons. On November 20, 2026, Doute revealed in an interview with Page Six that her fiancé, Luke Broderick, would not be returning for the fourth season in order to focus on their family and his mental health.

== Cast ==
=== Cast timeline ===
Cast member	Seasons		
Cast member	1	2	3
Daniel Booko	Main	Main	Main
Luke Broderick	Main	Main	Main
Janet Caperna	Main	Main	Main
Jason Caperna	Main	Main	Main
Brittany Cartwright	Main	Main	Main
Kristen Doute	Main	Main	Main
Jesse Lally	Main	Main	Main
Nia Sanchez	Main	Main	Main
Michelle Saniei	Main	Main	Main
Jax Taylor	Main	Main	
Jasmine Goode	Recurring	Main	Main
Zack Wickham	Recurring	Main	Main
Lala Kent	Guest	Guest	Main
Tom Schwartz	Guest	Guest	Main
Recurring Cast Members
Melissa Carelli	Guest	Recurring	Recurring
Aaron Nosler		Recurring	
Benji Quach		Recurring	Recurring
Lacy Nicole		Guest	Recurring

== Episodes ==
=== Series overview ===
Season	Episodes	Originally released		Average Viewers
Season	Episodes	First released	Last released	Average Viewers
1	12	March 19, 2024	June 4, 2024	0.65
2	18	April 15, 2025	August 12, 2025	0.41
3	21	April 1, 2026	August 19, 2026	0.53

=== Season 1 (2024) ===
No. overall	No. in season	Title	Original release date	U.S. viewers (millions)
1	1	"Welcome to the Valley"	March 19, 2024	0.78
Brittany throws Janet a county fair themed party at her house.
2	2	"Tit for Tat"	March 26, 2024	0.53
Jax upsets Kristen and Luke when he invites Kristen's ex boyfriend Alex to a guys night Luke is at.
3	3	"Doubting Doute"	April 2, 2024	0.72
Everyone turns against Kristen for the accusations she spread about Michelle during Girl's Night. Jesse and Michelle discover how fractured their relationship really is. Janet and Jason stress about not feeling prepared for their new baby.
4	4	"Capri Chaos"	April 9, 2024	0.63
5	5	"The 'D' Word"	April 16, 2024	0.61
6	6	"Congrats on Your Hair Loss"	April 23, 2024	0.63
7	7	"The #1 Gossip of the Group"	April 30, 2024	0.60
8	8	"The Invite Fight"	May 7, 2024	0.70
9	9	"The Big Bear Bombshell"	May 14, 2024	0.65
10	10	"Babymoon Mayhem"	May 21, 2024	0.67
11	11	"Darkside Danny"	May 28, 2024	0.64
12	12	"Opening Bars, Closing Chapters"	June 4, 2024	0.67

=== Season 2 (2025) ===
No. overall	No. in season	Title	Original release date	U.S. viewers (millions)
13	1	"Separation Anxiety"	April 15, 2025	0.49
Jax and Brittany deal with the aftermath of their big blowup fight over Brittany sleeping with Jax' friend Julian.
14	2	"Checking In"	April 22, 2025	0.42
15	3	"The Billionaire and the Boys' Chat"	April 29, 2025	0.39
16	4	"The Circle of Strife"	May 6, 2025	0.39
17	5	"Grapes of Wrath"	May 13, 2025	0.43
18	6	"Behind Closed Pantry Doors"	May 20, 2025	0.38
19	7	"Ring Around the Rumor"	May 27, 2025	0.40
20	8	"The Biggest Snake in the Grass"	June 3, 2025	0.38
21	9	"When One Door Forecloses"	June 10, 2025	0.37
22	10	"You've Been Served"	June 17, 2025	0.42
23	11	"El Coyote Ugly"	June 24, 2025	0.36
24	12	"Will You Maui Me?"	July 1, 2025	0.39
25	13	"The Cruise From Hell"	July 8, 2025	0.40
26	14	"Making Up Is Hard to Do"	July 15, 2025	0.45
27	15	"There's No Zen in Resentment"	July 22, 2025	0.45
28	16	"Reunion Part 1"	July 29, 2025	0.43
29	17	"Reunion Part 2"	August 5, 2025	0.44
30	18	"Reunion Part 3"	August 12, 2025	0.49

=== Season 3 (2026) ===
No. overall	No. in season	Title	Original release date	U.S. viewers (millions)
31	1	"You Can't Sip With Us"	April 1, 2026	0.49
32	2	"Snip Snip"	April 8, 2026	0.49
33	3	"The Santa Clarita Trail"	April 15, 2026	0.48
34	4	"Mariposa Momma"	April 22, 2026	0.46
35	5	"The Hive Mentality"	April 29, 2026	0.49
36	6	"All Aboard!"	May 6, 2026	0.43
37	7	"Triggers and Tiaras"	May 13, 2026	0.46
38	8	"Miss Behavior"	May 20, 2026	0.54
39	9	"'Til Debt Do Us Part"	May 27, 2026	0.61
40	10	"Red Flags and White Claws"	June 3, 2026	0.51
41	11	"Friendships Shaken, Not Stirred"	June 10, 2026	0.48
42	12	"Schwartzapalooza"	June 17, 2026	0.54
43	13	"Liked and Loaded"	June 24, 2026	0.50
44	14	"Hips Don't Lie"	July 1, 2026	0.49
45	15	"It's My Birthday & I'll Cry if I Want To"	July 8, 2026	0.59
46	16	"Balls Voyage"	July 15, 2026	0.54
47	17	"Guilt Tripping"	July 22, 2026	0.59
48	18	"The Valley of the Damned"	July 29, 2026	0.70
49	19	"Reunion Part 1"	August 5, 2026	0.58
50	20	"Reunion Part 2"	August 12, 2026	0.63
51	21	"Reunion Part 3"	August 19, 2026	0.53

== Reception ==
The Valley's first episode was Bravo's most watched series premiere in nearly ten years. The season premiere gathered 2.8 million viewers in seven days.
