= Stassi Schroeder =

American television personality, model, and journalist

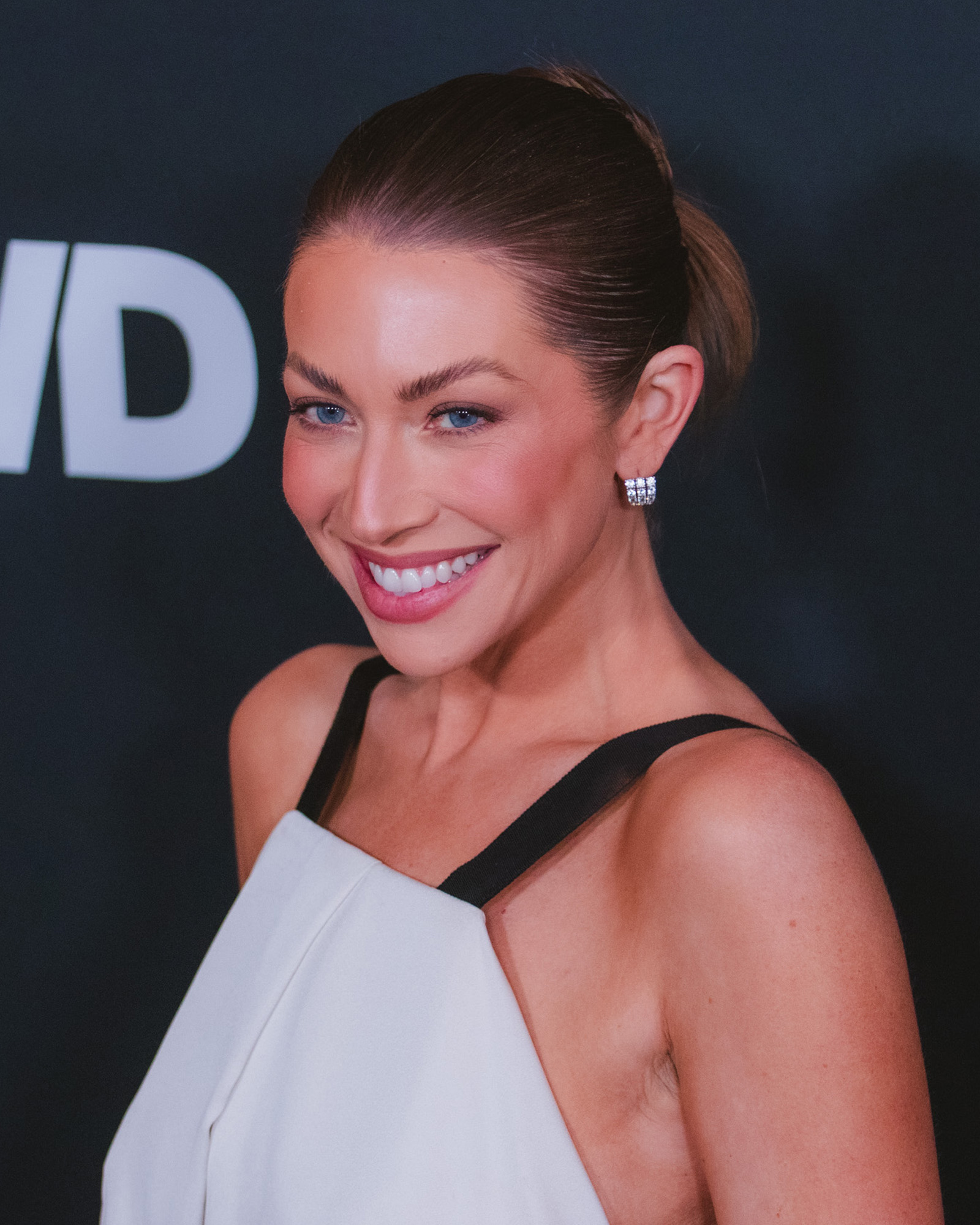
- Schroeder in 2026
- Born: Nastassia Bianca Schroeder; June 24, 1988 (age 38); New Orleans, Louisiana, U.S.
- Other name: Stassi Schroeder Clark
- Education: Loyola Marymount University (B.A.)
- Occupations: Television personality, model, author
- Years active: 2005–present
- Spouse: Beau Clark (m. 2020)
- Children: 2
- Website: www.stassischroeder.com

Nastassia Bianca "Stassi" Schroeder Clark (née Schroeder; born June 24, 1988) is an American television personality, podcast host, fashion blogger, model and author. She is best known for appearing on Bravo's reality television series Vanderpump Rules (2013–2020) for eight seasons. Schroeder has written three books, which were all New York Times best sellers.

== Early life ==
Nastassia Bianca Schroeder was born on June 24, 1988, in New Orleans to architect father, Mark, and jewelry designer (Georgi Jules Jewelry) mother, Dayna. She has two younger brothers, Hunter and Nikolai, and a younger sister, Georgianna. When Schroeder was 11, she began taking theater classes at her local high school, Mount Carmel Academy, appearing in productions of Into the Woods, Once Upon a Mattress (Minstrel), and Gypsy (Louise). When she turned 18, Schroeder moved to Hollywood and attended Loyola Marymount University, where she received a bachelor's degree in English writing.

== Career ==
=== Television ===
In 2005, Schroeder appeared as a contestant on season 8 of the reality game show The Amazing Race, alongside her father Mark, stepmother Char, and brother Hunter; the family came in 7th place of 10 teams. After the filming of the show, the Schroeders' house was flooded and destroyed by Hurricane Katrina. They stayed with another family from the show while they rebuilt their house. While going to school in 2008, she was on the television series Queen Bees.

In 2010, Schroeder started working at Lisa Vanderpump's restaurants SUR and Villa Blanca, which earned her a spot on the reality television series Vanderpump Rules. The series follows Vanderpump's employees, as they work on building their futures and become entangled in interpersonal drama. Schroeder was a main cast member for Seasons 1–3 and 5–8 of Vanderpump Rules, appearing in a recurring role for Season 4 before her departure from the show.

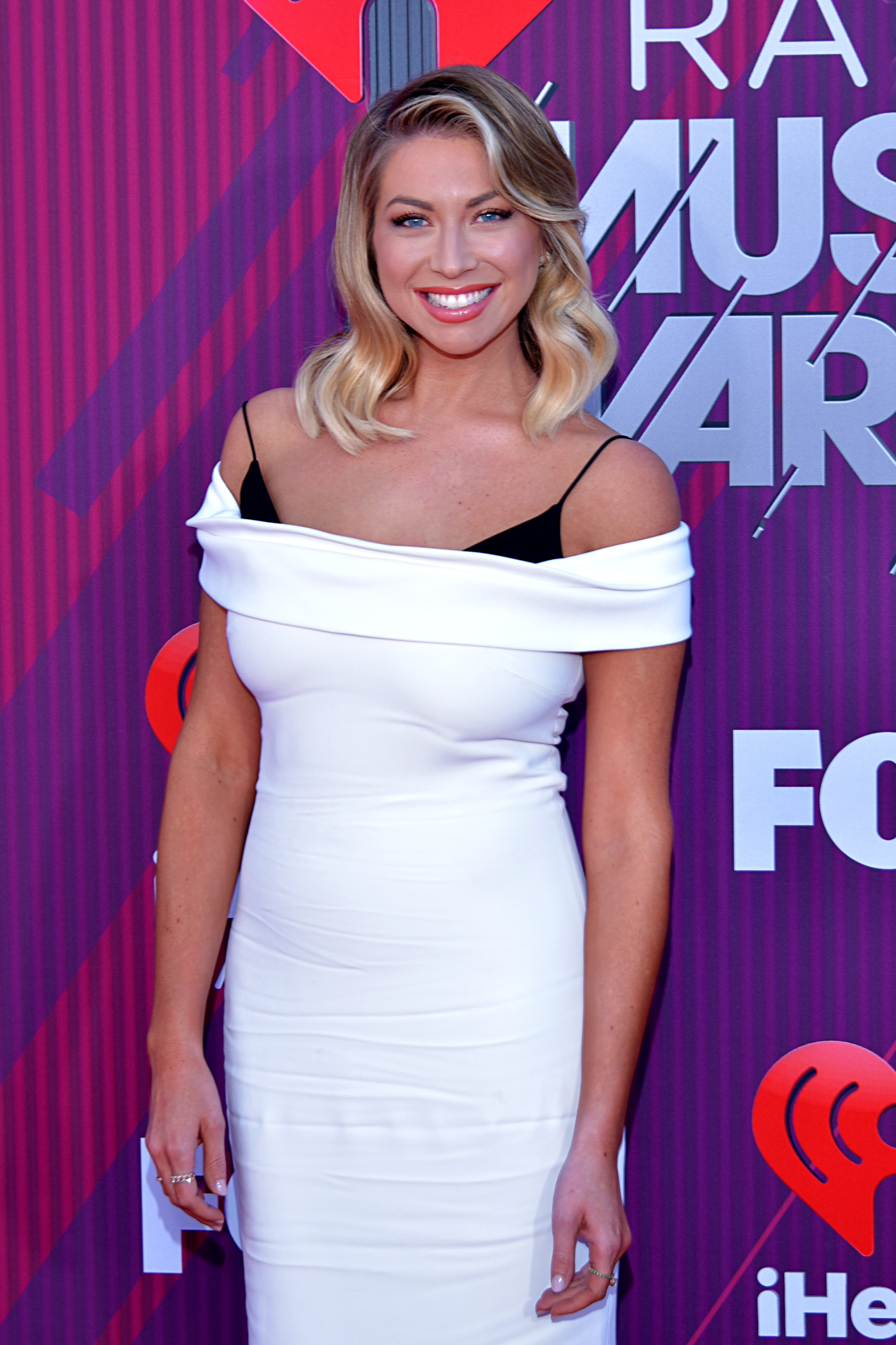
Schroeder in 2019

In 2016, Schroeder portrayed Koening in the television film Sharknado: The 4th Awakens. She has also appeared in three episodes of Bravo's reality television series Summer House between 2017 and 2019. In November 2019, Schroeder started a digital series called Basically Stassi, with Beau Clark. The series was released online on Bravo's website and YouTube channel. The show followed Schroeder and her guests at her apartment in Los Angeles while playing games and discussing various topics such as relationships, love and life.

On August 9, 2024, Variety announced that Schroeder signed a deal with Hulu for her own comedic docuseries called Stassi Says. Schroeder also joined the cast of the second season of Vanderpump Villa. In November 2025, she was announced as the host for The Secret Lives of Mormon Wives season three reunion. The reunion special was released on December 4, 2025.

==== House of Stassi ====
July 20, 2026, People announced that Schroeder would star in a new reality television series titled "House of Stassi". The first two episodes premiered on Freeform July 29th, 2026. The full eight episode season becoming available on Hulu/Disney+ July 30th. The show became available in the UK on August 12th, 2026. According to The Hollywood Reporter, " It quickly shot to the No. 1 spot on the streamer’s TV chart, alongside a No. 2 debut across TV and film; House of Stassi has remained in the top six spots on Hulu’s daily TV ranking over its first week of release."

=== Fashion ===
Schroeder worked as a model for several years, appearing in magazines like Italian Vanity Fair, 944, Glamour, Genlux, and Us Weekly. She has graced the covers of numerous magazines, including Millennium, Cliché and Pacific. Schroeder introduced a capsule collection with accessories e-retailer ShopPrimadonna.com which officially launched in December 2014. She released a clothing line in collaboration with JustFab in July 2019. The collection has two parts: "Next Level Basics" and "#OOTN (Outfit of the Night)".

Schroeder has received noteworthy praise for her style from periodicals such as People magazine, who described Schroeder as "the most fashion-focused of all her castmates" on Vanderpump Rules.

List of fashion and beauty collections by Stassi Schroeder
Year	Title	Brand	Notes
2014	Stassi x Shop Prima Donna	Shop Prima Donna	Jewelry collection
2019	Stassi Schroeder x JustFab Outfit of the Day Collection	JustFab	Her clothing line had two parts: "Next Level Basics" for daytime wear and "#OOTN (Outfit of the Night)" for evening wear.

=== Writing ===
Schroeder worked as a style critic writing for Vanderpump's daughter's website, The Divine Addiction. Her book Next Level Basic: The Definitive Basic Bitch Handbook was released on April 16, 2019, by Gallery Books. The book was third on the New York Times Best Seller list. The book is a humorous celebration of her most basic tendencies and a defense of the basic culture. In the book, Schroeder lists her favorite beauty products, a guide to the best Ranch dressings, tips on how to look good on social media and a graph indicating how psycho you are based on the charge of your phone. She wrote a wedding column titled "Basic Bride" for Glamour magazine for three months in 2020.

Schroeder's second book, also a New York Times Bestseller, titled Off with My Head: The Definitive Basic B*tch Handbook to Surviving Rock Bottom was published on April 26, 2022, by Gallery Books.

=== Other ventures ===
Schroeder is popular on social media and endorses products such as beauty and wellness products on Instagram.

On February 1, 2019, Schroeder, Kristen Doute and Katie Maloney-Schwartz launched a wine in partnership with Nocking Point Wines called "Basic Witch Potion No. 1". Their second collaboration with Nocking Point Wines, "Basic Witch Potion No. 2" Rosé was launched on June 1, 2019. In June 2020, "Basic Witch Potion No.1" and "Basic Witch Potion No.2" were removed from Nocking Point Wines' store following the firings of Doute and Schroeder. In 2015, she launched a podcast titled Straight Up with Stassi, which she hosted weekly for five years. Schroeder announced that she is doing "Straight Up With Stassi LIVE" podcast tour in four cities in September 2019.

In March 2021, Schroeder announced her new venture with husband Beau Clark, a Patreon-hosted parenting podcast entitled The Good The Bad The Baby.

In September 2022, Schroeder relaunched Straight Up With Stassi. Schroeder announced in March 2023 that she is doing Straight Up With Stassi LIVE – The Mommy Dearest Tour in an initial eleven cities throughout April and May 2023. She embarked on the tour with husband, Beau Clark, and friend Taylor Strecker. The tour was later expanded to last through June.

== Personal life ==
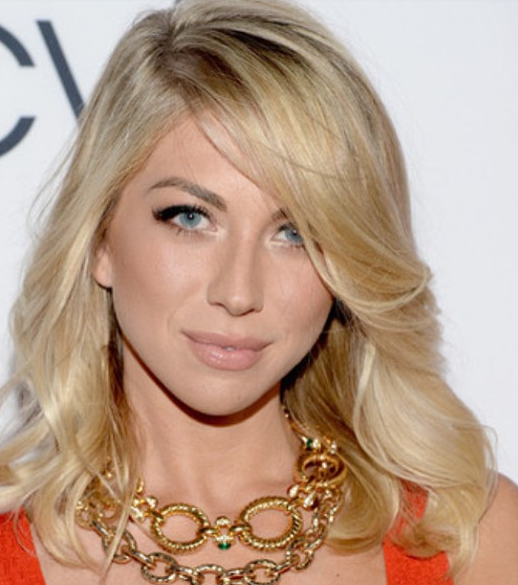
Schroeder in 2014

After two years of dating, in July 2019, Schroeder became engaged to casting agent Beau Clark. Their engagement photos were published exclusively in People magazine in October 2019. They got married in a small ceremony in September 2020. Their daughter, Hartford Charlie Rose, was born January 7, 2021. In early 2023, Schroeder announced that she and Clark were expecting their second child later that year. Their son, Messer Rhys, was born on September 7, 2023.

Schroeder has publicly spoken about her psoriasis.

Schroeder has a fascination with esoterica such as tarot cards and astrology. She shares a birthday with her Vanderpump Rules co-star Ariana Madix (June 24), although Schroeder is three years her junior.

During the first season of Vanderpump Rules, Schroeder dated fellow cast member Jax Taylor from 2010 to 2013. In the show's premiere, she said: "Me and Jax just kind of bring everyone together. The boys are drawn to him, and the girls are drawn to me, so we just kind of lead the pack." The relationship ultimately ended after it was revealed that Taylor had cheated on Schroeder with her close friend and co-star Kristen Doute, which was a major storyline covered in Season 2. Schroeder later dated Frank Herlihy and Patrick Meagher on the show before meeting Beau Clark.

=== Controversy ===
On June 9, 2020, at the height of the Black Lives Matter movement, Schroeder and Kristen Doute were fired from the show for reporting former co-star Faith Stowers to the police for a crime she did not commit. Schroeder was criticized for publicly making racially insensitive remarks, and for insensitive remarks about the #MeToo movement. She has since stated that she hired a diversity coach.

== The Amazing Race ==
In 2005, when she was 16, Schroeder appeared with her father Mark, stepmother Char, and 14-year-old brother Hunter on the eighth season of the CBS reality show The Amazing Race, which was the family-team season. They lasted four legs and finished in 7th place.

=== The Amazing Race 8 finishes ===
- A red placement with a dagger (†) indicates that the Schroeder family were eliminated.

Roadblocks performed by Stassi are bolded

Episode	Leg	Destination(s)	Detour choice (underlined)	Roadblock performance	Placement	Notes
1	**1**	New York → New Jersey → Pennsylvania	Build It/Buggy It	No roadblock	5th of 10	
2	**2**	Pennsylvania → District of Columbia → Virginia	Heat of the battle/Heat of the night	Mark	4th of 9	
3	**3**	Virginia → South Carolina → Alabama	Forrest gump/Muddy waters	Mark & **Stassi**	3rd of 8	
4	**4**	Alabama → Mississippi → Louisiana	Work/Play	Hunter	7th of 7†	

== Filmography ==
As herself
Year	Title	Notes
2005	The Amazing Race	Season 8 contestant, 4 episodes
2008	Queen Bees	8 episodes
2012–2014	The Real Housewives of Beverly Hills	7 episodes
2013–2020	Vanderpump Rules	Main role: seasons 1–3 and 5–8, Recurring role: season 4 169 episodes
2016	Hashtaggers	Episode: "#Zoe101 with Stassi Schroeder"
2017	Hollywood Medium	Episode: "Stassi Schroeder & Kristen Doute/Johnny Weir/Nancy Grace"
2017	The Doctors	Episode: "The Doctors: Bonus Features/The Great Food Debate"
2017–2019	Summer House	3 episodes
2019	Lights Out with David Spade	Panelist and Secret Standup; 2 episodes
2019	Ex-Housewife	Episode: "Episode #1.2"
2019	Basically Stassi	Bravo digital series; 4 episodes
2024–present	Vanderpump Villa	Main cast (season 2–present)
2025	The Secret Lives of Mormon Wives	Host, "Season 3 Reunion Special"
2026	House of Stassi	Main role

As actress
Year	Title	Role	Notes
2016	Sharknado: The 4th Awakens	Koening	Television film

Podcasts
Year	Title	Role	Notes
2015–2020, 2022–2024	Straight Up with Stassi	Host	
2021–present	The Good The Bad The Baby	Co-host	
2024–2026	Stassi	Host	Dear Media
2026	Tell Me Lies Official Podcast	Host	Hulu
2026–present	Stassi with Tay	Co-host	Dear Media

== Podcast live tours ==
Live tours
Year	Title	Notes
2019	"Straight Up with Stassi Tour"	Hosted by Schroeder
2023	"Straight Up With Stassi LIVE – The Mommy Dearest Tour"	Hosted by Schroeder with special guests Beau Clark and Taylor Strecker

== Published works ==
- Schroeder, Stassi. Next Level Basic: The Definitive Basic Bitch Handbook. New York: Gallery Books, 2019.
- Schroeder, Stassi. Off with My Head: The Definitive Basic B*tch Handbook to Surviving Rock Bottom. New York: Gallery Book, 2022.
- Schroeder, Stassi. You Can't Have It All: The Basic B*tch Guide to Taking the Pressure Off. New York: Gallery Books, 2024.
