= Queen Bees (TV series) =

- Genre: Reality competition
- Starring: Yoanna House (Host); Dr. Michelle (Callahan, Co-Host); Stassi Schroeder; Gisbelle Castillo; Michelle Madonna; Shavon Booney; Kiana Jenkins; Camille Lopez
- Opening theme: "Rockstar" performed by Prima J
- Country of origin: United States
- Original language: English
- No. of seasons: 1
- No. of episodes: 8

Production
- Executive producers: James Rowley; Jenelle Lindsay
- Production locations: Los Angeles, California
- Camera setup: Multi-camera set-up
- Running time: 42 minutes
- Production companies: Endemol USA; The N Original

Original release
- Network: The N
- Release: July 11 – August 29, 2008

Queen Bees is an eight-episode reality competition series produced by Endemol USA. It aired on The N from July 11 to August 29, 2008. The show brings a group of teen "queen bees" together to live under one roof. Through a series of challenges designed to "bring out the best in them," the girls have to confront their selfish behavior and learn to treat others nicely. The show was hosted by Yoanna House. In the finale, Gisbelle became the winner and donated her winning money to the charity they visited.

== Overview ==
The concept of the show features seven young women (18 to 20) who are generally mean and rude to everyone around them. The girls spend time away from their social groups (family and friends), in a shabby house in order to make a lifetime change that includes the girls "changing" the ways they treat others. The contestants compete in different challenges, all with the intent of the girls learning a lesson about the way they treat people in their lives. The competition revolved around the "Progress Report" where the girls are evaluated on their progress by receiving "stars". The winner of the competition is decided by the girl with the most "stars" at the end of the competition.

The progress report is located in the house's "common room" where is also the site of which challenges are given to the girls. After each episode, the show's co-host (Dr. Michelle) meets the girls in the "common room" to evaluate their progress. Dr. Michelle evaluate the girls, one at a time. If the girl has made progress, she will receive a star. If the girl has reverted to their old ways, they lose a star, and if the girl does not progress, or revert, they do not gain or lose a star. On occasions, girls who make outstanding progress will receive two or three stars. At the end of each progress report, the girl with the fewest stars is "put on notice," meaning that if they do not progress by the following evaluation, they will be eliminated from the competition and forced to leave the mansion.

The mansion also features two other concepts. The room dubbed the "Secret Room," is where the girls go individually (usually one girl per episode) to see a taped message from the person that nominated them to be on the show. The other room is dubbed the "Conference Room," in which the girls will go to have a meeting with Dr. Michelle. The girls are sent to Dr. Michelle in either individual or group sessions. In the individual sessions, Dr. Michelle meets the girl in a one-on-one discussion about the girls progress. In the group sessions, all of the girls meet Dr. Michelle, in a discussion usually concerning everything that goes on between the girls in the house. In the end, the girl who earns the most stars wins $25,000.

== Progress Report ==
Every Queen Bee starts off the competition with one star. Their number of earned stars varies after each episode.

=== Week 1 ===
Queen Bee	Progress Report	Notes
Brittany Keiffer; 20; Jacksonville, Florida	+0	
Camille Lopez; 18; Trophy Club, Texas	+1	Leader
Gisbelle Castillo; 19; The Bronx, New York	+0	
Kiana Jenkins; 18; The Bronx, New York	-1	On notice
Michelle Madonna; 19; Long Island, New York	+0	
Shavon Jovi; 20; Brooklyn, New York	+1	Leader
Stassi Schroeder; 19; New Orleans, Louisiana	+0	

=== Week 2 ===
Queen Bee	Progress Report	Notes
Brittany Keiffer; 20; Jacksonville, Florida	+2	Leader
Camille Lopez; 18; Trophy Club, Texas	+0	
Gisbelle Castillo; 19; The Bronx, New York	+1	
Kiana Jenkins; 18; The Bronx, New York	+2	
Michelle Madonna; 19; Long Island, New York	+1	
Shavon Jovi; 20; Brooklyn, New York	-1	On notice
Stassi Schroder; 19; New Orleans, Louisiana	+1	

=== Week 3 ===
Queen Bee	Progress Report	Notes
Brittany Keiffer; 20; Jacksonville, Florida	+0	
Camille Lopez; 18; Trophy Club, Texas	+2	
Gisbelle Castillo; 19; The Bronx, New York	+3	Leader
Kiana Jenkins; 18; The Bronx, New York	+1	
Michelle Madonna; 19; Long Island, New York	+0	On notice
Shavon Jovi; 20; Brooklyn, New York	+2	
Stassi Schroeder; 19; New Orleans, Louisiana	+2	

=== Week 4 ===
Queen Bee	Progress Report	Notes
Brittany Keiffer; 20; Jacksonville, Florida	-1	On notice
Camille Lopez; 18; Trophy Club, Texas	+1	
Gisbelle Castillo; 19; The Bronx, New York	+1	Leader
Kiana Jenkins; 18; The Bronx, New York	+3	-1 given to Michelle; +1 regained
Michelle Madonna; 19; Long Island, New York	+2	+1 from Kiana
Shavon Jovi; 20; Brooklyn, New York	+1	
Stassi Schroeder; 19; New Orleans, Louisiana	+1	

=== Week 5 ===
Queen Bee	Progress Report	Notes
Brittany Keiffer; 20; Jacksonville, Florida	+0	Eliminated
Camille Lopez; 18; Trophy Club, Texas	+2	
Gisbelle Castillo; 19; The Bronx, New York	+2	Leader
Kiana Jenkins; 18; The Bronx, New York		
Michelle Madonna; 19; Long Island, New York	+2	
Shavon Jovi; 20; Brooklyn, New York	+1	
Stassi Schroeder; 19; New Orleans, Louisiana		

=== Week 6 ===
Queen Bee	Progress Report	Notes
Camille Lopez; 18; Trophy Club, Texas	+1	Leader
Gisbelle Castillo; 19; The Bronx, New York	+0	Leader
Kiana Jenkins; 18; The Bronx, New York	-1	On Notice
Michelle Madonna; 19; Long Island, New York	+0	
Shavon Jovi; 20; Brooklyn, New York	+0	1 regained, 1 lost
Stassi Schroeder; 19; New Orleans, Louisiana	+1	

=== Week 7 ===
Queen Bee	Progress Report	Notes
Camille Lopez; 18; Trophy Club, Texas	+0	Leader
Gisbelle Castillo; 19; The Bronx, New York	+0	Leader
Kiana Jenkins; 18; The Bronx, New York	+2	
Michelle Madonna; 19; Long Island, New York	+0	
Shavon Jovi; 20; Brooklyn, New York	+2	
Stassi Schroeder; 19; New Orleans, Louisiana	-1	

=== Week 8 - Overview ===
Queen Bee	Progress Report	Notes	Rank
Gisbelle Castillo; 19; The Bronx, New York	+3	Leader weeks 3, 4, 5, 6, 7	Winner
Camille Lopez; 18; Trophy Club, Texas	+2	Leader weeks 1, 6, 7	Second Place
Shavon Jovi; 20; Brooklyn, New York	+2	Leader week 1, On notice week 2	Third Place
Kiana Jenkins; 18; The Bronx, New York	+2	On notice weeks 1, 6	Four Place
Michelle Madonna; 19; Long Island, New York	+1	On notice week 3	Fifth Place
Stassi Schroeder; 19; New Orleans, Louisiana	+1	Sixth Place	

== Episodes ==
No.	Title	Original release date
1	"Appearance"	July 11, 2008
Seven girls are sent to Los Angeles, California by their closest friends and family in an effort to change their attitude toward their lives and the people in it. The girls are asked to prepare for a short-notice beauty pageant. It was later revealed that the judges would be three blind people. The girls attend their first group session with Dr. Michelle, and in the first Progress Report, the girls all earn one star for accepting the challenge of changing and some of the girls earn extra stars for their behavior amongst the others. Kiana loses a star and is put on notice.
2	"Teasing"	July 18, 2008
The girls were asked to point out the flaws of each of their competitors. Each girl was asked to use the comments against them to prepare a one-minute routine for a stand-up comedy challenge and tease themselves. Kiana was shown a taped message of her best friend explaining as to why she nominated Kiana for the show. In the second Progress Report, Shavon's overconfidence about gaining a star causes her to lose the star she earned.
3	"Judgment"	July 25, 2008
Each girl is asked to describe a housemate to a sketch artist in a closed session. Understanding that it is difficult to explain features without being judgmental, the girls are told they are to attend a "Dark Party" and meet eligible boys and select one based on personality alone. Gisbelle was shown a taped message of her long-time boyfriend who threatened their relationship if she did not change her ways. In the third Progress Report, Michelle was put on notice because she ignored the rules of the Dark Party.
4	"Power"	August 1, 2008
The girls were given different tasks and had the power to either do it themselves or pass it on to another girl. Later, the girls were forced to vote someone out of the house, the majority voting for Shavon. When Shavon returns during the Progress Report, it is revealed that her eviction was only an exercise for the girls. And it is clear when Shavon returns, she is not happy with the rest of the girls. Brittany was shown a taped message of a friend who explained as to why she was nominated Brittany for the show. At the fourth Progress Report, Brittany is put on notice for disregarding the message of her video.
5	"Self-Centeredness"	August 8, 2008
After Shavon's return to the house, the girls try to get along by playing a game. But nasty faces made by Shavon triggers the biggest altercation in the house yet. Stassi calls out Shavon on her rude behavior, and the two of them get into the biggest altercation in the house yet. The girls were each given a box of supplies to help them prepare for an upcoming talent show, with a grand prize total of $1,000. It was later revealed that they were to teach their talent to an elderly person who, in return, performs in the talent show. Michelle wins the talent show and the prize money. Later, Michelle was shown a taped message of her mother. At the fifth Progress Report, Dr. Michelle concludes that Brittany has given up on the process and eliminates her from the competition, sending Brittany home.
6	"Jealousy"	August 15, 2008
Camille was shown a taped message from her fiance. The girls participated in a competition to retrieve eggs with slips of paper inside indicating a number of seconds. Whoever had the most seconds would get that amount of time to talk on the phone with a family member, and have lunch at the beach. Afterward, Shavon is shown a taped message from her sister. Later, The girls have to create a billboard for the show. This later turns into a tough decision when only three girls get to appear on it. The three girls put on the billboard were Stassi, Michelle, and Shavon. After the sixth progress report, Kiana is again put on notice.
7	"Gossip"	August 22, 2008
Stassi is the last girl to see a taped message, which was from her mom. Shavon, Michelle, and Stassi were interviewed by gossip blogger, Perez Hilton. After their question and answer session, they face the consequences when the entire house gets to read his provocative article on the internet and America Online. It was later revealed by Yoanna that the article was not real, but to show how much gossiping can hurt others. Their next activity was to watch clips of what the girls said about the others. In the seventh progress report, Kiana made progress and was not sent home.
8	"Finale"	August 29, 2008
In the season finale episode, the girls meet the head of Para Los Niños, which is a charity foundation, and they must meet some of the teens there, and show them a good time. When they get back at the house, the girls get a call from Yoanna and to come to the common room. When they enter, they are reunited with the people who sent them to the house to change for the better. After they settle, they presented each of them separately with the chance to redeem themselves and show how much they've changed during the process. At the end, they find out who wins the competition and $25,000. Gisbelle became the Winner with 11 Stars, and she is asked by Yoanna what she wants to do with the money, and she decides she wants to donate it to Para Los Niños. After her decision, Yoanna tells Gisbelle that she will receive another 25,000 dollars for her generosity . At the end, she tells the girls to give a final goodbye to each other. Then, all the 6 girls are seen walking out the house together, ending the season finale.
