= Daniel Booko =

American actor and model

- Born: Daniel Paul Booko; October 17, 1983 (age 42)
- Occupation: Actor
- Years active: 2005–present
- Television: The Valley
- Height: 5’7”
- Spouse: Nia Sanchez (m. 2015)
- Children: 4

Daniel Paul Booko (born October 17, 1983) is an American actor and model. He is known as a main cast member on the Bravo reality television series The Valley.

== Career ==
He has had roles in The O.C, Hannah Montana, The Suite Life of Zack & Cody, and Desperate Housewives, and in the film Bratz: The Movie.

== Personal life ==
Booko married beauty pageant titleholder Nia Sanchez on October 17, 2015, in Temecula, California. Together, they have four children.

Both Booko and Sanchez are practicing Christians, they met at Mosaic Church in California. Booko is the son of Paul and Bonnie Booko, the founding pastors of Riverside Church in his hometown of Three Rivers, Michigan, a non-denominational church originally established by his grandfather in 1975.

== Filmography ==
Film
Year	Title	Role	Notes
2005	American Pie Presents: Band Camp	Senior Football Player	
2006	The Fast and the Furious: Tokyo Drift	Clay's Buddy #2	
2007	The Replacement Child	Burl Smith	Short
2007	Bratz: The Movie	Brad	
2008	MeterMan	Steve Slyker	Short
2008	Foreign Exchange	Gordan 'Shantz' Lally	
2008	Bleachers	Johnny	
2008	The Open Door	Spike	
2009	City of Shoulders and Noses	Officer Daniel Cursa	
2010	Crazy on the Outside	Cooper Luboja	
2011	A Warrior's Heart	Powell	
2011	Getting that Girl	Bill Beauchanon	
2012	Wyatt Earp's Revenge	Spike Kennedy	
2012	A Christmas Wedding Date	Bowman	
2012	Jersey Shore Shark Attack	Paulie Balzac	
2013	21 & Over	Julian	
2015	Superfast!	Curtis	
2016	Sniper: Special Ops	Rich	
2019	Secret Obsession	Russell Williams	

Television
Year	Title	Role	Notes
2005	The Suite Life of Zack & Cody	Kyle	Episode: "Maddie Checks In"
2005	Entourage	Frat Guy #1	Episode: "Aquamansion"
2006	Numb3rs	Jake Porter	Episode: "Dark Matter"
2006	The O.C.	Connor	Episode: "The Summer Bummer"
2007	Hannah Montana	Starvos	Episodes: "My Boyfriend's Jackson and There's Gonna Be Trouble"
2009	Desperate Housewives	Mahoney	Episode: "Don't Walk on the Grass"
2010	Medium	Crew Cut	Episode: "How to Beat a Bad Guy"
2011	iCarly	Cort	Episode: "iHire an Idiot"
2011	Romantically Challenged	Matthew Benjamin	Episode: "Hey-Now, Hey-Now, Perry's Girlfriend's Back"
2012	Kickin' It	Luke	Episode: "Skate Rat"
2016	The Goldbergs	Eddie/Jordy Wahlberg	Episode: "George! George Glass!"
2024–2026	The Valley	Self	Main Cast
