= Sex Tips for Straight Women from a Gay Man =

Sex Tips for Straight Women from a Gay Man is a comedy based on the book by Dan Anderson and Maggie Berman of the same name. Written and produced by Matt Murphy and directed by Tim Drucker it is an interactive off-Broadway show centered on three characters; Dan, the gay man, Robyn, the straight woman and Stefan, the seductive model.

In the play, Robyn is the moderator for this month's book forum at Rendezvous with Alternative Authors of the Modern Era (RAAME, pronounced "ram me"). This month RAAME is featuring Dan Anderson the author of Sex Tips for Straight Women from a Gay Man. Using the tips from his book Dan attempts to open Robyn up sexually and finally realize her feelings for her hunky stage assistant Stefan. Sex Tips opened in February 2014 at 777 Theatre. It starred Lindsay Nicole Chambers as Robyn and Jason Michael Snow as Dan and Andrew Brewer as Stefan. After a four-and-a-half year run, Murphy released a statement announcing the end of the show's New York City run, with the last performance on June 22 of 2018.

In 2017, the show secured a residency at the Anthony Cools Theatre inside Paris Las Vegas starring former television personality Kendra Wilkinson as Robyn. In 2018, Scheana Shay took on the role. In June 2019, MaKenzie Fly, a Vegas entertainer and yoga instructor, was cast as Robyn alongside husband Colin Cahill as Stefan and Mark Melton as Dan Anderson, who had been cast months prior. Shyllon Melatti took on the role of Stefan shortly after, and in September 2019, Louis D'Aprile was cast as the new Dan Anderson.

== Reception ==
Reviews have been generally positive with Kristin Morale from BroadwayWorld saying "…that one sentence makes up the command of "GO AND SEE IT FOR THE LIFE OF YOU," Pete Hampstead from TheatreMania said, "Even if you don't take any of its erogenous advice, Sex Tips is one of the best date-night shows you'll see this year." Anita Gates of The New York Times dissented, saying the production "feels like a blend of a bachelorette party at Chippendales and the embarrassing midnight act at a Pigalle tourist trap." Finally, The Knot listed it as one of their "6 Raunchy Comedy Shows Worthy Of A Bachelorette Party".
