= Vanderpump Rules: Jax & Brittany Take Kentucky =

American reality television series

- Genre: Reality
- Starring: Jax Taylor; Brittany Cartwright
- Country of origin: United States
- Original language: English
- No. of episodes: 6

Production
- Executive producers: Alex Baskin; Brittany Cartwright; Bill Langworthy; Douglas Ross; Greg Stewart; Jax Taylor; Ken Todd; Lisa Vanderpump
- Production location: Winchester, Kentucky
- Camera setup: Multi-camera
- Running time: 23–25 minutes
- Production company: Evolution Media

Original release
- Network: Bravo
- Release: August 23 – September 26, 2017

Related
- Vanderpump Rules; Vanderpump Rules After Show; Vanderpump Villa

Vanderpump Rules: Jax & Brittany Take Kentucky is an American reality television show that premiered on Bravo on August 23, 2017. Developed as the second spin-off of Vanderpump Rules.

The show focuses on Vanderpump Rules cast member Jax Taylor and his girlfriend Brittany Cartwright on vacation in her homestate, Kentucky, as Jax spends time and bonds with Brittany's family.

== Overview ==
The show was announced on April 10, 2017, by Bravo.

Vanderpump Rules cast member Jax Taylor and southern girlfriend Brittany Cartwright leave the comforts of Southern California to head out to her family's Kentucky farm. While that puts Brittany back in her element, city-guy Jax is a fish out of water when he exchanges his signature sweaters for overalls. He tries to embrace the region's lifestyle and leave a lasting impression on the locals. Jax faces new experiences that he doesn't come across in the city, including aggressive farm animals and coyote hunting, but the Kentucky visit also leads to challenges of a more personal nature, which include hearing endless marriage questions from Brittany's family and baby-sitting her nephew. As Brittany's friends and family question his commitment to her, Jax's patience and charm begin to wear thin. The ups and downs test the unlikely couple to see if their love can survive life on the farm.

== Episodes ==
No.	Title	Original release date
1	"Welcome to Kentucky"	August 23, 2017
2	"First Comes Love..."	August 30, 2017
3	"Let's Make a Baby"	September 6, 2017
4	"The Gospel According to Jax"	September 13, 2017
5	"About Last Night"	September 19, 2017
6	"Goodbye Kentucky"	September 26, 2017
