= The Valley: Persian Style =

- Genre: Reality
- Starring: Bamshad Akhbari; Sky Askari; Amir Boroumand; Adam Farahan; Reza Farahan; Tommy Feight; Golnesa Gharachedaghi; Greg Haroutunian; Reza Jackson; Mercedes Javid; Natasha Kashanian; Tanin Nikpey
- Country of origin: United States
- Original language: English
- No. of seasons: 1
- No. of episodes: 9

Production
- Executive producers: Alex Baskin; Jenn Levy; Brian McCarthy; Jeff Festa; Joe Kingsley; Ian Gelfand; Lauren Simms
- Camera setup: Multiple
- Running time: 41–43 minutes
- Production company: 32 Flavors

Original release
- Network: Bravo
- Release: January 8, 2026 – present

Related
- Shahs of Sunset; The Valley

The Valley: Persian Style is an American reality television series that premiered on January 8, 2026, on Bravo. Developed as a spin-off of both Shahs of Sunset and The Valley, the series follows a group of Persian friends who have opted for suburban life in the San Fernando Valley after living in Beverly Hills.

== Overview ==
Reza Farahan, Golnesa "GG" Gharachedaghi and Mercedes "MJ" Javid previously starred on Shahs of Sunset for nine seasons from 2012 to 2021. In April 2022, it was announced that Bravo had canceled the series after nine seasons. On May 7, 2025, it was announced that Farahan, Gharachedaghi and Javid would return to Bravo after over four years off the network on a show tentatively titled The Valley: Persian Style.

On November 14, 2025, it was announced that The Valley: Persian Style would premiere on January 8, 2026, with Farahan, Gharachedaghi and Javid as main cast members along with Farahan's husband, Adam Farahan, and Javid's husband, Tommy Feight who both previously appeared on Shahs of Sunset. Other main cast members joining the show include Sky Askari, Bamshad Akhbari, Greg Haroutunian, Tanin Nikpey, Amir Boroumand, Natasha Kashanian and Reza Jackson.

In May 2026, the series was renewed for a second season.

== Cast ==
=== Cast timeline ===
Cast member	Seasons
Cast member	1
Bamshad Akhbari	Main
Sky Askari	Main
Amir Boroumand	Main
Adam Farahan	Main
Reza Farahan	Main
Tommy Feight	Main
Golnesa "GG" Gharachedaghi	Main
Greg Haroutunian	Main
Reza Jackson	Main
Mercedes "MJ" Javid	Main
Natasha Kashanian	Main
Tanin Nikpey	Main

== Episodes ==
=== Series overview ===
Season	Episodes	Originally released		Average Viewers
Season	Episodes	First released	Last released	Average Viewers
1	9	January 8, 2026	February 26, 2026	0.33

No.	Title	Original release date	U.S. viewers (millions)
1	"Valley Days and Persian Nights"	January 8, 2026	0.29
2	"Darth Vida"	January 8, 2026	0.20
3	"Bartender Blues"	January 15, 2026	0.30
4	"Dennis the Menace"	January 22, 2026	0.30
5	"Sky's at the Limit"	January 29, 2026	0.36
6	"Desert Storm"	February 5, 2026	0.38
7	"Reza-loution?"	February 12, 2026	0.37
8	"Golnesa in the Sky with (Lab) Diamonds"	February 19, 2026	0.45
9	"Handle with (Skin) Care"	February 26, 2026	0.33
