= Vanderpump Rules season 12 =

Vanderpump Rules
- Season 12
- Promotional poster via Peacock
- Starring: Lisa Vanderpump; Venus Binkley; Jason Cohen; Shayne Davis; Chris Hahn; Angelica Jensen; Marcus Johnson; Audrey Lingle; Natalie Maguire; Demy Selem; Kim Suarez
- No. of episodes: 14

Release
- Original network: Bravo
- Original release: December 2, 2025 – March 10, 2026

Season chronology
- ← Previous; Season 11

The twelfth season of Vanderpump Rules, an American reality television series, is broadcast on Bravo. It premiered on December 2, 2025. The season was primarily filmed in West Hollywood, California.

The season focuses on the personal and professional lives of Venus Binkley, Jason Cohen, Shayne Davis, Chris Hahn, Angelica Jensen, Marcus Johnson, Audrey Lingle, Natalie Maguire, Demy Selem and Kim Suarez, along with Lisa Vanderpump.

This season, the series was rebooted and features an entirely new cast with all of the cast members from the eleventh season (besides Vanderpump) being replaced.

== Cast ==
On November 26, 2024, the series was renewed for a twelfth season and would be rebooted, replacing the entire cast from the eleventh season.

On November 3, 2025, it was announced the twelfth season of the series would premiere on December 2, 2025, with Lisa Vanderpump returning to the series along with Venus Binkley, Jason Cohen, Shayne Davis, Chris Hahn, Angelica Jensen, Marcus Johnson, Audrey Lingle, Natalie Maguire, Demy Selem and Kim Suarez joining the series. Selem, Binkley, Maguire, and Johnson have all made guest appearances in previous seasons.

== Episodes ==
No. overall	No. in season	Title	Original release date	US viewers (millions)
—	—	"Vanderpump Rules: Raise Your Glass to 11 Seasons"	November 25, 2025	N/A
225	1	"Sur-ving Drama"	December 2, 2025	0.30
226	2	"Manifest and Chill"	December 9, 2025	0.24
227	3	"Crash Out Queens"	December 16, 2025	0.20
228	4	"Pour Decisions"	December 30, 2025	0.17
229	5	"Seeing Red (Flags)"	January 6, 2026	0.19
230	6	"Pump Fiction"	January 13, 2026	0.20
231	7	"Paso Aggressive"	January 20, 2026	0.22
232	8	"Speakerphone Suckerpunch"	January 27, 2026	0.25
233	9	"Rosé All Day"	February 3, 2026	0.24
234	10	"Threesome's a Crowd"	February 10, 2026	0.23
235	11	"Back Alley Betrayals"	February 17, 2026	0.23
236	12	"Pride and Joy"	February 24, 2026	0.21
237	13	"Reunion Part 1"	March 3, 2026	0.27
238	14	"Reunion Part 2"	March 10, 2026	0.23
