= Vanderpump Rules season 10 =

2023 reality television season

Vanderpump Rules
- Season 10
- Promotional poster via Peacock
- Starring: Lisa Vanderpump; Katie Maloney; Tom Sandoval; Scheana Shay; Ariana Madix; Tom Schwartz; James Kennedy; Lala Kent; Raquel Leviss
- No. of episodes: 19

Release
- Original network: Bravo
- Original release: February 8 – June 14, 2023

Additional information
- Filming dates: July 13 – September 17, 2022

Season chronology
- Next → Season 11

The tenth season of Vanderpump Rules, an American reality television series, is broadcast on Bravo. It aired from February 8, 2023, until June 14, 2023. The season was primarily filmed in West Hollywood, California from July to September 2022. Additional footage was shot in Las Vegas, Lake Havasu City, Cancún, and Cuyama, California. The season's executive producers are Douglas Ross, Alex Baskin, Bill Langworthy, Lisa Vanderpump, Ken Todd, Tina Gazzerro, Jeremiah Smith, Jen McClure-Metz, Joe Kingsley and Natalie Neurauter.

The season focuses on the personal and professional lives of Katie Maloney, Tom Sandoval, Scheana Shay, Ariana Madix, Tom Schwartz, James Kennedy, Lala Kent and Raquel Leviss, along with Lisa Vanderpump.

== Cast and synopsis ==
On December 4, 2022, Randall Emmett revealed that he would not return for the tenth season and claimed he "never wanted to be on" the show in the first place.

On December 29, 2022, Brock Davies announced that he would feature in a reduced role during the tenth season.

The official cast for the tenth season was revealed on January 9, 2023. The full cast returned aside from Burnett who was demoted to a recurring capacity and the previously announced Davies who would make guest appearances throughout the season. Former cast member Kristina Kelly returned in a supporting role and was joined by Ally Lewber, girlfriend of James Kennedy. Doute, Madrigal and Todd made guest appearances.

== Episodes ==
No. overall	No. in season	Title	Original release date	US viewers (millions)
—	—	"How They Got Here 2023"	February 1, 2023	0.22
187	1	"Breaking Bubbas"	February 8, 2023	0.84
188	2	"Was It Worth It?"	February 15, 2023	0.73
189	3	"Troll Mates"	February 22, 2023	0.66
190	4	"No Home Left to Wreck"	March 1, 2023	0.64
191	5	"Lovestruck at the Discopussy"	March 8, 2023	0.87
192	6	"Divorce Party Crashers"	March 15, 2023	1.07
193	7	"Galaxy Gaslighting"	March 22, 2023	1.05
194	8	"By Invitation Only"	March 29, 2023	1.17
195	9	"Forbidden Fruit"	April 5, 2023	1.14
196	10	"It's All Happening ... Again"	April 12, 2023	1.12
197	11	"Mistress in Distress"	April 19, 2023	1.17
198	12	"Beach, Don't Kill My Vibe"	April 26, 2023	1.16
199	13	"Lady and the Glamp"	May 3, 2023	1.41
200	14	"There's Something About Her"	May 10, 2023	1.44
201	15	"#Scandoval"	May 17, 2023	1.89
202	16	"Reunion Part 1"	May 24, 2023	2.04
203	17	"Reunion Part 2"	May 31, 2023	1.87
204	18	"Reunion Part 3"	June 7, 2023	2.00
205	19	"Secrets Revealed"	June 14, 2023	1.13
