= Scheana Shay =

American television personality (born 1985)

Scheana Davies
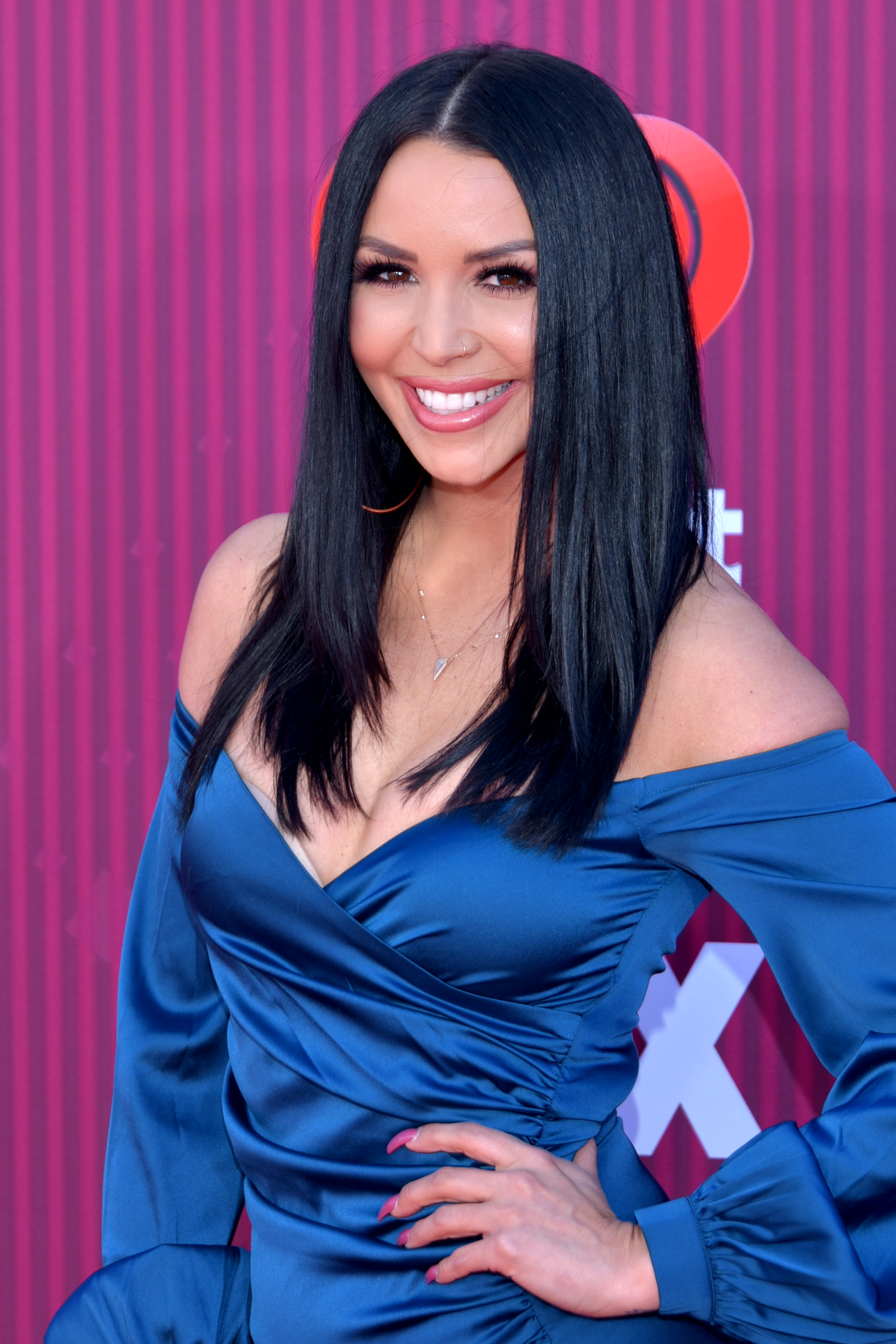
- Davies at the iHeartRadio Music Awards in March 2019
- Born: Scheana Marie Jancan; May 7, 1985 (age 41); West Covina, California, U.S.
- Other name: Scheana Davies
- Occupations: Television personality, actress, singer
- Years active: 2006–present
- Television: Vanderpump Rules
- Spouses: Michael Shay (m. 2014; div. 2017) Brock Davies (m. 2021)
- Children: 1

Scheana Marie Davies (previously Shay, née Jancan; born May 7, 1985) is an American television personality, singer, podcast host, and actress. She was an original cast member on the Bravo reality television series Vanderpump Rules for eleven seasons. Shay made guest appearances on the spin-off, The Valley, in the second season.

== Early life and education ==
Scheana Marie Jancan was born on May 7, 1985. She has Mexican heritage. She graduated in 2002 from Bishop Amat Memorial High School in La Puente, California. In 2006, she graduated with a bachelor's degree in broadcast journalism from Azusa Pacific University.

== Career ==
She began her acting career with guest appearances on television shows Greek, Jonas, Victorious and 90210. In 2009, she appeared as the female lead in Jonas Brothers' music video for the song "Pizza Girl". In 2012, she portrayed Angel Tomlin in three episodes of the anthology television series Femme Fatales.

In 2013, she became a regular cast member on Bravo's reality television series Vanderpump Rules. The series follows the lives of SUR and PUMP servers in West Hollywood, California. During her time on Vanderpump Rules, Shay released several dance-pop singles, most notably "Good as Gold." For her role on Vanderpump Rules, Shay and her co-stars Ariana Madix, Katie Maloney and Lala Kent won the "Best Reality On-Screen Team" award at the 2023 MTV Movie & TV Awards. She starred on Vanderpump Rules for 11 seasons, until the show was recast.

In 2018, Davies relocated to Las Vegas for several months to star in a stage show called Sex Tips for Straight Women from a Gay Man at Anthony Cools Theater at Paris Las Vegas. She replaced Kendra Wilkinson in the role of Robyn. Since 2018, she has hosted a weekly podcast titled Scheananigans with Scheana Shay.

On August 18, 2023, she released a song, "Apples" with Los Angeles–based group the 27s. Rolling Stone magazine wrote of the song: "Not only does it sound like a bop, but it also seems like she’s drawing inspiration from her recent experiences dealing with friendship breakups in light of Scandoval." Entertainment Weekly called the song "kind of a banger" and predicted "it might just be the song of the summer." In a February 2024 interview with the Rolling Stone, Scheana and The 27s announced that they were working on an EP together. On March 1, 2024, she released a third song with the group the 27s called "Sweet & Sour". Also in 2024, Scheana and The 27s re-recorded an emo screamo version of her song "Good As Gold", originally released in 2013.

On March 12, 2024, Variety announced that Davies and her husband Brock would guest star on the second season of NBC's sitcom Lopez vs Lopez. They played a couple named Erica and Justin, rival parents at Mayan's, played by Mayan Lopez, daughter's school. On August 4, 2024, she served as a judge at the 73rd annual Miss USA pageant. In 2025, Shay competed on season thirteen of The Masked Singer as "Bat". She was the first of Group B to be eliminated in the "Group B Premiere: Voices of Mount Olympus."

Her book, My Good Side: A Memoir, was published by Grand Central Publishing on July 22, 2025. The book debuted at number four on The New York Times Best Seller list in the nonfiction category. Kirkus Reviews wrote in a favorable book review: "Effervescent throughout, Davies doesn’t skimp on the insider details and is a naturally engaging storyteller, sharing the mostly amusing anecdotes of her on- and off-camera life with candor, youthful charm, wit, and gratitude for her fame and the many joys (and pains) it’s brought to her life thus far."

=== Business ventures ===
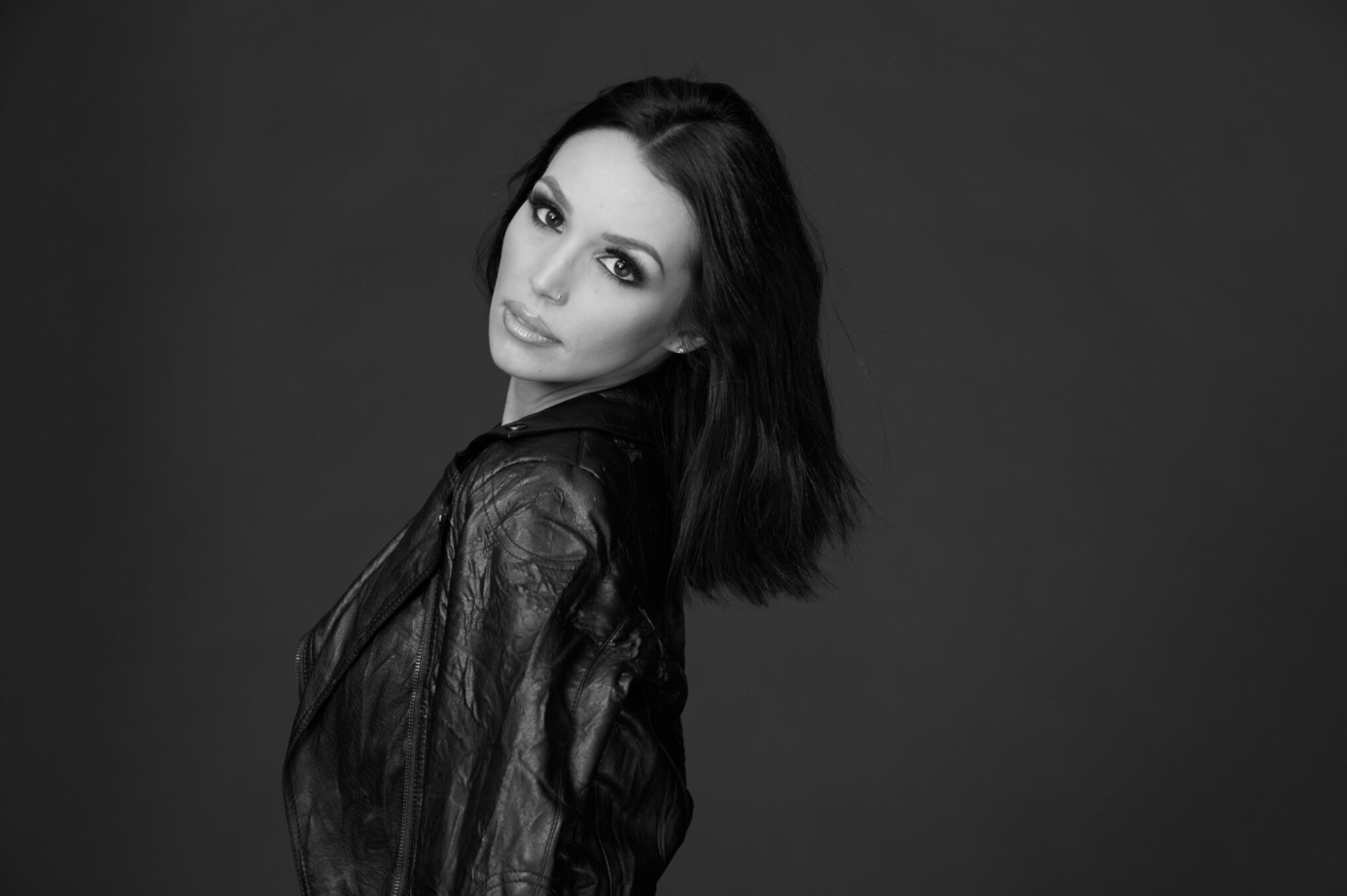
Davies in 2017

In July 2022, she launched her own eyelashes line, Viva Verano Lashes, consisting of three styles: "Summer", "Moon", and "Honey". Davies’s daughter inspired the line, with each lash named after her.

She has a large social media following and endorses products such as beauty and wellness products on Instagram. She has done numerous brand collaborations, including Steve Madden, Smirnoff, Paramount Pictures, Elf Cosmetics, Dove, and Shark Beauty.

== Personal life ==
Davies was part of a lawsuit against Hooters alleging a manager secretly filmed her while she undressed in 2004.

Davies dated actor Eddie Cibrian while he was married to Brandi Glanville. She denies knowing that Cibrian was married at the time; she believed that he was separated from Glanville and that their divorce was being finalized. In a 2013 interview with Us Weekly, Davies recalled, "Seven years ago I met Eddie, and six or eight months go by and I find out that he’s married and I call him out. He lied at first about it and then he admitted it. So I stopped talking to him for a long time." Scheana did not know that Cibrian was also dating singer LeAnn Rimes.

=== Marriage to Michael Shay ===
Davies married Michael Shay on July 27, 2014, at Hummingbird Nest Ranch in Santa Susana, California after knowing each other for over a decade. The couple announced their separation in November 2016 and finalized their divorce in April 2017.

After her divorce, Davies decided to freeze her eggs. For the six weeks before the egg retrieval, Davies said she stopped drinking, smoking marijuana, and having sex. She successfully harvested 12 eggs. In 2019, Davies froze her eggs again, less than a year after undergoing the procedure for the first time.

=== Marriage to Brock Davies and family ===
She began dating Brock Davies in 2019. After suffering a miscarriage with Davies, Scheana announced on October 28, 2020, that she was expecting her first child in April 2021. After the birth of her daughter, Scheana was diagnosed with postpartum OCD and sought treatment for the disorder. Scheana legally married Brock Davies in August 2021; they held a wedding celebration on August 23, 2022, at Dreams Natura Resort & Spa in Cancún, Mexico.

=== Tattoos ===
She has several tattoos, including an apple, a treble clef, a flower, a star, and the word "Summer,” a tribute to her daughter. She has a matching tattoo with her mother of a hummingbird behind her ear, in honor of her late grandmother. She has "Good As Gold,” after her single, and "It's All Happening" on her arm, a quote from her favorite film, Almost Famous.

== Advocacy ==
In July 2024, she received the Illumination Award from International OCD Foundation for her advocacy in raising awareness about postpartum obsessive–compulsive disorder.

== Discography ==
List of songs by Scheana Marie
Year	Title	Album	Credited as
2012	"What I Like"	Non-album single	Scheana Marie
2013	"Good As Gold"	Non-album single	Scheana Marie
2014	"Shake That"	Non-album single	Scheana Marie
2019	"Better Without You"	Non-album single	Scheana Shay
2020	"One More Time"	Non-album single	Scheana Shay
2023	"Apples"	Non-album single	Scheana Marie & the 27s
2024	"Boy Crazy"	Non-album single	Scheana Marie & the 27s
2024	"Sweet & Sour"	Non-album single	Scheana Marie & the 27s
2024	"Good As Gold (Screamo Version)"	Non-album single	Scheana Marie & the 27s

As a featured artist
Year	Title	Artist(s)
2024	"Get Back Up"	Station Little feat. Jordan Omley, Scheana Marie, The 27's

== Filmography ==
=== Television ===
Year	Title	Role	Notes
2007	Greek	Jenny	Uncredited; Episode: "Friday Night Frights"
2009	Jonas	Maria	Episode: "Pizza Girl"
2009	The Hills	Herself	Uncredited; 3 episodes
2010	90210	Cassandra	Episode: "2021 Vision"
2011	Victorious	Patrice	Episode: "Beck Falls for Tori"
2011–2025	The Real Housewives of Beverly Hills	Herself	9 episodes
2012	Femme Fatales	Angel Tomlin	3 episodes
2013–2024	Vanderpump Rules	Herself	Series regular (Seasons 1–11); 224 episodes
2015	TMI Hollywood	Various	Host; 2 episodes
2015	Reality Television Awards	Herself	Presenter; Television special
2015–2016	Steve Harvey	Herself	Panelist; 2 episodes
2017	Summer House	Herself	Episode: "Summer House"
2019	Hollywood Medium	Herself	Episode: "Scheana Shay, Brad Goreski, Karamo Brown"
2024	75th Primetime Creative Arts Emmy Awards	Herself	Presenter; Television special
2024	Lopez vs Lopez	Erica	Episode: "Lopez vs. Dreams"
2024	Miss USA 2024	Herself	Judge; Television special
2024–2025	The Valley	Herself	11 episodes
2025	The Masked Singer	Bat	Contestant on season 13; Episode: "Group B Premiere: Voices of Olympus"

=== Web series ===
Year	Title	Role	Notes
2023	E.l.f. Cosmetics	Herself	Episode: "Episode 2 | Katie Maloney & Scheana Marie"

=== Film ===
Year	Title	Role	Notes
2006	Jaded	Amanda	Short film
2012	Wedding Day	N/A	Uncredited
2015	Mouthpiece	Maria	

=== Theatre ===
Year	Production	Role	Venue
2018	Sex Tips for Straight Women from a Gay Man	Robyn	Anthony Cools Theater at Paris Las Vegas

=== Music videos ===
Year	Title	Artist	Role
2009	"Pizza Girl"	Jonas Brothers	Pizza Girl
2023	"Margot Robbie"	Bryce Vine	Margot Robbie

=== Podcasts ===
Year	Title	Role	Platform
2018–present	Scheananigans with Scheana Shay	Host	Dear Media

== Bibliography ==
- Shay, Scheana. My Good Side: A Memoir (2025)

== Awards and nominations ==
List of awards and nominations
Year	Ceremony	Award	Work	Result
2023	MTV Movie & TV Awards	Best Reality On-Screen Team (shared with Ariana Madix, Katie Maloney and Lala Kent)	Vanderpump Rules	Won
2024	International OCD Foundation	Illumination Award		Won
