= Vanderpump Rules =

American reality television series

- Genre: Reality
- Starring: Vanderpump Rules cast
- Theme music composer: Dena Deadly
- Opening theme: Raise Your Glass
- Country of origin: United States
- Original language: English
- No. of seasons: 12
- No. of episodes: 238 (list of episodes)

Production
- Executive producers: Alex Baskin; Bill Langworthy; Jeremiah Smith; Jen McClure-Metz; Natalie Neurauter; Douglas Ross; Greg Stewart; Ken Todd; Lisa Vanderpump
- Camera setup: Multiple
- Running time: 43 minutes
- Production companies: Evolution Media; 32 Flavors

Original release
- Network: Bravo
- Release: January 7, 2013 – present

Related
- Vanderpump Rules After Show; Vanderpump Rules: Jax & Brittany Take Kentucky; The Real Housewives of Beverly Hills; Vanderpump Dogs; The Valley; Vanderpump Villa; House of Stassi

Vanderpump Rules is an American reality television series that has been broadcast on Bravo since January 7, 2013. Developed as the first spin-off from The Real Housewives of Beverly Hills, it has aired 12 seasons and focuses on Lisa Vanderpump and the staff at her restaurants and bars: SUR Restaurant & Lounge, Pump Restaurant, and Tom Tom, in West Hollywood, California.

The success of the show has resulted in four spin-offs: Vanderpump Rules After Show, Vanderpump Rules: Jax & Brittany Take Kentucky, The Valley, and Vanderpump Rules: Lisa Las Vegas.

== Overview ==
Vanderpump Rules follows Lisa Vanderpump and the staff at SUR Restaurant & Lounge in West Hollywood, California, as they work on building their futures in show business and become entangled in interpersonal drama. The show initially centered on new server Scheana and her relationships with established employees Kristen Doute, Katie Maloney, Tom Sandoval, Stassi Schroeder, and Jax Taylor.

=== Season 1 ===
The first season aired from January 7 to March 11, 2013. The original cast consisted of Kristen Doute, Katie Maloney, Tom Sandoval, Stassi Schroeder, Scheana, Jax Taylor, and Lisa Vanderpump as series regulars, with Peter Madrigal, Tom Schwartz, Mike Shay, Laura-Leigh, and Frank Herlihy as recurring cast members. Ariana Madix made guest appearances in the first season.

On February 4, 2013, on an episode of Watch What Happens Live!, Andy Cohen announced that a reunion would be held, to be filmed on February 9, 2013. In April 2013, the show was announced to be renewed for a second season.

=== Season 2 ===
The second season aired from November 4, 2013, to February 25, 2014. Kristina Kelly and Ariana Madix were introduced as recurring cast members, and James Kennedy made guest appearances. The season premiere was a two-hour crossover episode with the fourth-season premiere of The Real Housewives of Beverly Hills. The reunion was taped on January 10, 2014. In April 2014, the show was announced to be renewed for a third season.

=== Season 3 ===
The third season aired from November 3, 2014, to March 25, 2015. Ariana Madix and Tom Schwartz were promoted from recurring cast members to series regulars, and James Kennedy and Vail Bloom were introduced as recurring cast members. The reunion was recorded on February 6, 2015. In July 2015, the show was announced to be renewed for a fourth season.

=== Season 4 ===
The fourth season aired from November 2, 2015, to April 11, 2016. James Kennedy was promoted from a recurring cast member to a series regular, and Faith Stowers and Lala Kent were introduced as recurring cast members. Stassi Schroeder (who had departed the show at the end of season three) and Brittany Cartwright made guest appearances. Isaac Kappy and Tom Sandoval guest-starred this season with their band Charles McMansion, performing the song "T.I.P." The reunion was filmed on February 19, 2016. In April 2016, the show was announced to be renewed for a fifth season.

=== Season 5 ===
The fifth season aired from November 7, 2016, to April 17, 2017. Stassi Schroeder returned as a series regular, and Brittany Cartwright was introduced as a recurring cast member. Kristina Kelly and Raquel Leviss made guest appearances in the season. On January 9, 2017, the 10th episode, "Summer House Rules" served as a crossover preview to Summer House. The reunion was filmed on February 24, 2017. In April 2017, the show was announced to be renewed for a sixth season.

=== Season 6 ===
The sixth season aired from December 4, 2017, to May 28, 2018. Brittany Cartwright shifted from guest-appearance status to become a series regular, and Lala Kent was promoted from recurring cast to become a series regular. Billie Lee and Raquel Leviss were introduced as recurring cast members. Mike Shay, Kristina Kelly, and Faith Stowers made guest appearances in the season. From the sixth season, many of the cast began volunteering at The Vanderpump Dog Foundation. In April 2018, the show was announced to be renewed for a seventh season. The reunion was taped on March 18, 2018.

=== Season 7 ===
The seventh season aired from December 3, 2018, to May 20, 2019. Beau Clark was introduced as a recurring cast member, and Kristina Kelly, Max Boyens, and Dayna Kathan made guest appearances. During the season, Lisa Vanderpump and Ken Todd partnered with cast members Tom Sandoval and Tom Schwartz to open Tom Tom Restaurant and Bar in West Hollywood, California. The reunion was taped on March 29, 2019.

=== Season 8 ===
The eighth season aired from January 7 to June 16, 2020. Beau Clark was promoted from recurring cast member to series regular; Max Boyens, Brett Caprioni, and Dayna Kathan were introduced as series regulars, and Charli Burnett, Danica Dow, and Brett Willis were introduced as recurring cast members. Randall Emmett made guest appearances in the season. Due to the COVID-19 pandemic, the reunion was recorded virtually via Zoom on April 30, 2020.

On June 9, 2020, original cast members Kristen Doute and Stassi Schroeder were announced to have been fired following accusations by former co-star Faith Stowers. Stowers said Doute and Schroeder had filed a false police report against her for a crime she did not commit. Additionally, Max Boyens and Brett Caprioni were not to return for the ninth season in light of the resurfacing of past Twitter posts that included racist commentary. On December 4, 2020, Jax Taylor and Brittany Cartwright were also fired from the show.

=== Season 9 ===
In December 2020, following the departures of several cast members, and due to challenges associated with the COVID-19 pandemic mitigation efforts, production on season nine was put on hold "indefinitely." On April 27, 2021, the network confirmed that the show would return for a ninth season and that Lisa Vanderpump, Maloney, Sandoval, Scheana, Madix, Schwartz, Kennedy, Kent, and Leviss would be returning to the show as cast members. In April 2021, Dayna Kathan confirmed that she would not be returning for the ninth season and suggested that production on the show was to resume in the near future.

Production for the ninth season started in early May 2021 and ended on July 17, 2021. Kennedy and Leviss' engagement party served as the finale.

The ninth season aired from September 28, 2021, to January 26, 2022. Charli Burnett and Raquel Leviss were promoted to series regulars; Brock Davies was introduced and added as a series regular; and Richardson Chery, Randall Emmett, Corey Loftus, and Max Todd were introduced as recurring cast members. The reunion was taped on December 3, 2021. James Kennedy and Raquel Leviss called off their engagement during the taping, effectively ending their relationship. In May 2022, the show was announced to be renewed for a 10th season.

=== Season 10 ===
Filming for the 10th season started on July 13, 2022, and ended on September 17, 2022. On December 4, 2022, Randall Emmett revealed that he would not return for the 10th season and said he "never wanted to be on" the show in the first place. On December 29, 2022, Brock Davies announced that he would appear on the show in a reduced role during the 10th season. The official cast for the 10th season was revealed on January 9, 2023. Aside from Burnett, who shifted from regular cast member to recurring cast member, and Davies's shift from regular cast member to guest appearances, the full cast returned. Former cast member Kristina Kelly returned in a supporting role, joined by Ally Lewber, the girlfriend of James Kennedy. Doute, Madrigal, and Todd made guest appearances.

On March 3, 2023, a source close to production revealed that Tom Sandoval and Ariana Madix had split after Madix found out Sandoval had been having an affair with Raquel Leviss. In light of the news, cameras went back up to capture the immediate fall-out. On March 7, Leviss filed a temporary restraining order (TRO) against Scheana Shay, alleging Shay had punched her after learning of the affair.

The reunion was recorded on March 23, 2023. The TRO prohibited Shay and Leviss from being within 100 yards of one another, so they filmed at separate times. Leviss filed to drop the TRO on March 24, but the March 29 court date remained on the docket. The TRO was dismissed on March 29 after Leviss failed to appear in court. In May 2023, the show was announced to be renewed for an 11th season.

=== Season 11 ===
Filming for the 11th season started on June 28 and ended on September 1, 2023. On August 17, 2023, Raquel Leviss was confirmed as not returning for that season following "Scandoval."

On December 11, 2023, the 11th season was announced to premiere on January 30, 2024, with Lisa Vanderpump, Tom Schwartz, Tom Sandoval, Ariana Madix, Katie Maloney, Scheana Shay, Lala Kent, James Kennedy, and Ally Lewber all returning alongside Brock Davies in a recurring capacity. Former cast members Jax Taylor, Billie Lee, Brittany Cartwright, Dayna Kathan, Kristina Kelly, and Max Todd made guest appearances. The reunion was recorded on March 16, 2024.

In April 2024, it was announced that the series would not film during the summer of 2024. Bravo wanted to give the cast a break following "Scandoval" and its aftermath. Ariana Madix's commitment to hosting season six of Love Island was rumored to have contributed to the hiatus. A filming start date was not announced at the time.

In November 2024, the series was renewed for a 12th season, with the show now being completely rebooted for the first time in the show's history, along with an entirely new cast now replacing the previous cast members. The new cast was to be composed of current SUR Restaurant employees. The new season would start filming in 2025. The cast list and premiere date were not available at the time of announcement. A retrospective special commemorating the first 11 seasons aired prior to the 12th season.

In December 2024, James Kennedy was arrested on a misdemeanor domestic violence charge. A Burbank police log of the incident says he was arrested at 11:50 pm and that a "female stated her boyfriend lifted her up and threw her to the ground."

=== Season 12 ===
On November 3, 2025, Bravo released the trailer alongside the cast list for the twelfth season. The premiere date was announced as December 2, 2025. Lisa Vanderpump is the only returning cast member. New additions to the series included current SUR Restaurant employees Venus Binkley, Jason Cohen, Chris Hahn, Angelica Jensen, Marcus Johnson, Audrey Lingle, Natalie Maguire, Demy Selem, and Kim Suarez. Shayne Davis, who is not a SUR employee, also joined the cast. A retrospective special titled "Raise Your Glass to 11 Seasons" aired on November 25, 2025. The special showcased memorable moments from the previous eleven seasons, unaired footage, and footage from the season 12 premiere.

In February 2026, TMZ reported that the series had received an early renewal for a thirteenth season. A month later, executive producer Alex Baskin told The Hollywood Reporter: "That's a little premature. We are hopeful, but that is not official news." As of July 2026, the series has not been officially renewed.

In May 2026, a spin-off titled "Vanderpump Rules: Lisa Las Vegas" was announced. The limited series is set to follow the creation and opening of The Vanderpump Hotel.

== Scandoval controversy, timeline, and cultural impact ==
On March 3, 2023, while the 10th season was airing, a widely publicized personal controversy involving cast members Tom Sandoval, Ariana Madix, and Raquel Leviss, came to light. The controversy, informally referred to as "Scandoval" by media outlets and fans, centered on Sandoval's affair with Leviss while in a long-term relationship with Madix. Sandoval had been in a relationship with Madix since February 2014. The affair, which reportedly began in August 2022, continued for approximately seven months before Madix discovered it in March 2023.

Leviss was also a cast member and had been portrayed as a close friend of Madix on the series, despite Leviss stating in interviews that they weren't that close. Before her relationship with Sandoval became public, Leviss had been in a relationship with fellow cast member James Kennedy. Leviss made her first appearance on the show as James Kennedy's girlfriend before joining the seventh season as a recurring cast member. Kennedy and Leviss were engaged in October 2021 and ended their relationship in November 2021.

Before Leviss, Sandoval admitted to cheating on Madix with a random woman named Annemarie Kunkel from Miami, Florida to Scheana Shay after Scandoval came out. Kristen Doute on Season 3, Episode 13 brought the Miami Girl to California to confront Sandoval, in which he denies the affair with her and Ariana defends him.

Sandoval was originally dating Kristen Doute on Seasons 1 and 2 when she accused of Tom of cheating on her with Ariana. Both denied anything happened during Sandoval and Doute's relationship, but Sandoval admitted that they did make out in Las Vegas 3 years before Season 2 was filmed at the Golden Nugget Casino. After Scandoval, Doute and Madix became friends and are still friends as of April 2026. Doute claimed that Sandoval lied to Ariana about him and Doute not dating.

It also came out on Season 2 that Kristen was cheating on Sandoval with Jax Taylor when she was accusing him of cheating on her, resulting in Sandoval punching Taylor in the face on Episode 14 and Stassi Schroeder slapping Kristen the episode before, as Stassi was dating Jax at the time.

Before any of the women learned about the affair, they were wary of Leviss. Katie Maloney and Lala Kent on a July 2022 girls trip to Las Vegas, Nevada brought this concern to Leviss about her going after taken men, which included Schwartz. On the trip, Leviss made out with Oliver Saunders, a New York City native who is the son of Garcelle Beauvais from The Real Housewives of Beverly Hills. He worked at Vanderpump's Las Vegas restaurant, Vanderpump à Paris. Kent was flirting with him first (both women didn't know he was with a partner during this), but Leviss asked if she can shoot her shot with Saunders, which Kent allowed. Madix was also on the trip, but left early due to her dog dying.

According to Oliver's ex-wife, Samantha, the two were still together when the kiss happened.

The affair started in August 2022 at a boys' night trip that Leviss surprise visited. On the show, cast members like Maloney and Kent suspected that Raquel was seeing a man in the friend group, thinking originally that it was Tom Schwartz.

Schwartz and Leviss made out with each other the same time Sandoval and Leviss started their affair (August 2022) at Scheana Shay's wedding in Cancun, Mexico on August 23. Leviss was sharing a room with a friend named Jenny Ting, and kicked Ting out of their room to sleep with Sandoval. During the trip, fans noted that in a scene, Sandoval looked like he was touching Leviss's butt right behind Madix. Kent agreed with fans that Sandoval did that.

Schwartz and his ex-wife Katie Maloney agreed not to see anybody while they were finalizing their divorce at the time, which he did with Leviss on the wedding trip. Madix found out about the kiss and said that for the first time, she was angry at Raquel for ignoring Katie's boundaries and going after her ex-husband. Schwartz himself knew about the affair since August 2022, but protected Sandoval and Leviss. He also made a joke about Raquel after learning about the affair, saying "I don't want to kill the vibe but Raquel has a type. Brock and Tom, be careful tonight. She likes men that are taken."

Later on, castmates noticed Sandoval and Leviss being close and Sandoval purposefully ignoring Madix, including partying with Leviss during the affair when Madix's grandma in Melbourne, Florida passed away and she was grieving (and later going to Florida for her grandmother's funeral) in September 2022 and after her dog named Charlotte York died in August of that year. Sandoval and Leviss were making out in his car during Madix grieving over Charlotte. At the September party, Kent said that her and other people, including Sandoval's friend Jason tried giving him rides to be there for Madix while she grieved, which Sandoval refused. Madix stayed in Florida due to Hurricane Nicole, while Sandoval, Leviss, and Schwartz hang out at her place in a hot tub. Leviss admitted that she and Sandoval made out when Madix was in Florida for the funeral.

Madix claimed that Sandoval almost killed their dog, Mya Moon, due to 'reckless behavior'. Sandoval also gave Madix a hard time when she asked to him help Charlotte with her anti-seizure medication shortly before her death.

On October at Bravocon, Maloney made comments about Leviss to Schwartz about how weird she viewed Leviss following him around and called Leviss a fangirl, to which Schwartz replied "She’s not there for me. Trust me.". At Bravocon, Leviss wore a TomTom hoodie, which weirded out Maloney.

On Halloween, Sandoval dressed up as Bravocon Raquel. Leviss and Madix dressed up with a friend Brad as Sailor Moon characters.

Before Scandoval came out, Leviss talked to Madix about her and Sandoval's sex life, and gave Madix advice to improve her relationship with Sandoval.

On Valentine's Day, according to Sandoval, he broke up with Madix and she was in denial. Leviss was at this dinner when the alleged breakup happened, but neither Madix or Leviss confirmed this claim. On Valentine's Day 2020, Ariana while doing an interview with The Daily Dish, said that Sandoval fell for her first.

Madix found out about the affair accidentally in early March while Sandoval was performing with his band at Tom Tom. While performing, Tom's phone fell out of his pocket, and a friend gave it to Ariana. She had a "women's intuition" to check his phone, where she saw a graphic facetime of Tom and Raquel doing sexual stuff that Sandoval saved. She saved the video and sent it to Leviss, saying "You are dead to me." and called Leviss a "fucking rat."

That same day, Sandoval claimed that Madix asked him about the idea of having kids together before she found out about the affair.

Immediately, this scandal received extensive coverage in entertainment media and prompted significant discussion around personal conduct and reality television ethics. Many news outlets like People Magazine and E News covered the story and described it as a turning point for the series in both its impact on on-screen dynamics and off-screen relationships.

In aftermath of this scandal, Sandoval and Madix ended their nearly ten year long relationship. In addition, both Leviss and Sandoval faced intense backlash from fans and commentators, even from Lisa Vanderpump. One example is Tom Sandoval comparing the situation to the O.J Simpson trial and the murder of George Floyd. Another example is when castmate Scheana Shay found out about the affair after filming Watch What Happens Live! on March 1, she shoved Leviss and threw Leviss's phone, resulting in Leviss having a scratch on her nose. Leviss claimed Shay punched her, which Shay denied. Leviss filed a restraining order on Shay that she dropped later on.

That same day on March 1, an episode came out where Leviss admitted to trying to get Schwartz to make out with her, which he declined.

At the season 10 reunion, which was filmed on March 23, nobody but Tom Schwartz had Sandoval and Leviss's backs. While Madix was explaining that Sandoval and her were having sex during his affair, he said "Yeah, she had a T-Shirt on. It was really hot." which resulted in Vanderpump calling the comment a low blow, Kent calling him a "fucking dick" and many people calling him disgusting.

On an April 12 episode, Sandoval chanted Leviss's name, to which Madix found weird. He explained that he did that to support Leviss and Schwartz making out, to which Madix called him "the worst".

Commentators noted how this shaped the public's narrative of the show's later seasons. Further, this scandal affected production plans for the series. Bravo decided to delay and pause filming for the twelfth season to allow all cast members the time to process the fallout and to adjust the new logistics of filming. Reports shared that the decision to avoid filming in their typical summer production was due to the sensitive nature of the scandal and the way it affected the cast dynamics. This was a big deviation for the show's established pattern.

In April, Leviss went to a mental health facility in Wickenburg, Arizona. On May 17, Leviss and Sandoval announced that they broke up. Sandoval said that he stopped drinking and smoking cigarettes as Leviss went to a facility for her and that he was 'fully in love with her'.

After this break, Bravo decided to have an entire new cast for the season 12 reboot after eleven seasons centered around the original cast. This rebooted season premiered in December 2025 with a notable shift in the franchise's direction and has been talked about in entertainment coverage.

The scandal's culture resonance went far beyond the series itself. It showed how the public and fan communities engaged with the scandal in real time with media commentary. This showed a trend in reality television viewership and personal drama narratives as Vanderpump Rules spiked in popularity after Scandoval. Critics looked at how personal relationships and ethical considerations can intersect with entertainment value in shows that are unscripted. For example, this scandal consumed fan attention and changed the series reputation in the reality TV landscape. Fan's realized how the two did not fully hide it, including Sandoval dressing up as Raquel for halloween when she was wearing a Tom Tom hoodie and having matching lightning bolt necklaces, in which Leviss got from a West Hollywood designer named Caitlin Diina.

Scandoval became a major cultural moment for Vanderpump Rules due to the shock value of Sandoval's actions and how Ariana and Tom were together for so long and seen as the "it" couple at the time. The affair also connected to a lot of people, despite the show having a lot of cheating scandals, due to Ariana's hurt and raw emotion (which includes a now infamous line from Madix, telling Sandoval "I regret ever loving you"), but also female empowerment, seeing a woman leaving her toxic group and bettering herself. Jamie Bliss from Coveteur wrote the following:

"Scandoval is both a story of betrayal that makes us, her closest friends and confidantes, question our own friends and lovers and a story of triumph—a superior woman loses the dead weight of a narcissistic man, and we get to witness just how brightly her (our) star can shine."

As of 2026, Scandoval is still in pop culture. On June 14, a TikTok user named popculther made an edit of Madix to the ABBA song 'The Winner Takes It All' with fellow Vanderpump castmates, including Sandoval, upset and annoyed with how successful and famous she became due to the affair he had, with cuts to Madix on Dancing With The Stars, her as Roxie in Chicago on Broadway, and as the host of Love Island. The TikTok has over 1 million likes as of June 23, 2026. A year before on April 29, 2025, YouTuber Ashley Norton made an almost 2 hour timeline of Scandoval, reaching 1.2 million views.

== Cast ==
=== Current ===
- Lisa Vanderpump: (2013–present) co-owner of SUR Restaurant & Lounge and TomTom Restaurant & Bar, and wife of Ken Todd
- Venus Binkley (2025)
- Jason Cohen (2025)
- Shayne Davis (2025)
- Chris Hahn (2025)
- Angelica Jensen (2025)
- Marcus Johnson (2025)
- Audrey Lingle (2025)
- Natalie Maguire (2025)
- Demy Selem (2025)
- Kim Suarez (2025)

=== Former ===
- Kristen Doute (2013–2020), a former server at SUR, owner of JamesMae, author
- Stassi Schroeder (2013–2020), a former server at SUR, podcast host, and author. Married to Beau Clark
- Jax Taylor (2013–2020), a former bartender at SUR, was married to Brittany Cartwright
- Katie Maloney (2013–2024), a former server at SUR, podcast host, co-owner of Something About Her
- Tom Sandoval (2013–2024), a former bartender at SUR, author, Lisa and Ken's business partner at Tom Tom
- Scheana Shay (2013–2024), a former server at SUR, podcast host, and aspiring singer and actress, married to Brock Davies
- Tom Schwartz (2013–2024), a former bartender at Pump, model and actor, Lisa and Ken's business partner at Tom Tom
- Ariana Madix (2013–2024), a former bartender at SUR, an author, co-owner of Something About Her
- James Kennedy (2014–2024), a former busboy at SUR, now DJ
- Lala Kent (2015–2024), a former hostess at SUR, author, podcast host
- Brittany Cartwright (2015–2020), a former server at SUR, was married to Jax Taylor
- Raquel Leviss (2017–2023), a former server at SUR who volunteered at Vanderpump Dogs
- Beau Clark (2018–2020), a casting agent, married to Stassi Schroeder
- Charli Burnett (2020–2023), a former server at SUR
- Max Boyens (2020), a former general manager at Tom Tom
- Brett Caprioni (2020), a former server at SUR and model
- Dayna Kathan (2020), a former hostess at Tom Tom and a former server at SUR
- Brock Davies (2021–2024), Scheana's husband

=== Recurring ===
- Ken Todd: co-owner of SUR Restaurant & Lounge and Tom Tom Restaurant & Bar, and husband of Lisa
- Kristina Kelly: a former server at SUR
- Peter Madrigal: a manager of SUR
- Mike Shay: Scheana's ex-husband
- Laura-Leigh: Jax's ex-girlfriend
- Vail Bloom: a former hostess at SUR
- Faith Stowers: a former server at SUR
- Robert Parks-Valetta: Scheana's ex boyfriend
- Jeremy Madix: Ariana's brother
- Brian Carter: Kristen Doute's ex-boyfriend
- Billie Lee: a former hostess at SUR
- Danica Dow: an assistant manager at SUR
- Randall Emmett: a film producer, father of Lala's child
- Ally Lewber: James Kennedy's girlfriend
- Jo Wenberg: Tom Schwartz's roommate

=== Timeline of cast ===
Cast member	Seasons											
Cast member	1	2	3	4	5	6	7	8	9	10	11	12
Current cast members
Lisa Vanderpump	Main	Main	Main	Main	Main	Main	Main	Main	Main	Main	Main	Main
Demy Selem								Guest	Guest	Guest	Guest	Main
Marcus Johnson										Guest	Guest	Main
Natalie Maguire											Guest	Main
Venus Binkley											Guest	Main
Jason Cohen												Main
Shayne Davis												Main
Chris Hahn												Main
Angelica Jensen												Main
Audrey Lingle												Main
Kim Suarez												Main
Former cast members
Scheana Shay	Main	Main	Main	Main	Main	Main	Main	Main	Main	Main	Main	
Katie Maloney	Main	Main	Main	Main	Main	Main	Main	Main	Main	Main	Main	
Tom Sandoval	Main	Main	Main	Main	Main	Main	Main	Main	Main	Main	Main	
Kristen Doute	Main	Main	Main	Main	Main	Main	Main	Main		Guest		
Jax Taylor	Main	Main	Main	Main	Main	Main	Main	Main			Guest	
Stassi Schroeder	Main	Main	Main	Recurring	Main	Main	Main	Main				
Tom Schwartz	Recurring	Recurring	Main	Main	Main	Main	Main	Main	Main	Main	Main	Guest
Ariana Madix	Guest	Recurring	Main	Main	Main	Main	Main	Main	Main	Main	Main	
James Kennedy		Guest	Recurring	Main	Main	Main	Main	Main	Main	Main	Main	
Lala Kent				Recurring	Recurring	Main	Main	Main	Main	Main	Main	
Brittany Cartwright				Guest	Recurring	Main	Main	Main			Guest	
Beau Clark							Recurring	Main				
Max Boyens							Guest	Main				
Dayna Kathan							Guest	Main			Guest	
Brett Caprioni								Main				
Raquel Leviss					Guest	Guest	Recurring	Recurring	Main	Main		
Charli Burnett								Recurring	Main	Recurring		
Brock Davies									Main	Guest	Recurring	
Recurring cast members
Peter Madrigal	Recurring	Recurring	Recurring	Recurring	Recurring	Guest	Guest	Guest	Guest	Guest		Guest
Kristina Kelly		Recurring	Guest	Guest	Guest	Guest	Guest			Recurring	Guest	
Vail Bloom			Recurring									
Billie Lee						Guest	Recurring				Guest	
Danica Dow							Guest	Recurring				
Ally Lewber										Recurring	Recurring	
Jo Wenberg											Recurring	

== Episodes ==
Season	Episodes	Originally released	
Season	Episodes	First released	Last released
1	10	January 7, 2013	March 11, 2013
2	17	November 4, 2013	February 25, 2014
3	21	November 3, 2014	March 23, 2015
4	24	November 2, 2015	April 11, 2016
5	24	November 7, 2016	April 17, 2017
6	25	December 4, 2017	May 28, 2018
7	24	December 3, 2018	May 20, 2019
8	24	January 7, 2020	June 16, 2020
9	17	September 28, 2021	January 26, 2022
10	19	February 8, 2023	June 14, 2023
11	19	January 30, 2024	May 29, 2024
12	14	December 2, 2025	March 10, 2026

== Broadcast history ==
Vanderpump Rules regularly airs on Bravo in the United States; most episodes are approximately 43 minutes in length and are broadcast in standard definition and high definition. Since its premiere, the series has alternated airing on Monday, Tuesday, and Wednesday evenings and has been frequently shifted between 8:00, 9:00, and 10:00 PM timeslots.
