= Jax Taylor =

American television personality and actor

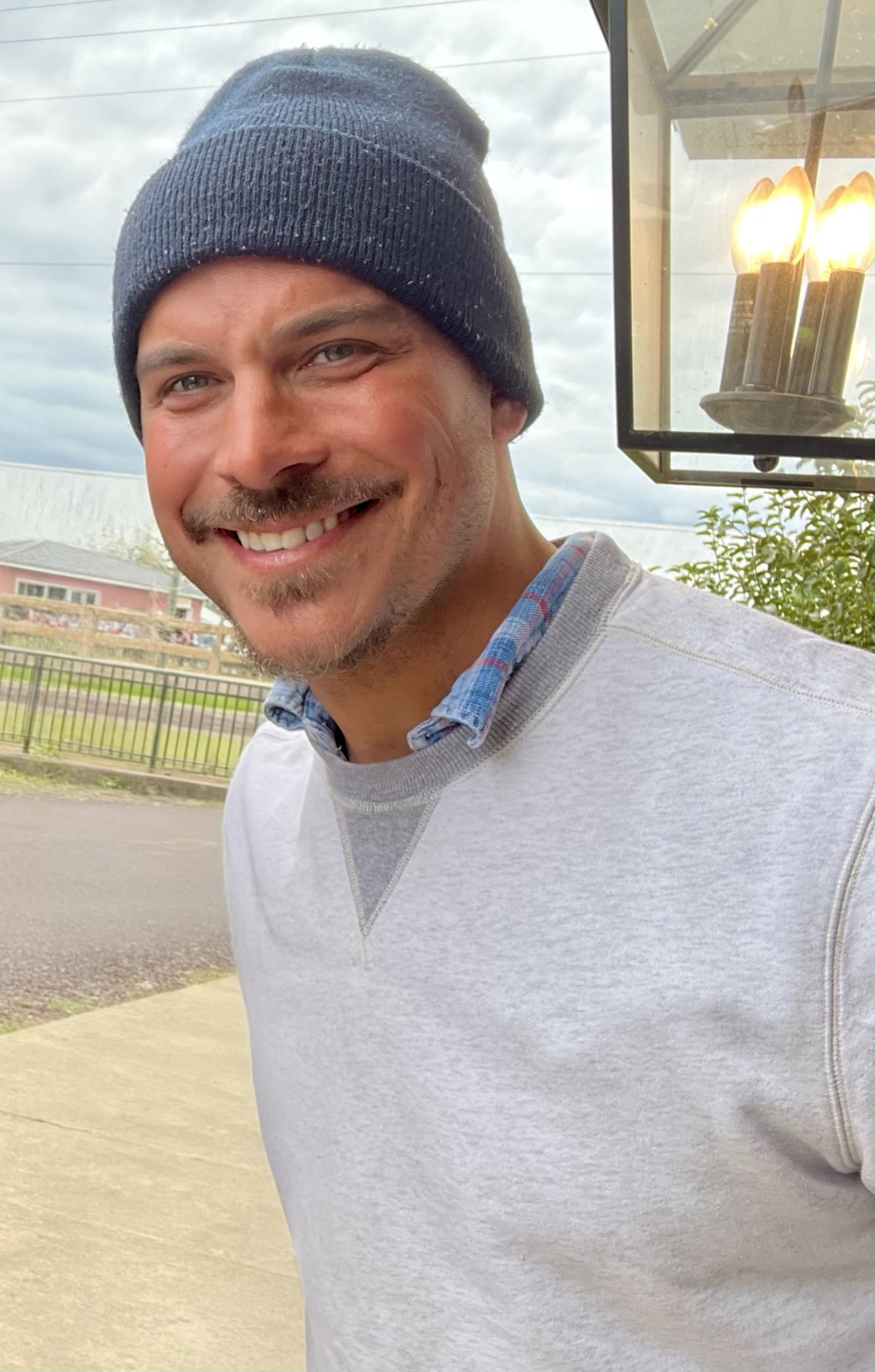
- Taylor in 2021
- Born: Jason Michael Cauchi; July 11, 1979 (age 47); Shelby Charter Township, Michigan, U.S.
- Occupations: Television personality, actor, model
- Television: Vanderpump Rules; Vanderpump Rules: Jax & Brittany Take Kentucky; The Valley
- Spouse: Brittany Cartwright (m. 2019; sep. 2024)
- Children: 1

Jason Michael Cauchi (born July 11, 1979), known professionally as Jax Taylor, is an American television personality, model, and actor. He was a main cast member of the Bravo reality television series Vanderpump Rules for its first eight seasons, leaving the series in 2020 and returning as a guest in 2024. He later starred in the first two seasons of the spin-off series The Valley from 2024 to 2025.

== Early life and education ==
Taylor graduated from Eisenhower High School in Shelby Township, Michigan in 1998. He attended Michigan State University and a community college before leaving school. He later served in the United States Navy and was stationed in Norfolk, Virginia.

== Career ==
=== Modeling ===
From 2002 to 2010, Taylor worked as a model, traveling between New York City and Europe. He signed with Ford Models and modeled for Abercrombie & Fitch.

=== Television ===
Taylor became a main cast member of Vanderpump Rules when the series premiered in 2013. He remained on the series through its eighth season and left in December 2020. In 2017, Taylor and Brittany Cartwright starred in the six-episode spin-off series Vanderpump Rules: Jax & Brittany Take Kentucky.

In 2023, Taylor competed on the first season of the E! reality competition series House of Villains. He returned to Vanderpump Rules as a guest during its eleventh season in 2024.

Taylor was among the original cast of The Valley, a Vanderpump Rules spin-off that premiered on March 19, 2024. He remained a main cast member through the second season. In July 2025, he announced that he would not return for the third season, saying that he intended to focus on his sobriety, mental health and coparenting. The third season premiered in April 2026 without him.

=== Business ventures ===
In October 2023, Taylor and Cartwright partnered with the owners of Rocco's Tavern to open the sports bar Jax's Studio City in Studio City, Los Angeles. In July 2025, Taylor ended his partnership with the bar.

=== Podcasting ===
Taylor and Cartwright launched When Reality Hits with Jax and Brittany in March 2023. In March 2025, Cartwright took over the podcast, ending Taylor's role as co-host. On March 13, PodcastOne launched Taylor's solo podcast, In The Mind of a Man with Jax Taylor. The podcast was later titled In The Mind Of Jax Taylor; Apple Podcasts lists its active year as 2025.

== Personal life ==
From 2010 to 2013, Taylor was in an on-and-off relationship with Vanderpump Rules co-star Stassi Schroeder.

Taylor met Kentucky-native Brittany Cartwright at a Las Vegas nightclub in 2015. Cartwright began appearing on Season 4 of Vanderpump Rules in a recurring capacity later that year and became a main cast member starting in Season 6. Taylor and Cartwright became engaged in 2018. They married on June 29, 2019, at the Kentucky Castle in Versailles, Kentucky. They have one son, born in April 2021.

On February 29, 2024, Cartwright announced that she and Taylor had separated and that she had moved into a separate residence. She filed for divorce on August 27, 2024, citing irreconcilable differences; court documents listed January 24, 2024, as their date of separation. In March 2026, Taylor and Cartwright reached an agreement for joint legal and physical custody of their son. Their divorce remained pending as of August 2026.

In July 2024, Taylor entered an inpatient facility for mental-health treatment. In September, he said that he had been diagnosed with bipolar II disorder and post-traumatic stress disorder.In March 2025, Taylor publicly said that he had struggled with cocaine addiction and had stopped using cocaine and alcohol.

On August 27, 2026, Cartwright obtained a temporary restraining order against Taylor after filing a request alleging domestic violence; a hearing was scheduled for September 17. Taylor disputed some of the allegations and said that he would comply with the court order.

On August 31, Taylor filed his own request for a restraining order against Cartwright, alleging harassment and interference with his employment. On September 1, a judge partially granted Taylor a temporary restraining order against Cartwright pending a September 24 hearing.

== Filmography ==
=== As actor ===
Year	Title	Role	Notes
2009	Desperate Housewives	Hot Guy 2 in Dance Club	Television series
2016	Sharknado: The 4th Awakens	Guardsman #2	Television film
2022	Savage Salvation	Good Ol' Boy	Film

=== As himself ===
Year(s)	Title	Notes
2013–2020, 2024	Vanderpump Rules	Main cast, seasons 1–8; guest, season 11
2015–2025	Watch What Happens Live!	Guest; multiple episodes
2017	Vanderpump Rules: Jax & Brittany Take Kentucky	Main cast
2023	House of Villains	Contestant, season 1
2024–2025	The Valley	Main cast, seasons 1–2

=== Podcasts ===
Year(s)	Title	Role	Notes
2023–2025	When Reality Hits with Jax and Brittany	Co-host	PodcastOne
2025	In The Mind Of Jax Taylor	Host	PodcastOne; launched as In The Mind of a Man with Jax Taylor
