= Vanderpump Rules After Show =

Television series

- Genre: Reality talk show
- Presented by: Julie Goldman; Brandy Howard
- Country of origin: United States
- Original language: English
- No. of seasons: 1
- No. of episodes: 12

Production
- Running time: 23 minutes
- Production company: Evolution Media

Original release
- Network: Bravo
- Release: November 16, 2015 – March 14, 2016

Related
- The Real Housewives of Beverly Hills; Vanderpump Rules

Vanderpump Rules After Show is an American reality talk show that premiered on Bravo on November 16, 2015. It was developed as the first spin-off of Vanderpump Rules.

== Overview ==
Vanderpump Rules features Lisa Vanderpump, one of the main original cast members of The Real Housewives of Beverly Hills, in the title role and the staff at her restaurants SUR Restaurant & Lounge and Pump Restaurant located in West Hollywood, California, both of which are owned, or co-owned, by Vanderpump. Vanderpump Rules After Show features conversations between the cast members of Vanderpump Rules discussing the same week's events and answering questions about their lives both on and off the show. The talk show is hosted by Julie Goldman and Brandy Howard.

The series, which premiered airing concurrent to season four of Vanderpump Rules, didn't return to air concurrent to season 5 of the series, nor has it aired any further episodes online.

== Episodes ==
No.	Title	Original release date	U.S. viewers (millions)
1	"After Show #1"	November 6, 2015	0.35
2	"After Show #2"	November 13, 2015	0.4
3	"After Show #3"	November 20, 2015	0.45
4	"After Show #4"	November 23, 2015	0.52
5	"After Show #5"	November 30, 2015	0.47
6	"After Show #6"	December 7, 2015	0.52
7	"After Show #7"	December 14, 2015	0.45
8	"After Show #8"	December 21, 2015	0.41
9	"After Show #9"	February 22, 2016	0.82
10	"After Show #10"	February 29, 2016	0.58
11	"After Show #11"	March 7, 2016	0.77
12	"After Show #12"	March 14, 2016	0.81

== Broadcast ==
Vanderpump Rules After Show airs on the Bravo cable network in the United States; the first episode premiered on Friday at 9:00/8:00pm ET/PT. on November 6, 2015. Two subsequent episodes aired in the same timeslot. Starting with the fourth episode which aired November 23, the show moved to 11:30/10:30pm timeslot on Monday, the same night when Vanderpump Rules airs. Internationally, the series premiered in Australia on Arena on November 24, 2015, within hours of the American broadcast.
