= List of Summer House (2017 TV series) episodes =

Summer House is an American reality television series broadcast on Bravo since January 9, 2017. The following is a list of episodes of the series. It has aired ten seasons and focuses on a group of friends who share a summer house in the Hamptons town of Southampton, New York. The success of the show has resulted in three spin-offs: Winter House, Summer House: Martha's Vineyard, and In the City.

== Series overview ==
| Season | Episodes | Originally released | |
| Season | Episodes | First released | Last released |
|---|---|---|---|
| 1 | 10 | January 9, 2017 | March 13, 2017 |
| 2 | 12 | January 22, 2018 | April 3, 2018 |
| 3 | 14 | March 4, 2019 | June 3, 2019 |
| 4 | 16 | February 5, 2020 | May 13, 2020 |
| 5 | 14 | February 4, 2021 | May 6, 2021 |
| 6 | 17 | January 17, 2022 | May 16, 2022 |
| 7 | 17 | February 13, 2023 | June 5, 2023 |
| 8 | 17 | February 22, 2024 | June 13, 2024 |
| 9 | 18 | February 12, 2025 | June 11, 2025 |
| 10 | 20 | February 3, 2026 | June 16, 2026 |

== Episodes ==
=== Season 1 (2017) ===
Kyle Cooke, Cristina Gibson, Lindsay Hubbard, Stephen McGee, Carl Radke, Jaclyn Shuman, Everett Weston, Ashley Wirkus and Lauren Wirkus are introduced as cast members.

| No. overall | No. in season | Title | Original release date | U.S. viewers (millions) |
|---|---|---|---|---|
| 1 | 1 | "Summer House" | January 9, 2017 | 0.84 |
Summer is here, which for this group of friends, means it's time to escape the rat race of NYC and jet out to the Hamptons. They've rented a weekend house in Montauk, and this year they've put together the perfect group... that is, if they don't let the drama of living together get the best of them. Twins Ashley and Lauren invite their LA friend Stassi out to see the new digs, but she's got her sights on their roommate Kyle. Meanwhile, long-time friends Everett and Lindsay shock everyone by shacking up, and new guy Carl plays the field...and maybe Lauren's heartstrings.
| 2 | 2 | "Codependence Day" | January 16, 2017 | 0.63 |
It's America's birthday, and what better way to celebrate than rosé all day! This 4th of July, there are fireworks in and out of the house as Lauren and Carl's relationship heats up in the bedroom, while Kyle juggles two girls at one party. Meanwhile, "love birds" Everett and Lindsay prove to be anything but the perfect couple, as their explosive antics dash any hopes for a drama-free summer.
| 3 | 3 | "Flirting with Disaster" | January 23, 2017 | 0.53 |
After their epic meltdown in the hot tub, Kyle confronts “perfect couple” Everett and Lindsay for disrupting his “single” summer. Speaking of single, new house guest Jaclyn raises eyebrows with her Southern sensibility...or lack thereof. Meanwhile, Carl gets caught in a lie that threatens his new relationship with Lauren.
| 4 | 4 | "The Wrath of Wirkus" | January 30, 2017 | 0.62 |
It’s Wedding-Gate in the Summer House as Lauren confronts Carl for lying about bringing a date to a wedding. Kyle dips his toe back into the ex-pool, despite everyone’s warnings. And Lindsay and Cristina’s roommate drama boils over into full-on name calling and accusations at a lavish Hampton’s party.
| 5 | 5 | "Wine, Whining, and Wieners" | February 6, 2017 | 0.59 |
When the roommates go to a winery, there is more "whine" than wine. As the drama between Lindsay and Cristina reaches its breaking point, someone may be evicted from the Summer House. Meanwhile, Carl cools off on Lauren but warms up to Jaclyn at a beach bonfire full of wieners and innuendo.
| 6 | 6 | "Model Behavior" | February 13, 2017 | 0.61 |
The roommates go from blowing out candles for Kyle’s birthday surprise to a blowout fight that derails everyone’s good time and leave Lindsay and Everett on the brink of a breakup. Meanwhile, at Model Volleyball, Cristina serves up some juicy gossip that Jaclyn hasn’t been a model friend to Lauren. And at long last, the Wirkus parents meet the infamous Carl.
| 7 | 7 | "Hoedown Showdown" | February 20, 2017 | 0.67 |
It's Lindsay's 30th birthday hoedown, and trouble's abrewing when Carl brings two uninvited girls to the party, much to Lauren's dismay. Meanwhile, Everett and Lindsay are on the outs, and Stephen spills a secret that may make the "on and off" again couple turn the switch off permanently.
| 8 | 8 | "Sprained Relationships" | February 27, 2017 | 0.67 |
With a scandalous secret looming over Lindsay and Everett's relationship, the pressure is on for the power couple to sink or swim. The roommates must come together to throw a race for charity, but not everyone will make it out in one piece. And finally, Cristina's meddling catches up to her when Lauren and Jaclyn go on the attack.
| 9 | 9 | "The No Good, Very Bad Rosé Day" | March 6, 2017 | 0.64 |
As if there hasn’t been enough rosé this summer, it’s time for the annual Rosé Party, where Kyle meets a fellow blonde babe who may or may not be his drunken soul mate. And it’s Cristina vs. everyone else, as the roommates take aim at her meddling ways.
| 10 | 10 | "Winter is Coming" | March 13, 2017 | 0.62 |
Summer's over, and that means one last wild weekend with no regrets...or maybe a few. A Hamptons White Party turns into a messy affair when Kyle blows up at his ex-girlfriend Amanda over a lip-syncing scandal. Meanwhile, Cristina makes a dramatic exit, and Carl and Lauren's romantic pretzel twists one final time, when Carl disappears into the night.

=== Season 2 (2018) ===
Amanda Batula, Amit Neuman and Danielle Olivera join the main cast.

| No. overall | No. in season | Title | Original release date | U.S. viewers (millions) |
|---|---|---|---|---|
| 11 | 1 | "Passing the Torch" | January 22, 2018 | 0.68 |
The work hard/party harder gang is back for another summer in a brand new weekend house in the Hamptons with some familiar faces and surprising changes. Newly single Lindsay happily passes the “house couple” torch to Kyle and Amanda and two new friends join the group to make the summer family complete. Things get off to a rocky start when room selections occur without everyone’s input and tempers flare even worse when the house kickoff dinner turns ice cold. Then as Stephen prepares to attend Gay Pride back in the city he struggles with a decision to invite Carl for support. Meanwhile, Lindsay enjoys her freedom by having her way with a man on horseback at a polo event, as Lauren and new housemate, Danielle, navigate their complicated feelings about sharing a summer house with their common ex, Carl.
| 12 | 2 | "Stars and Gripes" | January 29, 2018 | 0.67 |
The second weekend of the summer is a big one and the crew prepares for their big July 4 bash. Kyle and Amanda talk about the next steps for their relationship while Carl and Lauren struggle with unresolved feelings. But when Danielle drops a bomb during a girls’ day, everything comes to a head as the crew celebrates the country’s independence in glorious fashion.
| 13 | 3 | "Bonfire Insanity" | February 5, 2018 | 0.66 |
Tensions are running high in the house after the craziness of the 4th of July party, and Lindsay finds herself in the middle of the drama after Lauren’s cake-to-Carl’s-face meltdown. The crew sets off for a sunset sail and beach bonfire, where these tensions boil over into drama of epic proportions. After a short-but-busy week at work, the housemates return the Hamptons, where Kyle and Amanda’s relationship faces setbacks. In an effort to smooth over all the rifts and tension in the house, Danielle gains her housemates access to a very special place in the Hamptons with hopes that it will bring them all back to harmony.
| 14 | 4 | "Don't Poke the Bear" | February 12, 2018 | 0.58 |
With the summer house finally back to its free-spirited, hard partying ways, Amanda begins to show her frustration with Kyle’s continued boozy behavior and decides to let him have a weekend to himself. Lindsay gets in touch with her ex, Everett after failing to forget about him. Meanwhile, Lauren and Carl appear to have moved past the fiasco from the 4th and are back to being friends (with benefits) but Danielle continues to be an unwelcome third party in their relationship.
| 15 | 5 | "Smashelorette" | February 19, 2018 | 0.64 |
Lauren's twin sister, Ashley, is back in the Hamptons for their older sister's bachelorette weekend and she is not happy to see how cozy Carl and Lauren have gotten. Lindsay goes on her first date since Everett with a hot younger man. Kyle takes a big step with Amanda during a romantic dinner. And Stephen finally puts his issues with Carl out on the table.
| 16 | 6 | "Mother Knows Best" | February 26, 2018 | 0.63 |
Before Carl and Stephen resolve the bomb that fractured their friendship in the city, the gang hosts several housemates' moms for the weekend in the Hamptons. Despite everyone being on their best behavior, things soon go off the rails when Lauren calls Carl out on his dishonesty. Lindsay tries to be a good friend and play peacemaker while Kyle braces for his mother officially meeting Amanda’s mother and gets nervous about this step being bigger than he anticipated.
| 17 | 7 | "The Exes Are Coming" | March 5, 2018 | 0.45 |
The moms' weekend comes to a close with a revealing game before the gang all heads back to the city. Everyone returns to the Hamptons ready to celebrate Kyle’s birthday weekend. Carl and Lauren clear the air of all the past weekend’s drama, Stephen goes on a blind date, and Danielle has a houseguest. Everything kicks into high gear when Kyle’s “revolutionary" 35th birthday party gets officially sent as Lindsay anxiously awaits the arrival of a very special guest.
| 18 | 8 | "Say It with Flowers" | March 12, 2018 | 0.65 |
Kyle's birthday party ends with a disruption from Lindsay. The gang goes back to the city hustle but when they return for Lindsay’s "Hubbana Nights" party, Stephen visits his family in Alabama instead, hoping to confront some painful issues.
| 19 | 9 | "Summer Should Be Fun!" | March 19, 2018 | 0.67 |
Kyle and Amanda’s relationship feels the strain of existing in the house while Lindsay attempts to get her single summer back on track and Lauren moves on from Carl with a few new prospects. Back from Alabama, Stephen is ready to take his fling more seriously but struggles with mixed signals and Carl asks for permission to let a new love interest spend the night.
| 20 | 10 | "A House Divided" | March 26, 2018 | 0.64 |
Kyle and Amanda decide to try out a new plan in hopes of repairing their ever-growing rift but it might be too little too late. Carl chooses to put his cards on the table with his latest lady friend, while Lindsay has some shocking news for Everett. Lauren’s twin Ashley returns and sees some welcome changes in her sister. Meanwhile, the entire house blows off a massive amount of steam at a Hamptons rose bash!
| 21 | 11 | "Lei It to Rest" | April 2, 2018 | 0.67 |
It's the final weekend of summer and the house throws a massive blow-out luau .Ashley's husband arrives from California just as everyone is at odds with each other. Carl and Stephen confront their unresolved issues. And Kyle and Amanda are under tremendous strain from their housemates who have had enough of their drama.
| 22 | 12 | "Reunion" | April 3, 2018 | 0.65 |
The gang sit down with Andy Cohen to discuss season two shenanigans and everything that went down on and off screen.

=== Season 3 (2019) ===
Hannah Berner, Paige DeSorbo and Jordan Verroi join the main cast.

| No. overall | No. in season | Title | Original release date | U.S. viewers (millions) |
|---|---|---|---|---|
| 23 | 1 | "Elephant in the Room" | March 4, 2019 | 0.58 |
The housemates return to the Hamptons with several new friends in tow. But before long, there’s trouble in paradise. Unresolved issues between Kyle, Lindsay and Danielle quickly spread through the house, leading their new housemates to question their decisions to join the summer share. Meanwhile, Carl vows to focus on his work and never hook up with a summer share housemate again.
| 24 | 2 | "Cloudy with a Chance of Arguments" | March 11, 2019 | 0.57 |
Tensions come to a head during a trip to the beach. Kyle and Amanda discuss moving in together. Carl struggles with meeting his sales quota. The house prepares for their annual Fourth of July Party, and Jordan flirts with both Danielle and Lindsay.
| 25 | 3 | "Firework Starter" | March 18, 2019 | 0.56 |
Fireworks continue as the 4th of July party winds down. Danielle gets a taste of Jordan, but after their tryst, he sets his eyes on Paige. Lindsay reconnects with Everett. Kyle and Amanda work together on their new startup. At Girls Night, the ladies break the news of Jordan’s true feelings to Danielle.
| 26 | 4 | "Pantry Passion" | March 25, 2019 | 0.56 |
Danielle forgives Jordan but he continues to wreak havoc in the house, leading his housemates to question who he really is. Kyle makes a romantic gesture to woo Amanda. While the rest of the house visits a vineyard, Hannah attends her Grandfather's 90th birthday party. Meanwhile, Carl and Paige's growing flirtation leads Carl to violate his cardinal Summer House rule.
| 27 | 5 | "The Grapes of Wrath" | April 1, 2019 | 0.57 |
Jordan continues to offend his housemates. Carl offers advice, but it may be too late for this "southern gentleman." Carl tries to push his relationship forward with Paige; however Paige isn’t sure Carl checks off all her boxes. Lingering emotions between Kyle and Amanda lead to a fight where Amanda admits that she has cold feet when it comes to moving in together and she issues a tough ultimatum.
| 28 | 6 | "Swimming Uphill" | April 8, 2019 | 0.56 |
Kyle forges a new path for himself and Amanda by finally making changes to his behavior. Carl and Paige go on a date in the city, but Paige still isn’t sure if Carl is marriage material. Hannah confronts Lindsay about her backhanded compliments regarding her femininity. The house heads to a swanky St. Barth’s Party in the Hamptons and the girls flirt it up!
| 29 | 7 | "Epic Grand Gesture" | April 15, 2019 | 0.54 |
The house throws a Christmas in July party and exchanges secret Santa gifts, but Kyle has a special present for Amanda. Hannah invites her British beau to the party and he brings a friend for Paige, but Danielle’s the one who makes the Christmas connection. Carl vies for Paige’s attention but she ignores his advances, and he goes one step too far.
| 30 | 8 | "Ring Around the Rumor" | April 22, 2019 | 0.55 |
During the Christmas in July Party, Carl laments to Lindsay about his frustrations with Paige. However, Lindsay’s advice is overheard, setting off a chain reaction among the girls in the house. As Kyle prepares to ask Amanda to take their relationship to the next level, another cheating rumor surfaces.
| 31 | 9 | "Rumors Gone Wild" | April 29, 2019 | 0.57 |
While Kyle is at his family reunion, Amanda plays single with Paige and Hannah. Danielle confronts Jordan about their tension and possibly uncovers a secret. Lindsay confides in Danielle about another scandalous rumor, only for Danielle to end up spilling the tea to Paige. Amanda, Kyle and their housemates celebrate Kyle's 36th birthday at a Monte Carlo night.
| 32 | 10 | "True or False" | May 6, 2019 | 0.62 |
Lindsay confronts Kyle about the shocking rumor and he subsequently tells Amanda the real story. Meanwhile, Carl's mom comes to town to surprise him. The housemates continue to wonder about what secret Jordan may be hiding. After Amanda ignores Kyle all week, he desperately waits outside of her office to confront her.
| 33 | 11 | "Wing-mom" | May 13, 2019 | 0.62 |
Carl's mom comes to the summer house and delights Paige, and Hannah finally takes the next step with British Dave. In an effort to move on from Everett, Lindsay goes on a date with Peyman. Meanwhile, Jordan finally tells his housemates what he's been hiding. Amanda and Kyle move on from the cheating scandal until Amanda's parents make her rethink her decision to stay with Kyle.
| 34 | 12 | "Pumped Up" | May 20, 2019 | 0.59 |
Jordan finally meets a girl he'd bring home to mom and Kyle is unimpressed when Paige finally sleeps in Carl's bed without Carl. Additionally, Kyle's coupled-up LA buds Stassi, Beau, Katie, and Tom, pay the house a visit and Stassi tries to help Lindsay see she deserves better from men. The houseguests witness tension coming to a fiery head between Carl and Paige, as they argue over who misled whom.
| 35 | 13 | "The Cookie Crumbles" | May 27, 2019 | 0.61 |
The Vanderpumps continue their visit at the Summer House and become bystanders in a house-wide divide when Kyle accuses Paige of leading Carl on... AGAIN. Hannah tears into Jordan about his lies. Carl brings a date to the house to spite Paige, and Tom has an emergency requiring a trip to the hospital. When Kyle reveals he's ready to propose to Amanda, Stassi cautions not to proceed in haste.
| 36 | 14 | "Will You Bury Me?" | June 3, 2019 | 0.55 |
It's the last weekend at the Summer House and the crew gets together for one more epic 'death of summer' party. Despite their undeniable attraction, Carl gets closer to Kristen, while Paige embraces being single. Kyle asks for Amanda's father's blessing for an engagement, but after getting a lukewarm response, begins to rethink his proposal to Amanda.

=== Season 4 (2020) ===
Jules Daoud and Luke Gulbranson join the main cast.

| No. overall | No. in season | Title | Original release date | U.S. viewers (millions) |
|---|---|---|---|---|
Special
| — | — | "I Know What You Did Last Summer(s)" | January 29, 2020 | 0.43 |
Kyle and his housemates are back and ready to “Send It!” in this half-hour special reflecting on their past three summers “share-housing” in the Hamptons.
Season
| 37 | 1 | "The Big Bang" | February 5, 2020 | 0.61 |
The summer starts off with a bang when Carl takes his friendship with Lindsay to the next level. While the returning housemates savor the juicy gossip, newbies Luke and Jules wonder what they’ve signed up for. Meanwhile, Kyle and Amanda are in a challenging place, making Paige and Hannah the house’s happiest couple. But, if male model/hockey coach Luke has his way, that could change quickly.
| 38 | 2 | "Mice Will Play" | February 12, 2020 | 0.60 |
With house parents Kyle and Amanda away at a family wedding, the kids are ready to run wild. Lindsay’s bestie Danielle joins the party, but before they can turn up, Lindsay needs to tell Danielle about hooking up with Carl. Meanwhile, hot new roomie Luke pulls out all the stops to court Hannah even though she’s looking for a commitment from another guy, forcing her to make a difficult decision.
| 39 | 3 | "Worst. Date. Ever." | February 19, 2020 | 0.58 |
As the house gears up for its annual Fourth of July party, Jules wants to be BFFs with Paige, while Luke more than ever to get into Hannah’s pants... Armand be damned. Meanwhile, Carl and Lindsay go on their first official date in the city, and it’s a full-blown disaster. But, the loudest boom of the weekend is Amanda slamming the door in Kyle’s face, setting him off.
| 40 | 4 | "Red, White and Ewwww" | February 26, 2020 | 0.57 |
The annual Fourth of July party is usually a high point of summer for Kyle and his trusty mullet wig, but things are so rocky with Amanda, the only love he might get is from Carl. Lindsay gives Hannah’s friend Armand the third degree while Luke steps up his effort to win Hannah’s affection. Meanwhile, Carl sours on his relationship with Lindsay but is too scared to end it.
| 41 | 5 | "Hamptons Vice" | March 4, 2020 | 0.58 |
Hannah invites her old pal Jordan for the weekend and the housemates are shocked to learn that he has a romantic history with someone in the house. When Hannah receives some news about Armand, it helps her make a decision about Luke. Before Carl can make a decision about Lindsay, another girl right under Lindsay’s nose offers temptation that might be too much for Carl to bear.
| 42 | 6 | "Caged Heat" | March 11, 2020 | 0.57 |
While Lindsay and Carl try to repair what’s left of their friendship, Luke and Hannah’s ongoing flirtation leads to their first date reaching new heights.Meanwhile, it’s a house divided for Girls’ and Guys’ Night. Jules comes at Amanda during a surprising game of Truth or Dare while Kyle tries to play peacemaker between Luke and Carl.
| 43 | 7 | "Love Her, Boy" | March 18, 2020 | 0.70 |
Kyle stuns Amanda with a shocking answer to a simple question. On the other hand, Luke revs up his courtship of Hannah with a motorcycle ride while Jules tries to break through a sexual roadblock. Carl and Lindsay, still at odds with each other, attempt to move forward with new flings of their own.
| 44 | 8 | "Exes and Oh-No's" | March 25, 2020 | 0.67 |
Kyle and Amanda's moms visit for the weekend, and the boys of Summer House are behaving badly. As Jordan stuns Jules after her attempt to heat up the bedroom, Luke shocks the house with his relationship status, while Carl still can't make things right with Lindsay.
| 45 | 9 | "Pledge Master, Beer Lord" | April 1, 2020 | 0.70 |
Kyle and Amanda turn the house into a petting zoo for Kyle’s frat-themed 37th birthday. Meanwhile, Paige laments her BFF Hannah falling under Luke’s spell. With Lindsay in Mexico, Carl invites his new fling to the house. Finally, a spat between Jules and Jordan escalates into a possible eviction.
| 46 | 10 | "Clique Bait" | April 8, 2020 | 0.67 |
As Kyle’s birthday party comes to an end, Jules wonders if her time at the house is coming to a screeching halt. With Hannah distracted by Luke, Paige and Amanda don’t hesitate to throw her under the bus. Meanwhile, Carl continues to spiral, and with Lindsay back in the Hamptons with her new fling for her birthday, she kicks off the celebration in murderous style.
| 47 | 11 | "A Birthday to Die For" | April 15, 2020 | 0.77 |
Lindsay turns the house into a crime scene for her murder mystery themed birthday, Paige is put in an uncomfortable position as tension between Hannah and Amanda escalates over Hannah’s involvement with Luke, who is still hung up on an ex. Meanwhile, Lindsay is over-the-moon excited when new beau Stephen takes the relationship to a new level which pushes Carl even closer to the edge, but Jules surprisingly swoops in to comfort him
| 48 | 12 | "Offensive Rebound" | April 22, 2020 | 0.66 |
A blast from the past and an unlikely source help ease Carl’s loneliness. When Hannah finally calls it quits with Luke, Paige and Amanda are thrilled to get their best friend back. However, things aren’t always what they appear, and an idyllic day trip to the orchard leaves a sour taste in everyone’s mouth. Meanwhile, a night of passion leaves one housemate feeling satisfied, but others feeling betrayed.
| 49 | 13 | "America's Roast Wanted" | April 29, 2020 | 0.73 |
Paige and Amanda confront Hannah about her steamy night that leaves them blindsided. Carl and Jules bond over their summer of relationship mishaps, while a new rumor about Carl and Danielle spreads through the house. Meanwhile, while defending Hannah’s hookup, Lindsay's harsh opinion puts her in Paige's sights. Finally, as the end of the summer nears, barbs are exchanged at the first-ever house roast, but not everybody can take the heat.
| 50 | 14 | "Rave Goodbye" | May 6, 2020 | 0.78 |
It’s the final weekend at the Summer House... but before the housemates celebrate with an epic end of summer rave, it’s a house divided for Kyle and Amanda’s bachelor and bachelorette festivities. Jules is blindsided when Danielle threatens to steal Carl’s attention, Luke hijacks Amanda’s spotlight, while Kyle confronts Carl about his recent issues. Finally, Paige attempts to mend Amanda and Hannah’s fractured friendship, but unfortunately some relationships are forever changed by the summer.
| 51 | 15 | "Reunion" | May 6, 2020 | 0.58 |
Andy Cohen hosts the Summer House reunion as part of Watch What Happens Live.
| 52 | 16 | "Secrets Revealed" | May 13, 2020 | 0.52 |
The Summer House crew continues to bring the heat in this never-before-seen footage from Season 4. From fiery flings to rocky relationships, get the inside scoop on moments you didn't see this season.

=== Season 5 (2021) ===
Ciara Miller joins the main cast.

| No. overall | No. in season | Title | Original release date | U.S. viewers (millions) |
|---|---|---|---|---|
Special
| — | — | "I Know What You Did Last Summer(s) 2021" | January 28, 2021 | 0.40 |
Kyle and his housemates are back and ready to "Send It!" in this half-hour special reflecting on their past four summers "share-housing" in the Hamptons. Join the housemates as they spill the tea about what they know everyone did last summer(s).
Season
| 53 | 1 | "Kiss and Don’t Tell" | February 4, 2021 | 0.62 |
The crew flees the city and moves into a new house in the Hamptons for six straight weeks together. While Lindsay is trying to take her relationship with boyfriend Stephen to the next level, Paige is taking her time to decide if Perry is the one for her. The housemates are baffled to learn that Luke is bringing a new girl to the house this summer. Only time will tell if Luke’s plan to juggle two girls under one roof is a good one.
| 54 | 2 | "Let the Good Times Roll" | February 11, 2021 | 0.54 |
Carl kicks off the first weekend and hosts a reception for his mom’s virtual wedding. Danielle throws a roller-skating party, but Lindsay is too bothered by Stephen having a job to enjoy herself. Afterward, the housemates get to work to throw Kyle an unforgettable birthday, which devolves into chaos when Hannah and Ciara’s budding friendship threatens Luke’s chances with either girl.
| 55 | 3 | "The Sandwich Between Us" | February 18, 2021 | 0.54 |
While the cold war between Luke and Hannah shows no signs of warming, Lindsay wonders if she is actually the priority in her relationship with Stephen. The housemates plan a nice family dinner to get back on track, but even the best laid plans have a way of devolving into chaos, leaving the house divided. Kyle assaults a bartender.
| 56 | 4 | "Trash Talk" | February 25, 2021 | 0.59 |
With the weekend finally upon them, the crew decides to let loose in an all-out mullet extravaganza. The debauchery continues when hit the beach for the first time this summer. Much to the chagrin of Paige and Amanda, Hannah and Luke reconcile. However, the real war begins when Kyle aggressively calls a house meeting to discuss chores.
| 57 | 5 | "Best Frenemies" | March 4, 2021 | 0.56 |
Luke thinks a flirtatious flower delivery will get his relationship with Ciara back on track, only to find himself deeper in the friendzone. Stephen attempts to cheer Lindsay up with a romantic birthday dinner that completely backfires. Meanwhile, Hannah and Amanda’s friendship takes a turn for the worse. Carl receives devastating news, and heads home to be with his family.
| 58 | 6 | "Power-Pointless" | March 11, 2021 | 0.61 |
Kyle is enraged to find his housemates have more laid-back plans for their Saturday night; Lindsay finally receives a grand gesture from Stephen; Carl returns from Pittsburgh to find the house in shambles.
| 59 | 7 | "Medium at Large" | March 18, 2021 | 0.52 |
Kyle tries to make amends with Hannah; Lindsay grapples with ending her relationship with Stephen; Rumours spread when Hannah receives an explosive tip from her psychic.
| 60 | 8 | "Crawl Me Maybe" | March 25, 2021 | 0.50 |
Lindsay and Luke's maybe-not-so-innocent friendship is called into question when Amanda and Paige confront them about the juicy hookup rumor; sparks fly between Ciara and Carl; the guys corner Luke and demand he account for his behaviour.
| 61 | 9 | "Should I Stay or Should I Go?" | April 1, 2021 | 0.42 |
A pub crawl devolves into a serious conflict between the boys, causing Luke to leave the house; Lindsay wonders if she made a mistake when she broke up with Stephen; Kyle surprises Amanda for their two-year engagement anniversary.
| 62 | 10 | "Couples Retreat" | April 8, 2021 | 0.40 |
With Stravy's return, the house is abuzz about Lindsay's chaotic relationship; Hannah and Danielle take phone relationships to the next level; Luke is blindsided by information about Hannah and Des; Paige questions her relationship with Perry.
| 63 | 11 | "Derby Days" | April 15, 2021 | 0.49 |
Lindsay decides it's time to take her relationship to the next level and make her ring size known; Carl throws a Derby-themed party, complete with a housemates horse race; Hannah finds herself in the hot seat.
| 64 | 12 | "Makeups and Breakups" | April 22, 2021 | 0.52 |
It's the final days at the house and to commemorate the end of summer, the housemates throw a wedding-themed party for Kyle and Amanda; Hannah, Paige and Ciara navigate their complicated friendships; Lindsay and Stravy continue their relationship.
| 65 | 13 | "Reunion Part 1" | April 29, 2021 | 0.54 |
Ciara, Luke and Hannah revisit the unraveling of their love triangle; Lindsay admits what Stravy was really doing in the house when he claimed to be working; the housemates confront Hannah about her recent statements in the press and on podcasts.
| 66 | 14 | "Reunion Part 2" | May 6, 2021 | 0.44 |

=== Season 6 (2022) ===
Andrea Denver, Mya Allen and Alex Wach join the cast.

| No. overall | No. in season | Title | Original release date | U.S. viewers (millions) |
|---|---|---|---|---|
Special
| — | — | "I Know What You Did Last Summer(s) 2022" | January 10, 2022 | N/A |
Season
| 67 | 1 | "Where's My Lover, Boy?" | January 17, 2022 | 0.61 |
| 68 | 2 | "Star-Spangled Drama" | January 24, 2022 | 0.54 |
| 69 | 3 | "Heartbreak in the Hamptons" | January 31, 2022 | 0.59 |
| 70 | 4 | "Charmed, I'm Not Sure" | February 7, 2022 | 0.48 |
| 71 | 5 | "Birthday Hex" | February 14, 2022 | 0.43 |
| 72 | 6 | "Summer Should Be Kinky" | February 21, 2022 | 0.43 |
| 73 | 7 | "One Basket, Too Many Eggs" | February 28, 2022 | 0.46 |
| 74 | 8 | "A Twisted Fairytale" | March 7, 2022 | 0.51 |
| 75 | 9 | "Happily Ever Never" | March 21, 2022 | 0.55 |
| 76 | 10 | "That's Not Amore!" | March 28, 2022 | 0.50 |
| 77 | 11 | "Hurricane Warning" | April 4, 2022 | 0.50 |
| 78 | 12 | "Playing with Fire" | April 11, 2022 | 0.46 |
| 79 | 13 | "Pre-nope" | April 18, 2022 | 0.50 |
| 80 | 14 | "Keep Prom and Carry On" | April 25, 2022 | 0.59 |
| 81 | 15 | "A Happy Sending" | May 2, 2022 | 0.61 |
| 82 | 16 | "Reunion Part 1" | May 9, 2022 | 0.68 |
| 83 | 17 | "Reunion Part 2" | May 16, 2022 | 0.58 |

=== Season 7 (2023) ===
Samantha Feher, Gabby Prescod and Chris Leoni join the main cast.

| No. overall | No. in season | Title | Original release date | U.S. viewers (millions) |
|---|---|---|---|---|
Special
| — | — | "I Know What You Did Last Summer(s) 2023" | February 6, 2023 | 0.18 |
Season
| 84 | 1 | "Star Spangled Feud" | February 13, 2023 | 0.60 |
| 85 | 2 | "A Line in the Sand" | February 20, 2023 | 0.45 |
| 86 | 3 | "A Cup of Loyaltea" | February 27, 2023 | 0.46 |
| 87 | 4 | "Pillow Talk" | March 6, 2023 | 0.48 |
| 88 | 5 | "The Hangover" | March 13, 2023 | 0.48 |
| 89 | 6 | "Panic at the Disco" | March 20, 2023 | 0.54 |
| 90 | 7 | "Rise and Wine" | March 27, 2023 | 0.46 |
| 91 | 8 | "Hazed and Confused" | April 3, 2023 | 0.39 |
| 92 | 9 | "Holy Cow, Kyle is 40" | April 10, 2023 | 0.53 |
| 93 | 10 | "Who Wears the Crazy Pants" | April 17, 2023 | 0.49 |
| 94 | 11 | "Pity Party" | April 24, 2023 | 0.58 |
| 95 | 12 | "Ring of Fire" | May 1, 2023 | 0.44 |
| 96 | 13 | "The Hangover" | May 8, 2023 | 0.50 |
| 97 | 14 | "(Don't) Let Them Eat Cake" | May 15, 2023 | 0.52 |
| 98 | 15 | "Welcome to the Jungle" | May 22, 2023 | 0.57 |
| 99 | 16 | "Reunion Part 1" | May 29, 2023 | 0.56 |
| 100 | 17 | "Reunion Part 2" | June 5, 2023 | 0.56 |

=== Season 8 (2024) ===
Jesse Solomon and West Wilson join the main cast.

| No. overall | No. in season | Title | Original release date | U.S. viewers (millions) |
|---|---|---|---|---|
| 101 | 1 | "Declaration of Codependence" | February 22, 2024 | 0.37 |
| 102 | 2 | "House of Cards" | February 29, 2024 | 0.41 |
| 103 | 3 | "Elephant on the Beach" | March 7, 2024 | 0.38 |
| 104 | 4 | "Runaway Bride" | March 14, 2024 | 0.47 |
| 105 | 5 | "The Camptons" | March 21, 2024 | 0.39 |
| 106 | 6 | "Start Your Engines" | March 28, 2024 | 0.44 |
| 107 | 7 | "Loverboy to Flower Boy" | April 4, 2024 | 0.45 |
| 108 | 8 | "Point Break" | April 11, 2024 | 0.45 |
| 109 | 9 | "Close Encounters" | April 18, 2024 | 0.48 |
| 110 | 10 | "The Parent Trap" | April 25, 2024 | 0.46 |
| 111 | 11 | "Witchin' and Bitchin'" | May 2, 2024 | 0.49 |
| 112 | 12 | "Rocking the Boat" | May 9, 2024 | 0.44 |
| 113 | 13 | "Excess Baggage" | May 16, 2024 | 0.46 |
| 114 | 14 | "From Dusk Till Donne" | May 23, 2024 | 0.48 |
| 115 | 15 | "Point of No Return" | May 30, 2024 | 0.54 |
| 116 | 16 | "Reunion Part 1" | June 6, 2024 | 0.50 |
| 117 | 17 | "Reunion Part 2" | June 13, 2024 | 0.57 |

=== Season 9 (2025) ===
Imrul Hassan and Lexi Wood join the main cast.

| No. overall | No. in season | Title | Original release date | U.S. viewers (millions) |
|---|---|---|---|---|
| 118 | 1 | "Uncharted Territory" | February 12, 2025 | 0.43 |
| 119 | 2 | "The Steaks Are High" | February 19, 2025 | 0.47 |
| 120 | 3 | "Battle of the Sexes" | February 26, 2025 | 0.41 |
| 121 | 4 | "Pink and the Blues" | March 5, 2025 | 0.43 |
| 122 | 5 | "Red Flags and Beach Bags" | March 12, 2025 | 0.48 |
| 123 | 6 | "Shipwrecked" | March 19, 2025 | 0.47 |
| 124 | 7 | "Toeing the Line" | March 26, 2025 | 0.46 |
| 125 | 8 | "Kicking and Screaming" | April 2, 2025 | 0.42 |
| 126 | 9 | "Breaking Bread" | April 9, 2025 | 0.44 |
| 127 | 10 | "Flirting with Disaster" | April 16, 2025 | 0.35 |
| 128 | 11 | "Blurred Tan Lines" | April 23, 2025 | 0.43 |
| 129 | 12 | "Pillow Fight" | April 30, 2025 | 0.36 |
| 130 | 13 | "Changing Tides" | May 7, 2025 | 0.34 |
| 131 | 14 | "The Ex Files" | May 14, 2025 | 0.34 |
| 132 | 15 | "Summer Scaries" | May 21, 2025 | 0.43 |
| 133 | 16 | "Reunion Part 1" | May 28, 2025 | 0.49 |
| 134 | 17 | "Reunion Part 2" | June 4, 2025 | 0.37 |
| 135 | 18 | "Under the Covers" | June 11, 2025 | 0.22 |

=== Season 10 (2026) ===
Mia Calabrese, KJ Dillard, Dara Levitan, Levi Sebree, Bailey Taylor, and The Bachelor Australia alum Ben Waddell join the main cast.

| No. overall | No. in season | Title | Original release date | U.S. viewers (millions) |
|---|---|---|---|---|
| 136 | 1 | "Red White and Nude" | February 3, 2026 | 0.45 |
| 137 | 2 | "Stoned Cold Truth" | February 10, 2026 | 0.41 |
| 138 | 3 | "Apology Dunes" | February 17, 2026 | 0.43 |
| 139 | 4 | "Heated Rivalry" | February 24, 2026 | 0.45 |
| 140 | 5 | "Summer Knights" | March 3, 2026 | 0.41 |
| 141 | 6 | "The Joke's on You" | March 10, 2026 | 0.45 |
| 142 | 7 | "Make Ups and Make Outs" | March 17, 2026 | 0.41 |
| 143 | 8 | "Sleeping on It" | March 24, 2026 | 0.49 |
| 144 | 9 | "Wrinkles & Rosé" | March 31, 2026 | 0.56 |
| 145 | 10 | "Tee Time" | April 7, 2026 | 0.54 |
| 146 | 11 | "Viva Las Hamptons" | April 14, 2026 | 0.47 |
| 147 | 12 | "Boys of Summer" | April 21, 2026 | 0.56 |
| 148 | 13 | "Ship Happens" | April 28, 2026 | 0.57 |
| 149 | 14 | "The Turntables Have Turned" | May 5, 2026 | 0.57 |
| 150 | 15 | "Full House" | May 12, 2026 | 0.55 |
| 151 | 16 | "Ski Ya Later" | May 19, 2026 | 0.60 |
| 152 | 17 | "Reunion Part 1" | May 26, 2026 | 0.93 |
| 153 | 18 | "Reunion Part 2" | June 2, 2026 | 0.88 |
| 154 | 19 | "Reunion Part 3" | June 9, 2026 | 0.74 |
| 155 | 20 | "The Aftermath" | June 16, 2026 | 0.68 |
