= Catania (surname) =

Catania is an Italian surname. Notable people with the surname include:

- A. Charles Catania (born 1936), American psychologist
- Antonio Catania (born 1952), Italian actor
- David Catania (born 1968), American politician and lawyer
- Dolores Catania (born 1970), American television personality and cast member of The Real Housewives of New Jersey
- Emanuele Catania (born 1988), Italian long jumper
- Emanuele Catania (footballer) (born 1981), Italian football player
- Martina Catania (born 1999) Italian Buddhist nun
- Frank Catania (born 1941), American politician
- Giusto Catania (born 1971), Italian politician
- Jim Catania (born 1954), American drummer
- Kenneth C. Catania (born 1965), American neuroscientist
- Léa Catania (born 1993), French synchronized swimmer
- Mario Catania (born 1952), Italian minister of agriculture from 2011 to 2013
- Nick Catania (born 1945), former Australian politician
- Steve Catania, Australian politician
- Susan Catania (1941–2023), American politician
- Vince Catania (born 1977), Australian politician
- Yuri Catania (born 1975), Italian photographer and film director
