= Andrea Denver =

Italian fashion model

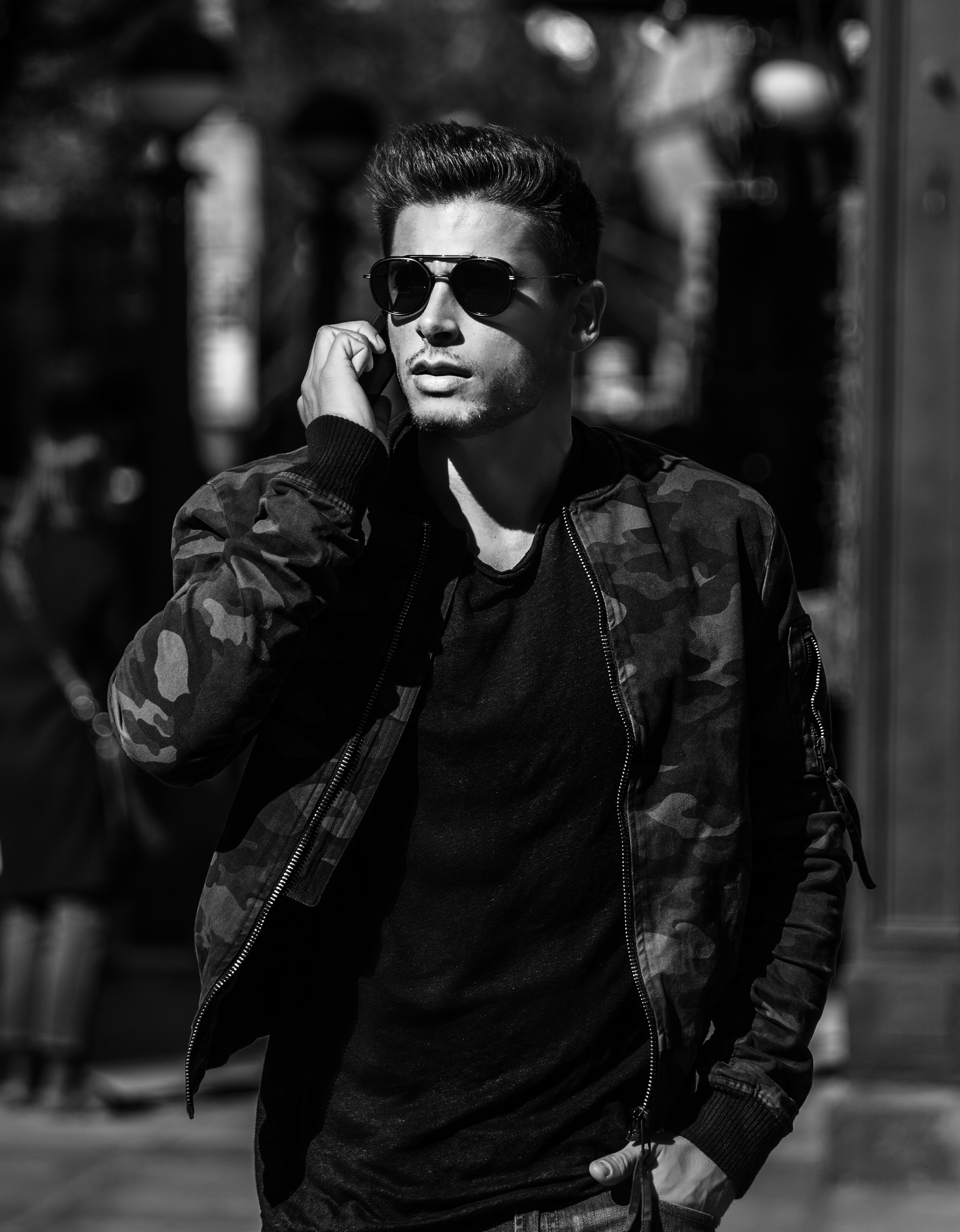
- Born: Andrea Salerno; May 3, 1991 (age 35); Verona, Italy
- Occupation: Fashion model
- Years active: 2014–present
- Spouse: Lexi Sundin (m. 2024)
- Modeling information
- Agency: Marilyn Agency New York; Marilyn Agency Paris; Two Management - Los Angeles; Next Models – Miami; Next – London; Uno Barcelona-Madrid; D’Management – Milan
- Website: https://www.andreadenver.com

Andrea Salerno (born May 3, 1991), known professionally as Andrea Denver, is an Italian fashion model based in New York City.

== Early life ==
Denver was born in Verona, Italy, in 1991 as Andrea Salerno. He studied for a degree in Communication Science at the University of Verona, graduating in 2013. Denver has a degree in communication from the University of Verona.

In 2014, he moved to the United States to study for a master's degree in communication. While in Miami, he was first scouted and signed by Wilhelmina Models. He garnered attention after featuring in Jennifer Lopez's "I Luh Ya Papi" and Taylor Swift's "Blank Space", and following rumors of a relationship with pop singer Madonna.

In September 2019, he appeared in the British Television series The Circle on Channel 4 as a potential contestant during Episode 16.

In 2020, he took part in the fourth edition of Grande Fratello VIP, the Italian celebrity version of Big Brother (franchise). He reached the final episode, where he was eliminated, narrowly missing out on a place in the final.

In 2021, Denver appeared in the inaugural season of Bravo's Winter House, filmed in Vermont. He later joined the cast of Summer House as a main cast member for the sixth season, appeared in a friend of capacity for the seventh season, and as a guest star for the eighth and tenth season. In 2025 he returned to Bravo as a main cast member on his third show with the network, the new Summer House spin-off In the City (American TV series) set in New York City.

== Personal life ==
Between 2015 and 2018, he was nominated four consecutive times in "The Model of the Year Award - Social Media Star Men" on Models.com. On June 13, 2024, Andrea married his fiancé Lexi Sundin in Verona, Italy.

== Modeling career ==
Denver has featured in campaigns for Hugo Boss, MAC Cosmetics, Brooks Brothers, as well as Colcci. He has featured on the covers and editorials of Men's Health Serbia, Lui, L'Officiel Hommes, FourTwoNine, Paper, Risbel, Jon magazine, Adon magazine, Velvet, Marie Claire, Grazia, Glamour (magazine), People (magazine), Men's Health, and Lewis Magazine. He has runway modeled for brands Ralph Lauren and 2xist. He has also worked with fashion industry photographers Collier Schorr, Craig McDean, Rick Day, Arnaldo Anaya-Lucca, Yuri Catania and Brent Chua.

Denver was featured in the music video for Jennifer Lopez's "I Luh Ya Papi", as well as the music video for Taylor Swift's "Blank Space".

== Filmography ==
- The Circle (Channel 4, 2019), contestant
- Grande Fratello VIP (Canale 5, 2020), contestant
- Winter House (Bravo, 2021), main cast - Season 1
- Summer House (Bravo, 2022–24, 26), main cast - Season 6, recurring - Season 7, guest - Seasons 8 & 10
- Family Feud (ABC, 2022), contestant - episode 806, August 14, 2022
- In the City (American TV series) (Bravo, 2026), main cast - Season 1
- Watch What Happens Live with Andy Cohen (Bravo, 2021-2022), guest
- Today (American TV program) (NBC), 2023, guest
- KTLA Morning News (KTLA, 2026), guest
