= IHeartRadio Podcast Awards =

Podcast award hosted by iHeartRadio

iHeartRadio Podcast Award
- Current: 2020 iHeartRadio Podcast Awards
- Awarded for: Performance on podcast platforms, popularity among fans, and recognition in the podcasting industry, recognizing podcasters and podcast providers
- Country: United States
- First award: 2019
- Website: https://www.iheart.com/podcast-awards/

Television/radio coverage
- Network: iHeartRadio (2019–2021); LiveXLive (2020)

The iHeartRadio Podcast Awards is a podcast awards show that celebrates podcasts heard throughout the year across iHeartMedia radio stations nationwide and on iHeartRadio, iHeartMedia's digital music platform. Founded by iHeartRadio in 2019, the event recognizes the most popular podcasters and podcasts over the past year. Winners are chosen in a few categories by judges, but the majority of categories are voted on by fans through the iHeart Podcast Awards website and social media. The inaugural event was held on January 18, 2019, at the iHeartRadio Theater in Los Angeles.

== Overview ==
Fans vote on their favorite podcasts through the iHeart Podcast Awards website and social media over the course of a couple of months leading up to the ceremony. A panel of judges who are blue-ribbon podcast industry leaders determines the podcast winners of several of the categories.

== List of ceremonies ==
| Year | Date | Venue | Host city | Host(s) | Podcast of the Year winner | Broadcaster | Ref. |
|---|---|---|---|---|---|---|---|
| 2019 | January 18, 2019 | iHeartRadio Theater | Los Angeles | Lenard McKelvey Holly Frey Bobby Bones Mario Lopez | Slow Burn produced by Slate Magazine and hosted by Leon Neyfakh | iHeartRadio | |
| 2020 | January 17, 2020 | iHeartRadio Theater | Los Angeles | Will Ferrell | The Dropout produced by ABC News and hosted by Rebecca Jarvis | LiveXLive iHeartRadio | |
| 2021 | TBD | TBD | TBD | TBD | TBD | TBD | |
| 2026 | March 16, 2026 | Moody Theater | Austin, Texas | Ego Nwodim | Giggly Squad hosted by Paige DeSorbo and Hannah Berner | VEEPS iHeartRadio | |

== Award categories ==
The categories cover an array of genres, including fiction, religion and spirituality, music, and political podcasts. Categories voted on by judges are indicated with a double dagger (‡).

=== Current award categories ===
- Best Podcast of the Year (2019–present) ‡
- Best Comedy Podcast (2019–present)
- Best Crime Podcast (2019–present)
- Best Music Podcast (2019–present)
- Best News Podcast (2019–present)
- Best Sports & Recreation Podcast (2020–present)
- Best Overall Host – Male (2020–present)
- Best Overall Host – Female (2020–present)
- Best Business & Finance Podcast (2020–present)
- Best Pop Culture Podcast (2020–present)
- Best Food Podcast (2019–present)
- Best Wellness & Fitness Podcast (2019–present)
- Best History Podcast (2019–present)
- Best Kids & Family Podcast (2019–present)
- Best Fiction Podcast (2020–present)
- Best Science Podcast (2020–present)
- Best Technology Podcast (2020–present)
- Best Ad Read (2020–present)
- Best Political Podcast (2020–present)
- Best TV & Film Podcast (2020–present)
- Best Spanish Language Podcast (2020–present)
- Best Advice/Inspirational Podcast (2020–present)
- Best Beauty & Fashion Podcast (2020–present)
- Best Travel Podcast (2020–present)
- Best Spirituality & Religion Podcast (2020–present)
- Best Green Podcast (2020–present)
- Best Branded Podcast (2019–present) ‡

=== Past award categories ===
- Best Business & Entrepreneurship Podcast (2019)
- Best Entertainment & TV Podcast (2019)
- Best Curiosity (2019)
- Best Health & Fitness Podcast (2019)
- Best LGBTQ Podcast (2019)
- Most Bingeable (2019)
- Best Multi-Cultural Podcast (2019)
- Best Scripted Podcast (2019)
- Best Sports Podcast (2019)
- Best Science & Tech Podcast (2019)
- Breakout Podcast (2019) ‡

== Special awards ==
=== Podcast Innovator Award ===
- 2019: Marc Smerling
- 2020: Life Kit
- 2021: QCode
- 2022: Descript
- 2023: Ashley Flowers
- 2024: Rotten Mango
- 2025: Daniel Alarcón
- 2026: Hrishikesh Hirway

=== Podcast Pioneer Award ===
- 2019: NPR
- 2020: Tenderfoot TV's Payne Lindsey and Donald Albright
- 2021: TBD
- 2026: Terry Gross

=== Social Impact Award ===
- 2019: Ear Hustle
- 2020: 1619
- 2021: TBD
- 2026: Jay Shetty

== Multiple wins and nominations ==
Most wins (as of 2020)

| Rank | 1st – 3rd | | |
|---|---|---|---|
| Podcast | Conan O'Brien Needs A Friend | Reply All | The Breakfast Club |
| Total | 2 | | |

Most nominations (as of 2020)

| Rank | 1st | 2nd – 6th | | | | | 7th & 8th | |
|---|---|---|---|---|---|---|---|---|
| Podcast | Revisionist History | The Daily | The Joe Rogan Experience | Atlanta Monster | Slow Burn | Stuff You Should Know | Dirty John | The Ron Burgundy Podcast |
| Total | 5 | 4 | | | | | 3 | |

== Performance ==
| Year | Performers (chronologically) |
|---|---|
| 2019 | N/A |
| 2020 | Gavin DeGraw |
| 2021 | TBD |

== See also ==
- iHeartRadio Music Awards
- iHeartRadio Much Music Video Awards
- iHeartRadio Music Festival
