= Jordan Emanuel =

American model (born 1992)

- Emanuel in 2026
- Born: December 25, 1992 (age 33); Baltimore, Maryland, U.S.
- Education: University of Miami
- Occupations: Model, journalist
- Known for: Playboy's Playmate of the Year for 2019; Playmate of the Month for December 2018; Miss Black America New York 2018
- Website: www.jordanemanuel.me

Jordan Emanuel (born December 25, 1991) is an American model and journalist. Emanuel was Playboy's 2019 Playmate of the Year, Playmate of the Month for December 2018, and Miss Black America New York 2018. She is the third and last Black Playboy Bunny to become Playmate of the Year and is a co-founder of the non-profit Women With Voices.

== Life and career ==
Jordan Emanuel was born in Baltimore, Maryland on December 25, 1991 and raised in Basking Ridge, New Jersey. Emanuel received a degree from the University of Miami, triple majoring in Broadcast Journalism, Music Business, and Art History. After graduating, she moved to New York and pursued a career in journalism, contributing content to Hollywood Life and Bossip. She began modeling on a whim, posting "25 Days of Jordan" consecutively on social media, in celebration of her 25th birthday. She has modeled for brands including Rimmel and Cover Girl.

In March 2023, Emanuel joined the cast of the Bravo reality TV series, Summer House: Martha's Vineyard, which is a spin-off based on the original series, Summer House.

Emanuel appeared as one of the new cast members in the third season of Winter House, which premiered on October 24, 2023.

== Philanthropy ==
Jordan co-founded Women With Voices, a Brooklyn-based non-profit organization which provides communal supportive spaces and resources for women. Emanuel describes the mission as focused on "empowering others."
