= In the City (American TV series) =

- Genre: Reality television
- Starring: Lindsay Hubbard; Kyle Cooke; Amanda Batula; Danielle Olivera; Eoin Harvey; Andrea Denver; Lexi Sundin; Yvonne Najor; Nick Barber; Georgina Ferzli; Whitney Fransway; Kenny Martin; Gavin Moseley; Katie Arundel
- Country of origin: United States
- Original language: English
- No. of seasons: 1
- No. of episodes: 11

Production
- Executive producers: Steven Weinstock; Glenda Hersh; Lauren Eskelin; Jamie Jakimo; Lori Gordon; Tamara Najm Coudurier; Faith Gaskins
- Production locations: New York City, New York
- Production company: Truly Original

Original release
- Network: Bravo
- Release: May 19, 2026 – present

Related
- Summer House; Winter House

In The City is an American reality television series that premiered on May 19, 2026, on Bravo. Developed as a spin-off from Summer House, the series follows a group of friends who have spent their summers in the Hamptons taking on the realities of adult life in New York City.

== Overview ==
In The City was first teased by Bravo in September 2025 with Lindsay Hubbard, Kyle Cooke and Amanda Batula being announced as cast members after previously appearing on Summer House since 2017. The premise of the series is to showcase the Summer House housemates settling down in New York City and into adulthood, in a similar manner to The Valley.

=== Season 1 ===
Filming started in September 2025 and wrapped later that fall. Cameras went back up on April 9, 2026, to address Amanda Batula's relationship with Summer House co-star West Wilson. The reunion was taped on June 11, 2026. Arundel was not present at the taping.

On April 7, 2026, it was announced that In The City would premiere on May 19, 2026, with Hubbard, Cooke and Batula starring alongside previous Summer House cast members Danielle Olivera and Andrea Denver and new cast members Eoin Harvey, Lexi Sundin, Yvonne Major, Nick Barber, Georgina Ferzli, Whitney Fransway, Kenny Martin, and Gavin Moseley. Katie Arundel joined the series as a friend of. Despite appearing in promotional material, Arundel's appearances during the season were minimal.

In October 2026, the series was renewed for a second season.

=== Season 2 ===
On October 28, 2026, it was revealed that Batula, Denver, Harvey, Olivera, and Sundin were leaving the series after one season. The Bachelor alum Natasha Parker is expected to join the series alongside Reagan Barker, Barthelemy Jallet, Robert Morrison, and Brittany Whitfield.

== Cast ==
=== Timeline of cast members ===
Cast member	Seasons
Cast member	1
Katie Arundel	Main
Amanda Batula	Main
Nick Barber	Main
Kyle Cooke	Main
Andrea Denver	Main
Georgina Ferzli	Main
Whitney Fransway	Main
Eoin Harvey	Main
Lindsay Hubbard	Main
Kenny Martin	Main
Gavin Moseley	Main
Yvonne Najor	Main
Danielle Olivera	Main
Lexi Sundin	Main

== Episodes ==
=== Series overview ===
Season	Episodes	Originally released	
Season	Episodes	First released	Last released
1	11	May 19, 2026	July 28, 2026

=== Season 1 (2026) ===
In The City season 1 episodes
No. overall	No. in season	Title	Rating (18–49)	Original release date	US viewers (millions)
1	1	"Welcome to New York"	0.14	May 19, 2026	0.50
2	2	"Mothers and Milkmen"	0.16	May 26, 2026	0.47
3	3	"Mimosas and Mayhem"	0.11	June 2, 2026	0.42
4	4	"Sparks Fly"	0.08	June 9, 2026	0.40
5	5	"Trolley Off the Tracks"	0.09	June 16, 2026	0.35
6	6	"Knot So Simple"	0.08	June 23, 2026	0.37
7	7	"You Only Get Married Twice"	0.07	June 30, 2026	0.33
8	8	"Caught in the Crossfire"	0.07	July 7, 2026	0.36
9	9	"Cider and Squabbles"	0.10	July 14, 2026	0.43
10	10	"Reunion Part 1"	0.10	July 21, 2026	0.45
11	11	"Reunion Part 2"	0.09	July 28, 2026	0.44
