= Giggly Squad =

American podcast

The Giggly Squad is an American podcast hosted by comedian Hannah Berner and Paige Desorbo, which provides commentary on popular culture.

In 2026 Giggly Squad was awarded the "Top Podcast of the Year" by iHeartRadio. Berner and Desorbo are ranked 20 amongst top global podcaster earners by Forbes.

They are known for popularizing the "lazy girl" lifestyle, women in STEM, women in sports, and fashion, in addition to their commentary on contemporary American life.

The duo first met on the reality television cast of Summer House; Amy Poehler is producing their Netflix show expected to debut in fall 2026.

== Tours ==
In October 2026 the pair announced their second national tour, entitled "Gehls Gehls," which is set to begin January 2027.

Their previous tours were in 2022 and 2024.
