= Paige DeSorbo =

American television personality (born 1992)

- Born: November 4, 1992 (age 33); Albany, New York, U.S.
- Education: College of Saint Rose
- Occupations: Television personality; podcaster; influencer
- Years active: 2019–present
- Known for: Summer House; Giggly Squad

Paige DeSorbo (born November 4, 1992) is an American television personality, podcaster, and influencer. She is best known as a cast member of the Bravo reality television series Summer House, in which she starred from 2019 to 2025, and as a co-host of the podcast Giggly Squad.

== Early life ==
DeSorbo was born in Albany, New York, to Gary and Kimberly DeSorbo, and grew up in Loudonville. She has an older brother. She was a child model and appeared on the cover of the young-adult novel The Friday Society by Adrienne Kress. She attended Academy of the Holy Names and studied journalism at the College of Saint Rose in Albany, graduating in 2015.

== Career ==
Early in her career, DeSorbo interned at WRGB in Niskayuna. She later worked as an executive assistant at ABC News and a writer at Betches. In 2019, she joined the cast of the Bravo reality television series Summer House. In June 2025, she announced that she would be leaving Summer House after seven seasons. Later that year, she was awarded the Allison Williams Cool Girl Award at the Las Culturistas Culture Awards ceremony. She also launched a loungewear line, titled Daphne. In February 2026, she appeared in a Super Bowl LX commercial for Kinder Bueno.

=== Giggly Squad ===
During the COVID-19 pandemic, DeSorbo and her Summer House costar Hannah Berner began hosting a podcast, Giggly Squad. In late 2024, they toured their podcast with a live show titled Giggly Squad Live: Club Giggly. In April 2025, they published a book, How to Giggle: A Guide to Taking Life Less Seriously. The following month, they launched a web series titled Hannah & Paige Try New Things.

In March 2026, Giggly Squad won Podcast of the Year at the 2026 IHeartRadio Podcast Awards. Later that month, it was announced that Berner and DeSorbo will co-write and act in a scripted comedy series developed by Netflix and produced by Amy Poehler with Kay Cannon as co-writer and showrunner.

== Personal life ==
DeSorbo was in a relationship with Perry Rahbar from 2019 to 2020. She was in a relationship with Southern Charm star Craig Conover from 2021 to 2024.

In September 2026, DeSorbo partnered with St. Jude Children's Research Hospital to launch a limited-edition t-shirt supporting Childhood Cancer Awareness Month.

== Filmography ==
Year	Title	Notes	Ref.
2019–2025	Summer House	Main cast	
2021–2022	Winter House	Main cast	
2021–2025	Watch What Happens Live with Andy Cohen	Guest; 11 episodes	
2022–2025	Southern Charm	Guest; 24 episodes	
2025	The Tonight Show Starring Jimmy Fallon	Guest; 1 episode	
2025	The Drew Barrymore Show	Guest; 1 episode	
2025	Love Island USA	Guest presenter; 1 episode	
2026	The Devil Wears Prada 2	Cameo appearance	
2026	Not Suitable for Work	Cameo appearance; 1 episode	

== Bibliography ==
- Berner, Hannah; DeSorbo, Paige (2025). How to Giggle: A Guide to Taking Life Less Seriously. Simon Element. ISBN 978-1668056004.
