= Hannah Berner =

American comedian (born 1991)

- Berner performing in 2025
- Born: Hannah Lucy Berner; August 12, 1991 (age 35); Brooklyn, New York
- Education: University of Wisconsin (B.A.)
- Occupation: Stand-up comedian
- Spouse: Des Bishop (m. 2022)
- Website: hannahberner.com

Hannah Lucy Berner (born August 12, 1991) is an American comedian, television personality, podcast host, and author. She is best known for her and Paige DeSorbo's podcast Giggly Squad and her Netflix special We Ride At Dawn. She also appeared on Summer House.

== Early life ==
Berner was born and raised in Park Slope, Brooklyn, New York City (except for two years she spent in Florida in her teens, where she trained for a professional tennis career). Her mother is Lenore DiLeo Berner, a jazz singer and a former principal at MS51 (William Alexander Middle School in Brooklyn). Her father, Dan Berner, is a Lubin School of Business graduate. She has a younger brother named Daniel.

She attended the Beacon School and then the University of Wisconsin, where she played tennis and pursued a bachelor's degree in communication arts rhetoric with a certificate in gender and women's studies.

== Career ==
Early in Berner's career, she worked at the digital media company Betches. Then, she appeared on seasons 3 through 5 of Summer House. She also has become very popular on TikTok and other social media sites for her comedy interview bits, like "Han on the Street."

Berner's Netflix stand-up comedy special We Ride at Dawn was released on July 9, 2024. It premiered at #2 on the Netflix charts.

She also hosts two hit podcasts - one she hosts with Paige DeSorbo (another Summer House alum) named Giggly Squad and another she hosts with her husband, named Berner Phone with Des Bishop. They have garnered over 100 million combined downloads. Berner and DeSorbo won Podcast of the Year for Giggly Squad at the 2026 iHeart Podcast Awards.

She has also been a guest on several podcasts, like Two Hot Takes (hosted by Morgan Absher), Cancelled (hosted by Tana Mongeau), Call Her Daddy (hosted by Alexandra Cooper), Good Hang (alongside DeSorbo) with Amy Poehler, and Off the Vine with Kaitlyn Bristowe. Berner served as a correspondent for the Vanity Fair Oscar Party 2025 with her Giggly Squad co-host, DeSorbo.

A 2024 New York Times feature about Berner quoted Whitney Cummings, who described Berner as "funny without the darkness and without hurting anybody". She released a comedy special, None of My Business, on Hulu in 2026.

Berner was named one of Variety's "Top 10 Comics to Watch" in 2023. She opened for Amy Poehler and Tina Fey's Restless Leg comedy tour in May 2025. Berner and DeSorbo will co-write and act in a scripted comedy series, developed by Netflix, and produced by Amy Poehler with Kay Cannon as co-writer and showrunner.

== Personal life ==
In February 2021, Berner became engaged to Des Bishop, an Irish-American comedian. They married at Bishop's home in The Hamptons in New York State on May 13, 2022.

She has a cat named Butter. Compared to the competitive environment she experienced as a nationally ranked teen tennis player, Berner described the pressures of standup as "like being at after-school arts and crafts".

== Works ==
=== Standup specials ===
- We Ride at Dawn (2024)
- None of My Business (2026)

=== Podcasts ===
- Berning in Hell (November 2018 – June 2023)
- Giggly Squad (October 2020 – Present)
- Berner Phone (July 2023 – Present)
