= Yuri Catania =

Italian photographer

Yuri Catania (born November 29, 1975, in Milano, Italy; Lives in Switzerland Rovio Val Mara Canton Ticino) is an Italian photographer, director and creative director working in the fields of fashion and luxury. He won the Cavallo di Leonardo symbol of Milan, for the direction of Best Fashion Movie of the year by Milan Film festival internazionale di Milano in April 2014. The movie was commissioned by Ermanno Scervino and starring Asia Argento. He was selected by Praz-Delavallade to exhibit some fine art photos from the series New Yorker at ART IS HOPE, at Palais de Tokyo in Paris, in November 2013. He uses his photography to create street art works with the paste-up technique. He is the author of the land art exhibition "I Gatti di Rovio", with more than 60 art installations in the heart of the town.

== Fashion Career ==
He worked as a photographer with: Chiara Ferragni, Victoria Cabello, Asia Argento, Francesco Carrozzini, Kate Nauta, Renzo Rosso, Lindsey Wixson, Nadja Bender, Rocky Mattioli, Dree Hemingway, Jessica Stam, Andreas Seppi, Fabio Fognini, Dylan Penn, Werner Schreyer, Sebastian Sauve, Coco Rocha, Alessandra Mastronardi, Andrea Denver, Elsa Hosk, Pyper America, Sara Sampaio, Renato Sobral, Lucky Blue Smith, Pyper America, Cara Delevingne, Gianluigi Buffon, Chiara Scelsi, Kanye West.

Selected Clients: LaPerla, Rick Owens, Costume National, Ermanno Scervino, Avant Toi, Philipp Plein, Tatras, Fila, Moon Boots, Lucio Vannotti, Antonioli, Ash, Genten, Kasperskian, House of Sillage, Diesel Black Gold, Hollywood Trading Company, Posh Magazine, Reve Magazine.

=== Awards ===
- 2017 – Special Mention for Asia Argento, un'attrice, un set e il cinema at Centro Candiani Venezia
- 2016 – Bloom Award by Art Fair Colonia Nominee
- 2012 – Highest Honor – Black & White Spider Award
- 2008 – Honorable Mention Award – Premio Fotografico Italiano
- 2007 – Awarded the Premio Fotografico Italiano – best still life

In 2019 he started, as an art director, the shoes brand Revolver Requeen Venexia, in partnership with the Italian shoes factory Baldan.

== Art Career ==
in 2006, Yuri Catania has started an artistic path in contraposition of his fashion career. The project, No Fashion Places, was exhibited in Milan, Venice, Paris, Tokyo and Zurich.

=== Solo Exhibitions ===
- 2017, No Fashion Places, Chateau Monfort, Milano, Italy
- 2017, No Fashion Places of America, Officine Fotografiche, Milano, Italy
- 2018, No Fashion Places of America, Venice, Italy
- 2021, Cats of Rovio, land art exhibition, Rovio, Switzerland
- 2021, American Flag IV Videogame, Artrust art gallery Switzerland
- 2021, Black Flower Secret Garden, Artrust art gallery Switzerland
- 2023, Moonlit Garden, Museo Erarta, St. Petersburg, Russia

=== Collective Exhibitions ===
- 2016, Mia Photo Fair, The Mall, Milano, Italy
- 2017, Mia Photo Fair, The Mall, Milano, Italy
- 2017, #WithRefugees, Spazio Big Santa Marta, Milano, Italy
- 2022, Volta New York, USA
- 2022, Volta Basilea, Switzerland

== Written books ==
In 2016, Yuri Catania published his first book, No Fashion Places of America, a collection of images from the American Scenario, the fruit of nine years working and traveling around the United States from the East to the West Coast.

== Recent activities ==
Yuri Catania has been reported to be traveling by an Airstream all the United States of America while working on his second book. He has stated that he is "looking for real people to interview and discovering uncommon places".

Catania owns a blog called No Fashion Places of America, where he tells some facts and stories of American people, places in the country and the associated lifestyles.
