= Emanuele Catania (footballer) =

Italian football player (born 1981)

Personal information
- Date of birth: 15 March 1981 (age 45)
- Place of birth: Catania, Italy
- Height: 1.80 m (5 ft 11 in)
- Position: Midfielder

Team information
- Current team: Siracusa

Senior career*
Years	Team	Apps	(Gls)
2000–2001	Palagonia	27	(3)
2001–2002	Acireale	26	(7)
2002	Cosenza	3	(0)
2003	Paternò	16	(1)
2004	Tivoli	16	(3)
2004–2005	Igea Virtus	33	(5)
2005–2007	Taranto	56	(1)
2007–2008	Andria BAT	29	(5)
2008–2009	Cosenza	31	(5)
2009–2010	Potenza	30	(3)
2010–2012	Nocerina	62	(16)
2012–2013	Avellino	21	(2)
2013–2014	Sorrento	30	(6)
2014–2015	Akragas	30	(13)
2015–2019	Siracusa	129	(49)
2019–2020	Catania	10	(1)
2020	Sicula Leonzio	10	(1)
2020–	Siracusa	0	(0)
- * Club domestic league appearances and goals as of 8 March 2020

Emanuele Catania (born 15 March 1981) is an Italian football player. He plays for Siracusa.

== Club career ==
He made his Serie B debut for Cosenza in the 2002–03 season.

On 9 July 2019 he joined Catania on an 1-year contract.

On 6 January 2020, he signed with Sicula Leonzio.

On 23 July 2020 he returned to Siracusa.
