= Winter House (TV series) =

American reality television series

- Genre: Reality
- Starring: Amanda Batula; Jason Cameron; Craig Conover; Kyle Cooke; Andrea Denver; Paige DeSorbo; Luke Gulbranson; Lindsay Hubbard; Gabrielle Kniery; Austen Kroll; Julia McGuire; Ciara Miller; Rachel Clark; Kory Keefer; Jessica Stocker; Brian Benni; Casey Craig; Jordan Emanuel; Katie Flood; Danielle Olivera; Alex Propson; Tom Schwartz; Malia White
- Country of origin: United States
- Original language: English
- No. of seasons: 3
- No. of episodes: 25

Production
- Executive producers: Steven Weinstock; Glenda Hersh; Matt Odgers; Scott Teti; Lauren Eskelin; Jamie Jakimo; Trish Gold; Maggie Langtry; Anne Swan; Sean Clifford
- Camera setup: Multiple
- Running time: 43–54 minutes
- Production companies: Truly Original; Left Hook Media

Original release
- Network: Bravo
- Release: October 20, 2021 – December 19, 2023

Related
- Summer House

Winter House is an American reality television series that premiered on Bravo on October 20, 2021. It is a spin-off of Summer House and follows a group of friends vacationing in Stowe, Vermont. The series features stars from several other Bravo shows including Summer House, Southern Charm, Vanderpump Rules, Summer House: Martha's Vineyard, Family Karma, and the Below Deck franchise as well as new cast members. In February 2024, it was reported that the series would be put on pause after three seasons.

== Overview ==
=== Seasons 1–2 ===
In February 2021, it was reported that a spin-off of Summer House was in the works and would begin filming later that month. The spin-off, initially titled Summer House Winter Charm, was officially announced by Bravo in May of that same year. The series, later renamed Winter House, premiered on October 20, 2021. Amanda Batula, Jason Cameron, Kyle Cooke, Craig Conover, Andrea Denver, Paige DeSorbo, Luke Gulbranson, Lindsay Hubbard, Gabrielle Kniery, Austen Kroll, Julia McGuire and Ciara Miller were the first season's main cast members.

The second season of the series began filming in February 2022 and premiered on October 13, 2022. Batula, Cameron, Cooke, Conover, DeSorbo, Gulbranson, Kroll and Miller all returned, with Rachel Clark, Kory Keefer and Jessica Stocker joining as new main cast members. Hubbard, Carl Radke, Tom Sandoval and Tom Schwartz made guest appearances. Denver, Kniery and McGuire did not return.

The first two seasons of the series were filmed in Stowe, Vermont. The house featured in the first two seasons of the show is located at 416 Nine Hearths Drive in the town of Stowe. In May 2023, Bravo announced the series was renewed for a third season.

=== Season 3 ===
Filming for the third season of the series took place in March 2023. On September 13, 2023, Bravo officially announced the third season's cast. Batula, Cooke, and Keefer returned. Tom Schwartz was upgraded to a main cast member and Cameron made guest appearances. Danielle Olivera, Malia White, Brian Benni, Casey Craig, Katie Flood, Jordan Emanuel, and Alex Propson joined as new main cast members. Conover, DeSorbo, Gulbranson, Kroll, Miller, Clark, and Stocker did not return. The third season of the series was filmed in Steamboat Springs, Colorado and premiered on October 24, 2023. The series concluded on December 19, 2023, with a Watch What Happens Live reunion. In February 2024, the series was placed on pause and would not return for a fourth season. The house featured in the third season of the show is located at 40455 Virtus Way in Steamboat Springs.

== Cast ==
=== Timeline of cast members ===
Cast member	Seasons		
Cast member	1	2	3
Amanda Batula	Main	Main	Main
Jason Cameron	Main	Main	Friend
Craig Conover	Main	Main	
Kyle Cooke	Main	Main	Main
Andrea Denver	Main		
Paige DeSorbo	Main	Main	
Luke Gulbranson	Main	Main	
Lindsay Hubbard	Main	Friend	
Gabrielle Kniery	Main		
Austen Kroll	Main	Main	
Julia McGuire	Main		
Ciara Miller	Main	Main	
Rachel Clark		Main	
Kory Keefer		Main	Main
Jessica Stocker		Main	
Brian Benni			Main
Casey Craig			Main
Jordan Emanuel			Main
Katie Flood			Main
Danielle Olivera			Main
Alex Propson			Main
Tom Schwartz		Friend	Main
Malia White			Main
Friends of the cast
Carl Radke		Friend	
Tom Sandoval		Friend	
Samantha Feher			Friend
Rhylee Gerber			Friend
Aesha Scott			Friend
Sandy Yawn			Friend

== Episodes ==
=== Series overview ===
Season	Episodes	Originally released	
Season	Episodes	First released	Last released
1	6	October 20, 2021	November 24, 2021
2	9	October 13, 2022	December 15, 2022
3	10	October 24, 2023	December 19, 2023

=== Season 1 (2021) ===
No. overall	No. in season	Title	Original release date	U.S. viewers (millions)
1	1	"Winter Should Be Fun!"	October 20, 2021	0.56
2	2	"Cold Weather, Hot Secrets"	October 27, 2021	0.66
3	3	"A Slippery Slope"	November 3, 2021	0.61
4	4	"Sleigh All Day"	November 10, 2021	0.44
5	5	"Let the Games Begin"	November 17, 2021	0.52
6	6	"There's Snow Place Like Home"	November 24, 2021	0.42

=== Season 2 (2022) ===
No. overall	No. in season	Title	Original release date	U.S. viewers (millions)
7	1	"And Stowe It Begins"	October 13, 2022	0.51
8	2	"Cold Snap"	October 20, 2022	0.41
9	3	"Saints & Sinners"	October 27, 2022	0.37
10	4	"Highs and Froze"	November 3, 2022	0.38
11	5	"Cold Shoulder"	November 10, 2022	0.34
12	6	"Friendships on Ice"	November 17, 2022	0.36
13	7	"If Looks Could Chill"	December 1, 2022	0.42
14	8	"Stowe Messy"	December 8, 2022	0.37
15	9	"Until We Gnar Again"	December 15, 2022	0.40

=== Season 3 (2023) ===
No. overall	No. in season	Title	Original release date	U.S. viewers (millions)
16	1	"Loverboys, City Girls, and Yachties - Oh My!"	October 24, 2023	0.39
17	2	"Pirate Ships and Situationships"	October 31, 2023	0.31
18	3	"Exes and Oohs"	November 7, 2023	0.31
19	4	"Same Name, No Game"	November 14, 2023	0.36
20	5	"How the West Was Fun"	November 21, 2023	0.39
21	6	"Say My Name, Say My Name"	November 28, 2023	0.40
22	7	"Parental Advisory"	December 5, 2023	0.37
23	8	"Coming in Hot"	December 12, 2023	0.43
24	9	"One Last Ride"	December 19, 2023	0.44
25	10	"Reunion"	December 19, 2023	0.35
