= Ciara Miller =

American television personality (born 1995)

- Born: December 23, 1995 (age 30); Atlanta, Georgia, U.S.
- Education: Chamberlain University
- Occupations: Television personality; model; influencer
- Years active: 2021–present
- Known for: Summer House; Winter House; The Traitors; Dancing with the Stars

Ciara Miller (born December 23, 1995) is an American television personality and influencer. She is best known as a cast member of the Bravo reality television series Summer House, in which she has starred since her debut in 2021. Miller has also appeared on the reality competition show The Traitors, and co-hosted season eight of Love Island: Aftersun.

== Early life ==
Miller was born and raised in Atlanta, Georgia then later moved to New York City, New York. Miller graduated from Chamberlain University cum laude in 2018 with a degree in nursing.

== Career ==
Early in her career as a nurse, Miller worked in an ICU in Brooklyn, New York, which she held through the COVID-19 pandemic. Shortly after, she returned to Atlanta and began working as a travel nurse before being cast on Summer House in 2021.

=== Modeling ===
In March of 2023, Miller debuted as a Victoria's Secret model becoming Bravo's first star to do so. In 2025, she modeled for Express' summer 2025 campaign.

=== Reality television ===
In 2021, Miller was cast for season five of Summer House. She has since been a cast member and is set to return for season eleven. Later that year, Miller was also announced to be joining the cast for Winter House. Miller did not return for season three.

In 2025, Miller was announced as a cast member for season 3 of the Peacock show The Traitors. As a Faithful, she was incorrectly suspected as a Traitor and was banished during the Round Table of episode 8, placing 10th out of 23 competitors.

In 2026, during an upfront for Hulu’s unscripted programming, Miller and Maura Higgins were announced as the first celebrity participants for the thirty-fifth season of Dancing with the Stars. Miller was partnered with professional dancer Brandon Armstrong. She was eliminated in Week 4 during Mariah Carey Night on October 6, 2026, after performing a jazz routine to “Emotions,” earning a score of 21 out of 30. A few weeks later, it was announced that Miller and Tefi Pessoa would be co-hosting Love Island: Aftersun for season eight.

In October 2026, Miller was nominated for the 2026 EBONY Power 100 People’s Choice Award, honoring Black talent making an impact on culture today.

== Filmography ==
=== Television ===
| Year | Title | Notes | Ref. |
|---|---|---|---|
| 2021–present | Summer House | Main cast; Season 5–present | |
| 2021–present | Watch What Happens Live with Andy Cohen | Guest; 18 episodes | |
| 2021–2022 | Winter House | Main cast; Season 1–2 | |
| 2025 | The Traitors | Season 3; 9 episodes | |
| 2026 | Love Island USA | Season 8; Aftersun Co-host | |
| 2026 | Dancing with the Stars | Season 35 | |

=== Music videos ===
| Year | Title | Artist | Role | Ref. |
|---|---|---|---|---|
| 2026 | "Cowgirl" | Shaboozey | Cherie Lee | |
