= Brent Chua =

Brent Cu Chua
- Born: May 21, 1985 (age 41); Manila, Philippines
- Modeling information
- Height: 6 ft 1 in (1.85 m)
- Hair color: Black
- Eye color: Brown

Brent Chua (born May 21, 1985) is a Chinese Filipino model and fashion photographer. The Philippine Daily Inquirer has referred to him as an Asian male supermodel.

He is the youngest among 5 brothers.

== Modelling career ==
After walking the runways of the Asian region and Europe, including Milan, Paris, Hong Kong, Thailand, Malaysia, Taiwan, China, the Philippines, Indonesia and Singapore, where he won the "Male Model of the Year" category at the Singapore Fashion Awards 2004, he headed to New York City. Currently represented by Ford Models, he has appeared in campaigns such as Benetton, Bang and Olufsen, TIGI Bedhead, Motorola, and Macy's, and has walked the catwalks of Versace, Issey Miyake, Yohji Yamamoto, Gucci, and Boss.

He has been photographed by Vogue icon Steven Meisel.
