= Summer House (2017 TV series) =

American reality television series on Bravo

- Genre: Reality
- Starring: Summer House cast
- Country of origin: United States
- Original language: English
- No. of seasons: 10
- No. of episodes: 155 (list of episodes)

Production
- Executive producers: Sean Clifford; Lauren Eskelin; Trish Gold; Glenda Hersh; Jamie Jakimo; Maggie Langtry; Faith Gaskins; Matt Odgers; Scott Teti; Steven Weinstock; Giovanni Wilson
- Camera setup: Multi-camera
- Running time: 44 minutes
- Production companies: Truly Original; Left Hook Media

Original release
- Network: Bravo
- Release: January 9, 2017 – present

Related
- Winter House; Summer House: Martha's Vineyard; In the City

Summer House is an American reality television series that premiered on January 9, 2017, on Bravo. The series follows a group of friends who share a summer house in the Hamptons town of Southampton, New York. The friends work in the city during the week and travel to the Hamptons on the weekends.

The first season consisted of original cast members: Kyle Cooke, Cristina Gibson, Lindsay Hubbard, Stephen McGee, Carl Radke, Jaclyn Shuman, Everett Weston, Ashley Wirkus, and Lauren Wirkus, serving in a recurring capacity. The cast for the tenth season includes Batula, Cooke, Hubbard, Radke, Ciara Miller, West Wilson, Jesse Solomon, Mia Calabrese, KJ Dillard, Dara Levitan, Levi Sebree, Bailey Taylor, and Ben Waddell.

The success of the show has resulted in three spin-offs: Winter House, Summer House: Martha's Vineyard, and In the City. In July 2026, streaming service Hayu announced a Canadian installment of Summer House, the series' first international adaptation, set to premiere in 2027.

== Overview ==
=== 2017–2020 ===
The first season premiered on January 9, 2017. Kyle Cooke, Cristina Gibson, Lindsay Hubbard, Stephen McGee, Carl Radke, Jaclyn Shuman, Everett Weston, Ashley Wirkus, and Lauren Wirkus were introduced as cast members.

The tenth episode of the fifth season of Vanderpump Rules titled "Summer House Rules" served as a cross-over preview to Summer House. The transition of the two-hour episode featured Kristen Doute, Katie Maloney, Stassi Schroeder and Scheana heading to New York and visiting the summer house alongside the cast. After the Vanderpump Rules cast departed New York, the second half focused primarily on the Summer House cast. The second half of the episode attracted a total of 842,000 viewers.

The house in the first season is located at 90 Napeague Harbor Road, in Amagansett on the western edge of Montauk. Filming took place in private spaces in the area. Summer House was filmed at Kirk Park Beach throughout July 2016. The production company, True Entertainment, recorded scenes at the IGA in Amagansett late June 2016.

It was announced in April 2017 that the series had been renewed for a second season. However, the Town of East Hampton denied permission to shoot at the same house on the Montauk/Napeague line. The Town noted that the house could not be used for commercial purposes, violated town codes prohibiting four unrelated people from living in a house, and was not on the town rental registry as required in 2017.

The second season premiered on January 22, 2018. Kyle Cooke, Lindsay Hubbard, Stephen McGee, Carl Radke, and Lauren Wirkus returned from the first season, with Amanda Batula, Amit Neuman, and Danielle Olivera joining the main cast. Ashley Wirkus returned in a recurring role.

The house in the second season is located at 1451 Deerfield Road, Watermill, New York (in Southampton, New York rather than East Hampton in the first season).

The third season premiered on March 4, 2019. Amanda Batula, Kyle Cooke, Lindsay Hubbard, Danielle Olivera, and Carl Radke returned for the third season, with Hannah Berner, Paige DeSorbo, and Jordan Verroi joining the main cast. Erika Kirk appeared as a religious love interest of Jordan Verroi. Carl Radke, a friend of both Jordan and Erika, set up the date, explaining to the camera that Erika is "beautiful" and "happens to be religious".

The fourth season premiered on February 5, 2020. Amanda Batula, Hannah Berner, Kyle Cooke, Paige DeSorbo, Lindsay Hubbard, and Carl Radke returned, with Jules Daoud and Luke Gulbranson joining the main cast. Jordan Verroi made guest appearances.

=== 2021–2024 ===
Unlike previous seasons where filming took place over weekends throughout the summer, the format was changed for season five due to the ongoing COVID-19 pandemic. Rather than traveling back and forth between New York City and the Hamptons each weekend, the cast lived together and worked from home in the Hamptons for a full six weeks while filming occurred.

The fifth season premiered on February 4, 2021. Amanda Batula, Hannah Berner, Kyle Cooke, Paige DeSorbo, Luke Gulbranson, Lindsay Hubbard, Danielle Olivera, and Carl Radke returned, with Ciara Miller joining the cast. Jules Daoud and Jordan Verroi did not return.

The house in the fifth season is located at 10 Watermill Height Drive, Water Mill, New York. A preview of Winter House season one appeared after the season finale on April 22, 2021.

The sixth season premiered on January 17, 2022. Amanda Batula, Kyle Cooke, Paige DeSorbo, Luke Gulbranson, Lindsay Hubbard, Ciara Miller, Danielle Olivera, and Carl Radke returned, with Andrea Denver of Winter House, Mya Allen, and Alex Wach. Hannah Berner did not return. Southern Charm's Craig Conover and Austen Kroll made guest appearances. The reunion was taped on April 8, 2022.

The seventh season premiered on February 13, 2023. Kyle Cooke, Lindsay Hubbard, Carl Radke, Amanda Batula, Danielle Olivera, Paige DeSorbo, Ciara Miller, and Mya Allen all returned, joined by Samantha Feher, Chris Leoni, and Gabby Prescod. Andrea Denver returned in a friend capacity, joined by Winter House cast member Kory Keefer. Luke Gulbranson and Alex Wach did not return to the series, although Gulbranson made a guest appearance. Southern Charm's Craig Conover made guest appearances. The reunion was taped on April 27, 2023.

The eighth season premiered on February 22, 2024. Kyle Cooke, Lindsay Hubbard, Carl Radke, Amanda Batula, Danielle Olivera, Paige DeSorbo, Ciara Miller and Gabby Prescod all returned alongside new cast members Jesse Solomon and West Wilson. Allen, Feher, Leoni, and Keefer did not return, although Feher and Leoni both made guest appearances. Southern Charm's Craig Conover also made guest appearances. The reunion was taped on May 3, 2024.

=== 2025–present ===
The ninth season premiered on February 12, 2025. Kyle Cooke, Lindsay Hubbard, Carl Radke, Amanda Batula, Paige DeSorbo, Ciara Miller, Gabby Prescod, Jesse Solomon and West Wilson returned alongside new cast members Imrul Hassan and Lexi Wood. Olivera and Southern Charm's Craig Conover made guest appearances. The reunion was taped on April 24, 2025.

On June 5, 2025, it was announced that Paige DeSorbo would be exiting the series after seven seasons. On June 6, 2025, it was announced that Lexi Wood would be exiting the series after one season. On June 18, 2025, it was announced that Imrul Hassan would be exiting the series after one season.

On June 16, 2025, Cooke and Batula confirmed they were returning for another season and that production was set to begin in July. Lindsay Hubbard, Carl Radke, Ciara Miller, West Wilson and Jesse Solomon also returned for the season. In December 2025, it was announced that the tenth season would premiere on February 3, 2026. Mia Calabrese, KJ Dillard, Dara Levitan, Levi Sebree, Bailey Taylor, and The Bachelor Australia alum Ben Waddell joined the cast. Olivera, Gulbranson, Denver and Hassan made guest appearances. The reunion was taped on April 23, 2026.

In September 2025, Bravo announced a spin-off tentatively titled In The City. The series logline reads, "In the city that never sleeps, a group of New Yorkers navigates the biggest transitions of their lives—marriage, parenthood, reinvention and the reality of growing up without growing apart. Can they have it all, or will they need to choose between the lives they've built and the futures they never saw coming?" On November 13, 2025, it was announced that Cooke, Batula, and Hubbard were set to star in the new series.

In January 2026, Amanda Batula and Kyle Cooke announced their separation in a joint statement after four years of marriage. Batula and West Wilson confirmed they were in a romantic relationship in a joint statement released on March 31, 2026. Their statement generated media attention and backlash from viewers due to Wilson's previous relationship with fellow cast member Ciara Miller. Batula later issued a public apology, stating she was "truly sorry to everyone I've disappointed and hurt."

In May 2026, the series was renewed for an eleventh season. The following month, it was announced that Wilson, Batula, and Waddell would be departing from the cast. In July, Miller shared that she was returning to the Hamptons to begin filming for the eleventh season. That same month, the network announced that production had started on the new season, with Calabrese, Cooke, Dillard, Hubbard, Radke, Solomon, and Taylor joining Miller as returning cast members.

== Cast ==
=== Timeline of cast members ===
Cast member	Seasons									
Cast member	1	2	3	4	5	6	7	8	9	10
Kyle Cooke	Main	Main	Main	Main	Main	Main	Main	Main	Main	Main
Cristina Gibson	Main									
Lindsay Hubbard	Main	Main	Main	Main	Main	Main	Main	Main	Main	Main
Stephen McGee	Main	Main								
Carl Radke	Main	Main	Main	Main	Main	Main	Main	Main	Main	Main
Jaclyn Shuman	Main									
Everett Weston	Main	Guest	Guest	Guest		Guest				
Ashley Wirkus	Main	Friend								
Lauren Wirkus	Main	Main								
Amanda Batula	Friend	Main	Main	Main	Main	Main	Main	Main	Main	Main
Amit Neuman		Main								
Danielle Olivera		Main	Main	Friend	Main	Main	Main	Main	Guest	Guest
Hannah Berner			Main	Main	Main					
Paige DeSorbo			Main	Main	Main	Main	Main	Main	Main	
Jordan Verroi			Main	Friend						
Jules Daoud				Main						
Luke Gulbranson				Main	Main	Main	Guest			Guest
Ciara Miller					Main	Main	Main	Main	Main	Main
Mya Allen						Main	Main			
Andrea Denver						Main	Friend	Guest		Guest
Alex Wach						Main				
Samantha Feher							Main	Guest		
Chris Leoni							Main	Guest		
Gabby Prescod							Main	Main	Main	
Jesse Solomon								Main	Main	Main
West Wilson								Main	Main	Main
Imrul Hassan									Main	Guest
Lexi Wood									Main	
Mia Calabrese										Main
KJ Dillard										Main
Dara Levitan										Main
Levi Sebree										Main
Bailey Taylor										Main
Ben Waddell										Main
Recurring cast members
Kory Keefer							Friend			
Bailee Henderson									Friend	

== Episodes ==
Season	Episodes	Originally released	
Season	Episodes	First released	Last released
1	10	January 9, 2017	March 13, 2017
2	12	January 22, 2018	April 3, 2018
3	14	March 4, 2019	June 3, 2019
4	16	February 5, 2020	May 13, 2020
5	14	February 4, 2021	May 6, 2021
6	17	January 17, 2022	May 16, 2022
7	17	February 13, 2023	June 5, 2023
8	17	February 22, 2024	June 13, 2024
9	18	February 12, 2025	June 11, 2025
10	20	February 3, 2026	June 16, 2026
