= Summer House: Martha's Vineyard =

American reality television series

- Genre: Reality
- Starring: Nick Arrington; Jasmine Ellis Cooper; Silas Cooper; Jordan Emanuel; Bria Fleming; Shanice Henderson; Amir Lancaster; Jason Lyke; Preston Mitchum; Summer Marie Thomas; Alex Tyree; Noelle Hughley
- Country of origin: United States
- Original language: English
- No. of seasons: 2
- No. of episodes: 18

Production
- Executive producers: Steven Weinstock; Glenda Hersh; Lauren Eskelin; Lorraine Haughton-Lawson; Ronica Wynder; Shanae Humphrey; Anne Swan
- Camera setup: Multiple
- Running time: 43–54 minutes
- Production company: Truly Original

Original release
- Network: Bravo
- Release: May 7, 2023 – May 26, 2024

Related
- Summer House

Summer House: Martha's Vineyard is an American reality television series that premiered on Bravo on May 7, 2023. It is a spin-off of Summer House and follows a group of young Black professionals and entrepreneurs vacationing on Martha's Vineyard. On July 11, 2023, the series was renewed for a second season. The second season premiered on March 24, 2024. On May 28, 2024, it was reported that the series would be put on pause after two seasons.

== Overview ==
Bravo described the series by saying it "follows a group of 12 friends as they enjoy their island getaway, indulging in cultural experiences and exclusive island activities while learning to overcome their personal obstacles". The setting of Martha's Vineyard is historically significant because the island has been known as a popular vacation destination for Black Americans for over one hundred years. As early as the eighteenth century, freed slaves began purchasing land there. In the nineteenth and twentieth centuries, middle-class and affluent Black families began purchasing summer homes in the area. The town of Oak Bluffs in particular became a noteworthy vacation spot due to the fact that it was the only town on the island that was accommodating to Black travelers in the early 1900s. The island remains a popular tourist destination to this day.

=== Season 1 ===
The series premiered on May 7, 2023. Nick Arrington, Jasmine Ellis Cooper, Silas Cooper, Jordan Emanuel, Bria Fleming, Shanice Henderson, Amir Lancaster, Jason Lyke, Preston Mitchum, Summer Marie Thomas and Alex Tyree were the first season's main cast members. Mariah Torres entered the house at the beginning of the season but was asked to leave in the third episode after she pushed Fleming during an argument. Torres did not appear in any of the season's remaining five episodes. As a result, she was not recognized as a main cast member. On July 11, 2023, the series was renewed for a second season.

=== Season 2 ===
In February 2024, it was announced that the second season of the series would premiere on March 24, 2024. Arrington, Ellis Cooper, Emanuel, Fleming, Henderson, Lancaster, Mitchum, Thomas and Tyree all returned alongside new cast member Noelle Hughley. Silas Cooper and Lyke did not return. Cooper, who is an officer in the U.S. Army, was deployed shortly before filming of the second season began, which prevented him from returning to the series.

== Cast ==
=== Main ===
- Nick Arrington
- Silas Cooper (season 1; guest, season 2)
- Jasmine Ellis Cooper
- Jordan Emanuel
- Bria Fleming
- Shanice Henderson
- Amir Lancaster
- Jason Lyke (season 1)
- Preston Mitchum
- Summer Marie Thomas
- Alex Tyree
- Noelle Hughley (season 2)

=== Recurring ===
- Mariah Torres (season 1; guest, season 2)

== Production ==
=== Development ===
In 2021, Bravo approached Truly Original, the production company behind the series, about developing a reality show set on the island of Martha's Vineyard. Executive producer Lorraine Haughton-Lawson talked about the appeal of the location by saying: "When you go, you see all the history, and you meet all these amazing Black people whose families either lived on the island or summered on the island year after year, and you see the Black-owned businesses and how it really is this kind of idyllic enclave that a lot of people didn't know about." She also expressed her dedication to representing Black excellence in the shows she produces. An employee at Bravo eventually saw a photo of Silas Cooper and his friends vacationing on Martha's Vineyard on Instagram and contacted him to be part of the series.

Cooper and his wife Jasmine Ellis Cooper both have connections to the area. Cooper says he had been vacationing on Martha's Vineyard every summer for seven years prior to filming the first season of the show. It's also the first place the couple vacationed together after beginning their relationship. Ellis Cooper acknowledged the area's importance to her by saying, "in terms of Black history, it's so rich in multigenerational legacy." Cooper agreed about the area's rich history and culture but also said it's a great place to party and relax. He talked about his desires to buy a home on Martha's Vineyard and take his and Ellis Cooper's future children and grandchildren there as well.

=== Casting ===
After Cooper was scouted on Instagram, he and Ellis Cooper began suggesting friends of theirs to the show's production team. The cast members are all authentically connected. Jordan Emanuel, Bria Fleming, Shanice Henderson and Ellis Cooper are all former co-workers. Mariah Torres is one of Ellis Cooper's best friends from college. Ellis Cooper met Summer Marie Thomas at the Sundance Film Festival, as both women are screenwriters. Jason Lyke is Ellis Cooper's former roommate. She also knew Alex Tyree because the two met working as creatives in New York City. Preston Mitchum and Cooper are Alpha Phi Alpha fraternity brothers while Tyree and Nick Arrington are Kappa Alpha Psi fraternity brothers. Amir Lancaster is friends with Arrington.

Mitchum discussed joining the show to positively represent the LGBTQ community: "For me, one of the things I wanted to think about specifically as a Black gay man is what representation did I or did I not see happening generally on the shows I watch. I knew that hopefully I could be a role model for so many Black gay kids growing up." Lancaster, who is half Black and half Lebanese, wanted to explore Black culture and history that he was not exposed to growing up. Emanuel was excited for the audience to get to know her on a deeper level and felt the Black representation within the cast was unique, stating that while the show is dramatic and fun she appreciated that the cast is also intellectual and capable of having serious conversations.

=== Filming ===
Filming of the first season took place over the course of 15 days in late summer 2022. The house featured in the first season of the show is located at 96 Beach Road in the town of Edgartown. Ellis Cooper said the cast was unaware the show was going to be a Summer House spin-off while filming. Fleming stated that while filming was emotionally difficult for her at times, she was glad to be part of the show. She noted everything that transpired was real and authentic and that she enjoyed being able to express herself freely on camera.

The second season of the series began filming in late August 2023.

== Episodes ==
=== Series overview ===
Season	Episodes	Originally released	
Season	Episodes	First released	Last released
1	8	May 7, 2023	June 25, 2023
2	10	March 24, 2024	May 26, 2024

=== Season 1 (2023) ===
No. overall	No. in season	Title	Original release date	U.S. viewers (millions)
1	1	"Not Your Mama's Vineyard"	May 7, 2023	0.40
Jasmine, Silas, Preston, Bria, Jordan, Nick, Alex, Amir, and Mariah move into the house. Jasmine and Silas discuss their recent wedding. Amir and Nick set their sights on Jordan. Amir talks about growing up biracial and wanting to learn more about the Black history he wasn't exposed to growing up. Jasmine and Mariah open up about their friendship and being homeless together for six months. Jasmine argues with Bria about bringing her dog, Milo, to the house without permission after finding Milo's hair on the couch. Bria defends her actions by saying Milo is her emotional support animal. Jordan reveals to Amir and Alex that she has been celibate for the past year. Bria calls out Jasmine about disrespecting her relationship with her boyfriend Simon after Jasmine tries setting her up with the men in the house. The group discusses the Black history of Martha's Vineyard. That night at dinner, Silas offends Jordan by accusing her of keeping Jasmine out too late partying and insinuating she's a bad influence.
2	2	"Guess Who's Coming to the Vineyard"	May 14, 2023	0.34
Jordan defends herself against Silas' accusations. The next day, the group goes bowling together. Bria asks Jasmine and Silas if Simon can come to stay with her for a week. Mariah hosts a Moon Mass event for the house but is hurt when everyone acts uninterested. Shanice moves in and shows romantic interest in Alex. Mariah confronts Bria for mixing her dog's laundry with the house laundry. The two begin to argue and Mariah pushes Bria. The group goes out to a club, during which time Bria's friend Phil arrives to the house and uses Nick's bathroom without flushing. Bria gets upset when Mariah comes to the club and doesn't apologize to her and Jordan tells Jasmine she has to address Mariah's behavior. When the group arrives home, Nick asks Phil to flush the toilet and Phil refuses.
3	3	"House Divided"	May 21, 2023	0.36
After Phil refuses to flush Nick's toilet, things escalate as the group gets angry about his disrespectful behavior. The housemates, sans Nick and Mariah, get together and decide that Phil has to leave. Bria adds that Mariah should go too as punishment for Mariah pushing her. Everyone agrees that they cannot get physical with each other and that Mariah has to leave as well. Bria tells Phil about the decision and Jasmine tells Mariah, who is hurt because she feels like Jasmine has been talking about her behind her back. She ultimately agrees to go home so she can spend time with her son. Both Phil and Mariah exit the house. The next morning, Alex distances himself from Shanice after he reads an article online about her allegedly stalking an ex-boyfriend. The group goes to Inkwell Beach for a field day and Jasmine educates the group about the beach's history. Amir continues to flirt with Jordan and Shanice tries to make peace with Alex. Later that night, Silas gets jealous after hearing stories from Jasmine's past. Nick reveals he has a girlfriend which shocks Bria, Jordan and Shanice who all say they've received flirty messages from him on Instagram.
4	4	"New Roomies, New Beef"	May 28, 2023	0.30
The women of the house take a morning walk and discuss the news that Nick has a girlfriend. Meanwhile, the guys work out together and Nick defends the flirty messages he sent to Bria, Jordan and Shanice. Amir opens up about his insecurities regarding not feeling Black enough and cries when he tells Preston and Bria how thankful he is that the house accepts him. Jasmine confronts Nick about calling Shanice his future wife in her presence despite having a girlfriend, which Nick denies. Jasmine then expresses her concerns about Bria's boyfriend Simon staying in the house for a week. The group goes fishing together. Jason and Summer move into the house. Later that night, Bria accuses Silas of not wanting Simon to stay in the house because he's white which upsets Silas and leads to a heated argument between the two. Silas calls Bria manipulative and Bria says Silas is controlling of Jasmine.
5	5	"Jamaican Me Crazy"	June 4, 2023	0.37
Bria threatens to leave the house after her argument with Silas but calms down and decides to stay after she talks to Simon on the phone. Jordan celebrates one year of celibacy and explains the reasoning behind her choice to be celibate. Jason talks about the recent birth of his daughter and Amir expresses to the guys that he doesn't feel Jordan is romantically interested in him. Jordan pushes back on Jasmine's continued attempts to force a relationship between her and Amir, stating she's happy and content being single. Summer throws a Reggae Night event for the house where she kisses Alex during a game of truth or dare. Simon arrives at the house and gifts everyone watches when the group goes out to dinner. Silas and Bria make amends after their argument and Silas agrees to let Simon stay in the house for as long as he wants.
6	6	"Naked Ambition"	June 11, 2023	0.49
Jasmine gets upset about feeling isolated from her girlfriends since getting married. Shanice opens about the online harassment she received after her breakup with her ex-boyfriend, who is an actor. The men go out for guy's night while the women have girls' night. Silas complains about Jasmine's vacation behavior and then tells Jason that he's too nice to women, which offends Jason. The girls have a great time together and enjoy seeing Jasmine let loose without Silas. Back at the house, Bria becomes furious with Shanice when she gets completely naked in the jacuzzi with Simon present. Jason accuses Silas of talking down to him and Silas and Jasmine bicker after he says she didn't defend him during his argument with Jason. Shanice, Jordan, Amir, and Alex go out to play tennis and Jordan begins feeling objectified by Alex.
7	7	"It Ain't All Rosé"	June 18, 2023	0.36
Shanice apologizes to Bria for getting naked in the jacuzzi around Simon. At the group's rosé brunch, the women confront Alex for googling Shanice and bringing up the allegations about her online. Jordan calls out Alex and Amir for sexualizing her and breaks down in tears when expressing that she feels disrespected and objectified. Alex and Amir apologize for their comments. Preston calls his boyfriend Donald to check in while Alex calls his brother Al and they discuss their love of music. Preston hosts a Pride party, where he informs the group about the origins of Pride and the Stonewall riots. The men of the house form a group called Big Time Crush and put on a fun dance performance. Silas and Jasmine continue to bicker after he chastises her for ruining a pair of his pants and then refuses to eat the breakfast she makes for him, which causes Jasmine to question whether or not their marriage will last.
8	8	"To Martha!"	June 25, 2023	0.36
The housemates visit the African American Heritage Trail. Afterwards, everyone prepares for the summer's final party and Jasmine vents to Jordan about the tension between her and Silas. Nick's girlfriend Tasia surprises him by showing up at the party unexpectedly. Alex performs a song he wrote with his brother Al. Bria questions Tasia about her relationship with Nick and the flirty messages he sent to the women in the house. Summer and Alex plan to see each other in New York City while Amir and Jordan agree to just be friends. Bria and Simon get into an argument about her disrespecting him. Summer tries to mediate but Bria gets jealous when she sees her speaking to Simon alone. The two have an explosive altercation where Summer pushes Bria, and Bria cries after being pushed by someone for the second time. Silas and Jasmine's relationship reaches a breaking point after another fight. The next morning, Bria makes amends with Simon and Summer after Summer apologizes for pushing her. The group reflects back on their time on Martha's Vineyard as they move out of the house.

=== Season 2 (2024) ===
No. overall	No. in season	Title	Original release date	U.S. viewers (millions)
9	1	"Old Vineyard, New Drama"	March 24, 2024	0.31
10	2	"Jealousy, Jobs & Judgment"	March 31, 2024	0.32
11	3	"Dishonorable Guests"	April 7, 2024	0.34
12	4	"Summer Under Pressure"	April 14, 2024	0.28
13	5	"The Worst Kept Secret"	April 21, 2024	0.22
14	6	"A Perfect Summer Storm"	April 28, 2024	0.26
15	7	"Flamingo on the Bluffs"	May 5, 2024	0.29
16	8	"Gossip Girls"	May 12, 2024	0.29
17	9	"The Fall of Summer"	May 19, 2024	0.27
18	10	"Reunion"	May 26, 2024	0.24

== Critical reception ==
The show has received positive reviews from critics. Vulture's Ile-Ife Okantah called the show intriguing and commented that it proudly represented the "many nuances of being young and Black". Additionally, she remarked that the series was wonderfully cast. Refinery29's Ineye Komonibo said each cast member brought something new and interesting and commended the show for showcasing the history of Oak Bluffs. Furthermore, she described the series as fresh and captivating. Taryn Finley of HuffPost praised the series for being less overproduced and more raw than most modern reality television shows, stating that added to its entertainment value and addictiveness. She also positively compared the show to The Real World and College Hill. Krystie Yandoli of Rolling Stone declared that the series "gives Bravo some much-needed diversity". Kyndall Cunningham of The Daily Beast wrote that the show had "a lot going for it" and praised the cast by calling them vibrant. She said the series is "a refreshing pivot from Bravo's recent attempts to integrate its white shows with people of color", referencing the racial controversies that have resulted from integrating some other shows on the network.
