= Nicola Tappenden =

English model

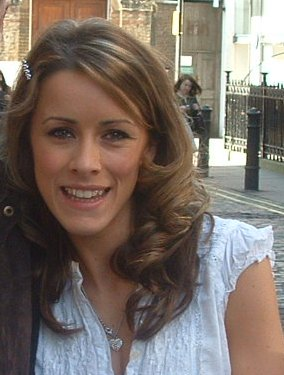
- Tappenden outside WAGs Boutique, 2007
- Born: 2 December 1982 (age 43); Croydon, Surrey, England
- Occupation: Model
- Children: 2
- Modelling information
- Hair colour: Brown

Nicola Tappenden (born 2 December 1982) is an English model and former Page 3 girl (credited under her modelling name Nicola T). She featured in the 2010 edition of Celebrity Big Brother, where she was the sixth contestant evicted.

== Early life and career ==
Tappenden was born in Croydon, Surrey. She went to Shirley High School in Croydon. She began her topless modelling career as a Page Three girl at the age of 20 in 2002, after winning The Sun's first ever Page 3 Idol competition whilst working for Citigroup asset management. She has become a regular fixture since, as well as undertaking other glamour and retail fashion modelling assignments.

In May 2007, Tappenden entered the Miss Great Britain contest as Miss Croydon. She was placed tenth.

As an actress, Tappenden appeared in the film Deuce Bigalow: European Gigolo in 2005.

Tappenden was invited to take part in the reality television show WAGs Boutique (due to her relationship with Fulham F.C. striker Bobby Zamora), in which two teams of WAGs competed to run two fashion boutiques over a three-month period. Later, in 2007, she released an exercise video, WAGS Workout.

In January 2010, Tappenden was a housemate in the seventh Celebrity Big Brother. She was evicted from the reality show on 27 January in a surprise eviction, finishing in sixth place.

She also appeared in 50 Greatest Plastic Surgery Shockers in December 2010.

Tappenden has recorded a single, called "Drunk", with rapper Coolio, which was released on 1 March 2010.

She also took part in the Race for Life single "Girls Just Wanna Have Fun", which was released in April 2010. The track features several other celebrities, including Kym Marsh, Danielle Lloyd, Lisa Scott Lee and Kelli Young.

She also took part in a WAGs edition of Come Dine with Me.

== Personal life ==
Having dated Leeds United midfielder Simon Walton for two years, Tappenden gave birth to their first child in November 2008, a daughter named Poppy.

== Discography ==
=== Singles ===
Chart	Year	Title	Peak position	Album
UK Singles Chart	2010	"Drunk" (feat. Coolio)		
UK Singles Chart	2010	"Girls Just Wanna Have Fun"		

== See also ==
- Lad culture
- Lad mags
