= Nicole Williams English =

Canadian model (born 1983)

- Born: Nicole Lynn Williams; October 30, 1983 (age 43); Paradise, Newfoundland and Labrador, Canada
- Spouse: Larry English (m. 2017)
- Children: 1
- Modeling information
- Height: 5 ft 9 in (1.75 m)
- Hair color: Brown
- Eye color: Brown
- Agencies: Ford Models

Instagram information
- Page: Nicole Williams English
- Years active: 2012–present
- Genres: Modeling; fashion; vlogging
- Followers: 2.2 million

TikTok information
- Page: Nicole Williams English
- Years active: 2020–present
- Genres: Modeling; fashion; vlogging
- Followers: 300 thousand

YouTube information
- Channel: Nicole Williams English
- Years active: 2024–present
- Genres: Modeling; fashion; vlogging
- Subscribers: 89
- Views: 22,180
- Last updated: October 28, 2026

Nicole Lynn Williams English (Note: Sometimes stylized as Williams-English) (born Nicole Lynn Williams, October 30, 1983) is a Canadian model and fashion designer based in the United States. Born in Newfoundland, Williams English developed an interest in modeling at a young age, prompting her mother to move her family to Toronto when she was 16. Eventually moving to America, she garnered early prominence as a cast member of the reality television show WAGS LA from 2015 to 2017, through her relationship with American football player Larry English, whom she married in 2017. Williams English has been featured annually in the Sports Illustrated Swimsuit Issue since 2023, being featured on its cover in 2026. Additionally she is also known for her animal welfare activism and her clothing line, Nia Lynn.

== Biography ==
Nicole Lynn Williams was born on October 30, 1983, in the Canadian town of Paradise, Newfoundland. She has partial Amerindian ancestry. Williams parents frequently saved stray animals and kept pets as she grew up, which she has attributed to her concerns regarding animal welfare.

Williams developed an interest in fashion through her mother, who taught her how to sew clothes for her Barbie dolls at age six. Pursuing a career in the industry, she moved to Toronto alongside her brothers, where she signed to an agency at age 16. She would often bus herself in sleeping bags from Toronto to New York City to attend castings. She did modeling work in Taipei, Barcelona, and Cape Town, before eventually settling in New York City. Taking modeling more seriously, she remained in New York before moving to Los Angeles.

In 2011, she began dating American football player Larry English. Through this, she was featured as part of the cast of WAGS LA, a reality television by E! that follows the lives of several romantic partners of athletes. After dating for four years, the couple became engaged in September 2016. The couple married on May 19, 2017, with Williams changing her surname to Williams English (alternatively stylized as Williams-English). Williams English's appearance on WAGS LA, which lasted until the show's end in 2017, boosted her fame and enabled her to build a sizable following online. As her brand began to be built, she was recognized more by the modeling world.

In the same year, Williams English launched her own clothing brand, Nia Lynn, named after her mother and niece. The brand is a luxury swimwear line with a focus on fit and fabrication, and is inspired by the different women in her life. Regarding swimwear, Williams English has stated that she always wanted to be featured on the Sports Illustrated Swimsuit Issue since seeing Tyra Banks on the cover of the issue in 1997. She appeared in a Sports Illustrated casting call for the Swimsuit Issue in 2017. Williams English became pregnant with a daughter in 2022; she was subsequentially informed that she had been selected to be featured in 2023's Swimsuit Issue. She publicly revealed her pregnancy at Miami Swim Week in July by showing her baby bump while on the runway. She debuted in the 2023 issue as a rookie, with photoshoots taking place in Dominica. Her and Larry welcomed their daughter, India Moon, in that same year afterwards. In December, she was named the Swimsuit Issue's Rookie of the Year. She was featured in the 2024 and 2025 issues, shot in Mexico and Jamaica respectively. In 2026, she finally appeared as one of the issue's cover models, alongside Alix Earle, Hilary Duff, and Tiffany Haddish.

In addition to her fashion work, Williams English has dabbled in activism. Pulling from her childhood connection to animals, she has become an animal welfare activist, being the US Celebrity Ambassador for World Animal Protection. She promotes plant-based living and is an ambassador for Beyond Meat. Williams English has said that she engages in thrift shopping and used ethically sourced fand produced fabrics in her products, and has also stated that her makeup and a sizable portion of her skincare routine use cruelty-free brands. In 2026, she also returned to reality television after a decade, being featured in the Hulu reality series The Girls, which follows the lives of various friends of Khloé Kardashian. Williams English has stated that she had been close with the Kardashians since her days on WAGS LA.
