= Kelly Kelly =

American professional wrestler (born 1987)

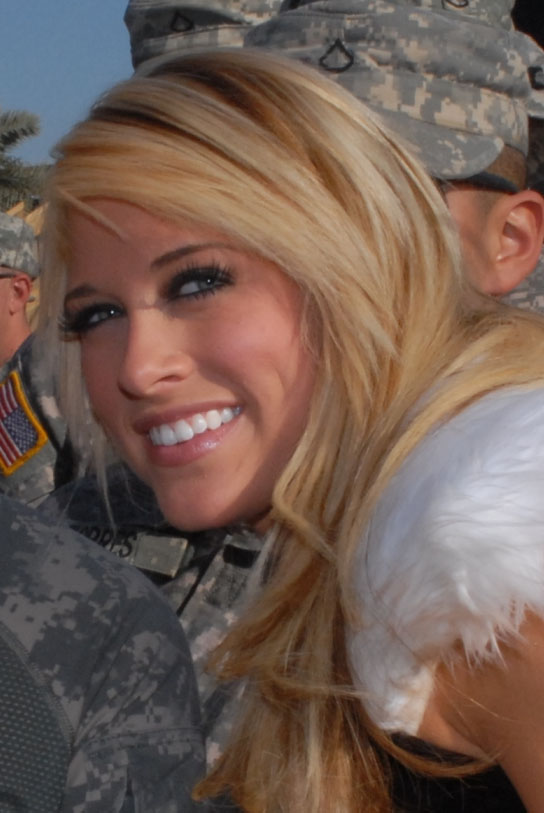
- Blank in 2008

Personal information
- Born: Barbara Jean Blank; January 15, 1987 (age 39) Jacksonville, Florida, U.S.
- Spouses: Sheldon Souray (m. 2016; div. 2017) Joe Coba (m. 2021)
- Children: 2

Professional wrestling career
- Ring name: Kelly Kelly
- Billed height: 5 ft 5 in (165 cm)
- Billed weight: 108 lb (49 kg)
- Billed from: Jacksonville, Florida
- Trained by: Ohio Valley Wrestling
- Debut: 2006
- Retired: 2012

Barbara Jean Coba (née Blank; January 15, 1987), known professionally as Barbie Blank and by her ring name Kelly Kelly, is an American model and former professional wrestler. She is signed to WWE, as an ambassador.

Blank has a background in gymnastics and cheerleading, and worked as a model for Venus Swimwear and Hawaiian Tropic. In 2006, Blank was signed to a contract by WWE and, after training in Ohio Valley Wrestling, she debuted on the ECW brand in June 2006 as "Kelly Kelly". Primarily appearing in a non-wrestling role, she was a member of Extreme Exposé with Layla and Brooke Adams. Beginning in late 2007, she began participating in more wrestling matches, and unsuccessfully challenged for both the WWE Divas Championship and the WWE Women's Championship on multiple occasions. In June 2011, she won the WWE Divas Championship, commencing a four-month reign. She retired from WWE in 2012, but has since returned for occasional appearances and matches. On the Raw Reunion special on July 22, 2019, she pinned Gerald Brisco to win the WWE 24/7 Championship, becoming the first woman to win the title. She is a two-time champion in WWE and has stayed a babyface during her entire tenure in the company.

Blank has also appeared on a number of television shows and was a main cast member of the reality television program WAGS. She made her film acting debut in Disturbing the Peace, which was released on January 17, 2020.

== Early life ==
Barbara Jean Blank was born on January 15, 1987, in Jacksonville, Florida, to a Jewish father and Christian mother. She was a fan of professional wrestling as a child, and cites Stone Cold Steve Austin as her favorite wrestler. While growing up, she participated in gymnastics for ten years, before she was forced to quit due to an injury. She later took up cheerleading. She attended University Christian School and graduated from Englewood High School. She then attended Florida Community College at Jacksonville, where she studied broadcast journalism, hoping to become a television anchor. She was also a Hawaiian Tropic and Venus Swimwear bikini model before she entered professional wrestling.

== Professional wrestling career ==
=== World Wrestling Entertainment / WWE (2006–2012, 2017–2022) ===
==== Developmental territories (2006–2007) ====
In 2006, while working as a model, Blank was seen by World Wrestling Entertainment (WWE) official John Laurinaitis, who was interested in signing her to a contract. WWE contacted her modeling agency and invited her to their developmental territory, Ohio Valley Wrestling (OVW), for a tryout. Despite having no previous wrestling experience she was offered a contract, which she signed in May 2006. Even after being called up to the main roster she continued to fly back and forth to OVW's base city Louisville, Kentucky, once a week to work shows; first as a ring announcer and referee, then as a wrestler. One of her first matches took place at the September 6 television tapings where she participated in a Women's battle royal won by ODB. In late 2007, she also made an appearance in Florida Championship Wrestling, WWE's new developmental territory.

==== ECW and Extreme Exposé (2006–2008) ====
Blank debuted for the ECW brand as Kelly Kelly. Originally, she was to be named just "Kelly", but her ring name was expanded to "Kelly Kelly" by WWE CEO Vince McMahon. She made her debut on the first episode of the weekly television program on June 13, 2006, becoming the youngest Diva on the WWE roster, aged 19. Her character, an exhibitionist, was introduced performing a striptease for the crowd. The next week, while performing another striptease, Kelly was interrupted by her on-screen boyfriend, Mike Knox, who came to the stage and covered her with a towel before dragging her backstage. Her stripping became a weekly segment known as Kelly's Exposé and usually followed the same routine; Kelly would dance and strip until she was stopped by Knox. Knox began forcing Kelly to accompany him to ringside so he could keep an eye on her, making her his de facto valet. As a result, she found herself involved in the feud developing between Knox and his tag team partner Test and the team of Tommy Dreamer and The Sandman. This included her being inadvertently hit with a cane by Sandman when Knox used her as a shield. She made her ECW in-ring debut on the August 22, edition of ECW During an extreme bikini contest segment between Torrie Wilson and herself, Test and Mike Knox interrupted the contest stopping Kelly before she had a chance to disrobe. Leading Tommy Dreamer and Sandman to come in through the crowd, Sandman took the mic and challenged Test, Knox and Kelly in a six-person mixed tag team match. Kelly, Knox and Test went on to lose to Dreamer, Sandman, and Wilson.

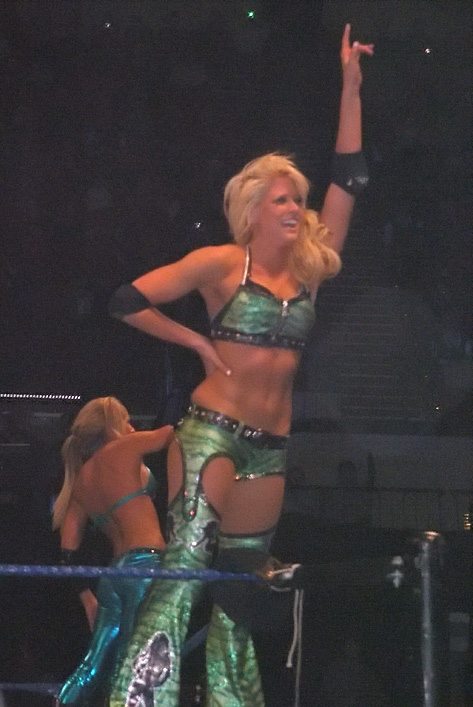
Blank during a house show in June 2008

Kelly and Knox progressed into a storyline with CM Punk in September, in which Kelly developed a liking for Punk, flirting with him and watching his matches, and Knox became increasingly jealous. This led to a match between Knox and Punk, during which Kelly cheered for Punk. At December to Dismember, Kelly and Knox faced Ariel and Kevin Thorn in a mixed tag team match, during which Knox refused to tag in before leaving her. On the following episode of ECW, Kelly defeated Ariel with a roll-up in her first singles match. Afterward, Knox made his way to the ring with flowers, but ended up performing his signature swinging reverse STO on her, ending their relationship and giving her a scripted injury—removing her from television for six weeks.

She returned on January 16, 2007, to announce she was newly single and bringing back Kelly's Exposé. The following week, she joined forces with Layla and Brooke to form Extreme Exposé. The trio performed a weekly dance segment on ECW for the next several months. On November 1, Brooke was released from her WWE contract, and Extreme Exposé dissolved as a group. This left Kelly and Layla to enter an ongoing rivalry with more active wrestling roles. On the October 29 episode of Raw, Kelly won a battle royal to earn a match against the WWE Women's Champion, Beth Phoenix. Kelly lost the match the following week on Raw. Kelly continued to feud with Layla, and they were on opposite sides of a 10-Diva tag team match at Survivor Series, which Kelly's team won. In April 2008, Kelly was part of the losing team in a five-on-five Divas match at the Backlash pay-per-view.

==== Various storylines and championship pursuits (2008–2011) ====
In July, Kelly was moved to the Raw brand and debuted for the brand by teaming with Mickie James to defeat Layla and Jillian Hall. She quickly became involved in a feud with Beth Phoenix, facing her on multiple occasions in both singles and tag team matches with a variety of partners, including Mickie James and Candice Michelle. In September, Kelly transitioned into a feud with Phoenix's ally, Jillian Hall. At the Survivor Series pay-per-view in November, Kelly was part of the victorious team in a five-on-five elimination match. During the match, she eliminated Victoria, before being eliminated by Maryse. The following month at the Armageddon pay-per-view, Kelly teamed with Maria, Michelle McCool, and James in a winning effort against Hall, Maryse, Victoria, and Natalya.

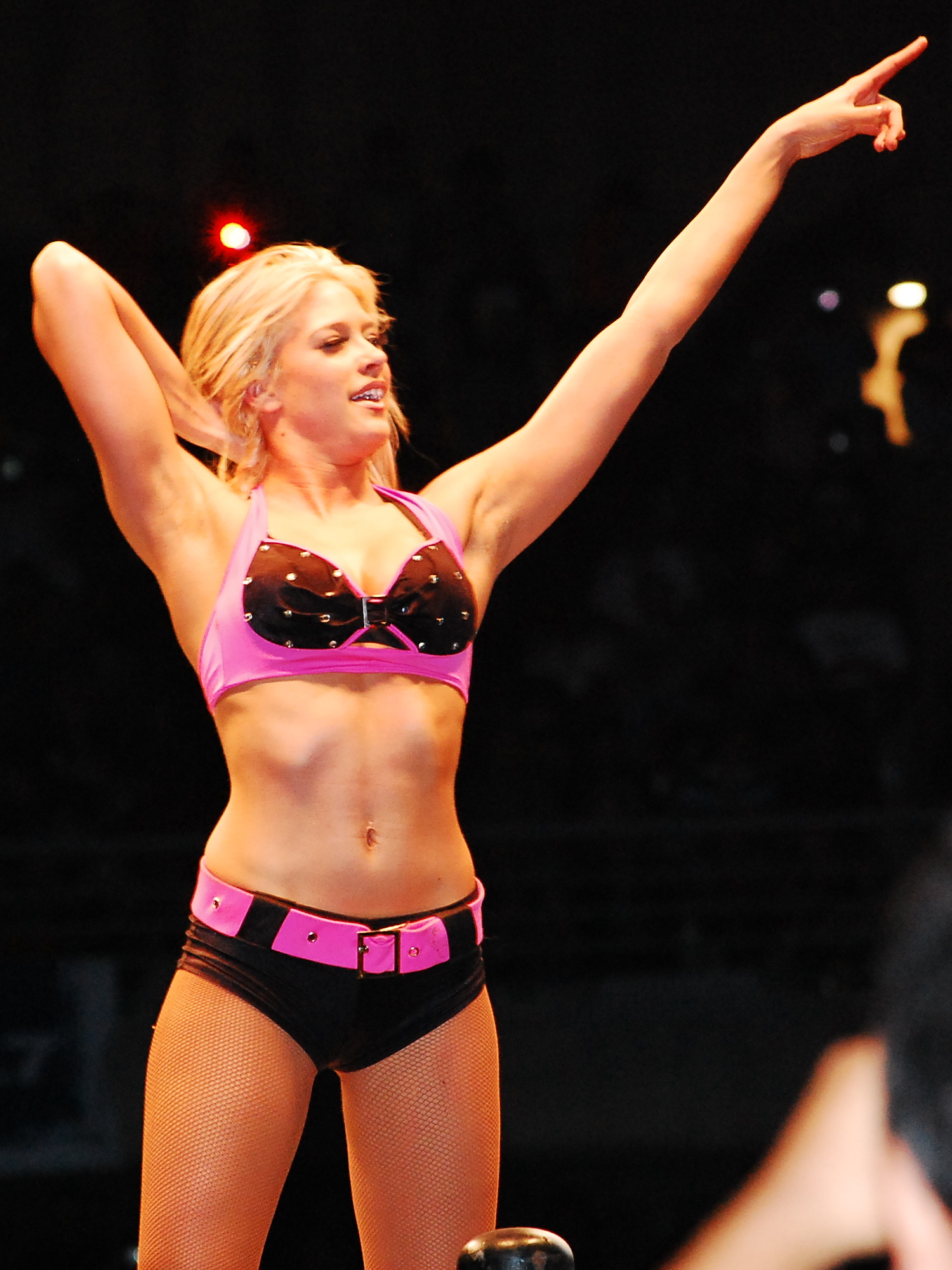
Blank posing on the turnbuckles in 2008

On the May 18 episode of Raw, Kelly won a battle royal to become the number one contender to the WWE Divas Championship. The following week, she challenged Maryse for the championship and won by disqualification, with Maryse retaining the title. Kelly lost a rematch by pinfall two weeks later on June 8. In June, she competed in a fatal four-way match to determine the number one contender, but the match was won by James. Throughout the remainder of mid-2009, Kelly unsuccessfully competed in several number one contender matches.

At the Bragging Rights pay-per-view in October, Kelly, Gail Kim, and Melina comprised Team Raw, but lost to Team SmackDown (Phoenix, Natalya, and McCool). The following month at the Survivor Series pay-per-view, Kelly participated in a five-on-five elimination match, which her team won. She eliminated Layla before being eliminated by Phoenix. In January 2010, Kelly participated in the tournament to determine a new Divas Champion, after Melina was forced to vacate the championship due to injury. She was eliminated by Alicia Fox in the first round. Throughout early 2010, Kelly was involved in several backstage segments with the guest hosts of Raw. At WrestleMania XXVI, Kelly teamed with Phoenix, Kim, James, and Eve Torres in a losing effort to McCool, Layla, Maryse, Fox, and Vickie Guerrero. The following night on Raw, the teams faced off in a rematch with the opposite result. The following week, Kelly took part in a 10-Diva Dress To Impress battle royal, to determine the number one contender for Maryse's Divas Championship, but the match was won by Torres.

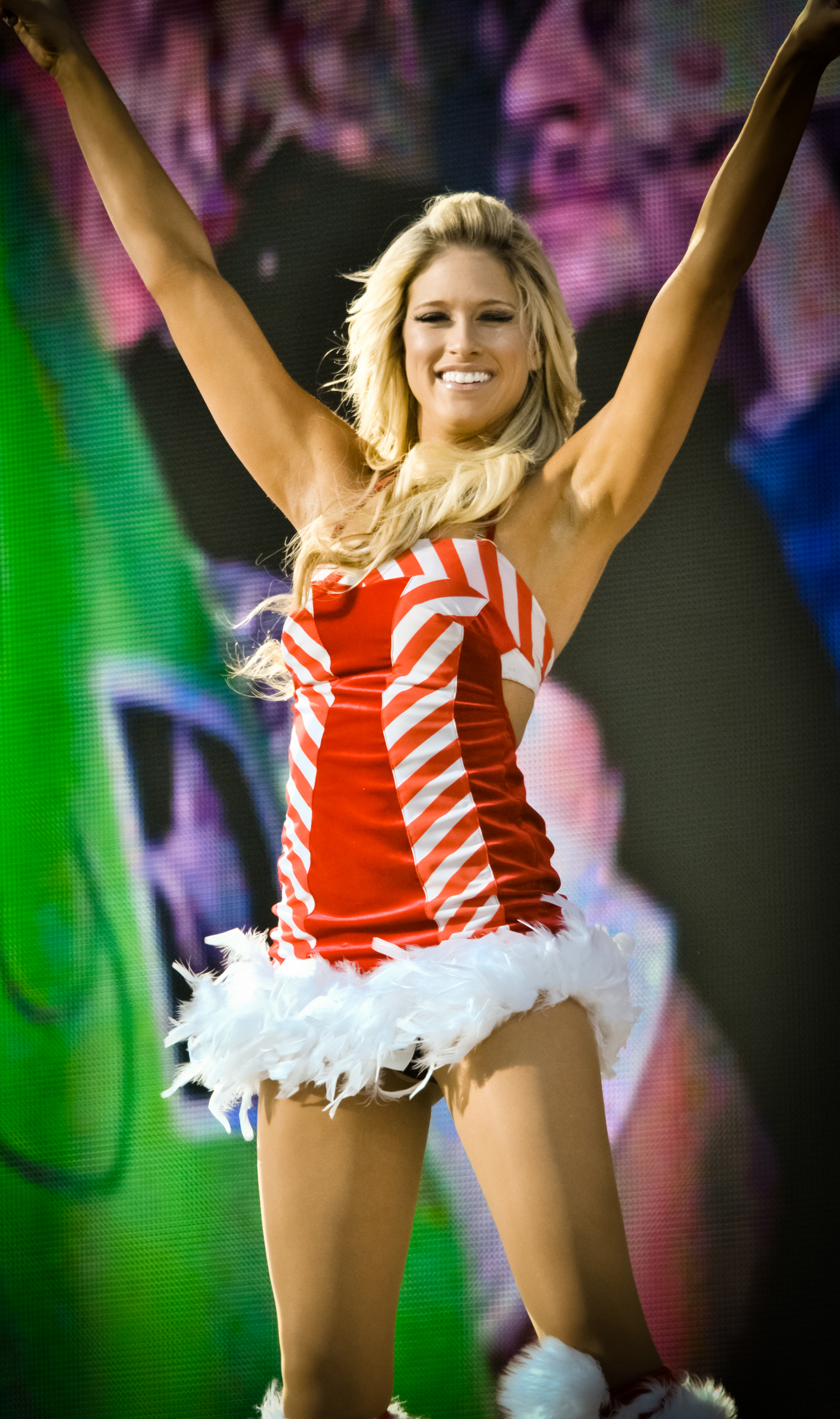
Blank at the 2010 Tribute to the Troops show

During the 2010 WWE Draft on April 26, Kelly was drafted to the SmackDown brand, making her the first drafted female wrestler on television. She quickly began to feud with LayCool (Michelle McCool and Layla), and gained an ally in Tiffany. After defeating both Layla and McCool in singles matches, she received another WWE Women's Championship match at the Money in the Bank pay-per-view in July, but was unsuccessful. On August 31, Kelly announced that she would be a mentor on season three of NXT, with Naomi as her rookie. Throughout the second half of 2010, Kelly continued to feud with LayCool, and gained an ally in Natalya in October. In November, Kelly's NXT rookie, Naomi was named runner-up to the winner, Kaitlyn during the season finale.

On January 30, 2011, at the Royal Rumble, Kelly prevented the acting general manager Vickie Guerrero from interfering in the World Heavyweight Championship match between Edge and Dolph Ziggler. On the following SmackDown, Kelly and Edge defeated LayCool and Ziggler in a two-on-three handicap match to retain Edge's World Heavyweight Championship by executing Edge's finisher, the spear, on Layla and pinning her. Afterwards, Guerrero fired Kelly in storyline, after she had banned Edge from using the spear the week prior. At the Elimination Chamber pay-per-view later that month, Kelly was re-hired by SmackDown general manager Teddy Long, and made her return by attacking Guerrero. She was stopped by LayCool, who were in turn stopped by Trish Stratus. The next week, on SmackDown, Kelly and Edge defeated Guerrero and Drew McIntyre in a mixed tag team match, causing Guerrero to be fired in storyline per the pre-match stipulation.

==== Divas Champion (2011–2012) ====
On April 26, Kelly was drafted back to the Raw brand as part of the 2011 supplemental draft, where she received a push and began feuding with The Bella Twins. On May 22 at the Over the Limit pay-per-view, Kelly unsuccessfully challenged Brie Bella for the WWE Divas Championship. The following month, on the Power to the People special edition of Raw on June 20, Kelly won a fan vote to determine the challenger for the Divas Championship that night. Kelly went on to win her first WWE Divas Championship by defeating Brie Bella. Her win later garnered her a Slammy Award for Divalicious Moment of the Year. At the Money in the Bank pay-per-view in July, Kelly made her first title defense by defeating Bella in a rematch. On August 1, Phoenix won a battle royal to become the number one contender to Kelly's championship, and afterward attacked Kelly to provoke a feud. Kelly successfully defended her championship against Phoenix at both SummerSlam and Night of Champions. Kelly lost the championship to Phoenix at Hell in a Cell in October, ending her reign at 104 days. In rematches on SmackDown and at Tables, Ladders & Chairs, Kelly failed to regain the title.

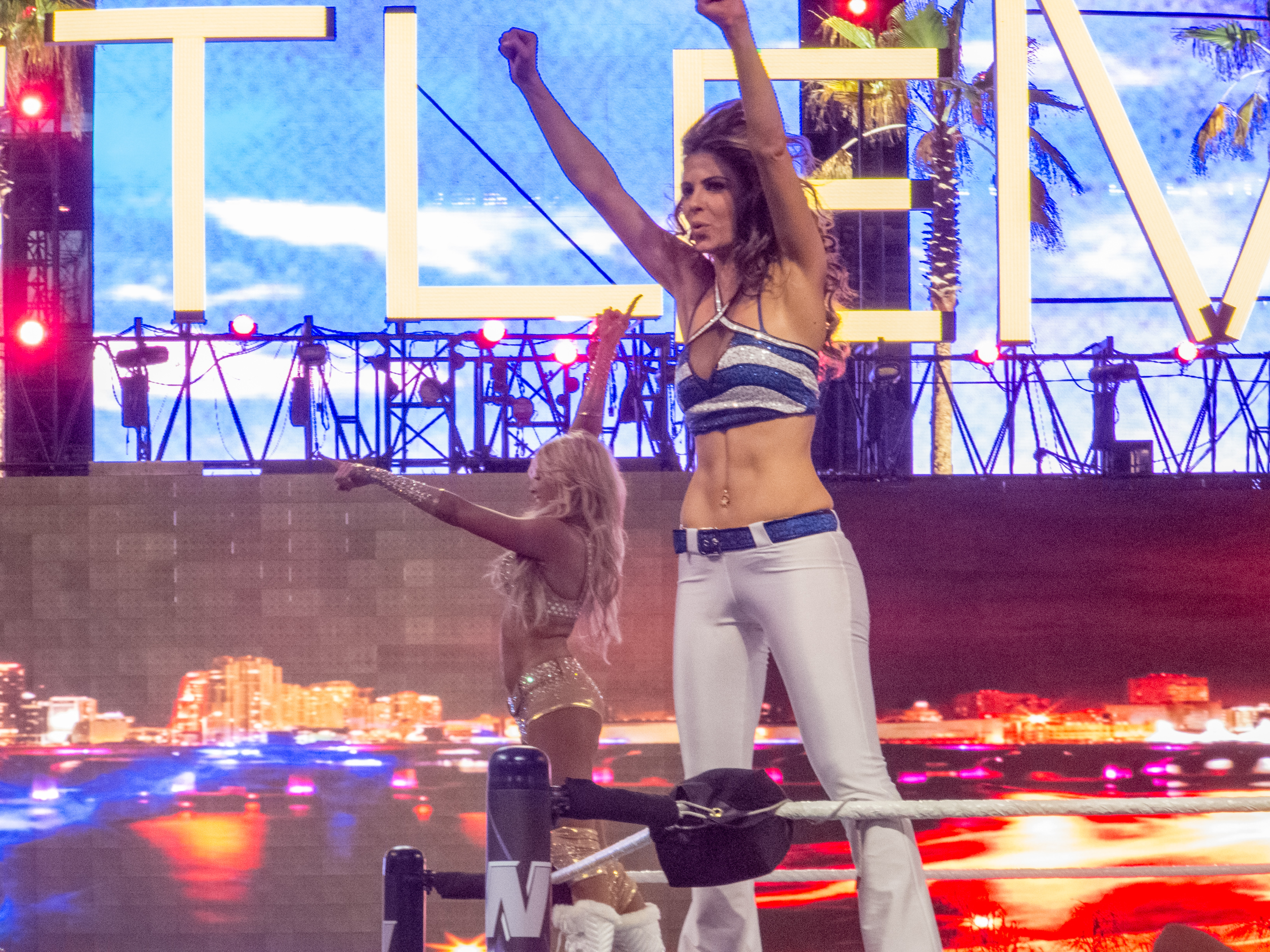
Blank (back) and Maria Menounos (front) celebrate their victory at WrestleMania XXVIII

Kelly spent early 2012 participating in several tag team matches. At WrestleMania XXVIII in April, Kelly and Extra correspondent Maria Menounos defeated Beth Phoenix and Eve in a tag team match. In June, WWE granted Kelly a period of time off, and she returned on Raw on August 6, defeating Eve. On September 28, 2012, Blank was released from her WWE contract. In a December 2012 interview, Blank stated she needed time off to heal a neck injury, and had plans to model.

==== Sporadic WWE appearances (2017–2022) ====
Blank returned to WWE on February 13, 2017, by being featured in a backstage interview for WWE's official website during Raw. She later appeared during WrestleMania weekend, including at the Hall of Fame induction ceremony, and appeared on an episode of the WWE Network exclusive Table for 3 alongside Maryse and Eve Torres.

On January 22, 2018, Blank appeared at the Raw 25 Years special, being honored as one of the historic women of WWE. A few days later, on January 28 at the Royal Rumble event, Blank competed in the first women's royal rumble match, where she entered at number 19, and was eliminated by Nia Jax. In October 2018, Blank participated in a battle royal at WWE's first all-female pay-per-view WWE Evolution, in which she was eliminated by Mandy Rose.

On July 22, 2019, Blank returned during Raw Reunion, where she pinned Gerald Brisco backstage to become the first female 24/7 Champion. Kelly then lost the title to Candice Michelle, with Melina as the special guest referee. She returned to the ring again on January 26, 2020, at the Royal Rumble, entering at number 21 before being eliminated by Charlotte Flair. That year, Blank also appeared in a backstage segment with The Street Profits the following night on Raw and on the November 22 edition of Watch Along.

On the January 7, 2022, episode of SmackDown, Blank was announced as a participant in the women's Royal Rumble match at the namesake event. In what was her third appearance at the Royal Rumble, she entered the match at number 4 and was quickly eliminated by Sasha Banks.

=== Independent circuit (2012, 2018) ===
Blank was set to appear at her first independent wrestling show in Waterbury, Connecticut, at a Northeast Wrestling event on November 4, 2012, followed by a house show event on November 5, but her appearances were canceled due to Hurricane Sandy. Blank eventually made her first appearance for Northeast Wrestling on December 4.

At House of Hardcore 43 in May 2018, Blank made a surprise appearance and helped Chelsea Green defeat Paredyse by tripping his valet, Rebel, off the ring apron.

=== Return to WWE (2025–present) ===
On April 8, 2025, it was reported that Blank had signed a legends deal with WWE.

=== Total Nonstop Action Wrestling (2025) ===
On May 25, 2025, Blank made her Total Nonstop Action Wrestling debut as a heel, performing under her real name during TNA's Border Brawl event, where she served as the ambassador for the USA team who competed against Canada.

== Media appearances and acting roles ==
Blank has appeared in seven WWE video games. She made her in-game debut in SmackDown vs. Raw 2008. Blank also appears in SmackDown vs. Raw 2009, SmackDown vs. Raw 2010, SmackDown vs. Raw 2011, WWE '12,WWE '13 and returned in the games in WWE 2k26 as part of ringside pass.

In April 2007, Blank, along with Ashley Massaro, Layla El, Brooke Adams, Torrie Wilson, and Maryse, appeared in a music video for the Timbaland song "Throw It on Me", featuring The Hives.

On April 11, 2008, Blank along with Mickie James, Melina Perez, and Layla El appeared in an episode of Celebrity Fit Club: Boot Camp as trainers. Six days later, she appeared as a "Soccerette" on the British football show Soccer AM. She appeared a second time on Soccer AM in 2009. On June 14, 2011, Kelly and The Bella Twins appeared on an episode of The Price Is Right. Blank was nominated as "Favorite Butt Kicker" for the 2012 Kids' Choice Awards.

In August 2007, all three members of Extreme Exposé took part in a photo-shoot for FHM. In 2011, Blank was ranked number 82 in Maxim's Hot 100, being the first woman from WWE to appear on the cover of Maxim magazine. Blank was later featured on both the front and back covers of Maxim in December 2011. In 2012, Blank ranked number 38 in Maxim's Hot 100.

Blank was one of the cast members of the E! reality television series WAGS, which began airing in August 2015 and features a look into the personal lives of the wives and girlfriends of sportsmen. The show was canceled in 2018.

Blank made her acting debut on the January 30, 2017, episode of Days of Our Lives, appearing in a scene as a waitress who gives information to one of the show's main characters. Her film debut came in 2020's Disturbing the Peace, as Amanda.

On August 16, 2020, Blank unveiled her new YouTube channel which features video blogs on her daily life.

Music Video
Year	Title	Role	Notes
2007	Throw It on Me	Herself	Music video
Film
Year	Title	Role	Notes
2014	Angel Investors	Rachael	
2020	Disturbing the Peace	Amanda	Film debut
2021	Illusion	Jillian Caldwell	
Television
Year	Title	Role	Notes
2008	Celebrity Fit Club: Boot Camp	Herself/Trainer	April 11, 2008
2008–2009	Soccer AM	Herself/Soccerette	Two Episodes (British TV)
2011	WWE Tough Enough	Herself/Kelly Kelly	May 16, 2011
2011	The Price Is Right	Herself/Kelly Kelly	June 14, 2011
2012	2012 Kids' Choice Awards	Herself/Kelly Kelly	March 31, 2012
2014	Headshots & Handcuffs	Nikki	Episode: "Love Scene"
2015–2017	WAGS LA	Herself	Main role (28 episodes)
2017	Days of Our Lives	Waitress with information	Episode: January 30, 2017
2019	The Real Housewives of Beverly Hills	Herself	Episode: "Fifty Shades of Shade"

== Other works ==
Blank has her own wine label called B Tasteful in collaboration with Smith Devereux Winery. Blank is also a fashion influencer, serving as an ambassador on Instagram for brands including Fashion Nova and PrettyLittleThing.

== Personal life ==
While training at OVW, Blank lived in Louisville, Kentucky. She then lived in Tampa, Florida, prior to moving to Miami, and returned to Tampa in 2010.

Blank was in a two-year relationship with Canadian professional wrestler Andrew Martin (best known as "Test") that had ended prior to his death in March 2009. In 2011, Blank met Canadian ice hockey player Sheldon Souray at a Maxim party, and the pair began dating. They married in Cabo San Lucas, Mexico on February 27, 2016, and split time between Las Vegas, Nevada and Los Angeles, California. The couple separated and filed for divorce in 2017. She had a brief relationship with singer-songwriter Cole Swindell in 2019, but the two broke up three months after making their first public appearance at that year's Academy of Country Music Awards.

In February 2018, Blank's father Ron died. In 2019, Blank founded a non-profit charity with Drs. Shawn Carbonell and Luzanne Otte named Cure Glioblastoma, the same disease her father died from. The purpose of the charity is building awareness and solutions for brain cancer.

On May 29, 2020, Blank got engaged to bodybuilder Joe Coba in Sedona, Arizona. As of August 16, 2020, they reside in Calabasas, California. Blank and Coba married on April 9, 2021, in Oak Glen, California. Their wedding was featured on the Brides magazine. On March 28, 2023, Blank announced that she was pregnant with her first child. In April, she revealed she was expecting twins, giving birth to them on September 10. She gave birth to son Jaxon Matthew and daughter Brooklyn Marie.

== Championships and accomplishments ==
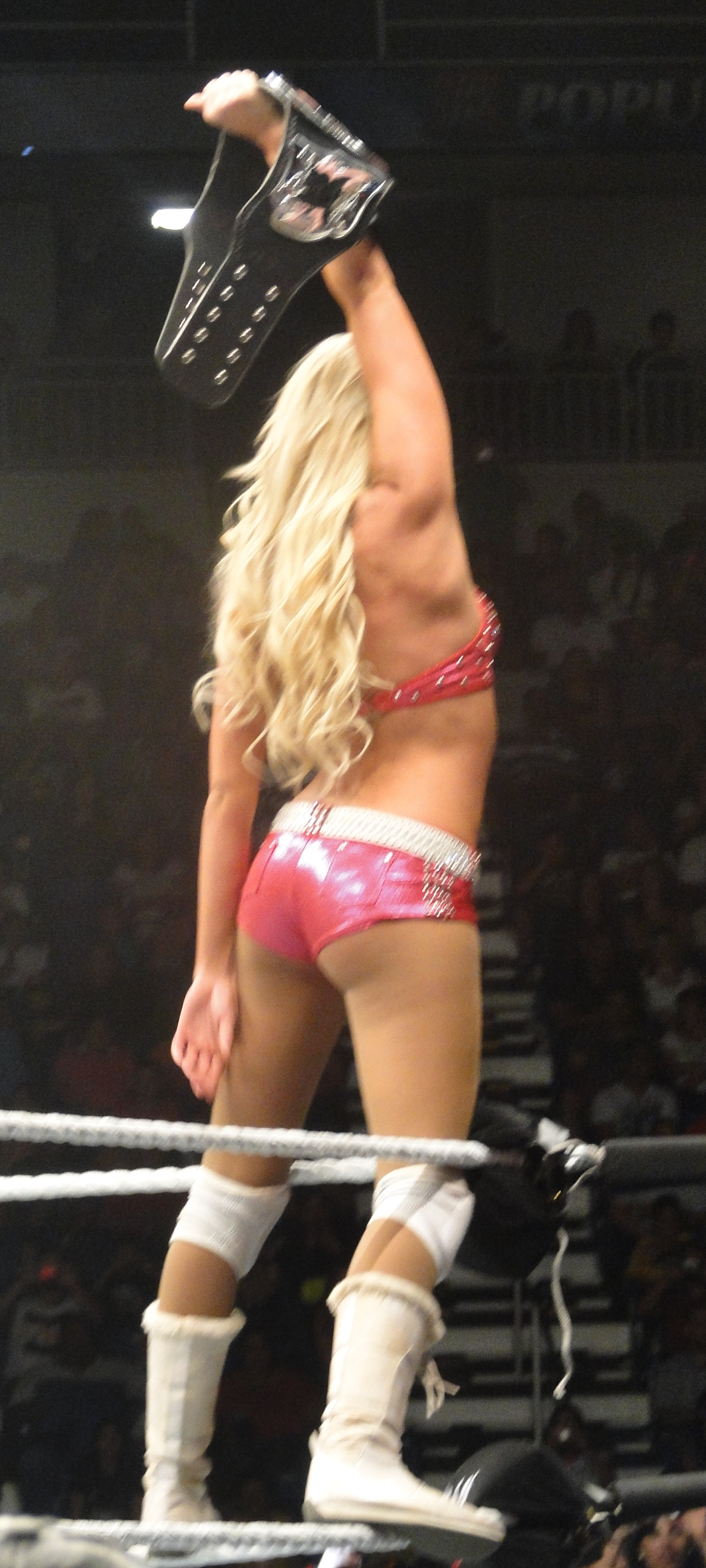
Blank is a former WWE Divas Champion.

- Action Icon Awards
  - Dare2BDifferent Award (2012)
- The Baltimore Sun
  - Most Improved Wrestler of the Year (2008)
- Pro Wrestling Illustrated
  - Ranked No. 15 of the top 50 female wrestlers in the PWI Female 50 in 2011
- WWE
  - WWE Divas Championship (1 time)
  - WWE 24/7 Championship (1 time)
  - Slammy Award (1 time)
    - Divalicious Moment of the Year (2011) – Kelly winning the Divas Championship

== Awards and nominations ==
Year	Award	Category	Nominated work	Result	Ref.
2012	Nickelodeon Kids' Choice Awards	Favorite Buttkicker	—N/a	Nominated	

== See also ==
- List of Jewish professional wrestlers
