= Mizanin =

Mizanin is a surname. Notable people with the surname include:

- Maryse Mizanin (born 1984), born Maryse Ouellet, Canadian-American professional wrestler and actress
- Michael Mizanin (born 1980), known professionally as The Miz, American professional wrestler and actor
