= WAGS Miami =

- Genre: Reality television
- Starring: Astrid Bavaresco; Darnell Nicole; Ashley Nicole Roberts; Claudia Sampedro; Metisha Schaefer; Hencha Voigt; Kayla Cox; Faven Liugetsner
- Country of origin: United States
- Original language: English
- No. of seasons: 2
- No. of episodes: 17

Production
- Executive producers: Amber Mazzola; Lori Gordon
- Production location: Miami, Florida
- Camera setup: Multi-camera
- Running time: 43 minutes
- Production company: Machete Productions

Original release
- Network: E!
- Release: October 2, 2016 – October 8, 2017

Related
- WAGS; WAGS Atlanta

WAGS Miami is an American reality documentary television series that premiered on October 2, 2016, on E! television network, making it the first spin-off of WAGS. The reality show chronicles both the professional and personal lives of several WAGs (an acronym for wives and girlfriends of sportspersons). Amber Mazzola and Lori Gordon serve as executive producers for the series.

== Overview and casting ==
On May 5, 2016, the network ordered WAGS Miami, to serve as the first spin-off to WAGS. It was also revealed the executive producers of WAGS, Amber Mazzola and Lori Gordon, would serve as the series' executive producers for WAGS Miami, and the series is produced and distributed by Machete Productions. It was revealed that the series would follow the same former of its producers by featuring wives and girlfriends of sports stars, however it would be centered in and around Miami. On August 2, 2016, it was revealed that the first season would consist of 8 1-hour-long episodes and features 7 women. The women featured include, Astrid Bavaresco; Vanessa Cole the girlfriend of Mike Wallace; Darnell Nicole the ex fiancée of Reshad Jones; Ashley Nicole Roberts the fiancée of Philip Wheeler; Claudia Sampedro fiancée of Julius Peppers; Metisha Schaefer the ex-girlfriend of Larry English; and Hencha Voigt. The series premiered on October 2, 2016. It was announced on the Reunion Special that WAGS Miami had been renewed for a second season.

On May 4, 2017, it was announced the second season would premiere on August 20, 2017.

== Cancellation ==
WAGS Miami was cancelled on February 1, 2018 due to declining ratings.

== Cast ==
Cast member	Seasons	
Cast member	1	2
Astrid Bavaresco (ex-girlfriend of Michael Crouse)	Main	Main
Vanessa Cole (girlfriend of Mike Wallace)	Main	
Darnell Nicole (ex-fiancée of Reshad Jones)	Main	Main
Ashley Nicole Roberts (wife of Philip Wheeler)	Main	Main
Claudia Sampedro (fiancée of Julius Peppers)	Main	Main
Metisha Schaefer (ex-girlfriend of Larry English)	Main	Main
Hencha Voigt (ex-girlfriend of Colin Kaepernick)	Main	Main
Faven Biru (wife of Corey Liuget)		Main
Kayla Cox (ex-wife of Eric Fornataro)		Main

== Episodes ==
=== Series overview ===
Season	Episodes	Originally released	
Season	Episodes	First released	Last released
1	9	October 2, 2016	November 27, 2016
2	8	August 20, 2017	October 8, 2017

=== Season 1 (2016) ===
No. overall	No. in season	Title	Original release date	U.S. viewers (millions)
1	1	"Welcome To Miami"	October 2, 2016	0.696
2	2	"Ratchet by Association"	October 9, 2016	0.507
3	3	"Girl Code"	October 16, 2016	0.576
4	4	"Birthday Brawl"	October 23, 2016	0.607
5	5	"What Would Vesus Do?"	October 30, 2016	0.460
6	6	"Put a Ring on It"	November 6, 2016	0.398
7	7	"Ring Toss"	November 13, 2016	0.492
8	8	"Girls Be Trippin'"	November 20, 2016	0.473
9	9	"WAGS Miami Reunion Special"	November 27, 2016	0.453

=== Season 2 (2017) ===
No. overall	No. in season	Title	Original release date	U.S. viewers (millions)
10	1	"Bride Wars"	August 20, 2017	0.509
11	2	"Party Girl 2"	August 27, 2017	0.333
12	3	"Dueling Matchmakers 2"	September 3, 2017	0.286
13	4	"Hencha's Revenge"	September 10, 2017	0.330
14	5	"LA Bachelorette Bound"	September 17, 2017	0.294
15	6	"Double Ds 2"	October 1, 2017	0.601
16	7	"Hurricane Phyllis"	October 8, 2017	0.489
17	8	"My Best Friend's Wedding 2"	October 8, 2017	0.372

== See also ==
- WAGS (TV series)
- WAGS Atlanta
- WAGs Boutique
- WAG Nation
