= Scott Henshall =

British fashion designer, philanthropist and TV personality

- Born: York, England
- Education: University of Northumbria
- Occupations: Fashion designer, TV personality, philanthropist, fashion journalist
- Years active: 1998–present
- Known for: Youngest designer at London Fashion Week (1998); "World's Most Expensive Dress" (2004)
- Notable work: £5 million diamond cobweb dress (2004)
- Television: I'm a Celebrity...Get Me Out of Here! (2006), The Weakest Link, Britain's Next Top Model, Project Catwalk
- Awards: Vidal Sassoon Award for Cutting Edge Talent (2000)

Scott Henshall is a British fashion designer, philanthropist, TV personality and occasional fashion journalist.

== Career ==
He debuted in 1998, age 22, then the youngest designer to show at London Fashion Week. His first show was sponsored by Betty's and Wedgwood and featured models with teapots on their heads walking to the sound of smashing teacups.

In 2000, Henshall won the Vidal Sassoon Award for Cutting Edge Talent. He became the youngest creative director ever at British fashion house Mulberry and chose Anna Friel as the face of their campaign.

Henshall was the designer for the dress worn by singer Gemma Abbey of Jemini at the grand final of the 2003 Eurovision Song Contest. Jemini were the first UK act to score 0 points at the contest.

In 2004 he designed a £5 million diamond-encrusted cobweb dress worn by Samantha Mumba at the 2004 premiere of Spider-Man 2 which was later declared the "World's Most Expensive Dress".

== I'm a Celebrity... Get Me Out of Here! ==
In 2006, Henshall appeared in the reality TV show I'm a Celebrity...Get Me Out of Here!. He was voted out of the programme by viewers on 24 November 2006, the second to leave.

Some of Henshall's attempts at the bushtucker trials were not successful. On one trial he was required to dance continually for five songs to earn ten stars, but surrendered after earning only one star.

== Personal life ==
Henshall was born in York and lived in Sheriff Hutton during his early childhood. He attended school in Richmond at Scorton Grammar School and then the Assumption School. He graduated from University of Northumbria in 1997 with a degree in fashion design and textiles.

Henshall is openly gay.

== Television appearances ==
- I'm a Celebrity...Get Me Out of Here! series 6
- Tonight with Trevor MacDonald
- The Weakest Link (Winner, Celebrity/Fashion special)
- Ready Steady Cook (Winner of Celebrity special)
- Loose Women
- Paris Hilton's British Best Friend
- Britain's Next Top Model (Guest judge)
- Make Me a Supermodel (Guest judge)
- Project Catwalk (Guest judge)
- The Clothes Show
- WAGs Boutique
- Dancing on Ice Defrosted
