= Santa's Little Helper (film) =

Santa’s Little Helper
- Directed by: Gil Junger
- Written by: James Robert Johnston; Bennett Yellin
- Produced by: Michael J. Luisi
- Starring: The Miz; AnnaLynne McCord; Paige; Eric Keenleyside; Maryse Mizanin
- Cinematography: Cliff Hokanson
- Edited by: Heath Ryan
- Music by: The Collision Brothers
- Production company: WWE Studios
- Distributed by: 20th Century Fox Home Entertainment
- Release date: November 17, 2015
- Running time: 91 minutes
- Country: United States
- Language: English

Santa's Little Helper is a 2015 American Christmas fantasy comedy film starring The Miz, Paige, AnnaLynne McCord, and Maryse Mizanin. The film was directed by Gil Junger. The film was released direct-to-DVD and digital on November 17, 2015.

== Plot ==
Dax is a greedy, materialistic corporate hatchet-man, who we first see while closing down a community youth center just days before Christmas. Dax is subsequently fired in a corporate power play and, as he has been living beyond his means, loses his girlfriend, car and will soon be evicted from his house.

Meanwhile, at the North Pole, Santa Claus is looking to replace Santa's Little Helper, the second-in-command. Eleanor, the daughter of the outgoing Ho-Ho-Ho believes the job should be hers, but Santa, believing the North Pole could use a human influence, tasks Billie with reviewing Dax as a possible candidate. Billie is a kindly elf who is shunned by many of her elfin brethren because of a genetic defect that gives her round ears.

Billie gives Dax a series of difficult and embarrassing tasks to test his character, occasionally bailing him out with North Pole magic, while not revealing that it is Santa who is looking to hire him. Dax starts poorly but begins to soften during the course of the trials while also developing a mutual attraction to Billie. After Dax helps a mugging victim retrieve a precious ring, Billie declares him fit for the position.

Dax does not believe Billie's claim to work for Santa, so Santa himself arrives at Dax's home to convince him to take the job. A flashback reveals Dax had once been optimistic and friendly until he was framed for stealing money from the youth center he shut down in the film's opening.

Dax accepts the position of Santa's Little Helper, but Eleanor, using an obscure North Pole law, challenges him to the position with the winner being decided through a rigorous obstacle course. Dax loses and Eleanor is named Santa's Little Helper.

Dax returns home, having stolen a magic bell that can make wishes come true and plans to use it to save the youth center. Santa intercedes and halts his attempts at using magic, so Dax gives a rousing speech to rally the community and save the youth center from a wrecking ball and capture the director who really stole the money from it. Santa places Eleanor on the naughty list for her poor sportsmanship during the competition, thus disqualifying her from the position, and reveals it was Billie he was testing for the position of Santa's Little Helper all along. Dax and Billie then share a passionate kiss under a magical snowfall.

== Cast ==
- The Miz as Dax
- AnnaLynne McCord as Billie
- Paige as Eleanor
- Eric Keenleyside as Santa Claus
- Maryse Ouelett Mizanin as Melody
- Peter Kelamis as Ezra Fells
- Nicholas Holmes as Kid #2
- Dylan Schmid as Marcus
- Kathryn Kirkpatrick as Mrs. Claus
- Geoff Gustafson as Fitz
- Tom McLaren as Harvey
- Karen Holness as Miriam
- Ben Wilkinson as Lane
- Mitchell Kummen as Young Dax
- Bruce Blain as Biker #1
- Patrick Sparling as Biker
- John Stewart as Tow Truck Operator
- Anthony Shudra as Birthday Boy
- Austin Abell as Kid #1
- Hector Johnson as Security Guard
- Lucas Rojen as Tommy
- Joshua Morettin as Mike

== See also ==
- List of Christmas films
- Santa Claus in film
