= Maryse Mizanin =

Canadian professional wrestler and model (born 1983)

- Maryse in 2012

Personal information
- Born: Maryse Ouellet; January 21, 1983 (age 43) Montreal, Quebec, Canada
- Spouse: The Miz (m. 2014)
- Children: 2

Professional wrestling career
- Ring name(s): Maryse; Maryse Ouellet
- Billed height: 5 ft 8 in (173 cm)
- Billed weight: 115 lb (52 kg)
- Billed from: Montreal, Quebec, Canada
- Trained by: Al SnowDave Finlay; Steve Keirn; Ricky Steamboat; OVW; FCW
- Debut: 2006

Maryse Mizanin (née Ouellet; born January 21, 1983) is a Canadian media personality, model, actress and retired professional wrestler. She is best known for her tenures in WWE, where she performed mononymously as Maryse.

After spending years modeling, including winning Miss Hawaiian Tropic Canada in 2003, Mizanin participated in the WWE Diva Search competition and was hired by WWE in 2006. She spent time in developmental territories Ohio Valley Wrestling and Florida Championship Wrestling, before being assigned to the SmackDown brand in 2008. That year, Maryse won her first WWE Divas Championship.

In 2009, she was drafted to the WWE Raw brand, and won the Divas Championship for the second time in 2010, making her the first woman to hold it more than once. In 2010, she co-hosted NXT and managed Ted DiBiase, prior to her release from the company in 2011. In 2016, she returned to the company and became the manager of her husband The Miz. That year, she joined the cast of the reality show Total Divas. In 2018, WWE announced a spin-off show titled Miz & Mrs., which starred Mizanin. She and her husband also served as executive producers.

== Early life and career ==
Ouellet was born in Montreal, Quebec, but grew up in Edmundston, New Brunswick. In high school, Ouellet was the only girl in her class, and ran the school's fashion show. She also began developing a range of makeup products. Ouellet began her modeling career as a beauty pageant contestant, winning Miss Hawaiian Tropic Canada 2003 and finishing second at the International Finals of Miss Hawaiian Tropic 2004. She was also on the cover of Playboy's 2007 Girls of Canada calendar.

== Professional wrestling career ==
=== World Wrestling Entertainment / WWE (2006–2011) ===
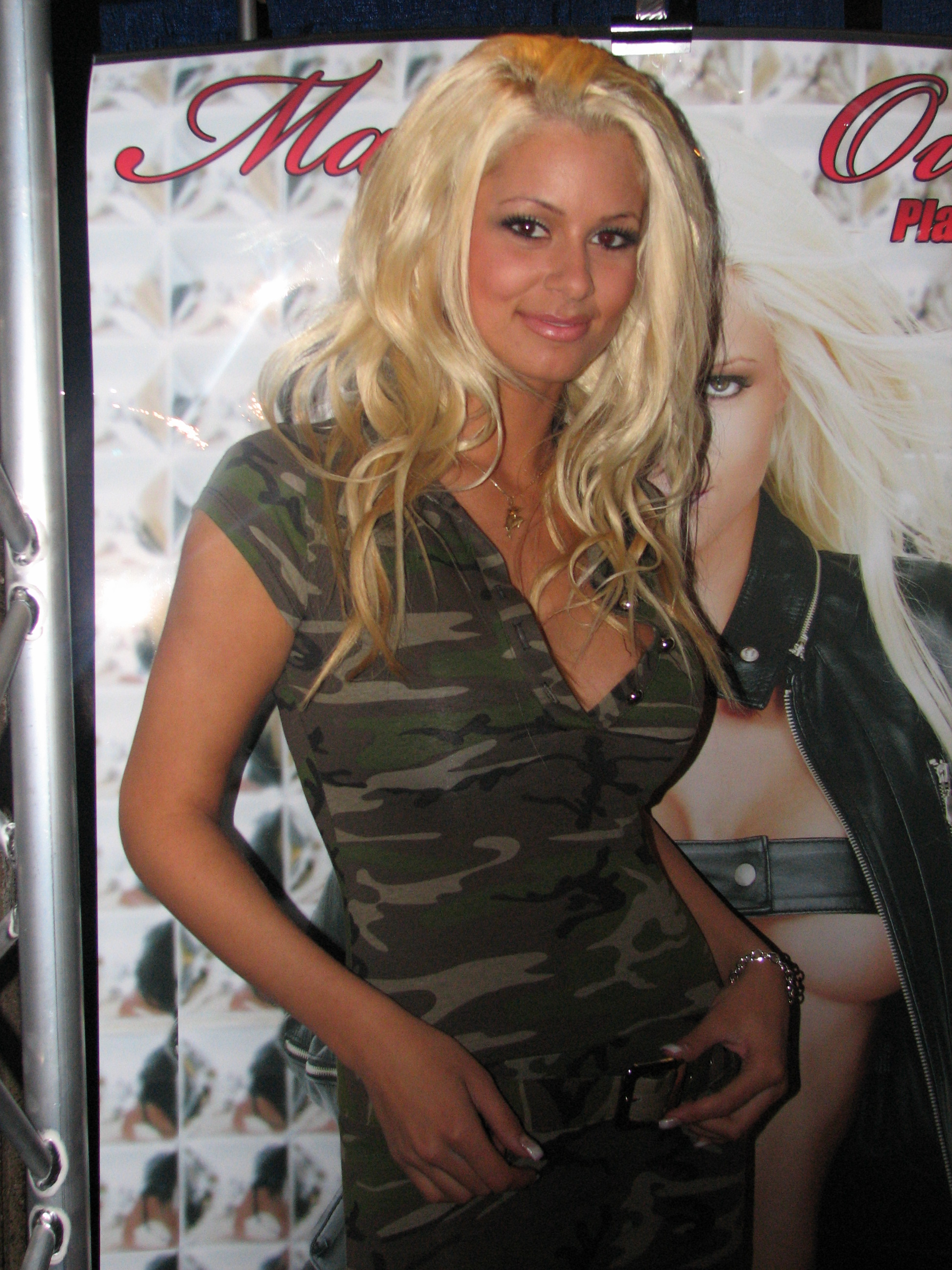
Maryse in 2006

==== Diva Search and developmental territories (2006–2007) ====
In mid-2006, Ouellet tried out for World Wrestling Entertainment (WWE)'s Diva Search. She made the final cut and was one of the top eight contestants, but was the second person eliminated on July 24. Despite her elimination, she was invited to observe workouts and the training facility at WWE's developmental territory, Ohio Valley Wrestling (OVW), along with Brooke Adams. Ouellet later said that she was "very, very excited", as it was her "dream to become a WWE Diva".

Ouellet was officially signed to a WWE developmental contract on August 24, 2007, and was assigned to OVW for training. She made her in-ring debut at an OVW live event in December 2006. In March 2007, she began wrestling in dark matches prior to the OVW television tapings. In mid-2007, Ouellet began managing Sylvain Grenier. When Florida Championship Wrestling (FCW) opened in mid-2007, Ouellet was transferred to the new developmental facility, and on September 25, she made her FCW debut as the valet of Ryan O'Reilly along with Lacey Von Erich. Ouellet then started competing in singles and tag team competition, before managing Ted DiBiase, Jr. in December 2007, and was at ringside when he captured the FCW Southern Heavyweight Championship.

==== Early storylines (2006–2008) ====
On the September 22, 2006, episode of SmackDown!, Ouellet, known as simply Maryse, was shown on the TitanTron welcoming the Montreal viewers in French to the season premiere of SmackDown! on the CW Network. Maryse made her first official televised appearance on the May 21, 2007, episode of Raw to present American rapper Timbaland's new music video for the single "Throw It on Me", in which she had appeared.

By the time she began appearing regularly on SmackDown at the beginning of 2008, she had adopted a snobby attitude and become a villainous character. On the March 7, 2008, episode of SmackDown, Maryse competed in a swimsuit contest against Victoria, Michelle McCool, Cherry, and Eve Torres, which ended in a brawl between Maryse and Torres. The following week, she was the first eliminated from another swimsuit competition. On March 28, Maryse competed in a "Wet and Wild" match, teaming with Victoria against Cherry and McCool in a losing effort. On a "SmackDown after the bell" video on WWE's website, the tag team Deuce 'n Domino dumped Cherry, who had been their manager, and replaced her with Maryse. Maryse then insulted Cherry, only for Cherry to slap her. On the May 16 episode of SmackDown, Maryse made her in-ring debut in a loss to Cherry, though she defeated Cherry in a rematch the following week. On the June 6 episode of SmackDown!, SmackDown General Manager Vickie Guerrero announced the creation of the WWE Divas Championship, and that same night the Divas competed in a Golden Dreams match to qualify for the championship match at The Great American Bash, which was won by Natalya. On the July 4, 2008, episode of SmackDown!, she competed again in another Golden Dreams match to face Natalya for the championship, however she failed to win. For several weeks, Maryse competed in six-person tag team matches with Victoria and Natalya against Cherry, Michelle McCool and Maria. She suffered a minor broken nose after receiving a bulldog from Maria in August 2008.

==== Divas Champion (2008–2010) ====
Maryse began a rivalry with Michelle McCool in September 2008, challenging her for the WWE Divas Championship at Unforgiven, and in a rematch the following week on SmackDown, but failed to win on both occasions. On the September 23 episode of ECW, Maryse defeated McCool in a non-title match. After a month-long absence, Maryse returned at Survivor Series pay-per-view event in November, participating in a five-on-five Divas elimination tag team match, eliminating Kelly Kelly, Mickie James and Candice Michelle; Maryse was the sole survivor of her team, but was ultimately eliminated by Beth Phoenix. At the Armageddon pay-per-view on December 14, Maryse teamed up with Jillian Hall, Victoria and Natalya in a losing effort to McCool, Maria, Kelly Kelly and Mickie James in an Eight-Diva Santa's Little Helper tag team match. On December 19, Maryse pinned Maria to become the number one contender for Michelle McCool's Divas Championship. The following week on SmackDown, Maryse defeated McCool, with Maria as the special guest referee, to win her first Divas Championship. On December 28, at a house show in Raleigh, North Carolina, Maryse dislocated her knee in a tag team match against The Bella Twins (Nikki and Brie). It was later announced that the injury was not major, and therefore only missed a few weeks action. On the January 23, 2009, episode of SmackDown, Maryse returned and sat at ringside commentating during a Divas' tag team match. She returned to in-ring action on February 20, teaming with Michelle McCool in a win against Maria and Eve Torres, where she pinned Torres.

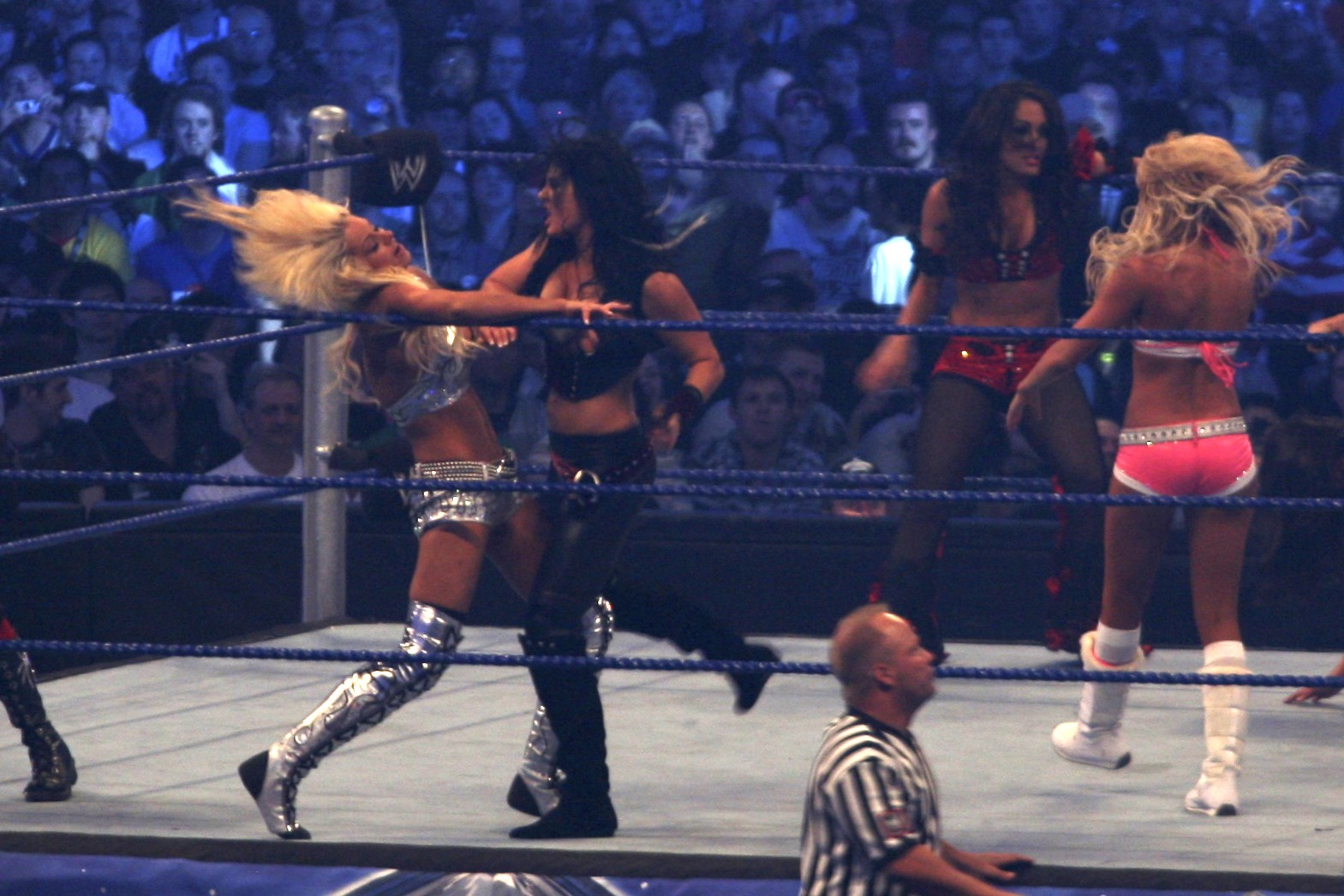
Maryse wrestling Katie Lea Burchill during the WrestleMania XXV event in April 2009

Maryse made her first appearance on Raw on March 2, as a commentator for a match involving the WWE Women's Champion Melina, with Maryse attacking her after the match. The following week, Maryse made her in-ring debut on Raw in a champion vs champion lumberjill match, which she defeated Melina. The rivalry extended to a tag team match on SmackDown on March 13, where Melina and Maria defeated McCool and Maryse. On March 27 episode of SmackDown, Maryse made her first championship defense, losing by disqualification after the returning Gail Kim attacked Maryse and McCool, and thus retained the championship. On April 5, Maryse competed in a 25-Diva Miss WrestleMania battle royal at WrestleMania XXV, but she was eliminated by Beth Phoenix and the match was won by Santina Marella (Santino Marella dressed in drag). Maryse made her last appearance on SmackDown on April 24, retaining her championship against Gail Kim.

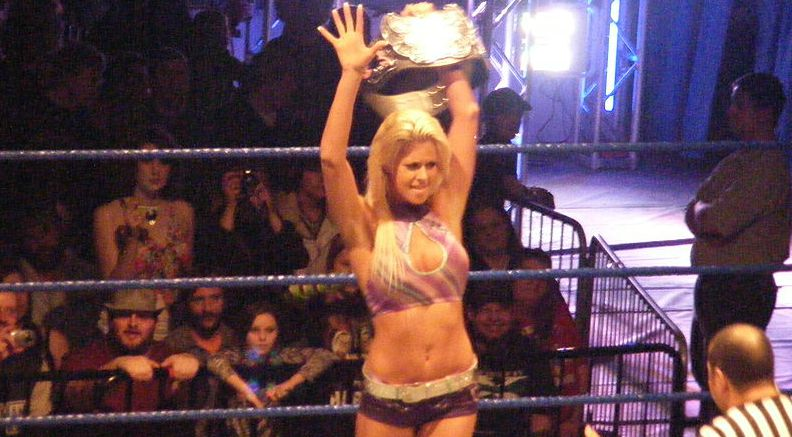
Maryse as Divas Champion in 2009

As part of the 2009 WWE Draft on April 13, Maryse was drafted to the Raw brand, and in the process, the Divas Championship became exclusive to Raw. She made her first appearance as part of the brand on April 27, teaming with Beth Phoenix, Rosa Mendes, and Jillian Hall in a loss to Santina Marella, Mickie James, Brie Bella and Kelly Kelly. Maryse then began feuding with Mickie James after she cost James a number one contender's battle royal, which was eventually won by Kelly Kelly, by spraying hairspray in her eyes. The following week, Maryse lost a championship match against Kelly by disqualification, meaning the championship did not change hands, and won a rematch by pinfall two weeks later on June 8. At Night of Champions on July 26, Maryse lost the Divas Championship to James. Despite being only the second Divas champion, her reign of 216 days remained the longest in the title's history for nearly five years, until AJ Lee surpassed her reign in January 2014.

After losing the championship, Maryse underwent a legitimate knee surgery. She returned on the November 23 episode of Raw, disguised as The Gobbledy Gooker, as the guest timekeeper for a Thanksgiving-themed 6-Divas tag team match. After the match, she revealed herself by attacking the Divas Champion Melina. The following week, Maryse made her in-ring return teamed with Jillian Hall in a tag team match against Melina and Gail Kim, where Maryse pinned Melina. On the December 7 episode of Raw, Maryse defeated Gail Kim by dirty tactics, and following the match, Maryse proceed to attack Kelly Kelly, who was working as ring announcer, ordering her to announce she was the next Divas Champion, but was stopped by Melina.

In early 2010, a tournament was held for the newly vacated WWE Divas Championship due to Melina's injury. Maryse entered the tournament, and defeated Brie Bella and Eve Torres in the first round and semi-finals, respectively, to advance to the finals. The tournament's finals were originally scheduled for Elimination Chamber on February 21; instead, the match was changed by the SmackDown General Manager Vickie Guerrero to an interbrand tag team match, where Maryse teamed with her scheduled opponent Gail Kim against LayCool (Michelle McCool and Layla), which was won by LayCool as a result of Maryse abandoning Kim during the match. The following night on Raw, Maryse defeated Kim in the finals to win the championship, becoming the first Diva to have held it twice.

On March 15 episode of Raw, Maryse defeated Kelly Kelly in a non-title match, attacking her after the match before being attacked by Eve Torres and Gail Kim, and saved by LayCool, then joining with them and Vickie Guerrero. On March 26 episode of SmackDown, Maryse teamed up with LayCool, Guerrero and Alicia Fox defeating Beth Phoenix in a 5-on-1 handicap match before being attacked by Kim, Eve, Kelly and Mickie James. At WrestleMania XXVI, on March 28, she was part of the winning team of a 10-Diva tag team match with LayCool, Fox and Guerrero against Phoenix, James, Kim, Torres and Kelly Kelly, but the following night on Raw, she was pinned by Torres in a rematch. Maryse lost the Divas Championship two weeks later to Eve Torres on the April 12 episode of Raw, and was unsuccessful to regain it at Over the Limit pay-per-view in May. At Fatal 4-Way on June 20, Maryse failed to regain the title in a Fatal Four-Way match that also involved then-champion Eve, Gail Kim, and Alicia Fox, which Fox would win pinning her to become the champion.

==== Managing Ted DiBiase (2010–2011) ====
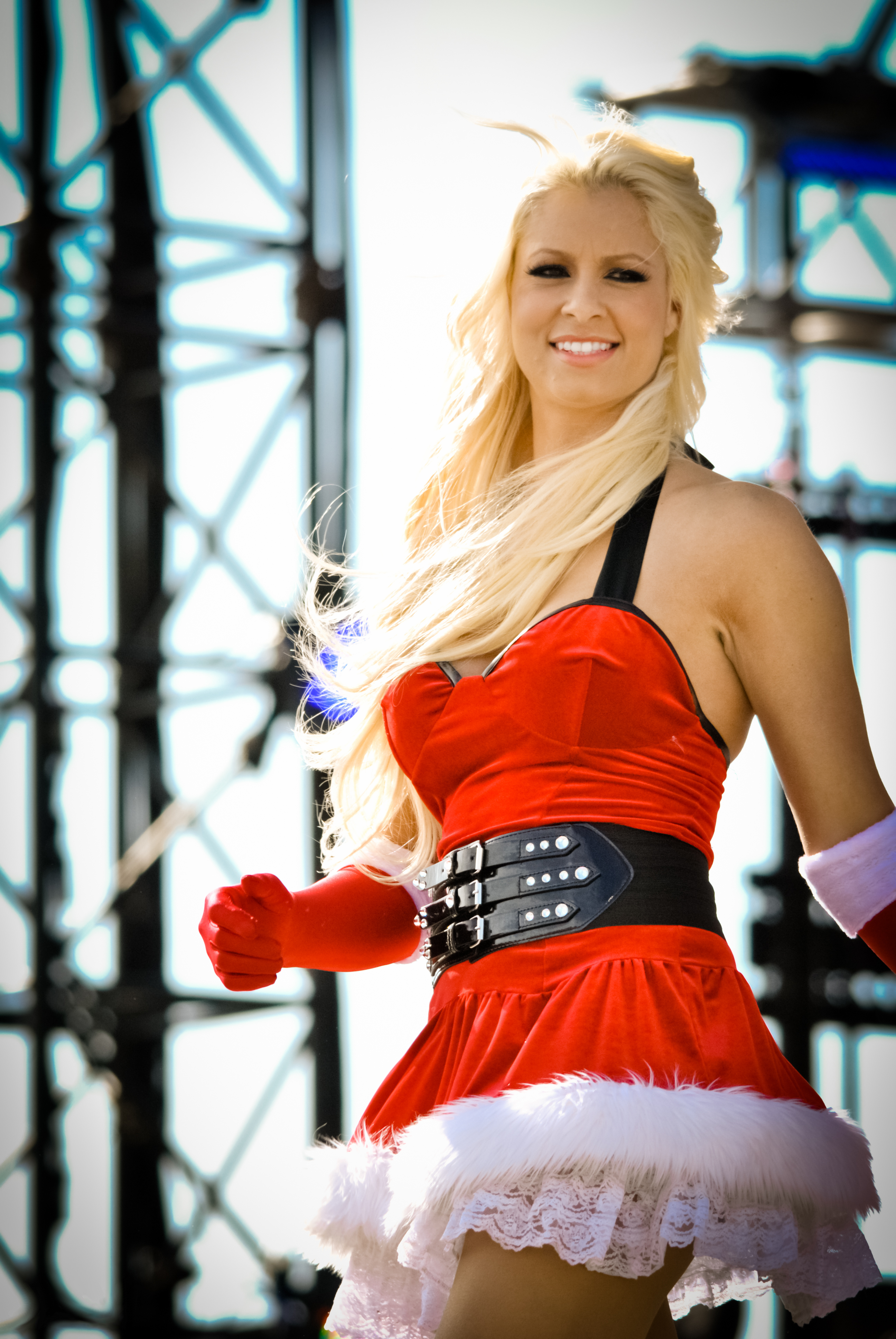
Maryse at the Tribute to the Troops event in December 2010

On the June 21 episode of Raw, after Ted DiBiase Jr. fired Virgil, Maryse became DiBiase's new personal assistant. At Money in the Bank, on July 18, Maryse accompanied DiBiase in his Money in the Bank ladder match for the WWE Championship contract, which she tried to pick the briefcase, but was stopped by John Morrison. Along with DiBiase, Maryse was announced as a mentor for Brodus Clay for the fourth season of NXT on November 30. On Raw, on December 13, Maryse was involved in a battle royal to determine the winner of the Diva of the Year Slammy Award, but was eliminated by Natalya. Clay traded his mentors, Maryse and DiBiase, for Alberto Del Rio on the January 25, 2011, episode of NXT. In late September 2010, Maryse was involved in a storyline with Goldust, in which he stole the Million Dollar Championship from DiBiase, and lost a mixed tag team match against Goldust and Aksana on October 26.

On March 8, Maryse became the co-host of NXT, alongside Matt Striker. As part of NXT Redemption, Maryse was involved in several romantic storylines, most notably with Yoshi Tatsu, Lucky Cannon, and Hornswoggle. In April, DiBiase made an ultimatum to Maryse for her to choose to continue on the NXT or continue with him. The following week, Maryse chose to continue appearing on NXT, disbanding their alliance in the process. In August, Maryse underwent surgery for an abdominal hernia and took time off WWE programming. After two months of inactivity, Maryse was released from her WWE contract on October 28.

=== Independent circuit (2012) ===
On October 5, 2012, Maryse appeared at the Family Wrestling Entertainment (FWE) event Back 2 Brooklyn, performing live commentary. She began appearing regularly for FWE, where she commentated during women's matches.

=== Return to WWE (2016–present) ===
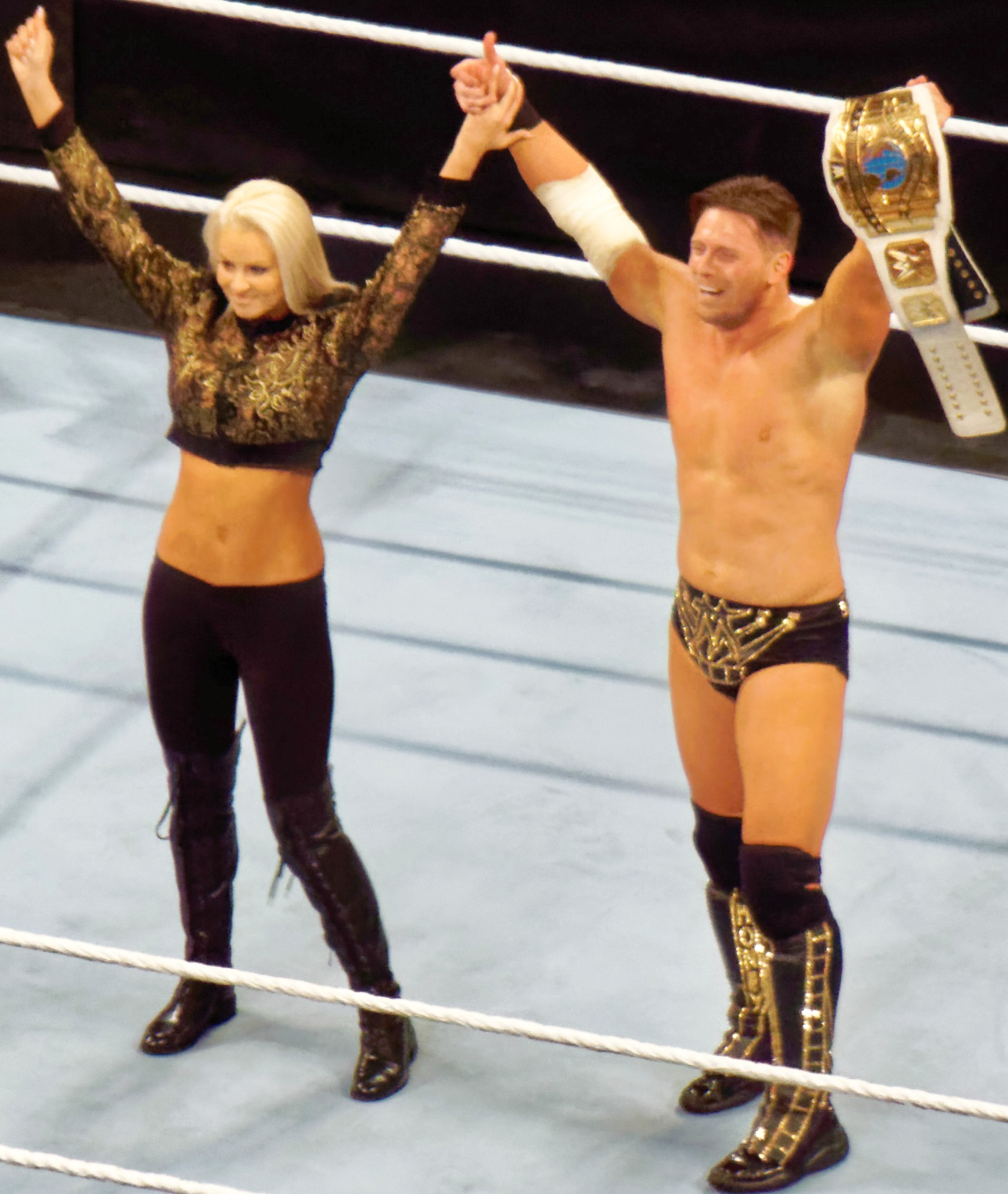
Maryse celebrating along with The Miz after winning the Intercontinental Championship at a Raw event in April 2016

On April 4, 2016, episode of Raw, the episode after WrestleMania 32, Maryse returned during a WWE Intercontinental Championship match between the champion Zack Ryder and her husband, The Miz. During the match, Maryse slapped Ryder's father, who was in the front row, in order to distract Ryder and allowed Miz to capture the championship for the fifth time, thus becoming his manager in the process, where the two then became an on-screen power couple. She formally re-introduced herself three days later on the April 7 episode of SmackDown before once more helping Miz to retain his championship over Ryder. She then began to cut various promos with Miz as his host during the Miz TV segments, while calling themselves the "It" Couple. Following a hiatus due to the shoot of a WWE film, Maryse returned to WWE television on the June 27 episode of Raw, where she helped Miz to retain his championship against Kane after she faked an ankle injury.

After being drafted to Smackdown as part of the 2016 WWE draft which took place on July 19, she helped her husband to retain the title on several occasions.

In February 2017, Maryse was involved in her first feud since her return when she and The Miz feuded with the also real-life couple Nikki Bella and John Cena. This culminated in a mixed tag team match at WrestleMania 33, where Maryse and Miz would lose in what was Maryse's first match in over six years. On April 10, Maryse was drafted to the Raw brand along with Miz as part of the "Superstar Shake Up". On June 4, at Extreme Rules, Maryse was in Miz's corner when he won the WWE Intercontinental Championship for the seventh time by defeating Dean Ambrose. In September, following her pregnancy announcement, Maryse stopped appearing on television. On November 19, 2017, she made an appearance on the Survivor Series pay-per-view crowd watching Miz fight United States Champion Baron Corbin.

On January 22, 2018, in the Raw 25 Years special episode, Maryse was honored as part of a segment involving women considered legends that contributed to the company's success, including the Bella Twins, Kelly Kelly, Lilian Garcia, Torrie Wilson, Michelle McCool, Terri Runnels, Maria Kanellis and the Hall of Famers Jacqueline and Trish Stratus. Later she started making backstage promotional videos with Miz supporting him in the WWE Mixed Match Challenge, in which he won alongside Asuka in April in support of the charity Rescue Dogs Rock.

Maryse returned to Smackdown to manage The Miz in July 2018. Following Maryse's interference in The Miz vs. Daniel Bryan match at Summerslam, Maryse and Miz were put in a mixed tag match by the SmackDown General Manager Paige against Brie Bella and Daniel Bryan at Hell in a Cell on September 16 and won. On the September 11 edition of SmackDown Live, Maryse competed in her first singles match in over 8 years, losing to disqualification to Brie Bella. Following this match, Maryse would again stop appearing on television as Miz began a storyline with Shane McMahon. At Elimination Chamber Maryse returned as a face announcing she and The Miz are having their second child. Although Miz was drafted to SmackDown during the 2019 WWE Draft, Maryse went undrafted. Her first post-draft appearance occurred during a pre-recorded segment on SmackDown in December 2019 for Miz's feud with "The Fiend" Bray Wyatt, where she appeared with Miz at their home. Maryse returned to Raw on April 12, 2021, as part of Miz TV. On the same episode, Maryse accompanied and helped The Miz and John Morrison to defeat Damian Priest in a handicap match.

On November 29, 2021, Maryse made a surprise return to Raw, where she accompanied The Miz and confronted Edge in the middle of his first promo after being drafted back to Raw. She made multiple appearances on Raw in the following weeks, including attempting to interfere in the match between Edge and The Miz at Day 1, where Beth Phoenix returned to confront her. On the following week Raw, Edge and Beth Phoenix challenged The Miz and Maryse to a mixed-tag team match at the Royal Rumble, which The Miz accepted. On January 17, 2022, Maryse attempted to persuade Beth Phoenix to cancel their match at the Royal Rumble, and attacked her with a brick in her purse when she refused. The feud concluded in a mixed tag team match at Royal Rumble where Maryse and The Miz lost the match.

On July 13, 2025 during the Evolution 2 event, Maryse was shown in the crowd alongside several female WWE Hall of Famers and legends, being honored as one of the pioneers of the WWE's Women's Evolution.

== Professional wrestling style and persona ==
Throughout her career, Maryse has been noted for generating heat due to her snobby persona and bossy attitude in the ring, as well as for her comedy skits that often come unexpectedly during her matches and promos.

== Other media ==
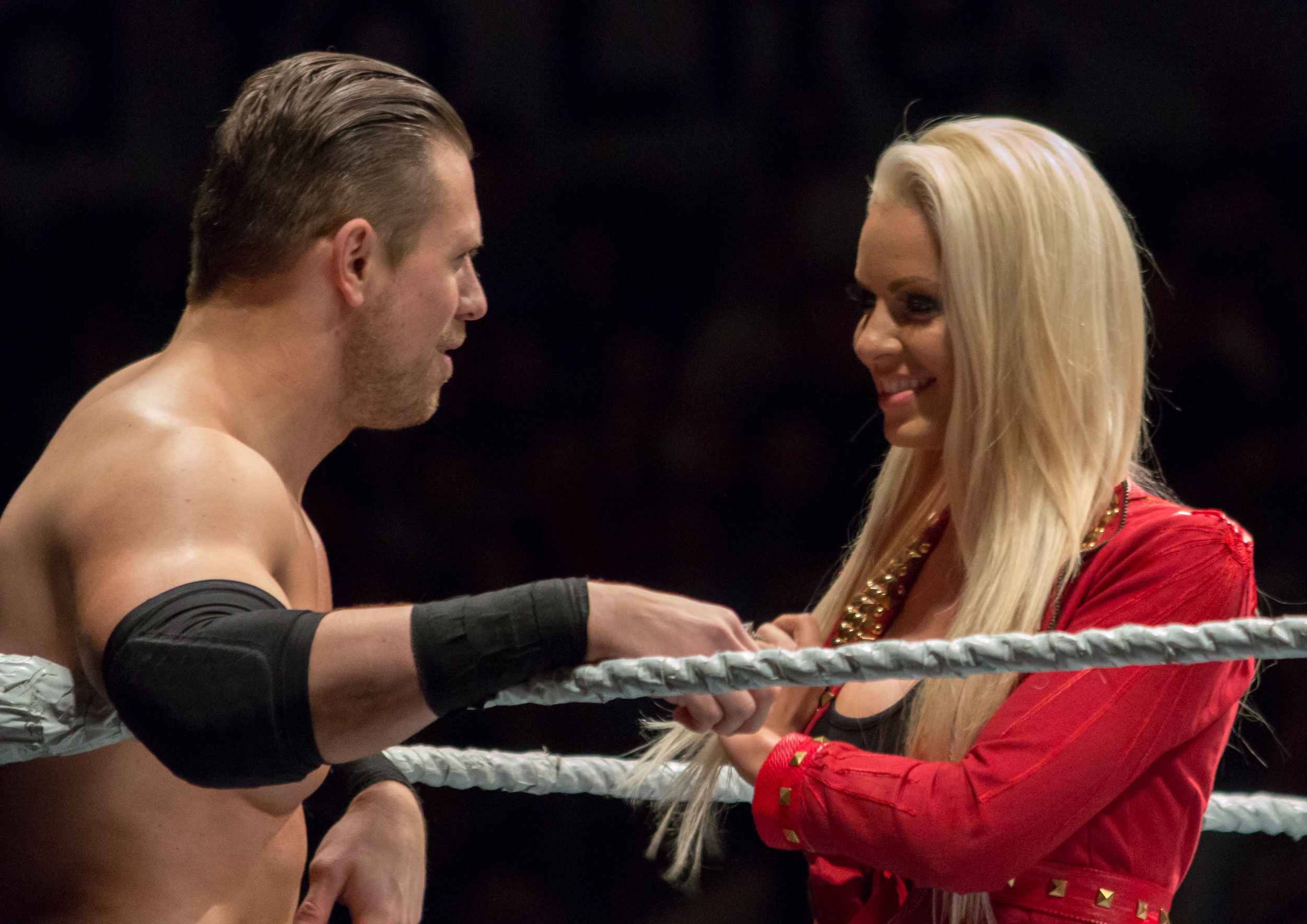
Maryse and Miz in July 2016

In April 2007, she appeared alongside fellow WWE Divas Ashley, Torrie Wilson, Brooke Adams, Layla, and Kelly Kelly in Timbaland's music video "Throw It On Me" featuring The Hives.

Ouellet also made an appearance in the January 2009 issue of Muscle & Fitness, along with Eve Torres and Michelle McCool. She and John Morrison were interviewed on Eurosport in the same year. She also made a special appearance on Redemption Song, which was hosted by WWE wrestler Chris Jericho, along with Candice Michelle, Mickie James, and Eve Torres. She has also appeared in several newspaper interviews, including Tokyo Headline, and was on the cover of Sessions Magazine in October 2010.

In 2012, Maryse was featured on the cover of Le Journal de Montréal, and on MDA Show of Strength with The Miz and other celebrities. In 2015, Ouellet had roles in Sharknado 3: Oh Hell No! and in Santa's Little Helper, the latter starring The Miz. In the same year, she appeared on the E! reality television series WAGS. In 2016, it was announced that Maryse would appear as a main cast member on the sixth season of Total Divas, which prompted her return to WWE. In June 2017, Maryse along with Miz were on the cover of DUB Magazine with a Jeep car.

Maryse has appeared in twelve WWE video games. She made her in-game debut at WWE Smackdown vs. Raw 2010, later appearing in WWE Smackdown vs. Raw 2011, WWE '12, and returned in WWE 2K18, WWE 2K19, WWE 2K20, WWE 2K Battlegrounds, WWE 2K22, WWE 2K23, WWE 2K24, WWE 2K25, and WWE 2K26.

In 2018, Maryse and her husband Mike appeared in a reality television series titled Miz & Mrs. It was later announced on July 26 that Maryse would not be returning for the eighth season of Total Divas.

== Filmography ==
Film
Year	Film	Role	Notes
1994	Octobre	Pouilleuse	Film debut
2015	Sharknado 3: Oh Hell No!	Officer Davis	Television film
2015	Santa's Little Helper	Melody	Straight-to-DVD
2016	Karla	Sidney	
2016	Delilah	Amy Lannigan	
2016	Isle of the Dead	Mikaela Usylvich	
2017	The Marine 5: Battleground	Ana	Straight-to-DVD
2018	Enter the Fist and the Golden Fleecing	Macy Does	
Television
Year	Title	Role	Notes
2008	Redemption Song	Herself	Guest appearance
2010	Musée Eden	Nun in auditorium	1 episode
2011	Trauma	Lemire's wife	1 episode
2012	Unité 9	Yvon's nurse	2 episodes
2015	WAGS	Herself	Episode: "Never Have I Ever"
2016–2018	Total Divas	Herself	Main cast (seasons 6–7): 25 episodes
2018	Total Bellas	Herself	Episode: "What Comes Up, Must Go Down"
2018–2022	Miz & Mrs.	Herself	Main cast Executive producer
2020	Celebrity Game Face	Herself	Episode: "Santa’s Helpers and Holiday Dances"

== Other endeavors ==
Following her release from WWE in 2011, Ouellet announced her plans for a clothing and jewelry line named House of Maryse.

Beginning in late 2013, Ouellet began working as a realtor in Los Angeles after spending a year earning her real estate license.

== Personal life ==
Ouellet is a native speaker of French, fluent in English, and she is able to read Spanish, although she cannot speak it. Ouellet has a tattoo of her late father's name, Guy, on her left wrist. She has a degree in business administration, and holds a black belt in Kyokushin Karate. Her favorite actress is Scarlett Johansson, her favorite bands are Simple Plan and Nickelback, and she loves techno music. Ouellet is vegetarian. She was inspired to become a professional wrestler by Lita whom, along with Victoria, she cites as her dream opponents.

In 2013, Ouellet got engaged to longtime boyfriend and fellow wrestler Mike Mizanin, better known by his ring name, The Miz. The two were married in The Bahamas on February 20, 2014. On March 27, 2018, Maryse gave birth to their first child, a daughter named Monroe Sky Mizanin. During Elimination Chamber on February 17, 2019, the couple announced they were expecting their second child. Their daughter Madison Jade Mizanin was born on September 20, 2019.

On June 27, 2018, Ouellet officially became an American citizen. The couple resides in Thousand Oaks, California, as of 2019.

On February 10, 2024, Maryse announced she had been diagnosed with ovarian serous borderline tumors and would be undergoing a complete hysterectomy.

== Championships and accomplishments ==
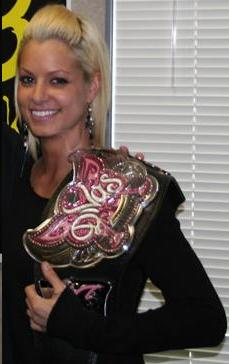
Maryse is a two-time WWE Divas Champion.

=== Beauty pageant ===
- Hawaiian Tropic
  - Miss Hawaiian Tropic Canada (2003)
  - Runner-up International Finals of Miss Hawaiian (2004)

=== Professional wrestling ===
- Bleacher Report
  - Diva/Knockout of the Year (2009)
- Pro Wrestling Illustrated
  - Ranked No. 9 of the top 50 female wrestlers in the PWI Female 50 in 2009
- Live Audio Wrestling End of Year Awards
  - Best Comeback (2009) - as "The Gobbledy Gooker"
  - Best Wrestler: Female/Diva of the Year (2009)
  - Feud of the Year (2009) - with Michelle McCool for the WWE Divas Championship
- The Baltimore Sun
  - Diva of the Year (2009)
- Women's Wrestling Fan Awards
  - Most Improved Wrestler (2008)
  - One to Watch in 2009
  - Heel of the Year (2008)
  - Best Photoshoot of the Year (2009) - ‘Lady in Red’e
  - Most Stylish of the Year (2009)
- World Wrestling Entertainment/WWE
  - WWE Divas Championship (2 times)
  - Divas Championship Tournament (2010)
  - Ranked No. 37 of the top 50 Greatest WWE Female Superstars of all time (2021)
