= WAGs Boutique =

ITV2 reality television show

- Genre: Reality
- Created by: Off the Radar Productions
- Presented by: June Sarpong
- Country of origin: United Kingdom
- Original language: English
- No. of series: 1
- No. of episodes: 13

Production
- Running time: 60 minutes (inc. adverts)
- Production company: Talkback Thames

Original release
- Network: ITV2
- Release: 30 January – 24 April 2007

WAGs Boutique is a reality television show on ITV2 in which two teams of WAGs (footballers' wives and girlfriends) ran two rival fashion boutiques over a three-month period.

== Format ==
Ten women are split into two teams, both of which run neighbouring boutiques. The contestants have to think of a boutique name, decorate the boutiques themselves and choose every single item of stock. They run the boutiques themselves, with only the occasional word of advice from their mentors. Each week, a manager for each boutique is chosen and a challenge is set. The manager then has to select two contestants to leave the shop and complete the challenge. During the 3 months, the contestants compete for their team's chosen charity; all profit the boutiques made are sent to the charity.

The winning team is the group which obtains the most profit. There was also a winning contestant, who was originally going to get to work with fashion designer Scott Henshall to design her own high street range of fashion, however, the winner of series one, Krystell Sidwell, did not receive this prize, but instead was awarded a column in Reveal Magazine.

The format was devised, and is owned by Nathan Carey a producer based in London, formerly of Off The Radar. The pre-production name of FW Boutique was changed to WAGs Boutique and the show commenced broadcasting on Tuesday, 30 January 2007 and ended on Tuesday, 24 April 2007 on ITV2. Wags Boutique is hosted by the presenter of Channel 4's youth show T4, June Sarpong. The series was co-produced by Soho-based production agency, Off the Radar and Talkback Thames.

The series raised over £500,000 for two charities - Great Ormond Street Hospital and The Willow Foundation.

Over 60,000 viewers visited the shops in just 30 days of trading.

Despite the success of the first series peaking at almost 2m viewers across ITV1 and ITV2, second series plans were scrapped after England failed to qualify for Euro 2008.

== Teams ==
The ten WAGs were split into two teams, picked by each store's Mentor. Both boutiques were located on Marshall Street, London. The teams were as follows:

Teams
Number	Name	Civic number	WAG	Mentor
1	Bows	33	Madeleine Bowden	Anna Park
1	Bows	33	Michaela Henderson-Thynne	Anna Park
1	Bows	33	Julie Phillips	Anna Park
1	Bows	33	Krystell Sidwell	Anna Park
1	Bows	33	Nicola T	Anna Park
2	Better Half	34	Jadene Bircham	Lyn Gardner
2	Better Half	34	Elle Isaac	Lyn Gardner
2	Better Half	34	Charlotte Mears	Lyn Gardner
2	Better Half	34	Cassie Sumner	Lyn Gardner
2	Better Half	34	Heather Swan	Lyn Gardner

== See also ==
- WAGS (TV series)
- WAGS Atlanta
- WAGS Miami
- WAG Nation
