= WAGS Atlanta =

- Genre: Reality television
- Starring: Brandi Rhodes; Hope Wiseman; Kaylin Jurrjens; Kesha Norman; Kierra Douglas; Niche Caldwell; Sincerely Ward; Shuntel "Telli" Swift
- Country of origin: United States
- Original language: English
- No. of seasons: 1
- No. of episodes: 8

Production
- Executive producers: Amber Mazzola; James Dubose; Lynsey Dufour; Paul Yuan
- Production location: Atlanta, Georgia
- Camera setup: Multi-camera
- Running time: 43 minutes
- Production company: Machete Productions

Original release
- Network: E!
- Release: January 3 – February 7, 2018

Related
- WAGS; WAGS Miami

WAGS Atlanta is an American reality television show that premiered on the E! cable network on January 3, 2018, as a spin-off of WAGS. The reality show chronicled the lives of several WAGs (an acronym for "wives and girlfriends" of high-profile athletes) in Atlanta, Georgia. The show was canceled in January 2019.

== Production ==
The series was announced by E! on May 4, 2017. The series is the second spin-off of WAGS. The show is set in Atlanta and will document the personal and professional lives of a group of WAGs. WAGS Atlanta premiered on January 3, 2018.

== Cast ==
- Brandi Rhodes, wife of Cody Rhodes
- Hope Wiseman
- Kaylin Jurrjens, wife of Jair Jurrjens
- Kesha Norman, girlfriend of C. J. Mosley
- Kierra Douglas, wife of Harry Douglas
- Niche Caldwell, wife of Andre Caldwell
- Sincerely Ward, cousin of Derrick Ward
- Shuntel "Telli" Swift, fiance of Deontay Wilder

== Episodes ==
No.	Title	Original release date	U.S. viewers (millions)
1	"Peaches, Prayers and Players"	January 3, 2018	0.33
2	"The Dating Game"	January 10, 2018	0.28
3	"Belle in the Bayou"	January 17, 2018	0.26
4	"The Ultimate Ultimatum"	January 24, 2018	0.26
5	"Peaches in the Big Apple"	January 31, 2018	0.25
6	"Belles Gone Country"	January 31, 2018	0.25
7	"Go Your Own Way"	February 7, 2018	0.17
8	"Rules of Engagement"	February 7, 2018	0.17

== See also ==
- WAGS (TV series)
- WAGs Boutique
- WAGS Miami
- WAG Nation
