= Jarrad Waite =

Australian rules footballer

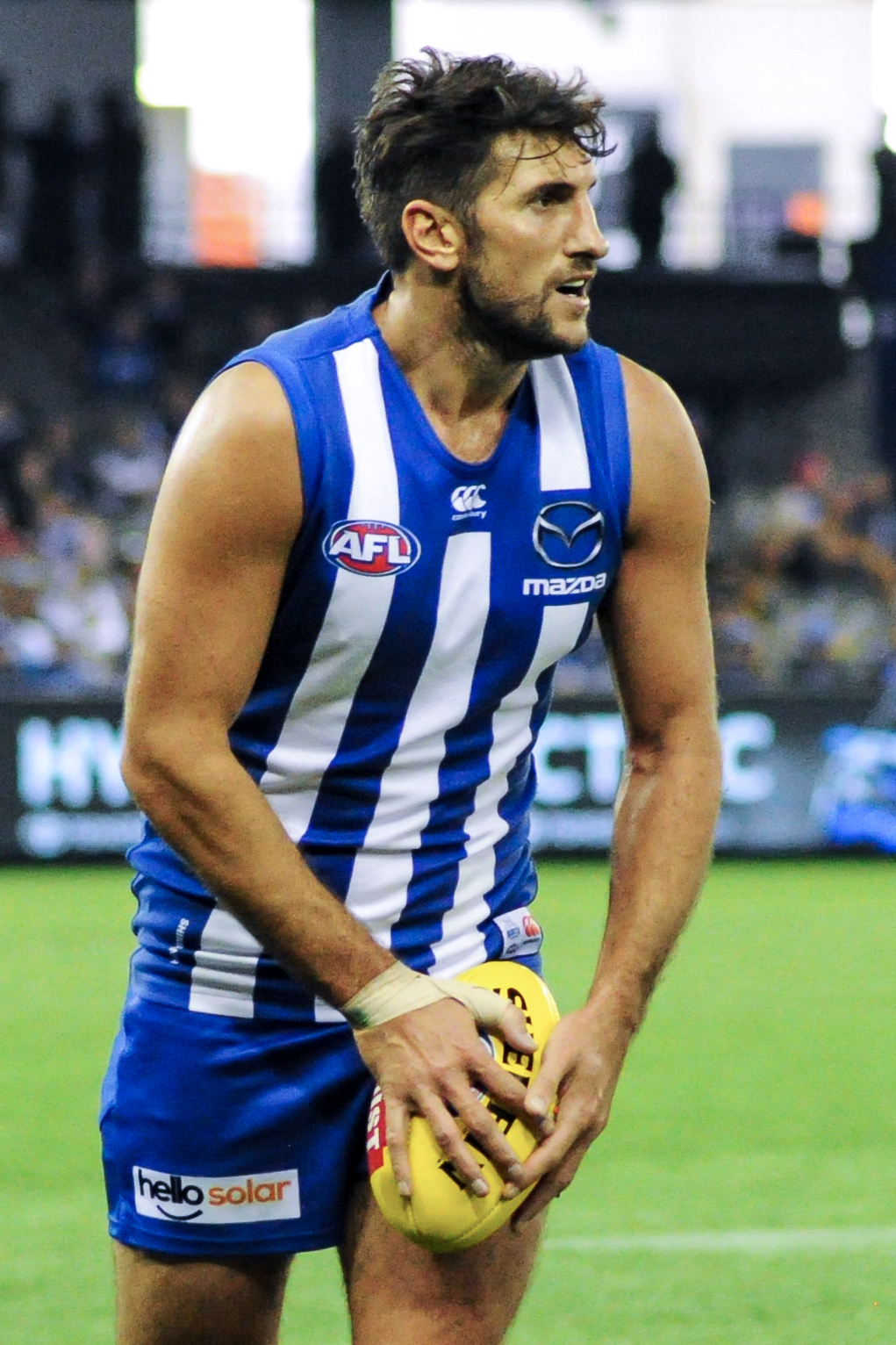
- Waite playing for North Melbourne in April 2018

Personal information
- Full name: Jarrad Waite
- Born: 4 February 1983 (age 43); Devonport, Tasmania
- Original team: Murray Bushrangers (TAC Cup)
- Draft: No. 46 (F/S), 2001 National draft
- Height: 194 cm (6 ft 4 in)
- Weight: 96 kg (212 lb)
- Position: Forward

Playing career^{1}
Years	Club	Games (Goals)
2003–2014	Carlton	184 (252)
2015–2018	North Melbourne	60 (125)
Total		244 (377)

Representative team honours^{2}
Years	Team	Games (Goals)
2008	Victoria	1 (0)

International team honours^{2}
2005	Australia	2 (0)
- ^{1} Playing statistics correct to the end of 2018.^{2} Representative statistics correct as of 2008.

Career highlights
- AFL Rising Star nomination 2003; Carlton leading goalkicker 2014; North Melbourne leading goalkicker 2015

Jarrad Waite (born 4 February 1983) is a former professional Australian rules footballer who played for the Carlton Football Club and North Melbourne Football Club in the Australian Football League (AFL).

== AFL playing career ==
=== Carlton (2003–2014) ===
Born in Devonport, Tasmania, Waite was recruited as the number 46 draft pick in the 2001 AFL draft from Benalla under the father-son selection rule, he is the son of former Carlton player Vin Waite. He made his debut for Carlton in round 1, 2003 against the Sydney Swans.

Waite made his stance in the AFL as a very prominent forward after he kicked 36 goals in the 2005 season, finishing second behind Brendan Fevola for the club.

Waite was shifted from the forward-line into the back-line during the 2007 NAB Cup where he played at centre half-back. However, during the home and away season, he again played predominantly as a forward. In 2008, Waite returned to the back-line under senior coach Brett Ratten.

In 2009, Waite again began to spend time at both ends of the ground. However, in round 9, he suffered a season-ending knee after he partially tore his ACL after hyperextending his left knee when landing on a straight leg. He returned in time for the 2010 season.

In a small part of football history, Waite was the first player ever to be substituted off the ground under the AFL's revised interchange rules in 2011; Waite was concussed in a collision, and was replaced by Kane Lucas in the season's opening match against Richmond. On 12 September 2011, following a round 16 hip injury, Waite was ruled out for the remainder of the 2011 season.

In October 2011, after nine seasons with the club, Waite re-signed with Carlton on a three-year deal. In January 2012, he was elevated to the club's leadership group for the 2012 season.

On 29 September 2014, Waite parted ways with Carlton after 12 seasons with the club, announcing his decision to exercise his free agency rights.

Waite played with Carlton from 2003 until 2014 for a total of 184 games and 252 goals.

=== North Melbourne (2015–2018) ===
On 3 October 2014, Waite signed a two-year deal with the North Melbourne Football Club.

In late August 2018, he announced that he will retire from his playing career at the end of the 2018 season. He played his last game against St Kilda in Round 23, 2018.

Waite played with North Melbourne from 2015 until 2018 for a total of 60 games and 125 goals.

== Statistics ==
Statistics are correct to the end of the 2018 season

Legend
G	Goals	K	Kicks	D	Disposals	T	Tackles
B	Behinds	H	Handballs	M	Marks

Season	Team	No.	Games	Totals							Averages (per game)						
Season	Team	No.	Games	G	B	K	H	D	M	T	G	B	K	H	D	M	T
2003	Carlton	30	20	11	12	151	82	233	52	56	0.6	0.6	7.6	4.1	11.7	2.6	2.8
2004	Carlton	30	9	7	9	43	27	70	26	20	0.8	1.0	4.8	3.0	7.8	2.9	2.2
2005	Carlton	30	21	36	23	185	95	280	119	41	1.7	1.1	8.8	4.5	13.3	5.7	2.0
2006	Carlton	30	13	18	16	126	42	168	86	34	1.4	1.2	9.7	3.2	12.9	6.6	2.6
2007	Carlton	30	22	28	15	206	117	323	111	58	1.3	0.7	9.4	5.3	14.7	5.0	2.6
2008	Carlton	30	21	7	5	256	131	387	138	66	0.3	0.2	12.2	6.2	18.4	6.6	3.1
2009	Carlton	30	9	10	2	132	46	178	66	10	1.1	0.2	14.7	5.1	19.8	7.3	1.1
2010	Carlton	30	16	36	14	173	66	239	111	56	2.3	0.9	10.8	4.1	14.9	6.9	3.5
2011	Carlton	30	12	16	19	116	58	174	83	24	1.3	1.6	9.7	4.8	14.5	6.9	2.0
2012	Carlton	30	11	27	14	116	49	165	84	30	2.5	1.3	10.5	4.5	15.0	7.6	2.7
2013	Carlton	30	14	27	17	127	37	164	84	34	1.9	1.2	9.1	2.6	11.7	6.0	2.4
2014	Carlton	30	16	29	17	169	62	231	101	46	1.8	1.1	10.6	3.9	14.4	6.3	2.9
2015	North Melbourne	30	23	42	24	209	105	314	134	66	1.8	1.0	9.1	4.6	13.7	5.8	2.9
2016	North Melbourne	30	14	29	15	135	79	209	79	56	2.1	1.1	9.6	5.3	14.9	5.6	4.0
2017	North Melbourne	30	10	22	18	96	45	141	49	25	2.2	1.8	9.6	4.5	14.1	4.9	2.5
2018	North Melbourne	30	13	32	18	151	53	204	81	27	2.5	1.4	11.6	4.1	15.7	6.2	2.1
Career			244	377	238	2391	1089	3480	1404	649	1.6	1.0	9.8	4.5	14.3	5.8	2.7

== Personal life ==
In 2011, Waite married long-time girlfriend Jackie Spong, the owner of the Melbourne fashion boutique SISCA. She appeared in the first season of WAG Nation, a reality television series that documents the lives of five wives and girlfriends of Australian sportsmen, for which Waite is a part of the supporting cast.
