= WAG Nation =

- Genre: Reality television
- Created by: Chris Culvenor
- Starring: Terry Biviano; Lynette Bolton; Jackie Spong; Chantelle Raleigh; Jana Peterson
- Country of origin: Australia
- Original language: English
- No. of seasons: 1
- No. of episodes: 10

Production
- Running time: 60 minutes
- Production company: Shine Australia

Original release
- Network: Arena
- Release: 18 April 2012

Related
- WAGS; WAGS Miami; WAGS Atlanta

WAG Nation is an Australian reality series that was aired on Arena, a subscription television channel. The series follows the lives of five women described as "WAGs", wives and girlfriends of Australian sportsmen.

The first season of WAG Nation premiered on 18 April 2012 and consists of 10 episodes. The cast features Terry Biviano, wife of NRL Sydney Roosters player Anthony Minichiello; event planner Lynette Bolton, wife of AFL Sydney Swans player Jude Bolton; promotions manager Jana Peterson, girlfriend of NRL Cronulla Sharks player John Williams; fashion boutique owner Jackie Spong, wife of AFL North Melbourne player Jarrad Waite; and model/flight attendant Chantelle Raleigh, girlfriend of NBL Gold Coast Blaze player Adam Gibson.

== Cast ==
Cast member	Season(s)	Notes
THE WAGS
Terry Biviano	1	Married to Sydney Roosters player Anthony Minichiello, Terry is one of Australia's leading footwear designers, commanding over a thousand dollars for a single pair of shoes. Living in Sydney's celebrity suburb of Bondi Beach, Terry is a regular fixture on the A-list circuit and knows everyone who is anyone.
Jackie Spong	1	Married to Carlton Blues player Jarrad Waite, Jackie owns her own fashion boutique in Melbourne's Camberwell. Having been with Jarrad for over four years, Jackie has been on the Melbourne WAG scene for a long time.
Jana Peterson	1	Long-term girlfriend of Cronulla Sharks player John Williams, Jana is a former model turned promotions manager at a weekly magazine. She only recently moved to Sydney from her hometown of Townsville, so is new to the Sydney WAG scene and is trying to establish herself in the complex hierarchy of sporting partners.
Chantelle Raleigh	1	Girlfriend of Gold Coast Blaze captain Adam Gibson, Chantelle is a model and television presenter. Living in Melbourne, she is in a long distance relationship with Adam which is causing a few problems.
Lynette Bolton	1	Married to Sydney Swans player Jude Bolton, Lynette is a freelance wedding and event producer who is in the process of launching her own events company. Born and bred in Sydney, Lynette and fellow WAG Terry Biviano often mix in the same social circles.

== Reception ==
The series was criticised for using the term "WAG", although the intention of the show - to focus more on the complexities of the subjects lives than their appearance - was regarded as a strong positive. Commentator Brad Newsome criticised the show as being dull. In describing the first episode, Newsome wrote "You might have imagined that the lives of Australian WAGs (wives and girlfriends of sportsmen) would be terribly exciting. And perhaps they are, but it doesn't seem so in the first episode of this new series.".

== See also ==
- The Shire
- Freshwater Blue
- Stafford Brothers
