= Larry English =

American football player (born 1986)

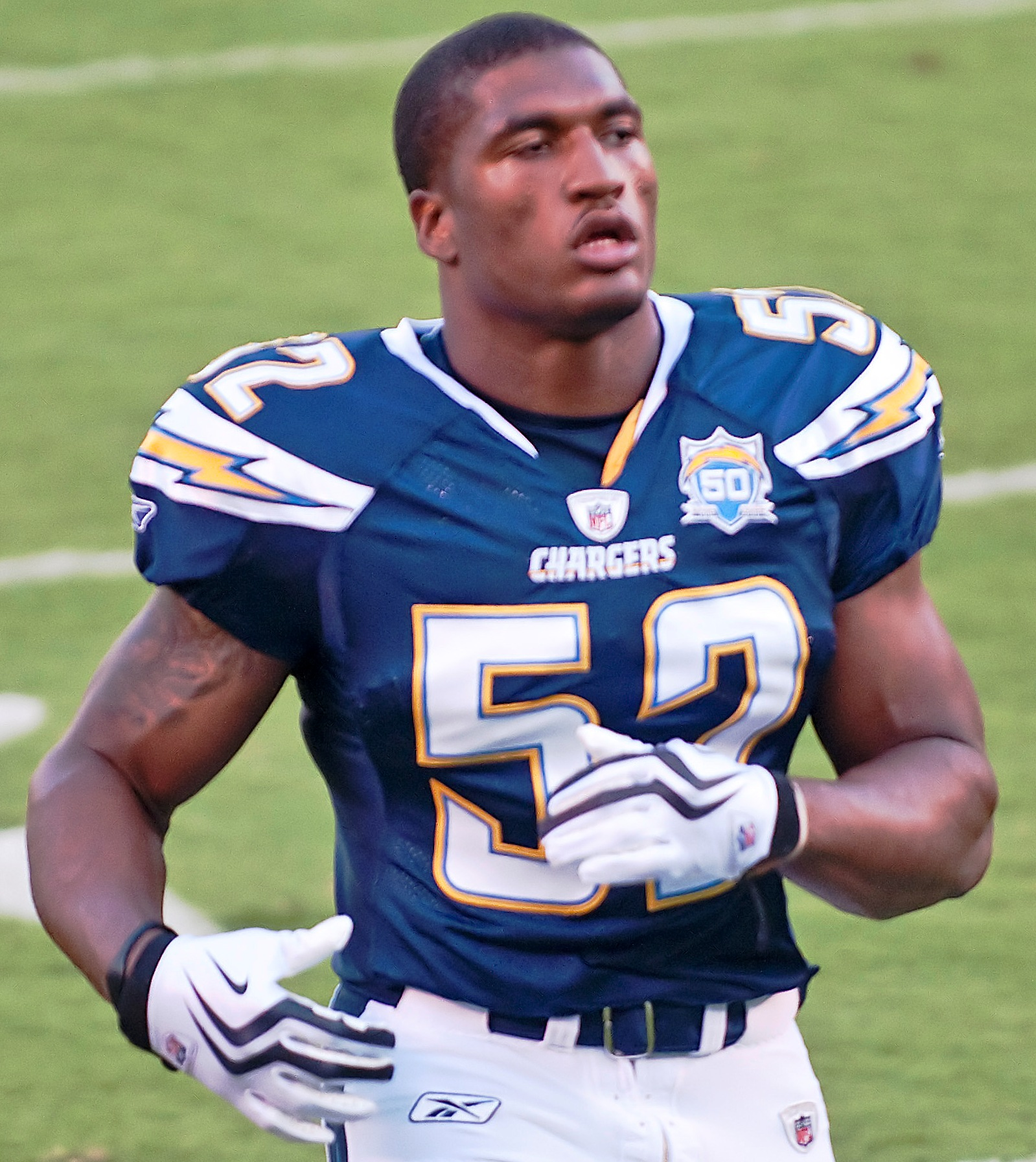
- English with the San Diego Chargers in 2009

No. 52, 51, 57
- Positions: Defensive end, linebacker

Personal information
- Born: January 22, 1986 (age 40); Aurora, Illinois, U.S.
- Listed height: 6 ft 2 in (1.88 m)
- Listed weight: 255 lb (116 kg)

Career information
- High school: Marmion Academy (Aurora)
- College: Northern Illinois (2004–2008)
- NFL draft: 2009: 1st round, 16th overall pick

Career history
- San Diego Chargers (2009–2013); Tampa Bay Buccaneers (2014–2015)

Awards and highlights
- 3× All-MAC (2006–2008); 2× MAC Most Valuable Player (2007, 2008); MAC Defensive Player of the Year (2008)

Career NFL statistics
- Total tackles: 103
- Sacks: 12
- Forced fumbles: 2
- Fumble recoveries: 2
- Stats at Pro Football Reference

Larry Eugene English Jr. (born January 22, 1986) is an American former professional football player who was a defensive end and a linebacker in the National Football League (NFL). He played college football as a linebacker for the Northern Illinois Huskies and was selected by the San Diego Chargers in the first round of the 2009 NFL draft. He also played for the Tampa Bay Buccaneers.

== Early life ==
At Marmion Academy, in Aurora, Illinois, English was named team co-captain, MVP, and First-team All-Suburban Catholic Conference both as a junior and senior. He made 98 tackles and six sacks while playing inside linebacker and as a running back he rushed for 312 yards on 38 carries (8.2 avg). As a junior, he had 100 tackles, and added two interceptions and two fumble recoveries during junior campaign. English lettered in football, basketball and track.

== College career ==
English was a medical redshirt in 2004 after playing in the first game of the season and sustaining an injury. The following season, 2005, he played 11 games, starting nine. He had 78 tackles with seven of them being for a loss. The next season, 2006, he was a First-team All-MAC selection. Started all 13 games and tied school record with 12 sacks, while totaling 51 tackles and forcing four fumbles.

In 2007, English was the Mid-American Conference's MVP and was a consensus choice First-team All-MAC and a Fourth-team All-American by Phil Steele as he recorded 17 tackles for loss–which ranked 18th in the NCAA. Also in 2007 English had 10.5 sacks which led the conference. English also deflected two passes. As a senior (2008 Season) English again won the Vern Smith Award, given to the MAC's top player. Additionally, English was named the MAC Defensive Player of the Year by the MAC News Media Association as well as Sporting News. He led the Huskies with eight sacks and 14.5 tackles for loss and he was an All-MAC choice for the third consecutive season.

=== College statistics ===
Year	Team	GP	GS	UA	AT	TT	T/L	Sacks	FF	FR	PD	INT
2004	NIU	1	0	3	0	3	0	0	0	0	0	0
2005	NIU	11	9	25	43	78	7	1	0	1	0	0
2006	NIU	13	13	32	19	51	16	12	4	1	0	0
2007	NIU	12	12	29	38	67	17	10.5	1	1	2	0
2008	NIU	13	13	26	11	37	14.5	8	3	0	1	0
Totals		50	47	125	112	237	54.5	31.5	8	3	3	0

Key: GP - games played; GS - games started; UA - unassisted tackles; AT - assisted tackles; TT - total tackles; T/L - tackles for a loss; Sacks -; FF – Forced fumble; FR – Fumbles recovered; PD - passes deflected; Int - interceptions

== Professional career ==
=== Pre-draft ===
Pre-draft measurables
Height	Weight	40-yard dash	10-yard split	20-yard split	20-yard shuttle	Three-cone drill	Vertical jump	Broad jump	Bench press	Wonderlic
6 ft 2 1/8 in (1.88 m)	255 lb (116 kg)	4.64 s	1.59 s	2.70 s	4.38 s	7.26 s	36 in (0.91 m)	9 ft 7 in (2.92 m)	24 reps	34
40-yd dash (and splits) and broad jump from Northern Illinois Pro Day. All others from NFL Combine.

English scored a 34 on the aptitude assessment Wonderlic Test at the 2009 NFL Draft Combine, one of the highest scores ever recorded for his position, outside linebacker, and the 9th highest score of the 2009 NFL Draft Class. With comparison to IQ, a Wonderlic Score of 34 suggests English has an IQ of 128, twenty-eight points above average. Picked 16th overall in the 2009 NFL Draft, English is the highest drafted player out of Northern Illinois.

=== San Diego Chargers ===
English was selected by the Chargers first round, 16th overall, in the 2009 NFL draft. English was a defensive end in college, however, the Chargers indicated he will be an outside linebacker in the NFL."The more I learned about the 3-4 scheme and my abilities, the type of football player I am ... I think I will fit perfectly in it," said English. English had 23 tackles as a rookie, but suffered a foot fracture in the 2010 training camp and started just four games in total going into the 2013 season for the Chargers. English continued to struggle with injuries and poor play, missing 21 games and accumulating just 6 combined sacks between 2011 and 2013. He was released by the Chargers on July 22, 2014.

=== Tampa Bay Buccaneers ===
English was signed by the Tampa Bay Buccaneers on August 14, 2014, He was cut by the team on August 29 and later re-signed again on September 9, 2014.

=== NFL statistics ===
Year	Team	GP	COMB	TOTAL	AST	SACK	FF	FR	FR YDS	INT	IR YDS	AVG IR	LNG	TD	PD
2009	SD	16	36	26	10	2.0	1	1	0	0	0	0	0	0	1
2010	SD	8	17	12	5	3.0	0	0	0	0	0	0	0	0	0
2011	SD	5	7	5	2	2.0	0	0	0	0	0	0	0	0	0
2012	SD	14	13	7	6	1.5	0	1	0	0	0	0	0	0	0
2013	SD	9	18	12	6	2.5	0	0	0	0	0	0	0	0	1
2014	TB	12	12	7	5	1.0	1	0	0	0	0	0	0	0	0
Career		64	103	69	34	12.0	2	2	0	0	0	0	0	0	2

== Personal life ==
English served as the honorary chairman of the American Lung Association inaugural Fight For Air Climb in San Diego on February 27, 2011. English, who has struggled with asthma since he was a child, stated: "As an individual living with asthma, I truly understand the challenges this disease presents."

On May 19, 2017, English married model Nicole Williams, with whom he appeared on WAGS, a reality series about the romantic partners of athletes. In July 2022 the couple announced they were expecting their first child, and later welcomed a daughter, India Moon English.

English plays a cameo role in the 2017 video game Madden NFL 18's "Longshot" story mode.
