= WAGs =

Slang meaning "wives and girlfriends"

WAGs (or Wags) is an acronym used to refer to wives and girlfriends of high-profile sportsmen and women. The term may also be used in the singular form, WAG, to refer to a specific female partner or life partner who is in a relationship with an athlete. The term was first used by the British tabloid press to refer to the wives and girlfriends of high-profile footballers, originally the England national football team. The WAGs acronym came about following an increasing focus on the coverage of athletes' partners in the late-20th century, and it came into common use during the 2006 FIFA World Cup to refer to Victoria Beckham and Cheryl Cole, although the term had been used occasionally before that.

After achieving popularity, the acronym became a focus of reality television shows such as WAGs Boutique, WAG Nation, and WAGS. It has since been used by some media in other countries to describe the female partners of athletes in general. Variations have also been developed for other relations, such as husbands and boyfriends, and for other celebrities, such as the wives and girlfriends of celebrities and world leaders. The WAGs acronym is sometimes interpreted as demeaning to women, and it has been criticised by the partners of many athletes as well as by groups such as the Equality and Human Rights Commission.

== Lexicography ==
It is a popular belief that the first recorded use of the term WAG was in 2002: "It was never guaranteed that the wives and girlfriends (or "the Wags", as staff at the Jumeirah Beach Club call them for short) would get along. Mrs Beckham's tongue, for one thing, has previously run away with itself." Jennifer Bullen has also suggested that the 1991 novel Polo by Jilly Cooper was the first place where the term was published.

In 2006 it was generally printed as "WAGs", but a singular, "Wag" or "WAG", quickly came into vogue; for example: "any additional pounds she gained during Wag drinking sessions"; "a property heiress, model and actress, appears a likely sports WAG". Susie Dent's annual Language Report for the Oxford University Press (2006) capitalised the entire acronym as "WAG" ("wife and/or girlfriend") .

"WAG"/"wag" came also to be used somewhat redundantly ("deluxe-edition Wag girlfriend"), although in such usage "girlfriend" (or "wife") could be interpreted as further denotative specification within the set of people fitting both the denotation and the connotation of "WAG", and increasingly in non-footballing contexts: for example, the first wife of comedian Peter Cook (1937–95) was described as a "Sixties Wag" and actress Jennifer Ellison, because of her former choice of clothes, "once ... the epitome of a Wag". Fashion writer Shane Watson coined a collective noun, "waggery".

== Criticism ==
In 2010, the Equalities and Human Rights Commission (EHRC) criticised the term as sexist and stated that it could be offensive, as it was often used to demean women. Other commentators have reflected this view. Felicity Morse has argued that "referring to any woman pejoratively as a 'wife or girlfriend' is not acceptable, and that the "casual repetition of this chauvinist term has normalised it". Dana Johannsen described the term as "the most odious acronym in sport", while Melanie Dinjaski argued that it demeans women and "implies a link between women and dogs, happily wagging their tails at their owner's (player's) side". In examining the use of the term WAG, Shawna Marks concluded that its use in the Australian media "highlight[s] sexist norms that persist within Australian football culture", and that this extended to other groups, such as women fans and players.

Some of those described by the media as WAGs have argued against the use of the term. Rebekah Vardy reportedly stated that "Wag is a dated term because we're not defined by what our husbands do. We're individuals", Others, such as Girls Aloud member Cheryl Cole, have similarly rejected the eponym and to emphasise their credentials as career women in their own right.

There are many celebrities who have been described as WAGs after either marrying or dating a notable athlete. Some independently famous women described in this manner include La La Anthony, Victoria Beckham, Gisele Bündchen, Cheryl Cole, Ciara, Ayesha Curry, Hilary Duff, Kendall Jenner, Khloé Kardashian, Irina Shayk, Taylor Swift, Carrie Underwood, and Gabrielle Union.

The singer Jamelia (whose footballer boyfriend, Darren Byfield, played for Jamaica) drew a distinction between, on the one hand, those such as Victoria Beckham, who are "businesswoman", and Cole and Rooney, who "have a job" and those who, in her view, had the wrong "priorities" and simply spent their boyfriends' money.

== Other sports ==
=== Lawn tennis ===
During the course of the World Cup, the Times coined the term "WWAGs" ("Wimbledon Wives and Girlfriends") for the girlfriends of male participants in the All-England Lawn Tennis Championships in 2006. The most photographed partner in the British press during the tournament of 2006 was Kim Sears, the girlfriend of Scottish player Andy Murray. Sears is the daughter of Nigel Sears, former coach of the Slovak player Daniela Hantuchová.

=== Golf ===
The term "wives and girlfriends" (in unabbreviated term) was commonly used during the Ryder Cup golfing competitions at The Belfry in 2002 and Oakland Hills near Detroit in 2004, the press having given these partners about as much coverage as the golfers themselves. London Lite and Metro used the y patronising acronym "WABs" ("wives and birdies", the latter a pun on the term for a one under par score for a hole) with reference to the partners of the European team as they arrived in Ireland for the 2006 Ryder Cup at The K Club, Straffan, County Kildare.

=== Cricket ===
"CWAGs" (Cricket Wives and Girlfriends) was applied to partners of the England cricket team in the series of Test matches against Australia that began in Brisbane in November 2006: for example, "Jessica the Cwag knocks Ashes Test crowd for six" (the subject of this headline being singer Jessica Taylor, of the group Liberty X, fiancée of batsman Kevin Pietersen). "WAG" had previously been applied in the context of cricket: for example to model Minki van der Westhuizen, who had been associated with the South African captain, Graeme Smith.

England cricketer Danni Wyatt has long been nicknamed "Waggy". As she explained in 2015, "The girls say I'm a wannabe WAG because I've dated two footballers!"

Anushka Sharma, a leading Bollywood actress, is famously known as the wife of Indian cricket superstar Virat Kohli. Their relationship began in 2013 during a commercial shoot, and they got married in a private ceremony in Italy in December 2017. Together, they are considered one of India’s most iconic celebrity couples. Anushka is often seen supporting Virat at matches, and their public association has made her one of the most recognized WAGs (Wives and Girlfriends) in the cricketing world. They have two children: daughter Vamika and son Akaay.

=== British Royal Family ===
In July 2006 The Sun carried an article on the "RAGs" ("Royals and Girlfriends"), a term introduced for young female members of the British Royal Family, as well as Catherine Middleton, then girlfriend and now wife of Prince William, and Chelsy Davy, then girlfriend of Prince Harry. Subsequently, under the heading "Windsor Mads outdo the Wags", Jasper Gerard reported in the Sunday Times on festivities involving "the Windsor Mads (mothers and daughters), as Fergie [Sarah, Duchess of York] and Eugenie celebrated Beatrice's forthcoming 18th birthday".

=== Motor racing ===
Though the term has not typically been associated with motor racing, many high-profile sportsmen in motor racing have publicly enjoyed high-profile relationships with celebrities, for instance Jacques Villeneuve's relationship with Dannii Minogue, Lewis Hamilton's 8 year on-off relationship with Nicole Scherzinger and the former marriage of Dario Franchitti and Ashley Judd.

One example of a well known wife of a sportsman is Michaela Fogarty, the wife of former Superbike World Championship star Carl. At the height of her husband's fame, she has been photographed in pit and paddock areas and has also appeared in print advertisements for Ducati motorcycles, which her husband has ridden for. Despite never appearing in the spotlight, much of her popularity is within the motorcycling fraternity, as she is known for her support of her husband. The two have even appeared in a series which they embark on an adventure riding.

A famous fictional example is the character of Carley Bobby (Leslie Bibb) in the 2006 film Talladega Nights: The Ballad of Ricky Bobby. In the film, Carley is shown to be dependent on the success of her husband Ricky (Will Ferrell). After Ricky is injured in what appears to be a career-ending crash, Carley divorces him and subsequently marries Ricky's teammate Cal Naughton Jr. (John C. Reilly); Carley explains her decision by remarking, "I am a driver's wife! I don't work!"

=== Rugby League ===
Many partners of Rugby league players have been associated with the WAGs term by the media. Examples include Terry Biviano, Candice Falzon and Lauryn Eagle.

=== Rugby Union ===
Many partners of Rugby Union players have been associated with the WAGs term by the media.

New Zealand field hockey player Honor Dillon has been called a WAG since her marriage to out-half Dan Carter. Irish model Holly Carpenter also has the WAG title from the press due to being the girlfriend of Cian Healy.

=== Shinty ===
The traditional Scottish sport of shinty has developed the terminology "SWAGs" to refer to the wives and partners of shinty players. The terms was given further credence by an hour long documentary on BBC Alba, following various partners throughout a shinty season. Some of the "SWAGs" featured in the programme have been given further prominence in print and at shinty events.

=== Other acronyms ===
Other imitative acronyms to emerge in 2006 included:

Acronyms	Description
CHAPs	"celebrities' husbands and partners";
HABs	"husbands and boyfriends" for the partners of female tennis players at Wimbledon (and other female athletes);
MAGs	"mothers and girlfriends", or the singular "MAG" for mother of a WAG (e.g. "Wonder who's paying for Coleen's MAG's shopping?")
SADs	"sons and daughters" of footballers, a term used by the Sunday Times with reference to Bianca Gascoigne, daughter of Paul Gascoigne who played for England in the 1990 World Cup, Shaun Wright-Phillips, the adopted son of Ian Wright (Arsenal and England) and Calum Best, son of George Best (Manchester United & Northern Ireland);
SWAGs	used both for "supporters without a game" (e.g. England fans at a loose end in Germany on days when their team was not playing) and, according to the Guardian, "Summit wives and girlfriends" (the partners of World leaders attending the G8 Summit in St Petersburg, Russia on 15–17 July 2006).

== Coverage of women and girlfriends in sports ==
Interest in the partners of footballers dates back at least to the late 1950s when the long-serving England captain Billy Wright married the singer Joy Beverley. By the late 1960s, then-captain Bobby Moore (1941–93) and his first wife Tina had become regarded as a stylish and "golden" couple. During the 1970 World Cup in Mexico the England manager Sir Alf Ramsey (1920–99) expressed concern at the effects on the team's cohesion of the presence of the wives of four players, a view that seems to have been shared by some other members of the squad. England's quarter-final defeat by West Germany in that competition has been widely attributed to goalkeeping lapses by Peter Bonetti, whose pre-match nerves were thought by many, including Ramsey himself, to have been accentuated by rumours circulating about the alleged behaviour of his wife Frances. By contrast, during the 1966 World Cup, their wives drove themselves to Wembley and the FA booked them a single function room in the Royal Garden Hotel at Kensington.

Interest in such partnerships scaled new heights in the late 1990s and early 21st century with the marriage (in 1999) of David Beckham to singer Victoria Adams ("Posh Spice") of the Spice Girls. The couple were widely known as "Posh and Becks" and many aspects of their relationship and nuance of dress were subjected to scrutiny in the press and other media, particularly tabloid-type media. Victoria Beckham was quoted as saying that she and her husband had "so many wider interests ... fashion, make-up. I mean you think, yeah, football's great, and singing's great. But you've got to look at the bigger picture".

Former Manchester United captain Roy Keane had lashed out at footballers' wives and girlfriends, as well as their lavish lifestyle, during their trophyless season in 2001–2002. Keane blamed United's loss of form on some of his teammates' fixation with wealth, claiming that they had "forgot about the game, lost the hunger that got you the Rolex, the cars, the mansion." Earlier in the season, Keane had publicly advocated the break-up of the Treble-winning team as he believed the teammates who had played in United's victorious 1999 Champions League final no longer had the motivation to work as hard. When Keane became manager of Sunderland A.F.C, he complained about the difficulty signing players to the city in northeast England, as their wives or girlfriends insisted they only move to teams based in London. He remarked "If someone doesn't want to come to Sunderland then all well and good," Keane said. "But if they don't want to come to Sunderland because their wife wants to go shopping in London, then it is a sad state of affairs. Unfortunately that is what is influencing a lot of footballers' decisions. Priorities have changed for footballers and they are being dictated to by their wives and girlfriends."

=== 2006 World Cup ===
During the 2006 World Cup the press gave increasing coverage to the socialising and shopping activities of the wives and girlfriends of English footballers based in the German town of Baden-Baden. Their activities led to frequent suggestions that they contributed to England's exit from the tournament in the quarterfinals. "It was a circus", Rio Ferdinand claimed, alleging that distraction caused by the women in Baden-Baden badly hampered England's 2006 World Cup finals campaign.

Prominent women at Baden-Baden included Victoria Beckham, wife of then England captain David Beckham, whom the New Yorker described as "Queen of the Wags" and the Sunday Times as "the original Wag"; Cheryl, née Tweedy, of the group Girls Aloud, who shortly afterwards married Ashley Cole ("Wag weds"), from whom she was divorced in 2010; Coleen Rooney, née Mcloughlin, who married Wayne Rooney in June 2008 and who was variously described as a "chavette" and, by the end of the year, listed by the Times as a "national treasure"; and fitness instructor Carly Cole née Zucker, wife of Joe Cole, described by Susie Whally in the Sunday Times as a "new WAG on the block [who] has set the tone for the season's most wanted muscles". Other women that aroused considerable interest included Melanie Slade, due to her relative youth – she was an A-level student at the time – girlfriend of Theo Walcott, who, at seventeen, was himself the youngest member of the England squad; Abbey Clancy, girlfriend of Peter Crouch; Steven Gerrard's fiancé Alex Curran, a model frequently featured in tabloids and fashion magazines; and Spanish former waitress Elen Rives, the then-fiancée of Frank Lampard.

Nancy Dell'Olio, an Italian property lawyer who was the girlfriend of the then England coach Sven-Göran Eriksson, enjoyed quite a high public profile of her own, partly as a result of long-running British press interest in aspects of Eriksson's private life.

In an October 2008 press conference, England and Manchester United footballer Rio Ferdinand heavily criticised the focus on the partners of sporting stars, particularly in Baden-Baden two years previously, calling it a "circus" and giving praise to new England manager Fabio Capello's more disciplined regime, and after England had qualified for the 2010 World Cup by beating Croatia 5–1, Capello made his first public comment on the WAGs by making it clear that the England players will only be able to see their wives and partners the day after a match, stating that "We are there to play, not for a holiday". As it happened, the England team were knocked out of that tournament at an even earlier stage.

=== Footballers' Wives ===
Footballers' Wives, 2002 (DVD of ITV drama series)

During the peak era of the tabloid coverage of the wives and girlfriends of sports figures, the lifestyle of Victoria Beckham influenced the ITV drama series Footballers' Wives (2002) and in particular the character of Chardonnay Lane-Pascoe (played by Susie Amy). The term "footballer's wife" came to be associated with a spouse leading a "high" life of socialising and shopping. Alf Ramsey, who thought the role of a footballer's wife essentially that of a housewife, had once observed that he "didn't know much about women and the only women I know are footballers' wives". However, as his biographer noted, this remark was made "at a time when the phrase 'footballers' wives' had yet to become the embodiment of predatory lust."

Broadly speaking "Footballer's wife" and "WAG" were synonymous, but the latter was more generic, while the former connoted someone who seemed particularly pampered, perhaps with some of the characteristics also of an "Essex girl".

During the 2005–6 season the actress Joanna Taylor, wife of Fulham midfielder Danny Murphy, wrote a regular column for the Times whose title, "Footballer's Wife", was no doubt partially ironic.

=== Fashion ===
The wardrobe for many WAGs have often consisted of hyper-visible displays of wealth, with designer accessories like the Hermès Birkin bag, Miu Miu bucket hats, Chanel earmuffs, and the Dior Saddle bag, considered staple items of the look.

Tabloid fashion writers of 2006 identified certain consequences of what Lisa Armstrong described as "WAG fall-out" and Tina Gaudoin as "Waglash". These were mostly the implications of "over-exposure" of certain styles: for example, that the Hermès Birkin bag had become less desirable as a result of being de rigueur among the women in Baden-Baden (a development dubbed by Shane Watson as "baglash"); or that reaction to the excessively coiffed hair and "vacant perfection" had perhaps been the "tipping point" for a revival of fashions of the 1980s, commended by Armstrong as "the last era of anti-slick".

Armstrong also assured readers who wished to perfect the elements of "beach chic" that the use of denture cleaner to whiten the tips of nails would not make them "look like a WAG", while her colleague Sarah Vine offered advice on "buying some nice perfume that won't make you smell like a WAG on heat". When it was reported, in 2007, that Coleen Rooney would be launching a range of beauty products, London Lite coined the term, "eau de wag" and asked, "who, tell us, who really wants to smell like Coleen McLoughlin?"

However, some women did aspire to the "WAG" look. Mrs. Rooney noted that "apparently more and more women are getting into debt because they try to shop and party like a footballer's wife. If I heard of anyone doing that, I'd tell them to get a grip". Sunday Times columnist India Knight observed, while waiting in an airport queue, that "it's as if a low-level wannabe footballer's wife vibe that is neither aesthetically pleasing nor edifying has become the norm ... I saw this phenomenon en masse". Among other features, Knight identified "enough pink glitter to satisfy the girliest of five-year-olds", massive handbags and huge designer sunglasses.

Reflecting on sunglasses as an accessory, Sunday Times Style's senior fashion writer Colin McDowell suggested that, whereas women had been sure that the poise of Jacqueline Kennedy (1929–94) and Audrey Hepburn (1929–93), style icons of the mid-20th century, had been due to their shading their eyes, "Wags ... far from using dark glasses to encourage others to leave them alone, treat them as a weapon to attract and excite the paparazzi".

== In popular culture ==
In the Estelle song "American Boy", Kanye West raps the lyrics; "But I still talk that ca-a-sh, Cuz a lotta WAGs wanna hear it". Two novels have been published using the terminology. The first, A Wag's Diary, was released in October 2007, published by Harper Collins; the second, A Wag's Diary in LA, was published in June 2008. Both books are written by Alison Kervin.

=== Reality television ===
In January 2007 a reality television series called WAGs Boutique (ITV2) was launched. This featured two teams of WAGs (few of whom had been among the party in Baden Baden the previous year) who competed to run fashion boutiques over a period of three months. The separation of one of the contenders, Michaela Henderson-Thynne, from her erstwhile partner, Middlesbrough midfielder Stewart Downing, raised some issues of principle and terminology. Giles Smith in the Times enquired whether "one can still be registered as a WAG after one has separated from one's footballer?" Smith noted also that a former beauty queen and controversial Celebrity Big Brother contestant, Danielle Lloyd, whose relationship with West Ham United's Teddy Sheringham was "less than concrete", was referred to, during a guest appearance on WAGs Boutique, as "an on-off WAG". Smith wondered whether, in those moments when a woman was an "off-WAG", she was really a WAG at all. London Lite referred to Henderson-Thynne and Cassie Sumner, a WAGs Boutique participant whose supposed relationship with Michael Essien was the subject of some doubt, as "fake WAGs".

As if to emphasise the perceptive opinion of former England full-back Jimmy Armfield that there was "a real international flavour to this World Cup", the Sunday Times published during the 2006 tournament a photograph of the wives of French players Thierry Henry and David Trezeguet with the caption "French Wags Nicole Henry and Beatrice Trezeguet share a smacker [i.e. kiss]". For its part, the French press referred to the English wives and girlfriends ("les épouses et petites amies des joueurs") as "les Wags": "Et lorsque les Wags ont fini leur shopping ..." [And when the Wags had finished their shopping]. Similarly, in German, "die WAGs" was adopted. Austria's Seitenblicke, for example, carried a story "Ich bin keine WAG!" in German about Cheryl Cole's apparent disclaiming of the appellation of "WAG": "Ich war bei 'Girls Aloud' bevor ich Ashley [Cole] kennenlernte ..." [I was with Girls Aloud before I met Ashley].

A 2012 Australian reality television series titled WAG Nation aired on Arena. A 2015 American reality television series titled WAGS aired on the E! network, featuring both the professional and personal lives of several women. Two spin-off series, WAGS Miami and WAGS Atlanta, were also produced, focusing on women in Miami and Atlanta, respectively. VH1's Basketball Wives and its various spin-offs have also featured the concept, instead involving the significant others of professional basketball players.

== See also ==
- Trophy wife
- Wagatha Christie, popular name of a 2022 English court case involving two WAGs
