= List of The New York Times number-one books of 2008 =

The American daily newspaper The New York Times publishes multiple weekly lists ranking the best selling books in the United States. The lists are split into three genres—fiction, nonfiction and children's books. Both the fiction and nonfiction lists are further split into multiple lists.

== Fiction ==
The following list ranks the number-one best selling fiction books, in the hardcover fiction category.

The most popular books of the year were The Appeal, by John Grisham and Change of Heart, by Jodi Picoult with respectively 5 and 3 weeks at the top. The author James Patterson was at the top for four different books (Double Cross, Sundays at Tiffany's, Sail and Cross Country).

| Date | Book | Author |
|---|---|---|
| January 6 | Double Cross | James Patterson |
| January 13 | A Thousand Splendid Suns | Khaled Hosseini |
| January 20 | A Thousand Splendid Suns | Khaled Hosseini |
| January 27 | Plum Lucky | Janet Evanovich |
| February 3 | Plum Lucky | Janet Evanovich |
| February 10 | Duma Key | Stephen King |
| February 17 | The Appeal | John Grisham |
| February 24 | The Appeal | John Grisham |
| March 2 | The Appeal | John Grisham |
| March 9 | The Appeal | John Grisham |
| March 16 | The Appeal | John Grisham |
| March 23 | Change of Heart | Jodi Picoult |
| March 30 | Change of Heart | Jodi Picoult |
| April 6 | Change of Heart | Jodi Picoult |
| April 13 | Compulsion | Jonathan Kellerman |
| April 20 | Unaccustomed Earth | Jhumpa Lahiri |
| April 27 | Where Are You Now? | Mary Higgins Clark |
| May 4 | Hold Tight | Harlan Coben |
| May 11 | The Whole Truth | David Baldacci |
| May 18 | Sundays at Tiffany's | James Patterson and Gabrielle Charbonnet |
| May 25 | The Host | Stephenie Meyer |
| June 1 | The Host | Stephenie Meyer |
| June 8 | Odd Hours | Dean Koontz |
| June 15 | Blood Noir | Laurell K. Hamilton |
| June 22 | Nothing to Lose | Lee Child |
| June 29 | Sail | James Patterson and Howard Roughan |
| July 6 | Fearless Fourteen | Janet Evanovich |
| July 13 | Fearless Fourteen | Janet Evanovich |
| July 20 | The Last Patriot | Brad Thor |
| July 27 | Tribute | Nora Roberts |
| August 3 | Tribute | Nora Roberts |
| August 10 | Moscow Rules | Daniel Silva |
| August 17 | Moscow Rules | Daniel Silva |
| August 24 | Acheron | Sherrilyn Kenyon |
| August 31 | Smoke Screen | Sandra Brown |
| September 7 | The Force Unleashed | Sean Williams |
| September 14 | Devil Bones | Kathy Reichs |
| September 21 | Dark Curse | Christine Feehan |
| September 28 | Anathem | Neal Stephenson |
| October 5 | The Story of Edgar Sawtelle | David Wroblewski |
| October 12 | The Story of Edgar Sawtelle | David Wroblewski |
| October 19 | The Lucky One | Nicholas Sparks |
| October 26 | The Lucky One | Nicholas Sparks |
| November 2 | The Brass Verdict | Michael Connelly |
| November 9 | Extreme Measures | Vince Flynn |
| November 16 | The Gate House | Nelson DeMille |
| November 23 | Divine Justice | David Baldacci |
| November 30 | The Christmas Sweater | Glenn Beck |
| December 7 | Cross Country | James Patterson |
| December 14 | Cross Country | James Patterson |
| December 21 | Scarpetta | Patricia Cornwell |
| December 28 | Scarpetta | Patricia Cornwell |

== Nonfiction ==
The following list ranks the number-one best selling nonfiction books, in the hardcover nonfiction category.

| Date | Book | Author | Publisher |
|---|---|---|---|
| January 6 | I Am America (And So Can You!) | Stephen Colbert | Grand Central |
| January 13 | I Am America (And So Can You!) | Stephen Colbert | Grand Central |
| January 20 | In Defense of Food | Michael Pollan | Penguin Press |
| January 27 | In Defense of Food | Michael Pollan | Penguin Press |
| February 3 | Tom Cruise: An Unauthorized Biography | Andrew Morton | St. Martin's |
| February 10 | In Defense of Food | Michael Pollan | Penguin Press |
| February 17 | In Defense of Food | Michael Pollan | Penguin Press |
| February 24 | In Defense of Food | Michael Pollan | Penguin Press |
| March 2 | In Defense of Food | Michael Pollan | Penguin Press |
| March 9 | Liberal Fascism | Jonah Goldberg | Doubleday |
| March 16 | Losing It | Valerie Bertinelli | Free Press |
| March 23 | Losing It | Valerie Bertinelli | Free Press |
| March 30 | Losing It | Valerie Bertinelli | Free Press |
| April 6 | Beautiful Boy | David Sheff | Houghton Mifflin |
| April 13 | Mistaken Identity | Don and Susie Van Ryn and Newell, Colleen and Whitney Cerak, with Mark Tabb | Howard |
| April 20 | Mistaken Identity | Don and Susie Van Ryn and Newell, Colleen and Whitney Cerak, with Mark Tabb | Howard |
| April 27 | Home | Julie Andrews | Hyperion |
| May 4 | Beautiful Boy | David Sheff | Houghton Mifflin |
| May 11 | Are You There, Vodka? It's Me, Chelsea | Chelsea Handler | Simon Spotlight |
| May 18 | The Revolution: A Manifesto | Ron Paul | Grand Central |
| May 25 | Audition: A Memoir | Barbara Walters | Knopf |
| June 1 | Audition: A Memoir | Barbara Walters | Knopf |
| June 8 | Audition: A Memoir | Barbara Walters | Knopf |
| June 15 | What Happened | Scott McClellan | PublicAffairs |
| June 22 | When You Are Engulfed in Flames | David Sedaris | Little, Brown |
| June 29 | When You Are Engulfed in Flames | David Sedaris | Little, Brown |
| July 6 | When You Are Engulfed in Flames | David Sedaris | Little, Brown |
| July 13 | When You Are Engulfed in Flames | David Sedaris | Little, Brown |
| July 20 | When You Are Engulfed in Flames | David Sedaris | Little, Brown |
| July 27 | When You Are Engulfed in Flames | David Sedaris | Little, Brown |
| August 3 | When You Are Engulfed in Flames | David Sedaris | Little, Brown |
| August 10 | When You Are Engulfed in Flames | David Sedaris | Little, Brown |
| August 17 | The Obama Nation: Leftist Politics and the Cult of Personality | Jerome R. Corsi | Threshold Editions |
| August 24 | The Obama Nation: Leftist Politics and the Cult of Personality | Jerome R. Corsi | Threshold Editions |
| August 31 | The Obama Nation: Leftist Politics and the Cult of Personality | Jerome R. Corsi | Threshold Editions |
| September 7 | The Obama Nation: Leftist Politics and the Cult of Personality | Jerome R. Corsi | Threshold Editions |
| September 14 | sTORI Telling | Tori Spelling with Hilary Liftin | Simon Spotlight |
| September 21 | sTORI Telling | Tori Spelling with Hilary Liftin | Simon Spotlight |
| September 28 | Hot, Flat, and Crowded | Thomas L. Friedman | Farrar, Straus and Giroux |
| October 31 | Against Medical Advice: A True Story | James Patterson, Hal Friedman | Little, Brown and Company |
| November 30 | Too Fat to Fish | Artie Lange with Anthony Bozza | Spiegel & Grau |
| December 7 | Outliers | Malcolm Gladwell | Little, Brown |
| December 15 | Outliers | Malcolm Gladwell | Little, Brown |
| December 21 | Outliers | Malcolm Gladwell | Little, Brown |

== See also ==
- Publishers Weekly list of bestselling novels in the United States in the 2000s
