= Audition (disambiguation) =

An audition is a sample performance by an actor, singer, musician, dancer or other performing artist.

Audition may also refer to:

- The sense of hearing
- Adobe Audition, audio editing software
- Audition Online, an online dance battle game developed by T3 Entertainment and Yedang Online
- Computer audition, a field of study in computer music and engineering

== Film and television ==
- Konkurs, a 1964 Czech film directed by Miloš Forman also known as Audition
- Audition (1999 film), a Japanese horror film directed by Takashi Miike
- Audition (2005 film), a Canadian film also known as L'Audition
- Audition (2007 film), an American student short
- Audition Records, a record label
- Auditions (film) a 1978 film directed by Harry Hurwitz
- "Audition" (Glee), a 2010 episode of Glee
- The Audition (2000 film), an American short film starring Hilary Swank
- The Audition (2015 film), an American short film starring Leonardo DiCaprio and Robert De Niro
- The Audition (2019 film), a German film
- List of I Love Lucy episodes#The Audition, a 1951 episode of I Love Lucy
- Auditions (TV series), a 1962 television series which aired in Melbourne, Australia
- "The Auditions", an episode of the Indian TV series Dhoom Machaao Dhoom

== Literature ==
- Audition: A Memoir, a 2008 autobiographical book by Barbara Walters
- Audition (Murakami novel), a 1997 Japanese novel by Ryu Murakami
- Audition (Kitamura novel), a 2025 novel by Katie Kitamura
- The Audition (novel), a novella in Robert Muchamore's Rock War series

== Music ==
- The Audition (album), a 2003 album by singer Janelle Monáe
- Audition (album), a 2006 album by rapper P.O.S.
- "Audition", a 2006 song by Korean singer Younha
- The Audition (band), a rock band previously signed to Victory Records
- "Audition (The Fools Who Dream)", a song from the 2016 musical film La La Land
