= Life Will Be the Death of Me ...and You Too! =

2019 book by Chelsea Handler

- Author: Chelsea Handler
- Language: English
- Genre: Memoir, humor
- Publisher: Penguin Random House
- Publication date: April 9, 2019
- Publication place: United States
- Media type: Print, e-book
- Pages: 256 pages
- ISBN: 978-0-525-51177-9

Life Will Be the Death of Me ...and You Too! is a 2019 comedic memoir by Chelsea Handler.

== Television series adaptation ==
Upon its 2019 release, there was media speculation that the memoir would be made into a television series with Chelsea Handler as executive producer, since then, the series has not been produced.

== Critical reception ==
The New York Times, "The comedian’s first book in five years follows her into therapy and through a year of political engagement and self-discovery as she adjusts to the Trump presidency with dark humor and a fair amount of cannabis."

Kirkus Reviews, "An adequate self-help memoir from a woman who wouldn’t seem like the type for self-help books."

Publishers Weekly, "Amusingly offbeat and told with the biting sarcasm expected of the TV personality, Handler’s sixth book (after Uganda Be Kidding Me) packs a surprising amount of emotion and introspection."

== External reviews ==
- Goodreads
