= List of Chelsea episodes =

Chelsea was an American web television late-night talk show hosted by comedian Chelsea Handler. The show debuted on May 11, 2016 and streamed Wednesday, Thursday, and Friday each week worldwide on Netflix. The series concluded at 120 episodes as of December 15, 2017, as Handler stated that the show would end at the end of 2017.

== Series overview ==
Season	Episodes	Originally released	
Season	Episodes	First released	Last released
1	90	May 11, 2016	December 16, 2016
2	30	April 14, 2017	December 15, 2017

== Episodes ==
=== Season 1 (2016) ===
No. overall	No. in season	Title	Guests	Original release date	Still available
1	1	"Appetite for Instruction"	Chris Martin, John King, Jr., Drew Barrymore, and Pitbull	May 11, 2016	N
2	2	"Gwyneth & Tony & Chelsea & TED"	Gwyneth Paltrow, Tony Hale, and Chris Anderson	May 12, 2016	N
3	3	"Dinner Party: Captain America & Friends"	Chris Evans, Frank Grillo, Sebastian Stan, Emily VanCamp, and Chadwick Boseman	May 13, 2016	N
4	4	"Gwen Stefani, Tokyo Style & the Night Sun"	Gwen Stefani and Bobak Ferdowsi	May 18, 2016	N
5	5	"Wanda Sykes and the 2016 Political Scene"	Wanda Sykes and Jon Favreau	May 19, 2016	N
6	6	"Christina Aguilera & Chelsea on Ice"	Christina Aguilera, Tony Hale, Bill Hader, Robbie Rogers, Bill Plaschke, Oleg Vasiliev, Vera Bazarova, and Andrei Deputat	May 20, 2016	N
7	7	"Barbara Boxer & Souls to the Polls"	Barbara Boxer and DJ Khaled	May 25, 2016	N
8	8	"Perils of Porn & Rachel Bloom's Big Year"	Noah Church, Gabe Deem, Mike Lee, and Rachel Bloom	May 26, 2016	N
9	9	"Ashton Kutcher & the App Economy"	Ashton Kutcher, Cindy McCain, and Jonathan Abrams	May 27, 2016	N
10	10	"Dinner Party: Adventures in Parenting"	Malin Akerman, Mayim Bialik, Jason Biggs, Melvin Handler, Kate Hudson, Jenny Mollen, and Randall Park	June 1, 2016	Y
11	11	"Magic & GMOs with Lizzy Caplan, Bill Nye"	Lizzy Caplan and Bill Nye	June 2, 2016	N
12	12	"Election Math & Megan Fox"	Jacob Soboroff and Megan Fox	June 3, 2016	N
13	13	"Warrior Dash & Will Arnett"	Martha Stewart, Will Arnett, and Hasan Minhaj	June 8, 2016	N
14	14	"Summits, Thruples & David Spade"	David Spade, Melissa Arnot, and Kiki Sanford	June 9, 2016	N
15	15	"The Case for Cannabis with Wiz Khalifa"	Gavin Newsom, Wiz Khalifa, and Robert Herjavec	June 10, 2016	Y
16	16	"Cocaine Kingpins & the Science of Sleep"	Wagner Moura, Arianna Huffington, and Javier Peña	June 15, 2016	N
17	17	"Elliot Page & Inspiring Role Models"	Elliot Page, Florence Henderson, and Von Miller	June 16, 2016	N
18	18	"Trump Mania & Kegel Exercises"	Keith Olbermann, Anna Faris, and Allison Janney	June 17, 2016	N
19	19	"Paulson, Pelosi & Ayahuasca"	Sarah Paulson, Nancy Pelosi, Jason Biggs, and Jenny Mollen	June 23, 2016	N
20	20	"Biker Life & Michael Strahan"	Norman Reedus, Michael Strahan, Shiri Appleby and Constance Zimmer	June 24, 2016	N
21	21	"Devine, Bamford & Adult Coloring"	Adam DeVine, Maria Bamford, Metta World Peace, and Austan Goolsbee	June 30, 2016	N
22	22	"Anna Kendrick & Social Media Snafus"	Anna Kendrick and Jim Gaffigan	July 1, 2016	N
23	23	"Blake Shelton & Hillary's VP Options"	Blake Shelton and Barney Frank	July 7, 2016	N
24	24	"Tarzan, Mars & Aubrey Plaza"	Alexander Skarsgård and Aubrey Plaza	July 8, 2016	N
25	25	"Vicente Fox & All Things Mexico"	Diego Luna, Eva Longoria, and Vicente Fox	July 13, 2016	N
26	26	"Charlize Theron & Convention Fever"	Charlize Theron, Jacob Soboroff and Bassem Youssef	July 14, 2016	N
27	27	"Bill Maher & Dirty Water Polo Tricks"	Bill Maher, Bill Plaschke, David Spade, Norm Stamper, and Tony Azevedo	July 15, 2016	N
28	28	"LGBTQ Life with Jane Lynch and E.J. Johnson"	Jane Lynch, Carmen Carrera, Fortune Feimster, and EJ Johnson	July 20, 2016	N
29	29	"Bucking the Rules with Melissa McCarthy"	Melissa McCarthy, Zachary Quinto and Nate Ebner	July 21, 2016	Y
30	30	"Brexit's Aftermath & Competitive Tickling"	Adewale Akinnuoye-Agbaje, Paul Feig, David Farrier, and Gordon Ramsay	July 22, 2016	N
31	31	"Trump's Other Reality Show"	NeNe Leakes, Clay Aiken, Lisa Lampanelli, Khloé Kardashian, and Jim Jefferies	July 27, 2016	Y
32	32	"This Is My Home"	Jay Leno and Gillian Jacobs	July 28, 2016	Y
33	33	"Tatiana Maslany Takes All the Good Parts"	Tatiana Maslany and The Go-Go's	July 29, 2016	N
34	34	"Dinner Party: The God Question"	Reese Witherspoon and Common	August 3, 2016	Y
35	35	"Chelsea Does the DNC"	Jacob Soboroff and David Axelrod	August 4, 2016	Y
36	36	"You Have a Speedo For Me?"	Jason Biggs and Denis Leary	August 5, 2016	Y
37	37	"A Prodigy in Our Midst"	Bryce Dallas Howard and James Carville	August 10, 2016	N
38	38	"Putting Compton Back on the Map"	Aja Brown, James Carville, and Michael Kelly	August 11, 2016	N
39	39	"Mission to Moscow"	Maria Sharapova	August 12, 2016	Y
40	40	"The Porn King of Japan"	Ken Shimizu and Jack Huston	August 17, 2016	N
41	41	"Zelda Williams Defies the Trolls"	Zelda Williams and Jon Favreau	August 18, 2016	Y
42	42	"Let's Go on My Tinder"	Sean Rad, Eric André, Joel Kinnaman	August 19, 2016	Y
43	43	"For You to Get This Hostile Is Weird"	Natasha Lyonne, Marc Maron, and Nathan Adrian	August 24, 2016	N
44	44	"We Have Influencers Here"	Kate Upton and Sophia Amoruso	August 25, 2016	N
45	45	"How Could People Go Off on You?"	Ashley Graham, Jana Kramer, and Jimmy Carr	August 26, 2016	N
46	46	"It Felt Like Racist WrestleMania"	Hasan Minhaj, Carly Chaikin, Portia Doubleday, and Stephanie Corneliussen	August 31, 2016	N
47	47	"That's MY Tight End"	Noah Galloway, Jeff Ross, and Max Greenfield	September 1, 2016	Y
48	48	"Oh, This Isn't Funny Anymore"	David Cross and Aaron Eckhart	September 2, 2016	N
49	49	"Dinner Party: The State of Politics"	W. Kamau Bell and S. E. Cupp	September 7, 2016	Y
50	50	"Flashbacks to the Good Old '80s"	Millie Bobby Brown, Gaten Matarazzo, Caleb McLaughlin, Shannon Purser, Abigail Breslin, and Bob Saget	September 8, 2016	N
51	51	"The Right, Fair Thing to Do"	Patricia Arquette and Aisha Tyler	September 9, 2016	N
52	52	"Sex in Space"	Neil deGrasse Tyson and Michael Sheen	September 14, 2016	N
53	53	"I Was a Ticking Time Bomb"	Sarah Silverman and Gloria Steinem	September 15, 2016	N
54	54	"My Story is an American Story"	Diane Guerrero, Mike Colter, and Craig Ferguson	September 16, 2016	N
55	55	"Fame Is Just Weird to Me"	Renée Zellweger, Chris Geere, and Alex Trebek	September 21, 2016	N
56	56	"Would You Buy Your Dad a Hooker?"	Amy Schumer and Mark Cuban	September 22, 2016	Y
57	57	"Bareback Riding Skills"	Chris Pratt	September 23, 2016	N
58	58	"I Was Naked on Broadway"	Lea Michele, Reggie Miller, and T.J. Miller	September 28, 2016	N
59	59	"Boys Are Told Not to Cry"	Edgar Ramirez, Jessica Alba, and Gavin Newsom	September 29, 2016	N
60	60	"When Ann Coulter Calls in Sick"	Kristen Bell and Jacob Soboroff	September 30, 2016	N
61	61	"Climate Change Is Here and It's Real"	Don Cheadle, Joshua Jackson, and Ed Begley Jr.	October 5, 2016	N
62	62	"I Love a Good Mean Joke"	Rob Lowe, John Mulaney, Nick Kroll, and Russell Peters	October 6, 2016	N
63	63	"It's Girl Empowerment"	Krysten Ritter and Rumer Willis	October 7, 2016	N
64	64	"Do You Know How to Use the Car?"	Taylor Lautner, Jonathan Scott, and Drew Scott	October 12, 2016	Y
65	65	"So Let's Take a Test"	John King Jr., Glennon Doyle Melton, and Jennifer Connelly	October 13, 2016	N
66	66	"I Don't Want to Mess Up Again"	Kevin Hart, Jesse Ventura, and Larry King	October 14, 2016	N
67	67	"Dinner Party: These Strong Women"	Hilary Swank, Ava DuVernay, Connie Britton, and the reigning Miss USA	October 19, 2016	Y
68	68	"That's When Madea Was Born"	Tyler Perry, Cobie Smulders, and Alyssa Mastromonaco	October 20, 2016	N
69	69	"I'm Here to Volunteer"	Jason Biggs, Jenny Mollen, Jorge Ramos, Isla Fisher, and Thomas Lennon	October 21, 2016	N
70	70	"Whoa, I'm a Pop Star"	Meghan Trainor, Priyanka Chopra, and Misty Snow	October 26, 2016	N
71	71	"I Feel Like I'm in a Fellini Film"	Felicity Jones, Ron Howard, and Norah Jones	October 27, 2016	N
72	72	"It Tears You Down, and Builds You"	Shannen Doherty	October 28, 2016	N
73	73	"How Dark My Life Once Was"	Nicole Richie and Trevante Rhodes	November 2, 2016	N
74	74	"So Fiercely Proud of My Mom"	Chelsea Clinton and Rose McGowan	November 3, 2016	N
75	75	"Please Take My Knickers Off"	Stella McCartney, Mary McCartney, Colleen Ballinger, and Kimbal Musk	November 4, 2016	N
76	76	"They Said It's a Man's Game"	Carol Burnett, Rob Corddry, and Jessica Mendoza	November 9, 2016	N
77	77	"Do Not Despair About Our Country"	Barbara Boxer, Mary McCormack, and Nikki Glaser	November 11, 2016	Y
78	78	"Dinner Party: The Best Relationships"	Sarah Jessica Parker, Morgan Spurlock, Trevor Noah, and Julianna Margulies	November 17, 2016	Y
79	79	"Inside the Trump Tower Bubble"	Jake Tapper, Maria Shriver, and Matt LeBlanc	November 18, 2016	Y
80	80	"You Secretly Hope You're Worthy"	Emmy Rossum, Valerie Jarrett	November 24, 2016	N
81	81	"You're Basically a Piece of Meat"	Milo Ventimiglia, Kyra Sedgwick	November 25, 2016	N
82	82	"First Train to Tokyo"	TBA	November 30, 2016	Y
83	83	"We Cannot Go Back to Sleep"	Sally Field, Jacob Soboroff, Jason Biggs	December 1, 2016	N
84	84	"You Need to Be More Sexual"	Jessica Chastain, Dale Earnhardt Jr., Van Jones	December 2, 2016	Y
85	85	"Dinner Party: Going to Prison"	Taylor Schilling, Uzo Aduba, Dascha Polanco, Lea DeLaria	December 7, 2016	Y
86	86	"Let's Talk Pipeline"	Susan Sarandon, Gael Garcia Bernal	December 8, 2016	N
87	87	"The Really Uncoordinated Superhero"	Jennifer Aniston, Fetty Wap	December 9, 2016	Y
88	88	"Both Naughty and Nice"	Kate Hudson, L.A. Mayor Eric Garcetti, Cameron Dallas	December 14, 2016	N
89	89	"We Got to See a Beacon of Light"	Common, Maren Morris, Lauren Duca	December 15, 2016	N
90	90	"Can You Tell I'm a Nightmare?"	Jennifer Lawrence, Chris Hardwick	December 16, 2016	Y

=== Season 2 (2017) ===
No. overall	No. in season	Title	Guests	Original release date
91	1	"I Had No Backup Plan Whatsoever"	Melissa McCarthy, Rachel Ramras, Larry Dorf, Hugh Davidson, Ben Falcone, Van Jones	April 14, 2017
92	2	"Women That Are Strong Are Fun"	Charlize Theron, Kumail Nanjiani, Linda Sanchez, Tom Steyer	April 21, 2017
93	3	"Ladies and the Trump"	Rosario Dawson, Tracee Ellis Ross, Aisha Tyler, Cory Booker, Rob Corddry, Nate Corddry	April 28, 2017
94	4	"Dinner Party: Getting Schooled"	Jim Parsons, Rashida Jones, Gaby Hoffmann, Mary McCormack, John B. King	May 5, 2017
95	5	"Answer Me This"	Amy Schumer, Wanda Sykes, Goldie Hawn, Chris Pratt, Adam Schiff, Neil DeGrasse Tyson	May 12, 2017
96	6	"Scientologists and Pirates and Aliens, Oh My"	Geoffrey Rush, Danny McBride, Leah Remini, Pete Buttigieg, Beth Fukumoto, Matthew Craffey, Brian Harrington	May 19, 2017
97	7	"Beauty Pageants, Black-ish and Going Broke"	Priyanka Chopra, Anthony Anderson, Sen. Elizabeth Warren	May 26, 2017
98	8	"Changing the Climate"	Sen. Al Franken, Sarah Silverman, Thomas Middleditch	June 2, 2017
99	9	"To England with Love"	Eddie Izzard	June 9, 2017
100	10	"Tear Down These Walls"	Salma Hayek Pinault, Don Lemon, Jerrod Carmichael	June 16, 2017
101	11	"A Handler-maid's Tale"	Elisabeth Moss, Alison Brie, Betty Gilpin, Janet Mock	June 23, 2017
102	12	"Dinner Party: Good Sports"	Russell Wilson, Kurt Warner, Aly Raisman, Laila Ali	July 14, 2017
103	13	"When Chelsea Met Harry"	Harry Styles, Rita Ora, John Bradley	July 21, 2017
104	14	"The Future Is Now"	Cara Delevingne, Garbiñe Muguruza	July 28, 2017
105	15	"Let's Keep Moving Forward"	Kate Beckinsale, Joey Soloway, Niecy Nash, Congressmen Ted Lieu and Eric Swalwell	August 4, 2017
106	16	"Dear India"	Freida Pinto and Vikas Khanna	August 11, 2017
107	17	"We Are All Sharks"	Reese Witherspoon, Kathy Bates and Dan Rather	September 1, 2017
108	18	"Comfortably Naked"	James Corden, Bella Thorne and Sen. Kirsten Gillibrand	September 8, 2017
109	19	"Handler and High Water"	Jessica Biel, Abbi Jacobson, Ilana Glazer, S.E. Cupp, Evan McMullin and Andrea Savage	September 15, 2017
110	20	"Game Changers"	Emma Stone, Billie Jean, Justin Hartley and Randy Bryce	September 22, 2017
111	21	"The Art of the Kneel"	Reggie Bush, DeRay Mckesson, Maggie Gyllenhaal and Macklemore	September 29, 2017
112	22	"Hart of the Matter"	Kevin Hart, Kris Brown, Igor Volsky and Jackie Chan	October 6, 2017
113	23	"Showing Up Matters"	Dennis Quaid, Nancy Pelosi and Chrissy Metz	October 20, 2017
114	24	"Dinner Party: My American Experience"	TBA	October 27, 2017
115	25	"Gwen We Meet Again"	TBA	November 3, 2017
116	26	"Making a Big Bang"	TBA	November 10, 2017
117	27	"Singing, Storms and Stoned Spelling"	TBA	November 17, 2017
118	28	"Dinner Party: Scandalous"	TBA	December 1, 2017
119	29	"We All Have to Fight and Be Loud"	TBA	December 8, 2017
120	30	"Dinner Party: Ending on a High Note"	Shania Twain, Wiz Kalifa, Dan Reynolds, Jill Scott, Diplo, Haim and Andy Grammer	December 15, 2017
