= I'll Have What She's Having =

2025 book by Chelsea Handler

- Author: Chelsea Handler
- Language: English
- Genre: Essays, humor
- Publisher: Penguin Random House
- Publication date: February 25, 2025
- Publication place: United States
- Media type: Print, e-book

I'll Have What She's Having is a 2025 book by Chelsea Handler that is collection of comedic essays.

== Critical reception ==
The book was a New York Times Best Seller.

The New York Times praised the book for its comedy, but also for its advice and insights that Handler gained from her life experiences and therapy. Variety also wrote positively of the book, comparing it to Handler's 2010 book Chelsea Chelsea Bang Bang.

== External reviews ==
- Kirkus Reviews
