= Belvedere Vodka =

Brand of Polish rye vodka

- Type: Vodka
- Manufacturer: Polmos Żyrardów
- Origin: Poland
- Introduced: 1993
- Alcohol by volume: 40%
- Proof (US): 80
- Related products: List of vodkas
- Website: www.belvederevodka.com

Belvedere Vodka is a brand of Polish rye vodka produced and distributed by LVMH. It is named after Belweder, the Polish presidential palace in Warsaw, whose illustration appears on its bottles. It is produced in the town of Żyrardów in Poland.

The Polish vodka was launched in the United States in 1996 as a "luxury" liquor and is marketed as the world's first super premium vodka. Since entering the U.S. market, Belvedere has partnered with a number of celebrities including Chelsea Handler, Usher and John Legend. In 2015, the brand was chosen as the official vodka of the 24th James Bond film, Spectre.

== History ==
The distillery that produces Belvedere was constructed in 1910. Production began in 1993 at the facility located at Polmos Żyrardów, Poland. It was first imported to the US in 1996 by Eddie Phillips of Phillips Distilling under Phillips Millennium. In 2002, 40% of Millennium was acquired by the luxury goods group LVMH and in April 2005 this stake was raised to 100%. The brand was endorsed by Chelsea Handler and sponsored her Chelsea Chelsea Bang Bang comedy tour based on her book of the same name in 2010.

In 2011, Belvedere Vodka began a partnership with Product Red featuring R&B singer Usher to release a limited edition, specially branded bottle and donating up to 50% of the profits to the Global Fund, which fights HIV/AIDS, malaria and tuberculosis. As part of Belvedere's ongoing partnership with Product Red, John Legend was featured in the brand's 2016 campaign to donate to the Global Fund which included limited edition bottles designed by Esther Mahlangu.

Belvedere was named the Vodka Producer of the Year for the third consecutive year at the International Spirits Challenge in July 2017. In September 2017, the Belvedere announced it would cease production on its 'Unfiltered' version of its vodka and release the Single Estate Rye series. In 2018, Belvedere partnered with singer-songwriter and actress Janelle Monáe to produce a series of short films.

== Production process ==
Belvedere Vodka

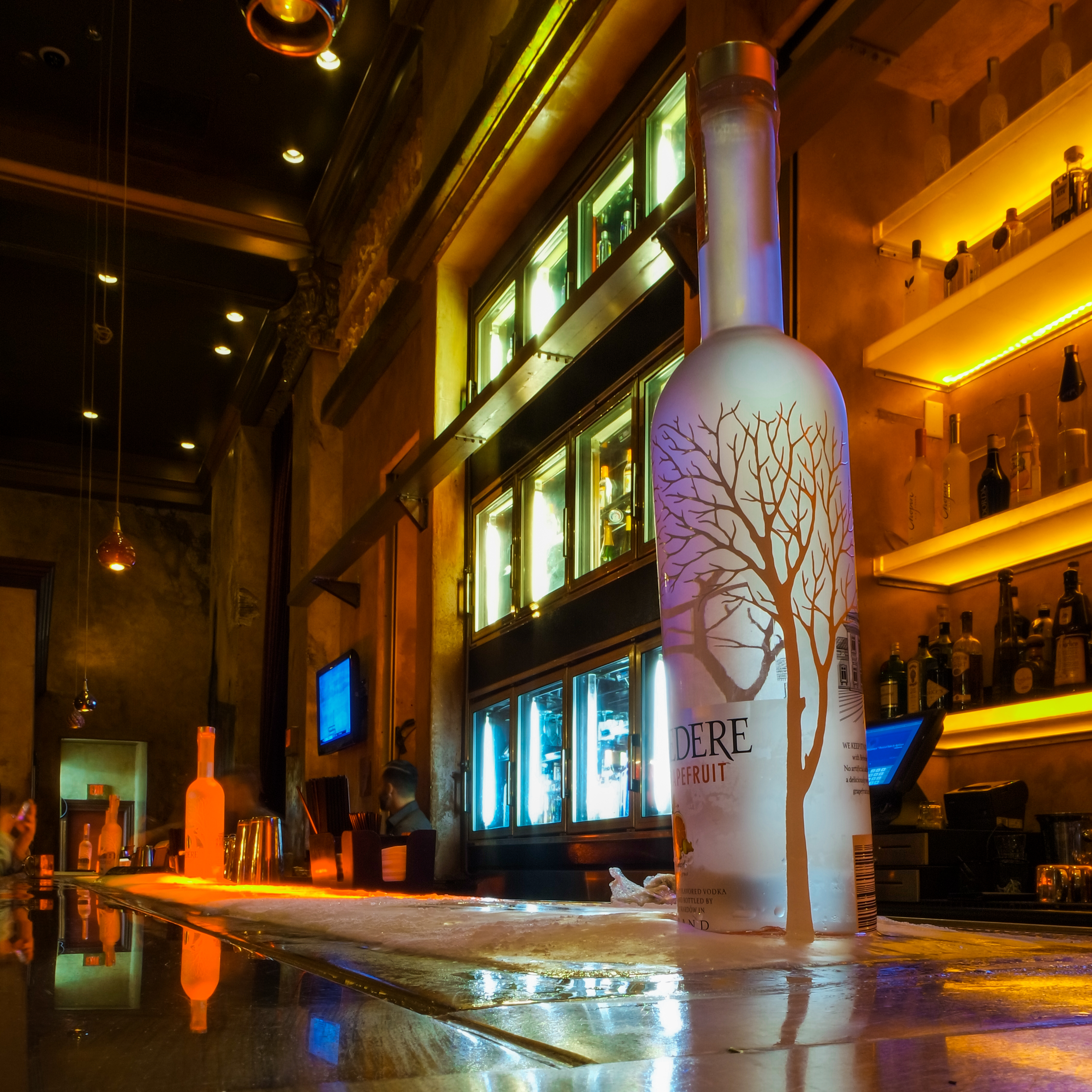
A bottle of Belvedere at a bar at Mandalay Bay in Las Vegas

In order for Belvedere Vodka to be labeled as a super premium Polska Wódka (Polish Vodka), the vodka must be produced using specific Polish grains or potatoes and Polish water. The official labeling of Polish Vodka also requires that no artificial additives be added to vodkas. As such, Belvedere Vodka uses varieties of Dankowskie rye harvested from one of seven nearby farms in its "luxury" vodka. To produce the vodka, the rye is harvested and simmered to form a mash which is then fermented and distilled at an agricultural distillery before undergoing distillation three additional times at the Belvedere distillery.

=== Flavors ===
Belvedere also produces flavored vodkas which are produced using a maceration process. The brand's flavored variants are produced by combining pure spirit with a macerated fruit, which is then distilled at a low temperature to form a macerate concentrate. The concentrated mixture is blended with the distillery's artesian well water to bottling strength and bottled. These flavors are not charcoal filtered, and are filtered through cellulose particle filters prior to bottling. This is done with the intention of ensuring essential oils that carry fruit flavors and give mouth feel are retained. The Belvedere Maceration product line includes Mango Passion, Lemon Tea, Bloody Mary, Pink Grapefruit, Black Raspberry, Orange, Citrus and Ginger Zest.

== Criticism ==
On March 23, 2012, Belvedere Vodka's Twitter and Facebook pages posted a branded image that was attacked for seemingly making light of rape. The image featured a man playfully restraining a woman who appeared to be trying to flee, and the slogan, "Unlike Some People, Belvedere Always Goes Down Smoothly." The image was published on the social media sites for roughly 45 minutes before being pulled. Belvedere's President, Charles Gibb, issued a formal apology for the incident. The ad used a still image from an unrelated video starring Alicyn Packard. Packard did not give permission, and filed a lawsuit against LVMH for violating her publicity rights as an actor. The parties settled for an undisclosed sum after mediation and the action was dismissed on 21 June 2012.

In an analysis commissioned by Swiss TV RTS in May 2014, the Eurofins Scientific group of laboratories revealed the presence of sugar cane or corn while Belvedere's labeling mentions rye alcohol only.
