= Chelsea (TV series) =

American late-night talk show (2016–2017)

- Genre: Talk show
- Directed by: Rik Reinholdtsen; Blake Webster
- Presented by: Chelsea Handler
- Country of origin: United States
- Original language: English
- No. of seasons: 2
- No. of episodes: 120 (list of episodes)

Production
- Executive producers: Bill Wolff (2016); Chelsea Handler; Sue Murphy
- Production location: Culver City, California
- Running time: 27–40 minutes (season 1); 60 minutes (season 2)

Original release
- Network: Netflix
- Release: May 11, 2016 – December 15, 2017

Chelsea is an American television late-night talk show hosted by comedian Chelsea Handler. The show debuted on May 11, 2016, and streamed Wednesday, Thursday, and Friday each week worldwide on Netflix. The show was originally set to have 90 episodes per year, with each episode set to be 30 minutes. Format changes were made for the second season. The show taped Monday, Tuesday, and Wednesday of each week that it aired. It was Netflix's first talk show. The theme song was written by electropop artist Memoryy.

The show covered "real topics" mixed with humor, similar to Handler's previous series, Chelsea Does. The show also regularly had celebrity guests. Her comedic partner Chuy was not part of the series. The show had a global outlook; Handler said, "Netflix makes me able to do stories that are global, and it makes me able to pay attention to the stuff that does interest me in a way that will be able to be disseminated into all these different countries."

The second season premiered on April 14, 2017 and consist of 30 episodes . Unlike the first season, which aired 3 nights a week, the second season aired only once a week. On October 18, 2017, it was announced that the show would not be renewed for a third season.

== Background ==
Chelsea is part of Handler's deal with Netflix that she made in July 2015, which included a stand-up special titled Uganda Be Kidding Me Live and a four-part docu-comedy special called Chelsea Does.

On March 16, 2016, Handler announced on Twitter that each episode would be released at 12:01 a.m. Pacific Time on Wednesday, Thursday and Friday mornings, three times a week, including holiday periods where episodes would be "banked" for release or reduced to airing two per week. On that same day, Handler submitted a hand-written memo to herself concerning the new show, saying "Premieres May 11th". She announced that she and Netflix would unveil the name of the show on her Twitter chat.

Regarding the title of the show, Handler said that "We thought long and hard about the title for my ... Netflix show, and there was a whole team at Netflix who worked on it; we hired a digital department and some small children who work in various countries to help roll this show out, and after two to three long hours, we came up with the name Chelsea".

The show was not aired live, but was filmed in front of a live audience. Handler explained: "It has to be fed into 190 countries, which prohibits us from going live on Netflix, so we're going to tape and then they will stream and feed it into every other country and territory that they're in and then it will come on about probably 12 hours after we tape it."

She expressed that she wanted the show to be different from the typical late-night format saying, "I don't want it to be like a talk show every night where I come out singing and dancing every night."

In October 2017, the show was cancelled by Netflix after two seasons. Handler made the announcement via social media, taking ownership of the decision and announcing a new documentary where she hoped to focus more on national politics. Though Handler claims to have made the decision, sources speculate at the significance of the poor reception of the show since its debut.

== Episodes ==
Season	Episodes	Originally released	
Season	Episodes	First released	Last released
1	90	May 11, 2016	December 16, 2016
2	30	April 14, 2017	December 15, 2017

== Reception ==
Chelsea received mixed critical reception. On Rotten Tomatoes the first season holds a 41% approval rating with an average rating of 4.4 out of 10 based on 22 reviews. The site's critic consensus claims: "Chelsea comes up short in its attempts to innovate the conventional talk show format – and even worse, it frequently fails to be smart or funny." The first season has a score of 50 out of 100 on Metacritic, indicating "mixed or average reviews". The Decider said the show is "riddled with execution problems," and that it needs to decide if it wants to be "timely or evergreen."
