= Lies That Chelsea Handler Told Me =

2011 book by Chelsea Handler

- Jacket of Lies That Chelsea Handler Told Me
- Editor: Chelsea Handler
- Author: Glen Handler; Roy Handler; Shoshonna Handler; Johnny Kansas; Eva Magdalenski; Amber Mazzola; Amy Meyer; Heather McDonald; Stephanie Stehling; Brad Wollack; Josh Wolf; Chunk
- Language: English
- Genre: Creative nonfiction
- Publisher: Grand Central Publishing
- Publication date: May 15, 2011
- Publication place: United States
- Media type: Print (hardcover)
- Pages: 304 pp (first edition)
- ISBN: 9780446584715
- Preceded by: Chelsea Chelsea Bang Bang
- Followed by: Uganda Be Kidding Me

Lies That Chelsea Handler Told Me is the fourth book by American comedian Chelsea Handler that was published in May 2011. This book was a part of a three-book deal Handler signed in November 2010. The book was followed by a "Lies That Chelsea Handler Told Me" Tour, on which Handler was accompanied by the Comedians of Chelsea Lately.

== Synopsis ==
The book consists of humorous essays written by Handler's coworkers and family members about lies and pranks Handler has pulled on them.

== Essays ==
The chapters (essays) are in the book as follows, with the authors name in parentheses

1. Zookeeper (Johnny Kansas)
2. Pap Smears and Punctuation Marks (Stephanie Stehling)
3. How to Make a Marriage Work (Heather McDonald)
4. A Brother's Testimony (Roy Handler)
5. My Name is Brad Wollack and I'm Unattractive (Brad Wollack)
6. Dial tone, a Chelsea Specialty (Amber Mazzola)
7. Go Lakers (Josh Wolf)
8. Sisterly Love (Shoshonna Handler)
9. Eva is My Name, Comedy is My Game (Eva Magdalenski)
10. Lies and Other Things I Wish Were Lies (Amy Meyer)
11. Pubescent and Adolescent Mendacity, 1985-1991 (Glen Handler)
12. Standards and Practices
13. Raise the Woof (Chunk)
