= My Horizontal Life =

2005 book by Chelsea Handler

My Horizontal Life: A Collection of One-Night Stands
- Author: Chelsea Handler
- Language: English
- Genre: Memoir/Comedy
- Publisher: Bloomsbury USA
- Publication date: May 12, 2005
- Publication place: United States
- Media type: Softcover
- Pages: 213
- ISBN: 978-1-58234-618-2
- OCLC: 57432267
- Dewey Decimal: 306.7 22
- LC Class: HQ801 .H3195 2005
- Followed by: Are You There, Vodka? It's Me, Chelsea

My Horizontal Life: A Collection of One-Night Stands is a book by Chelsea Handler that was published in 2005. The book is a collection of stories about the author's various one-night stands. The book helped her to launch her writing career and led to her second book Are You There, Vodka? It's Me, Chelsea.

== Reception ==
Following the release of her second book Are You There Vodka? It's Me, Chelsea, sales of her first book rocketed; the two titles have sold a combined total of 1.7 million copies, according to Nielsen BookScan and have both topped several bestseller lists.
