= Chelsea Handler: The Feeling =

- Starring: Chelsea Handler
- Country of origin: United States
- Original language: English

Original release
- Network: Netflix
- Release: March 25, 2025

Chelsea Handler: The Feeling is a stand-up comedy special by Chelsea Handler that premiered on March 25, 2025, on Netflix.

The special was filmed at the New Jersey Wellmont Theater and written by Handler and Shannon Hartman.
