= Mistaken Identity: Two Families, One Survivor, Unwavering Hope =

2008 book by Don Van Ryn

Mistaken Identity
- Author: Don and Susie van Ryn; Newell, Colleen and Whitney Cerak; and Mark Tabb
- Language: English
- Publisher: Howard Books
- Publication date: March 25, 2008
- Publication place: United States
- Media type: Print (Hardcover)
- Pages: 288
- ISBN: 978-1-4165-6735-6
- OCLC: 191758333
- Dewey Decimal: 617.4/810440922 B 22
- LC Class: RC1045.P78 M57 2008

Mistaken Identity: Two Families, One Survivor, Unwavering Hope is a best-selling non-fiction book describing an incident in which the identities of two young female casualties were confused after a vehicle crash. It was published by Howard Books on March 25, 2008. The book lists its authors as Don and Susie van Ryn; Newell, Colleen and Whitney Cerak; and Mark Tabb; the former the parents of Laura van Ryn (the woman believed to have survived the crash but actually deceased) and the latter the parents of Whitney Cerak, initially declared deceased in the crash but later found to have survived. Mark Tabb is a former pastor whom The New York Times described as "the go-to guy when a collaborator is needed on books with spiritual themes."

Both the identity mixup and the book's release received worldwide media attention. It was the subject of a two-hour episode of Dateline NBC, a program of The Oprah Winfrey Show, and a segment featured on The Today Show. The book was ranked 1st place for two weeks on the adult non-fiction New York Times Best Seller list in 2008. The incident prompted the states of Michigan and Indiana to pursue legislation concerning stricter guidelines in the process of identification of bodies by coroners.

== Story ==
On April 26, 2006, a Taylor University van carrying nine students and staff members collided with a tractor-trailer being driven by Robert F. Spencer on Interstate 69 in Indiana. Five people riding in the van died at the crash scene: Elizabeth Smith, Laurel Erb, Bradley Larson, and Monica Felver, and a young blonde woman the coroner identified as Whitney Cerak. A similar looking woman who survived but was unable to communicate was identified as Laura van Ryn. However, after five weeks of hospitalization the identity of the surviving woman began to be questioned. She was found to be Whitney Cerak, not Laura van Ryn.

Some physical similarities existed between the two women; the severity of the injuries, which included severe head trauma and the immediate inability to communicate, led local government officials to misidentify the casualties. As a result, Cerak was taken care of by the van Ryn family in the belief that she was their daughter. Meanwhile, Laura was interred in a marked grave at a funeral with 1400 people in attendance. Five weeks passed before incidents arose that caused suspicion about Cerak's identity: she made comments about things and people that were inconsistent with facts pertaining to Laura, and a university roommate also reported some physical discrepancies. Cerak's identity was revealed when hospital staff asked her to write down her name; her identity was further confirmed by dental records. The mixup appeared to have been caused by the similarities of appearance between Cerak and van Ryn, and the confusion at the crash scene when Laura's purse was found near Whitney's body. A memorial service was held for van Ryn in June. Neither family spoke publicly about the incident for nearly two years.

During the Dateline interview, it was noted that the van Ryn family suspected for several days something was amiss with Cerak before their concerns were shared with the hospital staff. The family noticed her teeth, as well as a navel piercing that van Ryn did not have. Cerak referred to herself as "Whitney" when she emerged from the coma and accused "her" parents of being "false parents" and told "her" sister their parent's names were Newell and Colleen. The van Ryns explained that their believing in the misidentification for a month was reinforced by reassurance by the hospital staff of the patient's identity and the distress of the situation.

== Fiction resembling the incident ==
Several screen productions since and before the events have featured stories of mistaken identity under similar circumstances:

- Reunion, and Turnabout – the second chapter of 2002 videogame Phoenix Wright: Ace Attorney − Justice for All
- "And Here's To You, Mrs. Azrael" – a 2006 episode of CSI: NY
- "Alone" – a 2007 episode of House, M.D.
- All We Know Of Heaven – a 2008 novel by Jacquelyn Mitchard that draws inspiration from the case
- "Identity" – a 2012 episode of Body of Proof
- The Pretty One – a 2013 film with Zoe Kazan playing both women
- 9-1-1 (TV series) (season 5) ”home and away”
