= Chelsea Handler =

American comedian, actress, writer, and producer (born 1975)

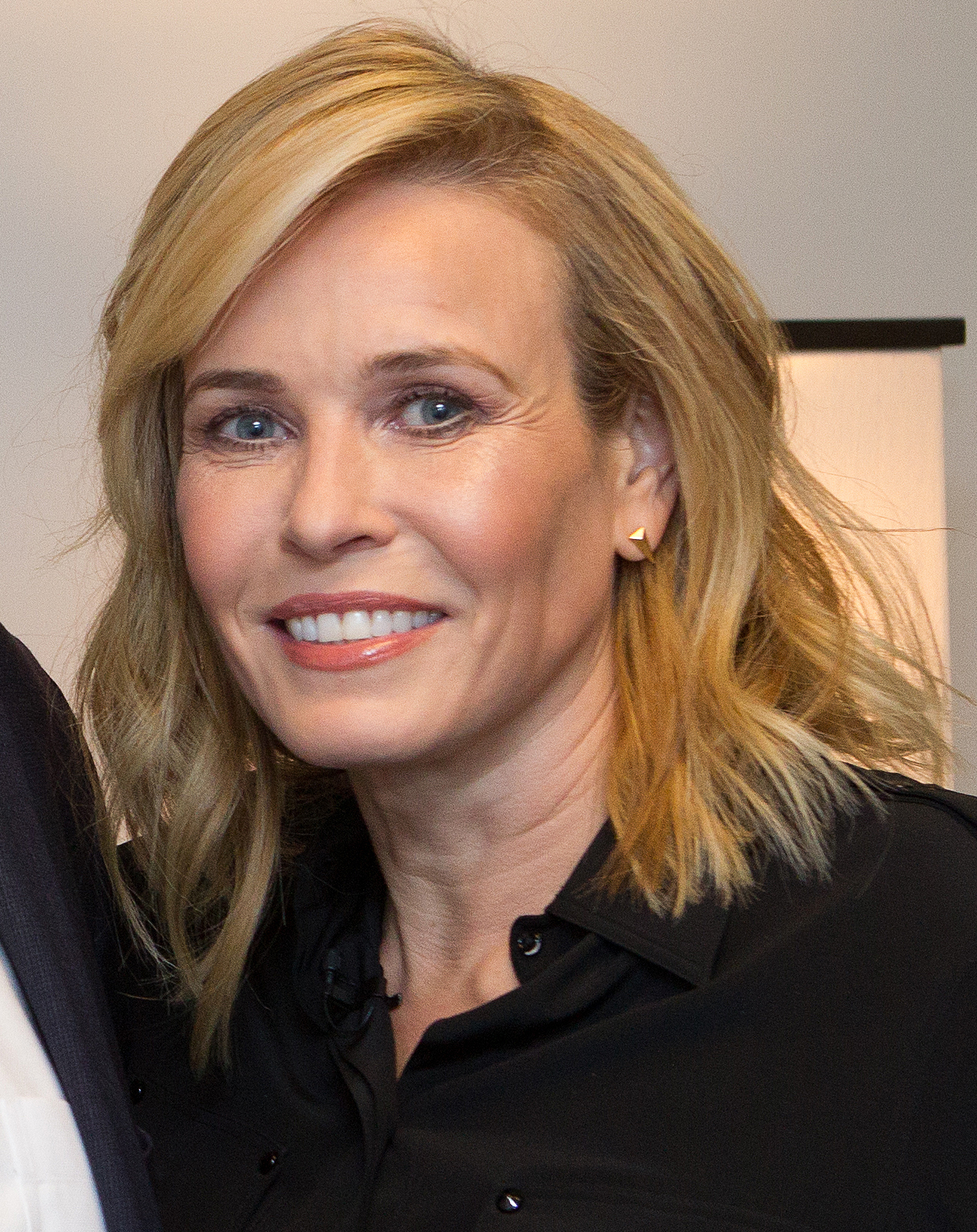
- Handler in 2016
- Born: Chelsea Joy Handler; February 25, 1975 (age 51); Livingston, New Jersey, U.S.

Comedy career
- Years active: 2001–present
- Medium: Stand-up; television; film; books
- Genres: Observational comedy; sketch comedy; blue comedy; insult comedy; surreal humor; satire; sarcasm
- Subjects: American culture; American politics; everyday life; pop culture; current events; sex; gender differences; human behavior; race relations; human sexuality
- Website: chelseahandler.com

Chelsea Joy Handler (born February 25, 1975) is an American stand-up comedian, actress, writer, television host, and producer. She hosted the late-night talk show Chelsea Lately on the E! network from 2007 to 2014 and released a documentary series, Chelsea Does, on Netflix in January 2016. From 2016 to 2017, Handler hosted the talk show Chelsea on Netflix.

In 2012, Time named Handler one of the 100 most influential people in the world on its annual Time 100 list.

== Early life and education ==
Handler was born in Livingston, New Jersey, the youngest of six children of Rita (née Stoecker), a homemaker, and Seymour Handler, a used-car dealer. Her American father was an Ashkenazi Jew; her German mother, who immigrated to the U.S. in 1958, was a Mormon. Commenting on her religious upbringing, Handler said: "I grew up as a Jew and a Mormon ... I chose Jewish obviously. Mormonism is so ridiculous. But I related to ... that conflict of religion for both parents." Handler was raised in Reform Judaism, and had a Bat Mitzvah. In 2013, as an adult, she discovered that her maternal grandfather served in the German army during World War II, on the TLC series Who Do You Think You Are?.

She summered on Martha's Vineyard, where her parents owned a house. She attended Livingston High School, where she was a reluctant student who objected to the school's "student-teacher-asshole ratio".

Handler has two sisters and three brothers; her eldest brother Chet died when he was 22 in a hiking accident in Grand Teton National Park in Wyoming.She was nine years old at the time. At age 19, she moved from New Jersey to Los Angeles, where she lived in her aunt's home in Bel Air, and pursued acting while working as a waitress to support herself. At 21, Handler decided to pursue stand-up comedy after telling her story about being arrested for driving under the influence to a class of other offenders, who found it funny.

Her mother was diagnosed with breast cancer in 1989 and battled the disease for over 15 years before dying of it in 2006.

== Career ==
=== Television work ===
Handler was a member of the all-female cast of Oxygen's hidden camera reality television series Girls Behaving Badly, which aired from 2002 to 2005. She also appeared on other shows including Weekends at the D.L., The Bernie Mac Show, My Wife and Kids, and The Practice. She was a regular commentator on E! and Scarborough Country as well as a correspondent on The Tonight Show. She hosted the first episode of the reality TV show On the Lot but quit before the second episode aired, saying later that she left "because I smelled the disaster happening before it did." The show, produced by Steven Spielberg and Mark Burnett, was a competition for aspiring filmmakers vying for a chance at stardom. It lasted one season. Handler was replaced by former Robin & Company entertainment anchor Adrianna Costa.

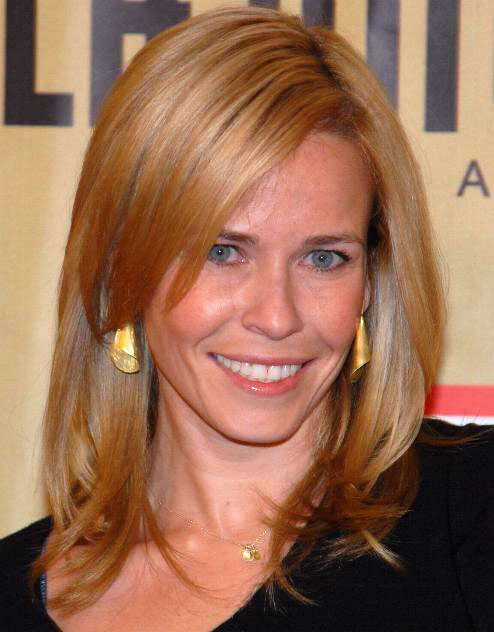
Handler at LA Direct magazine's "Remember to Give" holiday party in 2007

In April 2006, Handler began hosting The Chelsea Handler Show on E!, which lasted two seasons. In 2007, Handler performed with Comedy Central's Hour Stand-Up Comedy Tour across the United States. Her stand-up comedy has also been televised on VH1's Love Lounge, Comedy Central's Premium Blend, and HBO's broadcast of the Aspen Comedy Festival. She was a guest on Red Eye w/ Greg Gutfeld and The View, and she co-hosted The View on August 2, 2007, and September 5, 2008. On August 18, 2010, it was announced that Handler would be the host of the 2010 MTV Video Music Awards (VMAs). The announcement was surprising to many, including MTV representatives, who claimed that the final decision was unexpected. This made Handler the second woman in the history of the VMAs to be the sole host of the ceremony, after Roseanne Barr, who hosted in 1994. The event took place at the Nokia Theatre in Los Angeles on September 12, 2010.

In July 2007, Handler began starring in her own half-hour late-night comedy series on E! titled Chelsea Lately. The show proved to be a hit by averaging more than a half-million viewers and having clips on YouTube with more than one million views. In a 2008 interview, Handler said, "The worse the guests are, the more pathetic they are, the funnier the show is." Chelsea Lately was broadcast weekdays on the E! Network in the US, Canada, UK, Australia, Germany, and New Zealand. After more than 1,000 episodes, the final episode of Chelsea Lately aired on August 26, 2014.

The show had a spin-off, the mockumentary After Lately, in which the various cast members, writers, crew, guests and even "hangers-on" of Chelsea Lately were shown bickering over trivial matters and competing for airtime on the show. They also were shown seeking personal approval from Handler, who appeared in very few scenes of the program and was always portrayed as having open and utter disdain for everyone beneath her. After Lately debuted on E! on March 6, 2011. Guest stars included Reese Witherspoon, Jennifer Aniston, Jay Leno, Tori Spelling, Jenny McCarthy, Sharon Osbourne, Dave Grohl, Johnny Knoxville, and Jane Fonda.

In 2007, Handler appeared in the Internet-based program In the Motherhood with Leah Remini and Jenny McCarthy (since January 2008). On September 8, 2008, it was announced that ABC would be turning In The Motherhood into a series starring Jessica St. Clair, Megan Mullally, and Cheryl Hines.

Are You There, Chelsea? was an NBC sitcom based on Handler's 2008 best-selling book Are You There, Vodka? It's Me, Chelsea, which aired from January 11 to March 28, 2012. On May 11, 2012, the network canceled it after only one season. Laura Prepon played main character Chelsea Newman, a cocktail waitress, while Handler portrayed Chelsea's born-again Christian sister Sloane, a married, conservative, new mom who had little in common with her carefree sister. Dottie Zicklin (of Dharma & Greg) and Julie Larson (of The Drew Carey Show) were creators and executive producers. Handler served as executive producer, along with Tom Werner (of That '70s Show), Mike Clements (of The Life & Times of Tim), and Tom Brunelle (of Chelsea Lately).

In 2016, Handler filmed a documentary series for Netflix titled Chelsea Does, consisting of four episodes on marriage, Silicon Valley, racism, and drugs. In May 2016, she began presenting her new Netflix original comedy talk show Chelsea. Handler said she envisioned a show more serious than Chelsea Lately: "I would like a healthy mix of everything that goes on around the world, mixed with interesting stuff in our country. The well-roundedness of 60 Minutes but faster, quicker, cooler." The first season streamed Wednesday, Thursday and Friday each week; season 2 streamed every Friday. In October 2017, Handler announced that the show would be concluding after its second season, as she wished to focus on activism.

In August 2018, Handler revealed she had begun working on a documentary for Netflix examining the concept of white privilege and the impact it has had on her life's trajectory. Titled Hello, Privilege. It's Me, Chelsea, it was released in September 2019.

In May 2020, Handler announced she will produce and star in a stand-up special for WarnerMedia's HBO Max. In it, she will discuss her life experiences regarding family, friendships, and therapy. Her manager, Irving Azoff, and Allison Statter will also join Handler in producing the special.

=== Production work ===
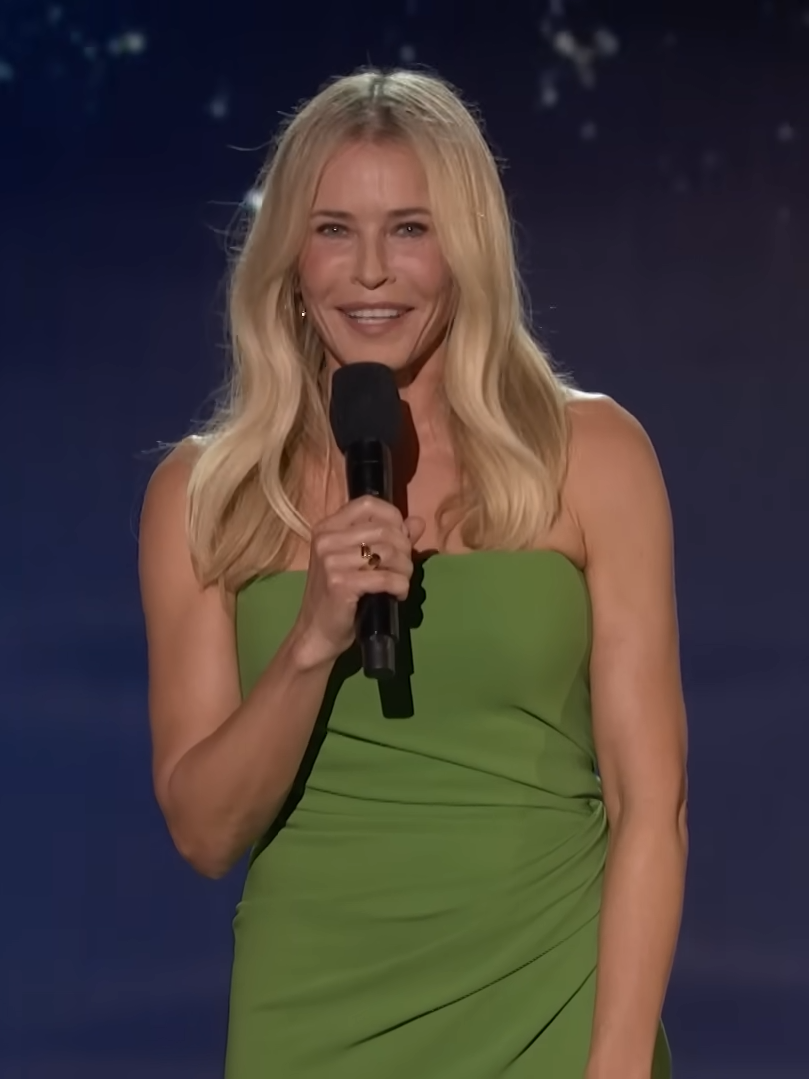
Handler at the 29th Critics' Choice Awards in 2024

In 2010, Handler and Tom Brunelle became producers of Pretty Wild, a reality series centered on the lives of the Neiers sisters. Her production company, Borderline Amazing Productions, and New Wave Entertainment produced the series. It was canceled after one season.

Handler has become executive producer of several talk shows aside from her own. In 2012, Handler became executive producer through Borderline Amazing for a weekly half-hour talk show on E! hosted by Whitney Cummings. Titled Love You, Mean It With Whitney Cummings, it debuted in November 2012, but was canceled after four months, in February 2013. Later that same year, Handler produced Ross Mathews's new talk show on E!, Hello Ross. The show was canceled after two seasons, in 2014. In 2015, Handler produced Josh Wolf's The Josh Wolf Show, which debuted in June 2015 on CMT. The show was canceled in 2016.

In October 2017, Handler had partnered with TNT to develop a potential drama series based on Jarrett Kobek's book, I Hate the Internet, as executive producer, together with Studio T, Studio 8's Katherine Pope, Michael Morris, and Kobek. The series will examine the phenomenon of internet discussions and dialogues and what impact it has on one's values and relationships.

In November 2017, Hulu began developing Unspeakable, a new dramedy based on Meghan Daum's 2014 book, The Unspeakable: And Other Subjects Of Discussion. Handler had optioned the book at Working Title Television in 2014. The show, starring Mary McCormack in the lead role, focuses on a 45-year-old woman trying to find her authentic self while navigating through difficult subjects. Handler will executive produce with Liza Chasin and Andrew Stearn, with collaboration from McCormack and her husband, Michael Morris.

In March 2018, Handler signed a multi-year first-look deal with NBCUniversal, in which she would develop programming for Universal Television and Universal Television Alternate Studio.

In February 2019, Marvel Television and Hulu expanded their partnership for several new animated series based on the comics' off-kilter characters. Of the four planned, Handler would produce Marvel's Tigra & Dazzler Show, together with Jeph Loeb and Erica Rivinoja. The series was planned to be based on the story of two "woke" superhero best friends, Tigra and Dazzler, as they fought for recognition. However, in December 2019, Rivinoja and the series' writers departed the project after creative differences, leaving Handler and Loeb remaining on the production team. In January 2020, Marvel Studios scrapped the series.

In September 2020, Handler executive produced and sold two comedies she developed at Universal: Blair, sold to HBO Max, follows a judgmental young woman who is at her own rock-bottom, and Wiped Out, sold to Peacock, chronicles a woman's quest to rebuild her life after her existence is erased from the world following a passing black hole.

=== Writings ===
Handler has written six books that have been #1 on The New York Times Best Seller list. Her first book, My Horizontal Life (2005), describes the variety of sexual encounters she has experienced throughout her life. Her second book, Are You There, Vodka? It's Me, Chelsea (2008), a collection of humorous essays, hit the top of The New York Times Nonfiction Best Seller List on May 11, 2008, with a print run of more than 350,000. She went on a nationwide tour to promote her third book, Chelsea Chelsea Bang Bang, which was released on March 9, 2010. Chelsea Chelsea Bang Bang hit Number 1 on The New York Times Nonfiction Hardback Bestseller list for March 21, 2010.

On November 15, 2010, it was announced that Handler's publishers gave her her own publishing imprint, Borderline Amazing/A Chelsea Handler Book. She also signed a three-book deal with the imprint, the first of which is called Lies That Chelsea Handler Told Me, where her coworkers and family members discuss their experiences with Handler, which was released in May 2011 and also hit the top of the bestseller list.

Handler has her own columns in Cosmopolitan and Now, a UK celebrity magazine. In May 2009, she was the host of the 20th Annual GLAAD Media Awards in San Francisco. In June 2009, she was named as grand marshal of the 2009 Los Angeles Pride celebration "for her visible and vocal support of equality". In July 2010, during a tour stop in Salt Lake City, Handler took part in the "I Am Equal" photo documentary project in memory of her mother, Rita, who died from complications of cancer. Along with her photo being added to the documentary and accompanying photo mosaic, she also shared a "Photo Story" with a message that inspires people to take chances in life. In March 2012, she hosted the Human Rights Campaign Gala in Los Angeles.

In early 2014, Handler released her fifth book, Uganda Be Kidding Me, which was number one on The New York Times Best Seller list for two weeks. That same year, in June, Handler did the stand-up show Uganda Be Kidding Me: Live, which was then released on Netflix in October 2014.

In April 2019, Handler published her first memoir, Life Will Be the Death of Me ...and You Too!, through Penguin Random House, which reached the top spot on The New York Times Bestsellers list. The memoir focuses on her experiences during her year of self-discovery. She embarked on a comedy tour to promote the memoir. Universal TV acquired the rights in September 2019 to adapt the book into a television series.

== Public image ==
In 2010, Handler was ranked on the Forbes Celebrity 100 at No. 98. In 2012, Time named Handler one of the 100 most influential people in the world on its annual Time 100 list.

In 2009, she posed nude for the May issue of Allure magazine.

That same year, she appeared on one of the two covers for the December edition of Playboy. Inside the magazine, Handler posed for a non-nude pictorial.

She was also featured on the cover of Shape in April 2010, The Hollywood Reporter in June 2011, on Redbook's March 2012 issue, and on the cover of the September 2012 issue of Marie Claire.

Handler often receives press coverage for her parody images on Instagram. These include imitating a "thirsty" selfie by Martha Stewart in her swimming pool, sitting on a horse topless like Vladimir Putin, and showing her naked behind like Kim Kardashian's cover for the magazine Paper.

== Awards and recognition ==
- In March 2009, Handler received the "Ally for Equality Award" from the Human Rights Campaign, recognizing "the outstanding efforts of those who dedicate time, energy, spirit and whole-hearted commitment to better the lives of LGBT people".
- In April 2009, Handler won the Bravo A-List Award for "A-List Funny."
- In June 2009, she was named as grand marshal of the 2009 Los Angeles Pride celebration "for her visible and vocal support of equality".
- In July 2012, Handler received the Comedy Person of the Year Award at Montreal's Just For Laughs comedy festival.
- In December 2021, Handler won "The Comedy Act of 2021" award at the People's Choice Awards for her "Vaccinated & Horny" Tour.
- Handler was nominated for the 2022 Grammy Award for Best Comedy Album for the stand-up special Evolution.

== Political views and activism ==
Handler's political activism work has included speaking at universities and collaborating with EMILY's List to gather support for Democratic women supporting abortion rights and helping them to get elected. In a 2011 interview with The New York Times, Handler revealed that she had an abortion at age sixteen, saying she had the procedure "because that's what I should have done. Otherwise I would now have a 20-year-old kid. Anyway, those are things that people shouldn't be dishonest about." In a 2016 interview with Playboy magazine, Handler revealed that she had a second abortion when she was sixteen in addition to the one she talked about with The New York Times.

Handler was a vocal supporter of 2016 presidential candidate Hillary Clinton and was critical of her opponent Donald Trump. She stated in 2016 that a Trump presidency would be "the end of our civilization". She was criticized for using homophobic insults and slurs against key Trump administration figures on multiple occasions, including implying that Senator Lindsey Graham was a closeted homosexual and referring to Attorney General Jeff Sessions as a "bottom".

On October 23, 2020, Handler appeared on The Tonight Show Starring Jimmy Fallon. In reaction to 50 Cent endorsing Trump for re-election in a Twitter post that referenced taxes on high-income earners, she said that she "had to remind him that he was a black person, so he can't vote for Donald Trump, and that he shouldn't be influencing an entire swath of people who may listen to him because he's worried about his own personal pocketbook". After watching the interview, 50 Cent backtracked and said he "never liked" Trump.

=== Israel ===
In 2015, Handler headlined a comedy fundraiser in Israel, benefiting the Tal Center at the Oncology Institute of Sheba Hospital in Tel HaShomer before conducting an interview with former Israeli President Shimon Peres in Jerusalem.

In May 2018, after the killing of over 50 Palestinian protestors during the Gaza border protests, Handler criticized Ivanka Trump and Jared Kushner for celebrating the opening of the United States Embassy in Jerusalem during the violence. She also tweeted, "Nikki Haley is on tv talking about Hamas being responsible for the Palestinians protesting yesterday. These people had no weapons. They had tires to burn. There was a dead baby. While Netanyahu celebrates."

Following the October 7 attacks in 2023, Handler signed the "No Hostage Left Behind Letter", an open letter to US President Joe Biden demanding the release of all Israeli hostages taken by Hamas during the attack. In December 2023, Handler appeared in a video with Zionist activist and actress Noa Tishby on TikTok in which they criticized American progressives for their criticisms of Israel's actions during the Gaza war, with Handler adding that Israel represented the protection of "Western democracy and western values."

As a result of her views on Israel, pro-Palestinian protestors disrupted a comedy show by Handler in Virginia on April 19, 2024, accusing her of being a "genocide supporter." One woman was arrested and several others were removed from the premises. In September 2024, Handler signed another letter by 62 artists and performers organized by pro-Israel advocacy groups StopAntisemitism, StandWithUs, End Jew Hatred and 2024 New Voices calling for Biden and Vice President Kamala Harris to "pressure the terrorists to release the hostages now", as well as urging the administration to "protect and support" Israel during the war.

== Personal life ==
Handler has lived in Bel Air, Los Angeles. She has never married and does not have children.

=== Relationships ===
In 2006, Handler began dating Ted Harbert, who oversaw E!. On January 25, 2010, Handler confirmed, via her late-night talk show, that she had broken up with Harbert.

Handler briefly dated rapper 50 Cent around 2011.

On October 3, 2013, Handler confirmed her breakup with hotelier André Balazs on her talk show Chelsea Lately, after the couple had dated on and off for two years.

On September 27, 2021, Handler and comedian Jo Koy posted an official Instagram post confirming their relationship. They later broke up.

In 2010, a leaked sex tape of Handler was being offered for sale. After news of it broke, she said on Chelsea Lately that the tape had been made "as a joke" more than ten years prior, stating she had been showing it for years at birthday parties.

== Filmography ==
=== Television and film ===
Chelsea Handler's performances in television and film
Year	Title	Role	Notes
2001	Spy TV	Various	
2001	The Plotters	Ann	
2002	The Practice	Callie Fairbanks	Episode: "Eat and Run"
2002	My Wife and Kids	Nurse Amy	Episode: "Diary of a Mad Teen"
2004	The Bernie Mac Show	Doris Flynt	Episode: "Five Stages of Bryana"
2004	Girls Behaving Badly	Various	TV series
2005	Totally High		
2006	The Chelsea Handler Show	Various	12 episodes; also creator, writer, and producer
2006	National Lampoon Presents Cattle Call	Nikita	
2006	Reno 911!	Pinky	Episode: "Spanish Mike Comes Back"
2007	Steam	Jacky	
2007	In the Motherhood	Heather	Webseries
2009	The Good Wife	Herself	Episode: "Threesome"
2011	Hop	Mrs. Beck	
2011–2013	Whitney	Dr. Price	2 episodes
2012	This Means War	Trish	
2012	Are You There, Chelsea?	Sloane Bradley	7 episodes; also executive producer
2012	Fun Size	Joy DeSantis	
2013	Web Therapy	Chris Endicott	3 episodes
2013	Call Me Crazy: A Five Film	Alex	A Lifetime Original Movie
2014	The Comeback	Herself	Episode: "Valerie Makes a Pilot"
2015	The Muppets	Herself	Episode: "Too Hot to Handler"
2019	Will & Grace	Donna Zimmer	Episode: "Family, Trip"
2024	Not Dead Yet	Sharon Darynson	Episode: "Not in the Game Yet"
2024	Prom Dates	Barb	

=== As herself ===
Chelsea Handler's non-performing credits
Year	Title	Credited as	Notes
2007	Comedy Central Presents	Herself	Comedy Central special
2007–2014	Chelsea Lately	Host	E! late-night talk show
2010	2010 MTV Video Music Awards	Host	MTV special
2010	Pretty Wild	Executive producer	E! reality series
2011–2013	After Lately	Herself	E! mockumentary series
2012–2013	Love You, Mean It with Whitney Cummings	Executive producer	E! late-night talk show
2013–2014	Hello Ross	Executive producer	E! late-night talk show
2014	Uganda Be Kidding Me: Live	Herself	Netflix stand-up special
2015–2016	The Josh Wolf Show	Executive producer	CMT late-night talk show
2016	Chelsea Does	Herself	Netflix documentary series
2016–2017	Chelsea	Herself/host	Netflix talk show
2019	Hello, Privilege. It's Me, Chelsea	Herself	Netflix documentary series
2020	Chelsea Handler: Evolution	Herself	HBO Max stand-up special
2022	Chelsea Handler: Revolution	Herself	Netflix stand-up special
2023	The Daily Show	Guest host	4 episodes (week of February 6)
2024	29th Critics' Choice Awards	Host	TV special
2025	30th Critics' Choice Awards	Host	TV special
2025	Chelsea Handler: The Feeling	Herself	Netflix stand-up special

== Published works ==
- Handler, Chelsea (2005). My Horizontal Life: A Collection of One-Night Stands. New York: Bloomsbury USA. ISBN 978-1-58234-618-2.
- Handler, Chelsea (2008). Are You There, Vodka? It's Me, Chelsea. New York: Simon Spotlight Entertainment. ISBN 978-1-4169-5412-5.
- Handler, Chelsea (2010). Chelsea Chelsea Bang Bang. New York: Grand Central Publishing. ISBN 978-0-446-55244-8.
- Handler, Chelsea (2011). Lies That Chelsea Handler Told Me. New York: Grand Central Publishing. ISBN 978-0-446-58471-5.
- Handler, Chelsea (2014). Uganda Be Kidding Me. New York: Grand Central Publishing. ISBN 978-1-4555-9973-8.
- Handler, Chelsea (2019). Life Will Be the Death of Me ...and You Too! New York: Spiegel & Grau. ISBN 9780525511779
- Handler, Chelsea (2025). I'll Have What She's Having New York: The Dial Press. ISBN 9780593596579
