= Losing It (book) =

2008 autobiography by Valerie Bertinelli

Losing It: And Gaining My Life Back One Pound at a Time
- Author: Valerie Bertinelli
- Language: English
- Publisher: Free Press
- Publication date: February 25, 2008
- Publication place: United States
- Media type: Hardcover
- Pages: 288
- ISBN: 978-1-4165-6818-6
- OCLC: 166386955
- Dewey Decimal: 791.4502/8092 B 22
- LC Class: PN2287.B4379 A3 2008

Losing It: And Gaining My Life Back One Pound at a Time is the best-selling autobiography of actress Valerie Bertinelli released on February 25, 2008, by Free Press.

In the memoir, Bertinelli confesses to cocaine use and infidelity. She also writes about her relationship with film director Steven Spielberg and marriage to rock star Eddie Van Halen. In addition to revealing her past indiscretions, the autobiography focuses on how she became clean, lost weight, and conquered her other personal demons.

Bertinelli promoted the book with an hour on The Oprah Winfrey Show. Losing It spent three weeks at #1 on the adult non-fiction section of the New York Times Best Seller list.
