= I Am Equal =

Photo documentary by Jason Beckett

I Am Equal is a photo documentary created by Jason Beckett and fashion photographer Matt Spencer in late 2009. The project has the stated intention of collecting more than 100,000 individual photos from 175 cities around the world and using them to build one of the largest photo mosaics in history. In 2011, the project launched the official world tour in Sacramento, California. The project is estimated to take more than 7 years to complete and has the ultimate goal of unveiling an 8,000-square-foot (740 m^{2}) mosaic in Washington DC containing all the photos collected during the world tour.

== History ==
The documentary was created by Jason Beckett and fashion photographer Matt Spencer who said the campaign was meant to encourage individuals to get more active in educating, inspiring, and empowering their friends and family to make a positive difference in their communities and the world.

=== The Project ===
Created in Salt Lake City, Utah in late 2009, the campaign was developed in response to the founder's perceptions of a general social apathy prevailing in the world. They built the documentary with the intention of giving participants a reason to talk about the unique issues or causes they support, and to encourage those participants to take an active role in improving their community.

In December 2009, Beckett and Spencer conceptualized the documentary project as a world tour campaign that would visit approximately 25 cities a year for 7 years and capture as many as 100,000 individual photos of people from all walks of life.

Beginning in January 2010, Spencer started taking photos and testing the concept at his studio in Salt Lake City, Utah with only a few dozen photos at a time while Beckett started to build the associated websites and social media pages.

In January 2011, after 8 small events in Utah, the project launched its official world tour in Sacramento, California at The Citizen Hotel.

==== The Photos ====
To participate in the campaign, individuals are encouraged to wear a solid brightly colored shirt and go to a public photo event in their area where a temporary tattoo with the logo "I AM =" is applied to the palm of their hand. They stand in front of the camera with the instructions to have the palm of their hand facing the camera as close to the face as possible, and they may be as creative as they want. The photographer snaps the photo and the entire process takes less than 5 minutes. Two weeks after the photo event, each participant receives an email with instructions on how to find their photo in the online gallery and social networks along with ideas on how to share it with friends and family. Each individual is also invited to share a "PhotoStory" as part of the photo essay project, where participants discuss the unique issues and causes, they support.

==== Broad inclusion ====
The project creators said it is their first priority to ensure that it represents all people, issues, and causes rather than just the popular equality topic of the day. The expressed intention of the campaign is to get participants to speak up and discuss, with friends and family, the humanitarian, civil rights, conservation, and equality issues they support. They point out that through history the conversation of "equality" has had many causal champions such as the Women's Suffragette Movement, the Abolitionist movement, the Women's Rights movement, the Civil Rights, and the Gay & Lesbian movement, so the I Am Equal Photo Documentary was built to connect all of the issues of equality, human rights, civil liberties, and conservation into one massive conversation of mutual respect for all people while uniting individual participants in a common initiative to break a world record.

Some of the issues and causes already represented by individuals participating in the I AM EQUAL Photo Documentary include autism, marriage equality, drug addiction, immigration reform, atheism, religious freedom, teen suicide, Down syndrome, gender equality, racism, poverty, incest rape, gay adoption, deaf/hearing impaired, bigotry, pansexuality, obesity, free speech, senior rights.

==== Photo activism ====
The campaign leverages the popularity of social networks to fuel the viral expansion of the project; participants are encouraged to use their photo on social media networks as a way to initiate conversations about the issue or cause represented by the individual. Some participants have taken their photo beyond the social networks by printing it on business cards or framing it in their house as a way to open a casual dialogue about their participation in the campaign.

The project founders assert that the simple act of sharing the photo or putting it on display may be all that is needed to open new conversations with co-workers, friends, family, and even perfect strangers about the big and small issues that these participants feel are facing the world today. Some participants have suggested that their I AM EQUAL photo has been an effective way to begin a dialogue on weightier human rights issues such as female genital mutilation, sex trafficking, rape incest, polygamy, and many other topics they feel would not normally be discussed in casual conversations.

=== Milestones ===
==== World Tour 2011 (Year 1) ====
In conjunction with Mayor Kevin Johnson's office and coordinating with the local Pride! Center, NAACP, Big Brothers Big Sisters, and the United Way, the photo documentary launched its first official tour stop on January 6, 2011, at The Citizen Hotel in Sacramento, California, the city TIME Magazine voted it to be the most diverse city in America.

The project returned to Salt Lake City and held a general public photo event on February 5, 2011, at The Sheraton Downtown Hotel where an additional 650 photos were added to the documentary collection. The project made its way to Las Vegas, Nevada, in partnership with MGM Resorts International for an event at The New York New York Hotel & Casino on February 19, 2011, where more than 500 resort employees participated in the documentary project along with the then Mayor Oscar Goodman, County Commissioner Chris Giunchigliani, the dance troop The Jabbawockeez, as well as Terry Fator, and the Las Vegas cast of The Lion King at Mandalay Bay. While in Las Vegas, project founder Jason Beckett was invited to discuss the photo documentary project as a speaker at the annual Martin Luther King Jr. Day celebrations, Jazzitudes at UNLV.

The project made its first stop outside the United States in Calgary, Alberta, Canada on May 28, 2011. During this stop, hundreds participated in the project including United States Olympic Gold Medalist, Steve Mesler on behalf of his non-profit organization Classroom Champions. Local service groups and organizations including the United Way of Canada, Child Find Alberta, AIDS Calgary, and the Calgary Scope Society all participated in the documentary project.

Working with the North Texas chapter of Get Equal, the I Am Equal Photo Documentary set up at the Aloft Dallas Hotel and took photos of more than 300 people. Project founder Beckett was invited to address the assembled crowd at the annual North Texas March for Equality on the steps of City Hall as the keynote speaker for the event.

==== World Tour 2012 (Year 2) ====
The project was invited to the University of North Florida as part of their first annual 'Week of One' diversity celebration, created in part as a vehicle to showcase the project and allow students the opportunity to take part in the record-breaking campaign.

In February, the campaign made stops in Raleigh, North Carolina, Knoxville, Tennessee, and Columbus, Ohio. While in Tennessee, the project founders made a detour to stop in the small town of Whitwell to include this community of 1,600 people in the project. The founders wanted to include the people responsible for creating the Children's Holocaust Memorial (Paper Clips Project), created by students at the local middle school who collected more than 11 million paperclips from around the world and placed them into a rail car used to transport Jews, blacks, homosexuals, Jehova's Witnesses, and other people to concentration camps. The original teacher from the project, David Alan Smith, as well as the local elected and school officials took part in the campaign by getting their photo taken at the City Hall Court Room.

== Project creators ==
=== Jason Beckett ===
Jason Beckett is a marketing and brand developer who has created and managed multimillion-dollar campaigns for authors, manufactures, gurus, and corporations across the United States. He was the Director of Original Programming for Turner Media, writer/producer for Dream Big Productions, and programming developer for Primedia.

Beckett created the I Am Equal project and built the record-breaking I Am Equal Photo Documentary with Matt Spencer as a way to highlight and showcase the unique human rights and social issues that unite the human family.

To further support the photo documentary project and associated foundation, Beckett also produced the 'Live for Love' Charity mini album and donated all the proceeds to the campaign. The album includes the original songs Live for Love and Will You Stand By, along with a cover of the Elton John classic, 'The Last Song.'

=== Matt Spencer ===
Matt Spencer is a commercial fashion photographer who works with Fortune 500 companies and various international publications. Publications including Women's Fitness Magazine, Seventeen Magazine, V.I.P. Zone, M the Book, Launchpad Magazine, PDN have featured his work. Some campaign members have said that his photographic style become as recognizable as the campaign logo itself.

== World tour ==
After collecting nearly 500 photos in the testing phase of the documentary project, organizers began planning the first "official" tour event in Sacramento, California, with the help of former NBA All Star and current Sacramento City Mayor, Kevin Johnson. Working closely with his entire staff, the details were set in place to open the official I Am Equal Photo Documentary world tour at The Citizen Hotel, across the street from City Hall and the California State Capital. The documentary creators have said that they intend to visit between 20 and 25 cities each year for at least 7 years in order to collect their target goal of more than 100,000 individual photos.
