= Johns Hopkins Film Festival =

Film festival

The Johns Hopkins Film Festival is an international film festival held annually at the Johns Hopkins University. Established in 1997, the festival aims to show independent works from local and international filmmakers. Attendees have included Hopkins alumni John Astin and Wes Craven, as well as Baltimore directors such as Barry Michael Cooper. The festival is usually held on the last weekend of April and is run by the Johns Hopkins Film Society, a campus student group.

The festival was founded in 1997 by Gil Jawetz, Teddy Chao, and the rest of the Johns Hopkins Film Society. With much guidance from English department chair Jerome Christensen and Writing Seminars Chair Mark Crispin Miller, the Johns Hopkins Film Society decided to put together a submission-oriented, student-run film festival to go along with their journal Frame of Reference.
