= Uganda Be Kidding Me: Live =

- Starring: Chelsea Handler
- Country of origin: United States
- Original language: English

Production
- Running time: 72 minutes

Original release
- Network: Netflix
- Release: October 10, 2014

Uganda Be Kidding Me: Live is a Netflix stand-up comedy special by Chelsea Handler in support of her New York Times Best-Selling book of the same name. It was filmed in Chicago at the Harris Theater on June 20, and released on Netflix on October 10, 2014.
