= Chelsea Chelsea Bang Bang =

2010 book by Chelsea Handler

- Jacket of Chelsea Chelsea Bang Bang.
- Author: Chelsea Handler
- Language: English
- Genre: Creative nonfiction
- Publisher: Grand Central Publishing
- Publication date: March 2010
- Publication place: United States
- Media type: Print (hardcover)
- Pages: 256 pp (first edition)
- ISBN: 978-0446552448
- LC Class: PN6231.W6H27 2010
- Preceded by: Are You There Vodka? It's Me, Chelsea
- Followed by: Lies That Chelsea Handler Told Me

Chelsea Chelsea Bang Bang is a book by Chelsea Handler that was published in March 2010.

== Synopsis ==
The book consists of humorous essays written by Chelsea about her various life experiences. The essays are often blatantly vulgar, much like the ones in Handler's previous two published books.

== Essays ==
The chapters (essays) in the book are as follows:

1. "The Feeling"
2. "When Life Hands You Lemons, Squeeze Them Into Your Vodka"
3. "Grey Gardens"
4. "Dudley"
5. "Wedding Chopper"
6. "Water Olympics"
7. "Black-on-Black Crime"
8. "Dear Asshole"
9. "The Suspect"
10. "Chunk"
11. "Deep Thoughts by Chelsea Handy"

== Sales and recognition ==
Chelsea Chelsea Bang Bang hit Number 1 on the New York Times Nonfiction Hardback Bestseller list on March 21, 2010. That same week, her previous books, 'Are You There, Vodka? It's Me, Chelsea' and 'My Horizontal Life: A Collection of One Night Stands", hit numbers 2 and 3 on the paperback list.

=== Tour ===
In 2010, Handler embarked on a tour to promote the book. For the tour, Handler switched her sponsor from Grey Goose to Belvedere Vodka, joking that Belvedere is the healthier option.
