= Are You There, Vodka? It's Me, Chelsea =

2008 book by Chelsea Handler

- First edition cover
- Author: Chelsea Handler
- Cover artist: Michael Nagin (design); Zach Cordner (photo)
- Language: English
- Genre: Memoir; comedy
- Published: April 22, 2008
- Publisher: Simon Spotlight Entertainment
- Publication place: United States
- Media type: Hardcover
- Pages: 272
- ISBN: 978-1-4169-5412-5
- OCLC: 173640867
- Dewey Decimal: 306.7092 22
- LC Class: HQ801 .H3193 2008
- Preceded by: My Horizontal Life: A Collection of One-Night Stands
- Followed by: Chelsea Chelsea Bang Bang

Are You There, Vodka? It's Me, Chelsea is a 2008 book by Chelsea Handler, published on April 22, 2008, by Simon Spotlight Entertainment. The book is a collection of humorous and mostly autobiographical essays about her life. Handler has stated in an interview with Barnes & Noble that she waited to write a book with such stories with no concrete theme and wrote My Horizontal Life: A Collection of One-Night Stands with the theme of one-night stands to get her enough popularity for this sort of book to do well. The title is satirically modeled after the 1970 Judy Blume novel Are You There God? It's Me, Margaret. Following the release of Vodka, sales of her first book rocketed; the two titles have sold a combined 1.7 million copies, according to Nielsen BookScan and have both topped several bestseller lists.

In February 2011, a television pilot for NBC loosely based on the book was announced, starring Laura Prepon as Chelsea. The pilot was ordered to series on May 13, 2011, for the 2011–12 television season, with its title shortened to Are You There, Chelsea? The series premiered on NBC on January 11, 2012, and was cancelled on May 11, 2012, after one season.

== Plots ==
=== Blacklisted ===
In order to impress a fifth grade boy and to gain the respect of the girls at her school, Chelsea concocts a tall tale in which she is co-starring in a movie with Goldie Hawn. The lie quickly gets blown out of proportion, and things get even more complicated when Chelsea's father forces her to reveal the truth.

=== Chelsea in Charge ===
During her summer vacation on Martha's Vineyard, Chelsea pretends to be older than she is so that parents would allow her to babysit for money. After a few attempts, she gains renown as a babysitter, and the calls come pouring in. One of her calls, however is to look after a fourteen-year-old (even though Chelsea is really only twelve) and his "72-month-old" brother. She accepts, and chaos ensues.

=== Prison Break ===
Chelsea gets pulled over after drinking and driving, and is arrested and sent to the Sybil Brand Institute.

=== Bladder Stones ===
Chelsea returns home to find her father having urinary issues, conning people via his used car company and Chelsea's books.

=== Big Red ===
Chelsea somehow finds herself falling for a red head, even though she does not have an affinity for men of that hair color.

=== Dining in the Dark ===
Chelsea is asked to go to London for the UK release of her book, and she decides to bring her recently single and unemployed friend along. Her friend makes reservations for the both of them at a restaurant where one dines completely in the dark, and when they arrive, they realize they have gotten more than they bargained for. After an unpleasant experience at the restaurant, they duck out to a nearby pub, where they meet what they assume to be a former rock star.

=== Dim Sum and Then Some ===
Chelsea and a friend retreat to a poor part of town in hopes of finding a massage place with openings. They come across a small shack operated by an Asian woman, and Chelsea assumes that it is a brothel. After a few minutes of a less than satisfactory massage, Chelsea complains, and trouble ensues.

=== Barking Up the Wrong Tree ===
Chelsea and her Persian boyfriend get stuck dog sitting for their friends. After they have sex on their friends' bed, her boyfriend lies naked watching TV and one of the friends' dogs comes up and begins licking his penis. Chelsea becomes very uneasy about it. They go to a party later and her Persian boyfriend holds that same dog in his arms the entire time. Later, they go to eat at his parents’ home and Chelsea cannot get over the fact that his mother is rude and looks like a man. They break up. She later sees him with the same type of dog that licked his penis and a new girlfriend, and alludes to the penis licking incident before leaving happily.

=== Re-Gift ===
Chelsea finds herself stuck going to the birthday party of someone she barely knows, and has no choice but to re-gift a used, but hardly played, board game. She also finds herself bartending at the dinner because the restaurant lacks one of her requirements: a full bar.

=== Jumped ===
Chelsea decides she needs to lose weight before her birthday and signs up for a private kickboxing class. After losing enough weight to be proud, she decides to treat herself and pigs out on a mountain of junk food from Starbucks. After eating it all at her apartment, and taking out her energy with cleaning, she falls asleep and wakes up exhausted. Her friend calls and yells at her for not picking her up at the airport and Chelsea leaves to get her. On the way, she nearly drives into a group of fourteen-year-old girls, one of whom calls her a cunt. She gets out to berate them, and they attack her.

=== Mini Me ===
Chelsea meets a little person who looks and acts a lot like her and they become instant friends. Soon she learns that her friend needs her help.

=== Costa Rica ===
Chelsea gets dragged into going on vacation in Costa Rica with her father. The entire time she keeps emailing her brothers and sisters to get them to come and help her.
