= Audition: A Memoir =

Book by Barbara Walters

- Cover of Audition: A Memoir
- Author: Barbara Walters
- Language: English
- Publisher: Knopf
- Publication date: May 6, 2008
- Publication place: United States
- Media type: Print (Hardcover)
- Pages: 624
- ISBN: 978-0-307-26646-0
- OCLC: 176951785
- Dewey Decimal: 070.92 B 22
- LC Class: PN4874.W285 A3 2008

Audition: A Memoir is a 2008 autobiography by American journalist and television personality Barbara Walters. The book was published on May 6, 2008, by Knopf. Audition provides a relatively full autobiography of Walters, spanning from her childhood to recent interviews. Walters discusses her work and personal life, confessing to an affair with Senator Edward W. Brooke and describing her relationship with Alan Greenspan.

The release of Audition was covered by major media outlets. Walters went on a promotional tour talking about the book, including an hour on The Oprah Winfrey Show and an interview with The New York Times. ABC broadcast an hour-long special hosted by Charlie Gibson on May 7, 2008, to celebrate the book's release. The special, called Audition: Barbara Walters’ Journey, attracted 7.4 million viewers.

Preceded by The Revolution by Ron Paul	#1 The New York Times Best Seller Non-Fiction; May 25, 2008 – July 8, 2008	Succeeded by What Happened by Scott McClellan
