= Uganda Be Kidding Me =

2014 book

- Author: Chelsea Handler
- Language: English
- Genre: Humor
- Published: 2014
- Publisher: Grand Central Publishing
- Publication place: United States
- Pages: 248 pages
- ISBN: 978-1-455-59973-8

Uganda Be Kidding Me is 2014 humor book written by Chelsea Handler about her travels in Africa that was later adapted into a Netflix stand-up comedy special, Uganda Be Kidding Me: Live.

== Critical reception ==
Publishers Weekly wrote, "Handler takes her raunchy personality along with as she travels the globe, relaying to readers a variety of adventures laced with alcohol, over-the-top behavior, kooky friends and relatives, and a fair share of scatological humor."
