= List of programs broadcast by E! =

E! logo (2012–present)

This is a list of television programs formerly and currently broadcast by the cable television channel E! in the United States.

== Current programming ==
=== Upcoming ===
- The Golden Life (2026)

=== Current ===
- Cocktail Wars (2026)

=== Acquired ===
- 9-1-1
- NCIS: Los Angeles
- Two and a Half Men
- How I Met Your Mother
- The Goldbergs

== Former programming ==
=== 1990s ===
- The Anthony Rodriguez Show

==== 1990 ====
- The Dick Tracy Show
- Inside Word with Michael Castner
- TV's Bloopers & Practical Jokes

==== 1991 ====
- One Day at a Time
- Coming Attractions
- E! Behind the Scenes
- E! News
- Talk Soup

==== 1993 ====
- Pure Soap

==== 1994 ====
- Howard Stern

==== 1995 ====
- Dear John
- The Gossip Show
- Night Stand with Dick Dietrick
- Melrose Place

==== 1997 ====
- Fashion Emergency
- The Michael Essany Show
- Wild On!

==== 1998 ====
- Celebrity Profile
- Mysteries and Scandals
- Boston March

==== 1999 ====
- Rachel Ashwell's Shabby Chic
- Search Party

=== 2000s ===
==== 2001 ====
- Revealed with Jules Asner

==== 2002 ====
- The Anna Nicole Show
- Daly/Nightly
- Star Dates

==== 2003 ====
- Celebrities Uncensored
- It's Good to Be...
- Love Chain
- Totally Outrageous Behavior

==== 2004 ====
- Dr. 90210
- Life is Great with Brooke Burke
- Love Is in the Heir
- Scream Play

==== 2005 ====
- G-Spot
- E! Hollywood Hold'em
- The Entertainer starring Wayne Newton
- Fight for Fame
- Filthy Rich: Cattle Drive
- The Gastineau Girls
- The Girls Next Door
- Kill Reality
- Party @ The Palms
- Taradise

==== 2006 ====
- #1 Single
- 7 Deadly Hollywood Sins
- Child Star Confidential
- The Daily 10
- House of Carters
- Love Ride
- The Simple Life

==== 2007 ====
- Boulevard of Broken Dreams
- Chelsea Lately
- Katie & Peter
- Keeping Up with the Kardashians
- Paradise City
- Saturday Night Live
- Snoop Dogg's Father Hood
- Starveillance
- Sunset Tan
- Tales from the Hoff
- Wildest Date Show Moments 2

==== 2008 ====
- Denise Richards: It's Complicated
- Living Lohan
- Party Monsters Cabo
- Pam: Girl on the Loose!
- Pop Fiction

==== 2009 ====
- Candy Girls
- Kendra
- Leave It to Lamas
- Reality Hell

=== 2010s ===
==== 2010 ====
- Bridalplasty
- E! Investigates
- Fashion Police
- The Girls Next Door: The Bunny House
- Holly's World
- Married to Rock
- Pretty Wild
- The Spin Crowd
- What's Eating You

==== 2011 ====
- After Lately
- The Dance Scene
- Dirty Soap
- Ice Loves Coco
- Khloé & Lamar
- Kourtney and Kim Take New York
- Scouted

==== 2012 ====
- A-List Listings
- Love You, Mean It with Whitney Cummings
- Married to Jonas
- Mrs. Eastwood & Company
- Opening Act

==== 2013 ====
- Burning Love
- Chasing the Saturdays
- The Drama Queen
- Eric & Jessie: Game On
- Hello Ross
- Kourtney and Kim Take Miami
- Live from E!
- Party On
- Playing with Fire
- Pop Innovators
- The Soup Investigates
- Total Divas
- The Wanted Life
- What Would Ryan Lochte Do?

==== 2014 ====
- Botched
- Escape Club
- The Fabulist
- Giuliana and Bill
- House of DVF
- Kourtney and Khloé Take The Hamptons
- Rich Kids of Beverly Hills
- Secret Societies Of Hollywood
- Untold with Maria Menounos

==== 2015 ====
- The Comment Section
- Christina Milian Turned Up
- Dash Dolls
- Good Work
- The Grace Helbig Show
- Hollywood Cycle
- Hollywood Medium with Tyler Henry
- I Am Cait
- New Money
- Sex with Brody
- Stewarts & Hamiltons
- WAGS
- We Have Issues
- Who Wore It Better

==== 2016 ====
- Botched by Nature
- Catching Kelce
- EJNYC
- Famously Single
- Hollywood & Football
- Just Jillian
- L.A. Clippers Dance Squad
- Mariah's World
- Rob & Chyna
- Total Bellas
- WAGS Miami

==== 2017 ====
- Daily Pop
- Life of Kylie
- The Platinum Life
- Revenge Body with Khloé Kardashian
- Second Wives Club
- So Cosmo
- What Happens at The Abbey

==== 2018 ====
- Ashlee+Evan
- Busy Tonight
- Citizen Rose
- LadyGang
- Model Squad
- Nightly Pop
- Very Cavallari
- WAGS Atlanta

==== 2019 ====
- Dating #NoFilter
- E! True Hollywood Story
- Flip It Like Disick
- In the Room
- Relatively Nat & Liv

=== 2020s ===
==== 2020 ====
- 10 Things You Don't Know
- Celebrity Call Center
- Celebrity Game Face
- The Funny Dance Show
- Meet the Frasers
- Pop of the Morning

==== 2021 ====
- Clash of the Cover Bands
- For Real: The Story of Reality TV
- Jason Biggs' Cash at Your Door
- Overserved with Lisa Vanderpump
- Reunion Road Trip
- We Got Love: Teyana & Iman

==== 2022 ====
- The Bradshaw Bunch
- Celebrity Beef
- Growing Up Chrisley
- Mathis Family Matters
- If We're Being Honest With Laverne Cox
- Raising a F***ing Star
- Relatively Famous: Ranch Rules
- Welcome Home Nikki Glaser?

==== 2023 ====
- Black Pop: Celebrating the Power of Black Culture
- Celebrity Prank Wars
- House of Villains
- Nikki Bella Says I Do
- Trippin' with Anthony Anderson and Mama Doris

==== 2024 ====
- OMG Fashun

==== 2025 ====
- Kimora: Back in the Fab Lane

==== 2026 ====
- Dirty Rotten Scandals
- Plastic Surgery Rewind

=== Scripted ===
- The Royals (2015-2018)
- The Arrangement (2017-2018)

=== Acquired ===
- Charmed
- Las Vegas
- Saved by the Bell
- Don't Be Tardy
- Paris in Love
- Love Island
- Modern Family
- Sex and the City
- Last Man Standing
- The Office
