= E! (Australia and New Zealand) =

Australian and New Zealand television channel

- Country: Australia

Programming
- Language: English
- Picture format: 576i (SDTV)

Ownership
- Owner: NBCUniversal International Networks
- Sister channels: Bravo; CNBC; Universal TV; 13th Street

History
- Launched: April 2002; 24 years ago (New Zealand); 2004; 22 years ago (Australia)
- Closed: 15 January 2023; 3 years ago (New Zealand); 31 January 2023; 3 years ago (Australia)

E! was an Australian and New Zealand pay television channel, owned by NBCUniversal International Networks. Much like its American counterpart it featured entertainment-related programming, reality television and Hollywood news. It was available, at the time of closure, through the Foxtel and FetchTV platforms in Australia. It was available on the Sky platform in New Zealand, from April 2002 until 15 January 2023. It was also available on the Austar service prior to 2012. In 2014, it became available on Australian streaming service Foxtel Play.

NBCUIN signed a content agreement with Seven West Media in the Australian spring of 2022, which includes the launch of a new terrestrial channel, 7Bravo on 15 January 2023, that now includes E! content; with this, the previous content agreement with Foxtel was not renewed, and E! closed at 5:59 a.m. local time on 1 February 2023, which is considered the last minute of the 31 January broadcast day.

== History ==
E! was relaunched in 2012, shortly after the American version of E! did the same rebrand, which included a revised logo. Kim Kardashian visited Australia to promote the rebranding.

The channel issued a casting call for journalists to become the face of E! Australia, and report on local entertainment news. The contest was won by Ksenija Lukich.

== Programming ==
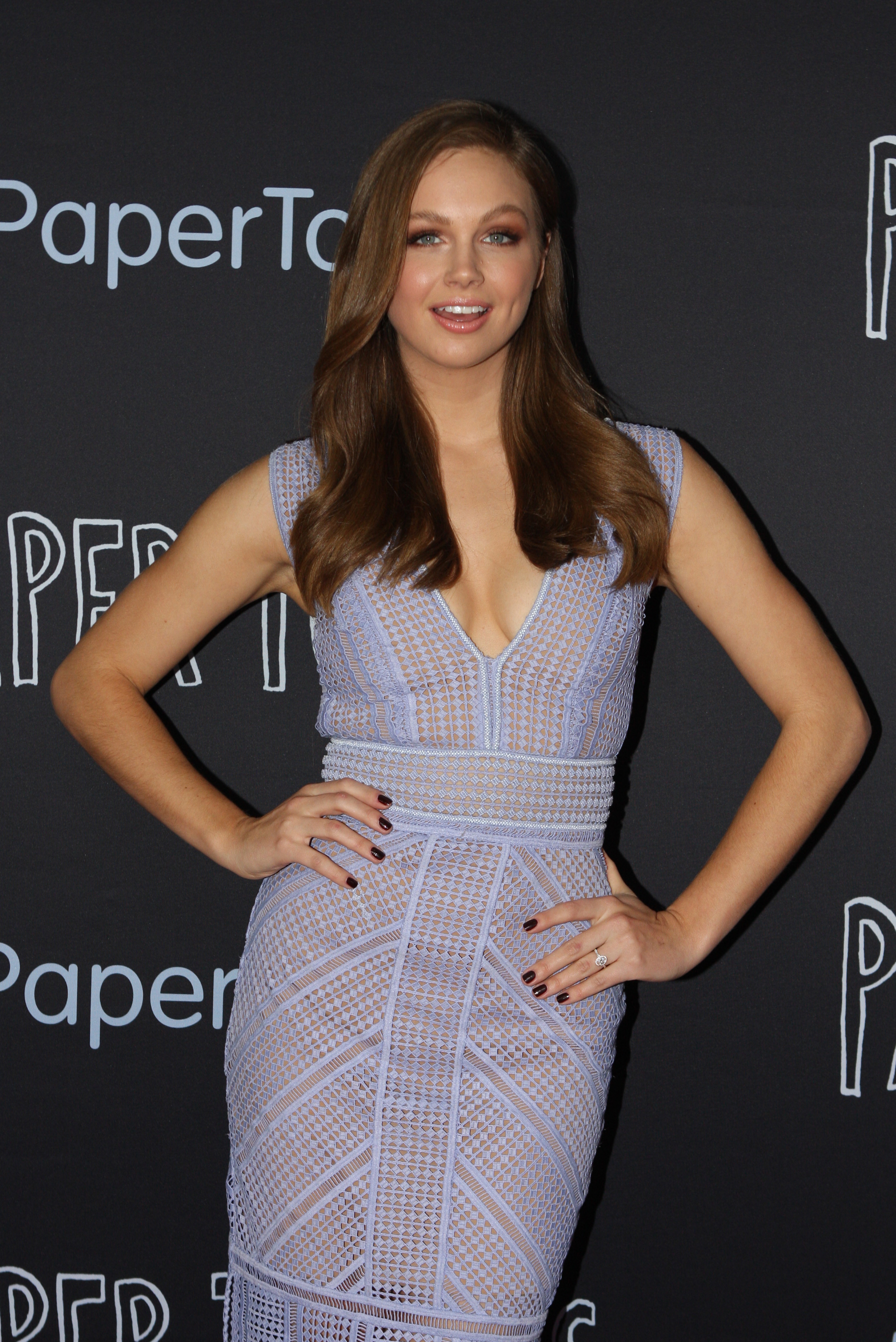
Ksenija Lukich, the winner of E! Host Australia Search.

=== Original local programming ===
- Fashion Bloggers (season 2 only, season 1 aired on sister channel Style Network)
- The Hype (starts October 17, 2015)

=== Acquired programming from American E! ===
- Botched
- Botched by Nature
- Christina Milian Turned Up
- Dash Dolls
- E! True Hollywood Story
- Famously Single
- Fashion Police
- Good Work
- Hollywood Cycle
- I Am Cait
- Keeping Up with the Kardashians
- Mariah's World
- New Money
- Rich Kids of Beverly Hills
- Sex with Brody
- Stewarts and Hamiltons
- The Soup
- The Grace Helbig Show
- Total Bellas
- Total Divas
- WAGS
- We Have Issues

=== Acquired programming from other distributors ===
- Burning Love

=== Former programming ===
- Chasing the Saturdays
- Chelsea Lately
- E! Host Australia Search
- Hello Ross
- House of Carters
- Joan & Melissa: Joan Knows Best?
- Kimora: Life in the Fab Lane
- Love You, Mean It with Whitney Cummings
- Opening Act
- Sunset Tan
- The Soup Investigates
- The Wanted Life
- What Would Ryan Lochte Do?
