= Drugstore June =

2024 film directed by Nicholaus Goossen

- Theatrical release poster
- Directed by: Nicholaus Goossen
- Written by: Nicholaus Goossen; Esther Povitsky
- Produced by: Jordan Ellner; Nicholaus Goossen; Robert Schwartzman
- Starring: Esther Povitsky; Bobby Lee; Beverly D'Angelo; James Remar; Brandon Wardell; Danny Griffin; Haley Joel Osment; Matt Walsh; Patricia Williams; Miranda Cosgrove; Al Madrigal
- Cinematography: Sherri Kauk
- Edited by: Nicholaus Goossen
- Music by: Alex Geringas
- Production companies: All Things Comedy; Paper Anvil
- Distributed by: Utopia; Shout! Studios
- Release dates: February 23, 2024 (Limited); March 8, 2024
- Running time: 91 minutes
- Country: United States
- Language: English
- Box office: $18,665

Drugstore June is a 2024 American crime comedy film co-produced, directed, and edited by Nicholaus Goossen. The film stars Esther Povitsky in her first starring role, who co-penned the script with Goossen. Produced by Paper Anvil and Bill Burr's All Things Comedy, the film was distributed by Utopia and Shout! Studios.

== Plot ==
June works at her local pharmacy, but also dabbles with being an influencer on social media. While working at the pharmacy one day, her ex-boyfriend Davey asks her to stop stalking him, as he is now engaged to his fiancée Kelly. June also bumps into a store customer Owen who shares her taste for Twix bars.

At home, June's mom worries if something is wrong with June's younger brother Jonathan, since he's on the computer a lot. Their dad has a gambling problem for which he has been arrested before. Mom makes June pay a visit to Dr. Weisman, her therapist, who listens to her past boyfriends and tries to convince her to get vaccinated against HPV.

Arriving one morning at the pharmacy for her work, June finds the whole place damaged and in disarray, and learns that a burglary has taken place. June and the owner of the pharmacy, Bill, are both questioned with regards to their whereabouts. The police take June to the police station and interrogate her further, explaining the seriousness of the situation as a lot of controlled substances have been stolen from the pharmacy.

Back home, June decides to investigate into the pharmacy burglary herself. She makes a list of suspects: Davey, Kelly, Jonathan, Bill, Dad. Later, she goes to the pharmacy to take photos of the crime scene, just as Bill too comes there and expresses his concern that the store insurance won't cover the burglary until his name is fully cleared by the police.

June goes to the Dante's night club, where her dad regularly indulges in gambling. There she talks to a man called Crawford about the pharmacy robbery, who directs her to a weed store for further enquiry. While June is questioning the weed store workers about the pharmacy robbery, two thieves armed with guns suddenly appear and demand money from the cash register. One of the robbers has a tattoo on his hand that June recognizes, and she yells out his name: "Owen". Shocked that she knows the identity of one the burglars, they kidnap her and take her to their hideout. Owen and June spend some time chatting, until the police raid the hideout and arrest everyone, including June. At the police station, June's involvement in the second burglary is under scrutiny, as June is now a common denominator for both the pharmacy and weed store burglaries.

After June's parents pick her up from jail, she is back at the pharmacy and discovers that Bill's insurance covered the theft. He thanks her for attempting to solve the crime. However, Owen is in prison for his role in the weed store burglary.

In a casual conversation with June, her mom remarks that Jonathan is not a stooge but really very clever. The truth then dawns on June, who immediately goes to her brother's room and confronts him about committing the pharmacy robbery, because two medications stolen were Xanax and Adderall, which he might be interested in. Although initially denying anything to do with the pharmacy robbery, Jonathan finally confesses to the crime because he needed the Herpes drug Valtrex, implying that he has had sex. Having cracked the case, June promises she wouldn't tell mom and dad, but blackmails Jonathan into being her servant for a year.

As a victory treat for solving the pharmacy burglary case, June enjoys a cupcake.

== Cast ==
- Esther Povitsky as June
- Bobby Lee as Bill, June's boss at the pharmacy
- Beverly D'Angelo as Marla, June's mother
- James Remar as Arnold, June's gambling addict father
- Brandon Wardell as Jonathan, June's younger brother
- Danny Griffin as Owen
- Haley Joel Osment as Davey, June's ex-boyfriend
- Miranda Cosgrove as Kelly, Davey's fiancé
- Al Madrigal as Detective David Foltz
- Jackie Sandler as Detective Justine Piazzo
- Bill Burr as Dr. Weisman
- Trevor Wallace as Gary, the owner of a local dispensary
- Bhad Bhabie as Jenny
- Nic Nemeth as Delivery Man
- Matt Walsh as Crawford
- Patricia "Ms. Pat" Williams as Nicole

== Production ==
Director Nicholaus Goossen and comedienne Esther Povitsky have been friends for years, having worked together on many projects for Comedy Central, including her first comedy special Esther Povitsky: Hot For My Name. After working together for so long, they decided to develop a comedy vehicle for her to star in. The project first began in 2017, when it was originally conceived as a web series for ABC Digital. But when the site went defunct, they thought about continuing the series, but Povitsky's other show Alone Together was picked up for a second season, so the two reworked the project into a feature film. The script was finished in 2020.

=== Filming ===
When describing the look of the movie, cinematographer Sherri Kauk described it as "Ferris Bueller's Day Off with all the woke, millennial, modern twists". Filming took 19 days and was shot around the Los Angeles area.

== Release ==
The film had a limited theatrical release on February 23, 2024. The film premiered on digital on March 8, 2024.

== Reception ==
On the review aggregator website Rotten Tomatoes, Drugstore June has an approval rating of 55% based on 11 reviews, with an average rating of 6.1/10. Michael Cieply of Deadline Hollywood gave the film a brief positive review, calling it a "It's small, funny, and lands smack in the middle of a favorite genre: Off-center charmer turns world upside down. You know, Bringing Up Baby, What's Up, Doc?, Clueless, that sort of thing. Esther Povitsky is the charmer, Nick Goossen the director, and both of them wrote it".
