= The Hype (2015 TV series) =

- Genre: News magazine
- Starring: Ksenija Lukich; Dominic Bowden
- Countries of origin: Australia; New Zealand
- Original language: English
- No. of seasons: 1

Production
- Executive producer: Tess Marshall
- Camera setup: Multiple
- Production company: Oxygen360

Original release
- Network: E!
- Release: 17 October 2015 – 2016

The Hype is a news magazine television series for the Australian and New Zealand audience on E! Australia and New Zealand produced by Oxygen360 Sydney. It premiered on 17 October 2015 at 5:30pm and 10:30pm. It is co-hosted by Dominic Bowden from New Zealand and Ksenija Lukich from Australia.

The weekly program features celebrity, fashion and entertainment news. The series is the first full-length weekly entertainment programme from E! designed for the Australian and New Zealand regions, and the second local commission after Fashion Bloggers.
