= Annie Lederman =

American comedian (born 1983)

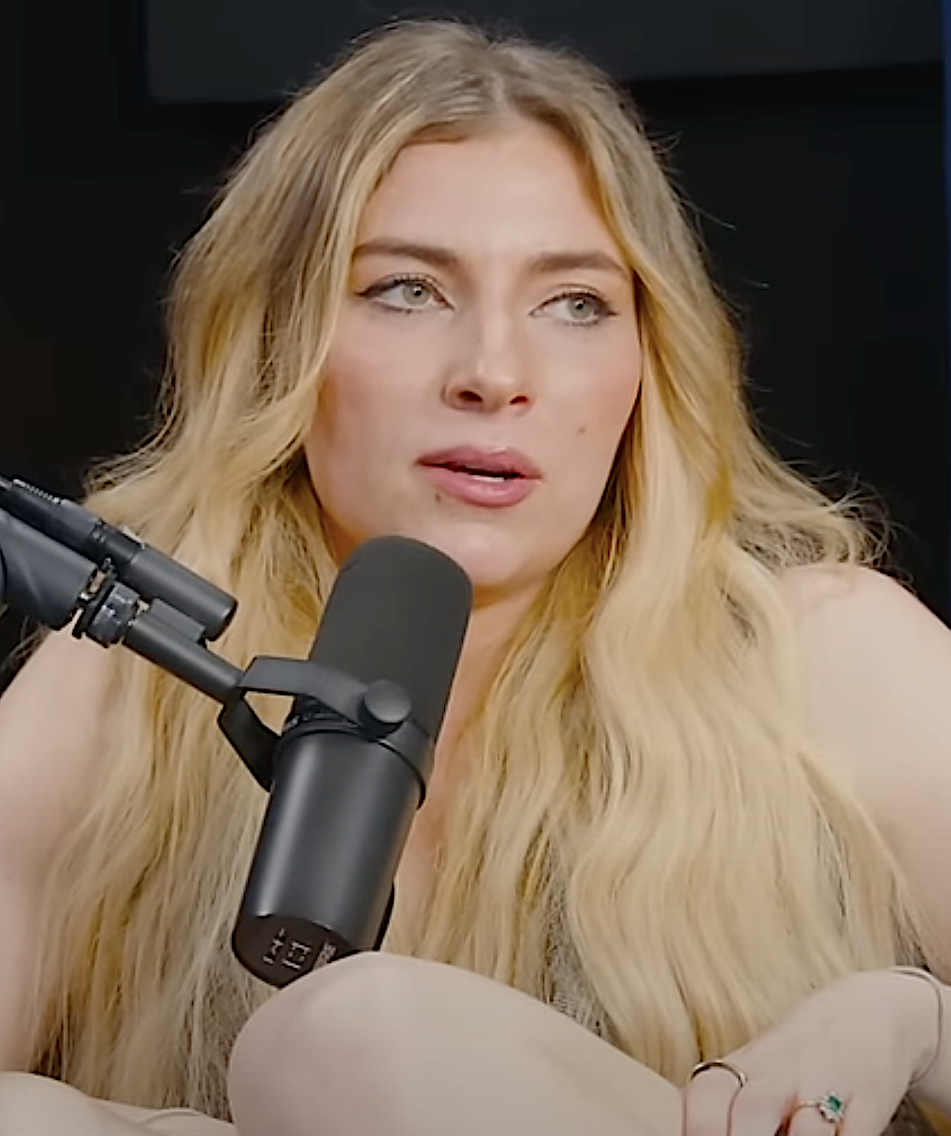
- Lederman in 2025
- Born: July 20, 1983 (age 42); Philadelphia, Pennsylvania, U.S.
- Education: College of Santa Fe (B.A.)
- Years active: 2009–present

Comedy career
- Medium: Stand-up; podcast; television
- Genre: Observational comedy

Annie Lederman (/ˈlɛdərmən/; born July 20, 1983) is an American stand-up comedian and podcast host. Her comedy has often referred to her troubled past, including her struggle with alcoholism in her teenage and young adult years. Born in Philadelphia, Lederman attended the College of Santa Fe where she studied art, before relocating to New York City to pursue a comedy career.

Lederman appeared on the MTV series Girl Code and hosted the E! shows We Have Issues and Chelsea Lately, as well as @midnight. She is also known as the voice of Cheryl Fawkes in the Rockstar video game Grand Theft Auto V. Lederman has occasionally worked as an actress, appearing in supporting roles in the comedy film The Long Dumb Road (2018) and the slasher film Terrifier 3 (2024).

Since 2019, Lederman has hosted her own podcast, AnnieWood (originally titled Meanspiration). Between 2021 and 2024, she was a co-host of the podcast Trash Tuesday with Esther Povitsky and Khalyla Khun.

== Early life and education ==
Lederman was born in Philadelphia to Abby and Scotty Lederman, shortly after midnight on July 20, 1983. (Note: "Lederman explains on WTF with Marc Maron that she and her fraternal twin brother were born July 20 and July 19, respectively; she was born shortly after midnight on July 20.") Her fraternal twin brother, Max, was born minutes before her, on July 19. She is of Scottish, Irish, German, and Jewish ancestry. Lederman's father worked as a treasurer at the University of Pennsylvania, while her mother did social service work. Lederman was raised a Quaker and attended a Quaker school for her early education.

During her teenage years, Lederman trained to be a Junior Olympic swimmer, but gave up the sport after sustaining a foot injury in a car accident caused by a drunk driver. She subsequently studied at The Crefeld School and was sexually assaulted by a male teacher from the school. The incident led to a trial in which Lederman and another female student testified against him. She subsequently became involved with numerous troubled peers who dealt drugs and participated in other criminal activities. After graduating from high school at sixteen, Lederman spent the following year performing service work, first doing dolphin training in Hawaii before working in Central America for a nonprofit organization helping underprivileged children. She subsequently returned to the United States and worked as a camp counselor for Easterseals, as well as working at organizations helping children with disabilities such as cerebral palsy and spina bifida.

After spending a year doing service work, Lederman enrolled at The College of Santa Fe in Santa Fe, New Mexico, where she intermittently took classes for eight years, majoring in art and counseling. While attending college, Lederman developed a drinking problem, and suffered numerous blackout incidents, one of which included her crashing on a motor scooter and suffering serious injuries. The college went out of business and closed two weeks after Lederman's graduation.

== Career ==
In 2009, Lederman relocated to New York City to pursue a career in comedy, and became sober. Lederman created the YouTube channel Sausage Party Presents with video artist Abbey Luck in 2011. Between 2012 and 2014, she was a regular panelist on the E! series Chelsea Lately.

In 2013, Lederman provided the voice of Cheryl in the Rockstar video game Grand Theft Auto V. In 2015, she appeared on the short-lived comedy series We Have Issues. Lederman performed a standup set on the Comedy Central series This Is Not Happening, in a segment titled "Camp Crush", which was released on YouTube on April 5, 2016.

In 2018, her comedy routine about dental floss was widely shared on internet and social media platforms. The same year, she had a minor role in The Long Dumb Road. She enjoys making jokes on social media as well as stand-up, and believes it is easier to make one person laugh at a single joke than sustain a whole audience for an extended period.

Lederman started a podcast, Meanspiration, in 2019.

On February 16, 2021, Lederman, Khalyla Kuhn, and Esther Povitsky launched Trash Tuesday, which they describe on their YouTube channel page as: "It's a podcast. It's a show. It's comedy. It's drama. It's everything you want it to be and more."

On November 28, 2022, Lederman relaunched her Meanspiration podcast under the name AnnieWood. At the end of Trash Tuesday episode no. 160, Lederman announced she would no longer be a part of the podcast, opting instead to focus on her own podcast and upcoming projects.

In 2024, Lederman appeared in a minor role in Damien Leone's horror film Terrifier 3.

== Filmography ==
=== Film ===
Year	Title	Role	Notes	Ref.
2013	Bert and Arnie's Guide to Friendship	Drunk Girl 2		
2015	Knight Birds	Police Officer	Short film; voice role	
2018	The Long Dumb Road	Monica		
2018	Tasteless	Herself	Documentary	
2024	Terrifier 3	Graven Image Co-Host		

=== Television ===
Year	Title	Role	Notes	Ref.
2012–2014	Chelsea Lately	Herself	15 episodes	
2013	Money From Strangers	Herself	3 episodes	
2013	Adam DeVine's House Party	Herself	Episode: "Front Yard Comedy"	
2014–2017	@midnight	Herself	5 episodes	
2014	Stand Up & Deliver!	Herself	Episode: "Annie Lederman"	
2015	We Have Issues	Herself	4 episodes	
2016	Guy Code vs. Girl Code	Herself	10 episodes	
2016	This Is Not Happening	Herself	Episode: "Camp Crush"	
2019	Those Who Can't	Tampa	Episode: "A Smooth Holiday Coincidence"	
2020	The Comedy Store	Herself	Episode: "Joe Rogan Returns"	

=== Video games ===
Year	Title	Role	Notes	Ref.
2013	Grand Theft Auto V	Cheryl Fawkes	Voice role	

== Podcasts ==
Year	Title	Notes	Ref.
2019–present	AnnieWood	Solo podcast; formerly known as Meanspiration	
2021–2024	Trash Tuesday	Co-hosted with Esther Povitsky and Khalyla Kuhn; formerly known as Bloodbath	

== Sources ==
- Maron, Marc; Lederman, Annie (November 22, 2018). Episode 970. WTF with Marc Maron.
