= Dominic Bowden =

New Zealand television presenter (born 1977)

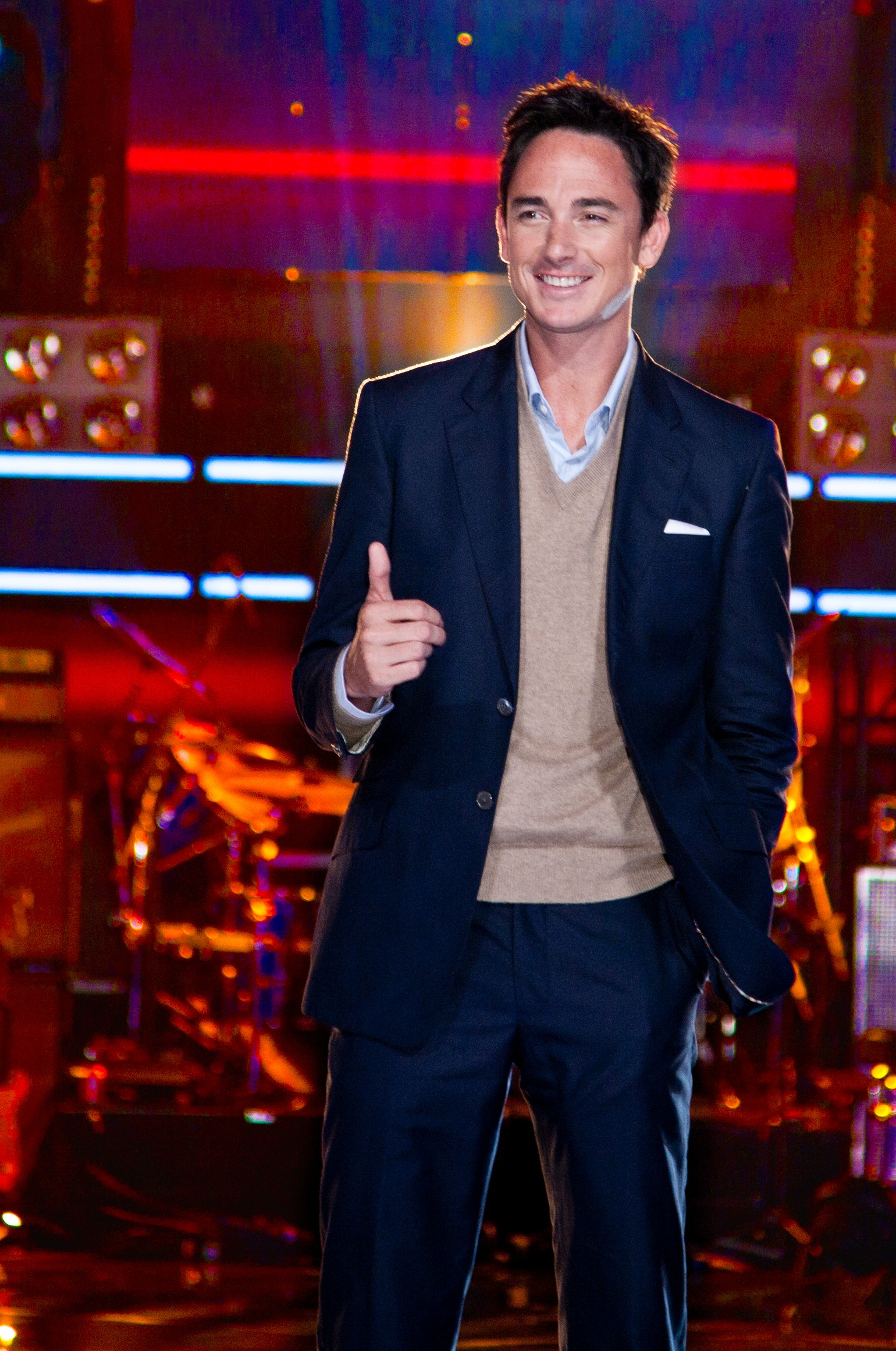
- Born: Dominic Joseph Bowden; 15 December 1977 (age 48); Auckland, New Zealand
- Occupation: Host
- Years active: 1999–present
- Spouse: Claire Robbie (m. 2008; div. 2012)

Dominic Joseph Bowden (born 15 December 1977) is a New Zealand television personality, host and voice actor. He is best known as the host of New Zealand reality series including New Zealand Idol, Dancing with the Stars New Zealand and The X Factor New Zealand. When based in Los Angeles, he hosted the American reality music competition show, The Next Great American Band and as a Hollywood reporter for the Erin Simpson show. Bowden has been called "New Zealand's Ryan Seacrest."

== Early life ==
Bowden was born in Auckland, New Zealand, where he attended Sacred Heart College. His parents are a surveyor and a business manager.

Bowden is a graduate of the Auckland University of Technology, with a Bachelor of Communication Studies, majoring in Television which he achieved in 2000.

== Career ==
After graduating from AUT, Bowden began hosting the popular Saturday morning Children's television programme, Squirt for TVNZ. Bowden then moved into live television on the weekly late-night music show Space. He also traveled the country with British popstar, Robbie Williams for a television special, Robbie Williams: Be Here Now.

Bowden, then moved to Australia and into radio, working as a roving nightly reporter for Austereo, on 2Day FM. Then in 2004, it was announced Bowden would return to New Zealand as the sole host of New Zealand Idol for TVNZ. The Idol series one grand final was watched by a quarter of the country's population.

During this time, for six months Bowden hosted his own nightly radio show for MediaWorks Radio on More FM, called Most Wanted. He also appeared as a contestant on Celebrity Treasure Island: Series 1 and Shock Treatment. As well as hosting the successful game-shows, Are You Smarter than a Fifth Grader and Dare to Win, which had a similar format to Minute to Win It.

Bowden has worked as a reporter for the magazine news show 20/20 (US television series), traveling to Los Angeles to interview Ryan Seacrest for a television special in New Zealand. Shortly after, Bowden signed with Seacrest's then agent William Morris Endeavor and moving to Los Angeles. He was selected by American Idol executive producers Nigel Lythgoe and Ken Warwick to host "The Next Great American Band", which was cancelled after one season.

In 2014, Bowden co-hosted the all access show with Lacey Schwimmer for Dancing with the Stars (U.S. season 19).

Bowden was the sole host of the first and second series of the New Zealand version of X Factor. He was also the host of the revived sixth season of Dancing with the Stars in New Zealand, alongside Sharyn Casey. Both of these shows aired on TV3.

Bowden was the host of The Hype on the E! Network in Australia and New Zealand, alongside Ksenija Lukich. The show first aired October 2015, but is no longer screening on E!.

=== Other work ===
Bowden has co-hosted the televised Qantas Television Awards, New Zealand Music Awards, Girlfriend Model Search, NZ Color Trophy Awards and the Christmas at St Matthews Music Special. He has also been enlisted as a weekly columnist for the New Zealand Woman's Weekly, New Idea and The TV Guide.

He appeared on Shortland Street's 15th anniversary show. He has done voice over work for Bond and Bond and Burger King, as well as appearing in numerous TV commercials, as well as narrator for season 2 of IRT World Deadliest Roads.

As an actor, Bowden appeared in the independent feature The Devil Dared Me To. The film had its world premiere at Austin's South by Southwest Festival and received a standing ovation. In addition to his film role, he had small roles on the television series Hercules: The Legendary Journeys, Xena: Warrior Princess and Shortland Street. He also played himself on Go Girls.

He also interviewed stars for between-movie fillers on Sky Television.

== Personal life ==
Bowden married TV3 reporter Claire Robbie in 2008. The couple separated and divorced in 2012.

During the filming of Bachelor New Zealand, it was revealed that Bowden had briefly dated one of the contestants.

Bowden's family are Catholic, and he attends mass when he is in New Zealand.

== Filmography ==
Year	Title	Role	Note
1996	Squirt	Host	
2000	I Got 2 Babe	Singer	
2000-2001	Space	Host	
2001	Celebrity Treasure Island	Contestant	Was eliminated after first episode.
2004-2012	Close Up	Reporter	
2005-2006	New Zealand Idol	Host	
2006	Shock Treatment	Cast	
2007	Shortland Street - 15th Anniversary Special	Presenter	
2007	Are You Smarter Than A Ten Year Old?	Presenter	
2007	The Next Great American Band	Host	
2008	Dare to Win	Host	
2009-2013	The Erin Simpson Show	Reporter	
2013-2015	The X Factor (NZ)	Host	
2015	Dancing with the Stars	Host	
2015-2016	The Hype	Host	
2017	The Bachelor New Zealand	Host	
