= We Have Issues =

- Genre: Infotainment; Comedy
- Presented by: Julian McCullough; Annie Lederman
- Country of origin: United States
- Original language: English
- No. of seasons: 1
- No. of episodes: 4

Production
- Executive producer: Todd Yasui
- Camera setup: Multiple
- Running time: 22 minutes
- Production company: Wilshire Studios

Original release
- Network: E!
- Release: September 18 – October 9, 2015

Related
- The Soup

We Have Issues is an American comedy infotainment series which aired on E! in the early fall of 2015. The half-hour weekly show is hosted by comedians Julian McCullough and Annie Lederman, who both discuss the biggest pop culture news of the week through the vector of gossip magazines and websites. A weekly guest comedian also appeared.

McCullough and Lederman both appeared together on the late-night series @midnight and separately on various other panel talk shows, including and Chelsea Lately.

== Hosts ==
- Julian McCullough
- Annie Lederman

== Broadcast ==
The show debuted on the E! cable network in the United States on September 18, 2015, after another pop culture news-based series The Soup. Internationally, the series premiered on E! Australia on September 23, 2015.
