= The Chelsea Handler Show =

- Genre: Sketch comedy
- Presented by: Chelsea Handler
- Composer: Steve Mayer
- Country of origin: United States
- Original language: English
- No. of seasons: 1
- No. of episodes: 12

Production
- Executive producers: Jay Blumenfield; Tony Marsh; Mark Schulman; Brent Zacky
- Producers: Chelsea Handler; Tom Brunelle; Chris Franjola; LeeAnn Jennings; Johnny Milord; Jeff Anderson Munkres; David K. Pleger; Dustin Rubin; Brad Wollack
- Running time: 22–24 minutes
- Production company: 3 Arts Entertainment

Original release
- Network: E!
- Release: April 21 – September 8, 2006

The Chelsea Handler Show is an American sketch comedy series that aired on the E! television network. The series starred Chelsea Handler and featured skits that mocked the entertainment industry, spoofed celebrities, television, the elderly, and herself. The show aired Friday nights at 10:30 EST.

== Production ==
The mini-series was green lighted by E! in early 2006 and premiered on April 21, 2006. The cable channel ordered eight episodes of the half-hour project that features Handler, a Tonight Show correspondent and star of Oxygen's Girls Behaving Badly, in taped spoofs, film shorts and field remote pieces, all framed by stand-up segments of her performing before a studio audience. Jay Blumenfield, Tony Marsh, and Mark Schulman served as the show's executive producers.

== Episodes ==
The show originally ordered eight episodes which aired from April 21 to June 9 and was given an additional four episodes starting August 11 to create a 12-episode season. The show finished its run on September 8, 2006.

No.	Title	Original release date
1	"Pilot"	April 21, 2006
Chelsea goes off to find a "gay best friend," and takes a look at a couple's night of an intimate encounter, both of whom have different observations of what happened.
2	"Episode 2"	April 28, 2006
Chelsea sets out to look for a new assistant, quizzes the elderly bowling league on pop culture, and brings "Extreme Makeover" to the homeless.
3	"Episode 3"	May 5, 2006
Chelsea teaches a class in one-night-stand etiquette and competes in a World's Worst Driver competition. Also, former supermodel Janice Dickinson guest stars.
4	"Episode 4"	May 12, 2006
Chelsea talks about pet adoption. She gets dating advice from seniors. Also, the president of her fan club guest stars.
5	"Episode 5"	May 19, 2006
Chelsea acts as a date chaperone. She takes a lie detector with her to work. Also, an Internet clip of someone getting kicked in a delicate area.
6	"Episode 6"	May 26, 2006
Chelsea has a round table dinner with some A-list celebrity look-a-likes and then interviews Gary Coleman while getting a massage.
7	"Episode 7"	June 2, 2006
Chelsea decides to take a pole dancing class, finding out that it's not as easy as it looks. Then she gets a cooking lesson from Mary-Anne of Gilligan's Island. Also, Chelsea gets a taste of strip poker, something she will soon regret.
8	"Episode 8"	August 11, 2006
Chelsea stops by a Hollywood vocal coach to lay down some tracks, which turns into a disaster. She then imagines what some of our most popular TV shows would look like if they aired in foreign countries. Chelsea also goes in for a plastic surgery consultation.
9	"Episode 9"	August 18, 2006
Chelsea crashes a traditional Mexican dinner party -- but her wild ways may get her deported, she also prepares for the possibility of a celebrity scandal. Plus, Chelsea helps two women out on blind dates by giving them each a play-by-play.
10	"Episode 10"	August 25, 2006
Chelsea returns to the retirement home for another pop culture quiz, gets rid of some pent-up anger during a Krav Maga class, and holds auditions for her own house-band.
11	"Episode 11"	September 1, 2006
Chelsea teachers her own one-night-stand etiquette class, and competes as the world's worst driver. Jane Dickinson guest stars.
12	"Episode 12"	September 8, 2006
Chelsea considers pet adoption, then considers dating advice from the elderly. Finally, she discovers that finding a fan-club president isn't as easy as she thought.

== Reception ==
Erika Gonzalez of Rocky Mountain News praised Handler's performance, stating, "some of her best bits come from her awkward interview segments. She revealed a bit too much during a massage session with Gary Coleman and passed out while interviewing Mad TV's Michael McDonald." Sun Sentinel comedy columnist Jeff Rusnak called the show "wickedly uninhibited", writing, "Better suited for HBO than basic cable, last week's episode included Handler baring a breast in one skit and later running over a stuffed dog and a baby doll during a driving competition with an octogenarian and a blind man."

== Successors and spin-offs ==
Chelsea Handler began hosting the late-night comedy show, Chelsea Lately on July 16, 2007, also on E!.
