= Jen Kirkman =

American comic, actress, writer

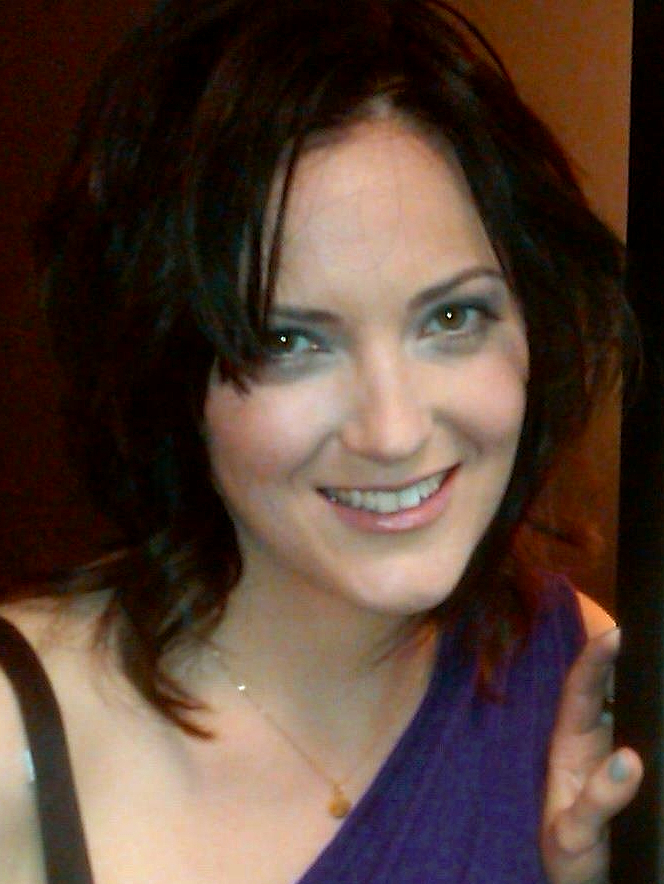
- Kirkman in 2011
- Born: Jennifer Ann Kirkman; 1974 or 1975 (age 51–52); Needham, Massachusetts, U.S.
- Education: Emerson College
- Notable work: Chelsea Lately; Drunk History; I Love...
- Spouse: Neil Mahoney (m. 2009; div. 2011)

Comedy career
- Years active: 1997–present
- Medium: Stand-up, podcast, television, internet
- Genre: Observational comedy
- Website: jenkirkman.com

Jennifer Ann Kirkman (born 1974 or 1975) is an American stand-up comedian and screenwriter, podcaster, and actress. She is known for her regular appearances as a round-table panelist on Chelsea Lately for 70 episodes from 2008 to 2014.

Jen Kirkman was also a guest on @midnight, as well as for her appearances on the Funny or Die sketch series Drunk History, and its continuation television series on Comedy Central.

Her first three comedy albums released are Self Help (2006), Hail to the Freaks (2011) and I'm Gonna Die Alone (And I Feel Fine) (2016), the latter also serving as her debut stand-up feature for Netflix. Her second stand-up feature, Just Keep Livin'?, premiered in January 2017 and was released as an album in November 2018. Her debut book, I Can Barely Take Care of Myself: Tales From a Happy Life Without Kids, was published in April 2013, and became a New York Times bestseller.

== Early life ==
Kirkman was born in Needham, Massachusetts, and is the youngest of three sisters. She is of German, Polish, French-Canadian and English heritage. Her father was general manager of the Needham Golf Club.

Kirkman attended Needham High School and majored in acting at Emerson College in Boston.

== Career ==
Kirkman worked two years after college with the Boston Ballet, Broadway in Boston, and the Comedy Studio in Harvard Square. She spent six years in New York before moving to Los Angeles in 2002. While she worked on her comedy act there, she had jobs that included answering telephones, being a waitress, and cleaning houses.

=== Stand-up comedy ===
Kirkman performs stand-up comedy in Los Angeles, California, appearing regularly at the Hollywood Improv, The Laugh Factory, Largo and The Upright Citizens Brigade Theatre. She has performed with comedians Maria Bamford, Greg Behrendt, Mike Birbiglia and Chelsea Handler. In 2009 and 2010, she performed as part of the Comedians of Chelsea Lately. In 2009, Entertainment Weekly named her one of the "Top 12 Rising Stars in Comedy," and in May 2010, both MSN and The Huffington Post named her one of the top comedians to follow on social networking service Twitter.

Kirkman produces No Fun, her own weekly podcast (previously titled I Seem Fun and Having Funlessness), and has made several appearances on The Crabfeast podcast, which is hosted by comedians Jay Larson and Ryan Sickler. She also appeared regularly on the monthly Pod F. Tompkast podcast with Paul F. Tompkins, on which he referred to her by the nickname 'Southie'.

In 2006, Kirkman released her debut comedy album, Self Help, through Aspecialthing Records. Her second album, Hail to the Freaks, was recorded live at The Upright Citizens Brigade Theatre on December 11, 2010. It was released on May 17, 2011, with a bonus disk of additional material, and peaked at #13 on the Billboard Top Comedy Albums chart.

=== Television ===
Kirkman was a narrator on two episodes of the Funny or Die-produced series Drunk History on Comedy Central, which received the jury prize for "Best Short Film" at the 2010 Sundance Film Festival. Though it is often questioned, she was actually drunk for both episodes. She has made guest appearances on several American television talk shows, including Conan, The View, and The Late Show with Stephen Colbert, and has performed on The Late Late Show with Craig Ferguson, Late Friday, Premium Blend, @midnight and Special Sauce. In 2007, she appeared as a cast member on the short-lived sketch comedy show Acceptable.TV on VH1. She has also made regular voice-over appearances on the Adult Swim series Home Movies and the political satire animated series SuperNews! on Current TV. In 2009, she wrote two episodes of the Disney Channel animated series Phineas and Ferb.

Most notably, Kirkman was a staff writer and round-table regular on E!'s Chelsea Lately. On June 3, 2010, she announced she would be leaving Chelsea Lately to join the writing staff for Perfect Couples, a romantic situation comedy which premiered as a mid-season replacement on NBC on January 20, 2011. She continued to make occasional round-table appearances on Chelsea Lately, beginning in late 2010. Perfect Couples was removed from the NBC schedule on March 11, 2011, and Kirkman returned to the writing staff of Chelsea Lately in April 2011. In 2011, she began making regular appearances on the second season of After Lately.

In November 2013, Deadline reported that FX had landed a script deal to Jen, a half-hour sitcom executive produced, written by and starring Kirkman. The series, set in Boston, Massachusetts, centered on a recently divorced a woman in her mid-30s. The project was backed by Borderline Amazing Productions, with executive producers Chelsea Handler, Tom Brunelle and Brad Wollack.

In May 2015, she released her stand-up feature on Netflix, I'm Gonna Die Alone (And I Feel Fine). Her second stand-up feature for Netflix, Just Keep Livin'?, premiered on January 3, 2017.

In 2017 and 2018, Kirkman contributed to the first two seasons of The Marvelous Mrs. Maisel as a writer, consultant, and producer, providing many of the jokes for the main character's stand-up routines. The series, created by Amy Sherman-Palladino for Amazon, is "loosely based on the concept of Joan Rivers' career."

On October 11, 2017, it was reported that ABC had started development on The Mighty Quinn, a television series written by Kirkman and produced by Julie Anne Robinson. The half-hour comedy series focuses on "39-year-old Quinn, who, after getting dumped by her boyfriend on Christmas Day, takes a year off from dating to find herself."

=== Comedy writing ===
Kirkman's first book, I Can Barely Take Care of Myself: Tales From a Happy Life Without Kids, was published in hardcover on April 16, 2013, and was listed on The New York Times Non-Fiction Best Seller list. In late 2013, she signed her second book deal with Simon & Schuster, a follow-up to her best-selling debut. Her second book, I Know What I'm Doing and Other Lies I Tell Myself: Dispatches from a Life Under Construction, was published in April 2016. She also has several published essays, which have been included in Rejected: Tales of the Failed, Dumped & Canceled and Bad Sex: We Did It So You Don't Have To.

In 2001, Kirkman founded Girlcomic.net with fellow comedian Becky Donohue. The website featured interviews with comedians such as Joy Behar, Margaret Cho, Sue Murphy, Amy Poehler and Sarah Silverman. On the intention of the website, Kirkman stated that the "one thing about feeling like there are still threads of sexism is women can get discouraged and we wanted [to encourage] girls to write funny stories and we wanted to interview famous female comics to let their stories get out. It was meant to be positive and cool and we included men on the site too." Regular updates to the website ceased in 2003, and the domain was ultimately closed in 2006.

In 2021, Kirkman joined The Marvelous Mrs. Maisel as a stand-up consultant for the jokes told by the character of Midge Maisel.

== Influences ==
Kirkman has cited Joan Rivers, Howard Stern, Roseanne Barr, Dave Chappelle, Chris Rock and David Spade as having an influence on her sense of humor.

As an eight-year-old, she would sneak over to a friend's house to watch Sam Kinison and George Carlin comedy specials on HBO. " [Kinison] was a big thing for me," she said, "Someone is yelling, I'm not in trouble, and it's funny." She has cited Morrissey as perhaps her greatest influence, and although she is "nothing like him," his ability "to say morbid things with a sense of humor is now in my DNA."

== Personal life ==
On August 21, 2009, Kirkman married writer/director Neil Mahoney in a private ceremony at the Wayside Inn in Sudbury, Massachusetts. They divorced in 2011 which she explored in her memoir. On the August 25, 2011, episode of Chelsea Lately, she revealed she was no longer married.

=== Louis C.K. allegations ===
In November 2017, following the publication of a report in The New York Times detailing allegations of sexual misconduct against Louis C.K. by five women, Kirkman publicly expressed support for the women who had come forward. In a series of tweets, she stated that she believed the accusers and said she would no longer casually consider C.K. a friend, adding that she could not support his contributions to the power dynamics in the comedy industry. Kirkman had previously spoken about her experiences with C.K. without identifying him by name, describing the difficulties of navigating rumors about a powerful male comedian in the industry. She had clarified earlier that year that C.K. had not harassed her, but that the rumors had influenced her decision-making regarding professional opportunities involving him.

Kirkman later discussed her experiences with C.K. in the 2023 documentary Sorry/Not Sorry, which examined the allegations against him and his return to stand-up comedy. In the documentary, she recalled interactions while working with C.K. on the animated series Home Movies, including an occasion when, after a conversation about his comedy, he asked her what she would think of a man who wanted to masturbate in front of her. Kirkman initially interpreted the question as a joke or an attempt to develop material, but said that C.K. subsequently indicated that he personally enjoyed masturbating in front of people. She recalled that the interaction changed her view of him and that she no longer wanted to be around him.

== Filmography ==
- Friday Night Videos (2001)
- Home Movies (2001–2002)
- Funny Money (2003)
- SuperNews! (2006–2009)
- Acceptable.TV (2007)
- The Very Funny Show (2007)
- Max 1,000 Words (2008)
- The Late Late Show with Craig Ferguson (2008)
- Chelsea Lately (2009–2014)
- Funny or Die Presents (2010)
- Conan (2011)
- Perfect Couples (2011)
- After Lately (2011–2013)
- Drunk History (2013–2015)
- @midnight (2014–2017)
- Have You Been Paying Attention? (2014)
- Every Other Summer (2015)
- American Dirtbags (2015)
- I'm Gonna Die Alone (And I Feel Fine) (2015)
- Just Keep Living? (2017)
- Home Again (2017)
- Sorry/Not Sorry (2023)

== Discography ==
- Self Help (2006)
- Hail to the Freaks (2011)
- I'm Gonna Die Alone (And I Feel Fine) (2016)
- Just Keep Livin'? (2017)
- OK, Gen-X (2022)
