= Chuy Bravo =

Mexican-American entertainer and actor (1956–2019)

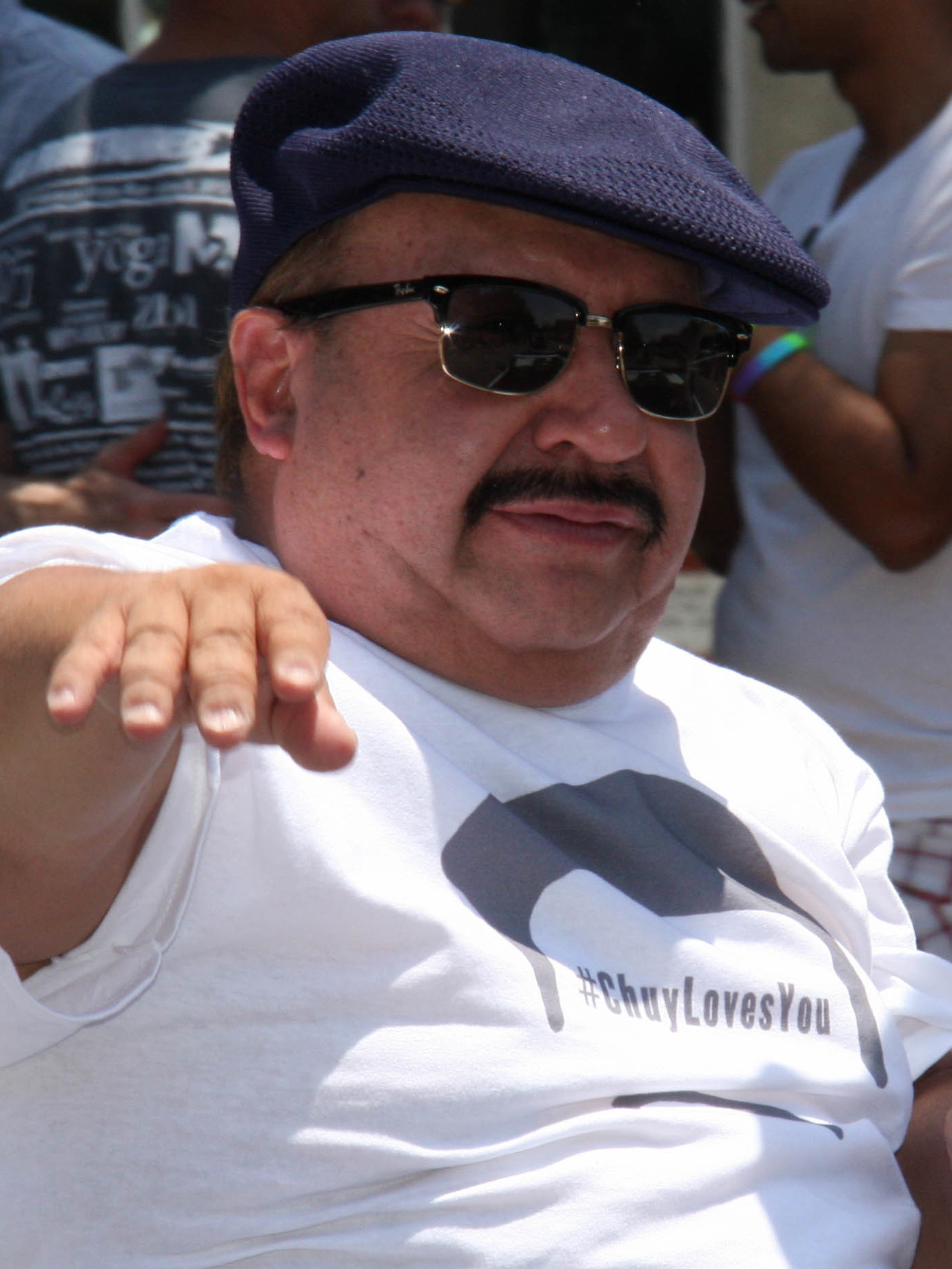
- Bravo at West Hollywood Gay Pride Parade in 2013
- Born: Jesús Melgoza; December 7, 1956; Tangancícuaro, Michoacán, Mexico
- Died: December 14, 2019 (aged 63); Mexico City, Mexico
- Other name: Little Nugget
- Occupations: Television personality, comedian, author
- Years active: 2000–2019
- Known for: Chelsea Lately

Chuy Bravo (born Jesús Melgoza; December 7, 1956 – December 14, 2019) was a Mexican-American actor and entertainer. He was the sidekick of host Chelsea Handler on the talk show Chelsea Lately during its run from 2007 to 2014. He usually provided comedic relief to Handler's show, and was the topic of many of her jokes.

== Early life ==
Bravo was born in Tangancicuaro, Michoacán, Mexico, the youngest of seven children. At the age of fifteen he came with his family to the San Fernando Valley.

In his new home, Bravo had a difficult time fitting in and finding work. After graduating from Sylmar High School, he took a job assembling PC boards. He also began his own janitorial service business. In the 1990s he fell into alcohol abuse, and was imprisoned for sixteen months for driving under the influence.

Upon his release, he resolved to straighten out his life, and took acting classes for two years. He went on to find an agent and began auditioning. His first film role, in Austin Powers in Goldmember (2002), did not make the final cut.

== Acting career ==
Bravo began acting in the early 2000s. He appeared in the films Tiptoes (2003) with Matthew McConaughey; The Rundown (2003) with The Rock; The Honeymooners (2005) with Cedric the Entertainer and had an uncredited role in Pirates of the Caribbean: At World's End (2007).

Bravo met Handler through a mutual director friend he was working with who told him that she was looking to cast a little person. After being introduced they soon became friends and started working together. Bravo appeared in every episode of Chelsea Lately from 2007 until its end in 2014. Bravo also appeared in the behind-the-scenes mockumentary After Lately that ran concurrently from 2011 to 2013.

When Handler's show ended in 2014 Bravo went on to appear in The Sex Trip (2016) and Buscando Nirvana (2017). He appeared in the short film The One II - Resurrection of the Vampires (2015) and his last appearance in movies was a return to that series in The One: Horror – Cupido, Divinitas (2017).

Bravo also appeared in pornographic films, notably for Vivid Entertainment, the most known of which is Chuy Bravo Porn Star.

== Splash ==
In 2013, Bravo was a competitor on the celebrity diving reality competition show Splash on ABC. However, he suffered a freak injury prior to the competition's first round, breaking his heel, and was forced to withdraw. On the show Bravo said that he was very disappointed about his injury and that he wanted to show the world and a "special someone" (presumably Handler) that he was not lazy; he vowed to return for the second season of Splash if he was asked back and if the series was renewed (it was not).

== Personal life and death ==
Bravo had dwarfism, and was 4 feet 3 inches (130 cm) tall.

In 2010 his book Little Nuggets of Wisdom Big Advice from the Small Star of Chelsea Lately was published.

In 2012, Bravo revealed that he survived prostate cancer, which was treated quickly after it was diagnosed. He also said he is a recovering alcoholic and was nearly homeless at one point in his life. "I have been through a lot in my life... but I've overcome my struggles and now I'm finally living my life."

Bravo started the Little Nugget Foundation in his hometown of Tangancicuaro to provide food and clothing for those struggling with alcoholism.

Bravo served as master of ceremonies for the national comedy tour Comedians of Chelsea Lately that included Dov Davidoff and Christina Pazsitsky.

He also started the Bravo Academy in Los Angeles, stating to have a focus on the Latin community in Hollywood. The academy's purpose is to help its talents participate in different projects in television, cinema and theater.

In 2013 Bravo opened a taco stand in Hollywood Chuy Bravo's Taqueria selling "tacos, carne asada burritos, tortas, nachos and sopes." Bravo also created a signature line of chips and salsa, and sold other merchandise on his website.

Bravo developed gastrointestinal bleeding on December 14, 2019, and was rushed to the emergency room at Dalinde Medical Center in Mexico City. He developed complications and had an acute heart attack, after which he was pronounced dead. He was 63 years old.
