= Love You, Mean It with Whitney Cummings =

- Genre: Comedy
- Starring: Whitney Cummings (as host); Julian McCullough (as co-host)
- Country of origin: United States
- Original language: English
- No. of seasons: 1
- No. of episodes: 11

Production
- Executive producers: Brad Wollack; Chelsea Handler; Tom Brunelle; Whitney Cummings
- Production company: Borderline Amazing Productions

Original release
- Network: E!
- Release: November 28, 2012 – February 6, 2013

Love You, Mean It with Whitney Cummings is a weekly American talk show series that was broadcast on E!. The series premiered on November 28, 2012. E! initially ordered six episodes of the series and later agreed for six more episodes in January 2013. The series was eventually canceled.

== Premise ==
The series featured Whitney Cummings voicing her comedic opinions about current events. Julian McCullough served as Whitney's co-host.

== Episodes ==
No.	Title	Original release date	US viewers (millions)
1	"Mindy Kaling"	November 28, 2012	0.477
2	"Lizzy Caplan"	December 5, 2012	0.409
3	"Will Ferrell"	December 12, 2012	0.316
4	"Chelsea Handler"	December 19, 2012	0.353
5	"Ginnifer Goodwin"	December 26, 2012	0.325
6	"Chris D'Elia, Stevie Ryan & Will Sasso"	January 2, 2013	0.374
7	"Kathy Griffin"	January 9, 2013	0.430
8	"Kevin Nealon"	January 16, 2013	0.366
9	"Kristen Schaal, Tone Bell & Jim Jefferies"	January 23, 2013	0.476
10	"Adam Scott"	January 30, 2013	0.404
11	"John Cleese"	February 6, 2013	0.396
12	"Jimmy Kimmel"	Unaired	N/A

== Reception ==
The series has been widely compared to Chelsea Handler's series Chelsea Lately. Cummings has responded to the comparison with Handler by saying she expects to be more deferential to her guests than Handler often is.

== Broadcast ==
In Australia, the series premiered on December 2, 2012 on E!.
