= Josh Wolf (comedian) =

American comedian (born 1969)

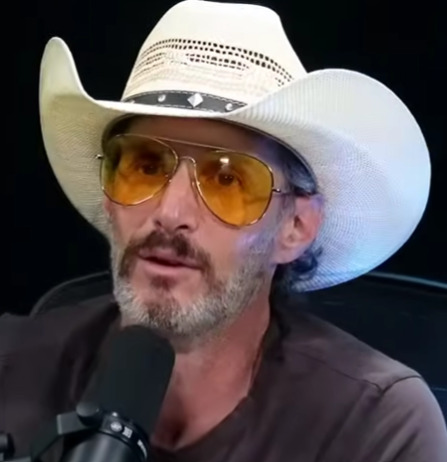
- Wolf in 2025
- Born: 1969 (age 56–57); Boston, Massachusetts, U.S.
- Education: Trinity University
- Occupations: Comedian; actor; writer
- Years active: 1999–present
- Known for: Chelsea Lately; After Lately
- Spouse: Bethany Ashton Wolf (m. 2004)
- Relatives: Scott Wolf (cousin)

Josh Wolf (born 1969) is an American comedian, actor, and writer. He has written for a number of sitcoms, including All of Us and Cuts. He is best known for his regular appearances on the round table of E!'s late-night talk show Chelsea Lately. Wolf hosted the Josh Wolf Show in 2016.

== Early life and education ==
Wolf is Jewish. He grew up in Massachusetts. He is an alumnus of Trinity University in San Antonio, Texas.

== Career ==
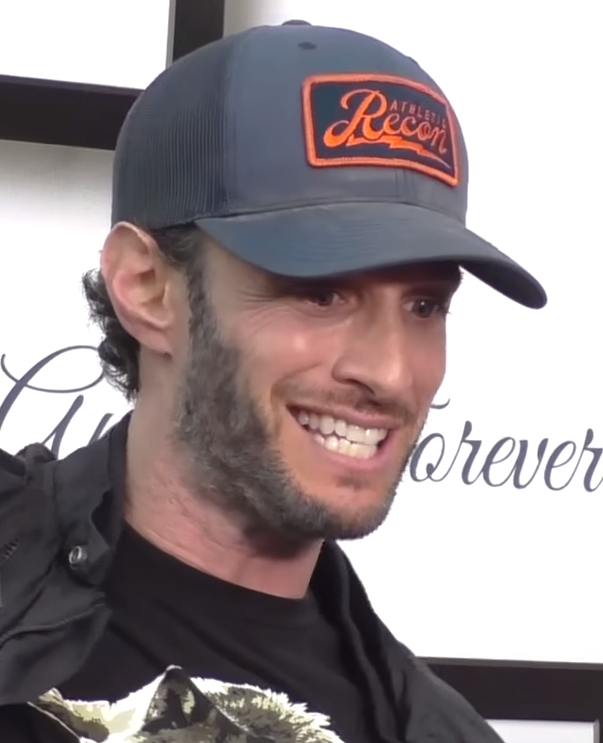
Wolf in 2016

He was introduced to comedy at the age of sixteen, doing an entire set about his parents' gas. Having moved to Seattle, he became a spokesperson for Nintendo and interviewed Bill Gates for an internal film for Microsoft. He moved once more to Los Angeles and was spotted while doing a one-man show at the HBO Workspace. He signed a two-year deal with ABC to develop his own television show, but it was never broadcast. He instead concentrated on writing for sitcoms such as UPN's All of Us and Cuts.

Wolf was a regular on the round table of E!'s late-night talk show Chelsea Lately. He appears as one of the comedians on the "Comedians of Chelsea Lately" stand-up tour, and has previously appeared as the warm-up act for Chelsea Handler.

He also appeared as a finalist on the fourth season of NBC's Last Comic Standing in the "Last Comic Downloaded" segment, he was beaten by Theo Von. In 2012, he worked on an untitled project for Fox, starring himself as a single father. It was to be a semi-autobiographical show, being based in part on Wolf's experiences as a single dad. He has also sold a book to Grand Central Publishing. Wolf has sold a script to Adam Sandler's Happy Madison Productions based on the true story of a traveling youth baseball team which was used as a cover for the robberies committed by its coach. On July 20, 2012, he began hosting a weekly podcast with fellow Chelsea Lately regular Ross Mathews called Josh and Ross. That same year, Discovery Channel hired Wolf to host Shark After Dark. In September 2013, Wolf began hosting his own podcast on the Toad Hop Network called Off the Rails with Josh Wolf. As of 2015, Wolf hosted a podcast with Sarah Colonna called Off the Rails with Josh Wolf and Sarah Colonna.

On June 11, 2015, The Josh Wolf Show, a late-night talk show which he hosts, debuted on CMT.

== Personal life ==
He has been married to director and writer Bethany Ashton Wolf since 2004 and has three children. His cousin is former Party of Five actor Scott Wolf.

== Filmography ==
| Year | Title | Role | Notes |
|---|---|---|---|
| 1999 | Home Improvement | Usher | Episode "Neighbours" |
| 2003 | A.U.S.A. | Court clerk | Episodes "The Joint Report... a Love Story" and "The Kiss" |
| 2004–05 | All of Us | | 2 episodes as writer Nominated for 2005 BET Comedy Award |
| 2005–06 | Cuts | | 2 episodes as writer |
| 2006 | Last Comic Standing | As himself | Season finale |
| 2006–09 | My Name Is Earl | Josh | 8 episodes |
| 2010–11 | Raising Hope | Josh | 3 episodes Writer for episode "Sheer Madness" |
| 2010–14 | Chelsea Lately | As himself | Round table regular and writer |
| 2011–13 | After Lately | As himself | Series regular |
| 2013 | Shark After Dark Live | Host | Discovery Shark Week |
| 2015–2016 | The Josh Wolf Show | Host | Late Night Talk Show on CMT |
