= Esther Povitsky =

American comedian (born 1988)

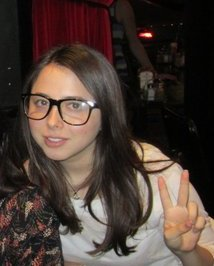
- Povitsky in 2012
- Born: March 2, 1988 (age 38); Chicago, Illinois, U.S.
- Other name: Little Esther
- Education: University of Illinois at Urbana–Champaign
- Occupations: Writer; actress; comedian; producer
- Years active: 2008–present
- Known for: Crazy Ex-Girlfriend; Alone Together
- Children: 2

Esther Povitsky (born March 2, 1988), for a time known by the stage name "Little Esther," is an American stand-up comedian, actress, writer, and producer from Chicago. She is the co-creator and star of the comedy series Alone Together (2018); she starred as Izzy in the Hulu series Dollface. Povitsky's debut comedy special, Hot for My Name, premiered on Comedy Central on July 17, 2020. She also co-hosts the weekly podcast Trash Tuesday alongside Khalyla Kuhn, and formerly Annie Lederman.

== Early life and education ==
Povitsky was born in Chicago to Mary and Morrie Povitsky. Her father is of Russian-Jewish descent and her mother is of Christian Finnish descent. Her mother worked as an administrative assistant for the Youth Services of Glenview/Northbrook. She has one older half-sister from her mother's first marriage. Esther grew up in the Chicago suburb of Skokie; she graduated there from Niles North High School in 2006.

After high school, Esther Povitsky attended the University of Illinois at Urbana–Champaign for three years before she dropped out to pursue a career in stand-up comedy and acting. "I was really unhappy at my school," Povitsky recalled. "A lot of people were in sororities and a lot of people drank all the time, and I wasn't into either of those things, so I really did not feel like I fit in."

She then studied comedy at iO Chicago and The Second City in Chicago before moving to Los Angeles, where she took classes with The Groundlings. She has performed regularly at The Comedy Store, The Ice House, and The Improv which are all in southern California.

== Career ==
=== 2012–2014: Early projects ===
Povitsky had a recurring role, starring as Maya on the series Crazy Ex-Girlfriend from 2016 until 2019. Other television appearances include Brooklyn Nine-Nine, Love, and Parks and Recreation. She was in the semifinals of 2015's Last Comic Standing (season 9).

Povitsky began podcasting with Deathsquad.tv regularly after that. She hosted Little Esther's Piecast and was the former co-host of Brode & Esther with fellow comedian Brody Stevens. She was the host of Weird Adults with Little Esther and along with Caroline Goldfarb, co-hosts Glowing Up, a makeup and beauty-themed podcast. She often appears as a guest on Deathsquad.tv's Ice House Chronicles.

In 2012, Povitsky declined an offer from MTV to do a reality show based on her life as a comedian because she felt the series would be too invasive.

=== 2015–present: Alone Together and Hot for My Name ===
In 2015, Povitsky wrote, starred in, and produced the short film Alone Together. Later the short was adapted into a pilot for Freeform and produced by The Lonely Island. In December 2016, the pilot was picked up to series. In October 2017, Freeform renewed the series for a second season ahead of its January 2018 debut, however the series was canceled after its second season in 2019.

On July 17, 2020, Povitsky's debut comedy special, Hot for My Name, was released through Comedy Central.

=== Fashion brand ===
Povitsky has her own fashion brand, "Sleepover by Esther"; she advertises it on her Instagram. She regularly advertises her brand on the Trash Tuesday podcast and often posts herself on Instagram modeling her brand's clothing.

== Personal life ==
Povitsky is married to comedy writer Dave King; they had their first child, a daughter named Ace King, on March 30, 2024. Their second child, Bernard King, was born February 23, 2026.

== Filmography ==
=== Film ===
Year	Title	Role	Notes	Ref.
2008	The Express: The Ernie Davis Story	Teen Model	Uncredited	
2010	April	Val Monroe	Short film	
2011	All in All	Nicole	Short film	
2011	The Eater	Sandy	Short film	
2014	My Daughter's Boyfriend	Sara Martinson	Short film	
2015	Alone Together	Esther	Short film	
2015	What a Nice Party		Short film	
2016	Worst Birthday		Short film	
2018	Dude	Alicia		
2021	Mark, Mary & Some Other People	Esther		
2021	Home Sweet Home Alone	Daisy Breckin		
2024	Drugstore June	June	Also co-writer and executive producer	
2024	Lost & Found in Cleveland	Sara Levine		

=== Television ===
Year	Title	Role	Notes	Ref.
2010–2011	Jimmy Kimmel Live!	Little sister / Bristol Palin / Jimmy's Sister	Guest role; 3 episodes	
2011	New Girl	Krystal	Episode: "Bells"	
2012	Daddy Knows Best	Babysitter	Episode: "The Babysitter"	
2013	Parks and Recreation	Julie	Episode: "Swing Vote"	
2013	Brody Stevens: Enjoy It!	Herself	Recurring role; 3 episodes	
2013	Adam Devine's House Party	Herself	Episode: "Space Jump II"	
2014	Talking Marriage with Ryan Bailey	Herself	Episode: "Comedians in Car Ports"	
2014	Esther With Hot Chicks	Herself	Web series (3 episode run for MTV)	
2014	Pound House	Phone Girl	Recurring role; 2 episodes	
2014	Hope and Randy	Hope	Television mini-series	
2014	Key & Peele	Cassie	Episode: "Alien Impostors"	
2014	Six Guys One Car	Pawn Shop Girl	Recurring role; 2 episodes	
2015	Comics Unleashed	Herself	Guest appearance	
2015	Difficult People	Cissy Donato	Episode: "The Children's Menu"	
2015	Candidly Nicole	Herself	Episode: "Ex-Girlfriend"	
2015–2017	Cocktales with Little Esther	Herself	Web series; host	
2015–2016	@midnight	Herself	Guest appearance; 4 episodes	
2016	Workaholics	Jordana	Episode: "Save the Cat"	
2016	Lady Dynamite	Kristy Coombs	Episode: "Loaf Coach"	
2016	The Amazing Gayl Pile	Jenny	Recurring role; 3 episodes	
2016	Brooklyn Nine-Nine	Emily	Episode: "Coral Palms: Part 2"	
2016	Not Safe with Nikki Glaser	Herself	Episode: "I'm the Boat"	
2016–2018	Love	Alexis	Guest role; 3 episodes	
2016–2019	Crazy Ex-Girlfriend	Maya	Recurring role; 19 episodes	
2018	Alone Together	Esther	Main role; 20 episodes; also co-creator, writer, executive producer	
2018	The Story of our Times	Candace	Television film	
2019	Shrill	Kayla	Episode: "Pencil"	
2019–2022	Dollface	Izzy	Main role	
2021	iCarly	Brooke	Episode: "iTake a Girls Trip"; also writer	
2022	Reboot	Marcy	Episode: "What We Do in the Shadows"	

=== Comedy specials ===
Year	Title	Notes	Ref.
2020	Hot for My Name	Premiered on Comedy Central	

== Podcasts ==
Year	Title	Notes	Ref.
2010	Red Bar Radio 12-29-10	Mike David and Co-host James Fritz talk comedy, The Joe Rogan Podcast, and dating Brian "Redban"	
2011–2014	Brode & Esther	Co-hosted with Brody Stevens	
2012–2017	Weird Adults with Little Esther	Interview-style podcast	
2017–present	Glowing Up	Beauty and lifestyle-themed podcast; co-hosted with Caroline Goldfarb	
2020–present	My Pleasure (formerly Esther Club)	Solo podcast	
2021–present	Trash Tuesday (formerly Bloodbath)	Co-hosted with Annie Lederman and Khalyla Kuhn	
2021	Edith!	Plays Trudie Grayson	
