= Heather McDonald =

American actress, comedian and author (born 1970)

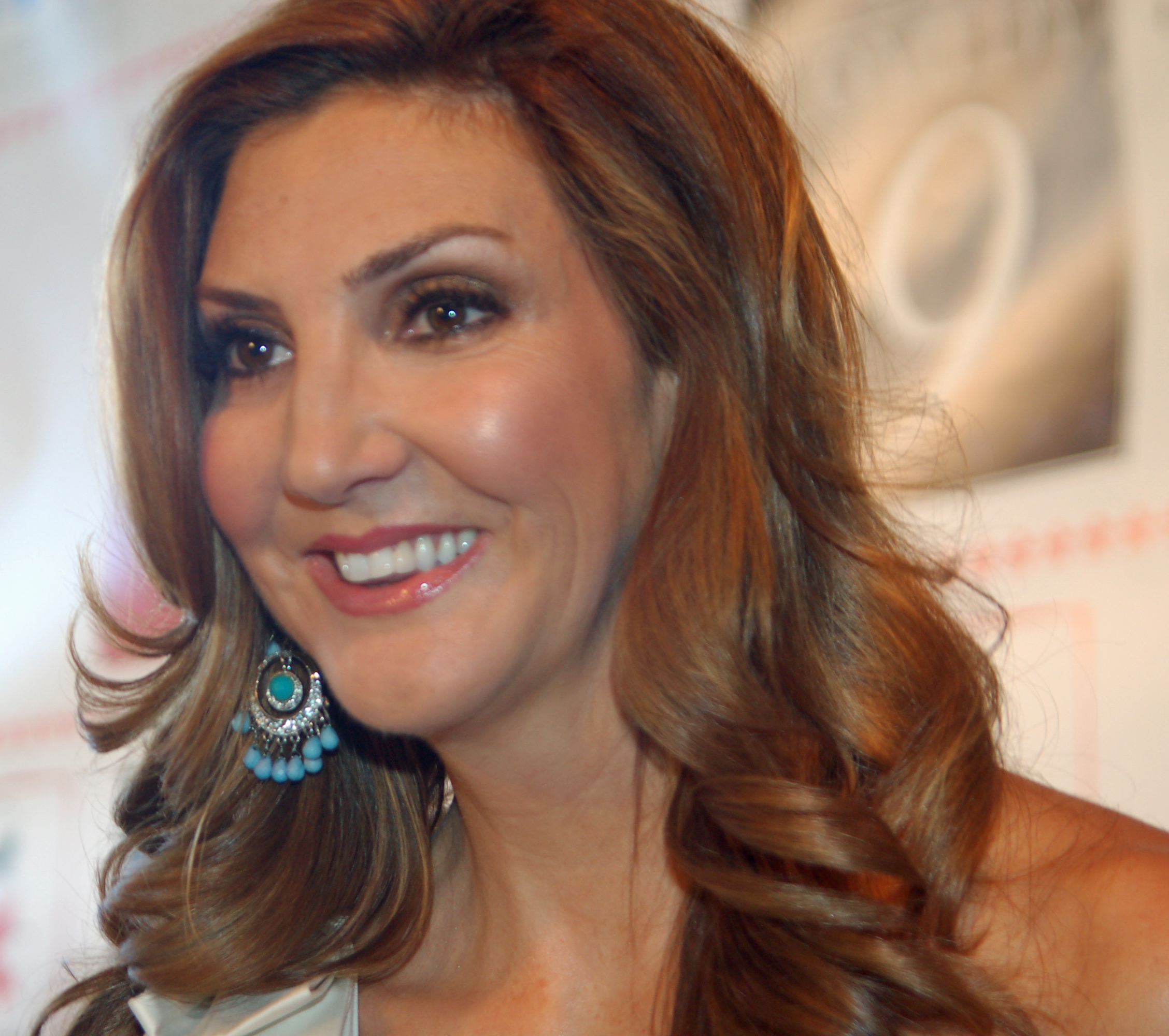
- McDonald in April 2011
- Born: Heather Ann McDonald; June 14, 1970 (age 56); Los Angeles, California, U.S.
- Education: University of Southern California
- Notable work: Chelsea Lately; After Lately
- Spouse: Peter Dobias (m. 2000)
- Children: 3

Comedy career
- Years active: 1990s–present
- Genres: Sketch comedy; observational comedy
- Website: heathermcdonald.net

Heather Ann McDonald (born June 14, 1970) is an American stand-up comedian, actress and author. Born and raised in Southern California, she is known for her appearances on the E! series Chelsea Lately. She was one of the eight writers on the show and often participated in sketches and segments. McDonald also wrote and appeared in the show's spin-off, After Lately. She is the host of the pop culture podcast “Juicy Scoop with Heather McDonald.” Her first book, a 2010 memoir of her college years, made the Bestseller List of The New York Times.

== Early life ==
McDonald was born in 1970 in the San Fernando Valley, to real estate agent parents. She is of three quarters Irish and one quarter French-Canadian descent. She and her brothers and sisters were raised Catholic and attended private Catholic schools. After high school, McDonald attended the University of Southern California (USC), where she was majored in business and communications a member of the Gamma Phi Beta sorority.

After graduating from USC, McDonald began to take theatre classes at The Groundlings. During her time there, McDonald performed improvisational shows and sketch comedy at the Groundlings Theatre. At the same time, McDonald became a licensed realtor like her parents.

== Career ==
In the late 1990s, McDonald began writing with Keenen Ivory Wayans. In 2001 and 2002, she was a writer and performer for MTV's Lyricist Lounge. She made an appearance on Frasier as one of Frasier's many blind dates.

McDonald first gained popularity through her stand-up comedy shows in Los Angeles. She also began writing and performing for the Wayans Brothers in several of their films. She was a writer and roundtable regular on Chelsea Lately since its premiere in 2007.

In June 2010, McDonald published her first book, a memoir entitled You'll Never Blue Ball in This Town Again: One Woman's Painfully Funny Quest to Give It Up, which made The New York Times Best-Seller List. The memoir covers her college and sorority experience while attending the University of Southern California. McDonald published a second memoir in 2013, entitled My Inappropriate Life (Some Stories Not Suitable for Nuns, Children, or Mature Adults).

McDonald's standup special entitled Heather McDonald: I Don't Mean To Brag was recorded in 2014 and released on Netflix in September 2015. She also has a podcast called "Juicy Scoop with Heather McDonald," which began airing in June 2015.

McDonald has a repertoire of women characters of whom she does impressions in her standup routines.

On February 5, 2022 during a show in Tempe, Arizona, McDonald collapsed on stage during a live performance due to receiving multiple COVID-19 vaccines. She later claimed that she had been feeling unwell and dizzy prior to her set. She was taken to a hospital and treated for a fractured skull.

== Personal life ==
McDonald is married to Peter Dobias, with whom she has three children. They reside in Los Angeles.

== Filmography ==
=== Film ===
Year	Title	Role	Notes
2004	White Chicks	Saleswoman	
2009	Dance Flick	Girl's Gym Teacher	
2018	Hurricane Bianca: From Russia with Hate	Beverly Ann	
2018	Leprechaun Returns	Tory Reding (voice)	

=== Television ===
Year	Title	Role	Notes
2000	The Lyricist Lounge Show	Various	Also writer
2001	Frasier	Judy	Episode: "Sliding Frasiers"
2002	Watching Ellie	Waitress	Episode: "Gift"
2003	Reno 911!	Maid of Honor	Episode: "Clementine Gets Married"
2004	Quintuplets	Director	Episode: "Bob and Carol Save Christmas"
2005	Malcolm in the Middle	Nancy	Episode: "Malcolm's Car"
2006	Drake & Josh	Unknown role	Episode: "The Demonator"
2006	Thugaboo: Sneaker Madness	Gwenny	Television film
2006	Thugaboo: A Miracle on D-Roc's Street	Gwenny / Gavin's mom (voice)	Television film
2007	What News?	Angela Schramm	Television film
2007-2014	Chelsea Lately	Herself	Various Episodes
2014	Female Moments	Unknown role	Episode: "Cafe Con Life"; Also writer
2014	RuPaul's Drag Race	Herself	Guest Judge; Season 6 Episode 5
2014	Heather McDonald: I Don't Mean to Brag	Herself	Stand-up special; Also writer and producer
2016	#ThisIsCollege	Sherry	TV Mini-series; Episode: "Going Home"
2026	The Real Housewives of Beverly Hills	Herself	Episode: "Closing Chapters"

== Discography ==
All credits adapted from Apple Music and Spotify.

=== As lead artist ===
==== Singles ====
Year	Title	Album	Writer(s)	Producer(s)
2026	"Juicy Scoop"	Non-album single	Heather McDonald, Drew Louis, Jayelle Gerber	Drew Louis

==== Comedy albums ====
Title	Details
Juicy Scoop	Released: November 20, 2020; Label: Self-released; Format: Digital download, streaming; Track listing: 1. "Mother Judgers & Attempting Gratitude"; 2. "The Grocery Narc & the Cool Parent"; 3. "The Boot Mystery"; 4. "In Flight Entertainment"; 5. "Unclaimed Dick & Lost Luggage"; 6. "A Weekend in Jacksonville"; 7. "America's TV Shows"; 8. "Facebook Crazy"; 9. "Going Out & the Dry Hump"; 10. "Kids Ruin Everything"; 11. "I Didn't Marry My Best Friend"; 12. "Frostbite & Facials"; 13. "Things Hit My Car (The Problem)"; 14. "Things Hit My Car (The Solution)"; 15. "The Ex-Boyfriend Search"

=== As featured artist ===
==== Singles ====
Year	Title	Album	Writer(s)	Producer(s)
2025	"Celebrity Moms"	Ruckus Comedy Presents: Gotham Comedy Live, Vol. 33	Heather McDonald	No producers credited
2025	"Medication"	Ruckus Comedy Presents: Gotham Comedy Live, Vol. 33	Heather McDonald	No producers credited
2025	"Cheap Husbands"	Ruckus Comedy Presents: Gotham Comedy Live, Vol. 33	Heather McDonald	No producers credited
2014	"Forget About the Boy (From 'Thorougly Modern Milly')"	Heartsongs: Melodies of Love	Jeanine Tesori, Raul Benitez, Dick Scanlan, Garrett Breeze	Eric Hansen
2014	"Gimme, Gimme That Thing Called Love (From 'Thorougly Modern Milly')"	Heartsongs: Melodies of Love	Jeanine Tesori, Raul Benitez, Dick Scanlan, Garrett Breeze	Eric Hansen
