= Sarah Colonna =

American comedian and actress

- Born: Sarah Noel Colonna; December 29, 1974 (age 51); Wiesbaden, West Germany
- Education: University of Arkansas
- Notable work: Chelsea Lately, Scare Tactics, After Lately
- Spouse: Jon Ryan (m. 2016)

Comedy career
- Medium: Television

Sarah Noel Colonna (born December 29, 1974) is an American stand-up comedian, actress, and comedy writer. She appeared as a roundtable regular on the hit E! cable TV network comedy/talk show Chelsea Lately.

== Early life ==
Colonna was born in Wiesbaden, West Germany. She grew up in Farmington, Arkansas, with her mother, who is a secretary in a funeral home. Her father was a newspaper sports editor in Los Angeles, California. Her great-great uncle was actor and comedian Jerry Colonna. She attended the University of Arkansas and later moved to Los Angeles in pursuit of a career in acting and stand-up comedy. Colonna also worked as a bartender before becoming an entertainer.

== Career ==
Colonna's first televised stand up appearance was on Comedy Central's Premium Blend, hosted by Harland Williams. In 2006, she was one of 5 finalists in TBS and Myspace's "Stand up or Sit Down Comedy Challenge," which aired on TBS and was taped at Caesars Palace in Las Vegas. Colonna also appeared on BBC's The World Stands Up, which tapes in London and features popular comedians from around the world.

In 2008, Colonna filmed a pilot for TBS titled Comedy Road Show which taped on location in Macon, Georgia. That same year, she also began appearing regularly on the hit E! show Chelsea Lately as a roundtable guest, and in 2009 was hired full-time as a writer for the show. Handler's production company, Borderline Amazing Productions, produced the Comedians of Chelsea Lately, which featured some of the popular comics from her show, on which Colonna was featured. The special was taped at the Nokia Club in Los Angeles, shown on E!, and sparked a tour of the comics across the country which began in the fall of 2009.

Colonna also has appeared on various television shows, including Battle Creek, United States of Tara, Monk, Strong Medicine, Invasion, and Days of Our Lives. She was also a regular on the hit hidden camera Sci Fi show Scare Tactics, which was originally hosted by actress Shannen Doherty, and later hosted by comedian/actor Tracy Morgan of Saturday Night Live fame. She also co-starred in Michael Rosenbaum's film Back in the Day and Diablo Cody's Paradise.

Colonna has been headlining nationally as a comedian and has also performed with Chelsea Handler at venues such as Radio City Music Hall and The Colosseum at Caesars Palace. She starred as part of the ensemble cast of E!'s network television series After Lately and also served as a producer on the show. Her first book, Life As I Blow It, was released on February 7, 2012, and debuted at number 5 on the New York Times Bestseller List. Her second book, Has Anyone Seen My Pants? was released on March 31, 2015, by Gallery Books, an imprint of Simon & Schuster. Colonna continues to headline nationally throughout the country and also has a weekly podcast with fellow Chelsea Lately comedian Josh Wolf called Off The Rails, which is available on iTunes.

Colonna appeared as a guest spy on Bar Rescue when she did recon for Second Base, formerly Extreme's, in addition to appearing alongside Jon Ryan as one of the recon spies for Black Light District Rock & Roll Lounge.

In 2017, it was announced that Colonna was cast as Angie Bladell in Insatiable, which premiered August 10, 2018, on Netflix.

Since 2019, Colonna has appeared as Lori on Shameless.

== Personal life ==
Colonna became engaged to Seattle Seahawks punter Jon Ryan in 2014. They married July 9, 2016, in Los Cabos, Mexico. Comedian Ross Mathews, who introduced the couple to each other, officiated at the ceremony.

== Filmography ==
=== Film ===
Year	Title	Role	Notes
2005	Going Shopping	Shopper	Uncredited
2013	Paradise	Clerk	
2014	Back in the Day	Carol	
2014	Buttwhistle	Mrs. Blancmange	
2017	Killing Hasselhoff	Dina D'Andrea	

=== Television ===
Year	Title	Role	Notes
2004	Strong Medicine	Nora	Episode: "A Dose of Reality"
2004–2005	Days of Our Lives	Maura	2 episodes
2006	Invasion	Guardswoman	Episode: "Round Up"
2007	Monk	Irate Mother	Episode: "Mr. Monk and the Man Who Shot Santa Claus"
2009	United States of Tara	Woman #1	Episode: "Snow"
2015	Battle Creek	Gail	Episode: "Heirlooms"
2018–2019	Insatiable	Angie Bladell	Main cast
2019	Shameless	Lori	Recurring role; 10 episodes

== Published works ==
- Colonna, Sarah (2012). Life As I Blow It: Tales of Love, Life & Sex . . . Not Necessarily in That Order. Villard. ISBN 978-0345528377.
- Colonna, Sarah (2015). Has Anyone Seen My Pants?. Gallery Books, an imprint of Simon & Schuster. ISBN 978-1476771922.
