= The Soup Investigates =

Television series

- Genre: Infotainment
- Presented by: Joel McHale
- Country of origin: United States
- Original language: English
- No. of seasons: 1
- No. of episodes: 7

Production
- Running time: 22 minutes

Original release
- Network: E!
- Release: June 19 – November 6, 2013

Related
- The Soup

The Soup Investigates is a comedic news television series on E!. It is a spin-off of The Soup. While The Soup reports and makes fun of news events during the previous week, its spinoff follows a group of newspeople who inquire around for news stories that are potentially humorous. Like its parent, The Soup Investigates is hosted by Joel McHale.

The series' pilot episode, featuring comedians Michael Kosta, Sarah Tiana, and Eli Olsberg, aired on June 19, 2013.

== Production ==
On April 22, 2013, E! announced that it was developing the series. It was announced on August 21, 2013, that E! had ordered a six-episode first season, which premiered on October 2, 2013.

== Ratings ==
The Soup Investigates premiered to a 0.3 rating in the Adults 18-49 demographic and 0.61 million viewers.

== International broadcast ==
The series premiered on E! Australia on November 3, 2013. Later it was shown on E! Israel.
