= Julian McCullough =

American actor, writer and comedian

- Born: May 29, 1979 (age 47); Philadelphia, Pennsylvania, United States
- Occupations: Actor, writer, producer, comedian
- Years active: 2001–present
- Notable work: Love You, Mean It with Whitney Cummings, Chelsea Lately, Guy Code
- Website: http://www.julianmccullough.com/

Julian McCullough (born May 29, 1979) is an American actor, writer, producer, and comedian best known for his appearances on Love You, Mean It with Whitney Cummings, Chelsea Lately, and Guy Code.

== Early life ==
McCullough was born in Philadelphia, Pennsylvania in 1979. He later moved to New Jersey and attended Moorestown High School. He initially attended college in California before attending Rutgers University, where he majored in English. After graduating from college in 2001, McCullough moved to Brooklyn, New York where he began to pursue a career in comedy.

== Career ==
=== Comedy ===
In 2007, McCullough participated in the Just for Laughs comedy festival in Montreal, Quebec, Canada and appeared on an episode of the Comedy Central television series Live at Gotham hosted by Robert Schimmel. McCullough has performed at the Comedy Cellar, Carolines on Broadway, and Stand Up New York.

McCullough has appeared as a guest comic on several television shows, including Comedy Central Presents, Late Night with Jimmy Fallon, Funny as Hell, Larry King Now, Conan, All Growz Up with Melinda Hill, the NPR series This American Life, and the MTV series Money From Strangers. He was a contributor to the MTV2 program Guy Code during its first two seasons in 2011 and 2012. He has been a frequent round table guest on the E! series Chelsea Lately since 2012, and was the sidekick to Whitney Cummings on the short-lived talk show Love You, Mean It with Whitney Cummings in 2012 to 2013.

McCullough has also hosted three specials on VH1 and has hosted the series Very Funny News on TBS alongside Rachel Perry.

In 2018, McCullough hosted Discovery Channel's Shark After Dark, a live, late-night aftershow for the network’s iconic Shark Week.

In 2024, he served as host and opener for comedian Nate Bargatze's "Be Funny" Tour.

Appears on Nate Bargatze's "Greatest Average American" game show on Hulu.

=== Acting ===
McCullough guest-starred on the IFC series Z Rock in 2009. He also starred in his self-produced TV movie Supermodel Moving Company in 2010. He appeared as Nick on an episode of Whitney in 2012.
