= What Would Ryan Lochte Do? =

- Genre: Reality
- Starring: Ryan Lochte
- Country of origin: United States
- Original language: English
- No. of seasons: 1
- No. of episodes: 8

Production
- Executive producers: Erika Wright; Kevin Dill; Mechelle Collins
- Running time: 21 to 23 minutes
- Production companies: Intuitive Entertainment; Wright Entertainment and Sports

Original release
- Network: E!
- Release: April 21 – May 27, 2013

What Would Ryan Lochte Do? is an American reality television series on E! that debuted on April 21, 2013. The series chronicles the life of American competitive swimmer and Olympian Ryan Lochte as he prepares for the 2016 Summer Olympics while creating his fashion line, making media appearances, spending time with his family and friends as well as searching for the woman he can call his wife.

== Episodes ==
| No. | Title | Original release date | U.S. viewers (millions) |
|---|---|---|---|
| 1 | "What Would Ryan Lochte Do... With a TV Show?" | April 21, 2013 | 0.80 |
| 2 | "What Would Ryan Lochte Do... in Washington D.C.?" | April 28, 2013 | 0.39 |
| 3 | "What Would Ryan Lochte Do... for Love?" | May 5, 2013 | 0.47 |
| 4 | "What Would Ryan Lochte Do... If He Got Plastered?" | May 12, 2013 | 0.47 |
| 5 | "What Would Ryan Lochte Do... In Hollywood?" | May 19, 2013 | 0.37 |
| 6 | "What Would Ryan Lochte Do... When Family Gets Involved?" | May 26, 2013 | 0.41 |
| 7 | "What Would Ryan Lochte Do... For His Brother?" | May 27, 2013 | 0.30 |
| 8 | "What Would Ryan Lochte Do... On Spring Break?" | May 27, 2013 | 0.32 |

== Broadcast ==
In Australia, the series premiered from May 28, 2013 on E!. Lochte made use of his desired catchphrase, "Jeah!" and Lochterage, a term that he defines as “Inner Circle Dedicated To Turning It Up At All Times.”

== Reception ==
The show received negative reviews. It was called a "crushing commercial and creative failure" by The A.V. Club and "gloriously terrible" by The Washington Post. Prior to the show's premiere, E! president Suzanne Kolb believed that viewers would fall into three categories: "they want to be him, sleep with him or mother him." The show was canceled after one season for low ratings.
