= After Lately =

2011 American TV series

- Genre: Comedy; Improvisational; Mockumentary
- Created by: Chelsea Handler; Brad Wollack; Tom Brunelle
- Creative director: Johnny Milord
- Starring: Chelsea Handler; Brad Wollack; Chris Franjola; Chuy Bravo; Heather McDonald; Jeff Wild; Roy Handler; Steven Marmalstein; Dan Maurio; Sarah Colonna; Jen Kirkman; Fortune Feimster; Josh Wolf
- Country of origin: United States
- Original language: English
- No. of seasons: 3
- No. of episodes: 24

Production
- Executive producers: Brad Wollack; Chelsea Handler; Jay Karas; Tom Brunelle
- Running time: 20 to 23 minutes; (excluding commercials)
- Production company: Borderline Amazing Productions

Original release
- Network: E!
- Release: March 6, 2011 – April 15, 2013

Related
- Chelsea Lately

After Lately is an American television comedy. The series depicts, in mockumentary style, the behind the scenes goings-on at the office of the late-night talk show Chelsea Lately. The cast is made up of the actual writers and performers of Chelsea Lately, who play themselves as they suffer the indignities and relish the perks of show business, bicker and argue over trivial and petty matters, compete for show air time and personal approval from Chelsea, and produce a nightly late-night cable comedy show. Celebrity guest stars regularly appear, playing parody versions of themselves, interacting with Chelsea and the cast. The series began airing on E! on March 6, 2011.

== Summary ==
After Lately is a faux reality show, purporting to expose the behind-the-scenes goings-on of Chelsea Handler's hit, late-night, E! network talk show, Chelsea Lately. In fact, it is a scripted comedy using a "show-about-a-show" concept, similar to The Larry Sanders Show (except that the show at the center of After Lately is a real show) and is, also, a satire of the personality flaws and skewed mindsets commonly associated with show business and celebrities. The performances are both scripted and improvised. The camera shots are intentionally meant to mimic a documentary-style, fly-on-the-wall point-of-view (a la, The Office and Parks and Recreation). The various cast members, writers, crew, associates, and even celebrity guests of Chelsea Lately are presented as an extended, dysfunctional 'family': pranking each other in childish ways; failed attempts to lie their way into gaining the favor of higher-status celebrities; bickering and arguing over mostly petty matters; and, constantly competing for show air time—and Chelsea's favor, while producing a nightly talk show. Handler, herself, appears in each episode: always portrayed as having an outwardly disdainful, domineering, and abusive—yet, secretly compassionate—attitude toward each staff member.

== Cast ==
- Chelsea Handler
- Brad Wollack
- Chris Franjola
- Chuy Bravo
- Heather McDonald
- Jeff Wild
- Sarah Colonna
- Steve Marmalstein
- Roy Handler
- Josh Wolf (seasons 1–2)
- Fortune Feimster (seasons 2–3)
- Jen Kirkman (seasons 2–3)

=== Guest stars ===
Guest stars for After Lately include: Reese Witherspoon, Jennifer Aniston, Justin Bieber, Jane Fonda, Dave Grohl, James Van Der Beek, Jay Leno, Ross Mathews, Jenny McCarthy, Sharon Osbourne, Giuliana Rancic, Tori Spelling, Antonio Sabàto Jr., Loni Love, Natasha Leggero, Gary Valentine, Drew Pinsky, Geri Jewell, Vicki Gunvalson, Kate Beckinsale, Charlize Theron, Kathie Lee Gifford, Monica Potter, Kevin Nealon, Melissa Etheridge, Giancarlo Stanton, Kim Kardashian, Khloe Kardashian, Kourtney Kardashian, Kris Jenner.

== Episodes ==
Season	Episodes	Originally released	
Season	Episodes	First released	Last released
1	8	March 6, 2011	April 24, 2011
2	8	November 27, 2011	January 29, 2012
3	8	February 25, 2013	April 15, 2013

=== Season 1 (2011) ===
No. overall	No. in season	Title	Original release date
1	1	"The List"	March 6, 2011
The staff of Chelsea Lately go into chaos when Chelsea realizes she needs more people to go with her on her trip to Cabo. With all the chaos going on, Chelsea just sits back and enjoys watching all the things her staff members will do just to get a ticket. Meanwhile, one of the workers brings their child to the office, which disrupts some of the other staff members. The 'Chelsea Lately Staff Stock' is introduced in this episode. U.S. Viewers: The premiere of After Lately averaged 1.2 million viewers.
2	2	"Whose Vagina is it, Anyway?!"	March 13, 2011
The staff of Chelsea Lately find a naked picture of Heather on the internet, which Heather worries about until she realizes that any press is good press. That is until the blogosphere believes it is a photo of Giuliana Rancic. Chelsea tries to figure out why production crew member Xiao Niu does not acknowledge her existence despite being his boss. Meanwhile, Chuy participates in a big brother – little brother program and brings in a guy off the street named "Catfish" who steals belongings from co-workers.
3	3	"A-List BFF"	March 20, 2011
Reese Witherspoon visits the Chelsea Lately offices, but the writers soon regret welcoming Reese when she starts annoying everyone. Chuy starts demanding perks from Chelsea, such as his own personal assistant. Heather feels sorry for one of the security guards when she buys him lunch, and when she tries to reciprocate, the guard refuses because he does not want to be involved in what he thinks is an affair.
4	4	"Flush-gate"	March 27, 2011
Sarah and Heather try to discover who has been using the women's toilet and not flushing, disrupting their normal work schedule. Chelsea's infamous "NOPE" board is introduced, and when Steve Marmalstein receives new shoes for having them put on the NOPE board, Heather goes out of her way to get free clothing. Gary Valentine and Loni Love guest star.
5	5	"Fired Up"	April 3, 2011
When Brad becomes upset at how the late-night maid Guadalupe acts on the job, he has her fired until everyone reveals that Guadalupe was Chelsea's favorite. The next day, when Chelsea reveals that she is going to stay late that day to give Guadalupe a "Get Well" gift basket because Guadalupe's son is in the hospital, Brad tries to get Guadalupe rehired.
6	6	"Weekend at Chelsea's"	April 10, 2011
When Heather has a fight with her husband, Chelsea invites her to stay at her house for the weekend. However, she soon regrets the invitation when Heather has her cougar friends (including Vicki Gunvalson) for over a pool/Botox party. Meanwhile, Jiffy worries about the possibility of being fired after he is caught on camera peeing in the staff parking lot.
7	7	"Crudité"	April 17, 2011
After Sarah Colonna gets a crudité platter for staff member Micah's birthday, Chelsea becomes extremely upset because she loves birthdays and that everyone should have a cake for their birthday. Meanwhile, Chelsea has hacked into Brad's computer and sent an e-mail to Ross Matthews, claiming that "Brad" is ready to come out of the closet and needs someone to talk to. Ross (and his partner Salvador) invite Brad over to their house for brunch, which ends up an awkward mess when Brad realizes that Chelsea has pranked him. Heather is in charge of a charity event for Chuy's "Little Nugget Foundation", a drug rehabilitation program in Chuy's hometown in Mexico, and requests that Chelsea be there. Chelsea invites Geri Jewell, one of Heather's impersonations, to the event as well.
8	8	"The Intervention"	April 24, 2011
Roy considers a job offer from Tori Spelling, one of Chelsea's favorite targets on her show, after he is not being treated with respect at the Chelsea Lately offices. Jiffy and Heather stage an intervention with Doctor Drew Pinsky because they think that Chris is abusing drugs. Justin Bieber guest stars.

=== Season 2 (2011–12) ===
No. overall	No. in season	Title	Original release date	US viewers (millions)
9	1	"Grandpa Franjola"	November 27, 2011	1.25
After Brad is rude to a fan with autism at a book signing, Jenny McCarthy tells him that he has pissed off the entire autistic community and he has to make a formal apology. Chris goes out on a date finds out that he might be a grandfather. Chelsea wants to buy Jen's friend's dog for 10 grand.
10	2	"Brad's Beautiful Penis"	December 4, 2011	1.07
When Sarah gets a glimpse of Brad's penis while walking by as he's changing clothes in his dressing room, things go awry as she tries to prove to Chelsea that Brad's penis is the complete opposite of what Chelsea thinks his entire body is: hopelessly ugly. Meanwhile, Jiffy gets blamed when Chelsea accidentally lets an internal email (insulting guest star Sharon Osbourne) go viral. Chelsea forces Jiffy to take the blame for her mistake, and apologize to the outraged Osbourne in person.
11	3	"Finding Jordan"	December 11, 2011	1.25
Brad takes Chelsea's differently-abled fan Jordan out on a night on the town to gain points with Chelsea. Heather gets jealous that the talent department takes the free gifts that companies send them to wear. Chelsea tasks Jiffy to deliver a stool sample to her doctor. Antonio Sabàto Jr. guest stars.
12	4	"The Book of More Moms"	December 18, 2011	0.93
Chelsea's assistant asks the group to assemble a "Tribute Book" with photos of them and their mothers for Chelsea's birthday. Chuy invites Brad, Heather and Jiffy to an appearance at a new golf course. Chris and Jen attend Roy's photoshoot for Playgirl.
13	5	"The PA Hole"	January 1, 2012	0.94
The writers struggle to deal with an increasingly lazy and cocky production assistant. Chris feuds with James Van Der Beek over which of them will wear a matching shirt on-air. Josh is dismayed to learn that his son thinks that Chuy is funnier than Josh is.
14	6	"Heather's Hickey"	January 8, 2012	1.23
Heather catches flak for getting too drunk at an office party. The guys try to figure out a contraption that Sarah ordered. Jen tries to get close to Dave Grohl.
15	7	"Sweet Home After Lately"	January 22, 2012	1.02
Reese Witherspoon returns to the Chelsea Lately offices so the writers can help her write a speech she is giving in Chelsea's honor, but she starts to bother Chelsea this time around while earning the staff's praise. Jen lies to Gary of HR to give Sarah a spot in front of the offices, leaving Brad angered that he has to use the parking garage. Roy gets upset when the writers like Chuy's salsa rather than his cooking.
16	8	"A Tale of Two Lisps"	January 29, 2012	1.71
Josh bets Jay Leno over the game at Ross' football party. Chelsea is the only one that enjoys her assistant's character with a lisp. Jiffy meets with Jane Fonda to discuss her coming on the show. Chelsea introduces the group to Jennifer Aniston, who has more to say behind Chelsea's back than expected.

=== Season 3 (2013) ===
No. overall	No. in season	Title	Original release date	US viewers (millions)
17	1	"Research & Annoy"	February 25, 2013	0.35
18	2	"Gay for Jiffy"	March 4, 2013	0.38
19	3	"How Chelsea Got Her Groove Back"	March 11, 2013	0.28
20	4	"Mrs. Handler, Are You Trying to Seduce Me?"	March 18, 2013	0.22
21	5	"Hey Tay-Shón, It's Me Chelsea"	March 25, 2013	0.25
22	6	"All Dogs Go to Heather"	April 1, 2013	0.26
23	7	"Tasted and Confused"	April 8, 2013	0.36
24	8	"Putting Up With the Kardashians"	April 15, 2013	0.34

== Production ==
After Lately is shown in a documentary style where cameras follow the staff members behind the scenes of Chelsea Lately, and many of the staff members sometimes have one-on-one time with the camera crew for Reality TV-style confessionals. Many of the stories told are inspired by actual events at the Chelsea Lately offices.

After Lately is executive produced by Chelsea Handler, Tom Brunelle and Jay Karas, Johnny Milord and Brad Wollack serve as Co-Executive Producers, in association with Borderline Amazing Productions. The first and second seasons each consisted of eight episodes airing on Sunday nights at 11 pm. Season two premiered on November 27, 2011 at 11pm.

On April 27, 2012, After Lately was renewed for a third season. Season 3 debuted on February 25, 2013 in its new time slot on Mondays at 10:30pm.

== Ratings ==
The series premiere averaged 1.2 million viewers and a .91 household rating. Season one averaged around one million viewers per episode and exceeded the E!'s primetime delivery by over +50%.

The season two premiere of After Lately recorded 1.254 million viewers, up 7% from the series premiere to set a new series high.

The season three premiere recorded 0.355 million viewers and a .2 household rating.
