= Christina Milian Turned Up =

- Genre: Reality television
- Starring: Christina Milian; Carmen Milian; Danielle Milian; Liz Milian
- Country of origin: United States
- Original language: English
- No. of seasons: 2
- No. of episodes: 15

Production
- Executive producers: Roy Bank; Kelsey Grammer; Stella Bulochnikov; Brian Sher; Larissa A.K. Matsson; Carmen Milian; Christina Milian
- Camera setup: Multiple
- Running time: 30 minutes (inc. ads)
- Production companies: Banca Studio; G3 Production; Lionsgate Television

Original release
- Network: E!
- Release: January 18, 2015 – January 12, 2016

Christina Milian Turned Up is an American reality documentary television series on E! that premiered on January 18, 2015. E! announced the series in September 2014 as a "docu soap [that] follows singer and actress Christina Milian’s career, love life, and her relationship with her Cuban-American family." However, Milian stated the series will not feature her love life, including no appearances by rumoured boyfriend Lil Wayne.

In April 2015, E! renewed the show for a second season, which premiered on November 3, 2015.

On September 21, 2016, Milian confirmed on her Snapchat that E! declined to pick up a third season.

== Episodes ==
Season	Episodes	Originally released	
Season	Episodes	First released	Last released
1	6	January 18, 2015	March 1, 2015
2	9	November 3, 2015	January 12, 2016

=== Season 1 (2015) ===
No. overall	No. in season	Title	Original release date	U.S. viewers (millions)
1	1	"Meet The Milians"	January 18, 2015	0.741
Christina searches for style inspiration at New York fashion week; Danielle and Richard fight.
2	2	"Apologies Are In Order"	January 25, 2015	0.838
Danielle hits a turning point in her marriage; Lizzy wants Christina to invest in a food truck.
3	3	"Let's Twerk It Out!"	February 8, 2015	0.672
Christina is resolved to make her butt bigger and weighs all options.
4	4	"Oh, Say Can You Sing"	February 15, 2015	0.406
Christina promises to perform the National Anthem at an LA Dodgers game, but loses her voice.
5	5	"Unhappy Campers"	February 22, 2015	0.588
Christina puts together a family camping trip, but tensions rise before the group even leaves home.
6	6	"A Milian's Emotions"	March 1, 2015	0.684
The family fight continues and unresolved issues cut the camping trip short.

=== Season 2 (2015–16) ===
No. overall	No. in season	Title	Original release date	U.S. viewers (millions)
7	1	"Like Me"	November 3, 2015	0.341
Christina shoots a music video for her new single. Lizzy has found a new calling and a new man. Danielle is pregnant with her second child but the doctors reveal troubling news.
8	2	"The French Disconnection"	November 10, 2015	0.376
Christina learns of news that puts her relationship with Wayne in jeopardy. Lizzy's plans for Dom's birthday end in disaster.
9	3	"Risky Business"	November 17, 2015	0.318
Christina mentors a young girl band, only to find out they may not be ready for the big time. Richard pursues his dreams of becoming a professional stuntman, despite Danielle’s concerns.
10	4	"Trouble in Paradise"	December 1, 2015	0.303
Danielle tells Dom about Lizzy's history of being a "Heartbreak Kid," which makes him question their future. Lizzy feels betrayed by Danielle, and questions her sister's intentions.
11	5	"Tee'd Off"	December 8, 2015	N/A
Christina invites Ceraadi to perform with her at the Rose Bowl, but their lack of commitment makes her question their dedication. Meanwhile, Lizzy is out for blood after Richard accuses her and Dom of sleeping with other people.
12	6	"Stop Attack"	December 15, 2015	N/A
Christina launches her new safety app, and opens up to the press for the first time about her own history as a victim of domestic abuse. Meanwhile, Dom attempts to make peace with Richard, but the gesture backfires; and Danielle becomes upset when Lizzy encroaches on her infomercial gig.
13	7	"Disfunction Junction"	December 29, 2015	N/A
Christina worries that her team isn't up to the task of prepping her We Are Pop Culture clothing store in time for the scheduled grand opening. Elsewhere, Richard blows up at Lizzy and Dom during a family dinner, prompting Danielle to have a meltdown.
14	8	"Goodbye to Love"	January 5, 2016	N/A
Dom leaves for France after a tearful goodbye; Danielle's relationship with Richard continues to deteriorate after he refuses to participate in a family function; and Christina worries she won't be able to pull off the store opening as the big day draws near.
15	9	"International Surprise"	January 12, 2016	N/A
In the Season 2 finale, tensions continue to rise as Christina prepares for the grand opening of her store. Richard realizes he needs to be strong for Danielle and seeks his father's advice. Meanwhile, Lizzy gets the surprise of a lifetime when Dom secretly flies back from France to ask her a very important question.

== Broadcast ==
The series premiered in the United States on E! on January 18, 2015 with a double episode at 10pm. The series premiered in Australia on the local version of E! on January 27, 2015.
