= Alone Together (TV series) =

American comedy series created by and starring Benji Aflalo and Esther Povitsky

- Genre: Sitcom
- Created by: Benji Aflalo; Esther Povitsky; Eben Russell
- Starring: Esther Povitsky; Benji Aflalo
- Country of origin: United States
- Original language: English
- No. of seasons: 2
- No. of episodes: 20

Production
- Executive producers: Andy Samberg; Akiva Schaffer; Jorma Taccone; Billy Rosenberg; Hunter Covington; Benji Aflalo; Esther Povitsky; Eben Russell; Becky Sloviter
- Producers: Jason Zaro; Adrien Finkle; Joanne Toll
- Production locations: Los Angeles, California
- Camera setup: Single-camera
- Running time: 22 minutes
- Production company: The Lonely Island

Original release
- Network: Freeform
- Release: January 10 – August 29, 2018

Alone Together is an American sitcom that was created by and starring Benji Aflalo and Esther Povitsky. Eben Russell co-created the series and executive produced alongside Aflalo and Povitsky. The series was also produced by The Lonely Island's Andy Samberg, Akiva Schaffer and Jorma Taccone. It follows two platonic best friends who attempt to find a foothold in Los Angeles. It premiered on January 10, 2018 on Freeform. The series' second season began airing on August 1, 2018.

On November 2, 2018, Freeform canceled the series after two seasons.

== Premise ==
Two millennial misfits strike up a platonic friendship in order to navigate life in vain and status-obsessed Los Angeles.

== Cast ==
=== Main ===
- Esther Povitsky as Esther, a woman from the Midwest who is trying to make it as a comedian
- Benji Aflalo as Benji, a trust fund kid from Beverly Hills who lives with his older brother

=== Recurring ===
- Edgar Blackmon as Jeff, Esther's and Benji's mutual friend
- Chris D'Elia as Dean, Benji's older brother
- Ginger Gonzaga as Alia, Benji's older sister
- Punam Patel as Tara, a friend from an acting class Esther previously took (season 2)

== Production ==
While working at The Comedy Store, Aflalo, a comedy writer and stand-up, met another relatively new comedian, Esther Povitsky. In 2015, Povitsky and Aflalo wrote, starred in, and self-produced the short film "Alone Together."

Development on the series was underway in April 2016. A pilot was greenlit in July 2016, and it was picked up to series by Freeform in December 2016. Chris D'Elia, Ginger Gonzaga, Edgar Blackmon, Hayley Marie Norman, Kamilla Alnes, Jim O'Heir and Justine Lupe guest star in the series' pilot.

The series was renewed for a second season by Freeform in October 2017, before the first season had even aired. Season 2 premiered on August 1, 2018. All ten episodes were released for immediate streaming on Hulu. Season 2 guest stars included Carmen Electra, Nikki Glaser, Seth Morris, and Fran Drescher.

Freeform cancelled the program on November 2, 2018 after two seasons. Alone Together did not garner a large viewership, with an average of 268,000 viewers per episode after seven days of DVR.

== Episodes ==
=== Season 1 (2018) ===
No. overall	No. in season	Title	Directed by	Written by	Original release date	Prod. code	U.S. viewers (millions)
1	1	"Pilot"	Daniel Gray Longino	Benji Aflalo & Esther Povitsky & Eben Russell	January 10, 2018 (Note: The pilot was made available for streaming on Freeform Go a week before its official air date: "Meet Benji And Esther From Alone Together". Freeform. Archived from the original on January 4, 2018.)	1001	0.37
2	2	"Road Trip"	Todd Biermann	Hunter Covington	January 17, 2018	1004	0.37
3	3	"Fertility"	Betsy Thomas	Amy Hubbs	January 24, 2018	1003	0.24
4	4	"Pop Up"	Kat Coiro	Sarah Peters	January 31, 2018	1005	0.21
5	5	"Dean Girls"	Tamra Davis	Caroline Goldfarb	February 7, 2018	1006	0.20
6	6	"Dinner Party"	Lauren Palmigiano	Mason Flink	February 14, 2018	1008	0.20
7	7	"The Big One"	Kat Coiro	Eben Russell	February 28, 2018	1002	0.22
8	8	"Sleepover"	Tamra Davis	Esther Povitsky	March 7, 2018	1007	0.13
9	9	"Music Video"	Amy York Rubin	Eben Russell & Dan Bailey	March 14, 2018	1010	0.15
10	10	"Property Management"	Tamra Davis	Benji Aflalo	March 21, 2018	1009	0.18

=== Season 2 (2018) ===
No. overall	No. in season	Title	Directed by	Written by	Original release date	Prod. code	U.S. viewers (millions)
11	1	"Crypto"	Ryan McFaul	Paul Mather	August 1, 2018	2001	0.21
12	2	"Pootie"	Jay Karas	Alex Blagg	August 1, 2018	2005	0.14
13	3	"Nurse Esther"	Tamra Davis	Amy Hubbs	August 8, 2018	2004	0.14
14	4	"Murder House"	Jay Karas	Esther Povitsky	August 8, 2018	2006	0.10
15	5	"Daypassers"	Tamra Davis	Eben Russell	August 15, 2018	2003	0.11
16	6	"A Drama Story"	Ryan McFaul	Shelly Gossman	August 15, 2018	2002	0.10
17	7	"Mom"	Sam Bailey	Ali Kinney	August 22, 2018	2008	0.20
18	8	"Dog Awards"	Erin Ehrlich	Caroline Goldfarb	August 22, 2018	2009	0.13
19	9	"Flashback"	Erin Ehrlich	Benji Aflalo	August 29, 2018	2007	0.09
20	10	"Big Bear"	Sam Bailey	Dan Bailey & Sam Clarke	August 29, 2018	2010	0.06

== Reception ==
On the review aggregator Rotten Tomatoes, the series has an approval rating of 62% based on 13 reviews, with an average rating of 5.9/10. The site's critical consensus reads, "Esther Povistky and Benji Alflalo's awkward charms and convincingly platonic chemistry work, though Alone Together's lack of urgency keeps its nihilistic tenderness from truly jelling." On Metacritic, which assigns a normalized rating, the series has a score 60 out of 100, based on 6 critics, indicating "mixed or average reviews".

=== Season 1 (2018) ===
Viewership and ratings per episode of Alone Together
No.	Title	Air date	Rating/share (18–49)	Viewers (millions)
1	"Pilot"	January 10, 2018	0.2	0.37
2	"Road Trip"	January 17, 2018	0.2	0.37
3	"Fertility"	January 24, 2018	0.1	0.24
4	"Pop Up"	January 31, 2018	0.1	0.21
5	"Dean Girls"	February 7, 2018	0.1	0.20
6	"Dinner Party"	February 14, 2018	0.1	0.20
7	"The Big One"	February 28, 2018	0.1	0.22
8	"Sleepover"	March 7, 2018	0.1	0.13
9	"Music Video"	March 14, 2018	0.1	0.15
10	"Property Management"	March 21, 2018	0.1	0.18

=== Season 2 (2018) ===
Viewership and ratings per episode of Alone Together
No.	Title	Air date	Rating/share (18–49)	Viewers (millions)
1	"Crypto"	August 1, 2018	0.1	0.21
2	"Pootie"	August 1, 2018	0.1	0.14
3	"Nurse Esther"	August 8, 2018	0.1	0.14
4	"Murder House"	August 8, 2018	0.0	0.10
5	"Daypassers"	August 15, 2018	0.1	0.11
6	"A Drama Story"	August 15, 2018	0.1	0.10
7	"Mom"	August 22, 2018	0.1	0.20
8	"Dog Awards"	August 22, 2018	0.1	0.13
9	"Flashback"	August 29, 2018	0.1	0.09
10	"Big Bear"	August 29, 2018	0.0	0.06
