= Opening Act =

American reality talent show

- Genre: Talent show
- Presented by: Olivia Lee
- Country of origin: United States
- Original language: English
- No. of seasons: 1
- No. of episodes: 8

Production
- Executive producers: Kary McHoul; Nigel Lythgoe; Simon Lythgoe; Steve Schnur
- Camera setup: Multi-camera
- Running time: 43 minutes (excluding commercials)
- Production company: Nigel Lythgoe Productions

Original release
- Network: E!
- Release: July 9 – September 4, 2012

Opening Act is an American reality talent show on E! that debuted on July 9, 2012.

== Premise ==
The series gives contestants, who are singers found via the internet, five days to prepare an opening act for a popular musical performer.

== Cast ==
- Nigel Lythgoe
- Antonina Armato
- Martina McBride
- Pete Wentz
- Nick Cooper
- Jason Derülo
- Olivia Lee

== Episodes ==
No.	Title	Original release date	U.S. viewers (millions)
1	"Arielle & Rod Stewart"	July 9, 2012	0.62
2	"TwentyForSeven & Gym Class Heroes"	July 16, 2012	0.31
3	"Kylie & Jason Aldean"	July 23, 2012	0.35
4	"Jono & Jason Mraz"	July 30, 2012	0.27
5	"Joy Island and LMFAO"	August 13, 2012	0.20
6	"Tanner & Brad Paisley"	August 20, 2012	0.23
7	"Gotham Citi & Nicki Minaj"	August 27, 2012	0.29
8	"Von & Lady Gaga"	September 4, 2012	0.38

== Broadcast ==
In Australia, the series premiered on September 25, 2012 on E! Australia.
