= Hollywood Cycle =

2015 American reality television series

- Genre: Reality
- Presented by: Nichelle Hines; Aaron Hines; Nick Hounslow; D.J. Nieto; Carmen Ortega; Chad Tepper
- Country of origin: United States
- Original language: English
- No. of seasons: 1
- No. of episodes: 6

Production
- Executive producers: Andrea Gorfolova; Jeff Hevert; Ross Breitenbach; Andrew Perry; Abby Ex; Nick Kriess
- Camera setup: Multiple
- Running time: 42 minutes
- Production companies: Tricon Films & Television

Original release
- Network: E!
- Release: July 7 – August 11, 2015

Hollywood Cycle is an American reality documentary television series that premiered on July 7, 2015, on E! television network. The reality show chronicles both the professional and personal lives of several instructors, including Nichelle Hines, Aaron Hines, and Nick Hounslow, as well as the trainees, who all work at the indoor cycling studio Cycle House in Los Angeles.

== Episodes ==
No.	Title	Original release date	U.S. viewers (millions)
1	"Welcome to Cycle House"	July 7, 2015	321,000
Instructor Aaron and trainee Shannon are more in love than ever. A brawl happens between Nichelle and Sarafine during a Cycle House Anniversary party and DJ comes to Nichelle’s defense.
2	"Circle Of Thrust"	July 14, 2015	282,000
Aaron, the Head Instructor, is offered a new position at Santa Monica locations. Aaron, however, does not consult with Nichelle which causes tension between them.
3	"Odd Man Out"	July 21, 2015	285,000
Shannon finds out that Aaron still may flirt with other women. Brandon's history with Nick is disclosed. Carmen's birthday party gets intense.
4	"Investor Crisis"	July 28, 2015	230,000
A rich fitness investor offers Nichelle a lucrative deal. Brandon is about to make a big move at the cycle studio. Carmen makes her third billboard debut in Hollywood.
5	"Ride Or Die"	August 4, 2015	299,000
Sarafina and Chad note the convenient timing of Shannon's relationship.
6	"Crash and Burn"	August 11, 2015	253,000
In the season's finale, a new instructor is crowned. Nichelle is unhappy with Adam and Lara not giving enough credit for her work.

== Broadcast ==
In Australia, the series premiered on the local version of E! on July 15, and July 12, 2015, in the United Kingdom.
