= New Money (TV series) =

- Genre: Reality
- Country of origin: United States
- Original language: English
- No. of seasons: 1
- No. of episodes: 6

Production
- Executive producers: Brent Montgomery; Will Nothacker
- Camera setup: Multiple
- Running time: 30 minutes
- Production company: Leftfield Pictures

Original release
- Network: E!
- Release: May 29 – June 26, 2015

New Money is an American reality television series that premiered on May 29, 2015 on the E! cable network. The six-part series documents how the extremely rich spend their money and the lifestyles they lead. The series is produced by Leftfield Pictures.

The series premiered in the United States on May 29, 2015 to 221,000 viewers. The opening episode lost 183,000 viewers from its lead-in The Soup. In Australia, the series premiered on June 3, 2015 on the Australian version of E!.

== Episodes ==
No.	Title	Original release date	U.S. viewers (millions)
1	"I'm Very Good at Spending My Husband's Money"	May 29, 2015	0.22
2	"The Bigger the House, the Smaller You Look"	June 5, 2015	0.31
3	"Our Net Worth Is...A Lot"	June 12, 2015	0.20
4	"Don't Go Jetskiing With 30 Pounds of Gold On"	June 19, 2015	0.16
5	"This Is an Aston Martin. The Car I Wanted Is Apparently Called a Bentley."	June 26, 2015	0.23
6	"Money Is Just Paper to Me"	June 26, 2015	0.20
