= Ksenija Lukich =

Serbian-Australian model and television presenter

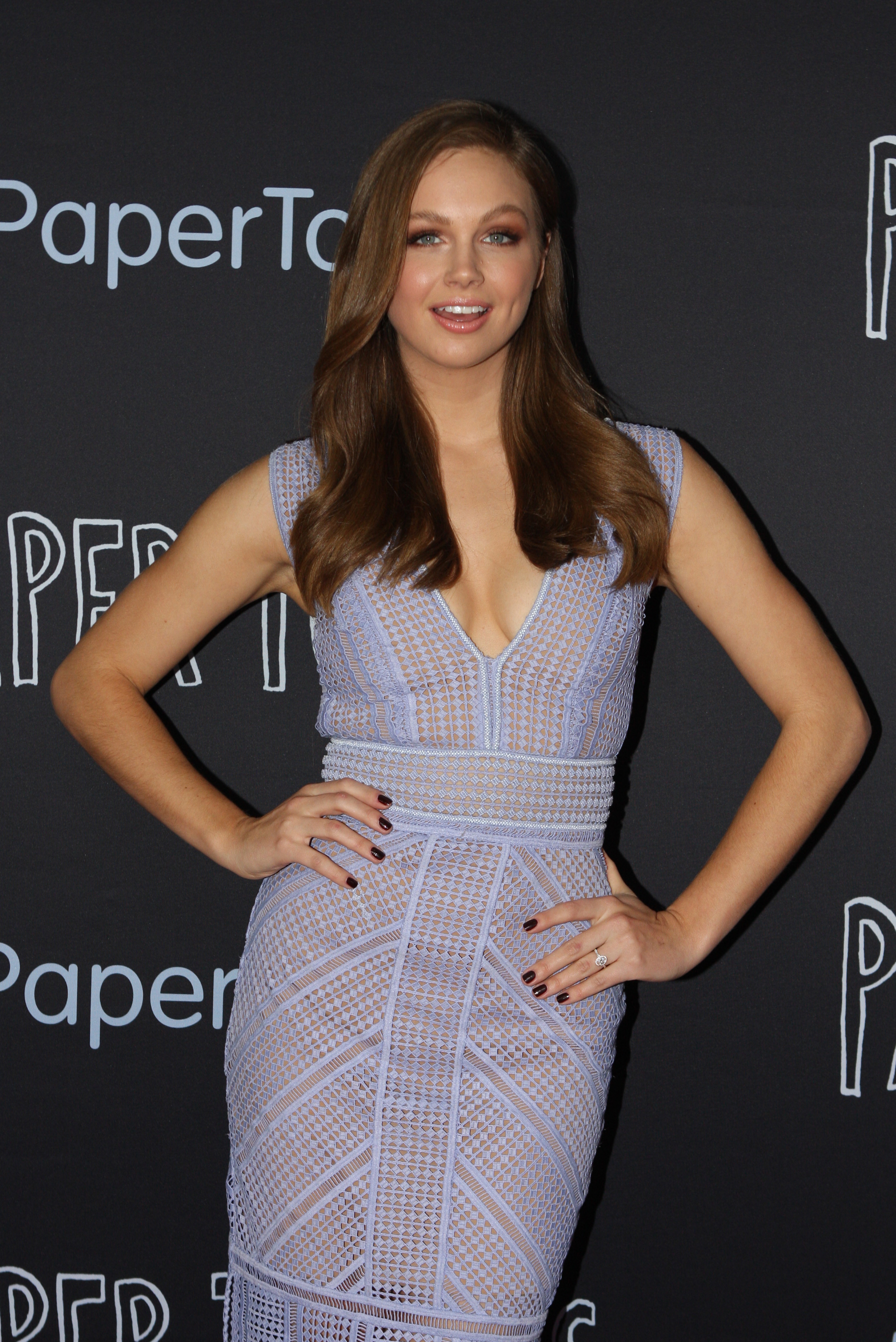
- Lukich in 2015
- Born: 12 February 1990 (age 36)
- Spouse: Dan Bragg (m. 2016)

Ksenija Lukich (Serbian: Ksenija Lukić) (born 12 February 1990) is an Australian model and television presenter. She is of Serbian descent.

Lukich grew up on the Northern Beaches and attended SCECGS Redlands and the University of Sydney. In 2014, she won a contest to become the host of E! Australia. She left E! In 2019.

On 23 October 2016, Lukich married Dan Bragg in a traditional Serbian Orthodox church service. They have two children.
