= Chelsea Lately =

American late-night comedy talk show

- Genre: Talk show Comedy
- Directed by: Jim Yukich
- Starring: Chelsea Handler
- Narrated by: Mike Rock
- Country of origin: United States
- Original language: English
- No. of seasons: 7
- No. of episodes: 1,048

Production
- Executive producers: Chelsea Handler; Tom Brunelle; Sue Murphy; Gary Snoodnian; Brad Wollack
- Producers: Daniel Isaacson; Tyler Spindel
- Camera setup: Multi-camera
- Running time: 22 to 24 minutes
- Production company: Borderline Amazing Productions

Original release
- Network: E!
- Release: July 16, 2007 – August 26, 2014

Related
- The Chelsea Handler Show; After Lately

Chelsea Lately is an American late-night comedy talk show created by Brody Stevens and hosted by comedian Chelsea Handler. The show was produced by Handler's production company (Borderline Amazing Productions), and taped its later years at Universal Studios Stage 1, in Universal City, California. It was broadcast on E!, with the first episode aired on July 16, 2007, and the 1048th, and last, on August 26, 2014. In American markets, the show aired at 11:00 p.m. Eastern and 8:00 p.m. Pacific time having been recorded at 3:30 p.m. PT, usually the same day.

On November 15, 2011, it was announced that the show's run had been extended through 2014. Handler's manager, Irving Azoff, stated that Handler would leave E! when her contract expired that year, thus ending Chelsea Lately.

== History ==
Handler previously starred on The Chelsea Handler Show, a sketch comedy show, that aired on E! in 2006. In 2007, she was approached to host her own late night talk show while she was dating the head of Comcast (E!'s parent company), but stated she was skeptical of the idea of her own show. Chelsea Lately premiered on July 17, 2007, at 11:30 p.m.

On October 15, 2012, Chelsea Lately relocated from the Westside Media Center Studios in West Los Angeles, a facility formerly used by E! sister network G4 to record Attack of the Show. That set was adapted to Chelsea Lately with only background changes and the addition of audience seating. The show's new set was at Stage 1 at Universal Studios Hollywood, which had been used by The Tonight Show with Conan O'Brien during its short seven-month run. When the series moved to a new studio, the opening theme was changed to a new version composed by Pharrell Williams.

The series had one spin-off, After Lately, a behind-the-scenes mockumentary, which premiered on March 6, 2011.

== Episode format ==
Original Chelsea Lately intertitle

Chelsea Lately was presented in a half-hour format, and was broadcast Monday through Friday at 11:00 p.m ET/PT, although the Friday show was frequently a re-run. Chelsea Lately opens cold and Handler performed a short stand-up monologue. The routine was usually focused on a topic from pop culture or current events, and sometimes included a video clip or other visual aid. Over the opening credits, announcer Mike Rock presented the topics of discussion and the show's guests, then made a comment about something totally irrelevant.

After the open, Handler introduced the round table panel of three guests consisting of some combination of comedians, actors, or staff members. She lastly introduces the show regular, her assistant Chuy Bravo (born Jesus Melgoza) who sat in his own chair near the edge of the studio's stage. Handler then discussed the goings on in pop culture with the round table members, occasionally including Chuy whose comments are always one-liner jokes. After the round table ends, if there is a sketch in the episode, it was shown next. Then, after returning from a commercial break, Handler interviewed a celebrity guest (or guests) for about six minutes each show. The show then closed with either another very short monologue (essentially Handler delivering a one-liner) or with a small segment like "Fat Baby" with pictures shown for comedic value. Handler and Chuy then usually interacted with the audience as the closing credits and music plays.

== Round table regulars ==
- Tone Bell
- Bill Bellamy
- Guy Branum
- Matt Braunger
- Kurt Braunohler
- John Caparulo
- Liz Carey
- Sarah Colonna
- Lavell Crawford
- Whitney Cummings
- Thomas Dale
- Dov Davidoff
- James Davis
- Fortune Feimster
- Greg Fitzsimmons
- Chris Franjola
- Ron Funches
- Ben Gleib
- Chris Hardwick
- Kevin Hart
- Grace Helbig
- Moshe Kasher
- Kerri Kenney-Silver
- Jen Kirkman
- Jo Koy
- Bobby Lee
- Natasha Leggero
- Dan Levy
- Loni Love
- Mo Mandel
- Joe Matarese
- Ross Mathews
- Dan Maurio
- Julian McCullough
- Heather McDonald
- T. J. Miller
- Brent Morin
- Arden Myrin
- Greg Proops
- Mary Lynn Rajskub
- April Richardson
- Ron G
- Nico Santos
- Betsy Sodaro
- Brody Stevens
- Ryan Stout
- Claire Titelman
- Jeff Wild
- Josh Wolf
- Brad Wollack
- Ali Wong
- Dustin Ybarra
- Michael Yo

== Ratings ==
As of 2011, Chelsea Lately averaged 960,000 viewers per episode. Between 2010 and 2013, her audience declined 32 percent, to an average 572,000 viewers.

As of October 2011, the highest-rated episode of Chelsea Lately garnered 1.8 million viewers: this was the October 10, 2011, episode hosted by Ross Mathews featuring Kendra Wilkinson and Hank Baskett, following the Kardashian wedding special.

Lindsay Lohan's guest host appearance on Chelsea Lately became the most watched episode since October 2012 by acquiring 890,000 total viewers.

For January–October 2013, Chelsea Lately attracted $30.3 million in advertising for an audience whose median age was 42.8.

From 2012 to 2013, viewership decreased from 613,000 to 571,000.

The live hour-long series finale aired August 26, 2014, and was viewed by 1.003 million viewers for a 0.4 share in the 18-49 demographic.

== Guest hosts ==
Due to sickness, injury or holidays, Handler was unable to host some episodes, calling for guest hosts to stand in. In the past, frequent "round table" panelists Ross Mathews, Josh Wolf and Fortune Feimster have guest-hosted, with Mathews receiving very positive reviews.

After July 2012, there were several celebrity guest hosts during various episodes:

- Comedian/actor Wanda Sykes guest-hosted on July 30, 2012, while Handler was in London.
- Comedic actor Kevin Hart guest-hosted on July 31 and August 1, 2012, while Handler was in London.
- Actor/comedian Dax Shepard guest-hosted on August 2, 2012, while Handler was in London.
- Australian comedic actress Rebel Wilson guest-hosted on September 7, 2012. Wilson's time as guest host was not due to Handler's unavailability to shoot the episode, but rather at Wilson's request to host. Handler reversed her role and was the celebrity guest interviewed by Wilson on this episode.
- As part of the show's "Celebrity Guest Host Week", the first week of December 2012 had episodes guest-hosted by television personality Amanda De Cadenet, actress/singer Kristin Chenoweth, comedic actress Casey Wilson, and musician Dave Grohl.
- In February 2013, Grohl returned to host for a week that included an interview with Elton John.
- The three Kardashian sisters, Kourtney, Kim, and Khloé, and their mother Kris Jenner guest hosted on April 8, 2013. This was a planned event, though it's unclear if it was arranged by Handler and the Kardashians or by the mother network where they all work. Khloé has since returned on other occasions to guest host the show.
- Actress Lindsay Lohan guest-hosted on August 5, 2013, only six days after being released from her court-ordered 90-day incarceration period.
- Actresses Gabourey Sidibe and Mary McCormack have also guest-hosted.

== Specials and spin-offs ==
=== After Lately ===
After Lately was a semi-scripted parody of a reality show, in the vein of shows such as The Larry Sanders Show and Curb Your Enthusiasm, in which the various cast members, guests, writers, crew, and even 'hangers-on' of Chelsea Lately are shown bickering and arguing over mostly trivial and petty matters, and competing for show air time and personal approval from Chelsea. Handler herself usually appears in very few scenes of the program and is always portrayed as having open and utter disdain for everyone beneath her. The series premiered on March 6, 2011, and consisted of eight episodes. After Lately was renewed for a second season on May 5, 2011, and for a third season on April 27, 2012.

=== Comedians of Chelsea Lately ===
A special titled Comedians of Chelsea Lately premiered on August 14, 2009, and lasted four weeks. The special consisted of Chelsea Lately round-table regulars such as Loni Love, Jo Koy, and others performing their comedy standup routines. The standup routines lasted for about 6-to-9 minutes in length. The first airing of the special had round-table regulars Guy Branum, Sarah Colonna, and Chris Franjola performing.

=== Chelsea Lately Bloopers ===
A Chelsea Lately special entitled Chelsea Lately Bloopers aired on December 22, 2009. It featured new bloopers, deleted scenes, and outtakes from the round table and guest interviews.

== Show controversy ==
During the June 20, 2011 episode, while discussing Amy Winehouse's poorly received performance at a concert in Belgrade, Handler read a statement by Serbian Defense Minister Dragan Šutanovac calling Winehouse's performance a "shame and a disappointment". Handler then stated, "Well, so is your country". The comment drew criticism, with requests for Handler to apologize for the comment. A Facebook page and change.org petition were also created calling for a boycott of Handler and E! until a public apology was made.

On June 25, 2011, Serbian Ambassador to the United States Vladimir Petrović sent a letter to Bonnie Hammer, president of NBCUniversal Cable (which oversees the E! network), describing Handler's act as "inappropriate, distasteful, and just plain bad humor".

Handler did not officially comment on the matter, but has on a number of occasions acknowledged on the show that she is no longer well received in Serbia.

According to an E! rep, a false request was reported in January 2013 claiming Comcast (which owns NBC and E!) warned Handler and the show's staff not to make any more jokes about the Today hosts.

== Post-show criticism ==
Six months after the show concluded, Handler made negative remarks about her time at E! during an interview about her new project with Netflix. "It's such a different relationship than with E!; it's nice to be involved in a show where I do respect their opinions. It's like going out with a guy that you're proud to be seen with," she said in February 2015. Handler also said that, by the second season of Chelsea Lately, she had already grown tired of discussing tabloid fodder, in particular her E! network costars from Keeping Up with the Kardashians. "I just don't want to ever have to see that again. I don't care. I don't care about that."

== Awards and nominations ==
Year	Result	Award	Category
2009	Winner	Teen Choice Award	Choice Late-Night Talk Show
2010	Nominated	People's Choice Awards	Television Talk Show

== See also ==
- The Chelsea Handler Show
- Chelsea, Handler's later Netflix series
- List of late-night American network TV programs
