= Catt Sadler =

American talk show host (born 1974)

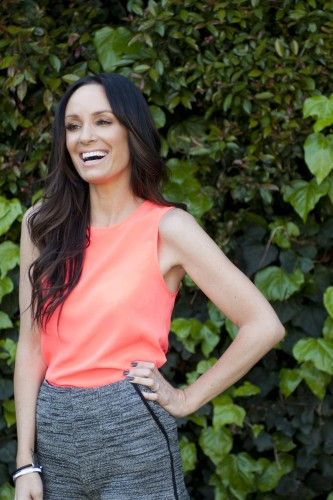
- Born: August 24, 1974 (age 52); Martinsville, Indiana, U.S.
- Occupation: Entertainment reporter
- Years active: 1997–present
- Spouses: Kyle Boyd (m. 2000; div. 2008) Rhys David Thomas (m. 2011; div. 2016)
- Children: 2

Catt Sadler (born August 24, 1974) is an American entertainment reporter who is best known for her work in E! News, E! News Weekend and Daily Pop. She previously co-hosted the network's The Daily 10 before its cancellation.

== Early life ==
Sadler was born in Martinsville, Indiana.

== Career ==
Before finishing college, Sadler was hired by WXIN, the Fox affiliate in Indianapolis to host the weekly segment "Youth Matters". She then hosted a short lived house music dance show called "The Groove" on WXIN. After working in local news for about a year, she moved to California.

After appearing as an extra in a few VH1 spoofs in Hollywood, Sadler got her first broadcasting job as an entertainment reporter in San Francisco in 1997 at KBWB/KNTV in San Jose, California, for their entertainment news segments. For four years she hosted a nightly lifestyle segment called "The Bay Beat".

In 2001, she moved back to Indiana where she returned to WXIN to co-anchor the station's morning newscast. She also hosted the Hoosier Lottery's Hoosier Millionaire show, which became the longest-running syndicated lottery game show in the country. During this time, she also served as the official emcee for the NBA's Indiana Pacers for the 2003–04 season. In 2005, Sadler gave birth to her second son. Sadler and her family returned to Los Angeles in 2006 when she was named host of The Daily 10 on E! alongside Sal Masekela and Debbie Matenopoulos.

Sadler continued acting in Los Angeles. She played herself in Judd Apatow's Knocked Up, and appeared on General Hospital and Night Shift. She also starred in the Red Jumpsuit Apparatus music video, "You Better Pray", playing the dancing librarian.

In 2010, Sadler joined the extended hour-long E! News with Ryan Seacrest and Giuliana Rancic. She also serves as host of several E! Live from the Red Carpet events, covering the Academy Awards, Golden Globes, and Emmys.

In May 2017, E! News launched a new daytime talk show called Daily Pop, with Sadler as one of three hosts.

In December 2017, Sadler left E! News after learning that her co-host Jason Kennedy was earning "double" her salary.

Sadler owns her own production company, Love Bug Entertainment. She hosts the weekly podcast "It Sure is a Beautiful Day" in association with Dear Media.

Sadler also regularly hosts the Vanity Fair Oscars Red Carpet Show. She held this position in 2018, 2019, 2020 and 2022.

== Charity work ==
Sadler is the international spokesperson for the Women Like Us Foundation, an organization her mother co-created after writing a book of the same name. In 2010, Sadler founded a local chapter – Women Like Us Hollywood.

== Personal life ==
Sadler married her college sweetheart, fashion executive Kyle Boyd, in 2001. They have two sons, Austin (2001) and Arion (2005).

Sadler met Brett Jacobson over Memorial Day 2009 at the Indianapolis 500. Five months later in October, they were engaged; but one week later ended their engagement but continued dating.

Sadler began dating British film producer Rhys David Thomas after meeting at a charity event in Los Angeles in May 2010. She and Thomas married on October 23, 2011, in a private ceremony at the Palazzo Hotel in Las Vegas. In March 2016, Sadler filed for divorce from Thomas.
