= Michael Yo =

American comedian and actor (born 1974)

- Born: November 20, 1974 (age 51); Houston, Texas, U.S.
- Occupations: Actor; comedian; television host
- Spouse: Claire Elise
- Website: michaelyo.com

Michael Yo Simmons (born November 20, 1974) is an American actor, stand-up comedian, and television host who co-hosted The Insider on CBS, and currently hosts Yo Show on Yahoo! TV. Yo also appears regularly on the comedy panel of Chelsea Lately, as a guest host for The Talk on CBS, and as pop culture commentator on Showbiz Tonight. Michael played football for the University of Arkansas, but his football career was cut short due to multiple concussions.

His film credits include Losing Control, The Cookout 2, and Sofia Coppola's The Bling Ring.

== Career ==
Yo previously worked as a correspondent for E! News, The Daily 10, and Extra. He coached Kourtney and Khloé Kardashian as radio DJs for their show Kourtney & Khloé Take Miami on E!.

In 2001, he appeared in a season 1 episode of Fear Factor in which contestants had to free fall from a hotel window hundreds of feet high, eat sheep's eyes and hang upside down in a water tank.

Yo started a podcast together with comedian Jo Koy on July 23, 2013, called The Michael Yo and Jo Koy Show.

In November 2018, it was announced that Yo's family comedy (inspired by his own life) was in development at Fox which he would star, co-write and produce.

On April 9, 2019, February 27, 2020, and May 12, 2020, he appeared on The Joe Rogan Experience.

He appeared on season 15 of America's Got Talent. Performing stand-up comedy, he received a yes from all four judges and advanced to the next round, but was eventually eliminated in the Quarter-Finals.

Since 2021, Yo and news correspondent Nikki Novak have served as the hosts of Nexstar Media Group's annual New Year's Eve special from Las Vegas.

In 2022, he appeared on the Netflix baking competition Is It Cake? as a judge.

On September 8, 2025, he began hosting the new game show Scrambled Up. In July 2026, the show was renewed for a second season, set to premiere on September 14, 2026.

== Personal life ==
Yo was born on November 20, 1974, in Houston, Texas, to an African-American father and Korean mother. Yo's parents met while his father, a United States army veteran, was stationed in South Korea. He currently resides in Los Angeles and has described Miami as being his "second hometown".

When asked about his mixed Korean and African American ancestry in a 2012 interview with Campus Activities Magazine, Yo stated that being biracial in the United States is "a uniquely relatable and American experience in life". In that same interview, Yo stated that he views comedy as not just "one-liners and punchlines", but a form of "story telling and [making real connections] with the audience."
