= Lauren Scruggs =

Lauren Scruggs may refer to:

- Lauren Scruggs (blogger)
- Lauren Scruggs (fencer)
