= The Daily 10 =

- The Daily 10 promo shot & logo
- Also known as: The D10
- Genre: Infotainment
- Presented by: Sal Masekela; Catt Sadler; Debbie Matenopoulos (2006-2009)
- Country of origin: United States
- Original language: English

Production
- Camera setup: Multi-camera
- Running time: 22–24 minutes
- Production company: E! Entertainment Television

Original release
- Network: E!
- Release: March 27, 2006 – October 1, 2010

The Daily 10 (also known as The D10) is an American daily television entertainment news show that aired on cable channel E! from March 2006 to October 2010. Hosts count down the top ten entertainment news stories of the day.

== Segments ==
In addition to entertainment news, The Daily 10 featured segments that cover fashion, music and movie reviews. Regular segments include: "The Lyon's Den" in which resident movie critic, Ben Lyons reviews upcoming films. "Flashy or Trashy", celebrity fashion critiques by Robbie Laughlin, and "Fashion Trends" with Amanda Luttrell Garrigus.

Every Friday, the show featured rapper Infinite-1 performing the Hollywood Rap-Up.

Other regular segments included "Fashion Round-Up", "Quick Hitters", "Who wore it better?" "True or False", "Now Hear This", and "Spotted."

On weekends, The Daily 10 was compiled of news and segments from the previous week.

== On-air staff ==
=== Anchors ===
- Sal Masekela - anchor (2006–2010)
- Catt Sadler - anchor (2006–2010)
- Debbie Matenopoulos - anchor (2006–2009)

=== Correspondents ===
- Ben Lyons - film critic/correspondent (2006–2010)
- Clinton Sparks - music correspondent (2007–2010)
- Jason Kennedy - fill-in anchor (2006–2010)
- Ashlan Gorse - fill-in anchor (2008–2010)
- Kristina Guerrero - fill-in anchor (2008–2010)
- Amy Paffrath - correspondent/fill-in anchor (2010)
- Robbie Laughlin - fashion correspondent (2006–2010)
- Amanda Luttrell Garrigus - fashion correspondent (2006–2010)
- Michael Yo - celebrity correspondent (2007–2010)
- Damien Fahey - fill-in anchor (2010)
- Michael Catherwood - fill-in anchor (2010)
- Morgan Webb - fill-in anchor (2010)

== Cancellation ==
On September 27, 2010, E! announced that it had cancelled The Daily Ten after four years. The final edition of the program aired on October 1. E! had previously announced on September 21 that its flagship entertainment news program E! News would revert to its previous hour-long format on October 25 (reruns of E! reality programs such as Keeping Up with the Kardashians aired in the three weeks prior to the expansion of E! News). E! News later incorporated some of The Daily 10's featured segments and personalities on the program.
