= E! News =

American entertainment news operation

- Presented by: Keltie Knight; Justin Sylvester
- Country of origin: United States
- Original language: English
- No. of episodes: 7,500+

Production
- Running time: 60 minutes (2010–2019); 30 minutes (1991–2010; 2020–2025)

Original release
- Network: E!
- Release: September 1, 1991 – September 25, 2025

E! News, previously known as E! News Daily and E! News Live, is the entertainment news operation for the cable network E! in the United States. Its former on-air weekday newscast debuted on September 1, 1991, and primarily reports on celebrity news and gossip, along with previews of upcoming films and television shows, regular segments about all of those three subjects, along with overall film and television industry news. The linear operation was cancelled on September 25, 2025.

== Overview ==
E! News logo used from 1991 to 2012

The program first aired on September 12, 1991. It was originally hosted by Dagny Hultgreen. It features stories and gossip about celebrities as well as the film, music, and television industries. Since its launch, it has broadcast under a variety of formats, at one point even airing live during the mid-2000s (at this time, the show was named E! News Live). Starting in 2006, it was hosted by Ryan Seacrest and Giuliana Rancic. In April 2012, Seacrest was replaced by Jason Kennedy. Rancic temporarily left the show on maternity leave in August 2012 due to the birth of her first son (through a surrogate), though she reassured viewers that she would return under a new three-year agreement to E! News and Fashion Police after her leave; Catt Sadler took over her anchoring duties, and eventually became a main anchor as Rancic reduced her duties over time. From 2006 until late 2010, The Daily 10, hosted by Sal Masekela, Sadler, and at one point Debbie Matenopoulos, lead out of E! News.

On September 21, 2010, E! announced the cancellation of The Daily 10. At this time, it was announced that E! News would be expanded to a one-hour format. The expansion became effective beginning on October 25, 2010. The series also debuted a new news set and began broadcasting in high definition. Some talent previously featured on The Daily 10, including Catt Sadler, Clinton Sparks and Robbie Laughlin, were integrated into E! News, along with the addition of a segment called The Daily 10 Take and the inclusion of some former Daily 10 segments.

The E! News program was dark on major holidays, including Memorial Day, Independence Day, Thanksgiving, and Christmas, with special pre-taped programs, the show's weekend edition or other E! programs airing instead, depending on where the holiday fell.

In December 2017, Catt Sadler departed the network upon learning she was underpaid compared to her male counterpart, Jason Kennedy. In a statement to People, an E! spokesperson claimed the network 'compensates employees fairly and appropriately based on their roles, regardless of gender'.

In August 2019, it was announced that at the start of 2020, the E! News newscast would move to New York, along with the launch of a companion program, Pop of the Morning. It would become a morning program airing live at 7 a.m. Eastern, though at the peril of being too early for West Coast audiences at 4 a.m. Pacific. The new iteration of E! News would originate from Studio 6E at 30 Rockefeller Plaza. The move was done to allow the network to become a stop on the common New York morning show circuit, and to allow for more vertical integration promotion for NBCUniversal programming and attractions in an hour where NBC's Today is usually exclusively devoted to hard news.

In October 2019, Rancic announced that she would be resigning her anchor position and staying in Los Angeles, and remain with the network for red carpet coverage, citing that she wanted to be more hands-on with her family and business interests in Chicago. Kennedy announced that he too would be leaving the show, but would remain with the network as the host of a new Los Angeles celebrity home-based interview series, In The Room. The last show from Los Angeles aired on November 15, 2019.

On December 5, 2019, it was announced that Lilliana Vazquez and Scott Tweedie would be the new co-anchors of the New York-based morning iteration of E! News which began airing on January 6, 2020. On March 13, 2020, it was announced that effective immediately, all of E!'s studio programming would go on an indefinite hiatus due to the COVID-19 pandemic. On August 5, 2020, E! canceled both New York-based shows, along with In The Room, one of the first of many program and employee cuts and staff realignments announced across NBCUniversal that week. E! has continued to maintain the E! News website, and its social media pages, including The Rundown on Snapchat Discover.

On October 20, 2022, E! announced that E! News would be revived as a late-night entertainment news program and would return to the E! network after a two-year hiatus; Adrienne Bailon-Houghton and Justin Sylvester (the latter of whom would return to the show for the revival) would serve as co-hosts. The revival premiered on November 14, 2022. On October 31, 2023, Bailon-Houghton announced she was resigning as co-anchor due to wanting to spend more time with her family and living on the East Coast.

On July 24, 2025, it was announced that the linear TV run of E! News will be cancelled on September 25, 2025, after 34 years. The website and social media run will remain intact.

== On-air staff ==
=== Current on-air staff ===
==== Anchors ====
- Keltie Knight — anchor (2024–2025); previously chief correspondent (2022–2024)
- Justin Sylvester – anchor (2022–2025); previously correspondent (2016–2020)

==== Correspondents ====
- Jason Kennedy – anchor/correspondent (2005–2019, 2023–2025)
- Will Marfuggi – correspondent (2013–2020, 2024–2025)
- Francesca Amiker — correspondent (2022–2025)
- Carolina Bermudez — correspondent (2022–2025)
- Courtney Lopez — correspondent (2022–2025)
- Emily Curl — correspondent (2024–2025)

=== Former on-air staff ===
- David Adelson – correspondent (1991–2005)
- Greg Agnew – correspondent/Sr. Producer/Breaking News Anchor (1991–2002)
- Jules Asner – anchor/correspondent (1996–2003)
- Ken Baker – chief correspondent (2008–2017)
- Adrienne Bailon-Houghton – anchor (2022–2023)
- Melanie Bromley – Chief news correspondent (2012–2020)
- John Burke – anchor/correspondent (2004–2005)
- David Burtka – correspondent (2012)
- Ted Casablanca – "The Awful Truth" (1996–2012)
- Carissa Culiner – correspondent (2014–2020, now at CMT)
- Alisha Davis – anchor/correspondent (2004–2005)
- Kristin dos Santos – "Watch With Kristin" (2001–2019; later with E! For Red Carpet coverage)
- Jason Feinberg – correspondent (2002–2005, now at KVVU-TV in Las Vegas)
- Bianca Ferrare – anchor/correspondent (1994–1995)
- Ali Fedotowsky – correspondent (2013–2015)
- Jesse Giddings – correspondent (2013–2015)
- Ashlan Gorse – correspondent/"E! News Now" anchor (2008–2013)
- Linda Grasso – correspondent (1996–2004)
- Kristina Guerrero – correspondent (2008–2014)
- Zuri Hall – correspondent (2015–2019, later at Access Hollywood)
- Samantha Harris – correspondent (2005–2008, later at The Insider and Entertainment Tonight, now back at Extra)
- Cindy Hom - correspondent (?–?)
- Dagny Hultgreen – anchor/correspondent (1991–1993)
- Terrence J – anchor/correspondent (2012–2015)
- Steve Kmetko – anchor/correspondent (1994–2002)
- Erin Lim – correspondent (2015–2020; still with E! as host of The Rundown on Snapchat)
- Lynda Lopez – correspondent (2003)
- Ben Lyons – film critic (2006–2011; later at Extra)
- Kristin Malia – correspondent (1997–2008)
- Marc Malkin – correspondent (2006–2017)
- Maria Menounos – anchor (2015–2017, later at Variety)
- Eleanor Mondale – correspondent (1997, deceased)
- Todd Newton – anchor/correspondent (1995–2007)
- Amy Paffrath – correspondent/"E! News Now" anchor (2009–2011, later at TV Guide Network)
- Nina Parker – correspondent (2018–2020)
- Alicia Quarles – correspondent (2012–2015; later at Daily Mail TV)
- Giuliana Rancic – anchor/correspondent (2002–2015, 2018–2019; later host of Red Carpet Coverage on E!)
- Catt Sadler – anchor/correspondent (2010–2017)
- Melana Scantlin – "E! News Now" anchor (2009–2011)
- Sibley Scoles – correspondent (2015–2018; later at Access Hollywood)
- Ryan Seacrest – anchor (2006–2012, later co-host of Live with Kelly and Ryan, now host of Wheel of Fortune)
- Patrick Stinson – correspondent (1997–2005, later at TV Guide Network, now at ReelzChannel)
- Gina St. John – anchor/correspondent (1997–1999)
- Kathleen Sullivan – anchor/correspondent (1995–1996)
- Scott Tweedie – anchor (2020)
- Lilliana Vazquez – anchor (2020)
- Michael Yo – celebrity correspondent (2008–2011, later at Extra and The Insider, now host of Scrambled Up)

== Broadcast ==
=== United States ===
The show aired weeknights at 7 p.m. until November 15, 2019, with reruns airing at 11 p.m. ET until 2018. An hour-long weekend edition was also produced, consisting of mostly rebroadcasts of stories aired during the weekday editions, airing on Saturdays at 10 a.m. ET; it was discontinued in 2016. As of 2020, the show aired weekday mornings at 7 a.m. ET.

=== International ===
In the UK the show airs weekdays at 8 a.m., 9 a.m., 4 p.m. and 7 p.m. In Europe, excluding the UK, E! News is often edited into a 30-minute version, but the Hour version is aired at 5 p.m. and 8 p.m. CET. The show also keeps changing airing times from week to week. During August 2009, it was only airing once a day at 2:25 a.m. CET.

The German version is produced by Alexander von Roon and broadcast on the Sky network.

In the Philippines, the show airs on ETC after the US Telecast Tuesday to Saturday 10:00-11:00 p.m. with replays at 1:00-2:00 p.m.

In India, the show airs on Zee Café at 6:00 p.m from Monday to Friday.

== International versions ==
=== Latin American ===
In Latin America the show was presented by Daniela Kosán and Renato López. Although E! News Latin America had different anchors, the video clips were the same. The show was cancelled in late 2008 and as of May 20, 2009 the show has been replaced by its American counterpart, with a two-minute recap of Latin American entertainment news retained, along with a 'week in review' half-hour program on Thursday nights. Both were hosted by Renato López until his death in 2016.

=== Asia ===
Introduced in 2010, E! News Asia was a weekly round-up of entertainment stories from Hollywood and Asia, formerly anchored by Dominic Lau and Marion Caunter. Now produced as short form content, E! News Asia is currently hosted by Yvette King, with correspondents Raymond Gutierrez in the Philippines and Elizabeth and Maria Rahajeng in Indonesia. E! News Asia is available in 15 countries around the Asian region.

=== Canada ===
In Canada, in addition to the U.S. version, a weekly Canadian program titled E! News Weekend aired from 2008 to 2009 on the E! broadcast system owned by Canwest. This was a weekly 30-minute program hosted by Jason Ruta and Arisa Cox from the Hard Rock Café in downtown Toronto. The broadcast service ceased operations in August 2009, and this program was not carried over to the unaffiliated cable channel which picked up the E! brand in late 2010.

The aforementioned E! system was unique in that it was transmitted through local broadcast stations which produced and aired their own local newscasts, similar to other North American broadcast networks – however, these programs specifically did not carry the E! News brand. For example, the system's flagship station CHCH-DT simply titled its newscasts CHCH News. However, this was an anomaly among Canadian networks which by that point had all, apart from E!, adopted network-based branding (CTV News, etc.) for their stations' local newscasts (even the Canadian E! network, under its previous branding as "CH", had used such branding).
