= A. O. Scott =

American journalist, film critic (born 1966)

A.O. Scott
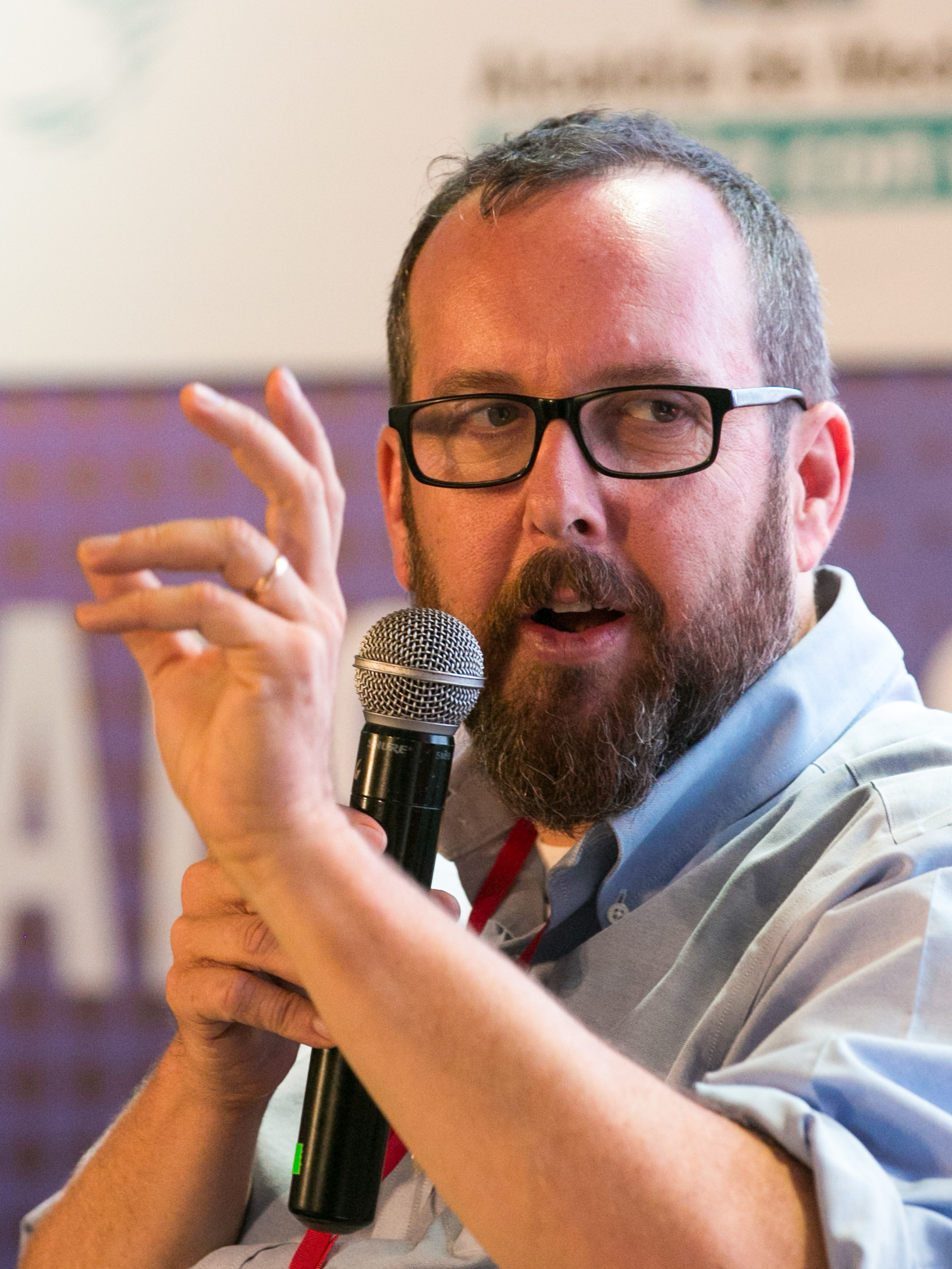
- Scott in 2016
- Born: Anthony Oliver Scott; July 10, 1966 (age 60); Northampton, Massachusetts, U.S.
- Other name: Tony Scott
- Education: Harvard University (BA)
- Occupations: Film critic; literary critic; author
- Years active: 1989–present
- Spouse: Justine Henning (m. 1991)
- Children: 2
- Mother: Joan Wallach Scott
- Relatives: Eli Wallach (great-uncle); Anne Jackson (great-aunt)

Anthony Oliver Scott (born July 10, 1966) is an American journalist and cultural critic, known for his film and literary criticism. After starting his career at The New York Review of Books, Variety, and Slate, he began writing film reviews for The New York Times in 2000, and became the paper's chief film critic in 2004, a title he shared with Manohla Dargis. In 2023, he moved to The New York Times Book Review.

== Early life and education ==
Scott was born on July 10, 1966, in Northampton, Massachusetts. Both of his parents were professors. His mother, Joan Wallach Scott, is the Harold F. Linder Professor at the School of Social Science in the Institute for Advanced Study in Princeton, New Jersey, and has Jewish origins. His father, Donald Scott, was a professor of American history at the City University of New York. He is a great nephew of the married acting couple Eli Wallach and Anne Jackson (his maternal grandfather was Eli's brother). He attended public schools in Providence, Rhode Island, including Classical High School, before graduating magna cum laude from Harvard College in 1988 with a degree in literature.

Asked what pointed him towards film criticism, he says "looking back, there was a decisive moment or period that kind of maybe, although I didn't know it at the time, set me on the path toward film criticism. It was probably – when I was 15 years old, my mother had a work obligation that took her to Paris for a few months... And she took me with her. And it was just the two of us in a little apartment. And she was working all day, and I didn't know anybody, and was just sort of a lonely teenager. And so I went and took French classes in the morning. And then in the afternoon, I just sort of had the freedom of the city, which was great. And one of the things that I found myself doing was gravitating toward these little independent movie theaters that are kind of scattered across the Left Bank. They showed a lot of old American movies. And so I went a few times a week, whenever I was bored, which was a lot, and just sort of wandering in off the street."

== Career ==
=== Print ===
Scott began his career at The New York Review of Books, where he served as an assistant to Robert B. Silvers. Scott then served as book critic for Newsday, while also serving as a contributor to The New York Review of Books and Slate. In 1993, he wrote television reviews for Variety, using the name Tony Scott.

He joined The New York Times' Arts section in January 2000, following Janet Maslin's retirement from film criticism. (Maslin continues to review genre fiction for the paper.) In 2004, he became chief critic, following Elvis Mitchell's resignation. Scott and the other film critics at the Times host a video podcast on the subject of film, called Critics' Picks. On March 9, 2020, The New York Times announced that Scott would take a one-year break from his role as co-chief film critic and assume the title of critic at large, writing "bigger, cross-topic essays." Scott says he started at an exciting time for film: "I was really walking in at a high point in the film industry. Now 1999 is looked back on as one of the great years, up there with 1939 and 1962 and 1974 in the canon of magic years of cinema. And I think what had happened through the '90s was the flowering of, what's sometimes called, the indie boom of independent American filmmakers like Quentin Tarantino, Todd Haynes, Lisa Cholodenko, Julie Dash, Cheryl Dunye... I think by the end of the '90s, there was a sense that this formerly adventurous, often politically provocative and socially conscious filmmaking, was really maturing and was taking its place in the Hollywood mainstream." He cites David O. Russell's Three Kings and Paul Thomas Anderson's Magnolia as exciting films from 1999. He says that, at the Times, his mission was "to connect movies with their audiences. To let readers know what was out there, that might be the kind of movie they didn't think they were interested in. Because for me, moviegoing had always been about taking chances." He admits that "making the case for Freddy Got Fingered to readers of the New York Times was a bit of a challenge."

Scott published Better Living Through Criticism in 2016. On June 9, 2017, Scott and Dargis made a list of the best films of the twenty first century so far.

Scott left his role as a film critic in March 2023 and joined The New York Times Book Review. About his departure from film criticism, he said: "I have found that the way that I've practiced it has gotten harder to do. And also, the feeling of disconnection between the critic and the audience feels much stronger And the gulf feels much wider."

Looking back on his career as a critic, Scott says:

Movies have been part of my dream life and my worldly education since my first traumatic encounter with the flying monkeys in The Wizard of Oz. I'm still in awe of their power (the movies, not the monkeys) – to conjure up intense emotions, to invent new worlds and to disclose unsuspected truths about the one we inhabit.

The thing I love most about the movies is their ability to obliterate reason and abolish taste. You know the jump scare is coming, but you jump anyway. You suspect you should be offended by the joke, but you laugh helplessly in spite of yourself. Why are you crying? You don't really know, but you can't argue with tears.

It's inevitable that movies sometimes abuse their power and mistreat the people who love them most. When my kids were little – they were my regular companions at Saturday-morning preview screenings – I often objected to the pandering cynicism of "family-friendly" films like The Lorax and Despicable Me. I also marveled at the artistry of Studio Ghibli and the sublime ingenuity of Pixar in its glory years.

Similarly, I was pleased with the first couple of Spider-Man pictures, impressed by Batman Begins and The Dark Knight (which my brilliant colleague and fellow chief critic Manohla Dargis reviewed) and admiring of the way George Lucas connected the mythic dots in Revenge of the Sith. But I'm not a fan of modern fandom. This isn't only because I've been swarmed on Twitter by angry devotees of Marvel and DC and (more recently) Top Gun: Maverick and Everything Everywhere All at Once. It's more that the behavior of these social media hordes represents an anti-democratic, anti-intellectual mind-set that is harmful to the cause of art and antithetical to the spirit of movies. Fan culture is rooted in conformity, obedience, group identity and mob behavior, and its rise mirrors and models the spread of intolerant, authoritarian, aggressive tendencies in our politics and our communal life.

I will always love being at the movies: the tense anticipation in a darkening theater, the rapt attention and gasping surprise as the story unfolds, and the tingly silence that follows the final shot, right before the cheers – and the arguments – start. I wouldn't miss any of the movies I've seen, even the bad ones.

=== Television ===
In 2006 and 2007, Scott served as a guest critic on Ebert & Roeper during Roger Ebert's absence due to thyroid cancer.

Between 2002 and 2014, Scott made 15 appearances on Charlie Rose, where he predicted the Academy Award winners and spoke about recently released films. He often appeared alongside David Denby of The New Yorker and Janet Maslin of The New York Times and guest-hosted the program on a number of occasions.

On August 5, 2009, it was announced that Scott, along with Chicago Tribune critic Michael Phillips, would take over hosting duties on At the Movies from Ben Lyons and Ben Mankiewicz, who would no longer be involved with the show. Scott and Phillips began their duties when the show started its new season on September 5, 2009. The show was canceled after one season due to low ratings, concluding its run in August 2010.

=== Academia ===
Scott was a professor of film criticism at Wesleyan University. As of 2023, he is no longer listed as being on the faculty at Wesleyan.

== Preferences ==
=== Favorites ===
In a 2009 conversation with Rotten Tomatoes, Scott named his five favorite films as La Dolce Vita, The Godfather, Sullivan's Travels, McCabe & Mrs. Miller and The Man Who Shot Liberty Valance.

=== Best of the year ===
From 2000 to 2022, Scott compiled an annual film list which provides an overview of his critical preferences.

- 2000 – Yi Yi
- 2001 – A.I. Artificial Intelligence
- 2002 – Talk to Her
- 2003 – Master and Commander: The Far Side of the World
- 2004 – Million Dollar Baby
- 2005 – The Best of Youth
- 2006 – Letters from Iwo Jima
- 2007 – 4 Months, 3 Weeks and 2 Days
- 2008 – Wall-E
- 2009 – Where the Wild Things Are
- 2010 – Inside Job
- 2011 – Bridesmaids
- 2012 – Amour
- 2013 – Inside Llewyn Davis
- 2014 – Boyhood
- 2015 – Timbuktu
- 2016 – Moonlight
- 2017 – The Florida Project
- 2018 – Monrovia, Indiana
- 2019 – Honeyland
- 2020 – Borat Subsequent Moviefilm
- 2021 – Summer of Soul (...Or, When the Revolution Could Not Be Televised)
- 2022 – Nope

== Personal life ==
Scott is married to Justine Henning, and they have two children.

He was a finalist for the 2010 Pulitzer Prize for Criticism "for his incisive film reviews that, with aplomb, embrace a wide spectrum of movies and often explore their connection to larger issues in society or the arts".

A.O. Scott is Jewish.

== Filmography ==
Year	Title	Role	Notes
2001	Tales of the City: Hanif Kureshi's Rough Guide to London	Himself	
2002–2014	Charlie Rose	Guest/Guest Host	15 episodes
2006–2010	At the Movies	Guest Host/Co-Host	66 episodes
2008	American Masters	Himself	Episode: "You Must Remember This: The Warner Bros. Story"
2009	For the Love of Movies: The Story of American Film Criticism	Himself	
2010	Who Wants to Be a Millionaire	Guest Expert	5 episodes
2010	The View	Himself	1 episode
2010	TCM Guest Programmer	Himself	Episode: "U.S. Critics"
2010	Up To The Minute	Guest Film Critic	1 episode
2011	The Early Show	Himself	1 episode
2013–2016	Jeopardy!	Video Clue Presenter	5 episodes
2014	Life Itself	Himself	
2014	CBS This Morning	Himself	3 episodes
2015	Remembering David Carr	Himself	
2016	PBS NewsHour	Himself	1 episode
2016	Generation X	Himself	2 episodes
2017	Spielberg	Himself	
2021	WTF with Marc Maron	Himself	Episode: "A.O. Scott"

== See also ==
- New Yorkers in journalism

Media offices
Preceded by Elvis Mitchell	Chief film critic of The New York Times (with Manohla Dargis); 2000–2023	Succeeded by Manohla Dargis
