= Ken Baker (entertainment journalist) =

American entertainment journalist and author

- Occupation: Journalist
- Employer: NBCUniversal
- Notable work: E! News
Ice hockey career
- Height: 5 ft 11 in (180 cm)
- Weight: 170 lb (77 kg; 12 st 2 lb)
- Position: Goaltender
- Caught: Right
- Played for: Bakersfield Condors (WCHL); Quad City Mallards (UHL)
- NHL draft: Undrafted
- Playing career: 2001–2002

Kenneth Joel Baker is an American entertainment journalist and author who is the senior correspondent for E! News as well as the host of E! Online's daily web show Live From E!.

== Education and career ==
He began his journalism career as a news assistant for ABC News in the Washington bureau. He later worked as a reporter at the Daily Press in Newport News, Virginia.

In 1996, Baker became a Los Angeles-based correspondent for People magazine. In 1999, he became the magazine's Northwest correspondent, based in Northern California. Baker later was named West Coast Bureau Chief for Us Weekly as well as the West Coast executive editor and editorial director of Usmagazine.com. He went on to become senior correspondent for E! News as well as the host of E! Online's daily web show Live From E!.

Baker appears on Fox News Channel, The Today Show, CNN, MSNBC and HLN. In October 2017, Baker was pulled from the air by E! News while they investigated claims of sexual harassment.

== Author ==
Baker has written numerous books. In 2001, Baker published Man Made: A Memoir of My Body which tells the story of his battle with a prolactinoma. The 2016 film The Late Bloomer is an adaptation of this memoir.

Baker's second memoir, They Don't Play Hockey in Heaven: A Dream, a Team and My Comeback Season chronicled the season he spent as pro hockey's oldest rookie, published in 2003. Published in 2005, Hollywood Hussein is a satirical take on the capture of Saddam Hussein.

Baker also co-authored The Great Eight: How to Be Happy (even when you have every reason to be miserable) in 2009. In 2012, Baker published his first young adult novel, Fangirl, which tells the story of a fictional pop star who falls in love with a fan. In 2014, he published the novel How I Got Skinny, Famous and Fell Madly in Love.

Also in 2014, Baker contracted with Perseus Books Group's Running Press to write a series of novels called Deadline Diaries. The series of thrillers will tell the story of a teenage celebrity blogger working to uncover Hollywood mysteries. The first of the series, Finding Forever, was published in September 2015.

== Philanthropy ==
Baker is a speaker at schools and community/charity events. He has hosted the LAPD Hollenbeck PAL Awards Gala. Baker is a former member of the advisory board of the NHL's Los Angeles Kings.

== Sports ==
Baker played hockey at Colgate University from 1988 to 1992 and played on its ECAC Championship Team in 1990.

Baker also played professional hockey for the Bakersfield Condors and the Quad City Mallards after 10 years of not playing. He wrote a book about his experience, They Don't Play Hockey in Heaven (ISBN 1592286054).

Baker previously worked as a columnist for NHL.com, and coaches youth hockey.
