= Better Living Through Criticism =

2016 book by A. O. Scott

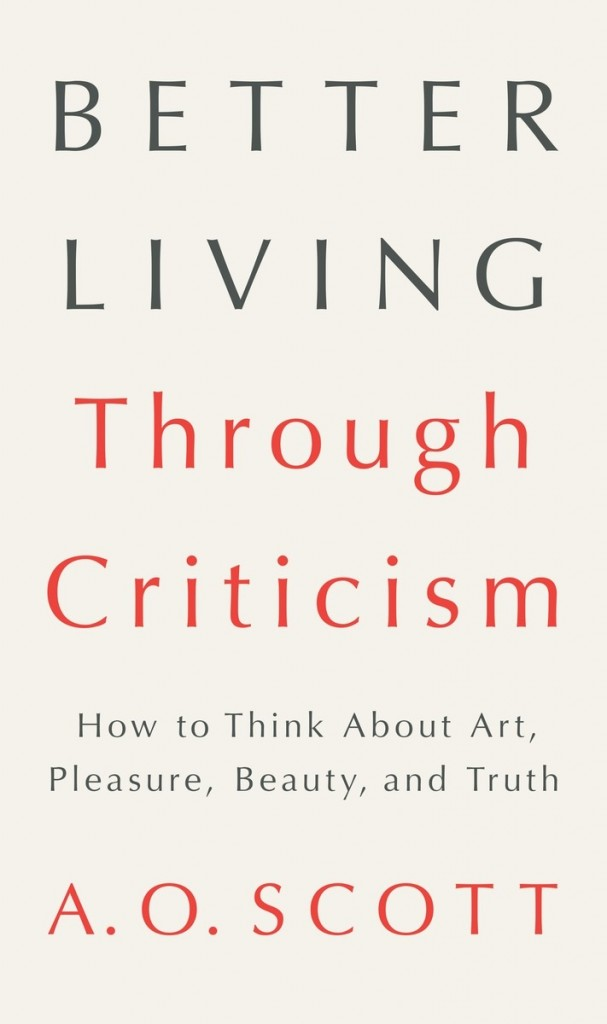
- Author: A. O. Scott
- Published: February 9, 2016 (Penguin Press)
- Pages: 288
- ISBN: 978-1-59420-483-8 (Hardcover)
- OCLC: 952546934

Better Living Through Criticism is a book by A. O. Scott about the role of critics in life.
