= Kara Hultgreen =

US Navy aviator (1965–1994)

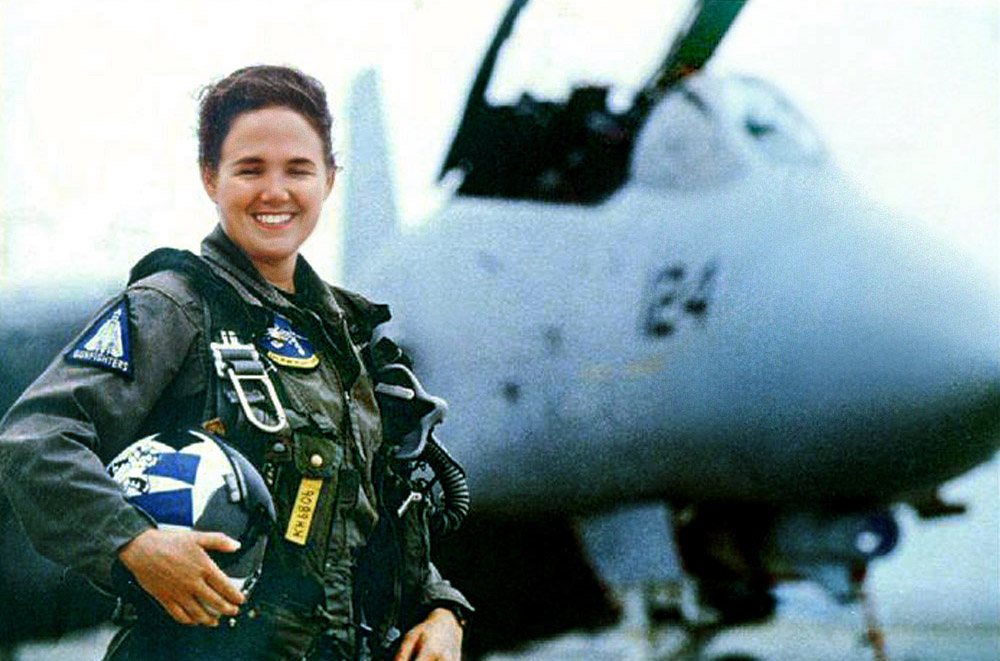
- Hultgreen with an F-14 Tomcat
- Born: October 5, 1965; Greenwich, Connecticut, US
- Died: October 25, 1994 (aged 29) off San Diego, California, US
- Burial place: Arlington National Cemetery
- Military career
- Branch: United States Navy
- Service years: 1987–1994
- Rank: Lieutenant
- Nickname: Revlon

Kara Spears Hultgreen (October 5, 1965 – October 25, 1994) was an American naval aviator who served as a lieutenant in the United States Navy and was the first female carrier-based fighter pilot in the U.S. Navy. She was also the first female fighter pilot in the U.S. military to die in a crash. She died just months after she was certified for combat, when the F-14 Tomcat she was piloting crashed into the sea on final approach to the USS Abraham Lincoln.

== Early life ==
Hultgreen was born on October 5, 1965, in Greenwich, Connecticut, the granddaughter of Norwegian immigrants on her father's side. She was raised in both Chicago and Toronto, then San Antonio from 1981 on. She attended Alamo Heights High School and received a congressional nomination to the United States Naval Academy, but did not get an appointment. She graduated in 1987 from the University of Texas at Austin, where she majored in aerospace engineering.

== Military career ==
Hultgreen was commissioned through the Aviation Officer Candidate School at Naval Air Station Pensacola, where she was a Distinguished Naval Graduate.

Upon graduation she was assigned to Training Air Wing 4 at Naval Air Station Corpus Christi, Texas, for primary flight training with VT-27 in the T-34C Turbomentor. Screened for the Strike Pilot training pipeline, she underwent follow-on training in the T-2C Buckeye and TA-4J Skyhawk II with Training Air Wing 3 at NAS Chase Field, Texas.

Following designation as a naval aviator, she received orders to fly EA-6A Prowlers with Tactical Electronic Warfare Squadron 33 (VAQ-33) at NAS Key West, Florida. Upon the Navy's integration of women in combat, Lt. Hultgreen was selected in May 1993 to be among the first female pilots to undergo F-14 Tomcat training at NAS Miramar, California.

While with Pacific Fleet F-14 Fleet Replacement Squadron, Fighter Squadron 124 (VF-124), Hultgreen failed her first attempt at carrier qualification, but she successfully carrier-qualified at the end of July 1994, becoming the first combat qualified female naval aviator. Upon completion of the VF-124 Category I fleet replacement pilot syllabus, she was assigned to the Black Lions of Fighter Squadron 213 (VF-213) and began preparations for deployment to the Persian Gulf.

Her call signs were "Hulk" or "She-Hulk", for her ability to bench press 200 pounds (91 kg), her 5 ft 10 in (1.78 m) frame, and a play on her surname. Following a television appearance in which she wore noticeable makeup, she received the additional call sign of "Revlon".

== Death ==
Video of F-14A-95-GR's crash

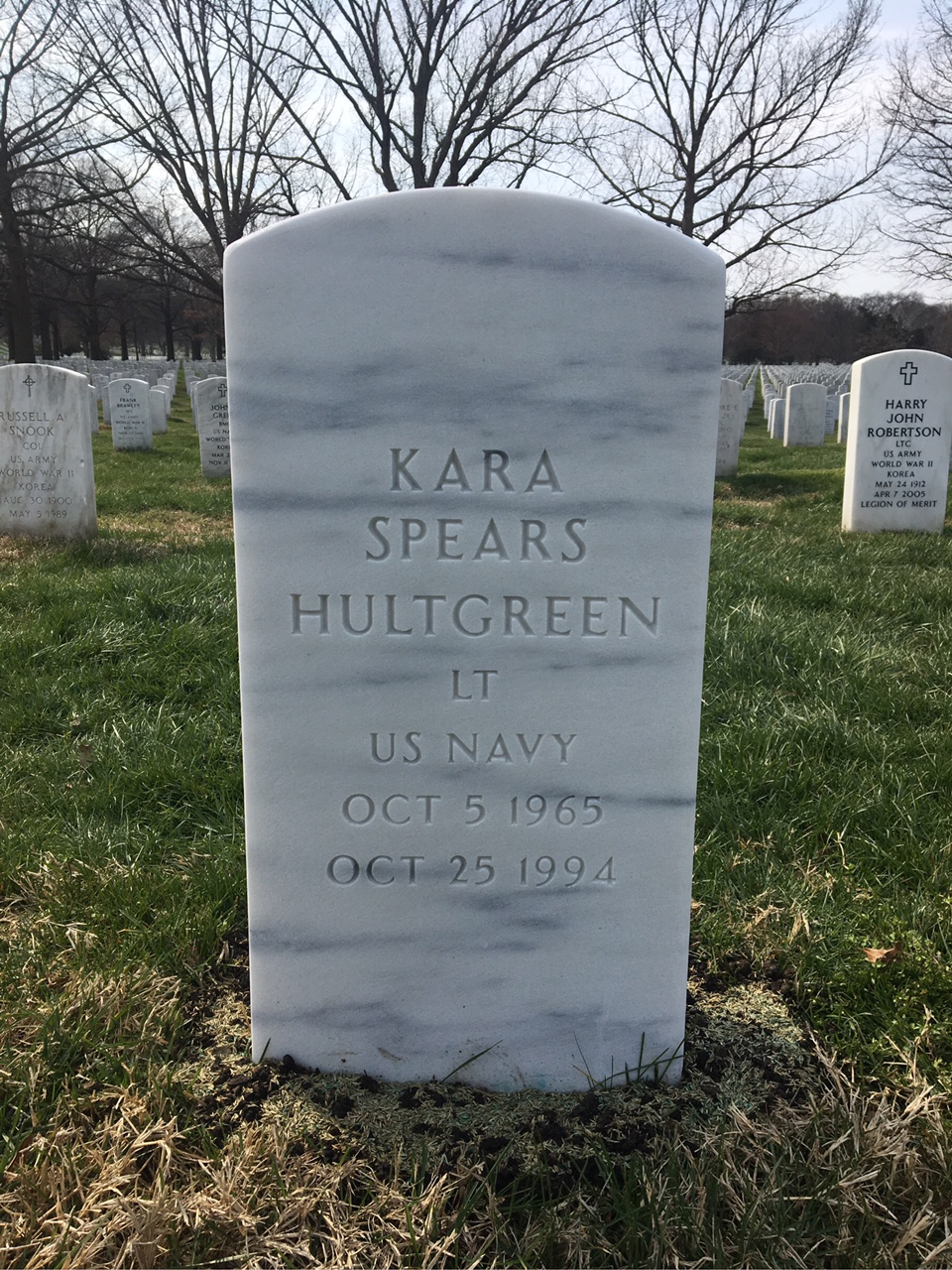
Grave at Arlington National Cemetery

On October 25, 1994, Hultgreen died when her F-14A-95-GR, BuNo 160390, coded "NH 103," crashed on approach to USS Abraham Lincoln. Hultgreen was the first female fighter pilot in the U.S. military to die in a crash. The incident occurred off the coast of San Diego after a routine training mission. Finding herself overshooting the landing area centerline, Hultgreen attempted to correct her approach by applying left rudder pedal, which caused the nose to disrupt the airflow over the left (inside) wing, as well as the airflow to the port engine intake.

The port engine suffered a compressor stall and lost power—a well-known deficiency characteristic of the F-14A's TF30-P-414A engine when inlet air is no longer flowing straight into it. For this reason, the F-14 NATOPS flight manual warned against excess yaw. Loss of an F-14 engine results in asymmetric thrust, which can exceed rudder authority (the degree of control exerted over the aircraft), especially at low speeds.

After aborting the approach, Hultgreen selected full afterburner on the remaining engine, causing an even greater asymmetry. This, combined with a high angle of attack, caused an unrecoverable approach turn stall and rapid wing drop to the left. The radar intercept officer in the rear seat, Lt. Matthew Klemish, initiated ejection for himself and Hultgreen as soon as it was apparent the aircraft was becoming uncontrollable. First in the automated ejection sequence, Klemish survived. However, by the time Hultgreen's seat fired 0.4 seconds later, the plane had exceeded 90 degrees of roll, and she was ejected downward into the water, killing her instantly.

On November 12, 19 days after the crash, the Navy salvaged the plane and recovered Hultgreen's body, still strapped into the ejection seat, from a depth of 3,700 feet (1,100 m). On November 21, she was buried at Arlington National Cemetery, with full military honors.

The F-14A lost in the crash, BuNo 160390, was one of the two aircraft involved in the Gulf of Sidra incident of 1981, when it was previously assigned to Fighter Squadron 41 (VF-41) at NAS Oceana, Virginia, and embarked with Carrier Air Wing Eight (CVW-8) aboard USS Nimitz.

As with most approaches to a carrier landing, Hultgreen's incident was videotaped by two cameras. The tape shows an overshooting turn onto final, then apparent engine failure, followed by an audible wave-off and gear-up command from the landing signal officer. Segments shown on broadcast television concluded with the rapid sequence of aircraft stall, roll, crew ejections, and impact with the water.

== Accusations of unqualification ==
Hultgreen's death has been used by critics who oppose women flying combat aircraft, and who believe the Navy has put political considerations ahead of safety and morale.

In the aftermath of the crash, Navy experts defended Hultgreen and released the result of an internal investigation which stated that Hultgreen's plane crashed because of mechanical failure, not pilot error.

== See also ==
- Modern United States Navy carrier air operations
- Dagny Hultgreen (sister)
