= Superfan (American game show) =

American reality competition show

- Genre: Game show
- Created by: Keltie Knight; Jodi Roth
- Presented by: Keltie Knight; Nate Burleson
- Country of origin: United States
- Original language: English
- No. of seasons: 1
- No. of episodes: 6

Production
- Executive producers: Jodi Roth; Keltie Knight; Jack Martin
- Production companies: Yacht Money; Raquel Productions

Original release
- Network: CBS
- Release: August 9 – September 20, 2023

Superfan is an American game show that premiered on CBS on August 9, 2023. The series is hosted by Keltie Knight and Nate Burleson.

== Format ==
Each episode features a popular musician as a guest, and a field of contestants who consider themselves to be "superfans" of that musician. The contestants compete in various challenges related to the musician, including identifying their songs, and answering trivia questions relating to their career and personal life. The final two contestants compete in a lip sync performance to one of the musician's songs to determine the winner.

== Production ==
On February 22, 2022, it was announced that CBS had ordered the series. On April 19, 2022, the superstars and hosts were announced. On May 22, 2023, originally scheduled for June 9, 2023, it was announced that the series would premiere on August 9, 2023.

== Episodes ==
No.	Title	Original release date	Prod. code	U.S. viewers (millions)	Rating (18-49)
1	"LL Cool J"	August 9, 2023	105	1.40	0.2
2	"Shania Twain"	August 16, 2023	103	1.33	0.2
3	"Gloria Estefan"	August 23, 2023	102	1.20	0.1
4	"Little Big Town"	August 30, 2023	104	1.40	0.2
5	"Pitbull"	September 6, 2023	101	1.14	0.2
6	"Kelsea Ballerini"	September 20, 2023	106	1.23	0.2
