= Jeffrey Lyons =

American television and film critic (born 1944)

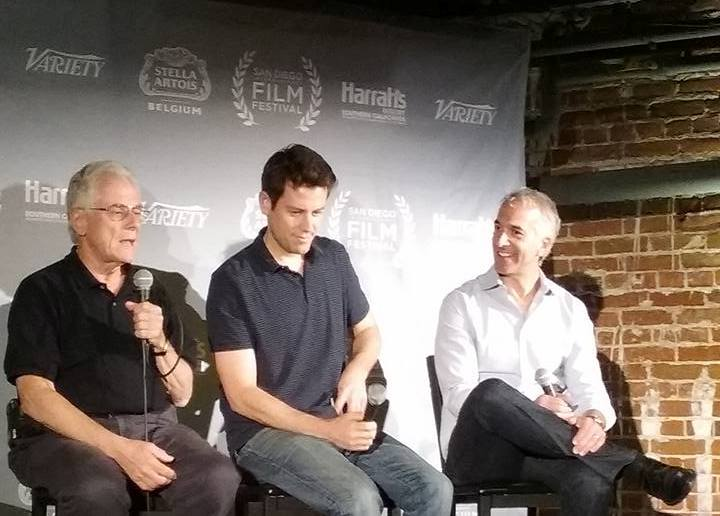
- Lyons (left), with son Ben Lyons and film critic Scott Mantz at the 2016 San Diego International Film Festival
- Born: November 5, 1944 (age 82); Manhattan, New York City, United States
- Occupations: Author, Journalist, Film historian, Film critic,
- Spouse: Judy Lyons (m. 1973)
- Children: 2, including Ben Lyons
- Writing career
- Subject: Film

Jeffrey Lyons (born November 5, 1944) is an American television and film critic based in the New York metropolitan area.

== Early life ==
Lyons was born in Manhattan, one of the four sons of Sylvia R. (Schoenberger) and Leonard Lyons, a newspaper columnist. His godfather was the playwright Sidney Kingsley and his godmother was the actress Madge Evans. Lyons grew up in a kosher household on Manhattan's Upper West Side, in the prestigious Beresford apartment building. As a teenager, he trained as a field goal kicker with the New York Giants for three seasons (1961–63) and studied bullfighting for seven summers in Spain with Antonio Ordonez, characterized by Ernest Hemingway (a mutual friend) as "the greatest matador of them all" in The Dangerous Summer.

He received a bachelor's degree in journalism from the University of Pennsylvania before earning a J.D. from the Syracuse University School of Law in 1969. During this period, he studied acting with Lee Strasberg at the Lee Strasberg Theater Institute. He later received two honorary degrees, from Hofstra University in 2000 and St. Mary's college in 2002.

== Career ==
Lyons began his professional career working on the city desk of The Jersey Journal, writing sports and obituaries. After publishing a story as an intern on the Metropolitan desk of The New York Times, he covered the two national political conventions of 1968 for WINS.

From 1970 to 1991, Lyons was the film critic for WPIX. Following the departure of Roger Ebert and Gene Siskel, he co-hosted the PBS movie review show Sneak Previews from 1982 to 1996. He also appeared on MSNBC's At the Movies from 2004 to 2006 with his son, fellow critic and television personality Ben Lyons. On American AM radio, he hosted a show, "The Lyons Den," on WCBS (AM) from 1975 to 1993; the title is taken from the New York Post column that his father wrote for 40 years. He joined WNBC in 1996 as the station's film and theatre critic. His last report on WNBC was on June 26, 2009. He reported during Live at Five and NewsChannel 4 newscasts. Lyons created and co-hosted the NBC syndicated movie review TV show Lyons & Bailes Reel Talk from 2005-09. He currently hosts a syndicated radio program called "LYONS DEN RADIO" and appears on several national TV shows talking movies. In addition to his work as a critic, he has appeared as himself in Deathtrap, and the TV series Wiseguy.

Lyons is the author or co-author of eight books, including Jeffrey Lyons' 101 Great Movies for Kids. He and his brother Douglas have written several baseball trivia books, Out of Left Field, Curveballs and Screwballs, and Short Hops and Foul Tips. In addition, he has two other books published, Stories My Father Told Me: Notes From 'The Lyons Den', about his father's iconic Broadway column, and Catching Heat, co-authored with his brother Douglas and former Yankee Jim Leyritz, whose biography it is. Jeffrey and Douglas Lyons have lectured at the Smithsonian Institution and at the National Baseball Hall of Fame and Museum in Cooperstown, New York. Lyons has been a guest announcer, both as play-by-play and analyst, for the Boston Red Sox radio network and Red Sox games in Spanish.

In January 2012, he returned to WCBS radio and national syndication with another iteration of "LYONS DEN RADIO", reviewing five movies a week. In April 2013, he hosted "The Lineup: Best Sports Movies" on Madison Square Garden TV, choosing the five best movies in eight sports over eight programs on a panel with Spike Lee, actors Robert Wuhl and Chazz Palminteri, hosted by former Yankee Fran Healy. In March 2014, he hosted another series of shows on the best movies about New York entitled The Lineup: Best New York Movies again with Spike Lee, and actors John Leguziamo and Ed Burns, followed by another series of shows about boxing entitled The Lineup: Boxing's Greatest in 2016.

In February 2014, he signed a contract with Abbeville Press to write a sequel to "Stories My Father Told Me, Notes From The Lyons Den," called "What A Time It Was! More Notes From The Lyons Den," also about his father's era as a New York Broadway columnist. The book was published in September 2015. In May 2021, Lyons published a book on Ernest Hemingway entitled Hemingway and Me: Letters, Anecdotes, and Memories of a Life-Changing Friendship.

Since 2015, Lyons has hosted, co-hosted or keynoted international film festivals in San Diego; Sedona, Arizona; Vero Beach, Florida; Aiken, South Carolina and The Bahamas.

== Preferences ==
=== Views ===
In a 2023 interview, Lyons described the streaming services like Netflix and Amazon Prime Video as existential threats to movie theaters, compelling cinemas to rely on immersive technologies such as 3D to compete with home viewing habits.

== Personal life ==
Jeffrey is married to his wife, Judy, since 1973. He has two children, television personality Ben Lyons and natural-foods chef Hannah Lyons. His niece, Margaret Lyons, is a television critic for The New York Times.

== Filmography ==
Year	Title	Role	Notes
1981	Applevision	Himself	
1982-1996	Sneak Previews	Host	
1982	Deathtrap	Himself	
1990	Wiseguy	Himself	Episode: "Hello Buckwheat"
1993	In Living Color	Himself	Episode: "Duke and Cornbread Turner"
1994	Humphrey Bogart: Behind the Legend	Himself	
1995	Late Night with Conan O'Brien	Guest	Episode: "Will Smith/Jeffrey Lyons/Robert Schimmel"
1995	The Feminine Touch	Himself	
1997	Sports on the Silver Screen	Himself	Uncredited
2001	Headliners & Legends with Matt Lauer	Himself	Episode: "Halle Berry"
2001	ESPN SportsCentury	Himself	Episode: "Brian Piccolo"
2001	Arliss	Himself	Episode: "Like No Business I Know"
2003	The Curse of the Bambino	Himself	
2005-2009	Reel Talk	Himself	
2009	Yankeeography	Himself	Episode: "George Steinbrenner"
2010	Halloween: The Inside Story	Himself	
2010	The Wendy Williams Show	Himself	1 episode
2010	Biography	Film Critic/Television Critic	2 episodes
2012	Today	Himself	1 episode
2013	Rethink 50+ Town Hall	Panelist	
2013	The Lineup: Best Sports Movies	Panelist	
2014	The Lineup: Best New York Movies	Himself	
2016	The Garden's Defining Moments	Himself	Episode: "Marilyn Monroe Sings Happy Birthday to JFK"
2016	Theater Talk	Critic	Episode: "James Shapiro and Jeffrey Lyons"
2016	The Lineup: Boxing's Greatest	Panelist	Episode: "Best Puncher of All Time"
2018	The History of Everything Circa 1993: F/K/A A Kissy Cousins Monster Babies	Himself	
2018	Kissy Cousins Monster Babies and Morphing Elvis	Himself	
2021	The Rich Eisen Show	Himself	Episode: "Jeffrey Lyons/Renee Montgomery"

== Awards and honors ==
In April 2014, Lyons won five New York Emmys for his work on The Lineup: Best Sports Movies in 2013.
