= The Insider (TV program) =

American television news magazine

- Also known as: omg! Insider (2013–2014)
- Genre: News magazine
- Presented by: Louis Aguirre; Debbie Matenopoulos
- Composers: Michael Egizi (2004–2017); Joel Beckerman (2013–2015); Eric Allaman (2013–2015); Dan Beyer (2007); Kevin Frazier
- Country of origin: United States
- Original language: English
- No. of seasons: 13
- No. of episodes: 4,074 (3,395 weekdays; 679 weekend)

Production
- Executive producers: Linda Bell Blue (2004–2013); Brad Bessey (2013–2016); Jeffrey Wilson (2016–2017)
- Camera setup: Multi-camera
- Running time: 21 minutes
- Production companies: Paramount Domestic Television (seasons 1–2); CBS Paramount Domestic Television (seasons 2–4); CBS Television Distribution (seasons 4–13)

Original release
- Network: Syndication; CBS
- Release: September 13, 2004 – September 9, 2017

Related
- Entertainment Tonight

The Insider is an American syndicated television news magazine that was distributed by CBS Television Distribution. The program aired in first-run syndication from September 13, 2004, to September 9, 2017, as a spin-off of Entertainment Tonight, which originated the concept as a segment that took viewers "behind closed doors" and gave them "inside" information on stories and topics of interest from throughout the entertainment industry.

When it became a separate program, it shifted toward a tabloid direction, and had several format changes throughout its thirteen seasons on the air before settling on a final format at the start of the 2011–12 season, which shed many of the tabloid elements and became more of a straight rundown of entertainment news, providing coverage of events and celebrities, interviews and inside looks at upcoming film and television projects.

The program's weekday broadcasts were anchored by Louis Aguirre and Debbie Matenopoulos; its weekend editions were anchored by Michael Yo and Keltie Knight, who also served as correspondents for the weekday editions.

== History ==
Starting out with a bi-coastal format, the program was originally hosted by Pat O'Brien – who was based in Hollywood at Paramount Studios Stage 28, where Entertainment Tonight's set was also housed at the time – and Lara Spencer – who was based at MTV's One Astor Plaza studio in New York City, overlooking Times Square. In its first season, The Insider originally maintained a news-heavy format, making way for a direction where subjects such as a pair of anorexic nervosa twin sisters from Australia (who died in an April 2012 house fire) were regularly featured in sweeps periods, along with other fringe stories such as true crime stories and the Nadya Suleman story, which had little or nothing to do with the entertainment industry.

O'Brien – who was originally co-host of syndication competitor Access Hollywood from 1997 to 2004 – remained co-host of The Insider until March 5, 2008, when he was replaced with Donny Osmond. O'Brien returned to the program one month later after Osmond declined to take on a role as a permanent host. During the first four years she was on the program, Spencer hosted the program solo at times due to O'Brien's varied personal problems, which forced him to take time off in extended periods to address them. The original theme song – which was changed after the second season, coincided with a change in distributors to CBS Paramount Domestic Television after CBS assumed ownership of Viacom's television production and syndication operations in their December 2005 split – was performed by Richie Sambora.

For its fourth season, production of the program was moved to New York City full-time in September 2007. O'Brien relocated from Los Angeles to join Spencer in a new studio based within the Minskoff Theatre in Manhattan (where the musical adaptation of The Lion King is based), which featured unobstructed views of Times Square, nearby the MTV studio facilities and also within One Astor Plaza.

On September 8, 2008, The Insider began broadcasting in high-definition television; concurrently, The Insider relocated primary production and studio operations back to Los Angeles, joining sister program ET at Stage 4 at the CBS Studio Center, one of the final steps involving the incorporation of Paramount's former syndication arm, Paramount Domestic Television, into CBS' distribution arms following the earlier CBS-Viacom split and the adoption of the then-new CBS Television Distribution name. The set's focal point was a large life-size 3D construction of the program's logo, which was formerly used as the main portion of the set where segments took place until the September 2009 retooling of the program to incorporate a panel format.

The New York-based aspect of the program was also abandoned, with Spencer relocating to Los Angeles and becoming a solo host, joined by correspondents Victoria Recano, Steven Cojocaru and Cheryl Woodcock. In the move, O'Brien became a Los Angeles-based correspondent for the program; however ten days later on September 18, he was dismissed permanently from The Insider for comments he made in a staff email after a trip to Iowa, where he directed comments specifically at a mid-show daily segment presented by Spencer that debuted at the start of the season. O'Brien proceeded to involve a rundown of the prices and labels of her clothing and accessories (which were referenced in the segment), saying that it made the viewers he talked to "vomit". Despite this pointed criticism, the segment continued to air at the end of every edition until Spencer's departure, expanding to the point where viewers made a multiple choice on what Spencer would wear on the next broadcast. O'Brien would appear one more time on the final episode of The Insider nine years later, congratulating the show's staff and crew for their work.

After the departure of O'Brien, the show was hosted by Spencer alone until January 2009, when Samantha Harris (who had previously served as a correspondent for E! News) joined the program as a permanent co-host. Harris also provided analysis and commentary as part of her duties as co-host of ABC's Dancing with the Stars until her departure from the reality competition series at the start of 2010.

=== Changes in format and hosts ===
During September 2009, the program converted to a panel format, featuring a roundtable discussion and debate format (similar to Pardon the Interruption or the "Hot Topics" segment of The View) with three permanent co-hosts and a guest host discussing entertainment topics, although that was also modified as actress Niecy Nash became a fourth de facto host and the program added a rotating fifth guest host slot. As a result, the on-air correspondents were effectively dismissed, with stories being compiled by Entertainment Tonight staff or off-camera personnel.

The format was changed once again in September 2010, restoring it to a more traditional entertainment newsmagazine concept with Spencer and Chris Jacobs as co-hosts. Industry analysts had surmised that the change was a precursor to testing Spencer in the traditional ET format without placing her on that show, as Entertainment Tonight's longtime primary anchor Mary Hart had announced her retirement from that program at the end of the 2010–2011 season; however, Nancy O'Dell would be appointed to succeed Hart as co-anchor at the end of May 2011.

On March 5, 2011, CBS Television Distribution announced that Kevin Frazier would become co-anchor of the program, replacing Jacobs, who moved to Entertainment Tonight as a correspondent for that program. Twelve days later on March 17, it was announced that Spencer would leave the program by the start of May to become the lifestyle anchor for Good Morning America. Spencer was replaced by Brooke Anderson, who had served as co-host of HLN's Showbiz Tonight. During the week of the Wedding of Prince William and Catherine Middleton, Anderson split her reporting duties between CNN and The Insider. At the start of its seventh season on September 4, 2011, the program was refocused more as a straight entertainment news show, with many of the tabloid elements of the Spencer/O'Brien era being removed; additionally, the program's website was refocused to be more of a straight competitor to TMZ.

=== Partnership with Yahoo! ===
On October 24, 2012, CBS Television Distribution reached a brand licensing and content agreement with Yahoo! to pool content between the latter's celebrity/gossip news division, omg!, and The Insider. Through this agreement, the program was retitled as omg! Insider on January 7, 2013. On January 1, 2014, executive producer Brad Bessey announced in a video on the program's Facebook account that the show would restore its original title on January 6, while retaining all other elements. The reinstatement of the show's original title resulted from Yahoo CEO Marissa Mayer's decision to rebrand of some of Yahoo's platforms, including "omg!", which changed its name to "Yahoo Celebrity"; however, both entities continue to share stories and content with one other. The Yahoo! partnership was discontinued on September 12, 2016.

In August 2014, Kevin Frazier departed The Insider to become co-anchor the weekday edition of Entertainment Tonight, on which he had previously served as a weekend anchor and correspondent from 2004 to 2011. He was replaced on September 8 of that year by Louis Aguirre, who joined the program after fifteen years as host of the similarly formatted Deco Drive on Fox affiliate WSVN in Miami.

On June 16, 2015, The Wrap reported that special correspondent Debbie Matenopoulos would replace Thea Andrews as co-host of The Insider; Matenopoulos replaced Andrews, who departed from the program, on July 6.

=== Cancellation ===
Because of declining ratings, CBS Television Distribution announced the cancellation of The Insider after 13 years on February 7, 2017. The final show aired on September 9.

== Syndication model ==
The Insider aired on television stations in certain markets throughout the United States as half of a one-hour entertainment news block that also included the show from which it was spun off, Entertainment Tonight.

Three versions of The Insider were previously compiled and made available to broadcasters before 2009; a "standalone" version (which largely omitted references to ET), and two other versions designed to precede or follow ET with promotions outlining stories to be featured on that day's edition of the latter show, in addition to those stories to air on the next Insider broadcast. After 2009, only a standalone version without ET continuity was produced, as carriage of the program outside of primary markets was reduced to lower-tier stations and lower profile timeslots (often in late-night television or on a same-day or day-behind basis in daytime television), making complementary coverage between the two shows impossible.

== On-air staff ==
=== Former on-air staff ===
- Louis Aguirre – co-anchor (2014–2017; now at WPLG in Miami)
- Brooke Anderson – anchor/correspondent (2011–2012; later at Entertainment Tonight, now at Inside Edition)
- Thea Andrews – co-anchor (2013–2015)
- Matte Babel – special correspondent (2012)
- Lisa Bloom – legal analyst (2010)
- Steven Cojocaru – style expert (2004–2009; later at Entertainment Tonight)
- Kevin Frazier – co-anchor (2011–2014; now host of Entertainment Tonight)
- Kathie Lee Gifford – correspondent (2005–2006; later at NBC News as co-host of Today)
- Samantha Harris – weekend anchor/correspondent (2009–2010; later at Entertainment Tonight, now back at Extra)
- Chris Jacobs – anchor/correspondent (2009–2011; later at Entertainment Tonight)
- Darren Kavinoky – legal analyst (2009–2017)
- Keltie Knight – correspondent (2012–2017; later at Entertainment Tonight, now co-host of E! News)
- Ananda Lewis – correspondent (2004–2005, deceased)
- Debbie Matenopoulos – special correspondent (2011–2012), co-anchor (2015–2017, later co-host of Home & Family on Hallmark Channel)
- Jill Martin – correspondent (2010–2011; later at Access Hollywood)
- Niecy Nash – celebrity panelist (2009–2010)
- Pat O'Brien – anchor/correspondent (2004–2008)
- Donny Osmond – correspondent (2007–2008; also hosted in place of O'Brien for a short time in 2008)
- Nina Parker – correspondent (2011–2014, later at E! News)
- Victoria Recano – weekend anchor/correspondent (2004–2009; later at KTLA in Los Angeles and TV Guide Network; now back at Inside Edition)
- Thomas Roberts – correspondent (2007–2008; later at NBC News, MSNBC, WGCL-TV in Atlanta and host of Daily Mail TV)
- Lara Spencer – anchor/correspondent (2004–2011; now at Good Morning America)
- Cheryl Woodcock – correspondent (2007–2009)
- Michael Yo – correspondent/fill-in co-anchor (2013–2017, now host of Scrambled Up)

== International carriage ==
Outside of the United States, The Insider aired on Big CBS Love in India, ETC in the Philippines, and MBC 4 in the Middle East and North Africa after Entertainment Tonight.

In Australia, Network Ten had aired The Insider a day behind the American broadcast alongside sister program Entertainment Tonight on weekday mornings, with a rebroadcast airing on sister network 10 Peach after midnight; Ten and Eleven removed the show from their schedules on November 1, 2013. The program also formerly aired on the Foxtel owned pay television channel Arena, and in Canada on Hamilton, Ontario based CHCH.

An Arabic adaptation titled THE INSIDER بالعربي began airing on Dubai TV at 12 November 2017.

== Arabic adaptation ==
An Arabic adaptation titled The Insider Bel Arabi – TheInsiderAR (Arabic version of The Insider (TV series) بالعربي The Insider), began airing on Dubai TV in November 2017.

== International versions ==
The international rights are distributed by CBS Studios International.

Country/language	Local title	Channel	Date aired/premiered
Arab World	The Insider Arabia (The Insider بالعربي – بالعربي The Insider – The Insider Bil Arabi – The Insider بالعربي TheInsiderAR The Insider Arabia – The Insider Arabia – The Insider بالعربي – Inside Take The Inside Take)	Abu Dhabi TV. Dubai TV.	November 12, 2017
