= Darren Kavinoky =

American criminal lawyer and television correspondent

- Born: November 21, 1966 (age 59); Vinita, Oklahoma
- Education: University of Oregon, San Diego State University, University of LaVerne
- Occupations: Attorney, correspondent for TV entertainment news
- Children: 1
- Website: darrenkavinoky.com

Darren Kavinoky is an American criminal lawyer and television journalist who is the creator of the television show Deadly Sins on Investigation Discovery. He is also the featured Criminal Interventionist on the Investigation Discovery TV series Breaking Point. Darren is an on-air legal analyst and a special correspondent for the syndicated show The Insider, where he reports on legal, political, and pop-culture issues. Kavinoky has also appeared on The Insider’s sister show, Entertainment Tonight, as well as NBC’s Today Show, Dr. Phil, various shows on CNN Headline News, and many other national and local television and radio programs. Kavinoky also frequently contributes a video blog to The Insider.

== Television ==
Kavinoky is the co-creator and host of Deadly Sins, which airs at 9 p.m. each Saturday night (and repeated throughout the week) on Investigation Discovery in the United States. The show uses the seven deadly sins as an analytical framework for understanding extreme forms of criminal misbehavior.

== Legal ==
Kavinoky has authored three legal books, including Facing a DUI Charge in California: What You Need to Know.

== Awards ==
Kavinoky was named a Thomson Reuters Super Lawyer Rising Star in 2005 and 2006, and was named a Super Lawyer in 2010, 2011, 2012, and 2013. He has been named one of the Top 100 Trial Lawyers in California by the National Trial Lawyers every year since 2007, and has received an "AV" Rating (highest level of skill and ethical standards) by the Martindale-Hubbell directory. Kavinoky was recently named one of the University of La Verne's 125 Notable Leos for Life in honor of the school's 125th anniversary.

== Education ==
- Ashland Sr. High School, Ashland, Oregon (1984)
- San Diego State University
- University of LaVerne, San Fernando Valley College of Law

== Personal life ==
Kavinoky is married and has one daughter. He is an endurance athlete, having completed seven Ironman Triathlons, several marathons, and one ultramarathon.
