= My Family's Got Guts =

- Presented by: Ben Lyons; Asha Kuerten
- Country of origin: United States
- Original language: English
- No. of seasons: 2
- No. of episodes: 22

Production
- Production location: Universal Studios Florida
- Camera setup: Multi-camera setup
- Running time: 30 minutes
- Production companies: Worldwide Biggies; Five Alts Productions, LLC. Nickelodeon Productions

Original release
- Network: Nickelodeon
- Release: September 15 – September 27, 2008

Related
- Guts

My Family's Got Guts is a family game show that aired on Nickelodeon. It was a revival of Guts, and aired from September 15 to September 27, 2008. The show was taped in Sound Stages 23 and 24 at Universal Studios Florida, housing the Extreme Arena and the Aggro Crag, respectively. Stage 21, where the original Guts program taped, was most recently occupied by production of Impact Wrestling. This version is hosted by Ben Lyons and officiated by Australian celebrity Asha Kuerten. It was the first (and only) Nickelodeon production to be produced at Universal Studios Florida since the closing of Nickelodeon Studios in 2005. For unknown reasons, season 2 never aired in North America. However, the season would air in its entirety in other countries.

== Gameplay ==
The show is unlike the original Guts as it follows a tournament-style structure of twelve teams being narrowed down to six during six preliminary episodes, and then three in three semifinal episodes, with the final teams competing in an hour-long "Aggro Bowl". The preliminaries consist of two events and then the Aggro Crag. Points also do not determine the winner. Each point a team is ahead of the other is worth a tenth-second head start (10 Points equal 1 second, maximum: 7 in the preliminaries, and 10 in the semi-finals and the Aggro Bowl for Season 1) in the Aggro Crag. In the semi-finals, there are three events before the Aggro Crag that are more difficult than the previous round. The Aggro Crag is also more elaborate and challenging and the maximum head start is 10 seconds.

== Events ==
=== Preliminary events ===
- Free Run City - Teammates must have a relay and get through many obstacles to get to the finish, beating the other team. The time limit is two minutes for each team. Each second a team has left under two minutes is worth a point.
- Sky Slam - Two teammates from two different teams compete in a basketball challenge where they are connected to elastic wires. Before slam dunking baskets, the teammate holding the ball can call a defense from the other teammate to help block the opposition for a slam dunk. Each dunk is worth 10 points, whoever has the most at the end of 90 seconds wins.
- Flying Football - This challenge is related to the Sky Slam event, but this is where the competitors must play in football style. Each catch is worth 10 points, whoever has the most at the end of 90 seconds wins.
- Supertoe PK - The competitors must kick soccer balls into the goal in order to score points. Each goal is worth 10 points whoever has the most at the end of 90 seconds wins.
- Vert Ball - In a related vein of dodgeball, the teams must get the opposing team's members out. In order to win the event, they must avoid the other teams's offense hurling for 90 seconds. Each hit is worth 10 points.

=== Semifinal events ===
- Air Slalom - One player from each team is strapped onto a snowboard, one standing on the "launchpad", and the two remaining players are attached to ropes that connect to the snowboard and help steer. The team must steer the snowboard around as many flags as possible. Each gate cleared is worth 10 points.
- Formula Guts - A two-player relay around the track in a "pod-bike". Each driver runs one lap, and must switch over during a pit-stop halfway during the race. The winning team receives 100 points, while the losing team receives 75 points.
- Volley Brawl - Two volleyball courts are set up with two players on each of the four sides. One stands on the floor and serves a volleyball, while the other jumps off the Aerial Bridge and attempts to hit it over the net. Each time a player fails to hit the ball, the opposition scores 10 points, whoever has the most at the end of 90 seconds wins.

=== Aggro Bowl events ===
- Guts Grand Prix - A two-player race in which one player rides a "High-Stepper" (a bike with no seat) and the other rides a "Low Rider" (a vehicle similar to the one used in Wild Wheels of the original Guts). The first teammate must cross their finish line before the second may begin; first place is worth 100 points, second place is worth 75 points, third place is worth 50 points. This event took place outdoors, at Universal Studios Florida's New York Street area.
- Mile High Triple Jump - Only one contestant participates for each team. Each contestant must clear a high jump bar and two "hurdles" by jumping off the ground with help of elastic cord. Finally, the contestant must then take a sticky marker, jump off a platform, and attempt to paste it on a vertical wall. Each bar, hurdle, and vertical foot on the leap cleared is worth 10 points.
- Free Run City: Wild Side - A re-designed Free Run City from the preliminary episodes with some modifications including pipes, poles, and ladders added to the Water Tower, missing cat-swings from the SkyBridge, and an all-new obstacle "Drop Zone", in which players must slide down a zipline in a harness and try to drop down onto a giant manhole.
- Alley Hoop - One player needs to toss basketballs from the ground up to their partners jumping off platforms, who must catch them and throw them into a central hoop. Each basket is worth 10 points, whoever has the most at the end of 90 seconds wins.

=== The Aggro Crag ===
This takes place when the families must climb a 22-foot-tall (6.7 m) mountain to taste "My Family's Got Guts" victory and win the competition.

Preliminary episodes required two players to climb the Crag - one team had to climb up their respective side of the mountain through the "Ice-Surfin' Switchbacks", a set of wobbly wedges that players needed to maneuver around, climb over the "Skeleton Stalagmites", and activate three actuators including one at the end of this first leg, "Avalanche Peak" with a "frozen lava storm" raining down on contestants. This in turns opened the Ice Portal at the base of the Crag, where the second player awaited. Players then had to cross some stepping stones across "The Glacial Gorge" and climb two vertical rock climbing walls dubbed "The Vertical Freeze", to reach the Crystal Peak and hit their final actuator to finalize the results.

Semifinal episodes then required all four players to climb the Crag. A new section was added, "The Mad Mesas", which was a path of boulders that the contestant needed to run over to reach the second player at the base of the Switchbacks. Their final actuator would open up a trapdoor in Avalanche Peak that lead them to a spiraling "Swirling Vortex" slide that lead them behind the main facade of the Crag and to the third player, who had to navigate the "Crag Caverns". Once they had maneuvered this maze, they needed to traverse the entire Glacial Gorge around the entire mountain and reach the base of the mountain, which would finally open the Ice Portal and allow the fourth player to climb the Vertical Freeze to victory.

In Aggro Bowls, a control panel had been placed at the start of the Crag Caverns, where the third player from each team could control additional snow and hail that could challenge their respective opponents climbing the Mesas and Switchbacks. Once the second player made the exchange with the third, he or she could take over control and release "Arctic Steam" in the Crag Caverns and drop an avalanche on the fourth players climbing the Vertical Freeze.

For each victory, teams received a white "piece of the Aggro Crag". The champions of the tournament received all three, including a considerably larger third piece, which could be put together to form a miniature Aggro Crag as a trophy, along with the grand prize of a trip on the Nickelodeon Family Cruise.

== Tourney tree ==
=== Season One ===
==== Preliminaries ====
- Sherry Storm vs. Chastain Charge
- Cyclone Jones vs. Hurricane Hutagalungs
- Rojo Grande vs. Eichen-Splat
- Lowe Riders vs. Howlin' Howells
- Dionne Dash vs. Gahres G-Dogs
- Kickin' Johnsons vs. Richards Riptide

==== Semifinals ====
- Chastain Charge vs. Cyclone Jones
- Eichen-Splat vs. Howlin' Howells
- Gahres G-Dogs vs. Kickin' Johnsons

==== Finals (Aggro Bowl) ====
- Cyclone Jones vs. Howlin' Howells vs. Gahres G-Dogs

=== Season Two ===
==== Preliminaries ====
- Ballentine Bruisers vs. Burns Body Slam
- Webb Dynamite vs. Power House
- A-Game Andersons vs. Smith Party of Six
- Burnham Killer B's vs. Green Machine
- Jones Attack vs. McLean Dream Team
- Wailin' Laylands vs. Phillips' Phury

==== Semifinals ====
- Ballentine Bruisers vs. Webb Dynamite
- A-Game Andersons vs. Green Machine
- McLean Dream Team vs. Wailin' Laylands

==== Finals (Aggro Bowl) ====
- Webb Dynamite vs. Green Machine vs. McLean Dream Team
