= Dance Machine =

- Genre: Interactive game show
- Created by: Greg Goldman
- Written by: Frank Thompson
- Directed by: Michael A. Simon
- Presented by: Jason Kennedy
- Starring: Rodney Perry
- Announcer: Joe Cipriano
- Theme music composer: John Nooney
- Country of origin: United States
- No. of seasons: 1
- No. of episodes: 5

Production
- Executive producers: Greg Goldman; Chris Coelen; Brian A. Veskosky
- Producers: Michael Goss; Matt Leasch; Andrew Lipson; Steven Patterson-Rosso; Mike Duffy
- Running time: 42-44 Minutes
- Production companies: Metro Entertainment; RDF USA

Original release
- Network: ABC
- Release: June 27 – July 11, 2008

Dance Machine is an American dance game show and competition that premiered on June 27, 2008 on ABC. The show was hosted by Jason Kennedy. It was created by RDF USA.

Due to the show's low ratings, ABC announced that the series was cancelled after three episodes. Repeats of America's Funniest Home Videos replaced Dance Machine, beginning July 18, 2008.

The series started airing in Australia on December 6, 2008 during the Winter non-ratings period on Saturday nights at 8:30 PM. However, due to low ratings, after one episode the show was moved to air weekdays at 3:00 PM starting on December 22.

== Game format ==
=== Round 1 ===
Six dancers were introduced from the dancing podium and three dancing routines were shown (i.e. disco, boy bands, Michael Jackson, etc.). The randomizer then chooses a power dancer from the dance . The power dancer then chooses a dance routine and a partner to face with. The DJ (sometimes wearing props for the routine) tells everyone the name of the artist and song. The power dancer dances to the song first and then the partner. At the end, only the studio audience could vote. The results were shown after the first commercial break, after the interview with what the audience selected, and after what moves the dancer made, after the first and second commercial break only. The dancer with the most vote moves on and goes to the safe zone while the other turns in his/her dancing shoes. The process is repeated until there is two dancers and one dancing routine left. The randomizer selects the power dancer and the power dancer must either pass to a partner or dance. The top 3 semifinalists move on after this round.

=== Round 2: Freestyle Semifinals ===
The randomizer selects a power dancer from the three semifinalists and the power dancer was given an option to dance or pass it to one of his/her opponent. Before each dancer dances, he/she tells the host the name of the song and artist he/she is dancing and why he/she chose that song. The dancer then chooses one of the five props from the prop wall and begins dancing. A whooshing sound signals the dancer to dance with his/her prop. After he/she dances, either the power dancer who did not dance yet would pass or play, or the randomizer would choose a new power dancer who will be given an option to pass or play. The new dancer would choose a prop that was not chosen yet in the prop wall. The last dancer or a power dancer who did not dance yet will dance and take one of the 3 props from the prop wall. After the commercial break, the results will be announced in no particular order. The top 2 finalists would move on to the final round while the other dancer has danced his/her last dance.

=== Round 3: $100,000 Dance Off ===
The finalists dances to two songs chosen by the DJ which features the artist's name and the song's name. In the first episode, the randomizer would select the final power dancer and would dance to either the first song or the second song. The first dancer would dance to the first song until he/she hears a whooshing sound which signals the opponent to take over. The process is repeated in the second song until the final whooshing sound signals both dancers to dance to the final verse of the second song. The results were shown after the final commercial break. Each dancer shows the viewers how he/she got there as well as what to do with the money (which was removed in the final episodes). The host will announce only the winner of the show.

The winner will win $100,000 and the Dance Machine Disco Bubble while the runner-up dances home empty-handed. Towards the end, the eliminated dancers would cheer on the winner.

== French version ==
An equally short-lived French adaptation of the show aired on TF1 in the same year called Dance Floor: Qui sera le plus fort?("Dance Floor: Who Will Be the Strongest?") hosted by Laurence Boccolini along with DJ William as co-host. The French version aired from September 8 through September 19, 2008.

== Ratings and results ==
#	Air Date	Rating	Share	18-49	Viewers	Weekly Winner
1	June 27, 2008	TBA	TBA	1.0/4 (#3)	3.76 (#4)	Mixed Martial Artist Jeff Kelley
2	July 4, 2008	TBA	TBA	TBA	TBA	Air Force Engineer John Edwards
3	July 11, 2008	TBA	TBA	0.7/3 (#5)	3.21 (#4)	Youth Counselor Justin Meece
4	July 24, 2008*	N/A	N/A	N/A	N/A	Wedding DJ Chris Dixon
5	July 24, 2008*	N/A	N/A	N/A	N/A	Sales Rep. Oscar Ledezma

* - Episodes 4 and 5 aired only online on ABC.com.
