= Louis Aguirre =

American news anchor

- Born: Louis Juan Aguirre; November 12, 1966 (age 59); Miami, Florida, U.S.
- Education: University of Miami (B.S./B.A.)
- Years active: 1989–present
- Known for: Television anchor

Louis Juan Aguirre (born November 12, 1966) is an American news anchor currently at WPLG hosting Local 10 World News. He is a former anchor covering the entertainment field for The Insider, and was the co-anchor of Deco Drive, a weeknight entertainment show on WSVN in Miami, FL.

== Early life ==
Aguirre was born Louis Juan Aguirre in Miami, Florida on November 12, 1966, to mother Aida and father Louis Juan Aguirre, who is an engineer. Aguirre graduated from Belen Jesuit Preparatory School in 1984 and later attended the University of Miami and the Université de Paris at La Sorbonne. He graduated from the University of Miami with a Bachelor of Science in Communications and a Bachelor of Arts in French.

== Career ==
Louis began his TV career at Telemundo in 1989 as a Spanish language reporter, where he received his first Emmy Award nomination for a series chronicling the AIDS Crisis in America. In 1990, Aguirre joined South Florida's ABC station, WPLG as a reporter later becoming weekend anchor after scoring a coveted interview with Cuban dictator Fidel Castro. In 1994, Aguirre left South Florida for Hollywood to become a correspondent for Extra that led to a spot as a lead correspondent for A Current Affair and was later appointed as the first co-host for Fox News Channel's morning newscast Fox & Friends.

Louis voiced Cortez/Manny Chavez and the minor character Adrian in Funcom's The Longest Journey adventure game, released in 1999.

He returned to South Florida in 2003 as WSVN's entertainment reporter and anchor for Deco Drive, the station's wildly popular entertainment show. In 2004 he won his first Emmy Award for his special report, “Miracles in the Making”.

In 2005, People en Español magazine named Aguirre one of 25 most sexy bachelors, and was selected as South Florida's American Idol insider since 2004 for his insight and commentary during each American Idol season.

On August 22, 2014, Louis announced on Deco Drive with his co-host Lynn Martinez, he will be leaving the show and heading to Los Angeles, California to further his career. On September 9, 2014, he replaced Kevin Frazier as co-host of The Insider alongside Thea Andrews.

That assignment ended in September 2017 when the show was cancelled after a 13-year run. Aguirre quickly relocated back to South Florida, returning to WPLG to anchor the 4:30 and 5:30 p.m. newscasts and serve as a reporter for the 11 p.m. shows. As part of the station's disaffiliation with the ABC network, he anchors the Local 10 World News newscast.

== Personal life ==
He appeared in numerous commercials and guest starred on hit shows such as Sex and the City, JAG, Burn Notice, Guiding Light and All My Children.

On August 3, 2009, Aguirre co-hosted with Kelly Ripa on Live with Regis and Kelly as part of a contest, speaking with guests Sienna Miller and Joan Rivers.
