= Melanie Bromley =

British journalist

- Born: London, England, UK
- Education: University of Wales, Swansea
- Occupations: Entertainment journalist and broadcaster

Melanie Bromley is an American-based British-born entertainment journalist and broadcaster who is currently Head of News Operations & Chief News Correspondent for E! News, where she covers celebrity news.

== Early life and education ==
Bromley attended the University of Wales, Swansea where she earned a Bachelor of Science undergraduate degree in Geography. She then continued her education at City University, London attaining a master's degree in Broadcast Journalism, specializing in financial journalism.

== Career ==
Bromley became the European Bureau chief for Us Weekly in 2003, overseeing all international news coverage for the magazine. In 2007, she moved to Los Angeles, California to take up the role of West Coast Bureau Chief.

In 2012, Bromley joined E! News and E! Online as Senior Correspondent, overseeing newsgathering across both platforms. Four months after joining E!, she was promoted to Senior Managing Correspondent. In 2014, Bromley was promoted again to Chief News Correspondent.

In her role Bromley regularly appears on a variety of shows across the network from E! News, Live From E! and E! News specials. She helped spearhead coverage of the 2012 Olympic Games in London, and the birth of Prince George.

Bromley also appears as a pop culture expert on other U.S. networks and in her native UK. She has been featured on CNN, Good Morning America, The Today Show, BBC, Sky News and Daybreak among many others. Bromley has also been quoted in the Washington Post, Financial Times, The Sunday Times of London, Vanity Fair and other international print publications.
