= Victoria Recaño =

American television personality (born 1975)

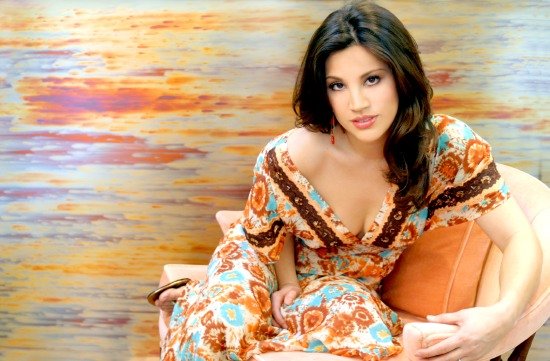
- Recaño in May 2006
- Born: July 2, 1975 (age 51); St. Louis, Missouri, U.S.
- Education: Loyola University of Chicago
- Occupation: News anchor
- Years active: 1990–present
- Employer: KTLA (2009–2010)
- Spouse: Tom Burwell (m. 2001)
- Children: 4
- Awards: 3 Emmy Awards

Victoria Recaño (born July 2, 1975) is an American television personality currently working for Inside Edition. Her previous jobs including being a special correspondent and media expert for TV Guide Network and co-anchoring the 6 pm and 10 pm news on Los Angeles television station KTLA. She did that work from September 14, 2009 until late May 2010, when she left the show without any announcement by either her or KTLA. Prior to co-anchoring for KTLA, she was a correspondent and host on The Insider.

== Biography ==
Recaño is the oldest of four children and is of Filipino descent. Her father emigrated to the United States to pursue a career in medicine. Her mother was German-Hungarian. She studied dancing and piano, and attended high school at Cor Jesu Academy.

At the age of 15 she auditioned for a kids' show on local station KPLR-TV, called Team 11, that was seeking young people between the ages of 13 and 23 who could also sing, dance and act, for an after-school television variety show. Recaño was chosen, and became one of four reporters on the show to produce news featurettes on subjects such as anorexia, depression, divorce, and the environment. She also hosted The Disney Afternoon, for which she won two Emmy Awards.

After high school, Recaño attended Loyola University of Chicago, from which she graduated magna cum laude, receiving a bachelor's degree in mass communications. Her early goal had been to be a physician like her father, and her initial major was in biology, but she eventually decided to return to journalism.

In 1996, she joined KPLR's News at Nine as a general assignment reporter. From 1998–2001, she was the news anchor for ZDTV, later renamed as TechTV News. After ZDTV, she worked as an anchor and reporter for KNTV, the NBC affiliate in San Francisco. In July 2002, she joined Inside Edition.

In 2004, she was named as a correspondent for the new television newsmagazine The Insider.

== Personal life ==
In 2001 Recaño married mortgage consultant Tom Burwell. The couple's first child, a girl, was born on February 22, 2009. She currently lives in Los Angeles. The couple announced in June 2013 that they were expecting a son, who would be born that December. The couple would welcome another son in January 2015. In October 2017 she revealed her pregnancy with her fourth child, a daughter.

== Guest appearances ==
In May 2006, Recaño appeared as herself in an episode of CSI: Miami, entitled "Shock".

In February 2008, Recaño was a celebrity guest model on the game show Deal or No Deal.

In March 2012, Recaño appeared in the second episode of the eighteenth cycle of America's Next Top Model as a reporter for "ANTM TV" during the first "Tyra Mail".
