= Leonard Lyons =

American newspaper columnist (1906–1976)

- Born: September 10, 1906; New York City, New York, U.S.
- Died: October 7, 1976 (aged 70); New York City, New York, U.S.
- Occupation: Newspaper columnist
- Years active: 1929-1974
- Spouse: Sylvia Ruth Schonberger (m. 1934)
- Children: 4, including Jeffrey Lyons
- Relatives: Margaret Lyons (granddaughter)

Leonard Lyons (born Leonard Sucher; 10 September 1906 - 7 October 1976) was an American newspaper columnist, best known for his New York Post column called "The Lyons Den."

== Early life ==
Leonard Lyons was born Leonard Sucher on September 10, 1906, in New York City. He grew up in a large family of Jewish immigrants from the town of Horodenka in the Austro-Hungarian Empire. His father Moses, a tailor, died when he was six. His mother sold cigarettes and candy on the Lower East Side. He graduated from the High School of Commerce, where his classmates included Lou Gehrig. He graduated from the City College of New York and was in the first class of graduates from St. John's University School of Law.

== Career ==
Lyons was admitted to the New York State bar in 1929, and practiced law for five years.

As a side activity, Leonard Sucher began a weekly column for the English-language page of the Jewish Daily Forward, called "East of Broadway". He applied for a post as a Broadway columnist with the New York Post, and won the job. The editor of the Post gave Sucher an alternative last name, Lyons, for professional use, and thus he became "Leonard Lyons", an alliterative name reminiscent of Walter Winchell, another noted newspaper columnist of the day.

Lyons' first column appeared May 20, 1934, under the banner of "The Lyons Den", a name devised by Walter Winchell. Lyons worked on "The Lyons Den" 6 days per week, producing as many columns per week, covering theater, movies, politics and art, a total of which by the end of his career would reach 12,000 columns. Carl Sandburg once said of Lyons: "Imagine how much richer American history would have been had there been a Leonard Lyons in Lincoln's time..." Lyons travelled the world and sent back daily columns, sometimes giving his column to New York-bound travelers with a request they contact the paper upon arrival. He avoided writing about scandal in his column, and thus earned the trust of the many figures he met. One characterisation of his column was as follows: "Lyons... never breaks a confidence, and except for a few personal feuds, notably with Walter Winchell and Bennett Cerf, never spits venom in his column." The column became a New York institution, and was syndicated nationally first by King Features Syndicate. In 1941, the McNaught Syndicate took over syndication of the column. By 1974, the circulation of "The Lyons Den" had diminished to 18 columns, and Lyons retired with his last column on the exact 40th anniversary of the column, 20 May 1974.

== Personal life and death ==
Lyons and his wife Sylvia were married in November 1934. Their marriage lasted until Lyons' death, and produced four sons: George, a stock broker, Warren, a theatrical producer and singing coach, Jeffrey, a film and theatre critic, and Douglas, a criminal defense attorney. Leonard Lyons' grandson and Jeffrey Lyons' son is the television personality Ben Lyons. Both Jeffrey Lyons and Ben Lyons have continued to use the name "The Lyons Den" in their respective news outlets for their work.

Leonard Lyons died age 71 on October 7, 1976, in New York City.

== Honors, awards ==
New York Mayor John V. Lindsay invited him to City Hall and presented him with a medal and a proclamation honoring him. On the 100th anniversary of his birth, New York Mayor Michael Bloomberg issued another proclamation in his name.
