= Live from E! =

- Genre: Talk show
- Presented by: Jason Kennedy; Maria Menounos; Ross Matthews
- Country of origin: United States
- Original language: English

Production
- Camera setup: Multiple
- Running time: 30 minutes (inc. adverts)

Original release
- Network: E!
- Release: September 9, 2013 – November 15, 2019

Live from E! is an American pop culture-based talk show hosted by Jason Kennedy, Maria Menounos, Ross Matthews and a fourth rotating co-host, which premiered online on 9 September 2013. The program discusses pop culture news with their panel, and incorporates social media activity during the broadcast.

From September 8, 2014, the program began airing on E!, becoming the network's first program to cross over to a linear broadcast from online.

The program is filmed on the same set as sister program E! News in Los Angeles.

The show aired its final episode on November 15, 2019.

== See also ==
- List of programs broadcast by E!
