= The Late Bloomer =

2016 film by Kevin Pollak

- Theatrical release poster
- Directed by: Kevin Pollak
- Screenplay by: Joe Nussbaum; Paul A. Kaplan; Mark Torgove; Kyle Cooper; Austyn Jeffs
- Story by: Joe Nussbaum; Gary Rosen
- Based on: Man Made: A Memoir of My Body by Ken Baker
- Produced by: Heidi Jo Markel; Raphael Kryszek; Jesse Israel
- Starring: Johnny Simmons; Maria Bello; Brittany Snow; Jane Lynch; J. K. Simmons; Kumail Nanjiani; Beck Bennett; Paul Wesley
- Cinematography: Akis Konstantakopoulos
- Edited by: Adam Beamer
- Music by: Walter Murphy
- Production companies: Ineffable Pictures; Eclectic Pictures; Millennium Films
- Distributed by: Momentum Pictures
- Release dates: September 30, 2016 (SDFF); October 7, 2016 (United States)
- Running time: 90 minutes
- Country: United States
- Language: English

The Late Bloomer is a 2016 American romantic comedy-drama film directed by Kevin Pollak and written by Gary Rosen, Joe Nussbaum, Paul A. Kaplan & Mark Torgove, and Kyle Cooper & Austyn Jeffs. The film stars Johnny Simmons, Maria Bello, Brittany Snow, Jane Lynch, J. K. Simmons, Kumail Nanjiani, Beck Bennett, and Paul Wesley, and is based on journalist Ken Baker's autobiography Man Made: A Memoir of My Body, in which he detailed experiencing puberty for the first time at age 27.

The film received its world premiere at the San Diego Film Festival, where it won Best Comedy. It opened with both a limited release theatrically and through video on demand on October 7, 2016, released by Momentum Pictures. The film received generally negative reviews.

== Plot ==
Dr. Peter Newmans is a thirty-year-old sex therapist who has written a best selling book about how sex can be a distraction from success. His friends and family question why he has never had a romantic relationship and is completely uninterested in sexual desires. Peter has developed a close relationship with his neighbor, Michelle. When Michelle breaks up with her workaholic boyfriend, Peter comforts her and Michelle kisses him. Peter panics and begins to suffer from a migraine, a problem he has been experiencing with increasing frequency.

The next morning he plays basketball with his friends; he is hit in the groin and falls unconscious. During his examination, the hospital staff poke fun at Peter's under-developed testicles. Medical imaging tests confirm he has a long-term benign brain tumor pressed against his pituitary gland. This caused him never to experience puberty.

Elated to learn he can possibly fix the issue, Peter insists that a procedure be undertaken immediately to remove the tumor. After a successful excision, he stays with his parents to recover. Peter becomes frustrated as time passes with no changes; his friends hire a stripper to arouse him but this also has no effect. Peter does finally obtain an erection, and begins to experience the side-effects of puberty.

Peter experiences excessive libido, mood swings, voice changes, and severe acne. After Michelle leaves for a cooking retreat, his symptoms become progressively more severe. During a FaceTime call with her, he lashes out because of his unfamiliar feelings of jealousy. He confides in his teenage neighbor, who suggests he engage in casual sex. Peter begins using Tinder and has sex with many different women.

When Michelle returns, she accepts a date with Peter. Peter acts rude and conceited, causing Michelle to become upset. Having ostracized his friends and now Michelle, Peter becomes depressed. When he tries to receive oral sex from one of his patients, he is caught by his boss and subsequently fired. Forced to come to terms with his situation, Peter has a heart-to-heart with his father.

Reflecting on his book, Peter concludes that a person should have all the consensual adult sex possible, and society should cease to sex-shame individuals. Peter apologizes to his friends and eventually to Michelle. They enter into a relationship and she becomes pregnant with their child. Peter writes a book for teenage boys about how to become proper men, and he and Michelle live happily ever after.

== Cast ==
- Johnny Simmons as Dr. Peter Newmans, a sex therapist.
- J. K. Simmons as James Newmans, Peter's father.
- Maria Bello as Brenda Newmans, Peter's mother.
- Brittany Snow as Michelle, the woman next door, pursued by Peter.
- Jane Lynch as Caroline, head of the office where Peter works.
- Paul Wesley as Charlie
- Kumail Nanjiani as Rich, Peter's friend and another wingman.
- Beck Bennett as Luke, Peter's friend and wingman.
- Illeana Douglas as Linda
- Ken Marino as Dr. Hanson
- Sam Robards as Dr. Lawson
- Blake Cooper as Josh, Peter's young friend.
- Vanessa Ragland as Jenny
- Lenora Crichlow as Nikki
- Charlotte McKinney as Patient
- Jason Antoon as Kenny
- Matt Jones as Max
- Greg Cromer as Paramedic
- Brian Doyle-Murray as Stagehand

== Production ==
Alcon Entertainment acquired the film rights to the journalist Ken Baker's autobiographical book Man Made: A Memoir of My Body in 2008, with a script set to be written by Gary Rosen. The film would be based on the true story of Baker, who went through his puberty in three weeks at the age of 27. The delaying of his puberty and normal development was caused by a benign tumor in his brain. The film's titling as The Late Bloomer was first announced in January 2010, as Alcon was developing the film. At the time, Andrew Kosove and Broderick Johnson were attached as producers, and the studio was re-imagining the idea into a comedy by hiring Joe Nussbaum to write a new draft of the script.

In October 2012, it was announced that the film was to be directed by Randall Einhorn and would star Elijah Wood. The script had been written by Nussbaum, and rewritten by Paul A. Kaplan & Mark Torgove. The film was set to be produced by Jesse Israel of Ineffable Pictures and Brent Emery of Coup d'Etat Films, with financing by Dignity Film Finance.

In May 2015, it was announced that the film would now be directed by Kevin Pollak, making his narrative debut. Raphael Kryszek and Israel would produce the film for Ineffable, along with Heidi Jo Markel for Eclectic. In August 2015, a new cast was announced, including Johnny Simmons in the lead role of sex therapist Dr. Peter Newmans, whose experiences mirror those of Baker in real life. Jane Lynch would play Caroline, head of the office where he works, Maria Bello and J. K. Simmons his parents, Brittany Snow the woman he pursues, and Beck Bennett, Kumail Nanjiani, and Blake Cooper his friends. Other cast members include Paul Wesley, Ken Marino, Illeana Douglas, Charlotte McKinney, Vanessa Ragland, and Lenora Crichlow. The latest draft of the film was revealed to have been written by Kyle Cooper and Austyn Jeffs, and Conor Charles was announced as co-producer.

=== Filming ===
Principal photography on the film began in late August 2015 in Los Angeles, and wrapped in Bulgaria on September 5, 2015.

== Release and reception ==
In April 2016, Momentum Pictures acquired U.S distribution rights to the film. It had its world premiere at the San Diego Film Festival on September 30, 2016, where it won Best Comedy. It was released in a theatrical limited release and through video on demand on October 7, 2016.

On review aggregator Rotten Tomatoes, the film holds an approval rating of 20% based on 10 reviews, with an average rating of 4.5/10. On Metacritic, the film has a weighted average score of 34 out of 100, based on 7 critics, indicating "generally unfavorable reviews".

The Hollywood Reporter wrote that while Johnny Simmons fits his role perfectly, and secondary actors such as J.K. Simmons, Jane Lynch, Laraine Newman, Illeana Douglas, Maria Bello and Brian Doyle-Murray, have fun in their stereotypical scenes, J.K. Simmons and Maria Bello in particular seem overqualified for their roles.
