= Keltie Knight =

Canadian television personality, author, and producer

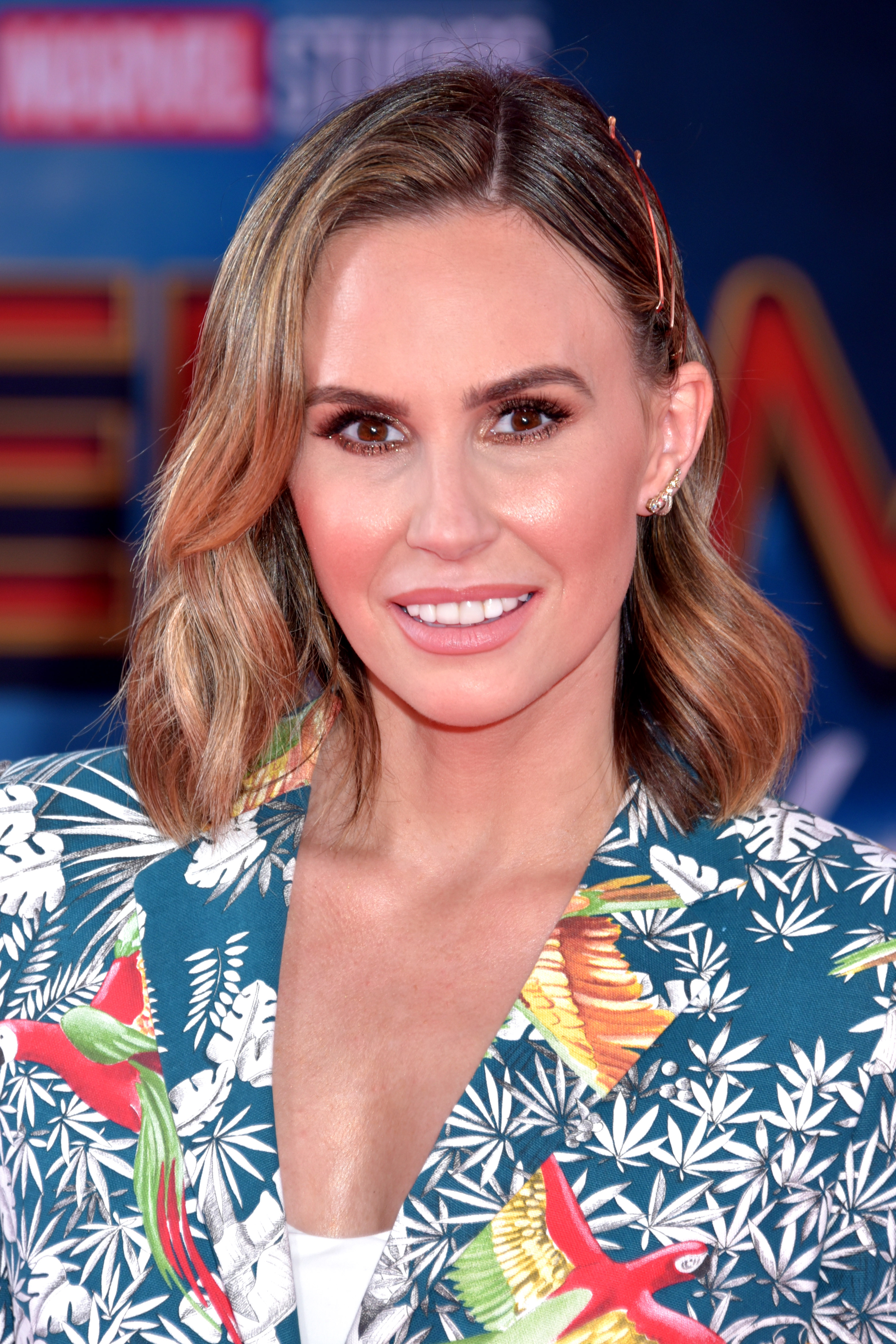
- Knight in 2019
- Born: Keltie Colleen Knight; January 28, 1982 (age 44); Edmonton, Alberta, Canada
- Occupations: Television personality, producer, author, dancer
- Years active: 2007–present
- Notable work: E! News, The Insider, LadyGang, Superfan
- Spouse: Chris Knight (m. 2013)
- Awards: Daytime Emmy Award (3)

Keltie Colleen Knight (born January 28, 1982) is a three-time Emmy Award-winning Canadian television personality, author, and producer. She is best known as the co-host of E! News and E! From the Red Carpet, as well as the co-creator of the LadyGang podcast. Knight is also the creator and executive producer of the CBS primetime musical game show Superfan.

== Career ==
Knight began her career as a professional dancer, performing as a Radio City Rockette for six seasons. She was a member of the New Jersey Nets and New York Knicks dance teams and appeared as a specialist dancer in the films Enchanted (2007) and Footloose (2011).

In 2012, Knight joined The Insider as a correspondent, later becoming a weekend co-host. In 2017, she transitioned to Entertainment Tonight as a correspondent and fill-in anchor.

In 2022, Knight was named chief correspondent for the revival of E! News and was promoted to co-host in March 2024. Following the program's final television broadcast on September 25, 2025, Knight continued to lead the brand's transition into a digital-first platform. She has anchored major live events including the Grammy Awards Red Carpet Live and the Thanksgiving Day Parade on CBS. In 2024, she served as a host of the Miss USA 2024 pageant alongside Garcelle Beauvais.

In 2015, Knight co-founded LadyGang with Becca Tobin and Jac Vanek. The podcast has surpassed 300 million downloads and was adapted into a television series on E!. Knight is the creator and executive producer of the CBS series Superfan, which premiered on August 9, 2023.

== Health and advocacy ==
Knight has used her platform to advocate for women's health transparency following her diagnosis of microcytic anemia. In 2024, she documented her decision to undergo a total hysterectomy to address chronic health issues. Her 2026 book, The F*ck Them Theory, explores these themes of self-advocacy and agency.

== Personal life ==
In 2013, Knight married Chris Knight, general manager of Roc Nation. The couple renewed their wedding vows in December 2019.

== Bibliography ==
- Act Like a Lady (2020) – New York Times Bestseller
- Lady Secrets (2022)
- The F*ck Them Theory: Self-Help for People Who Are Done Being the Bigger Person (2026)
