= Dagny Hultgreen =

American actress

Dagny Hultgreen (born September 19, 1962) is an American film actress and entertainment reporter. She was born in Greenwich, Connecticut, and spent her childhood there and in Chicago and Toronto. Her family moved to San Antonio when she was studying broadcast journalism at the University of Texas.

== Career ==
Hultgreen began her on-air career in August, 1988, with a five-year contract as a weekend news anchor at WPXI in Pittsburgh. A personnel realignment resulted in her leaving the next September. From 1991-1993, she was an anchor and correspondent on E! News on E!: Entertainment Television, where she co-hosted a special on the nominations for the 1993 Academy Awards. In 1993, she was the first entertainment reporter on Good Day, L.A. on KTTV in Los Angeles. In 1996, she appeared in E! News Live.

Her film roles include minor parts in Martial Law II: Undercover (1992) and the Academy Award-winning Speed (1994).

== Personal life ==
Hultgreen is married to producer Michael Dubelko, with whom she has three daughters. She is the older sister of the late Kara Hultgreen, the first female Navy carrier fighter pilot.
