= Lauren Scruggs (blogger) =

American fashion blogger and author

Lauren Scruggs Kennedy is an American fashion blogger and author who received international media attention after a December 3, 2011 incident in which she walked into a spinning propeller, losing her left eye and severing her left hand. On August 9, 2012, she made her first public appearance following the accident during an interview on the Today show.

== Personal life ==
On May 30, 2014, Scruggs became engaged to television personality Jason Kennedy. The couple were married on December 12, 2014. Lauren and Jason welcomed their son, Ryver Rhodes Kennedy, on April 3, 2022. Their daughter, Poppy Ford Kennedy, was born October 10, 2023.

Her first book, Still Lolo: A Spinning Propeller, a Horrific Accident, and a Family's Journey of Hope, was published in 2012 and her second book, Your Beautiful Heart, was released in March 2015.

She is founder of the Lauren Scruggs Kennedy Foundation, which provides prostheses to women in need.

Scruggs is a Christian.
