= Ben Lyons =

American entertainment reporter and sportscaster

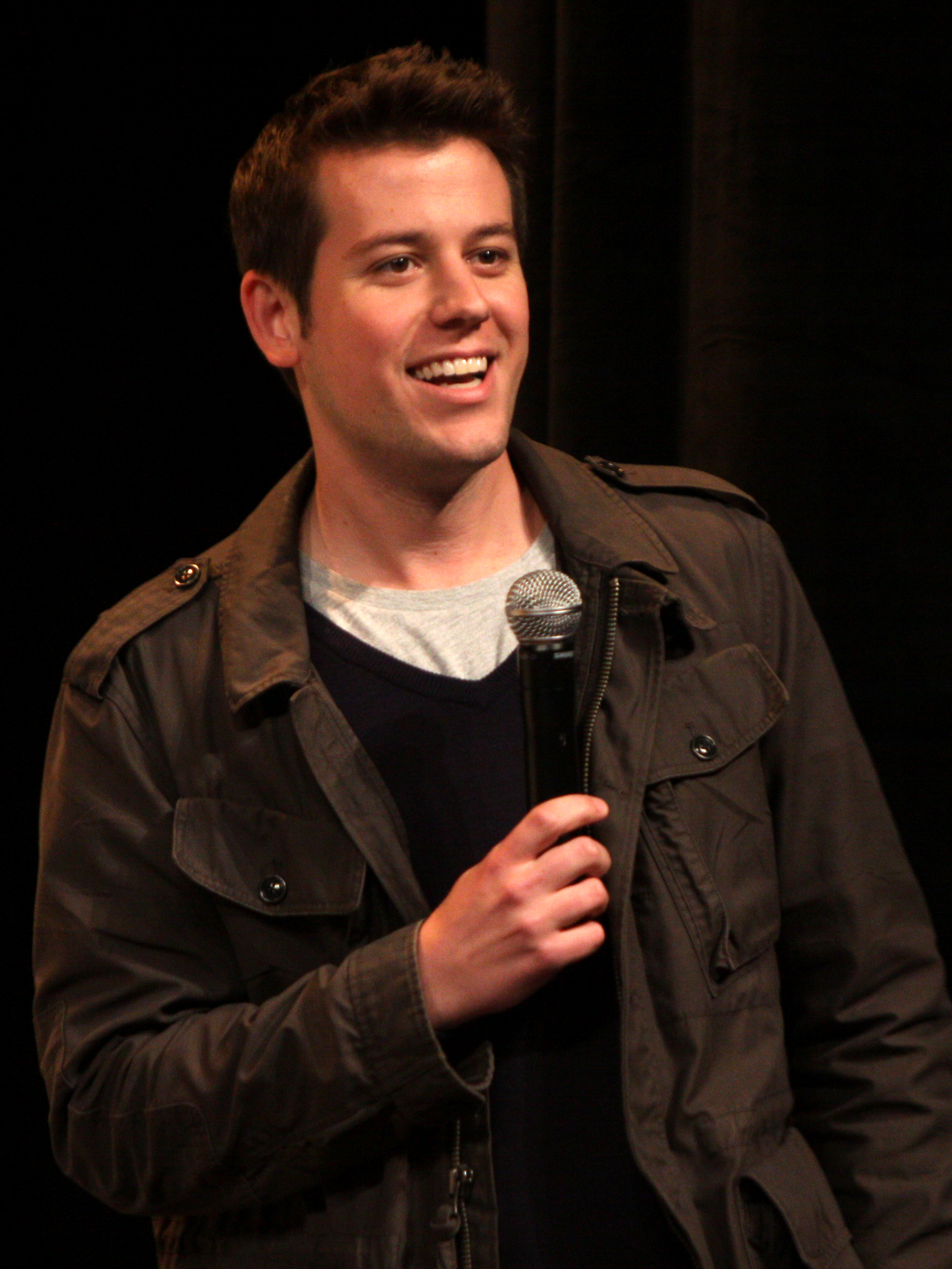
- Lyons in March 2012
- Born: Benjamin Lyons; October 8, 1981 (age 45); New York City, U.S.
- Occupations: Entertainment reporter, sportscaster
- Years active: 2002–present
- Relatives: Margaret Lyons (cousin)

Benjamin Lyons (born October 8, 1981) is an American entertainment reporter and sportscaster. He is the co-host of Bonjour Sports Talk on Amazon Prime Video's sports channel Sports Talk.

== Early life ==
Lyons is the son of entertainment reporter Jeffrey Lyons and the grandson of the American newspaper columnist Leonard Lyons. His cousin, Margaret Lyons, is a television critic for The New York Times.

== Career ==
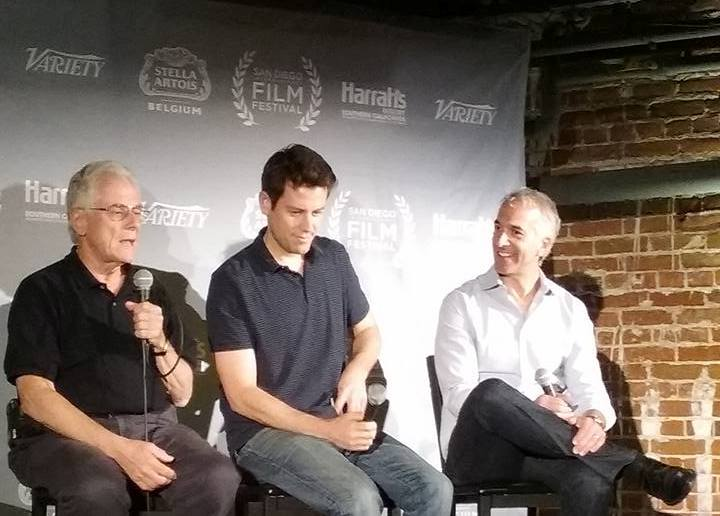
Lyons (middle) with father Jeffrey Lyons and film critic Scott Mantz at the 2016 San Diego International Film Festival

Lyons started his own production company in 2002 and produced segments for the TV show, Hip-Hop Nation. In 2004, MTV hired him to co-host Your Movie Show. In 2006, Lyons hosted entertainment segments on The Daily 10. In addition, he began to write a column for E! Online called "The Lyons Den". Lyons hosted My Family's Got GUTS, revival of the original Nickelodeon Guts on Nickelodeon and has appeared in Disaster Movie and The House Bunny. He is a regular contributor to Good Morning America. In 2012, Lyons left E! and became a correspondent on Extra. Lyons also joined ESPN as a commentator in 2012.

In September 2008, Lyons became co-host of the TV show, At the Movies, alongside Ben Mankiewicz of Turner Classic Movies (TCM). His appointment to the show drew criticism from fans and film journalists, who believed he was ineloquent when discussing movies and that he lacked a proper understanding of film history. He was also accused of tailoring quotes with an aim of them being used in advertising campaigns, and associating with actors whose work he reviews, which could be seen as a conflict of interest. Roger Ebert, the original host of the show who stepped down due to health issues, gave implied criticism of Lyons in his online blog. Lyons and Mankiewicz were both replaced as the show's hosts in August 2009.

Lyons also hosts a podcast of The Players' Tribune. Lyons is ESPN Sports Commentator. Lyons was named Fathom Events host in April 2016.

In 2022, Embassy Row announced that Lyons will co-host Bonjour Sports Talk with Madelyn Burke on Amazon Prime Video. On November 14, 2022, Lyons made his debut with co-host Madelyn Burke on Bonjour Sports Talk.

== Filmography ==
=== Film ===
Year	Title	Role	Notes
2004	Blue Boy	Josh Dubont	Short film
2007	Star Wars at 30	Himself	
2008	Hot Summer 25	Host	TV movie
2008	National School Scrabble Championship	Host	TV special
2008	The House Bunny	Limbo Guy	
2009	E! Special: Hot Holiday Movie Guide	Host	TV special
2010	Dark Moon	Himself	Video short
2012	Beauty and the Least: The Misadventures of Ben Banks	Vernon	
2013	AMC Lone Ranger Q & A	Himself	TV special
2015	Paper Towns Live Event Concert	Host	
2016	A Stand Up Guy	The Host - Ian Cams	
2019	HFPA Presents: Globes Red Carpet Live	Host	TV special
2020	Blackjack: The Jackie Ryan Story	Coach Carlisle	
2023	Attack of the Doc	Himself	

=== Television ===
Year	Title	Role	Notes
2005	Reel Talk	Himself	
2006-2009	The Daily 10	Himself	52 episodes
2007-2012	E! Live from the Red Carpet	Himself/Movie Expert/Host	16 episodes
2007	Biography	Himself	2 episodes
2008-2009	At the Movies	Co-Host	25 episodes
2008-2009	My Family's Got Guts	Host	22 episodes
2008	E! True Hollywood Story	Himself	Episode: "Oprah"
2008	Keith Powell Directs a Play	Himself	Episode: "Press Tour"
2009	Talkshow with Spike Feresten	Himself	Episode: "Dr. Drew Pinsky/Ben Lyons/G. Love"
2009	Xpose	Himself	1 episode
2009	Who Wants to Be a Millionaire	Guest Expert	2 episodes
2009	The Bonnie Hunt Show	Himself	1 episode
2009	90210	Reporter	Episode: "Okaeri, Donna!"
2009	Entourage	Interviewer	Episode: "Amongst Friends"
2010-2019	The Wendy Williams Show	Himself/Guest/Film Critic	9 episodes
2010	Joy Behar: Say Anything!	Himself	1 episode
2010	Extreme Close Up	Himself	
2010	The Gentlemen's League	Ben	
2011	Breakfast	Intern Aware	1 episode
2012	Big Morning Buzz Live	Himself	Episode: "Common/Creed"
2012	Extra	Host	6 episodes
2014	Access Sportsnet: Los Angeles	ESPN Radio Host	1 episode
2014	Steve Harvey	Himself/Film Critic	3 episodes
2015	Real Husbands of Hollywood	Himself	Episode: "Vote for Kidney"
2016	IMDb Originals	Himself	Episode: "Breaking Down the Golden Globe Movie Drama Contenders"
2016	The Meredith Vieira Show	Himself	Episode: "Actor Malcolm-Jamal Warner/Oscar Predictions/How to Get Red Capet Hair at Home!"
2016	Top Photographer	Himself	Episode: "In Motion"
2016	In the Locker Room with Cuttino Mobley	Himself	
2017-2018	The Oscars: All Access	Host	2 episodes
2017	On the Line	Himself	2 episodes
2018	Mostly Football	Host	
2018	The 5th Quarter	Karl	Episode: "The Oh-No No-No"
2019	The Issue Is	Himself	3 episodes
2019	Front Row Flynn	Moderator	Episode: "HONEY BOY: Martin Starr, Alma Har'el, moderator Ben Lyons"
2020	MMI: Charity Celebrity Bowling Tournament	Himself	
2021	The Rich Eisen Show	Guest Host	4 episodes

== Accolades ==
Lyons was inducted into the Southern California Sports Hall of Fame in 2020.
