= Reel Talk =

- Genre: Talk show
- Presented by: Jeffrey Lyons; Alison Bailes
- Country of origin: United States
- Original language: English

Production
- Running time: 30 minutes
- Production company: WNBC

Original release
- Release: 2005 – 2009

Reel Talk is a syndicated weekend movie review series hosted by film critics Jeffrey Lyons and Alison Bailes. It was produced by, and originally ran exclusively on, WNBC, a New York City NBC affiliate.

== Airtimes ==
The show initially aired as part of NBC All Night on Fridays and Saturdays. The show usually aired at 4:00 a.m. on late Friday nights and/or late Saturday nights at 2:00 a.m. It then launched into syndication in September 2007 via NBC Universal Domestic Television Distribution. The program In Wine Country took the place of Reel Talk on the NBC All Night schedule.

== Production and website ==
The show was produced by WNBC. Michael Avila was Executive Producer of Reel Talk.

In conjunction with the show's syndicated debut, an interactive website www.ReelTalkTV.com was simultaneously launched, offering viewers video reviews, extended interviews with celebrities, special web only features and trailers.

== Celebrity guests ==
Past celebrities on the show have been:

- Sean Penn
- Judi Dench
- Kirk Douglas
- Donald Sutherland
- Kiefer Sutherland
- Antonio Banderas
- Pierce Brosnan
- Samuel L. Jackson
- Morgan Freeman
- George Clooney
- Forest Whitaker

== Cancellation ==
On May 28, 2009, NBC Universal announced the cancellation of Reel Talk due to Jeffrey Lyons and Alison Bailes losing their jobs with WNBC. The last edition of Reel Talk aired in late June 2009.
