= Debbie Matenopoulos =

American television host, journalist, and lifestyle expert

- Born: Despina Matenopoulos; December 13, 1974 (age 51); Richmond, Virginia, U.S.
- Education: John Randolph Tucker High School
- Alma mater: Virginia Commonwealth University; New York University (BA)
- Occupations: Television host, television personality, actress
- Years active: 1997–present
- Spouses: Jay Faires (m. 2003; div. 2008) Jon Falcone (m. 2013)
- Children: 1

Despina "Debbie" Matenopoulos (born December 13, 1974) is an American television host, journalist, and lifestyle expert.

== Early life ==
Matenopoulos was born in Richmond, Virginia, of Greek ancestry. She is the daughter of Efrosini, a hair stylist, and Nicolaos T. Matenopoulos, a furniture maker, She also has an older sister, Maria, and older brother, Ike. Her birth name is Despina Matenopoulos, named after her grandmother. Despina was later anglicized to Debbie.

Matenopoulos went to John Randolph Tucker High School, and then attended Virginia Commonwealth University for one year before transferring to the Journalism Department at New York University. She was a member of the women's fraternity Alpha Omicron Pi. While at NYU she also worked at MTV as an intern. She quickly moved up the ranks, soon becoming story coordinator for MTV News: Unfiltered.

== TV career ==
In 1997, Matenopoulos was an MTV production assistant and, after a chance meeting with Barbara Walters was invited to audition and was cast, at age 22, as the youngest co-host on Walters's new talk show, The View. She was parodied on Saturday Night Live by Ana Gasteyer, Claire Danes, Cameron Diaz, and Sarah Michelle Gellar as being an uninformed ditz and eventually invited to appear on SNL as a guest, where she played herself. In January 1999, her contract with the show was not renewed, and she was replaced by Lisa Ling. Later that same year, she joined the TV Guide Channel as one of their first on-air hosts.

Matenopoulos starred in the claymation show Celebrity Deathmatch as herself.

In 2004, Matenopoulos served as a panel judge on the TBS series He's a Lady.

In January 2004, Good Day Live brought in Matenopoulous (along with Arthel Neville) to co-host the nationally syndicated program. On September 29, 2004, she was hospitalized for an injury that was the result of a stunt she attempted for a segment of Good Day Live. The segment was focused on firefighter training, in which she practiced a fall from a three-story building at a Los Angeles fire station. She landed incorrectly on an airbag and was rushed to the hospital for a possible head injury. It was a closed head wound and she was temporarily blind. Despite massive promotion, including a mall-tour featuring Matenopoulous and Arthel Neville, Good Day Live was canceled by its syndicators in March 2005.

In January 2006, Matenopoulos joined E!'s coverage of the Golden Globe Awards. In April of that same year, she became one of the three hosts on E!'s weeknight celebrity gossip and pop culture series, The Daily 10, a position she held until August 2009. While at E!, Debbie also hosted Fashion Police, Live from the Red Carpet, and the Style Network's Instant Beauty Pageant.

On July 25, 2006, over seven years after her last appearance on The View, she was invited back as a special guest co-host for a day, the first of many subsequent guest appearances she has made on the show over the years.

Matenopoulos has also been a frequent contributor to VH1 specials, including I Love the 90s and I Love Toys. She has also been a guest judge on RuPaul's Drag Race 3.

Debbie's first cookbook, It’s All Greek to Me, was released in the spring 2014. A revised paperback edition was released in 2018.

On July 6, 2015, Matenopoulos was named the co-host of The Insider, a position she held until the show's cancellation on September 9, 2017. Debbie was subsequently named as a Special Correspondent for Entertainment Tonight.

In 2016, while still co-host of The Insider, Matenopoulos became co-host of Home & Family, replacing Cristina Ferrare.

== Personal life ==
On July 5, 2003, Matenopoulos married Jay Faires, the president of Music at Lions Gate Entertainment and founder of Mammoth Records. The pair separated in March 2008, and Faires filed for divorce on November 12, 2008, citing "irreconcilable differences."

Matenopoulos eloped with Jon Falcone in Greece in the summer of 2013. She gave birth to their daughter, Alexandra Kalliope Falcone, on October 29, 2014.

Media offices
New show	The View co-host 1997–1999	Succeeded by Lisa Ling
