= Jason Kennedy (TV personality) =

American entertainment journalist

- Born: Robert Jason Kennedy; December 11, 1981 (age 44); Ft. Lauderdale, Florida, U.S.
- Education: University of Miami
- Occupation: Journalist
- Spouse: Lauren Scruggs (m. 2014)
- Children: 2

Jason Kennedy (born December 11, 1977) is an entertainment journalist. He was the host of E! News and Live from E! and a contributor to the NBC Today Show.

== Biography ==
Kennedy was born in Fort Lauderdale, Florida. As a child, he produced a mock television news program from a home studio. Following his graduation from Westminster Academy, he attended the University of Miami, where he received several awards, including the Associated Press Award for Best News Feature in the state of Florida.

He moved to Los Angeles in 2004 and began anchoring segments for Open Call on the TV Guide Channel. He subsequently joined E! Network. Beginning in May 2008, Kennedy hosted Dance Machine on ABC.

== Personal life ==
Kennedy began dating Lauren Scruggs in 2013. They were married on December 12, 2014, in Dallas, Texas. They have a son who was born April 2022. They welcomed a daughter in October 2023.
