= Selema Masekela =

American actor and singer (born 1971)

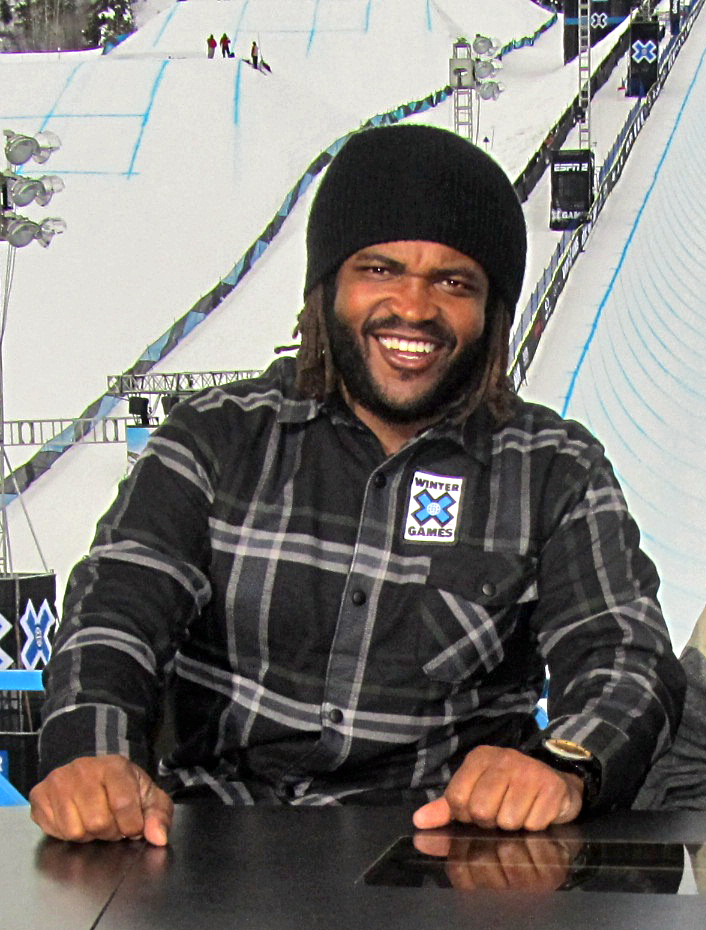
- Selema Masekela in 2011
- Born: Selema Mabena Masekela; August 28, 1971 (age 55); Los Angeles, California, U.S.
- Other name: Sal Masekela
- Occupations: Actor; television host; television commentator
- Years active: 1992–present
- Relatives: Hugh Masekela (father)

Selema Mabena Masekela (born August 28, 1971) is an American television host, sports commentator, actor and singer.

== Life and career ==
Masekela was born in Los Angeles, the son of a Haitian mother and South African jazz musician Hugh Masekela. Masekela is also the older half-brother of Survivor: Cook Islands contestant Nathan Gonzalez. He was raised in St. George, Staten Island, New York, in the same class with rapper Method Man and Carlsbad, California, where he attended Carlsbad High School. Masekela is the co-founder of Berkela Motion Pictures with Jason Bergh. When he was a teenager, Masekela's upbringing brought him to Southern California, where he was first exposed to surfing, snowboarding and skateboarding.

His career began as an intern at Transworld Publications in 1992, home of TW Snow, TW Skateboarding, and TW Surf magazines. He served as an NBA sideline reporter for ESPN during the 2003–2004 season. Masekela was co-host of The Daily 10, a countdown of the day's "top 10" entertainment stories, on the E! network until it was cancelled on September 27, 2010 (last show October 1, 2010). He was also host of both the X Games and Winter X Games on ESPN for 13 years but left in 2012 to work for NBC and NBC Sports Network through a contract with Red Bull Media House. He appears in the "Green" episode of Yo Gabba Gabba singing the song "Hello World" which aired on Nick Jr. on April 22, 2009.

In 2010, he was hired by ESPN to help as a correspondent in its coverage of the 2010 FIFA World Cup in South Africa. While working as a correspondent, Masekela was featured, with his father, Hugh, in a series of videos on ESPN. The series, called "Umlando - Through my Father's Eyes", aired in 10 parts during ESPN's coverage of the FIFA World Cup in South Africa. The series focused on Hugh and Selema's travels through South Africa. Hugh brought his son to the places where he grew up. It was Selema's first trip to his father's homeland.

A native of California, Masekela travelled the world in his youth with his father, South African jazz musician Hugh Masekela. Masekela's own band, Alekesam, shares the name of his first film which chronicles his relationship with his father and their connection through music, which premiered at the Tribeca Film Festival in 2012. “Alekesam” also reads as “Masekela” written backwards. Alekesam's music has been featured on Entourage and House of Lies, with their newest single, "All Is Forgiven", featured on the season four premiere of the Showtime hit. Masekela has hosted live events, including YouTube's Brandcast in New York and Paris, YouTube Live on Stage from the Kennedy Center and Google's Zeitgeist.

As part of NBC's coverage of the 2014 Winter Olympics in Sochi, Masekela was a features reporter for NBC's nationally syndicated Olympic Zone. He joined the Emmy Award-winning investigative series VICE on HBO as a correspondent and executive producer in 2015. That year, he also appeared in the remake of the cult classic Point Break.

From April 2016, Masekela appeared as the host and executive producer of VICELAND’s docu-series, VICE World of Sports. The series took viewers all over the world to explore each location's people, politics and culture through sports. The series premiere at the Tribeca Film Festival on April 22. Masekela is also involved in the production company UX Entertainment. Based in Los Angeles, UXE specializes in film, commercials, music videos, and animation work.

In December 2022, Masekela announced his relationship with Academy Award winner Lupita Nyong'o. They broke up in October 2023.

== Social initiatives ==
Masekela is involved in several social initiatives, and is the co-founder of Stoked Mentoring, an organization dedicated to mentoring at risk youth through action sports. He also serves on the advisory boards of The Lunchbox Fund, a non-profit organization which provides a daily meal to students of township schools in Soweto of South Africa, and The Skatepark Project, an organization dedicated to financing and building high-quality, legal skateboarding parks for kids. Masekela is also a strong public supporter of the Surfrider Foundation and Life Rolls On.
