= 2022 MTV Movie & TV Awards =

American awards show

- Date: June 5, 2022
- Location: Barker Hangar, Santa Monica, California
- Country: United States
- Hosted by: Vanessa Hudgens (Scripted); Tayshia Adams (Unscripted)

Highlights
- Most awards: Euphoria (4)
- Most nominations: Spider-Man: No Way Home (7); Euphoria (7)
- Website: mtv.com/movie-and-tv-awards

Television/radio coverage
- Network: MTV, with simulcast on The CW and across other Paramount Media Networks channels.
- Produced by: Bruce Gillmer; Den of Thieves
- Directed by: Joe DeMaio

The 2022 MTV Movie & TV Awards were an awards presentation that was held on June 5, 2022 at the Barker Hangar in Santa Monica, California. It was the 30th edition of the MTV Movie & TV Awards and the fifth to jointly honor movies and television.

It also was the last Movie & TV Awards ceremony to be broadcast on The CW.

The ceremony was hosted by Vanessa Hudgens and Tayshia Adams, with Hudgens hosting the first half of the ceremony for film and scripted television series, and Adams hosting the second half of the ceremony—MTV Movie & TV Awards: Unscripted—for awards in reality television. Unlike 2021, the two segments were held back-to-back on one night. The ceremony was televised by MTV, with a simulcast on The CW and various Paramount Media Networks cable channels.

== Winners and nominees ==
The full list of nominees was announced on May 11, 2022. Best Musical Moment nominees were announced on May 26, 2022. Winners are listed first, in bold.

=== Scripted Awards ===
Best Movie	Best Show
**Spider-Man: No Way Home**; The Adam Project; Dune; The Batman; Scream; Shang-Chi and the Legend of the Ten Rings	**Euphoria**; Inventing Anna; Loki; Squid Game; Ted Lasso; Yellowstone
Best Performance in a Movie	Best Performance in a Show
**Tom Holland – Spider-Man: No Way Home**; Sandra Bullock – The Lost City; Timothée Chalamet – Dune; Lady Gaga – House of Gucci; Robert Pattinson – The Batman	**Zendaya – Euphoria**; Lily James – Pam & Tommy; Kelly Reilly – Yellowstone; Amanda Seyfried – The Dropout; Sydney Sweeney – Euphoria
Best Comedic Performance	Best Hero
**Ryan Reynolds – Free Guy**; John Cena – Peacemaker; Brett Goldstein – Ted Lasso; Johnny Knoxville – Jackass Forever; Megan Stalter – Hacks	**Scarlett Johansson – Black Widow**; Daniel Craig – No Time to Die; Tom Holland – Spider-Man: No Way Home; Oscar Isaac – Moon Knight; Simu Liu – Shang-Chi and the Legend of the Ten Rings
Best Villain	Best Kiss
**Daniel Radcliffe – The Lost City**; James Jude Courtney – Halloween Kills; Willem Dafoe – Spider-Man: No Way Home; Colin Farrell – The Batman; Victoria Pedretti – You	**Poopies and the snake – Jackass Forever**; Lily Collins and Lucien Laviscount – Emily in Paris; Tom Holland and Zendaya – Spider-Man: No Way Home; Robert Pattinson and Zoë Kravitz – The Batman; Hunter Schafer and Dominic Fike – Euphoria
Most Frightened Performance	Best Fight
**Jenna Ortega - Scream**; Mia Goth – X; Kyle Richards – Halloween Kills; Millicent Simmonds – A Quiet Place Part II; Sadie Sink – Fear Street: Part Two 1978	**Cassie vs. Maddy – Euphoria**; Black Widow vs. Widows – Black Widow; Guy vs. Dude – Free Guy; Shang-Chi vs. Razor Fist – Shang-Chi and the Legend of the Ten Rings; Spider-Men vs. Multiverse Villains – Spider-Man: No Way Home
Best Breakthrough Performance	Best Team
**Sophia Di Martino – Loki**; Ariana DeBose – West Side Story; Hannah Einbinder – Hacks; Alana Haim – Licorice Pizza; Jung Ho-yeon – Squid Game	**Tom Hiddleston, Sophia Di Martino, Owen Wilson - Loki**; Sandra Bullock, Channing Tatum, Brad Pitt - The Lost City; Selena Gomez, Steve Martin, Martin Short - Only Murders in the Building; Tom Holland, Andrew Garfield, Tobey Maguire - Spider-Man: No Way Home; Ryan Reynolds, Walker Scobell - The Adam Project
Here For The Hookup	Best Song
**Euphoria**; Never Have I Ever; Pam & Tommy; Sex/Life; Sex Lives of College Girls	**"On My Way (Marry Me)" – Jennifer Lopez (Marry Me)**; "Elliot's Song" – Dominic Fike (Euphoria); "Here I Am (Singing My Way Home)" – Jennifer Hudson (Respect); "Just Look Up" – Ariana Grande and Kid Cudi (Don't Look Up); "We Don't Talk About Bruno" – Encanto Cast (Encanto)
Best Musical Moment
**"Dance With Me" - Heartstopper**; "America" - West Side Story; "Disco Forever" - House of Gucci; "Downtown" - Anya Taylor-Joy (Last Night in Soho); "Do Ya Wanna Taste It" - Wig Wam (Peacemaker); "Dynamite" - BTS performed by Ashley Park (Emily in Paris); "Holding Out For a Hero" - Euphoria; "The Moment of Truth" - Carrie Underwood (Cobra Kai); "Million To One" - Camila Cabello (Cinderella); "Nobody Like U" - 4*TOWN (Turning Red); "Original Score" - Halo; "The Rose Song" - Olivia Rodrigo (High School Musical: The Musical: The Series); "Therapy" - Andrew Garfield and Vanessa Hudgens (Tick, Tick... Boom!); "This Is How We Do It" - Montell Jordan (Yellowjackets); "We Don't Talk About Bruno" – Encanto Cast (Encanto); "Wrecking Ball" - Midnite String Quartet (Bridgerton)

=== Unscripted Awards ===
Best Music Documentary	Best Docu-Reality Show
**Olivia Rodrigo: Driving Home 2 U**; The Beatles: Get Back; Janet Jackson; Jeen-Yuhs; Oasis Knebworth 1996	**Selling Sunset**; Jersey Shore: Family Vacation; Love & Hip Hop: Atlanta; Summer House; The Real Housewives of Beverly Hills
Best Reality Star	Best Reality Romance
**Chrishell Stause - Selling Sunset**; Lindsay Hubbard - Summer House; Teresa Giudice - The Real Housewives of New Jersey; Willow Pill - RuPaul's Drag Race season 14; Chris "CT" Tamburello - The Challenge	**Loren and Alexei Brovarnik - Loren & Alexei: After the 90 Days**; Joe Amabile and Serena Pitt - Bachelor in Paradise; Nany Gonzalez and Kaycee Clark - The Challenge: Spies, Lies & Allies; Tom Sandoval and Ariana Madix - Vanderpump Rules; Yandy and Mendeecees - Love & Hip Hop: Atlanta
Best Competition Series	Best Lifestyle Show
**RuPaul's Drag Race**; American Idol; Dancing with the Stars; The Challenge: Spies, Lies & Allies; The Masked Singer	**Selena + Chef**; Bar Rescue; Dr. Pimple Popper; Making It; Queer Eye
Best New Unscripted Series	Best Talk/Topical Show
**The D'Amelio Show**; Hart to Heart; Teen Mom: Family Reunion; The Real Housewives Ultimate Girls Trip; Queen of the Universe	**The Tonight Show Starring Jimmy Fallon**; The Daily Show with Trevor Noah; The Drew Barrymore Show; The Kelly Clarkson Show; The Late Show with Stephen Colbert
Best Host	Breakthrough Social Star
**Kelly Clarkson – The Kelly Clarkson Show**; Charlamagne Tha God – Tha God's Honest Truth; Gordon Ramsay – MasterChef; Rob Dyrdek – Ridiculousness; RuPaul – RuPaul's Drag Race	**Bella Poarch**; Benito Skinner; Caleb Hearon; Khaby Lame; Megan Stalter
Best Fight	Best Reality Return
**"Bosco vs. Lady Camden" – RuPaul's Drag Race**; "Candiace Dillard Bassett vs. Mia Thornton – Salad toss fight" – The Real Housewives of Potomac; "Margaret Josephs vs. Teresa Giudice" – The Real Housewives of New Jersey; "Danielle Olivera vs. Ciara Miller vs. Lindsay Hubbard" – Summer House; "Christine Quinn vs. Chrishell Stause" – Selling Sunset	**Paris Hilton - Cooking with Paris and Paris in Love**; Bethenny Frankel - The Big Shot with Bethenny; Kylie Sonique Love - RuPaul's Drag Race All Stars; Tami Roman - The Real World Homecoming: Los Angeles; Sher - Ex on the Beach

=== Comedic Genius Award ===
- Jack Black

=== MTV Generation Award ===
- Jennifer Lopez

=== MTV Reality Royalty Lifetime Achievement ===
- Bethenny Frankel

== Multiple nominations ==
=== Film ===
The following movies received multiple nominations:

- Seven - Spider-Man: No Way Home
- Four - The Batman
- Three - The Lost City, Shang-Chi and the Legend of the Ten Rings
- Two - The Adam Project, Black Widow, Dune, Encanto, Free Guy, Halloween Kills, House of Gucci, Jackass Forever, Scream, West Side Story

=== Television ===
The following television series received multiple nominations:

- Seven - Euphoria
- Three - Loki, Selling Sunset, Summer House
- Two - Emily in Paris, Hacks, The Kelly Clarkson Show, Love & Hip Hop: Atlanta, Pam & Tommy, Peacemaker, The Real Housewives of New Jersey, Squid Game, Ted Lasso, Yellowstone

== Appearances and Presenters ==
=== Scripted ===
- Jamie Campbell Bower, Eduardo Franco and Joseph Quinn - presented Best Breakthrough Performance
- Jenna Ortega - presented Best Music Documentary
- Pablo Schreiber - presented Best Villain
- Awkwafina - presented Comedic Genius Award
- Sydney Sweeney - presented Best Song
- Glen Powell and Jay Ellis - presented Best Fight
- Riley Keough - introduced Diplo and Swae Lee
- David Spade and Sarah Shahi - presented Best Kiss
- Lana Condor - presented Best Team
- Vanessa Hudgens - presented MTV Generation Award
- Chris Evans - presented Best Movie
- Hannah Einbinder and Megan Stalter - presented Most Frightened Performance
- Billy Eichner - presented Best Comedic Performance
- Sofia Carson - presented Best Musical Moment
- Maria Bakalova, Rachel Sennott and Chase Sui Wonders - presented Best Show

=== Unscripted ===
- Garcelle Beauvais, Kathy Hilton, Erika Jayne, Dorit Kemsley, Crystal Kung Minkoff, Kyle Richards, Lisa Rinna, Sutton Stracke, and Sheree Zampino - presented Best Reality Return
- Chris Tamburello - introduced The Challenge: Untold History
- Nick Viall and Tami Roman - presented Best Unscripted Series
- Ariana Madix, James Kennedy, and Tom Sandoval - presented Best Fight
- Taylor Armstrong, Tamra Judge, and Dorinda Medley - introduced The Real Housewives Ultimate Girls Trip: Ex-Wives Club
- Paris Hilton - presented MTV Reality Royalty Lifetime Achievement
- Chrishell Stause and Emma Hernan - introduced Selling The OC
- Paige DeSorbo and Lindsay Hubbard - presented Best Talk/Topical Show
- Teresa Giudice and Melissa Gorga - presented Best Competition Series
- Kristin Cavallari - presented Best Reality Star
- Kevin Kreider and Kim Lee - presented Best Reality Romance
- Angelina Pivarnick - introduced All Star Shore
- Nicole Richie and Jeremy Scott - presented Best Docu/Reality Show
