= The Real Housewives of Beverly Hills season 14 =

The Real Housewives of Beverly Hills
- Season 14
- Promotional poster via Peacock
- Starring: Kyle Richards; Erika Jayne; Dorit Kemsley; Garcelle Beauvais; Sutton Stracke; Bozoma Saint John
- No. of episodes: 20

Release
- Original network: Bravo
- Original release: November 19, 2024 – April 15, 2025

Season chronology
- ← Previous; Season 13 Next → Season 15

The fourteenth season of The Real Housewives of Beverly Hills, an American reality television series, aired on Bravo from November 19, 2024, to April 15, 2025, and was primarily filmed in Beverly Hills, California.

The season focuses on the personal and professional lives of Kyle Richards, Erika Girardi, Dorit Kemsley, Garcelle Beauvais, Sutton Stracke and Bozoma Saint John, with Kathy Hilton and Jennifer Tilly appearing as friends of the housewives.

The season's executive producers are Alex Baskin, Darren Ward, Maryam Jahanbin, Lucilla D'Agostino, Jen McClure, Joseph Ferraro, and Andy Cohen. Following the conclusion of the season, Beauvais announced her departure from the franchise.

== Cast ==
In March 2024, Annemarie Wiley announced her departure from the series. In April 2024, Crystal Kung Minkoff announced her departure. In May 2024, it was announced that Kyle Richards, Erika Girardi, Dorit Kemsley, Garcelle Beauvais and Sutton Stracke would be returning for the fourteenth season alongside new housewife Bozoma Saint John and friends of the housewives Kathy Hilton and Jennifer Tilly. Camille Grammer and Faye Resnick also made guest appearances during the season.

== Production ==
Filming for the fourteenth season began in May 2024 and concluded in August 2024. The Real Housewives of Beverly Hills is produced by Evolution Media and 32 Flavors for Bravo. Alex Baskin, Darren Ward, Maryam Jahanbin, Lucilla D'Agostino, Jen McClure, and Joseph Ferraro and Andy Cohen are recognized as the series' executive producers.

== Episodes ==
The Real Housewives of Beverly Hills season 14 episodes
No. overall	No. in season	Title	Original release date	US viewers (millions)
289	1	"Grace Time Is Over"	November 19, 2024	0.80
290	2	"A Sobering Separation"	November 26, 2024	0.71
291	3	"Life's a Beach"	December 3, 2024	0.71
292	4	"Twisted Sisterhood"	December 10, 2024	0.78
293	5	"High Horses and Low Blows"	December 17, 2024	0.81
294	6	"Venom in the Viper Room"	January 7, 2025	0.91
295	7	"What the Chuck?"	January 14, 2025	0.83
296	8	"A Perfect Storm Out"	January 21, 2025	0.84
297	9	"Beachy Keen"	January 28, 2025	0.87
298	10	"Sweet Home Augusta"	February 4, 2025	0.77
299	11	"Mind Your Business"	February 11, 2025	0.74
300	12	"Land of the Free, Home of the Shade"	February 18, 2025	0.78
301	13	"Caviar Catastrophe"	February 25, 2025	0.85
302	14	"Hemlines and Headlines"	March 4, 2025	0.80
303	15	"Trouble in Paradise"	March 11, 2025	0.83
304	16	"Sutton on Trial at Sea"	March 18, 2025	0.80
305	17	"A Caribbean Send Off"	March 25, 2025	0.90
306	18	"Reunion Part 1"	April 1, 2025	0.97
307	19	"Reunion Part 2"	April 8, 2025	0.82
308	20	"Reunion Part 3"	April 15, 2025	0.91
