= The Real Housewives of Beverly Hills season 15 =

The Real Housewives of Beverly Hills
- Season 15
- Promotional poster via Peacock
- Starring: Kyle Richards; Erika Jayne; Dorit Kemsley; Sutton Stracke; Bozoma Saint John; Amanda Frances; Rachel Zoe
- No. of episodes: 21

Release
- Original network: Bravo
- Original release: December 4, 2025 – May 7, 2026

Season chronology
- ← Previous; Season 14

The fifteenth season of The Real Housewives of Beverly Hills, an American reality television series, aired on Bravo from December 4, 2025, to May 7, 2026, and was primarily filmed in Beverly Hills, California.

The season focuses on the personal and professional lives of Kyle Richards, Erika Girardi, Dorit Kemsley, Sutton Stracke, Bozoma Saint John, Amanda Frances and Rachel Zoe, with Kathy Hilton, Jennifer Tilly and Natalie Swanston Fuller appearing as friends of the housewives.

The season's executive producers are Alex Baskin, Jenn Levy, Joe Kingsley, Chris Cullen, Maryam Jahanbin, Brian McCarthy, Barry Poznick and Andy Cohen. Following the conclusion of the season, Frances announced her departure from the franchise.

== Cast and synopsis ==
=== Cast ===
In March 2025, Garcelle Beauvais announced her departure from the series after appearing as a housewife for five seasons. In June 2025, it was announced that Rachel Zoe would be joining the series as a housewife for the fifteenth season. In November 2025, it was announced that the fifteenth season would premiere on December 4, 2025. Kyle Richards, Erika Girardi, Dorit Kemsley, Sutton Stracke and Bozoma Saint John all returned alongside new housewives Amanda Frances and Zoe. Kathy Hilton and Jennifer Tilly also returned as "friends of the housewives" alongside new "friend" Natalie Swanston Fuller.

=== Synopsis ===
The season introduces Frances, an author and online business coach, and fashion stylist Zoe as new full-time cast members. Swanston Fuller joins as a friend of the housewives.

A major storyline involves Frances' past involvement with a group she has described as a cult. At the same time, Saint John questions the legitimacy of Frances' coaching business on air.

== Production ==
Filming for the fifteenth season began in June 2025 and concluded in September 2025. The Real Housewives of Beverly Hills is produced by 32 Flavors and Evolution Media for Bravo. Alex Baskin, Jenn Levy, Joe Kingsley, Chris Cullen, Maryam Jahanbin, Brian McCarthy, Barry Poznick and Andy Cohen are recognized as the series' executive producers.

== Episodes ==
The Real Housewives of Beverly Hills season 15 episodes
No. overall	No. in season	Title	Original release date	US viewers (millions)
309	1	"Hot Girl Summer"	December 4, 2025	0.62
310	2	"Bearing It All"	December 11, 2025	0.64
311	3	"A Match Made in Beverly Hills"	December 18, 2025	0.60
312	4	"A Housewives Heatwave"	January 8, 2026	0.58
313	5	"Not Feeling the Healing"	January 15, 2026	0.58
314	6	"Star Signs and Bad Times"	January 22, 2026	0.65
315	7	"Headlines and Heartbreak"	January 29, 2026	0.73
316	8	"Do You Remember?!?"	February 5, 2026	0.81
317	9	"Vacation and Manifestation"	February 12, 2026	0.78
318	10	"The Cult's Out of the Bag"	February 19, 2026	0.82
319	11	"The Price of Divorce"	February 26, 2026	0.67
320	12	"Arrivederci Beverly Hills"	March 5, 2026	0.68
321	13	"Read the Room"	March 12, 2026	0.74
322	14	"Unmasking the Truth"	March 19, 2026	0.79
323	15	"Stranded Under the Tuscan Sun"	March 26, 2026	0.78
324	16	"The Last Supper"	April 2, 2026	0.77
325	17	"Drama on the Dance Floor"	April 9, 2026	0.77
326	18	"Closing Chapters"	April 16, 2026	0.75
327	19	"Reunion Part 1"	April 23, 2026	0.82
328	20	"Reunion Part 2"	April 30, 2026	0.81
329	21	"Reunion Part 3"	May 7, 2026	0.78
