= The Real Housewives of Beverly Hills season 12 =

The Real Housewives of Beverly Hills
- Season 12
- Cover used by the iTunes Store; Left to right: Jenkins, Minkoff, Girardi, Richards, Beauvais, Kemsley, Rinna and Stracke
- Starring: Kyle Richards; Lisa Rinna; Erika Girardi; Dorit Kemsley; Garcelle Beauvais; Crystal Kung Minkoff; Sutton Stracke; Diana Jenkins
- No. of episodes: 24

Release
- Original network: Bravo
- Original release: May 11 – October 26, 2022

Season chronology
- ← Previous; Season 11 Next → Season 13

The twelfth season of The Real Housewives of Beverly Hills, an American reality television series, aired on Bravo from May 11, 2022 to October 26, 2022, and is primarily filmed in Beverly Hills, California.

The season focuses on the personal and professional lives of Kyle Richards, Lisa Rinna, Erika Jayne, Dorit Kemsley, Garcelle Beauvais, Crystal Kung Minkoff, Sutton Stracke and Diana Jenkins. The season consisted of 24 episodes.

The season's executive producers are Andrew Hoegl, Barrie Bernstein, Lisa Shannon, Pam Healy and Andy Cohen.

The season marked the exits of Rinna and Jenkins.

== Cast ==
In December 2021, it was confirmed that the entire cast of the eleventh season would return for the twelfth season, and that joining them would be new housewife Diana Jenkins and new friend of the housewives Sheree Zampino.

== Episodes ==
The Real Housewives of Beverly Hills season 12 episodes
No. overall	No. in season	Title	Original release date	U.S. viewers (millions)
245	1	"The Break-In"	May 11, 2022	1.15
246	2	"Receipt Offender"	May 18, 2022	0.94
247	3	"There's Sutton About Crystal"	May 25, 2022	0.99
248	4	"The Crystal Conundrum"	June 1, 2022	1.18
249	5	"In Hot Water"	June 8, 2022	1.15
250	6	"High Cries and Misty Demeanors"	June 15, 2022	1.16
251	7	"Ship-Faced"	June 22, 2022	1.18
252	8	"It Takes a Villain"	June 29, 2022	1.04
253	9	"Calamity Jayne"	July 6, 2022	1.14
254	10	"So You Say"	July 13, 2022	1.21
255	11	"The Weight of Words"	July 20, 2022	1.05
256	12	"Beverly Hills Blackout"	July 27, 2022	1.14
257	13	"Rosé Colored Glasses"	August 3, 2022	1.18
258	14	"Shameless Not Ruthless"	August 10, 2022	1.16
259	15	"Disco Inferno"	August 17, 2022	1.05
260	16	"Altitude Adjustment"	August 31, 2022	1.08
261	17	"The Girl with the Diamond Earrings"	September 7, 2022	1.22
262	18	"Rocky Mountain Bye"	September 14, 2022	1.17
263	19	"We Need to Talk About Kathy"	September 21, 2022	1.12
264	20	"Silence Is Golden"	September 28, 2022	1.12
265	21	"Not My Sister's Keeper"	October 5, 2022	1.20
266	22	"Reunion Part 1"	October 12, 2022	1.43
267	23	"Reunion Part 2"	October 19, 2022	1.40
268	24	"Reunion Part 3"	October 26, 2022	1.45
