= The Real Housewives of Beverly Hills season 11 =

The Real Housewives of Beverly Hills
- Season 11
- Cover used by the iTunes Store; Left to right: Girardi, Beauvais, Minkoff, Richards, Rinna, Stracke and Kemsley
- Starring: Kyle Richards; Lisa Rinna; Erika Girardi; Dorit Kemsley; Garcelle Beauvais; Crystal Kung Minkoff; Sutton Stracke
- No. of episodes: 24

Release
- Original network: Bravo
- Original release: May 19 – November 3, 2021

Season chronology
- ← Previous; Season 10 Next → Season 12

The eleventh season of The Real Housewives of Beverly Hills, an American reality television series, aired on Bravo from May 19, 2021 to November 3, 2021, and is primarily filmed in Beverly Hills, California.

The season focuses on the personal and professional lives of Kyle Richards, Lisa Rinna, Erika Girardi, Dorit Kemsley, Garcelle Beauvais, Crystal Kung Minkoff and Sutton Stracke. The season consists of 24 episodes.

The season's executive producers are Andrew Hoegl, Barrie Bernstein, Lisa Shannon, Pam Healy and Andy Cohen.

== Production and crew ==
Alex Baskin, Chris Cullen, Douglas Ross, Greg Stewart, Toni Gallagher, Dave Rupel and Andy Cohen are recognized as the series' executive producers; it is produced and distributed by Evolution Media. Filming began in October 2020 and ended in February 2021.

In November 2020, production on the series halted after crew members tested positive for COVID-19. In December 2020, it was announced production would remain halted after Kyle Richards, Dorit Kemsley and Kathy Hilton had tested positive. Production on the series later resumed after 14-day quarantines and negative tests.

The reunion was filmed on September 10, 2021.

== Cast ==
In September 2020, Denise Richards and Teddi Mellencamp Arroyave announced they would not be returning for the eleventh season. A month later in October 2020, it was announced that Kung Minkoff would be joining the show as a housewife. On April 6, 2021, it was announced that Sutton Stracke would be joining the main cast after previously being featured as a friend of the housewives. Hilton joined as a "friend of the housewives."

== Episodes ==
The Real Housewives of Beverly Hills season 11 episodes
No. overall	No. in season	Title	Original release date	U.S. viewers (millions)
221	1	"Dressed to the 90210s"	May 19, 2021	0.95
The Real Housewives of Beverly Hills Season 11, Episode 1, "Dressed to the 90210s," kicks off with Kyle recovering from a nose job and Dorit hosting a glamorous backyard barbecue. Lisa Rinna and Garcelle try to mend their friendship, while Erika Jayne subtly hints at trouble in her marriage. Newcomer Crystal Kung Minkoff joins the group, but tension quickly arises when Sutton Stracke dismisses a discussion about race. The episode sets up major conflicts, including Erika’s legal drama and shifting friendships.
222	2	"Two Truths and a Lie"	May 26, 2021	0.90
The women take a trip to Lake Tahoe, where tensions start to rise. Sutton Stracke and Crystal Kung Minkoff continue their awkward interactions, leading to growing friction. Erika Jayne remains tight-lipped about her personal life, but the group starts sensing something is off. Meanwhile, Kyle Richards and Garcelle Beauvais address their lingering issues from last season. The episode builds on shifting friendships and sets the stage for deeper drama to unfold.
223	3	"Sutton's Gotta Give"	June 2, 2021	1.07
Tensions escalate during the Lake Tahoe trip. Sutton Stracke and Crystal Kung Minkoff’s conflict worsens after an emotional late-night argument. Meanwhile, Erika Jayne remains guarded about her marriage, hinting at deeper issues. Garcelle Beauvais continues to call out Kyle Richards for past tensions, while the group enjoys outdoor activities and tries to have fun despite the growing drama. The episode deepens the season’s conflicts, especially between Sutton and Crystal.
224	4	"Overexposed"	June 9, 2021	1.09
The Lake Tahoe trip continues with rising tensions. Crystal Kung Minkoff feels uncomfortable after Sutton Stracke walks into her room unannounced, leading to more friction between them. Erika Jayne finally opens up to the group, revealing that she is divorcing Tom Girardi, shocking the ladies. Meanwhile, Garcelle Beauvais struggles to fully trust Lisa Rinna after their past issues. The episode heightens drama, especially around Erika’s unfolding personal struggles.
225	5	"The Divided States Of Erika"	June 16, 2021	1.08
Erika Jayne’s divorce becomes the main topic of conversation, with the ladies questioning the timing and circumstances. Sutton Stracke and Crystal Kung Minkoff’s feud intensifies as Crystal feels dismissed and disrespected. Meanwhile, Garcelle Beauvais continues to struggle with trusting Lisa Rinna. As Erika shares more details about her split from Tom Girardi, the group becomes divided on whether she’s telling the whole truth. The episode sets the stage for growing suspicion and drama surrounding Erika’s legal troubles.
226	6	"The Liberation Of Erika Jayne"	June 23, 2021	1.18
Erika Jayne opens up about her divorce, sharing emotional details about her split from Tom Girardi. The ladies react with a mix of support and skepticism as more questions arise about the legal scandal surrounding Tom. Meanwhile, Sutton Stracke and Crystal Kung Minkoff try to move past their ongoing feud, but tensions still linger. The group enjoys a glamorous dinner, but Erika’s revelations dominate the conversation, setting the stage for even more drama to unfold.
227	7	"Defining Women"	June 30, 2021	1.10
Erika Jayne continues to share more details about her divorce, but some of the ladies start questioning her story. Sutton Stracke becomes increasingly skeptical and expresses concerns about being associated with Erika’s legal troubles. Meanwhile, Kyle Richards hosts a luxurious holiday dinner, where tensions simmer beneath the surface. Crystal Kung Minkoff and Sutton attempt to move forward, but lingering resentment remains. The episode highlights growing doubts and shifting alliances within the group.
228	8	"The Good, The Bad and The Ugly Leather Pants"	July 7, 2021	1.17
Tensions reach a boiling point between Sutton Stracke and Crystal Kung Minkoff during a heated argument, with Sutton famously mocking Crystal’s leather pants. Meanwhile, Erika Jayne continues to share shocking details about her marriage and legal troubles, leaving the women with mixed feelings. Garcelle Beauvais questions her friendships within the group, while Lisa Rinna tries to play peacemaker. The episode is filled with drama, shifting dynamics, and one of the season’s most memorable confrontations.
229	9	"A Pretty Meltdown"	July 14, 2021	1.07
Emotions run high as Sutton Stracke breaks down over the growing tension between her and the group, particularly regarding Erika Jayne’s legal troubles. Erika continues to reveal more shocking details about her situation, leaving the women unsure of what to believe. Meanwhile, Garcelle Beauvais struggles to feel fully included, and Lisa Rinna tries to smooth things over. The drama intensifies as trust and loyalty within the group are tested.
230	10	"Affairs and Accidents"	July 21, 2021	1.17
231	11	"Ice Queen of the Desert"	August 4, 2021	1.12
232	12	"Circle of Distrust"	August 11, 2021	1.13
233	13	"Season's Grillings"	August 18, 2021	1.18
234	14	"Lips Unsealed"	August 25, 2021	1.28
235	15	"The Dinner Party From Hell: Part Two"	September 1, 2021	1.22
236	16	"Threats and Promises"	September 8, 2021	1.29
237	17	"A Tale of Two Accidents"	September 15, 2021	1.25
238	18	"Del Mar by the Shade"	September 22, 2021	1.18
239	19	"Over-Poured and Over-Board"	September 29, 2021	1.16
240	20	"New Year, Old Grudges"	October 6, 2021	1.26
241	21	"Reunion Part 1"	October 13, 2021	1.52
242	22	"Reunion Part 2"	October 20, 2021	1.47
243	23	"Reunion Part 3"	October 27, 2021	1.39
244	24	"Reunion Part 4"	November 3, 2021	1.32
