= The Real Housewives of Beverly Hills season 13 =

The Real Housewives of Beverly Hills
- Season 13
- Promotional poster via Peacock
- Starring: Kyle Richards; Erika Girardi; Dorit Kemsley; Garcelle Beauvais; Crystal Kung Minkoff; Sutton Stracke; Annemarie Wiley
- No. of episodes: 20

Release
- Original network: Bravo
- Original release: October 25, 2023 – March 13, 2024

Season chronology
- ← Previous; Season 12 Next → Season 14

The thirteenth season of The Real Housewives of Beverly Hills, an American reality television series, aired on Bravo from October 25, 2023, to March 13, 2024, and was primarily filmed in Beverly Hills, California.

The season focuses on the personal and professional lives of Kyle Richards, Erika Girardi, Dorit Kemsley, Garcelle Beauvais, Crystal Kung Minkoff, Sutton Stracke and Annemarie Wiley.

The season's executive producers are Alex Baskin, Darren Ward, Maryam Jahanbin, Joe Kingsley, Brian McCarthy and Andy Cohen.

This season marked the exit of Kung Minkoff and the only appearance for Wiley.

== Cast and synopsis ==
=== Cast ===
In January 2023, it was confirmed that Lisa Rinna would not return after eight seasons on the show, along with newcomer Diana Jenkins who announced her own exit from the series after one season.

In October 2023, it was confirmed that all six remaining housewives would return along with new housewife Annemarie Wiley.

=== Synopsis ===
The season centers on Kyle Richards' separation from her husband, real estate executive Mauricio Umansky, after 27 years of marriage. Richards and Umansky announced their separation in July 2023. The cast and public speculate about the nature of Richards' close friendship with country singer Morgan Wade.

Annemarie Wiley joins the cast as a new full-time housewife. Dorit Kemsley begins to publicly acknowledge deeper marital difficulties with her husband Paul "PK" Kemsley.

Crystal Kung Minkoff departs the franchise following the season, as does Wiley after a single season.

== Episodes ==
The Real Housewives of Beverly Hills season 13 episodes
No. overall	No. in season	Title	Original release date	US viewers (millions)
269	1	"The Eaglewoman Has Landed"	October 25, 2023	1.02
The ladies reunite together to discuss certain issues they've had. Erika is trying to rebond with the girls but Dorit has an issue with a comment Erika made while Kyle is upset no one had her back with her sister Kathy. Kyle's home life is starting to be altered while Garcelle is trying to figure out her relationship with her sons.
270	2	"An Unwise Surprise"	November 1, 2023	0.88
Kyle helps PK form a surprise for Dorit only for it to not go too well for them. Sutton meets with a matchmaker to find the perfect man. Erika and Dorit make-up. Kyle and Mauricio get into a small argument during Portia's birthday dinner after Kyle reveals that Mauricio has a tattoo.
271	3	"It's Not About the Pants"	November 8, 2023	0.96
The ladies start their Las Vegas trip for Crystal's 40th birthday bash. The ladies have an intervention for Sutton not being able to get a second date. As the ladies head to Magic Mike, Sutton has a surprising reaction during the show leading to a big blow up and an argument between her and Kyle. The ladies want to know what's going on with her sons and later Garcelle mentions she is not comfortable talking about them in the group after what happened last year making Dorit upset.
272	4	"Hellevator"	November 15, 2023	1.02
After getting over the breakdown during Magic Mike, one of the dancers, who Erika knows, appears in the elevator, leading Sutton to apologize for ruining the evening and leading to a confrontation between Sutton and Erika. Erika proceeds to say Sutton thought the show was awful and Sutton denies saying it. The fight continues in the sprinter van until the ladies get to the airport. Garcelle and Erika meet for lunch and Garcelle tries to get advice on how to understand Dorit better. Kyle visits Sutton at her house where the two end up serving low blows to each other, Kyle saying Sutton loses her temper easy and Sutton telling her to name it.
273	5	"Sutton-ly Suspicious"	November 22, 2023	0.81
The name it conversation continues leading Kyle to leave Sutton's house immediately after something about Kyle's marriage comes up. Erika has her mom over and it only annoys her a bit, but they have to talk about something dark from her past. Crystal talks about her control issues with her brother while Garcelle has a movie screening for her latest role. As the night celebrates her, conflict with Garcelle and Dorit as well as Kyle and Sutton continues on. Denise appears to celebrate Garcelle.
274	6	"Ring Around the Rumor"	November 29, 2023	1.01
Kyle and Dorit through around a huge accusation about Sutton which Crystal thinks is out of line. Erika is getting her career back in order and Garcelle is surprised about something her son knew about her divorce. Kyle gets another tattoo with Morgan and later throws a party where Sutton and Kyle get into it. Annemarie is introduced while Camille and Faye meet for the first time in a while and don't want to be near and everyone is surprised to have them in the same room.
275	7	"Dazed and Accused"	December 6, 2023	1.01
As the dinner continues, Sutton and Kyle continue to land blows with each other. Kyle brings up Sutton's eating and her esophagus disorder while Sutton brings up the topic of Kathy. Garcelle says she noticed Kyle's band is different and Kyle lets them know where her marriage stands. Denise is upset with Erika and the ladies are trying to figure out why as Denise cannot get her point out. Denise later has a brunch with Garcelle, Sutton and Crystal and explains why she is upset with Erika.
276	8	"Esopha-Gate"	December 13, 2023	1.01
Kyle struggles to deal with everything going on in her life from her marriage, the drama with Kathy and losing a good friend of hers. At Sutton's store, Kyle brings Kim around and things between Sutton and Kyle are awkward. Dorit confronts Crystal about something Dorit said about Sutton and Crystal doesn't give it much attention. Newbie Annemarie questions Sutton about her esophagus.
277	9	"A Feisty Fiesta"	December 20, 2023	0.96
Sutton goes on her first date, after meeting with a matchmaker. Garcelle, Sutton and Erika go out for drinks together. Crystal hosts a Taco Tuesday where tensions flare up with Dorit mainly being in the hotseat. Garcelle and Dorit exchange low blows and things with Denise and Erika take a turn.
278	10	"Re-Lentless Erika"	January 3, 2024	1.11
Erika and Denise continue to feud at Crystal's Taco Tuesday. Sutton goes on another date with a guy named Sam and finally breaks her 1 date curse. Kyle and Kim have a heart to heart and discuss Kyle's issue with Kathy and Kim thinks they should make-up.
279	11	"A Celebration of Life"	January 10, 2024	1.10
The ladies travel for Annemarie's birthday and play some silly games with each other. Garcelle has difficulties with her sons while Dorit and PK are trying to work through Dorit's PTSD with a therapist. Kyle has a celebration of life party dedicated to one of her dearest friends who sadly passed. The ladies noticed that Mauricio isn't around making it seem Kyle's over her marriage. Kyle gives a loving speech ending with Morgan performing. As this was going on, Annemarie has a discussion with Garcelle and Crystal about Sutton and her esophagus that leads to an accusation that triggers Crystal.
280	12	"Bitter Pill to Swallow"	January 17, 2024	1.09
Crystal has lunch with her brother while Kyle and Sutton hang out together at Sutton's house. Dorit is hosting an event for her charity Homeless Not Toothless. It marks the first time in a while that Kyle and Mauricio are out and about together after all the headlines. After hearing about Annemarie talking about her esophagus again, Sutton confronts her about the issue and Crystal gets heated after Annemarie lies about something she actually said causing Crystal to react a certain way. As the ladies are packing for their trip, Annemarie apologizes to Sutton over the phone.
281	13	"Tapas and Tattletales"	January 24, 2024	1.17
282	14	"Aches and Spains"	January 31, 2024	1.11
283	15	"Ashing It Out"	February 7, 2024	1.04
284	16	"Diamonds in the Rough"	February 14, 2024	0.94
285	17	"Soirees and Separations"	February 21, 2024	1.08
Kyle throws a huge white party on a football field and asks Erika if she will perform, (which she calls her comeback) & she agrees but a special guest of a former friend helps Kyle prepare. Sutton shops with her daughter and they have special bonding time together. The time has come for the party with all the wives, husbands, children and even a few former faces appear. Everyone has a good time & things end on a good note for almost everyone. Kyle has to come face to face with certain issues getting out in the press and she & Mauricio have a family discussion.
286	18	"Reunion Part 1"	February 28, 2024	1.14
The ladies discuss events during Season 13 of the show. Things get heated as Dorit remains in the hot seat for the most part. She battles with Garcelle over comments she made and also deals with something about Crystal. Annemarie and Crystal also clear the air about the whole doctor and nurse thing. Kyle and Dorit's friendship is questioned.
287	19	"Reunion Part 2"	March 6, 2024	1.13
In part 2, Sutton and Kyle battle it out, talking about the drinking insinuations as well as having an ED. A discussion about Dorit and her robberies come up and something Garcelle says really hurt Dorit. By the end, Sutton battles some of the ladies after her meltdown at Magic Mike.
288	20	"Reunion Part 3"	March 13, 2024	1.06
Kathy Hilton joins the ladies and they discuss when they last saw her. As they get into it something happens with Sutton where she doesn't feel well. After this, Kyle is in the hot seat talking about Mo, Morgan, Kathy and other things that have been in the press.
