= The Real Housewives of Beverly Hills season 10 =

The Real Housewives of Beverly Hills
- Season 10
- Cover used by the iTunes Store; Left to right: Beauvais, Denise Richards, Rinna, Kyle Richards, Girardi, Kemsley and Mellencamp
- Starring: Kyle Richards; Lisa Rinna; Erika Girardi; Dorit Kemsley; Teddi Mellencamp; Denise Richards; Garcelle Beauvais
- No. of episodes: 20

Release
- Original network: Bravo
- Original release: April 15 – September 23, 2020

Season chronology
- ← Previous; Season 9 Next → Season 11

The tenth season of The Real Housewives of Beverly Hills, an American reality television series, aired on Bravo from April 15, 2020, to September 23, 2020, and is primarily filmed in Beverly Hills, California.

The season focuses on the personal and professional lives of Kyle Richards, Lisa Rinna, Erika Girardi, Dorit Kemsley, Teddi Mellencamp, Denise Richards and Garcelle Beauvais. The season consisted of 20 episodes.

The season's executive producers are Andrew Hoegl, Barrie Bernstein, Lisa Shannon, Pam Healy and Andy Cohen.

This season marked the final regular appearances for both Teddi Mellencamp Arroyave and Denise Richards.

== Production and crew ==
Alex Baskin, Chris Cullen, Douglas Ross, Greg Stewart, Toni Gallagher, Dave Rupel and Andy Cohen are recognized as the series' executive producers; it is produced and distributed by Evolution Media. The reunion for the show's tenth season was filmed in July 2020.

== Cast ==
In June 2019, Lisa Vanderpump announced she had departed the series. All housewives of the previous season returned, along with Garcelle Beauvais joining the cast in a regular capacity, and Sutton Stracke joins the cast as a friend of the housewives. Stracke was initially set to join the cast in regular capacity; however, due to her ex-husband's refusal to allow their children to film, she was demoted. Vanderpump's departure made Kyle Richards the only remaining original cast member.

Eileen Davidson, Brandi Glanville, Camille Grammer, Faye Resnick, Kim Richards and Adrienne Maloof made guest appearances throughout the season. In September 2020, Denise Richards and Teddi Mellencamp Arroyave announced their exits from the franchise.

== Episodes ==
The Real Housewives of Beverly Hills season 10 episodes
No. overall	No. in season	Title	Original release date	U.S. viewers (millions)
201	1	"The Crown Isn't So Heavy"	April 15, 2020	1.35
During a trip to the east coast, Kyle Richards launches her new clothing line during the 2019 New York Fashion Week, while Erika Girardi takes the ladies to the establishment where she worked as a stripper for two years in Carlstadt, New Jersey. Back in Los Angeles, Denise Richards introduces the ladies to Garcelle Beauvais.
202	2	"To Live and Text in Beverly Hills"	April 22, 2020	1.35
Following her showing at Fashion Week, Kyle Richards attempts to lure buyers to her new line, while Girardi receives a career opportunity that would keep her in New York for an extended period of time.
203	3	"First Impressions, True Confessions"	April 29, 2020	1.52
After filming wraps for her new film, Kyle Richards organizes a party for her friends as a "welcome home" gathering; Sutton Stracke's opinion does not sit well with Teddi Mellencamp.
204	4	"All's Fair in Glam and War"	May 6, 2020	1.64
Beauvais and Lisa Rinna opt to not attend Mellencamp's retreat following an awkward invitation, while the other ladies experience a not-so-relaxing experience; Girardi and Kyle Richards begin to question the all-about-me behavior exhibited by Dorit Kemsley.
205	5	"Let the Mouse Go!"	May 13, 2020	1.45
Kyle Richards experiences an emotional meltdown, which causes Rinna and Mellencamp to butt heads; Kemsley and Stracke begin to engage in a game of cat-and-mouse, and a milestone happens in Beauvais's sons' lives, which causes her to celebrate.
206	6	"Read Between the Signs"	May 20, 2020	1.59
Following her building frustration, Denise Richards leaves Rinna speechless; when Girardi hosts an astrology party, past issues between some of the women begin to resurface.
207	7	"Santa Denise"	May 27, 2020	1.52
During a trip, Rinna begins to feel judged as a mother by Denise Richards. When an out-of-town job opportunity arises for Beauvais, the pros and the cons of being a working mother begin to weigh on her.
208	8	"Mind Your P's and BBQ's"	June 3, 2020	1.63
When honored for her charitable work, Beauvais gives an acceptance speech that leaves one of the guests feeling less than charitable. When Denise Richards shows up to a kid-friendly party without her children, it leaves some of the ladies annoyed and feeling mom-shamed.
209	9	"Until We Leave Again"	July 8, 2020	1.38
After Denise Richards's abrupt exit, the ladies are left feeling confused. After Kim Richards has a delicate medical procedure, her sister helps care for her. As Beauvais moves into her new home, Denise Richards' husband faces Girardi and Mellencamp.
210	10	"Black Ties and White Lies"	July 15, 2020	1.41
During a business meeting, Beauvais finds herself in a difficult position, while Rinna begins to question Denise Richards' motives. Kyle Richards hosts a charity gala, where Camille Grammer finds it difficult to achieve reconciliation with some of the ladies.
211	11	"Kiss and Tell All"	July 22, 2020	1.41
When Denise Richards tries to make amends with Erika Girardi, she is met with the cold shoulder. While Garcelle Beauvais looks into Sutton Stracke's past, Brandi Glanville reveals some information, leaving Teddi Mellencamp and Kyle Richards taken aback.
212	12	"Roman Rumors"	July 29, 2020	1.56
After arriving in Rome, Teddi Mellencamp and Kyle Richards share the rumours concerning Denise Richards and Brandi Glanville with Lisa Rinna. After a quiet first evening and a day of exploring, Mellencamp decides to confront Denise with Glanville's allegations of her bad-talking the other women. Sutton Stracke questions Mellencamp's intentions for raising her issues at dinner with everyone present.
213	13	"There's No Place Like Rome"	August 5, 2020	1.30
The ladies head back to their rooms in two groups to discuss the events of dinner. Denise Richards meets with Lisa Rinna the morning after and asks why she didn't support her during the confrontation. Kyle Richards and Dorit Kemsley also meet to discuss their disagreement and are able to move forward. The ladies spent the day enjoying room before the revelations from the previous night are raised once again.
214	14	"That's Not Amore"	August 12, 2020	1.58
The ladies continue to discuss Brandi Glanville and who is telling the truth. After their final day in Rome the group sits down to dinner again where Denise Richards shares her opinion on how the group has treated her and production steps in to stop her fleeing the scene before a resolution can be found.
215	15	"Sex, Lies and Text Messages"	August 19, 2020	1.40
Kyle Richards and Dorit Kemsley host Teddi Mellencamp's baby shower at Buca di Beppo. Denise Richards calls to say she is unwell and won't be attending. Brandi Glanville arrives with texts she claim prove her relationship with Denise, yet Kemsley continues to question her honesty.
216	16	"Denise and Desist"	August 26, 2020	1.61
Dorit Kemsley hosts a housewarming to support the launch of PK Kemsley's new business venture. Denise Richards confuses the ladies after confirming her attendance, but then leaving Garcelle Beauvais waiting outside her hotel and ignoring their calls. Brandi Glanville arrives as Kim Richards' plus-one and admits she told Denise she would be attending. It is later revealed that Denise sent cease and desist letters to cast and producers; later, she meets with Lisa Rinna to discuss the events of the past few months. The ladies visit Erika Girardi in New York during her run on broadway.
217	17	"Reunion Part 1"	September 2, 2020	1.70
In the first-part of the reunion, the housewives discuss Garcelle Beauvais and Sutton Stracke's first season, in particular Beauvais' issues with Kyle Richards, and Stracke's feelings towards Teddi Mellencamp. The ladies also voice their frustrations over Denise Richards' reactions to their adult conversations at her dinner party.
218	18	"Reunion Part 2"	September 9, 2020	1.47
As the reunion continues, Denise Richards gets defiant when confronted about her and Brandi Glanville's connection. Teddi Melencamp discusses the ups and downs of parenting during the COVID-19 pandemic in the United States, and Kyle Richards is asked about her feelings towards Dorit Kemsley and Erika Girardi.
219	19	"Reunion Part 3"	September 16, 2020	1.50
In the third and final part of the reunion, the ladies voice their concerns over Denise Richards' marriage. Garcelle Beauvais is questioned over her lack of support over Erika Girardi's Broadway debut, and Denise comes clean regarding the truth of her relationship with Brandi Glanville.
220	20	"Secrets Revealed"	September 23, 2020	0.78
