= Amanda Frances =

American author and television personality

- Born: Amanda Frances McKinney; September 12, 1985 (age 41); Sand Springs, Oklahoma, U.S.
- Occupations: Coach; author; writer
- Years active: 2011–present
- Known for: The Real Housewives of Beverly Hills
- Spouse: Eddie Tsivislavsky (m. 2025)
- Children: 4
- Website: amandafrances.com

Amanda Frances (born September 12, 1985) is an American financial coach, writer, author and entrepreneur. Frances built her online coaching and personal development company, Amanda Frances Inc., and published the book Rich as F*ck: More Money Than You Know What to Do With (2020). She gained greater notoriety when she joined the cast of Bravo's The Real Housewives of Beverly Hills in 2025.

== Early life and education ==
Frances grew up in Sand Springs, Oklahoma. While in high school, Frances was recruited by youth pastors to join a forthcoming church in Florida. She left the church due to its isolation. She has since called it a cult. She studied psychology at Oral Roberts University, before relocating to Dallas, Texas to study for a master's degree in counseling, where she worked as a nanny for families in the Highland Park neighborhood, a cocktail server, barista, and therapist before she built her coaching business.

== Career ==
In 2011, after dropping out of her P.h.D program, Frances started her online coaching business focused on personal development, mindfulness, neuroscience, and the psychology of money for women. With that, she's written financial advice articles for Forbes (where she was previously a council member and contributor), Business Insider, and Glamour South Africa. Frances said her first seven-figure year came in 2017. In 2018, she reported her digital course company, Amanda Frances Inc., grossed nearly $3 million in revenue, and earned $1 million in the first quarter of 2019. As of 2026, she has over 21,000 clients in 100 countries. Frances and her philosophy have been cited in news coverage of the online business-coaching industry including British Vogue, Entrepreneur, Business Insider, The Cut, and The New York Times who have dubbed Frances as the "Money Queen".

In January 2021, Frances self-published her first book Rich as F*ck: More Money Than You Know What to Do With. According to People, the audiobook was among Audible's fastest-growing titles in its first 48 hours.

In August 2026, Frances released her second book, Holy F*ck: God Wants You to Have It All (formerly referred to as Godly as F*ck), which she described as a personal account of her relationship with faith, beginning with her departure from the religious group she fled as a young adult.

In 2025, Frances was announced as the newest cast member of the fifteenth season of The Real Housewives of Beverly Hills on Bravo. On Wednesday, August 5, 2026, Frances announced via Instagram that she would not be returning to the series after only one season.

== Personal life ==
Frances married Eddie Tsivislavsky in a courthouse wedding on September 9, 2025, in Laguna Hills, California. They have three children together, in addition to two children from Tsivislavsky's first marriage, and reside in both Bel Air, Los Angeles, and Newport Beach.

== Bibliography ==
- Rich as F*ck: More Money Than You Know What to Do With. December 17, 2020. ISBN 978-1735375113.
- Holy F*ck: God Wants You To Have It All. August 18, 2026. ASIN B0HD3RXFS9.
