= Window Warriors =

- Genre: Reality competition
- Presented by: Garcelle Beauvais
- Judges: Carson Kressley; Tai Beauchamp; Douglas Little
- Country of origin: United States
- Original language: English
- No. of seasons: 1
- No. of episodes: 6

Production
- Executive producers: Michael Levitt; Jill Goularte; Liz Cook

Original release
- Network: Game Show Network
- Release: November 15 – December 19, 2016

Window Warriors is an American reality competition series on Game Show Network which premiered November 15, 2016.

== Production ==
Garcelle Beauvais hosted the show, while Carson Kressley, Tai Beauchamp, and Douglas Little served as judges. The show featured eight "window merchandising designers" who competed in themed contests. The champion was awarded $100,000 and given a deal to architect a sizable New York store's holiday exhibit.

== Contestants ==
(Contestants names and locations are stated on website and during the show.)

Contestant	Hometown	Outcome
Timothy Howe	Los Angeles, CA	Winner
Edward Sajovic	Cleveland, OH	Runner-up
Tara Meagher	San Anselmo, CA	Third place
Spenser Zalkin	Carmel, IN	4th place
Erin O'Brien	New York, NY	5th place
Gerardo Mellado	Guaynabo, Puerto Rico	6th place
Shani Coleman	New Orleans, LA	7th place
Brittany Bush	Long Beach, CA	8th place

== Contestant Progress ==
Contestant	1	2	3	4	5	6
Timothy	WIN	SAFE	SAFE	HIGH	WIN	Winner
Edward	SAFE	HIGH	LOW	WIN	HIGH	Runner-up
Tara	SAFE	WIN	SAFE	LOW	LOW	Third place
Spenser	LOW	LOW	WIN	HIGH	ELIM	Guest
Erin	SAFE	SAFE	HIGH	ELIM		Guest
Gerardo	SAFE	SAFE	ELIM			Guest
Shani	HIGH	ELIM				Guest
Brittany	ELIM					

The contestant won.
The contestant came in second-place.
The contestant came in third-place
The contestant won the challenge.
The contestant was in the top.
The contestant was in the bottom two.
The contestant was eliminated.
The contestant returned as a guest for the finale episode.

== Episodes ==
No. overall	No. in season	Title	Original release date
1	1	"All Dressed Up"	November 15, 2016
Contestants design showcases for a beautiful dress fit for a celebration.
2	2	"A Breath of Fresh Air"	November 22, 2016
Contestants design their windows with materials by Lush.
3	3	"At the Cutting Edge"	November 29, 2016
Contestants get assigned a team challenge and design their windows by Hot Topic and get to use live models in their windows.
4	4	"Sugar Rush"	December 5, 2016
The remaining window designers showcase a cupcake company Sprinkles, that look good as they taste; tensions escalate between the contestants.
5	5	"Reuse It or Lose It"	December 12, 2016
The window designers compete in creative clothing challenge using re-produced material in their displays; a twist in the challenge.
6	6	"Whimsical Wonderland"	December 19, 2016
The three remaining window designers create two special holiday windows with help from past competitors.
