= Teddi Mellencamp Arroyave =

American television personality

- Born: Teddi Jo Mellencamp; July 1, 1981 (age 45); Bloomington, Indiana, U.S.
- Citizenship: United States
- Occupation: Television personality • actress • podcast host • accountability coach
- Years active: 1992–present
- Television: The Real Housewives of Beverly Hills
- Spouses: Matt Robertson (m. 2006; div. 2010) Edwin Arroyave (m. 2011; sep. 2024)
- Children: 3
- Parents: John Mellencamp (father); Victoria Granucci (mother)

Teddi Jo Mellencamp Arroyave (born July 1, 1981) is an American television personality, actress and podcast host who appeared as a main cast member on three seasons of Bravo's reality series The Real Housewives of Beverly Hills (2017–2020). She is the daughter of singer-songwriter John Mellencamp.

== Career ==
In addition to formerly starring on The Real Housewives of Beverly Hills, Mellencamp is the founder and owner of "All In by Teddi", a lifestyle and fitness company. The company's program has attracted criticism for its lack of transparency and medical supervision, untrained health coaches, and extreme weight loss methods.

One of the key criticisms is that the program and menu are the same for everyone who signs up, with a strict meal plan that reportedly involves consuming fewer than 700 calories per day. Subscribers' failure to adhere to the plan, as well as evidence of weight gain, results in immediate dismissal from the program without the chance of a refund (with few exceptions).

Mellencamp co-hosts a weekly Bravo-centric podcast titled Two T's in a Pod with fellow reality television personality Tamra Judge; the current podcast evolved from Teddi Tea Pod, which covered trends, entertainment, family life and current events. In 2022, Mellencamp was the first houseguest to be evicted on the third season of Celebrity Big Brother. On November 29, 2023, she worked as a special correspondent for Extra interviewing guests at "DirecTV Celebrates Christmas at Kathy's" event.

In 2026, Mellencamp competed on season fourteen of The Masked Singer as "Calla Lily". She was eliminated on "Red, White and Clue Celebration of America's 250th Birthday" and talked about herself being cancer-free.

== Personal life ==
Mellencamp was raised by her mother, Victoria Granucci, on Hilton Head Island, South Carolina. She is the daughter of singer John Mellencamp. She married filmmaker Matt Robertson in Indiana in June 2006. She filed for divorce from Robertson in July 2009, and the divorce was finalized in 2010. In December 2008, Mellencamp met Edwin Arroyave, the CEO of a security company, for what she thought would be a "one-time fling"; they married in 2011. The couple have three children together. She is also the stepmother to her husband's daughter from a previous marriage.

In March 2022, Mellencamp was diagnosed with stage II melanoma, a type of skin cancer, which was promptly removed. In February 2025, she was hospitalized as a result of numerous brain tumors, which produced debilitating headaches for several weeks and had been silently growing for six months. In April 2025, she announced her melanoma had progressed to stage IV.

Teddi Mellencamp announced in late 2025 that she is "cancer-free" with "no detectable cancer" after her melanoma battle, but continues to undergo immunotherapy treatments.

== Filmography ==
Film and television
Year	Title	Role	Notes
1992	Falling from Grace	P.J.'s Child	Film
2017–2020, 2021–2024	The Real Housewives of Beverly Hills	Herself	Main cast (seasons 8–10), guest (seasons 11–13), 72 episodes
2018	Flipping Out	Herself	Accountability coach; Episode: "Trimming the Fat"
2018	Vanderpump Rules	Herself	Episode: "Either Him or Me"
2019	Next Level	Mrs. Stallings	Film
2020	Celebrity Family Feud	Herself	Episode: "Andy Cohen vs. Real Housewives of Beverly Hills and Kevin Nealon vs. Drew Carey"
2021	The Prince	Herself	Voice; Episode: "Beverly Hills"
2022	Celebrity Big Brother	Herself	Houseguest (11th place); 5 episodes
2023–2024, 2026	The Real Housewives of Orange County	Herself	Guest; 6 episodes
2023	Extra	Special Correspondent	1 episode
2024	Name That Tune	Contestant	Episode: "Comedy Classics & Real Housewives"
2026	The Masked Singer	Contestant	2 episodes
