= The Real Housewives of Beverly Hills =

American reality television series

- Genre: Reality
- Starring: Kyle Richards; Lisa Vanderpump; Kim Richards; Taylor Armstrong; Adrienne Maloof; Camille Grammer; Brandi Glanville; Yolanda Hadid; Carlton Gebbia; Joyce Giraud de Ohoven; Lisa Rinna; Eileen Davidson; Erika Girardi; Kathryn Edwards; Dorit Kemsley; Teddi Mellencamp Arroyave; Denise Richards; Garcelle Beauvais; Sutton Stracke; Crystal Kung Minkoff; Diana Jenkins; Annemarie Wiley; Bozoma Saint John; Rachel Zoe; Amanda Frances
- Country of origin: United States
- Original language: English
- No. of seasons: 15
- No. of episodes: 329 (list of episodes)

Production
- Executive producers: Alex Baskin; Andy Cohen; Christopher Cullen; Toni Gallagher; Douglas Ross; Dave Rupel
- Producers: Christopher Cullen; Kimberly Goodman; Sally-Anne King; Anthony McLemore; Julie Murphy; Ken Schoech
- Camera setup: Multiple
- Running time: 41–43 minutes
- Production companies: Evolution Media; 32 Flavors (2023–present)

Original release
- Network: Bravo
- Release: October 14, 2010 – present

Related
- Vanderpump Rules; Vanderpump Dogs

The Real Housewives of Beverly Hills (abbreviated as RHOBH) is an American reality television series which has been broadcast on Bravo since October 14, 2010. Developed as the sixth installment of The Real Housewives franchise, it has aired fifteen seasons and focuses on the personal and professional lives of women who live in or near Beverly Hills, California.

The fifteenth season cast consisted of Kyle Richards, Erika Girardi, Dorit Kemsley, Sutton Stracke, Bozoma Saint John, Rachel Zoe and Amanda Frances. Kathy Hilton, Jennifer Tilly and Natalie Swanston Fuller served as "friends of the housewives".

The success of the show has resulted in two spin-offs: Vanderpump Rules and Vanderpump Dogs revolving around original cast member Lisa Vanderpump.

== Overview ==
=== Seasons 1–4 ===
The Real Housewives of Beverly Hills was announced in March 2010 as the sixth series in The Real Housewives franchise. The first season featured Taylor Armstrong, Camille Grammer, Adrienne Maloof, sisters Kim and Kyle Richards, and Lisa Vanderpump, with no recurring cast members. The show premiered on October 14, 2010, and ended on February 15, 2011. Due to the show's initial success, it was awarded Best Reality Series at the 2011 Critics Choice Awards.

The second season began on September 5, 2011, with all six housewives returning as main cast members. Two new housewives were introduced in recurring roles: Brandi Glanville as Maloof's friend and Dana Wilkey as Armstrong's friend. The second season was re-edited following the death of Armstrong's husband, Russell Armstrong, who died by suicide on August 15, 2011. Grammer announced her departure after the season ended on February 16, 2012, citing personal reasons. Wilkey departed from the show in early 2012.

The third season premiered on November 5, 2012. Glanville was added to the main cast, along with a new housewife, Yolanda Foster. Marisa Zanuck and Faye Resnick were introduced as Kyle Richards' friends and are now recurring cast members. Grammer also announced her return as a friend of the housewives. Maloof did not attend the season reunion special, effectively leaving the series. Armstrong announced her departure from the show after the season ended on April 8, 2013.

The fourth season aired on November 4, 2013. The season introduced two new housewives: Carlton Gebbia and Joyce Giraud, both of whom joined as main cast members. Grammer, Resnick, and Zanuck, all three recurring cast members, left the series before its announcement. Armstrong also made several guest appearances throughout the season. After the show ended on April 7, 2014, Gebbia and Giraud were not invited back.

=== Seasons 5–8 ===
The fifth season premiered on November 18, 2014, and featured all of the remaining housewives from season four. Two new housewives joined the main cast: Lisa Rinna and Eileen Davidson. Throughout the season, original housewives Adrienne Maloof, Camille Grammer, and Taylor Armstrong made guest appearances. After the season ended on April 21, 2015, neither Brandi Glanville nor Kim Richards were asked to return.

The sixth season aired on December 1, 2015. Two new housewives joined the main cast: Erika Jayne and Kathryn Edwards. Maloof, Grammer, Armstrong, Glanville, and Richards appeared as guests throughout the season, as did Faye Resnick, a previous recurring cast member. Bethenny Frankel, a cast member of The Real Housewives of New York City, appeared as a guest through Kyle Richards. The season ended on May 10, 2016; cast member Yolanda Foster left the series due to health issues, and Edwards left after one season.

The seventh season aired on December 6, 2016. Dorit Kemsley joined the show's main cast, while Eden Sassoon, Rinna's friend, joined as a recurring cast member. Meyer and Kim Richards also appeared as guests throughout the season. After the season concluded on April 25, 2017, Davidson left the series, and Sassoon was not invited back.

The eighth season aired on December 19, 2017. Teddi Mellencamp Arroyave joined the main cast, and Camille Meyer (formerly Camille Grammer) returned to the show in a recurring role. Davidson, Frankel, Maloof, and Resnick also appeared as guests throughout the season. The season's final episode aired on May 15, 2018.

=== Seasons 9–12 ===
The ninth season premiered on February 12, 2019. It featured all six cast members from the previous season, with Denise Richards joining the cast. Grammer Meyer returned once again as a friend of the housewives, while Kim Richards, Glanville, and Resnick all appeared as guests. Vanderpump exited the show after the ninth season and did not attend the season nine reunion.

Garcelle Beauvais joined the cast as a main cast member in the tenth season, which premiered on April 15, 2020. Sutton Stracke also debuted in the show as a friend of the housewives. Meyer, Kim Richards, Maloof, Glanville, Davidson, and Resnick also made guest appearances during the season. Denise Richards announced her departure from the show after the tenth season, while Mellencamp was dismissed from the cast.

The eleventh season, which premiered on May 19, 2021, featured Crystal Kung Minkoff joining the show and Stracke joining the main cast, while Kathy Hilton formally joined the cast in a "friend of the housewives" capacity after having appeared sporadically throughout the series since its inception. Former housewife Mellencamp Arroyave made a guest appearance in the season.

The twelfth season, which premiered on May 11, 2022, featured the entire cast of the eleventh season returning, with new housewife Diana Jenkins and new friend of the housewives Sheree Zampino joining the cast. Former cast members Mellencamp Arroyave and Resnick made guest appearances. In January 2023, Rinna announced her exit from the show following the conclusion of the twelfth series, as did Jenkins after only one season. In June 2023, Hilton announced her departure.

=== Season 13–present ===
The thirteenth season, which premiered on October 25, 2023, featured the remaining six housewives from the twelfth season returning, along with Annemarie Wiley joining as a housewife. Former cast members Kim Richards, Grammer, Resnick, Denise Richards, and Mellencamp Arroyave made guest appearances. Kathy Hilton also made a guest appearance during the season's reunion. In March 2024, Wiley announced her departure from the series. In April 2024, Kung Minkoff also confirmed her departure from the show after three seasons.

The fourteenth season, which premiered on November 19, 2024, featured the five remaining housewives from the previous season returning, alongside newest housewife Bozoma Saint John joining the cast, as well as a new friend of the housewives and actress Jennifer Tilly joining, and Kathy Hilton returning in a "friend of the housewives" capacity. Former cast members Grammer and Resnick made guest appearances during the season. In March 2025, Beauvais announced her departure from the show after five seasons. In June 2025, fashion designer Rachel Zoe was announced as a full-time cast member for the fifteenth season.

The fifteenth season premiered on December 4, 2025, featuring the five remaining housewives and two "friends of the housewives" from the previous season returning, alongside new housewives Rachel Zoe and Amanda Frances, and new "friend of the housewives" Natalie Swanston Fuller. Former cast members Denise Richards and Resnick made guest appearances during the season. In August 2026, Frances announced her departure from the series. That same month, it was announced Tracy Tutor, formerly from Million Dollar Listing Los Angeles, and actress Leah Remini had joined the cast for the sixteenth season.

== Cast ==
Main cast members
| Cast member | Seasons | | | | | | | | | | | | | | |
| Cast member | 1 | 2 | 3 | 4 | 5 | 6 | 7 | 8 | 9 | 10 | 11 | 12 | 13 | 14 | 15 |
|---|---|---|---|---|---|---|---|---|---|---|---|---|---|---|---|
| Taylor Armstrong | Main | Main | Main | Guest | Guest | Guest | | | | | | | | | |
| Camille Grammer | Main | Main | Friend | | Guest | Guest | Guest | Friend | Friend | Guest | | | Guest | Guest | |
| Adrienne Maloof | Main | Main | Main | | Guest | Guest | | Guest | | Guest | | | | | |
| Kim Richards | Main | Main | Main | Main | Main | Guest | Guest | | Guest | Guest | | | Guest | | |
| Kyle Richards | Main | Main | Main | Main | Main | Main | Main | Main | Main | Main | Main | Main | Main | Main | Main |
| Lisa Vanderpump | Main | Main | Main | Main | Main | Main | Main | Main | Main | | | | | | |
| Brandi Glanville | | Friend | Main | Main | Main | Guest | | | Guest | Guest | | | | | |
| Yolanda Hadid | | | Main | Main | Main | Main | | | | | | | | | |
| Carlton Gebbia | | | | Main | | | | | | | | | | | |
| Joyce Giraud de Ohoven | | | | Main | | | | | | | | | | | |
| Eileen Davidson | | | | | Main | Main | Main | Guest | | Guest | | | | | |
| Lisa Rinna | | | | Guest | Main | Main | Main | Main | Main | Main | Main | Main | | | |
| Kathryn Edwards | | | | | | Main | | | | | | | | | |
| Erika Girardi | | | | | | Main | Main | Main | Main | Main | Main | Main | Main | Main | Main |
| Dorit Kemsley | | | | | | | Main | Main | Main | Main | Main | Main | Main | Main | Main |
| Teddi Mellencamp Arroyave | | | | | | | | Main | Main | Main | Guest | Guest | Guest | | |
| Denise Richards | | | | | Guest | | | | Main | Main | | | Guest | | Guest |
| Garcelle Beauvais | | | | | | | | | | Main | Main | Main | Main | Main | |
| Crystal Kung Minkoff | | | | | | | | | | | Main | Main | Main | | |
| Sutton Stracke | | | | | | | | | | Friend | Main | Main | Main | Main | Main |
| Diana Jenkins | | | | | | | | | | | | Main | | | |
| Annemarie Wiley | | | | | | | | | | | | | Main | | |
| Bozoma Saint John | | | | | | | | | | | | | | Main | Main |
| Amanda Frances | | | | | | | | | | | | | | | Main |
| Rachel Zoe | | | | | | | | | | | | | | | Main |
Friends of the housewives
| Dana Wilkey | Guest | Friend | Guest | | | | | | | | | | | | |
| Faye Resnick | Guest | Guest | Friend | | Guest | Guest | Guest | | Guest | Guest | Guest | | Guest | Guest | Guest |
| Marisa Zanuck | | | Friend | | | | | | | | | | | | |
| Eden Sassoon | | | | | | | Friend | | | | | | | | |
| Kathy Hilton | Guest | | Guest | Guest | Guest | | | | Guest | Guest | Friend | Friend | Guest | Friend | Friend |
| Sheree Zampino | | | | Guest | | | | | | Guest | Guest | Friend | | | |
| Jennifer Tilly | | | | | | | | | | Guest | | Guest | Guest | Friend | Friend |
| Natalie Swanston Fuller | | | | | | | | | | | | | | | Friend |

== Episodes ==
The Real Housewives of Beverly Hills episodes
| Season | Episodes | Originally released | | Average Viewers (millions) |
| Season | Episodes | First released | Last released | Average Viewers (millions) |
|---|---|---|---|---|
| 1 | 17 | October 14, 2010 | February 15, 2011 | 1.92 |
| 2 | 24 | September 5, 2011 | February 16, 2012 | 2.17 |
| 3 | 22 | November 5, 2012 | April 8, 2013 | 1.99 |
| 4 | 23 | November 4, 2013 | April 7, 2014 | 1.81 |
| 5 | 23 | November 18, 2014 | April 21, 2015 | 1.81 |
| 6 | 24 | December 1, 2015 | May 10, 2016 | 1.75 |
| 7 | 21 | December 6, 2016 | April 25, 2017 | 1.73 |
| 8 | 22 | December 19, 2017 | May 15, 2018 | 1.63 |
| 9 | 24 | February 12, 2019 | July 30, 2019 | 1.66 |
| 10 | 20 | April 15, 2020 | September 23, 2020 | 1.46 |
| 11 | 24 | May 19, 2021 | November 3, 2021 | 1.19 |
| 12 | 24 | May 11, 2022 | October 26, 2022 | 1.16 |
| 13 | 20 | October 25, 2023 | March 13, 2024 | 1.03 |
| 14 | 20 | November 19, 2024 | April 15, 2025 | 0.82 |
| 15 | 21 | December 4, 2025 | May 7, 2026 | 0.72 |

== Broadcast history ==
The Real Housewives of Beverly Hills airs regularly on Bravo in the United States; most episodes are approximately forty-two to forty-four minutes in length, and are broadcast in standard definition and high definition. Since its premiere, the series has alternated airing on Monday, Tuesday, Wednesday, and Thursday evenings and has been frequently shifted between the 8:00, 9:00, and 10:00 PM timeslots.

== In popular culture ==
The music video for Lady Gaga's 2014 song "G.U.Y." features then-cast members from season four.

In 2014, Camille Grammer, Kyle Richards and Brandi Glanville appeared in the comedy film The Hungover Games, making cameo appearances as Housewives.

In 2019, a screen cap from the season two episode "Malibu Beach Party from Hell" began trending as the "Woman yelling at a cat" meme, featuring cast members Taylor Armstrong and Kyle Richards followed by a picture of a cat sitting at a dinner table. It later won Meme of the Year at the Shorty Awards in 2020, with Armstrong virtually accepting the award.

In 2021, Brandi Glanville joined RHOA star Kenya Moore and RHOP star Candiace Dillard Bassett in a parody of the Real Housewives franchise on a show called Family Reunion.
