= Paris in Love =

American reality television series

- Genre: Reality
- Starring: Paris Hilton; Carter Reum
- Country of origin: United States
- Original language: English
- No. of seasons: 2
- No. of episodes: 21

Production
- Executive producers: Andrea Metz; Bridgette Theriault; Bruce Gersh; Dan Peirson; Lisa Shannon; Mike Darnell; Paris Hilton; Perry Dance

Original release
- Network: Peacock
- Release: November 11, 2021 – November 30, 2023

Paris in Love is an American reality television series which focuses on media personality Paris Hilton as she plans her wedding to Carter Reum. The 13-episode first season debuted on November 11, 2021 on Peacock. In February 2023, the series was renewed for a second season, which was released on November 30, 2023.

== Premise ==
Paris in Love season 1 follows Hilton "through all the major milestones and highlights of planning a wedding. From her engagement party in New York, to bridal dress shopping, hunting for the perfect venues for the three-day celebration, the joint bachelor-bachelorette party in Las Vegas and the bridal shower hosted by Kathy Hilton".

Season 2 of Paris in Love focuses on the birth of Paris' first son, Phoenix, as well as the planning and execution of her first ever concert. She also continues her journey of therapy and healing.

== Cast ==
- Paris Hilton
- Carter Reum
- Kathy Hilton
- Nicky Hilton Rothschild

== Production ==
The series is produced by Warner Bros. Unscripted Television, in association with Shed Media, Telepictures and Slivington Manor Entertainment. It is executive produced by Mike Darnell, Lisa Shannon, Dan Peirson, Bridgette Theriault, Andrea Metz, Perry Dance, Paris Hilton and Bruce Gersh.

== Episodes ==
=== Series overview ===
Season	Episodes	Originally released	
Season	Episodes	First released	Last released
1	13	November 11, 2021	January 27, 2022
2	8	November 30, 2023	

=== Season 1 (2021–22) ===
No. overall	No. in season	Title	Original release date
1	1	"The Unengaged Bride"	November 11, 2021
2	2	"A Mother of a Bride"	November 18, 2021
3	3	"You Can Go Home Again"	November 25, 2021
4	4	"Live from Las Vegas"	December 2, 2021
5	5	"The Michigan Life"	December 9, 2021
6	6	"The Fashion and the Furious"	December 16, 2021
7	7	"Serendipity and Secrets"	December 23, 2021
8	8	"Past Imperfect"	December 30, 2021
9	9	"Too Close for Carter"	January 6, 2022
10	10	"Bachelor Party Bacchanal"	January 13, 2022
11	11	"Ms. Hilton Goes to Washington"	January 20, 2022
12	12	"I Do, Don't I? Part 1"	January 27, 2022
13	13	"I Do, Don't I? Part 2"	January 27, 2022

=== Season 2 (2023) ===
No. overall	No. in season	Title	Original release date
14	1	"Big Little Secret"	November 30, 2023
15	2	"Phoenix Is Rising"	November 30, 2023
16	3	"Boy Meets World"	November 30, 2023
17	4	"Truth and Consequences"	November 30, 2023
18	5	"Paris Tells All"	November 30, 2023
19	6	"Capitol Hilton"	November 30, 2023
20	7	"The Show Must Go On?"	November 30, 2023
21	8	"Seeking the Simple Life"	November 30, 2023

== Release ==
Paris in Love premiered on November 11, 2021 on Peacock, with the platform releasing the series' episodes on a weekly basis. The final episode was released in two parts on January 27, 2022. The series also aired on E!, from February 2, 2022 to April 26, 2022.
