= Kathy Hilton =

American socialite (born 1959)

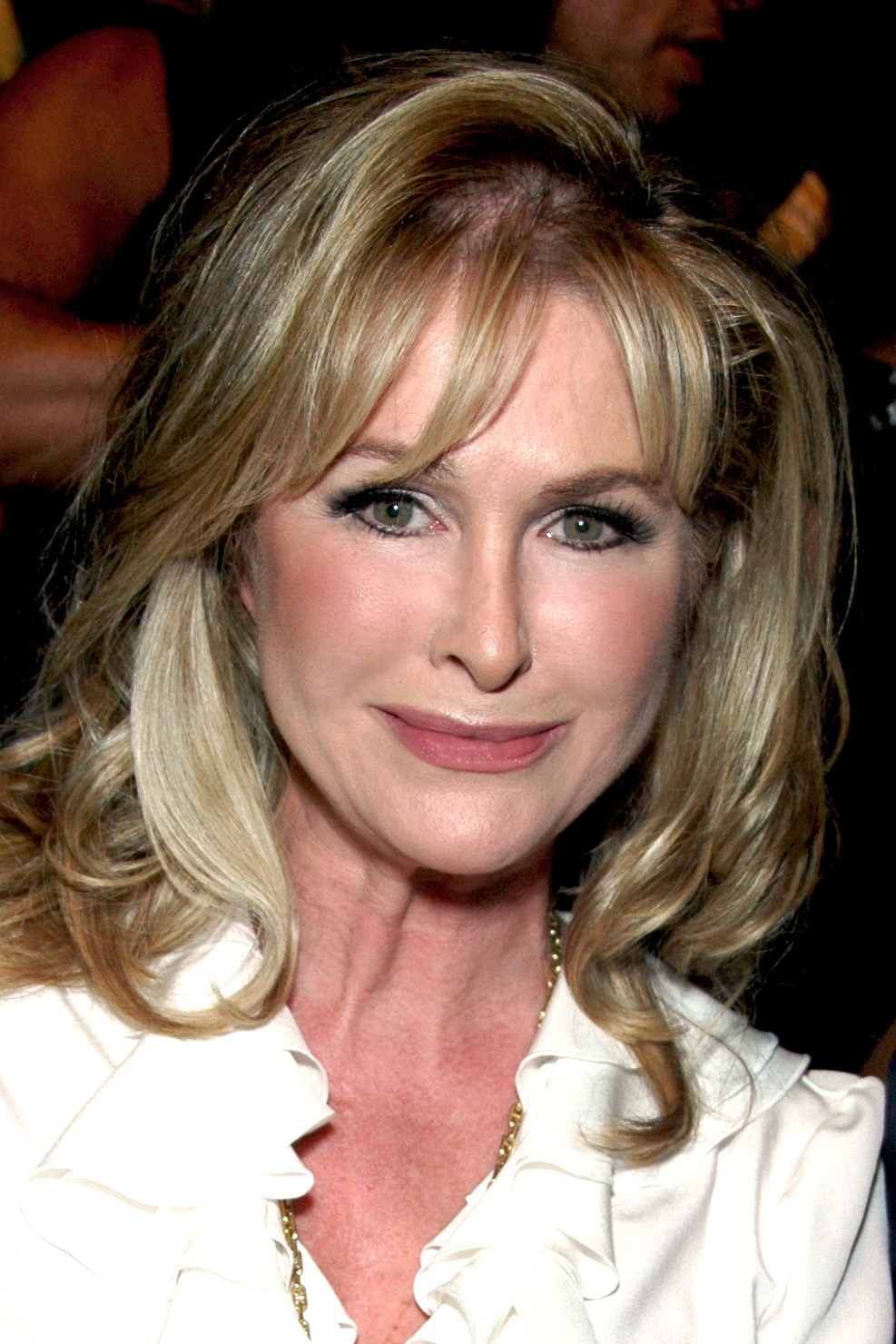
- Hilton in March 2008
- Born: Kathleen Elizabeth Avanzino; March 13, 1959 (age 67); New York City, U.S.
- Occupations: Actress; fashion designer
- Spouse: Richard Hilton (m. 1979)
- Children: 4, including Paris and Nicky Hilton
- Relatives: Kim Richards (half-sister); Kyle Richards (half-sister)
- Family: Hilton family

Kathleen Elizabeth Hilton (née Avanzino; born March 13, 1959) is an American socialite, fashion designer, actress, and television personality. She is the mother of socialite Paris Hilton and fashion designer Nicky Hilton and the half-sister of The Real Housewives of Beverly Hills stars Kim Richards and Kyle Richards. Since 2011, Hilton has also appeared on that series in regular guest and recurring appearances.

== Early life ==
Kathy Hilton was born on March 13, 1959, in Manhattan, New York City. She is the daughter of Kathleen Mary (née Dugan) and Larry Avanzino. Her father's family comes from Italian ancestry while her mother's side comes from Ireland. Hilton's parents later divorced, and her mother married Kenneth E. Richards (1917–1998), From this marriage Hilton has two maternal half-sisters: actresses Kim and Kyle Richards. Hilton also has five paternal half-siblings from her father's remarriage. She graduated from Montclair College Preparatory School in Los Angeles, where she became best friends with Michael Jackson. They remained close friends until his death in 2009.

== Television and film career ==
In 1968, Hilton began working as a child actress, retiring in 1979. Notable appearances include Nanny and the Professor, Bewitched, Family Affair, Happy Days, The Rockford Files, and film appearances include The Dark and On the Air Live with Captain Midnight. On the May 13, 2008, episode of The Young and the Restless, she made a cameo appearance as herself.

From 2003 to 2005, Hilton appeared on a few select episodes of The Simple Life (starring her daughter, Paris, and best friend Nicole Richie), mainly on premiere and finale episodes. Also in 2005, she hosted the reality show I Want To Be a Hilton on NBC. She also appeared on The World According to Paris (2011).

In June 2012, Hilton commented that she refuses to watch her half-sisters Kim and Kyle Richards on The Real Housewives of Beverly Hills, stating they caused her to "break down in tears" over watching their lives "fall apart". In October 2020, it was revealed that Hilton herself would appear as a "friend of the housewives" for the eleventh season of the same show. Her addition to the show was well-received by the cast and viewers, and she soon became a fan-favorite. In June 2021, Diane Cho of People called her "already a Real Housewives of Beverly Hills legend", writing: "Bravo's only mistake in casting Kathy Hilton on the show is that they didn't do it sooner." During the twelfth season, Hilton drew major media attention following the cast's trip to Aspen, Colorado. Co-stars, including Lisa Rinna, alleged that Hilton had a breakdown at a nightclub and made disparaging comments about the Real Housewives franchise. Hilton denied this. The dispute between Hilton and Rinna escalated throughout the Season 12 reunion and into the following year, with Hilton publicly stating she would not return to the show if Rinna remained part of the cast.

In June 2023, Hilton confirmed her departure from the series, after appearing in two seasons in a "friend of" capacity.

In January 2024, it was announced that Hilton would be making a special guest appearance, for the thirteenth season reunion of The Real Housewives of Beverly Hills.

In May 2024, it was announced that Hilton would be returning to The Real Housewives of Beverly Hills once again as a "friend of the housewives", for the show's fourteenth season.

== Business ventures ==
In the 1980s and early 1990s, Hilton operated her own gift and antiques store The Staircase on Sunset Plaza in Los Angeles. She debuted with 2002 merchandise sales on cable TV's QVC home shopping network. In 2007, she began selling a signature skincare line on HSN. Hilton launched a perfume called "My Secret" in 2008.

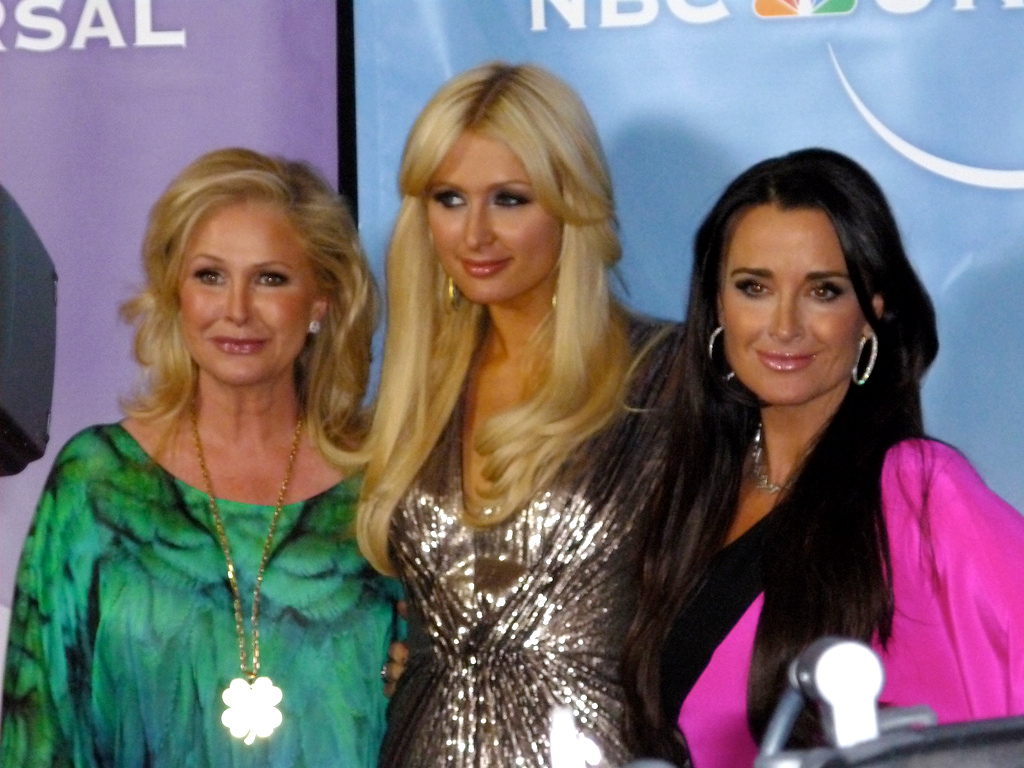
Left to right: Kathy Hilton, daughter Paris Hilton, half-sister Kyle Richards at NBC party, 2011

Hilton raised money for the Make-A-Wish Foundation in 2007, by asking celebrities to auction some of their belongings and donating the proceeds to them. In 2011, alongside her two daughters, she received an award from the Starlight Children's Foundation at its 'A Stellar Night' Gala in Century City, Los Angeles.

Since 2012, she has designed the Kathy Hilton Collection of party dresses, sold in four hundred stores worldwide, including Neiman Marcus, Saks Fifth Avenue and Nordstrom. In December 2020, Hilton and her daughters Paris and Nicky, modeled new Valentino 2021 resort collection in a photo series for Vogue.

In September 2021, Hilton appeared in Oscar de la Renta's New York Fashion Week campaign, hailing a taxi wearing the latest collection on a busy Manhattan street.

== Personal life ==
Hilton married Richard Hilton. They have four children: Paris Hilton (born 1981), Nicky Hilton (born 1983), Barron Nicholas Hilton II (born 1989) and Conrad Hughes Hilton III (born 1994). Hilton has eight grandchildren, three by Nicky three by Barron, and two by Paris.

The couple resides in Bel Air, Los Angeles. Hilton featured her home in Architectural Digest for Christmas 2021.

== Filmography ==
As an actress
| Year | Title | Role | Notes |
|---|---|---|---|
| 1970 | Nanny and the Professor | Melodie | Episode: "The Philosopher's Stone" |
| 1971 | Family Affair | Carol | Episode: "The Joiners" |
| 1971 | Marcus Welby, M.D. | Nicole | Episode: "A Portrait of Debbie" |
| 1971 | Bewitched | Robin Silverton | Episode: "TV or Not TV" |
| 1972 | Welcome Home, Johnny Bristol | Virginia | Television film; uncredited |
| 1974 | Sigmund and the Sea Monsters | Diane | Episode: "One Way Whammy to Tahiti" |
| 1976 | No Deposit, No Return | Girl at the Airport | Film; uncredited |
| 1977 | Happy Days | Gertie | Episode: "Fonzie, Rock Entrepreneur: Part 1" |
| 1977 | The Car | Girl Marching with Flag | Film; uncredited |
| 1978 | The Rockford Files | Judy | Episode: "The Prisoner of Rosemont Hall" |
| 1979 | The Dark | Shelly Warner | Film |
| 1979 | On the Air Live with Captain Midnight | Corvette Girl | Film |
| 1992 | Wishman | Woman at Football Game | Film; uncredited |
| 2020 | BSA Live | A star | Film |

As a television personality
| Year | Title | Role | Notes |
|---|---|---|---|
| 2003–2007 | The Simple Life | Herself | 6 episodes |
| 2005 | I Want to Be a Hilton | Host | |
| 2005 | The Miss Teen USA Pageant | Judge | Television special |
| 2008 | The Young and the Restless | Herself | Episodes: "Episode #1.8932" and "Episode #1.8892" |
| 2009 | Paris Hilton's British Best Friend | Herself | Episode: "Episode #1.1" |
| 2011 | The World According to Paris | Herself | 4 episodes |
| 2011–2015, 2020–present | The Real Housewives of Beverly Hills | Herself | 55 episodes; Guest (2011–2020, 2024), Friend of the housewives (seasons 11–12, 14–) |
| 2013–14 | Life with La Toya | Herself | 9 episodes |
| 2020 | This Is Paris | Herself | Documentary film |
| 2021 | Cooking with Paris | Herself | Guest |
| 2021–2023 | Paris in Love | Herself | Main Cast |
| 2025 | Denise Richards & Her Wild Things | Herself | Episode: “Yes, Chef!” |
