= Kyle Richards =

American actress and television personality (born 1969)

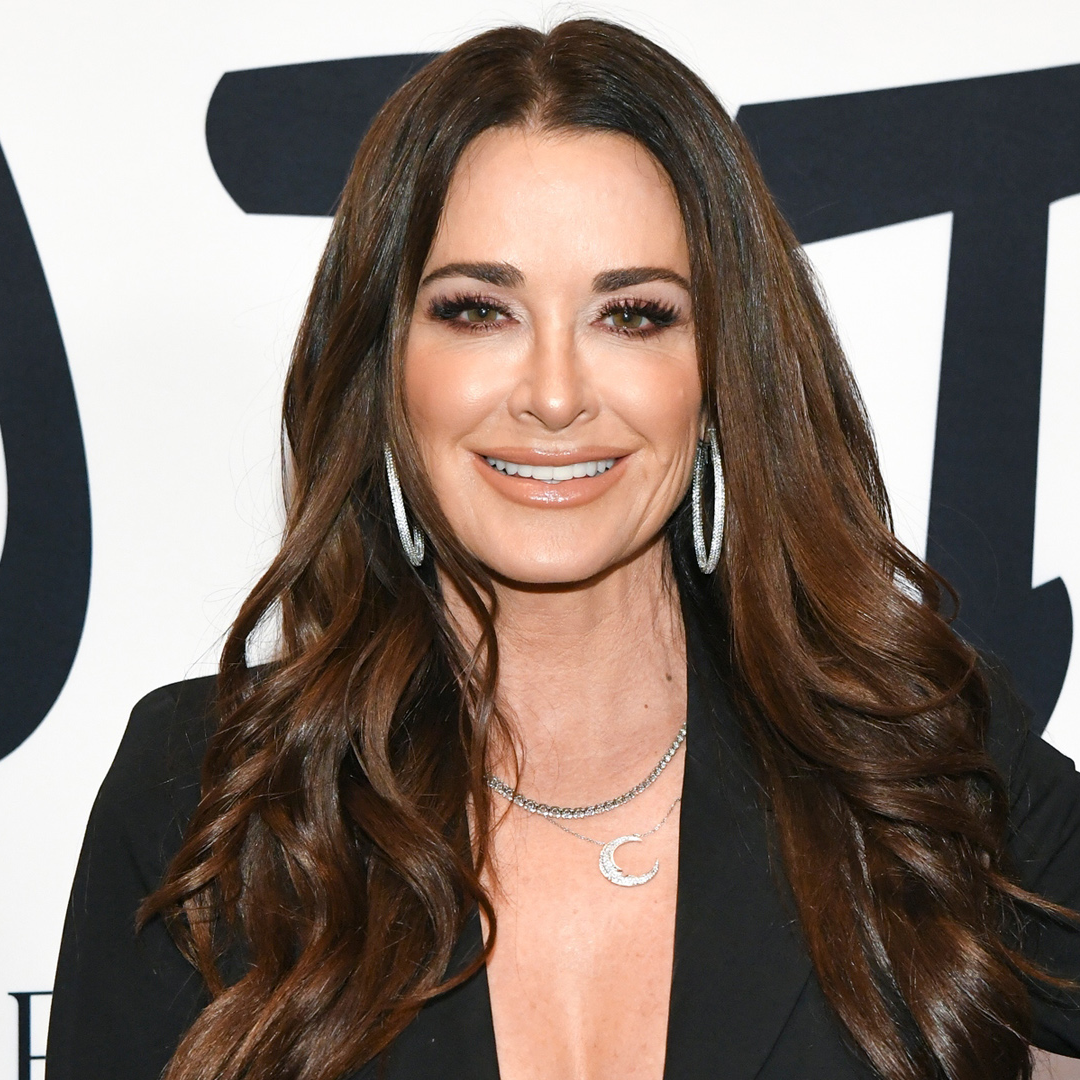
- Richards in 2022
- Born: Kyle Egan Richards; January 11, 1969 (age 57); Los Angeles, California, U.S.
- Education: Central Union High School
- Occupations: Actress; socialite; television personality
- Years active: 1974–present
- Known for: The Real Housewives of Beverly Hills; Halloween; The Watcher in the Woods
- Spouses: Guraish Aldjufrie (m. 1988; div. 1992) Mauricio Umansky (m. 1996; sep. 2023)
- Children: 4
- Relatives: Kim Richards (sister); Kathy Hilton (half-sister); Paris Hilton (niece); Nicky Hilton Rothschild (niece); Estella Sneider (mother-in-law)

Kyle Egan Richards (born January 11, 1969) is an American socialite, actress and television personality. Since 2010, she has appeared as a main cast member on The Real Housewives of Beverly Hills, and since 2020, she has been the last remaining original full time cast member on the show. She is also the longest-running consecutive housewife in franchise history.

Richards began her career as a child actress, appearing in a recurring role on Little House on the Prairie, and in several adventure and horror films, including Tobe Hooper's Eaten Alive (1976), The Car (1977), and Walt Disney’s The Watcher in the Woods (1980), as well as portraying Lindsey Wallace in John Carpenter's Halloween (1978) and later Halloween Kills (2021) and its sequel, Halloween Ends (2022). In 2017, she was a contestant on The New Celebrity Apprentice (also known as The Celebrity Apprentice 8).

== Early life ==
Richards was born on January 11, 1969, in the Hollywood neighborhood of Los Angeles, California. She is the daughter of Kathleen Mary Richards (née Dugan) and retired lieutenant colonel Kenneth Edwin Richards. She was named after Kyle Rote, a football player who played for the New York Giants.

Richards is the youngest of three sisters, including Kathy Hilton (born 1959), her older half-sister from her mother's first marriage to Lawrence Avanzino, and Kim Richards (born 1964). Richards also has three paternal half-siblings from her father's first marriage, all of whom were adults by the time Richards was born. Through Kathy, Richards is the aunt of socialites Paris Hilton and Nicky Hilton Rothschild.

Richards's parents divorced in 1972 after Kathleen discovered that Kenneth had been having an affair. Kathleen became the primary guardian of Richards and her sisters and kept the family estate in Bel Air. Despite not living with him, Richards maintained a close relationship with her father. Her mother remarried twice: to Jack Catain in 1980 and to Richard Fenton in 1999.

Richards described her childhood as "unconventional" due to her status as a child actor. Kathleen worked as her daughters' acting agent and was described as very strict. When Richards was born, her sister Kim was already working on Nanny and the Professor, and her sister Kathy was modeling and acting in commercials. Although Richards was shy as a child, Kathleen pushed her to become an actress like her sisters so that she could get over her shy nature and in the hopes that she wouldn't feel excluded. Even though she had positive relationships with both of her parents, Richards described feeling jealous while going to friends' houses as a child because they had "normal" families where the dad comes home from work and the mom cooks dinner.

Richards's upbringing was shaped by growing up in a household largely consisting of women. Richards described her childhood home as resembling a "big sorority house," stating that it was "filled with women." She was strongly influenced by her mother's assertive outlook, noting that her mother was "opinionated" and "strong" during a period when those traits were often viewed negatively in women (though Kathleen did not identify as a feminist).

Richards's mother emphasized the importance of financial independence early in Richards's life. Following her divorce from Kenneth, Kathleen did not have a checkbook and did not know how to manage her finances. To save her children from experiencing the same hardship, Kathleen opened a checking account for Richards at age 10 and allowed her to have her checks from television shows to teach her financial responsibility. Richards also prohibited her children from spending money on certain luxuries like nail appointments, insisting on keeping her daughters "down to earth."

In 1987, Richards graduated from Central Union High School in El Centro, California. She did not go to college.

== Career ==
=== Acting and scripted television ===
Richards began her acting career at age five in 1974, portraying Julia Faulker in a single-episode appearance in the television series Police Woman. She later appeared in 18 episodes of NBC's Western historical drama television series Little House on the Prairie as Alicia Sanderson Edwards. Her sister Kim Richards, also an actress, appeared in one episode of Little House on the Prairie the season before Kyle joined the cast. The sisters later played on-screen sisters in the 1977 thriller film The Car. Throughout the 1970s, Richards continued to appear on several television series, such as Flying High, Vega$, Fantasy Island, Time Express and Carter Country.

Richards gained wider recognition for her portrayal of Lindsey Wallace in the 1978 slasher film Halloween, alongside Jamie Lee Curtis. The film grossed $70 million at the worldwide box office and subsequently expanded into a Halloween franchise with thirteen sequel films. Following the success of Halloween, Richards landed the role of Ellie Curtis in the Disney supernatural horror film The Watcher in the Woods (1980) alongside Bette Davis. As a teenager, she starred as Lissy Preston in the fantasy sitcom Down to Earth (1984–1987), which ran for seven seasons.

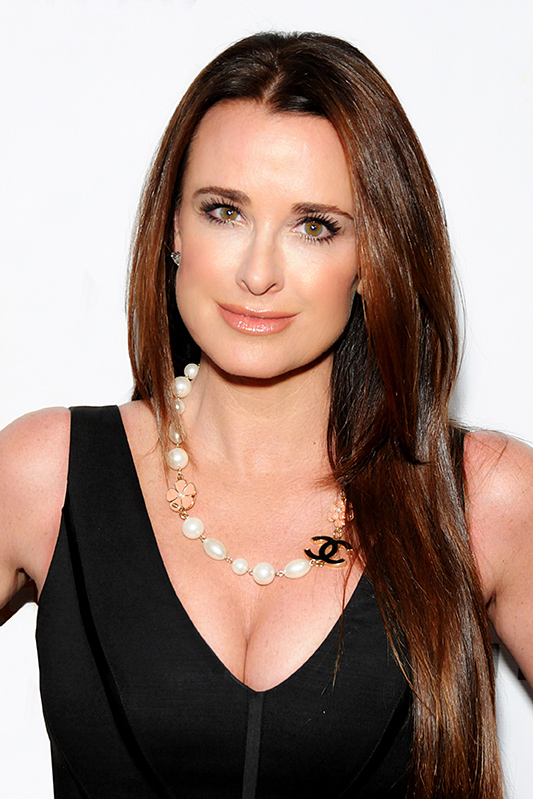
Richards in 2014.

As an adult, she acted as nurse Dori Kerns in 21 episodes of NBC's medical drama series ER (1998–2006), and the supporting role of Lisa in the 2006 comedy film National Lampoon's Pledge This!, which starred her niece Paris Hilton. In 2011, she played Tricia in Lifetime's television film Deadly Sibling Rivalry. In 2013, Richards portrayed modeling agent Casey McGraw in three episodes of NBC's soap opera Days of Our Lives. She acted as Housewife Heather in the 2014 comedy film The Hungover Games.

In 2018, Richards co-executive produced Paramount Network's comedy television series American Woman, which was inspired by her childhood in the 1970s. Richards described the series as a "love letter" to her mom, with Kathleen portrayed by actress Alicia Silverstone. The series was cancelled after one season due to declining ratings. On August 30, 2019, it was confirmed that Richards would reprise the role of Lindsey Wallace in the Halloween reprisal, Halloween Kills. Following a year delay due to the COVID-19 pandemic, Halloween Kills had its world premiere at the 78th Venice International Film Festival in September 2021 and was theatrically released in October by Universal Pictures. Richards would return as Wallace for the 2021 sequel, Halloween Ends, after her performance in Halloween Kills attracted positive reactions from fans.

In August 2021, Richards started filming the Christmas movie The Real Housewives of the North Pole alongside actress Betsy Brandt. The film, which aired on Peacock on December 9, 2021 features a variety of cameos from fellow cast members of The Real Housewives franchise, including her daughter Portia. Richards, a Christmas enthusiast, called filming for the movie a "dream come true." In May 2023, Richards had a guest role as socialite Missy Moritz in the Hulu sitcom How I Met Your Father. She played also Vivian Hayes in the romantic comedy film Beautiful Wedding (2024), released in limited theaters on January 24, 2024.

In May 2023, Richards had a guest role as socialite Missy Moritz in the Hulu sitcom How I Met Your Father. She played also Vivian Hayes in the romantic comedy film Beautiful Wedding, released in limited theaters on January 24, 2024. On April 3, 2023, Richards was announced as part of the cast of the Christmas romance film The Holiday Exchange alongside Rick Cosnett and Taylor Frey. The film, which was an LGBTQ reimagining of the 2006 movie The Holiday, features Richards in the role of overly involved mother Lola. The film premiered on October 1, 2024 on streaming services Amazon Prime Video and Peacock.

=== Reality television ===
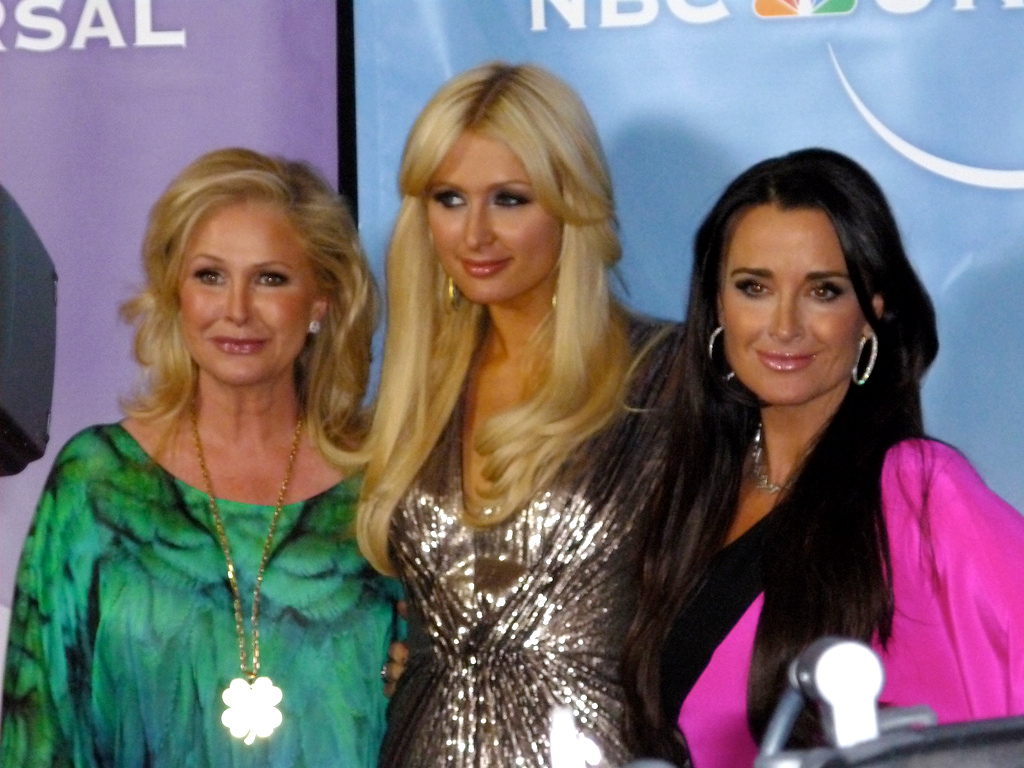
Left to right: half-sister Kathy Hilton, niece Paris Hilton and Kyle Richards at NBC party, February 2011

In 2010, Richards began appearing as a main cast member on Bravo's reality television show The Real Housewives of Beverly Hills, alongside her sister Kim. She has remained in a primary capacity since the show's inception, making her the longest-serving cast member in franchise history since 2020. In 2012, she was featured on the cover of The Hollywood Reporter along with other cast members from The Real Housewives franchise, including Vicki Gunvalson, Ramona Singer, Caroline Manzo and NeNe Leakes. After Kim departed the series in 2015, Richards was joined by her other sister Kathy Hilton, who joined the series in a recurring capacity in 2021 for the show's eleventh season. Richards's personal life and relationships with her sisters are a focal point for the series.

In 2017, Richards appeared as a contestant on The New Celebrity Apprentice and earned $25,000 for her charity of choice, Children's Hospital Los Angeles. She was the 5th contestant fired, finishing in 12th place. Richards was nominated for "Reality Star of 2019" award at the 2019 People's Choice Awards.

In 2021, Richards starred in The Real Housewives spin-off, The Real Housewives Ultimate Girls Trip, as the only representative from the Beverly Hills series. The season premiered in November on Peacock. The following year, she was nominated for the second time in the category "The Reality TV Star of 2022" at the People's Choice Awards, alongside Beverly Hills costar Garcelle Beauvais. Richards was one of the women included on Variety's "40 Most Powerful Women on Reality TV in 2023" list, with the magazine writing: "Richards has kept her head held high, and has become a household name, after having been a child actor. She's even resumed acting, having returned to the Halloween films she was featured in as a kid." In October 2024, Richards was chosen as one of Us Weekly's Reality Star of the Year.

== Business ventures ==
=== Fashion ===
Through a partnership with Alene Too, Richards previously owned a series of boutiques under the brand Kyle by Alene Too, which had locations in Beverly Hills (opened in 2012), in Southampton, New York (opened in 2015), and in Palm Beach, Florida. The boutique carried a variety of luxury labels, including Matthew Williamson, What Goes Around Comes Around, Vintage Chanel, Haute Hippie, Camilla, and Ramy Brook. In 2019, Richards announced that her partnership with Alene Too had ended and that her original boutique in Beverly Hills had closed, though she also revealed plans to open a new boutique offering items for men.

On February 25, 2014, Richards launched a clothing line for shopping network HSN. The eight-piece collection, inspired by her personal style, was priced between $69.90 and $199.90.

In 2019, Richards began a collaboration with designer Shahida Clayton. Richards and Clayton debuted their clothing collection titled "Kyle x Shahida" at New York Fashion Week on September 8, 2019. The entire cast of Real Housewives of Beverly Hills were featured as models in the show, including Erika Jayne, Lisa Rinna, Denise Richards, Teddi Mellencamp Arroyave, and Dorit Kemsley.

In November 2021, Richards opened a luxury resort and loungewear boutique Kyle x Shahida in Palm Desert, California.

List of fashion collections by Kyle Richards
Year	Title	Brand	Notes
2014	"Kyle by Kyle Richards"	HSN	Clothing collection for shopping network HSN.
2019	"Kyle x Shahida"	Kyle Richards; Shahida Clayton	Clothing collection by Richards and Shahida Clayton.

=== Memoir ===
On December 27, 2011, Richards released a memoir published by HarperOne about her life, family, and career. The book, titled Life Is Not a Reality Show: Keeping It Real with the Housewife Who Does It All, details Richards' views on relationships, family, and beauty. Richards described the book as a manual for her daughters and other women to learn confidence.

==== Other ventures ====
At 2024 Emmy Awards red carpet, actress Reese Witherspoon teased an upcoming project with an unnamed Real Housewife who she had recently sat beside on a plane. Richards identified herself as the mystery housewife and revealed that she was working with Witherspoon's company Hello Sunshine.

== Philanthropy ==
Richards is a longtime supporter of the Children's Hospital Los Angeles (CHLA). Richards and her husband, Mauricio Umansky, are listed as "First Families" of the CHLA, meaning they have donated at least $100,000 to the hospital. She held fundraisers for the CHLA in 2013 and 2019, with the 2019 fundraiser generating over $100,000 in donations for CHLA. In 2017, Richards competed to earn money for CHLA on The New Celebrity Apprentice, raising $25,000 through a donation from Kawasaki.

Inspired by her late mother Kathleen, who died from breast cancer in 2002, Richards partnered with her breast surgeon Dr. Heather Richardson in 2020 to promote Annual Mammogram Day (October 24) at the Bedford Breast Center in Beverly Hills. In 2024, Richards and country music singer Morgan Wade served as special guest speakers for Mission Plastico's annual gala, which aims to support individuals impacted by cancer.

== Personal life ==
Richards resides in Encino, Los Angeles. She has ten small tattoos, including two butterflies, a cowboy hat and a four-leaf clover.

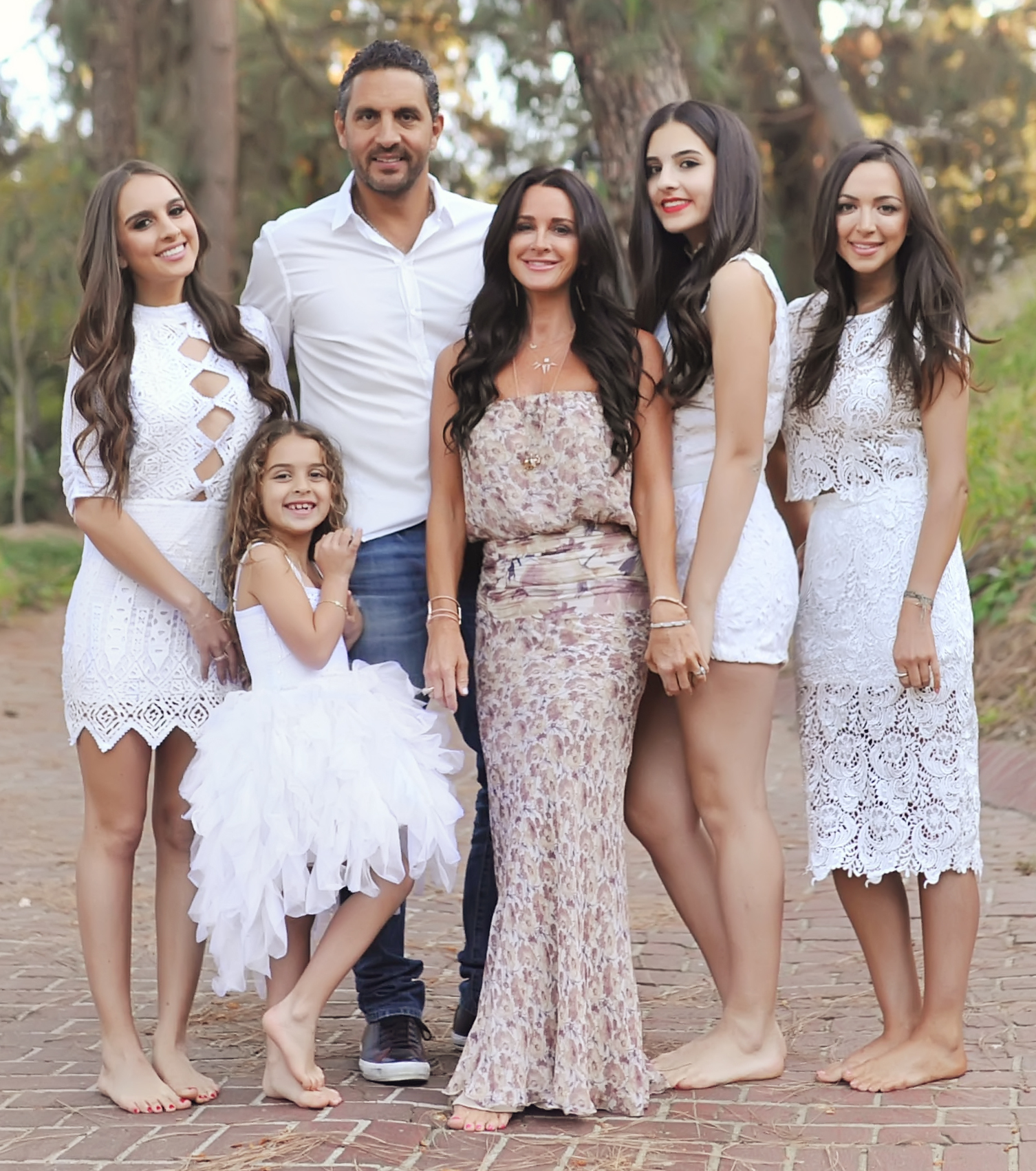
Richards with husband Mauricio and daughters Farrah, Alexia, Sophia and Portia (2015)

=== Family and relationships ===
In the 1980s, Richards dated actor C. Thomas Howell. Richards attributed their breakup to their youth. In 1988, at the age of 19, Richards married Guraish Aldjufrie, an Indonesian, while she was pregnant with their daughter Farrah Brittany (born October 31, 1988). Richards and Aldjufrie had met at a Tina Turner concert, where Richards lied about her age and hid her braces. They separated in 1990 and divorced two years later in 1992.

Richards met her second husband, Mauricio Umansky, a Los Angeles real estate agent, in 1994. The couple originally planned to wed in April, but it was moved up January 20, 1996, when Richards was four months pregnant. Their daughter, Alexia Simone, was born on June 18, 1996. The couple have two more daughters, Sophia Kylie (born January 18, 2000) and Portia Francesca (born March 1, 2008). Richards converted to Modern Orthodox Judaism when she married Umansky. She attends events at the Kabbalah Centre in Los Angeles.

On July 3, 2023, People magazine reported that Richards and Umansky had separated after 27 years of marriage. The couple later released a joint statement which denied they were divorcing, but admitted that they were going through a difficult period in their marriage. Subsequently, the couple separated and Umansky moved out of their home in Encino.

Upon her separation from Umansky, speculation regarding Richards' sexuality arose after Richards appeared as the love interest in country singer Morgan Wade's "Fall in Love With Me" music video. Richards never confirmed that she was romantically involved with Wade, but she revealed in a 2025 episode of Beverly Hills that she had been involved in a romantic relationship after her separation that ended because of "gossip", seemingly referencing Wade.

Richards has publicly feuded with both of her sisters, Kim Richards and Kathy Hilton, while filming The Real Housewives of Beverly Hills. However, she emphasized that she and her sisters "always come back together."

=== Burglary ===
In December 2017, Richards's family home in Encino, Los Angeles, was burglarized while she and her family were on vacation in Aspen, Colorado. Being that the family's alarm system was not armed, the burglar entered after breaking a window and stole jewelry, amongst other items, valued at over $1 million. Richards shared that it took her six months to feel safe in her own house again after the incident.

=== Health ===
Richards has been open about her struggles with mental health, including severe anxiety. Richards had her first panic attack at age 12 and has struggled with anxiety since. Richards privately battled anorexia nervosa beginning when she was 17 after feeling insecure during a television appearance. Before recovery, Richards reached a low of 99 pounds, often surviving only on V8 juice and almonds.

Richards is allergic to bees. In July 2021, she was rushed to the hospital after accidentally walking into a hive and being stung multiple times. Although she attempted to use an Epi-Pen, she was unable to do so successfully and urged fans to learn how to safely administer the medication in case of emergency.

In July 2022, following her separation from Mauricio Umansky and the suicide of her childhood best friend Lorene Shea, Richards stopped drinking alcohol and began to focus more on fitness and exercising. Richards stated that she stopped drinking because it was "no longer serving [her] physically, mentally, or spiritually." She discussed her fitness journey in a cover story for Us Weekly magazine in December 2023. Richards has maintained her sobriety since 2022 and celebrated over three years of sobriety in 2025.

== Filmography ==
=== Film and television ===
Year	Show	Role	Notes
1974	Police Woman	Julie Faulkner	Episode: "The Cradle Robbers"
1975	Escape to Witch Mountain	Young Tia Malone	Uncredited
1975–1982	Little House on the Prairie	Alicia Sanderson Edwards / Samantha	19 episodes
1976–1978	Police Story	Viki Jo Vero / Shannon / Nance	3 episodes
1976	Eaten Alive	Angie	
1977	A Circle of Children	Sarah	TV movie
1977	The Car	Debbie	
1977	The Father Knows Best Reunion	Ellen	TV movie
1977	Father Knows Best: Home for Christmas	Ellen	TV movie
1978	Halloween	Lindsey Wallace	
1978	The Wonderful World of Disney	Naomi	Episode: "The Million Dollar Dixie Deliverance"
1978	Flying High	Katie	Episode: "The Vanishing Point"
1979	Vega$	Julie Travis	Episode: "Kill Dan Tanna!"
1979	Fantasy Island	Rebecca	Episode: "Cornelius and Alfonse/The Choice"
1979	Time Express	Billie Jane Culper	Episode: "Rodeo/Cop"
1979	Carter Country	Gerry	4 episodes
1979	Friendships, Secrets, and Lies	Livia	TV movie
1979	Amateur Night at the Dixie Bar and Grill	Laurie Jean	TV movie
1980	Once Upon a Family	Liz Demerjian	TV movie
1980	The Watcher in the Woods	Ellie Curtis	
1980	Beulah Land	Young Sarah	TV mini-series
1981	Concrete Cowboys	Isobel	Episode #1.1
1981	Halloween II	Lindsey Wallace	Archival footage
1981	Hellinger's Law	Julie Braden	TV movie
1982	This is Kate Bennett ...	Jennifer Bennett	TV movie
1982	CHiPs	Jodi	Episode: "The Spaceman Made Me Do It"
1984–1987	Down to Earth	Elizabeth 'Lissy' Preston	106 episodes
1989	Curfew	Stephanie Davenport	Lead role
1990	Escape	Lydia	
1998	Nick Freno: Licensed Teacher	N/A	Episode: "Model Citizen"
1998	Love Boat: The Next Wave	Scheming Woman	Episode: "Captains Courageous"
1998–2006	ER	Nurse Dori Kerns	21 episodes
1999	Beverly Hills, 90210	Anna Murphy	Episode: "Bobbi Dearest"
1999	City Guys	Kate	Episode: "Miracle on 134th Street and Lexington Avenue"
2003	7th Heaven	Matt's Patient	Episode: "Life and Death: Part 1"
2006	Pledge This!	Lisa	
2011	Deadly Sibling Rivalry	Tricia	Lifetime television film
2012	CSI: Crime Scene Investigation	Ms. Young	Episode: "Play Dead"
2013	Days of Our Lives	Casey McGraw	3 episodes
2014	The Hungover Games	Heather	
2021	The Prince	Kyle Richards	Voice; episode: "Beverly Hills"
2021	The Real Housewives of the North Pole	Trish	Peacock original film
2021	Halloween Kills	Lindsey Wallace	
2022	Halloween Ends	Lindsey Wallace	
2023	How I Met Your Father	Missy Moritz	Episode: "Family Business"
2024	The Holiday Exchange	Lola Williams	
2024	Beautiful Wedding	Vivian Hayes	
2025	Wild Cards	Talia	1 episode
2026	The Lincoln Lawyer	Celeste Baker	3 episodes
2026	9-1-1: Nashville	Aubrey Hoffman	Episode: "Love to Death"

=== As herself ===
Year	Show	Notes
2003–2006	The Simple Life	3 episodes
2005	I Want To Be a Hilton	4 episodes
2010–present	The Real Housewives of Beverly Hills	Main cast; 325 episodes
2013	Vanderpump Rules	Episode: "Tooth or Consequences"
2013	Stars in Danger: The High Dive	Contestant
2013	Betty White's Off Their Rockers	Episode: "Episode #2.8"
2013, 2022	Whose Line Is It Anyway?	Episode: "Kyle Richards" and "Kyle Richards 2"
2014	The Doctors	Episode: "Compulsive Behaviors Triggered by Medication?/ Reality Star Reveals Secret Health Struggle/Dangers of Prescription Drugs"
2015–2024	Entertainment Tonight	Guest and guest co-host; 21 episodes
2015	Girlfriends' Guide to Divorce	Episode: "Rule #58: Avoid the Douchemobile"
2015–2016	FabLife	3 episodes
2016, 2021	Keeping Up with the Kardashians	Episode: "Lord of the Cougars" and "The End of An Era"
2017	The New Celebrity Apprentice	Contestant; 7 episodes
2019	Match Game	Episode: "Horatio Sanz/Sherri Shepherd/Thomas Lennon/ Ellie Kemper/ Kenan Thompson/Kyle Richards"
2020	Barkitecture	Episode: "Kyle Richards: Real Housedogs of Beverly Hills"
2020	Celebrity Family Feud	Episode: "Andy Cohen vs. Real Housewives of Beverly Hills and Kevin Nealon vs. Drew Carey"
2021, 2026	The Real Housewives Ultimate Girls Trip	Main cast; Seasons 1 and 5
2022–2024	Buying Beverly Hills	4 episodes
2024	We Are Family	Episode: "Who's Your Daddy?"

=== Music videos ===
Year	Title	Artist	Role
2014	"G.U.Y."	Lady Gaga	The Real Housewives of Beverly Hills Band
2023	"Fall in Love with Me"	Morgan Wade	Love interest

=== As producer ===
Year	Show	Role	Notes
2018	American Woman	Co-executive producer	11 episodes

== Awards and nominations ==
List of awards and nominations
Year	Ceremony	Award	Work	Result
1982	Academy of Science Fiction, Fantasy and Horror Films	Best Supporting Actress	The Watcher in the Woods	Nominated
1982	Young Artist Awards	Best Young Motion Picture Actress	The Watcher in the Woods	Nominated
1984	Young Artist Awards	Best Young Actress in a Movie Made for Television	This Is Kate Bennett...	Nominated
1985	Young Artist Awards	Best Young Actor/Actress in a Cable Series or Program	Down to Earth	Nominated
2019	People's Choice Awards	Favorite Reality TV Star	The Real Housewives of Beverly Hills	Nominated
2022	MTV Movie & TV Awards	Most Frightened Performance	Halloween Kills	Nominated
2022	People's Choice Awards	The Reality TV Star Of 2022	The Real Housewives of Beverly Hills	Nominated
2024	People's Choice Awards	The Reality TV Star of the Year	The Real Housewives of Beverly Hills	Nominated

== Bibliography ==
- Richards, Kyle (December 27, 2011). Life Is Not a Reality Show: Keeping It Real with the Housewife Who Does It All. New York, NY: HarperOne. ISBN 978-0062113481.
