= Garcelle Beauvais =

Haitian actress (born 1966)

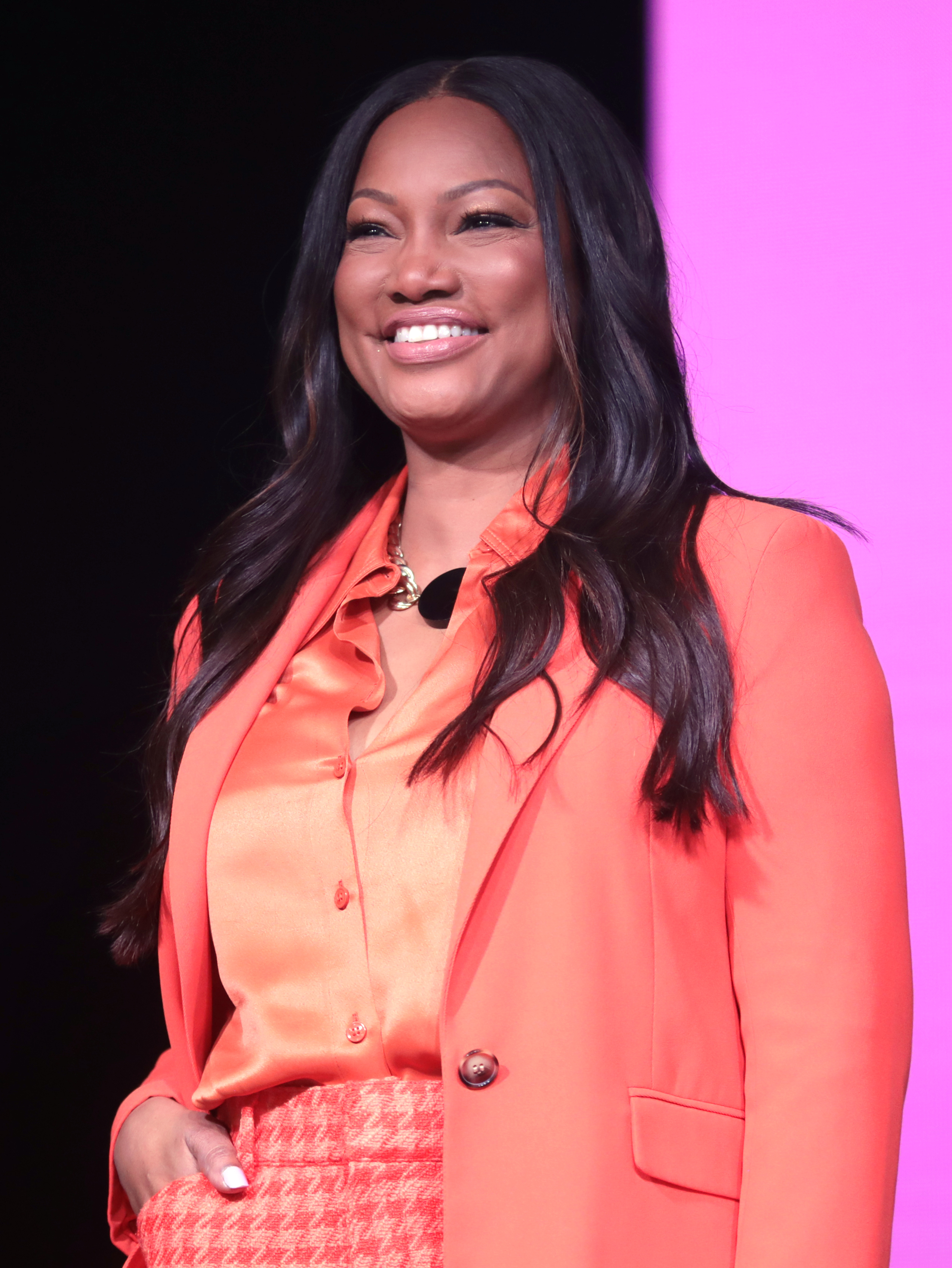
- Beauvais in April 2022
- Born: November 26, 1966 (age 59); Saint-Marc, Haiti
- Other name: Garcelle Beauvais-Nilon
- Occupations: Actress; television personality; interior designer; former model
- Years active: 1984–present
- Spouses: Daniel Saunders (m. 1991; div. 2000) Mike Nilon (m. 2001; div. 2011)
- Children: 3

Garcelle Beauvais (French pronunciation: [gaʁsɛl bovɛ], formerly Beauvais-Nilon; born November 26, 1966) is a Haitian actress and television personality. She is best known for her starring roles in the sitcom The Jamie Foxx Show and the crime drama series NYPD Blue. She also appeared in the films Coming to America (1988) and its sequel, Coming 2 America (2021), White House Down (2013), and Spider-Man: Homecoming (2017).

In 2020, Beauvais became a part of the main cast on the reality television series The Real Housewives of Beverly Hills, where she remained for five seasons before announcing her departure after season 14. She also co-hosted the syndicated daytime talk show The Real (2020–2022) alongside Adrienne Bailon, Loni Love, and Jeannie Mai for its final two seasons.

== Early life ==
Beauvais was born in Saint-Marc, Haiti, to Marie-Claire Beauvais, a nurse, and Axel Jean Pierre, a lawyer. Her parents divorced when she was three years old. At age seven, she moved with her mother and six older siblings to the United States and they settled in Peabody, Massachusetts, where she enrolled in elementary school. Upon her arrival to the United States, Beauvais originally only spoke French and Creole, but learned English from watching Sesame Street on television.

== Career ==
=== Modelling ===
Beauvais moved to Miami at 16 to pursue a career in modeling. After driving down from Massachusetts, Beauvais hoped to interview for a modelling agency without an appointment. She was approached at a red light while putting on lipstick by the very owner of the agency she sought to see. After modeling with this agency for about a year, Beauvais, at 17, went to New York City to pursue a career as a fashion model, after signing with the Ford Modeling Agency. She lived with Eileen Ford and later modeled with Irene Marie Models. She modeled print ads for Avon, Mary Kay, and Clairol and in catalogs for Lerner New York Clothing Line, Neiman Marcus, and Nordstrom and walked the runway for Calvin Klein and Isaac Mizrahi and also shot TV commercials for Burdines.

==== Magazine covers ====
Beauvais has appeared on the covers of numerous luxury lifestyle and fashion magazines such as CVLUX, Harper's Bazaar, Sheen Magazine, People's Health issue, VIVmag, Essence, Ebony, Jet, Playboy, Vibe and Hype Hair. In 2017, she was featured on five different magazine covers. In June 2019, she appeared in an editorial for Vogue Italia.

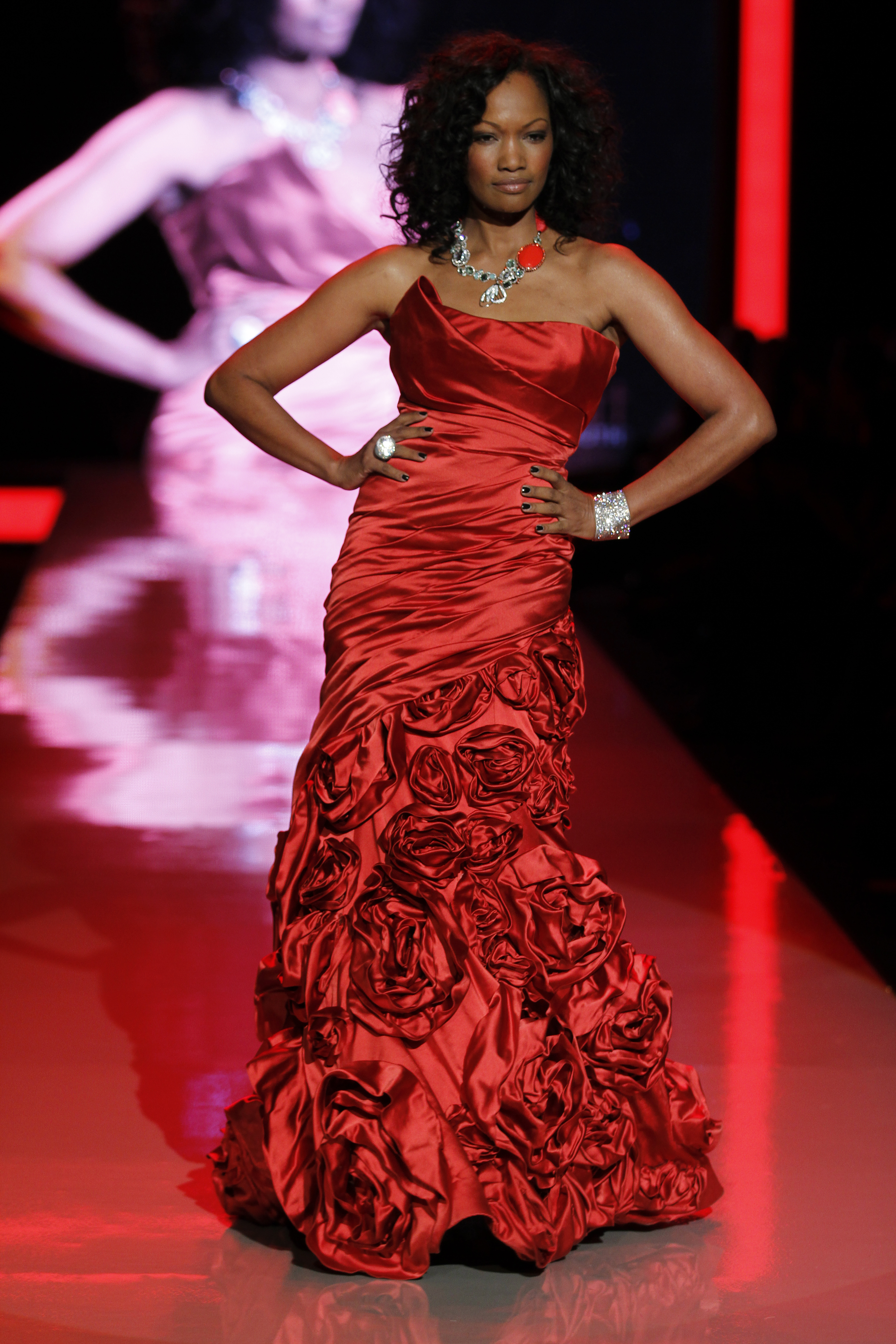
Beauvais walking the runway at 2011 The Heart Truth fashion show in New York City

=== Film and television ===
In 1984, she made her first television appearance in the crime drama series Miami Vice, in the episode "Give a Little, Take a Little". Beauvais portrayed a rose-bearer in the romantic comedy film Coming to America (1988) at age 21. In 1994, she rose to prominence as an actress for her portrayal of Cynthia Nichols in Aaron Spelling's prime time soap opera Models Inc. From 1996 to 2001, she co-starred in The Jamie Foxx Show as hotel employee Francesca "Fancy" Monroe and the love interest of Jamie Foxx's character, Jamie King.

From 2001 to 2004, she played Assistant District Attorney Valerie Heywood and the love interest of Detective Baldwin Jones, played by Henry Simmons, on NYPD Blue. In 2011 and 2012, Beauvais played Hanna Linden on the TNT law drama Franklin & Bash. In 2013, Beauvais portrayed the First Lady opposite Foxx as the President in the action thriller film White House Down. In 2017, she played the role of Doris Toomes, wife of Michael Keaton's character, Adrian Toomes, in Spider-Man: Homecoming. She starred in R. Kelly's music video for "Down Low (Nobody Has to Know)", as the wife of Ronald Isley and the lover of R. Kelly, delivering the title line as inducement for an affair. In 2001, after the Jamie Foxx Show ended its run, Beauvais appeared in Luther Vandross' music video, "Take You Out," playing Vandross' girlfriend. She also appeared on some episodes of Grimm as Henrietta. In 2016, Beauvais was named as one of the co-hosts of the syndicated infotainment discussion series Hollywood Today Live, after a month-long period of guest hosting the show.

Beauvais recurred as Veronica Garland, the Wicked Stepmother character from Cinderella, on the second season of the web television series Tell Me a Story. She also portrayed Dennis Quaid's love interest in the web television series Merry Happy Whatever. Beauvais joined the cast of The Real Housewives of Beverly Hills as the series' first black cast member during its tenth season, which premiered in April 2020.

Throughout her five seasons on The Real Housewives of Beverly Hills, Beauvais was outspoken about pay disparities within the cast on the franchise. She was regularly referred to as a grounded voice during a period of significant cast turnover across the franchise. During her last few seasons on the show, she formed a close friendship wth cast member Sutton Stracke though the two are no longer friends.

She began co-hosting the daytime talk show The Real for its seventh season in September 2020. Beauvais reprised her role as a rose bearer in the sequel to the romantic comedy film Coming to America, titled Coming 2 America.

In 2022, Beauvais signed a first-look development deal with NBCUniversal Television and Streaming, via her production company Garcelle Beauvais Productions. That same year, she was cast in the Hulu mystery thriller series The Other Black Girl, a television adaptation of the 2021 novel by Zakiya Dalila Harris. In addition, she starred in TV movies Caught in His Web and Black Girl Missing on Lifetime. In April 2024, Deadline announced that Beauvais will be executive producing three original films for Lifetime channel, saying: "I am so excited and grateful to continue my relationship with Lifetime because they immediately understood the importance of creating this new franchise with the Black Girl Missing movies. Having a network that stands by you and supports your mission gives me hope in humanity."

On August 4, 2024, Beauvais and Keltie Knight hosted the Miss USA 2024 beauty pageant.

In March 2025, Beauvais announced her departure from The Real Housewives of Beverly Hills, after five seasons.

=== Other ventures ===
In 2008, Beauvais launched a children's jewelry line called Petit Bijou. In 2013, she published a children's book titled I Am Mixed, which tells the story of twins exploring "the thoughts and emotions of being of mixed ethnicities." She hosts the weekly late-night talk show podcast Going to Bed with Garcelle, in which she discusses dating, sex, and relationships with guests.

Her memoir, Love Me As I Am: My Journey from Haiti to Hollywood to Happiness, co-written with Nicole E. Smith, was published by Amistad on April 12, 2022.

==== Interior design ====
On July 13, 2022, Beauvais launched a home collection, "Garcelle at Home" on HSN. The collection, inspired by her Haitian heritage, includes comforter sets, lamps, pillows, doormats and other accessories.

== Personal life ==
She was married to producer Daniel Saunders; their marriage ended in divorce. They have a son, Oliver Saunders, born in 1991. Beauvais married Mike Nilon, a talent agent with Creative Artists Agency, in May 2001. Their twin sons, Jax Joseph and Jaid Thomas Nilon, were born on October 18, 2007. They had dealt with treatment over five years for infertility. In April 2010, Beauvais publicly accused Nilon of infidelity after he admitted he had been having an affair for five years. Beauvais filed for divorce on May 10, 2010, seeking joint custody of their sons. On January 25, 2026, Beauvais experienced an LAPD swatting at her home in Los Angeles, and subsequently discussed it on 'Good Morning America', on January 30, 2026.

== Filmography ==
=== Film ===
Year	Title	Role	Notes
1986	Manhunter	Young Woman Housebuyer	
1988	Coming to America	Rose Bearer	
1994	Every Breath	Woman #2	
1999	Wild Wild West	Girl In Water Tower	
2001	Double Take	Chloe	
2002	Bad Company	Nicole	
2002	Second String	Larissa Fullerton	TV movie
2004	Barbershop 2: Back in Business	Loretta	
2005	American Gun	Sarah	
2007	I Know Who Killed Me	Agent Julie Bascome	
2007	The Cure	Trudie Ericson	TV movie
2009	Women in Trouble	Maggie	
2010	Eyes to See	Marie	Short
2012	David E. Talbert's Suddenly Single	Samantha Stone	Video
2012	Flight	Deana Coleman	
2013	White House Down	Alison Sawyer	
2013	And Then There Was You	Natalie Gilbert	
2014	Small Time	Linda	
2014	Girlfriends' Getaway	Vicki Holmes	TV movie
2015	Back to School Mom	Dee Riley	
2015	A Girl Like Grace	Lisa	
2015	Girlfriends Getaway 2	Vicki Holmes	TV movie
2016	7 Days	Herself	Short film
2017	You Get Me	Principal	
2017	Spider-Man: Homecoming	Doris Toomes	
2018	Lalo's House	Sister Francine	Short
2021	Coming 2 America	Grace	
2022	Caught in His Web	Detective Holland	TV movie
2023	Black Girl Missing	Cheryl	TV movie
2024	Terry McMillan Presents: Tempted by Love	Ava Denis	TV movie
2025	Taken at a Truck Stop: A Black Girl Missing Movie	Kai	TV movie
2026	Terry McMillan Presents: Tempted 2 Love	Ava Denis	TV movie

=== Television ===
Year	Title	Role	Notes
1984–85	Miami Vice	Waitress/Gabriella	Episode: "Give a Little, Take a Little" & "The Maze"
1986	The Cosby Show	Nurse	Episode: "An Early Spring"
1991–96	Family Matters	Various Roles	Guest Cast: Season 3 & 5–7
1992	Down the Shore	Liat	Episode: "Schwing Time"
1992	Dream On	Danica	Episode: "Red All Over"
1992–95	The Fresh Prince of Bel-Air	Various Roles	Guest Cast: Season 3 & 5–6
1993	Hangin' with Mr. Cooper	Keeler	Episode: "Boy Don't Leave"
1993	Where I Live	Terry	Episode: "Married... with Children"
1994	Dead at 21	Officer	Episode: "In Through the Out Door"
1994–95	Models Inc.	Cynthia Nichols	Main Cast
1995	The Wayans Bros.	Rachel	Episode: "Fatal Subtraction"
1996–01	The Jamie Foxx Show	Francesca "Fancy" Monroe	Main Cast
1999	Arli$	–	Episode: "The Cult of Celebrity"
2000	Opposite Sex	Ms. Maya Bradley	Recurring Cast
2001	Titans	Tina	Episode: "She Stoops to Conquer"
2001–04	NYPD Blue	A.D.A. Valerie Heywood	Main Cast: Season 8–11
2002	Journeys in Black	Herself	Episode: "Luther Vandross"
2003	I Love the '70s	Herself	Episode: "1970"
2003	The Bernie Mac Show	Vicki	Episode: "Bernie Mac Rope-a-Dope"
2004	Curb Your Enthusiasm	Renee	Episode: "The Surrogate"
2004	Life with Bonnie	Dr. Gamz	Episode: "Therabeautic"
2005	TV Land's Top Ten	Herself	Episode: "Sexiest Men"
2005	Eyes	Nora Gage	Main Cast
2006	10.5: Apocalypse	Natalie Warner	Episode: "Part 1 & 2"
2006	CSI: Miami	Katrina Iverson	Episode: "Death Pool 100"
2009	Maneater	Suzee Saunders	Episode: "Part 1 & 2"
2009	Crash	Connie	Episode: "Johnny Hit and Run Pauline"
2010	Harry Loves Lisa	Herself	Episode: "Belle Gray Party"
2010	Human Target	Vivian Cox	Episode: "Lockdown"
2011	State of Georgia	Gwen Dressel	Episode: "Foot in the Door"
2011–12	Franklin & Bash	Hanna Linden	Main Cast: Season 1–2
2012	The Exes	Kendra	Episode: "Shall We Dance"
2013	Kris	Herself/Co-Host	Episode: "Episode #1.8"
2013	Psych	Miranda Sherrod	Episode: "Dead Air"
2013	Arrested Development	Ophelia Love	Episode: "Off the Hook"
2013	Necessary Roughness	Lana Langer	Episode: "Swimming with Sharks"
2014	Playing House	Dr. Jay	Episode: "Let's Have a Baby"
2014	The Mentalist	Danitra Cass	Recurring Cast: Season 7
2015	The Meredith Vieira Show	Herself/Panelist	Episode: "Episode #1.173"
2015	The View	Herself/Guest Co-Host	Guest Co-Host: Season 18
2015	Grimm	Henrietta	Recurring Cast: Season 4
2015–17	Hollywood Today Live	Herself/Co-Host	Main Co-Host
2016	The Doctors	Herself/Guest Co-Host	Episode: "Episode #9.19"
2016	Hell's Kitchen	Herself/Restaurant Patron	Episode: "10 Chef's Compete"
2016	Window Warriors	Herself/Host	Main Host
2016–19	The Magicians	Our Lady Underground	Recurring Cast: Season 1, Guest: Season 2–4
2017–18	Chicago Med	Lyla Dempsey	Guest Cast: Season 2–3
2018	RuPaul's Drag Race All Stars	Herself/Guest Judge	Episode: "My Best Squirrelfriend's Dragsmaids Wedding Trip"
2018	Steve	Herself/Panelist	Recurring Panelist: Season 1
2018	The Arrangement	Mason	Recurring Cast: Season 2
2018	Power	Linda	Episode: "Are We On The Same Team?"
2019	Siren	Susan Bishop	Recurring Cast: Season 2
2019	Middle School Moguls	Mrs. Pierre (voice)	Recurring Cast
2019	Merry Happy Whatever	Nancy	Recurring Cast
2019–20	Tell Me a Story	Veronica Garland	Recurring Cast: Season 2
2020	Celebrity Family Feud	Herself	Episode: "Episode #7.2"
2020	Sugar Rush	Herself/Guest Judge	Episode: "Tropical Vacation"
2020	Carol's Second Act	Tina	Episode: "Plus One"
2020–22	The Real	Herself/Co-Host	Main Co-Host: Season 7–8
2020–25	The Real Housewives of Beverly Hills	Herself	Main Cast: Season 10–14
2021	Entertainment Tonight	Herself/Guest Co-Host	Episode: "Episode #40.148"
2021	25 Words or Less	Herself	Recurring Guest
2021	Beat Shazam	Herself/Celebrity Player	Episode: "Beat Shazam Celebrity Challenge!"
2021	The Prince	Herself (voice)	Episodes: "Beverly Hills" & "The Flummery Tart"
2022	Uncensored	Herself	Episode: "Garcelle Beauvais"
2023	Vanderpump Rules	Herself	Episode: "Mistress in Distress"
2023	See It Loud: The History of Black Television	Herself	Episode: "Laughing Out Loud"
2023	Hell's Kitchen	Herself/Restaurant Patron	Episode: "The Dream Begins"
2023	The Real Murders of Los Angeles	Herself/Narrator	Main Narrator
2023	Miracle Workers	Margaret	Episode: "Olympus"
2023	The Other Black Girl	Diana Gordon	Recurring Cast
2023–26	Survival of the Thickest	Natasha Karina	Recurring Cast: Season 1, Guest: Seasons 2 & 3
2024	Miss USA 2024	Herself/Host	Main Host
2025	Denise Richards & Her Wild Things	Herself	Episode: "The Family that Photoshoots Together..."

=== Music videos ===
Year	Song	Artist
1987	"Luv's Passion And You"	Chad
1996	"Down Low (Nobody Has to Know)"	R. Kelly featuring The Isley Brothers
1998	"Come with Me"	Puff Daddy featuring Jimmy Page
2001	"Take You Out" ”Can Heaven Wait”	Luther Vandross
2003	"Dance with My Father"	Luther Vandross

== Awards and nominations ==
List of awards and nominations received by Garcelle Beauvais
Year	Ceremony	Award	Work	Result
2019	Los Angeles Mission Gala	Legacy of Vision Award	Herself	Won
2021	Angels for Humanity	Distinguished Humanitarian Award	Herself	Won
2022	NAACP Image Awards	Outstanding Host in a Talk or News/Information (Series or Special) –Individual or Ensemble (shared with Adrienne Houghton, Loni Love and Jeannie Mai Jenkins)	The Real	Nominated
2022	People's Choice Awards	The Reality TV Star of 2022	The Real Housewives of Beverly Hills	Nominated
2022	TV Scoop Awards	Favorite Reality Star	The Real Housewives of Beverly Hills	Nominated
2023	MTV Movie & TV Awards	Best Reality On-Screen Team (shared with Sutton Stracke)	The Real Housewives of Beverly Hills	Nominated
2023	Black Reel TV Awards	Outstanding TV Movie/Limited Series (shared with Chet Fenster, Jason Egenberg, Robin Conly, Richard Foster, Gordon Gilbertson, Timothy O. Johnson, Kale Futterman, Stacy Mandelberg)	Black Girl Missing	Nominated
2023	Banff World Media Festival (Banff Rockies Gala)	The Inclusion Award	Herself	Won
2024	People's Choice Awards	The Reality TV Star of the Year	The Real Housewives of Beverly Hills	Nominated
2024	NAACP Image Awards	Outstanding Guest Performance	Survival of the Thickest	Nominated

== See also ==
- List of people from Massachusetts

== Bibliography ==
- Beauvais, Garcelle. Love Me As I Am: My Journey from Haiti to Hollywood to Happiness. Amistad (2022)
