= Crystal Kung Minkoff =

American television personality

- Born: Crystal Kung; February 4, 1983 (age 43); Los Angeles, California, U.S.
- Education: University of California, Irvine (BA)
- Occupation: Television personality • entrepreneur
- Years active: 2021–present
- Known for: The Real Housewives of Beverly Hills
- Spouse: Rob Minkoff (m. 2007)
- Children: 2
- Relatives: Jeffrey Kung (brother)
- Website: Real Coco

Crystal Kung Minkoff
- Simplified Chinese: 孔令华
Transcriptions
Standard Mandarin
- Hanyu Pinyin: Kǒng Línghuá

Crystal Kung Minkoff (née Kung; born February 4, 1983) is an American television personality, podcaster and entrepreneur. She is best known for appearing as a main cast member for three seasons on the reality television show The Real Housewives of Beverly Hills (2021–2024).

== Early life and education ==
Kung Minkoff was born in Northridge, Los Angeles to Chinese immigrant parents. Her father was an oral surgeon and her mother was a housewife. She has one brother, Jeffrey Kung, who is best known for being a singer and recording artist in China and Taiwan. Kung Minkoff claims to be a 76th generational descendant of Confucius. Kung Minkoff attained degrees in biology and history from the University of California, Irvine and completed a culinary education.

== Career ==
Kung Minkoff co-founded Real Coco with her brother, a company that sells coconut products. She is a former cast member of The Real Housewives of Beverly Hills, joining in 2021, and had starred in a main capacity for three seasons. She is the first Asian American cast member on the Beverly Hills franchise. In 2022, Kung Minkoff made a guest appearance as the voice actor of Charisma in Zootopia+, alongside fellow Real Housewives alum Porsha Williams. In 2023, she guest starred in History of the World, Part II. Kung Minkoff uses her social media platforms to share cooking videos and to advocate for the Alzheimer's Association and the Stop Asian Hate movement. In 2022, Kung Minkoff was paid an undisclosed sum by the Chinese government to promote the 2022 Beijing Winter Olympics on her social media.

In April 2024, it was confirmed that Kung Minkoff would not be returning to The Real Housewives of Beverly Hills, after three seasons. As of October 2024, Kung Minkoff is set to co-host the Humble Brag with Crystal and Cynthia podcast alongside Cynthia Bailey, focusing on topics related to pop culture, reality television and celebrities.

== Personal life ==
Kung Minkoff married American filmmaker Rob Minkoff in 2007, and they have two children. She has openly expressed her struggles with bulimia nervosa and body dysmorphia and advocates for increased awareness concerning eating disorders.
