= Sutton Stracke =

American television personality (born 1971)

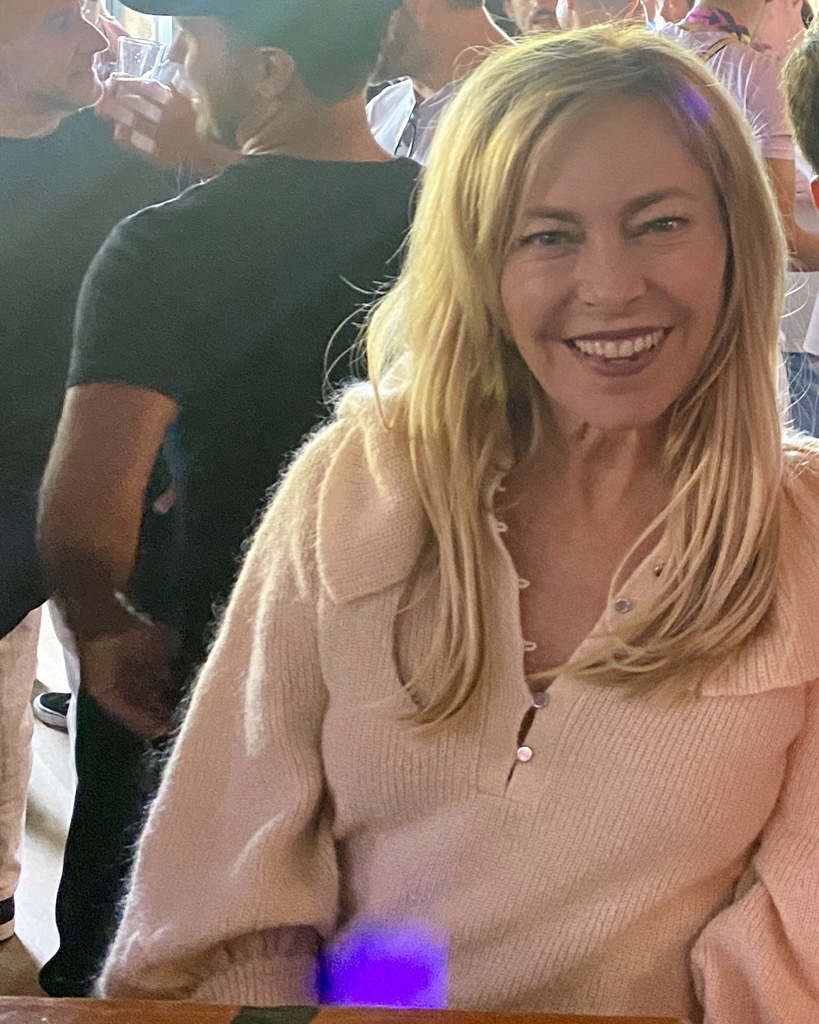
- Stracke in 2024
- Born: Sutton Thurman Brown; September 20, 1971 (age 54); Columbia, South Carolina, U.S.
- Education: Converse University (BA)
- Occupation: Socialite • businesswoman • television personality
- Years active: 2020–present
- Known for: The Real Housewives of Beverly Hills
- Spouse: Christian Stracke (m. 2000; div. 2016)
- Children: 3

Sutton Thurman Stracke (née Brown; born September 20, 1971) is an American socialite, businesswoman and television personality. She is known for appearing on The Real Housewives of Beverly Hills.

== Early life ==
Sutton Thurman Brown was born in Columbia, South Carolina and raised in Augusta, Georgia, where her father was an architect in private practice and her mother was a social worker for the Veterans Administration. After graduating from Converse University, a former women's college in Spartanburg, South Carolina in 1993, she moved to New York City to study dance in her early 20s. She served as associate director of development in charge of fundraising for the Cunningham Dance Foundation in New York, and was the executive director of the Augusta Ballet.

== Career ==
Stracke first joined the cast of The Real Housewives of Beverly Hills in season 10 in a recurring capacity, but was later upgraded to a full-time cast member from the eleventh season onwards. She was once ranked as one of the top party hosts in America, as part of The Salonniere 100 list. She owns a fashion boutique in West Hollywood, which is named The Sutton Concept. In June 2022, it was announced that Stracke would be making an appearance in the second season of the Syfy/USA show Chucky as herself. She made her first acting debut on episode 4 titled "Death on Denial", which aired on October 26, 2022. In July 2024, Stracke made a cameo appearance on an episode of the reality TV series, The Real Housewives of Orange County.

== Personal life ==
Stracke married PIMCO's Christian Stracke in 2000. They divorced in 2016. They share 3 children.

== Filmography ==
Year	Title	Role	Notes
2020–present	The Real Housewives of Beverly Hills	Herself	Friend: Season 10; Main cast: Season 11–
2020–present	Watch What Happens Live with Andy Cohen	Herself/Guest	12 episodes
2021	Paris in Love	Herself	Episode: “I Do, Don’t I? Part 1”
2022	Chucky	Herself	Episode: “Death On Denial”
2023	Alyssa’s Secret	Herself	Episode: “Nice Southern Ladies with Sutton Stracke”
2024	The Real Housewives of Orange County	Herself	Season 18: “Reunion Part 1”
2024	The Jennifer Hudson Show	Herself	Episode: Cast of “The Real Housewives of Beverly Hills”, Marvin Sapp
2025	Denise Richards & Her Wild Things	Herself	4 episodes
