= The Real Housewives of Beverly Hills season 6 =

The Real Housewives of Beverly Hills
- Season 6
- Cover used by iTunes (Left to right) Hadid, Vanderpump, Girardi, Richards, Rinna, Davidson and Edwards
- Starring: Kyle Richards; Lisa Vanderpump; Yolanda Hadid; Eileen Davidson; Lisa Rinna; Kathryn Edwards; Erika Girardi
- No. of episodes: 24

Release
- Original network: Bravo
- Original release: December 1, 2015 – May 10, 2016

Season chronology
- ← Previous; Season 5 Next → Season 7

The sixth season of The Real Housewives of Beverly Hills, an American reality television series, aired on Bravo from December 1, 2015 to May 10, 2016, and is primarily filmed in Beverly Hills, California.

The season focuses on the personal and professional lives of Kyle Richards, Lisa Vanderpump, Yolanda Hadid, Eileen Davidson, Lisa Rinna, Kathryn Edwards and Erika Girardi. The season consisted of 24 episodes.

This season marked the final appearance for Yolanda Hadid and only appearance for Kathryn Edwards, as well as the final guest appearance for Taylor Armstrong.

The season's executive producers are Andrew Hoegl, Barrie Bernstein, Lisa Shannon, Pam Healy and Andy Cohen.

== Production and crew ==
The Real Housewives of Beverly Hills was revealed to have been renewed for a sixth season following the announcement of Brandi Glanville's departure and filming had commenced in August 2015. The full cast, premiere date and trailer were announced on November 5, 2015.

The season premiere "Life's a Pitch" was aired on December 1, 2015, while the twentieth episode "Who Do You Believe?" served as the season finale, and was aired on April 12, 2016. It was followed by a three-part reunion that aired on April 19, April 26 and May 3, 2016 and a "Secrets Revealed" episode on May 10, 2016, which marked the conclusion of the season. Alex Baskin, Chris Cullen, Douglas Ross, Greg Stewart, Toni Gallagher, Dave Rupel and Andy Cohen are recognized as the series' executive producers; it is produced and distributed by Evolution Media.

A month prior to season six premiering, Vanderpump Rules After Show premiered on Bravo. The series is the second spin-off to The Real Housewives of Beverly Hills and also serves as the first spin-off the Vanderpump Rules. The series serves as a talk show which features discussions of the weekly episode of Vanderpump Rules with guests from the series who answer questions about their lives on and off the show. The talk show is hosted by Julie Goldman and Brandy Howard.

Also prior to the airing of season six, Bravo aired a special on November 22, 2016, titled The Real Housewives of Beverly Hills Uncensored. The special focused on the conception and drama of season one of the series. Along with all the season one housewives returning for interviews, it also featured interviews with the producers who revealed never-before-seen footage and talk about the behind-the-scenes drama.

== Cast and synopsis ==
=== Cast ===
Five of the seven wives from season four returned for the fifth installment. Shortly after season five, it was announced that both Kim Richards and Brandi Glanville would not be returning as full-time cast members in season six. Glanville announced on her podcast, Brandi Glanville Unfiltered, that after much consideration she would be leaving the series as a full-time cast member to focus on her businesses. Glanville went on to describe her four years on the show as a roller coaster and complimented the series. Glanville continued to participate in season six as a guest star and went on to have a prerecorded video-message shown during the reunion. The video wasn't received well, however host and Executive Producer, Andy Cohen defended the decision saying, "She was on tape for a minute-and-a-half or two minutes, they could respond or not respond, they all got the last word. Brandi didn't have the last word. So, you know, I feel fine about it." Shortly after season five concluded, it was reported that Kim had been let go from the series following an arrest at the Beverly Hills Hotel for three misdemeanors; resisting arrest, public intoxication and battery on an officer. Kim later appeared on a Dr. Phil special discussing her relapse and recent drunken arrest admitting that she drank while the series was airing and prior to the reunion. Her son revealed that she also takes pills and smokes pot. Following Kim's incidents, she entered rehab and got back on track with her sobriety but the following month, she was arrested again, this time for shoplifting at Target and was sentenced with 36 months of probation, 300 hours of community service and 52 Alcoholics Anonymous meetings. News of Kim's shoplifting arrest was addressed during the season. Kim appeared on season six throughout the season and attended the reunion.

With the departure of the two housewives, Kim Richards and Glanville, season six saw the introduction of two new housewives, Erika Girardi and Kathryn Edwards. In addition to the two new wives, Girardi and Edwards, former cast members Kim Richards, Camille Grammer, Taylor Armstrong, Adrienne Maloof, Faye Resnick and Glanville, alongside Bethenny Frankel from The Real Housewives of New York City would also make appearances in season six.

Edwards was born and raised in Wisconsin who quickly moved to Paris after being signed to Elite Model Management, shortly after graduating high school. Edwards went on to have a successful career as a model, appearing on several magazine covers as well as appearing in Nike’s first Just Do It campaign. Edwards also dabbled in to acting by appearing on Married... with Children, in the episode Dead Men Don't Do Aerobics. Edwards later moved to Los Angeles where she then married NFL superstar Marcus Allen, at O. J. Simpson's home. After eight years, the pair got divorced, however several years later, Edwards married another NFL superstar, Donnie Edwards. Edwards and her husband live happily in Brentwood where they involve themselves in many charities and organizations such as The Greatest Generations Foundation, which is a non-profit dedicated to supporting America's war veterans. The pair often like to travel and spend time in Donnie's hometown of San Diego, where they own their second home. Edwards is also a lover of animals, travelling abroad and expensive shoes.

Girardi was born and raised in Atlanta, Georgia where she attended North Atlanta High School for the Performing Arts. At the age of eighteen, she left her hometown and headed for New York City with dreams of pursuing her passions for singing and dancing, later appearing in several film and television productions such as High Incident, Lowball and Alchemy. Two years after arriving in New York, Girardi married and had a son, however, she later divorced the father and move to Los Angeles and waited tables. Whilst waiting table, Thomas Girardi, a renowned attorney, frequented her workplace and the two fell in love and later got married. The couple reside in a five-acre 1920s estate, in Pasadena. During her marriage, Girardi developed the stage name, Erika Jayne. With the new image she had developed, Girardi went on to have a smash debut on the music scene in 2007 with her first single Rollercoaster, which went to number one on the U.S. Billboard Hot Dance Club Play chart. With her new found musical success, Girardi has gone on to have a successful music career with a total of eight number one Billboard singles. She has also toured and has collaborated with Flo Rida and Maino. Girardi is also a huge supporter of the LGBT community, and in 2015, she was honored as the In News Ally Entertainer in the LGBT Ally Awards.

=== Synopsis ===
The Real Housewives of Beverly Hills' season six begins with Lisa Vanderpump reveals that the Los Angeles Dodgers have asked her to throw the first pitch, for the LGBT game. Vanderpump invites A. J. Ellis to her home to practice throwing. Later, With her husband and Giggy's support, she attends the game and successfully throws the first pitch. Lisa Rinna meets with a producer of Oprah: Where Are They Now? at her house to film for her future appearance on the show. Eileen Davidson continues to work and attends the set of Young and the Restless where she practices her lines and gets her makeup done preparation to begin filming. Yolanda Foster continues to suffer with Lyme disease, and reveals she has been staying in her and her husband's condo as it's closer to her doctors. Foster opens up about the many procedures she has tried to help her healing process and the places she has visited for them. Despite dealing with her illness, Foster relishes in her children's achievements. Foster is visited by her close friend, Angie Simpson. Simpson is the mother to Cody Simpson, who is Foster's daughter, Gigi's ex-boyfriend. Kyle Richards meets Vanderpump for lunch after a day of shopping. The pair discuss the rift between Vanderpump and Foster and Foster's illness, saying they don't quite understand what exactly is wrong with her. Richards reveals she is working with Warner Bros. on a script about her life growing up. Richards reveals that her sister, Kathy Hilton, doesn't support the script. Richards continues to discuss with Vanderpump that she hasn't spoke to her other sister, and former cast member on the show, since last years reunion as well as discussing Kim's drunken arrest. Rinna calls Foster inviting her to her dinner than she plans to host, and Foster invites Simpson along. Foster reals that her husband, David Foster, is busy working which includes travelling. Foster opens up with her struggle revealing that if it wasn't for her kids she would lose her will to live. Davidson decides to redecorate her home by removing some of the clutter, inspired by Brandi Glanville's comments from the year prior. She opens up about the recent passing of her father-in-law, Dick Van Patten. The ladies arrive to Rinna's dinner and comments begin on Foster's lack of makeup. Richards speaks on her upcoming trip to Tuscany and looks forward to spending some time with Vanderpump and her husband, who are also going on the trip. After a coughing fit and sudden hit of fatigue, Foster and Simpson depart the party midway through. After their departure, discussions of Foster's health begins with Vanderpump's husband, Ken Todd, remarks on how ill and terrible she looked. Richards continues with comparing the difference between Foster's photos online and how she looked in person, while Rinna felt touched that she even attended.

Kathryn Edwards officially made her entrance to the series in episode eight at a charity event hosted by Vanderpump and Rinna. Soon after Edwards arrival, Rinna brings up the O. J. Simpson murder case due to Edwards' history with O. J. Simpson. Edwards reveals she has history with Faye Resnick, due to Resnick mentioning her and her ex-husband in a book she had published decades ago. At Richards' BBQ, she confronts Resnick, however, there is very little resolution when Resnick wants to leave it in the past. Edwards finds herself in a heated discussion with Richards after she speaks badly about Resnick, who is Richards' close friend. Edwards hosts a lunch for the ladies at her San Diego home and after a deep discussion about alcoholism, Edwards opens up about her painful past. Edwards later receives a makeover from Girardi. Edwards visits Girardi at her home and the two bond. Girardi reveals her opinion on Vanderpump, and shortly after the lunch, Edwards takes the information to Vanderpump. After getting a hearing test, Edwards receives some good news that she will be able to hear again.

Girardi, who made her debut to the series in episode three, visits her close friend, Foster, who gets a medical treatment. Girardi reveals her double life with her stage name, Erika Jayne. Girardi enjoys a day in Malibu visiting Foster and her husband David. Girardi meets the other ladies and shocks them with news of her own plane, leaving them intrigued. After news of people question Foster's health, she questions the integrity of their friendships. During a dinner at the home of Bethenny Frankel, a friend of Richards and housewife featured on Real Housewives of New York City, Girardi finds herself in a debate with Frankel over branding after Frankel watches her music video. Girardi flies to Cleveland on her private jet to visit Foster after her surgery. Girardi relays the discussion Vanderpump and Richards had at the BBQ to Foster. Girardi later heads to San Diego to perform at a gay club and has invited the women along. Girardi later bonds with Edwards by giving her a glamorous, "Erika Jayne" style makeover. Later at her BBQ, Girardi gets into an argument with Rinna over who really brought up the words "Munchausen." Girardi invites Edwards to her home to bond and discusses her opinions on Vanderpump, but later, Edwards informs Vanderpump of what she has said. Vanderpump confronts Girardi over what she has heard; Girardi is then wary of Edwards and doesn't trust her after learning that she has relayed the information to Vanderpump.

Vanderpump enjoys Tuscany with her husband and Richards. During dinner with Richards, she is confused by some of Richards' family being uninvited, re-invited and not invited to Nicky Hilton's wedding. Vanderpump heads to Columbus, Ohio with Rinna to find the perfect mini-horse for her husband's birthday. Later, Vanderpump hosts a white party at her home, Villa Rosa, for Ken's birthday. Taylor Armstrong attends. Vanderpump invites Richards, Davidson and Rinna to her house and before Davidson arrives, Rinna reveals her opinion on Foster's health, leaving Vanderpump feeling uncomfortable. Vanderpump visits the veterinarian emergency room for her swan. Vanderpump heads to the Hamptons to celebrate being on the cover of Bella Magazine. Vanderpump has arranged a place to say for the women, but is offended when the ladies, excluding Girardi, organize somewhere else to stay. Vanderpump is confused after Davidson reveals she was offended by her curiosity and questioning of Davidson's marriage. Vanderpump tours a place her husband wants to turn into a new restaurant, and is surprised to learn it's currently a sex shop. Later at Richard's BBQ, Vanderpump finds herself in a discussion with Richards about Foster's children and their health. After Richard' reveals Foster said they suffer from the same illness, Vanderpump says that their father, Mohamed Hadid, has said they're fine. During a lunch with Foster and Richards, Vanderpump is accused of not having Foster's back after Foster calls them both out on their discussion about Foster's health. Foster pulls out her children's medical records and request Vanderpump to read them but she declines, saying she doesn't need proof. Edwards tells Vanderpump that Girardi thinks she is "spinning a web." Vanderpump confronts Girardi on what she said, and Girardi completely owns up to it. Vanderpump is informed by Rinna that Davidson thinks she's manipulative and later the three discuss it. During the trip to Dubai, Rinna accuses Vanderpump of rewriting the history of who brought up the discussion of Foster's health and of trying to drag Richards in to it. However, Richards soon contradicts Vanderpump's story, even after saying they're friends and have moved on from it. Following the argument with Rinna, Vanderpump gets in to another heated discussion with Davidson, who again brings up Vanderpump's inquiries into her marriage. Vanderpump claims Davidson is always having a go at her, despite her previous apology. On top of the Burj Khalifa, Vanderpump gives Davidson what she wants and apologizes.

Richards enjoys Tuscany and takes in the country side while driving around in a luxury car. She later reveals she has been re-invited to her niece Nicky Hilton's wedding. However, some of Richards' daughters and husband aren't invited at all. After arriving home from Tuscany, Richards learns of bad news about her sister, Kim. During a day at Vanderpump's house, Richards is taken aback by Rinna's opinion on Foster's health, which leaves her Googling what exactly the word "Munchausen" means after she stated that her youngest daughter Portia Umansky had stopped breathing and almost died after birth on March 1, 2008 that led to Kyle monitoring Portia's health nightly. Richards continues to be devastated by ongoing news about Kim. While in the Hamptons, Richard's opens her pop-up shop and hosts a book signing for Frankel. During her BBQ, Richards' talks with Vanderpump about Foster's previous claim that her children also have Lyme Disease. Vanderpump reveals that their father says they're fine. At lunch with Foster and Vanderpump, Foster contronts her about her conversation with Vanderpump at the BBQ. At Edwards' home in San Diego, Richards is conflicted when Rinna reveals her opinions on Richards' sister, Kim. Struggling with her own issues with her sister, Richards later meets up with friend and former housewife, Adrienne Maloof, to discuss her concerns. Richards then sits down with her sister, Kim, after not talking for nine months, and the two have an emotional talk. On the trip to Dubai, Richards' is brought into the discussion between Rinna and Vanderpump about who initially brought up Munchausen. Despite admitting to being present, they both deny being a part of the talk that brought up the "M" word.

Davidson visits Foster and is in awe of her health. Davidson struggles with getting her husband to help her balance her duties as a mother and her work. Davidson arrives to Vanderpump's house in the middle of discussion between Vanderpump, Richards, and Rinna on Foster's health. Rinna reveals she feels guilty and Davidson suggests she talks to Foster about it. During a lunch with some of the ladies, including Foster, Davidson references Rinna's prior comments in a mix-up of who said what. In the Hamptons, Davidson feels she was interrogated by Vanderpump on her affair with her husband. On the last night in the Hamptons, Davidson opens up about her history and previously being in an abusive relationship. Davidson heads to Italy here she spreads her sister's ashes. Davidson is disturbed to learn from Rinna that Vanderpump and Richards were the ones that initially suggested Foster may have Munchausen. Davidson confronts Vanderpump over being manipulative. In Dubai, Davidson brings up Vanderpump's interrogation and tries to explain to her why it was an issue. Davidson believes that Vanderpump's initial apology wasn't sincere. Vanderpump later apologizes to Davidson on top of the Burj Khalifa.

Rinna, after a visit to Foster, is shocked by Foster's health and how many medications she has to take. Rinna heads to Ohio with Vanderpump to find a miniature horse for Ken. Later at Ken's birthday, Rinna engages in a conversation with Armstrong about Foster and the contradicting images on her Instagram. Armstrong reveals she thinks Foster has been misdiagnosed. During a visit to Vanderpump's house, Rinna says to Richards and Vanderpump that she believes Foster suffers from Munchausen syndrome, which leaves the other ladies confused and shocked. Shortly after the announcement, Davidson arrives and Rinna states she feels guilty for discussing Foster's health in her absence. Rinna feels uncomfortable after watching Girardi's music video, believing it's too sexual. At a charity hosted by Rinna and Vanderpump, Rinna runs into an old friend of Edwards and discusses her history. Rinna meets Foster to discuss the Munchausen conversation, where she is honest and reveals she had entertained questions of Foster's health. In San Diego, Rinna is accused of throwing Vanderpump and Richards' under the bus after Girardi reveals their conversation to Foster. Rinna embarks on a mission to clear her name by untangling who said what to Foster. At Edwards' San Diego home, Rinna reveals her dislike of Richards' sister Kim from the events that occurred the previous year. She calls Kim's recent actions "disgusting" which upset Richards. Rinna later defends herself from Foster at Girardi's BBQ over previous claims about her health. Rinna is accused of labeling people. Rinna is shocked to learn that Foster is hanging out with Glanville and Kim, and says to Davidson that Vanderpump and Richards were the ones that encouraged her to bring up Munchausen. Rinna also reveals that she thinks Foster is scary and manipulative. Rinna discusses her trust issues with Foster and questions her friendship to Girardi. Rinna also admits to Vanderpump that Davidson think she's manipulative. During the trip to Dubai, Rinna expresses her doubts about Foster's health. Also during the Dubai trip, Rinna accuses Vanderpump of rewriting the truth and Vanderpump drags Richards in it. The two argue about who really brought up Munchausen and Vanderpump's many attempts to throw Richards under the bus. After not seeing Kim for over a year, Rinna comes face to face with her and the two talk in an attempt to move forward.

Foster continues to take measures to improve her health, starting by focusing on her teeth. Later, Foster has Davidson and Rinna over and shows them all her medications, which leaves them both stunned by her condition. Foster gets a Vitamin C drip with support from Girardi. Foster has Girardi over to her house. During a group lunch, Foster addresses Armstrong's previous comments about her illness. Davidson reveals to Foster that Rinna has also discussed Foster's health and that she feels guilty about doing so. Later, Foster opens up about her children, claiming that Bella and Anwar also suffer from Lyme disease Foster heads to Cleveland to undergo surgery to remove her breast implants. While Foster is in recovery, Girardi arrives to support her. Foster meets with Rinna, who addresses previous discussions she has had about Foster's health. Foster explains she posted her photos online to raise awareness about her condition. Foster is in shock when Rinna reveals that someone has claimed Foster has Munchausen and is faking being sick. Foster attends a session of cryotherapy with Vanderpump and Richards and at lunch afterwards, Foster confront the two about talking about her kids, but throws Rinna under the bus in the process. Foster pulls out Bella and Anwar's medical records to prove them wrong. At Girardi's BBQ, Foster gets into an argument with Rinna, still feeling hurt by her previous claims and compares Rinna to a previous housewife, Brandi Glanville. Foster continues to condemn Rinna by accusing her of labeling people. Needing a break from the ladies, stays home from the Dubai trip. While the other housewives are in Dubai, Foster has a picnic with Kim and Glanville. News begins to circulate on Foster's divorce and she opens up to Girardi about her marriage for the first time. Foster changes her name back to Hadid and begins going by Yolanda Hadid again.

== Episodes ==
The Real Housewives of Beverly Hills season 6 episodes
No. overall	No. in season	Title	Original release date	U.S. viewers (millions)
110	1	"Life's a Pitch"	December 1, 2015	1.91
Kyle deals with troubled sister Kim in the Season 6 opener. Also: Eileen suffers a loss in her family; Lisa Vanderpump is slated to throw out a first pitch at Dodger Stadium; and Yolanda copes with a health issue.
111	2	"Ciao, Tuscany!"	December 8, 2015	1.77
Family problems interrupt Kyle and Lisa Vanderpump's fabulous time in Italy. In Beverly Hills, Yolanda takes drastic steps to improve her health as Eileen and Lisa Rinna are shocked by her condition.
112	3	"Horsing Around"	December 15, 2015	1.53
Kyle receives bad news about Kim after returning from her European vacation. Also: Lisa Rinna and Lisa Vanderpump jet off to find a perfect mini-horse for a birthday present; Eileen tries to juggle motherhood and her career; Ken's birthday bash is held.
113	4	"The M Word"	December 22, 2015	1.59
Kyle reflects on her acting career when her daughter expresses an interest in the craft; Eileen has an argument over the proper time to have an argument; Lisa Vanderpump showcases mini-horses she bought; a suggestion about Yolanda's health creates drama.
114	5	"Will Power"	December 29, 2015	1.78
Yolanda's friend intrigues the ladies with her short skirt and flashy ring. Meanwhile, Lisa pays an emergency visit to the veterinarian's office; a comment about Yolanda's illness creates drama; and Yolanda gives startling news to her children.
115	6	"Hamptons, 90210"	January 5, 2016	1.78
The ladies go to the Hamptons for Lisa's magazine cover party. The ladies offend Lisa V. when they make separate arrangements without letting Lisa know. Meanwhile Yolanda goes to Cleveland Clinic to get an explant surgery due to silicone implants leaking into her chest which may have been causing her to feel so ill. Kyle finds out about Kim's run in with the law.
116	7	"Pretty Mess"	January 12, 2016	1.81
The ladies attend a dinner. Lisa V. grills Eileen about the circumstances to her marriage which makes Eileen uncomfortable. Bethenny Frankel from Real Housewives of New York City appears in the episode as a friend of Kyle's. She meets Erika Girardi, who flew in to the Hamptons after a Chicago Pride event.
117	8	"Going Deep"	January 19, 2016	1.85
The ladies confide some of their secrets to each other - their "deeper side." Eileen makes a confession about her past relationships. Kathryn Edward's first appearance in the series.
118	9	"Busted BBQ"	January 26, 2016	1.82
Lisa Vanderpump takes a tour of the space Ken wants for a new restaurant. Meanwhile, Eileen flies to Italy to spread her sister's ashes; and Kyle hosts a barbecue, where dramas sizzle over Yolanda's claims. A 20-year grudge rears its ugly head between Kathryn and Faye.
119	10	"Backwards in Heels"	February 2, 2016	1.90
A joint anniversary bash with a burlesque theme is planned by Kyle and Lisa Vanderpump, but drama spikes when it's discovered that Faye is on Kyle's guest list. Also, Lisa Rinna continues to feel guilty about a past discussion.
120	11	"Please Welcome Erika Jayne!"	February 9, 2016	1.81
Kyle and Lisa Vanderpump try cryotherapy with Yolanda. Erika performs in a gay club in San Diego with the other ladies invited. After being accused of throwing Kyle and Lisa Vanderpump under the bus, Lisa Rinna tries to find out who said what to Yolanda.
121	12	"Hearing Problems"	February 16, 2016	1.90
The wives attend a lunch at Kathryn's home, but tensions arise Kim is mentioned. Kathryn reveals her traumatic past. Kyle meets up with Adrienne who has some advice for dealing with Kim. Erika hosts an outdoor pool barbecue, but the talk of Munchhausen returns and drama ensues.
122	13	"Spinning a Web"	February 23, 2016	1.79
The women partake in a workout class to raise money for charity followed by a lunch full of drama. Yolanda confronts Kyle for gossiping, then confronts Lisa Vanderpump for talking about her children's health. Kathryn visits Erika at her home in an attempt to gain her trust before going to Lisa Vanderpump's to reveal what Erika said about her.
123	14	"Not Easy to Love"	March 1, 2016	1.67
Yolanda hosts a dinner party, Eileen is upset because Lisa Rinna won't be honest about her feelings, Erika is wary of Kathryn because she betrayed her trust and Kyle and Kim come face to face.
124	15	"Objection, Your Honor"	March 8, 2016	1.66
Erika introduces her husband to the ladies at her dinner party. At a hearing test, Kathryn hears some positive news. Yolanda receives criticism for hanging out with Kim and Brandi and Eileen is left in awe by Lisa Rinna after hearing her thoughts about some of the ladies.
125	16	"Hearing Is Believing"	March 15, 2016	1.70
The ladies attend Camille's cancer charity event where they shop for jewelry. Lisa Vanderpump and some of the ladies rally in a march. Lisa Vanderpump is confronted by Eileen on her possible manipulations whilst Lisa Rinna confesses her trust issues to Yolanda. Kathryn, Kyle and Yolanda head to New York in Erika's private jet.
126	17	"Lymes in the Sand"	March 22, 2016	1.83
In New York, the ladies attend a gala for Lyme disease where Yolanda receives an award and Kyle comes to a realization. Days later all the ladies but Yolanda travel to Dubai. Once in Dubai, after settling into their over-the-top hotel rooms, the ladies gather when doubts from Lisa Rinna provoke a discussion.
127	18	"Dubai Daze"	March 29, 2016	1.83
The ladies leave their hotels in Dubai to partake in driving through sand dunes, shopping at the local souk market and trying new cuisines. Despite Yolanda being back in Beverly Hills, the issues surrounding the Munchausen fallout leave some ladies feeling deserted.
128	19	"Goodbye, Dubai"	April 5, 2016	1.76
The women continue their vacation in Dubai and enjoy some retail therapy at an over-the-top mall. Lisa Vanderpump attempts a new apology to Eileen on top of the world’s tallest building, the Burj Khalifa. Erika gives Kathryn a birthday makeover compliments of her glam squad and all the ladies experience an extravagant yet tense dinner on a yacht in Dubai harbor. Back in Beverly Hills, Yolanda has a picnic with Kim and Brandi.
129	20	"Who Do You Believe?"	April 12, 2016	1.98
Kyle hosts a party at her desert home, however the drama from Dubai still lingers. Kyle's sister Kim and Lisa Rinna come face to face after almost a year of not seeing each other and old tensions are brought back up. News of Yolanda's divorce leaves many of the ladies shocked, and Yolanda reveals to Erika about the end of her marriage.
130	21	"Reunion Part One"	April 19, 2016	2.03
The reunion provides fun insights into Erika; Kyle defends her friend, Faye Resnick, in connection with the O.J. Simpson trial; Yolanda opens up about her pending divorce; a conversation about Yolanda's health leads to a surprising moment.
131	22	"Reunion Part Two"	April 26, 2016	1.88
Yolanda takes her friends to task for questioning her health issues; wounds are reopened when Kyle's sister, Kim Richards, returns to talk about her difficult year; Eileen confronts Lisa Vanderpump, causing her to break down in tears.
132	23	"Reunion Part Three"	May 3, 2016	1.67
The women relive the fun and drama from their trip to Dubai; while the others say nice things about each other, Lisa Rinna and Lisa Venderpump remain at an impasse; via video, Brandi Glanville voices her opinions about season six.
133	24	"Secrets Revealed"	May 10, 2016	1.01
Never-before-seen moments from season six; Erika Jayne's latest video is unveiled; Eileen's inner Erika comes out during a shopping trip; Lisa Rinna comes clean about using a strap-on; Kyle expression frustration over Portia's spending spree.
