= List of The Real Housewives of Beverly Hills episodes =

The Real Housewives of Beverly Hills is an American reality television series that premiered on Bravo on October 14, 2010. The series is the sixth installment in the network's The Real Housewives franchise.

The series' fifteenth season chronicles eight women in Beverly Hills: Kyle Richards, Erika Jayne, Dorit Kemsley, Sutton Stracke, Bozoma Saint John, Rachel Zoe, Tracy Tutor and Leah Remini they balance their personal and professional lives, along with their social circle.

Former cast members featured over the previous seasons are: Taylor Armstrong (1–3), Camille Grammer (1–2), Adrienne Maloof (1–3), Kim Richards (1–5), Lisa Vanderpump (1–9), Brandi Glanville (3–5), Yolanda Hadid (3–6), Carlton Gebbia (4), Joyce Giraud (4), Eileen Davidson (5–7), Lisa Rinna (5–12), Kathryn Edwards (6), Teddi Mellencamp Arroyave (8–10), Denise Richards (9–10), Garcelle Beauvais (10–14) Crystal Kung Minkoff (11–13), Diana Jenkins (12), Annemarie Wiley (13) and Amanda Frances (15).

As of May 7, 2026, a total of 329 original episodes of The Real Housewives of Beverly Hills have aired.

== Series overview ==
The Real Housewives of Beverly Hills episodes
Season	Episodes	Originally released		Average Viewers (millions)
Season	Episodes	First released	Last released	Average Viewers (millions)
1	17	October 14, 2010	February 15, 2011	1.92
2	24	September 5, 2011	February 16, 2012	2.17
3	22	November 5, 2012	April 8, 2013	1.99
4	23	November 4, 2013	April 7, 2014	1.81
5	23	November 18, 2014	April 21, 2015	1.81
6	24	December 1, 2015	May 10, 2016	1.75
7	21	December 6, 2016	April 25, 2017	1.73
8	22	December 19, 2017	May 15, 2018	1.63
9	24	February 12, 2019	July 30, 2019	1.66
10	20	April 15, 2020	September 23, 2020	1.46
11	24	May 19, 2021	November 3, 2021	1.19
12	24	May 11, 2022	October 26, 2022	1.16
13	20	October 25, 2023	March 13, 2024	1.03
14	20	November 19, 2024	April 15, 2025	0.82
15	21	December 4, 2025	May 7, 2026	0.72

== Episodes ==
=== Season 1 (2010–2011) ===
Taylor Armstrong, Camille Grammer, Adrienne Maloof, Kim Richards, Kyle Richards and Lisa Vanderpump are introduced as series regulars.

The Real Housewives of Beverly Hills season 1 episodes
No. overall	No. in season	Title	Original release date	U.S. viewers (millions)
1	1	"Life, Liberty and the Pursuit of Wealthiness"	October 14, 2010	1.53
2	2	"Chocolate Louboutins"	October 21, 2010	1.42
3	3	"Plenty of Baggage"	October 28, 2010	1.23
4	4	"It's My Party and I'll Spend If I Want To"	November 4, 2010	1.87
5	5	"I Would Never Say That"	November 11, 2010	1.75
6	6	"The Art of War"	November 18, 2010	1.82
7	7	"My Mansion Is Bigger Than Your Mansion"	December 2, 2010	2.02
8	8	"Charity Cases"	December 9, 2010	1.91
9	9	"The Dinner Party From Hell"	December 16, 2010	2.17
10	10	"Payback's a Bitch... Just Ask Your Husband"	December 23, 2010	1.81
11	11	"How to Behave"	January 6, 2011	2.16
12	12	"Turn, Turn, Turn"	January 13, 2011	2.31
13	13	"Unforgivable"	January 20, 2011	2.76
14	14	"Reunion: Part 1"	January 27, 2011	2.55
15	15	"Reunion: Part 2"	February 1, 2011	2.69
16	16	"The Lost Footage"	February 8, 2011	1.60
17	17	"Dinner Party From Hell: Producers Cut"	February 15, 2011	1.12

=== Season 2 (2011–2012) ===
Brandi Glanville and Dana Wilkey served in recurring capacities.

The Real Housewives of Beverly Hills season 2 episodes
No. overall	No. in season	Title	Original release date	U.S. viewers (millions)
18	1	"Back to Beverly Hills"	September 5, 2011	2.18
19	2	"Blame It on the Altitude"	September 12, 2011	1.56
20	3	"Rocky Mountain Highs and Lows"	September 19, 2011	1.71
21	4	"Gossip Girls"	September 26, 2011	1.88
22	5	"$25,000 Sunglasses?!"	October 3, 2011	1.97
23	6	"Let the Games Begin"	October 10, 2011	1.91
24	7	"Game Night Gone Wild!"	October 17, 2011	2.10
25	8	"The Opposite of Relaxation"	October 24, 2011	2.11
26	9	"Otherwise Engaged"	October 31, 2011	1.69
27	10	"Your Face or Mine?"	November 7, 2011	2.14
28	11	"Tempest in a Tea Party"	November 14, 2011	2.32
29	12	"The Great Divide"	November 21, 2011	2.06
30	13	"Adrienne's Fashion Show"	November 28, 2011	2.26
31	14	"Malibu Beach Party From Hell"	December 5, 2011	2.20
32	15	"A Book, a Bachelorette and a Breakdown"	December 12, 2011	2.35
33	16	"Uninvited"	December 19, 2011	2.44
34	17	"Leis and Lies in Lanai"	January 2, 2012	2.59
35	18	"A Day Late, An Apology Short"	January 9, 2012	2.50
36	19	"Night of a Thousand Surprises"	January 16, 2012	2.76
37	20	"The Real Wedding of Beverly Hills"	January 23, 2012	3.02
38	21	"Reunion: Part 1"	January 30, 2012	2.85
39	22	"Reunion: Part 2"	February 6, 2012	2.39
40	23	"Reunion: Part 3"	February 13, 2012	2.14
41	24	"The Lost Footage"	February 16, 2012	1.00

=== Season 3 (2012–2013) ===
Camille Grammer departed as a series regular; she continued to appear in a recurring capacity. Brandi Glanville and Yolanda Hadid joined the cast. Faye Resnick and Marisa Zanuck also served in recurring capacities.

The Real Housewives of Beverly Hills season 3 episodes
No. overall	No. in season	Title	Original release date	U.S. viewers (millions)
42	1	"Down and Left Out in Beverly Hills"	November 5, 2012	1.81
43	2	"The Higher the Heel, the Closer to God"	November 12, 2012	2.00
44	3	"Don't Sing for Your Supper"	November 19, 2012	1.87
45	4	"Uh Oh, Somebody's Crying!"	November 26, 2012	2.35
46	5	"Girls Gone Ojai'ld"	December 3, 2012	2.32
47	6	"She's Gone Too Far"	December 10, 2012	2.19
48	7	"Oy, Faye"	December 17, 2012	2.10
49	8	"Unsolved Mistresses"	January 7, 2013	1.95
50	9	"Moroccan Madness"	January 14, 2013	1.93
51	10	"Home Is Where the Art Is"	January 21, 2013	1.98
52	11	"Stars and Strips"	January 28, 2013	2.04
53	12	"Kim Nose Best"	February 4, 2013	2.08
54	13	"Game of Scones"	February 11, 2013	1.85
55	14	"White Party Pooper"	February 18, 2013	1.93
56	15	"The Real Housewives of Paris: Part Un"	February 25, 2013	1.89
57	16	"The Real Housewives of Paris: Part Deux"	March 4, 2013	1.80
58	17	"No Business Like Clothes Business"	March 11, 2013	1.56
59	18	"A Shot Through the Heart"	March 18, 2013	1.60
60	19	"Finale"	March 25, 2013	2.05
61	20	"Reunion: Part One"	March 25, 2013	2.29
62	21	"Reunion: Part Two"	April 1, 2013	2.12
63	22	"Secrets Revealed"	April 8, 2013	1.57

=== Season 4 (2013–2014) ===
Taylor Armstrong and Adrienne Maloof departed as series regulars. Carlton Gebbia and Joyce Giraud de Ohoven joined the cast.

The Real Housewives of Beverly Hills season 4 episodes
No. overall	No. in season	Title	Original release date	U.S. viewers (millions)
64	1	"A Catered Affair to Remember"	November 4, 2013	1.59
65	2	"Faint Chance"	November 11, 2013	1.72
66	3	"Life's a Witch"	November 18, 2013	1.78
67	4	"Irked at Cirque"	November 25, 2013	1.63
68	5	"Star of the Family"	December 2, 2013	1.90
69	6	"Palm Springs Breakers"	December 9, 2013	1.85
70	7	"Escape to Bitch Mountain"	December 16, 2013	2.01
71	8	"She Hears You, She Hears You Not"	December 23, 2013	1.73
72	9	"Guess Who's Coming to Dinner?"	December 30, 2013	2.01
73	10	"Catfight on the Catwalk"	January 6, 2014	1.83
74	11	"Luaus and Lies"	January 13, 2014	1.80
75	12	"Tough Break"	January 20, 2014	1.79
76	13	"The Curse of Carlton"	January 27, 2014	1.95
77	14	"The Birthday Witch"	February 3, 2014	1.91
78	15	"Trail of Doubts"	February 10, 2014	1.92
79	16	"Turning Down the Crown"	February 17, 2014	1.71
80	17	"Lines in the Sand"	February 24, 2014	1.80
81	18	"The Kids Are All Right"	March 3, 2014	1.83
82	19	"Are You My Friend?"	March 10, 2014	1.95
83	20	"Reunion Part 1"	March 17, 2014	1.72
84	21	"Reunion Part 2"	March 24, 2014	1.96
85	22	"Reunion Part 3"	March 31, 2014	1.82
86	23	"Secrets Revealed"	April 7, 2014	1.37

=== Season 5 (2014–2015) ===
Carlton Gebbia and Joyce Giraud de Ohoven departed as series regulars. Eileen Davidson and Lisa Rinna joined the cast.

The Real Housewives of Beverly Hills season 5 episodes
No. overall	No. in season	Title	Original release date	U.S. viewers (millions)
87	1	"Guess Who's Coming to the White Party?"	November 18, 2014	2.00
88	2	"Who Stalked J.R.?"	November 25, 2014	1.35
89	3	"Pay Attention to Me!"	December 2, 2014	1.99
90	4	"Livin' la Vida Housewife"	December 9, 2014	1.85
91	5	"Star Sighting"	December 16, 2014	1.71
92	6	"Medford, 90210"	December 23, 2014	1.38
93	7	"Breaking Branches"	December 30, 2014	1.64
94	8	"Wining and Dining"	January 6, 2015	1.84
95	9	"Live and Learn"	January 13, 2015	1.85
96	10	"House of Cards"	January 20, 2015	1.89
97	11	"It's Just a Scratch"	January 27, 2015	2.14
98	12	"Drama Queens"	February 3, 2015	1.73
99	13	"Sister Act"	February 10, 2015	1.86
100	14	"Surprise!"	February 17, 2015	1.78
101	15	"Welcome to Amsterdam?"	February 24, 2015	1.60
102	16	"Amster-damn!"	March 3, 2015	1.81
103	17	"Amster-damn Slap"	March 10, 2015	1.96
104	18	"Confessions Of A Housewife"	March 17, 2015	1.81
105	19	"The Party's Over"	March 24, 2015	1.88
106	20	"Reunion Part I"	March 31, 2015	2.27
107	21	"Reunion Part II"	April 7, 2015	2.13
108	22	"Reunion Part III"	April 14, 2015	1.97
109	23	"Secrets Revealed"	April 21, 2015	1.30

=== Season 6 (2015–2016) ===
Kim Richards and Brandi Glanville departed as series regulars. Kathryn Edwards and Erika Jayne joined the cast.

The Real Housewives of Beverly Hills season 6 episodes
No. overall	No. in season	Title	Original release date	U.S. viewers (millions)
110	1	"Life's a Pitch"	December 1, 2015	1.91
111	2	"Ciao, Tuscany!"	December 8, 2015	1.77
112	3	"Horsing Around"	December 15, 2015	1.53
113	4	"The M Word"	December 22, 2015	1.59
114	5	"Will Power"	December 29, 2015	1.78
115	6	"Hamptons, 90210"	January 5, 2016	1.78
116	7	"Pretty Mess"	January 12, 2016	1.81
117	8	"Going Deep"	January 19, 2016	1.85
118	9	"Busted BBQ"	January 26, 2016	1.82
119	10	"Backwards in Heels"	February 2, 2016	1.90
120	11	"Please Welcome Erika Jayne!"	February 9, 2016	1.81
121	12	"Hearing Problems"	February 16, 2016	1.90
122	13	"Spinning a Web"	February 23, 2016	1.79
123	14	"Not Easy to Love"	March 1, 2016	1.67
124	15	"Objection, Your Honor"	March 8, 2016	1.66
125	16	"Hearing Is Believing"	March 15, 2016	1.70
126	17	"Lymes in the Sand"	March 22, 2016	1.83
127	18	"Dubai Daze"	March 29, 2016	1.83
128	19	"Goodbye, Dubai"	April 5, 2016	1.76
129	20	"Who Do You Believe?"	April 12, 2016	1.98
130	21	"Reunion Part One"	April 19, 2016	2.03
131	22	"Reunion Part Two"	April 26, 2016	1.88
132	23	"Reunion Part Three"	May 3, 2016	1.67
133	24	"Secrets Revealed"	May 10, 2016	1.01

=== Season 7 (2016–2017) ===
Yolanda Hadid and Kathryn Edwards departed as series regulars. Dorit Kemsley joined the cast. Eden Sassoon served in a recurring capacity.

The Real Housewives of Beverly Hills season 7 episodes
No. overall	No. in season	Title	Original release date	U.S. viewers (millions)
134	1	"Stronger Than Ever"	December 6, 2016	1.63
135	2	"The Buddha Bentley Birthday"	December 13, 2016	1.60
136	3	"Going Commando"	December 20, 2016	1.84
137	4	"Pantygate"	December 27, 2016	2.01
138	5	"Amnesia Appetizers"	January 3, 2017	1.89
139	6	"Compromising Positions"	January 10, 2017	1.61
140	7	"It's Expensive to Be Me"	January 17, 2017	1.76
141	8	"Boys, Blades and Bag of Pills"	January 24, 2017	1.73
142	9	"Harry's Meat and Gatsby's Fete"	January 31, 2017	1.67
143	10	"Hostile Hacienda"	February 7, 2017	1.40
144	11	"Backed Into a Corner"	February 14, 2017	1.55
145	12	"Feeding a Need"	February 21, 2017	1.66
146	13	"Cake Therapy"	February 28, 2017	1.48
147	14	"Sweet Georgia Jayne"	March 7, 2017	1.63
148	15	"Hong Kong Fireworks"	March 14, 2017	1.65
149	16	"Big Buddha Brawl"	March 21, 2017	1.92
150	17	"From Dogs to Diamonds"	March 28, 2017	1.90
151	18	"Diamonds Under Pressure"	April 4, 2017	1.99
152	19	"Reunion, Part 1"	April 11, 2017	2.03
153	20	"Reunion, Part 2"	April 18, 2017	1.93
154	21	"Reunion, Part 3"	April 25, 2017	1.97

=== Season 8 (2017–2018) ===
Eileen Davidson departed as a series regular. Teddi Mellencamp Arroyave joined the cast. Camille Grammer served in a recurring capacity.

The Real Housewives of Beverly Hills season 8 episodes
No. overall	No. in season	Title	Original release date	U.S. viewers (millions)
155	1	"Don't Cry Over Spilled Wine"	December 19, 2017	1.65
156	2	"Diva Las Vegas"	December 26, 2017	1.64
157	3	"Bad Guys"	January 2, 2018	1.68
158	4	"Lights Out!"	January 9, 2018	1.62
159	5	"Unfashionably Late"	January 16, 2018	1.80
160	6	"Wham, Glam, Thank You Ma'am"	January 23, 2018	1.56
161	7	"Birthday Fever"	January 30, 2018	1.60
162	8	"Petty Mess"	February 6, 2018	1.58
163	9	"That Was Weird"	February 13, 2018	1.49
164	10	"The Big Apple Bites"	February 20, 2018	1.55
165	11	"Thank You, Thuck You"	February 27, 2018	1.74
166	12	"Gag Gift"	March 6, 2018	1.47
167	13	"Crying Shame"	March 13, 2018	1.61
168	14	"Heaven Knows"	March 20, 2018	1.78
169	15	"Dames, Dogs and Danke"	March 27, 2018	1.61
170	16	"Holy Schnitzel"	April 3, 2018	1.76
171	17	"Better Latex Than Never"	April 10, 2018	1.58
172	18	"The Runaway Runway"	April 17, 2018	1.80
173	19	"Reunion Part 1"	April 24, 2018	1.85
174	20	"Reunion Part 2"	May 1, 2018	1.61
175	21	"Reunion Part 3"	May 8, 2018	1.64
176	22	"Secrets Revealed"	May 15, 2018	1.16

=== Season 9 (2019) ===
Denise Richards joined the cast. Camille Grammer served in a recurring capacity.

The Real Housewives of Beverly Hills season 9 episodes
No. overall	No. in season	Title	Original release date	U.S. viewers (millions)
177	1	"Lucy Lucy Apple Juicy"	February 12, 2019	1.63
178	2	"Eat Your Heart Out"	February 19, 2019	1.57
179	3	"Sun and Shade in the Bahamas"	February 26, 2019	1.69
180	4	"Bahama Drama"	March 5, 2019	1.55
181	5	"The Proof Hurts"	March 12, 2019	1.55
182	6	"Fifty Shades of Shade"	March 19, 2019	1.61
183	7	"Eat Drink and Be Married"	March 26, 2019	1.65
184	8	"Showdown at Villa Rosa"	April 2, 2019	1.61
185	9	"A Wolf in Camille's Clothing"	April 9, 2019	1.81
186	10	"A Supreme Snub"	April 16, 2019	1.72
187	11	"Do You Really Want to Hurt Me?"	April 23, 2019	1.69
188	12	"The Ultimate Ultimatum"	April 30, 2019	1.70
189	13	"Grilling Me Softly"	May 7, 2019	1.73
190	14	"The Show Must Go On"	May 14, 2019	1.76
191	15	"One Wedding and a Polygraph"	May 21, 2019	1.66
192	16	"Meet Rinna Jayne"	May 28, 2019	1.71
193	17	"A Double Shot of Brandi"	June 4, 2019	1.60
194	18	"Pardon Our French"	June 11, 2019	1.54
195	19	"Thirst Impressions"	June 18, 2019	1.67
196	20	"Un Petit Hangover"	June 25, 2019	1.63
197	21	"Hurricane Camille"	July 9, 2019	1.82
198	22	"Reunion Part 1"	July 16, 2019	1.75
199	23	"Reunion Part 2"	July 23, 2019	1.81
200	24	"Reunion Part 3"	July 30, 2019	1.45

=== Season 10 (2020) ===
Lisa Vanderpump departed as a series regular. Garcelle Beauvais joined the cast. Sutton Stracke served in a recurring capacity.

The Real Housewives of Beverly Hills season 10 episodes
No. overall	No. in season	Title	Original release date	U.S. viewers (millions)
201	1	"The Crown Isn't So Heavy"	April 15, 2020	1.35
202	2	"To Live and Text in Beverly Hills"	April 22, 2020	1.35
203	3	"First Impressions, True Confessions"	April 29, 2020	1.52
204	4	"All's Fair in Glam and War"	May 6, 2020	1.64
205	5	"Let the Mouse Go!"	May 13, 2020	1.45
206	6	"Read Between the Signs"	May 20, 2020	1.59
207	7	"Santa Denise"	May 27, 2020	1.52
208	8	"Mind Your P's and BBQ's"	June 3, 2020	1.63
209	9	"Until We Leave Again"	July 8, 2020	1.38
210	10	"Black Ties and White Lies"	July 15, 2020	1.41
211	11	"Kiss and Tell All"	July 22, 2020	1.41
212	12	"Roman Rumors"	July 29, 2020	1.56
213	13	"There's No Place Like Rome"	August 5, 2020	1.30
214	14	"That's Not Amore"	August 12, 2020	1.58
215	15	"Sex, Lies and Text Messages"	August 19, 2020	1.40
216	16	"Denise and Desist"	August 26, 2020	1.61
217	17	"Reunion Part 1"	September 2, 2020	1.70
218	18	"Reunion Part 2"	September 9, 2020	1.47
219	19	"Reunion Part 3"	September 16, 2020	1.50
220	20	"Secrets Revealed"	September 23, 2020	0.78

=== Season 11 (2021) ===
Teddi Mellencamp Arroyave and Denise Richards departed as series regulars. Crystal Kung Minkoff and Sutton Stracke joined the cast. Kathy Hilton served in a recurring capacity.

The Real Housewives of Beverly Hills season 11 episodes
No. overall	No. in season	Title	Original release date	U.S. viewers (millions)
221	1	"Dressed to the 90210s"	May 19, 2021	0.95
222	2	"Two Truths and a Lie"	May 26, 2021	0.90
223	3	"Sutton's Gotta Give"	June 2, 2021	1.07
224	4	"Overexposed"	June 9, 2021	1.09
225	5	"The Divided States Of Erika"	June 16, 2021	1.08
226	6	"The Liberation Of Erika Jayne"	June 23, 2021	1.18
227	7	"Defining Women"	June 30, 2021	1.10
228	8	"The Good, The Bad and The Ugly Leather Pants"	July 7, 2021	1.17
229	9	"A Pretty Meltdown"	July 14, 2021	1.07
230	10	"Affairs and Accidents"	July 21, 2021	1.17
231	11	"Ice Queen of the Desert"	August 4, 2021	1.12
232	12	"Circle of Distrust"	August 11, 2021	1.13
233	13	"Season's Grillings"	August 18, 2021	1.18
234	14	"Lips Unsealed"	August 25, 2021	1.28
235	15	"The Dinner Party From Hell: Part Two"	September 1, 2021	1.22
236	16	"Threats and Promises"	September 8, 2021	1.29
237	17	"A Tale of Two Accidents"	September 15, 2021	1.25
238	18	"Del Mar by the Shade"	September 22, 2021	1.18
239	19	"Over-Poured and Over-Board"	September 29, 2021	1.16
240	20	"New Year, Old Grudges"	October 6, 2021	1.26
241	21	"Reunion Part 1"	October 13, 2021	1.52
242	22	"Reunion Part 2"	October 20, 2021	1.47
243	23	"Reunion Part 3"	October 27, 2021	1.39
244	24	"Reunion Part 4"	November 3, 2021	1.32

=== Season 12 (2022) ===
Diana Jenkins joined the cast. Kathy Hilton and Sheree Zampino served in recurring capacities.

The Real Housewives of Beverly Hills season 12 episodes
No. overall	No. in season	Title	Original release date	U.S. viewers (millions)
245	1	"The Break-In"	May 11, 2022	1.15
246	2	"Receipt Offender"	May 18, 2022	0.94
247	3	"There's Sutton About Crystal"	May 25, 2022	0.99
248	4	"The Crystal Conundrum"	June 1, 2022	1.18
249	5	"In Hot Water"	June 8, 2022	1.15
250	6	"High Cries and Misty Demeanors"	June 15, 2022	1.16
251	7	"Ship-Faced"	June 22, 2022	1.18
252	8	"It Takes a Villain"	June 29, 2022	1.04
253	9	"Calamity Jayne"	July 6, 2022	1.14
254	10	"So You Say"	July 13, 2022	1.21
255	11	"The Weight of Words"	July 20, 2022	1.05
256	12	"Beverly Hills Blackout"	July 27, 2022	1.14
257	13	"Rosé Colored Glasses"	August 3, 2022	1.18
258	14	"Shameless Not Ruthless"	August 10, 2022	1.16
259	15	"Disco Inferno"	August 17, 2022	1.05
260	16	"Altitude Adjustment"	August 31, 2022	1.08
261	17	"The Girl with the Diamond Earrings"	September 7, 2022	1.22
262	18	"Rocky Mountain Bye"	September 14, 2022	1.17
263	19	"We Need to Talk About Kathy"	September 21, 2022	1.12
264	20	"Silence Is Golden"	September 28, 2022	1.12
265	21	"Not My Sister's Keeper"	October 5, 2022	1.20
266	22	"Reunion Part 1"	October 12, 2022	1.43
267	23	"Reunion Part 2"	October 19, 2022	1.40
268	24	"Reunion Part 3"	October 26, 2022	1.45

=== Season 13 (2023–2024) ===
Lisa Rinna and Diana Jenkins departed as series regulars. Annemarie Wiley joined the cast.

The Real Housewives of Beverly Hills season 13 episodes
No. overall	No. in season	Title	Original release date	US viewers (millions)
269	1	"The Eaglewoman Has Landed"	October 25, 2023	1.02
270	2	"An Unwise Surprise"	November 1, 2023	0.88
271	3	"It's Not About the Pants"	November 8, 2023	0.96
272	4	"Hellevator"	November 15, 2023	1.02
273	5	"Sutton-ly Suspicious"	November 22, 2023	0.81
274	6	"Ring Around the Rumor"	November 29, 2023	1.01
275	7	"Dazed and Accused"	December 6, 2023	1.01
276	8	"Esopha-Gate"	December 13, 2023	1.01
277	9	"A Feisty Fiesta"	December 20, 2023	0.96
278	10	"Re-Lentless Erika"	January 3, 2024	1.11
279	11	"A Celebration of Life"	January 10, 2024	1.10
280	12	"Bitter Pill to Swallow"	January 17, 2024	1.09
281	13	"Tapas and Tattletales"	January 24, 2024	1.17
282	14	"Aches and Spains"	January 31, 2024	1.11
283	15	"Ashing It Out"	February 7, 2024	1.04
284	16	"Diamonds in the Rough"	February 14, 2024	0.94
285	17	"Soirees and Separations"	February 21, 2024	1.08
286	18	"Reunion Part 1"	February 28, 2024	1.14
287	19	"Reunion Part 2"	March 6, 2024	1.13
288	20	"Reunion Part 3"	March 13, 2024	1.06

=== Season 14 (2024–2025) ===
Crystal Kung Minkoff and Annemarie Wiley departed as series regulars. Bozoma Saint John joined the cast. Kathy Hilton and Jennifer Tilly served in recurring capacities.

The Real Housewives of Beverly Hills season 14 episodes
No. overall	No. in season	Title	Original release date	US viewers (millions)
289	1	"Grace Time Is Over"	November 19, 2024	0.80
290	2	"A Sobering Separation"	November 26, 2024	0.71
291	3	"Life's a Beach"	December 3, 2024	0.71
292	4	"Twisted Sisterhood"	December 10, 2024	0.78
293	5	"High Horses and Low Blows"	December 17, 2024	0.81
294	6	"Venom in the Viper Room"	January 7, 2025	0.91
295	7	"What the Chuck?"	January 14, 2025	0.83
296	8	"A Perfect Storm Out"	January 21, 2025	0.84
297	9	"Beachy Keen"	January 28, 2025	0.87
298	10	"Sweet Home Augusta"	February 4, 2025	0.77
299	11	"Mind Your Business"	February 11, 2025	0.74
300	12	"Land of the Free, Home of the Shade"	February 18, 2025	0.78
301	13	"Caviar Catastrophe"	February 25, 2025	0.85
302	14	"Hemlines and Headlines"	March 4, 2025	0.80
303	15	"Trouble in Paradise"	March 11, 2025	0.83
304	16	"Sutton on Trial at Sea"	March 18, 2025	0.80
305	17	"A Caribbean Send Off"	March 25, 2025	0.90
306	18	"Reunion Part 1"	April 1, 2025	0.97
307	19	"Reunion Part 2"	April 8, 2025	0.82
308	20	"Reunion Part 3"	April 15, 2025	0.91

=== Season 15 (2025–2026) ===
Garcelle Beauvais departed as a series regular. Amanda Frances and Rachel Zoe joined the cast. Kathy Hilton, Jennifer Tilly and Natalie Swanston Fuller served in recurring capacities.

The Real Housewives of Beverly Hills season 15 episodes
No. overall	No. in season	Title	Original release date	US viewers (millions)
309	1	"Hot Girl Summer"	December 4, 2025	0.62
310	2	"Bearing It All"	December 11, 2025	0.64
311	3	"A Match Made in Beverly Hills"	December 18, 2025	0.60
312	4	"A Housewives Heatwave"	January 8, 2026	0.58
313	5	"Not Feeling the Healing"	January 15, 2026	0.58
314	6	"Star Signs and Bad Times"	January 22, 2026	0.65
315	7	"Headlines and Heartbreak"	January 29, 2026	0.73
316	8	"Do You Remember?!?"	February 5, 2026	0.81
317	9	"Vacation and Manifestation"	February 12, 2026	0.78
318	10	"The Cult's Out of the Bag"	February 19, 2026	0.82
319	11	"The Price of Divorce"	February 26, 2026	0.67
320	12	"Arrivederci Beverly Hills"	March 5, 2026	0.68
321	13	"Read the Room"	March 12, 2026	0.74
322	14	"Unmasking the Truth"	March 19, 2026	0.79
323	15	"Stranded Under the Tuscan Sun"	March 26, 2026	0.78
324	16	"The Last Supper"	April 2, 2026	0.77
325	17	"Drama on the Dance Floor"	April 9, 2026	0.77
326	18	"Closing Chapters"	April 16, 2026	0.75
327	19	"Reunion Part 1"	April 23, 2026	0.82
328	20	"Reunion Part 2"	April 30, 2026	0.81
329	21	"Reunion Part 3"	May 7, 2026	0.78
