= The Real Housewives of Beverly Hills season 5 =

The Real Housewives of Beverly Hills
- Season 5
- Cover used by iTunes (Left to right) Hadid, Kim Richards, Vanderpump, Glanville, Kyle, Davidson and Rinna
- Starring: Kim Richards; Kyle Richards; Lisa Vanderpump; Brandi Glanville; Yolanda Hadid; Eileen Davidson; Lisa Rinna
- No. of episodes: 23

Release
- Original network: Bravo
- Original release: November 18, 2014 – April 21, 2015

Season chronology
- ← Previous; Season 4 Next → Season 6

The fifth season of The Real Housewives of Beverly Hills, an American reality television series, aired on Bravo from November 18, 2014 to April 21, 2015, and is primarily filmed in Beverly Hills, California.

The season focuses on the personal and professional lives of Kyle Richards, Lisa Vanderpump, Brandi Glanville, Yolanda Foster, Eileen Davidson, Lisa Rinna, and Kim Richards. The season consisted of 23 episodes.

This season marked the final regular appearances for both Kim Richards and Brandi Glanville.

The season's executive producers are Andrew Hoegl, Barrie Bernstein, Lisa Shannon, Pam Healy and Andy Cohen.

== Production and crew ==
The Real Housewives of Beverly Hills was officially renewed for a fifth season in April 2014 The renewal was later confirmed by both Vanderpump and Kyle Richards confirming their return to the series, as well as filming to commence in June 2014. Early in the month of November 2014, the full cast, premiere date and trailer were officially announced.

The season premiere "Guess Who's Coming to the White Party?" was aired on November 18, 2014, while the nineteenth episode "The Party's Over" served as the season finale, and was aired on March 24, 2015. It was followed by a three-part reunion that aired on March 31, April 7 and April 14, 2015 and a "Secrets Revealed" episode on April 21, 2015, which marked the conclusion of the season. Alex Baskin, Chris Cullen, Douglas Ross, Greg Stewart, Toni Gallagher, Dave Rupel and Andy Cohen are recognized as the series' executive producers; it is produced and distributed by Evolution Media.

== Cast and synopsis ==
=== Cast ===
Five of the seven wives from season four returned for the fifth installment. Shortly after season four concluded, Carlton Gebbia and Joyce Giraud de Ohoven were fired from the series. Andy Cohen, the executive producer and host, chronicled in his tell-all book on their departure, stating that prior to filming the reunion of season four, he knew it would be their first and last. Cohen went on to describe his displeasure with Giraud de Ohoven at the reunion and his fantasy of firing her saying, "my mind turned the corner into morphing this into some kind of alternate universe version of the Housewives: “Joyce, you are no longer a Housewife. Please leave the reunion." Despite her departure from the series, Giraud de Ohoven has remained friends with former cast member Vanderpump and guest starred on Vanderpump Rules. Shortly after Gebbia's departure, she spoke to Giuliana Rancic on a red carpet saying that it was a "blessing in disguise." On January 21, 2015, on an episode of Watch What Happens Live!, Andy Cohen admitted to Vanderpump that Gebbia got a "bad edit" saying, "you know she's a PTA mom, we portrayed her with all the sex stuff, and the Wiccan stuff, and that was it. I know there was more to her, and I feel like she got an unfair shake," which Vanderpump agreed. With Cohen's revelation it later prompted Gebbia to admitting that she would be open to returning, during Brandi Glanville's podcast. Gebbia also went on to say that she felt validated and appreciated his honesty.

With the departure of the two housewives, Gebbia and Giraud de Ohoven, season five saw the introduction of two new housewives, Eileen Davidson and Lisa Rinna. Rinna initially auditioned for season one, revealed Cohen who then went on to describe that he didn't see her fitting with the show saying, "you know Lisa Rinna was on the first casting tape for Beverly Hills. In the first season of Beverly Hills, I thought "I don't see it. It's weird. It's not what this show is." Despite not being cast in the first season, much speculation occurred in the fourth that Rinna would be joining as well, but only ended up guest starring at Kyle Richard's boutique opening.

In addition to Davidson and Rinna, season five also saw the guest appearances of former cast members, Taylor Armstrong, Camille Grammer and Adrienne Maloof.

Davidson was born and raised in Artesia, and grew up in a Catholic house hold. Davidson went on to pursue acting at the age of twenty-one and built notoriety in, the now cult-classic, The House on Sorority Row . For Davidson, this was just the beginning of a successful career with roles in Eternity and Broken Badges. Davidson's most famous roles, however, are playing Ashley Abbott on the daytime soap The Young and the Restless, and also as Kristen DiMera on Days of Our Lives. She later went to win an Emmy for Outstanding Lead Actress, after three nominations, for her portrayal of Kristen DiMera. Davidson has also had success with writing; she has written four novels with prolific mystery writer Robert Randisi, three of which were published by Penguin Paperback. When Davidson isn't writing or acting, she lives in her Malibu home raising her 12-year-old son Jesse, and bonding with her two step sons: 22-year-old Duke and 20-year-old Vinny. Davidson is happily married to Vincent Van Patten, a former starchily and professional tennis player who is the son of Hollywood legend, Dick Van Patten.

Rinna was born in Newport Beach, but at the age of seven her and her family moved to the small city of Medford and from there she was raised. Rinna always was dreamed of something grander, which lead her to moving back to California to San Francisco where she pursued modelling. Several years after modelling, Rinna switch career paths and decided to move to Los Angeles to pursue acting in which she landed her first television role in The Hogan Family and later went to appear in Baywatch. From that point, nothing held Rinna back as she went on to have a successful career with an extensive list of appearances from television to film. Rinna, who is also a daytime actress like Davidson, is widely known for her roles as Billie Reed on Days of Our Lives, as well as Taylor McBride on Melrose Place. Rinna serves a motto of never turning down a job, which leads to her being featured in work such as; Veronica Mars, Entourage, Sex, Lies and Obsession and Another Woman's Husband. Rinna joins The Real Housewives of Beverly Hills as no stranger to reality television with appearances including; The Celebrity Apprentice, All-Star Celebrity Apprentice, Sing Your Face Off, Dancing with the Stars, and her very own show Harry Loves Lisa. Rinna has also hosted her own talk show Soap Talk, which she earned four Emmy nominations in the Outstanding Talk Show Host category. Rinna later revisited her modeling days and posed for Playboy. Not only is Rinna a successful model and established actress, but she is also a New York Times best-selling author with her three books, The Big, Fun, Sexy Sex Book, Starlit, and Rinnavation. Rinna also takes pride in her Lisa Rinna Collection for QVC. When Rinna isn't focusing on her work, she is dedicated to being a loving wife to Harry Hamlin and raising her two teenage daughters, Delilah Belle and Amelia Gray.

=== Synopsis ===
The Real Housewives of Beverly Hills season five begins with Kyle Richards planning her annual white party, which has become an event-of-the-year in Beverly Hills. Kyle feels the pressure as it has continued to grow, so she plans it with the help of her event-planner, Glenn Schneider. Kyle reveals that her and Lisa Vanderpump haven't spoken since last years reunion. Brandi Glanville and Yolanda Foster continue to grow closer, and have since the reunion. Foster continues to fight her battle with Lyme disease as well as celebrates her daughter, Gigi's success. Glanville celebrates her own success with her podcast and receiving a third book deal. Vanderpump has separated herself from the group, since last years Puerto Rico trip and still feels hurt and betrayed. Despite the tension, Vanderpump meets Kyle for lunch where the two catch-up, reconcile and make a pact to not talk about one another behind each other's back. Lisa Rinna is introduced when she receives a call from Kyle to be invited to her white party. Prior to the night of the white party, Vanderpump has also met with Foster to reconcile and move forward in their friendship. Kim Richards, Vanderpump, Glanville and Foster attend, as well as former cast members; Camille Grammer, Adrienne Maloof and Taylor Armstrong, all attend the white party. Kyle and Grammer move forward from their past differences as do Vanderpump and Grammer. Kyle is elated with Armstrong's new happiness with her marriage and her husband adopting her daughter. At the party, Glanville feels anxiety from being in the same place with people she has differences with, such as Maloof and Vanderpump. When all the original cast bond together, Glanville is left feeling left out and excommunicated which brings back memories of when she first entered the scene. Maloof and Vanderpump move forward from their animosity, Vanderpump is happy for Maloof as she has new boyfriend since getting divorced from Paul Nassif. Rinna arrives at the party with her husband, Harry Hamlin, and displays that she has history with a lot of the women. Glanville pulls Maloof aside to talk out their differences and the two agree to meet at a later date in a more appropriate place to discuss it further.

Eileen Davidson who is officially introduced in episode three, catches up with her old friend Rinna. Davidson returns to work after a hiatus to reprise her infamous role on Days of Our Lives. Davidson and Foster meet as they both reside in Malibu and later meets the others at Kyle's barbecue. At dinner with Foster, Glanville and Rinna, Davidson opens up about how her marriage started which offends Glanville. Glanville begins to drink too much and encourages Davidson to play her role, after Davidson insist on not doing it Glanville throws wine in face. At Foster's dinner party, Glanville apologizes to Davidson, but later in the evening tension begin to arise when Davidson and Rinna discuss Glanville's actions. Eileen hosts a poker night at her home, but it soon goes awry with Glanville's rude comments on the decor and Kim's erratic behavior. Davidson attends her movie premiere at a local shopping center and invites several of the ladies along. Davidson later hosts a mediation between the two Richards sisters. During a dinner in Amsterdam, Davidson finds herself in an argument with Kim and is accused of being a beast. The argument escalates when Rinna gets involved.

Rinna meets her new agent who she describes a hustler, and the pairs discuss recent possibilities of work. Rinna attends a birthday dinner, hosted by Vanderpump at her restaurant PUMP. Rinna takes a trip to her hometown of Medford with her daughters to visit her parents as well as seeing her childhood home for the last time. Rinna who returns to Beverly Hills, guest co-hosts Access Hollywood Live. Rinna films a new movie alongside her husband and renown magician, Penn Jillette. On the way to Davidson's poker night, Rinna rides with Kim but is deeply concerned and scared by her erratic behavior. After the drama of poker night, Rinna hosts a jewelry party and her and some of the other ladies call Glanville out on her recent actions. Rinna engages in a conversation with Glanville at Kyle's mixer and insist that Kim's behavior was due to substance abuse. Rinna attends a lunch with Glanville and tells her that she has so much influence over Kim that she should be influencing her in a positive way and not encouraging her to behave poorly. En route to Amsterdam, while stopping in Canada for a gala, Rinna is confronted by Richards on her talking to Glanville about her sobriety. During a dinner in Amsterdam, Kim argues with Davidson which provoke Rinna to get involved. Rinna and Kim get into an explosive argument full of accusation, with one triggering Rinna to smash a glass on the table and reaching to choke Kim.

Vanderpump relishes in her new restaurant, PUMP and throws a birthday dinner for Rinna. Vanderpump is receiving a plaque on the Palm Springs Walk of Stars, and invites Rinna along. Vanderpump returns home to Beverly Hills and deals with her pet swans. Later at Kyle's barbecue, Vanderpump declines Glanville's invitation to a housewarming as they have a long way to go. Despite saying she wouldn't attend, Vanderpump takes a step in the direction of moving forward and surprised Glanville by attending her housewarming. Later at a charity event at her restaurant PUMP, Vanderpump is offended by Glanville literally extends the olive branch after ripping a branch off her very old olive trees. Glanville then proceeds to make a very unusual and sexual offer to Vanderpump. Vanderpump meets with Glanville to discuss the hurt and the breakdown of their friendship, claiming that it will never be the same again. After hearing about the drama at poker night, Vanderpump bonds with Kyle over their betrayal from Glanville. Vanderpump feels conflicting emotions when she learns that her son Max, who's adopted, want to take a DNA test to learn about his ancestry. Vanderpump receives a surprise birthday party, but the real surprise is that her husband invited Glanville. Whilst on a boat in Amsterdam, Vanderpump engages in playful conversation with Glanville, who then slaps Vanderpump on the face, wanting Vanderpump to slap her back but Vanderpump is no longer playing when she is left shocked by the slap. Vanderpump attempts to confront Glanville on the slap that occurred in Amsterdam, but Glanville doesn't want to hear about it.

Foster who has been unwell, surprises her husband David Foster by dressing up in some sexy lingerie. Later, Foster meets with Kim to ride horses. After heading to Spain to meet with Kyle, Foster receives a call with horrible news about her daughter Bella involving drink driving. Foster heads back to Beverly Hills to handle the situation. Foster meets with Davidson because they both reside in Malibu and invites Davidson to Kyle's barbecue. Foster struggles with trusting her daughter after the DUI. Foster worries for Glanville and offers her help in regards to her drinking but is hurt when Glanville responds by making a comment about her daughter. In Amsterdam, Foster shows the ladies where she grew up and runs into an ex who lives in a windmill. During part one of the reunion, Foster reveals she is relapsing with her illness and leaves the couch early.

Kyle and her family take a trip to Lake Tahoe, by a jet. Kyle heads to Spain for a trip and enjoys her 100-foot-long private yacht in Mallorca. Foster later joins Kyle on her trip but things soon take a turn for the worse when Foster receives a call. Kyle leaves her trip in Spain early to attend her niece's wedding. At Davidson's poker night, Kyle worries for her sister after she displays erratic behavior reminiscent of the days she was drinking. Kyle attempts to communicate with her sister but feels Glanville is coming between the two. Glanville take Kim outside and refuses Kyle to see her, which results in a physical altercation between Kyle and Glanville as well as an explosive argument between the two sisters. Kyle seeks support in Vanderpump after the poker night, and the two bond over their betrayal and broken friendship with Glanville. Kyle visits Kim shortly after her release from hospital and is hurt after Kim condones Glanville's behavior. Later, Kyle hosts a gay mixer and Glanville arrives uninvited with Kim. Kyle begins to reflect on Glanville's action and realizes Glanville has been planning to turn her and her sister against each other. Kyle apologize for laying hand on Glanville and the two soon get into an argument on Glanville over-stepping her boundaries by coming between two sisters. The argument escalates and Glanville threatens to knock Kyle's teeth out and claims Kyle's husband doesn't want her. Kyle attends a lunch with Kim that is mediated by Davidson in attempts to move forward, but Kyle insists that Glanville is influencing Kim. After the explosive dinner between Kim and Rinna, Kyle flees the table in tears. She is later yelled at by Glanville and accused of being fake. Kyle receives information from Rinna of some of the things Glanville has said, such as Kim needing an intervention. Kyle meets with Kim in Palm Springs and tell her what is and isn't good for her as well as bringing up the thing Glanville has said, but Kim insists she is lying.

Kim, who has bonded even more with Glanville, heads to Glanville's house to help pack. Later the pair dress up to spy of Glanville's ex. Kim and Foster, who have also become closer, meet to ride horses. Kim opens up about her ex-husband, who is still her best friend, revealing he isn't well. Kim then takes her daughter, Brooke, wedding dress shopping and later celebrates her wedding day. Kim heads up the coast to Santa Barbara for a relaxing spa day they may end up comprising her sobriety. During a Poker night at Davidson's home, Kim displays some erratic behavior that has everyone worried, especially her sister Kyle. After Kyle's questioning, it leads to an explosive argument with Glanville escorting Kim away from the house. Kim is admitted to hospital after not feeling well and having a cough. It turns out she has a broken rib, and the night of the poker party she took something for the pain. She is released from hospital and is visited by Kyle and Glanville at separate times and finds herself in a game of she-said-she-said. At Kyle's gay mixer, Kim is put in the middle of Kyle and Glanville's argument and her struggle with her sobriety is revealed and she is left taking Glanville's side and claims she is defending herself. Kim attends a lunch with Kyle that is mediated by Davidson in attempts to move forward, but Kim insists that Kyle doesn't care enough to keep things private. On the way to Amsterdam, Kim confronts Rinna on her recent conversation with Glanville insinuating that Kim has relapsed. While in Amsterdam, Kim feels attacked by both Davidson and Rinna. She calls them out on their judgment which results in to an explosive argument. Kim insinuates Rinna has an eating disorder and brings up Rinna's husband which provokes Rinna into smashing a wine glass. Kim meets with Kyle in Palm Springs where Kyle addressing the issue of Glanville. Kyle claims Glanville is speaking about Kim's sobriety negatively but Kim believes Kyle is lying. Kim later requests answers from Glanville and ends up believing her over her sister. During the reunion part three, Kim admitted to taking one of her ex-husband's pills. She claims she hasn't slipped or relapsed. After the reunion, Kim appeared on a Dr. Phil special discussing her relapse and recent drunken arrest admitting that she drank while the series was airing and prior to the reunion. Her son revealed that she also takes pills and smokes pot.

Glanville prepares moving into a new house by hiring some hunky movers. Glanville invites Kim over to help pack but is more distracted by their abs. Later, Glanville and Kim disguise themselves to spy in Glanville's ex-boyfriend. Glanville later meets Maloof to discuss their history, Glanville apologizes and owns her wrongdoings and the two agree to move forward. Glanville rejoices in moving into her new home, but then has to deal with drama involving her ex-husband, Eddie Cibrian. Glanville attempts to invite Vanderpump to her housewarming, but Vanderpump makes it clear they have a long way to go. Glanville is surprised when Vanderpump does in fact show up. Glanville attend Vanderpump's charity event and extends the olive branch and makes a usual offer in the efforts to move forward. Glanville meets with Vanderpump in hopes to move forward with the friendship. Vanderpump reveals to Glanville, after all the hurt, that their friendship will never be the same. Later at a dinner with Davidson, Rinna and Foster, Glanville and Davidson begin to have tension after Glanville hears about how Davidson's marriage began. Later in the dinner, Glanville insists on Davidson playing her infamous character and the insisting is taken too far when Glanville throws wine at Davidson. Later at a dinner party at Foster's home, Glanville apologizes to Davidson. Tensions between to two arise when Rinna and Davidson begin to question Glanville's behavior. A curious Glanville tunes in to her ex-husband's new reality show to check it out. During a poke night at Davidson's home, Glanville feels the need to protect he close friend Kim from her sister Kyle after they accuse her of displaying erratic behavior. In the attempts to remove Kim from the property, Glanville gets into a physical altercation with Kyle. Following the aftermath of the poke night at Rinna's jewelry party Glanville is called out by the other ladies on her recent behavior. Glanville visits Kim after her release from hospital, and is affirmed that her actions at poker night were okay and that her and Kim are still friends. Glanville arrives at Kyle's gay mixer and engages in a conversation with Rinna about Kim's possible substance abuse. Later, Glanville gets into an argument with Kyle after Kyle accuses her of coming in between family members. Glanville insists she is there for Kim more than Kyle, as well as revealing Kim struggles with her sobriety. Glanville meets Rinna for lunch where she is advised to address Kim's drinking issues as she has influence over her. Glanville agrees to do a 21-day cleanse with no alcohol, but after attending Vanderpump's surprise birthday, she is left reconsidering her 21-day sobriety. After visiting a hash shop in Amsterdam, Brandi calls Kyle out on being fake as they have gotten high together previously. Glanville plays along with Vanderpump, on a riverboat in Amsterdam, about ways of seeking retribution from Vanderpump, wanting Vanderpump to slap her back, Glanville slaps Vanderpump playfully across the face, but Vanderpump is left shock and no longer playing. Glanville later apologizes for the slap but Vanderpump declines to accept. Glanville skips the final dinner in Amsterdam to go on a date with a young man she met, who also happens to be friends with Vanderpump's son.

== Reception ==
=== U.S. television ratings ===
The Real Housewives of Beverly Hills season five premiere was the highest-rated season premiere in over three years 2 million total viewers and 1.1 rating for viewers aged 18–49, this marked a 25 percent and 36 percent increase compared to the prior season's premiere. The Real Housewives of Beverly Hills continued with a ratings success with its second part reunion. The second part of the three-part reunion attracted 2.9 million total viewers; 1.8 million for viewers aged 25–54, and 1.7 million for viewers aged 18–49.This was a three percent and six percent increase the season four's second part reunion.

== Episodes ==
The Real Housewives of Beverly Hills season 5 episodes
No. overall	No. in season	Title	Original release date	U.S. viewers (millions)
87	1	"Guess Who's Coming to the White Party?"	November 18, 2014	2.00
The fifth season commences with Kyle's annual White Party, which is more extravagant than ever and former housewives make an appearance. Lisa begins to reconnect with Yolanda and Kyle.
88	2	"Who Stalked J.R.?"	November 25, 2014	1.35
Brandi moves into her new house with help from Kim. Kyle and her family take a trip to Lake Tahoe. Meanwhile, Yolanda serves up a unusually special dinner. Later, Kim and Brandi don disguises to spy on Brandi's ex-boyfriend, J.R.
89	3	"Pay Attention to Me!"	December 2, 2014	1.99
Lisa Vanderpump throws Lisa Rinna a private birthday dinner at PUMP. Brandi settles into her new home while dealing with her ex-husband drama. Elsewhere, Kim goes dress shopping with her daughter. Afterwards, Lisa Rinna decides to visit an old friend and fellow actress Eileen Davidson.
90	4	"Livin' la Vida Housewife"	December 9, 2014	1.85
Lisa Vanderpump receives a plaque on the Palm Springs Walk of Stars, and only Lisa Rinna is invited to attend which brings them closer. Kyle and her family travel to Barcelona, Spain and basks on a private yacht. Yolanda joins in on the fun that is until she receives a phone call relating to terrible news.
91	5	"Star Sighting"	December 16, 2014	1.71
Kyle returns early from Spain to attend Kim's daughter's wedding. Eileen reprises her soap opera role on The Young and The Restless.
92	6	"Medford, 90210"	December 23, 2014	1.38
Yolanda and Eileen begin to bond over family and an unexpected connection involving their children. Lisa Vanderpump returns home from Palm Springs. Meanwhile, Lisa Rinna decides to go to her Oregon hometown to visit her ailing parents. Afterwards, Eileen meets all of the ladies at Kyle's barbecue.
93	7	"Breaking Branches"	December 30, 2014	1.64
Brandi hosts a party where an unexpected guest shows up. Elsewhere, Lisa Rinna hosts Access Hollywood Live.
94	8	"Wining and Dining"	January 6, 2015	1.84
Brandi and Lisa Vanderpump finally meet one on one to address their rather shaky relationship over lunch. Yolanda is plagued by trust issues. Eileen and Brandi trade marriage stories, but their get-together soon takes a turn for the ugly. Afterwards, Yolanda decides to host a dinner party.
95	9	"Live and Learn"	January 13, 2015	1.85
Kyle and Yolanda both have common concerns about their daughters attending college. In other developments, Lisa Vanderpump discovers her son's aspirations. Lisa Rinna shoots a film with husband Harry Hamlin and magic man Penn Jillette. Brandi sizes up her former husband's new reality show.
96	10	"House of Cards"	January 20, 2015	1.89
Eileen decides to host a poker night and invites everyone to her home, but Kim's erratic behavior puts everyone over the edge resulting in a fiery confrontation. Elsewhere, Yolanda spends one last night with her daughters in New York City.
97	11	"It's Just a Scratch"	January 27, 2015	2.14
The drama continues at Eileen's poker night when Kyle and Brandi get into a heated argument over Kim but things quickly take a turn for the worse and things gets physical. Lisa Vanderpump returns from her vacation. Afterwards, Lisa Rinna presides over a jewelry party for the girls, where Kyle receives shocking news about her sister Kim.
98	12	"Drama Queens"	February 3, 2015	1.73
Lisa Vanderpump is surprised when adopted son Max decides he wants to take a DNA test to discover his heritage. Brandi and Kyle both visit Kim, who has just been released from the hospital, and a session of she-said-she-said ensues. Later, Brandi shows up uninvited to Kyle's gay mixer where insults are hurled and things get ugly.
99	13	"Sister Act"	February 10, 2015	1.86
After the blow up at Kyle's gay mixer, the other women speculate about Brandi's influence over Kim. The ladies attend Eileen's movie premiere at a shopping center in the suburbs. Lisa Vanderpump is nervous when her son receives his genealogy test results. As Eileen brings the Richards sisters together to discuss their problems, Lisa Rinna questions Brandi about Kim's recent behavior.
100	14	"Surprise!"	February 17, 2015	1.78
Elieen organizes a table read for her husband's latest Hollywood script but emotions still run high between the Richards sisters. In other developments, Brandi agrees to go on a 21-day cleanse of no alcohol, yet will be tested at a birthday bash when she is tempted.
101	15	"Welcome to Amsterdam?"	February 24, 2015	1.60
Yolanda hosts a scavenger hunt around Beverly Hills, and the ladies must push aside their various issues and work together as teams but the truce doesn't last very long afterwards as the women jet off to Amsterdam for a group trip and drama between the Richards sisters continues.
102	16	"Amster-damn!"	March 3, 2015	1.81
In Amsterdam, Kyle flees an explosive dinner showdown between Kim and Lisa Rinna. Afterwards, fireworks burst between Brandi and Kyle.
103	17	"Amster-damn Slap"	March 10, 2015	1.96
The housewives continue to explore Amsterdam and split into two groups. Later, during the dinner party, all the ladies have a chance to confront each other about all the drama.
104	18	"Confessions Of A Housewife"	March 17, 2015	1.81
After Lisa V refuses to accept an apology for the slap, Brandi breaks down in a spa session with Yolanda. Returning from the trip to Amsterdam, old wounds are reopened as Kyle and Kim sit down to sort out their issues.
105	19	"The Party's Over"	March 24, 2015	1.88
The women attend an over-the-top party thrown by friend Adrienne Maloof; Lisa Vanderpump confronts Brandi about the slap delivered in Amsterdam; Kyle gets angry with Lisa Rinna for not corroborating that Brandi is worried about Kim's sobriety.
106	20	"Reunion Part I"	March 31, 2015	2.27
The reunion begins with Yolanda talking about Lyme disease and the difficulties that follow. Before Yolanda leaves the reunion, she defends her daughter against Brandi and attempts some resolution among the group. Kim and Lisa get into a debate about who has more "pride" based on the roles they choose and Brandi and Lisa Vanderpump get into an argument that leaves little hope for the future of their friendship.
107	21	"Reunion Part II"	April 7, 2015	2.13
Part two of the reunion centers on the ladies airing their grievances while reflecting on good times. Also Eileen talks about Brandi turning from fan to foe, Kim addresses her issues with the soap stars and dramas revolve around Kim and Kyle.
108	22	"Reunion Part III"	April 14, 2015	1.97
Part three concludes the reunion with Kim revealing that she received threatening texts, and deep issues plague Kyle and Kim. Also the ladies find out the housewife with the dirtiest mouth.
109	23	"Secrets Revealed"	April 21, 2015	1.30
Previously unseen clips of the ladies are revealed. Eileen mulls over winning an Emmy, Kyle's daughter wants to pursue an acting career, the women snoop into Yolanda's past and Kim confronts Lisa Rinna.
