= George Maloof =

George Maloof may refer to:

- George J. Maloof Jr. (born 1964), owner of the Sacramento Kings basketball team
- George J. Maloof Sr. (1923–1980), businessman and owner of the Houston Rockets basketball team
