= The Real Housewives of Beverly Hills season 1 =

The Real Housewives of Beverly Hills
- Season 1
- Cover used by iTunes (Left to right) Armstrong, Grammer, Vanderpump, Kyle Richards, Kim and Maloof
- Starring: Taylor Armstrong; Camille Grammer; Adrienne Maloof; Kim Richards; Kyle Richards; Lisa Vanderpump
- No. of episodes: 17

Release
- Original network: Bravo
- Original release: October 14, 2010 – February 15, 2011

Season chronology
- Next → Season 2

The first season of The Real Housewives of Beverly Hills, an American reality television series, aired on Bravo from October 14, 2010 to February 15, 2011, and is primarily filmed in Beverly Hills, California.

The season focuses on the personal and professional lives of Taylor Armstrong, Camille Grammer, Adrienne Maloof, Kim Richards, Kyle Richards and Lisa Vanderpump. The season consisted of 17 episodes. Its executive producers are Andrew Hoegl, Barrie Bernstein, Lisa Shannon, Pam Healy and Andy Cohen.

== Production and crew ==
On March 10, 2010, The Real Housewives of Beverly Hills was announced as the sixth installment in the network's The Real Housewives franchise. The first season of the show was produced by Evolution Media in association with Bravo. The Real Housewives franchise which was created by Scott Dunlop, with season one executive produced by Alex Baskin, Chris Cullen, Douglas Ross, Greg Stewart, Toni Gallagher, Dave Rupel and Andy Cohen. The Beverly Hills iteration was conceptualized to follow the personal and professional lives of several women living in Beverly Hills and the surrounding areas, showcasing their wealth, relationships, and family dynamics.

The series was announced on March 10, 2010 as the sixth installment of the franchise, with production beginning in June of that year. On August 31, 2010, the full cast, trailer, and premiere date were officially announced. The series aired between October 14, 2010 and February 15, 2011. Filming for the first season primarily took place in Beverly Hills, California, and nearby Los Angeles neighborhoods, including cast members’ homes, restaurants, retail locations, and event venues, as well as Sacramento, California; Palm Springs, California; Las Vegas, Nevada; Hawaii; and New York. Additional exterior footage was used to establish the Beverly Hills setting.

== Cast and synopsis ==
=== Cast ===
The first season of The Real Housewives of Beverly Hills introduced six women to the franchise that are described as "the most affluent women in the country," as well as describing their affluence and wealth with, "these women are in the center of it all and they have the mansions, the cars, and the diamonds to prove it."

The Real Housewives of Beverly Hills was the second series in The Real Housewives franchise to featured family members, following The Real Housewives of New Jersey, with sisters Kim and Kyle Richards. The series also includes Taylor Armstrong, Camille Grammer, Adrienne Maloof, and Lisa Vanderpump.

Taylor Armstrong moved to Beverly Hills in 2003 from her hometown of Oklahoma. She met her husband, Russell Armstrong, and together they have a daughter, Kennedy. In addition to being a wife and mom, Armstrong is a philanthropist and business woman. Armstrong founded her own SAP firm, e-Implement Inc. and volunteers for the 1736 Family Crisis Center. She has adapted the "work hard, play hard" attitude, which allows her to maintain her identity in Beverly Hills.

Camille Grammer joined the series reluctantly, revealing that her husband at the time, Kelsey Grammer, encouraged her to join the series. Grammer is regarded as a "triple threat" with experience as a model, actress, and dancer. Her career as a dancer began when she was cast on Club MTV. The Grammers were married for 13 years and together they have a daughter, Mason, and a son, Jude. The pair have mixed business with pleasure through their production company, Grammnet Inc. The production company is known for producing successful shows including; Medium, Girlfriends and The Game.

Adrienne Maloof is a businesswoman from a very affluent and successful family. She moved to Beverly Hills with her family from Albuquerque, New Mexico in 1976. Throughout the years, her family built the Maloof dynasty- sports and entertainment enterprise which includes the Sacramento Kings, Palms Casino Resort, Sweeping Palms Entertainment and the Maloof Money Cup. Maloof was married to Dr. Paul Nassif, a renowned plastic surgeon and together they have three sons; Gavin, and twins Christian and Colin.

Kim Richards is a former child actress who was once referred to as the "Disney Girl" for starring in the movies, Escape to Witch Mountain and No Deposit, No Return. Richards appeared on several television programs including; Nanny and the Professor, James at 15, Hello, Larry, Diff'rent Strokes, CHiPS and Magnum, P.I. Richards' career came to an end when she retired after starring in the feature film Tuff Turf, alongside James Spader and Robert Downey Jr. She focused her time on raising her family of four kids, Brooke, Whitney, Chad, and Kimberly. She continues to work running a jewelry and water bottle line in which proceeds go to charity.

Kyle Richards, like her sister, is also a former child actress who landed her first role in Escape to Witch Mountain alongside Kim. Richards has starred in several movies including; Halloween and The Watcher in the Woods and on television with credits including; Little House on The Prairie, Carter Country, Down to Earth and ER. When Richards isn't working, she focuses her time on being a loving wife to high-end realtor, Mauricio Umansky, and mother to her four daughters; Farrah, Alexia, Sophia, and Portia.

Lisa Vanderpump moved to Beverly Hills from Monte Carlo and the South of France, although she was born and raised in Dulwich, London. She has been married to businessman Ken Todd for 27 years, and they have two children: Pandora and an adopted son, Max. The couple's home is shared with several dogs, which they also consider part of their family. Vanderpump has a background in interior design and hospitality. In Europe, she styled homes and yachts, as well as the 26 restaurants, bars, and clubs that she and Todd owned in London. The couple brought their interest in fine dining to Beverly Hills, where they own the restaurants, Villa Blanca and SUR Restaurant & Lounge. In addition to managing the restaurants and spending time with her family, Vanderpump writes for Beverly Hills Lifestyle magazine and runs her skincare line, Epione..

=== Synopsis ===
The Real Housewives of Beverly Hills series begins with Adrienne Maloof revealing that she and her family own the professional basketball team, Sacramento Kings. Maloof intends to attend a game and invites the other wives along, her neighbor and witty British restaurateur, Lisa Vanderpump, former child actresses and sisters, Kyle and Kim Richards, a beauty from Oklahoma, Taylor Armstrong and the soon-to-be ex-wife of renown actor Kelsey Grammer, Camille Grammer. The women all fly via private jet to get a VIP treatment, court-side at the game.

Kim finds herself arguing with her sister, Kyle, at their family vacation home after being accused of having no life outside of her children. The conflict later escalates during Kim's daughter's birthday at a spa. Tensions between the two sisters continues to worsen, after Kim refuses to stand up for Kyle in New York City against Grammer. The two sister's reach an explosive point in their relationship at a rooftop party for Armstrong's birthday. Kim accuses Kyle of stealing her house and Kyle calls Kim out for being an alcoholic.

Kyle and her husband decide to take a trip to the Napa Valley for an intense charity bike ride, but debate whether to take their daughters or not. Kyle hosts her annual white party with the ladies in attendance, but Armstrong's issues with her husband take center stage. Kyle is emotional when her daughter Farrah reaches a milestone in life when graduating from college. Kyle is left saddened by her nieces, Paris and Nicky Hilton, choice of a trip to Europe over attending the graduation.

Grammer who is alone in Beverly Hills is elated by a trip to the Palms Casino Resort, but she soon butts heads with Kyle with the fight continuing back in Beverly Hills. In her home in Hawaii, Grammer opens up about her marriage. Grammer invites all the ladies to her husband's Broadway musical in New York, but Kyle is worried from what happened between her and Grammer in Las Vegas. All goes well until they all sit down for dinner and the truth comes out. Grammer decides to take up some retail therapy, but soon goes on overdrive after learning her husband is nominated for a Tony Award and decides to buy some expensive dresses. The distance between her and her husband grows apart even further after Kelsey reveals he wants to stay in New York, as his career in Los Angeles is over and he feels more appreciated there. Grammer isn't keen on the idea of moving to New York as her home is in Beverly Hills. Later, the drama between Grammer and Kyle escalates at Grammer's Malibu home when she hosts a dinner party. In attendance is Allison DuBois, a psychic and Grammer's friend. DuBois stuns everyone at the table after telling revealing what she sees in Kyle's future. Kelsey continues to spend time in New York which leaves Grammer realizing the crack in their marriage. Grammer's relationship later worsen when Kelsey reveals he wants to end their marriage.

After Armstrong and Richards rejected a joint party plan, Armstrong spends $60,000 on an over-the-top, Mad Hatter inspired tea-party for her daughter Kennedy's birthday on Saturday, February 27, 2010, but she is soon upstaged by her husband when he buys their daughter a puppy. Meanwhile, Kyle Richards spent $12,000, one-fifth of the total for her daughter Portia’s birthday on Sunday, February 28, the same day as USA-Canada ice hockey gold medal game. Armstrong speaks at a charity poker tournament, with Maloof attendance for support, she reveals that she is a child of domestic violence. Armstrong hosts a costume party inspired by the roaring twenties era. Everyone is left feeling anxious at the party when Grammer and Kyle come face-to-face for the first time since the blow-up at Grammer's home in Malibu. Armstrong's marital issues continues after Kyle's white party, she looks for ways to resolve them.

Maloof heads to Las Vegas for a photo shoot with at hot model, but bringing her husband Paul doesn't end up being a good idea. In Vegas, Maloof invites the rest of the ladies to the Palms Casino Resort to see Jay-Z perform.

Vanderpump receives a sentimental gift for her birthday from her husband, two children and her house-guest, Cedric Martinez who she views as a son. Vanderpump witnessing the drama attempts to lighten the mood of the group by setting Kim up on a date with her millionaire friend. Vanderpump helps Cedric get his license, but is surprised at the type of people at the DMV. Vanderpump hosts a charity event for burn victim at her restaurant Villa Blanca, but Grammer decides not to attend due to her drama with Kyle. Vanderpump supports Cedric after a shocking relation of his past involving his family and his journey to the states.

== Reception ==
=== U.S. television ratings ===
The Real Housewives of Beverly Hills premiered to 1.5 total million viewers and the series' ratings continued to grow, attracting 3.7 million viewers between the 9 p.m. and 10 p.m. airings for the January 13, 2011 episode "Turn, Turn, Turn", making it the number one telecast among adults 18–49 versus all cable competition in the time slot.

The finale of The Real Housewives of Beverly Hills season 1, that aired on January 20, 2011, became the highest-rated episode of the season with 4.2 million viewers, when combined with multiple evening reruns. The Real Housewives of Beverly Hills' first season ranked as the second highest rated first season series of the Real Housewives franchise ever in all demographics, averaging 2.42 million total viewers and 1.71 million adults 18–49.

=== Awards ===
In 2011, The Real Housewives of Beverley Hills won a Critics Choice Award, in a tie with Hoarders, for best reality series.

== Episodes ==
The Real Housewives of Beverly Hills season 1 episodes
No. overall	No. in season	Title	Original release date	U.S. viewers (millions)
1	1	"Life, Liberty and the Pursuit of Wealthiness"	October 14, 2010	1.53
This new edition of Bravo's "Real Housewives" franchise focuses on 6 women living in Beverly Hills. The premiere introduces Kyle Richards and Kim Richards, sisters and former child stars; Adrienne Maloof, a professional businesswoman married to a plastic surgeon; Lisa Vanderpump, a British-born restaurateur; Taylor Armstrong, an Oklahoma native married to an entrepreneur; and Camille Grammer, model/actress and, at the time of filming, wife of actor Kelsey Grammer. In this episode, Adrienne takes her fellow wives on a private-jet getaway to a Sacramento Kings game but Kim gives Taylor the cold shoulder. Kyle has an argument with her sister Kim and Kim is upset when Kyle leaves in a huff.
2	2	"Chocolate Louboutins"	October 21, 2010	1.42
3	3	"Plenty of Baggage"	October 28, 2010	1.23
4	4	"It's My Party and I'll Spend If I Want To"	November 4, 2010	1.87
5	5	"I Would Never Say That"	November 11, 2010	1.75
6	6	"The Art of War"	November 18, 2010	1.82
7	7	"My Mansion Is Bigger Than Your Mansion"	December 2, 2010	2.02
8	8	"Charity Cases"	December 9, 2010	1.91
9	9	"The Dinner Party From Hell"	December 16, 2010	2.17
Camille invites the wives for a dinner party at her house. She invites her friend Allison DuBois while Kyle brings her friend Faye Resnick. Allison starts getting drunk and starts to piss off Taylor, Kyle, Lisa, Adrienne and Faye. Allison starts attacking Kyle's marriage and when Faye defends Kyle, the fighting starts and the dinner party turns into "a few clowns short of a circus". Allison acts like a mean girl and continues to attack Kyle's personal life. Kyle and Camille starts fighting again and Kim adds fuel to the fire by dragging Taylor into another argument. Taylor puts an end to it and the ladies storm out. Outside Camille's house, Kyle confronts Kim about starting conflict with Taylor. Meanwhile, Allison makes some outrageous comments about Kyle to Camille. In the limo on the way home, the ladies discuss the real reason Camille brought Allison.
10	10	"Payback's a Bitch... Just Ask Your Husband"	December 23, 2010	1.81
At a charity event Lisa's hosting, Kyle gets a text from Camille saying that she and Kelsey will no longer be working with Kyle's realtor husband Mauricio because of Kyle's perceived attacks on Camille. Taylor and Kim get together to try to patch things up after the blowup at Camille's house. Cedric and Lisa attend Taylor's "Roaring 20's Party" in drag while Camille and Kyle make up and vow to put their past fights behind them.
11	11	"How to Behave"	January 6, 2011	2.16
Camille invites Adrienne, Kyle, and their families to a tennis-and-swimming get-together, and all goes well. At Lisa's daughter's birthday party, Cedric tells of his childhood living on the streets of Paris and in foster homes until his teens when Lisa took him in. Also, Kyle hosts a "White Party" birthday bash for Mauricio, but Taylor and Russell's marital issues are highlighted when Russell leaves early. Camille attends the party and, allegedly as a joke, gives Kyle a book called "How to Behave and Why".
12	12	"Turn, Turn, Turn"	January 13, 2011	2.31
Lisa finds herself on the outs of Kyle and Taylor's growing friendship. Kim indicates she wants to get back into acting now that her children are grown. Camille hosts a party for friends in LA, but doesn't tell them that Kelsey called her to say he wanted a divorce. Instead, she goes to New York City to join Kelsey at the Tony Awards. On the way to a winery, Lisa's husband Ken tells Cedric he needs to move out, but Cedric hesitates because of unresolved issues with his childhood. Kyle is preoccupied with her daughter Farrah's college graduation.
13	13	"Unforgivable"	January 20, 2011	2.76
Kyle visits her psychic to discuss problems she's been having with Kim. At a lunch, Lisa questions Taylor about what she said to Camille before the fight in New York City, but Taylor says she only has a problem with Kim. Lisa and Ken finally ask Cedric to move out, but he is reluctant to leave. At Russell's 39th-birthday party for Taylor, the birthday girl confronts Kim about New York, which spirals into an argument between a (somewhat drunk) Kim and the rest of the housewives. Camille, still trying to recover from the heartbreak of Kelsey dumping her, does not attend Taylor's party. After the fight, Kim attempts to leave the party and Adrienne tries to advise her on how to mend her relationship with Kyle, but Kyle gets into the limo with her daughter Portia sleeping in her arms, Kim calls her a liar, and Kyle calls Kim "sick" and "an alcoholic" and vows to stop supporting her.
14	14	"Reunion: Part 1"	January 27, 2011	2.55
The girls sit down to dish what happened this season.
15	15	"Reunion: Part 2"	February 1, 2011	2.69
The girls sit down to dish what happened this season. The husbands join for this part, with Lisa's husband Ken sharing his real feelings about Cedric.
16	16	"The Lost Footage"	February 8, 2011	1.60
Unseen moments from the first season.
17	17	"Dinner Party From Hell: Producers Cut"	February 15, 2011	1.12
The extended version of the Dinner Party from hell with unseen footage and new interviews.

== Aftermath ==
In August 2011, following the conclusion of the first season and during the production for the second season, Russell Armstrong, who had been featured alongside his wife Taylor, died by suicide. His death occurred one month after Taylor publicly accused Armstrong of emotional and physical abuse. At the time of his death, Armstrong owed more than $1.5 million in debt and was living month to month to support his lifestyle. In a public statement, his lawyer blamed pressure to keep up with the show for his death, claiming "the weekly social events, the dinners and all the BS, trying to pretend you have unlimited resources in Beverly Hills is tough. When every night is a potential sound bite or posting on a website, you end up getting addicted to it, you go out all the time." The news received widespread media coverage and significantly impacted the series and its cast.

Bravo delayed the season 2 premiere in response to Armstrong's death and re-edited episodes containing depictions of Armstrong and his marriage with Taylor. Armstrong’s death and the circumstances surrounding it were addressed during the second season, with content warnings included prior to episodes that discussed domestic violence. The incident marked one of the most serious real-world consequences associated with the Real Housewives franchise.
