= Adrienne Maloof =

American businesswoman and television personality

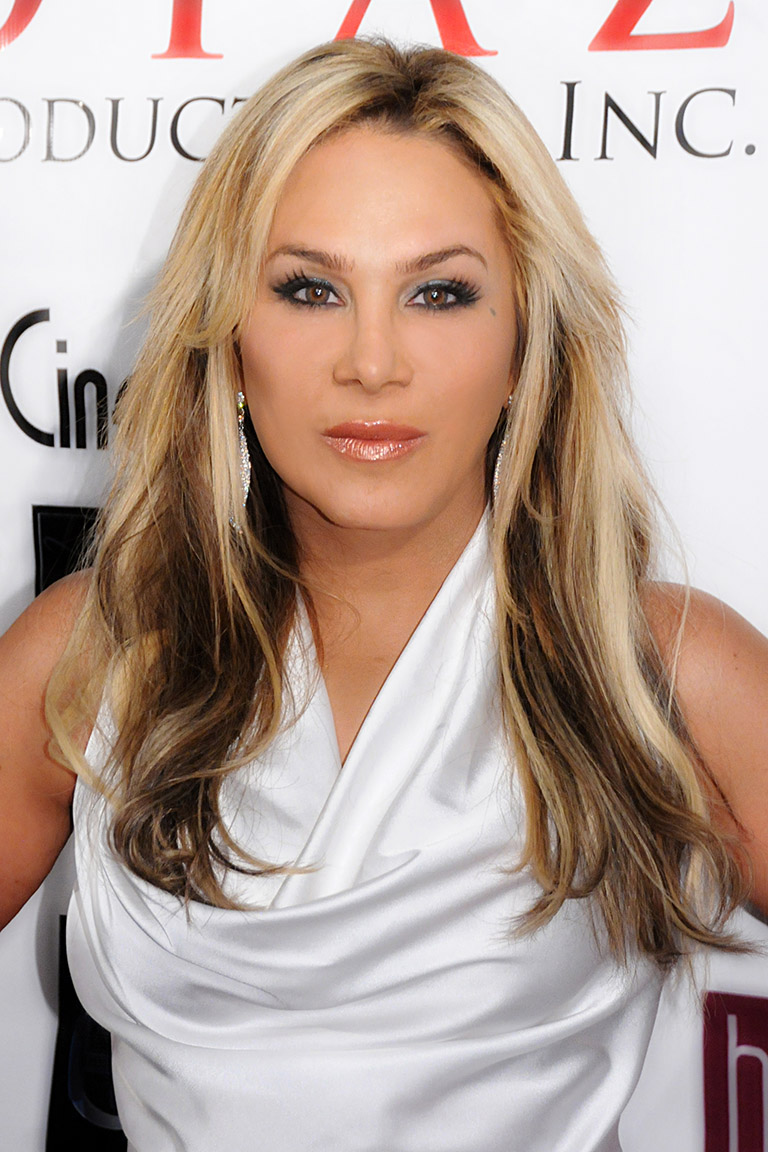
- Maloof in 2014
- Born: September 4, 1961 (age 65); Albuquerque, New Mexico, U.S.
- Education: University of New Mexico (BA)
- Occupations: Businesswoman, television personality
- Years active: 2005–present
- Organization: Maloof Companies
- Television: The Real Housewives of Beverly Hills
- Spouse: Paul Nassif (m. 2002; div. 2012)
- Children: 3
- Parent(s): George J. Maloof Sr. Colleen Maloof
- Relatives: George J. Maloof Jr. (brother)

Adrienne Maloof (born September 4, 1961) is an American businesswoman, television personality, shoe designer, and co-owner of the various business holdings of Maloof Companies, which include a stake in the Vegas Golden Knights (NHL), The Palms Casino Resort in Las Vegas, Nevada; Maloof Productions, Maloof Music and the retired Maloof Money Cup skateboarding event.

== Early life and education ==
Adrienne Maloof is of Lebanese and Irish heritage. A member of the Maloof family, she is the third child and only daughter of billionaire entrepreneur George J. Maloof Sr., whose wife Colleen co-owns the holdings of the Maloof Companies with Adrienne and her brothers, George J. Maloof Jr., Joe Maloof, Gavin Maloof, and Phil Maloof. She was born on September 4, 1961, in Albuquerque, New Mexico, where her father owned a Coors beer distributorship. She attended the University of New Mexico on a full scholarship as a tennis player, where she earned a degree in political science and was a member of Pi Beta Phi sorority.

== Career ==
After working in the marketing and promotions department of the Maloof family's liquor and wine business, her role grew to encompass the interests of all Maloof Companies and she has continued to control much of the Maloof Companies' marketing operations for more than twenty years. She is also involved in setting customer service standards for all Maloof Companies, including brother George Jr.'s Palms Casino Resort in Las Vegas, and she has produced many of Maloof Productions' projects, including the 2005 horror film Feast.

She was a cast member for the first three seasons of Bravo's The Real Housewives of Beverly Hills, part of the network's Real Housewives series, alongside Kim and Kyle Richards, Camille Grammer, Lisa Vanderpump, Brandi Glanville, and Taylor Armstrong. On March 4, 2013, Maloof announced she would be leaving the TV series, but has made guest appearances in the series' fifth, sixth, eighth, and tenth season.

In December 2011, she released Adrienne Maloof by Charles Jourdan, a small shoe collection produced by Charles Jourdan.

== Philanthropy ==
Outside of work, Maloof dedicates much of her time to philanthropy. She has supported numerous charities, including School On Wheels, Good News Foundation, and Camp Kindness program with the Sacramento SPCA.

== Personal life ==
On May 2, 2002, she married otolaryngologist Paul Nassif, who specializes in facial surgery—specifically rhinoplasty. The couple have three sons, including one set of twins. They resided in Beverly Park, a gated community in Los Angeles. Nassif filed for separation from her on July 30, 2012. The papers, filed in Los Angeles Superior Court, cited irreconcilable differences as the reason for the separation. On November 8, 2012, their divorce was settled. On January 22, 2013, Maloof confirmed that she was formally dating Sean Stewart—son of British rocker Rod Stewart. Maloof rented Tom Gores' house in Mulholland Estates in 2012, and it was purchased by Christina Aguilera in 2013.

== Filmography ==
Film and television roles
Year	Title	Role	Notes
2010–2017, 2020	The Real Housewives of Beverly Hills	Herself	72 episodes; Main role: seasons 1–3, guest: 5–6, 8 and 10
2011	Miss Universe 2011	Herself	Judge; Television special
2015	Chocolate City	Herself	Uncredited
2016	Hell's Kitchen	Herself	Restaurant Patron; Episode: "Don't Tell My Fiance"
2021	Million Dollar Listing Los Angeles	Herself	Episode: "9021 No!"
2022	Gown and Out in Beverly Hills	Herself	2 episodes
2026	The Real Housewives of Atlanta	Herself	Episode: "Dynasty Divas in Atlanta"
2026	The Real Housewives Ultimate Girls Trip	Herself	Episode: "Roaring 20th: White Lies"

Production credits
Year	Title	Role	Notes
2005	Feast	Executive producer	Film
2019	Short Notice	Executive producer	Music video by Ochoa Boyz
