= Mike Walker (columnist) =

American radio personality (1946–2018)

- Born: January 16, 1946
- Died: February 16, 2018 (aged 72)
- Occupations: Gossip columnist, radio personality
- Website: www.thegossipgame.com

Mike Walker (January 16, 1946 – February 16, 2018) was an American radio personality and gossip columnist for The National Enquirer, and hosted the magazine's 1999–2001 MGM-produced newsmagazine, National Enquirer TV. He was also the author of the 2005 book, Rather Dumb: A Top Tabloid Reporter Tells CBS How to Do News.

Between April 11, 1996 and December 2010, Walker was a guest every week on The Howard Stern Show to play "The Gossip Game." He would read four gossip stories, and the Stern crew guessed which one is false.

Walker co-wrote with Faye Resnick the #1 New York Times best-selling book about the O.J. Simpson murder trial, Nicole Brown Simpson: Private Diary of a Life Interrupted (1994) (which as of October 1995, had reportedly sold 550,000 copies). It debuted at #1 on the non-fiction side of the Times Best Seller list on November 6, 1994.

Walker had a weekly radio show on KABC, Los Angeles, California.

Walker grew up in Boston and started working for the Enquirer in 1970.

On February 16, 2018, writer A. J. Benza tweeted that Walker had died.
