= National Enquirer TV =

American news television program

- Also known as: National Enquirer's Uncovered (season 2)
- Genre: Infotainment
- Presented by: Mike Walker; Susan Campos (first half of Season 1); James Hill (second half of Season 1); Jack Maxwell (Season 2)
- Country of origin: United States
- Original language: English
- No. of seasons: 2
- No. of episodes: TBA

Production
- Executive producers: Dennis Bogorad; David Wyler
- Producer: TBA
- Running time: 30 min
- Production companies: Bogorad/Wyler Productions; MGM Domestic Television Distribution

Original release
- Network: Syndication
- Release: August 30, 1999 – July 6, 2001

National Enquirer TV was a 30-minute newsmagazine show starring National Enquirer magazine columnist Mike Walker. The show debuted on August 30, 1999 in many markets.

In season 1, Mike's co host in the first half was former KABC-TV morning anchor Susan Campos. In the 2nd half of the 1st season, Campos was joined by current WOLO-TV anchor James Hill.

In season 2, National Enquirer TV changed its name to National Enquirer's Uncovered, and the show's host was former Sunset Beach actor Jack Maxwell. On the show, every episode includes Walker's Planet Gossip with its daily gossip on the day's news. Walker always ends his commentary with "And now you know it all, almost!"

The show's last first-run episode was aired on July 6, 2001.

== In popular culture ==
The television series Second City Television predicted National Enquirer TV in a 1983 skit focusing on an episode of 'National Midnight Star TV' which tackled many of the same stories. This was 16 years before National Enquirer launched the television show.
