= Maloof family =

Business family

Maloof
- Current region: Western United States
- Earlier spellings: Maalouf
- Origin: Lebanon
- Members: George J. Maloof Sr. Adrienne Maloof; George J. Maloof Jr.
- Distinctions: Entertainment industry

The Maloof family is a prominent American family based in Las Vegas, Nevada, who are owners of numerous business properties in the Western United States. The original spelling of the family name is Maalouf. The family is of Lebanese descent.

Originally from New Mexico, the family's success began with the distribution rights for Coors Brewing Company in the Southwest region of the US in 1937. The Maloofs were the owners of the Sacramento Kings of the National Basketball Association (NBA) from 1998 until 2013 and are minority owners of the Vegas Golden Knights of the National Hockey League (NHL). Notable family members include George J. Maloof Sr., Adrienne Maloof, George J. Maloof Jr., and Phillip Maloof.

== Sports ==
=== Basketball ===
The Maloof family owned the NBA's Houston Rockets from 1979 to 1982, and the Rockets made the NBA Finals in 1981 before the team was sold to Charlie Thomas in 1982.

The family also owned the Sacramento Kings from 1998 until 2013. The Maloofs acquired a minority interest in the Kings in 1998 and took majority control the following year, with Joe and Gavin operating the franchise. As part of the purchase of the Kings, they also acquired the team's sister franchise in the WNBA, the Sacramento Monarchs. The Maloofs operated the Monarchs until 2009, when the WNBA was unable to find a new owner and the team folded. In 2013, the family sold its 65% stake in the Kings for $347 million (a $534 million valuation) to a Sacramento group led by Vivek Ranadive that was committed to building a new arena in downtown Sacramento that had previously been rebuked by the Maloofs.

Prior to the sale of the team, a deal had been reached to sell the Kings to Microsoft CEO Steve Ballmer and investor Chris Hansen, who hoped to move the team to Seattle. This sale was nullified on May 15, 2013, when the NBA Board of Governors denied the relocation in a vote of 22–8.

==== Attempts to sell the Kings ====
A proposal to build a new arena at California Exposition (the State Fairgrounds), which would include an upgrade to the fairgrounds as well as retail and housing developments was presented and accepted by the Cal Expo Board of Directors on February 27, 2009, but fell apart soon after, leaving Sacramento without a new arena.

In late 2010, the Maloof family began negotiating with officials in Anaheim, California in an effort to move the Kings franchise to that city, despite repeated assurances that the team would stay in Sacramento. On March 29, 2011, the City of Anaheim approved bond measures aimed at assisting the Kings move. In June 2011, the Maloof brothers, Joe and Gavin, sold a majority share of the Palms to two lending companies (Leonard Green & Partners LP in Los Angeles and TPG Capital in Texas), allowing them to move forward with building their arena.

Upon the news of a possible relocation, the Sacramento Kings launched a grassroots effort with pledges of over $800,000 to go to a new arena. This and other grassroots efforts, along with mayor Kevin Johnson's presentation to the NBA Board of Governors, convinced the NBA to delay any relocation authorization for one year. Within this one-year time frame, a completed arena plan, with funding, was required to be in place by March 2012. Plans were approved by the City Council on March 6, 2012. Finally, on May 2, 2012, the NBA put a halt to the move to Anaheim, California.

Although the city had approved plans to build a new arena in downtown Sacramento, in February 2013, the Maloofs agreed to sell the Sacramento Kings to a group led by Chris Hansen and Steve Ballmer, who promised to relocate the team to Seattle and rename them the Seattle SuperSonics. Kevin Johnson brought a new ownership group together, led by Vivek Ranadivé, to keep the team in Sacramento. On May 15, 2013, the NBA Board of Governors denied the relocation bid, effectively nullifying the sale to the Seattle group. The following day, the Maloofs agreed to sell the team to the Sacramento group.

During the months leading up to the sale, the Seattle group raised its offer twice, and it was reported that the Maloofs would refuse to sell to the Sacramento group. At one point, the Chris Hansen group had offered to buy 20% of the team with the Maloofs retaining their majority ownership, even after the Sacramento group came together with an offer. However, Sacramento continued to work directly with the NBA, and the Maloofs' sale to the Sacramento group eventually went through.

Finally, construction for the Kings' new arena, the Golden 1 Center, began on October 29, 2014, and was completed prior to the start of the 2016-17 NBA season.

=== Hockey ===
The Maloofs are also the minority owners of the Vegas Golden Knights of the NHL, who made it to the Stanley Cup Finals in their inaugural season.

== Las Vegas ==
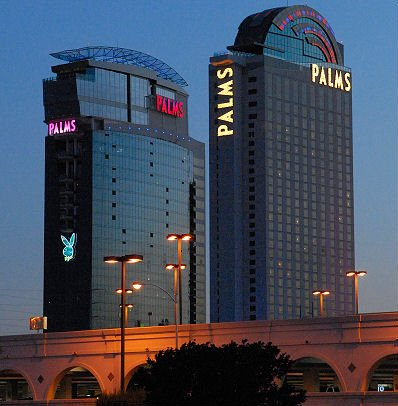
Palms Casino Resort

In 1994, the Maloof family opened the Fiesta Rancho hotel-casino in North Las Vegas, and sold it in 2000 for over $185 million. The money was reinvested into the creation of the Palms Casino Resort hotel and casino.

The Maloofs sold their beer distribution in an unsuccessful attempt to save the Palms and Palms Towers. In 2011 a restructuring gave private equity firms TPG Inc. and Leonard Green & Partners each a 49% share, leaving the Maloofs with 2% ownership.

== Maloof Productions ==
The Maloofs have expanded their business ventures into entertainment with the creation of Maloof Productions. Through its television division, Maloof Television, they have produced the reality series Bullrun for Spike TV in 2007, Speed Channel in 2009, and Living Lohan, the E! reality series running in 2008. In 2008 the family was developing Rebuilding the Kingdom with reality television producer Mark Burnett.

The film division, Maloof Motion Pictures, produced the 2005 film Feast and as of 2007 was developing The Big Bizarro, starring Pierce Brosnan.

== Skateboarding ==
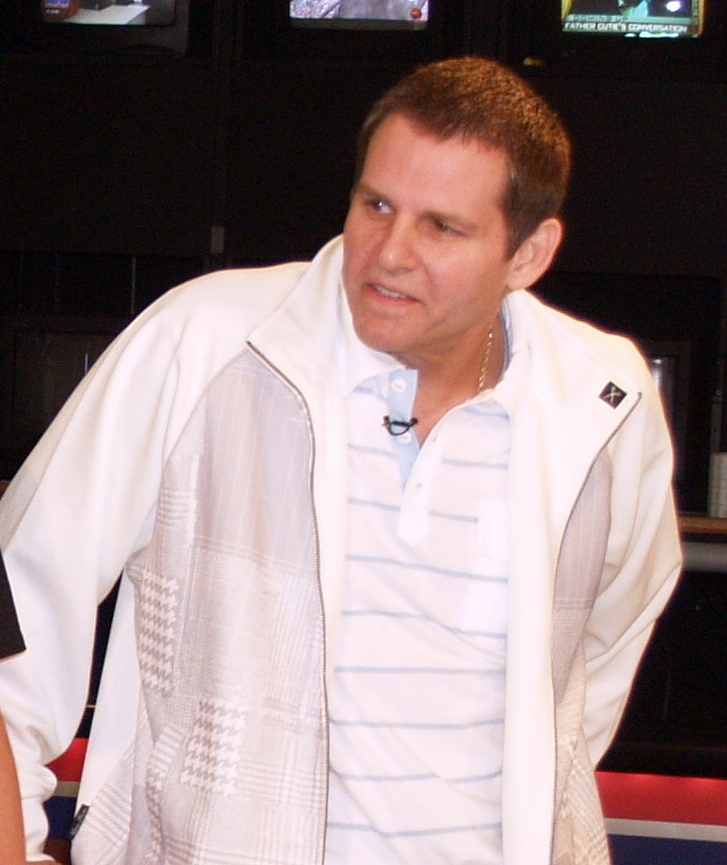
Joe Maloof in San Diego promoting the Maloof Money Cup

Founded in 2008 by Joe and Gavin Maloof, the Maloof Money Cup was a competition for both professional and amateur skateboarders. The Orange County, US, dates of the contest series include the US Pro Men's and Women's Street Championships, the US Pro Vert Championships, and the Maloof Money Cup AM Championships.

A spring New York date and a fall South Africa date were added in 2010 and 2011 respectively. In 2012, the Maloofs focused on the South African event, entitled the Maloof Money Cup World Skateboarding Championships, and canceled the Orange County event due to logistical issues.

The Maloof family is also one of the main sponsors of the game Skate 3, offering a slew of different competitions.

== Family members ==
Formerly headed by George J. Maloof Sr., and now by his wife Colleen, the family includes the following children:

- Joe Maloof (born November 15, 1955)
- Gavin Maloof (born October 9, 1956)
- Adrienne Maloof (born September 4, 1961)
- George J. Maloof Jr. (born September 2, 1964)
- Phillip Maloof (born May 16, 1967). A New Mexico state senator in the late 1990s, ran unsuccessfully against Heather Wilson for New Mexico's 1st congressional district in 1998.

Albert Maloof Sr., a cousin of George J. Maloof Sr., is best known for his distribution business in the Southeastern United States.

== In popular culture ==
- The Maloofs sponsor skateboard video game competitions in Skate 3. In addition, the Maloof Money Cup itself appears in Skate 3 as well as downloadable content for Skate 2
- The Maloofs frequently appeared on the television show Las Vegas.
- Phil Maloof owns the console of the Barton organ installed at Chicago Stadium.
- The Maloof brothers made a cameo in Lil Wayne's music video "Lollipop", which was filmed at Gavin Maloof's multimillion-dollar mansion in the Southern Highlands Golf Club, Las Vegas.
- They also make an appearance in Ludacris' music video, "What Them Girls Like".
- On March 28, 2010, Gavin appeared as a guest judge on Celebrity Apprentice 3, filling in for Ivanka Trump.
- George Maloof Jr. made several appearances on The Girls Next Door starring Hugh Hefner, Holly Madison, Bridget Marquardt, and Kendra Wilkinson.
- Adrienne Maloof appeared in Bravo's The Real Housewives of Beverly Hills.

Sporting positions
Preceded by Jim Thomas	Sacramento Kings principal owner 1999–2013; Served alongside: Robert Hernreich	Succeeded by Vivek Ranadivé
