= Faye Resnick =

American TV personality (born 1957)

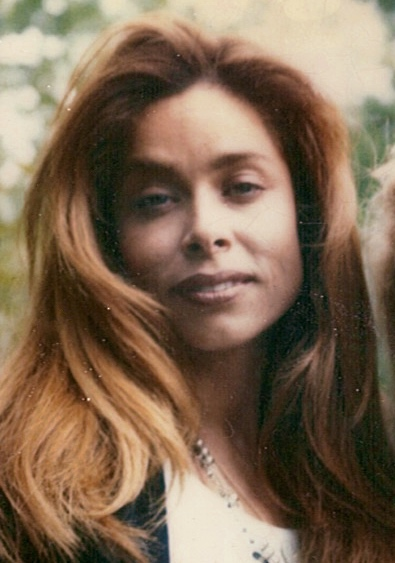
- Resnick in 1994
- Born: Faye Denise Hutchison; July 3, 1957 (age 69); Brentwood, California, U.S.
- Occupations: Television personality; author; interior designer
- Years active: 1994–present
- Known for: Involvement in the O.J. Simpson murder trial
- Television: The Real Housewives of Beverly Hills
- Spouses: Fadi Halabi (m. 1984; div. 1986) Paul Resnick (m. 1987; div. 1991) Everett Jack Jr. (m. 2015)
- Children: 1
- Website: fayeresnick.com

Faye Denise Resnick (née Hutchison; born July 3, 1957) is an American television personality, author, and interior designer. She is best known for her involvement in the O. J. Simpson murder trial and for her appearance on the reality television series The Real Housewives of Beverly Hills.

== Early life ==
Faye Resnick was born July 3, 1957.

Resnick claimed her father regularly beat her for wetting the bed when she was a child (a Los Angeles Times article published on October 20, 1994 indicated it was her stepfather who beat her, escalating from spankings when she was a youngster to "hideous beatings" as she matured). According to Resnick, her mother ignored her husband's rampages. Her mother worked a day job as a nurse and was a budding journalist at night. She ultimately became a successful columnist who wrote about holistic medicine, and later became a Jehovah's Witness, making Faye's childhood "even more chaotic". Resnick "describes her mother as a religious fanatic whose predictions that Armageddon would come in 1975 prompted Ms. Resnick to rush into her first sexual encounter beforehand". Resnick—then Faye Hutchison—left home to live with an aunt in the Bay Area, where "she was crowned 1975 Maid of Hayward, a moment captured in a newspaper photograph showing her on the verge of tears. It was a beginning of sorts because it gave what Resnick described as 'both an ego boost and some career ideas.'"

Resnick claims she attended law courses at a community college, although there is no record of this, and later became the director of a John Robert Powers finishing and modeling school. However, the organization has no record of her employment. She is a former manicurist.

== Personal life ==
Resnick has been married four times, and gave birth to one daughter, Francesca, as People reported in November 1994:

In the early '80s, after a failed first marriage, Resnick moved to London to pursue a modeling career and married Fadi Halabi, whom she calls an eccentric heir, and they had a daughter, Francesca, now 10. She eventually divorced Halabi, and in 1986 she moved to Los Angeles and married Resnick, an entrepreneur, the following year. (They divorced in 1991.)

The Resnicks paid $1.3 million for a home formerly owned by Walt Disney Company chairman Michael Eisner, and Faye became active in activities associated with the Beverly Hills School District, where Francesca attended elementary school, such as the Beverly Hills P.T.A. During the 1990–91 academic year, she served on the board of the Beverly Hills Education Foundation; obtaining that position required a minimum donation of $1,000 and recognition as a school activist. At that time, David Margolick of The New York Times News Service reported that "She also became addicted to drugs".

Faye and Paul Resnick, a wealthy hotel refurbisher, divorced amicably in 1991. Faye's settlement netted her a payout of $194,000. His daughter Jackie stated in 1995: Faye "was the absolute worst of his [five] nightmare ex-wives. She put a great strain on our relationship." Since then, Jackie has publicly stated that she wrongfully blamed Faye for the strained relationship she had with her father at the time, and that she has great love and respect for Faye.

Resnick, an admitted cocaine addict, attended multiple drug rehabilitation programs in the eight years preceding November 1994. Consequently, although she maintained that she was sober at the time her book was published, her past drug use led some to question her credibility and motives and the defense team in O. J. Simpson's murder trial to allege that Nicole Brown Simpson and Ronald Goldman were executed by drug dealers to whom Resnick owed money in an attempt to scare her.

=== Friendship with Nicole Brown Simpson ===
Resnick and Nicole Brown Simpson, the ex-wife of former NFL player and actor O. J. Simpson, first met in 1990. According to Robert Kardashian, Resnick only knew Brown for a year and a half. The two socialized in and around Brentwood, Los Angeles and vacationed in Mexico together.

Resnick's third husband, Paul, reported that a concerned Brown called him in early June 1994 to report that "Faye was getting out of control" and abusing cocaine again. Resnick stayed for several days at Brown's condominium until on June 9, 1994, Brown and several other friends conducted an intervention and persuaded Resnick to check into the Exodus Recovery Center in Marina Del Rey, California. Three days later, Brown and her friend, waiter Ronald Goldman, were murdered.

== Books ==
Resnick collaborated on two books connected to the O. J. Simpson murder trial:

- Nicole Brown Simpson: The Private Diary of a Life Interrupted (1994, with gossip columnist for The National Enquirer, Mike Walker) reveals information unflattering to Nicole Brown Simpson (and Resnick) and has been panned by some detractors as a roman à clef. The Los Angeles Times termed it "the first of the major O.J. Simpson books to hit the shelves" and noted it was a best-seller. New York magazine dubbed it "the best-selling apotheosis of trashiness". The president of Dove Books, Michael A. Viner, said Resnick received a six-figure advance for her literary effort, which was rushed to stores in an unusually voluminous first press run of about 750,000 hardcover copies.
- Shattered: In the Eye of the Storm (1996, with Jeanne V. Bell) describes Resnick's experiences with the O. J. Simpson trial and her views of both opposing legal teams. The L.A. Times termed it "a New Age nonfiction work about women who suffer domestic violence and their journey toward recovery", and cited as her literary influence New Age author Marianne Williamson.

== Media appearances ==
Resnick posed nude for Playboy magazine in March 1997, appearing on the cover of the American issue and in interior photos, and she has participated in multiple interviews about the photo spread.

She has also appeared in multiple episodes of The Real Housewives of Beverly Hills as a friend of cast member Kyle Richards. Her most infamous appearance is in season one, when she engages in an argument with Camille Grammer and Alison Dubois at Grammer's dinner party. It was later dubbed, by many cast members, as the dinner party from hell. During this dinner, she was referred to by Grammer as "the morally corrupt Faye Resnick". Cast member Lisa Vanderpump referred to her as "Faye Rancid" during one episode.

Faye also appeared in Season 10, Episode 6 of Keeping Up with the Kardashians entitled, "Don't Panic", as a guest at her friend Kris Jenner's birthday party in Las Vegas.

Faye appeared again in Keeping Up with the Kardashians for Season 12, Episode 3 entitled, "Significant Others and Significant Brothers". In this episode, she uses her skills as an interior designer to help her friend Kris Jenner decorate her son's new house. The decor is in a style that Jenner's daughter Kourtney Kardashian questions as being too feminine.

She was portrayed by actress Connie Britton in the 2016 television series American Crime Story: The People vs. O. J. Simpson which is based on the O. J. Simpson trial.
