= George J. Maloof Sr. =

American businessman and sports team owner (1923–1980)

- Born: April 11, 1923; Las Vegas, New Mexico, U.S.
- Died: November 29, 1980 (aged 57); Albuquerque, New Mexico, U.S.
- Occupation: Businessman
- Spouse: Colleen Maloof
- Children: Adrienne Maloof; Phil Maloof; Joe Maloof; Gavin Maloof; George J. Maloof Jr.
- Parent: Joseph Maloof

George Joseph Maloof Sr. (April 11, 1923 – November 29, 1980) was an American heir and businessman of Lebanese descent.

== Biography ==
=== Early life ===
George Joseph Maloof Sr. was born on April 11, 1923, in Las Vegas, New Mexico. His father, Joseph Maloof (1903–1957), an immigrant from Lebanon, was a Coors beer distributor in New Mexico.

=== Career ===
Taking over after his father suffered a heart attack in 1944, Maloof expanded the family's business into hotels, trucking and banking. He later became the owner of the Houston Rockets.

=== Personal life ===
He married Colleen Maloof. They had five children:

- Joe Maloof (born November 15, 1955)
- Gavin Maloof (born October 9, 1956)
- Adrienne Maloof (born September 4, 1961)
- George J. Maloof Jr. (born September 2, 1964)
- Phillip Maloof (born May 16, 1967).

=== Death ===
He died on November 29, 1980, at Presbyterian Hospital in Albuquerque, New Mexico. After his death, his sisters sued to force a liquidation of the family's holdings. Business Week estimated the family's net worth in 2000 to be more than $1 billion.

== See also ==
- Maloof family
