= School on Wheels Inc. =

U.S. non-profit organization

School on Wheels
- Abbreviation: SOW
- Formation: 1993
- Type: GPO
- Headquarters: Ventura, California
- Location: Southern California
- Region served: Los Angeles, Orange, San Bernardino, Santa Barbara and Ventura counties
- Executive Director: Catherine Meek
- Key people: Agnes Stevens
- Volunteers: <1000
- Website: schoolonwheels.org

School on Wheels is a non-profit 501(c)(3) organization dedicated to tutoring children experiencing homelessness in California. School on Wheels volunteers tutor children between kindergarten and twelfth grade.

== History ==
In 1993, School on Wheels was founded by Agnes Stevens, a former school teacher. Her work began with tutoring homeless children in Santa Monica Park as a response to a rising homeless population. Presently, the organization provides tutoring for students without homes in Los Angeles, Orange, San Bernardino, Santa Barbara, and Ventura counties.

The organization has expanded over the years and saw an increase of affected populations during the COVID-19 pandemic, beginning in 2020. During the pandemic the organization worked with students and their families with resources and academic support.

== Staff ==
The School on Wheels staff consists of full-time workers and thousands of volunteers. The organization also has an executive board.
