= George J. Maloof Jr. =

American entrepreneur and businessman (born 1964)

- Born: George Joseph Maloof Jr. September 2, 1964 (age 62); Albuquerque, New Mexico, U.S.
- Education: University of Nevada, Las Vegas
- Occupations: Entrepreneur, businessman
- Parent: George J. Maloof Sr.
- Relatives: Adrienne Maloof (sister)

George Joseph Maloof Jr. (born September 2, 1964) is an American entrepreneur and businessman. He is the former owner of the Sacramento Kings, the former owner of the now defunct Sacramento Monarchs, and was minority owner of the Palms Casino Resort in Las Vegas with his brothers Joe Maloof, Gavin Maloof, Phil Maloof, and sister Adrienne Maloof. He is part of the Maloof family.

== Life and career ==
Maloof is of Lebanese and Irish descent. He was born and raised in Albuquerque, New Mexico, where his father, George Sr., operated a Coors beer distributorship. He attended the University of Nevada, Las Vegas where he studied casino management. He graduated Class of 1987 and was a member of the Kappa-Alpha chapter of Kappa Sigma fraternity. While at UNLV, Maloof played cornerback for the Runnin' Rebels football team. Death Row Records co-founder Suge Knight was his locker mate.

Maloof was the leading force behind the building and operation of the Palms Casino Resort just off Flamingo Road in Las Vegas, Nevada. He has overseen the operation of hotels throughout the Southwest and California, including the Fiesta hotel-casino in North Las Vegas, the Central Palace Casino in Central City, Colorado, and the Palms.

Maloof opened his first casino in Central City, Colorado, before returning to Las Vegas to open the Fiesta in 1994. He then built the 430-room Palms resort in 2001 with family money. The hotel, which accrues more than $50 million in annual profits, boasts stripper poles in private rooms, the Real World Suite (home to MTV's reality series) and an emphasis on hiring beautiful women. "If you have the girls, you are going to get the guys," Maloof once said. The Palms has hosted the MTV Video Music Awards, NBA All-Star weekend and the Ocean's 13 premiere.

The Maloof family helped finance the horror film Feast. The four brothers have also filmed a series of Carl's Jr. commercials, which began airing on October 16, 2006.

== Filmography ==
Year	Title	Role	Notes
2003	The E! True Hollywood Story	Himself	Episode "Real World"
2003	Project Greenlight 3	Himself	TV series (unknown episodes)
2003–2004	Las Vegas	Himself	2 episodes
2004	The Palms Girl Search	Himself	Also producer
2005	Feast	Executive producer	
2005	The Girls Next Door	Himself - owner/operator of The Palms	Episode "It's Vegas Baby!"
2007	Sunset Tan	Himself	Episode: "When the Cats Away"
2007	Reunited: Real World Las Vegas	Himself	Multiple episodes
2009	We Made You	Himself	Music video by Eminem
