= Yolanda Hadid =

Dutch-American model and TV personality (born 1964)

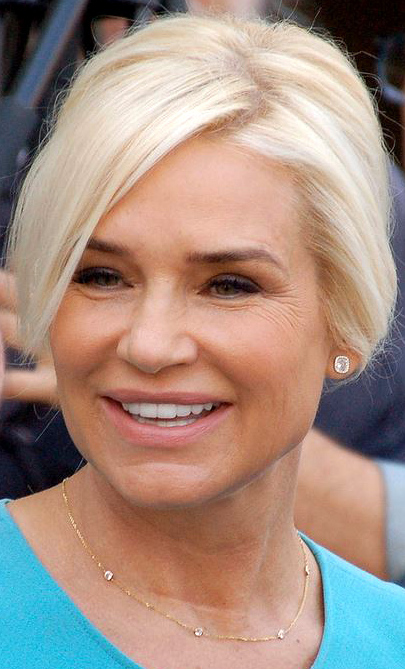
- Hadid in 2013
- Born: Yolanda van den Herik; January 11, 1964 (age 62); Papendrecht, Netherlands
- Other name: Yolanda Foster
- Citizenship: Netherlands; US (from 2013)
- Occupations: Model; TV personality
- Spouses: Mohamed Hadid (m. 1994; div. 2000) David Foster (m. 2011; div. 2017)
- Partner(s): Joseph Jingoli (2019–2025); Randy Kendrick (2025–present; engaged)
- Children: 3, including Gigi and Bella

Yolanda Hadid (/həˈdiːd/ hə-DEED; née van den Herik; formerly Foster; born January 11, 1964) is a Dutch and American television personality and former model. She is best known as a star of the American reality-television show The Real Housewives of Beverly Hills. She is the mother of IMG models Gigi and Bella Hadid.

== Early life ==
Yolanda van den Herik was born in Papendrecht, South Holland, into a family of Christian background. She has a brother named Leo. When she was seven years old, her father died in a car accident, leaving her mother, Ans van den Herik, to raise the two children.

== Career ==
Dutch designer Frans Molenaar asked van den Herik to replace one of his models at a show, where she was discovered by Eileen Ford and signed a contract with Ford Models. Afterward, van den Herik modeled in Paris, Milan, Sydney, Cape Town, Tokyo, New York, Los Angeles, and Hamburg. She modeled for 15 years before wanting to settle down and start a family. In 1994, van den Herik moved to Los Angeles to start her family after meeting and marrying Mohamed Hadid.

On January 11, 2018, her reality TV show competition Making a Model with Yolanda Hadid premiered on Lifetime, which had been developed under the working title Model Moms.

== Personal life ==
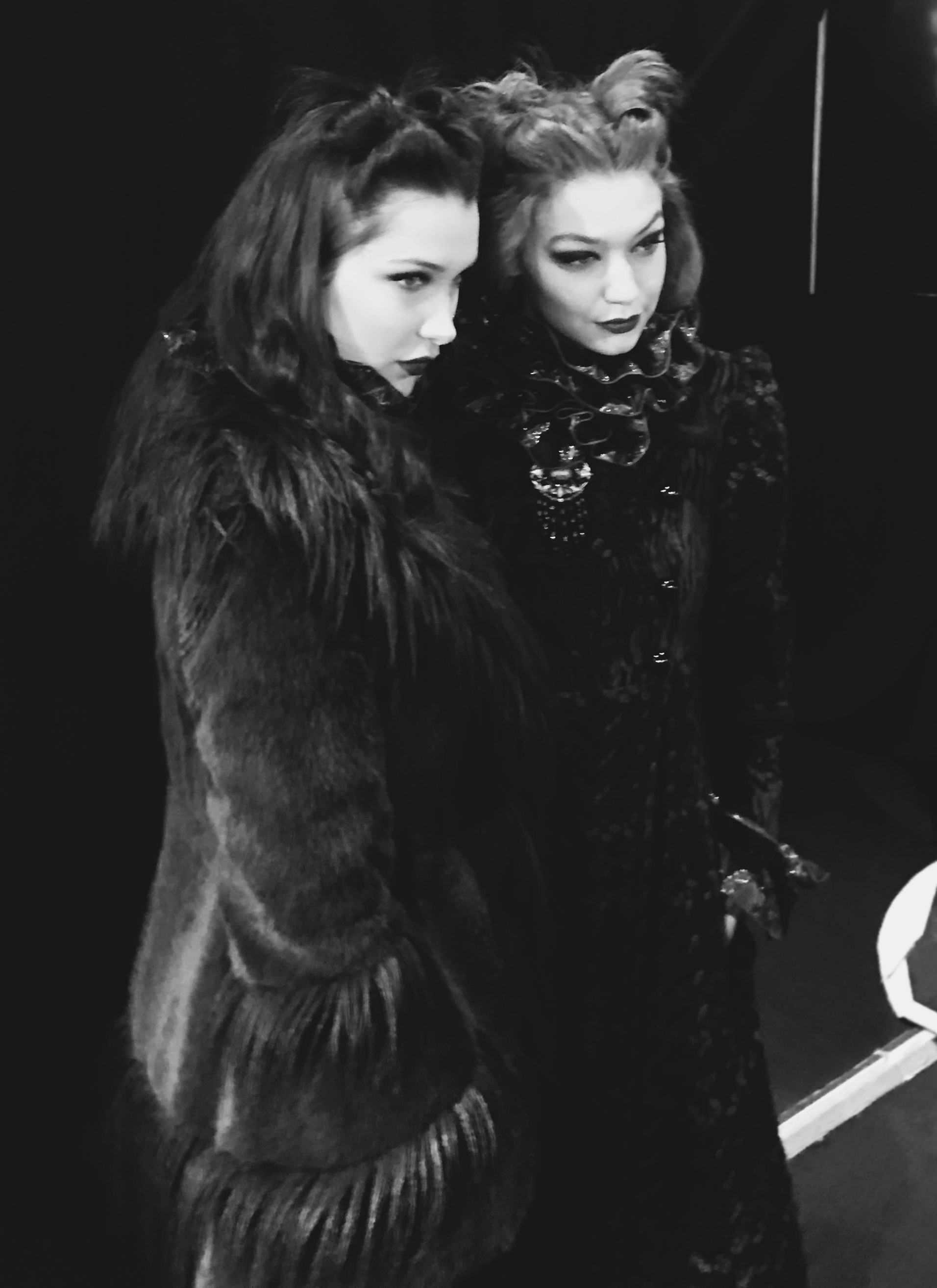
Van den Herik's daughters, models Bella and Gigi Hadid

She became a naturalized US citizen on May 23, 2013.

In October 2021, Hadid's daughter Gigi's partner Zayn Malik filed a no-contest plea to four charges of harassment by Hadid and was sentenced to 360 days of probation along with domestic violence and anger management programs.

Hadid's memoir Believe Me: My Battle with the Invisible Disability of Lyme Disease was published in 2017.

=== Health ===
Hadid has stated repeatedly on The Real Housewives of Beverly Hills and elsewhere that she has symptoms attributed to chronic Lyme disease, a discredited diagnosis that has no scientific backing.

In December 2012, Hadid reported that she was having a port implanted in her arm to help treat what she has stated is chronic Lyme. In April 2013, she had the port removed. In January 2015, she revealed that, as a consequence of the illness that Hadid believes she has, she had "lost the ability to read, write, or even watch TV". Hadid also claimed that two of her children also have chronic Lyme.

=== Relationship and children ===
Hadid's first marriage was to Mohamed Hadid, a real estate developer, from 1994 until 2000. The couple has three children together, Jelena "Gigi" (born April 23, 1995), Isabella "Bella" (born October 9, 1996), and Anwar (born June 22, 1999).

Hadid married musician, composer, and producer David Foster in Beverly Hills, California on November 11, 2011, after becoming engaged on Christmas Eve, 2010. On December 1, 2015, Hadid announced she and David Foster planned to divorce. The divorce was finalized on October 16, 2017.

In May 2020, Hadid announced she was in a relationship with the CEO of a construction and development company called Jingoli, Joseph "Joey" Jingoli. They announced their engagement in August 2024. On June 5, 2025, she ended her engagement. In June 2026, she got engaged to real estate developer Randy Kendrick.

== Filmography ==
Year	Title	Role	Notes
1991	1st & Ten	Betty Ann	"Flashbacks" (season 7, episode 15)
2011–2012	Nederlandse Hollywood Vrouwen	Herself	Series regular
2012–2016	The Real Housewives of Beverly Hills	Herself	Series regular (seasons 3–6)
2013	Vanderpump Rules	Herself	"Tooth or Consequences" (season 2, episode 1)
2014	The Real Housewives of New York City	Herself	"Unhappy Anniversary" (season 6, episode 6)
2017	Project Runway	Herself / Guest Judge	3 episodes
2018	Making a Model with Yolanda Hadid	Herself / Host	8 episodes
2022	Holland's Next Top Model	Judge	Season 13

=== Music videos ===
Year	Title	Artist	Role
2014	"G.U.Y."	Lady Gaga	The Real Housewives of Beverly Hills Band Member
