= Camille Meyer =

American television personality, dancer and actress

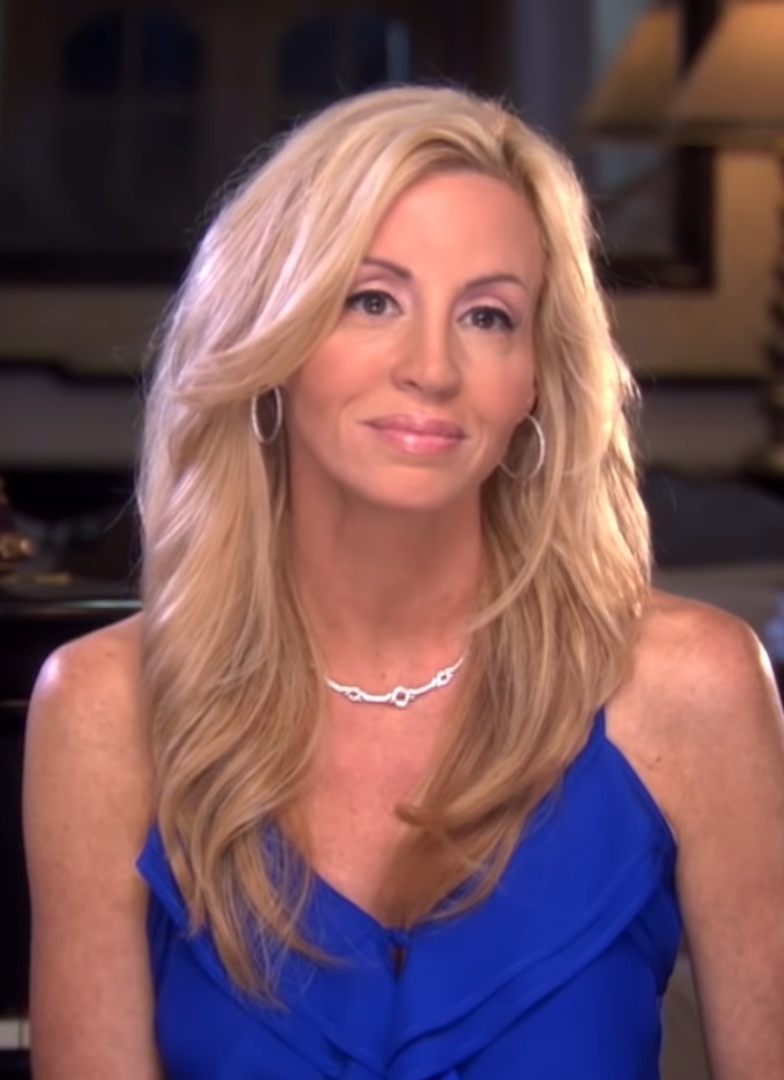
- Meyer in 2010
- Born: Camille Donatacci; September 2, 1968 (age 58); Newport Beach, California, U.S.
- Other name: Camille Grammer
- Education: Montclair State University (BA)
- Occupations: Actress, dancer, model, television personality
- Years active: 1984–present
- Spouses: Kelsey Grammer (m. 1997; div. 2011) David C. Meyer (m. 2018)
- Children: 2

Camille Meyer (née Donatacci, formerly Grammer; born September 2, 1968) is an American actress, dancer, model, and television personality. She is known for appearing on several seasons of the reality television show The Real Housewives of Beverly Hills.

Meyer started her career as a dancer, and worked as a producer and writer for Grammnet Productions. From 1997 to 2011, she was married to actor Kelsey Grammer.

== Early life ==
Camille Donatacci was born in Newport Beach, California and grew up in Cedar Grove, New Jersey. She studied English literature at Montclair State College in New Jersey, attended New York University and the UCLA School of Theater, Film and Television in Los Angeles.

== Career ==
Meyer started her career as a dancer in the 1980s, working on Club MTV and starring in a dance group performing at the Tavern on the Green in New York City. She appeared in several music videos, including "Give It All You Got" by Rights of The Accused, "The Party Starts Now!" by Manitoba's Wild Kingdom, and "Back to the Grill Again" by MC Serch.

In the 1990s, Meyer started working as a model and actress, modeling in Playboy publications like Playboy's Book of Lingerie, and appearing in R-rated erotic films such as Marilyn Chambers' Bedtime Stories, New York Nights, and The Naked Detective. She also had small roles in mainstream films Private Parts and Deconstructing Harry, and had a guest appearance in one episode of Frasier.

She owns half of Grammnet Productions, Kelsey Grammer's production company, which has produced a number of television shows from the late 1990s through 2010s, including Girlfriends, Medium, and The Game. Within the production company, Meyer worked as a creator, writer and executive producer.

Meyer became one of the original cast members of The Real Housewives of Beverly Hills in 2010. She was a main cast member for the first two seasons. In the season 1 episode "Turn, Turn, Turn", which aired January 13, 2011, Meyer revealed that her husband wanted to leave their marriage. The episode was the No. 1 telecast among adults 18–49 against all cable competition in its timeslot, as well as the highest-rated episode of the season among all viewers. In addition, the Watch What Happens Live! episode featuring Camille Donatacci Meyer as a guest right after the show, outperformed all late night cable talk shows that night.

In 2011, Meyer returned to acting, guest-starring on the season finale of the CBS sitcom $#*! My Dad Says, playing a recently divorced reality star named Camille. Describing her role, Meyer said: "My character Camille is basically a parody on myself, obviously, from Housewives of Beverly Hills. Just making fun of it, you know, making fun of all the quirky things I do and say." On whether she is pursuing a full-time acting career, Meyer said: "I studied acting years ago. It was kind of a dream I had years ago, but I gave that up when I got married and had children. I'm not pursuing this."

Meyer had other media appearances, such as co-hosting the Showbiz Tonight special on CNN live from the Academy Awards in Los Angeles and presenting at the 2011 NHL Awards in Las Vegas.

In March 2012, it was announced that Meyer would not return for the third season of The Real Housewives of Beverly Hills for personal reasons. She has since appeared as a part-time cast member and as a guest in several seasons.

Meyer filmed for the fifth season of The Real Housewives Ultimate Girls Trip, a spin-off featuring various women from The Real Housewives franchise, taking place in Marrakesh, Morocco, but the season was tabled.

== Personal life ==
Camille met actor Kelsey Grammer in 1996, and they married in Malibu, California, in 1997. They have two children, both born via a surrogate mother. In July 2010, she filed for divorce, seeking primary physical custody of the couple's children, in addition to child support and alimony. The divorce was finalized on February 10, 2011.

After her divorce, she began dating fitness trainer and lawyer Dimitri Charalambopoulos. On October 29, 2013, she filed a domestic violence protective order against Charalambopoulos, saying that he assaulted her two days after her radical hysterectomy for endometrial cancer, when she was staying at Hotel Zaza in Houston, Texas, recovering. The Houston Police Department said that she and Charalambopoulos "broke each other's cell phones" and that her injuries were minor, so no charges were filed against Charalambopoulos.

In October 2017, she became engaged to attorney David C. Meyer. They were married on October 20, 2018, in Hawaii.

Her Malibu home was destroyed in the deadly 2018 Woolsey Fire.

== Filmography ==
| Year | Show | Role | Notes |
|---|---|---|---|
| 1984 | New York Nights | Herself | |
| 1985–1992 | Club MTV | Dancer | |
| 1993 | Marilyn Chambers' Bedtime Stories | Angelique | |
| 1996 | The Naked Detective | Annie O'Shea | |
| 1997 | Private Parts | Bikini Girl | |
| 1997 | Frasier | Miss Candy Cane Eve | Episode: "Frasier Grinch" Episode: "Halloween" |
| 1997 | Deconstructing Harry | Honorary Ceremony Guest | |
| 2001 | Neurotic Tendencies | Executive producer | TV movie |
| 2002 | Mr. St. Nick | Head producer | TV movie |
| 2003 | Gary the Rat | Secretary | 3 episodes |
| 2004 | A Christmas Carol: The Musical | Producer | TV movie |
| 2008 | An American Carol | I Gave Up An Ass Lift For This? | |
| 2010–2020, 2023–24 | The Real Housewives of Beverly Hills | Herself | Seasons 1–2 (main) Seasons 3, 8—9 (recurring) Seasons 5–7, 10, 13–14 (guest) |
| 2011 | $#*! My Dad Says | Camille | Episode: "Who's Your Daddy" |
| 2013 | RuPaul's Drag Race | Guest Judge | 2 episodes ("RuPaullywood or Bust") |
| 2013 | Betty White's Off Their Rockers | Herself | 1 episode |
| 2013 | 90210 | Herself | Episode: "Dude, Where's My Husband?" |
| 2014 | The Hungover Games | Tanya | |
| 2024 | The Real Housewives Ultimate Girls Trip | Herself | Season 5 |
| 2025 | Denise Richards & Her Wild Things | Herself | 2 episodes |
