= Edelson =

American law firm known for class action lawsuits

Edelson PC
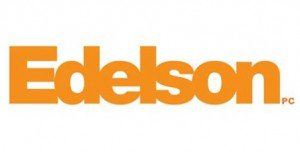
- Headquarters: 350 North LaSalle, Chicago, Illinois, U.S.
- No. of offices: 3
- No. of attorneys: 27 attorneys
- Major practice areas: Class Action; Mass Tort; Consumer Protection
- Date founded: 2007; 19 years ago
- Company type: Professional Corporation
- Website: www.edelson.com

Edelson PC is an American plaintiffs' law firm that focuses on public client investigations, class actions, mass tort, and consumer protection laws. Edelson’s cases include class action settlements against Facebook for $650 million (2021), social casino apps for nearly $200 million (2021), and a $925 million verdict against ViSalus (2020.)

== Firm history ==
Edelson PC was founded in 2007 in Chicago, Illinois and opened an office in San Francisco, California in 2015.

== Ligitation ==
Edelson has litigated against Facebook, Amazon, Apple, Google for violating consumer privacy laws by improperly storing users' search, contact, and biometric data.

Edelson PC is co-lead counsel in the NCAA personal injury concussion litigation brought against the NCAA, its member institutions, and its conferences on behalf of college football players who allege the NCAA failed to protect them from concussions and brain damage, including CTE. There are more than 369 total lawsuits filed. Edelson PC leads a number of actions on behalf of governmental entities and labor unions in lawsuits against drug manufacturers and distributors over the opioid epidemic.

Edelson PC filed numerous class actions arising in the aftermath of the federal bailouts of US banks (e.g., Citibank, Chase, and Wells Fargo). The lawsuits alleged the banks unlawfully suspended home credit lines based on pre-textual reasons, and that certain banks failed to honor loan modification programs. Edelson PC achieved the first federal appellate decision in the country recognizing the right of Wells Fargo borrowers to enforce HAMP trial plans under state law. The eventual settlements exceeded $3 billion in home equity lines of credit.

Edelson PC prosecuted more than 100 cases on behalf of consumers who allegedly received unauthorized charges on their mobile phone bills, settling numerous nationwide class actions, including against industry leader AT&T Mobility, collectively worth more than $100 million.

=== Class action settlements ===
Edelson PC has regularly raised concern regarding the conduct of plaintiffs’ attorneys and objected to a number of settlements. Edelson has objected to or intervened in settlements with TikTok, the NCAA, Neiman Marcus, and Equifax.

The firm also brought a RICO lawsuit against a “professional class-action objector” raising allegations of extortion, which resulted in a judgment entered against attorney Christopher Bandas, prohibiting him from practicing law in the state of Illinois and limiting his ability to object to class action settlements in federal or state court.

In December 2020, the firm filed a lawsuit against Tom Girardi, the law firm of Girardi & Keese, and Erika Girardi, among others, alleging that Girardi had misappropriated client funds. Following the filing of that lawsuit, numerous other allegations against Tom Girardi came to light, and he and his law firm thereafter filed for bankruptcy.

=== Cases ===
Spokeo v. Robins: Edelson PC successfully argued to the United States Supreme Court that a plaintiff can have standing under Article III of the U.S. Constitution by alleging that a website published inaccurate information about him, in violation of the Fair Credit Reporting Act.

Mullen v. GLV, Inc., et al.: Edelson PC brought a class action on behalf of several parents for failure to disclose sexual abuse occurring within Sports Performance Volleyball Club. Its owners, Rick and Cheryl Butler, are charged with withholding and misrepresented information about the sexual abuse allegations against Rick Butler. Edelson PC represented that it would donate any attorney's fees received in the case to charity. The case is one of the first sexual abuse cases to be granted class actions status.

Harris, et al. v. comScore, Inc.: Edelson PC was appointed class counsel in a suit alleging improper data collecting practices by one of the world's largest internet analytics companies and successfully certified a class estimated by several sources to be the largest privacy case ever certified on an adversarial basis.

In re Facebook Privacy Litigation: Edelson PC filed the first of its kind class action against Facebook under the Illinois Biometric Information Privacy Act. The lawsuit alleges that Facebook collected facial recognition data from its users without authorization.

== Firm culture ==
Edelson PC has drawn attention in the legal community by cultivating the feel of a startup. The dress code is casual and the Chicago offices have an indoor volleyball court, golf simulator, a ping pong table, and a pool table. Edelson's prank culture has featured elaborate jokes such as hiring an actor to play an unruly law student employing a polar bear as an attorney, and commissioning a musical parody of Hamilton written by Edelson PC lawyers.
