= Pretty Mess =

Pretty Mess may refer to:

- "Pretty Mess" (Vanity song), a 1984 song by Vanity
- Pretty Mess, a 2004 album by Bella
- Pretty Mess (album), a 2009 album by Erika Jayne
  - "Pretty Mess" (Erika Jayne song), a 2010 single by Erika Jayne, title track of the album
- Pretty Mess (book), a 2018 book by Erika Jayne

== See also ==
- A Pretty Mess by This One Band, a 1996 extended play by Grandaddy
- Erika Jayne Presents: The Pretty Mess Tour, a 2018 tour by Erika Jayne
