= The Real Housewives of Beverly Hills season 8 =

The Real Housewives of Beverly Hills
- Season 8
- Cover used by the iTunes Store; Left to right: Richards, Mellencamp, Vanderpump, Girardi, Kemsley and Rinna
- Starring: Kyle Richards; Lisa Vanderpump; Lisa Rinna; Erika Girardi; Dorit Kemsley; Teddi Mellencamp
- No. of episodes: 22

Release
- Original network: Bravo
- Original release: December 19, 2017 – May 15, 2018

Season chronology
- ← Previous; Season 7 Next → Season 9

The eighth season of The Real Housewives of Beverly Hills, an American reality television show, aired on Bravo from December 19, 2017, to May 15, 2018, and is primarily filmed in Beverly Hills, California.

The season focuses on the personal and professional lives of Kyle Richards, Lisa Vanderpump, Lisa Rinna, Erika Girardi, Dorit Kemsley and Teddi Mellencamp.

The season's executive producers are Andrew Hoegl, Barrie Bernstein, Lisa Shannon, Pam Healy and Andy Cohen.

== Production and crew ==
Alex Baskin, Chris Cullen, Douglas Ross, Greg Stewart, Toni Gallagher, Dave Rupel and Andy Cohen are recognized as the series' executive producers; it is produced and distributed by Evolution Media.

== Cast and synopsis ==
=== Cast ===
The eighth season came with the addition of Teddi Mellencamp Arroyave. Grammer returned in a friend of capacity, while Davidson, Resnick and Maloof appeared as guests.

=== Synopsis ===
Teddi Mellencamp, daughter of John Mellencamp, joins as a new full-time cast member, while Camille Grammer returns in a recurring capacity.

One of the season's main conflicts is between Mellencamp and Dorit Kemsley. It starts when Kemsley shows up late to a dinner with Mellencamp, and when Mellencamp brings it up to Kyle Richards, Kemsley fires back by criticizing Mellencamp's hospitality. The conflict between them runs through most of the season.

Erika Girardi works on her memoir, Pretty Mess, revisiting her upbringing and early career. Lisa Vanderpump and husband Ken Todd deal with legal trouble involving their rescue organization, Vanderpump Dogs.

The cast travels to Berlin for a group trip. Kemsley falls ill during the trip, and at a dinner there, Grammer clashes with several of the women.

== Episodes ==
The Real Housewives of Beverly Hills season 8 episodes
No. overall	No. in season	Title	Original release date	U.S. viewers (millions)
155	1	"Don't Cry Over Spilled Wine"	December 19, 2017	1.65
156	2	"Diva Las Vegas"	December 26, 2017	1.64
157	3	"Bad Guys"	January 2, 2018	1.68
158	4	"Lights Out!"	January 9, 2018	1.62
159	5	"Unfashionably Late"	January 16, 2018	1.80
160	6	"Wham, Glam, Thank You Ma'am"	January 23, 2018	1.56
161	7	"Birthday Fever"	January 30, 2018	1.60
162	8	"Petty Mess"	February 6, 2018	1.58
163	9	"That Was Weird"	February 13, 2018	1.49
164	10	"The Big Apple Bites"	February 20, 2018	1.55
165	11	"Thank You, Thuck You"	February 27, 2018	1.74
166	12	"Gag Gift"	March 6, 2018	1.47
167	13	"Crying Shame"	March 13, 2018	1.61
168	14	"Heaven Knows"	March 20, 2018	1.78
169	15	"Dames, Dogs and Danke"	March 27, 2018	1.61
170	16	"Holy Schnitzel"	April 3, 2018	1.76
171	17	"Better Latex Than Never"	April 10, 2018	1.58
172	18	"The Runaway Runway"	April 17, 2018	1.80
173	19	"Reunion Part 1"	April 24, 2018	1.85
174	20	"Reunion Part 2"	May 1, 2018	1.61
175	21	"Reunion Part 3"	May 8, 2018	1.64
176	22	"Secrets Revealed"	May 15, 2018	1.16
