= Puppygate =

Puppygate may refer to:

- Lucy Lucy Apple Juice story arc in The Real Housewives of Beverly Hills season 9
- 2015 Hugo Awards controversy
