= The Real Housewives of Beverly Hills season 9 =

The Real Housewives of Beverly Hills
- Season 9
- Cover used by the iTunes Store; Left to right: Denise Richards, Girardi, Kemsley, Kyle Richards, Rinna, Mellencamp and Vanderpump
- Starring: Kyle Richards; Lisa Vanderpump; Lisa Rinna; Erika Girardi; Dorit Kemsley; Teddi Mellencamp; Denise Richards
- No. of episodes: 24

Release
- Original network: Bravo
- Original release: February 12 – July 30, 2019

Season chronology
- ← Previous; Season 8 Next → Season 10

The ninth season of The Real Housewives of Beverly Hills, an American reality television series, aired on Bravo from February 12, 2019 to July 30, 2019, and is primarily filmed in Beverly Hills, California.

The season focuses on the personal and professional lives of Kyle Richards, Lisa Vanderpump, Lisa Rinna, Erika Girardi, Dorit Kemsley, Teddi Mellencamp and Denise Richards. The season consisted of 24 episodes.

This season marked the final appearance of original housewife Lisa Vanderpump.

The season's executive producers are Andrew Hoegl, Barrie Bernstein, Lisa Shannon, Pam Healy and Andy Cohen.

== Production and crew ==
The Real Housewives of Beverly Hills was renewed for a ninth season in April 2018. The season premiered on February 12, 2019. Alex Baskin, Chris Cullen, Douglas Ross, Greg Stewart, Toni Gallagher, Dave Rupel and Andy Cohen are recognized as the series' executive producers. The season was produced and distributed by Evolution Media.

== Cast and synopsis ==
=== Cast ===
All six cast members from the previous season returned, along with Denise Richards joining the cast in a regular capacity. Grammer returned once again as a friend of the housewives. Vanderpump last appeared in the final episode of the season. On June 4, 2019, Vanderpump announced that she would not attend the ninth season reunion, stating: "The objective of the reunion is to reunite, right? And I have no inclination to reunite with the women who've been harassing me for 10 months now." Following this, Variety announced that she would not return to the series.

=== Synopsis ===
The major conflict of the season revolves around the women turning on Lisa Vanderpump. It begins when Dorit Kemsley adopts a dog from Vanderpump's animal rescue shelter, which she names "Lucy Lucy Apple Juice." When Lucy exhibits behavioral problems and bites members of Kemsley's family, she rehomes the dog to someone else. The new owner subsequently surrenders Lucy to a different shelter, one that euthanizes unwanted animals, after allegedly encountering the same issues Kemsley had.

The adoption dispute escalates when two Vanderpump Dogs employees raise the matter with Kyle Richards and Teddi Mellencamp during a visit to the rescue foundation. Vanderpump attempts to shut down the conversation on camera, but the employees press the issue, expressing frustration that Kemsley knew rehoming was a contract violation and that Lucy was not the first dog she had failed to properly care for. The situation deepens during a group vacation to the Bahamas, where the topic of Lucy resurfaces at dinner. Lisa Rinna immediately accuses Vanderpump of orchestrating the employees' remarks as a deliberate setup. Mellencamp then confesses that she had prior knowledge of the Lucy situation before her visit to the foundation and had coordinated with the employees to create a scene for the cameras to embarrass Kemsley. However, Mellencamp insists she was acting as an intermediary on Vanderpump's behalf, a claim Vanderpump emphatically denies.

When the story is leaked to tabloid outlet Radar Online, the rest of the cast unanimously suspects Vanderpump of being the source. The accusation leads to a direct confrontation between Richards and Vanderpump at Vanderpump's home, Villa Rosa. Richards tells Vanderpump that the entire group, including herself, believes Vanderpump orchestrated both the leak and the foundation encounter to punish the Kemsleys without directly jeopardizing her own friendship with them. Vanderpump, incensed at being called a liar, throws Richards out of the house and ends their friendship. Vanderpump subsequently takes a polygraph test on camera in an effort to prove she did not leak the story, with the examiner concluding she is telling the truth.

Compounding the interpersonal strain, Vanderpump is privately coping with the death of her brother Mark, who died by suicide during the period of filming. Increasingly isolated from the group, Vanderpump stops filming with the other cast members for the remainder of the season. She declines to attend the season reunion, stating she has "no inclination to reunite with the women who've been harassing me for 10 months." Shortly after, Variety reports that Vanderpump will not return for the tenth season, marking the end of her nine-season run as an original cast member.

Away from the "Puppygate" saga, Richards marries her fiance Aaron Phypers in a ceremony planned in under a week, with only Grammer in attendance from the cast. Grammer herself marries attorney David C. Meyer in a wedding that serves as the season's penultimate event, though the celebration is marred by a confrontation between Grammer and the other women over her behavior throughout the season. Kyle Richards grapples with sending her daughter Sophia to college in Washington, D.C., as she comes to terms with her children leaving home. Rinna hosts a dinner honoring her mother Lois that takes a contentious turn when Grammer voices her support for Brett Kavanaugh during his Supreme Court confirmation hearings, sparking a heated political debate among the group. The group also travels to Provence without Vanderpump, where tensions among the remaining women continue to simmer.

== Episodes ==
The Real Housewives of Beverly Hills season 9 episodes
No. overall	No. in season	Title	Original release date	U.S. viewers (millions)
177	1	"Lucy Lucy Apple Juicy"	February 12, 2019	1.63
178	2	"Eat Your Heart Out"	February 19, 2019	1.57
Kyle Richards and Lisa Vanderpump go to visit the surgeon Simon Ourian.
179	3	"Sun and Shade in the Bahamas"	February 26, 2019	1.69
The cast members arrive at New Providence on a private jet. They go to Baha Mar. Erika Jayne goes swimming with a 70-inch ponytail.
180	4	"Bahama Drama"	March 5, 2019	1.55
181	5	"The Proof Hurts"	March 12, 2019	1.55
182	6	"Fifty Shades of Shade"	March 19, 2019	1.61
Camille Grammer is planning her 50th birthday bash.
183	7	"Eat Drink and Be Married"	March 26, 2019	1.65
184	8	"Showdown at Villa Rosa"	April 2, 2019	1.61
The episode ends in Lisa Vanderpump throwing Kyle Richards out of her Villa Rosa house.
185	9	"A Wolf in Camille's Clothing"	April 9, 2019	1.81
186	10	"A Supreme Snub"	April 16, 2019	1.72
187	11	"Do You Really Want to Hurt Me?"	April 23, 2019	1.69
188	12	"The Ultimate Ultimatum"	April 30, 2019	1.70
189	13	"Grilling Me Softly"	May 7, 2019	1.73
190	14	"The Show Must Go On"	May 14, 2019	1.76
191	15	"One Wedding and a Polygraph"	May 21, 2019	1.66
192	16	"Meet Rinna Jayne"	May 28, 2019	1.71
The housewives and their husbands attend a Halloween party.
193	17	"A Double Shot of Brandi"	June 4, 2019	1.60
Brandi Glanville appears in this episode.
194	18	"Pardon Our French"	June 11, 2019	1.54
Five housewives travel to Provence without Lisa Vanderpump.
195	19	"Thirst Impressions"	June 18, 2019	1.67
196	20	"Un Petit Hangover"	June 25, 2019	1.63
197	21	"Hurricane Camille"	July 9, 2019	1.82
198	22	"Reunion Part 1"	July 16, 2019	1.75
199	23	"Reunion Part 2"	July 23, 2019	1.81
200	24	"Reunion Part 3"	July 30, 2019	1.45
