= Get It Tonight =

Single by Erika Jayne
- Released: May 7, 2013
- Genre: Pop; House; EDM
- Length: 3:39
- Label: Pretty Mess Records; New Nation
- Producer(s): Vassal Benford

Erika Jayne singles chronology
"Party People (Ignite the World)" (2011)	"Get It Tonight" (2013)	"Painkillr" (2014)

"Get It Tonight" is a song recorded by American singer and songwriter Erika Jayne featuring rapper Flo Rida. The single was released through a joint venture with Pretty Mess Records and New Nation Live label, distributed by Universal Music Group. The song was produced by Vassal Benford, whose credits include The Jets, Diplo, Toni Braxton and Jonas Blue.

"Get It Tonight" received generally favorable reviews from contemporary music critics, most of whom praised the song's lyrics and Erika Jayne's vocals on the track. "Get It Tonight" reached number 13 on the Dance/Electronic Streaming Songs chart. Marenah Dobin of Bustle called "Get It Tonight" the "perfect party song."

== Background ==
"Flo Rida is great. He’s a great performer and a really nice guy. We had a lot of fun on the video set. He’s one cool dude. I’ve never had a feature before and it was really great that we got to have him on the record. It really helped bring awareness to me, my brand, and to my stuff. I’m really thankful for that. The song is cute. It’s about gettin’ it tonight. And I think everybody should get it tonight," Jayne told 303 magazine in 2013.

== Music video ==
Erika Jayne released the lyric video for the song on February 14, 2013. A music video for "Get It Tonight" was released on May 7, 2013 and directed by Mikey Minden and Ray Kay. The video begins with Flo Rida performing his rap while Jayne dances around him seductively. Other scenes include Jayne by herself singing the verses.

== Track listing ==
CD single and digital download
No.	Title	Length
1.	"Get It Tonight (feat. Flo Rida)"	3:39
2.	"Get It Tonight (feat. Flo Rida) [Old Man Mix]"	5:20
3.	"Get It Tonight (feat. Flo Rida) [Vino Mix]"	4:49
4.	"Get It Tonight (feat. Flo Rida) [Dub Mix]"	3:41
5.	"Get It Tonight (feat. Flo Rida) [Glitz Mix]"	3:13

== Charts ==
Charts (2013)	Peak position
US Hot Dance/Electronic Songs (Billboard)	13

== Release history ==
Country	Date	Format	Label	Ref.
Worldwide	May 7, 2013	Digital download	New Nation Live / Pretty Mess Records	
