= The Real Housewives of Beverly Hills season 7 =

The Real Housewives of Beverly Hills
- Season 7
- Cover used by the iTunes Store; Left to right: Rinna, Davidson, Richards, Girardi, Vanderpump and Kemsley
- Starring: Kyle Richards; Lisa Vanderpump; Eileen Davidson; Lisa Rinna; Erika Girardi; Dorit Kemsley
- No. of episodes: 21

Release
- Original network: Bravo
- Original release: December 6, 2016 – April 25, 2017

Season chronology
- ← Previous; Season 6 Next → Season 8

The seventh season of The Real Housewives of Beverly Hills, an American reality television series, aired on Bravo from December 6, 2016 to April 25, 2017, and is primarily filmed in Beverly Hills, California.

The season focuses on the personal and professional lives of Kyle Richards, Lisa Vanderpump, Eileen Davidson, Lisa Rinna, Erika Girardi and Dorit Kemsley. The season consists of 21 episodes.

This season marked the final regular appearance of Eileen Davidson.

The season's executive producers are Andrew Hoegl, Barrie Bernstein, Lisa Shannon, Pam Healy and Andy Cohen.

== Production and crew ==
The Real Housewives of Beverly Hills was renewed for a seventh season in April 2016. In August 2016, it was revealed that filming for the seventh season had begun with the announcement of a returning housewife. On November 1, 2016, the trailer, premiere date and full cast were officially revealed. The season will premiere on December 6, 2016.

Alex Baskin, Chris Cullen, Douglas Ross, Greg Stewart, Toni Gallagher, Dave Rupel and Andy Cohen are recognized as the series' executive producers; it is produced and distributed by Evolution Media.

== Cast and synopsis ==
=== Cast ===
In June 2016, Yolanda Hadid announced that she had decided to leave the series after season six. Hadid revealed that she wished could depart the series on higher note, alluding to last years storyline revolving around her health. Shortly after Hadid's departure, the network released a statement wishing her well and leaving the door open for her saying, "We wish her a full recovery and hope to see her again sometime on the show."

On July 7, 2016, Lisa Vanderpump announced that she had considered departing the series but went on to announce her return for season seven. On the same day as Vanderpump's announcement of her return, Kathryn Edwards announced her departure. Edwards said the reason for her departure was due to prioritizing what she values most and she values time with her husband. She went on to say that she is very private and she valued her time on the series. Edwards also looks forward to watching season seven saying, "I'm dying to see what's going to happen with Vanderpump and the crew next season!"

In August 2016, Eileen Davidson announced she would return for her third consecutive season. That same month, Kyle Richards was also returning to season seven, due to Bravo sharing a photo of the camera crew in her kitchen. Kyle also went on to tease the new dynamic and shift in the series due to a new cast member, and expressed that she would like her sister and former castmate, Kim Richards, to return to the series.

In addition to the three returning housewives, it had been revealed that Eden Sassoon, daughter of hairstylist Vidal Sassoon, was filming for the upcoming season, as well as former cast member Camille Grammer. Grammer went on to describe a party that had been filmed and in attendance was returning wives Kyle and Davidson as well as season six's Erika Girardi. Later in September, Vanderpump confirmed her close friend, Dorit Kemsley, had been filming for the seventh season, and that Glanville would not be making any appearances in the season. On September 19, 2016, during an interview with Access Hollywood, Kyle Richards confirmed that Sassoon would appear in a recurring capacity. In the same interview, Rinna also confirmed Sassoon's arrival to the series as well as confirming her own return. On October 27, 2016, Bravo confirmed that the seventh season would feature six housewives; this included the previously confirmed Vanderpump, Kyle Richards and Rinna. In the following days, Bravo official confirmed Davidson and Girardi's return. On November 1, 2016, Bravo announced the six wives to be featured in the seventh season would be Vanderpump, Kyle Richards, Rinna, Davidson, Girardi and newcomer Dorit Kemsley. In the official trailer for the season, it was revealed that former housewives Camille Grammer and Kim Richards would make guest appearances.

Dorit, who joins the series as a close friend of Vanderpump, grew up in Woodbridge, Connecticut. Soon after leaving her hometown at 19-years-old, she arrived in Italy, where she used her bachelor's degree in marketing, design and communication at a global swimwear company. After working for the company for a decade, Dorit moved to New York and began designing her own clothes for her company, Dorit, that specializes in Italian resort and swimwear. In New York, she met English businessman, Paul Kemsley. The pair married on March 7, 2015, which was documented by Wedding Style magazine, and since the pair have had two children together: a two-year-old son, Jagger, and a daughter, Phoenix. When the couple isn't raising their kids they run their management company, Nixxi Entertainment, with clients such as Boy George and Pelé. Although Dorit juggles hosting events for the management company, raising a family and designing clothes, she still maintains time for organizations such as Safe Kids.

Also joining the seventh season, in a recurring capacity, is Eden Sassoon. Eden has gone on to extend the legacy with owning two salons, EDEN by Eden Sassoon, and two Pilates studios. Not only does Sassoon own four businesses, but she has also built a nonprofit organization, Beauty Gives Back. Sassoon's organization helps fight the global water crisis by uniting the hair industry. Sassoon is the mother of two, Olivia and Tyler, in which she shares custody with her ex-husband. She struggles with the challenge of being a single mother as well as finding the time to run her multiple businesses. With being sober for four-years, Sassoon lives in a constant cleanse and is described to be a person who is "outspoken" and has a "flirtatious lifestyle."

=== Synopsis ===
Dorit Kemsley, a fashion designer married to English property developer Paul "PK" Kemsley, joins the cast as a new housewife. Eden Sassoon, daughter of Vidal Sassoon, also appears in a recurring role. A lot of the season revolves around an incident the cast refers to as "pantygate." During a dinner, Girardi reveals she is not wearing underwear, and PK Kemsley's reaction sets off a feud between Dorit and Girardi. The dispute carries over to a cast trip to Hong Kong, where Girardi confronts the Kemsleys for still talking about it publicly.

Separately, Rinna gets drawn into questions about Kim Richards' sobriety after Eden, who is also in recovery, raises concerns about Kim. The Kemsley's also drew criticism after questioning Rinna and Davidson's expressions of grief at a dinner, which the latter took offense to after the death of her mother. The season marks Davidson's exit as a series regular. Grammer and Kim both make guest appearances throughout the season.

== Episodes ==
The Real Housewives of Beverly Hills season 7 episodes
No. overall	No. in season	Title	Original release date	U.S. viewers (millions)
134	1	"Stronger Than Ever"	December 6, 2016	1.63
Lisa Vanderpump introduces the group to her friend, Dorit, whose houseguest is Boy George; Erika celebrates her birthday with a Studio 54-inspired party; Lisa Rinna and Eileen come face to face with Lisa Vanderpump for the first time in months.
135	2	"The Buddha Bentley Birthday"	December 13, 2016	1.60
Erika auditions dancers for her new music video; Dorit's birthday party provides a few surprises; Lisa Vanderpump shows Lisa Rinna and Eileen exactly where they stand.
136	3	"Going Commando"	December 20, 2016	1.84
137	4	"Pantygate"	December 27, 2016	2.01
Dorit wonders if Erika's wardrobe malfunction was intentional, and Lisa Rinna embarks upon a 24-hour garment-selling marathon. Erika explores a future in acting with Eileen, and Dorit uses a risky manoeuvre to confront Erika.
138	5	"Amnesia Appetizers"	January 3, 2017	1.89
139	6	"Compromising Positions"	January 10, 2017	1.61
140	7	"It's Expensive to Be Me"	January 17, 2017	1.76
141	8	"Boys, Blades and Bag of Pills"	January 24, 2017	1.73
142	9	"Harry's Meat and Gatsby's Fete"	January 31, 2017	1.67
143	10	"Hostile Hacienda"	February 7, 2017	1.40
144	11	"Backed Into a Corner"	February 14, 2017	1.55
145	12	"Feeding a Need"	February 21, 2017	1.66
146	13	"Cake Therapy"	February 28, 2017	1.48
147	14	"Sweet Georgia Jayne"	March 7, 2017	1.63
148	15	"Hong Kong Fireworks"	March 14, 2017	1.65
149	16	"Big Buddha Brawl"	March 21, 2017	1.92
150	17	"From Dogs to Diamonds"	March 28, 2017	1.90
151	18	"Diamonds Under Pressure"	April 4, 2017	1.99
152	19	"Reunion, Part 1"	April 11, 2017	2.03
153	20	"Reunion, Part 2"	April 18, 2017	1.93
154	21	"Reunion, Part 3"	April 25, 2017	1.97
