= Party People (Ignite the World) =

Single by Erika Jayne
- Released: November 15, 2011
- Recorded: 2010
- Length: 3:31
- Label: Pretty Mess Records
- Songwriter(s): Andreas Carlsson; Niclas Kings; Kalle Engstrom
- Producer(s): Andreas Carlsson; Niclas Kings

Erika Jayne singles chronology
"One Hot Pleasure" (2010)	"Party People (Ignite the World)" (2011)	"Get It Tonight" (2013)

"Party People (Ignite the World)" is a song recorded by American singer and songwriter Erika Jayne. It reached number one on Billboard's Hot Dance Club Play chart in 2011. "One Hot Pleasure" became Jayne's sixth number one single on the Hot Dance Club Play chart. The single's remixes were created by Jody den Broeder, Bimbo Jones, Hector Fonseca, Whiiite and Cory Enemy.

== Critical reception ==
Bradley Stern of Muumuse called Erika Jayne one of the newest "Kweens of the Dance Floor" and picked "Party People (Ignite the World)" as the hot club track of the week in December 2011. Stern praised the music video's "abundant hair flips and glittery Louboutins". Jamie Sward of Music Is My King Size Bed compared the sound of "Party People (Ignite the World)" to Cascada's "Evacuate the Dancefloor". Sward noted that "as soon as the single hit iTunes, it was destined to ignite the charts". Sward complimented Jayne's ability to carry the song with a combination of "sexuality, powerhouse club diva vocals, and sexy, fierce ferocity."

== Background and composition ==
The song was written and produced by Swedish producers and songwriters Andreas Carlsson and Niclas Kings. Carlsson's previous credits include Britney Spears, Celine Dion, Westlife, Bon Jovi, LeAnn Rimes, Lindsay Lohan and Carrie Underwood.

== Music video ==
The official music video for "Party People (Ignite the World)" was directed by Jayne's longtime collaborator and choreographer Mikey Minden.

== Track listings and formats ==
- CD single
1. "Party People (Ignite the World)" (Original Radio Edit) – 3:31
2. "Party People (Ignite the World)" (Original Extended) – 5:34
- CD single "The Remixes, Pt. 1 - EP"
1. "Party People (Ignite the World)" (Bimbo Jones Remix) – 8:17
2. "Party People (Ignite the World)" (Bimbo Jones Dub) – 8:21
3. "Party People (Ignite the World)" (Jody den Broeder Club Remix) – 6:56
4. "Party People (Ignite the World)" (Jody den Broeder Dub) – 6:56
5. "Party People (Ignite the World)" (Hector Fonseca Remix) – 7:41
6. "Party People (Ignite the World)" (Hector Fonseca Dub) – 7:52
7. "Party People (Ignite the World)" (Cory Enemy Remix) – 5:26
8. "Party People (Ignite the World)" (Whiiite Remix) – 5:53
9. "Party People (Ignite the World)" (Whiiite Dub) – 5:52
- CD single "The Remixes, Pt. 2 - EP"
1. "Party People (Ignite the World)" (Bimbo Jones Radio Edit) – 3:21
2. "Party People (Ignite the World)" (Jody den Broeder Radio Edit) – 4:11
3. "Party People (Ignite the World)" (Hector Fonseca Edit) – 4:02
4. "Party People (Ignite the World)" (Whiiite Radio Edit) – 4:53
5. "Party People (Ignite the World)" (Cory Enemy Radio Edit) – 3:37

== Charts ==
Chart (2011)	Peak position
Global Dance Songs (Billboard)	25
US Dance Club Songs (Billboard)	1

== Release history ==
Country	Date	Format	Label	Ref.
Worldwide	November 16, 2010	Digital download	Pretty Mess Records	

== See also ==
- List of number-one dance singles of 2011 (US)
