= Erika Jayne: Bet It All on Blonde =

American reality documentary series

- Genre: Reality television
- Starring: Erika Jayne; Mikey Minden; Kevin Teasley
- Country of origin: United States
- Original language: English
- No. of episodes: 2

Production
- Executive producers: Erika Jayne; Alex Baskin; Rich Bye; Jeff Festa; Cameron Freeman; Mark Ritchie; Billy Taylor
- Producers: Mikey Minden; Earl Narajos
- Camera setup: Multiple
- Running time: 40 minutes
- Production companies: 32 Flavors Entertainment; Goodbye Pictures

Original release
- Network: Bravo
- Release: March 6, 2024

Related
- The Real Housewives of Beverly Hills

Erika Jayne: Bet It All on Blonde is an American two-part documentary series produced by Bravo that premiered on March 6, 2024. Developed as a spin-off of The Real Housewives of Beverly Hills, the documentary follows Erika Jayne as she returns to music following the embezzlement conviction of her husband, Thomas Girardi. The series was announced during BravoCon 2023 in Las Vegas.

== Premise ==
In late 2020, Erika Jayne's husband Thomas Girardi was charged with misappropriating client settlement funds in connection with an 2018 plane crash he settled on behalf of the victims. In the aftermath of Girardi's arrest, Jayne became the subject of numerous lawsuits. Jayne subsequently took a hiatus from music. In 2023, Jayne announced a residency at House of Blues Las Vegas inside the Mandalay Bay. The residency, lasting 11 dates between August 25th and December 2, represented Jayne's first return to music after Girardi's crimes became public. Erika Jayne: Bet It All on Blonde documents the days leading up to Jayne's residency.

== Cast ==
- Erika Jayne
- Mikey Minden
- Kevin Teasley

== Episodes ==
No.	Title	Original release date	U.S. viewers (millions)
1	"Part 1"	March 6, 2024	0.49
2	"Part 2"	March 6, 2024	0.40
