= Roller Coaster (Erika Jayne song) =

Single by Erika Jayne

from the album Pretty Mess
- Released: January 1, 2007
- Recorded: 2006
- Genre: House; EDM
- Length: 4:07
- Label: RM Records
- Songwriters: Peter Rafelson, Eric Kupper
- Producers: Ike Dirty; Eric Kupper; Peter Rafelson

Erika Jayne singles chronology
"Roller Coaster" (2007)	"Stars" (2007)

"Roller Coaster" is the debut single recorded by American singer and songwriter Erika Jayne for her debut studio album Pretty Mess (2009). Released as the album's lead single, the song was first distributed digitally on January 1, 2007, accompanied by a CD single released in the same month. The CD single included eleven remixes of the song in addition to the single version. The song was written by Peter Rafelson and Eric Kupper, and produced by Ike Dirty, Eric Kupper and Peter Rafelson.

Musically, the track is a house song, with EDM influences. "Roller Coaster" was well received by music critics. It peaked at number 30 on the Billboard Global Dance Songs, number one on the Hot Dance Club Songs chart and number 21 on U.S. Dance/Mix Show Airplay chart. People magazine described music video for "Roller Coaster", as "a monumental undertaking, shooting across multiple locations." The music video was shot in The Bahamas and at Stardust Resort and Casino in Las Vegas, Nevada. "It kind of turned out to be this all over the place, extravagant, over-the-top video," Erika Jayne told People in 2017.

== Track listing ==
CD single and digital download
No.	Title	Length
1.	"Roller Coaster"	4:07
2.	"Roller Coaster (Dirt Free) [Moto Blanco Radio Mix]"	3:10
3.	"Roller Coaster (Dirt Free) [Eric Kupper Radio Mix]"	3:39
4.	"Roller Coaster (Mark Knight's Toolroom Remix)"	6:57
5.	"Roller Coaster (DJ Escape & Johnny Vicious Main Mix)"	7:28
6.	"Roller Coaster (Eric Kupper's Extended Mix)"	6:39
7.	"Roller Coaster (Moto Blanco Club Mix)"	8:16
8.	"Roller Coaster (Dave Pezza Electro Club Mix)"	8:38
9.	"Roller Coaster (M2 Dub)"	5:51
10.	"Roller Coaster (Mark Knight's Toolroom Dub)"	6:56
11.	"Roller Coaster (Eric Kupper's Funked Up Dub)"	7:25
12.	"Roller Coaster (Rafe's Provocative Mix)"	4:28

== Charts ==
Charts (2007)	Peak position
Global Dance Songs (Billboard)	30
US Dance Club Songs (Billboard)	1
US Dance Airplay (Billboard)	21

== See also ==
- List of number-one dance singles of 2007 (US)
