= List of Billboard number-one dance songs of 2011 =

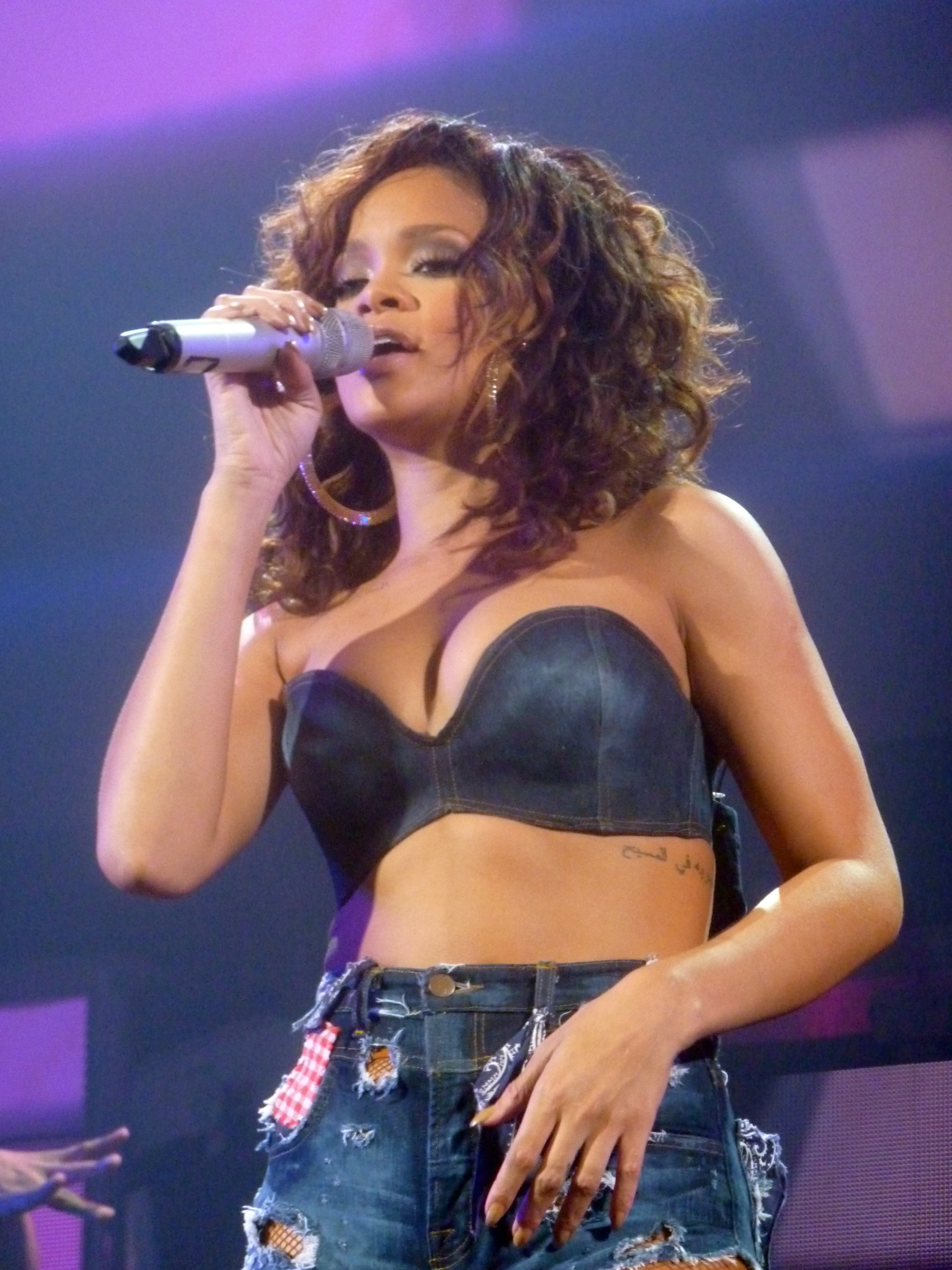
Rihanna achieved four number-one songs on the dance charts during 2011.

Billboard magazine compiled the top-performing dance songs in the United States during 2011 on the Dance Club Songs, the Dance Singles Sales, and the Dance Airplay. Premiered in 1976, the Dance Club Songs ranked the most popular songs on dance club based on reports from a national sample of club DJs. The Dance Singles Sales chart was launched in 1985 to compile the best-selling dance singles based on retail sales across the United States. The Dance Airplay was first published in 2003, ranking the songs based on airplay detections on dance radio.

The first club play number-one song of the year was by Swedish House Mafia and English rapper Tinie Tempah, with their collaboration "Miami 2 Ibiza". American singer-songwriter Katy Perry achieved three number-one songs on the chart, which included "Firework", "E.T. and "Last Friday Night (T.G.I.F.)". "E.T." ranked at number one on the 2011 Hot Dance Club Songs year end chart. Australian singer-songwriter Kylie Minogue also topped the chart three times, with the songs "Better than Today", "Higher", a collaboration with Taio Cruz and Travie McCoy, and "Put Your Hands Up (If You Feel Love)". American singer Britney Spears topped the chart three times with "Hold It Against Me", "Till the World Ends" and "I Wanna Go", from her seventh album Femme Fatale. Beyoncé and Jennifer Lopez also achieved three number one songs on the chart each, the former with "Run the World (Girls)", "Best Thing I Never Had", and "Countdown", and the latter with "On the Floor", "I'm Into You", and "Papi". off of her seventh studio album "Love?" marking a comeback for the singer. The American band Selena Gomez & the Scene also achieved three number one songs on the chart each with "A Year Without Rain", "Who Says" and "Love You like a Love Song".

Barbadian recording artist Rihanna topped the chart with four songs from three different albums; the first was French DJ David Guetta's song Who's That Chick?, from his album One More Love where Rihanna appeared as a guest vocalist, "S&M" and "California King Bed" from Rihanna's fifth album Loud, and "We Found Love"' from her sixth album Talk That Talk. "We Found Love", a collaboration with Scottish DJ Calvin Harris, was the only song to spend more than one week at number one, and topped the chart for two consecutive weeks. American singer-songwriter Lady Gaga also achieved four number one songs on the chart with "Born This Way", "Judas", "The Edge of Glory", and "You and I". British singer-songwriter Leona Lewis achieved her first number one on the chart with "Collide", a collaboration with Avicii.

== Charts history ==
Chart history
Issue date	Dance Club Songs		Dance Singles Sales		Dance Airplay		Ref.
Issue date	Song	Artist(s)	Song	Artist(s)	Song	Artist(s)	Ref.
January 1	"Miami 2 Ibiza"	Swedish House Mafia vs. Tinie Tempah	"Stereo Love"	Edward Maya & Vika Jigulina	"Take Over Control"	Afrojack featuring Eva Simons	
January 8	"Louder (Put Your Hands Up)"	Chris Willis	"Stereo Love"	Edward Maya & Vika Jigulina	"Firework"	Katy Perry	
January 15	"One Hot Pleasure"	Erika Jayne	"Stereo Love"	Edward Maya & Vika Jigulina	"Firework"	Katy Perry	
January 22	"Firework"	Katy Perry	"Stereo Love"	Edward Maya & Vika Jigulina	"Take Over Control"	Afrojack featuring Eva Simons	
January 29	"You Haven't Seen the Last of Me"	Cher	"The Time (Dirty Bit)"	The Black Eyed Peas	"Take Over Control"	Afrojack featuring Eva Simons	
February 5	"Tonight (I'm Lovin' You)"	Enrique Iglesias featuring Ludacris and DJ Frank E	"Stereo Love"	Edward Maya & Vika Jigulina	"Take Over Control"	Afrojack featuring Eva Simons	
February 12	"Who's That Chick?"	David Guetta featuring Rihanna	"Stereo Love"	Edward Maya & Vika Jigulina	"Hello"	Martin Solveig featuring Dragonette	
February 19	"A Year Without Rain"	Selena Gomez & the Scene	"Stereo Love"	Edward Maya & Vika Jigulina	"Hello"	Martin Solveig featuring Dragonette	
February 26	"Hello"	Martin Solveig and Dragonette	"Grenade"	Bruno Mars	"Hello"	Martin Solveig featuring Dragonette	
March 5	"Better than Today"	Kylie Minogue	"Stereo Love"	Edward Maya & Vika Jigulina	"Hello"	Martin Solveig featuring Dragonette	
March 12	"Move on Fast"	Ono	"Stereo Love"	Edward Maya & Vika Jigulina	"Hold It Against Me"	Britney Spears	
March 19	"Hold It Against Me"	Britney Spears	"Nobody"	Wonder Girls	"Hold It Against Me"	Britney Spears	
March 26	"Higher"	Taio Cruz featuring Kylie Minogue and Travie McCoy	"E.T."	Katy Perry	"Hold It Against Me"	Britney Spears	
April 2	"S&M"	Rihanna	"Born This Way"	Lady Gaga	"On the Floor"	Jennifer Lopez featuring Pitbull	
April 9	"On the Floor"	Jennifer Lopez featuring Pitbull	"Born This Way"	Lady Gaga	"Born This Way"	Lady Gaga	
April 16	"Born This Way"	Lady Gaga	"Born This Way"	Lady Gaga	"S&M"	Rihanna	
April 23	"E.T." †	Katy Perry	"Born This Way"	Lady Gaga	"More"	Usher	
April 30	"Good Girl"	Alexis Jordan	"Born This Way"	Lady Gaga	"E.T."	Katy Perry featuring Kanye West	
May 7	"Army of Love"	Kerli	"Born This Way"	Lady Gaga	"Mr. Saxobeat"	Alexandra Stan	
May 14	"Dancing Tonight"	Kat DeLuna	"Born This Way"	Lady Gaga	"E.T."	Katy Perry featuring Kanye West	
May 21	"Beautiful People"	Chris Brown featuring Benny Benassi	"Born This Way"	Lady Gaga	"Addiction"	Medina	
May 28	"Till the World Ends"	Britney Spears	"Born This Way"	Lady Gaga	"Mr. Saxobeat"	Alexandra Stan	
June 4	"Original Sin"	INXS featuring Rob Thomas & introducing DJ Yaleidys	"Born This Way"	Lady Gaga	"Mr. Saxobeat"	Alexandra Stan	
June 11	"Hollywood Tonight"	Michael Jackson	"Born This Way"	Lady Gaga	"Mr. Saxobeat"	Alexandra Stan	
June 18	"Fade"	Kristine W	"Born This Way"	Lady Gaga	"Mr. Saxobeat"	Alexandra Stan	
June 25	"Judas"	Lady Gaga	"Iron"	Woodkid	"Mr. Saxobeat"	Alexandra Stan	
July 2	"Call Your Girlfriend"	Robyn	"Born This Way"	Lady Gaga	"Mr. Saxobeat"	Alexandra Stan	
July 9	"Run the World (Girls)"	Beyoncé	"Born This Way"	Lady Gaga	"Party Rock Anthem"	LMFAO Featuring Lauren Bennett & GoonRock	
July 16	"Last Friday Night (T.G.I.F.)"	Katy Perry	"Born This Way"	Lady Gaga	"Party Rock Anthem"	LMFAO Featuring Lauren Bennett & GoonRock	
July 23	"I'm Into You"	Jennifer Lopez featuring Lil Wayne	"Born This Way"	Lady Gaga	"Party Rock Anthem"	LMFAO Featuring Lauren Bennett & GoonRock	
July 30	"Who Says"	Selena Gomez & the Scene	"The Edge of Glory"	Lady Gaga	"Party Rock Anthem"	LMFAO Featuring Lauren Bennett & GoonRock	
August 6	"Save the World"	Swedish House Mafia	"The Edge of Glory"	Lady Gaga	"Party Rock Anthem"	LMFAO Featuring Lauren Bennett & GoonRock	
August 13	"The Edge of Glory"	Lady Gaga	"Fire In Your Eyes"	B. Taylor Featuring Pauley Perrette	"What a Feeling"	Alex Gaudino Featuring Kelly Rowland	
August 20	"Dirty Dancer"	Enrique Iglesias with Usher featuring Lil Wayne	"On My Mind"	Cody Simpson	"I Wanna Go"	Britney Spears	
August 27	"I Wanna Go"	Britney Spears	"On My Mind"	Cody Simpson	"Save the World"	Swedish House Mafia	
September 3	"Put Your Hands Up (If You Feel Love)"	Kylie Minogue	"On My Mind"	Cody Simpson	"Save the World"	Swedish House Mafia	
September 10	"Best Thing I Never Had"	Beyoncé	"Feel So Close"	Calvin Harris	"Cinema"	Benny Benassi featuring Gary Go	
September 17	"Talking to the Universe"	Ono	"On My Mind"	Cody Simpson	"Save the World"	Swedish House Mafia	
September 24	"California King Bed"	Rihanna	"Born This Way"	Lady Gaga	"Pumped Up Kicks"	Foster the People	
October 1	"Collide"	Leona Lewis and Avicii	"On My Mind"	Cody Simpson	"Save the World"	Swedish House Mafia	
October 8	"I'm Still Hot"	Luciana	"You and I"	Lady Gaga	"Save the World"	Swedish House Mafia	
October 15	"Wepa"	Gloria Estefan	"Audio, Video, Disco"	Justice	"Save the World"	Swedish House Mafia	
October 22	"In the Dark"	Dev	"Born This Way"	Lady Gaga	"Save the World"	Swedish House Mafia	
October 29	"You and I"	Lady Gaga	"Video Games"	Lana Del Rey	"Without You"	David Guetta featuring Usher	
November 5	"Papi"	Jennifer Lopez	"Video Games"	Lana Del Rey	"In The Air"	Morgan Page, Sultan + Ned Shepard, and BT Featuring Angela McCluskey	
November 12	"Show Me"	Jessica Sutta	"Video Games"	Lana Del Rey	"Without You"	David Guetta featuring Usher	
November 19	"We Found Love"	Rihanna featuring Calvin Harris	"Video Games"	Lana Del Rey	"We Found Love"	Rihanna featuring Calvin Harris	
November 26	"We Found Love"	Rihanna featuring Calvin Harris	"Video Games"	Lana Del Rey	"We Found Love"	Rihanna featuring Calvin Harris	
December 3	"Sexy and I Know It"	LMFAO	"Video Games"	Lana Del Rey	"We Found Love"	Rihanna featuring Calvin Harris	
December 10	"Love You like a Love Song"	Selena Gomez & the Scene	"Video Games"	Lana Del Rey	"We Found Love"	Rihanna featuring Calvin Harris	
December 17	"I Like How It Feels"	Enrique Iglesias featuring Pitbull and The WAV.s	"Video Games"	Lana Del Rey	"We Found Love"	Rihanna featuring Calvin Harris	
December 24	"Countdown"	Beyoncé	"Video Games"	Lana Del Rey	"We Found Love"	Rihanna featuring Calvin Harris	
December 31	"Levels"	Avicii	"Video Games"	Lana Del Rey	"We Found Love"	Rihanna featuring Calvin Harris	

== See also ==
- 2011 in American music
- List of Billboard Hot 100 number ones of 2011
