= State Bar Court of California =

- Established: 1980s, began using full-time judges in 1989
- Location: California
- Composition method: Multiple individuals and bodies selecting
- Authorised by: California Business & Professions Code § 6075 et seq.
- Judge term length: 6 years
- Number of positions: 5 hearing judges, 2 review judges, 1 presiding judge
- Type of tribunal: State bar court
- Website: https://www.statebarcourt.ca.gov/

Presiding Judge
- Currently: Richard A. Honn

The State Bar Court of California serves as the administrative arm of the California Supreme Court in the adjudication of disciplinary and regulatory matters involving California attorneys. Although it is not formally a court of record, its judges are subject to admonition, censure, removal, or retirement by the Supreme Court upon the same grounds as provided for judges of courts of record in the state of California. The Court holds adversarial hearings between attorneys accused of misconduct and the Office of Chief Trial Counsel of the California State Bar.

== Background and Composition ==
The State Bar Court judges are nominated by a variety of individuals and bodies. Two of its five hearing judges are appointed by the California Supreme Court, and the remaining three are each selected by the Governor, Speaker of the Assembly and Senate Committee on Rules in turn; these judges constitute the Hearing Department, which is the trial level of the State Bar Court. The State Bar Court's appellate division, the Review Department, consists of two review judges and a presiding judge that are selected by the Supreme Court.

== Jurisdiction ==
The State Bar Court has jurisdiction over all attorney discipline matters in the State of California. The Court may discipline attorneys by public or private reproval and recommend a suspension of no more than three years for violations of the California Rules of Professional Conduct. In addition, where the State Bar Court is adjudicating attorney conduct which would warrant punitive action pursuant to the California Business and Professions Code, it may further make recommendations to the Supreme Court for a longer suspension, disbarment, or other discipline; however, it has no authority to impose such discipline on its own, and the 'first and only' decision imposing discipline is issued by the Supreme Court. It may also impose emergency suspensions when there is a substantial risk of harm to the public by an attorney's actions.
