= State Bar of California =

California's official attorney licensing agency

- Formation: July 29, 1927; 99 years ago
- Type: Unified bar
- Headquarters: San Francisco, California, United States
- Members: 286,809
- Website: calbar.ca.gov

The State Bar of California is an administrative division of the Supreme Court of California which licenses attorneys and regulates the practice of law in California. It is responsible for managing the admission of lawyers to the practice of law, investigating complaints of professional misconduct, prescribing appropriate discipline, accepting attorney-member fees, and financially distributing sums paid through attorney trust accounts to fund nonprofit legal entities. It is directly responsible to the Supreme Court of California. Its trustees are appointed by the Supreme Court, the California Legislature, and Governor of California. All attorney admissions are issued as recommendations of the State Bar, which are then routinely ratified by the Supreme Court. Attorney discipline is handled by the State Bar Office of Chief Trial Counsel, which acts as prosecutor before the State Bar Court of California. The State Bar has been cited for its corrupt practices during the 21st century, and is subject to reforms issued by its governing body, the California Supreme Court.

The State Bar was legally established on July 29, 1927, when the State Bar Act went into effect. The State Bar of California is the largest in the United States, with over 286,000 living members as of December 2022, of whom nearly 197,000 are on active status. It is headquartered in San Francisco, with a branch office in Los Angeles.

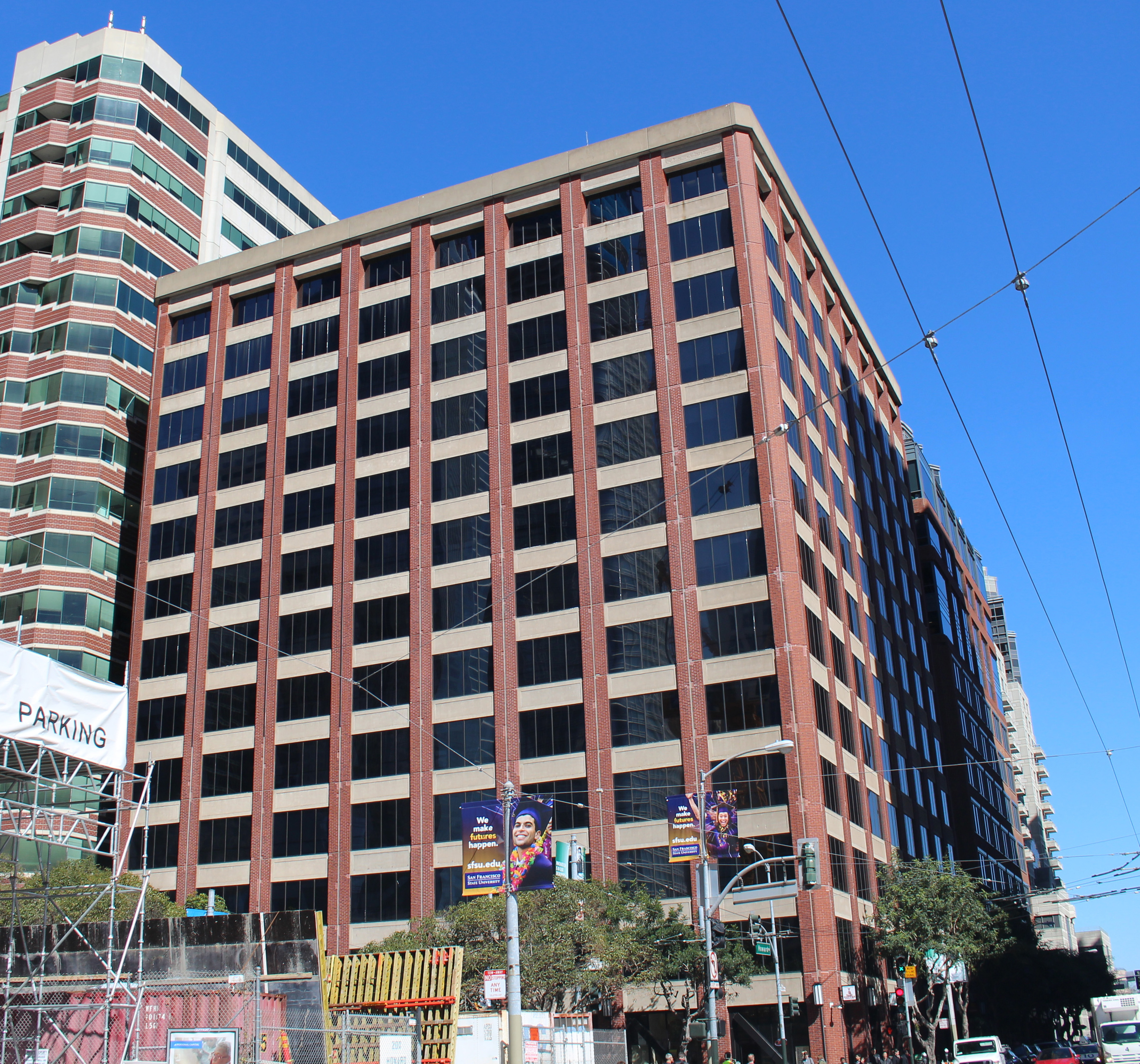
The State Bar's main office in San Francisco is housed on several floors of this office building.

At its inception, the State Bar was a "unified" bar in which disciplinary functions and more traditional "bar association" functions were joined into one entity. In 2018–2019, the State Bar was split into two entities: the State Bar of California became a standalone Government entity with legal enforcement via the State Bar Court.

The new entity split off from the State Bar of California became the California Lawyers Association (CLA) and took over certain functions such as education, lobbying, and annual meetings. Membership in the CLA is voluntary. Membership in the State Bar of California is mandatory for most practicing lawyers in California (the only exceptions being for very specific instances). The CLA is an NGO (Non-governmental organization).

== History ==
The State Bar's predecessor was a voluntary state bar association known as the California Bar Association. The leader of the effort to establish an integrated (official) bar was Judge Jeremiah F. Sullivan, who first proposed the concept at the California Bar Association's Santa Barbara convention in September 1917, and provided the California Bar Association with a copy of a Quebec statute as a model.

It took almost ten years to establish an integrated bar in California. Sullivan, who was also the President of the Bar Association of San Francisco, organized BASF committees to draft and propose appropriate legislation. Both BASF-drafted bills died in the California Legislature, in 1919 and 1921. In 1922, Sullivan finally persuaded the CBA to take action on his proposal; the California Bar Association drafted a new bill, lobbied lawyers and legislators around the state for their support, and persuaded the Legislature to pass the bill in 1925. That bill died by Governor Friend Richardson's pocket veto.

After two more years of lobbying, the CBA tried again. Governor C. C. Young signed the State Bar Act into law on March 16, 1927. On May 12, 1927, the Supreme Court of California appointed the State Bar Commission, which in turn established the State Bar of California as an operating entity with offices at 519 California Street in San Francisco on July 30, 1927. The State Bar immediately mailed out registration forms (demanding a $3 preorganization fee as authorized by the Act) to all California attorneys. Identification numbers were assigned to each attorney as they registered; notably, State Bar Number 1 went to Chief Justice William H. Waste.

By October 1, 1927, 7,872 lawyers had registered. These lawyers then voted by mail for the State Bar's first Board of Governors. On November 17, the State Bar held a preorganization dinner at the Palace Hotel in San Francisco, followed by the formal organization meeting the next day. By the time the dinner started, 9,602 lawyers had registered. The next morning, during the State Bar's organization meeting, the CBA yielded to its successor by winding up its affairs and ending its corporate existence.

=== Integrated bar ===
In 2018–2019, California joined the majority of American states that operate an integrated (mandatory) bar, in which the statewide bar association is integrated with the judiciary and active membership therein is required in order to practice law. Article 6, Section 9 of the California Constitution states:

The State Bar of California is a public corporation. Every person admitted and licensed to practice law in this State is and shall be a member of the State Bar except while holding office as a judge of a court of record.

The State Bar acts as the administrative arm of the California Supreme Court in matters involving the admission, regulation, and discipline of attorneys. Its structure, responsibilities and powers are elaborated in the State Bar Act, Sections 6000–6238 of the Business and Professions Code, as well as its own Rules of the State Bar of California and certain portions of the California Rules of Court.

Generally, practicing law in the state of California without being a licensee of the State Bar is the crime of unauthorized practice of law. There are limited exceptions such as for patent attorneys who restrict their practice to the prosecution of patent applications (i.e., the process of obtaining a patent before the United States Patent and Trademark Office); attorneys who practice areas of law exclusively regulated by the federal government (such as immigration) under a United States Supreme Court decision in 1963 that prohibited states from restricting the practice of exclusively federal areas of law; and attorneys from other states who have applied to the California courts for temporary admission pro hac vice to work on a single California case in collaboration with a licensee of the State Bar. Other exceptions include provisions for members of the military stationed with their spouses in California, registered in-house counsel, and registered legal aid attorneys.

Notably, the State Bar's board of trustees is no longer elected by the state's attorneys. Instead, the trustees are now appointed by the Supreme Court of California, the Governor of California and members of the California Legislature.

=== Divestment of voluntary bar functions ===
On October 2, 2017, Governor Jerry Brown signed into law Senate Bill 36. SB 36, sponsored by Hannah-Beth Jackson (D-Santa Barbara) which mandated the separation of the sections of the State Bar into a new 501(c)(6) entity. This Association was designed to house the 16 sections of the State Bar of California, as well as the California Young Lawyers Association. The sections provide low-cost continuing education for attorneys, which the State Bar of California requires. The sections also work with legislators to interpret, amend, and propose legislation. While lawyers are required to pay dues to the State Bar of California to practice law in the state, membership within the sections is voluntary. SB 36 helped formalize the separation, reauthorized mandatory dues for two years, and reduced the number of lawyers on the State Bar of California's board of trustees. The separation became official on January 1, 2018, with the launch of the California Lawyers Association.

The State Bar of California no longer performs educational or lobbying functions. Instead, its statutory mission involves activities to protect the public, increase access to legal services, and increase diversity in the legal profession. It administers the biannual bar examination for law students, processes complaints about attorney misconduct and the unauthorized practice of law, disciplines attorneys, and works with the California Supreme Court to consider and draft the Rules of Professional Conduct by which all California lawyers must conduct themselves. It collects and distributes legal aid funds and conducts an attorney census to publish demographics reports. It collects and maintains attorney records and collects licensing fees, and conducts limited services for licensees related to its current mission.

== Membership ==
=== Fee structure ===
The State Bar of California is one of a small number of State Bars whose member fee structure must be ratified annually by both the legislature and the governor. Without such annual reauthorization, it can charge California lawyers only $77 per year.

In 1990, the U.S. Supreme Court ruled in Keller v. State Bar of California that attorneys who are required to be members of a state bar association have a First Amendment right to refrain from subsidizing the organization's political or ideological activities as was the case with the California State Bar's activities.

In October 1997, Governor Pete Wilson vetoed the fee authorization bill for that year. He pointed out that California's bar had the highest annual fee in the country at $478. He also stated that the State Bar had become bloated and inefficient and criticized its Conference of Delegates for taking positions on divisive political issues like abortion. The State Bar's political and lobbying activities, combined with the compulsory nature of its dues, had already resulted in a U.S. Supreme Court case in which the State Bar was forced to allow attorneys to opt out of paying dues to support positions that they found abhorrent, Keller v. State Bar of California, 496 U.S. 1 (1990).

As a result, the State Bar was forced to lay off 500 of its 700 personnel on June 26, 1998. For six months, the State Bar's attorney disciplinary system was nonfunctional. On December 3, 1998, the Supreme Court of California unanimously held that it had the power to impose an emergency annual fee of $171.44 on all California lawyers to fund the attorney disciplinary system. See In re Attorney Disciplinary System, 19 Cal. 4th 582 (1998). By then, the backlog of unprocessed complaints had soared to 6,000.

On September 7, 1999, Governor Gray Davis signed a bill that set the annual fee for the State Bar at $395, thus ending the funding crisis. Since then, the State Bar has undertaken several reforms to improve the efficiency of its operations. In 2002, the State Bar split off the Conference of Delegates into a separate volunteer organization, now known as the Conference of California Bar Associations.

On October 11, 2009, Governor Arnold Schwarzenegger vetoed the fee authorization bill for 2010. In his veto message accompanying the return of the unsigned bill to the Legislature, he stated that just as in 1997, the State Bar had again become inefficient, scandal-ridden, and excessively politicized.

In 2015 and 2016, the California State Auditor's Office found that the State Bar was inefficient and had failed to properly engage with stakeholders. The State Auditor's Office also determined that the State Bar's financial reporting lacked transparency and had obscured a growing shortfall in its Client Security Fund, masking a high volume of claims that the State Bar expected the fund would be required to pay. Audits also found that the State Bar had created an unnecessary nonprofit organization and then used State Bar funds to cover the nonprofit's financial losses.

Another punitive lapse occurred in 2016, when the State Legislature allowed its session to end without enacting a bill authorizing the bar to collect lawyer fees in 2017.

In 2018, however, the State Bar "split" into two entities, with a newly appointee-only board of trustees. In late 2019, the State Legislature approved the first licensing fee increase for the State Bar in over 20 years. Annual licensing fees for active attorneys now total $510.00.

=== Admissions criteria ===
The task of deciding whom to admit to the bar is performed by the Committee of Bar Examiners and the Office of Admissions under procedures set out in the State Bar Act.

Prior to law schools in the U.S., the only way to become an attorney was to "read" for the law. Usually this was done by reading Blackstone's Commentaries on the Laws of England as a textbook, and by interning for a judge or a lawyer for a prescribed period. The Bar candidate would then be questioned by a panel of court justices and accepted or rejected as an officer of the court. If accepted, the candidate was sworn into the Bar.

California requires two years of pre-legal education before beginning the study of law. Once the pre-legal education is met, California has different paths to become a licensed attorney:

1. Attending a law school accredited by the American Bar Association or approved by the Committee of Bar Examiners and passing the California Bar Examination (bar exam).
2. Study law for at least four years by:
  * Attending a law school authorized by the State of California to award professional degrees that is not accredited by the ABA or approved by the State Bar of California. (including online law schools) and pass the bar exam, or
  * Participating in an approved course of study in a law office or the chambers of a judge and pass the bar exam. ("Law Office Study Program"; see below.)
3. Already being licensed in another state in the United States and taking the California Bar Exam. Lawyers who are already licensed (and have been active for four or more years) in another jurisdiction may be able to waive out of taking the Multistate Bar Examination portion of the bar exam.

Regardless of the path one takes to becoming a licensed attorney, most bar applicants take a special private preparation course for the bar exam immediately following their graduation from law school.

There is no citizenship requirement for admission to the California Bar Exam; a person can be a citizen of any country and be admitted to practice in California. No particular type of visa, including a green card, is required for admission to the bar. However, applicants must have a Social Security Number to apply. Applicants are able to petition for an exception to the latter rule.

Prospective applicants must also pass the Multistate Professional Responsibility Examination and undergo a background check to determine if the applicant has the "good moral character" necessary to practice law in California. A prospective applicant must receive a "positive determination" as to the inquiry on their "moral character" in addition to satisfying all other educational requirements and exam passages to be granted a license to practice law in California.

=== Examination routes ===
==== Accredited law school study ====
California is one of several states that allow study at law schools accredited by the American Bar Association and as well as other law schools. Through its Committee of Bar Examiners (CBE), the State Bar approves certain California law schools. Study at registered unaccredited law schools, including full-time online law schools, is also allowed. The majority of prospective lawyers studying for the California Bar attend law schools accredited by the ABA or approved by the CBE. Once they receive their J.D. degree from these schools they are eligible to take the bar exam.

==== Unaccredited law school study ====
Students may choose to become a licensed attorney through law schools that are not accredited by the ABA or approved by the State Bar of California Committee of Bar Examiners. Students attending these schools must also complete the First-Year Law Students' Examination (FYLSE, popularly known as the "baby bar") before receiving credit for their law study.

Students should pass the FYLSE within three administrations after first becoming eligible to take the examination (which usually occurs upon completion of the first year of law study) in order to receive credit for law study undertaken up to the point of passage. It is possible for a student to pass the test after the first three administrations, but such a student will receive credit only for their first year of law study; no courses beyond the first year will be credited if a student takes more law school classes and passes the baby bar thereafter.

==== Law Office Study Program ====
The California State Bar Law Office Study Program allows California residents to become California attorneys without graduating from college or law school, a process also known as reading law, assuming they meet basic pre-legal educational requirements. Candidates without a college degree may take and pass the College Level Examination Program (CLEP). The Bar candidate must study under a judge or lawyer for four years and must also pass the Baby Bar within three administrations after first becoming eligible to take the examination. They are then eligible to take the California Bar Examination.

==== Out-of-state attorney examination ====
Persons already licensed as attorneys in other states may take the California Bar. Provided they have already taken the Multistate Bar Examination (MBE), they may omit that portion of the California Bar Examination. The attorneys opting to omit the MBE must have four years of being in good standing in their local jurisdictions. Attorneys without the required years of being in good standing take the General Examination, like most other applicants.

=== California Bar Examination ===
California's bar exam is administered twice annually, in February and July. It is widely considered one of, if not the, most difficult bar examinations in the United States. Several prominent attorneys and politicians have either never passed, or had difficulty passing, the California Bar Exam. Significant among these are former Los Angeles Mayor Antonio Villaraigosa (a graduate of Peoples College of Law who never passed the bar exam after failing four times), Stanford Law School dean and Harvard Law School graduate Kathleen Sullivan (who failed the bar in July 2005 but passed on her second attempt in February 2006), California Governor and former Attorney General Jerry Brown, a graduate of Yale Law School (who failed his first attempt but passed on his second attempt), former California Governor Pete Wilson, a graduate of UC Berkeley School of Law (who passed on his fourth attempt), former San Francisco Board of Supervisors President Angela Alioto (who failed several times before passing) and former United States Secretary of the Interior William P. Clark Jr. (who failed his first attempt) [., and former White House Press Secretary Katie Zacharia whose exam results (failed in 2011 and did not reattempt) was the subject of media scrutiny during her brief tenure. Unsuccessful applicants have sued the State Bar—unsuccessfully—on the grounds that the exam is unnecessarily difficult.

Before July 2017, the California Bar Examination consisted of 18 hours of examination time spread out over three days; the only U.S. state with a longer bar exam was Louisiana, at 21.5 hours of testing. (Louisiana law, in contrast to the common law system of the other 49 states, is based partially on civil law and is one of the few exams without a multiple choice component.) Beginning in July 2017, the California Bar Exam adopted a 2-day format.

The exam currently tests 13 different subject areas:

- Constitutional Law (Federal)
- Contracts (Common Law and Uniform Commercial Code)
- Criminal Law and Procedure
- Evidence (Federal Rules of Evidence and the California Evidence Code)
- Real Property
- Torts
- Wills (California law)
- Trusts
- Civil Procedure (Federal Rules of Civil Procedure and the California Code of Civil Procedure)
- Community Property (California law)
- Professional Responsibility (California law and the ABA Model Rules of Professional Conduct)
- Business Associations (Corporations, Agency, all forms of Partnerships, and Limited Liability Entities)
- Remedies

The written section of the exam, which includes 5 essays and 1 90 minute performance test, accounts for 50% of the total score. Applicants sitting for the California Bar Examination do not know which of the 13 subjects listed above will in fact be tested on the essay portion of the examination. In recent years, it has been increasingly common for the exam to feature one or more "crossover" questions, which tests applicants in multiple subjects. Examples of past tested essays with sample answers are available on the California State Bar website.

California-specific legal knowledge is required only for Evidence, Civil Procedure, Wills, Community Property, and Professional Responsibility; for the other topics, either general common law ("bar exam law") or the federal laws apply. Beginning in July 2007, applicants may be tested on the California Evidence Code and the California Code of Civil Procedure in the essay portion of the exam in addition to the Federal Rules of Evidence and Federal Rules of Civil Procedure.

The Multistate Bar Examination (MBE) portion of the exam accounts for 50% of the total score and is a nationally administered, 200-question multiple choice exam. Of the 200 questions, only 175 questions are scored, while the other 25 are unscored experimental questions used to gauge their appropriateness for future exams. The MBE covers only the topics of contracts (including sales of goods under Article 2 of the Uniform Commercial Code), real property, torts, constitutional law, criminal law and procedure, the Federal Rules of Evidence, and the Federal Rules of Civil Procedure. While the essay section of the exam may test one or more of these areas as well, the MBE section is dedicated to these subjects.

The exam sites are usually large convention centers in Northern and Southern California. Exam security is tight. For example, proctors are assigned to stand in restrooms for the duration of the entire exam to prevent applicants from asking each other for assistance. Additionally, applicants are required to provide fingerprints, photo identification, and a handwriting sample at the testing site.

Overall bar exam pass rates tend to hover between 35% and 55%, and previously were often the lowest in the United States. In October 2017, the California Supreme Court reviewed the passing score of the California Bar Exam, after being urged by various law schools to lower the passing score. After review, the California Supreme Court initially declined to lower the passing score, leaving it intact. Finally in 2020 the California Supreme Court lowered the passing score, effective with the October 2020 bar exam onward. This change was made not only in light of the state of the COVID-19 pandemic, but also with renewed consideration of the review conducted in 2017. The passing score dropped from its previous requirement of 1440 to 1390.

The lowest pass rate occurred in February 2020 when 26.8% of takers passed. When considering only graduates of ABA-approved schools, the average pass rate for first timers in 2021 was 79%; for repeaters 26%, mirroring the percentage passing rates for all jurisdictions combined. The overall pass rate for the February 2022 California Bar Examination was 33.9%. The overall pass rate for the July 2022 California Bar Examination was 52.4%.

==== 2019 release of test subjects ====
In early July 2019, State Bar employees provided several high-ranking law school Deans with a list of the test subjects to be given on the bar exam in a few weeks' time. Some of these Deans shared this list with their students prematurely. Learning that only some schools had this information, the State Bar decided to release the shortened list to all exam takers. A report issued by the California Supreme Court concluded that the release was inadvertent "human error" but redacted the names of State Bar personnel responsible for the error.

==== 2024 vendor changes and exam issues ====
On August 14, 2024, California finalized a $8.25 million deal with test prep company Kaplan Exam Services to produce the state's bar exam for the next five years. The goal of the vendor switch was to plug the bar's increasing budget deficit by not having to follow the restrictions imposed by the Uniform Bar Exam, which required it to rent expensive conference venues. California Supreme court officially approved a change in modality to online and in person administration of the bar exam on October 22, 2024. The state bar also contracted Meazure Learning to develop the software for the online exams.

The rollout of the new exam format with a newly rewritten exam has been widely criticized as a disaster and complete failure. The state bar has sued Kaplan for, among other things, using AI to write questions containing typos and using non-lawyers to write exam questions. The bar also sued Meazure for numerous technical glitches during exam times, with numerous students being unable to complete their exams. The numerous issues faced has meant the state bar did not end up saving money from the vendor switch, as hoped, but rather incurred an additional $3 million of expenses. The State Supreme Court approved remedies including extensions to its Provisional License Program in attempts to alleviate some of the problems caused. Refunds and retakes have been offered to around 5,600 affected test takers.

=== Admission of undocumented immigrants ===
On February 1, 2014, Sergio C. Garcia, an undocumented immigrant, was sworn in as a member of the State Bar of California, making him the nation's first undocumented immigrant to become an attorney. The bar admission came almost one month after the state supreme court held that undocumented immigrants were not automatically disqualified from being licensed as attorneys in the state. Under that ruling, as well as a statute that Governor Brown signed into law taking effect on January 1, 2014 (in order to take advantage of a specific provision of the Personal Responsibility and Work Opportunity Act discussed at oral argument before the state supreme court), Garcia was admitted to the state bar.

=== Professional responsibility rules ===
==== Pre-2018 rules ====
Prior to November 1, 2018, California was the only state that did not use either set of professional responsibility rules developed by the American Bar Association. From 2001 to 2014, the Commission for the Revision of the Rules of Professional Conduct of the State Bar of California worked on a comprehensive revision of the California rules that was intended to, among other things, convert them into a heavily modified, localized version of the American Bar Association Model Rules of Professional Conduct. That is, the result would look like the Model Rules, but with modifications to preserve the substance of existing California rules that better reflect local laws and customs.

However, the commission's progress was very slow because there are so many substantive and structural differences between the California rules and the Model Rules. The Commission finally finished nearly all the revisions in 2010, and the State Bar Board of Governors (later renamed the board of trustees) ratified them in July and September 2010. However, the proposed revisions could not go into effect until the Supreme Court of California approved them. As of 2014, 11 of 67 proposed rules had been finalized and submitted to the Supreme Court for its approval.

On September 19, 2014, the Supreme Court of California returned to the State Bar all proposed revised rules that had been submitted for its consideration. The Court's letter directed the State Bar to start the process all over again with a new commission, and to submit a new set of revised rules by March 31, 2017.

==== 2018 revisions ====
On November 1, 2018, California adopted a new model code largely based on the ABA model rules, with some exceptions. California professional responsibility law is still divided among California Business & Professions Code Section 6068 (the statutory duties of an attorney), the California Rules of Professional Conduct (CRPC), and a number of uncodified cases. A number of innovations in professional responsibility law first arose in California, such as Cumis counsel.

Of all American states, California imposes one of the strongest duties of confidentiality upon its attorneys. There were no exceptions to the duty until 2004, when Business & Professions Code Section 6068 was amended to add a single discretionary exception to prevent imminent death or great bodily harm. The amendment was borrowed from the ABA Model Rules of Professional Conduct.

==== 2023 revisions ====
Responding to criticism of the Bar's corrupt oversight of disgraced attorney Tom Girardi, in November 2023, the Supreme Court of California adopted ethics reforms for State Bar of California officials and judges.

=== Lawyer discipline ===
As its primary post-split function, the Supreme Court of California operates the State Bar Court, staffed by judges who specialize in handling only professional responsibility cases full-time.

Complaints against attorneys are investigated and prosecuted by the State Bar's Office of the Chief Trial Counsel. Under the State Bar Act, upon receiving a complaint, the Bar may choose whether to open an investigation. If the Bar does find sufficient evidence of misconduct, decides that it has standing, and decides to take action to impose discipline, it has the power to proceed against accused attorneys either in the Supreme Court of California or in the State Bar Court. The State Bar holds that it may decline to review complaints that are not made by a judge who heard a matter related to the complaint.

Complaints of professional misconduct are usually first prosecuted in the Hearing Department of the State Bar Court. Lawyers disagreeing with an adverse decision may appeal to the Review Department of the State Bar Court, and from there to the state supreme court. Although the State Bar Court's decisions are technically only recommendations, the distinction is largely academic. Failure to comply with conditions imposed as part of any form of lesser discipline short of disbarment can itself result in a recommendation of disbarment, which is virtually always ratified because the attorney's noncompliance with the State Bar Act will have been clearly established by that point.

In February 2012, Jon B. Streeter, President of the State Bar, said:

Our role is roughly analogous to that of a criminal prosecutor.... The professional discipline of attorneys is not about punishment. For years, [the State Bar] has carried an enormous backlog ...averaging some 1,600–1,900 uncompleted investigations .... Any backlog—much less one of this magnitude—undermines our credibility with the public .... Only offending lawyers deserving of discipline benefit from delay....

== Licensee services ==
As a regulatory agency whose mission is now focused on public protection, the State Bar's services are focused on those necessary to meet its mission. The State Bar maintains licensee records and a searchable database of attorney profiles for the public on its website. To collect licensing fees that fund its operations, the State Bar sends out annual fee statements and collects fees.

Under the supervision of the Board of Legal Specialization, the State Bar officially certifies legal specialists in 11 different practice areas. It was first announced in February 1971 as the first such program anywhere in the United States. It began actual operations in 1973 with three practice areas initially available: workers' compensation, criminal law, and tax law.

The Minimum Continuing Legal Education Program, launched in 1990, certifies continuing legal education providers and enforces the MCLE requirement (currently 25 hours every three years) through random audits.

The Lawyer Assistance Program, created in 2002, assists lawyers with mental health and substance abuse problems.

The Mandatory Fee Arbitration Program, created in 1978, resolves attorney-client disputes over attorney fees. It is voluntary for clients but mandatory for attorneys if the client demands it.

With the split of professional association functions in 2018, member services were spun off. For example, an independent organization, CalBar Affinity, now maintains CalBar Connect, a website offering discounted products and services to California attorneys.

In November 2023, the State Bar of California became the first regulatory agency in the profession to pass disclosure and billing guidelines for member use of artificial intelligence (AI).

== Other responsibilities ==
In addition to disciplinary functions, the State Bar still operates several other non-disciplinary functions:

- The Committee on Judicial Nominees Evaluation, which conducts confidential evaluations of persons identified by the Governor as candidates for judicial office and produces a rating of "exceptionally well qualified," "well qualified," "qualified," or "not qualified."
- The State Bar's Office of Access and Inclusion carries out strategic objectives around diversifying the profession and supports the work of the Legal Services Trust Fund Commission, which oversees distribution of legal aid funds. The revenue comes from the state Interest on Lawyer Trust Accounts program, the Equal Access Fund, which is appropriated by the State Legislature, and the Justice Gap Fund, funded by voluntary donations from attorneys. In 2022, the State Bar distributed nearly $150 million in legal aid funding. The State Bar distributes these funds to approximately 100 nonprofit organizations that provide legal services to low-income Californians. Other access to justice initiatives include certifying lawyer referral services and encouraging and coordinating pro bono representation.
- The State Bar Client Security Fund Commission operates the Client Security Fund, which provides compensation for clients whose attorneys committed certain types of crimes against them like theft or embezzlement.

== Investigations and employee issues ==
=== Executive Director Joseph Dunn 2014 firing ===
On November 13, 2014, the State Bar issued a statement saying that former State Senator Joseph Dunn's employment as executive director had been terminated by the board of trustees. The same day, Dunn filed a whistle-blower lawsuit against the State Bar challenging the termination because he had exposed malfeasance and "egregious improprieties." The State Bar denied Dunn's allegations, saying the "Board received a complaint from a high-level employee raising serious, wide-ranging allegations about ... Dunn and certain State Bar employees." The lawsuit was eventually diverted into arbitration, and in March 2017, the arbitrator rejected Dunn's claims and exonerated the State Bar for his firing. In July 2022, the State Bar issued a Notice of Disciplinary Charges against Joe Dunn. After dismissing most charges against him, in February 2023, Judge Yvette D. Roland of the State Bar Court of California, in September 2023, denied Dunn's second motion to dismiss remaining charges, setting a trial commencement date of November 29, 2023.

=== State Bar internal corruption ===
The Bar hired Los Angeles law firm Halpern May Ybarra Gelberg to conduct an internal investigation in February 2023, which found that State Bar employees had accepted gifts, travel, meals, and other things of value from the Girardi & Keese law firm. This influenced the State Bar to block and bury complaints against the law firm. The State Bar disclosed that, across four decades, during which it had received 205 complaints against Thomas Girardi – including accusations that he had stolen tens of millions of dollars from his clients, the Bar took no action against the attorney and dismissed the cases. In 2024 Girardi, following decades of protection from the Bar, was found guilty in court of wire fraud and embezzlement, and was sentenced to an 87-month prison term.

In 2009, long-time member and Girardi & Keese partner Howard Miller had been elected, uncontested, as the State Bar's 85th president. In 2021, the Los Angeles Times reported that Miller had led the board of trustees to force out its director, recruiting another Girardi ally, Joe Dunn, to replace Judy Johnson, its longest-serving executive director following two terms as its chief trial counsel, overseeing attorney discipline in California.
