= One Hot Pleasure =

Single by Erika Jayne
- Released: November 16, 2010
- Recorded: 2010
- Length: 3:38
- Label: Pretty Mess Records
- Songwriter(s): Dave Audé; Luciana Caporaso; Nick Clow
- Producer(s): Dave Audé

Erika Jayne singles chronology
"Pretty Mess" (2010)	"One Hot Pleasure" (2010)	"Party People (Ignite the World)" (2011)

"One Hot Pleasure" is a song recorded by American singer and songwriter Erika Jayne. It reached number one on Billboard's Hot Dance Club Play chart in 2011. "One Hot Pleasure" became Jayne's fifth number one single on the Hot Dance Club Play chart.

== Critical reception ==
In 2016, Conor Behan of PopCrush wrote that "if Britney and Kylie teamed up for a David Guetta track circa 2011, it would probably have sounded like this." Behan described the song as a "saucy floor-filler that would still sound fresh if some big name pop titan released the same track today."

== Background and composition ==
"One Hot Pleasure" was written by Dave Audé, Luciana Caporaso, and Nick Clow, while Audé handled its production. It was the first song released from Jayne's own record label, Pretty Mess Records, which she established in 2010.

== Music video ==
The official music video for "One Hot Pleasure" was directed by Jayne's longtime collaborator and choreographer Mikey Minden.

== Track listings and formats ==
- CD maxi single
1. "One Hot Pleasure" (Original Radio Edit) – 3:38
2. "One Hot Pleasure" (Video Version) – 4:00
3. "One Hot Pleasure" (Extended Version) – 6:42
4. "One Hot Pleasure" (Dave Audé Remix) – 8:34
5. "One Hot Pleasure" (Ralphi Rosario Club Mix) – 6:56
6. "One Hot Pleasure" (Sultan & Ned Shepard One Hot Remix) – 8:09
7. "One Hot Pleasure" (Dirtyloud Vocal Mix) – 6:02
8. "One Hot Pleasure" (DJ Mr. White Remix) – 5:45
- CD single "The Club Mixes"
1. "One Hot Pleasure" (Video Version) – 4:00
2. "One Hot Pleasure" (Extended Version) – 6:42
3. "One Hot Pleasure" (Dave Audé Remix) – 8:34
4. "One Hot Pleasure" (Sultan & Ned Shepard One Hot Remix) – 8:04
5. "One Hot Pleasure" (Ralphi Rosario Club Mix) – 6:56
6. "One Hot Pleasure" (Dirtyloud Vocal Mix) – 6:02
7. "One Hot Pleasure" (DJ Mr. White Remix) – 5:45
- CD single "The Dub Mixes"
1. "One Hot Pleasure" (Dave Audé Club Dub) – 8:04
2. "One Hot Pleasure" (Sultan & Ned Shepard One Hot Dub Mix) – 7:26
3. "One Hot Pleasure" (Dirtyloud Dub Mix) – 6:02
4. "One Hot Pleasure" (Ralphi Rosario's One Hot Dub) – 7:57
- CD single "The Radio Mixes"
1. "One Hot Pleasure" (Original Radio Edit) – 3:38
2. "One Hot Pleasure" (Dave Audé Radio) – 3:54
3. "One Hot Pleasure" (Ralphi Rosario Edit) – 3:34
4. "One Hot Pleasure" (Sultan & Ned Shepard One Hot Remix) – 4:03
5. "One Hot Pleasure" (Dirtyloud Vocal Mix) – 3:34
6. "One Hot Pleasure" (DJ Mr. White Remix) – 4:26
- DVD single "The Video"
1. "One Hot Pleasure" (The Video) – 4:00

== Charts ==
Chart (2011)	Peak position
Global Dance Songs (Billboard)	24
US Dance Club Songs (Billboard)	1

== Release history ==
Country	Date	Format	Label	Ref.
Worldwide	November 16, 2010	Digital download	Pretty Mess Records	

== See also ==
- List of number-one dance singles of 2011 (US)
