= Stars (Erika Jayne song) =

Single by Erika Jayne

from the album Pretty Mess
- Released: December 6, 2007
- Recorded: 2007
- Genre: House; EDM
- Length: 4:17
- Label: RM Records
- Songwriter(s): Peter Rafelson, Eric Kupper
- Producer(s): Ike Dirty; Eric Kupper; Peter Rafelson

Erika Jayne singles chronology
"Roller Coaster" (2007)	"Stars" (2007)	"Give You Everything" (2009)

"Stars" is a song recorded by American singer and songwriter Erika Jayne for her debut studio album Pretty Mess (2009). Released as the album's second single, the song was first distributed digitally on December 6, 2007, accompanied by a CD single released in the same month. The CD single included nine remixes of the song in addition to the single version. "Stars" is featured in the comedy film American Summer (2011) starring Efren Ramirez and Matthew Lillard.

Musically, the track is a house song, with an EDM influence. Commercially successful, "Stars" managed to peak at number one on the US Billboard Hot Dance Club Play in 2008, becoming her second consecutive single to do so, following "Roller Coaster". Music video for the song was directed by actor and film director Scott Speer. The music video for "Stars" spent 12 weeks (peaking at number 2) on Logo TV’s The Click List: Top 10 Videos.

== Track listing ==
CD single and digital download
No.	Title	Length
1.	"Stars"	4:17
2.	"Stars (Moto Blanco's Radio Edit)"	3:47
3.	"Stars (Steve Mac Remix)"	6:47
4.	"Stars (DJ Escape & Johnny Vicious Club Mix)"	8:54
5.	"Stars (Moto Blanco Remix)"	7:39
6.	"Stars (Tony Moran & Warren Riggs Peak Club Mix)"	8:12
7.	"Stars (Eric Kupper's Poolside Mix)"	7:28
8.	"Stars (Mike Rizzo Club Mix)"	7:34
9.	"Stars (Peter Rafelson Retro Mix)"	8:16
10.	"Stars (Cagedbaby Disco Mix)"	7:30

== Charts ==
=== Weekly charts ===
Chart (2008)	Peak position
Global Dance Songs (Billboard)	33
US Dance Club Songs (Billboard)	1
US Dance/Mix Show Airplay (Billboard)	1

=== Year-end charts ===
Chart (2008)	Position
US Dance Club Songs (Billboard)	15

== See also ==
- List of number-one dance singles of 2008 (US)
