= Erika Jayne Presents: The Pretty Mess Tour =

2018 concert tour by Erika Jayne

- Tour by Erika Jayne
- Start date: September 28, 2018
- End date: December 21, 2018
- Legs: 2
- No. of shows: 13 in North America

Erika Jayne Presents: The Pretty Mess Tour was the first headlining concert tour by American singer and songwriter Erika Jayne, consisting of 13 shows in the United States. The tour began on September 28, 2018 and ended on December 21, 2018, with a time-out for the month of November.

The tour, divided in three segments, opens with her single "Xxpensive". The second segment displays upbeat dance numbers and ends with a performance inspired by the very beginning of Erika Jayne. The third section features an over-the-top theme with sparkly outfits.

== Background ==
Jayne announced her debut concert tour in early August 2018. It consisted of 13 shows solely in the United States. The concert tour begins on September 28 and ended on December 21, 2018. It was reported on September 13, 2018, that her concert at Lincoln Hall in Chicago was sold out. Jayne and Fullscreen Live announced eight additional dates to the tour schedule on September 24, 2018. She said the shows will be “fantasy, love, escape, glitz, glamour and fun.”

Greg Willis of Out wrote "if her set on this new tour is anything like her headlining set at LA Pride in 2017 (where along with her own hits, she performed a cover of 90s dance classic “This Is Your Night” by Amber), then we are definitely in for a treat." Jayne's longtime collaborator, Mikey Minden, served as creative director of the tour. People magazine published exclusive sketches of Jayne's tour costumes on September 28, 2018. "Creating these costumes from scratch was a dream come true. These looks describe different aspects of my personality and capture the essence of the show," Jayne told People.

Speaking on the tour, Jayne stated:

"I'm so excited to get back on the stage this fall for The Pretty Mess Tour! The best part of it all is finally getting to meet so many fans across the county. Get ready, my pretties!"

== Critical reception ==
Alice Laussade of D magazine wrote that "if you know Erika Jayne’s NSFW style of music, you wouldn’t guess that she and Taylor Swift have similar fan bases. I would, though, because I know a lot of moms. Moms scream-sing Taylor Swift with their kids in the morning carpool line, and watch Bravo’s The Real Housewives of Beverly Hills while they chug cans of wine at night." Laussade also noted that fan fashion was part of the concert, seeing fans wearing "thigh-high boots, sequins, pink leather jackets paired with crazy-long blonde extensions, white Sambas paired with fancy athleisurewear, and a group of folks in SeeYouNextTuesday* shirts (of course, referencing her golden necklace worn on RHOBH)."

Nina Bradley of Bustle wrote that "with a New York Times bestseller and a recent TED Talk now added to her impressive résumé, Erika Jayne's upcoming Pretty Mess tour is just the latest must-see event to come from the reality star — which means tickets are going to go fast." Several celebrities, including January Jones, Jasmine Tookes, Kyle Richards and Lisa Rinna came to support her concert at The Globe Theater. Melissa Gorga of The Real Housewives of New Jersey took a photo of Erika Jayne and her dancers on stage at a sold-out show in Jersey City and later offered a favorable review of the show in an Instagram post.

== Shows ==
List of concerts, showing date, city, country and venue
| Date | City | Country | Venue |
|---|---|---|---|
| September 28, 2018 | Jersey City | United States | White Eagle Hall |
| October 5, 2018 | Dallas | United States | Granada Theater |
| October 7, 2018 | San Francisco | United States | City Nights |
| October 14, 2018 | Los Angeles | United States | Globe Theater |
| October 21, 2018 | Chicago | United States | Lincoln Hall |
| December 9, 2018 | Miami | United States | Revolution Live |
| December 10, 2018 | Orlando | United States | The Plaza Live |
| December 11, 2018 | Atlanta | United States | Center Stage |
| December 14, 2018 | Nashville | United States | Cannery Ballroom |
| December 16, 2018 | Charlotte | United States | The Fillmore Charlotte |
| December 18, 2018 | Washington, D.C. | United States | The Howard Theater |
| December 20, 2018 | Boston | United States | Royale |
| December 21, 2018 | Westbury | United States | The Space at Westbury |
