= Paul Kemsley =

English businessman (born 1967)

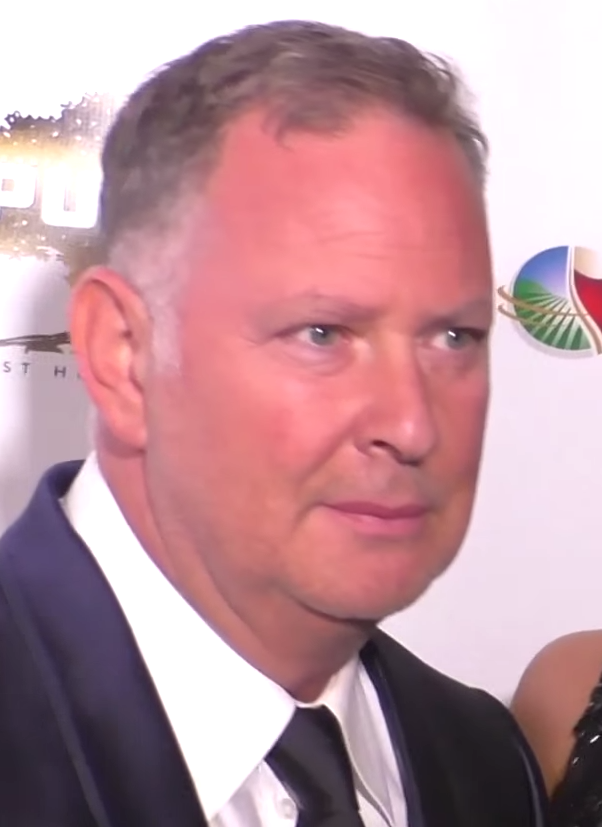
- Kemsley in 2016
- Born: 23 August 1967 (age 59); Stanmore, Middlesex, England
- Occupations: Businessman; football chairman; property developer
- Known for: The Real Housewives of Beverly Hills
- Spouses: Loretta Gold (m. 1991; div. 2011); Dorit Kemsley (m. 2015; sep. 2024)
- Children: 5

Paul Zeital Kemsley (born 23 August 1967) is an English businessman, property developer and media personality. Since 2016, he has regularly appeared on the American reality television show The Real Housewives of Beverly Hills, alongside his ex-wife Dorit Kemsley. He is the former Vice-Chairman of Premier League football club Tottenham Hotspur and former chairman of the revived New York Cosmos.

== Early life ==
He was educated at Atholl School in Rayners Lane, Harrow. At the age of 15, Kemsley worked on Saturdays at John Paul Menswear, which led him to meeting Mike Ashley, who opened his first Sports World equipment outlet across the road. They would play darts for money on quiet afternoons.

== Career ==
Kemsley left school in 1984, at the age of 17, and began working at Gross Fine as a junior surveyor. From 1985 to 1992, Kemsley worked as an agent at the commercial real-estate firm Ross Jaye. In 1992, he decided to leave and join his old friend Ashley at Sports Direct where he helped to expand the group.

=== Rock Joint Ventures Ltd ===
By 1995, Kemsley wanted to start his own business and he established a property and securities company with "the £1,800 he had left in his pocket." This was Rock Joint Ventures Ltd, formed with Joe Lewis of ENIC Group, a British investment company, and Spurs chairman Daniel Levy. Rock was an investor and developer of commercial and residential property, but specialized in land trading. It also had a private hedge fund that specialized in acquiring strategic stakes in public companies, the most well-known being their 28% share in Countryside Properties plc in 2004, which they sold to the chairman for a profit of £12 million.

By 2007, Rock's property portfolio was valued at £750 million. Lewis parted from the company around that time. It set up a joint venture with HBOS to build a £1bn property portfolio. However, during the 2008 financial crisis, Rock was placed into administration in June 2009, ending Kemsley's involvement. The administrator PwC began selling the major properties of the portfolio, which included the Selhurst Park stadium, in October 2009. HBOS lost hundreds of millions of pounds, and Peter Cummings, the banker who had promoted the joint investments in Kemsley's portfolio, was fined £500,000 by the FSA in 2012. In a lawsuit filed by Kemsley's former partners against HBOS, Kemsley was accused of being involved in a "self-dealing" transaction around a $35 million personal loan from HBOS.

Kemsley was well known as an aggressive player in the property business. In his most successful property deal, he bought 27–35 Poultry, an office block in the City of London, for £40 million in May 2006. He then sold it within five months to a former Russian government minister for £72 million. He has developed successful investments in various online betting operators including Party Gaming, Chinese-licensed Betex, and AIM-quoted FUN Technologies.

His personal wealth was estimated at £180 million in the Sunday Times Rich List 2008, and he was noted as actively supporting various charitable causes. However, in September 2008, he placed a series of large bets that doomed US bank Lehman Brothers would recover, and in May 2009, the spread betting company Spreadex took legal action against him, claiming that he was liable to pay a margin call of £2 million.

=== Tottenham Hotspur F.C. ===
Kemsley was a director of Spurs from 2001 through 2006, and Vice-Chairman of the club at the time of his departure in 2007. Levy announced that Kemsley was resigning to focus on his property interests in the United States, but the abrupt departure invited speculation that Kemsley's relationship with Levy had soured. Kemsley's resignation came just weeks after he had been part of a delegation that traveled to Spain in an attempt to sign manager Juande Ramos, a move that was characterized as "mishandled" and which "undermined the club's start to the Premier League season".

=== The Apprentice ===
Kemsley is known as a close friend of Mike Ashley, David Pearl, Sir Philip Green and Lord Sugar. It was through his friendship with Sugar that Kemsley played a part in the ENIC/Levy partnership's purchase of a majority share holding in Tottenham Hotspur. Kemsley later appeared as one of Lord Sugar's interviewer/advisors on the UK BBC edition of The Apprentice from 2005 to 2008, but left the show after Rock failed. He explained that he quit because his role no longer made sense following his bankruptcy: "Inevitably people were going to say: 'Who are you to interview anyone? You've just gone bust.'"

=== New York Cosmos ===
In 2010, he led a relaunch of the New York Cosmos soccer club, on the advice of his friend and associate Jeffrey Akiki. As chairman, he was the public representative of the majority ownership group, who remained anonymous but were reportedly Saudi Arabian. He signed a merchandising deal with sportswear manufacturer Umbro and insisted that the club's goal was to join Major League Soccer Kemsley installed soccer legend and former Cosmos star Pelé as Honorary President, and in January 2011 appointed former Manchester United player Eric Cantona as Director of Soccer, although the club would later claim in court that Cantona was never intended to be more than a promotional figurehead. Kemsley stepped away from the club in October of 2011, as the New York Post reported that the owners "apparently tired of the flamboyant Brit, who was long on flash but has to this point been short of substance".

=== Legends 10 ===
In his position as Cosmos chairman, Kemsley got involved with Pelé when he flew to Brazil to enlist his help in reviving the brand. Kemsley and Cosmos Vice President Terry Byrne formed a management agency originally named "Sport 10" to handle the former superstar's merchandising and promotional deals. Kemsley kept his position as CEO of the agency, later renamed "Legends 10", after leaving the Cosmos.

=== Personal bankruptcy ===
In March 2012, Kemsley filed for bankruptcy listing expenses of $34k per month and personal debts ranging from $10M–$50M with debts to creditors including Spreadex, HMRC, HBOS and Joe Lewis. However, Barclays Bank continued legal action in the United States over a £5 million loan to him. In March 2013, the United States Bankruptcy Court initially found against the trustee who had applied for chapter 15 bankruptcy. Judge Peck denied this application, calling Kemsley "a bankrupt who doesn't live like one". However, two months later in state court, Peck denied Barclays' claim, saying Barclays had effectively "mousetrapped" themselves in extending the loan to Kemsley.

== Personal life ==
Kemsley was married to Loretta Kemsley (née Gold) from Portsmouth. The couple have three children and were living in Radlett, Hertfordshire in 2007, before moving to America. His wife and children returned to London in 2012.

In March 2015, Kemsley married Dorit Kemsley (née Lemel) in New York City. He has a son and a daughter from his second marriage. Dorit Kemsley appears as a cast member on The Real Housewives of Beverly Hills, having joined at the start of season 7. In May 2024, it was announced that the couple had separated after 9 years of marriage.
