= How Many Fucks =

Single by Erika Jayne
- Released: April 19, 2016
- Recorded: 2015–16
- Genre: Pop-rap; EDM
- Length: 3:17
- Label: Pretty Mess Records
- Songwriter(s): Justin Tranter; Myah Marie
- Producer(s): GAGE

Erika Jayne singles chronology
"Crazy" (2015)	"How Many Fucks" (2016)	"Xxpen$ive" (2017)

"How Many Fucks" (censored as "How Many F**ks") is a song recorded by American singer Erika Jayne and released as her second album's lead single.

The song was written by Justin Tranter and Myah Marie, while Adam "Gage" Bruce solely produced the track. The single is a pop-rap and EDM track that discusses living carefree and without doubt.

== Background and composition ==
"How Many Fucks" was written by Justin Tranter and Myah Marie, while its production was handled by Adam "Gage" Bruce. It is a pop rap song with a heavy beat. Erica Russell from Pop Crush called it a "bouncy electro-pop/hip-hop track" that confirms Jayne's "philosophy" of "take nothing seriously".

== Critical reception ==
After its release, "How Many Fucks" received generally favorable reviews from contemporary music critics. In a highly positive review, Julia Brucculieri of The Huffington Post praised both the track and its corresponding video for being catchy and sexy. Erika Harwood of MTV called it "perfect". Idolator's Mike Wass was more critical of the song, describing it as a "parody of her old material". Jessica P. Ogilvie of Los Angeles Magazine called the song "an instant classic" and "amazing".

== Music video ==
A music video, directed by Mikey Minden, was released on April 19, 2016, and . In the video, Jayne wears several "rather risqué" costumes, including a "money-print dress" and shimmery clothing to appear as a "golden goddess". According to E! Online, several of the dance moves performed are not safe for work. Evan Real of Us Weekly described the video as Jayne "show[ing] off her killer curves in a variety of skin-baring ensembles as she cavorts across mini-movie's several sets."

=== Synopsis ===
The video opens with Jayne exiting a Lamborghini into an empty warehouse along with two backup dancers. The song begins and the three begin to twerk and perform choreography. Various scenes show Jayne licking a lollipop in a pink room while wearing pink clothing, in addition to her wearing gold clothing in a gold room while caressing her jacket seductively. Other scenes include Jayne sitting atop a Ferrari and whipping her hair back and forth. According to Us Weekly, the scene where Jayne utters "Alligator, alligator dripping stones / 18 carat, 18 carat up in my bones" reportedly refers to her relationship with The Real Housewives of Beverly Hills's co-star, Lisa Vanderpump.

== Formats and track listings ==
Digital download
No.	Title	Length
1.	"How Many Fucks"	3:17

Digital download (Remixes)
No.	Title	Length
1.	"How Many F***s" (Autoerotique Remix)	3:09
2.	"How Many F***s" (DJLW Remix)	4:15
3.	"How Many F***s" (David Aude Remix)	5:16
4.	"How Many F***s" (RNG Remix)	5:36

== Charts ==
Chart (2016)	Peak; position
US Dance Club Songs (Billboard)	1

== Release history ==
Country	Date	Format	Label	Ref.
Worldwide	April 19, 2016	Digital download	Pretty Mess Records	

== See also ==
- List of number-one dance singles of 2016 (U.S.)
