= Painkillr =

Single by Erika Jayne
- Released: August 26, 2014
- Recorded: 2014
- Length: 3:16
- Label: Pretty Mess
- Songwriter(s): Erika Jayne; Christopher Rodriguez

Erika Jayne singles chronology
"Get It Tonight" (2013)	"Painkillr" (2014)	"You Make Me Wanna Dance" (2014)

"Painkillr" is a song recorded by American singer and songwriter Erika Jayne. It reached number one on Billboard's Hot Dance Club Play chart in 2014. "Painkillr" was written by Erika Jayne and Christopher Rodriguez. Erika Jayne has described the song by saying: "The idea came to me one night from a darker place. It was how I was feeling at the time. Obviously, with that type of material, it's not set very high in the register. So we set it low, made it yummy, sexy and 1930-ish."

== Music video ==
The black-and-white music video shows Jayne in bed wearing a revealing bodysuit and heels. It was produced by Jayne herself and shot in half a day. "I had a photoshoot in the morning, and then shot it in the afternoon. That's how tight that video was," she told People magazine. The music video was directed by her long-time collaborator Mikey Minden. Minden described that the music video was intended to be "edgy, dark, gritty, in-your-face, provocative, super-sexy, super-stylized, and very theatrical."

Television personality Bethenny Frankel criticized the music video in an episode of The Real Housewives of Beverly Hills in 2016.

== Track listing ==
Over twenty different remixes and radio edits were created specifically for the digital download release of "Painkillr";

Digital download
No.	Title	Length
1.	"Painkillr"	3:16
2.	"Painkillr" (DJLW Radio Edit)	3:18
3.	"Painkillr" (Cole Plante Radio Edit)	3:52
4.	"Painkillr" (DJ-Spin Radio Edit)	3:46
5.	"Painkillr" (Oliver Twizt Radio Edit)	2:26
6.	"Painkillr" (Dem Slackers Radio Edit)	3:24
7.	"Painkillr" (Victor Dinaire & Bissen Radio Edit)	3:01
8.	"Painkillr" (Casey Alva Radio Edit)	3:40
9.	"Painkillr" (Mike Cruz Tribal EDM Mix)	8:00
10.	"Painkillr" (DJLW Remix)	4:33
11.	"Painkillr" (DJLW Dub)	4:33
12.	"Painkillr" (Cole Plante Remix)	6:00
13.	"Painkillr" (DJ-Spin Remix)	6:09
14.	"Painkillr" (DJ-Spin Dub)	5:54
15.	"Painkillr" (Oliver Twizt Remix)	4:00
16.	"Painkillr" (Oliver Twizt Dub)	4:00
17.	"Painkillr" (Dem Slackers Club Mix)	6:03
18.	"Painkillr" (Dem Slackers Dub)	6:03
19.	"Painkillr" (Victor Dinaire & Bissen Remix)	6:30
20.	"Painkillr" (Victor Dinaire & Bissen Dub)	6:30
21.	"Painkillr" (Casey Alva Vicodin Remix)	6:10
22.	"Painkillr" (Mike Cruz Tribal EDM Mix)	8:00

== Charts ==
=== Weekly charts ===
Chart (2014)	Peak position
US Dance Club Songs (Billboard)	1
US Hot Dance/Electronic Songs (Billboard)	25

=== Year-end charts ===
Chart (2014)	Position
US Dance Club Songs (Billboard)	46

== Release history ==
Country	Date	Format	Label	Ref.
United States	August 26, 2014	Digital download	Pretty Mess	

== See also ==
- List of number-one dance singles of 2014 (US)
