= Girardi & Keese =

Defunct American law firm

- Headquarters: Los Angeles
- Date founded: 1965
- Founder: Thomas Girardi, Robert Keese
- Dissolved: January 2021
- Website: Girardi & Keese at the Wayback Machine (archived December 3, 2020)

Girardi & Keese or Girardi Keese was a Los Angeles law firm headquartered on Wilshire Boulevard. It was founded in 1965 by lawyers Thomas Girardi and Robert Keese. It was known for representing plaintiffs against major corporations, including Merck, Boeing and Pacific Gas & Electric. Chapter 7 Bankruptcy claims were filed by creditors against the firm in December 2020 and it was defunct by January 2021.

Girardi and Christopher Kamon, the firm's accountant, were indicted in Los Angeles in 2023 by a federal grand jury for allegedly embezzling more than $15 million from several of the firm's legal clients. Girardi, Kamon and attorney David Lira are also facing disbarment trials and federal wire fraud charges in Chicago.

== Prominent cases ==
=== Pacific Gas & Electric ===
One of the firm's best known cases was against Pacific Gas & Electric (PG&E). Residents of the Mojave Desert community of Hinkley, California, blamed incidents of cancer and other diseases on contaminated water leaked from a gas pumping station owned and operated by PG&E. In 1996 the utility company agreed to settle for $333 million, the largest ever paid in a direct-action lawsuit at the time. The case was the inspiration for the film Erin Brockovich (2000) starring Julia Roberts. Girardi was thanked in the credits and served as an adviser on the film.

In 2019, PG&E counter-sued the Law Finance Group, which sued Girardi for funds that he borrowed on behalf of clients. The litigation funder's lawyer said the loan agreement states the loan was to Girardi and his firm.

=== Merck ===
In 2007, Merck created a $4.85 billion settlement fund for the thousands of plaintiffs who complained of complications associated with its pain medication Vioxx. It is believed to have been the largest drug settlement ever.

=== Lion Air crash ===
The firm represented some of the families affected by the October 2018 crash of Lion Air Flight 610 in Indonesia that killed 189 people aboard the plane. Boeing, the maker of the 737 MAX aircraft, reportedly settled cases for at least $1.2 million per claim. Rather than sending their clients all of their settlement money, federal prosecutors in 2023 said Girardi and his co-defendants embezzled more than $3 million and used it to pay for the law firm's operating expenses and payroll, to pay off credit card bills, and to fund settlements to other clients "whose own settlement funds previously had been misappropriated" by the firm.

Girardi has been indicted on eight counts of wire fraud and four counts of criminal contempt of court connected with the Lion Air case. David Lira, an attorney at the firm, and Christopher Kamon, the former head of accounting at the firm, both were also charged with eight counts of wire fraud and four counts of criminal contempt of court. Lira is married to Girardi's daughter, Jacqueline. A Chicago judge has set a trial date of May 5, 2025, in the cases against Lira and Kamon, but has not set a date for Girardi's trial. With disbarment trials also pending, a state bar judge sanctioned Lira and Kamon in January 2023, for both mishandling and for not protecting client assets.

== Disbarment and Chapter 7 bankruptcy ==
Two Chapter 7 involuntary bankruptcy petitions were filed in December 2020, and no one from the firm, including Girardi, appeared before U.S. Bankruptcy Judge Barry Russell at the first bankruptcy hearing in January 2021 to "discuss the future of his personal assets and those of his Los Angeles firm, Girardi Keese." In April 2021, it was announced that the law office will be sold. On June 1, 2022 Girardi was disbarred and ordered to pay $2,282,507 plus 10% in restitution to clients who never received settlement funds. Girardi was charged with 14 counts of violating ethics rules by the California State Bar.

A February 2023 internal investigation conducted on the State Bar of California by an outside firm found that its employees had accepted gifts, travel, meals, and other items of value from Girardi & Keese, influencing the State Bar to block complaints against the law firm. The Bar disclosed that, across four decades, during which it had received 205 complaints against Girardi, the Bar had taken no action against the attorney, and had dismissed all cases.

== Politics ==
In 2004, the firm gave $50,000 to the unsuccessful effort to defeat the 2004 California Proposition 64.

In 2008, the firm donated $225,000 in support of 2008 California Proposition 93, which was rejected by voters.

In January 2021, Girardi was removed from California Governor Gavin Newsom's Judicial Selection Advisory Committee, which vets judges for the state bench.
