= Xxpensive =

"Xxpen$ive"

Single by Erika Jayne
- Released: February 14, 2017
- Recorded: 2016
- Length: 2:44
- Label: Pretty Mess Records
- Songwriter(s): Jesse Saint John; Ferras; Sarah Hudson; Marc Sibley; Nathan Cunningham
- Producer(s): Space Primates

Erika Jayne singles chronology
"How Many Fucks" (2016)	"Xxpen$ive" (2017)	"Cars" (2018)

"Xxpensive" (stylized as "XXPEN$IVE") is a song recorded by American singer and songwriter Erika Jayne for her second studio album. Released as the album's second single, the song was first distributed digitally on February 14, 2017, accompanied by the simultaneous release of a music video.

== Background ==
The song was written by Jesse Saint John, Ferras, Sarah Hudson, Marc Sibley, and Nathan Cunningham, while Space Primates produced the song. Lyrically, "Xxpen$ive" is a tongue-in-cheek song about living a luxurious life. "I try to make records that people want to dance to and that make you want to smile. I like to escape through music," Jayne told Billboard ahead of the single release.

== Critical reception ==
After its release, "Xxpen$ive" received generally favorable reviews from contemporary music critics. Idolator's Mike Wass wrote that "the goddess of glamor unveiled the cover of her new single recently and it wouldn't look out of place on a heavy metal t-shirt circa 1987. I'm obsessed." Wass also commented on the music video by saying: "She rocks as little clothing as possible and channels '80s and '90s icons like Madonna, Pamela Anderson and Cindy Crawford." Wass compared the song to the works of Eartha Kitt and Paris Hilton. Louis Baragona of CollegeCandy.com described feeling "thrilled, overjoyed and blessed" when the song came out. Jordan Appugliesi of Mic.com called the song "smart, catchy and she has her tongue permanently in her cheek, making her more self-aware than her peers."

== Music video ==
A music video for "Xxpen$ive" was released on February 14, 2017 and directed by Mikey Minden. She has described the vibe for the music video as, "'80s Miami Scarface meets '80s Playboy meets strip clubs meets '80s Ferraris meets everything fabulous in the '80s — pink, lilac, baby blue — all of that!" Justin Moran of Out described the music video as "the gayest thing you'll watch all day". Moran stated that "Jayne's music video has the same campy over-the-top quality of Fergie's "M.I.L.F. $" or Gwen Stefani's "The Sweet Escape," as she lounges in a stylized bedroom, soaks in a dreamy bubble bath and works through slick choreo in a white pantsuit and futuristic sunnies. At this point, Ms. Jayne's message is very clear: She's ridiculously rich, absolutely untouchable and gives zero fucks about what you think."

== Usage in media ==
The song featured in the "Auto Shop" sketch with Chris Pine on the late-night show Saturday Night Live aired on May 6, 2017. In 2018, the song was featured in ShoeDazzle's "Boot Season" commercial starring Erika Jayne. The song can be heard in the German comedy film High Society (2017) and the reality TV show The Real Housewives of Beverly Hills.

== Track listing ==
Digital download
No.	Title	Length
1.	"Xxpen$ive"	2:46

== Release history ==
Country	Date	Format	Label	Ref.
Worldwide	February 14, 2017	Digital download	Pretty Mess Records	
