= Pretty Mess (album) =

Studio album by Erika Jayne
- Released: August 11, 2009
- Recorded: 2006–09
- Genre: Pop; house; EDM
- Label: E1 Entertainment

Erika Jayne chronology
Erika Jayne (2007)	Pretty Mess (2009)

Singles from Magnetized
- 1. "Roller Coaster" Released: January 1, 2007; 2. "Stars" Released: December 6, 2007; 3. "Give You Everything" Released: May 5, 2009; 4. "Pretty Mess" Released: April 27, 2010

Professional ratings
Review scores
Source	Rating
AllMusic	2/5 stars
Los Angeles Times	2/5 stars

Pretty Mess is the debut studio album by American singer and songwriter Erika Jayne. It was released on August 11, 2009 by E1 Entertainment. Four singles were released from the album, "Roller Coaster", "Stars", "Give You Everything", and "Pretty Mess". Following its release, Pretty Mess received mixed reviews from music critics.

== Background and development ==
Sheila E. is found playing percussion on the song, “Time to Realize” and the album includes a cover of Apollonia 6’s 1984 hit “Sex Shooter.” Jayne worked with several producers on the album such as Peter Rafelson, Eric Kupper, Esthero, Jahi Lake and Ike Dirty. Jayne also released a package for "Pretty Mess", featuring remixes by Dave Aude, Tracy Young, DJ Escape & Johnny Vicious, Larry Tee, Bill Hamel, Klubjumpers, Peter Rafelson and Marshall Stack, along with a music video version to the Dave Aude remix.

== Track listing ==
No.	Title	Length
1.	"Stars"	4:13
2.	"Just a Phaze"	3:51
3.	"Everybody Wants Some"	3:49
4.	"Give You Everything"	3:54
5.	"Pretty Mess"	3:43
6.	"Beautiful"	4:14
7.	"Roller Coaster"	4:06
8.	"Time to Realize"	3:13
9.	"Run Along"	3:57
10.	"Sex Shooter"	3:44
11.	"Without You"	4:18
12.	"Love Forever"	4:16
13.	"Lose Myself"	5:12
14.	"One More Time"	3:37

Additional notes

- "Sex Shooter" is a cover version performed by Apollonia 6.
