= Dorit Kemsley =

American fashion designer and television personality (born 1976)

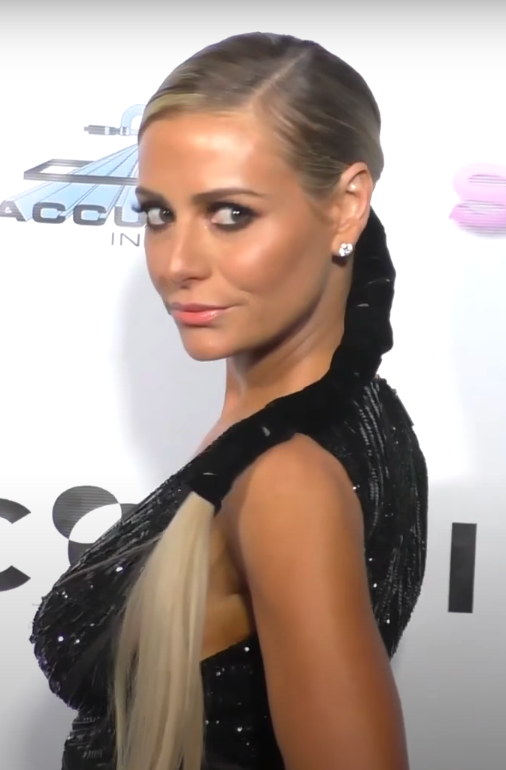
- Kemsley in 2016
- Born: Dorit Lemel; July 14, 1976 (age 50); Woodbridge, Connecticut, U.S.
- Education: Quinnipiac University (BA)
- Occupation: Fashion designer • television personality
- Years active: 2009–present
- Known for: The Real Housewives of Beverly Hills
- Spouse: Paul Kemsley (m. 2015; sep. 2024)
- Children: 2

Dorit Kemsley (née Lemel; born July 14, 1976) is an American fashion designer and television personality. She is best known as a main cast member on the reality television series The Real Housewives of Beverly Hills, appearing in that capacity since the show's seventh season in 2016.

== Early life and education ==
She was born in Woodbridge, Connecticut, to Jewish parents Shalom and Rachel (née Benchetrit) Lemel. She attended Amity Regional High School in Woodbridge, Connecticut, and graduated from Quinnipiac University with a degree in marketing, design, and communication. She then relocated to Italy to spend time at the University of Florence.

== Career ==
After spending 10 years in Italy, working in marketing and sales for a global swimwear company, Kemsley returned to America to start her own swim and resort wear collection, launching her New York City-based swimwear label, Dorit International (later Dorit Swimwear) in 2009. The line was carried at boutiques in the New York metropolitan area and Athens, Greece.

Since 2016, Kemsley has been a main cast member on the Bravo reality series,The Real Housewives of Beverly Hills, joining in the show's seventh season. In 2017, Kemsley announced the launch of her swimwear label Beverly Beach by Dorit, which debuted in October at Nordstrom's Trunk Club in Culver City, California, however officially launched in March 2018. In August 2018, the Kemsleys were sued by Ryan Horne, who claimed he lent Paul Kemsley $205,000 to front Beverly Beach, and was promised ownership of the company, but was never paid back. The parties eventually settled out of court in October of 2019.

In late 2018, the label expanded to athletic wear with Beverly Beach Body, which was sold at Kitson's, and fragrance with the 'Paradiso!' candle. In December 2019, she introduced the Beverly Beach Holiday Hair Accessory Collection. As of January 2024, Beverly Beach by Dorit is no longer active.

In November 2020, Kemsley announced she would be collaborating with Australian bridal brand Nektaria to create a line of wedding, cocktail, and evening dress. The Dorit Kemsley X Nektaria line officially launched in early 2021.

In August 2025, Kemsley announced her upcoming memoir Unburdened: Moving On, Letting Go & Putting It All on the Table; which she released on June 2, 2026.

== Personal life ==
Kemsley married English property developer Paul Kemsley on March 7, 2015, at the Rainbow Room in New York City, where singer and friend Boy George performed. Together, they have two children, Jagger and Phoenix Kemsley.

On May 9, 2024, Dorit and Paul Kemsley announced their separation after nine years of marriage. In April 2025, Kemsley filed for divorce from her husband, citing irreconcilable differences.

=== Home invasion and robbery ===
On October 27, 2021, at approximately 10:52 p.m., while Kemsley was home alone with her children, and her husband was on a business trip in London, three masked men broke into the Kemsleys' Encino home, confronted her at gun-point, and demanded she tell them where the family's valuables were. The men proceeded to ransack the home of handbags, jewelry, and watches, all of which valued at $1 million. No arrests have ever been made.

== Filmography ==
Television
Year	Title	Role	Notes
2016–present	The Real Housewives of Beverly Hills	Herself	Main Cast (Season 7–present); 194 episodes
2020	Celebrity Family Feud	Herself	Episode: "Andy Cohen vs. Real Housewives of Beverly Hills and Kevin Nealon vs. Drew Carey"
2020	Celebrity Show-Off	Herself	Contestant; Episode: "Diplo, Aim High"
2021	The Prince	Dorit Kemsley	Voice; Episode: "Beverly Hills"
