= Thomas Girardi =

American disbarred attorney (born 1939)

Tom Girardi
- Born: Thomas Vincent Girardi; June 3, 1939 (age 87); Denver, Colorado, US
- Education: Loyola Marymount University (BA, JD); New York University School of Law (LLM)
- Occupation: Lawyer
- Spouses: Karen Weitzul (m. 1964; div. 1983) Kathy Risner (m. 1993; div. 1998) Erika Girardi (m. 2000; sep. 2020)

Thomas Vincent Girardi (born June 3, 1939) is an American former attorney and co-founder of Girardi & Keese, a now-defunct downtown Los Angeles law firm.

He was disbarred in 2022 after accusations of defrauding clients. In August 2024, he was found guilty of stealing tens of millions of dollars from his clients, and was sentenced in May 2025 to an 87-month (7.25 years) prison term. He underwent another trial in 2025 in Chicago on similar charges of fraud.

He is separated from his third wife, the performer Erika Jayne, with whom he occasionally appeared on The Real Housewives of Beverly Hills in their Pasadena mansion.

== Education ==
Girardi graduated from Loyola High School in 1957. He received his undergraduate degree from Loyola Marymount University in 1961, his J.D. degree from Loyola Law School in 1964, and an LL.M. from New York University in 1965.

== Legal career ==
In 1970, Girardi became the first attorney in the state of California to win a $1 million-plus award for a medical malpractice case. Girardi has handled major cases against Boeing, Merck, Lockheed Corp (now Lockheed Martin), Pacific Gas & Electric, Los Angeles County Metropolitan Transportation Authority and Hollywood's seven major movie studios.

In the case against Pacific Gas & Electric, the utility company in 1996 agreed to pay $460 million to 650 residents of the desert community of Hinkley, California. The residents blamed incidents of cancer and other diseases on contaminated water leaked from a gas pumping station. The story of activist Erin Brockovich's work in Hinkley and the lawyers who backed her led to the 2000 film Erin Brockovich. Girardi is thanked in the credits and served as an adviser to the filmmakers.

He was the first trial lawyer to be appointed to the California Judicial Council, the policymaking body of the state courts.

Girardi was known for his work in Democratic party politics, donating millions of dollars to campaigns, playing a role in fundraising events, and giving advice to governors regarding judicial appointments. In January 2021, he was removed from California Governor Gavin Newsom's Judicial Selection Advisory Committee, which vets judges for the state bench.

=== Legal issues and disbarment ===
In December 2020, a federal judge in Chicago froze Girardi's assets, ruling that he had "misappropriated at least $2 million in client funds that were due to the families of those killed" in the Boeing 737 MAX Lion Air Flight 610 crash in Indonesia.

No one from the Girardi Keese law firm, including Girardi, appeared at the first bankruptcy hearing, in January 2021, for two Chapter 7 involuntary bankruptcy petitions filed in December 2020. The shuttered Wilshire Boulevard firm faces more than $500 million in claims as of January 2024.

In March 2021, the Los Angeles Times reported that Girardi had been sued more than 100 times. Multiple complaints had been filed against him with the State Bar of California. Nevertheless, his Bar license had remained without any attorney discipline, it was alleged, due to improper relationships between Girardi and Bar officials. Many of the Bar complaints involved alleged financial malfeasance, including allegations of theft by two dozen women who won $17 million in a lawsuit claiming that hormone replacement therapy caused their cancer along with the alleged misappropriation of millions of dollars in a burn victim lawsuit.

On March 9, 2021, the State Bar of California changed Girardi's status to "not eligible to practice law" in California. On June 1, 2022, a court ordered Girardi disbarred and to pay $2.3 million in restitution and the State Bar of California changed his status to "disbarred."

A February 2023 internal investigation conducted on the State Bar of California by an outside firm found that its employees had accepted gifts, travel, meals, and other items of value from Girardi & Keese, influencing the State Bar to block complaints against the law firm. The Bar disclosed that, across four decades, during which it had received 205 complaints against Girardi, the Bar took no action against the attorney and dismissed all cases.

Girardi was tried in August 2024, when a federal court jury determined that Girardi was guilty of wire fraud and embezzling tens of millions from his clients. He was sentenced in June 2025 to an 87-month prison term, in addition to being fined $35,000 and ordered to pay restitution of $2.3 million. On July 17, 2025, Girardi surrendered at the Metropolitan Detention Center (MDC) in Los Angeles, California to begin serving his sentence. His Bureau of Prisons Register Number is 43156-510 and his expected release date is August 1, 2031, when he turns 92 years old.

=== Awards and their revocation ===
Girardi received the “Distinguished Alumnus Award," “Champion of Justice” honor, and served on the faculty at Loyola Law School. In addition, he endowed the Thomas V. Girardi Chair in Consumer Protection Law in 2012, and supported the construction of the Albert H. Girardi Advocacy Center named in his father's honor. In the wake of Girardi's legal troubles, the school removed his father's name from the Advocacy Center and no longer funds the Girardi Chair.

In 2003, Girardi was inducted into the Trial Lawyer Hall of Fame by the State Bar of California. The International Association of Top Professionals named Girardi the “Lawyer of the Decade” for 2018.

In March 2021, the Consumer Attorneys Association of Los Angeles revoked its awards to Girardi, including the 1995 Trial Lawyer of the Year, and removed him from its hall of fame.

== Personal life ==
In August 1964, Girardi married his first wife Karen Weitzul. She filed for divorce in October 1983. Girardi married Kathy Risner in September 1993; she filed for divorce in January 1998. Kathy died in May 2018.

In January 2000, 60-year-old Girardi married his third wife, 28-year-old singer and actress Erika Jayne, who later became known as a star of the reality-television series The Real Housewives of Beverly Hills. He appeared in several episodes of the show alongside his wife. In November 2020, Erika Girardi announced the couple had separated and that she had filed for divorce.

In February 2021, Girardi was placed in a temporary conservatorship due to short-term memory loss, and in March 2021, he was diagnosed with Alzheimer's disease. His brother, Robert, a dentist, was made permanent conservator in July 2021.
