= Erika Jayne =

American singer and television personality (born 1971)

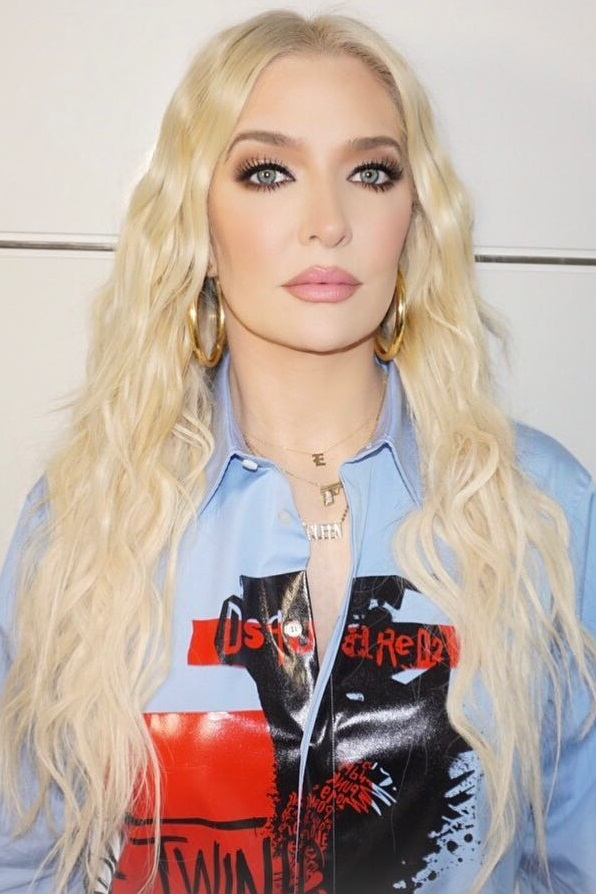
- Jayne in 2019
- Born: Erika Chahoy; July 10, 1971 (age 55); Atlanta, Georgia, U.S.
- Other name: Erika Girardi
- Occupations: Singer; television personality; actress
- Years active: 1990–present
- Spouses: Thomas Zizzo (m. 1991; div. 1996); Thomas Girardi (m. 2000; sep. 2020)
- Children: 1
- Musical career
- Genres: Dance; pop
- Instrument: Vocals
- Labels: EJ; RM; Pretty Mess

Erika Girardi (née Chahoy; born July 10, 1971), also known as Erika Jayne, is an American singer, television personality, author, and actress. Since 2015, she has appeared as a main cast member on the Bravo reality show, The Real Housewives of Beverly Hills.

== Early life ==
Erika Girardi was born in Atlanta, Georgia, on July 10, 1971, to single mother Renee Chahoy. Her father left when Erika was 9 months old. She graduated from North Atlanta High School. At 18, she moved to New York City.

== Career ==
Her first two uncredited on-screen appearances were on the first season of NBC's legal drama series Law & Order as the first murder victim Suzanne Morton in the pilot episode "Prescription for Death" and as Tim Pruiting's girlfriend in "The Violence of Summer". Girardi also had roles in independent films Alchemy (1995) and Lowball (1996).

According to her autobiography, Pretty Mess, music producer Peter Rafelson came up with the idea of adapting the stage name "Erika Jayne." Jayne's first single, "Roller Coaster" was released on January 1, 2007. The song placed at number one on the Billboard Hot Dance Club Play chart. Jayne's debut album, Pretty Mess, was released in the United States in August 2009.

In 2015, Girardi joined the cast of Bravo's reality television show The Real Housewives of Beverly Hills for the show's sixth season. The New York Times estimated that she earned more than $600,000 for the show's 11th season in 2021. In December 2016, Girardi guest starred on The Young and the Restless with her former Real Housewives cast member Eileen Davidson, who plays Ashley Abbott on the show. Girardi returned as real estate agent Farrah Dubose for one episode in 2017 and two in 2018.

In 2017, Girardi competed on season 24 of Dancing with the Stars. She and partner Gleb Savchenko were eliminated in week five. The same year, she was a red carpet host for the American Music Awards in 2017 and 2018. She also co-hosted the pre-show for the 2018 Billboard Music Awards. In 2018, Girardi competed on Lip Sync Battle, where she lost to Taye Diggs. Also in 2018, she embarked on her first headlining concert tour, Erika Jayne Presents: The Pretty Mess Tour, visiting 13 cities across the United States.

In 2019, Girardi was cast as Roxie Hart in the Broadway production of Chicago. She debuted on January 6, 2020, at the Ambassador Theater and was due to stay with the show until March 29. Due to COVID-19, production was shut down and her last performance was March 11. Jayne reprised the role of Hart at the Ambassador Theater on January 20th, 2025, for a planned three weeks, but it was extended an additional two weeks, scheduled to perform through February 23rd.

In April 2023, Girardi announced Bet It All on Blonde, a Las Vegas concert residency at the House of Blues at Mandalay Bay that ran select weekends from August to December 2023. In March 2024, Bravo aired a two-part documentary, Erika Jayne: Bet It All on Blonde, focusing on her 2023 residency at the House of Blues Music Hall in the Mandalay Bay in Las Vegas. In the documentary, she said she had contemplated suicide during the darkest days of her legal struggles. "I thought about killing myself many times," she said, adding that her son talked her out of it.

In 2025, Jayne competed in season thirteen of The Masked Singer as "Yorkie". She was eliminated in the "Group C Finals: Decades Night".

In 2026, Jayne was announced as one of the opening acts for Kesha's Freedom Tour. This marked Jayne's second appearance on a Kesha tour, having previously made a brief cameo during the Scissor Sisters' performance of "Let's Have a Kiki" at the Inglewood, California, date of Kesha and the Scissor Sisters' co-headlining Tits Out Tour.

== Personal life and legal issues ==
While living in New York, Girardi met Thomas Zizzo, who was working as a DJ at a club in Manhattan. The couple married in December 1991 at St. Patrick's Cathedral. Soon thereafter she gave birth to her son, Thomas Zizzo Jr. He is a police officer in Los Angeles. After the couple divorced in 1996, Girardi moved to Los Angeles to pursue her dream of becoming a singer.

In January 2000, Erika married Los Angeles personal-injury attorney Thomas Girardi, who was 32 years older than her and was already twice divorced. They met in 1998 when she was working as a cocktail waitress at Chasen's, a Los Angeles restaurant where he was a regular. He was known for helping win the trial that made Erin Brockovich into a household name.

In November 2020, Erika announced her separation from Girardi and filed for divorce. One month after the divorce announcement, the couple were named in a lawsuit for allegedly embezzling funds meant for families of the victims of the fatal 2018 Lion Air plane crash. Media outlets reported that the divorce could be a "sham" to hide assets. In December 2020, a Chicago-based law firm asked a federal judge to order Jayne to stop selling designer clothing online amid an effort to recover $2 million in money owed to clients.

On December 17, 2020, a Los Angeles Times article alleged that Tom Girardi "stole millions of dollars from vulnerable clients", and improperly funneled more than $20 million of victims' compensation to EJ Global, a company set up to finance Jayne's entertainment and singing career. A documentary about the couple's highly publicized legal troubles titled The Housewife and the Hustler was released on Hulu on June 14, 2021. A sequel, The Housewife and the Hustler 2: The Reckoning, featuring Jayne meeting with victims of Girardi's, was released in February 2024. On August 31, 2022, a judge ruled in a $5 million civil fraud lawsuit that the plaintiffs could not prove Jayne had knowledge of or involvement in the alleged fraud. In August 2024, a federal court jury found Tom Girardi guilty of four counts of wire fraud. He was sentenced in June 2025 to an 87-month prison term, his expected release date is August 1, 2031, when he turns 92 years old.

== Discography ==
Studio albums
Title	Album details
Pretty Mess	Released: August 11, 2009; Label: E1 Entertainment; Format: CD, digital download

=== Singles ===
As lead artist
Year	Title	Peaks			Album	Ref.
Year	Title	US Dance Club	US Dance/ Elec.	US Global Dance	Album	Ref.
2007	"Roller Coaster"	1	—	—	Pretty Mess	
2007	"Stars"	1	—	33	Pretty Mess	
2009	"Give You Everything"	1	—	16	Pretty Mess	
2010	"Pretty Mess"	1	—	19	Pretty Mess	
2010	"One Hot Pleasure"	1	—	24	Non-album singles	
2011	"Party People (Ignite the World)"	1	—	25	Non-album singles	
2013	"Get It Tonight" (featuring Flo Rida)	—	20	—	Non-album singles	
2014	"Painkillr"	1	25	—	Non-album singles	
2014	"You Make Me Wanna Dance"	—	—	—	Non-album singles	
2015	"Crazy" (featuring Maino)	1	—	—	Non-album singles	
2016	"How Many Fucks"	1	—	—	Non-album singles	
2017	"Xxpensive"	—	—	—	Non-album singles	
2018	"Cars"	—	—	—	Non-album singles	
2023	"Drip Drop"	—	—	—	Non-album singles	
2024	"Bounce"	—	—	—	Non-album singles	
2024	"Dominos"	—	—	—	Non-album singles	
"—" denotes a title that did not appear on the respective chart.

As featured artist
Year	Title	Album	Ref.
2019	"Drip" (Brooke Candy)	Sexorcism	

== Filmography ==
=== Film ===
Year	Title	Role	Notes
1992	Fly By Night	Debbie	
1995	Alchemy	Kitty	
1996	Lowball	Kate	
2016	Sharknado: The 4th Awakens	Tech Frances	

=== Television ===
Year	Title	Role	Notes
1990	Law & Order	Suzanne Morton	Episode: "Prescription for Death"
2016–present	The Real Housewives of Beverly Hills	Herself	Main Cast: 199 episodes
2017	Dancing with the Stars	Herself	Contestant (season 24, eliminated episode 5)
2018	Lip Sync Battle	Herself	Episode: "Christina Aguilera Tribute, Taye Diggs vs Erika Jayne"
2024	Erika Jayne: Bet It All on Blonde	Herself	Main cast: 2 episodes
2025	Denise Richards & Her Wild Things	Herself	2 episodes
2025	The Masked Singer	Herself/Yorkie	Season 13 contestant
2026	The Real Housewives Ultimate Girls Trip: Roaring 20th	Herself	Episode: "Roaring 20th: White Lies"
