= Billboard Top Folk Records of 1948 =

American music chart

The Billboard Top Folk Records of 1948 is a year-end chart compiled Billboard magazine ranking the year's top folk records based on record sales. In 1948, country music records were included on, and dominated, the Billboard folk records chart.

Eddy Arnold led all other artists with nine records on the year-end folk chart. The four top records were all by Arnold: (1) "Bouquet of Roses" with 279 points; (2) "Anytime" with 185 points; (3) "Just a Little Lovin' (Will Go a Long Way)" with 145 points; and (4) "Texarkana Baby" with 134 points.

The best selling records by artists other than Arnold were "One Has My Name (The Other Has My Heart)" by Jimmy Wakely (106 points) and "Humpty Dumpty Heart" by Hank Thompson (105 points).

Sales year-end	Peak (Note: This column recites the record's peak position on Billboard's weekly charts.)	Title	Artist(s)	Label
1		"Bouquet of Roses"	Eddy Arnold	RCA Victor
2		"Anytime"	Eddy Arnold	RCA Victor
3		"Just a Little Lovin' (Will Go a Long Way)"	Eddy Arnold	RCA Victor
4		"Texarkana Baby"	Eddy Arnold	RCA Victor
5		"One Has My Name (The Other Has My Heart)"	Jimmy Wakely	Capitol
6		"Humpty Dumpty Heart"	Hank Thompson	Capitol
7		"Life Gets Tee-Jus Don't It"	Carson Robison	Capitol
8		"Sweeter Than the Flowers	Moon Mullican	King
9		"Deck of Cards"	T. Texas Tyler	4 Star
10		"My Daddy Is Only a Picture"	Eddy Arnold	RCA Victor
11		"Tennessee Waltz"	Pee Wee King	RCA Victor
12		"Suspicion"	Tex Williams	Capitol
13		"Tennessee Saturday Night"	Red Foley	Decca
14		"Tennessee Waltz"	Cowboy Copas	King
15		"I Love You So Much It Hurts"	Jimmy Wakely	Capitol
16		"Seaman's Blues"	Ernest Tubb	Decca
17		"I'll Hold You in My Heart (Till I Can Hold You in My Arms)"	Eddy Arnold	RCA Victor
17		"A Heart Full of Love (For a Handful of Kisses)"	Eddy Arnold	RCA Victor
19		"Rock and Rye"	Tex Ritter	Capitol
20		"Forever Is Ending Today"	Ernest Tubb	Decca
21		"Blue Shadows on the Trail"	Roy Rogers-Sons of the Pioneers	RCA Victor
21		"Cool Water"	Sons of the Pioneers	RCA Victor
23		"I Love You So Much It Hurts"	Floyd Tillman	Columbia
24		"Then I Turned and Walked Slowly Away	Eddy Arnold	RCA Victor
25		"Who? Me?"	Tex Williams	Capitol
26		"What a Fool I Was"	Eddy Arnold	RCA Victor
27		"Tennessee Moon"	Cowboy Copas	King
28		"Buttons and Bows"	Gene Autry	Columbia

== See also ==
- Billboard year-end top singles of 1948
- 1948 in country music
