= 1948 in country music =

This is a list of notable events in country music that took place in 1948.

== Events ==
- April 3 – Radio station KWKH of Shreveport, Louisiana airs the Louisiana Hayride for the first time.
- May 15 – Billboard begins a sales-based Best Selling Folk Retail Records chart, the magazine's second chart to track the popularity of country songs. The new chart complements the existing Most Played Juke Box Folk Records chart, and begins a practice of multiple charts (and possible simultaneous No. 1 songs) that will continue for the next 10 years.
- July 24 – Roy Acuff announces his intention to run for governor of Tennessee. Running as the Republican candidate, he will lose to Democratic candidate Gordon Browning in the November election.

=== No dates ===
- Eddy Arnold dominates the Billboard charts, scoring five No. 1 songs (six, if one counts Arnold's "I'll Hold You in My Heart (Till I Can Hold You in My Arms)", which had been No. 1 since November 1947). Only Jimmy Wakely's "One Has My Name (The Other Has My Heart)" breaks Arnold's streak. Four other songs by Arnold also make the country charts.

== Top hits of the year ==
=== Number one hits ===
(As certified by Billboard magazine)

| US | Single | Artist |
|---|---|---|
| April 8 | "Anytime" | Eddy Arnold |
| June 5 | "Bouquet of Roses" | Eddy Arnold |
| June 5 | "Texarkana Baby" | Eddy Arnold |
| September 18 | "Just a Little Lovin' (Will Go a Long Way)" | Eddy Arnold |
| November 13 | "One Has My Name (The Other Has My Heart)" | Jimmy Wakely |
| December 25 | "A Heart Full of Love (For a Handful of Kisses)" | Eddy Arnold |

=== Top Hillbilly (Country) Recordings 1948 ===
1948 was the year Eddy Arnold and Country music crossed over to the Billboard magazine mainstream popular charts. Nine of the top ten Country records entered the popular charts, with "Bouquet of Roses" spending 28 weeks, in addition to a record 54 weeks on the Country charts.

The 1948 year-end Country rankings include 'Most-Played Juke Box Folk Records' and 'Best Selling Retail Folk Records' (starting May 15, 1948). With few exceptions, records included entered the charts between November 1947 and December 1948, and received points for their full chart runs. Each week, a score of 15 points is assigned for the no. 1 record, 9 points for no. 2, 8 points for no. 3, and so on, and the total of all weeks from both charts determined the final rank. Number of weeks at number one or total weeks on the chart do not include duplicates; if a record was #1 on both charts on July 15, that counts as one week, not two. Additional information from other sources is reported, but not used for ranking. This includes dates from the "Discography of American Historical Recordings" website, cross-over information from R&B and Pop charts, 'Cashbox', and other sources as noted.

| Rank | Artist | Title | Label | Recorded | Released | Chart Positions |
|---|---|---|---|---|---|---|
| 1 | Eddy Arnold and his Tennessee Plowboys | "Bouquet of Roses" | RCA Victor 20-2806 | May 18, 1947 | April 5, 1948 | US Billboard 1948 #99, US #13 for 2 weeks, 28 total weeks, US Hillbilly 1948 #1, USHB #1 for 19 weeks, 54 total weeks, 980 points |
| 2 | Jimmy Wakely | "One Has My Name (The Other Has My Heart)" | Capitol 15162 | July 5, 1948 | September 6, 1948 | US Billboard 1948 #81, US #10 for 1 weeks, 8 total weeks, US Hillbilly 1948 #2, USHB #1 for 11 weeks, 32 total weeks, 562 points |
| 3 | Eddy Arnold and his Tennessee Plowboys | "Anytime" | RCA Victor 20-2700 | August 20, 1947 | February 12, 1948 | US Billboard 1948 #136, US #17 for 1 weeks, 1 total weeks, US Hillbilly 1948 #3, USHB #1 for 9 weeks, 39 total weeks, 546 points |
| 4 | Eddy Arnold and his Tennessee Plowboys | "Just a Little Lovin' (Will Go a Long Way)" | RCA Victor 20-3013 | December 17, 1947 | July 29, 1948 | US Billboard 1948 #103, US #13 for 1 week, 9 total weeks, US Hillbilly 1948 #4, USHB #1 for 8 weeks, 32 total weeks, 431 points |
| 5 | Hank Thompson and His Brazos Valley Boys | "Humpty Dumpty Heart" | Capitol Americana 40065 | October 10, 1947 | November 20, 1947 | US Hillbilly 1948 #5, USHB #2 for 2 weeks, 38 total weeks, 327 points |
| 6 | Eddy Arnold and his Tennessee Plowboys | "Texarkana Baby" | RCA Victor 20-2806 | August 20, 1947 | April 5, 1948 | US Billboard 1948 #144, US #18 for 1 week, 1 total weeks, US Hillbilly 1948 #6, USHB #1 for 3 weeks, 26 total weeks, 316 points |
| 7 | Pee Wee King and His Golden West Cowboys | "Tennessee Waltz" | RCA Victor 20-2680 | December 2, 1947 | January 25, 1948 | US Billboard 1948 #349, US #30 for 1 weeks, 1 total weeks, US Hillbilly 1948 #7, USHB #3 for 2 weeks, 35 total weeks, 272 points |
| 8 | Eddy Arnold and his Tennessee Plowboys | "A Heart Full of Love (For a Handful of Kisses)" | RCA Victor 20-3174 | December 17, 1947 | October 12, 1948 | US Billboard 1948 #243, US #23 for 1 week, 2 total weeks, US Hillbilly 1948 #8, USHB #1 for 1 week, 21 total weeks, 248 points |
| 9 | Carson Robison with His Pleasant Valley Boys | "Life Gets Tee-Jus Don't It" | MGM 10224 | October 2, 1947 | August 1948 | US Billboard 1948 #112, US #14 for 1 week, 9 total weeks, US Hillbilly 1948 #9, USHB #3 for 2 week, 28 total weeks, 176 points |
| 10 | Eddy Arnold, The Tennessee Plowboy and His Guitar | "Then I Turned and Walked Slowly Away" | RCA Victor 20-3174 | August 20, 1947 | October 12, 1948 | US Billboard 1949 #305, US #29 for 1 week, 1 total weeks, US Hillbilly 1948 #10, USHB #2 for 1 week, 17 total weeks, 160 points |
| 11 | Moon Mullican | "Sweeter Than The Flowers" | King 673 | September 17, 1948 | October 9, 1948 | US Hillbilly 1948 #11, USHB #3 for 1 weeks, 26 total weeks, 158 points |
| 12 | Eddy Arnold and his Tennessee Plowboys | "What A Fool I Was" | RCA Victor 20-2700 | May 18, 1947 | February 12, 1948 | US Billboard 1948 #338, US #29 for 1 week, 1 total weeks, US Hillbilly 1948 #12, USHB #2 for 4 weeks, 29 total weeks, 130 points |
| 13 | Cowboy Copas | "Signed Sealed and Delivered" | King 658 | April 5, 1948 | August 1948 | US Hillbilly 1948 #13, USHB #2 for 3 weeks, 20 total weeks, 111 points |
| 14 | T. Texas Tyler | "Deck of Cards" | 4 Star 1228 | January 1948 | February 1948 | US Billboard 1948 #198, US #21 for 1 week, 2 total weeks, US Hillbilly 1948 #14, USHB #2 for 1 weeks, 13 total weeks, 96 points |
| 15 | Tex Williams and His Western Caravan | "Suspicion" | Capitol 40109 | December 16, 1947 | April 1948 | US Billboard 1948 #287, US #24 for 1 week, 1 total weeks, US Hillbilly 1948 #15, USHB #4 for 1 weeks, 12 total weeks, 83 points |
| 16 | Bob Wills and His Texas Playboys | "Bubbles in My Beer" | MGM 10116 | January 24, 1945 | March 12, 1948 | US Hillbilly 1948 #16, USHB #3 for 8 weeks, 24 total weeks, 81 points |
| 17 | Tex Williams and His Western Caravan | "Don't Telephone - Don't Telegraph (Tell A Woman)" | Capitol Americana 40081 | September 8, 1947 | January 18, 1948 | US Billboard 1948 #330, US #27 for 1 weeks, 1 total weeks, US Hillbilly 1948 #17, USHB #1 for 3 weeks, 15 total weeks, 71 points |
| 18 | Eddy Arnold and his Tennessee Plowboys | "My Daddy is Only a Picture" | RCA Victor 20-3013 | August 20, 1947 | August 1948 | US Hillbilly 1948 #18, USHB #2 for 4 weeks, 29 total weeks, 68 points |
| 19 | Cowboy Copas | "Tennessee Waltz" | King 696 | April 5, 1948 | August 1948 | US Hillbilly 1948 #19, USHB #1 for 5 weeks, 15 total weeks, 64 points |
| 20 | Floyd Tillman | "I Love You So Much It Hurts" | Columbia 20430 | December 29, 1947 | June 8, 1948 | US Hillbilly 1948 #20, USHB #2 for 4 weeks, 14 total weeks, 51 points |
| 21 | Tex Williams and His Western Caravan | "Banjo Polka" | Capitol 15101 | October 28, 1946 | May 25, 1948 | US Hillbilly 1948 #21, USHB #5 for 1 week, 14 total weeks, 47 points |
| 22 | Ernest Tubb | "Forever Is Ending Today'" | Decca 46134 | January 13, 1944 | June 6, 1948 | US Hillbilly 1948 #22, USHB #3 for 2 weeks, 16 total weeks, 42 points |
| 23 | Ernest Tubb | "Seaman's Blues'" | Decca 46119 | January 13, 1944 | June 6, 1948 | US Hillbilly 1948 #23, USHB #3 for 2 weeks, 16 total weeks, 39 points |
| 24 | Gene Autry | "Here Comes Santa Claus (Right Down Santa Claus Lane)" | Columbia 20377 | August 28, 1947 | May 1, 1948 | US Billboard 1948 #56, US #8 for 1 week, 5 total weeks, US Hillbilly 1948 #24, USHB #1 for 1 weeks, 12 total weeks, 35 points |
| 30 | Gene Autry | "Buttons and Bows" | Columbia 37942 | August 28, 1947 | May 1, 1948 | US Billboard 1948 #134, US #17 for 1 week, 3 total weeks, US Hillbilly 1948 #30, USHB #1 for 1 weeks, 12 total weeks, 17 points |
| 41 | Hank Williams with His Drifting Cowboys | "I'm a Long Gone Daddy" | MGM 10401 | November 6, 1947 | June 18, 1948 | US Hillbilly 1949 #41, USHB #2 for 2 weeks, 29 total weeks, 5 points |

== Births ==
- January 28 – Hasse Andersson, Swedish country musician.
- February 8 – Dan Seals, singer-songwriter who successfully turned from pop music to country during the 1980s (died 2009).
- March 23 – David Olney, American singer-songwriter (died 2020).
- April 21 – Paul Davis, pop-styled singer-songwriter who had several hits during the 1980s (died 2008).
- May 2 – Larry Gatlin, singer-songwriter who enjoyed mainstream success in the 1970s and 1980s.
- May 4 – Tim DuBois, music executive.
- May 18 – Joe Bonsall, member of the country-gospel group The Oak Ridge Boys (he's the first tenor) (died 2024).
- June 3 – Fred LaBour, also known as Too Slim, member of Riders in the Sky.
- June 8 – Mats Rådberg, Swedish country musician. (died 2020).
- September 26 – Olivia Newton-John, Australian-born pop vocalist who enjoyed major crossover success in country during the mid-1970s.
- October 2 – Chris LeDoux, world champion bareback rider who sang about the rodeo circuit and cowboy life (died 2005).
- November 6 – Glenn Frey, one of the founding members of country-rock band Eagles (died 2016).
- December 7 – Gary Morris, country-pop singer of the 1980s.
- December 25 – Barbara Mandrell, country-pop singer and multi-instrumentalist of the 1970s and 1980s; host of own television series.
- December 27 – Les Taylor, member of the 1980s group Exile.

== Deaths ==
- January 15 – Jack Guthrie, 32, folk-styled country singer best known for "Oklahoma Hills" (tuberculosis).
- September 15 – Vernon Dalhart, 65, pioneering influence of the 1920s.
