= Traveller (1997 film) =

- Theatrical release poster
- Directed by: Jack N. Green
- Written by: Jim McGlynn
- Produced by: David Blocker; Mickey Liddell; Bill Paxton; Brian Swardstrom
- Starring: Bill Paxton; Mark Wahlberg; Julianna Margulies; James Gammon; Luke Askew
- Cinematography: Jack N. Green
- Edited by: Michael Ruscio
- Music by: Andy Paley
- Production company: Banner Entertainment
- Distributed by: October Films
- Release dates: March 8, 1997 (SXSW); April 18, 1997 (United States)
- Running time: 101 minutes
- Country: United States
- Language: English
- Box office: $534,010

Traveller is a 1997 American independent Southern Gothic crime comedy film directed by Jack N. Green in his directorial debut and written by Jim McGlynn.

The film stars Bill Paxton, Mark Wahlberg, Julianna Margulies, James Gammon, and Luke Askew. The story follows a man and a group of nomadic con artists in North Carolina. The film premiered at the South by Southwest Film Festival on March 8, 1997 and received a limited release on April 18, 1997.

== Plot Summary ==
The Travellers are a close-knit group of Irish American con artists who travel the American South looking for easy marks. Pat O'Hara, a city-bred young man whose father was a member of the group and has since died, returns home for his father’s funeral and wants to join the group. However, Pat is not welcomed due to his father breaking the group’s code for marrying outside of the clan. While Boss Jack, the group's head, shuns Pat, Bokky, the group’s "star artist", takes Pat under his wing and teaches him the tricks of the trade.

Bokky and Pat decide to run a complicated scam on Jean, a bartender and single mother they meet on the road. The two men also hook up with Double D, a fellow grifter. Bokky becomes romantically drawn to Jean, and feeling remorse for having deceived her, considers violating the group’s principles by returning her money. Other tensions are spurred by Pat’s romantic interest in Boss Jack’s daughter Kate and his plans with Double D to outsmart a group of mobsters.

== Cast ==
- Bill Paxton as Bokky
- Mark Wahlberg as Pat O'Hara
- Julianna Margulies as Jean
- James Gammon as "Double D"
- Luke Askew as Boss Jack Costello
- Danielle Keaton as Shane
- Nikki DeLoach as Kate
- Michael Shaner as "Lip"
- Vincent Chase as "Bimbo"
- Rance Howard as Farmer
- Jean Speegle Howard as Bokky's Grandmother
- Andrew Porter as Pincher
- Robert Peters as Farmer's Son
- Jo Ann Pflug as Boss Jack's Wife

== Production ==
The film's title refers to Irish Travellers, a nomadic group originating in Ireland whom the film's clan claim as ancestors. Jim McGlynn wrote the original script at the suggestion of his friend, who claimed to have to have gotten drunk with real-life Travellers in an Ohio bar. The script won McGlynn the Nichol Fellowship.

Bill Paxton came across McGlynn's script in 1993, commenting it reminded him of "movies from the '60s and '70s, like Five Easy Pieces and Paper Moon. I grew up on films like Arthur Penn's Bonnie and Clyde, Peter Bogdanovich's Last Picture Show and Hal Ashby's Bound For Glory. They had this feeling of gritty Americana. That’s the tradition I saw Traveller falling into." Paxton paid filmmaker Rick King, who held an option on the screenplay, so that he could produce the film himself with Jack N. Green as the director.

The film was the directorial debut of Green, the longtime cinematographer for Clint Eastwood. The film includes a reference to the Eastwood film Every Which Way but Loose, which plays on a TV screen in one scene.

== Soundtrack ==
Traveller: Music from the Motion Picture

Soundtrack album to the film Traveller by Various artists
- Released: April 22, 1997
- Genres: country; R&B; folk; Memphis soul
- Length: 50:52
- Label: Elektra/Asylum Records

As a producer for the film, Bill Paxton supervised the film's soundtrack, which was released on April 22, 1997. Among the artists who contributed cover versions of classic country songs were k.d. lang, Jimmie Dale Gilmore, the Cox Family, Bryan White, Lou Ann Barton, and Randy Travis.

No.	Title	Length
1.	"King of the Road" (Randy Travis)	3:29
2.	"Dream Lover" (Mandy Barnett)	2:20
3.	"If You've Got the Money (I've Got the Time)" (Jimmie Dale Gilmore)	2:41
4.	"Seven Lonely Days" (k.d. lang and the Reclines, Take 6)	2:41
5.	"Rockin' Robin'" (Bryan White)	2:38
6.	"Please Help Me, I'm Falling" (Lila McCann)	2:11
7.	"Blues Stay Away from Me" (Thrasher Shiver)	3:14
8.	"Sweet Nothin's" (Tina & the B-Side Movement)	2:23
9.	"I Love You a Thousand Ways" (Jimmie Dale Gilmore)	2:44
10.	"Searching (For Someone Like You)" (Mandy Barnett)	2:08
11.	"Gonna Find Me a Bluebird" (Royal Wade Kimes)	2:33
12.	"I'm Thinking Tonight of My Blue Eyes" (The Cox Family)	3:00
13.	"Love and Happiness" (Al Green)	5:04
14.	"Te-Ni-Nee-Ni-Nu" (Lou Ann Barton)	3:06
15.	"Sweeter Than the Flowers" (The Cox Family)	2:30
16.	"Don't Rob Another Man's Castle" (Royal Wade Kimes)	2:16
17.	"Dark Moon" (Mandy Barnett)	2:50
18.	"Young Love" (Kevin Sharp)	3:04
Total length:		50:52

== Reception ==
The film received positive reviews from critics. Review aggregation website Rotten Tomatoes gives the film a score of 78% based on reviews from 27 critics, with an average rating of 6.4/10. The site’s critics consensus states, "Though it may not explore its core issues as deeply as some may like, Traveller is nevertheless a smart and funny portrait of a relatively unfamiliar subculture with some strong performances." Metacritic assigned the film a weighted average score of 57 out of 100 based on 20 critics, indicating "mixed or average reviews".

Janet Maslin of The New York Times commented "No frills, no noir, no quirks, no smoldering subtext, no dysfunction: Traveler is just a hot little sleeper with strong characters and a story to tell." Roger Ebert gave the film 3 out of 4 stars and opined, "The screenplay by Jim McGlynn, which plays a little like something Eastwood might have made, is subtle and observant; there aren't big plot points, but lots of little ones, and the plot allows us the delight of figuring out the scams." Emanuel Levy of Variety wrote, "Paxton, who recently appeared in such blockbusters as Apollo 13 and Twister, is back on indie terra firma in a rich character role that’s not only charismatic but holds the picture together. The older members of the cast, particularly Askew and Gammon, shine throughout. The only weak performance comes from Wahlberg, whose stiff acting and monotonous delivery undercut the complexity of his central role. The film’s real discovery is the beautiful Margulies…who displays the looks and stature of a future bigscreen leading lady." Jon Matsumoto of Box Office said the film "offers a fun, escapist ride when it allows moviegoers the thrill of taking part in the clever trickery, but it's even better when it explores the intense loyalty and Irish-based customs of these masterful thieves."

Criticisms focused on the film's tonal imbalances and the violence of its ending. Marjorie Baumgarten of The Austin Chronicle wrote, "Essentially an adventure-comedy about a group of grifters, Traveller adds on this charming, although rather implausible, romance plot, as well as an action-thriller, one-last-big-score, ultra-violent climax. The merger creates an unsteady tone as the movie moves from scene to scene, while the script emphasizes the bizarre strictures and customs of the Travellers without ever really bringing the subculture into sharp focus." However, she praised the ensemble cast and character-driven moments, concluding, "Traveller has the kind of warmth and spirit that overrides any of its structural flaws. The excursion is well worth the fare."

== Home media ==
The film was released on DVD on July 25, 2000. The film was released as part of a Blu-ray Disc double feature with Telling Lies in America from Shout! Factory on May 29, 2012.
