= Barry Young =

Barry Young may refer to:

- Barry Young (cricketer) (born 1975), English cricketer
- Barry Young (footballer) (born 1970), Australian rules footballer
- Barry Young (musician) (1931–1966), American pop singer
- Wolfgang (wrestler) (born 1986), English professional wrestler born Barry Young
