= Gebbia =

Gebbia is a surname. Notable people with the surname include:

- Carlton Gebbia (born 1973), British actress and television personality
- Joe Gebbia (born 1981), American designer and Internet entrepreneur
- Megan Gebbia (born 1973), American basketball coach and player
- Tristan Gebbia (born 1998), American football player
