= Brooks Nader =

American model (born 1997)

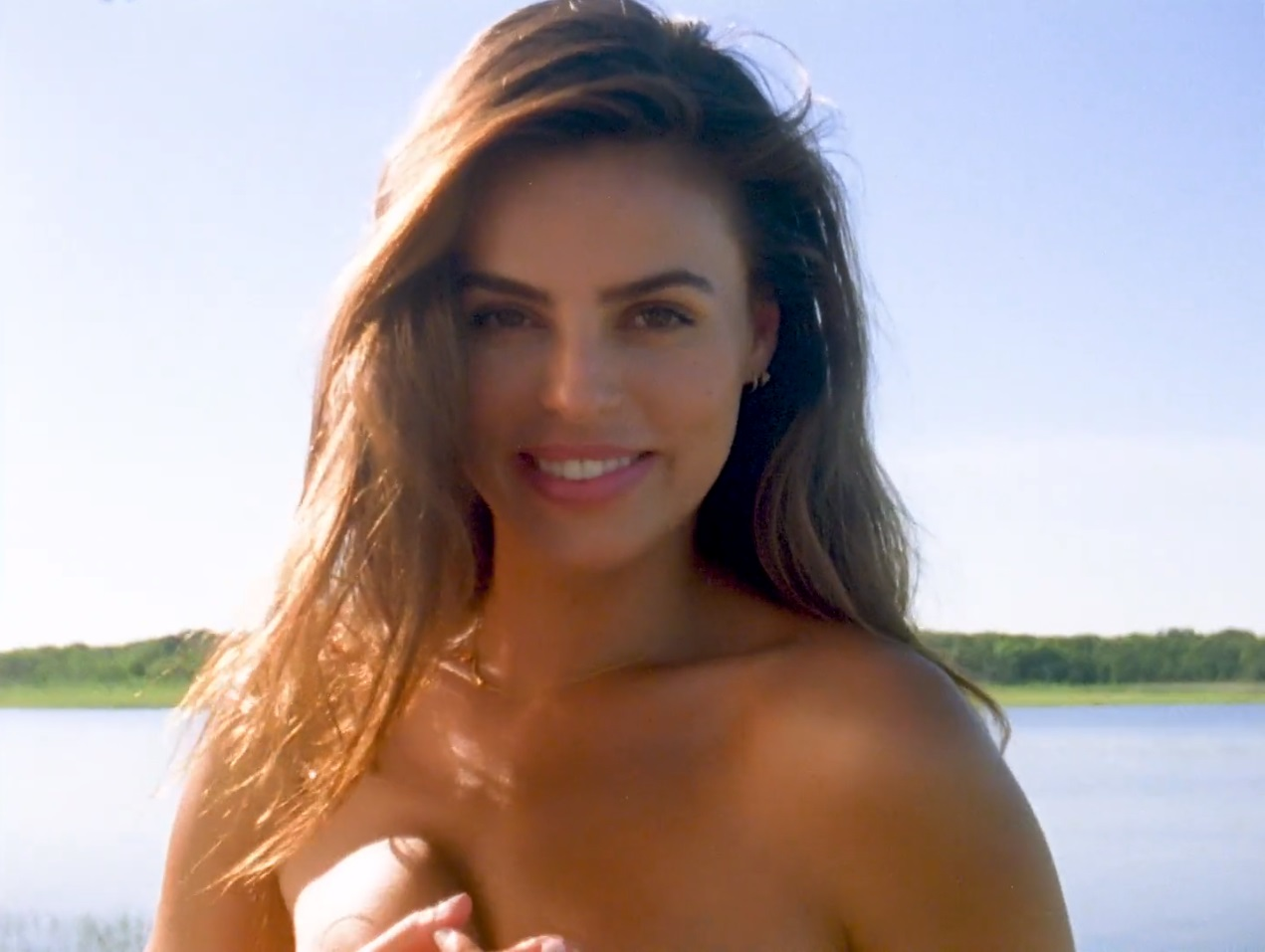
- Nader in 2019
- Born: Brooks Claire Nader; February 7, 1997 (age 29); Baton Rouge, Louisiana, U.S.
- Education: Tulane University
- Occupations: Model; television personality
- Years active: 2018–present
- Spouse: Billy Haire (m. 2019; div. 2025)
- Modeling information
- Hair color: Brown
- Eye color: Brown

Brooks Claire Nader (born February 7, 1997) is an American model and television personality. She became a model for Sports Illustrated Swimsuit Issue after winning the 2019 Swim Search, and was featured in the magazine in 2020, 2021, and 2022. In 2023, Nader became a covergirl for the magazine. In 2024, she competed on the 33rd season of Dancing with the Stars. She stars along with her sisters in their reality show Love Thy Nader and Fox's upcoming 2027 reboot of Baywatch.

== Early life ==
Nader was born and raised in Baton Rouge, Louisiana. She is the oldest of the four daughters of Breaux Gardner Nader, a senior financial advisor at Wells Fargo Advisors, and his wife Holland Pryor Greene. Her grandfather Sam Nader, is the assistant athletic director for football of the LSU Tigers. She is of partial Lebanese descent. Nader graduated from Episcopal School of Baton Rouge in 2015 and went on to attend Tulane University.

== Career ==
In 2018, Nader had a minor role as Orderly Lisa in the action crime film Backtrace.

In 2019, Nader won the 2019 Swim Search open casting call to be photographed as a model for Sports Illustrated Swimsuit Issue, beating 10,000 applicants. Since then, she was featured in the magazine again in 2020, 2021, and 2022 and walked in fashion shows during Miami Swim Week. In 2023, she became a covergirl for the magazine, appearing alongside Kim Petras, Megan Fox, and Martha Stewart. She was photographed by James Macari in the Dominican Republic for the cover. Nader is the second Swim Search alumna to appear on the cover of Sports Illustrated Swimsuit Issue, after Camille Kostek in 2019.

She launched a jewelry collection with the brand Electric Picks. She created an interior design and home decor brand called Home by BN.

=== Dancing with the Stars ===
In September 2024, Nader was announced as one of the celebrities competing on season 33 of Dancing with the Stars. She was partnered with Gleb Savchenko and they finished in 9th place.

Week	Dance	Music	Judges' scores (Note: Individual judges' scores are listed in the following order: Carrie Ann Inaba, Derek Hough, Bruno Tonioli.)			Total score	Result
1	Tango	"Piece of Me"—Britney Spears	6	6	6	18	No elimination
2	Quickstep	"9 to 5"—Dolly Parton	7	6	7	20	Safe
3 (Night 1)	Rumba	"Sexual Healing"—Marvin Gaye	7	7^{1} / 7	7	28	No elimination
3 (Night 2)	Cha-cha-cha	"Nothin' But a Good Time"—Poison	8	8 / 9^{2}	8	33	Safe
4	Salsa	"Mi Gente"—J Balvin and Willy William	8	8 / 8^{3}	8	32	Eliminated

Notes

^{1} Score awarded by guest judge Rosie Perez.
^{2} Score awarded by guest judge Gene Simmons.
^{3} Score awarded by guest judge Mark Ballas.

== Personal life ==
Nader was married to Billy Haire, an advertising executive, and lived with him in New York City. She and Haire separated after three years of marriage in 2022. In 2024, it was reported that she was in a relationship with Prince Constantine-Alexios of Greece and Denmark. Their relationship ended in the summer of 2024. She briefly dated her professional dance partner, Gleb Savchenko, from late-2024 before splitting in 2025.

== Filmography ==
Film and television
Year	Title	Role	Notes	Ref.
2018	Backtrace	Orderly Lisa	Film (also known as Amnesia)	
2024	Dancing with the Stars	Herself	Contestant on season 33	
2024	Good Morning America	Herself	Dax Shepard/Cast of "Dancing with the Stars"	
2025–present	Love Thy Nader	Herself	Reality Series; Hulu, Freeform	
