= Jo Stafford on Capitol =

Compilation album by Jo Stafford
- Released: June 12, 2001
- Genre: Traditional pop
- Label: Collectors' Choice

Professional ratings
Review scores
Source	Rating
Allmusic	4/5 stars

Jo Stafford on Capitol is a 2001 compilation album of songs recorded by American singer Jo Stafford. It was released on the Collectors' Choice label on June 12, 2001.

== Track listing ==
1. Someone to Love
2. Georgia on My Mind
3. I Didn't Mean a Word I Said
4. Fools Rush In
5. September Song
6. Sonata
7. That's Where I Came In
8. Passing By
9. Love and the Weather
10. I'm My Own Grandmaw
11. Better Luck Next Time
12. Every Day I Love You (Just a Little Bit More)
13. Suspicion
14. Trouble in Mind
15. It Was Written in the Stars
16. By the Way
17. Here I'll Stay
18. Begin the Beguine
19. Just Reminiscin'
20. I'm Gonna Wash That Man Right Outa My Hair
21. Smiles
22. (Just One Way to Say) I Love You
23. Homework
24. Ask Me No Questions
