= The Real Housewives of Beverly Hills season 4 =

The Real Housewives of Beverly Hills
- Season 4
- Cover used by iTunes (Left to right) Kim and Kyle Richards, Giraud, Hadid, Glanville, Gebbia and Vanderpump
- Starring: Kim Richards; Kyle Richards; Lisa Vanderpump; Brandi Glanville; Yolanda Hadid; Carlton Gebbia; Joyce Giraud
- No. of episodes: 23

Release
- Original network: Bravo
- Original release: November 4, 2013 – April 7, 2014

Season chronology
- ← Previous; Season 3 Next → Season 5

The fourth season of The Real Housewives of Beverly Hills, an American reality television series, aired on Bravo from November 4, 2013, to April 7, 2014, and is primarily filmed in Beverly Hills, California.

The season focuses on the personal and professional lives of Kim Richards, Kyle Richards, Lisa Vanderpump, Brandi Glanville, Yolanda Hadid, Carlton Gebbia and Joyce Giraud. The season consisted of 23 episodes.

This season marked the only appearances for both Carlton Gebbia and Joyce Giraud.

The season's executive producers are Andrew Hoegl, Barrie Bernstein, Lisa Shannon, Pam Healy and Andy Cohen.

== Production and crew ==
The Real Housewives of Beverly Hills was officially renewed for a fourth season in June 2013, with the full cast, premiere date and trailer being announced in September 2013.

The season premiere "A Catered Affair to Remember" was aired on November 4, 2013, while the nineteenth episode "Are You My Friend?" served as the season finale, and was aired on March 10, 2014. It was followed by a three-part reunion that aired on March 17, March 24 and March 31, 2014 and a "Secrets Revealed" episode on April 7, 2014, which marked the conclusion of the season. Alex Baskin, Chris Cullen, Douglas Ross, Greg Stewart, Toni Gallagher, Dave Rupel and Andy Cohen are recognized as the series' executive producers; it is produced and distributed by Evolution Media.

== Cast and synopsis ==
=== Cast ===
Five of the seven wives from season three returned for the fourth installment. Adrienne Maloof was let go from the series during the reunion from season three, due to her lack of attendance. At the reunion, host and Executive Producer, Andy Cohen, had announced that her not attending would be her last act as a housewife saying, "This season was hard on Adrienne- as you know all know a secret about her family was revealed by Brandi [Glanville] and from that moment on, Adrienne refused to speak directly about it... Not only is she absent tonight, but she won't be on the show next season." Despite Maloof's dismissal during the reunion, she has claimed she left on her own terms as well as describing the series as an "amazing platform". She has also continued to guest star in later seasons.

Also leaving after the third season is Taylor Armstrong. In June 2013, Armstrong's former castmate Glanville had revealed that Armstrong did not return due to not being asked back. Armstrong continued to guest star from season four to six. In May 2015, Armstrong stated she wouldn't be opposed to returning to the series in a larger capacity as she is a lot happier now.

Besides the two full-time cast members not returning, three recurring cast members also didn't return for season four, Camille Grammer, Faye Resnick and Marisa Zanuck. Grammer who was full-time in season one and two and recurred in season three didn't return for season four by her own choice saying, "there were some good times and some not so good times, but it's very hard to live your life out on the screen." Grammer has continued to guest star in later seasons and shortly in July 2016, Grammer expressed interest in returning saying, "Oh, I love being a part of it for what, it's gonna be six, seven seasons?" as well as saying it's up to Cohen and the higher-ups. Resnick has not revealed why she didn't return in a recurring capacity but since has also returned in guest appearances in later seasons. Zanuck had hinted that she was no longer interested in the show, in her Bravo blog shortly after the finale saying, "in truth, I have moved past all of the drama, and I don’t want to acknowledge it anymore." The following month Zanuck revealed that she was let go from the series after not being asked to return for season four. Zanuck has not returned to the series since.

With the departure of two full-time cast member and three recurring, season four introduced two new full-time cast members, Carlton Gebbia and Joyce Giraud de Ohoven.

Gebbia grew up in South Africa and London prior to moving to Los Angeles to pursue acting, who later went on to have roles in The Young and the Restless and Suddenly Susan. Gebbia is very spiritual with her faith, Wicca, and identifies as a practicing witch. Gebbia grew up in a very spiritual home and has been involved with Wicca since she was seven years old, as her grandmother was a practicing pagan and her mother was psychic. Her faith goes hand-in-hand with her love of nature and animals, so much that she works with Wildlife WayStation, a non-profit Sanctuary in Los Angeles that raises money for exotic and wild animals. Gebbia works closely with her husband David who runs his family multi-faceted business with his father and brothers. The businesses includes Rival Sports Group, managing NBA and NFL players, StockCross Financial Services and Gebbia Custom Estates which is a developer building high-end custom homes in Beverly Hills and Hidden Hills which Gebbia is the interior architectural designer. When Gebbia and her husband aren't working they live in their Gothic-inspired home raising their three children: Destiny, 11, Mysteri, 10, and Cross, 2. Gebbia is currently keeping herself busy writing a horror script as well as writing a children's book with an unusual twist.

Giraud de Ohoven is a Puerto Rico native who started her career at the age of fifteen after she was scouted while working at KFC. Giraud de Ohoven focused on her education prior to pursuing modeling, by earning two separate degrees in Social Work and Special Education. She later went on to competing in pageants with holding notable titles such as, Miss World Puerto Rico, Miss Universe Puerto Rico and was the second runner-up at the Miss Universe Pageant in 1998. Her passion of beauty pageants and inspiring other lead to her creating the annual Queen of the Universe pageant, with benefits the programs of the UNESCO Foundation for Children in Need. Besides being a beauty queen, Giraud de Ohoven is an actress, producer and philanthropist. Giraud de Ohoven established herself as an actress by appearing is films such as Dude, Where's My Car? and The Girl with the Dragon Tattoo. Giraud de Ohoven has also made a name for herself on the television by starring in Tyler Perry's House of Payne, Baywatch as well as Siberia, which she also produces. She has also produced other films with her husband, such as Capote and Texas Killing Fields. When she isn't working, she is living happily with her husband, Academy Award-nominee producer Michael Ohoven, and raising their two children together; Leo, 3, and Val, 2.

=== Synopsis ===
The Real Housewives of Beverly Hills season four begins with Yolanda Foster overseeing a photo shoot for her daughter and successful model, Gigi Hadid. Brandi Glanville explores new properties to lease, after the success of her book, Drinking and Tweeting: And Other Brandi Blunders, she wants to live in a house that is fancier. Lisa Vanderpump begins dancing practice for her new role on Dancing with the Stars with her younger, attractive, partner Gleb Savchenko. Later in Kyle Richard's kitchen, Vanderpump addresses the gossip magazines about Kyle's husband Mauricio Umansky cheating. Vanderpump makes a joke about the younger woman Umansky had allegedly been seeing was his daughter, Portia, which Kyle doesn't find funny. Kim Richards struggles with the training and teaching of her dog that she has now had for a year. Kyle, after joining the Chamber of Commerce, throws an extravagant cocktail party with catering from Vanderpump's restaurant, SUR. Drama soon ensues with a star from Vanderpump Rules, Kristen Doute, giving attitude to Vanderpump and being sent home. Fellow members of the chamber of commerce, Carlton Gebbia and Joyce Giraud de Ohoven arrive at the party. Gebbia and Vanderpump initially bond over both being British, while Giraud de Ohoven and Glanville remember that have met previously at a mutual friend's baby shower. At the party, Kyle attempts to put aside her issues with Foster and Vanderpump tries to ease the tension between Brandi Glanville and another employee of hers, Scheana Shay. At the party, Giraud de Ohoven makes a joke about her husband being naked which Gebbia doesn't find pleasant due to her vivid imagination. The tension between the two worsens when Giraud de Ohoven makes a comment on Gebbia's son's name and after Kyle's comments on Vanderpump's nipple, Gebbia questions Kyle's intentions.

Vanderpump continues to compete on Dancing with the Stars and Glanville and the Richards sister attend to support her. The following week, Vanderpump faints during rehearsal and continues to perform anyway but some of the ladies question the integrity of the faint. Vanderpump finds herself taken aback after Giraud de Ohoven makes an accusation, that also leaves everyone else confused. In Puerto Rico, Vanderpump is confront by the ladies about their doubts in the friendship. The confrontation continues at dinner, which result in Vanderpump husband calling Foster stupid and couple leaving the table after feeling like it was a sabotage attack. . The next day they rest of the women learn that Vanderpump and her husband had left in the middle of the night. Vanderpump heads back to Beverly Hill and informs Gebbia, who wasn't invited on the trip, about what happened. At the Beverly Hilton hotel for the Beverly Hills 100th anniversary, Vanderpump comes face-to-face with the ladies for the first time since Puerto Rico. She finds herself in many arguments. Glanville and Vanderpump come to the conclusion that they are no longer friends.

Kyle hosts a lunch for her new friends on the chamber of commerce, Gebbia and Giraud de Ohoven, but after she kills a bee, she has offended Gebbia. Kyle finds herself in the hot seat at Gebbia's luncheon after Glanville brings up the tabloid accusations about her husband's cheating. Kyle gets into a heated argument with Glanville in Palm Springs after Glanville riles Giraud de Ohoven up. On the trip after Foster attempts to help resolve Glanville and Kyle's issue, Kyle is left in tears and leaves the table. Kyle hosts a fashion show at her boutique and worries that Glanville and Giraud de Ohoven will cause drama as they are both walking the runway and has some important guess coming such as her former costar from Halloween, Jamie Lee Curtis and Lisa Rinna. Kyle attends Gebbia's annual pool party despite their shaky friendship and offends Gebbia after mistakenly sees her new tattoo as the Jewish star. Kyle co-hosts a joint party with Vanderpump for their husband. At the dinner Kyle is confronted by Gebbia on her alleged ignorance and uses a word that fires Gebbia up. Kyle continues to grow closer to Glanville and the two strengthen their bond when Glanville confides in Kyle over her doubts in her and her friendship with Vanderpump. Kyle reveals to Giraud de Ohoven that she thinks Gebbia has cast a spell on her because she received some strange, spooky words on her computer while feeding her daughter Portia a snack. Kyle breaks Giraud de Ohoven's trust after she reveals some information about her father to the rest of the group.

Kim and her sister Kyle catch up to watch the recent episode of Vanderpump on Dancing with the Stars, after witnessing the faint the pair deem it insincere and claim it was staged. Kim and her sisters, Kyle and Kathy, attend her daughter's high school graduation. Unable to teach her dog discipline, Kim sends her dog, Kinglsey, off to doggy boarding school. Kim hosts a luau for her daughter who is leaving to go to college, but isn't happy by the state that Gebbia and Glanville arrive in- tipsy and nauseous. During the reunion, Kim confronts Vanderpump on her feelings and takes side with Glanville and Foster.

Glanville continues to move into her new home and her mom arrives from Sacramento to help her settle in. At Gebbia's luncheon Glanville brings up the tabloids in regards to Kyle's marriage. At a circus school with Kim, Glanville reveals she believes Kyle is calling her a bully in the tabloids. During a day of shopping, Glanville reveals to Vanderpump that her and Gebbia had kissed. In Palm Springs, Glanville reveals to all the ladies about the kiss, which Gebbia isn't happy about and later, Glanville provokes Giraud de Ohoven by calling her a bunch of names which results to Glanville getting into an argument with Kyle. During the trip, Foster insists on the Kyle and Glanville resolving their issues, which result in Kyle leaving the table in tears. Still on the trip, Glanville receives an unexpected phone call and is informed her beloved dog is missing. Glanville in infuriated after Giraud de Ohoven relates it to her. During a fine-dining night at Fosters, Glanville begins to insult Giraud de Ohoven. Glanville is confronted by Giraud de Ohoven at Vanderpump's restaurant, which involved a lot of swearing and leaves Vanderpump's staff in awe. After drinking and pole-dancing, Glanville arrives nauseous at Kim's luau for he daughter's leaving for college. Glanville takes a trip to Sacramento to promote her book, but invites Foster along as she is nervous about seeing her estranged father. Glanville who has grown closer to Kyle, reveals to both Richards sisters that is having doubts with her friendship with Vanderpump and they all discuss that Vanderpump isn't easy to be friends with. At Foster's going away party for her daughter, Glanville begins to a void Vanderpump. Glanville and Foster confront Vanderpump on their feeling in Puerto Rico, which doesn't go well resulting in both Vanderpump and her husband leaving. At the Beverly Hills 100th anniversary, Glanville once again confronts Vanderpump which results in some honest truth that may prevent the friendship from moving forward. With the ending of the friendship, Glanville is emotional as she has also lost the friendship with Vanderpump's husband.

Foster, who has recently been diagnosed with Lyme disease faces a surgical procedure in order to battle her new diagnosis. Foster's mother and brother arrive from the Netherlands and just in time to witness Foster's husband, David Foster, receive his star on the Hollywood Walk of Fame. During the Palm Springs trip, Foster inserts herself between Kyle and Glanville and encourages the two to resolve their issues. Kyle leaves the able in tears and Foster follows and comforts her. Foster hosts a night of fine-dining with music supplied by The Tenors and divides the group in two with her "dream team" place cards. After the intense dinner at Vanderpump's restaurant, Foster reprimands Glanville on her behavior. Foster joins Glanville for a trip to Sacramento, to help mediate Glanville and her estranged father. Foster invites the ladies to her Malibu home for some sentimental painting but after Vanderpump cancels last minute, she begins to question their friendship. In Puerto Rico, Foster and Glanville confront Vanderpump on the doubt in the friendship, Foster then finds herself in an argument with Vanderpump's husband after he calls her stupid. At the Beverly Hills 100th anniversary, Foster is once again in argument with Vanderpump's husband Ken. She confronts him on his behavior and gets defensive when he touches her arm.

Gebbia is offended by Kyle at a lunch after Kyle kills a bee. Hosts a luncheon at her Gothic-inspired home and invites the ladies to attend. She reveals she is practicing which, but Kyle's curiosity by asking too many question upset her. During a trip to Palm springs, Gebbia confronts Kyle on a list of issues she has with her, and later receives a lot of eye rolls from the ladies when talking about her faith. Gebbia takes her mother-in-law lingerie shopping for her husband. Gebbia attends a pole-dancing class under the influence and later goes to Kim's luau for her daughter tipsy. Gebbia hosts her annual pool part with the women invited . She shows Kyle her new tattoo of the pentagram on the back of her neck but is taken aback when Kyle thinks it's the Jewish star. Later at Foster's home for some painting, Gebbia finds herself in a heated discussion with Giraud de Ohoven over her lack of belief in witchcraft. Gebbia warns her that she will believe once she sees which results in the accusations that Gebbia has cursed Giraud de Ohoven's family but Gebbia denies her accusations. During a joint birthday dinner for Kyle and Vanderpump's husband, Gebbia confronts Kyle on the way she has offend, including the ignorance in regarding her faith and her ignorance with her tattoo. The argument is intensified when Kyle uses the term "anti-Semitic". Gebbia co-hosts a business party with her husband and has uninvited Kyle. Gebbia once again is accused of casting spells when Kyle reveals her screensaver on her computer acted weird while Kyle fed Portia a snack, which results in Kyle and Giraud de Ohoven not inviting her on the trip to Puerto Rico. Gebbia who wasn't invited on the trip to Puerto Rico, console an emotional Vanderpump after she unexpectedly return early.

Giraud de Ohoven is invited by Kyle to attend a lunch with Gebbia, Kyle and Giraud de Ohoven bond but it's clear that Gebbia is the odd one out after the two rejoice in killing a bee. Giraud de Ohoven gets in to an argument with Glanville after Glanville calls her "Jaclyn" because her name Joyce sounds like "a big, fat pig." After being insulted by Glanville at Foster's night of fine-ding, Giraud de Ohoven and her husband express their anger and contempt for Glanville on the limo ride home. During a dinner at Vanderpump's restaurant, Glanville and Giraud de Ohoven get into a yelling match involving a lot of curse words over Glanville's recent behavior. The two later attempt to resolve their issues at Kim's luau but leave with mixed results. During a day of painting at Foster's she reveals she doesn't believe in witch craft, and after Gebbia's warnings, she starts to believe them when she thinks Gebbia has cursed her husband. Giraud de Ohoven bond with Kyle over feeling like Gebbia has cast a spell on them both. Giraud de Ohoven reveals to Kyle that her father has died, but when Kyle reveals that the group Giraud de Ohoven ends up feeling betrayed.

== Reception ==
=== U.S. television ratings ===
The Real Housewives of Beverly Hills season four premiered to 1.59 million total viewers and was surpassed on December 2, 2013, with episode five which aired to 1.9 million viewers, that marked a season-to-date high in all key demographics. Season four saw a new ratings high with episode seven, which earned over 2 million total viewers and 1.1 rating (18–49 aged viewers), that was a 9 percent increase. Episode nine, that aired on December 30, 2013, marked the highest-rated episode of the season with 1.7 rating (18–49 aged viewers) and 3 million total viewers. During its run, season four was averaging 2.5 million total viewers, but by the end of the season it increased to 2.7 million total viewers (1.6 million 18–49 aged viewers).

== Episodes ==
The Real Housewives of Beverly Hills season 4 episodes
No. overall	No. in season	Title	Original release date	U.S. viewers (millions)
64	1	"A Catered Affair to Remember"	November 4, 2013	1.59
In the fourth season premiere, the ladies come together at Kyle's cocktail party, where they meet Carlton Gebbia and Joyce de Giraud. Kyle enlists the assistance of Lisa's staff from SUR to cater the event, and Lisa tries to keep things peaceful.
65	2	"Faint Chance"	November 11, 2013	1.72
Lisa asks for the support of the girls as she begins her journey on Dancing with the Stars. Kyle slips up and says some things that offend the new housewives. Yolanda learns that she has to undergo surgery for her Lyme disease. Brandi's mother comes to visit.
66	3	"Life's a Witch"	November 18, 2013	1.78
New housewife Carlton hosts her introductory lunch with the wives at her Gothic mansion. The women begin to question Kyle regarding the infidelity rumors surrounding her husband Mauricio.
67	4	"Irked at Cirque"	November 25, 2013	1.63
Kim invites the group to a circus school in Hollywood. Kyle and Brandi get into an argument. The ladies are stunned after Joyce makes a surprising accusation.
68	5	"Star of the Family"	December 2, 2013	1.90
Carlton pays a visit to the acupuncturist for her cat. Kyle, Kim and Kathy show their support for Kim's daughter at her high school graduation. Brandi dishes some gossip regarding Carlton. Yolanda is excited to see her mother and brother who are visiting from her native Holland.
69	6	"Palm Springs Breakers"	December 9, 2013	1.85
All the housewives head out to Palm Springs for their yearly bonding trip. Carlton pulls out her list of issues about the ladies. Brandi discloses that she and Carlton made out. Carlton gets questioned about her pentagram tattoo, to which she tells the ladies that she is a practicing Wiccan. Brandi begins to poke at Joyce by calling her Jaclyn and later at dinner, drunk Brandi emerges and starts a fight with Kyle.
70	7	"Escape to Bitch Mountain"	December 16, 2013	2.01
Brandi feels that it's time for Yolanda and Kyle to leave what happened in Paris behind them. Kim has had enough of Lisa trying to quiet her down. Carlton and Kim spend some time together while feeding squirrels. Brandi is in disbelief when she receives word that her dog is missing.
71	8	"She Hears You, She Hears You Not"	December 23, 2013	1.73
Kim decides to send her dog away to receive treatment for his behavior. Yolanda's words ends up causing a divide between the ladies.
72	9	"Guess Who's Coming to Dinner?"	December 30, 2013	2.01
Yolanda and David have a romantic dinner date to celebrate their anniversary. Carlton goes shopping with her mother-in-law. Kim is presented with the chance to ride in a racecar. Joyce and Brandi are still not on good terms but come head-to-head when they attend the same event.
73	10	"Catfight on the Catwalk"	January 6, 2014	1.83
Carlton receives a tattoo. Yolanda tries to tell Brandi that she needs to control herself. Kim's dog returns home from dog boot camp. Brandi and Joyce are both given the chance to walk the runway at Kyle's fashion show, which raises money for charity. NOTE : future housewife Lisa Rinna made a cameo on the red carpet at Kyle's fashion show.
74	11	"Luaus and Lies"	January 13, 2014	1.80
75	12	"Tough Break"	January 20, 2014	1.79
Brandi visits her hometown to mend her relationship with her estranged father, and invites Yolanda along for the trip. Joyce sets up a self-defense class for her and all the ladies.
76	13	"The Curse of Carlton"	January 27, 2014	1.95
Carlton invites all the housewives over for her annual pool party, where Kyle gifts Carlton a necklace. Kim goes to a Hollywood autograph show. Yolanda has all the ladies come over.
77	14	"The Birthday Witch"	February 3, 2014	1.91
Kyle and Lisa plan to host a combined birthday celebration for their husbands. Lisa wants Brandi to speak with Scheana from SUR. Kyle and Carlton have an altercation. Joyce questions Carlton about a spell.
78	15	"Trail of Doubts"	February 10, 2014	1.92
Kim sits down with Lisa and Ken to talk about their issues. Brandi discloses some information to Kyle and Kim. Carlton hosts a party for her husband's clients.
79	16	"Turning Down the Crown"	February 17, 2014	1.71
Joyce and Kyle plan on not inviting Carlton on their upcoming girls trip. Brandi avoids Lisa at Gigi's party. Carlton refuses Kyle's peace offering. Kyle ends up revealing private information to the group.
80	17	"Lines in the Sand"	February 24, 2014	1.80
All of the housewives, excluding Carlton, fly to Puerto Rico. Joyce takes some time to visit her family. Brandi and Yolanda end up confronting Lisa. Kyle questions her friendship with Lisa. An altercation occurs during dinner.
81	18	"The Kids Are All Right"	March 3, 2014	1.83
The ladies continue their trip activities by golfing, shopping, and possibly getting arrested. Brandi has a surprise for her parents. Kim and Yolanda say goodbye to their daughters as they depart for college. Lisa sits down with Carlton to explain why she departed Puerto Rico early. NOTE : Former housewife Taylor Armstrong and her daughter Kennedy briefly appeared with Kyle and her daughters at the piercing salon.
82	19	"Are You My Friend?"	March 10, 2014	1.95
The ladies are invited to an event at The Beverly Hills Hotel, where they're together for the first time since Puerto Rico. Kim takes the opportunity to apologize to Ken. Yolanda, Brandi, and Kyle try to fix things with Lisa.
83	20	"Reunion Part 1"	March 17, 2014	1.72
84	21	"Reunion Part 2"	March 24, 2014	1.96
85	22	"Reunion Part 3"	March 31, 2014	1.82
86	23	"Secrets Revealed"	April 7, 2014	1.37
