= Jack N. Green =

American cinematographer and film director

- Born: John Niel Green; August 10, 1946 (age 79); San Francisco, California, U.S.
- Years active: 1974–2020

John Niel Green ASC (born August 10, 1946), is an American cinematographer and film director, best known for his collaborations with director Clint Eastwood from 1986 to 2000.

== Biography ==
=== Early life ===
Green was born in 1946, in San Francisco, California, to Trudy and John Green, Sr.

His parents were photography enthusiasts. Their home-made darkroom had a strong artistic impact on Green. At age 17, Green graduated from both high school and barber college, expecting to become a career barber.

=== Early career ===
A regular barbershop customer, cameraman Joseph Dieves—who had been a combat cameraman in World War II—excited Green with tales of the trade. Green eventually joined Dieves to work on small television productions for various production companies, including San Francisco’s W.A. Palmer. In 1965 Dieves sponsored Green's union membership.

In the summer of 1966, Green was assistant cameraman for a documentary, in Oregon, about the movie The Way West. His work was chiefly on aerial shots.

In 1968, Green moved to Hollywood where he began his career as an assistant to Emmy-winning cinematographer Donald M. Morgan. He worked primarily on aerial unit photography, shooting helicopter exteriors for the film Bob & Carol & Ted & Alice. After being laid off, he fell in with Michael W. Watkins, who got him a job as a camera operator on the Jonathan Demme film Fighting Mad.

He spent much of the 1970s and early 1980s freelancing as an operator under DPs like William A. Fraker, Ric Waite, Harry Stradling Jr., and Bruce Surtees, shooting films like Bronco Billy, 48 Hrs., Pale Rider, and Beverly Hills Cop.

=== Clint Eastwood films ===
He first met Clint Eastwood on the set of the film The Gauntlet, and proceeded to operate on every single Eastwood film until being promoted to DP on Heartbreak Ridge after being recommended by Surtees.

Because of Eastwood's tendency to reuse the same crew from film-to-film, Green shot every Eastwood-directed film between 1986 and 2000, with Space Cowboys being their final collaboration.

Green's work on the 1992 western, Unforgiven earned him nominations for an Academy Award and a BAFTA Award for best cinematography. He was also a nominee for the ASC Award for the 1995 film, The Bridges of Madison County.

=== Recent career ===
Since 2000, Green has worked on over fifteen films in genres ranging from science fiction (Serenity) to action (A Man Apart) and comedy (50 First Dates, The 40-Year-Old Virgin, Hot Tub Time Machine).

He made his directorial debut with Traveller, a 1997 crime drama starring Bill Paxton and Mark Wahlberg.

Green has been a member of the American Society of Cinematographers (ASC) since 1992.

== Filmography ==
Film

Year	Title	Director
1986	Heartbreak Ridge	Clint Eastwood
1987	Like Father Like Son	Rod Daniel
1988	Bird	Clint Eastwood
1988	The Dead Pool	Buddy Van Horn
1989	Pink Cadillac	Buddy Van Horn
1989	Race for Glory	Rocky Lang
1990	White Hunter Black Heart	Clint Eastwood
1990	The Rookie	Clint Eastwood
1991	Deceived	Damian Harris
1992	Love Crimes	Lizzie Borden
1992	Unforgiven	Clint Eastwood
1993	Rookie of the Year	Daniel Stern
1993	A Perfect World	Clint Eastwood
1994	Trapped in Paradise	George Gallo
1995	Bad Company	Damian Harris
1995	The Bridges of Madison County	Clint Eastwood
1995	The Net	Irwin Winkler
1995	The Amazing Panda Adventure	Christopher Cain
1996	Twister	Jan de Bont
1997	Absolute Power	Clint Eastwood
1997	Speed 2: Cruise Control	Jan de Bont
1997	Traveller	Himself
1997	Midnight in the Garden of Good and Evil	Clint Eastwood
1999	True Crime	Clint Eastwood
1999	Girl, Interrupted	James Mangold
2000	Space Cowboys	Clint Eastwood
2001	Pretty When You Cry	Himself
2003	A Man Apart	F. Gary Gray
2003	Secondhand Lions	Tim McCanlies
2004	50 First Dates	Peter Segal
2004	Against the Ropes	Charles S. Dutton
2005	The 40-Year-Old Virgin	Judd Apatow
2005	Serenity	Joss Whedon
2007	Are We Done Yet?	Steve Carr
2008	My Best Friend's Girl	Howard Deutch
2010	Hot Tub Time Machine	Steve Pink
2010	Diary of a Wimpy Kid	Thor Freudenthal
2011	Diary of a Wimpy Kid: Rodrick Rules	David Bowers
2014	The Letters	William Riead
2014	Left Behind	Vic Armstrong
2020	The Pendant	Jeffrey N. Albert

Television

Year	Title	Director	Notes
1993	The Adventures of Brisco County, Jr.	Bryan Spicer	Episode "Pilot"
1997	Eastwood on Eastwood	Richard Schickel	Documentary film

Short film

Year	Title	Director
2001	Golden Dreams	Agnieszka Holland
2012	Reign	Kimberly Jentzen

== Awards and nominations ==
Year	Award	Category	Title	Result
1992	Academy Awards	Best Cinematography	Unforgiven	Nominated
1992	BAFTA Awards	Best Cinematography	Unforgiven	Nominated
1992	Boston Society of Film Critics	Best Cinematography	Unforgiven	Won
1992	Los Angeles Film Critics Association	Best Cinematography	Unforgiven	Won
1992	Dallas–Fort Worth Film Critics Association	Best Cinematography	Unforgiven	Won
1992	National Society of Film Critics	Best Cinematography	Unforgiven	Won
1995	American Society of Cinematographers	Outstanding Achievement in Cinematography	The Bridges of Madison County	Nominated
1998	Society of Camera Operators	President's Award		Won
2003	Big Bear Lake International Film Festival	Lifetime Achievement Award		Won
2009	American Society of Cinematographers	Lifetime Achievement Award		Won
