= Gleb Savchenko =

Russian dancer, choreographer, and model

- Глеб Савченко
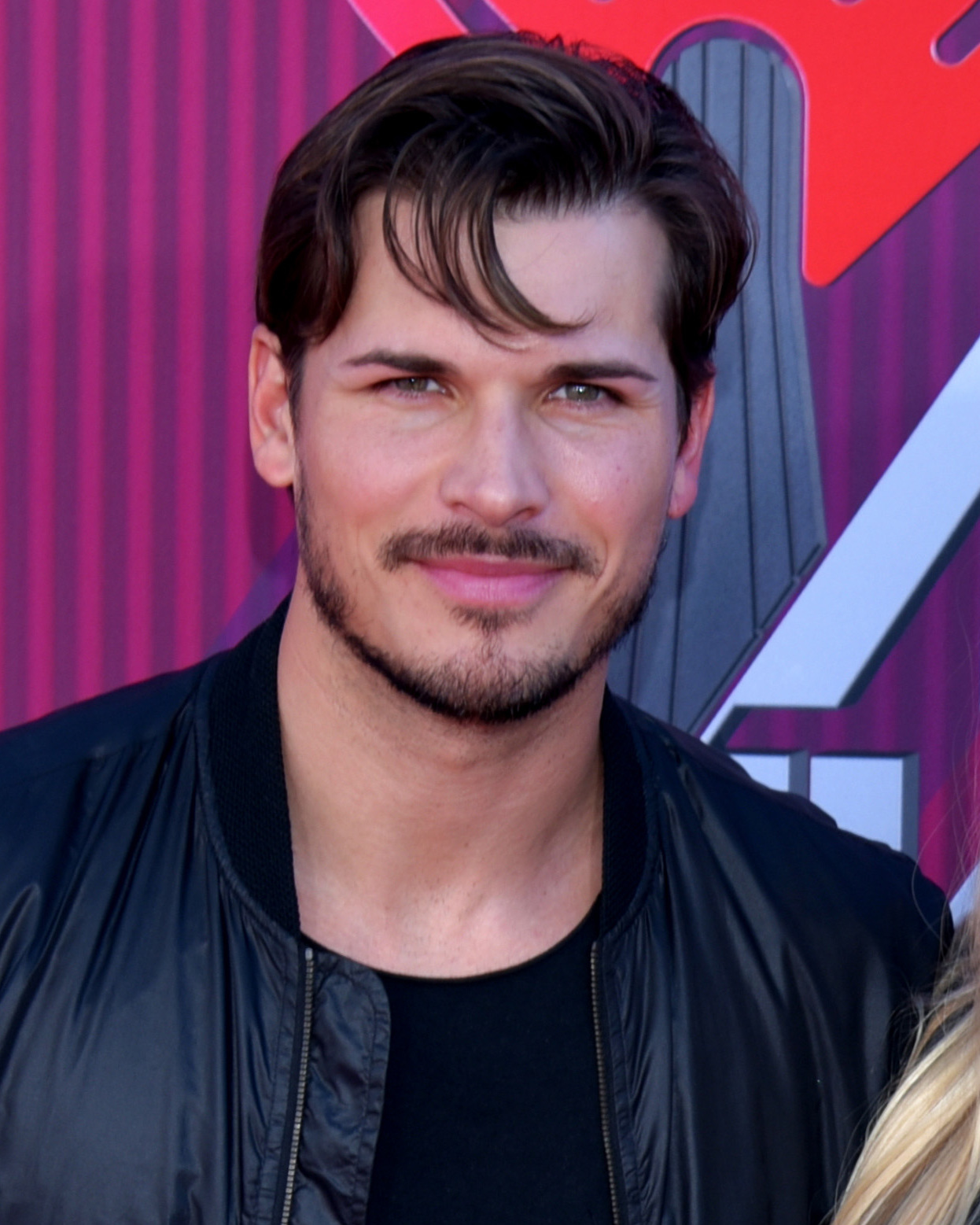
- Savchenko at the 2019 iHeartRadio Music Awards
- Born: 16 September 1983 (age 43); Moscow, Russian SFSR, Soviet Union
- Known for: Dancing with the Stars; Strictly Come Dancing
- Spouse: Elena Samodanova (m. 2006; sep. 2020)
- Children: 2
- Relatives: Valeria Savchenko (sister)

Gleb Savchenko (Russian: Глеб Савченко; born 16 September 1983) is a Russian dancer and choreographer, and a professional dancer on the U.S. version of Dancing with the Stars. He previously appeared on the UK, Australian, and Russian versions of the show.

== Personal life ==
Gleb was born in Moscow. He began dancing at 8 years old.

Gleb was married to professional dancer Elena Samodanova, and they have a daughter, Olivia, born in November 2010. In March 2017, the couple announced that they were expecting their second child. Their second daughter, Zlata, was born on 1 August 2017. In November 2020, after 14 years of marriage, he and his wife Elena announced that they had decided to part ways. In November 2026, Gleb and his girlfriend, Kaitlin Trujillo broke up after a year of dating.

== Dancing with the Stars (Australia) ==
In 2012, Gleb appeared as a professional on the twelfth season of Dancing with the Stars. He was partnered with model Erin McNaught. They were the first couple to be eliminated from the competition, finishing in 11th place.

== Dancing with the Stars (United States) ==
In 2013, Gleb appeared as a professional on season 16 of Dancing with the Stars. He was partnered with The Real Housewives of Beverly Hills star Lisa Vanderpump. They were the second couple to be eliminated from the competition, finishing in 10th place. He also performed as a member of the Troupe in season 17.

Gleb returned as a professional for season 23, where he was partnered with singer and actress Jana Kramer. They reached the finals and finished in fourth place.

For season 24, Savchenko was partnered with singer and The Real Housewives of Beverly Hills star Erika Jayne. They were the fourth couple to be eliminated from the competition, finishing in 9th place.

For season 25, Savchenko was partnered with Pretty Little Liars actress Sasha Pieterse. They were the fourth couple to be eliminated from the competition, finishing in 10th place.

For season 26, Savchenko was partnered with Notre Dame women's basketball player Arike Ogunbowale. They were eliminated in the second week of competition, tying in 7th place with Kareem Abdul-Jabbar and Lindsay Arnold.

For season 27, Savchenko was paired with comedian Nikki Glaser. They were the first couple to be eliminated from the competition, finishing in 13th place.

For season 28, Savchenko was paired with country music singer Lauren Alaina. They reached the finals and finished in 4th place.

For season 29, Savchenko was paired with actress and Selling Sunset star Chrishell Stause. They were eliminated on the eighth week of competition and finished in 8th place.

For season 30, Savchenko was paired with Spice Girls singer Melanie C. They finished in 11th place.

For season 31, Savchenko was paired with drag queen Shangela. They reached the finals and finished in fourth place.

For season 32, Savchenko was paired with actress Mira Sorvino. They finished in 10th place.

For season 33, Savchenko was paired with model Brooks Nader. They finished in 9th place.

For season 34, Savchenko was paired with yoga instructor, podcaster, and entrepreneur Hilaria Baldwin.

| Season | Partner | Place |
|---|---|---|
| 16 | Lisa Vanderpump | 10th |
| 23 | Jana Kramer | 4th |
| 24 | Erika Jayne | 9th |
| 25 | Sasha Pieterse | 10th |
| 26 | Arike Ogunbowale | 7th |
| 27 | Nikki Glaser | 13th |
| 28 | Lauren Alaina | 4th |
| 29 | Chrishell Stause | 8th |
| 30 | Melanie C | 11th |
| 31 | Shangela | 4th |
| 32 | Mira Sorvino | 10th |
| 33 | Brooks Nader | 9th |
| 34 | Hilaria Baldwin | 11th |

=== Season 16 ===
Celebrity partner: Lisa Vanderpump

| Week | Dance | Music | Judges' scores (Note: Individual judges' scores are listed in the following order: Carrie Ann Inaba, Len Goodman, Bruno Tonioli.) | | | Total score | Result |
|---|---|---|---|---|---|---|---|
| 1 | Foxtrot | "Ac-Cent-Tchu-Ate the Positive" — Aretha Franklin | 6 | 6 | 6 | 18 | Safe |
| 2 | Jive | "One Way or Another (Teenage Kicks)" — One Direction | 6 | 6 | 6 | 18 | Safe |
| 3 | Viennese waltz | "I Have Nothing" — Whitney Houston | 7 | 7 | 7 | 21 | Safe |
| 3 | Group; Freestyle | "The Rockafeller Skank" — Fatboy Slim | No scores received | | | | Safe |
| 4 | Cha-cha-cha | "Celebration" — Kool & the Gang | 6 | 6 | 6 | 18 | Eliminated |

=== Season 23 ===
Celebrity partner: Jana Kramer

| Week | Dance | Music | Judges' scores (Note: Individual judges' scores are listed in the following order: Carrie Ann Inaba, Len Goodman, Julianne Hough, Bruno Tonioli.) | | | | Total score | Result |
|---|---|---|---|---|---|---|---|---|
| 1 | Viennese waltz | "Dangerous Woman" — Ariana Grande | 7 | 6 | 6 | 8 | 27 | Safe |
| 2 | Tango | "I Don't Want to Be" — Gavin DeGraw | 7 | 8 | 7 | 7 | 29 | Safe |
| 3 | Jive | "Too Many Fish in the Sea" — Bette Midler | 6 | 7 | 6 | 7 | 26 | Safe (Immunity) |
| 4 | Foxtrot | "Here Comes the Sun" — The Beatles | 8 | —N/a | 7 | 8 | 23 | Safe |
| 5 | Contemporary | "In My Daughter's Eyes" — Martina McBride | 9 | —N/a | 8 | 9 | 26 | Safe |
| 6 | Argentine tango | "Hands to Myself" — Selena Gomez | 10 | —N/a | 10 | 10 | 40 (Note: Jana and Gleb also received a score of 10 from guest judge Pitbull.) | Safe |
| 7 | Samba | "Get Down Tonight" — KC and the Sunshine Band | 8 | 8 | 9 | 9 | 34 | Safe |
| 7 | Freestyle (Team Future) | "Embrace" — Armin van Buuren, feat. Eric Vloeimans | 8 | 9 | 9 | 9 | 35 | Safe |
| 8 | Jazz | "Little Shop of Horrors" — Alan Menken | 9 | —N/a | 9 | 9 | 27 | Safe |
| 8 | Salsa (Dance-off) | "Magic" — Robin Thicke | Winner | | | | 3 (Note: Jana and Gleb received 3 bonus points for winning this dance-off.) | Safe |
| 9 | Waltz | "She Used to Be Mine" — Sara Bareilles | 10 | —N/a | 10 | 10 | 40 (Note: Jana and Gleb also received a score of 10 from guest judge Idina Menzel.) | Safe |
| 9 | Contemporary (Team dance) | "Bird Set Free" — Sia | 10 | —N/a | 10 | 10 | 40 | Safe |
| 10 (Semifinals) | Quickstep | "Go Mama" — Wayne Beckford | 9 | —N/a | 9 | 10 | 28 | Safe |
| 10 (Semifinals) | Paso doble | "Kill of the Night" — Gin Wigmore | 10 | —N/a | 10 | 10 | 30 | Safe |
| 11 (Finals) | Tango | "Stay the Night" — Zedd, feat. Hayley Williams | 8 | 9 | 9 | 9 | 35 | Eliminated |
| 11 (Finals) | Freestyle | "Unstoppable" — Sia | 9 | 9 | 9 | 9 | 36 | Eliminated |

=== Season 24 ===
Celebrity partner: Erika Jayne

| Week | Dance | Music | Judges' scores (Note: Individual judges' scores are listed in the following order: Carrie Ann Inaba, Len Goodman, Julianne Hough, Bruno Tonioli.) | | | | Total score | Result |
|---|---|---|---|---|---|---|---|---|
| 1 | Salsa | "XXPEN$IVE" — Erika Jayne | 6 | 6 | 6 | 6 | 24 | Safe |
| 2 | Foxtrot | "Bad Intentions" — Niykee Heaton | 7 | 7 | 7 | 7 | 28 | Safe |
| 3 | Jive | "Take Me to Heaven" — Alan Menken & Glenn Slater | 6 | 7 | 7 | 6 | 26 | Safe |
| 4 | Cha-cha-cha | "Express Yourself" — Madonna | 8 | 7 | 7 | 8 | 30 | Safe |
| 5 | Viennese waltz | "Unforgettable" — Sia | 8 | 8 | 8 | 8 | 32 | Eliminated |

=== Season 25 ===
Celebrity partner: Sasha Pieterse

| Week | Dance | Music | Judges' scores (Note: Individual judges' scores are listed in the following order: Carrie Ann Inaba, Len Goodman, Bruno Tonioli.) | | | Total score | Result |
|---|---|---|---|---|---|---|---|
| 1 | Cha-cha-cha | "Like That" — Fleur East | 6 | 6 | 6 | 18 | Safe |
| 2 (Night 1) | Viennese waltz | "I'm Going Down" — Rose Royce | 8 | 8 | 7 | 23 | Safe |
| 2 (Night 2) | Samba | "Most Girls" — Hailee Steinfeld | 8 | 7 | 7 | 22 | Safe |
| 3 | Jazz | "I Can't Help Myself (Sugar Pie Honey Bunch)" — The Four Tops | 7 | 6 | 6 | 19 | Safe |
| 4 | Foxtrot | "Over My Head (Cable Car)" — The Fray | 8 | 8 | 8 | 24 | Safe |
| 5 | Rumba | "Kiss the Girl" — Samuel E. Wright | 8 | 8 | 8 | 24 | Eliminated |

=== Season 26 ===
Celebrity partner: Arike Ogunbowale

| Week | Dance | Music | Judges' scores (Note: Individual judges' scores are listed in the following order: Carrie Ann Inaba, Len Goodman, Bruno Tonioli.) | | | Total score | Result |
|---|---|---|---|---|---|---|---|
| 1 | Salsa | "Them Girls" — Whitney Myer | 7 | 6 | 7 | 20 | Safe |
| 2 | Foxtrot | "What About Us" — Pink | 8 | 8 | 8 | 33 (Note: Arike and Gleb also received a score of 9 from guest judge Rashad Jennings.) | Eliminated |
| 2 | Freestyle (Team 1970s Football) | "Instant Replay" — Dan Hartman | 9 | 9 | 9 | 37 (Note: This team also received a score of 10 from guest judge Rashad Jennings.) | Eliminated |

=== Season 27 ===
Celebrity partner: Nikki Glaser

| Week | Dance | Music | Judges' scores (Note: Individual judges' scores are listed in the following order: Carrie Ann Inaba, Len Goodman, Bruno Tonioli.) | | | Total score | Result |
|---|---|---|---|---|---|---|---|
| 1 (Night 1) | Salsa | "YES" — Louisa, feat. 2 Chainz | 6 | 5 | 6 | 17 | Bottom five |
| 1 (Night 2) | Salsa | "Tres Deseos" — Gloria Estefan | 6 | 6 | 6 | 18 | Eliminated |

=== Season 28 ===
Celebrity partner: Lauren Alaina

| Week | Dance | Music | Judges' scores (Note: Individual judges' scores are listed in the following order: Carrie Ann Inaba, Len Goodman, Bruno Tonioli.) | | | Total score | Result |
|---|---|---|---|---|---|---|---|
| 1 | Cha-cha-cha | "Man! I Feel Like a Woman!" — Shania Twain | 7 | 6 | 6 | 19 | Safe |
| 2 | Paso doble | "Confident" — Demi Lovato | 6 | 6 | 7 | 19 | Safe |
| 3 | Tango | "Oh, Pretty Woman" — Roy Orbison | 6 | 7 | 7 | 20 | Safe |
| 4 | Foxtrot | "Jolene" — Dolly Parton | 8 | 8 | 8 | 32 (Note: Lauren and Gleb also received a score of 8 from guest judge Leah Remini.) | Safe |
| 5 | Samba | "Under the Sea" — Samuel E. Wright | 8 | 7 | 8 | 23 | Safe |
| 6 | Contemporary | "The Other Side" — Lauren Alaina | 9 | 8 | 9 | 26 | Safe |
| 7 | Argentine tango | "Whatever Lola Wants" — Gotan Project | 9 | 9 | 9 | 27 | Safe |
| 7 | Freestyle (Team Trick) | "Somebody's Watching Me" — Rockwell | 9 | 9 | 9 | 27 | Safe |
| 8 | Jive | "Hound Dog" — Elvis Presley | 8 | 8 | 8 | 24 | Safe |
| 8 | Salsa (Dance-off) | "Rhythm Is Gonna Get You" — Gloria Estefan & Miami Sound Machine | Loser | | | 0 (Note: Lauren and Gleb received zero bonus points for losing this dance-off.) | Safe |
| 9 | Quickstep | "You Can't Hurry Love" — The Supremes | 9 | 9 | 8 | 34 (Note: Lauren and Gleb also received a score of 8 from guest judge Joey Fatone.) | Bottom two |
| 9 | Rumba | "I Want It That Way" — Backstreet Boys | 9 | 9 | 9 | 36 (Note: Lauren and Gleb also received a score of 9 from guest judge Joey Fatone.) | Bottom two |
| 10 (Semifinals) | Paso doble | "Stronger (What Doesn't Kill You)" — Kelly Clarkson | 9 | 9 | 9 | 27 | Safe |
| 10 (Semifinals) | Viennese waltz | "Humble and Kind" — Tim McGraw | 9 | 9 | 9 | 27 | Safe |
| 11 (Finals) | Foxtrot | "Jolene" — Dolly Parton | 9 | 9 | 9 | 27 | Fourth place |
| 11 (Finals) | Freestyle | "Country Girl (Shake It for Me)" — Luke Bryan | 10 | 10 | 10 | 30 | Fourth place |

=== Season 29 ===
Celebrity partner: Chrishell Stause

| Week | Dance | Music | Judges' scores (Note: Individual judges' scores are listed in the following order: Carrie Ann Inaba, Derek Hough, Bruno Tonioli.) | | | Total score | Result |
|---|---|---|---|---|---|---|---|
| 1 | Tango | "Raise Your Glass" — P!nk | 4 | 5 | 4 | 13 | Safe |
| 2 | Rumba | "This Is Me" — Keala Settle | 6 | 6 | 6 | 18 | Safe |
| 3 | Waltz | "A Dream Is a Wish Your Heart Makes" — Jessie Ware | 7 | 7 | 8 | 22 | Safe |
| 4 | Foxtrot | "Adore You" — Harry Styles | 7 | 8 | 7 | 22 | Safe |
| 5 | Cha-cha-cha | "You Got It (The Right Stuff)" — New Kids on the Block | 6 | 6 | 7 | 19 | Safe |
| 6 | Contemporary | "Stars" — Grace Potter & The Nocturnals | 8 | 8 | 8 | 24 | Safe |
| 7 | Paso doble | "In the Air Tonight" — Helmut Vonlichten | 9 | 9 | 8 | 26 | Safe |
| 8 | Viennese waltz | "Love on the Brain" — Rihanna | 8 | 8 | 8 | 24 | Eliminated |
| 8 | Cha-cha-cha (Dance relay) | "Rain on Me" — Lady Gaga & Ariana Grande | —N/a | | | 2 | Eliminated |

=== Season 30 ===
Celebrity partner: Melanie C

| Week | Dance | Music | Judges' scores (Note: Individual judges' scores are listed in the following order: Carrie Ann Inaba, Len Goodman, Derek Hough, Bruno Tonioli.) | | | | Total score | Result |
|---|---|---|---|---|---|---|---|---|
| 1 | Cha-cha-cha | "Wannabe" — Spice Girls | 7 | 7 | 6 | 7 | 27 | Safe |
| 2 | Foxtrot | "Here Comes the Sun" — The Beatles | 7 | 7 | 8 | 8 | 30 | Safe |
| 3 | Tango | "Toxic" — Britney Spears | 7 | 7 | —N/a | 8 | 22 | Safe |
| 4 (Night 1) | Jazz | "Step in Time" — Dick Van Dyke | 7 | 8 | 8 | 8 | 31 | Safe |
| 4 (Night 2) | Viennese waltz | "Once Upon a Dream" — Lana Del Rey | 9 | 8 | 9 | 9 | 35 | Safe |
| 5 | Quickstep | "You're the One That I Want" — John Travolta & Olivia Newton-John | 9 | 9 | 9 | 9 | 36 | Eliminated |

=== Season 31 ===
Celebrity partner: Shangela

| Week | Dance | Music | Judges' scores (Note: Individual judges' scores are listed in the following order: Carrie Ann Inaba, Len Goodman, Derek Hough, Bruno Tonioli.) | | | | Total score | Result |
|---|---|---|---|---|---|---|---|---|
| 1 | Salsa | "When I Grow Up" — The Pussycat Dolls | 7 | 7 | 7 | 7 | 28 | Safe |
| 2 | Quickstep | "Shake, Rattle and Roll" — Elvis Presley | 7 | 7 | 7 | 7 | 28 | Safe |
| 3 | Rumba | "GoldenEye" — Tina Turner | 8 | 7 | 7 | 8 | 30 | Safe |
| 4 | Charleston | "Dig a Little Deeper" — Jenifer Lewis | 8 | 8 | 8 | 8 | 32 | Safe |
| 5 (Night 1) | Foxtrot | "Roar (Acoustic)" — Katy Perry | 8 | 8 | 8 | 8 | 32 | Safe |
| 5 (Night 2) | Cha-cha-cha | "Waiting for Tonight" — Jennifer Lopez | 9 | 8 | 9 | 9 | 35 | Safe |
| 5 (Night 2) | Hustle & Lindy Hop; Marathon | "Hot Stuff" — Donna Summer & "Jump, Jive an' Wail" — The Brian Setzer Orchestra | —N/a | | | | 10 | Safe |
| 6 | Tango | "Hollywood" — Michael Bublé | 9 | 9 | 9 | 9 | 45 (Note: Shangela and Gleb also received a score of 9 from guest judge Michael Bublé.) | Safe |
| 7 | Jazz | "Look What You Made Me Do" — Taylor Swift | 10 | 10 | 10 | 10 | 40 | Safe |
| 7 | Freestyle (Team Wicked) | "The Witches Are Back" — Bette Midler, Sarah Jessica Parker & Kathy Najimy | 8 | 8 | 9 | 8 | 33 | Safe |
| 8 | Samba | "Spice Up Your Life" — Spice Girls | 10 | 9 | 9 | 9 | 37 | Safe |
| 8 | Cha-cha-cha (Dance relay) | "Ice Ice Baby" — Vanilla Ice | Winner | | | | 5 (Note: Shangela and Gleb received bonus points for winning this dance relay.) | Safe |
| 9 | Paso doble | "The Edge of Glory" — Lady Gaga | 9 | 9 | 9 | 9 | 36 | Bottom three |
| 9 | Viennese waltz | "I Have Nothing" — Whitney Houston | 10 | 9 | 9 | 9 | 37 | Bottom three |
| 10 | Quickstep | "Queen Bee" — Rochelle Diamante | 9 | 9 | 9 | 9 | 36 | Fourth place |
| 10 | Freestyle | "Survivor" — Destiny's Child & "Call Me Mother" — RuPaul | 10 | 10 | 10 | 10 | 40 | Fourth place |

=== Season 32 ===
Celebrity partner: Mira Sorvino

| Week | Dance | Music | Judges' scores (Note: Individual judges' scores are listed in the following order: Carrie Ann Inaba, Derek Hough, Bruno Tonioli.) | | | Total score | Result |
|---|---|---|---|---|---|---|---|
| 1 | Cha-cha-cha | "Kiss" — Prince & The Revolution | 6 | 5 | 6 | 17 | Safe |
| 2 | Salsa | "Bailando" — Enrique Iglesias | 6 | 6 | 6 | 18 | Safe |
| 3 | Rumba | "Let's Get It On" — Marvin Gaye | 6 | 6 | 7 | 26 (Note: Mira and Gleb also received a score of 7 from guest judge Michael Strahan.) | Safe |
| 4 | Waltz | "A Dream Is a Wish Your Heart Makes" (from Cinderella) | 7 | 7 | 7 | 21 | Safe |
| 5 | Contemporary | "Time After Time" — Cyndi Lauper | 7 | 8 | 7 | 22 | Eliminated |

=== Season 33 ===
Celebrity partner: Brooks Nader

| Week | Dance | Music | Judges' scores (Note: Individual judges' scores are listed in the following order: Carrie Ann Inaba, Derek Hough, Bruno Tonioli.) | | | Total score | Result |
|---|---|---|---|---|---|---|---|
| 1 | Tango | "Piece of Me" — Britney Spears | 6 | 6 | 6 | 18 | Safe |
| 2 | Quickstep | "9 to 5" — Dolly Parton | 7 | 6 | 7 | 20 | Safe |
| 3 (Night 1) | Rumba | "Sexual Healing" — Marvin Gaye | 7 | 7^{1} / 7 | 7 | 28 | No elimination |
| 3 (Night 2) | Cha-cha-cha | "Nothin' But a Good Time" — Poison | 8 | 8 / 9^{2} | 8 | 33 | Safe |
| 4 | Salsa | "Mi Gente" — J Balvin and Willy William | 8 | 8 / 8^{3} | 8 | 32 | Eliminated |

Notes

^{1} Score awarded by guest judge Rosie Perez.
^{2} Score awarded by guest judge Gene Simmons.
^{3} Score awarded by guest judge Mark Ballas.

=== Season 34 ===
Celebrity partner: Hilaria Baldwin

| Week | Dance | Music | Judges' scores (Note: Individual judges' scores are listed in the following order: Carrie Ann Inaba, Derek Hough, Bruno Tonioli.) | | | Total score | Result |
|---|---|---|---|---|---|---|---|
| 1 | Cha-cha-cha | "Let's Get Loud" — Jennifer Lopez | (Note: Carrie Ann Inaba was absent due to being sick and there was no replacement for her.) | 7 | 7 | 14 | Safe |
| 2 | Tango | "What Is Love" — Haddaway | 7 | 7 | 7 | 21 | Safe |
| 3 | Samba | "Shake It to the Max (Fly) [Remix]" — Moliy, Silent Addy, Skillibeng & Shenseea | 7 | 8 | 7 | 22 | Safe |
| 4 | Quickstep | "Cantina Band" | 8 | 7 | 8 | 23 | Eliminated |

=== Russia ===
In 2015, Savchenko appeared as a professional on the ninth season of Танцы со звёздами. He was partnered with figure skater Adelina Sotnikova. They reached the finals and finished in second place.

== Strictly Come Dancing ==
In 2015, Savchenko became a professional dancer on Strictly Come Dancing for its thirteenth series. He was partnered with television presenter, Anita Rani. They were eliminated during the semi-finals of the competition, finishing in fifth place.

Gleb announced he would not be returning to Strictly Come Dancing in 2016.

=== Series 13 ===
Celebrity partner: Anita Rani

| Week | Dance | Music | Judges' scores (Note: Individual judges' scores are listed in the following order: Craig Revel Horwood, Darcey Bussell, Len Goodman, Bruno Tonioli.) | | | | Total score | Result |
|---|---|---|---|---|---|---|---|---|
| 1 | Cha-cha-cha | "Rather Be" — Clean Bandit, feat. Jess Glynne | 6 | 7 | 7 | 7 | 27 | Safe |
| 2 | Charleston | "Pencil Full of Lead" — Paolo Nutini | 7 | 8 | 6 | 6 | 27 | Safe |
| 3 | American Smooth | "Unchained Melody" (from Ghost) | 6 | 8 | 8 | 7 | 29 | Safe |
| 4 | Samba | "Hips Don't Lie" — Shakira | 6 | 7 | 7 | 7 | 27 | Safe |
| 5 | Tango | "Sweet Disposition" — The Temper Trap | 8 | 8 | 8 | 8 | 32 | Safe |
| 6 | Waltz | "Once Upon a Dream" — Lana Del Rey | 6 | 8 | 8 | 7 | 29 | Safe |
| 7 | Jive | "The Boy Does Nothing" — Alesha Dixon | 8 | 8 | 9 | 9 | 34 | Safe |
| 8 | Quickstep | "Don't Get Me Wrong" — The Pretenders | 8 | 8 | 8 | 8 | 32 | Safe |
| 9 | Paso doble | "Malagueña" — Connie Francis | 9 | 10 | 9 | 9 | 37 | Safe |
| 10 | Rumba | "Read All About It, Pt. III" — Emeli Sandé | 7 | 8 | 7 | 9 | 31 | Safe |
| 10 | Quickstep-athon (Quickstep Marathon) | "Sing Sing Sing" — The Andrews Sisters | —N/a | | | | 4 (Note: Anita and Gleb received four points in this dance marathon.) | Safe |
| 11 | Argentine tango | "Cell Block Tango" (from Chicago) | 6 | 8 | 9 | 8 | 31 | Safe |
| 12 (Semi-final) | Foxtrot | "New York, New York" — Frank Sinatra | 7 | 8 | 8 | 9 | 32 | Eliminated |
| 12 (Semi-final) | Salsa | "Feel This Moment" — Pitbull, feat. Christina Aguilera | 8 | 8 | 8 | 8 | 32 | Eliminated |

== Other shows ==
In 2013, while partnered with partner Lisa Vanderpump, Savchenko appeared on the first and second episode of the fourth season of The Real Housewives of Beverly Hills at a Dinner Party after the first show along with Lisa's castmates.

In 2015, Savchenko took part in the 9th season of Russian version of Dancing with the Stars called Танцы со звёздами (Россия). He was partnered with Russian figure skater and 2014 Winter Olympics gold medalist Adelina Sotnikova and placed second.

In 2016, Savchenko took part in the British television cooking show Celebrity MasterChef. In August 2018, Savchenko took part in Celebs on the Farm. He became the first winner of the series.

In January 2023, he appeared as himself and as the best man in Dancing with the Stars co-star Artem Chigvintsev's and Nikki Bella's four-part wedding series, Nikki Bella Says I Do on the E! network.
