= Love Thy Nader =

American reality television series

- Genre: Reality
- Starring: Brooks Nader; Sarah Jane Nader; Grace Ann Nader; Mary Holland Nader
- Country of origin: United States
- Original language: English
- No. of seasons: 1
- No. of episodes: 8

Production
- Executive producers: Rachel Tung; Jimmy Kimmel; James "Baby Doll" Dixon; Brandon Panaligan; Amanda Weinstein
- Producers: Hampton Story; Scott Lonker
- Production companies: Walt Disney Television Alternative; Kimmelot; Smoking Baby Productions

Original release
- Network: Freeform
- Release: August 26, 2025 – present

Love Thy Nader is an American reality television series that premiered on August 26, 2025, on Freeform.

In November 2025, the series was renewed for a second season.

== Premise ==
Louisiana's Nader sisters tried to make it as models in New York City.

== Episodes ==
No.	Title	Original release date	U.S. viewers (millions)
1	"Not in the Bayou Anymore"	August 26, 2025	N/A
Supermodel Brooks Nader and her three sisters move in together. The sisters' parents visit to celebrate Brooks' fashion line.
2	"Threesomes in Joshua Tree"	August 26, 2025	N/A
Brooks and Gleb deal with relationship problems. Grace Ann faces off with her agent. The sisters go on vacation in Miami.
3	"Kegs and Legs"	September 2, 2025 (Note: These episodes were first released on Hulu on August 27, 2025.)	N/A
Brooks misses her sister's birthday because of work.
4	"Easter Slaps"	September 2, 2025	N/A
Sarah Jane brings a girl home for an Easter crawfish boil and confronts her conservative hometown.
5	"Get Real"	September 9, 2025	N/A
Brooks has trouble with an ex. Sarah Jane is confronted for her behavior.
6	"Sex, Swimwear and Salmon Sperm"	September 9, 2025	N/A
Brooks embraces being single. Grace Ann is hired for a big modeling job.
7	"Panic in the Bathtub"	September 16, 2025	N/A
Brooks deals with a health problem right before a shoot. Mary Holland faces problems with her startup.
8	"Sisterhood Above All"	September 16, 2025	N/A
Sarah Jane's pride party is turned upside down after a DM. The sisters have to choose between romance and family.

== Reception ==
Decider praised the show and how the sisters "aren't afraid to get into the mess". They also compared the show to early seasons of Keeping Up with the Kardashians because of the focus on familial relationships and drama.
