= Pretty When You Cry =

2001 film by Jack N. Green

- Directed by: Jack N. Green
- Written by: Christopher Keller
- Produced by: David Gebbia; Gloria Gebbia; John Gebbia; Richard Gebbia; Peter N. Green; Christopher Keller
- Starring: Sam Elliott; Jamie Kennedy; Carlton Elizabeth
- Cinematography: Jack N. Green
- Edited by: Samuel Craven
- Music by: Normand Corbeil
- Production company: Gebbia Entertainment
- Distributed by: HBO Films
- Release date: 27 November 2001
- Running time: 90 minutes
- Country: United States
- Language: English
- Budget: $1 million

Pretty When You Cry (also known as Seduced: Pretty When You Cry) is 2001 American erotic thriller film directed by Jack N. Green.

== Synopsis ==
Detective Black (Elliott) conducts a procedural interrogation on Albert Straka (Kennedy), a quiet and unassuming man who is a suspect in the brutal and violent murder of Frank (Cavalieri), a drug and sex addict who owns a nightclub. He gets Albert to admit that he had strong feelings towards Frank's wife, Sarah (Elizabeth), but that she was into far too kinky sex for him to ever fall in love with. As the interrogation continues, it is revealed that the sordid sexual relationship among the three grew increasingly bizarre.

== Principal cast ==
Actor	Role
Sam Elliott	Detective Lukas Black
Jamie Kennedy	Albert Straka
Carlton Elizabeth	Sarah Carreni
Michael Cavalieri	Frank Carreni
Lori Heuring	Emily
Keith David	Detective Charles Desett
Nick Swardson	Shaun

== Critical reception ==
From Christopher Null of Filmcritic.com:

Carlton Elizabeth (known as Carlton Lynx when she was doing softcore porn) steals the show as said girlfriend (she's been being abused, natch) with her trashy good looks and willingness to throw her body into the role, literally, but on the whole this is one hell of an awful movie.

From Anee Teepesh of Geniuses Who Have Opinions on Films:

Pretty When You Cry is actually quite an experiment in boredom. The story's twists are quite uninteresting and the eroticness of the film may get a lifer in prison a little excited but that is about it... Sam Elliot I've never minded but as with Jamie Kennedy, they both seem to be stuck in this horrible movie with no escape. Two decent talents with a go nowhere script.
