= Carlton Gebbia =

British actress, interior designer, and television personality

- Born: 17 October 1973 (age 52); Guernsey, Channel Islands
- Other name: Carlton Lynx (Note: Gebbia went under the pseudonym Carlton Lynx when she was doing softcore porn.)
- Occupations: Actress; interior designer; television personality
- Years active: 1994–2014
- Spouse: David Gebbia (m. 1997; div. 2018)
- Children: 3

Carlton Gebbia (born 17 October 1973) is a former British actress, interior designer, and television personality. Gebbia's major acting credit is her starring role in the 2001 erotic thriller Pretty When You Cry, however, she is best known for her appearance on The Real Housewives of Beverly Hills for its fourth season.

== Early life ==
Gebbia was born 17 October 1973 in the Guernsey Islands. At age 14, her family moved to South Africa, four years later she moved to Greenwich, London, after she struggled with living under Apartheid and being harassed for not adhering to it.

Gebbia practices Wicca and is open about her religious beliefs. Gebbia was raised in a pagan household until her mother got married when Gebbia was seven years old. Like Gebbia, her grandmother was a pagan but practiced witchcraft. Gebbia describes herself as a "sole practitioner" because she does not belong to a coven.

== Career ==
In 1990, Gebbia moved to Los Angeles to pursue a career as an actress. Gebbia began her acting career in 1994 under the pseudonym Carlton Lynx when she first portrayed the role of Raven in Eyes of the Serpent, and Joan in 1998's The Sexperiment. She would go on to have bit roles in the sitcom Suddenly Susan, soap opera The Young and the Restless, and the supporting role of Felice Templeton in the 2000 Fox Family Channel television film Time Share starring Nastassja Kinski and Timothy Dolton. Gebbia's final film role was in 2001's Pretty When You Cry where she had the lead role of Sarah Carreni; which was produced by her husband's production company. She retired from acting after she got pregnant with her first child, telling Entertainment Weekly, "I was honing the craft, but I don't think I was completely committed to it. I did try to go back to it after I had children but I had already made that transition without even knowing."

In 2004, Gebbia and her husband purchased a 1.7 acre lot in the Beverly Ridge Estates section of Los Angeles. In 2009, she designed the property and her brother-in-law, Richard, built it. The 15,200-square-foot mansion includes a cross pool with a Baja shelf, multiple indoor Juliet balconies, wrought-iron railings, a 200-year-old fireplace, gothic mosaics, an entertainment area featuring a custom wood-carved bar and gilded ceilings, and a "playroom," which was inspired by Fifty Shades of Grey. The home was featured on Million Dollar Listing and was sold by agent Josh Altman for $13.9M in 2020.

On 18 September 2013, Gebbia was announced as one of the two newest cast members being introduced for the fourth season of the Bravo reality series The Real Housewives of Beverly Hills. beside fellow actress Joyce Giraud. During her time on the show, she feuded with cast member and actress Kyle Richards. After Richards mistook a pentagram tattoo on the back of Gebbia's neck for the Star of David, Gebbia became angry at Richards's confusion, which prompted Richards to label Gebbia as "anti-semitic." Richards also accused Gebbia of casting a spell on her after her home computer displayed the words "bigot", "travesty", "wraith," and "larva" while feeding her daughter Portia a snack. Neither Gebbia nor Giraud were invited back for the following season. In February 2014, she was featured in Lady Gaga's music video for her single G.U.Y. along with fellow housewives Lisa Vanderpump, Kim Richards, Kyle Richards, and Yolanda Foster.

== Personal life ==
Carlton married entrepreneur David Gebbia on September 19, 1997. Together they have three children: Destiny (b. 2002), Mysteri (b. 2003), and Cross (b. 2011). In August 2016, the couple announced their separation after 18 years of marriage. On 28 November 2017, David Gebbia filed for divorce citing irreconcilable differences. In May 2018, their Beverly Ridge Estates mansion was put on the market for $22 Million. The divorce was finalized on 20 September 2018.

== Legal issues ==
In late 2017, Gebbia was sued by a former housekeeper who had worked for her and her family for several years. The suit alleged physical, emotional, and verbal abuse, including an incident in which the employee claimed Gebbia pushed her after a dispute, leaving bruises. The suit also claimed that Gebbia was frequently under the influence of alcohol during her interactions with staff and that Gebbia had attempted suicide after the altercation with the employee. Gebbia denied the allegations and alleged that the housekeeper was suing over a jewelry dispute.

== Filmography ==
Year	Title	Role	Notes
1994	Eyes of the Serpent	Raven	Credited as Carlton Lynx
1998	The Sexperiment	Joan	Credited as Carlton Lynx
1999	Suddenly Susan	Jeanine	Episode: "One Man's Intervention Is Another Man's Tupperware Party"
1999	The Young and the Restless	Janina	Soap opera; 30 December 1999
2000	The Napoleon Murder Mystery	Albine de Montholon	Television documentary
2000	Time Share	Felice Templeton	Television film
2001	Pretty When You Cry	Sarah Carreni	Lead role; alternative title: Seduced
2013–14	The Real Housewives of Beverly Hills	Herself	Main cast (Season 4)
2014	Vanderpump Rules	Herself	Episode: "Tooth or Consequences"
