= Rock and Rye (song) =

Single by Tex Ritter
- Released: 1948
- Genre: Country
- Length: 2:44
- Label: Capitol
- Songwriter(s): Tex Ritter, Frank Harford, Edith Bergdahl

"Rock and Rye" is a country music song written by Tex Ritter, Frank Harford, and Edith Bergdahl, sung by Ritter, and released on the Capitol label (catalog no. 15119). In July 1948, it reached No. 5 on the Billboard folk best seller chart. It was also ranked as the No. 19 record on Billboard's 1948 year-end folk record sellers chart.
