= Seaman's Blues =

Single by Ernest Tubb
- Released: 1948
- Genre: Country
- Label: Decca
- Songwriter: Billy Tubb

"Seaman's Blues" is a country music song written by Billy Tubb, performed by Ernest Tubb, and released on the Decca label (catalog no. 46119). In May 1948, it reached No. 5 on the Billboard folk best seller chart. At the end of 1948, it was ranked No. 16 on Billboard Top Folk Records of 1948.

The song's lyrics describe the loneliness of a sailor on the ocean, longing to return to Texas and his gal.

The song was later covered by other artists, including Hank Williams, Willie Nelson, and Merle Haggard (duet with Ernest Tubb).

Tubb's recording of the song has also been recorded on multiple compilation albums, including "Ernest Tubb Favorites" (1956), "Ernest Tubb's Greatest Hits Vol. II" (1970), "The Daddy of 'Em All - Ernest Tubb 1940-1952" (1974), "The Legend and the Legacy" (1979), "Country Music Hall of Fame" (1991), and "The Texas Troubadour" (2003).
