= Tennessee Moon (song) =

1947 song by Cowboy Copas

Single by Cowboy Copas
- Released: 1947
- Genre: Country
- Length: 2:36
- Label: King
- Songwriter(s): Gene Branch

"Tennessee Moon" is a country music song written by Gene Branch, sung by Cowboy Copas, and released in 1947 on the King label (catalog no. 714). In July 1948, it reached No. 7 on the Billboard folk best seller and juke box charts. It was also ranked as the No. 27 record on the Billboard 1948 year-end folk record sellers chart.
