= Barry Young (musician) =

- Also known as: Barry Young
- Born: Clarence LaVonne Fitzgerald; June 27, 1931; Oklahoma, U.S.
- Died: December 2, 1966 (aged 35) Los Angeles, California, U.S.
- Years active: 1958–1966
- Label: Dot Records

Barry Young (né Clarence LaVonne Fitzgerald; June 27, 1931 – December 2, 1966) was an American pop singer who recorded for Dot Records in the 1960s. His biggest hit single was a recording of the tune "One Has My Name (The Other Has My Heart)," which had previously been a number 1 hit on the country charts for Jimmy Wakely in 1948. The song hit number 13 on the Billboard Hot 100 early in 1966, and number 24 in Canada. He also released an album on Dot, entitled One Has My Name, which peaked at number 67 on the Billboard 200 that same year, His single He'll Have to Go reached number 68 in Canada.

Young died of a brain abscess on December 2, 1966. He was 35 years old.
