= Humpty Dumpty Heart =

Single by Hank Thompson
- B-side: "Today"
- Released: 1948
- Recorded: 1948
- Genre: Country
- Length: 2:05
- Label: Capitol
- Songwriter(s): Hank Thompson

Hank Thompson singles chronology
"Humpty Dumpty Heart" (1948)	"Yesterday's Mail" (1948)

"Humpty Dumpty Heart", also known as "(I've Got A) Humpty Dumpty Heart", is a country music song written and sung by Hank Thompson (with backing from His Brazos Valley Boys) and released on the Capitol label. In January 1948, it reached No. 3 on the Billboard folk juke box charts. It was also ranked as the No. 6 record on Billboard's 1948 year-end folk record sellers chart. Thompson's recording was "estimated to have sold a million".

There are at least two other popular songs titled "Humpty Dumpty Heart"

- "Humpty Dumpty Heart" written by Johnny Burke and Jimmy Van Heusen song was recorded by Bing Crosby, the Glenn Miller Orchestra, and Kay Kyser, among others.
- "Humpty Dumpty Heart" written by Henry Boye was recorded by LaVern Baker.
