= One Has My Name (The Other Has My Heart) =

Song

"One Has My Name (The Other Has My Heart)" is a 1948 song by singing cowboy Eddie Dean, his wife Lorene "Dearest" Dean, and Hollywood songwriter Hal Blair. The song was first recorded by Jimmy Wakely and was his third release on the Folk Best Seller charts and his first number one. Within two years of the song's release, two additional versions of "One Has My Name (The Other Has My Heart)" made the country charts, recorded by Eddie Dean and by Bob Eberly.

== Other cover versions ==
- Nat King Cole released his version on the 1962 record Ramblin' Rose.
- In 1965, Barry Young recorded his version which reached number 13 on the Billboard Hot 100.
- Also in 1965, Gene Pitney and George Jones recorded a version during their collaboration.
- Al Martino recorded a version for his 1966 album, Spanish Eyes.
- In 1969, Jerry Lee Lewis recorded the song which reached number three on the country chart.
