= Sweeter than the Flowers =

1948 song by Moon Mullican

Single by Moon Mullican
- Released: 1948
- Genre: Country
- Label: King
- Songwriters: Ervin T. Rouse, Morry Burns, Syd Nathan

"Sweeter than the Flowers" is a country music song co-written by Ervin T. Rouse, Morry Burns, and Syd Nathan. It was sung by Moon Mullican and released on the King label. In May 1948, it reached No. 3 on the Billboard folk best seller and juke box charts. It was also ranked as the No. 9 record on Billboard's 1948 year-end folk record sellers chart.

Another version by Shorty Long and the Santa Fe Rangers reached No. 12 on the Billboard folk best seller chart in October 1948.

The song was also covered by George Jones, Johnny Cash, Waylon Jennings, Kitty Wells, Gene Pitney, The Stanley Brothers, Roy Acuff, George Morgan, Bobby Bare, Slim Whitman, Charles Louvin, Mac Wiseman, June Carter, Vernon Oxford, and others.
