= Suspicion (Les Paul song) =

- 1948 release by Fos(ter) Carling with Les Paul as Rhubarb Red

Single by Fos Carling
- A-side: "My Extraordinary Gal"
- Written: 1947
- Published: 1948
- Released: May 1948
- Recorded: December 29, 1947
- Genre: Traditional pop
- Length: 2:40
- Label: Mercury
- Songwriters: Les Paul, Foster Carling

"Suspicion" is a 1948 song co-written by Les Paul and recorded by Les Paul with Fos Carling. The song was released as a single.

== Background ==
"Suspicion" was written by Les Paul and Foster Carling in 1947. The song was released as a 78 single on Mercury Records, 5133, Matrix #1747, under the name Fos Carling accompanied by Rhubarb Red, a pseudonym for Les Paul, as part of the Mercury Popular Series in 1948. The vocals were by Fos Carling and Les Paul. The flip side of the single featured "My Extraordinary Gal" by The Les Paul Trio with Clancy Hayes on vocals. The song was published by Deerhaven Music. Les Paul had also co-written the song "You Can't Be Fit as a Fiddle (When You're Tight as a Drum)" with Foster Carling for Red Ingle.

== Other recordings ==
1948 Capitol Americana single by Tex Williams.

The song was also recorded in a hit version by Tex Williams and his Western Caravan on Capitol Americana as 40109, Matrix #2897Y, in 1948. The Tex Williams single reached no. 4 on the Billboard country music chart in 1948.

Ray Noble and his Orchestra also released the song as a 78 single on Columbia Records as 38146. The vocals were by Ray Noble and The Noblemen. The Ray Noble recording was also released as a 78 single in the UK as FB 3475 on the Columbia label.

Jo Stafford also recorded the song in 1947 with Paul Weston's Mountain Boys and released it as a Capitol 78 single, 15068. The single reached no. 23 on the Billboard pop singles chart in May, 1948 in a one-week run.

== Album appearances ==
The song appeared on the 1996 Capitol Nashville album Tex Williams: Vintage Collections Series, the 2001 album on the Capitol Collectors' Choice Music label Jo Stafford: Jo Stafford on Capitol, and the 2007 compilation Jo Stafford: Ultimate Capitol Collection on EMI.
